= 2010 Wisconsin Senate election =

2010 Wisconsin State Senate election
- November 2, 2010

17 of 33 seats in the Wisconsin State Senate 17 seats needed for a majority
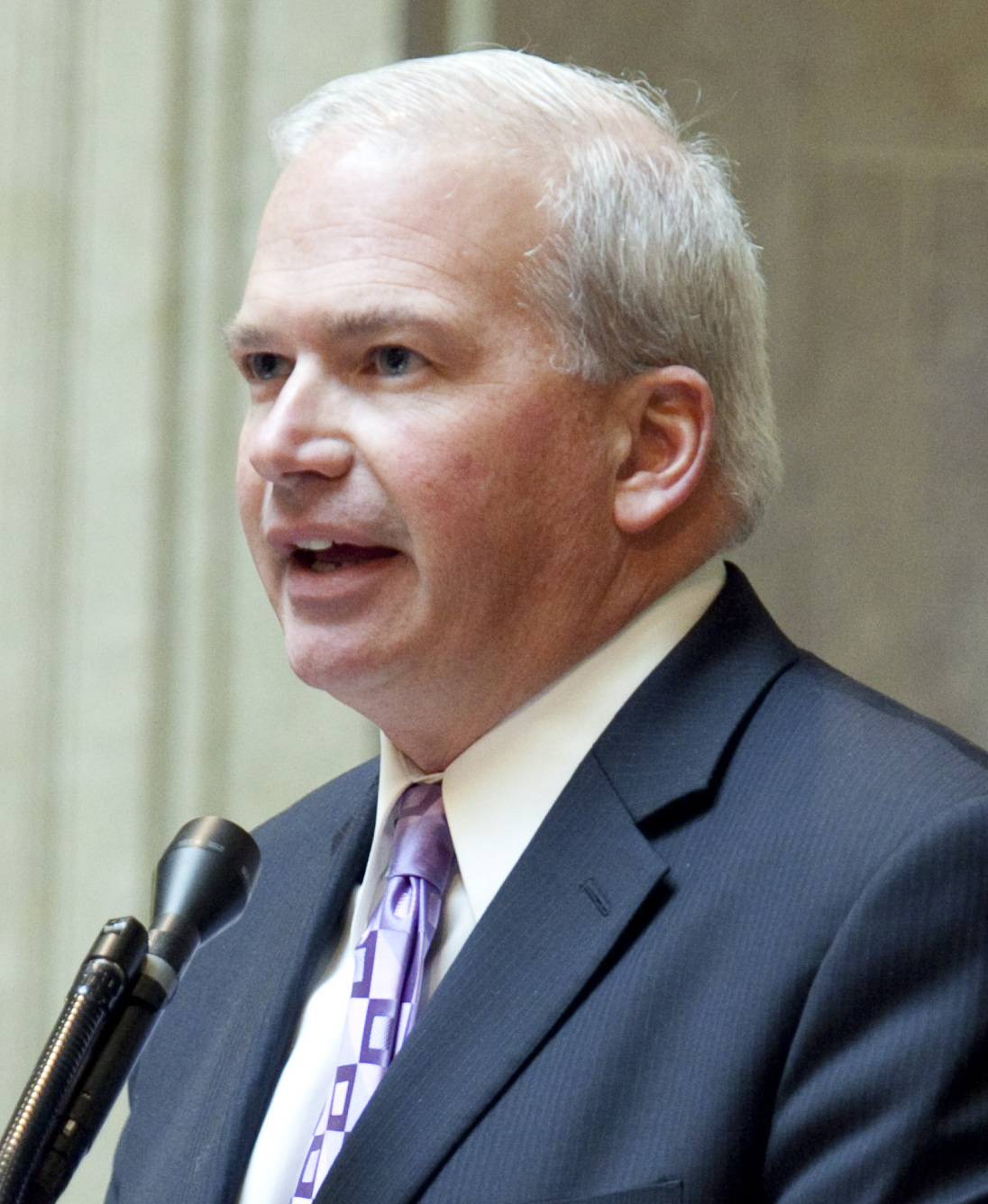

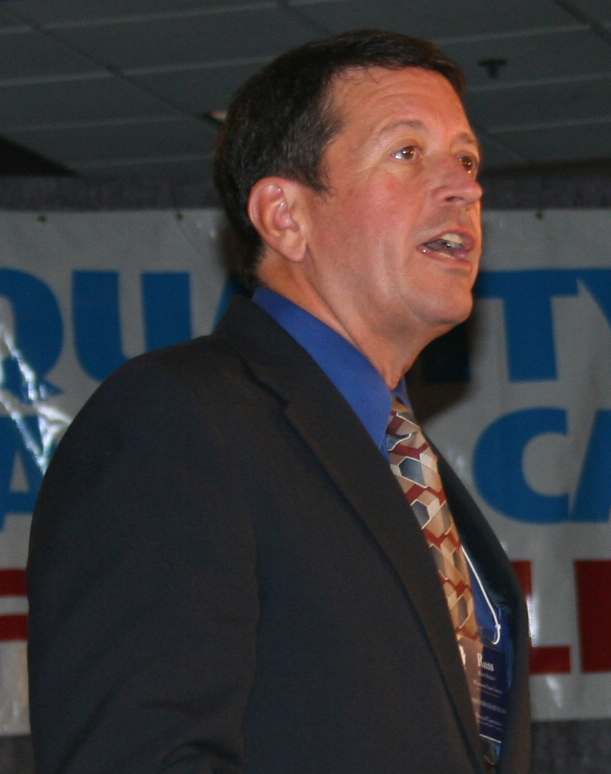
	Majority party	Minority party
Leader	Scott L. Fitzgerald	Russ Decker (defeated)
Party	Republican	Democratic
Leader since	January 1, 2007	October 24, 2007
Leader's seat	13th–Juneau	29th–Weston
Last election	8 seats, 45.53%	8 seats, 54.09%
Seats before	15	18
Seats won	10	6
Seats after	19	14
Seat change	▲4	▼4
Popular vote	627,160	430,068
Percentage	59.1%	40.53%
Swing	▲13.6 pp	▼13.5 pp
- Republican hold Republican gain Democratic hold No election 50–60% 60–70% 70–80% >90% 50–60% 60–70% No election
President before election
Fred Risser
Democratic
Elected President
Michael Ellis
Republican

The 2010 Wisconsin Senate elections were held on Tuesday, November 2, 2010. Seventeen of the 33 seats in the Wisconsin State Senate were up for election—the odd-numbered districts. Before the election, 18 Senate seats were held by Democrats and 15 seats were held by Republicans. 10 Democratic seats and 7 Republican seats were up in this election. The primary election took place on September 14, 2010.

Republicans flipped four Democratic-held Senate seats and achieved a majority for the first time since 2004, entering the 100th Wisconsin Legislature with 19 of 33 State Senate seats.

== Summary ==
Seats		Party (majority caucus shading)		Total
Seats		Democratic	Republican	Total
Last election (2008)		8	8	16
Total after last election (2008)		18	15	33
Total before this election		18	15	33
Up for election		10	7	17
of which:	Incumbent retiring	2	2	4
of which:	Vacated			
of which:	Unopposed		2	2
This election		6	11	17
Change from last election				
Total after this election		14	19	33
Change in total		▼4	▲4	

=== Close races ===
Seats where the margin of victory was under 10%:

1. State Senate district 31, 0.66%
2. State Senate district 25, 2.58%
3. State Senate district 5, 4.46% (gain)
4. State Senate district 29, 4.64% (gain)
5. State Senate district 21, 5.09% (gain)
6. State Senate district 23, 8.47% (gain)

== Outgoing incumbents ==
=== Retired ===
- Alan Lasee, (R–De Pere), representing District 1 since 1977, announced he would not seek re-election.
- Judy Robson (D–Beloit), representing District 15 since 1999, announced she would not seek re-election.
- Theodore Kanavas (R–Brookfield), representing District 33 since 2001, announced he would not seek re-election.

=== Lost renomination ===
- Jeffrey Plale (D–South Milwaukee), representing district 7 since 2003, lost renomination to Chris Larson (D–Milwaukee)

== Predictions ==
Source	Ranking	As of
Governing	Lean R (flip)	November 1, 2010

== Candidates and results ==
Dist.	Incumbent				This race	
Dist.	Member	Party	First elected	Status	General	Result
01	Alan Lasee	Republican	1977 (special)	Not running	✓ Frank Lasee (Rep.) 60.04%; Monk Elmer (Dem.) 39.83%	New member elected. Republican hold.
03	Tim Carpenter	Democratic	2002	Running	✓ Tim Carpenter (Dem.) 61.09%; Annette Miller Krznarich (Rep.) 38.63%	Incumbent re-elected
05	Jim Sullivan	Democratic	2006	Running	✓ Leah Vukmir (Rep.) 52.15%; Jim Sullivan (Dem.) 47.69%	New member elected. Republican gain.
07	Jeffrey Plale	Democratic	2003 (special)	Running	✓ Chris Larson (Dem.) 67.25%; Peter Gilbert (Rep.) 32.64%	New member elected. Democratic hold.
09	Joe Leibham	Republican	2002	Running	✓ Joe Leibham (Rep.) 73.11%; Jason B. Borden (Dem.) 26.86%	Incumbent re-elected
11	Neal Kedzie	Republican	2002	Running	✓ Neal Kedzie (Rep.) 75.37%; L.D. Rockwell (Dem.) 24.55%	Incumbent re-elected
13	Scott L. Fitzgerald	Republican	1994	Running	✓ Scott L. Fitzgerald (Rep.) 67.61%; Dwayne Block (Dem.) 29.20%; Vittorio Spadaro (Ind.) 3.14%	Incumbent re-elected
15	Judy Robson	Democratic	1998	Not running	✓ Timothy Cullen (Dem.) 58.98%; Rick Richard (Rep.) 40.99%	New member elected. Democratic hold.
17	Dale Schultz	Republican	1990	Running	✓ Dale Schultz (Rep.) 62.56%; Carol Beals (Dem.) 37.38%	Incumbent re-elected
19	Michael Ellis	Republican	1982	Running	✓ Michael Ellis (Rep.) 99.04%	Incumbent re-elected
21	John Lehman	Democratic	2006	Running	✓ Van H. Wanggaard (Rep.) 52.52%; John Lehman (Dem.) 47.43%	New member elected. Republican gain.
23	Pat Kreitlow	Democratic	2006	Running	✓ Terry Moulton (Rep.) 54.20%; Pat Kreitlow (Dem.) 45.73%	New member elected. Republican gain.
25	Bob Jauch	Democratic	1986	Running	✓ Robert Jauch (Dem.) 51.27%; Dane Deutsch (Rep.) 48.69%	Incumbent re-elected
27	Jon Erpenbach	Democratic	1998	Running	✓ Jon Erpenbach (Dem.) 61.84%; Kurt Schlicht (Rep.) 38.13%	Incumbent re-elected
29	Russ Decker	Democratic	1990	Running	✓ Pam Galloway (Rep.) 52.26%; Russ Decker (Dem.) 47.62%	New member elected. Republican gain.
31	Kathleen Vinehout	Democratic	2006	Running	✓ Kathleen Vinehout (Dem.) 50.27%; Ed Thompson (Rep.) 49.61%	Incumbent re-elected
33	Theodore Kanavas	Republican	2001 (special)	Not running	✓ Rich Zipperer (Rep.) 99.50%	New member elected. Republican hold.

== Detailed results ==
=== District 1 ===
County results: Lasee—60–70% Hutchison—40–50% Hutchison—50–60%

Incumbent Republican Alan Lasee declined to seek re-election.

District 9 Republican primary
Party	Candidate	Votes	%
Republican	Frank Lasee	12,523	56.77
Republican	David E. Hutchison	7,726	35.02
Republican	Jon Soyring	1,800	8.16
Write-in		11	0.05
Total votes		22,060	100.0

District 1 general election
Party	Candidate	Votes	%
Republican	Frank Lasee	43,415	60.04
Democratic	Monk Elmer	28,800	39.83
Write-in		98	0.14
Total votes		72,313	100.0

=== District 3 ===
Incumbent Democrat Tim Carpenter ran for re-election.

=== District 5 ===
Incumbent Democrat Jim Sullivan ran for re-election. He faced Republican state representative Leah Vukmir in what was described as the most vulnerable seat for Democrats that cycle. Going into the election, the 5th district was rated as a tossup, with Vukmir outraising Sullivan in the first six months of the campaign and outside campaign spending flooding into the district. Due to outside spending, the 5th district proved to be the most expensive race in the chamber. During the campaign, Sullivan made attempts to distance himself from incumbent governor Jim Doyle, who saw his poll numbers collapsing going into the election year. While Democratic strategists viewed any competitive margin from Sullivan as a sign of a well fought campaign, arguing that Vukmir was too extreme for the moderately conservative suburban district. Vukmir defeated Sullivan by a five-point margin.

District 5 general election
Party	Candidate	Votes	%
Republican	Leah Vukmir	36,852	52.15
Democratic	Jim Sullivan (incumbent)	33,702	47.69
Write-in		109	0.15
Total votes		70,663	100.0

=== District 7 ===
Incumbent Democrat Jeffrey Plale ran for re-election. He faced Democratic county supervisor Chris Larson in the primary election. In previous cycles, Plale had faced challengers from the left in 2003 and 2006, both of whom he had defeated soundly. Going into the 2010 cycle, however, Plale faced a stronger challenger in Milwaukee County board member Chris Larson. During the campaign, Plale faced criticism for his stances as a conservative Democrat, as well as blocking a key environmental bill he had previously supported. Due to his part in killing the climate bill, Plale lost the support of governor Jim Doyle, who had supported the legislation. Despite this loss of support, Plale still had the support of majority leader Russ Decker, himself locked in a close re-election, and endorsements from state representatives Christine Sinicki and Jon Richards as well as WEAC. The campaign also took on a regional tone, as Plale's base was in Cudahy, St. Francis, and South Milwaukee, while Larson's base centered around the south and east sides of Milwaukee. Seeking to defeat Plale, progressives had hoped the competitive Republican gubernatorial primary would sap away conservative Democrats who would have otherwise voted for Plale. Larson defeated Plale in an upset, winning by a 21-point margin. Larson went on to defeat Republican Jess Ripp by a 15-point margin.

District 7 Democratic primary
Party	Candidate	Votes	%
Democratic	Chris Larson	7,962	60.61
Democratic	Jeffrey Plale (incumbent)	5,148	39.19
Write-in		27	0.21
Total votes		13,137	100.0

District 7 general election
Party	Candidate	Votes	%
Democratic	Chris Larson	37,165	57.11
Republican	Jess Ripp	27,772	42.68
Write-in		140	0.22
Total votes		65,077	100.0

=== District 9 ===
Incumbent Republican Joe Leibham ran for re-election.

=== District 11 ===
Incumbent Republican Neal Kedzie ran for re-election.

=== District 13 ===
Incumbent Republican Scott Fitzgerald ran for re-election.

=== District 15 ===
Incumbent Democrat Judy Robson declined to seek re-election.

=== District 17 ===
Incumbent Republican Dale Schultz ran for re-election

=== District 19 ===
Incumbent Republican Michael Ellis ran for re-election unopposed.

District 19 general election
Party	Candidate	Votes	%
Republican	Michael Ellis (incumbent)	49,179	99.04
Write-in		476	0.96
Total votes		49,655	100.0

=== District 21 ===
Incumbent Democrat John Lehman ran for re-election. Two Republicans announced campaigns to face the Racine Democrat, being county board member Van H. Wanggaard and Bob Gulan, in what was projected to be a tight race for Lehman. Lehman had been initially elected in 2006 amid a national backlash to the administration of George W. Bush. Lehman was predicted to face a tough re-election, due to the faltering economy in Racine, as well as an unenergized base and energized opposition. Due to these circumstances, the district was seen as a tossup, with some political commentators viewing the seat as most likely to flip into the Republican column. Wanggaard defeated Lehman by a five-point margin.

District 21 Republican primary
Party	Candidate	Votes	%
Republican	Van H. Wanggaard	13,864	79.89
Republican	Bob Gulan	3,475	20.03
Write-in		14	0.08
Total votes		17,353	100.0

District 21 general election
Party	Candidate	Votes	%
Republican	Van H. Wanggaard	32,036	52.52
Democratic	John Lehman (incumbent)	28,930	47.43
Write-in		29	0.05
Total votes		60,995	100.0

=== District 23 ===
Incumbent Democrat Pat Kreitlow ran for re-election. He was defeated by former Republican state representative Terry Moulton by an eight-point margin.

=== District 25 ===
Incumbent Democrat Robert Jauch ran for re-election. He defeated Republican business owner Dane Deutsch by a three-point margin. During the campaign, Deutsch sparked controversy due to social media posts he made where he compared Adolf Hitler and Abraham Lincoln, calling both strong leaders.

=== District 27 ===
Incumbent Democrat Jon Erpenbach ran for re-election. Three Republicans filed for the nomination, Kurt Schlicht, home-builder Tom Lamberson, and Tony Wickersham. Schlicht won the primary by a wide margin and faced Erpenbach in the general election. He was defeated by a wide margin.

=== District 29 ===
County results: Galloway—50–60% Galloway—60–70% Galloway—70–80% Galloway—80–90% Edming—50–60% Edming—70–80%

Incumbent Democrat Russ Decker ran for re-election. In what was initially viewed as a longshot bid, two Republicans business owner Pam Galloway and 2006 nominee Jimmy Boy Edming ran for the nomination. Galloway won the nomination by a wide margin and went on to face Decker. Initially deemed a safe seat for Decker, he was eventually locked in a tight race with Galloway, which attracted high amounts of outside spending. Decker was defeated by Galloway by a five-point margin.

District 29 Republican primary
Party	Candidate	Votes	%
Republican	Pam Galloway	10,351	70.45
Republican	Jimmy Boy Edming	4,332	29.49
Write-in		9	0.06
Total votes		14,692	100.0

County results: Galloway—50–60% Decker—50–60%

District 29 general election
Party	Candidate	Votes	%
Republican	Pam Galloway	32,640	52.26
Democratic	Russ Decker (incumbent)	29,742	47.62
Write-in		70	0.11
Total votes		60,298	100.0

=== District 31 ===
Incumbent Democrat Kathleen Vinehout ran for re-election. She faced former Tomah mayor and 2002 Libertarian nominee for governor Ed Thompson. In September, Thompson was diagnosed with cancer, which hindered his ability to campaign. Throughout the campaign, some Republican strategists feared that Thompson's Libertarian views could frustrate the Republican goal of a senate majority, and that if he were elected, he could serve as a de facto majority leader in the state senate. The district was, however, seen as a long-shot for Republicans, and was rated by WisPolitics as "lean Democratic", with his eccentric political beliefs and familial ties to former governor Tommy Thompson providing a mixed image of his electability in the district.

District 31 general election
Party	Candidate	Votes	%
Democratic	Kathleen Vinehout (incumbent)	30,314	50.27
Republican	Ed Thompson	29,911	49.61
Write-in		73	0.12
Total votes		60,298	100.0

=== District 33 ===
Incumbent Republican Theodore Kanavas declined to seek re-election. Republican Rich Zipperer defeated candidate Tim Dietrich by a wide margin in the primary. In the general election, Zipperer was elected unopposed.

== See also ==
- Electoral history of the Tea Party movement
- 2010 Wisconsin elections
  - 2010 Wisconsin gubernatorial election
  - 2010 Wisconsin State Assembly election
  - 2010 United States Senate election in Wisconsin
  - 2010 United States House of Representatives elections in Wisconsin
