= 2002 Wisconsin Senate election =

2002 Wisconsin State Senate election
- November 5, 2002

17 of 33 seats in the Wisconsin Senate 17 seats needed for a majority

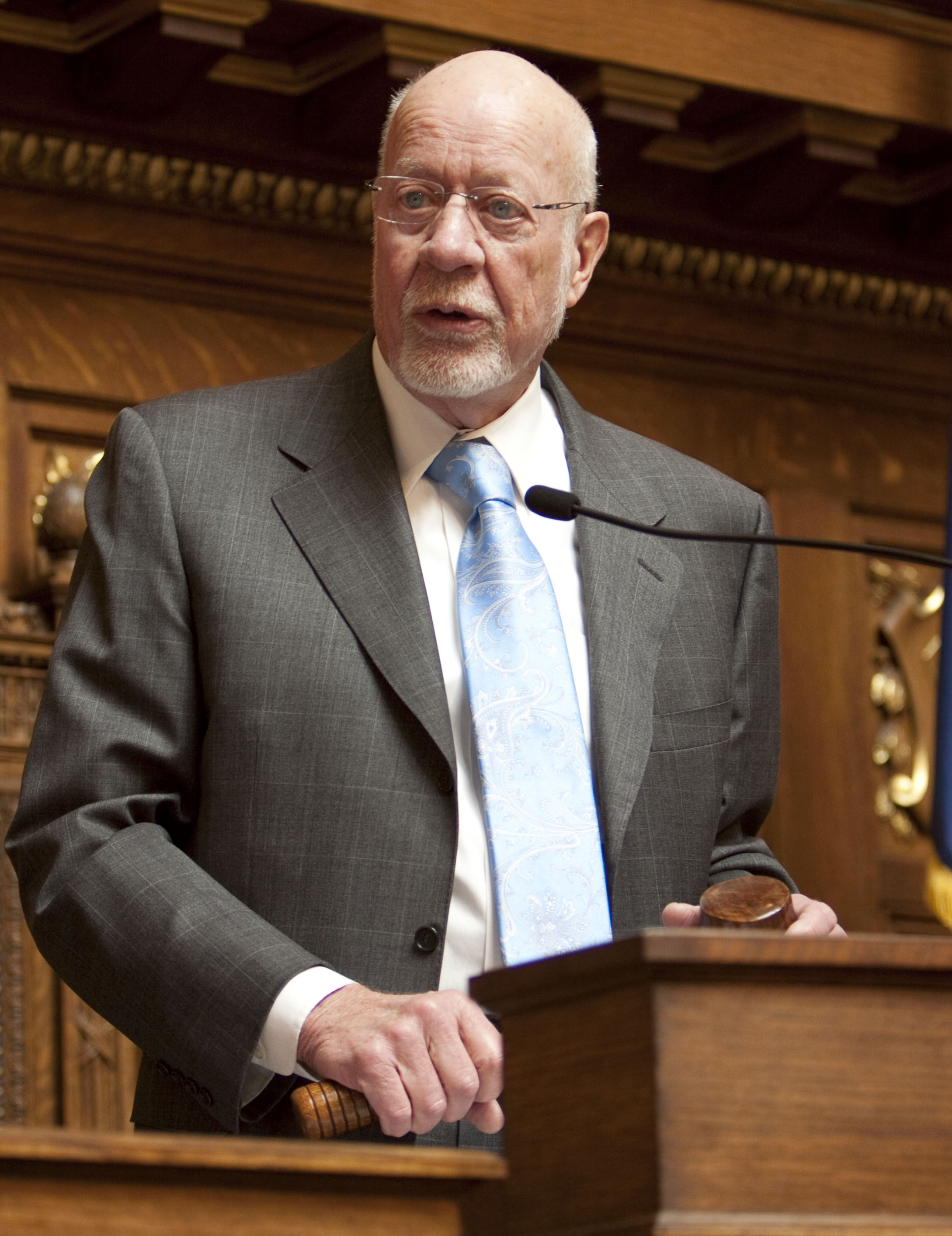

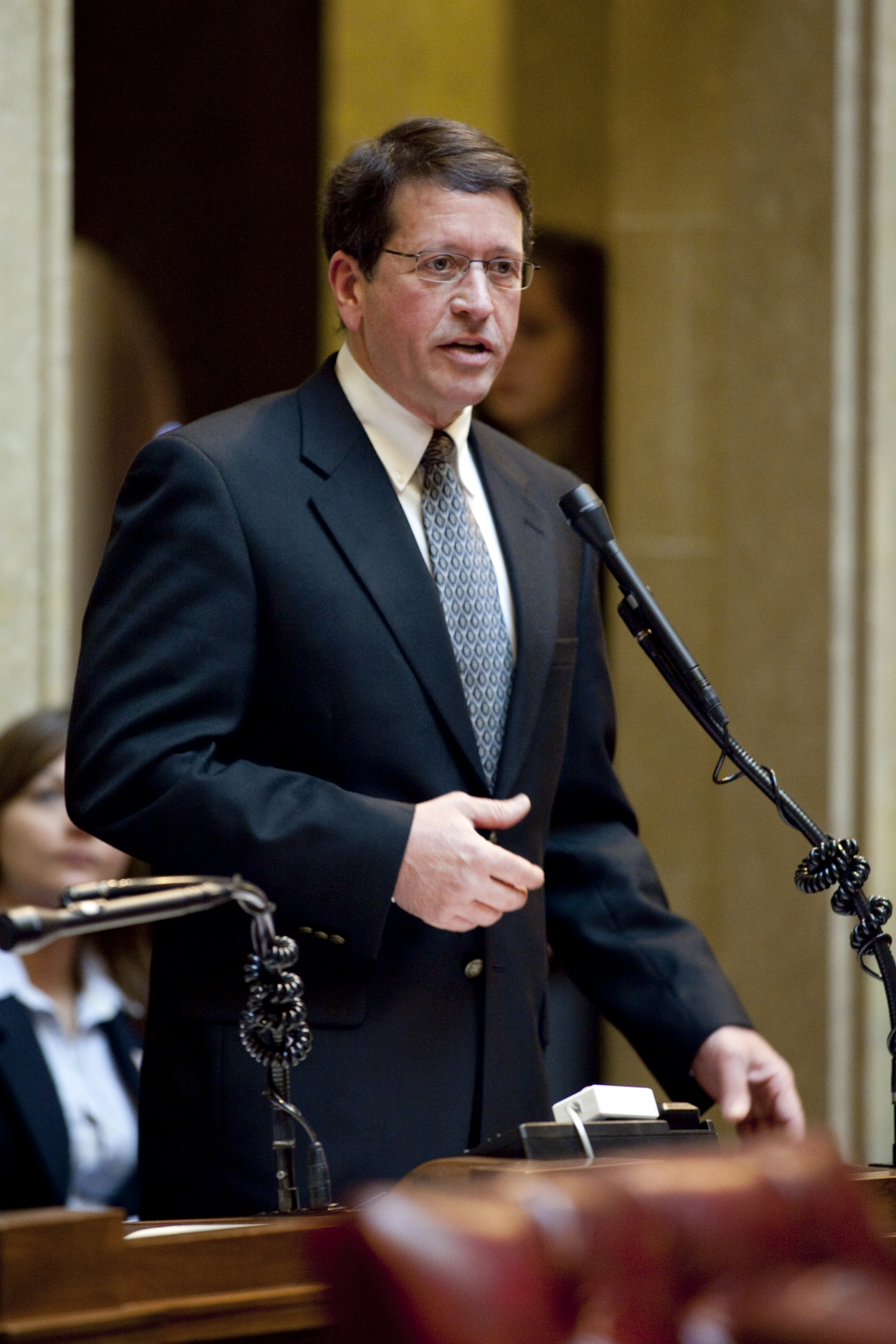
	Majority party	Minority party
Leader	Mary Panzer	Russ Decker & Fred Risser
Party	Republican	Democratic
Leader since	January 25, 2000	October 21, 2002 & October 21, 2002
Leader's seat	20th–West Bend	26th–Madison; 29th–Weston
Last election	7 seats, 45.81%	9 seats, 53.12%
Seats before	15	18
Seats won	11	6
Seats after	18	15
Seat change	▲3	▼3
Popular vote	427,850	372,808
Percentage	52.71%	45.93%
Swing	▲6.90%	▼7.19%
- Republican hold Republican gain Democratic hold No election 50–60% 60–70% >90% 60–70% 70–80% >90% No election
President before election
Fred Risser
Democratic
Elected President
Alan Lasee
Republican

The 2002 Wisconsin Senate election was held on Tuesday November 5, 2002, at the Fall general election in Wisconsin, alongside the election to the State Assembly and other statewide and local offices. The Seventeen odd-numbered seats in Wisconsin Senate were up for election. Prior to the election 18 seats were held by Democrats and 15 were held by Republicans. The primary election was held on September 10, 2002.

This was the first Wisconsin Senate election following the 2002 redistricting process, which saw federal courts draw the maps in the case Baumgart v. Wendelberger (2002). Republicans won four competitive senate races, flipping three seats held by Democratic incumbents. This election saw Democrats lose control of the Wisconsin Senate after having held control of the chamber since the 1998 election.

After this election, Republicans entered the 96th Wisconsin Legislature with 18 of 33 seats.

== Summary ==
Seats		Party (majority caucus shading)		Total
Seats		Republican	Democratic	Total
Last election (2000)		7	9	16
Total after last election (2000)		15	18	33
Total before this election		15	18	33
Up for election		8	9	17
of which:	Incumbent retiring	1	1	2
of which:	Vacated	0	0	0
of which:	Unopposed	2	2	4
This election		11	6	17
Change from last election		▲3	▼3	Steady
Total after this election		18	15	33
Change in total		▲3	▼3	Steady

Party	Candidates	Votes	
Party	Candidates	No.	%
Republican	14	427,850	52.71%
Democratic	15	372,808	45.93%
Green	1	8,790	1.08%
Write-in	–	2,245	0.27%
Total		1,521,649	100.0%

Popular vote
Republican	52.71%
Democratic	45.93%
Green	1.08%
Scattering	0.27%

Senate seats (up)
Republican	64.71%
Democratic	35.29%

Senate seats (total)
Republican	54.55%
Democratic	45.45%

=== Close races ===
Seats where the margin of victory was under 10%:

- State Senate district 9, 0.08% (gain)
- State Senate district 31, 0.99% (gain)
- State Senate district 21, 1.54% (gain)
- State Senate district 5, 6.12%

== Outgoing incumbents ==
=== Retiring ===
- Brian Burke (D–Milwaukee), representing district 3 since 1989, retired.
- Joanne Huelsman (R–Waukesha), representing district 11 since 1991, retired.

=== Lost renomination ===
- Peggy Rosenzweig (R–Wauwatosa), representing district 5 since 1993, lost renomination to Thomas G. Reynolds (R–Wauwatosa).

== Candidates and results ==
Dist.	Incumbent				This race
Dist.	Member	Party	First elected	Status	General
01	Alan Lasee	Republican	1977 (special)	Incumbent re-elected	▌ ✓ Alan Lasee (Rep.) 63.18%; ▌Susan Hilsabeck (Dem.) 36.77%
03	Brian Burke	Democratic	1988 (special)	Incumbent retired. New member elected. Democratic hold.	▌ ✓ Tim Carpenter (Dem.) 97.96%
05	Peggy Rosenzweig	Republican	1993 (special)	Incumbent lost re-nomination. New member elected. Republican hold.	▌ ✓ Thomas G. Reynolds (Rep.) 52.85%; ▌ George L. Christenson (Dem.) 46.73%
07	Richard Grobschmidt	Democratic	1995 (special)	Incumbent re-elected	▌ ✓ Richard Grobschmidt (Dem.) 79.13%; ▌Jim Carpenter (Grn.) 20.27%
09	James Baumgart	Democratic	1998	Incumbent lost re-election. New member elected. Republican gain.	▌ ✓ Joe Leibham (Rep.) 50.01%; ▌James Baumgart (Dem.) 49.93%
11	Joanne Huelsman	Republican	1990	Incumbent retired. New member elected. Republican hold.	▌ ✓ Neal Kedzie (Rep.) 69.10%; ▌Scott Woods (Dem.) 30.83 %
13	Scott L. Fitzgerald	Republican	1994	Incumbent re-elected	▌ ✓ Scott L. Fitzgerald (Rep.) 68.72%; ▌Walt Christensen (Dem.) 31.22 %
15	Judy Robson	Democratic	1998	Incumbent re-elected	▌ ✓ Judy Robson (Dem.) 64.66%; ▌Gregory A.Black (Rep.) 35.30%
17	Dale Schultz	Republican	1991 (special)	Incumbent re-elected	▌ ✓ Dale Schultz (Rep.) 66.92%; ▌Emmett J. Reilly (Dem.) 33.04%
19	Michael Ellis	Republican	1982	Incumbent re-elected	▌ ✓ Michael Ellis (Rep.) 99.23%
21	Kimberly Plache	Democratic	1996 (recall)	Incumbent lost re-election. New member elected. Republican gain.	▌ ✓ Cathy Stepp (Rep.) 50.68%; ▌Kimberly Plache (Dem.) 49.14%
23	David Zien	Republican	1993 (special)	Incumbent re-elected	▌ ✓ David Zien (Rep.) 63.25%; ▌Earl A. Larson (Dem.) 36.70%
25	Bob Jauch	Democratic	1986	Incumbent re-elected	▌ ✓ Robert Jauch (Dem.) 62.08%; ▌Gregg Condon (Rep.) 37.89%
27	Jon Erpenbach	Democratic	1998	Incumbent re-elected	▌ ✓ Jon Erpenbach (Dem.) 99.35%
29	Russ Decker	Democratic	1990	Incumbent re-elected	▌ ✓ Russ Decker (Dem.) 68.05%; ▌Jimmy Boy Edming (Rep.) 31.94%
31	Rodney C. Moen	Democratic	1982	Incumbent lost re-election. New member elected. Republican gain.	▌ ✓ Ron Brown (Rep.) 50.43%; ▌Rodney C. Moen (Dem.) 49.44%
33	Theodore Kanavas	Republican	2001 (special)	Incumbent re-elected	▌ ✓ Theodore Kanavas (Rep.) 99.52%

== Detailed results ==
=== District 1 ===
Incumbent Republican Alan Lasee ran for re-election. He defeated Democrat Susan Hilsabeck by a wide margin.

District 1 general election
Party	Candidate	Votes	%
Republican	Alan Lasee (incumbent)	67,979	64.46
Democratic	Susan Hilsabeck	37,430	35.49
Write-in		50	0.05
Total votes		105,459	100.0

=== District 3 ===
Incumbent Democrat Brian Burke declined to seek re-election. Democratic state representative Tim Carpenter defeated fellow Democrat Pat Farley in the primary by a 19-point margin. He was elected unopposed in the general election.

District 3 Democratic primary
Party	Candidate	Votes	%
Democratic	Tim Carpenter	8,491	52.92
Democratic	Pat Farley	5,328	33.21
Democratic	Roman R. Blenski (deceased)	2,187	13.63
Write-in		25	0.07
Total votes		33,063	100.0

District 3 general election
Party	Candidate	Votes	%
Democratic	Tim Carpenter	24,431	97.96
Write-in		508	2.04
Total votes		24,939	100.0

=== District 5 ===
Incumbent Republican Peggy Rosenzweig ran for re-election. She faced businessman and perennial candidate Thomas G. Reynolds in the primary. During the campaign, the two candidates represented different sides to the Republican Party, with Rosenzweig being considered a liberal or moderate Republican, including on issues such as abortion, while Reynolds was considered the more conservative candidate. Due to her moderate positions, grassroots elements of the Republican Party such as Citizens for Responsible Government coalesced behind Reynolds, who ran on a staunch conservative platform emphasizing his pro-life stances, as well as opposition to tax increases and reducing restrictions on firearms. Despite this, Rosenzweig gained the support of the Republican political establishment, including Milwaukee County executive Scott Walker. She was defeated in the primary election by Reynolds by a seven-point margin in an upset. Reynolds went on to defeat Democrat George L. Christenson by a six-point margin.

Following her defeat, it was speculated Rosenzweig's re-election bid had been hurt by the fact Democrats had a competitive gubernatorial primary that year, which had pulled away Democratic voters who had previously crossed over to vote for Rosenzweig in the Republican primary.

District 5 Republican primary
Party	Candidate	Votes	%
Republican	Tom Reynolds	5,673	53.73
Republican	Peggy Rosenzweig (incumbent)	4,882	46.24
Write-in		4	0.04
Total votes		10,559	100.0

District 5 general election
Party	Candidate	Votes	%
Republican	Tom Reynolds	31,693	52.85
Democratic	George L. Christenson	28,021	46.73
Write-in		256	0.43
Total votes		59,970	100.0

=== District 7 ===
Incumbent Democrat Richard Grobschmidt ran for re-election. He faced Green Party candidate Jim Carpenter, defeating him by a wide margin.

District 7 general election
Party	Candidate	Votes	%
Democratic	Richard Grobschmidt (incumbent)	34,319	79.13
Green	Jim Carpenter	8,790	20.27
Write-in		261	0.60
Total votes		43,370	100.0

=== District 9 ===
Incumbent Democrat James Baumgart ran for re-election. He was defeated by Republican state legislator Joe Leibham by a narrow 46-vote margin.

District 9 general election
Party	Candidate	Votes	%
Republican	Joe Leibham	27,858	50.01
Democratic	James Baumgart (incumbent)	27,812	49.93
Write-in		34	0.06
Total votes		43,370	100.0

=== District 11 ===
Incumbent Republican Joanne Huelsman declined to seek re-election due to redistricting. In the Republican primary, State legislator Neal Kedzie defeated Delafield mayor Jim Behrend and first-time candidate Jack Riley. Kedzie defeated Democrat Scott Woods by a wide margin in the general election.

District 11 Republican primary
Party	Candidate	Votes	%
Republican	Neal Kedzie	5,534	56.70
Republican	Jim Behrend	5,328	27.68
Republican	Jack Riley	1,518	15.55
Write-in		6	0.06
Total votes		9,760	100.0

District 11 general election
Party	Candidate	Votes	%
Republican	Neal Kedzie	36,603	69.10
Democratic	Scott Woods	16,329	30.83
Write-in		36	0.07
Total votes		52,968	100.0

=== District 13 ===
Incumbent Republican Scott Fitzgerald ran for re-election. He defeated Democrat Walt Christensen by a wide margin.

District 13 general election
Party	Candidate	Votes	%
Republican	Scott Fitzgerald (incumbent)	36,359	68.72
Democratic	Walt Christensen	16,516	31.22
Write-in		35	0.07
Total votes		52,910	100.0

=== District 15 ===
Incumbent Democrat Judy Robson ran for re-election. She defeated Democrat Gregory A. Black by a wide margin.

District 13 general election
Party	Candidate	Votes	%
Democratic	Judy Robson (incumbent)	33,491	64.66
Republican	Gregory A. Black	18,281	35.30
Write-in		20	0.04
Total votes		51,792	100.0

=== District 17 ===
County results: Schultz—60–70% Schultz—70–80%

Incumbent Republican Dale Schultz ran for re-election. He defeated Democrat Emmett J. Reilly by a wide margin.

District 17 general election
Party	Candidate	Votes	%
Republican	Dale Schultz (incumbent)	31,462	66.92
Democratic	Emmett J. Reilly	15,534	33.04
Write-in		16	0.03
Total votes		47,012	100.0

=== District 19 ===
Incumbent Republican Michael Ellis ran for re-election unopposed.

District 19 general election
Party	Candidate	Votes	%
Republican	Michael Ellis (incumbent)	40,737	99.23
Write-in		317	0.77
Total votes		41,054	100.0

=== District 21 ===
Incumbent Democrat Kimberly Plache ran for re-election. She was defeated by Republican business owner Cathy Stepp by a 773-vote margin. The Plache-Stepp race was described by some as a proxy battle between Republican leadership and the failing leadership of Chuck Chvala, with Plache having been the protege of the former majority leader.

District 21 Republican primary
Party	Candidate	Votes	%
Republican	Cathy Stepp	5,462	77.17
Republican	Jim Behrend	1,613	22.79
Write-in		3	0.04
Total votes		7,078	100.0

District 21 general election
Party	Candidate	Votes	%
Republican	Cathy Stepp	25,367	50.68
Democratic	Kimberly Plache (incumbent)	24,594	49.14
Write-in		89	0.18
Total votes		50,050	100.0

=== District 23 ===
County results: Zien—50–60% Zien—60–70% Zien—70–80%

Incumbent Republican David Zien ran for re-election. He defeated Democrat Earl A. Larson by a wide margin.

District 23 general election
Party	Candidate	Votes	%
Republican	David Zien (incumbent)	33,526	63.25
Democratic	Earl A. Larson	19,452	36.70
Write-in		30	0.06
Total votes		53,008	100.0

=== District 25 ===
County results: Jauch—50–60% Jauch—60–70% Jauch—70–80% Condon—50–60%

Incumbent Democrat Robert Jauch ran for re-election. He defeated Republican Gregg Condon by a wide margin.

District 25 general election
Party	Candidate	Votes	%
Democratic	Robert Jauch (incumbent)	33,993	62.08
Republican	Gregg Condon	20,751	37.89
Write-in		16	0.03
Total votes		54,760	100.0

=== District 27 ===
Incumbent Democrat Jon Erpenbach ran for re-election unopposed.

District 27 general election
Party	Candidate	Votes	%
Democratic	Jon Erpenbach (incumbent)	46,571	99.35
Write-in		307	0.65
Total votes		46,878	100.0

=== District 29 ===
County results: Decker—50–60% Decker—60–70% Decker—70–80% Edming—50–60%

Incumbent Democrat Russ Decker ran for re-election. He defeated Republican "Jimmy Boy" Edming by a wide margin.

District 29 general election
Party	Candidate	Votes	%
Democratic	Russ Decker (incumbent)	38,779	68.05
Republican	Jimmy Boy Edming	18,201	31.94
Write-in		9	0.02
Total votes		56,989	100.0

=== District 31 ===
County results: Brown—50–60% Moen—50–60%

Incumbent Democrat Rodney C. Moen ran for re-election. He was defeated by business owner Ron Brown.

District 31 general election
Party	Candidate	Votes	%
Republican	Ron Brown	27,402	50.43
Democratic	Rodney C. Moen (incumbent)	26,864	49.44
Write-in		68	0.13
Total votes		54,334	100.0

=== District 33 ===
Incumbent Republican Theodore Kanavas ran for re-election unopposed.

District 33 general election
Party	Candidate	Votes	%
Republican	Theodore Kanavas (incumbent)	44,527	99.52
Write-in		215	0.48
Total votes		44,742	100.0

== See also ==
- Redistricting in Wisconsin
- 2002 Wisconsin elections
  - 2002 Wisconsin State Assembly election
- 2002 United States elections
- Elections in Wisconsin
- Wisconsin Senate
