= 2006 Wisconsin Senate election =

2006 Wisconsin State Senate election
- November 7, 2006

17 of 33 seats in the Wisconsin Senate 17 seats needed for a majority
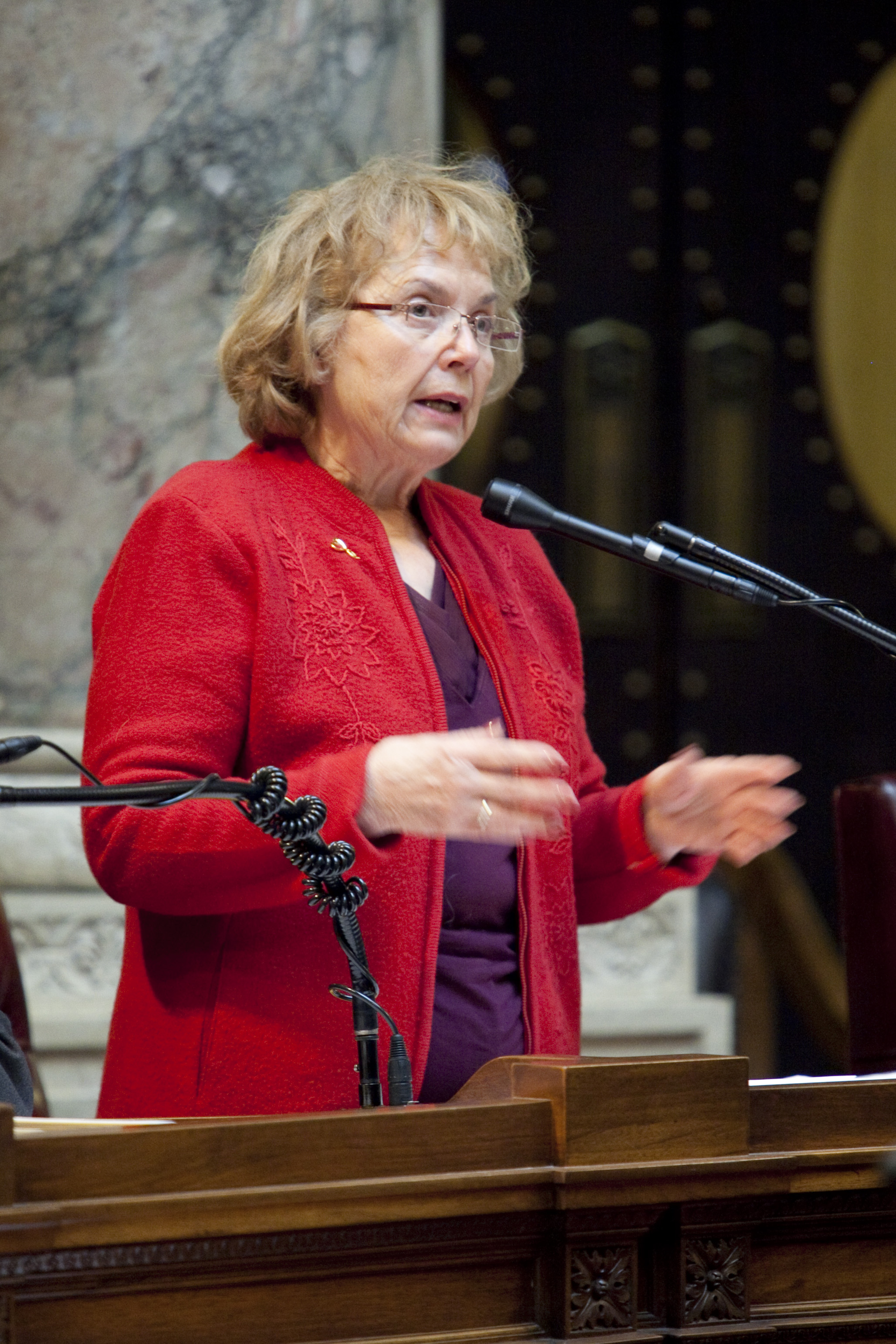

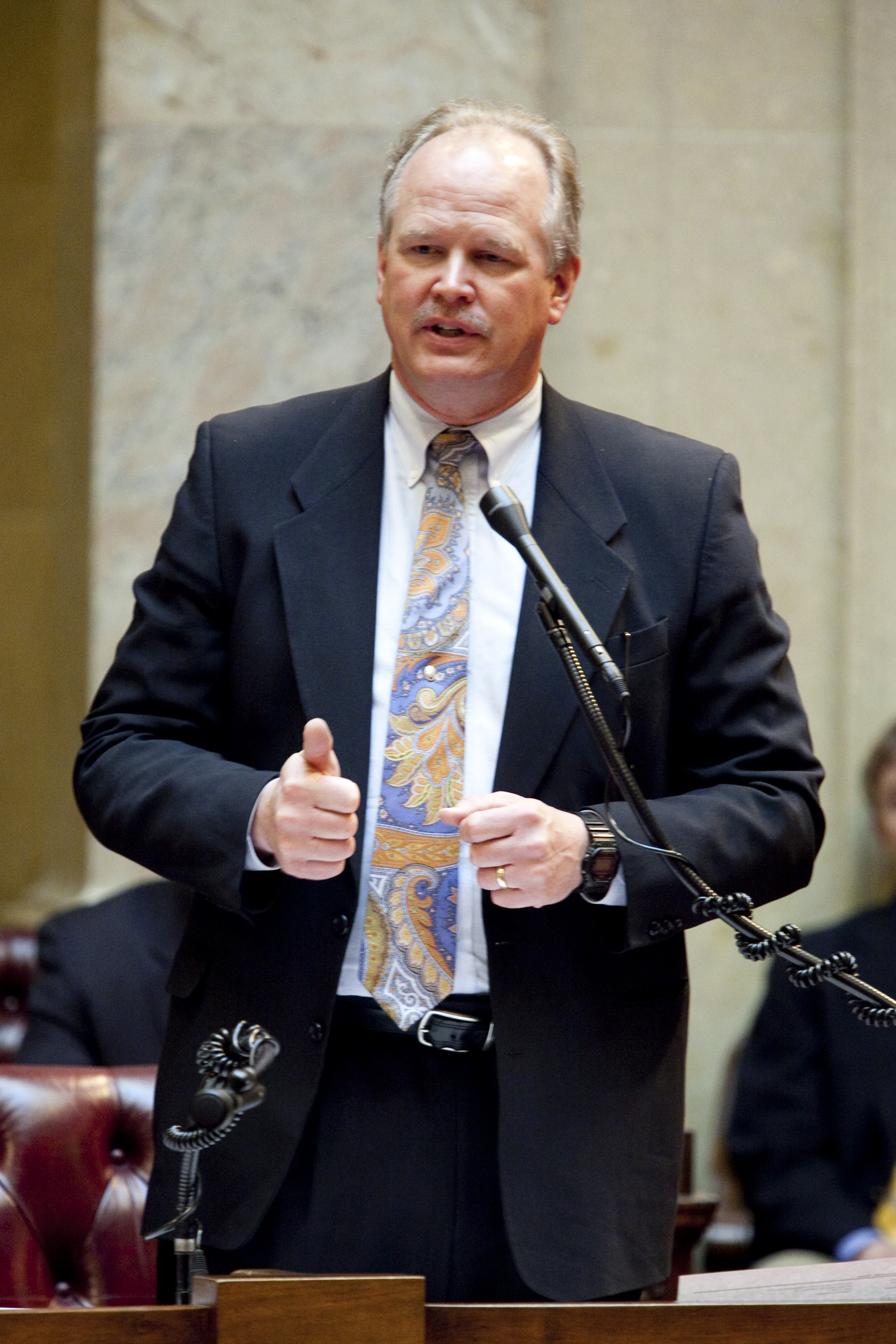
	Majority party	Minority party
Leader	Judy Robson	Dale Schultz
Party	Democratic	Republican
Leader since	January 3, 2005	January 3, 2005
Leader's seat	15th–Beloit	17th–Richland Center
Last election	8 seats, TBD%	8 seats, TBD%
Seats before	14	19
Seats won	10	7
Seats after	18	15
Seat change	▲4	▼4
Popular vote	512,068	507,659
Percentage	49.68%	49.25%
Swing	▲4.99%	▼3.81%
- Democratic hold Democratic gain Republican hold No election 50–60% 60–70% >90% 50–60% 60–70% >90% No election
President before election
Alan Lasee
Republican
Elected President
Fred Risser
Democratic

The 2006 Wisconsin Senate election was held on Tuesday November 7, 2006, to determine which party would control the Wisconsin Senate for the following two years in the 98th Wisconsin Legislature. The seventeen odd-numbered districts of the 33 seat Wisconsin Senate were up for election. Prior to the election 19 seats were held by Republicans and 14 were held by Democrats. This election saw Democrats regaining control of the Wisconsin Senate after having lost control of the chamber following the 2002 election.

The primary was held on September 12, 2006.

== Predictions ==
Source	Ranking	As of
Rothenberg	Lean R	November 4, 2006

== Summary ==
Seats		Party (majority caucus shading)		Total
Seats		Democratic	Republican	Total
Last election (2004)		8	8	16
Total after last election (2004)		14	19	33
Total before this election		14	19	33
Up for election		6	11	17
of which:	Incumbent retiring	0	1	1
of which:	Vacated	0	0	0
of which:	Unopposed	2	2	4
This election		10	7	17
Change from last election		▲4	▼4	Steady
Total after this election		18	15	33
Change in total		▲4	▼4	Steady

Popular vote
Democratic	49.68%
Republican	49.25%
Green	0.07%

Senate seats won
Democratic	54.55%
Republican	45.45%

=== Close races ===
Seats where the margin of victory was under 10%:

- State Senate district 23, 1.75% (gain)
- State Senate district 31, 3.25% (gain)
- State Senate district 5, 3.52% (gain)
- State Senate district 21, 6.13% (gain)
- State Senate district 17, 8.41%

== Outgoing incumbents ==
=== Retired ===
- Cathy Stepp, (R–Sturtevant), representing district 21 since 2002, declined to seek re-election.

== Candidates and results ==
Dist.	Incumbent				This race
Dist.	Member	Party	First elected	Status	General
01	Alan Lasee	Republican	1977 (special)	Incumbent re-elected	▌ ✓ Alan Lasee (Rep.) 55.12%; ▌Charlie Most (Dem.) 39.72%; ▌Jill Bussiere (Grn.) 5.07%
03	Tim Carpenter	Democratic	2002	Incumbent re-elected	▌ ✓ Tim Carpenter (Dem.) 98.51%
05	Thomas Reynolds	Republican	2002	Incumbent lost re-election. New member elected. Democratic gain.	▌ ✓ Jim Sullivan (Dem.) 51.68%; ▌Thomas G. Reynolds (Rep.) 48.16%
07	Jeffrey Plale	Democratic	2003 (special)	Incumbent re-elected	▌ ✓ Jeffrey Plale (Dem.) 62.61%; ▌Dmity Grabowski (Rep.) 31.84%; ▌Claude VanderVeen (Grn.) 5.38%
09	Joe Leibham	Republican	2002	Incumbent re-elected	▌ ✓ Joe Leibham (Rep.) 59.36%; ▌Jamie John Aulik (Dem.) 40.60%
11	Neal Kedzie	Republican	2002	Incumbent re-elected	▌ ✓ Neal Kedzie (Rep.) 67.40%; ▌L.D. Rockwell (Dem.) 32.55%
13	Scott L. Fitzgerald	Republican	1994	Incumbent re-elected	▌ ✓ Scott L. Fitzgerald (Rep.) 96.87%
15	Judy Robson	Democratic	1998	Incumbent re-elected	▌ ✓ Judy Robson (Dem.) 68.18%; ▌Gregory Addie (Rep.) 31.66%
17	Dale Schultz	Republican	1990	Incumbent re-elected	▌ ✓ Dale Schultz (Rep.) 54.19%; ▌John J. Simonson (Dem.) 45.78%
19	Michael Ellis	Republican	1982	Incumbent re-elected	▌ ✓ Michael Ellis (Rep.) 98.66%
21	Cathy Stepp	Republican	2002	Incumbent retired. New member elected. Democratic gain.	▌ ✓ John Lehman (Dem.) 53.03%; ▌William L. McReynolds (Rep.) 46.90%
23	David Zien	Republican	1992	Incumbent lost re-election. New member elected. Democratic gain.	▌ ✓ Pat Kreitlow (Dem.) 50.84%; ▌Dave Zien (Rep.) 49.09%
25	Bob Jauch	Democratic	1986	Incumbent re-elected	▌ ✓ Robert Jauch (Dem.) 62.24%; ▌Shirley J. Riedmann (Rep.) 37.70%
27	Jon Erpenbach	Democratic	1998	Incumbent re-elected	▌ ✓ Jon Erpenbach (Dem.) 99.32%
29	Russ Decker	Democratic	1990	Incumbent re-elected	▌ ✓ Russ Decker (Dem.) 62.24%; ▌Jimmy Boy Edming (Rep.) 32.28%
31	Ron Brown	Republican	2002	Incumbent lost re-election. New member elected. Democratic gain.	✓ Kathleen Vinehout (Dem.) 51.58%; Ron Brown (Rep.) 48.33%
33	Theodore Kanavas	Republican	2001 (special)	Incumbent re-elected	▌ ✓ Theodore Kanavas (Rep.) 67.29%; ▌Andrew Stiffler (Dem.) 32.66%

== See also ==
- 2006 Wisconsin elections
  - 2006 Wisconsin gubernatorial election
  - 2006 Wisconsin State Assembly election
  - 2006 United States Senate election in Wisconsin
  - 2006 United States House of Representatives elections in Wisconsin
