= Lorman =

Lorman may refer to:

- Barbara Lorman, American politician
- Lorman, Mississippi, unincorporated community in the United States
