= Tim Carpenter =

American politician (born 1960)

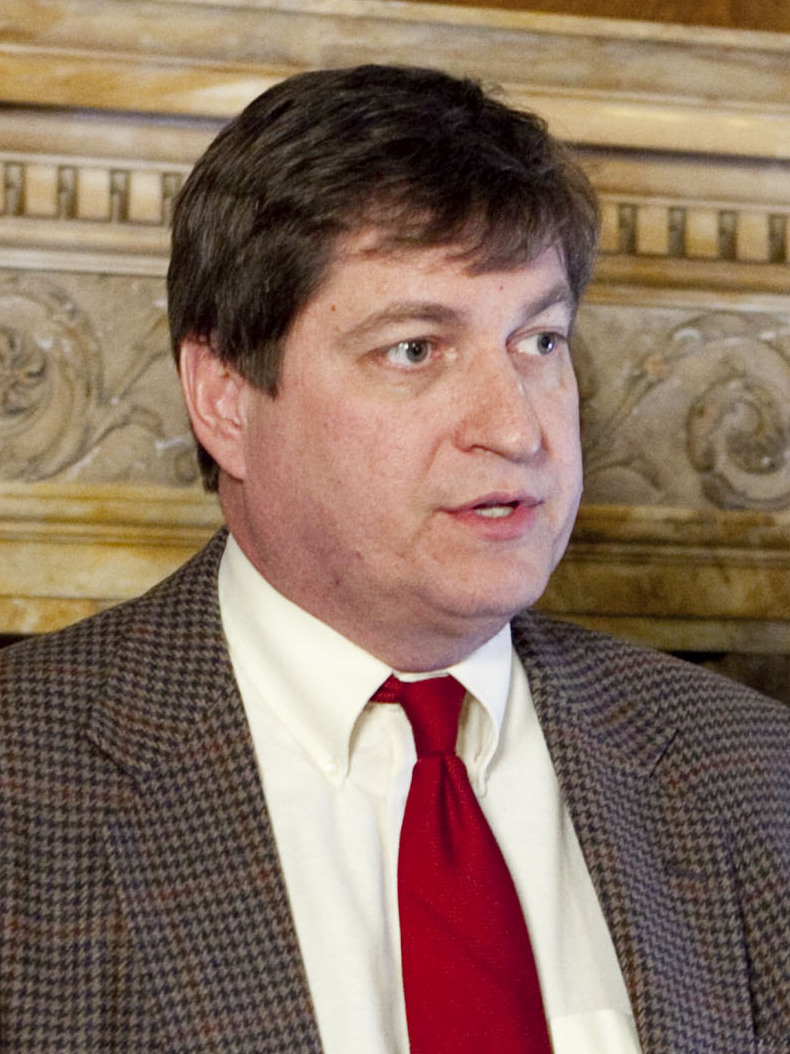
- Carpenter in 2009

President pro tempore of the Wisconsin Senate
- In office July 16, 2012 – January 7, 2013
- Preceded by: Joe Leibham
- Succeeded by: Joe Leibham

Member of the Wisconsin Senate from the 3rd district
- Incumbent
- Assumed office January 6, 2003
- Preceded by: Brian Burke

Speaker pro tempore of the Wisconsin State Assembly
- In office January 4, 1993 – January 1995
- Preceded by: David Clarenbach
- Succeeded by: Stephen Freese

Member of the Wisconsin State Assembly
- In office January 4, 1993 – January 6, 2003
- Preceded by: Walter Kunicki
- Succeeded by: Josh Zepnick
- Constituency: 9th district
- In office January 3, 1985 – January 4, 1993
- Preceded by: James F. Rooney
- Succeeded by: Rosemary Potter
- Constituency: 20th district

Personal details
- Born: February 24, 1960 (age 66) Milwaukee, Wisconsin, U.S.
- Party: Democratic
- Education: Marquette University (attended); University of Wisconsin, Milwaukee (BA); University of Wisconsin, Madison (MA)
- Website: State Senate website

Timothy W. Carpenter (born February 24, 1960) is an American Democratic politician from Milwaukee, Wisconsin. He has been a member of the Wisconsin Senate for more than 20 years, representing the Wisconsin's 3rd Senate district since 2003. His district comprises much of the south side of the city of Milwaukee. He previously served 18 years in the Wisconsin State Assembly (1985–2003).

== Early life and education ==
Carpenter was born on February 24, 1960, at St. Francis Hospital in Milwaukee. He graduated from Milwaukee's Casimir Pulaski High School and attended Marquette University in 1978, before transferring to University of Wisconsin–Milwaukee, where he received his bachelor's degree in political science and history in 1982. He continued graduate work at Milwaukee, but was interrupted when he was elected to the Legislature in 1984. He later resumed his education at the La Follette School of Public Affairs at the University of Wisconsin–Madison, where he earned his master's degree in 1995.

== Political career ==
After graduating from college, Carpenter worked briefly at a number of jobs, at Rustlers Steak House and as a courier for Federal Express. He had become involved with the Democratic Party of Wisconsin at an early age and became a member of the state party's administrative committee.

Carpenter made his first bid for elected office in 1984, at age 24, while still a student at the La Follette School of Public Affairs. He announced he would run for Wisconsin State Assembly in the 20th district seat being vacated by the retirement of James F. Rooney. The 20th Assembly district was heavily Democratic, based in southern Milwaukee—Carpenter faced five opponents in the Democratic primary. He prevailed in the six-way race with just 27% of the vote, and faced no opponent in the 1984 general election.

He went on to serve four terms representing the 20th district before the 1992 court-ordered redistricting, which shifted him into the 9th Assembly district. He won five more terms in the 9th district, remaining in the Assembly until 2003. He briefly served in caucus leadership when Democrats held the majority in the early part of the 1993 term, and served as speaker pro tempore.

In 2002, incumbent state senator Brian Burke announced his retirement, and Carpenter entered the race to succeed him in the 3rd state Senate district. During the 2007–08 biennium, he served as President Pro Tempore of the Wisconsin State Senate. He faced two opponents in the primary, including former state senator Roman R. Blenski; Blenski, at age 85, died before the primary election, however, and Carpenter prevailed with 53% of the vote. He was unopposed in the general election and took office in January 2003.

=== 2004 U.S. House campaign ===
In 2004, Milwaukee's 20-year incumbent U.S. representative Jerry Kleczka announced he would retire. At the time, Wisconsin's 4th congressional district contained virtually all of the city of Milwaukee; Carpenter and north-side state senator Gwen Moore entered the race, as did former Democratic Party of Wisconsin chair Matt Flynn. Carpenter finished in a distant third place with only 10% of the vote. Moore won the primary and the election, and became Wisconsin's first African American representative in Congress.

=== Legislative majority (2007–2010) ===
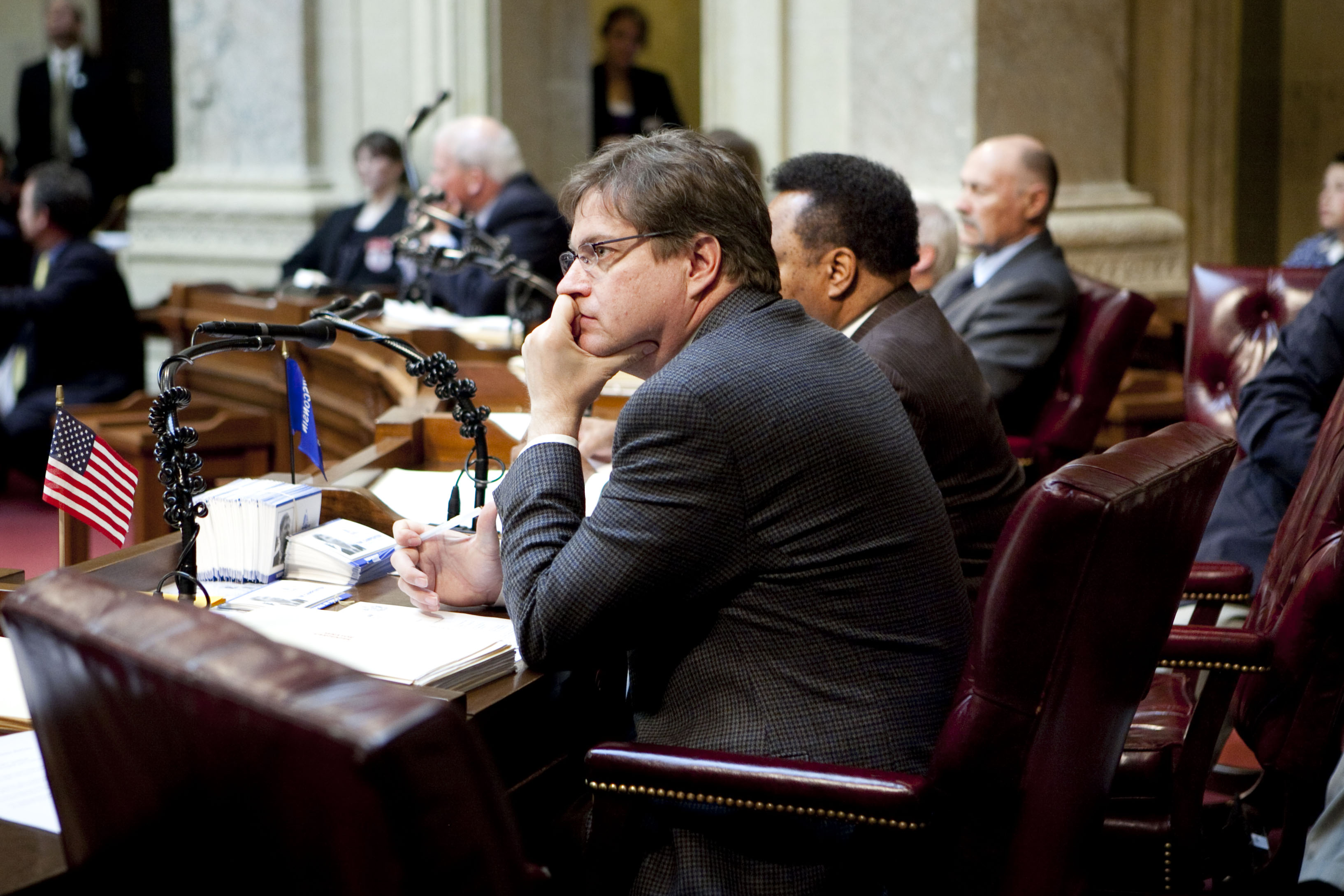
Carpenter in 2009

When Democrats achieved a Senate majority in the 2007–2008 term, Carpenter was elected chair of the Senate Committee on Public Health, Senior Issues, Long Term Care, and Job Creation, and served as vice chair of the Committee on Small Business, Emergency Preparedness, Workforce Development, Technical Colleges and Consumer Protection. In the 2009–2010 term, he was also co-chair of the Committee on Law Revision, and vice chair of the Committee on Health, Health Insurance, Privacy, Property Tax Relief, and Revenue.

=== 2011 Wisconsin protests ===
In the 2010 election, Republicans won full control of Wisconsin state government, part of a national backlash against the Democratic Party over the slow economic recovery from the Great Recession, and the then-controversial Affordable Care Act. Immediately after taking office, Wisconsin governor Scott Walker advanced a bill to strip public employee unions of their collective bargaining power, euphemistically titled the "Budget Repair Bill". The announcement sparked mass protests at the Wisconsin State Capitol.

As Republicans raced to pass the legislation, Democratic state senators decided that their only tool to slow down passage was to deny the Republicans a quorum. To avoid being arrested and forced back to the capitol by state police, Carpenter and 13 other Democratic state senators fled to neighboring Illinois. The situation received national media attention. During the standoff, Governor Walker was tricked by a prank phone call; believing he was talking to billionaire political contributor David Koch, Walker spoke freely about the situation making some embarrassing statements. The blogger who perpetrated the prank, Ian Murphy, later said that he was inspired to do so after reading Tim Carpenter's interview with Amanda Terkel of Huffington Post, in which Carpenter explained that Walker was not even attempting to negotiate with the Democrats, and would not take their phone calls.

The standoff eventually ended when Republicans in the Senate stripped out budgetary items from the bill, enabling them to circumvent budget-related quorum rules.

The Democrats briefly regained the Senate majority in 2012 due to the 2012 Wisconsin Senate recall elections, and during the remainder of that term, Carpenter served as president pro tempore of the Senate.

=== Milwaukee City Treasurer race (2012) ===
In February 2012, Carpenter was one of two State Senators (the other being fellow Democrat Spencer Coggs) to win a place on the ballot for Milwaukee City Treasurer in the Spring 2012 election, defeating former State Treasurer Dawn Marie Sass and Socialist Rick Kissell in the non-partisan primary. Coggs polled 13,559 votes; Carpenter 12,880; Sass 5,089 and Kissell 2,241. In the general election, Coggs won 35,096 votes to Carpenter's 34,293.

=== Milwaukee Common Council race (2015) ===
In 2015, Carpenter ran in a special election for the Milwaukee Common Council on August 18, 2015. A primary took place on July 21, 2015. Carpenter advanced in the primary along with Mark Borkowski, who ended up winning with 50.7% of the vote.

=== 2020 protests ===
On June 23, 2020, Carpenter was recording a protest near the Wisconsin State Capitol when he was assaulted by Black Lives Matter protesters. A short time later he collapsed and was taken to the hospital for a suspected concussion.

== Personal life ==
Carpenter is gay, and is one of three openly LGBTQ members of the Wisconsin Legislature. He is a member of the Sierra Club, Jackson Park Neighborhood Association, Story Hill Neighborhood Association, and the Milwaukee VA Soldiers Home Advisory Council.

== Electoral history ==
=== Wisconsin Assembly, 20th district (1984–1990) ===
Year	Election	Date	Elected				Defeated				Total	Plurality
1984	Primary	Sep. 11	Tim Carpenter	Democratic	2,021	27.53%	Stephen P. Kotecki	Dem.	1,625	22.13%	7,342	396
1984	Primary	Sep. 11	Tim Carpenter	Democratic	2,021	27.53%	Terry L. Witkowski	Dem.	1,312	17.87%	7,342	396
1984	Primary	Sep. 11	Tim Carpenter	Democratic	2,021	27.53%	William G. Hart	Dem.	1,202	16.37%	7,342	396
1984	Primary	Sep. 11	Tim Carpenter	Democratic	2,021	27.53%	Carl A. Kopps	Dem.	1,139	15.51%	7,342	396
1984	Primary	Sep. 11	Tim Carpenter	Democratic	2,021	27.53%	Jack H. Gleason	Dem.	43	0.59%	7,342	396
1984	General	Nov. 6	Tim Carpenter	Democratic	18,107	100.0%					18,107	18,107
1986	Primary	Sep. 9	Tim Carpenter (inc.)	Democratic	3,538	65.51%	Stephen P. Kotecki	Dem.	1,863	34.49%	5,401	1,675
1986	General	Nov. 4	Tim Carpenter (inc.)	Democratic	11,081	70.53%	Jerome D. Schultz	Rep.	4,630	29.47%	15,711	6,451
1988	General	Nov. 8	Tim Carpenter (inc.)	Democratic	17,870	100.0%					17,870	17,870
1990	General	Nov. 6	Tim Carpenter (inc.)	Democratic	8,872	67.17%	Dorothy Wosick Seidl	Rep.	4,336	32.83%	13,208	4,536

=== Wisconsin Assembly, 9th district (1992–2000) ===
Year	Election	Date	Elected				Defeated				Total	Plurality
1992	General	Nov. 3	Tim Carpenter	Democratic	17,790	100.0%					17,790	17,790
1994	General	Nov. 8	Tim Carpenter (inc.)	Democratic	9,569	59.33%	James T. Sanfilippo	Rep.	6,559	40.67%	16,128	3,010
1996	Primary	Sep. 10	Tim Carpenter (inc.)	Democratic	3,312	72.44%	James T. Sanfilippo	Dem.	1,260	27.56%	4,572	2,052
1996	General	Nov. 5	Tim Carpenter (inc.)	Democratic	14,758	100.0%					14,758	14,758
1998	General	Nov. 3	Tim Carpenter (inc.)	Democratic	11,418	100.0%					11,418	11,418
2000	General	Nov. 7	Tim Carpenter (inc.)	Democratic	14,244	70.60%	Richard T. Mannisto	Rep.	5,863	29.06%	20,176	8,381

=== U.S. House (2004) ===
Year	Election	Date	Elected				Defeated				Total	Plurality
2004	Primary	Sep. 14	Gwen Moore	Democratic	48,858	64.20%	Matt Flynn	Dem.	19,377	25.46%	76,103	29,481
2004	Primary	Sep. 14	Gwen Moore	Democratic	48,858	64.20%	Tim Carpenter	Dem.	7,801	10.25%	76,103	29,481

=== Wisconsin Senate (2002–present) ===
Year	Election	Date	Elected				Defeated				Total	Plurality
2002	Primary	Sep. 10	Tim Carpenter	Democratic	8,491	52.92%	Pat Farley	Dem.	5,328	33.21%	16,044	3,163
2002	Primary	Sep. 10	Tim Carpenter	Democratic	8,491	52.92%	Roman R. Blenski (deceased)	Dem.	2,187	13.63%	16,044	3,163
2002	General	Nov. 5	Tim Carpenter	Democratic	24,431	97.96%					24,939	23,923
2006	General	Nov. 7	Tim Carpenter (inc.)	Democratic	30,768	98.51%					31,232	30,304
2010	General	Nov. 2	Tim Carpenter (inc.)	Democratic	23,401	61.09%	Annette Miller Krznarich	Rep.	14,796	38.63%	38,305	8,605
2014	General	Nov. 4	Tim Carpenter (inc.)	Democratic	29,291	97.10%					30,166	28,416
2018	General	Nov. 6	Tim Carpenter (inc.)	Democratic	36,875	97.40%					37,860	35,890
2022	General	Nov. 8	Tim Carpenter (inc.)	Democratic	27,958	68.98%	Angel Sanchez	Rep.	12,536	30.93%	40,533	15,422

Wisconsin State Assembly
Preceded by David Clarenbach	Speaker pro tempore of the Wisconsin Assembly; 1993–1995	Succeeded by Stephen Freese
Wisconsin Senate
Preceded by Joe Leibham	President pro tempore of the Wisconsin Senate; 2012–2013	Succeeded by Joe Leibham
