= Pam Galloway =

American physician, surgeon, and former politician

Member of the Wisconsin Senate from the 29th district
- In office January 3, 2011 – March 16, 2012
- Preceded by: Russ Decker
- Succeeded by: Jerry Petrowski

Personal details
- Born: September 11, 1955 (age 70)
- Party: Republican
- Spouse: Dr. Christopher Magiera
- Profession: Physician

Pam Galloway (born September 11, 1955) is an American physician and surgeon and a former Republican member of the Wisconsin Senate, representing the 29th District from 2011 through her resignation on March 16, 2012.

== Early life and career ==
Galloway graduated with a BA from the University of Chicago in 1976, and earned her MD from the University of Virginia in 1980. Galloway is a member of a number of medical committees, and was the past Chairperson of the Marathon Republican Party.

== Political career ==
=== Wisconsin Senate ===
She was elected to the Wisconsin Senate in 2010, defeating incumbent Democrat Russ Decker.

She had been facing an effort to recall her from office. However, on March 16, 2012, Galloway announced her resignation from office due to health issues in her family, leaving the Senate evenly split between Democrats and Republicans. Galloway's seat was filled in the recall election, which had already been scheduled. She was succeeded by fellow Republican Jerry Petrowski.

=== Indiana politics ===
Following her resignation Galloway relocated to Warsaw, Indiana as to be closer to members of her extended family. In 2014 she chaired the campaign committee for Republican Curt Nisly, who was elected to the Indiana House of Representatives in 2014. In May 2015 Galloway announced she would run to succeed Marlin Stutzman in the United States House of Representatives for Indiana's 3rd congressional district. Soon after she was joined by Indiana state senator Jim Banks and later by state senator Liz Brown. During the campaign, Galloway largely self-funded her efforts, mustering up $388,095 by the end of the primary campaign. In the primary election, Galloway came in fourth place with 7.03% of the vote.

== Electoral history ==
=== Wisconsin Senate (2010) ===
Year	Election	Date	Elected				Defeated				Total	Plurality
2010	Primary	Sep. 14	Pam Galloway	Republican	10,351	70.45%	Jimmy Boy Edming	Rep.	4,332	29.49%	14,692	6,019
2010	General	Nov. 2	Pam Galloway	Republican	32,640	52.26%	Russ Decker (inc)	Dem.	29,742	47.62%	62,452	2,898

=== U.S. House, Indiana's 3rd district (2016) ===
Year	Election	Date	Elected				Defeated				Total	Plurality
2016	Primary	May. 3	Jim Banks	Republican	46,533	34.29%	Kip E. Tom	Rep.	42,732	31.50%	135,698	3,801
2016	Primary	May. 3	Jim Banks	Republican	46,533	34.29%	Liz Brown	Rep.	33,654	24.80%	135,698	3,801
2016	Primary	May. 3	Jim Banks	Republican	46,533	34.29%	Pam Galloway	Rep.	9,543	7.03%	135,698	3,801
2016	Primary	May. 3	Jim Banks	Republican	46,533	34.29%	Kevin Howell	Rep.	1,970	1.45%	135,698	3,801
2016	Primary	May. 3	Jim Banks	Republican	46,533	34.29%	Mark Willard Baringer	Rep.	1,266	0.93%	135,698	3,801
