= James W. Edming =

American Republican politician (b. 1945)

James Edming

Member of the Wisconsin State Assembly from the 87th district
- In office January 5, 2015 – January 6, 2025
- Preceded by: Mary Williams
- Succeeded by: Brent Jacobson

Personal details
- Born: November 22, 1945 (age 80) Ladysmith, Wisconsin, U.S.
- Party: Republican
- Spouse: Marty
- Children: 3
- Profession: businessman, politician
- Website: Official website
- Nickname: "Jimmy Boy"

James W. Edming (born November 22, 1945) is a retired American businessman and Republican politician from Rusk County, Wisconsin. He served five terms as a member of the Wisconsin State Assembly, representing Wisconsin's 87th Assembly district from 2015 to 2025.

== Biography ==
From Glen Flora, Wisconsin, Edming graduated from Flambeau High School in Tony, Wisconsin, in 1964. He earned a teaching certificate from the Taylor County Teacher's College in 1967 and attended various other University of Wisconsin System institutions, but did not receive another degree.

He became an entrepreneur and, in 1972, became the owner of Edming Oil Company, a gas station and convenience store. He went on, in 1974, to become the owner of Edming Manufacturing Co., a livestock feed and farm supply company. In the 1980s, he founded OvenWorks Pizza, a manufacturer of frozen pizzas.

He served on the Rusk County Board of Supervisors from 1978 to 1988, and served on the Rusk County Hospital Board from 1980 to 1982, and again from 2010 to 2018.

In 2002 and 2006 Edming was the nominee for Wisconsin's 29th senate district, being defeated both times by incumbent Russ Decker. In 2010, Edming again ran for the nomination, but was defeated by Pam Galloway, who went on to defeat Decker in the general election.

In 2014, he entered the race for Wisconsin State Assembly in the 87th district following the announcement that six-term incumbent Mary Williams would retire at the end of that term. The Republican primary was extremely close, a recount ordered by the Wisconsin Government Accountability Board found Edming the winner by a mere 17 votes over his primary opponent Michael Bub. Edming went on to win the general election with 66% of the vote. He was subsequently reelected in 2016, 2018, 2020 and 2022.

Following the 2024 redistricting, Edming declined to seek re-election.

== Electoral history ==
=== Wisconsin Senate (2002–2010) ===
Year	Election	Date	Elected				Defeated				Total	Plurality
2002	General	Nov. 5	Russ Decker (inc)	Democratic	38,779	68.05%	Jimmy Boy Edming	Rep.	18,201	31.94%	56,989	20,578
2006	General	Nov. 7	Russ Decker (inc)	Democratic	42,139	67.68%	Jimmy Boy Edming	Rep.	20,101	32.28%	62,265	22,038
2010	Primary	Sep. 14	Pam Galloway	Republican	10,351	70.45%	Jimmy Boy Edming	Rep.	4,332	29.49%	14,692	6,019

=== Wisconsin Assembly (2014–2022) ===
Year	Election	Date	Elected				Defeated				Total	Plurality
2014	Primary	Aug. 26	James W. Edming	Republican	1,452	28.00%	Michael Bub	Rep.	1,433	27.64%	5,185	19
2014	Primary	Aug. 26	James W. Edming	Republican	1,452	28.00%	Shirl Labarre	Rep.	1,339	25.82%	5,185	19
2014	Primary	Aug. 26	James W. Edming	Republican	1,452	28.00%	Scott Kenneth Noble	Rep.	960	18.51%	5,185	19
2014	General	Nov. 4	James W. Edming	Republican	14,121	66.37%	Richard Pulcher	Dem.	7,098	33.36%	21,277	7,023
2014	General	Nov. 4	James W. Edming	Republican	14,121	66.37%	Michael Bub (write-in)	Rep.	52	0.03%	21,277	7,023
2016	General	Nov. 8	James W. Edming (inc)	Republican	18,179	67.97%	Elizabeth Riley	Dem.	8,554	31.98%	26,745	9,625
2018	General	Nov. 6	James W. Edming (inc)	Republican	15,682	66.12%	Elizabeth Riley	Dem.	8,027	33.84%	23,719	7,655
2020	General	Nov. 3	James W. Edming (inc)	Republican	21,595	70.83%	Richard Pulcher	Dem.	8,887	29.15%	30,490	12,708
2022	General	Nov. 8	James W. Edming (inc)	Republican	18,532	69.49%	Elizabeth Riley	Dem.	8,127	30.48%	26,667	10,405

Wisconsin State Assembly
Preceded by Mary Williams	Member of the Wisconsin State Assembly from the 87th district January 5, 2015 – January 6, 2025	Succeeded by Brent Jacobson
