= Russ Decker =

American politician

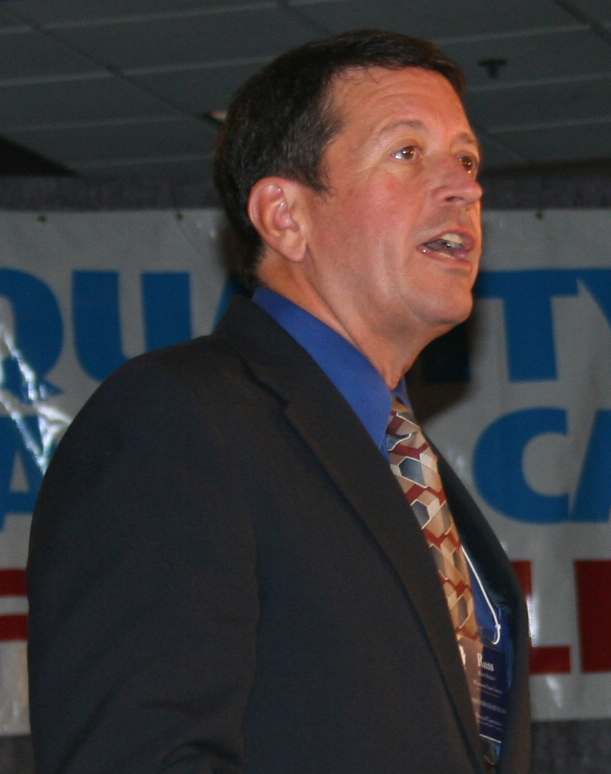
- Decker in 2008.

Majority Leader of the Wisconsin Senate
- In office October 24, 2007 – December 15, 2010
- Preceded by: Judy Robson
- Succeeded by: Dave Hansen
- In office October 21, 2002 – January 6, 2003 Serving with Fred Risser
- Preceded by: Charles Chvala
- Succeeded by: Mary Panzer

Member of the Wisconsin Senate from the 29th district
- In office January 7, 1991 – January 3, 2011
- Preceded by: Walter Chilsen
- Succeeded by: Pam Galloway

Personal details
- Born: May 25, 1953 (age 73) Athens, Wisconsin, U.S.
- Party: Democratic
- Spouse: married
- Children: 2
- Education: Northcentral Technical College
- Profession: bricklayer, union leader

Russell S. Decker (born May 25, 1953) is a retired American bricklayer and former Democratic politician. He served 20 years in the Wisconsin State Senate (1991–2011) and was majority leader from October 2007 through December 2010.

== Early life and career ==
Born in Athens, Wisconsin, Decker graduated from Athens High School, afterward attending Northcentral Technical College in Wausau, Wisconsin as an apprentice bricklayer.

== Political career ==
Decker was first elected to the Senate in 1990, and was re-elected four more times, serving a total of five terms.

Following the passage of the 2007-2009 state budget, the Senate Democratic Caucus voted to remove Judy Robson. The removal had led by Decker, who argued that Robson had betrayed Democratic principles. After her removal, Decker was elected as the next Democratic co-caucus leader, alongside Senator Fred Risser.

=== DUI ===
In April 2005, Decker was arrested and charged with OWI. He pleaded guilty to the lesser charge of driving with a prohibited blood alcohol content and had to give up his driver's license for six months.

=== 2009-2010 budget ===
Decker attracted controversy in 2009 when he voted to attach an amendment to the yearly budget, which had to be voted on in the state senate. The amendment would have required the Government Accountability Board to use similar processes that other state agencies use to request funding, which is through legislative approval. This amendment drew sharp criticism from organizations supporting government transparency like Common Cause, which argued that the amendment would defeat the purpose of the G.A.B and undermine the agency's ability to effectively investigate the legislature should it need to. Decker's staff justified the amendment, arguing "Many people felt [the board] needed to justify their budget like everyone else."

=== 2010 Lame duck session ===
On November 2, 2010, Republican Pam Galloway defeated Decker in his reelection bid.

Following the 2010 elections, Wisconsin Democrats convened for a special session in December. Part of the special session included votes on ratifying new contracts for state employees, which had been negotiated by outgoing Governor Jim Doyle. Decker had grown distant with the rest of the Democratic caucus following his defeat in the election, and was described as difficult to reach by several fellow Democratic legislators. Earlier in the day, Decker had voted with the rest of Democrats in committee to put the state contracts to a floor vote. He eventually attended the session, with him and fellow outgoing Democrat Jeffrey Plale voting alongside all 15 Republican senators to reject the first of seventeen contracts. Decker justified his vote arguing that the next legislature, which would be controlled by Republicans, could negotiate and vote on the contracts.

Due to his vote against the first contract, the Democrats quickly convened a caucus where they voted to remove him from his position as Democratic caucus leader, nominating Senator Dave Hansen to replace him for the remainder of the session. Following his removal, Decker and Plale voted alongside Republicans on the other sixteen contracts, all of which faced 16–16 tie votes and failed to pass.

In the aftermath of the vote, Decker was subject to speculation and allegations that he had unsuccessfully attempted to persuade governor Doyle to pardon former Democratic Caucus leader Charles Chvala, who had been convicted for his role in the 2002 Caucus Scandal. Speculation pointed to Decker's connections with Chvala, a close ally and mentor of Decker, and Chvala's wife, Barbara Worcester, who served as Decker's chief of staff. It was also rumored, although ultimately never came to be, that Decker had been looking to gain a position in the incoming administration of Scott Walker, which had been what happened to Jeff Plale, as he would come to serve as the Administrator of the Wisconsin Division of State Facilities and later as the Wisconsin Commissioner of Railroads. This never came to pass and Decker retired from politics altogether.

== Personal life ==
Decker lives in Ashland, Wisconsin with his second wife.

== Electoral history ==
=== Wisconsin Senate (1990–2010) ===
Year	Election	Date	Elected				Defeated				Total	Plurality
1990	General	Nov. 6	Russ Decker	Democratic	24,587	50.66%	Walter Chilsen (inc)	Rep.	23,947	49.34%	48,534	640
1994	General	Nov. 8	Russ Decker (inc)	Democratic	31,422	62.58%	Michael D. Stefonik	Rep.	18,791	37.42%	50,213	12,631
1998	General	Nov. 3	Russ Decker (inc)	Democratic	32,644	62.45%	Dan Krcma	Rep.	19,628	37.55%	52,272	13,016
2002	General	Nov. 5	Russ Decker (inc)	Democratic	38,779	68.05%	Jimmy Boy Edming	Rep.	18,201	31.94%	56,989	20,578
2006	General	Nov. 7	Russ Decker (inc)	Democratic	42,139	67.68%	Jimmy Boy Edming	Rep.	20,101	32.28%	62,265	22,038
2010	General	Nov. 2	Pam Galloway	Republican	32,640	52.26%	Russ Decker (inc)	Dem.	29,742	47.62%	62,452	2,898

Wisconsin Senate
Preceded by Walter Chilsen	Member of the Wisconsin Senate from the 29th district January 7, 1991 – January 3, 2011	Succeeded by Pam Galloway
Preceded by Charles Chvala	Majority Leader of the Wisconsin Senate; October 21, 2002 – January 6, 2003; Served alongside: Fred Risser	Succeeded by Mary Panzer
Preceded by Judy Robson	Majority Leader of the Wisconsin Senate; October 24, 2007 – December 15, 2010	Succeeded by Scott L. Fitzgerald
