= Neal Kedzie =

American politician (born 1956)

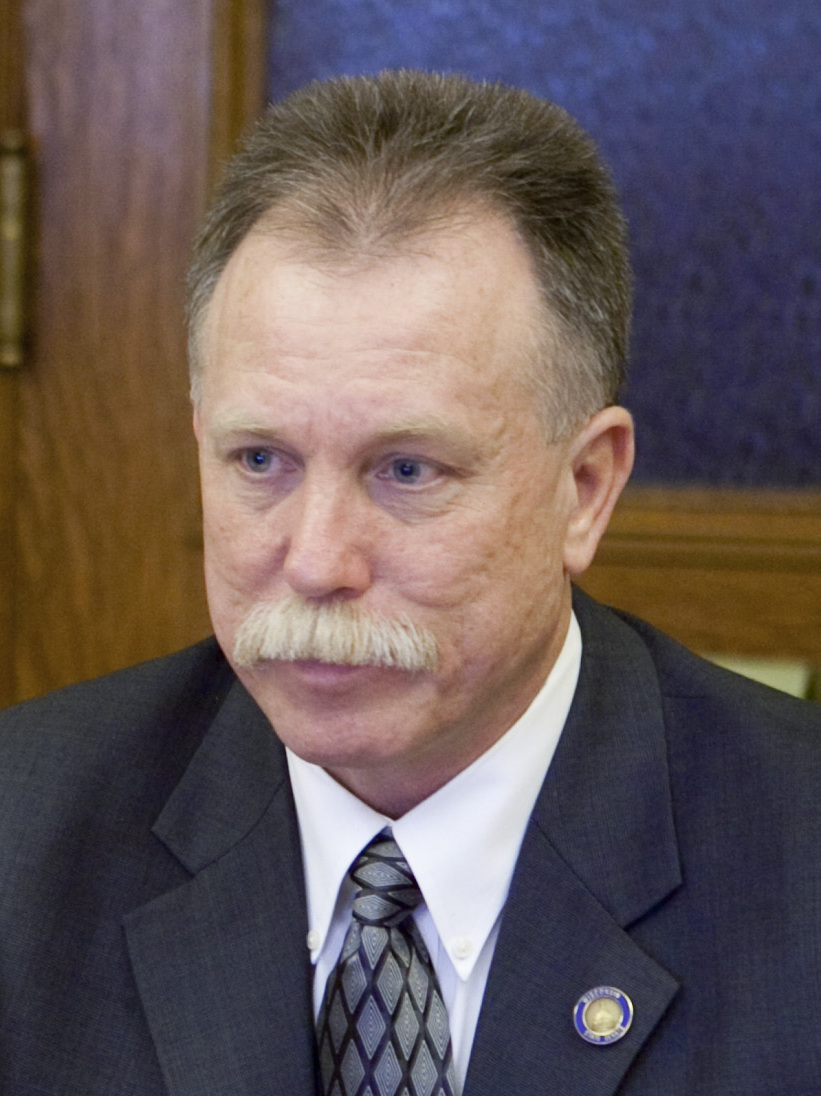
- Kedzie in 2009

Member of the Wisconsin Senate from the 11th district
- In office January 6, 2003 – June 16, 2014
- Preceded by: Joanne Huelsman
- Succeeded by: Stephen Nass

Member of the Wisconsin State Assembly from the 43rd district
- In office January 6, 1997 – January 6, 2003
- Preceded by: Charles Coleman
- Succeeded by: Debi Towns

Personal details
- Born: January 27, 1956 (age 70) Waukesha, Wisconsin, U.S.
- Party: Republican
- Spouse: Kerrie A. Adams (m. 1979)
- Children: 3
- Education: University of Wisconsin–Whitewater
- Occupation: Lobbyist, politician

Neal J. Kedzie (born January 27, 1956) is an American lobbyist and Republican politician from Walworth County, Wisconsin. He served 11 years in the Wisconsin Senate, representing the 11th Senate district from 2003 until his sudden retirement in June 2014. He previously served six years in the Wisconsin State Assembly, and was chairman of the board of supervisors of the town of La Grange for ten years. Since leaving office, he has worked as a lobbyist for the Wisconsin trucking industry as president of the Wisconsin Motor Carriers Association.

== Early life and education ==
Neal Kedzie was born in Waukesha, Wisconsin. As a child, he moved with his family to Oak Creek, Wisconsin; he graduated from Oak Creek High School in 1974. He went on to attend the University of Wisconsin–Whitewater, where he earned his bachelor's degree in 1978. After college, Kedzie remained in Walworth County, Wisconsin, settling in Elkhorn.

He worked for the next decade as facilities manager for the Girl Scouts of Racine County. In 1987, he was hired by Wisconsin Southern Gas Company as commercial and industrial coorinator in the marketing department. Six years later, he became government relations representative for Wisconsin Electric Power Company.

== Political career ==
In 1987, Kedzie first entered public office when he was elected to the town board of supervisors of La Grange, Wisconsin. He was chosen as chairman of the board the next year, and remained in that role until he left the board in 1998. During these years, he was also a member of the Lauderdale–La Grange Volunteer Fire Department.

In 1996, incumbent state representative Charles Coleman announced he would not run for re-election. Kedzie chose to enter the race for the Republican Party nomination to succeed Coleman in the Wisconsin State Assembly. He faced two opponents in the primary, Herbert Erickson, then the village president of Williams Bay, Wisconsin, and Wayne K. Weiser, an ambassador of the Delavan Chamber of Commerce. Kedzie ran on his experience in local government and his business career, winning the primary with 47% of the vote. He easily prevailed in the general election in the heavily Republican district. He went on to win re-election twice, in 1998 and 2000.

Shortly after his inauguration in the Assembly, Kedzie joined the Wisconsin Civil Air Patrol with the Wisconsin Legislative Squadron made up of pilot hobbyists in the Wisconsin Legislature. By 2002, he held the rank of major in the organization.

In 2002, Wisconsin's legislature was redistricted by court order after they failed to pass redistricting legislation. Under the new map, Joanne Huelsman, the incumbent senator in Wisconsin's 11th Senate district, was drawn out of that district, creating a vacancy. Kedzie was also negatively impacted by redistricting in his Assembly district, drawn into a new district with another Republican incumbent. As a result of the issues, Huelsman chose to retire, and Kedzie ran for her state senate seat rather than facing a primary against another incumbent state representative. Kedzie still faced another competitive Republican primary against former Delafield mayor Jim Behrend and newcomer Jack Riley. Kedzie, however, had a significant advantage in campaign funds and name recognition, and went on to win 57% of the primary vote. In the heavily Republican district, Kedzie faced another easy general election, taking 69% of the vote. He would go on to win two more terms in that district, in 2006 and 2010.

On May 6, 2014, Kedzie announced that he would not run for reelection; subsequently, on June 16, 2014, he announced that he was resigning effective immediately rather than serving out his term, to accept new employment. On July 1, 2014, he became the president of the Wisconsin Motor Carriers Association.

== Personal life and family ==
Neal Kedzie's parents were Alex and Arlene Kedzie.

Neal Kedzie married Kerrie A. Adams, of Milwaukee, on March 10, 1979, at the Catholic Church of the Immaculate Conception in Milwaukee. They have three adult children and still reside in Elkhorn.

== Electoral history ==
=== Wisconsin Assembly (1996–2000) ===
Year	Election	Date	Elected				Defeated				Total	Plurality
1996	Primary	Sep. 10	Neal J. Kedzie	Republican	1,965	47.25%	Herbert E. Erickson	Rep.	1,617	38.88%	4,159	348
1996	Primary	Sep. 10	Neal J. Kedzie	Republican	1,965	47.25%	Wayne K. Weiser	Rep.	577	13.87%	4,159	348
1996	General	Nov. 5	Neal J. Kedzie	Republican	13,251	61.71%	Charles Kelly	Dem.	7,350	34.23%	21,474	5,901
1996	General	Nov. 5	Neal J. Kedzie	Republican	13,251	61.71%	Edward J. Kozak	Lib.	873	4.07%	21,474	5,901
1998	General	Nov. 3	Neal J. Kedzie (inc)	Republican	11,119	64.19%	Ryan J. Schroeder	Dem.	6,203	35.81%	17,322	4,916
2000	General	Nov. 7	Neal J. Kedzie (inc)	Republican	17,578	68.36%	Ryan J. Schroeder	Dem.	8,126	31.60%	25,712	9,452

=== Wisconsin Senate (2002–2010) ===
Year	Election	Date	Elected				Defeated				Total	Plurality
2002	Primary	Sep. 9	Neal J. Kedzie	Republican	5,534	56.70%	Jim Behrend	Rep.	2,702	27.68%	25,712	9,452
2002	Primary	Sep. 9	Neal J. Kedzie	Republican	5,534	56.70%	Jack Riley	Rep.	1,518	15.55%	25,712	9,452
2002	General	Nov. 5	Neal J. Kedzie	Republican	36,603	69.10%	Scott Woods	Dem.	16,329	30.83%	52,968	20,274
2006	General	Nov. 7	Neal J. Kedzie (inc)	Republican	45,643	67.40%	Scott Woods	Dem.	22,038	32.54%	67,716	23,605
2010	General	Nov. 2	Neal J. Kedzie (inc)	Republican	55,121	75.37%	L. D. Rockwell	Dem.	17,955	24.55%	73,137	37,166

Wisconsin State Assembly
Preceded by Charles Coleman	Member of the Wisconsin State Assembly from the 43rd district January 6, 1997 – January 6, 2003	Succeeded by Debi Towns
Wisconsin Senate
Preceded by Joanne Huelsman	Member of the Wisconsin Senate from the 11th district January 6, 2003 – June 16, 2014	Succeeded by Stephen Nass
