= Thomas G. Reynolds =

American politician (born 1956)

Tom Reynolds

Member of the Wisconsin Senate from the 5th district
- In office January 6, 2003 – January 1, 2007
- Preceded by: Peggy Rosenzweig
- Succeeded by: Jim Sullivan

Personal details
- Born: December 16, 1956 (age 69) Milwaukee, Wisconsin, U.S.
- Party: Republican
- Spouse: Sandy Reynolds (div. 2012)
- Children: 5

Thomas Gerald Reynolds (born December 16, 1956) is an American businessman and former politician from West Allis, Wisconsin. He served one term in the Wisconsin Senate, representing Wisconsin's 5th Senate district from 2003 to 2007. Reynolds was described at the time as an ultra-conservative religious Republican, he won office after defeating a Republican incumbent in a primary challenge. In office, he was also known for eccentricities and odd behavior, including the firing of his entire staff "for disloyalty" just before Christmas 2005.

Before winning his Senate election, he made several unsuccessful bids for election to the U.S. House of Representatives. After losing re-election in 2006, he set up a short-lived political action committee to support conservative candidates in the 2008 Democratic Party legislative primaries.

== Biography ==
Reynolds was born in Milwaukee, Wisconsin and graduated from Nathan Hale High School in 1975. In addition to serving in the state senate, Reynolds is the owner of a printing business and an organic-practicing farm. He has five children.

Reynolds was elected to the Wisconsin Senate in 2002 after defeating incumbent Sen. Peggy Rosenzweig, who Reynolds claimed was too liberal, in the Republican primary that April. Before his defeat in 2006, he sat on the Committee on Housing and Financial Institutions, the Committee on Job Creation, Economic Development and Consumer Affairs, the Joint Committee for Review of Administrative Rules, and chaired the Committee on Labor and Election Process Reform. He was defeated in his bid for re-election by Democrat Jim Sullivan.

In 2008, Reynolds set up a political action committee to support conservative candidates in the 2008 Democratic Party legislative primaries. The PAC, known as Clean Sweep Wisconsin supported eight candidates, two of them failed to make the ballot, and the other six lost their primaries.

In 2010, Reynolds' wife filed for divorce. Their divorce was granted in 2012, but litigation dragged into 2013. Reynolds frequently represented himself in court. In August 2013, Reynolds was briefly jailed for contempt of court due to failure to comply with several court orders.

== Electoral history ==
=== U.S. House (1994, 1996, 1998) ===
Year	Election	Date	Elected				Defeated				Total	Plurality
1994	General	Nov. 8	Jerry Kleczka (inc)	Democratic	93,789	53.69%	Tom Reynolds	Rep.	78,225	44.78%	174,689	15,564
1994	General	Nov. 8	Jerry Kleczka (inc)	Democratic	93,789	53.69%	James H. Hause	Tax.	2,611	1.49%	174,689	15,564
1996	Primary	Sep. 10	Tom Reynolds	Republican	17,892	59.04%	J. Mac Davis	Rep.	11,676	38.53%	30,304	6,216
1996	Primary	Sep. 10	Tom Reynolds	Republican	17,892	59.04%	Gary G. Wetzel	Rep.	736	2.43%	30,304	6,216
1996	General	Nov. 5	Jerry Kleczka (inc)	Democratic	134,470	57.64%	Tom Reynolds	Rep.	98,438	42.20%	233,284	36,032
1998	General	Nov. 3	Jerry Kleczka (inc)	Democratic	105,841	57.93%	Tom Reynolds	Rep.	76,666	41.96%	182,701	29,175

=== Wisconsin Senate (2002, 2006) ===
Year	Election	Date	Elected				Defeated				Total	Plurality
2002	Primary	Sep. 10	Tom Reynolds	Republican	5,673	53.73%	Peggy Rosenzweig (inc)	Rep.	4,882	46.24%	10,559	791
2002	General	Nov. 5	Tom Reynolds	Republican	31,693	52.85%	George L. Christenson	Dem.	28,021	46.73%	59,970	3,672
2006	General	Nov. 7	Jim Sullivan	Democratic	31,693	51.68%	Tom Reynolds (inc)	Rep.	33,686	48.16%	69,943	2,462

Wisconsin Senate
Preceded by Peggy Rosenzweig	Member of the Wisconsin Senate from the 5th district January 6, 2003 – January 1, 2007	Succeeded by Jim Sullivan
