= Michael Ellis (American politician) =

American politician (1941–2018)

Michael G. Ellis

Member of the Wisconsin Senate from the 19th district
- In office January 3, 1983 – January 3, 2015
- Preceded by: Gary Goyke
- Succeeded by: Roger Roth
Senate positions
President of the Wisconsin Senate
In office January 8, 2013 – January 3, 2015
Preceded by	Fred Risser
Succeeded by	Mary Lazich
In office January 3, 2011 – July 17, 2012
Preceded by	Fred Risser
Succeeded by	Fred Risser
Majority Leader of the Wisconsin Senate
In office April 21, 1998 – January 4, 1999
Preceded by	Charles Chvala
Succeeded by	Charles Chvala
In office April 20, 1993 – June 13, 1996
Preceded by	David Helbach
Succeeded by	Charles Chvala
Minority Leader of the Wisconsin Senate
In office January 4, 1999 – January 25, 2000
Preceded by	Charles Chvala
Succeeded by	Mary Panzer
In office June 13, 1996 – April 21, 1998
Preceded by	Charles Chvala
Succeeded by	Charles Chvala
In office January 2, 1989 – April 20, 1993
Preceded by	Susan Engeleiter
Succeeded by	David Helbach

Member of the Wisconsin State Assembly
- In office January 1, 1973 – January 3, 1983
- Preceded by: District established
- Succeeded by: Steven C. Brist
- Constituency: 55th Assembly district
- In office January 4, 1971 – January 1, 1973
- Preceded by: David O. Martin
- Succeeded by: District abolished
- Constituency: Winnebago 3rd district

Personal details
- Born: February 21, 1941 Neenah, Wisconsin, U.S.
- Died: July 20, 2018 (aged 77) Neenah, Wisconsin, U.S.
- Party: Republican
- Spouse: Sandra Lou Schmallenberg (m. 1971–2018)
- Education: University of Wisconsin–Oshkosh (B.S.)
- Profession: Farmer, teacher, politician

Michael Gary Ellis (February 21, 1941 – July 20, 2018) was an American farmer and Republican politician from Neenah, Wisconsin. He served 44 years in the Wisconsin Legislature, including 12 years in the Wisconsin State Assembly (1971–1983) and 32 years in the Wisconsin Senate (1983–2015). He was Republican floor leader in the Senate from 1989 to 2000, and was President of the Wisconsin Senate for most of the 2011–2012 term and all of the 2013–2014 term.

== Early life and education ==
Michael G. Ellis was born and raised in and around Neenah, Wisconsin. He attended St. Patrick's Catholic Grade School, in neighboring Menasha, Wisconsin, and graduated from Neenah High School. He went on to attend the University of Wisconsin–Oshkosh, where he earned his bachelor's degree in secondary education in 1965. After graduation, he became a teacher at St. Mary's High School, where he taught history and politics.

== Early political career ==
He first entered public office in 1969, when he was elected to the Neenah City Council. The next year, the incumbent state representative for that area, David O. Martin, announced he would run for Lieutenant Governor of Wisconsin rather than seek another term in the Assembly. Ellis entered the race as a Republican, and didn't face opposition in the Republican primary. He went on to defeat Democratic newcomer, pastor Kenneth Walstrom, in the general election.

During his first term in the Assembly, Ellis and his wife bought a large farm estate, where they established a horse ranch, known as Ellis Quarter Horses. Within a few years Ellis retired from teaching and he resigned from the Neenah City Council in 1975.

In the 1970 election, Ellis had been elected in what was then the Winnebago County 3rd district, comprising roughly the northeast corner of the county. During the 1971 legislative term, the Wisconsin Legislature enacted a major redistricting act. Under the new district plan, Ellis resided in the 55th Assembly district, which still contained most of the city of Neenah but had shed the neighboring town of Neenah. He easily won re-election in the new district in 1972, but faced a serious challenge in 1974, when the Republican Party faced national backlash from the Watergate scandal. That year, Ellis faced Menasha school teacher Greg Weyenberg, who charged that Ellis had been neglecting his legislative duties. Ellis narrowly prevailed in the general election, receiving just 50.9% of the vote. Weyenberg made another attempt in 1976, but Ellis increased his margin, receiving 54.9% of the vote. Ellis easily won a fifth term in 1978, receiving 69% of the vote over 23-year old challenger Kathleen Anderson. He faced no opponent in 1980.

== Wisconsin Senate ==
During the 1981–1982 legislative term, Wisconsin's redistricting was gridlocked by divided government and was ultimately carried out by a court-order from a panel of federal judges, resulting in a significant reconfiguration of Senate districts. Under the new district plan, Ellis decided to challenge incumbent Democratic state senator Gary Goyke, who had represented the 19th Senate district for eight years. Goyke had been significantly hobbled by the court's redistricting plan, as most of his native city of Oshkosh, Wisconsin—representing about a third of all the votes in the old Senate district—had been removed from the district and replaced with a substantial portion of the city of Appleton. Goyke's own home had been part of the city moved into a new Senate district, but Goyke chose to relocate in order to remain in the 19th district with the other two thirds of his constituents. Ellis announced his run for state senate shortly after the court published its remedial maps on June 9, 1982; Goyke announced his move later that month, setting up the race between the two long-time incumbents.

Goyke and Ellis had personally clashed during the legislature's attempt at redistricting earlier that year, as Goyke expected to keep most of Oshkosh and add a small portion of Appleton to the district, but Ellis resisted that plan because it would result in dividing his native city of Neenah into two Assembly districts. They had also been in competition during that legislative term over who would take credit for bill to support the Fox River lock system. After a hotly contested race, Ellis prevailed with 52.4% of the vote.

Despite Ellis' victory, the 1982 election resulted in the Democratic Party gaining full control of state government, and they went on to pass a new redistricting act in 1983, resulting in another major reconfiguration of Ellis' district. The 19th Senate district was redrawn to remove more of the remaining parts of Oshkosh and stretching the district through rural western Winnebago County and into western Fond du Lac County. Under the new district plan, Ellis easily won re-election in 1986 and 1990, receiving 76% of the vote in 1986 and 64% in 1990. During the 1980s, Ellis leapt into leadership in the Senate Republican caucus, becoming assistant minority leader in 1985, and then minority leader in 1989.

Another court-ordered redistricting occurred in 1992, and the 19th Senate district shifted again, shedding areas of Fond du Lac County and southern Winnebago County, and adding areas of southwest Outagamie County. Ellis won two more lopsided re-election victories in 1994 and 1998 under this map configuration. During the 1990s, the Republicans briefly gained the Senate majority, making Ellis majority leader from April 1993, when Republicans gained the majority by winning two special elections, until June 1996, when Democrats regained the majority after winning a recall election. Republicans briefly regained the majority in April 1998, after another special election. Ellis served as leader throughout these years. He stepped down from leadership in January 2000 to explore a bid for the 2002 gubernatorial election. Ellis ultimately did not enter the 2002 gubernatorial race.

Also in 2002, another court-ordered redistricting occurred, but this one had little impact on the 19th Senate district. Ellis faced no opposition in the three elections held under this map, in 2002, 2006, and 2010.

The 2010 election saw Republicans gain full control of state government for the first time since 1998. At the start of the 2011–2012 legislative term, Ellis, who was then the longest-serving Republican member of the state Senate, was chosen as Senate president. With full control of government, however, Republicans quickly ran into major controversy with the infamous "budget-repair bill" which stripped public employees of collective bargaining power. The bill launched weeks of protests at the Wisconsin State Capitol, and ultimately resulted in recall elections against the Governor and 13 state senators. The recalls ultimately resulted in Democrats flipping control of the Senate, and Ellis relinquished the office of president to Democrat Fred Risser in July 2012. Before those recalls, however, Republicans managed to pass a new redistricting act which became infamous as one of the most aggressive and successful gerrymanders in the country. Under that map, Republicans easily regained their state senate majority in 2012, and Ellis was restored as Senate President at the start of the 2013–2014 term.

=== 2014 video scandal ===
It initially seemed like Ellis would run for a ninth term in the Senate in 2014. But his reputation took a severe hit in April 2014, when a recording was released in which Ellis was heard on tape scheming with allies to set up an illegal outside political action committee to launch attacks against his likely 2014 opponent, Penny Bernard Schaber. In the days after the tape's release, Ellis announced that he would not run again in 2014. The tape was particularly shocking because Ellis had been an outspoken critic of dark money PACs and their growing influence in the political process. It was later revealed that the leaked tape was the work of right wing activist group Project Veritas, and the project was paid for by the far right Club for Growth, whose Wisconsin branch had been a recent nemesis of Ellis over his stance on PACs.

Ellis left office at the end of his term, in January 2015, and largely retired from public life. He died in his sleep, at his home in Neenah on July 20, 2018, at age 77.

== Personal life and family ==
Michael G. Ellis was one of six children born to Howard and Marie (née Gruper) Ellis.

He married Sandra Lou "Sandy" Schmallenberg on July 17, 1971, at Emanuel Lutheran Church, in New London, Wisconsin. A separate ceremony was held at Ellis' St. Mary Catholic Church in Menasha. Sandy continues to maintain their horse ranch, at Ellis Quarter Horses.

== Electoral history ==
=== Wisconsin Assembly, Winnebago 3rd district (1970) ===
Year	Election	Date	Elected				Defeated				Total	Plurality
1970	General	Nov. 3	Michael G. Ellis	Republican	7,305	61.79%	Kenneth Walstrom	Dem.	4,517	38.21%	11,822	2,788

=== Wisconsin Assembly, 55th district (1972–1980) ===
Year	Election	Date	Elected				Defeated				Total	Plurality
1972	General	Nov. 7	Michael G. Ellis	Republican	10,893	67.85%	Elmer R. Enz	Dem.	4,918	30.63%	16,055	5,975
1972	General	Nov. 7	Michael G. Ellis	Republican	10,893	67.85%	David J. Champeau	Amer.	244	1.52%	16,055	5,975
1974	General	Nov. 5	Michael G. Ellis (inc)	Republican	5,930	50.87%	Gregory P. Weyenberg	Dem.	5,728	49.13%	11,658	202
1976	General	Nov. 2	Michael G. Ellis (inc)	Republican	10,652	54.85%	Gregory P. Weyenberg	Dem.	8,770	45.15%	19,422	1,882
1978	General	Nov. 7	Michael G. Ellis (inc)	Republican	9,958	69.22%	Kathleen M. Anderson	Dem.	4,428	30.78%	14,386	5,530
1980	General	Nov. 4	Michael G. Ellis (inc)	Republican	15,161	100.0%	--unopposed--				15,161	15,161

=== Wisconsin Senate (1980–2010) ===
Year	Election	Date	Elected				Defeated				Total	Plurality
1982	General	Nov. 2	Michael G. Ellis	Republican	26,080	52.39%	Gary Goyke (inc)	Dem.	23,701	47.61%	49,781	2,379
1986	General	Nov. 4	Michael G. Ellis (inc)	Republican	34,805	76.41%	Forrest Weber	Dem.	10,744	23.59%	45,549	24,061
1990	General	Nov. 6	Michael G. Ellis (inc)	Republican	28,751	63.82%	Carol Moczygemba	Dem.	16,297	36.18%	45,048	12,454
1994	General	Nov. 8	Michael G. Ellis (inc)	Republican	34,256	75.52%	Andrew J. Smith	Dem.	11,104	24.48%	45,360	23,152
1998	General	Nov. 3	Michael G. Ellis (inc)	Republican	36,130	70.50%	Michael L. Meyer	Dem.	15,121	29.50%	51,251	21,009
2002	General	Nov. 5	Michael G. Ellis (inc)	Republican	40,737	99.23%	--unopposed--				41,054	40,420
2006	General	Nov. 7	Michael G. Ellis (inc)	Republican	51,162	98.66%	--unopposed--				51,857	50,467
2010	General	Nov. 2	Michael G. Ellis (inc)	Republican	49,179	99.04%	--unopposed--				49,655	48,703

Wisconsin State Assembly
Preceded by David O. Martin	Member of the Wisconsin State Assembly from the Winnebago 3rd district January 4, 1971 – January 1, 1973	District abolished
District established by 1971 Wis. Act 304	Member of the Wisconsin State Assembly from the 55th district January 1, 1973 – January 3, 1983	Succeeded by Steven C. Brist
Wisconsin Senate
Preceded by Gary Goyke	Member of the Wisconsin Senate from the 19th district January 3, 1983 – January 3, 2015	Succeeded by Roger Roth
Preceded by Susan Engeleiter	Minority Leader of the Wisconsin Senate; January 2, 1989 – April 20, 1993	Succeeded by David Helbach
Preceded by David Helbach	Majority Leader of the Wisconsin Senate; April 20, 1993 – June 13, 1996	Succeeded by Charles Chvala
Preceded by Charles Chvala	Minority Leader of the Wisconsin Senate; June 13, 1996 – April 21, 1998	Succeeded by Charles Chvala
Preceded by Charles Chvala	Majority Leader of the Wisconsin Senate; April 21, 1998 – January 4, 1999	Succeeded by Charles Chvala
Preceded by Charles Chvala	Minority Leader of the Wisconsin Senate; January 4, 1999 – January 25, 2000	Succeeded by Mary Panzer
Preceded by Fred Risser	President of the Wisconsin Senate; January 3, 2011 – July 17, 2012	Succeeded by Fred Risser
Preceded by Fred Risser	President of the Wisconsin Senate; January 8, 2013 – January 3, 2015	Succeeded by Mary Lazich
