= Brian Burke (American politician) =

American politician (born 1958)

Member of the Wisconsin Senate from the 3rd district
- In office November 15, 1988 – January 3, 2003
- Preceded by: John Norquist
- Succeeded by: Tim Carpenter

Personal details
- Born: April 19, 1958 (age 68) Milwaukee, Wisconsin, U.S.
- Party: Democratic
- Spouse: Patricia Coorough
- Education: Marquette University; Georgetown University Law Center
- Profession: Lawyer

Brian Burke (born April 19, 1958) is an American lawyer and former politician from Milwaukee, Wisconsin. He served 14 years as a Democratic member of the Wisconsin Senate, representing the west and south sides of the city of Milwaukee as well as the village of West Milwaukee from November 1988 to January 2003. His political career was ended by the early 2000s "caucus scandal" in which he was one of a bipartisan group of Wisconsin lawmakers charged with inappropriately utilizing state employees for political activity; Burke ultimately took a plea deal for utilizing his Senate office staff for work on his 2002 campaign for attorney general of Wisconsin.

Before being elected to the state Senate, Burke served as a member of the Milwaukee Common Council, and as an assistant district attorney. Since leaving politics, Burke has worked as a state public defender in Milwaukee.

== Biography ==
Brian Burke was born and raised in Milwaukee, Wisconsin; he graduated from Milwaukee's Washington High School in 1975, then earned his bachelor's degree from Marquette University in 1978. He received his Juris Doctor degree in 1981 from Georgetown University Law Center.

In 1984, he was elected to the Milwaukee Common Council. From 1988 until 2003, Burke served in the Wisconsin State Senate.

Burke now works in the Milwaukee office of the Wisconsin State Public Defender as an assistant state public defender.
