= Electoral history of the Tea Party movement =

Elections featuring American movement

The Tea Party Movement, founded in 2009, is an American political movement that advocates strict adherence to the United States Constitution, reduced U.S. government spending, taxes, reducing the U.S. national debt and the federal budget deficit.

In the 2010 midterm elections, The New York Times identified 138 candidates for Congress with significant Tea Party support and reported that all of them were running as Republicans. According to a calculation on an NBC blog, 50% of the candidates backed by a Tea Party group, or who identified themselves as Tea Party members, were elected to the Senate, while 31% were elected to the House. In addition, research by economists Andreas Madestam of Stockholm University, Daniel Shoag and David Yanagizawa-Drott of Harvard University, and Stan Veuger of the American Enterprise Institute estimated that the Tea Party movement protests generated 2.7–5.5 million additional votes nationwide for the Republican Party in the 2010 House elections.

== Founding of Tea Party movement ==
On February 19, 2009, in a broadcast from the floor of the Chicago Mercantile Exchange, CNBC Business News Network editor Rick Santelli loudly criticized the government plan to refinance mortgages as "promoting bad behavior" by "subsidizing losers' mortgages", and raised the possibility of putting together a "Chicago Tea Party in July". A number of the traders and brokers around him cheered on his proposal, to the apparent amusement of the hosts in the studio. It was called "the rant heard around the world". Santelli's remarks "set the fuse to the modern anti-Obama Tea Party movement", according to journalist Lee Fang.

The following day after Santelli's comments from the Chicago Mercantile Exchange, 50 national conservative leaders, including Michael Johns, Amy Kremer, and Jenny Beth Martin, participated in a conference call that gave birth to the national Tea Party movement. In response to Santelli, websites such as ChicagoTeaParty.com, registered in August 2008 by Chicago radio producer Zack Christenson, were live within twelve hours. About 10 hours after Santelli's remarks, reTeaParty.com was bought to coordinate Tea Parties scheduled for the 4th of July and within two weeks was reported to be receiving 11,000 visitors a day. However, many scholars are reluctant to label Santelli's remarks the "spark" of the Tea Party considering that a "Tea Party" protest had taken place 3 days before in Seattle, Washington. This had led many opponents of the Tea Party to define this movement as "astroturfed," but it seems as if Santelli's comments did not "fall on deaf ears" considering that, "the top 50 counties in foreclosure rates played host to over 910 Tea Party protests, about one-sixth of the total"

== 2010 election ==
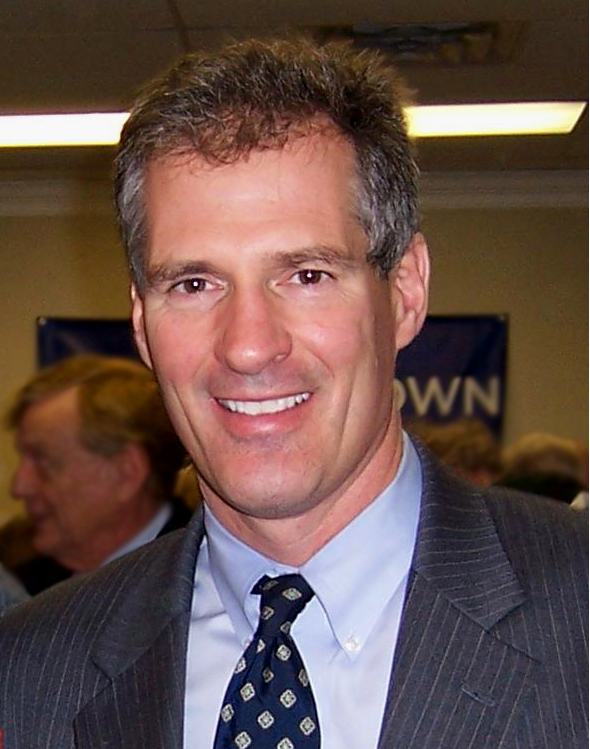
Scott Brown on the campaign trail

In the 2010 midterm elections, The New York Times identified 138 candidates for Congress with significant Tea Party support and reported that all of them were running as Republicans—of whom 129 were running for the House and 9 for the Senate. The Wall Street Journal – NBC News poll in mid-October showed 35% of likely voters were Tea-party supporters, and they favored the Republicans by 84% to 10%. The first Tea Party candidate to be elected into office is believed to be Dean Murray, a Long Island businessman, who won a special election for a New York State Assembly seat in February 2010.

According to a calculation on an NBC blog, 32% of the candidates who were backed by the Tea Party, or identified themselves as a Tea Party member, won the election. In the primaries for Colorado, Nevada, and Delaware the Tea Party-backed Senate Republican nominees defeated "establishment" Republicans who had been expected to win their respective Senate races, but went on to lose in the general election to their Democratic opponents. The three Senate nominees were seen by many in America and the media as either too inexperienced or had positions that were viewed as too extreme to be electable. Several of the Tea Party-endorsed candidates won victories against established Republicans in primaries, such as Alaska, Colorado, Delaware, Florida, Nevada, New York, South Carolina, and Utah.

- Republican Scott Brown, who received Tea Party support, was elected as the U.S. senator from Massachusetts, normally a solidly pro-Democratic state.
- L. Dean Murray, a Long Island businessman, won a special election for a New York State Assembly seat. He is believed to be the first Tea Party activist to be elected into office.
- In Utah attorney Mike Lee defeated establishment Republican U.S. Senator Bob Bennett (R-Utah) in the GOP senate primary on May 8, 2010. Lee's win is seen as a victory for the Tea Party Movement, whose supporters were against Bennett's return.
- Rand Paul, who gave a speech at the first tea party event held in December 2007 and who was subsequently endorsed by other Tea Party groups, won the Super Tuesday GOP Senate primary in Kentucky. Paul, the son of Republican Congressman Ron Paul of Texas, comfortably beat Republican establishment favourite Secretary of State of Kentucky Trey Grayson with 60% of the vote, and subsequently won in the November general election. He was quoted saying, "The Tea Party Movement is about saving our country from a mountain of debt."
- In the South Carolina's 1st congressional district GOP Primary, Tea Party favourite State Rep. Tim Scott defeated two establishment Republicans with long family histories in Republican politics: Paul Thurmond, son of the former South Carolina U.S. Senator Strom Thurmond. and Carroll Campbell, son of former South Carolina Governor Carroll A. Campbell, Jr. Scott has spent one term in the South Carolina House, where the businessman became the first African American GOP representative in more than 100 years.
- Nikki Haley, a 38-year-old Indian-American state representative, beat out three prominent Republican rivals in the South Carolina primary race for governor, capturing 49% of the vote. She defeated the second-place finisher, U.S. Representative Gresham Barrett, in a run-off election on June 22.
- In California, Chuck DeVore, who had Tea Party backing, lost the GOP senate primary to Carly Fiorina, who had backing from Sarah Palin. But she lost on November 2, 2010, to Barbara Boxer.
- In Nevada, State Assemblywoman Sharron Angle won the U.S. Senate Republican primary race, defeating the GOP favourite and one-time front runner, State Sen. Sue Lowden. Angle was defeated by Senate Majority Leader Harry Reid.
- In Alaska, attorney Joe Miller defeated current U.S. Senator Lisa Murkowski, in the GOP primary race on August 24, 2010. Murkowski had been appointed to the seat by her father, Alaska Governor Frank Murkowski, who had held the Senate seat for 30 years prior to becoming governor. Murkowski remained in the election as a write-in candidate, eventually beating Miller in the general election.
- In Delaware, Tea Party-backed candidate Christine O'Donnell defeated veteran U.S. Representative Mike Castle in the Republican primary for U.S. Senate. Her victory was a surprising upset and was seen as a sign of Tea Party movement strength, even though Castle and not O'Donnell was the Republican expected to easily win the seat. O'Donnell lost the election.
- In New York, Tea Party-backed candidate Carl Paladino defeated former Representative Rick Lazio in the Republican primary for governor; in the November election he was defeated by Democrat Andrew Cuomo.
- In Florida, Tea Party favourite Speaker of the Florida House of Representatives Marco Rubio defeated Independent and sitting governor Charlie Crist for the U.S. Senate seat.
- In Colorado, Tea Party favourite Ken Buck won the GOP Senate primary, defeating Republican establishment candidate Lieutenant Governor of Colorado Jane Norton, which caused controversy especially over Buck's stance on abortion. In the November general election, Buck was defeated by Senator Michael Bennet.

There were allegations of Democratic candidates planting "fake" Tea Party candidates in Florida, Michigan, New Jersey, and Pennsylvania.

== 2012 election ==
For the 2012 election, four of the 16 Tea Party candidates won a seat in the Senate, and Tea Party Caucus founder Michele Bachmann was re-elected to the House. The media, such as ABC and Bloomberg, commented that Tea Party candidates had less success in 2012 than in 2010.

In February 2011, the Tea Party Patriots organized and hosted the American Policy Summit in Phoenix, Arizona. The 1,600 attendees were polled regarding their preference for a 2012 presidential candidate. Herman Cain, the first of the 2012 candidates to form a presidential exploratory committee, won the poll with 22%. Runners-up were Tim Pawlenty (16%), Ron Paul (15%) and Sarah Palin (10%). Ron Paul won the Summit's online poll.

In September 2011, CNN and Tea Party Express co-hosted a Republican primary debate among presidential candidates that featured questions from various Tea Party groups.

- In March 2012, incumbent Rep. Jean Schmidt was defeated in the primary for Ohio's 2nd congressional district by tea-party backed Brad Wenstrup, an Iraq Veteran and podiatrist. Wenstrup went on to win the general election.
- Also in March 2012, Tea Party backed incumbent Rep. Don Manzullo was defeated in the primary election for the new Illinois's 16th congressional district by first-term incumbent and former tea-party favourite Rep. Adam Kinzinger.
- In April 2012, Sen. Orrin Hatch, seeking renomination, received less than 60% of the vote of the Utah state Republican convention, forcing a primary election. Hatch defeated the Tea Party candidate Dan Liljenquist securing 57.25% of the vote compared to Liljenquist's 28.28%.
- In May 2012, Tea Party favourite Indiana State Treasurer Richard Mourdock defeated long-serving Sen. Richard Lugar in the Indiana Senate GOP primary with a 20% margin of victory. After making controversial comments about rape, Mourdock lost to Democratic challenger Rep. Joe Donnelly.
- With an endorsement from Sarah Palin and the help of the Tea Party, Nebraska's State Sen. Deb Fischer pulled off an upset victory in the 2012 Republican primary for the Senate. Her Republican opponents, Attorney General of Nebraska Jon Bruning, and State Treasurer Don Stenberg, each spent well in excess of $1 million, where as Fischer spent $100,000, augmented by twice that much in SuperPAC spending from Chicago Cubs part-owner Joe Ricketts. Fischer then defeated Democratic challenger former Sen. Bob Kerrey in a landslide in the November election.
- Tea Party candidate for Senate Ted Cruz got enough of the primary vote in Texas to force a run-off vote against establishment GOP candidate Lieutenant Governor of Texas David Dewhurst in May 2012. Cruz defeated Dewhurst in the runoff election with a 14% margin of victory. Cruz defeated Democratic challenger Paul Sadler, 57 percent to 41 percent.
- The "grass-roots activists who identify to a large extent with the leaderless tea party movement" played a part in Scott Walker's election to Governor of Wisconsin in 2010 as well as his recall election victory in 2012. A FOX News exit poll showed Tea Party support was a key part of Walker's win in 2012, just as it was in 2010.
- In Atlanta, the Tea Party partnered with the NAACP and the Sierra Club to defeat the $7.2 billion Transportation Investment Act in June 2012. The act had the support of both Democratic and Republican "establishment" politicians. The act was supported with $8 million used to sell the project to the public, while the Tea Party had only $15,000.00 to oppose it. With concerns that much of the act would do little to improve Atlanta's transportation problems, it was defeated with a 63% "no" vote.
- In Pennsylvania, Tea Party activists and FreedomWorks pushed for a law that would allow businesses to provide student tuition grants for school-choice in return for tax credits. The law was signed by Gov. Tom Corbett on June 30.
- In Missouri, tea party supporter U.S. Representative Todd Akin won a three-way contest to become the GOP nominee to challenge incumbent Senator Claire McCaskill in the fall. One of Akin's main rivals was another tea party candidate, State Treasurer of Missouri Sarah Steelman, whose backers included the Tea Party Express and Sarah Palin. Akin caused controversy with his legitimate rape remarks. Akin subsequently lost the election to McCaskill.
- In August, presumed Republican presidential nominee Mitt Romney selected Rep. Paul Ryan of Wisconsin as his vice-presidential running mate. The move was praised by the Tea Party Express, the Tea Party Patriots, Sarah Palin, as well as many other Tea Party groups. Romney lost the general election to Barack Obama by 3.85% (approximately five million votes) in an electoral college landslide.
- In Wisconsin, establishment Republican and former governor Tommy Thompson won that state's GOP Senate primary, defeating Eric Hovde and former U.S. Rep. Mark Neumann, in August. Hovde, who finished second, had the backing of Freedomworks. Neumann, who finished third, had the backing of the Tea Party Express, the Club for Growth, and Sen. Jim DeMint Thompson was defeated by Democrat Tammy Baldwin in the general election.
- In Florida, former veterinarian and Tea Party supporter Ted Yoho defeated 12-term GOP Rep. Cliff Stearns in the GOP primary in August Yoho easily defeated Democrat J.R. Gaillot, 64.8 percent to 32.4 percent in the general election.
- Also in Florida, Tea Party favorite Allen West lost to Democratic challenger Patrick Murphy. After demanding a recount, West finally conceded the election to Murphy on November 20, 2012.
- In Illinois, Tea Party Representative Joe Walsh lost to Democrat Lt. Colonel Tammy Duckworth, a 20-year veteran of the military who earned a Purple Heart, an Air Medal and an Army Commendation Medal after losing both of her legs in 2004, when her helicopter was hit by a rocket-propelled grenade in Iraq.
- In Indiana, Tea Party politician U.S. Representative Mike Pence was elected Governor and provided with Republican super majorities in both the state's House and Senate.

== 2014 election ==
The Washington Post said in July 2012 that the Tea Party "is no longer the rising tsunami it appeared to be in 2010. Largely gone are the disorderly rallies, colonial-era costumes, and fixations on fringe issues, such as the provenance of the president's birth certificate. Instead, the movement has retooled into a loosely organized network of field operations that, as in Texas, pushes Republicans toward more strident conservative positions and candidates, while supplying ground troops across the country for candidates and big-money conservative groups, such as the Club for Growth and Americans for Prosperity."

in 2012, Tea Party members mailed literature, ran phone banks, knocked on doors, and drove thousands of miles to build support for legislation. The Tea Party Patriots offered free online training programs. The Tea Party partnered with seemingly unlikely groups, such as the NAACP and the Sierra Club.

In the 2014 elections in Texas, the Tea Party made large gains, with numerous Tea Party favorites being elected into office, like Dan Patrick as lieutenant governor, Ken Paxton as attorney general, in addition to numerous other candidates.

== 2015 elections ==
In the 2015 Kentucky gubernatorial election, Matt Bevin, a Tea Party favourite who challenged Mitch McConnell in the Republican primary in the 2014 Kentucky Senate election, won with over 52% of the vote, despite fears that he was too extreme for the state. Bevin is the second Republican in 44 years to be Governor of Kentucky. However, four years later, Bevin went on to lose against Andy Beshear, in what was considered an upset.

== 2016 presidential election ==
The 2016 Republican presidential primary featured three U.S. Senators, Ted Cruz, Rand Paul, and Marco Rubio, whose elections to the U.S. Senate were broadly attributed to Tea Party movement support. The ultimate winner of the Republican presidential primary, Donald Trump, praised the U.S. Tea Party movement throughout his 2016 campaign. In August 2015, Trump told a Tea Party gathering in Nashville that "The Tea Party people are incredible people. These are people who work hard and love the country and they get beat up all the time by the media." In a January 2016 CNN poll at the beginning of the 2016 Republican primary, Trump led all Republican candidates modestly among self-identified Tea Party voters with 37 percent supporting Trump and 34 percent supporting Ted Cruz.

== Ground game and Get Out The Vote (GOTV) efforts ==
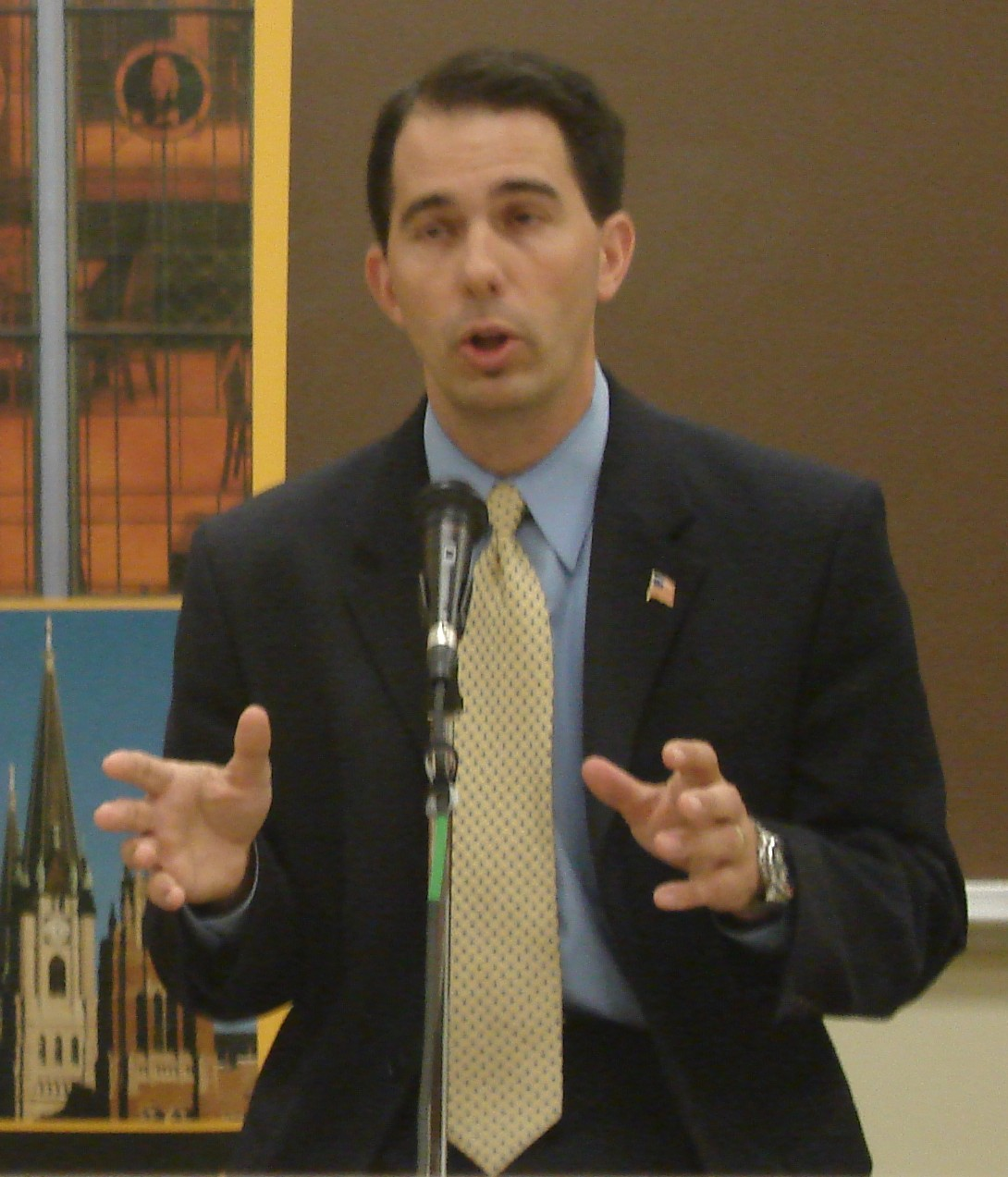
Scott Walker at Marquette University conference, 2007

=== Tea Party ground game/GOTV before 2012 ===
Tea Party activists nationwide made a mass pilgrimage to the Bay State to support Scott Brown's unlikely campaign and ultimate win over Democrat Martha Coakley. Democrats have said as late as September 2010 that the Tea Party could not match their ground game and was mostly hype. The Democrats have the advantage of better organization, an older volunteer organization, and personal connections between volunteers and voters.

On November 2, 2010, Fox News reported that the Democrats did not dispute expectations that they would lose the House and that their vaunted campaign operation faced a less polished ground game infused with the energy of the new Tea Party. The Tea Party helped deliver to Democrats what President Obama called a "shellacking" in the mid-term elections. On November 10, 2010, FreedomWorks announced the national rollout of "FreedomConnect", which they touted as a "grassroots action center that will revolutionize the ways in which FreedomWorks members, 9/12ers, and Tea Party groups across the country communicate and organize in 2011 and beyond".

=== Challenge of the ground game for the Tea Party in the 2012 election cycle ===
The ground game was considered to be a major challenge for Tea Party candidates in several important contests in 2012, including Wisconsin's recall election of Gov. Scott Walker and the Texas GOP Senate primary race between "establishment" candidate Lt. Gov. David Dewhurst and Tea Party favorite Ted Cruz.

Early in the election cycle, Democratic allies had expressed confidence in the strength of their own ground game. In September 2011, Teamsters President Jimmy Hoffa delivering a speech to introduce President Obama to the gathered crowd, said "We got to keep an eye on the battle that we face: The war on workers. And you see it everywhere, it is the Tea Party... We're going to win that war... President Obama, this is your army... We are ready to march. Let's take these sons of bitches out and give America back to an America where we belong." Similarly, Organized Labor in Wisconsin hoped its ground game would give it the edge. According to Karl Rove, Democratic Party Chair Debbie Wasserman Schultz also boasted on CNN in May that the Wisconsin recall would be the "dry run we need of our massive, significant dynamic grass-roots presidential campaign".

When challenging GOP "establishment" opponents, the Tea Party faced opposing ground games of various sizes and sophistication. In Texas, Lt. Gov. David Dewhurst hired "ground game expert" Kevin Lindley, who had run Gov. Rick Perry's campaigns, while in Indiana Richard Lugar no longer lived in the state and developed a reputation for being out of touch with voters there.
