= Rodney C. Moen =

American politician (born 1937)

Rodney C. Moen (born July 26, 1937) is an American former member of the Wisconsin State Senate.

== Biography ==
Rodney C. Moen was born on July 26, 1937, in Whitehall, Wisconsin. He attended the Rochester Institute of Technology, Syracuse University, University of Southern California and Ball State University. Moen was an officer in the United States Navy for more than twenty years, including a tour of duty in the Vietnam War. He is married and has had five children.

== Political career ==
Moen was a member of the Senate from 1983 to 2003 as a member of the Democratic Party. He served three terms as Assistant Majority Leader, two terms as Minority Caucus Chairperson and a term as Majority Caucus Chairperson.
