= Barbara Lorman =

American politician

Barbara Lorman (born 31 July 1932) is a former member of the Wisconsin State Senate.

== Biography ==
Lorman was born on July 31, 1932, in Madison, Wisconsin. She graduated from Madison West High School before attending the University of Wisconsin-Madison and the University of Wisconsin-Whitewater. Lorman is married with three children and has been an active participant with Rotary International and the Boy Scouts of America.

== Career ==
Lorman was self-described as a "former homemaker" and president of a metals recycling company when she was elected to the Senate in a special election in 1980, with 7,453 votes, to 5,562 for Democrat Janice Redford. She was assigned to the standing committee on energy, and to the Migrant Labor Council.

She was the first female senator to win re-election.

She continued to be a member until 1994, when she was defeated in a three-way Republican primary election by Scott L. Fitzgerald, with 6,098 votes for Fitzgerald, 5,613 for Herbert Feil and 5,494 votes for Lorman.

Wisconsin Senate
Preceded by Peter D. Bear	Member of the Wisconsin Senate from the 13th district 1980–1995	Succeeded by Scott L. Fitzgerald
