= Ron Brown (Wisconsin politician) =

American politician (born 1946)

Ron Brown (born September 18, 1946) is an American Republican politician from Wisconsin.

== Background ==
Born in Marion, Indiana, Brown received an associate degree from Purdue Extension-Fort Wayne. He served in the United States Air Force from 1964 to 1967. Then, Brown worked in the fire departments in Fort Wayne, Indiana and Eau Claire, Wisconsin serving as the fire chief. He also was a business owner. Brown served in the Wisconsin State Senate from 2003 to 2007 and was defeated for reelection in 2006.
