= Scott Fitzgerald (politician) =

American politician (born 1963)

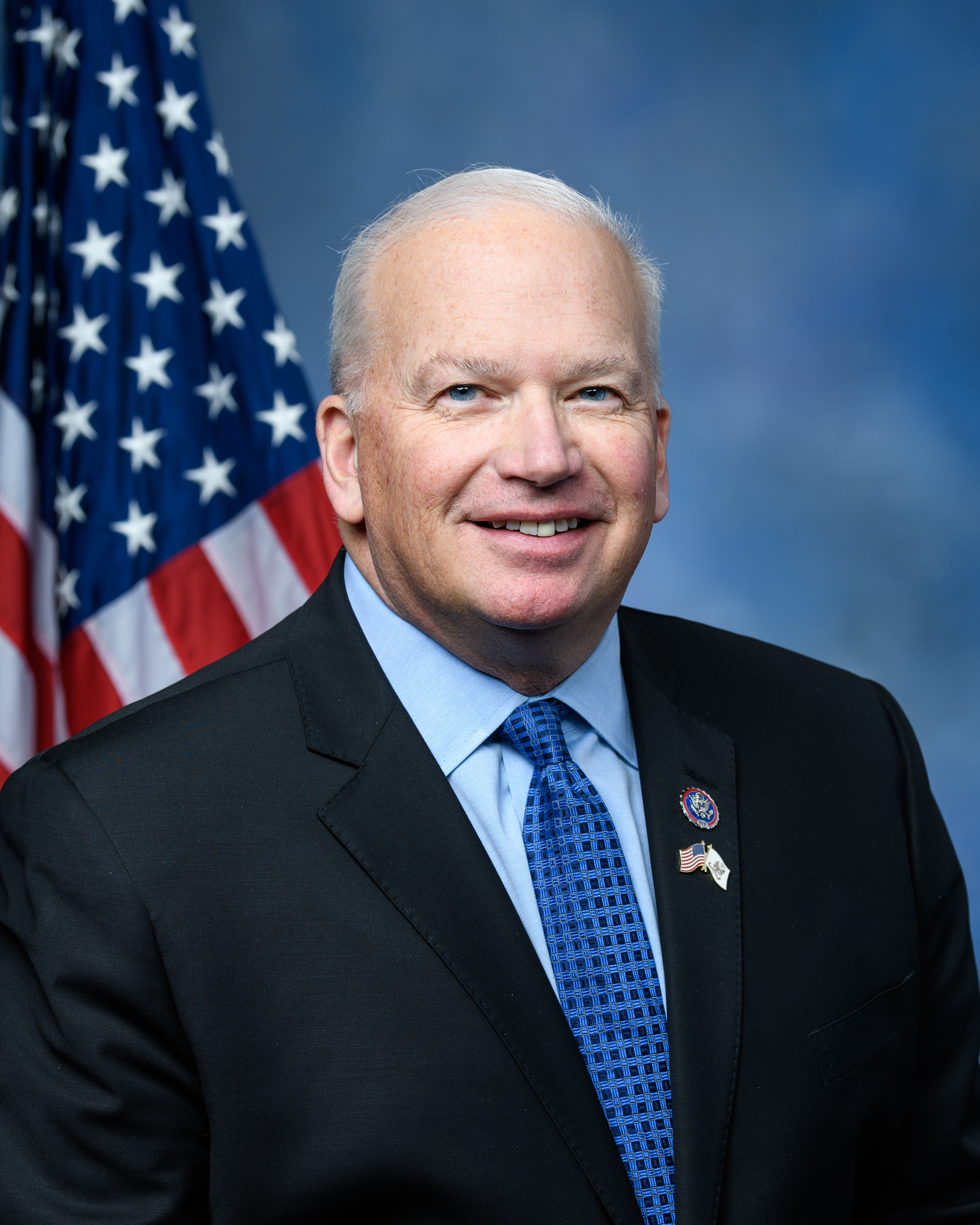
- Official portrait, 2021

Member of the U.S. House of Representatives from Wisconsin's 5th district
- Incumbent
- Assumed office January 3, 2021
- Preceded by: Jim Sensenbrenner

Majority Leader of the Wisconsin Senate
- In office January 7, 2013 – January 1, 2021
- Preceded by: Mark F. Miller
- Succeeded by: Devin LeMahieu
- In office January 3, 2011 – March 17, 2012
- Preceded by: Dave Hansen
- Succeeded by: Mark F. Miller

Minority Leader of the Wisconsin Senate
- In office July 17, 2012 – January 7, 2013
- Preceded by: Mark F. Miller
- Succeeded by: Chris Larson

Member of the Wisconsin Senate from the 13th district
- In office January 3, 1995 – January 1, 2021
- Preceded by: Barbara Lorman
- Succeeded by: John Jagler

Personal details
- Born: Scott Lawrence Fitzgerald; November 16, 1963 (age 62) Chicago, Illinois, U.S.
- Party: Republican
- Spouse: Lisa Fitzgerald
- Children: 3
- Education: University of Wisconsin, Oshkosh (BS)
- Website: House website Campaign website

Military service
- Branch/service: United States Army; U.S. Army Reserve
- Years of service: 1981–2009
- Rank: Lieutenant Colonel
- Unit: Armor Branch

Scott Lawrence Fitzgerald (born November 16, 1963) is an American politician and former newspaper publisher. A Republican, he represents Wisconsin's 5th congressional district in the U.S. House of Representatives. The district includes many of Milwaukee's northern and western suburbs, such as Waukesha, West Bend, Brookfield, and Mequon. He represented the 13th district in the Wisconsin State Senate from 1995 to 2021.

== Early life, education and career ==
Fitzgerald was born in Chicago on November 16, 1963, and moved with his family to Hustisford, Wisconsin, at age 11. He graduated from Hustisford High School in 1981, and earned his Bachelor of Science from the University of Wisconsin–Oshkosh in 1985. He joined the U.S. Army Reserve in 1981 and was commissioned as a lieutenant in the Armor Branch in 1985. He completed the United States Army Command and General Staff College and served in a number of assignments during his 27 years of service, including battalion commander. In 2009, he retired at the rank of lieutenant colonel. He worked for nearly a decade as a newspaper publisher, purchasing the Dodge County Independent News in Juneau, Wisconsin, in 1990, and selling it in 1996 to the Watertown Daily Times, where he remained as associate publisher for several years.

== Wisconsin Senate ==
Fitzgerald was a member of the Wisconsin State Senate in 2004

Fitzgerald was elected to the Wisconsin Senate in 1994, when he unseated Republican incumbent Barbara Lorman in a three-way Republican primary election, with 6,098 votes for Fitzgerald, 5,613 for Herbert Feil and 5,494 votes for Lorman. He was reelected six times, serving until he joined Congress in 2021. His Republican colleagues elected him majority leader for the 2011–12 legislative session, and he served as leader of the chamber's Republicans for the rest of his time in the legislature. In prior sessions, Fitzgerald served as minority leader, co-chair of the Joint Committee on Finance, and chair of the Senate Corrections Committee. His constituency included much of the Beaver Dam micropolitan statistical area and parts of the Madison and Milwaukee metropolitan areas, stretching across most of Dodge County and parts of Columbia, Dane, Jefferson, Washington, and Waukesha Counties.

=== 2011 Wisconsin protests ===
In 2011, public employees protested Governor Scott Walker's budget repair bill. In January 2011, Fitzgerald said he wanted to meet with the unions before changing the laws, adding, "We're not going to walk through hell and go through that if the governor doesn't offer that up."

On February 8, 2011, the Walker administration appointed Fitzgerald's father to head the state patrol. Three days later, Walker introduced his budget repair bill, which limited collective bargaining from most public workers, but not law enforcement officers such as state patrol. Fitzgerald and all but one Republican in the State Senate supported Walker's bill.

=== Gerrymandering ===
In 2011, Wisconsin Republicans drew the state's legislative map with 99 Assembly and 33 Senate districts. In 2016, a three-judge panel ruled this map an "unconstitutional gerrymander". In response, Fitzgerald and Wisconsin Republicans hired attorney Paul Clement to fight this ruling before the Supreme Court. As of 2016, the state had spent over $2 million to defend the legislative maps.

=== Limiting powers of the Evers administration ===
After the 2018 elections, in which Democrats were elected governor, attorney general and secretary of state in Wisconsin, Fitzgerald pushed for legislation to take select powers away from the incoming administration. The legislation would also reduce the time allowed for early voting in Wisconsin election. Courts struck down a similar law that curbed early voting in 2016, ruling that the law "intentionally discriminates on the basis of race" and that it was "stifling votes for partisan gain." The bill would also prevent the incoming administration from withdrawing from a lawsuit seeking to repeal the Affordable Care Act (Obamacare) by taking the power to do so away from the governor and giving it to the legislature. Fitzgerald described concern over the stripping of power as "manufactured outrage by the Democrats". He justified the attempt to curb the incoming administration's powers, saying, "state legislators are the closest to those we represent" and suggesting that urban voters (who are more likely to vote for Democrats) do not reflect the real electorate.

=== COVID-19 pandemic ===
In April 2020, during the COVID-19 pandemic, Fitzgerald opposed calls by Governor Tony Evers to delay an election from early April to late May, to make it an entirely mail-in election, and to mail ballots to all registered voters. Due to the pandemic, it was estimated that many voters would be effectively disenfranchised, and in-person voting was also considered a public health risk. According to the Milwaukee Journal Sentinel, Fitzgerald "had no answer to how local election officials are supposed to keep people safe as a massive shortage of poll workers has resulted in the closure or reduction of polling locations, forcing more people to vote at a single site."

Due to Wisconsin legislature's slowness to waive a requirement that unemployed Wisconsites wait a week before they can be reimbursed unemployment benefits, Wisconsin lost $25 million in federal funding from the federal CARES Act. Fitzgerald and Assembly speaker Robin Vos were warned that this would happen unless they passed the waiver.

Amid the pandemic, Fitzgerald said he opposed a statewide face mask mandate. He supported a lawsuit against Evers for implementing a face mask mandate. The state legislature could have convened a session to strike down Evers's mandate, but Republicans opted to let the courts strike down the mandate so as to prevent vulnerable Republican legislators from having to vote against face mask mandates just before an election.

== U.S. House of Representatives ==
Fitzgerald during a meeting with Taiwan President Lai Ching-te in April 2026

=== Elections ===
==== 2020 ====
In September 2019, Fitzgerald announced he would run for Wisconsin's 5th congressional district. The announcement came two weeks after 21-term incumbent Jim Sensenbrenner announced his retirement. Fitzgerald's state senate district was largely coextensive with the congressional district's eastern portion. He did not have to give up his state senate seat to run for Congress; state senators serve staggered four-year terms, and Fitzgerald was not up for reelection until 2022.

It was initially thought that the Republican primary–the real contest in what has long been the most Republican district in Wisconsin–would attract a crowded field, but Republicans quickly cleared the field for Fitzgerald; according to the Cook Political Report, he was the only substantive candidate in the field when nominations closed. He won the primary with 77% of the vote.

In October 2020, Fitzgerald's campaign was penalized for accepting excessive campaign contributions but did not pay the $3,600 settlement. According to the Wisconsin State Journal, the penalty was paid by the Committee to Elect a Republican Senate.

=== Tenure ===
Fitzgerald was among the 120 members of the United States House of Representatives, all Republicans, to object to counting Arizona's and Pennsylvania's electoral votes in the 2020 presidential election. Representative Tom Tiffany also objected.

Fitzgerald voted to provide Israel with support following the October 7 attacks.

In 2022, FItzgerald voted no on the Women's Health Protection Act, which would've codified the right to abortion if it had become a law.

=== Committee assignments ===
- Committee on the Judiciary
- Committee on Education and Labor
- Committee on Small Business

=== Caucus memberships ===
- Republican Study Committee
- Congressional Western Caucus

== Personal life ==
Fitzgerald's father, Stephen "Steve" Fitzgerald, was Sheriff of Dodge County, Wisconsin, for 14 years and served as the U.S. marshal for the Western District of Wisconsin. Walker later appointed him head of the Wisconsin State Patrol.

Fitzgerald's younger brother, Jeff, represented the 39th Assembly District, covering the northeastern portion of Scott's state senate district. In Wisconsin, state senate districts are formed by combining three neighboring state assembly districts. Jeff was Assembly Speaker during the 2011–12 legislative session.

Fitzgerald and his wife, Lisa, have three sons. He is Roman Catholic.

Wisconsin Senate
Preceded by Russ Decker	Majority Leader of the Wisconsin Senate; 2011–2012	Succeeded by Mark F. Miller
Preceded by Mark F. Miller	Minority Leader of the Wisconsin Senate; 2012–2013	Succeeded by Chris Larson
Preceded by Mark F. Miller	Majority Leader of the Wisconsin Senate; 2013–2021	Succeeded by Devin LeMahieu
U.S. House of Representatives
Preceded by Jim Sensenbrenner	Member of the U.S. House of Representatives from Wisconsin's 5th congressional district 2021–present	Incumbent
U.S. order of precedence (ceremonial)
Preceded by Michelle Fischbach	United States representatives by seniority 250th	Succeeded by Scott Franklin
