= 2012 Wisconsin elections =

- April 3, 2012; November 6, 2012

The 2012 Wisconsin elections was held in the U.S. state of Wisconsin in 2012. The fall general election occurred on November 6, 2012. One of Wisconsin's U.S. Senate seats and all of Wisconsin's eight seats in the United States House of Representatives were up for election, as well as sixteen seats in the Wisconsin State Senate and all 99 seats in the Wisconsin State Assembly. Voters also chose ten electors to represent them in the Electoral College, which then participated in selecting the president of the United States. The 2012 Fall Partisan Primary was held on August 14, 2012. In the presidential election, Wisconsin congressman Paul Ryan was the Republican nominee for Vice President of the United States.

2012 also saw the culmination of the recall effort in Wisconsin which had been incited by Governor Scott Walker's 2011 Wisconsin Act 10, which stripped public employee unions of collective bargaining rights. During 2012, Walker faced a recall election along with four Republican state senators. These recall elections were all held on June 5, 2012, with a special primary on May 8. Walker survived the gubernatorial recall, but Democrats gained control of the state Senate.

In the Fall general election, the Democratic presidential candidate, incumbent president Barack Obama, won Wisconsin's ten electoral votes and secured a second four-year term. U.S. Senator Herb Kohl retired and was succeeded by fellow Democrat Tammy Baldwin; there was no change to the partisan makeup of Wisconsin's congressional delegation, remaining at five Republicans and three Democrats. This was also the first legislative election after a dramatic Republican gerrymander was implemented in 2011; Republicans gained two seats in the Wisconsin Senate, regaining the majority, and maintained their majority in the Wisconsin State Assembly.

The 2012 Wisconsin Spring Election was held April 3, 2012. This election featured a not-yet-settled Republican party presidential nominating contest, and various judicial and local elections, including county executive and mayoral elections in Wisconsin's largest city and county, Milwaukee. The 2012 Wisconsin Spring Primary was held February 21, 2012.

== Federal offices ==
=== President ===
Incumbent president Barack Obama sought a second four-year term. In Wisconsin, voters elected Obama's electoral slate. Obama went on to win the majority of the electoral college.

==== Democratic primary ====
In the 2012 Democratic Party presidential primaries, the Wisconsin Democratic presidential preference primary was held concurrent with the Spring general election, April 3, 2012. The only candidate for the Democratic nomination was incumbent president Barack Obama, who received about 98% of the vote.

==== Republican primary ====
In the 2012 Republican Party presidential primaries, the Wisconsin Republican presidential preference primary was held concurrent with the Spring general election, April 3, 2012. As the incumbent president was a Democrat, the Republican presidential nominating contest was open and saw nine candidates enter the race. By the time of Wisconsin's presidential preference primary, only four candidates remained in the race, former Massachusetts governor Mitt Romney, former U.S. senator Rick Santorum (PA), former Speaker of the House of Representatives Newt Gingrich (GA), and U.S. Representative Ron Paul (TX). Other candidates whose names appeared on the ballot included former Ambassador Jon Huntsman Jr. (UT) and U.S. Representative Michele Bachmann (MN).

Mitt Romney won the Wisconsin Republican presidential preference primary with 44%, Santorum received 37% of the votes, Paul received 11%, with 6% going to Gingrich.

==== General election ====
Barack Obama won the presidential election against Mitt Romney and was awarded Wisconsin's ten electoral votes.

United States presidential election in Wisconsin, 2012
| Party | Candidate | Votes | % | ±% |
|---|---|---|---|---|
| Democratic | Barack Obama (incumbent) / Joe Biden (incumbent) | 1,620,985 | 52.83% | −3.39pp |
| Republican | Mitt Romney / Paul Ryan | 1,407,966 | 45.89% | +3.57pp |
| Libertarian | Gary Johnson / Jim Gray | 20,439 | 0.67% | +0.37pp |
| Independent | Jill Stein / Ben Manski | 7,665 | 0.25% | |
| Constitution | Virgil Goode / Jim Clymer | 4,930 | 0.16% | |
| Independent | Jerry White / Phyllis Scherrer | 553 | 0.02% | |
| Independent | Gloria La Riva / Filberto Ramirez Jr. | 526 | 0.02% | |
| Independent | Rocky Anderson (write-in) / Luis J. Rodriguez (write-in) | 112 | 0.00% | |
| Independent | Roseanne Barr (write-in) / Cindy Sheehan (write-in) | 88 | 0.00% | |
| Write-in | | 5,170 | 0.17% | -0.05pp |
| Plurality | | 213,019 | 6.94% | -6.96pp |
| Total votes | | 3,068,434 | 100.0% | +2.85% |
| Democratic hold | | | | |

=== U.S. Senate ===
A regularly scheduled election was held for Wisconsin's Class 1 U.S. Senate seat at the Fall general election, November 6, 2012. The incumbent, Herb Kohl, first elected in 1988, retired after 24 years in the U.S. Senate. The election was won by Democrat Tammy Baldwin, who had previously served 14 years in the U.S. House of Representatives. Baldwin received 51% of the vote and defeated former Wisconsin governor Tommy Thompson in the general election. With her election, Baldwin became the first openly gay member of the U.S. Senate and Wisconsin's first female U.S. senator.

=== U.S. House ===
All 8 of Wisconsin's congressional districts were up for election at the Fall general election, November 6, 2012. Seven of the eight incumbent representatives ran for reelection, with Tammy Baldwin vacating District 2 to run for U.S. Senate. Party composition remained unchanged after the general election.

| District | | Incumbent | | | This race | |
| Num. | PVI | Representative | | First elected | Results | Candidates |
|---|---|---|---|---|---|---|
| Wisconsin 1 | R+3 | Paul Ryan | Republican | 1998 | Incumbent re-elected. | ▌ ✓ Paul Ryan (Rep.) 54.9%; ▌Rob Zerban (Dem.) 43.4%; ▌Keith Deschler (Ind.) 1.7% |
| Wisconsin 2 | D+16 | Tammy Baldwin | Democratic | 1998 | Incumbent retired to run for U.S. senator. New member elected. Democratic hold. | ▌ ✓ Mark Pocan (Dem.) 68.0%; ▌Chad Lee (Rep.) 32.0%; ▌Joe Kopsick (Ind.) |
| Wisconsin 3 | D+6 | Ron Kind | Democratic | 1996 | Incumbent re-elected. | ▌ ✓ Ron Kind (Dem.) 64.1%; ▌Ray Boland (Rep.) 35.9% |
| Wisconsin 4 | D+21 | Gwen Moore | Democratic | 2004 | Incumbent re-elected. | ▌ ✓ Gwen Moore (Dem.) 72.3%; ▌Dan Sebring (Rep.) 23.8%; ▌Robert R. Raymond (Ind.) 2.8% |
| Wisconsin 5 | R+12 | Jim Sensenbrenner | Republican | 1978 | Incumbent re-elected. | ▌ ✓ Jim Sensenbrenner (Rep.) 67.9%; ▌Dave Heaster (Dem.) 32.1% |
| Wisconsin 6 | R+5 | Tom Petri | Republican | 1979 (Special) | Incumbent re-elected. | ▌ ✓ Tom Petri (Rep.) 62.1%; ▌Joe Kallas (Dem.) 37.9% |
| Wisconsin 7 | EVEN | Sean Duffy | Republican | 2010 | Incumbent re-elected. | ▌ ✓ Sean Duffy (Rep.) 56.1%; ▌Pat Kreitlow (Dem.) 43.9%; ▌Dale Lehner (Ind.) |
| Wisconsin 8 | R+2 | Reid Ribble | Republican | 2010 | Incumbent re-elected. | ▌ ✓ Reid Ribble (Rep.) 55.9%; ▌Jamie Wall (Dem.) 44.1% |

== State offices ==
=== Executive ===
==== Gubernatorial recall ====
Wisconsin governor Scott Walker was subject to a recall petition in the Spring of 2012 and faced a recall election on June 5, 2012. He survived the recall election; Walker received 53% of the vote in a rematch with his 2010 opponent, Milwaukee mayor Tom Barrett.

Wisconsin Gubernatorial Recall Election, 2012
| Party | Candidate | Votes | % | ±% |
|---|---|---|---|---|
| Republican | Scott Walker (incumbent) | 1,335,585 | 53.08% | +0.79pp |
| Democratic | Tom Barrett | 1,164,480 | 46.28% | −0.24pp |
| Independent | Hariprasad Trivedi | 14,463 | 0.57% | |
| Write-in | | 1,537 | 0.06% | +0.06pp |
| Total votes | | 2,516,065 | 100.00% | |
| Republican hold | | | | |

==== Lieutenant gubernatorial recall ====
Alongside Walker, lieutenant governor Rebecca Kleefisch was subject to recall petitions in the Spring of 2012 and faced recall elections on June 5, 2012. She survived the recall election; Kleefisch defeated Fire Fighters union president Mahlon Mitchell with a slightly smaller margin than Walker had in defeating Barrett.

Wisconsin Lieutenant Gubernatorial Recall Election, 2012
| Party | Candidate | Votes | % | ±% |
|---|---|---|---|---|
| Republican | Rebecca Kleefisch (incumbent) | 1,301,739 | 52.9% | |
| Democratic | Mahlon Mitchell | 1,156,520 | 47.1% | |
| Total votes | | 2,458,259 | 100.0 | |
| Republican hold | | | | |

=== Legislative ===
==== State Senate recall ====
Four Wisconsin state senators were subjects of a coordinated recall effort to remove them from office in the Spring of 2012. The four recall elections occurred on June 5, 2012. One incumbent, Van H. Wanggaard, was defeated in the recall. One other chose to resign and was replaced by another of the same party. The net result was that Democrats gained the majority of the state Senate.

| Dist. | Incumbent | | | This race | |
| Dist. | Member | Party | First elected | Result | General |
|---|---|---|---|---|---|
| 13 | Scott L. Fitzgerald | Republican | 1994 | Incumbent retained | ✓ Scott Fitzgerald (Rep.) 58.4%; Lori Compas (Dem.) 40.7% |
| 21 | Van H. Wanggaard | Republican | 2010 | Incumbent recalled. Democratic gain. | ✓ John Lehman (Dem.) 50.6%; Van Wanggaard (Rep.) 49.4% |
| 23 | Terry Moulton | Republican | 2010 | Incumbent retained | ✓ Terry Moulton (Rep.) 56.7%; Kristen Dexter (Dem.) 43.3% |
| 29 | Vacant (Incumbent resigned) | | | New member elected. Republican hold | ✓ Jerry Petrowski (Rep.) 61.4%; Donna J. Seidel (Dem.) 38.6% |

==== State Senate 33rd district special election ====
A special election was held December 2, 2012, to fill the 33rd State Senate seat vacated by Rich Zipperer, who resigned to become deputy chief of staff to Governor Scott Walker. Republican state representative Paul Farrow won the seat without opposition.

==== State Senate ====
The 16 even-numbered districts out of 33 seats in the Wisconsin Senate were up for election at the Fall general election, November 6, 2012. Ten of these seats were held by Democrats and six were held by Republicans. Prior to the election, Democrats controlled the chamber with a 17 to 16 majority. Republicans flipped two seats in the general election, taking an 18–15 majority going into the 101st Wisconsin Legislature.

| Dist. | Incumbent | | | This race | | |
| Dist. | Member | Party | First elected | Primary election candidates | General election candidates | Result |
|---|---|---|---|---|---|---|
| 2 | Robert Cowles | Republican | 1987 (special) | Robert Cowles (Rep.) | ✓ Robert Cowles (Rep.) 98.54% | Incumbent re-elected. |
| 4 | Lena Taylor | Democratic | 2004 | Lena Taylor (Dem.) | ✓ Lena Taylor (Dem.) 86.62%; David D. King (Ind.) 13.11% | Incumbent re-elected. |
| 6 | Spencer Coggs | Democratic | 2003 (special) | Nikiya Harris (Dem.); Michael Mayo (Dem.); Allyn Monroe Swan (Dem.); Elizabeth M. Coggs (Dem.); Delta L. Triplett (Dem.) | ✓ Nikiya Harris (Dem.) 98.72% | Incumbent retired. Democratic hold. |
| 8 | Alberta Darling | Republican | 1992 | Alberta Darling (Rep.) | ✓ Alberta Darling (Rep.) 95.58%; Beth L. Lueck (Dem. write-in) | Incumbent re-elected. |
| 10 | Sheila Harsdorf | Republican | 2000 | Sheila Harsdorf (Rep.); Daniel C. Olson (Dem.) | ✓ Sheila Harsdorf (Rep.) 59.17%; Daniel C. Olson (Dem.) 40.72% | Incumbent re-elected. |
| 12 | Jim Holperin | Democratic | 2008 | Tom Tiffany (Rep.); Susan Sommer (Dem.); Lisa Theo (Dem.) | ✓ Tom Tiffany (Rep.) 56.24%; Susan Sommer (Dem.) 40.45%; Paul O. Ehlers (Ind.) 3.26% | Incumbent retired. New member elected. Republican gain. |
| 14 | Luther Olsen | Republican | 2004 | Luther Olsen (Rep.); David Wayne Eiler (Rep.); Margarete Worthington (Dem.) | ✓ Luther Olsen (Rep.) 57.53%; Margarete Worthington (Dem.) 42.4% | Incumbent re-elected. |
| 16 | Mark F. Miller | Democratic | 2004 | Mark F. Miller (Dem.) | ✓ Mark F. Miller (Dem.) 98.73% | Incumbent re-elected. |
| 18 | Jessica King | Democratic | 2011 (recall) | Rick Gudex (Rep.); Jessica King (Dem.) | ✓ Rick Gudex (Rep.) 50.3%; Jessica King (Dem.) 49.6% | Incumbent lost. New member elected. Republican gain. |
| 20 | Glenn Grothman | Republican | 2004 | Glenn Grothman (Rep.); Tanya Lohr (Dem.) | ✓ Glenn Grothman (Rep.) 68.63%; Tanya Lohr (Dem.) 31.3% | Incumbent re-elected. |
| 22 | Robert Wirch | Democratic | 1996 | Robert Wirch (Dem.); Pam Stevens (Rep.) | ✓ Robert Wirch (Dem.) 69.57%; Pam Stevens (Rep.) 30.29% | Incumbent re-elected. |
| 24 | Julie Lassa | Democratic | 2003 (special) | Julie Lassa (Dem.); Scott Kenneth Noble (Rep.); Steve Abrahamson (Rep.) | ✓ Julie Lassa (Dem.) 56.59%; Scott Kenneth Noble (Rep.) 43.31% | Incumbent re-elected. |
| 26 | Fred Risser | Democratic | 1962 | Fred Risser (Dem.) | ✓ Fred Risser (Dem.) | Incumbent re-elected. |
| 28 | Mary Lazich | Republican | 1998 | Mary Lazich (Rep.); Jim Ward (Dem.) | ✓ Mary Lazich (Rep.) 63.38%; Jim Ward (Dem.) 36.51% | Incumbent re-elected. |
| 30 | Dave Hansen | Democratic | 2000 | Dave Hansen (Dem.); John Macco (Rep.); Ray Suennen (Rep.) | ✓ Dave Hansen (Dem.) 54.23%; John Macco (Rep.) 45.68% | Incumbent re-elected. |
| 32 | Jennifer Shilling | Democratic | 2011 (recall) | Jennifer Shilling (Dem.); Bill Feehan (Rep.) | ✓ Jennifer Shilling (Dem.) 58.28%; Bill Feehan (Rep.) 41.64% | Incumbent re-elected. |

==== State Assembly ====
All 99 seats of the Wisconsin State Assembly were up for election at the Fall general election, November 6, 2012. This was the first election after the redistricting of the legislature in 2011, and 21 seats had no incumbent on the ballot in this election. Republicans won 60 seats, matching their total from the 2010 election and maintaining their majority going into the 101st Wisconsin Legislature.

| Seats | | Party (majority caucus shading) | | | Total |
| Seats | | Democratic | Ind. | Republican | Total |
|---|---|---|---|---|---|
| Last election (2010) | | 38 | 1 | 60 | 99 |
| Total before this election | | 38 | 1 | 58 | 97 |
| Up for election | | 39 | 1 | 59 | 99 |
| of which: | Incumbent retiring | 8 | 1 | 6 | 15 |
| of which: | Vacated | 1 | 0 | 1 | 2 |
| of which: | Unopposed | 16 | 0 | 4 | 20 |
| This election | | 39 | 0 | 60 | 99 |
| Change from last election | | ▲1 | ▼1 | Steady | |
| Total after this election | | 39 | 0 | 60 | 99 |
| Change in total | | ▲1 | ▼1 | ▲2 | |

=== Judicial ===
==== State Court of Appeals ====
Four seats on the Wisconsin Court of Appeals were on the ballot at the Spring general election, April 3, 2012. None of the elections were contested, one new judge was elected.

- In District I, incumbent judge Ralph Adam Fine was elected to a fifth six-year term, running unopposed. He was first elected in 1988.
- In District II, incumbent chief judge Richard S. Brown was elected to a sixth six-year term, running unopposed. He was first elected in 1978 (to a four-year term).
- In District III, incumbent judge Mark Mangerson, appointed by Governor Scott Walker in 2011, was elected to his first six-year term, running unopposed.
- In District IV, assistant state attorney general JoAnne Kloppenburg was elected to a six-year term, running unopposed, to succeed retiring judge Margaret J. Vergeront.

==== State Circuit Courts ====
Fifty two of the state's 249 circuit court seats were on the ballot at the Spring general election, April 3, 2012. Twelve of those elections were contested, two incumbents were defeated.

== Local offices ==
=== Clark County ===
==== Clark County district attorney ====
A regularly scheduled district attorney election was held in Clark County, Wisconsin, concurrent with the Fall general election, November 6, 2012. The incumbent, Darwin Zweig, retired after serving 32 years in the office. The Democratic candidate, Clark County corporation counsel Lyndsey Boon Brunette, was elected district attorney, defeating attorney Shari Post.

=== Kenosha County ===
==== Kenosha mayor ====
A regularly scheduled mayoral election was held in Kenosha, Wisconsin, at the Spring general election, April 3, 2012. The incumbent Keith Bosman, first elected in 2008, was elected to a second four-year term, defeating city council president Jesse Downing. Two other candidates were eliminated in the February primary: video producer Jeff Baas and bar owner Nasser Museitif.

=== Marathon County ===
==== Wausau mayor ====
A regularly scheduled mayoral election was held in Wausau, Wisconsin, at the Spring general election, April 3, 2012. The incumbent Jim Tipple, first elected in 2004, was elected to a third four-year term.

=== Milwaukee County ===
==== Milwaukee mayor ====
A regularly scheduled mayoral election was held in Milwaukee, Wisconsin, at the Spring general election, April 3, 2012. The incumbent Tom Barrett, first elected in 2004, was elected to a third four-year term, defeating University of Wisconsin faculty member Edward McDonald. One other candidate was eliminated in the February primary, Ieshuh Griffin.

==== Milwaukee County executive ====
A regularly scheduled county executive election was held in Milwaukee County, Wisconsin, at the Spring general election, April 3, 2012. The incumbent Chris Abele, first elected in a 2011 special election, was elected to his first four-year term without opposition.

=== Outagamie County ===
==== Appleton mayor ====
A regularly scheduled mayoral election was held in Appleton, Wisconsin, at the Spring general election, April 3, 2012. The incumbent Tim Hanna, first elected in 1996, was elected to a fifth four-year term, defeating city councilmember Thomas Konetzke.

=== Sheboygan County ===
==== Sheboygan mayor recall ====
A mayoral recall election was held in Sheboygan, Wisconsin, concurrent with the Spring primary, February 21, 2012. A special recall primary was held on January 17, 2012. After incumbent mayor Bob Ryan ran into a series of controversies, Sheboygan residents collected over 4,700 signatures to trigger a recall election, submitting their petitions on November 1, 2011. In the recall election, Ryan was defeated by former state representative Terry Van Akkeren in a rematch of the 2009 mayoral election. Six other candidates ran and were eliminated in the nonpartisan primary: city councilmember Jean Kittelson, retired executive Roberta Filicky-Peneski, businessman Randy Schwoerer, musician Erik Neave, high school student Asher Heimermann, and restaurant worker Mark Hermann.
