= Moulton (surname) =

Moulton is a surname. Notable people with the surname include:

- Alex Moulton (1920–2012), British engineer and inventor of vehicle suspension systems and bicycles
- Charles Moulton (disambiguation), multiple people
- Dave Moulton (1936–2025), British custom bicycle frame maker
- David Moulton (1871–1951), American lawyer and conservationist
- Forest Ray Moulton, American astronomer
- Hugh Moulton (1876–1962), British Liberal Party politician, Member of Parliament
- James Egan Moulton, first headmaster of Newington College, Australia, Methodist minister
- James Hope Moulton, English academic, Methodist minister
- John Coney Moulton, British military officer, entomologist and museum director
- John Egan Moulton (1930–2012), Australian medical practitioner, Chairman of the NSW Institute of Sports Medicine and team doctor of the Australian national rugby union team
- John Fletcher Moulton (1844–1941), English barrister, judge and Member of Parliament
- Jon Moulton (born 1950), British venture capitalist
- Jonathan Moulton, American general
- Kamari Moulton (born 2005), American football player
- Louise Chandler Moulton (1835-1908), American poet, story-writer, critic
- Powers Moulton (1829–1904), American politician in Wisconsin
- Ron Moulton (1924-2010), English author and editor
- Sara Moulton, American celebrity chef
- Seth Moulton, U.S. House member and former United States Marine Corps officer
- Stephanie Moulton Sarkis, American psychotherapist and author
- Stephen Moulton (1794–1880), British industrialist
- Stephen Moulton (soldier), American Revolution figure
- Terry Moulton (b. 1946), American politician in Wisconsin
- Tom Moulton, American record producer
- William Fiddian Moulton (1835–1898), English Methodist minister, Biblical scholar and educator
