= 2012 Wisconsin Senate recall elections =

- June 5, 2012

4 of the 33 seats in the Wisconsin State Senate 17 seats needed for a majority
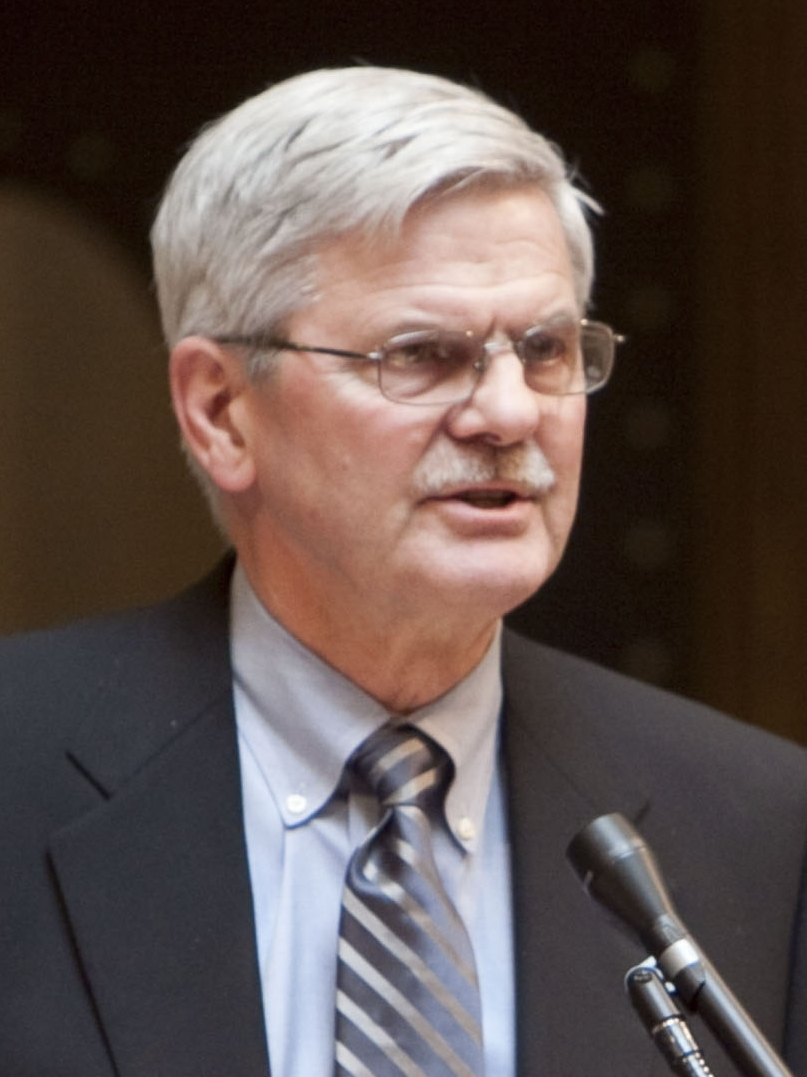

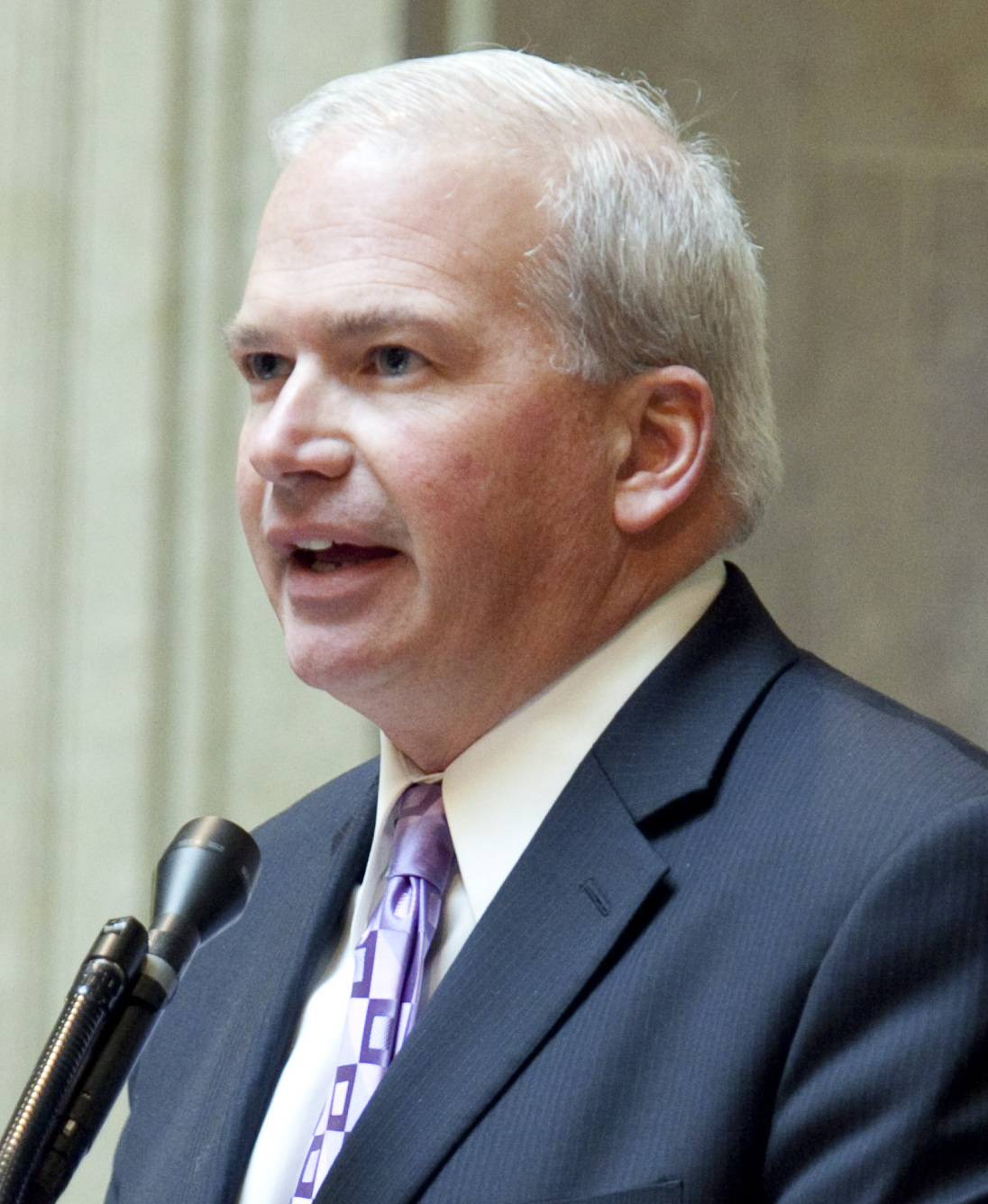
| | Majority party | Minority party |
|---|---|---|
| Leader | Mark Miller | Scott Fitzgerald |
| Party | Democratic | Republican |
| Leader since | January 12, 2011 | January 1, 2007 |
| Leader's seat | 16th–Monona | 13th–Juneau |
| Last election | 6 seats, 40.54% | 11 seats, 59.11% |
| Seats before | 16 | 17 |
| Seats won | 1 | 3 |
| Seats after | 17 | 16 |
| Seat change | ▲1 | ▼1 |
| Popular vote | 127,409 | 166,528 |
| Percentage | 43.3% | 56.7% |
- Results of the elections: Democratic gain Republican hold No election Voteshare: Democratic: 50–60% Republican: 50–60% 60–70%
President before election
Michael Ellis
Republican
Elected President
Fred Risser
Democratic

The 2012 Wisconsin Senate recall elections were a set of recall elections for four Wisconsin state senators held on June 5, 2012. Four of the 33 seats in the Wisconsin Senate were up for election—all odd-numbered districts. Before the election, four of these seats were held by Republicans. The primary election was held on May 8, 2012.

These recall elections followed the largest group of recall elections in U.S. history during the previous year, in which Republicans kept control of the Wisconsin Senate. Democrats flipped one Republican-held seat, regaining control of the chamber for the first time since 2008.

After the elections, Democrats held 17 of 33 seats for the remainder of the 100th Wisconsin Legislature, but no legislative sessions took place during this time.

== Background ==
Voters put four state senators up for recall, all Republicans, because of the budget repair bill proposed by Governor Scott Walker and circumstances surrounding it. Democrats targeted Republicans for voting to significantly limit public employee collective bargaining. Scholars could cite only four times in American history when more than one state legislator has been recalled at roughly the same time over the same issue. The recall elections occurred on June 5, with May 8 being the date of the primary election.

These recall elections followed the largest group of recall elections in U.S. history during the previous year, in which Republicans kept control of the Wisconsin Senate. In the June 5, 2012 recall elections, Democrats appeared to have taken over one seat from Republicans.

== Results summary ==
| Seats | | Party (majority caucus shading) | | Total |
| Seats | | Democratic | Republican | Total |
|---|---|---|---|---|
| Last election (2010) | | 6 | 11 | 17 |
| Total after last election (2010) | | 14 | 19 | 33 |
| Total before this election | | 16 | 17 | 33 |
| Up for election | | 0 | 4 | 4 |
| of which: | Incumbent retiring | 0 | 0 | 0 |
| of which: | Vacated | 0 | 1 | 1 |
| of which: | Unopposed | 0 | 0 | 0 |
| This election | | 1 | 3 | 4 |
| Change from last election | | ▼5 | ▼8 | |
| Total after this election | | 17 | 16 | 33 |
| Change in total | | ▲3 | ▼3 | |

=== Close races ===
Seats where the margin of victory was under 10%:

1. State Senate district 21, 1.14% (gain)

== Outgoing incumbents ==
=== Vacated office ===
- Pam Galloway, representing district 29 since 2010, resigned on March 12, 2012, to take care of her family

== Campaign ==
=== Recall petitions ===
| Dist. | Incumbent | | | Recall petition | | |
| Dist. | Member | Party | First elected | Signatures required | Signatures approved (%) | Status |
|---|---|---|---|---|---|---|
| 13 | Scott L. Fitzgerald | Rep. | 1994 | 16,742 | 18,282 (109%) | Recall held on June 5. |
| 17 | Dale Schultz | Rep. | 1991 (special) | 14,545 | TBD | Recall not held. |
| 21 | Van H. Wanggaard | Rep. | 2010 | 15,353 | 19,142 (125%) | Recall held on June 5. |
| 23 | Terry Moulton | Rep. | 2010 | 14,958 | 18,657 (125%) | Recall held on June 5. |
| 25 | Robert Jauch | Dem. | 1986 | 15,270 | TBD | Recall not held. |
| 29 | Pam Galloway | Rep. | 2010 | 15,647 | 18,511 (118%) | Recall held on June 5. |

==== District 17 ====
On March 19, 2012, paperwork was filed with the Wisconsin Government Accountability Board to create a committee to explore recalling Dale Schultz (R-Richland Center). To initiate a recall against Schultz, organizers would have had to submit 14,545 signatures to the G.A.B.. The effort was launched due to Schultz opposing a bill the week prior that would have helped Gogebic Taconite, a Florida-based mining company, set up an iron mine in northwestern Wisconsin.

==== District 25 ====
On March 19, 2012, paperwork was filed with the G.A.B. to authorize a recall petition against Robert Jauch (D-Poplar). To initiate a recall against Jauch, organizers would have had to submit at least 15,270 signatures to the G.A.B.. The effort was launched due to Jauch opposing a bill from the previous week that would have helped Gogebic Taconite set up an iron mine in northwestern Wisconsin. Proponents of the recall argued that Jauch had cost Ashland County and Iron County jobs that would have alleviated unemployment. The recall effort was ultimately suspended on May 11, with organizers redirecting their attention to supporting Scott Walker in the gubernatorial recall election.

=== 'Placeholder' candidates ===
Similarly to the previous recalls in 2011, the Republican Party backed primary challengers – known as "fake Democrats" due to being Republicans who ran in Democratic primaries – to all Democratic candidates running against Republican incumbents. The stated purpose of this was to prevent the recall elections from being held on the same day as the Democratic primary in the gubernatorial recall election and to give Republican incumbents and candidates more time to campaign.

=== Polling ===
District 13
| Poll source | Date(s) administered | Margin of error | Scott Fitzgerald (R) | Lori Compas (D) | Undecided |
|---|---|---|---|---|---|
| PPP | April 13–15, 2012 | ± 3.5% | 54% | 40% | 6% |

District 21
| Poll source | Date(s) administered | Margin of error | Van Wanggaard (R) | John Lehman (D) | Undecided |
|---|---|---|---|---|---|
| PPP | April 13–15, 2012 | ± 3.5% | 48% | 46% | 5% |

District 23
| Poll source | Date(s) administered | Margin of error | Terry Moulton (R) | Kristen Dexter (D) | Undecided |
|---|---|---|---|---|---|
| PPP | April 13–15, 2012 | ± 3.6% | 51% | 41% | 8% |

District 29
| Poll source | Date(s) administered | Margin of error | Jerry Petrowski (R) | Donna Seidel (D) | Undecided |
|---|---|---|---|---|---|
| PPP | April 13–15, 2012 | ± 3.6% | 51% | 37% | 12% |

=== Aftermath ===
Although the victory gave Democrats control of the Senate, the state legislature would not be in regular session again until after the November 2012 election when control of the legislature would again be contested. After the November 2012 election, Republicans regained control of the state Senate due to the resignation of one Democrat and two losses by Democrats to Republicans.

== Race summary ==
| Dist. | Incumbent | | | This race | |
| Dist. | Member | Party | First elected | Status | Candidates |
|---|---|---|---|---|---|
| 13 | Scott L. Fitzgerald | Republican | 1994 | Incumbent retained | ▌ ✓ Scott Fitzgerald (Rep.) 58.31%; ▌Lori Compas (Dem.) 40.70%; ▌Terry Virgil (Lib.) 0.94% |
| 21 | Van H. Wanggaard | Republican | 2010 | Incumbent recalled. New member elected. Democratic gain. | ▌ ✓ John Lehman (Dem.) 50.53%; ▌Van Wanggaard (Rep.) 49.39% |
| 23 | Terry Moulton | Republican | 2010 | Incumbent retained | ▌ ✓ Terry Moulton (Rep.) 56.57%; ▌Kristen Dexter (Dem.) 43.29% |
| 29 | --Vacant (Note: Pam Galloway (R) resigned March 16, 2012)-- | | | Previous incumbent resigned Mar. 16, 2012. New member elected. Republican hold. | ▌ ✓ Jerry Petrowski (Rep.) 61.34%; ▌Donna J. Seidel (Dem.) 38.58% |

== Detailed results ==
=== District 13 ===
Incumbent Republican Scott Fitzgerald ran for re-election. He defeated Democrat Lori Compas and Libertarian Terry Virgil in the recall election and was retained in office.

District 13 Democratic recall primary
| Party | Candidate | Votes | % |
|---|---|---|---|
| Democratic | Lori Compas | 21,257 | 71.47 |
| Democratic | Gary Ellerman | 8,213 | 27.47 |
| Write-in | | 273 | 0.92 |
| Total votes | | 29,743 | 100.0 |

District 13 recall election
| Party | Candidate | Votes | % |
|---|---|---|---|
| Republican | Scott Fitzgerald | 47,146 | 58.31 |
| Democratic | Lori Compas | 32,909 | 40.70 |
| Libertarian | Terry Virgil | 763 | 0.94 |
| Write-in | | 33 | 0.04 |
| Total votes | | 80,851 | 100.0 |

=== District 21 ===
Incumbent Republican Van H. Wanggaard ran for re-election. He was defeated by former Democratic senator John Lehman and recalled from office.

The initial results for the race were too close to call, with Lehman appearing to lead Wanggaard by less than 800 votes. The subsequent election canvas the following week confirmed Lehman's lead. Despite this, Wanggaard requested a recount, citing potential election irregularities involving potentially thousands of voters. The recount, held from June 20–July 2, decreased Lehman's margin by 15 votes. Due to the close results, several Republicans, including future Speaker of the Assembly Robin Vos, made false claims of voter fraud to explain Lehman's victory over Wanggaard. In the end, Wanggaard conceded to Lehman on July 10, 2012.

District 21 Democratic recall primary
| Party | Candidate | Votes | % |
|---|---|---|---|
| Democratic | John Lehman | 20,284 | 67.79 |
| Democratic | Tamra Varebrook | 9,513 | 31.80 |
| Write-in | | 122 | 0.41 |
| Total votes | | 29,919 | 100.0 |

District 21 recall election
| Party | Candidate | Votes | % |
|---|---|---|---|
| Democratic | John Lehman | 36,358 | 50.53 |
| Republican | Van H. Wanggaard (incumbent) | 35,539 | 49.39 |
| Write-in | | 58 | 0.08 |
| Total votes | | 71,955 | 100.0 |

=== District 23 ===
County results: Moulton—50–60% Moulton—60–70% Dexter—50–60%

Republican Terry Moulton ran for re-election. He defeated former Democratic legislator Kristen Dexter in the recall election and was retained in office.

District 23 Democratic recall primary
| Party | Candidate | Votes | % |
|---|---|---|---|
| Democratic | Kristen Dexter | 17,651 | 63.77 |
| Democratic | James Engel | 9,736 | 35.17 |
| Write-in | | 292 | 1.05 |
| Total votes | | 27,679 | 100.0 |

District 23 recall election
| Party | Candidate | Votes | % |
|---|---|---|---|
| Republican | Terry Moulton (incumbent) | 39,864 | 56.57 |
| Democratic | Kristen Dexter | 30,504 | 43.29 |
| Write-in | | 100 | 0.14 |
| Total votes | | 71,909 | 100.0 |

=== District 29 ===
Incumbent Republican Pam Galloway resigned on March 12 due to personal reasons, leaving the district open. Republican state representative Jerry Petrowski defeated Democratic legislator Donna J. Seidel and retained the seat for Republicans.

District 29 Democratic recall primary
| Party | Candidate | Votes | % |
|---|---|---|---|
| Democratic | Donna J. Seidel | 17,930 | 63.48 |
| Democratic | Jim Buckley | 10,099 | 35.75 |
| Write-in | | 217 | 0.77 |
| Total votes | | 28,246 | 100.0 |

District 29 general election
| Party | Candidate | Votes | % |
|---|---|---|---|
| Republican | Jerry Petrowski | 44,107 | 61.34 |
| Democratic | Donna J. Seidel | 27,744 | 38.58 |
| Write-in | | 58 | 0.08 |
| Total votes | | 71,909 | 100.0 |

== See also ==
- 2011 Wisconsin protests
- 2011 Wisconsin Act 10
- 2012 Wisconsin elections
  - 2012 Wisconsin gubernatorial recall election
  - 2012 Wisconsin lieutenant gubernatorial recall election
