= Multon =

Multon is a surname. Notable people with the surname include:

- Various Thomas Multons or Thomas de Multons, also spelled Moulton and Muleton
- John de Multon, Baron, 2nd Lord of Egremont
- Margaret de Moulton, Baroness, 2nd Lady of Gillesland

== See also ==
- Moulton (disambiguation)
