= Fuso =

Fuso or Fusō may refer to:

- Fusō is the Japanese pronunciation of the word Fusang (扶桑), an ancient naming for Japan.
- Japanese ironclad Fusō, an ironclad warship of the Imperial Japanese Navy that fought in the Battle of Yalu River
- Japanese battleship Fusō, lead ship of the Fusō class
  - Fusō-class battleship, a class of two battleships of the Imperial Japanese Navy that fought in World War II
- Mitsubishi Fuso Truck and Bus Corporation (MFTBC), or one of the company's brands of truck
- Mitsubishi Fuso Truck of America, Inc., a subsidiary of MFTBC
- Fusō, Aichi, a town in Japan
- A line of semi-custom bicycle frames made by Dave Moulton
- The real-world counterpart of Japan in the Strike Witches franchise, one of few countries spared from the Neuroi assault
