= Wisconsin recall effort =

Wisconsin recall effort may refer to:

- Recall elections in Wisconsin
- 2011 Wisconsin Senate recall elections
- 2012 Wisconsin Senate recall elections
- 2012 Wisconsin gubernatorial recall election
