= Molten (disambiguation) =

Molten is a word to describe an object that has melted.

Molten may also refer to:

- Molten Corporation a Japanese sports equipment and automotive parts company
- Mölten, a municipality in South Tyrol, Italy

== See also ==
- Molton (disambiguation)
- Moulton (disambiguation)
