= Kathy Bernier =

American politician (born 1956)

Member of the Wisconsin Senate from the 23rd district
- In office January 7, 2019 – January 3, 2023
- Preceded by: Terry Moulton
- Succeeded by: Jesse James

Member of the Wisconsin State Assembly from the 68th district
- In office January 3, 2011 – January 7, 2019
- Preceded by: Kristen Dexter
- Succeeded by: Jesse James

Chippewa County Clerk
- In office January 3, 1998 – February 11, 2011
- Deputy: Diane Finch; Lisa Merrell
- Preceded by: Jerome Dachel
- Succeeded by: Sandi Frion

Personal details
- Born: April 29, 1956 (age 70) Eau Claire, Wisconsin, U.S.
- Party: Republican
- Children: 3 children
- Education: University of Wisconsin-Eau Claire (BA)

Kathleen M. "Kathy" Bernier (born April 29, 1956) is an American politician in who served as a member of the Wisconsin State Senate representing the 23rd district from 2019 to 2023. She previously served as the Chippewa County Clerk from 1998 to 2011, and served as a member of the Wisconsin State Assembly for the 68th district from 2011 to 2019. In March 2018, Bernier announced that she would run to represent the 23rd district in the Wisconsin State Senate, an open seat due to the retirement of Terry Moulton. She was elected in the November election.

== Early life and education ==
Bernier was born in Eau Claire to John and Marge (Ginder) Anderson and grew up in Lake Hallie, Wisconsin. Bernier graduated from Chippewa Falls High School in 1974 and was married in September 1977. While raising her children, she worked a variety of part-time and limited term jobs including certified nursing assistant, waitress, and census taker. As a single mother, Bernier applied to the University of Wisconsin-Eau Claire in 1993. She was accepted as a non-traditional student and continued working part-time jobs to put herself through college. She graduated in May 1998 with a bachelor's degree in political science. Bernier earned a certificate in public management essentials from the University of Wisconsin-Green Bay.

Shortly after graduating, Kathy was elected Chippewa County Clerk and served in that position until February 2011. Bernier was chair of the Chippewa County Republican Party. Bernier was a trustee for the Village of Lake Hallie, as the liaison to the Clerk/Treasurer’s office, and has been on the Lake Hallie police commission and parks and recreation board.

== Wisconsin legislator ==
In 2010, Bernier defeated incumbent Democrat Kristen Dexter for the Wisconsin State Assembly 68th district in the November 2 general election. Bernier was re-elected in 2012 and 2014.

Bernier chaired the Assembly Committee on Campaigns and elections, vice-chaired the Committee on Family Law, and served on the Aging and Long-Term Care, Agriculture, Workforce Development, Tourism, and Mining and Rural Development committees. Bernier also served on the Speaker's Task Force on Alzheimer's and Dementia. She is on the National Assembly of State Legislatures and the board of the National Foundation for Women Legislators.

Bernier was elected to the Wisconsin State Senate for the 23rd district in November 2018, defeating Democrat Chris Kapsner. The seat was open due to the retirement of Terry Moulton. She did not run for reelection in 2022.

=== Legislation ===
During her time in the legislature, Bernier has authored Assembly Bill 16, a measure aimed at raising public awareness of human trafficking in Wisconsin; Senate Bill 527, a measure that increases local control for county treasurers regarding unclaimed property; Assembly Bill 112, which allows disabled individuals to seek special permission for hunting from medical practitioners; Assembly Bill 243, which adds regulations and clarity to the state Youth Hunt program; Senate Bill 160, which increases the standards of maintenance and service for nursing home facilities and oxygen equipment; Senate Bill 295, which institutes online voter registration in the state; Assembly Bill 146, which expands dental hygiene services in the state; and Assembly Bill 14, known as the State Workforce Development Bill or Wisconsin Fast Forward.

Bernier voted in support of the Budget Repair Bill (Act 10) in 2011, which requires state employees to contribute 5.8% of their salaries to cover pension costs, contribute 12.6% towards their health care premiums, and weakens collective bargaining privileges for most public employee union members.

=== Reaction to Election Probe ===
On December 13, 2021, Bernier, the chairperson of the Senate Committee on Elections, Election Process Reform and Ethics, encouraged Michael Gableman to have the GOP-sponsored probe into the 2020 election results "wrap up sooner rather than later." She said the ongoing extended investigation and repetitious questioning of the 2020 election's results only creates unwarranted doubt in the democratic process and leads to threats against state and local election officials.
