= Molton =

Molton may refer to:

== People ==
- Flora Molton (1908-1990), American singer
- Gunnar Molton, drummer for Texas Hippie Coalition

== Places ==
- South Molton, town in Devon, England
- North Molton, village, parish and former manor in north Devon, England
- Moltonville, North Carolina, unincorporated community, United States

== Other uses ==
- Molton or duvetyne, a type of twill fabric

== See also ==
- Molten (disambiguation)
- Moulton (disambiguation)
