= Thomas de Multon =

Thomas de Multon, Muleton, Moleton, or Moulton may refer to:

- Thomas Moulton (knight), died 1240), English knight and judge also recorded as Thomas de Multon
- Thomas II de Multon (died 1271), Baron of Burgh and Gilsland, the judge's son
- Thomas de Multon, 1st Baron Multon of Gilsland (1276–1313), son of Thomas, grandson and heir of the baron
- Thomas de Multon, 1st Baron Multon of Egremont (died 1322)

== See also ==
- Thomas Moulton (disambiguation)
- Multon
