= Moulton =

Moulton may refer to:

== Places in the United Kingdom ==
In England

- Moulton, Cheshire
- Moulton, Lincolnshire
  - The Moultons, civil parish
  - Moulton Chapel
  - Moulton Seas End
  - Moulton Windmill, local landmark
- Moulton St Mary, Norfolk
- Moulton, Northamptonshire
  - Moulton College, agricultural college
  - Moulton Park, industrial estate
- Moulton, Suffolk
  - Moulton Rural District, a former district of West Suffolk
  - Moulton Paddocks, racehorse training establishment
- Moulton, North Yorkshire
  - Moulton Hall, 17th-century manor house

In Wales

- Moulton, Vale of Glamorgan

== Places in the U.S. ==
- Moulton, Alabama
- Moulton, Iowa
- Moulton, Ohio
- Moulton Township, Auglaize County, Ohio
- Moulton, Texas

== Places in Antarctica ==
- Moulton Escarpment
- Mount Moulton

== Other uses ==
- William Moulton Marston
- Moulton (surname)
- Moulton Bicycle
- Moulton lunar crater
- Moulton plane, a non-desarguesian plane geometry
- Moulton (horse), a Thoroughbred racehorse

== See also ==
- Molten (disambiguation)
- Molton (disambiguation)
