= Thomas Moulton =

Thomas Moulton may refer to:

- Thomas T. Moulton (1896–1967), American sound engineer
- Tom Moulton (born 1940), American record producer
- Any figure listed at Thomas de Multon, also variously recorded as "Thomas Moulton"
