= 2012 United States House of Representatives elections in Wisconsin =

- November 6, 2012

All 8 Wisconsin seats to the United States House of Representatives
	Majority party	Minority party
Party	Republican	Democratic
Last election	5	3
Seats won	5	3
Seat change	Steady	Steady
Popular vote	1,401,995	1,445,015
Percentage	48.92%	50.42%
Swing	▼5.54%	▲6.57%

Republican
50–60%
60–70%
70–80%
Democratic
50–60%
60–70%
70–80%

The 2012 United States House of Representatives elections in Wisconsin were held on Tuesday, November 6, 2012, to elect the eight U.S. representatives from Wisconsin, one from each of the state's eight congressional districts. Representatives are elected for two-year terms; those elected served in the 113th Congress from January 2013 until January 2015. The elections coincided with the elections of other federal and state offices, including a quadrennial presidential election and an election to the U.S. Senate. Primary elections were held on August 14, 2012.

Wisconsin was one of five states in which the party that won the state's popular vote did not win a majority of seats in 2012, the other states being Arizona, Michigan, North Carolina, and Pennsylvania.

== Overview ==
United States House of Representatives elections in Wisconsin, 2012
Party	Votes	Percentage	Seats Before	Seats After	+/–
Republican	1,401,995	48.92%	5	5	-
Democratic	1,445,015	50.42%	3	3	-
Libertarian	6,054	0.20%	0	0	-
Independent	9,277	0.32%	0	0	-
Write-In	26	0.00%	0	0	-
Scattering	3,683	0.13%	0	0	-
Totals	2,956,050	100.00%	8	8	-

== District 1 ==
2012 Wisconsin's 1st congressional district election
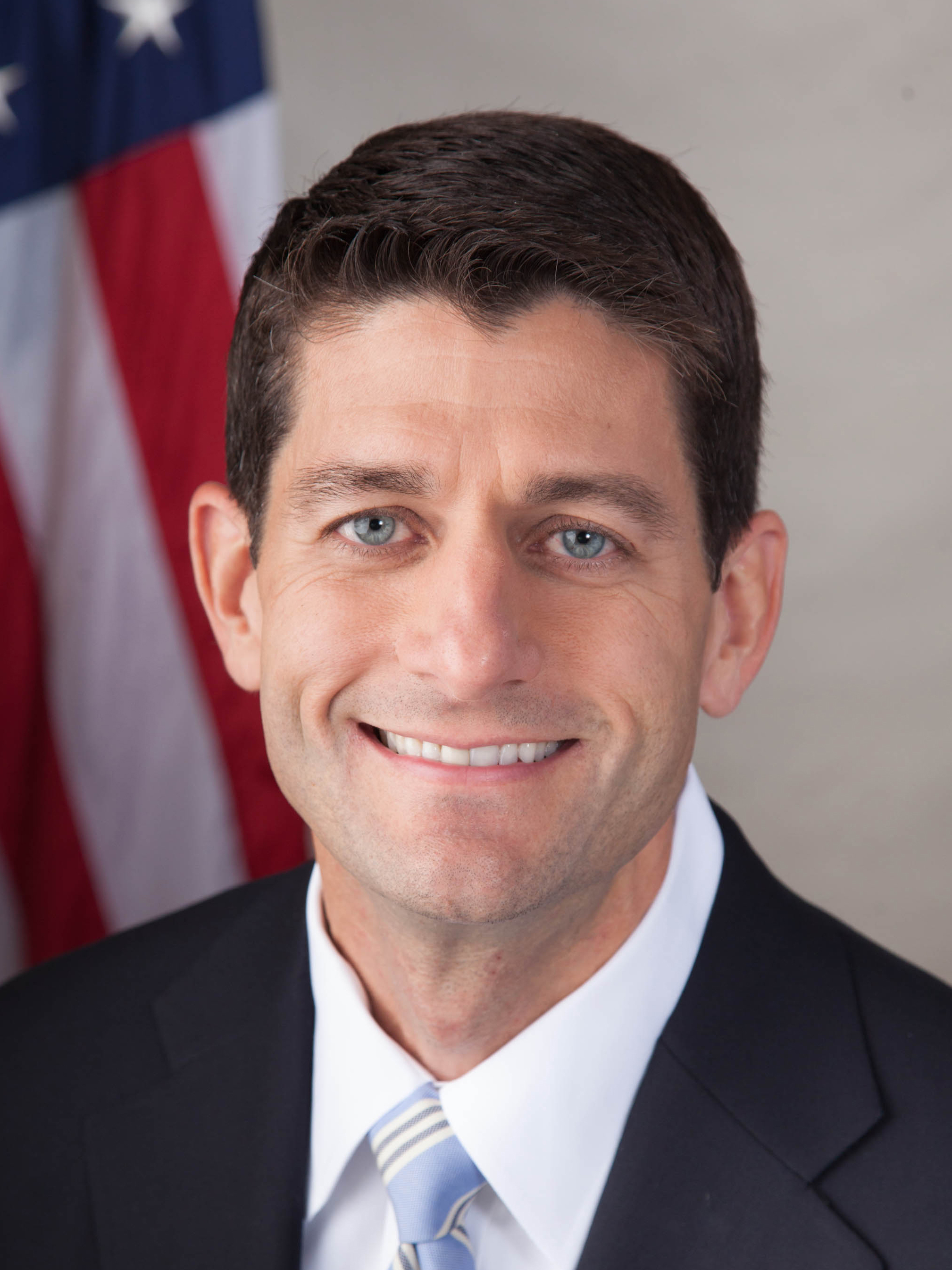

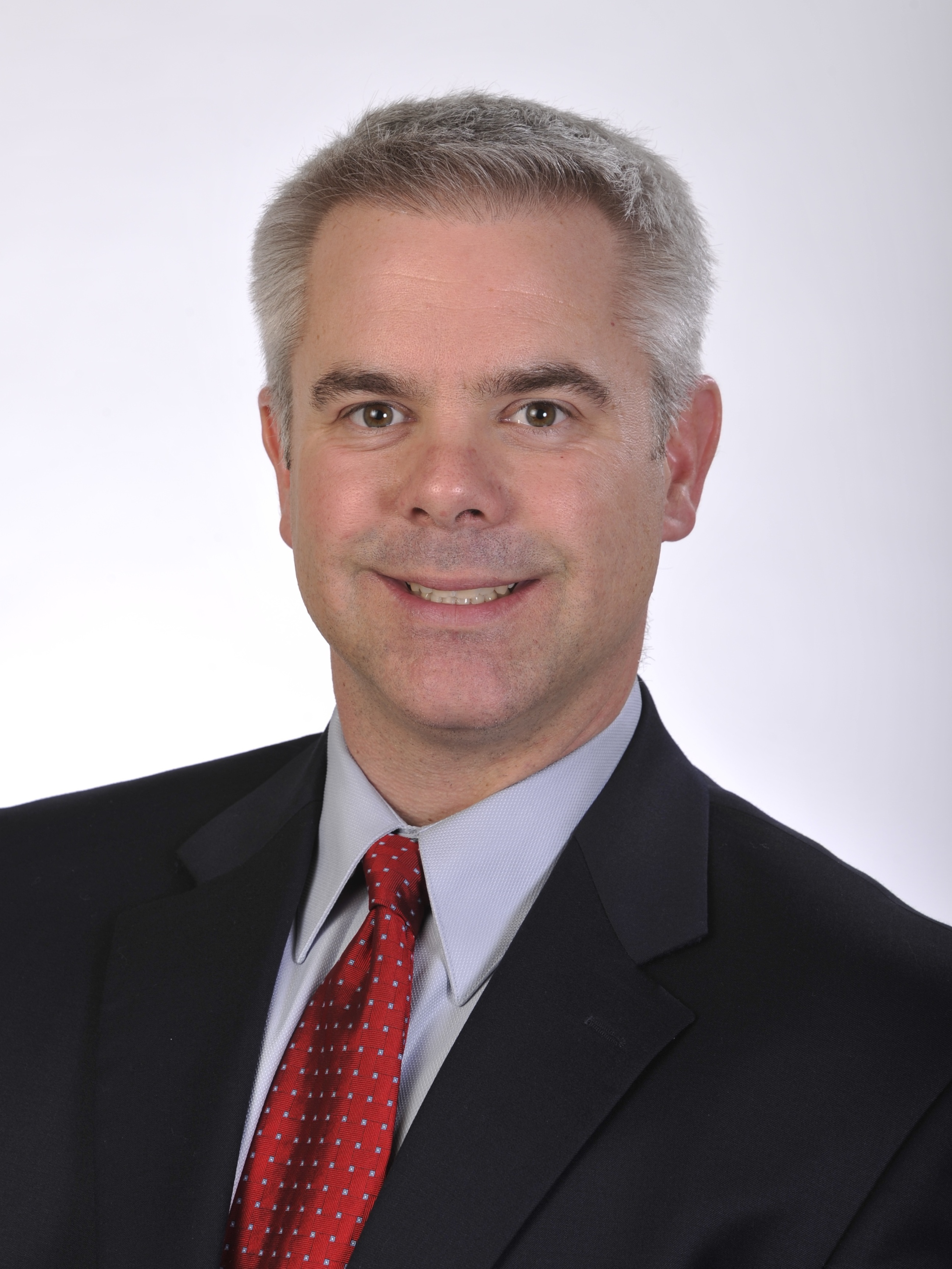
Nominee	Paul Ryan	Rob Zerban
Party	Republican	Democratic
Popular vote	200,423	158,414
Percentage	54.9%	43.4%
- Precinct results Ryan: 40–50% 50–60% 60–70% 70–80% >90% Zerban: 40–50% 50–60% 60–70% 70–80% 80–90% >90% Tie: 40–50% 50% No votes
U.S. Representative before election
Paul Ryan
Republican
Elected U.S. Representative
Paul Ryan
Republican

Republican Paul Ryan, who has represented Wisconsin's 1st congressional district since 1999, ran for reelection after deciding not to run for the U.S. Senate or seek the Republican presidential nomination in 2012.

=== Republican primary ===
==== Candidates ====
===== Nominee =====
- Paul Ryan, incumbent U.S. Representative

==== Results ====
Republican primary results
Party	Candidate	Votes	%
Republican	Paul Ryan (Incumbent)	65,700	99.6
none	Scattering	278	0.4
Total votes		65,978	100.0

=== Democratic primary ===
==== Candidates ====
===== Nominee =====
- Rob Zerban, member of the Kenosha County Board and former small business owner

==== Results ====
Democratic primary results
Party	Candidate	Votes	%
Democratic	Rob Zerban	16,265	99.8
none	Scattering	27	0.2
Total votes		16,292	100.0

=== Libertarian primary ===
==== Candidates ====
===== Nominee =====
- Keith Deschler, factory worker

=== General election ===
==== Campaign ====
Though Ryan was selected to be the Republican nominee for Vice President of the United States on August 11, 2012, he was allowed, and continued to, run for re-election to his House seat.

==== Endorsements ====
Rob Zerban (D)

Labor unions

- AFL-CIO
- International Brotherhood of Boilermakers
- National Association of Letter Carriers

Organizations

- Democratic Congressional Campaign Committee "Emerging Races" Program
- Progressive Change Campaign Committee

==== Polling ====
Poll source	Date(s) administered	Sample size	Margin of error	Paul Ryan (R)	Rob Zerban (D)	Keith Deschler (L)	Undecided
Public Opinion Strategies (R-Ryan)	September 9–10, 2012	400	±4.9%	58%	33%	3%	6%
Fairbank, Maslin, Maullin, Metz & Associates (D-Zerban)	August 21–23, 2012	404	±4.9%	47%	39%	4%	11%

==== Predictions ====
Source	Ranking	As of
The Cook Political Report	Safe R	November 5, 2012
Rothenberg	Safe R	November 2, 2012
Roll Call	Safe R	November 4, 2012
Sabato's Crystal Ball	Safe R	November 5, 2012
NY Times	Safe R	November 4, 2012
RCP	Safe R	November 4, 2012
The Hill	Safe R	November 4, 2012

==== Results ====
Wisconsin 1st Congressional District, 2012
Party	Candidate	Votes	%
Republican	Paul Ryan (Incumbent)	200,423	54.9
Democratic	Rob Zerban	158,414	43.4
Libertarian	Keith Deschler	6,054	1.7
none	Scattering	167	0.1
Total votes		365,058	100.0
Republican hold			

External links

- Financial information (federal office) at the Federal Election Commission
- Profile at Vote Smart

== District 2 ==
2012 Wisconsin's 2nd congressional district election
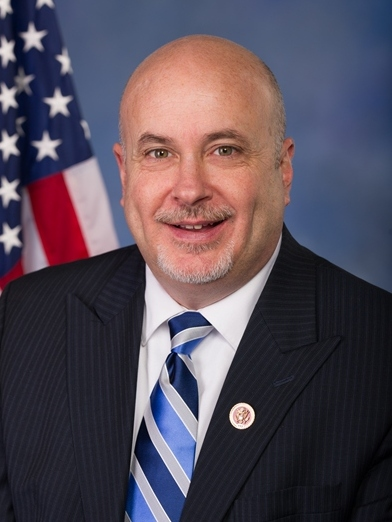

Nominee	Mark Pocan	Chad Lee
Party	Democratic	Republican
Popular vote	265,422	124,683
Percentage	67.9%	31.9%
- Precinct results Pocan: 40–50% 50–60% 60–70% 70–80% 80–90% >90% Lee: 50–60% 60–70% 70–80% >90% Tie: 40–50% 50% No votes
U.S. Representative before election
Tammy Baldwin
Democratic
Elected U.S. Representative
Mark Pocan
Democratic

Democrat Tammy Baldwin, who represented Wisconsin's 2nd congressional district since 1999, ran for the U.S. Senate.

=== Democratic primary ===
==== Candidates ====
===== Nominee =====
- Mark Pocan, state representative

===== Eliminated in primary =====
- Dennis Hall, former member of Janesville City Council
- Kelda Roys, state representative
- Matt Silverman, attorney and decorated combat veteran

===== Withdrawn =====
- Dave Worzala, Dane County Treasurer

===== Declined =====
- Tammy Baldwin, incumbent U.S. Representative
- Jon Erpenbach, state senator

==== Results ====
Democratic primary results
Party	Candidate	Votes	%
Democratic	Mark Pocan	43,171	72.2
Democratic	Kelda Roys	13,081	21.9
Democratic	Matt Silverman	2,365	4.0
Democratic	Dennis Hall	1,163	1.9
none	Scattering	46	0.1
Total votes		59,826	100.0

=== Republican primary ===
==== Candidates ====
===== Nominee =====
- Chad Lee, businessman and nominee for this seat in 2010

==== Results ====
Republican primary results
Party	Candidate	Votes	%
Republican	Chad Lee	32,813	99.5
none	Scattering	158	0.5
Total votes		32,971	100.0

=== General election ===
==== Endorsements ====
Mark Pocan (D)

Labor unions

- AFL-CIO
- International Brotherhood of Boilermakers
- National Association of Letter Carriers

Organizations

- Democratic Congressional Campaign Committee "Majority Makers" Program
- Human Rights Campaign
- Progressive Change Campaign Committee

==== Predictions ====
Source	Ranking	As of
The Cook Political Report	Safe D	November 5, 2012
Rothenberg	Safe D	November 2, 2012
Roll Call	Safe D	November 4, 2012
Sabato's Crystal Ball	Safe D	November 5, 2012
NY Times	Safe D	November 4, 2012
RCP	Safe D	November 4, 2012
The Hill	Safe D	November 4, 2012

==== Results ====
Wisconsin 2nd Congressional District, 2012
Party	Candidate	Votes	%
Democratic	Mark Pocan	265,422	67.9
Republican	Chad Lee	124,683	31.9
Write-In	Joe Kopsick	6	0.0
none	Scattering	787	0.2
Total votes		390,898	100.0
Democratic hold			

== District 3 ==
2012 Wisconsin's 3rd congressional district election
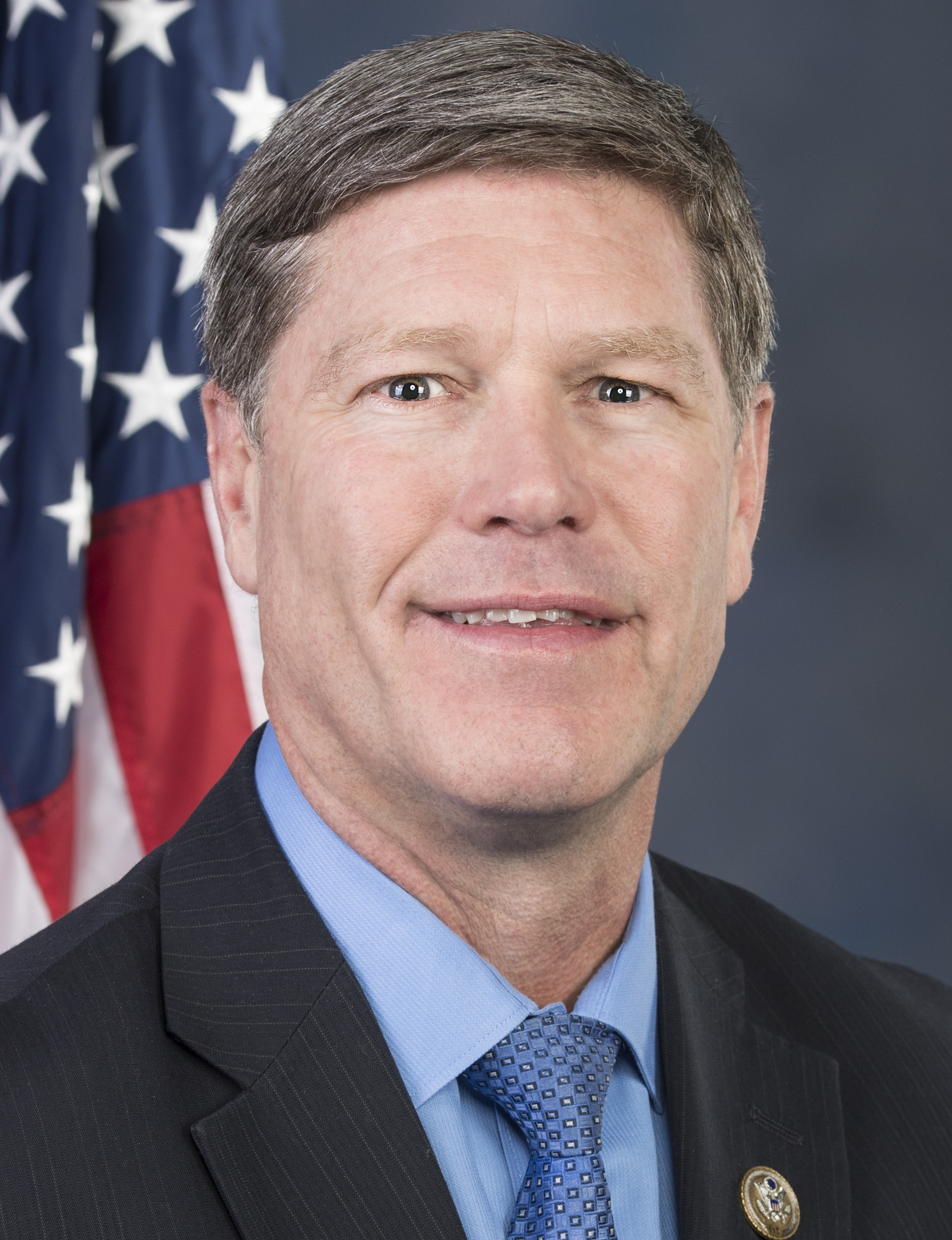

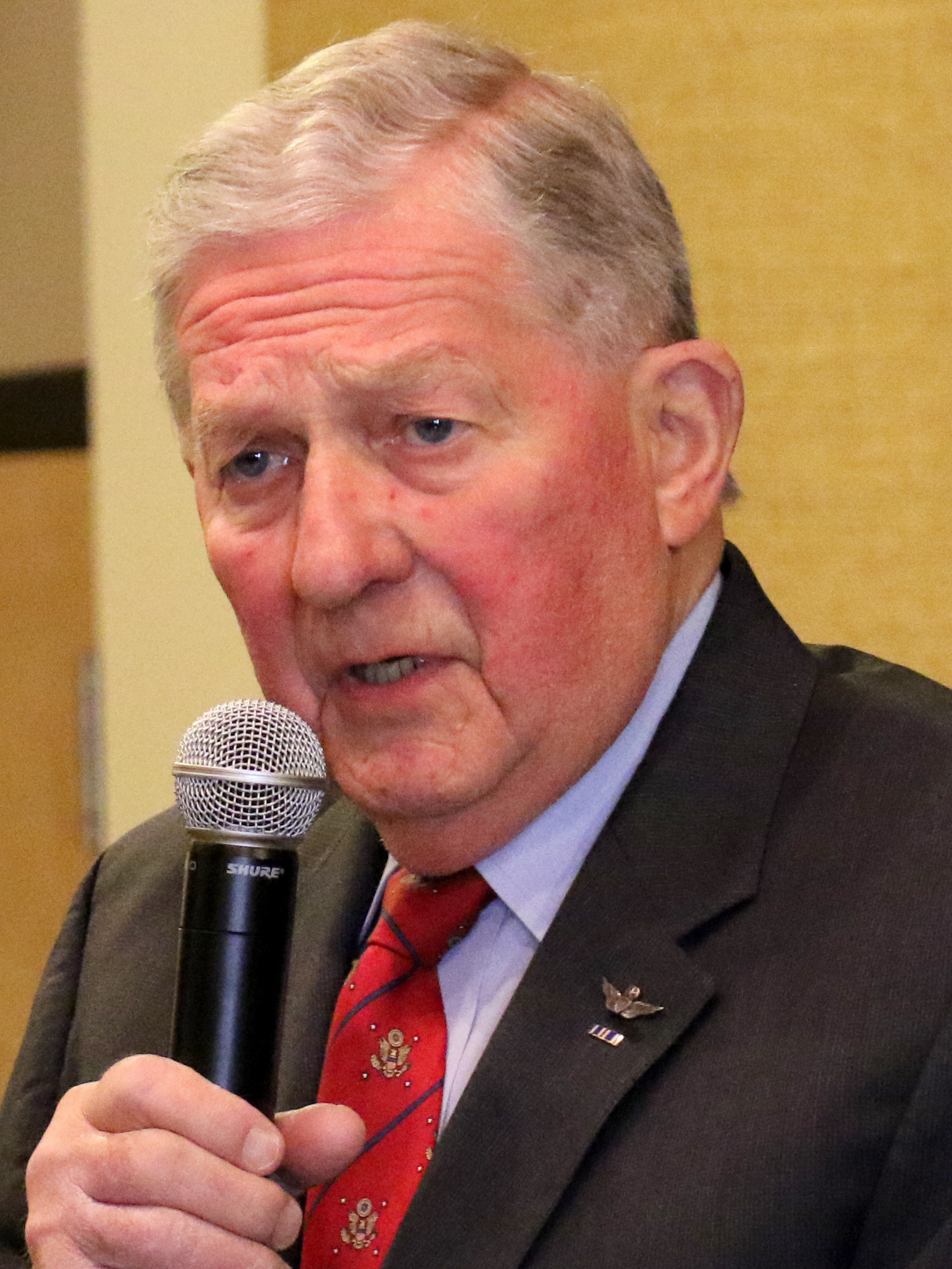
Nominee	Ron Kind	Ray Boland
Party	Democratic	Republican
Popular vote	217,712	121,713
Percentage	64.1%	35.8%
- Kind: 50–60% 60–70% 70–80% 80–90% >90% Boland: 50–60% 60–70% >90% Tie: 50% No votes
U.S. Representative before election
Ron Kind
Democratic
Elected U.S. Representative
Ron Kind
Democratic

Democrat Ron Kind, who has represented Wisconsin's 3rd congressional district since 1997, did not run for the U.S. Senate and instead ran for re-election.

=== Democratic primary ===
==== Candidates ====
===== Nominee =====
- Ron Kind, incumbent U.S. Representative

==== Results ====
Democratic primary results
Party	Candidate	Votes	%
Democratic	Ron Kind (Incumbent)	19,755	99.9
none	Scattering	27	0.1
Total votes		19,782	100.0

=== Republican primary ===
==== Candidates ====
===== Nominee =====
- Ray Boland, former state Secretary of Veterans Affairs and former commander at Fort McCoy

===== Withdrawn =====
- Edward Martin, retired Army sergeant

===== Declined =====
- Bruce Evers, financial adviser and candidate for this seat in 2010

==== Results ====
Republican primary results
Party	Candidate	Votes	%
Republican	Ray Boland	35,668	99.6
none	Scattering	148	0.4
Total votes		35,816	100.0

=== General election ===
==== Endorsements ====
Ron Kind (D)

Labor unions

- International Brotherhood of Boilermakers
- National Association of Letter Carriers

Organizations

- Human Rights Campaign

==== Predictions ====
Source	Ranking	As of
The Cook Political Report	Safe D	November 5, 2012
Rothenberg	Safe D	November 2, 2012
Roll Call	Safe D	November 4, 2012
Sabato's Crystal Ball	Safe D	November 5, 2012
NY Times	Safe D	November 4, 2012
RCP	Safe D	November 4, 2012
The Hill	Safe D	November 4, 2012

==== Results ====
Wisconsin 3rd Congressional District, 2012
Party	Candidate	Votes	%
Democratic	Ron Kind (Incumbent)	217,712	64.1
Republican	Ray Boland	121,713	35.8
none	Scattering	339	0.1
Total votes		339,764	100.0

== District 4 ==
2012 Wisconsin's 4th congressional district election
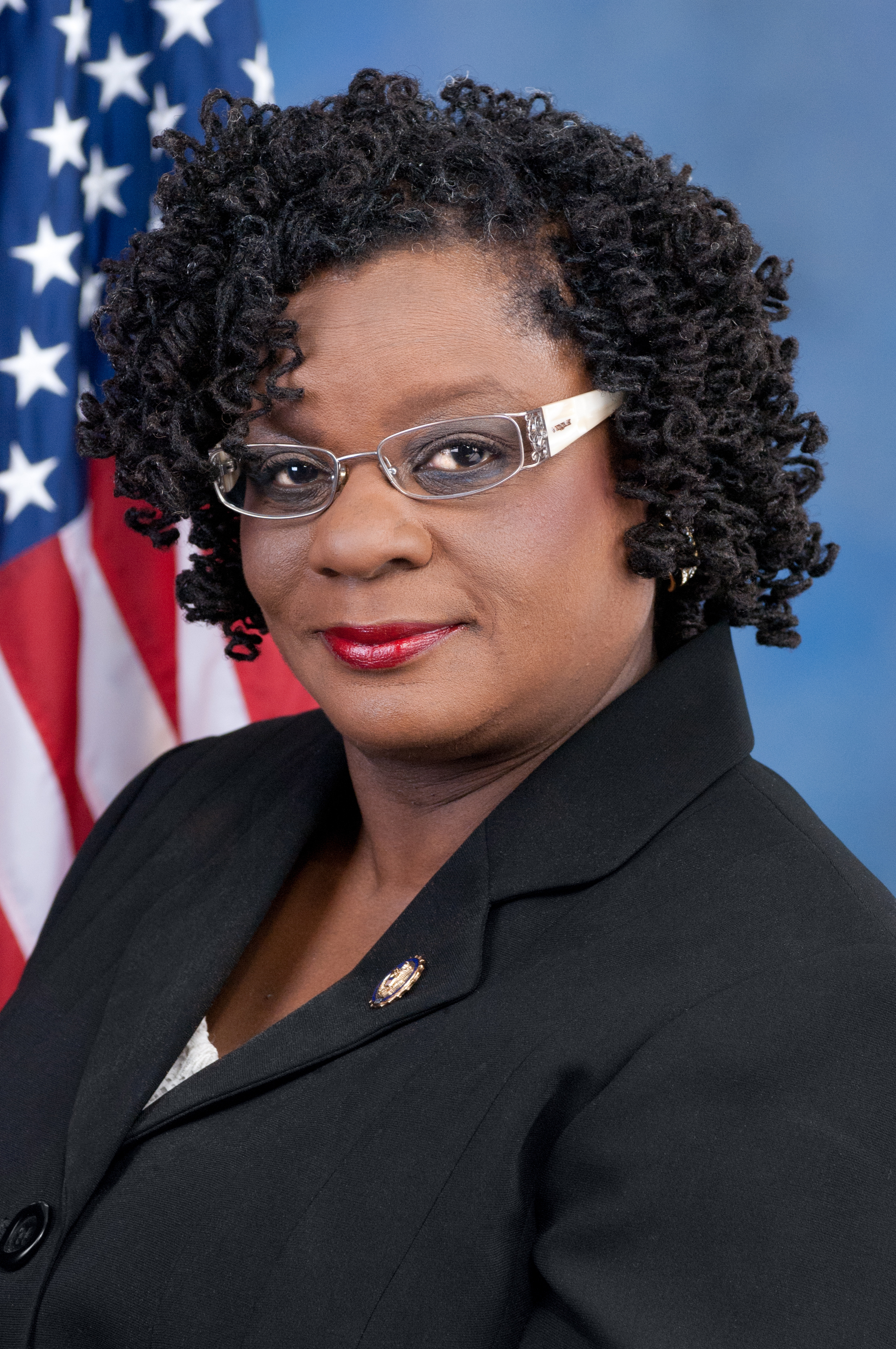

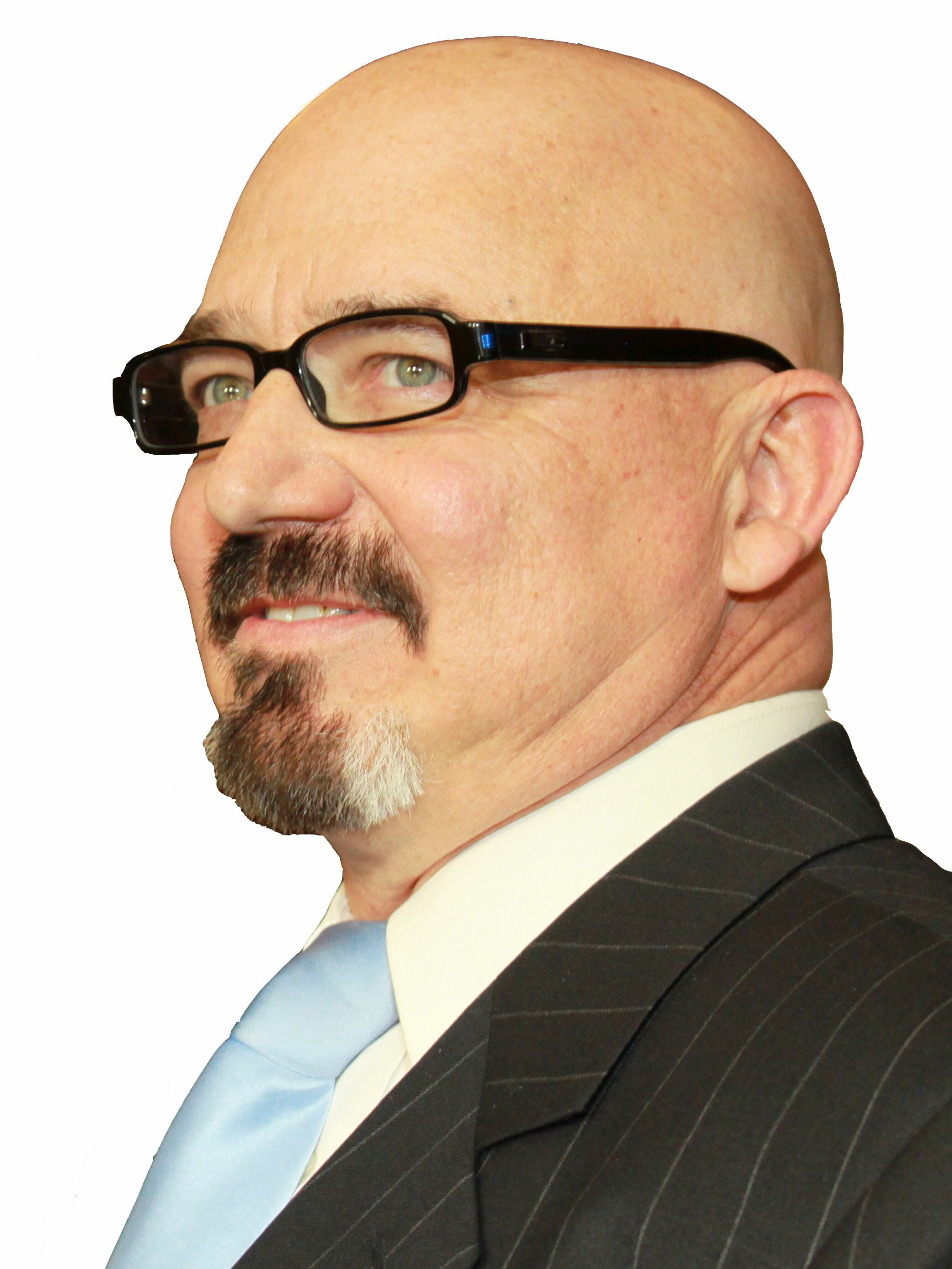
Nominee	Gwen Moore	Dan Sebring
Party	Democratic	Republican
Popular vote	235,257	80,787
Percentage	72.2%	24.8%
- Precinct results Moore: 40–50% 50–60% 60–70% 70–80% 80–90% >90% Sebring: 40–50% 50–60% 60–70% >90% No votes
U.S. Representative before election
Gwen Moore
Democratic
Elected U.S. Representative
Gwen Moore
Democratic

Democrat Gwen Moore, who had represented Wisconsin's 4th congressional district since 2005, ran for re-election.

=== Democratic primary ===
==== Candidates ====
===== Nominee =====
- Gwen Moore, incumbent U.S. Representative

==== Results ====
Democratic primary results
Party	Candidate	Votes	%
Democratic	Gwen Moore	34,525	99.7
none	Scattering	115	0.3
Total votes		34,640	100.0

=== Republican primary ===
==== Candidates ====
===== Nominee =====
- Dan Sebring, automobile repair shop owner and nominee for this seat in 2010

==== Results ====
Republican primary results
Party	Candidate	Votes	%
Republican	Dan Sebring	19,144	99.0
none	Scattering	200	1.0
Total votes		19,344	100.0

=== Independents ===
- Robert R. Raymond, perennial candidate

=== General election ===
==== Endorsements ====
Gwen Moore (D)

Labor unions

- AFL-CIO
- International Brotherhood of Boilermakers
- National Association of Letter Carriers

==== Predictions ====
Source	Ranking	As of
The Cook Political Report	Safe D	November 5, 2012
Rothenberg	Safe D	November 2, 2012
Roll Call	Safe D	November 4, 2012
Sabato's Crystal Ball	Safe D	November 5, 2012
NY Times	Safe D	November 4, 2012
RCP	Safe D	November 4, 2012
The Hill	Safe D	November 4, 2012

==== Results ====
Wisconsin 4th Congressional District, 2012
Party	Candidate	Votes	%
Democratic	Gwen Moore (incumbent)	235,257	72.2
Republican	Dan Sebring	80,787	24.8
Independent	Robert R. Raymond	9,277	2.9
none	Scattering	467	0.1
Total votes		325,788	100.0
Democratic hold			

== District 5 ==
2012 Wisconsin's 5th congressional district election
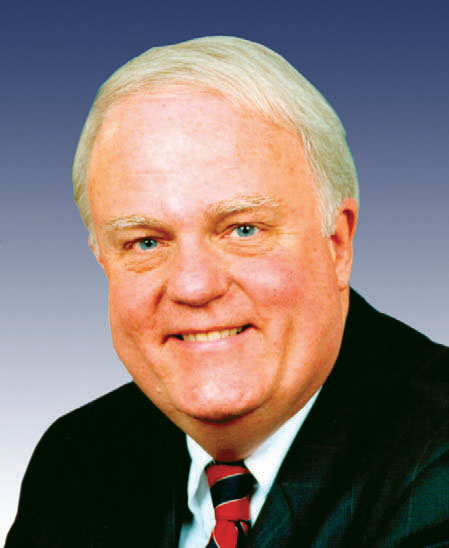

Nominee	Jim Sensenbrenner	Dave Heaster
Party	Republican	Democratic
Popular vote	250,335	118,478
Percentage	67.7%	32.1%
- Precinct results Sensenbrenner: 40–50% 50–60% 60–70% 70–80% 80–90% >90% Heaster: 40–50% 50–60% 60–70% No votes
U.S. Representative before election
Jim Sensenbrenner
Republican
Elected U.S. Representative
Jim Sensenbrenner
Republican

Republican Jim Sensenbrenner, who has represented Wisconsin's 5th congressional district since 2003 (and previously represented Wisconsin's 9th congressional district from 1979 to 2003), ran for re-election.

=== Republican primary ===
==== Candidates ====
===== Nominee =====
- Jim Sensenbrenner, incumbent U.S. Representative

==== Results ====
Republican primary results
Party	Candidate	Votes	%
Republican	Jim Sensenbrenner	89,370	99.4
none	Scattering	535	0.6
Total votes		89,905	100.0

=== Democratic primary ===
==== Candidates ====
===== Nominee =====
- Dave Heaster, technology employee at the Kohler Company

==== Results ====
Republican primary results
Party	Candidate	Votes	%
Democratic	Dave Heaster	9,266	99.9
none	Scattering	13	0.1
Total votes		9,279	100.0

=== General election ===
==== Predictions ====
Source	Ranking	As of
The Cook Political Report	Safe R	November 5, 2012
Rothenberg	Safe R	November 2, 2012
Roll Call	Safe R	November 4, 2012
Sabato's Crystal Ball	Safe R	November 5, 2012
NY Times	Safe R	November 4, 2012
RCP	Safe R	November 4, 2012
The Hill	Safe R	November 4, 2012

==== Results ====
Wisconsin 5th Congressional District, 2012
Party	Candidate	Votes	%
Republican	Jim Sensenbrenner (Incumbent)	250,335	67.7
Democratic	Dave Heaster	118,478	32.1
none	Scattering	851	0.2
Total votes		369,664	100.0
Republican hold			

== District 6 ==
2012 Wisconsin's 6th congressional district election
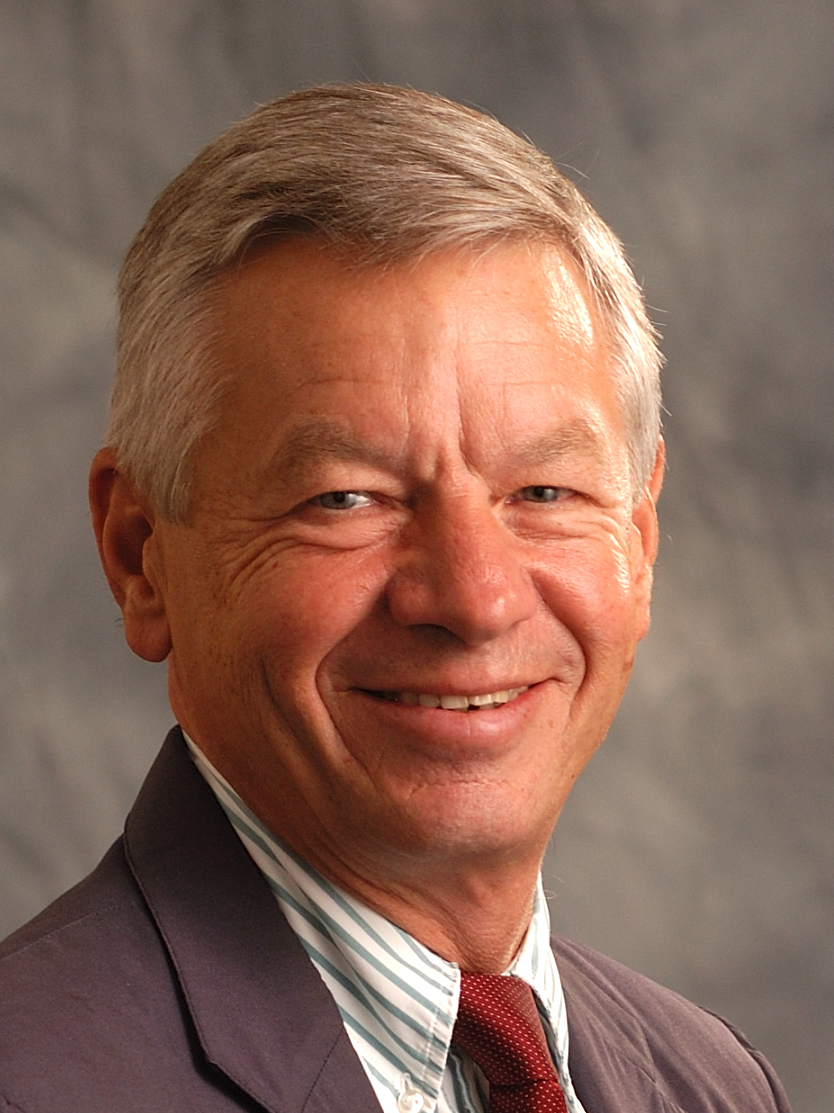

Nominee	Tom Petri	Joe Kallas
Party	Republican	Democratic
Popular vote	223,460	135,921
Percentage	62.1%	37.8%
- Precinct results Petri: 50–60% 60–70% 70–80% 80–90% >90% Kallas: 50–60% 60–70% >90% Tie: 40–50% 50% No votes
U.S. Representative before election
Tom Petri
Republican
Elected U.S. Representative
Tom Petri
Republican

Republican Tom Petri, who has represented Wisconsin's 6th congressional district since 1979, ran for re-election.

=== Republican primary ===
==== Candidates ====
===== Nominee =====
- Tom Petri, incumbent U.S. Representative

===== Eliminated in primary =====
- Lauren Stephens, founder of a conservative political action committee.

==== Results ====
Republican primary results
Party	Candidate	Votes	%
Republican	Tom Petri (incumbent)	73,376	82.2
Republican	Lauren Stephens	15,821	17.7
none	Scattering	75	0.1
Total votes		89,272	100.0

=== Democratic primary ===
==== Candidates ====
===== Nominee =====
- Joe Kallas, former member of the Green Lake County Board and nominee for this seat in 2010

==== Results ====
Democratic primary results
Party	Candidate	Votes	%
Democratic	Joe Kallas	11,285	99.8
none	Scattering	18	0.2
Total votes		11,303	100.0

=== General election ===
==== Predictions ====
Source	Ranking	As of
The Cook Political Report	Safe R	November 5, 2012
Rothenberg	Safe R	November 2, 2012
Roll Call	Safe R	November 4, 2012
Sabato's Crystal Ball	Safe R	November 5, 2012
NY Times	Safe R	November 4, 2012
RCP	Safe R	November 4, 2012
The Hill	Safe R	November 4, 2012

==== Results ====
Wisconsin 6th Congressional District, 2012
Party	Candidate	Votes	%
Republican	Tom Petri (Incumbent)	223,460	62.1
Democratic	Joe Kallas	135,921	37.8
none	Scattering	364	0.1
Total votes		359,745	100.0
Republican hold			

== District 7 ==
2012 Wisconsin's 7th congressional district election
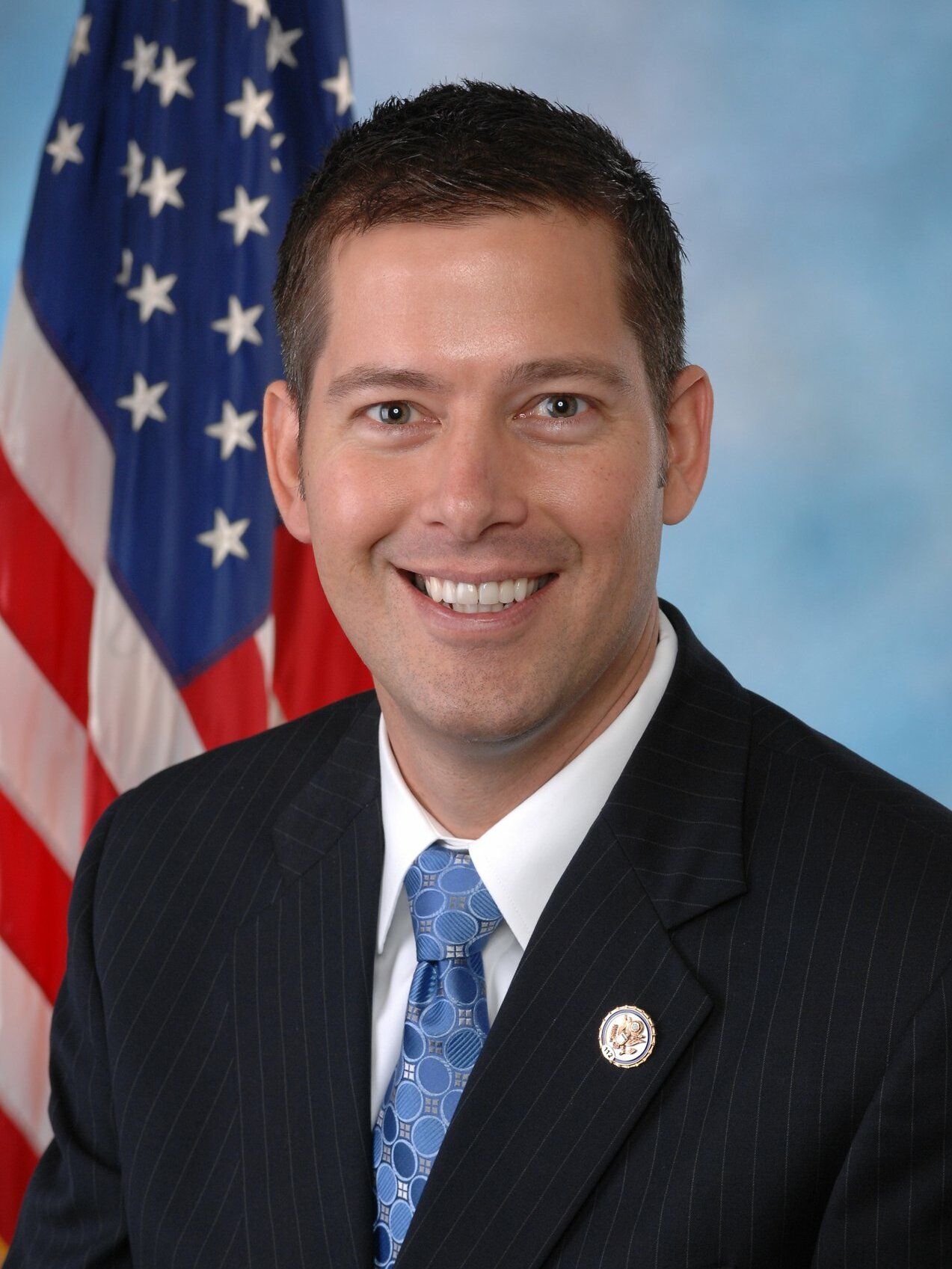

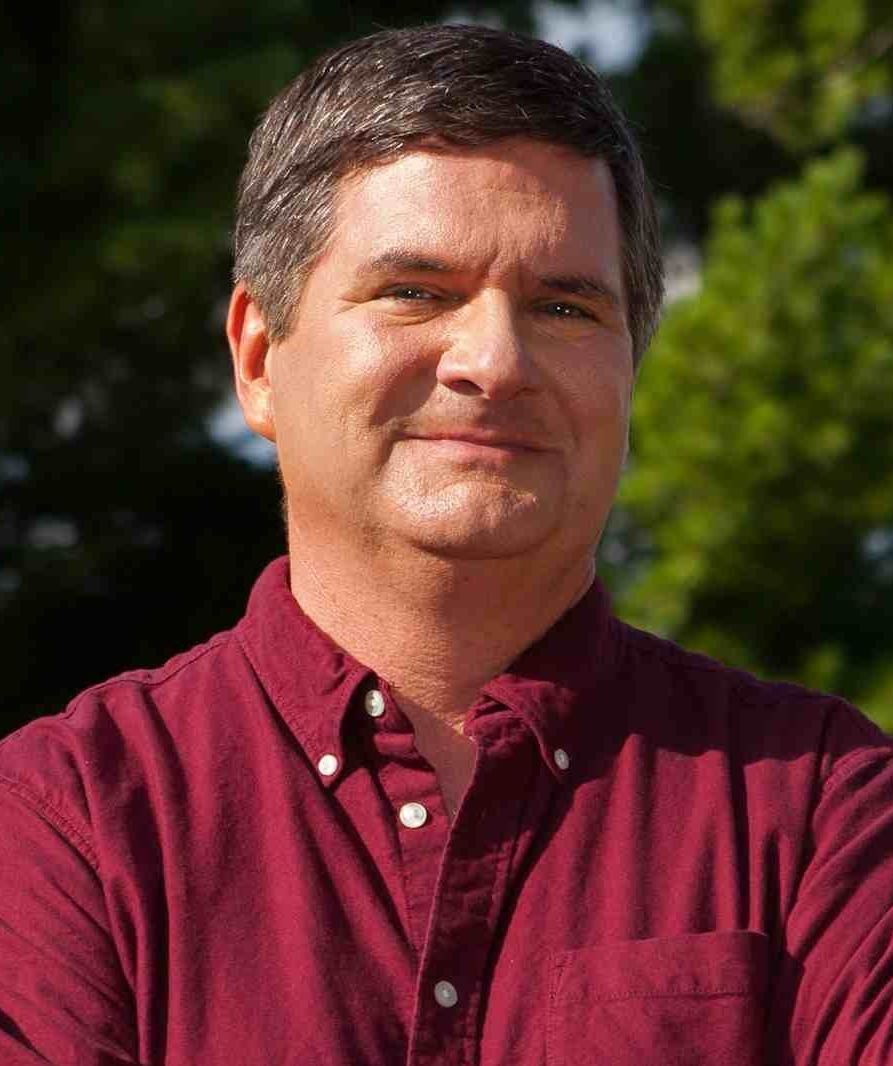
Nominee	Sean Duffy	Pat Kreitlow
Party	Republican	Democratic
Popular vote	201,720	157,524
Percentage	56.1%	43.8%
- Precinct results Duffy: 50–60% 60–70% 70–80% 80–90% >90% Kreitlow: 40–50% 50–60% 60–70% 70–80% 80–90% >90% Tie: 40–50% 50% No votes
U.S. Representative before election
Sean Duffy
Republican
Elected U.S. Representative
Sean Duffy
Republican

Republican Sean Duffy, who has represented Wisconsin's 7th congressional district since 2011, ran for re-election.

=== Republican primary ===
==== Candidates ====
===== Nominee =====
- Sean Duffy, incumbent U.S. Representative

==== Results ====
Republican primary results
Party	Candidate	Votes	%
Republican	Sean Duffy	46,987	99.5
none	Scattering	252	0.5
Total votes		47,239	100.0

=== Democratic primary ===
==== Candidates ====
===== Nominee =====
- Pat Kreitlow, former state Senator

===== Declined =====
- Janet Bewley, state representative

==== Results ====
Democratic primary results
Party	Candidate	Votes	%
Democratic	Pat Kreitlow	16,053	99.9
none	Scattering	19	0.1
Total votes		16,072	100.0

=== General election ===
==== Endorsements ====
Sean Duffy (R)

Organizations

- National Republican Congressional Committee "Patriot" Program
Pat Kreitlow (D)

Labor unions

- AFL-CIO
- International Brotherhood of Boilermakers
- National Association of Letter Carriers

Organizations

- Democratic Congressional Campaign Committee "Red to Blue" Program

==== Polling ====
Poll source	Date(s) administered	Sample size	Margin of error	Sean Duffy (R)	Pat Kreitlow (D)	Undecided
NMB Research (R-American Action Network)	September 30–October 1, 2012	400	±4.9%	51%	40%	9%
Fairbank, Maslin, Maullin, Metz & Associates (D-Kreitlow)	September 25–26, 2012	509	±4.4%	44%	41%	15%
Public Policy Polling (D-CREDO)	September 24–25, 2012	694	±3.7%	48%	44%	7%

==== Predictions ====
Source	Ranking	As of
The Cook Political Report	Lean R	November 5, 2012
Rothenberg	Lean R	November 2, 2012
Roll Call	Likely R	November 4, 2012
Sabato's Crystal Ball	Lean R	November 5, 2012
NY Times	Lean R	November 4, 2012
RCP	Lean R	November 4, 2012
The Hill	Tossup	November 4, 2012

==== Results ====
Wisconsin 7th Congressional District 2012
Party	Candidate	Votes	%
Republican	Sean Duffy (Incumbent)	201,720	56.1
Democratic	Pat Kreitlow	157,524	43.8
none	Scattering	405	0.1
Write-In	Dale C. Hehner	20	0.0
Total votes		359,669	100.0
Republican hold			

== District 8 ==
2012 Wisconsin's 8th congressional district election
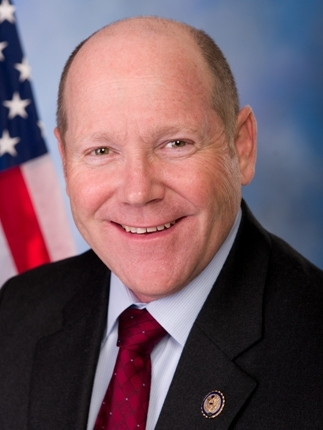

Nominee	Reid Ribble	Jamie Wall
Party	Republican	Democratic
Popular vote	198,874	156,287
Percentage	56.0%	44.0%
- Precinct results Ribble: 50–60% 60–70% 70–80% 80–90% >90% Wall: 50–60% 60–70% 70–80% 80–90% Tie: 40–50% 50% No votes
U.S. Representative before election
Reid Ribble
Republican
Elected U.S. Representative
Reid Ribble
Republican

Republican Reid Ribble, who has represented Wisconsin's 8th congressional district since 2011, ran for re-election.

=== Republican primary ===
==== Candidates ====
===== Nominee =====
- Reid Ribble, incumbent U.S. Representative

==== Results ====
Republican primary results
Party	Candidate	Votes	%
Republican	Reid Ribble	64,689	99.6
none	Scattering	251	0.4
Total votes		64,940	100.0

=== Democratic primary ===
==== Candidates ====
===== Nominee =====
- Jamie Wall, business consultant and candidate for this seat in 2006

==== Results ====
Democratic primary results
Party	Candidate	Votes	%
Democratic	Jamie Wall	11,513	99.8
none	Scattering	19	0.2
Total votes		11,532	100.0

=== General election ===
==== Polling ====
Poll source	Date(s) administered	Sample size	Margin of error	Reid Ribble (R)	Jamie Wall (D)	Undecided
Normington, Petts & Associates (D)	September 18–19, 2012	400	±4.9%	47%	41%	12%

==== Endorsements ====
Reid Ribble (R)

Organizations

- National Republican Congressional Committee "Patriot" Program
Jamie Wall (D)

Labor unions

- AFL-CIO
- International Brotherhood of Boilermakers
- National Association of Letter Carriers

Organizations

- Democratic Congressional Campaign Committee "Red to Blue" Program

==== Predictions ====
Source	Ranking	As of
The Cook Political Report	Likely R	November 5, 2012
Rothenberg	Safe R	November 2, 2012
Roll Call	Safe R	November 4, 2012
Sabato's Crystal Ball	Likely R	November 5, 2012
NY Times	Lean R	November 4, 2012
RCP	Likely R	November 4, 2012
The Hill	Likely R	November 4, 2012

==== Results ====
Wisconsin 8th Congressional District, 2012
Party	Candidate	Votes	%
Republican	Reid Ribble (Incumbent)	198,874	56.0
Democratic	Jamie Wall	156,287	44.0
none	Scattering	303	0.1
Total votes		355,464	100.0
Republican hold			

External links

- Financial information (federal office) at the Federal Election Commission
- Profile at Vote Smart

Official campaign websites
- District 1
  - Paul Ryan campaign website
  - Rob Zerban campaign website
- District 2
  - Chad Lee campaign website
  - Mark Pocan campaign website
- District 3
  - Ray Boland campaign website
  - Ron Kind campaign website
- District 4
  - Gwen Moore campaign website
  - Dan Sebring campaign website
- District 5
  - Dave Heaster campaign website
  - Jim Sensenbrenner campaign website
- District 6
  - Joe Kallas campaign website
  - Tom Petri campaign website
- District 7
  - Sean Duffy campaign website
  - Pat Kreitlow campaign website
- District 8
  - Reid Ribble campaign website
  - Jamie Wall campaign website
