= Stephen Moulton (soldier) =

Stephen Moulton

Lt. Col. Stephen Moulton and his sons fought in one of the most pivotal battles of the American Revolutionary War.

Fighting a rear guard action for three days as George Washington directed the American retreat from Long Island, Moulton and three of his sons were finally captured on September 15, 1775. Moulton and his sons, all officers, were detained as prisoners of war by General Howe’s Adjutant in the notorious Sugar House Prison in New York City. After being held for five months by General Howe's forces, Moulton and his sons were exchanged for British officers held by General Washington's staff in March 1777.
