= Kristen Dexter =

American politician

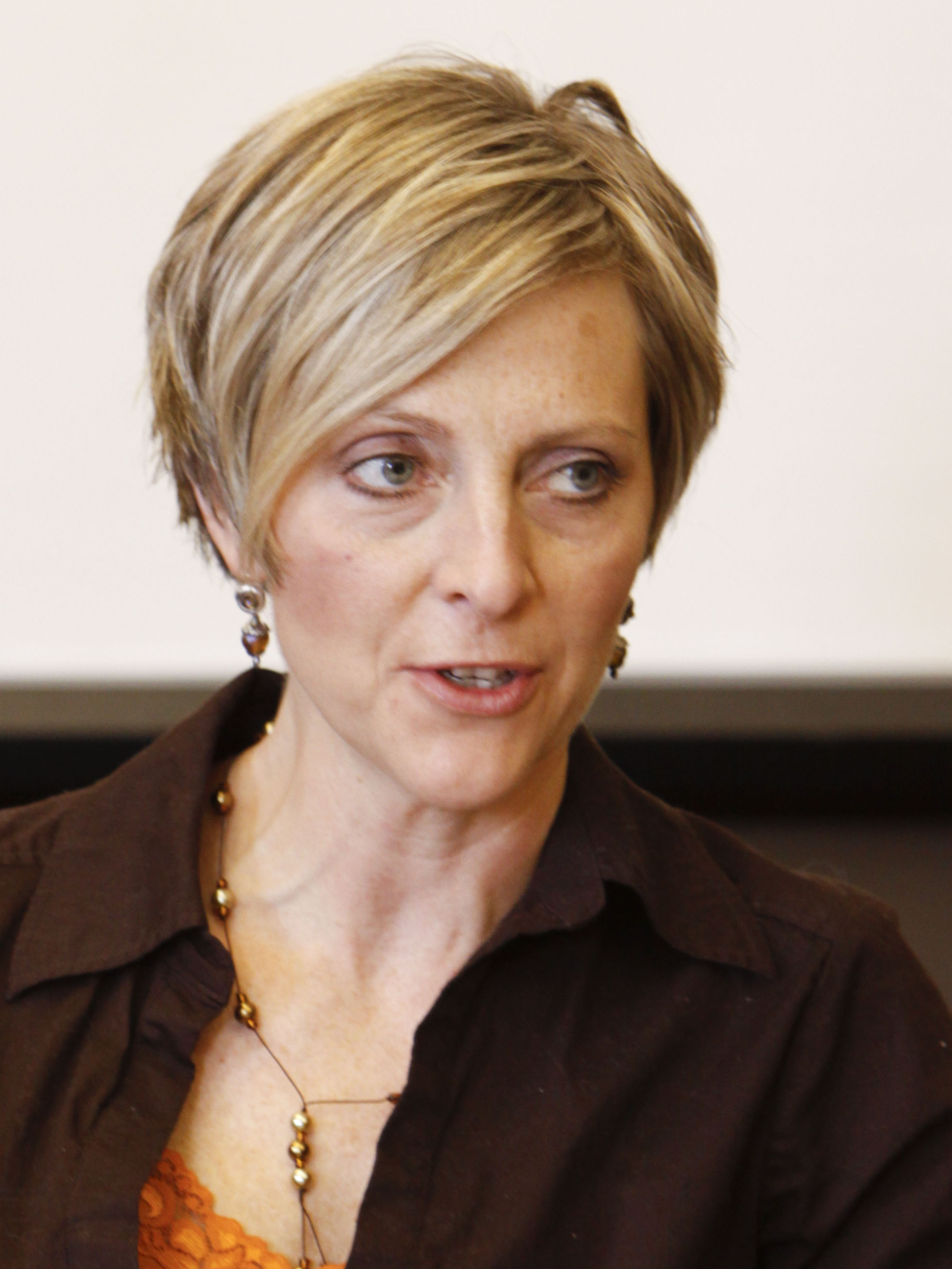
- Dexter in 2009

Member of the Wisconsin State Assembly from the 68th district
- In office January 3, 2009 – January 3, 2011
- Preceded by: Terry Moulton
- Succeeded by: Kathy Bernier

Personal details
- Born: Kristen Ann Gillie; July 20, 1961 (age 65) Hallock, Minnesota, U.S.
- Party: Democratic
- Spouse: Donn Dexter
- Children: 3
- Education: University of Wisconsin–River Falls
- Occupation: metalsmith

Kristen Dexter (born July 20, 1961) is a Democratic Party politician and former member of the Wisconsin State Assembly, who represented the 68th Assembly District from 2009 to 2011. She defeated long-time incumbent Representative Terry Moulton in the November 2008 election. In 2010, she ran for re-election but was defeated by her challenger, Chippewa County Clerk Kathy Bernier.

== Early life and career ==
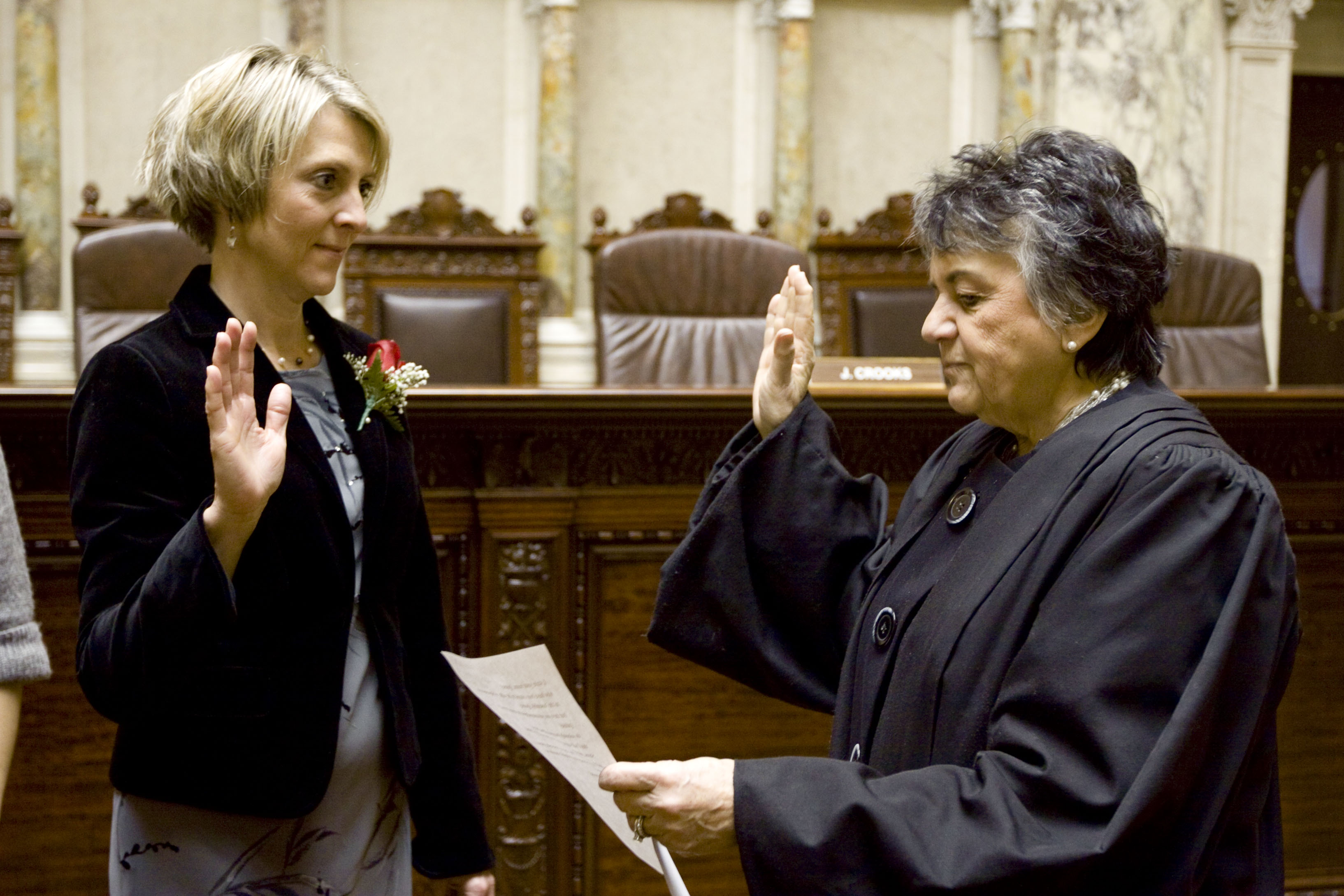
Justice Shirley Abrahamson (right) ceremonially administering an oath of office to Dexter in 2009

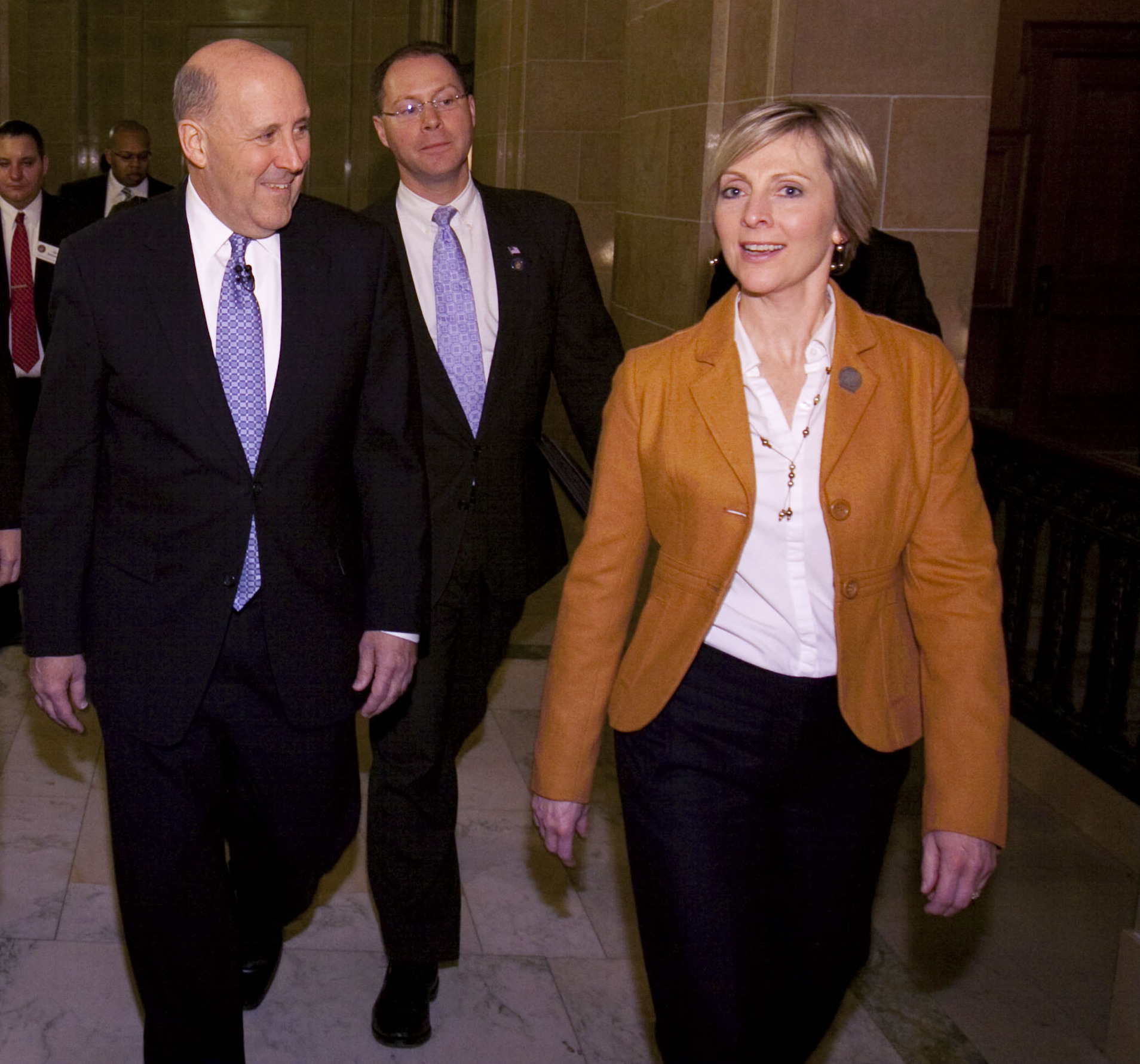
Dexter (right) with Governor Jim Doyle (left) in 2009

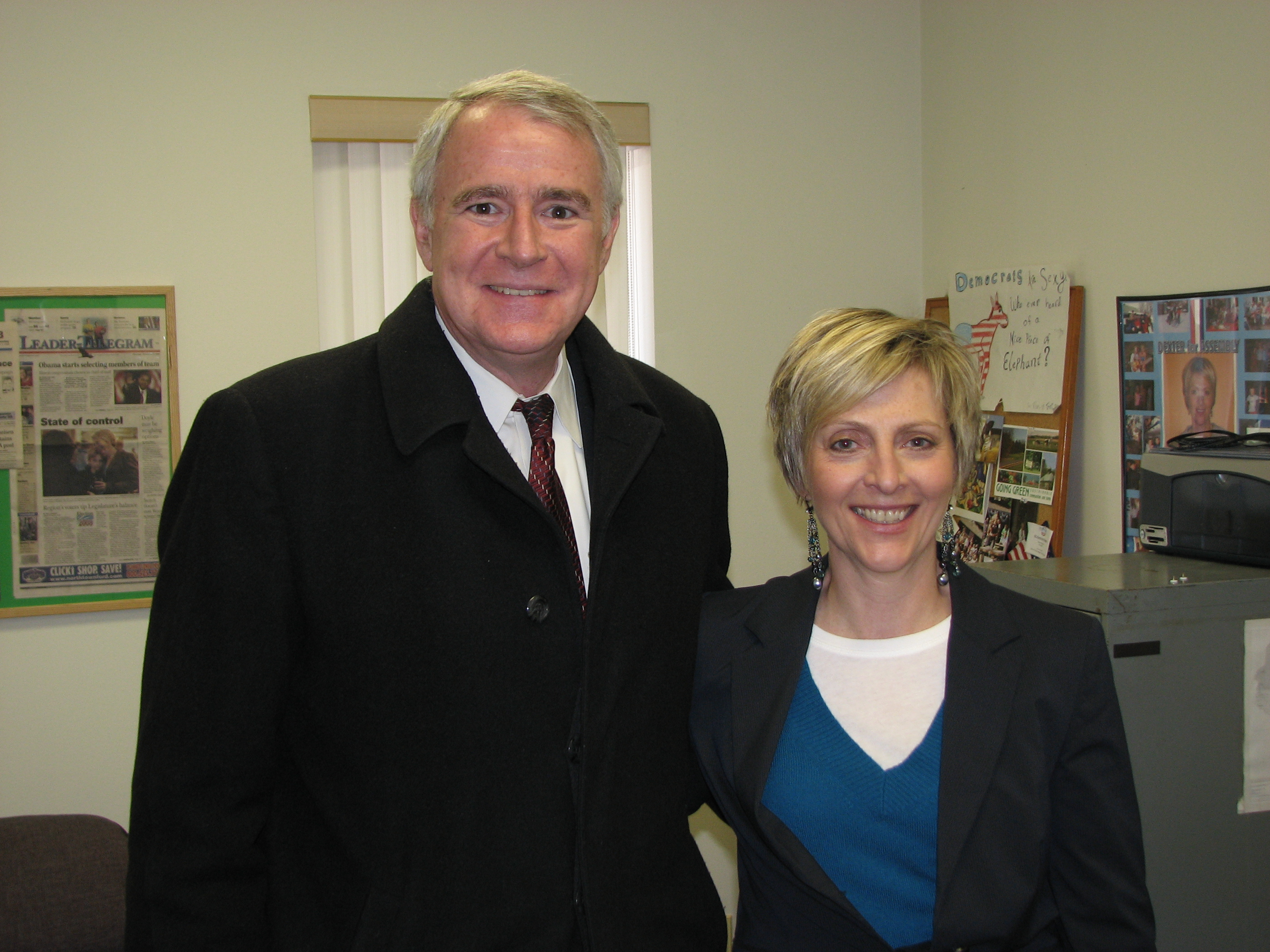
Dexter with Milwaukee Mayor Tom Barrett in 2010

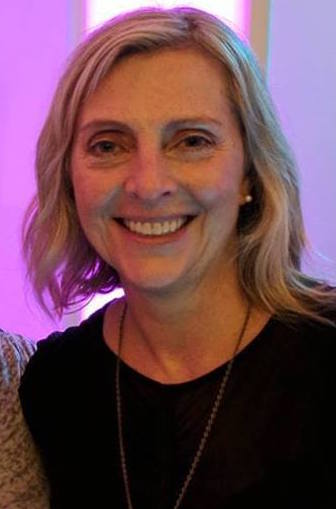
Dexter in 2017

Dexter was born and raised in Hallock, Minnesota. A graduate of UW-River Falls, she is a metalsmith by trade. Dexter and her husband Donn Dexter, a neurologist at Mayo Clinic in Eau Claire, have three children.

Dexter was elected to the Altoona Board of Education in 2002 and served for six years. She sat on the Educational Planning Council and Policy Committee for the school district. After helping Pat Kreitlow win election to the Wisconsin State Senate in 2006, Dexter worked as his Community Outreach Director. She has been a volunteer with the Girl Scouts, Meals on Wheels, the Eau Claire Municipal Band, and served on the Regional Steering Committee for Health Literacy Wisconsin.

=== Wisconsin Assembly (2009-11) ===
During her time in the legislature, Dexter served as vice chair of the Assembly Education Committee, and chair of the committees on Public Health, Renewable Energy and Rural Affairs, and Rural Economic Development. Dexter authored bills to support rural school districts, and was awarded "Legislator of the Year" by the Schools Administrators Alliance and the Wisconsin Association of School Boards. Dexter helped pass the 2009 state Equal Pay law that allowed women and others who have been discriminated against to seek fair compensation from their employer.

After her term in the legislature, Dexter served as the chair of the Eau Claire County Democratic Party. She later worked as the regional representative to U.S. Senator Tammy Baldwin and became co-owner of a community kitchen space in Eau Claire. Dexter has been an organizer behind Chippewa Valley Restaurant Week in Eau Claire.

=== Senate Recall (2012) ===
Dexter unsuccessfully challenged Terry Moulton on the June 5 Senate Recall Election. She defeated "fake" Democratic candidate James Engel in the primary on May 8, 2012. Supporters of the recall submitted over 21,000 signatures on January 17, 2012. The Wisconsin Government Accountability Board voted unanimously on March 12 to order the recall, determining that at least 18,657 of the signatures were valid.
