= Charles Moulton =

Charles Moulton may refer to:

- William Moulton Marston (1893–1947), pen name Charles Moulton, American psychologist, lawyer, inventor, and comic book writer who created the character Wonder Woman
- Charles Wells Moulton (1859–1913), American poet, critic, and editor
- Charles Moulton (choreographer) (born 1954), American choreographer and visual artist
