= Pat Kreitlow =

American politician

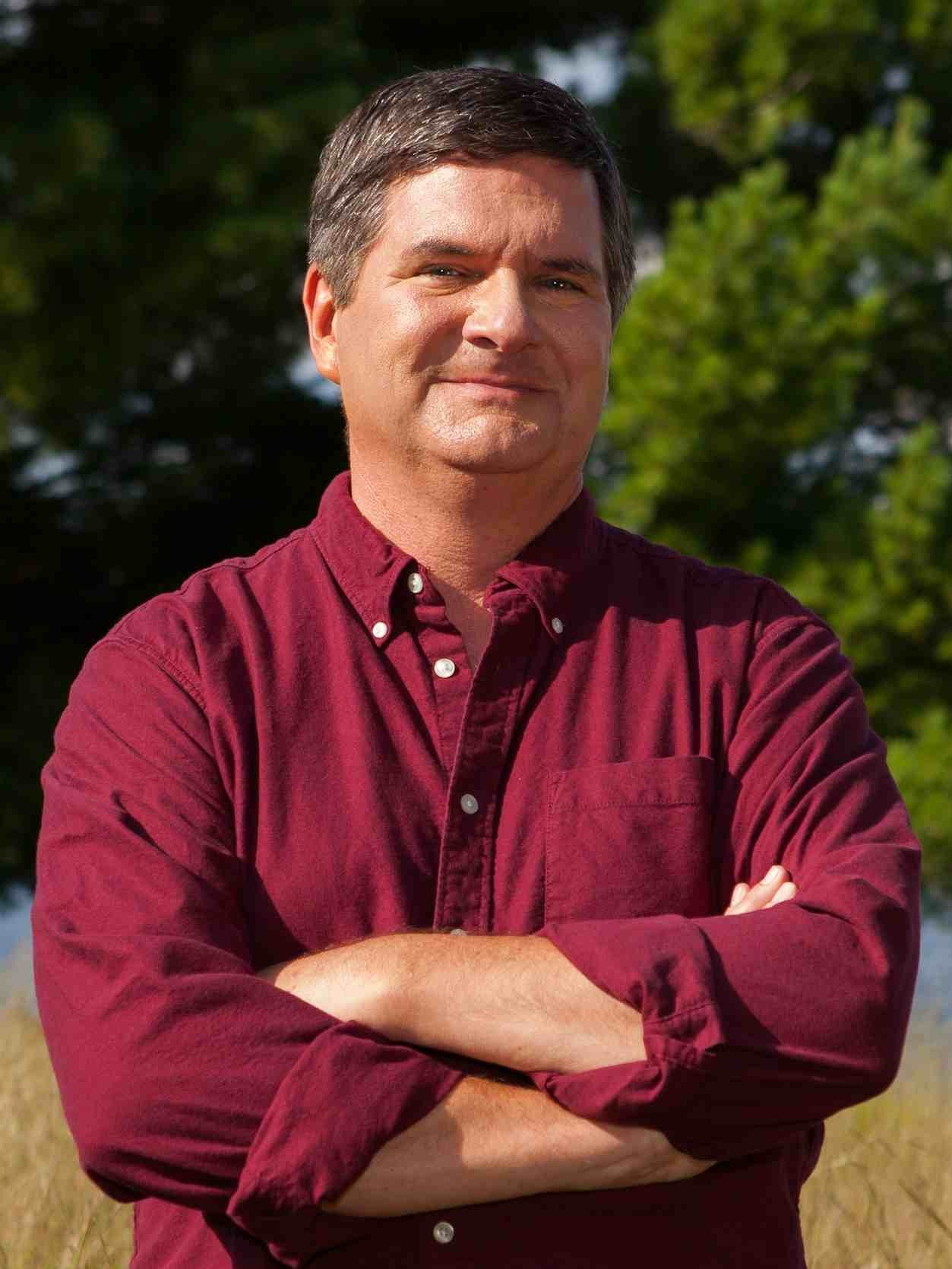
- Kreitlow in 2012

President pro tempore of the Wisconsin Senate
- In office January 5, 2009 – January 3, 2011
- Preceded by: Tim Carpenter
- Succeeded by: Joe Leibham

Member of the Wisconsin Senate from the 23rd district
- In office January 3, 2007 – January 3, 2011
- Preceded by: David Zien
- Succeeded by: Terry Moulton

Personal details
- Born: July 3, 1964 (age 62) Saint Paul, Minnesota, U.S.
- Party: Democratic
- Spouse: Sharry Fritsch
- Education: University of Wisconsin, Eau Claire (BA)

Patrick J. Kreitlow (born July 3, 1964) is an American politician, former broadcaster, and communications consultant. A Democrat, Kreitlow was a member of the Wisconsin State Senate, representing Wisconsin's 23rd Senate district, from 2007 to 2011. In November 2008, Kreitlow was elected President pro tempore of the Wisconsin State Senate. He was defeated for reelection in 2010 by Terry Moulton. Kreitlow ran for Wisconsin's 7th congressional district seat in the 2012 election against incumbent Sean Duffy, who was reelected.

== Early life, education, and journalism career ==
Born in 1964 in Saint Paul, Minnesota to parents Joan and Jerry Kreitlow, Kreitlow graduated from Apple Valley High School in 1982, then attended the University of Wisconsin-Eau Claire, where he graduated with a B.A. in Journalism in 1986. He and his wife, Sharry, have two daughters, Samantha and Chelsea.

Kreitlow is a former journalist, having worked at WAXX-FM/WAYY and other radio stations. He joined the news department of WEAU-TV in the mid-1990s, becoming the 6pm anchor and 10pm co-anchor in 1998. Kreitlow left WEAU-TV in May 2005. He also served as the president of the Western Wisconsin Press Club.

== Wisconsin Senate ==
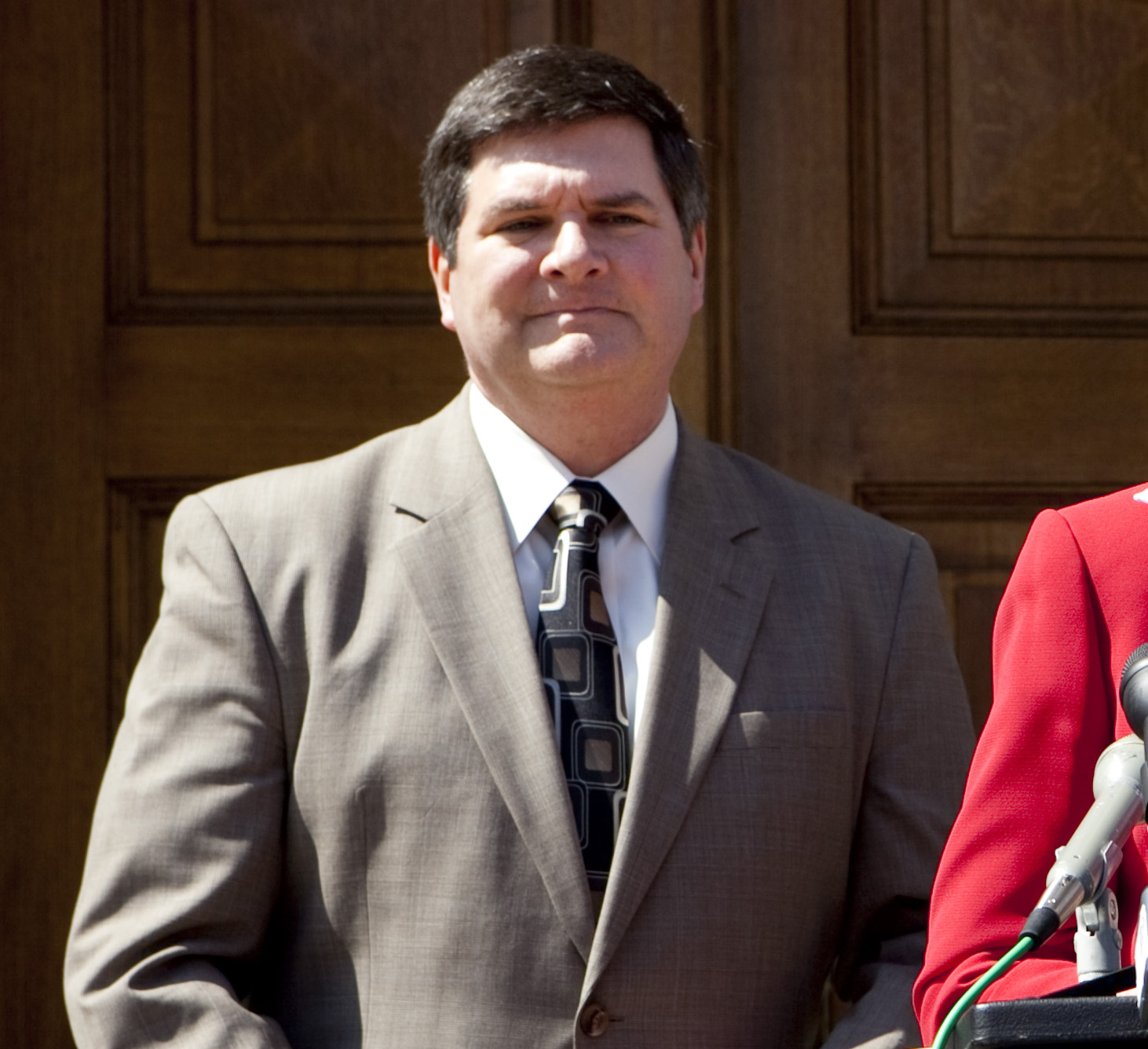
Kreitlow in 2009

=== Elections ===
2006

Kreitlow was elected to the Wisconsin State Senate in 2006, defeating 17-year incumbent Republican State Senator David Zien 51%-49%, a difference of just 1,096 votes.

2010

In May 2010, numerous news sources mentioned Kreitlow as a possible candidate for the open United States House of Representatives seat from Wisconsin's 7th congressional district following the retirement of Congressman Dave Obey. He later declined to enter the race and endorsed Democratic State Senator Julie Lassa in her run for the seat.

On November 2, 2010, Terry Moulton, a former member of the Wisconsin State Assembly, defeated Kreitlow 54%-46%.

=== Tenure ===
Kreitlow delivered the 2010 Senate Democratic response to Wisconsin Governor Jim Doyle's State of the State Address. In November 2009, along with Senators Julie Lassa and Jon Erpenbach, Kreitlow announced the Senate Democrats CORE business growth initiative.

=== Committee assignments ===
During his tenure, he served on the Campaign Finance Reform, Rural Issues and Information Technology, Economic Development, Job Creation, Family Prosperity and Housing, Education; Ethics Reform and Government Operations; and Public Health, Senior Issues, Long Term Care and Privacy committees. Kreitlow served as chair of the committee on Rural Issues and Information Technology and the Special Committee on Domestic Bio-fuels.

== 2012 congressional election ==
Kreitlow ran for Wisconsin's 7th Congressional district seat in the November 2012 election. The incumbent representative, Sean Duffy, was reelected.

== 2018 gubernatorial election ==
Kreitlow served as the senior advisor to candidate for Governor of Wisconsin Dana Wachs.

Wisconsin Senate
Preceded by David Zien	Member of the Wisconsin Senate from the 23rd district 2007–2011	Succeeded by Terry Moulton
Preceded by Tim Carpenter	President pro tempore of the Wisconsin Senate; 2009–2011	Succeeded by Joe Leibham
