= Dave Moulton =

Custom bicycle frame builder (1936–2025)

Edward David Moulton (8 February 1936 – 4 May 2025) was a British custom bicycle frame builder and internet blogger based in the United States.

Dave Moulton studied at Luton Technical College in England and learned bicycle frame building from Albert "Pop" Hodge in Luton, beginning in 1957. He opened a frame-building business around 1975 in Worcester, England. In 1976, Paul Carbutt rode one of Moulton's bicycles in the Olympics in Montreal, Quebec, Canada. The bike frames were marked with Moulton's name, "Dave Moulton" in large lower-case letters.

Moulton began receiving orders from the United States due to the increasing popularity of cycling as a sport and the scarcity of master frame-builders there. In 1979 Moulton emigrated to the United States and went to work for Vic and Mike Fraysse in Ridgefield Park, New Jersey. He built bicycles for them under the Paris Sport brand that were used by the US Olympic Cycling Team. In 1980 he went to work for Masi Bicycles in California until 1981. Shortly thereafter he rented space from Masi to resume the frame-building business under his own name. By 1983 he was doing well enough to move his business to a stand-alone location in San Marcos, California. That year he went into partnership with Olympic cyclist John Howard and manufactured bicycle frames under the John Howard name until 1984. In 1984 he began making frames under the Fuso label (Fuso is the Italian word for Molten), and, between 1985 and 1987, a small number under the Recherché label. The bicycles sold from US$1,500 to $3,000 in the late 1980s.

Moulton retired from frame building in 1993. However, many of his bicycles are still in use. Moulton's bicycles have been ridden in more than 20 world championships, in major races including the Tour de France, and in Olympic events. The business was taken over by his former apprentice, Russ Denny, who still manufactures his own frames, plus under the Fuso name.

Moulton retired to Easley, South Carolina and become a published author and songwriter. He published his first book in 2003, Prodigal Child. (ISBN 0-9726693-4-5)

Moulton died on 4 May 2025, at the age of 89.
