= 2012 Wisconsin lieutenant gubernatorial recall election =

- June 5, 2012
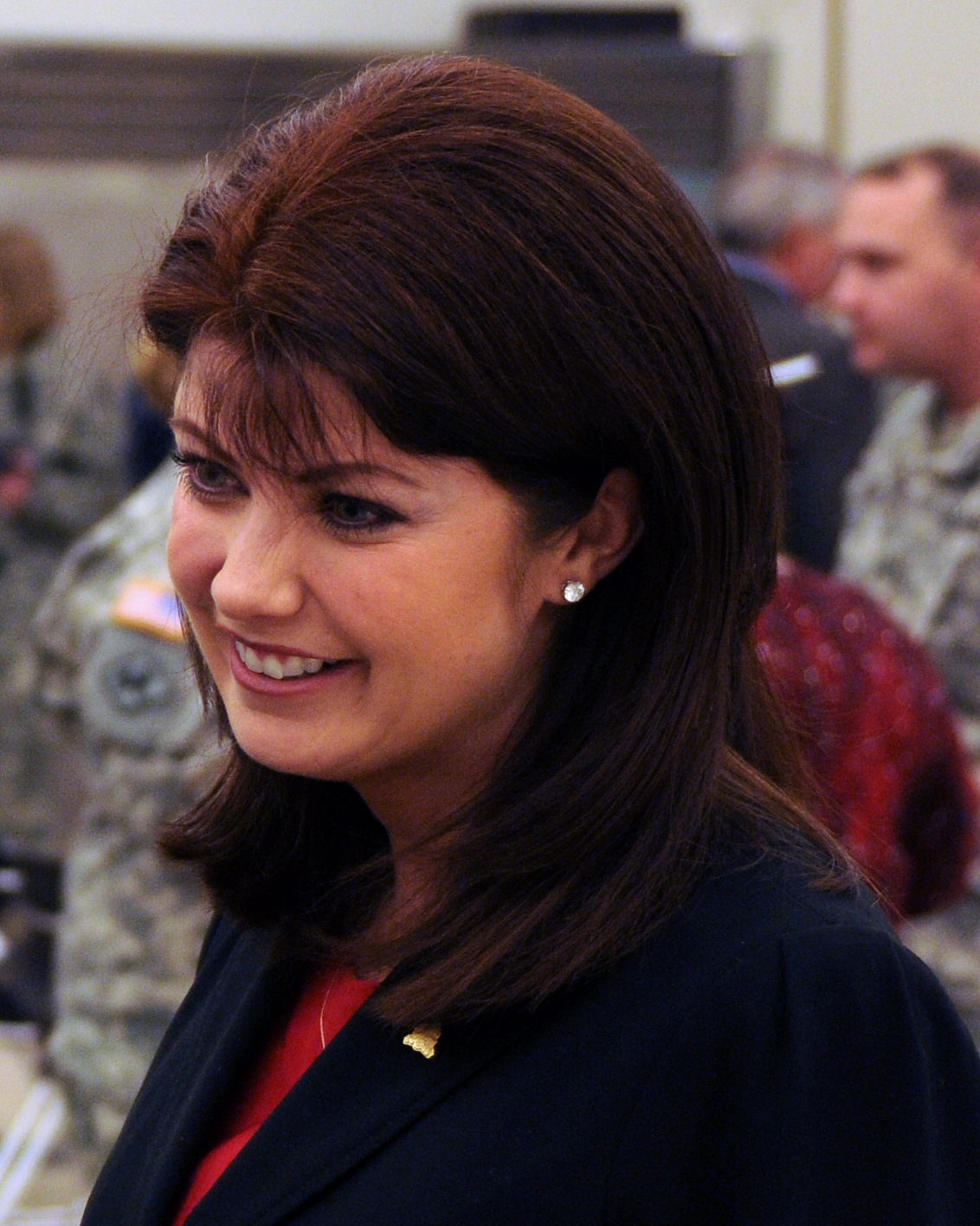

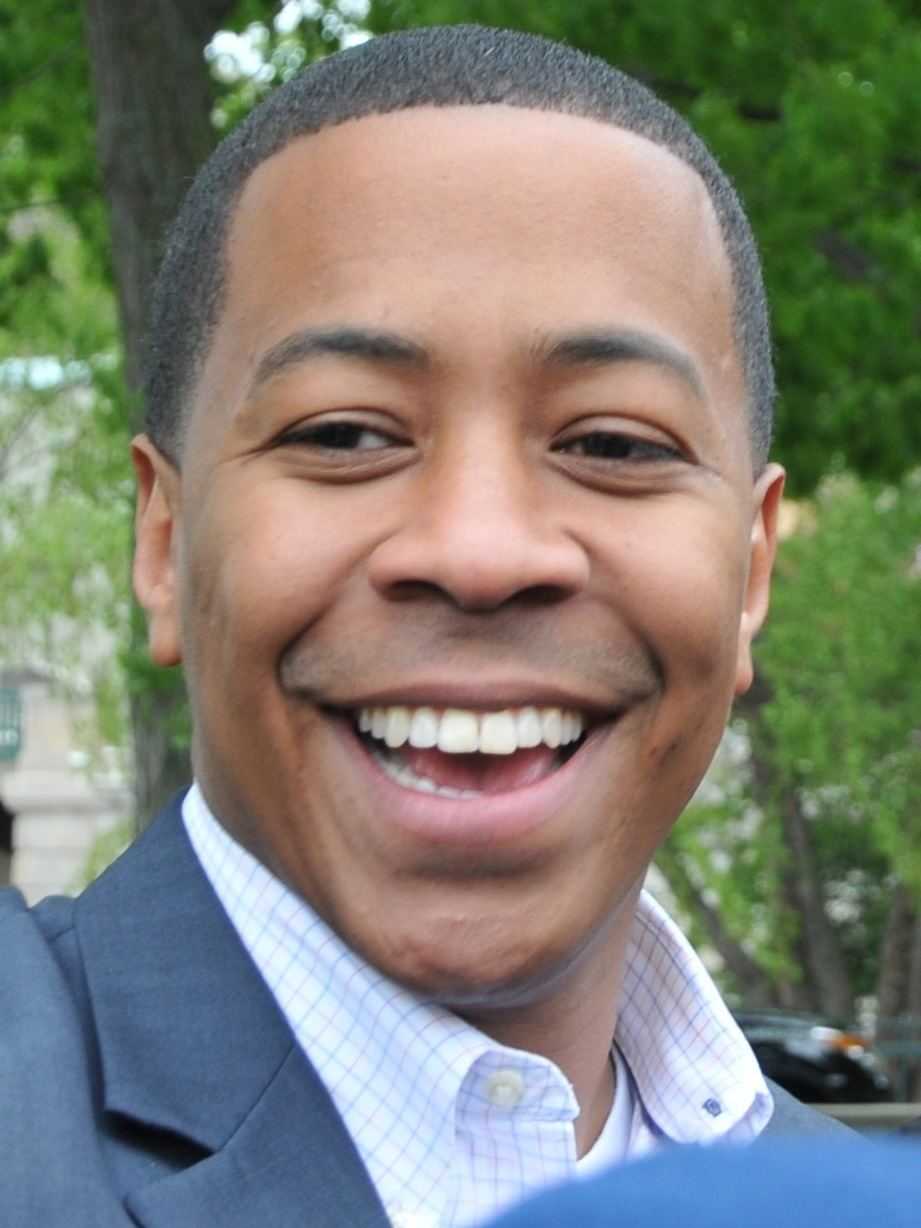
Nominee	Rebecca Kleefisch	Mahlon Mitchell
Party	Republican	Democratic
Popular vote	1,301,739	1,156,520
Percentage	52.89%	46.99%
- County results Kleefisch: 50–60% 60–70% 70–80% Mitchell: 50–60% 60–70% 70–80%
Lieutenant Governor before election
Rebecca Kleefisch
Republican
Elected Lieutenant Governor
Rebecca Kleefisch
Republican

The 2012 Wisconsin lieutenant gubernatorial recall election was held on June 5, 2012 to decide whether to retain or recall the lieutenant governor of Wisconsin. Voters decided to retain incumbent Republican lieutenant governor Rebecca Kleefisch over recalling her in favor of the Democratic candidate Mahlon Mitchell. Kleefisch's retention made her the first lieutenant governor in U.S. history to run in and survive a recall. Primary elections took place on May 8, 2012.

== Background ==
=== Gubernatorial succession ===
The lieutenant governor is established within Article V of the Wisconsin Constitution as the first person in the line of succession of Wisconsin's executive branch, and serves as governor in the event of the death, resignation, removal, impeachment, absence from the state, or incapacity due to illness of the governor of Wisconsin.

Gubernatorial succession came into focus during the recall, as under Wisconsin law, the lieutenant governor is "acting governor" whenever the governor leaves the state. This arrangement, paired with the recall election, could have led to a scenario where the governor was of one party, and the lieutenant governor was of another party.

While acting as governor, the lieutenant governor has all the powers of the governor, though the impacts would be limited as the governor, upon their return, can immediately reverse any actions taken in their absence.

Despite speculation, such a scenario never came to pass as Kleefisch won re-election by 5.9%.

=== 2012 Wisconsin gubernatorial recall election ===
Despite holding an office with little to no actual power, serving an almost entirely ceremonial purpose, Kleefisch faced similar anger from Wisconsinites regarding her role in Walker's efforts to weaken collective bargaining rights. Similar to Walker, Kleefisch had low favorability ratings, with one Marquette poll leaving her around 25% favorability, compared with 31% unfavorability.

== Republican primary ==
- As Kleefisch was the incumbent being recalled, the Republican Party did not hold a primary for this race.

== Democratic primary ==
=== Campaign ===
Similarly to Gladys Huber in the Democratic gubernatorial primary, in this primary, the Republican Party supported a "placeholder" candidate, Isaac Weix, a perennial candidate who had previously ran in the 10th Senate district's Democratic recall election primary. The purpose of Weix running was to force Democrats to hold a recall primary for lieutenant governor and give Republicans more time to campaign for the general election. Democrats also opposed Weix on the grounds they felt that such candidates would only confuse voters.

=== Candidates ===
==== Nominee ====
- Mahlon Mitchell, firefighter, president of the Professional Fire Fighters of Wisconsin

==== Eliminated in primary ====
- Ira Robins, private investigator
- Isaac Weix, candidate for the 10th senate district in the 2011 recalls

==== Declined ====
- Cory Mason, State Representative from the 62nd district (2007–2013)

=== Results ===
Primary results by county: Mitchell: 40–50%; 50–60%; 60–70%; Weix: 30–40%; 40–50%

Democratic primary results
Party	Candidate	Votes	%
Democratic	Mahlon Mitchell	396,302	52.23%
Democratic	Isaac Weix	197,148	25.98%
Democratic	Ira Robins	165,325	21.79%
Total votes		758,775	100.0

== General election ==
=== Results ===
2012 Wisconsin lieutenant governor recall election results
Party	Candidate	Votes	%
Republican	Rebecca Kleefisch (incumbent)	1,301,739	52.9
Democratic	Mahlon Mitchell	1,156,520	47.1
Total votes		2,458,259	100.0
Republican hold			
