= Terry Moulton =

American politician

Member of the Wisconsin Senate from the 23rd district
- In office January 3, 2011 – January 7, 2019
- Preceded by: Pat Kreitlow
- Succeeded by: Kathy Bernier

Member of the Wisconsin State Assembly from the 68th district
- In office January 3, 2005 – January 5, 2009
- Preceded by: Larry Balow
- Succeeded by: Kristen Dexter

Personal details
- Born: July 19, 1946 (age 80) Whitefish, Montana
- Party: Republican
- Spouse: Sue Kay
- Profession: small business owner

Terry Moulton (born July 19, 1946) is a former Republican member of the Wisconsin Senate, who represented the 23rd district from 2011 to 2019. He was previously a member of the Wisconsin Assembly, representing the 68th district from 2005 to 2009. In March 2018, Moulton announced that he would be retiring from the senate and was endorsing Representative Kathy Bernier to be his successor.

== Early life, education and career ==
Born in Whitefish, Montana, Terry moved to Chippewa Falls, Wisconsin, with his family when he was two years old. He grew up on the shores of Little Lake Wissota and spent most of his life in the Chippewa Valley.

For over two decades, Moulton has owned and operated Mouldy's Archery and Tackle in Lake Hallie. He founded Mouldy's Tackle Company, which manufactures the muskie lure, the "Hawg Wobbler". Before opening his businesses, Moulton worked for 17 years in administration at St. Joseph's Hospital in Chippewa Falls.

== Wisconsin legislature ==
=== State Assembly ===
Moulton was elected in 2004 to the Wisconsin State Assembly, representing Assembly District 68. Serving as vice-chair of the Natural Resources Committee, Moulton lobbied and fought the Department of Natural Resources over deer management practices and increased opportunities for youth in hunting and fishing. As Chair of the Small Business Committee, Moulton worked to push for tax policies targeted at increasing investment in Wisconsin's economy and expanding research and development.

In 2008, Moulton was defeated for re-election by Altoona school board member Kristen Dexter.

=== State Senate ===
In late 2009, Moulton ran for the Wisconsin State Senate in Senate District 23, challenging incumbent Democrat Pat Kreitlow of Chippewa Falls. On November 2, 2010, Moulton defeated Kreitlow for the senate seat. He began his term on January 3, 2011.

=== 2012 Recall ===
Moulton faced a recall election on June 5 against Kristen Dexter who defeated James Engel in the Democratic primary on May 8, 2012. Supporters of the recall submitted over 21,000 signatures on January 17, 2012. The Wisconsin Government Accountability Board voted unanimously on March 12 to order the recall, determining that at least 18,657 of the signatures were valid.

== Personal life ==
Moulton and his wife, Sue Kay, have two children and eight grandchildren.
