= John Lehman (Wisconsin politician) =

American educator and politician (born 1945)

John W. Lehman
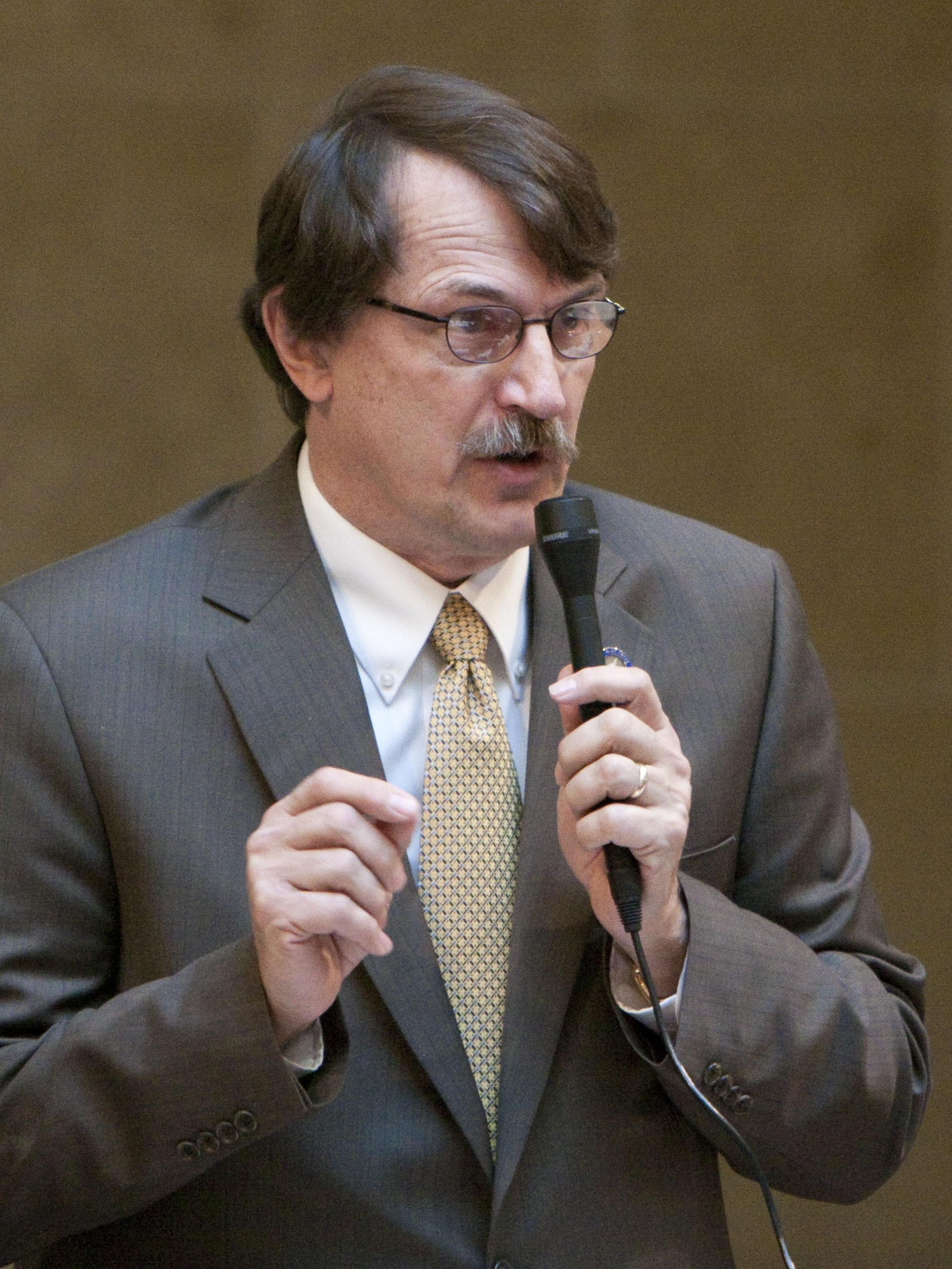
- Lehman in 2009

Member of the Wisconsin Senate from the 21st district
- In office July 16, 2012 – January 5, 2015
- Preceded by: Van Wanggaard
- Succeeded by: Van Wanggaard
- In office January 3, 2007 – January 3, 2011
- Preceded by: Cathy Stepp
- Succeeded by: Van Wanggaard

Member of the Wisconsin State Assembly from the 62nd district
- In office January 6, 1997 – January 3, 2007
- Preceded by: Kimberly Plache
- Succeeded by: Cory Mason

Member of the Racine City Council
- In office 1988–2000

Personal details
- Born: August 2, 1945 (age 81) Rhinelander, Wisconsin, U.S.
- Party: Democratic
- Spouse: Catherine A. Lehman
- Education: Luther College; Carthage College

John W. Lehman (born August 2, 1945) is an American educator and politician from Racine, Wisconsin. Lehman represented the 21st District in the Wisconsin Senate from 2007 to 2011 and again from 2012 to 2015, and was the Democratic nominee for Lieutenant Governor of Wisconsin in 2014. Previously, Lehman was a member of the Wisconsin State Assembly from 1997 through 2007. Elected as a state senator in 2006 but unseated in 2010, Lehman retook his old seat in the 2012 Wisconsin recall elections, defeating the incumbent, Van Wanggaard, who won the seat back in the 2014 general election.

== Background ==
Born in Rhinelander, Wisconsin, Lehman graduated from Washington Park High School in Racine, Wisconsin. He received his bachelor's degree from Luther College and his master's degree from Carthage College. He also went to the University of Wisconsin–Madison and University of Wisconsin–Parkside. He taught history and economics at Washington Park High School.

== Political career ==
Lehman was elected to the Racine City Council in 1988. In 1996 he ran for and won election in the 62nd assembly district in a vacancy created when incumbent Kimberly Plache defeated 21st district state senator George Petak in a recall election. Lehman gave up his City Council seat in 2000. In 2006 the 21st state senate district was again an open seat, Lehman ran and defeated Republican Bill McReynolds. Lehman lost his senate seat in the 2010 wave election.

On January 31, 2012, Lehman announced he would run against Wanggaard in what then was "looking like" a probable recall election. He stated "we need a change in course in this state and we need it now" before a gathering of about 20 supporters at the Racine Public Library, where he made the announcement. He added that "we need real leadership in Madison." Volunteers and workers gathered more than 24,000 signatures to recall Wanggaard, one of four state Senators facing a recall along with the Republican Governor Scott Walker and the Republican Lieutenant Governor Rebecca Kleefisch.

Lehman claimed he was "not seeking payback" against Wanggaard for the 2010 election, but claimed Wanggaard had not represented Racine County well in the Senate. The Senate Minority Leader Mark F. Miller (D-Monona) stated that the Democrats "could not have done better" because "they" (meaning Lehman, state Rep. Donna Seidel, who would run against current Senator Pam Galloway in the Wausau district, and former state Rep. Kristen Dexter against Senator Terry Moulton in the Chippewa Falls district) "are folks that people have voted for before." On June 6, 2012, Lehman narrowly defeated Wangaard, giving Democrats a brief one vote majority in the Wisconsin State Senate.

On November 18, 2013, Lehman announced that he would not seek re-election, and instead launched a campaign for Lieutenant Governor in the 2014 Wisconsin gubernatorial election. On August 12, 2014, he won the Democratic nomination, defeating Mary Jo Walters. Lehman and his running-mate, gubernatorial candidate Mary Burke, lost the general election to incumbents Scott Walker and Rebecca Kleefisch.

In 2018, Lehman announced that he would run for election again for the open seat in the 62nd Assembly District, which had been redrawn in 2011 into a safe Republican district. Lehman was defeated by Racine Unified School Board President Robert Wittke in the 2018 general election.

== Electoral history ==
=== Wisconsin Assembly (1996-2004) ===
Wisconsin Assembly, 62nd District Election, 1996
Party	Candidate	Votes	%	±%
Primary Election
Democratic	John Lehman	1,625	32.81%	
Democratic	Susan Michetti	802	16.19%	
Republican	Joseph S. Clementi	787	15.89%	
Republican	James Turek	750	15.14%	
Republican	Joseph F. Karls	552	11.14%	
Democratic	Paul A. Miller	437	8.82%	
Democratic	Sonia Tellez	359	7.25%	
Republican	Stella A. Young	255	5.15%	
Libertarian	Jim Sewell	16	0.32%	
Constitution	Thomas Casper	10	0.20%	
Libertarian	Todd Mascaretti	0	0.00%	
Total votes		'4,953'	'100.0%'	
General Election
Democratic	John Lehman	10,765	53.48%	
Republican	Joseph S. Clementi	8,395	41.71%	
Constitution	Thomas Casper	512	2.54%	
Libertarian	Jim Sewell	457	2.27%	
Total votes		'20,129'	'100.0%'	
Democratic hold				

Wisconsin Assembly, 62nd District Election, 1998
Party	Candidate	Votes	%	±%
Primary Election
Democratic	John Lehman (Incumbent)	1,912	63.08%	
Republican	Joseph S. Clementi	1,119	36.92%	
Total votes		'3,031'	'100.0%'	
General Election
Democratic	John Lehman (Incumbent)	9,771	58.90%	+5.42%
Republican	Joseph S. Clementi	6,818	41.10%	−0.61%
Total votes		'16,589'	'100.0%'	
Democratic hold				

Wisconsin Assembly, 62nd District Election, 2000
Party	Candidate	Votes	%	±%
Primary Election
Democratic	John Lehman (Incumbent)	974	99.19%	
Constitution	Mark Duncan	8	0.81%	
Total votes		'982'	'100.0%'	
General Election
Democratic	John Lehman (Incumbent)	16,180	85.80%	+26.90%
Constitution	Mark Duncan	2,658	14.09%	
	Write-ins	20	0.11%	
Total votes		'18,858'	'100.0%'	+13.68%
Democratic hold				

Wisconsin Assembly, 62nd District Election, 2002
Party	Candidate	Votes	%	±%
Primary Election
Democratic	John Lehman (Incumbent)	3,867	99.43%	
Libertarian	Keith Deschler	22	0.57%	
Total votes		'3,889'	'100.0%'	
General Election
Democratic	John Lehman (Incumbent)	10,974	84.77%	−1.03%
Libertarian	Keith Deschler	1,945	15.03%	
	Write-ins	26	0.20%	
Total votes		'12,945'	'100.0%'	-31.36%
Democratic hold				

Wisconsin Assembly, 62nd District Election, 2004
Party	Candidate	Votes	%	±%
Primary Election
Democratic	John Lehman (Incumbent)	1,622	98.96%	
Libertarian	Keith Deschler	17	1.04%	
Total votes		'21,477'	'100.0%'	
General Election
Democratic	John Lehman (Incumbent)	19,282	89.55%	+4.78%
Libertarian	Keith Deschler	2,195	10.19%	−4.84%
	Write-ins	56	0.26%	
Total votes		'21,533'	'100.0%'	+66.34%
Democratic hold				

=== Wisconsin Senate (2006, 2010, 2012) ===
Wisconsin Senate, 21st District Election, 2006
Party	Candidate	Votes	%	±%
Primary Election
Democratic	John Lehman	5,972	55.84%	
Republican	Bill McReynolds	4,709	44.03%	
	Write-ins	13	0.12%	
Total votes		'10,681'	'100.0%'	
General Election
Democratic	John Lehman	31,737	53.03%	+3.89%
Republican	Bill McReynolds	28,069	46.90%	−3.78%
	Write-ins	38	0.06%	
Total votes		'59,844'	'100.0%'	+19.57%
Democratic gain from Republican				

Wisconsin Senate, 21st District Election, 2010
Party	Candidate	Votes	%	±%
Primary Election
Republican	Van Wanggaard	13,864	61.13%	
Democratic	John Lehman (incumbent)	5,317	23.45%	
Republican	Bob Gulan	3,475	15.32%	
	Write-ins	22	0.10%	
Total votes		'22,678'	'100.0%'	
General Election
Republican	Van Wanggaard	32,036	52.52%	+5.62%
Democratic	John Lehman (incumbent)	28,930	47.43%	−5.60%
	Write-ins	29	0.05%	
Total votes		'60,995'	'100.0%'	+5.60%
Republican gain from Democratic				

Wisconsin Senate, 21st District recall Election, 2012
Party	Candidate	Votes	%	±%
Primary Election
Democratic	John Lehman	20,284	67.80%	
Democratic	Tamra Varebrook	9,513	31.80%	
	Write-ins	122	0.41%	
Total votes		'29,919'	'100.0%'	
General Election
Democratic	John Lehman	36,358	50.53%	+3.10%
Republican	Van Wanggaard (incumbent)	35,539	49.39%	−3.13%
	Write-ins	58	0.08%	
Total votes		'71,955'	'100.0%'	+17.97%
Democratic gain from Republican				

=== Wisconsin Lieutenant Governor (2014) ===
Wisconsin Lieutenant Gubernatorial Primary Election, 2014
Party	Candidate	Votes	%	±%
Republican	Rebecca Kleefisch (incumbent)	228,864	46.58%	
Democratic	John Lehman	144,591	29.43%	
Democratic	Mary Jo Walters	116,518	23.71%	
	Write-ins	1,410	0.29%	
Total votes		'491,383'	'100.0%'	

Wisconsin Gubernatorial Election, 2014
Party	Candidate	Votes	%	±%
Republican	Scott Walker / Rebecca Kleefisch (incumbent)	1,259,031	52.26%	−0.82%
Democratic	Mary Burke / John Lehman	1,122,913	46.59%	+0.31%
Independent	Robert Burke / Joseph M. Brost	18,720	0.78%	
Independent	Dennis Fehr	7,530	0.31%	
	Write-ins	1,445	0.06%	
Total votes		'2,410,314'	'100.0%'	
Republican hold				

=== Wisconsin Assembly (2018) ===
Wisconsin Assembly, 62nd District Election, 2018
Party	Candidate	Votes	%	±%
Primary Election
Democratic	John Lehman	4,903	45.63%	
Republican	Robert Wittke	3,931	36.58%	
Republican	John Leiber	1,885	17.54%	
	Write-ins	26	0.24%	
Total votes		'10,745'	'100.0%'	
General Election
Republican	Robert Wittke	16,035	54.87%	
Democratic	John Lehman	13,161	45.04%	
	Write-ins	27	0.09%	
Total votes		'29,223'	'100.0%'	+29.75%
Republican hold				

Party political offices
Preceded by Mahlon Mitchell	Democratic nominee for Lieutenant Governor of Wisconsin; 2014	Succeeded by Mandela Barnes
