= 2014 Wisconsin gubernatorial election =

- November 4, 2014
- Turnout: 54.5% (▼3.3%)
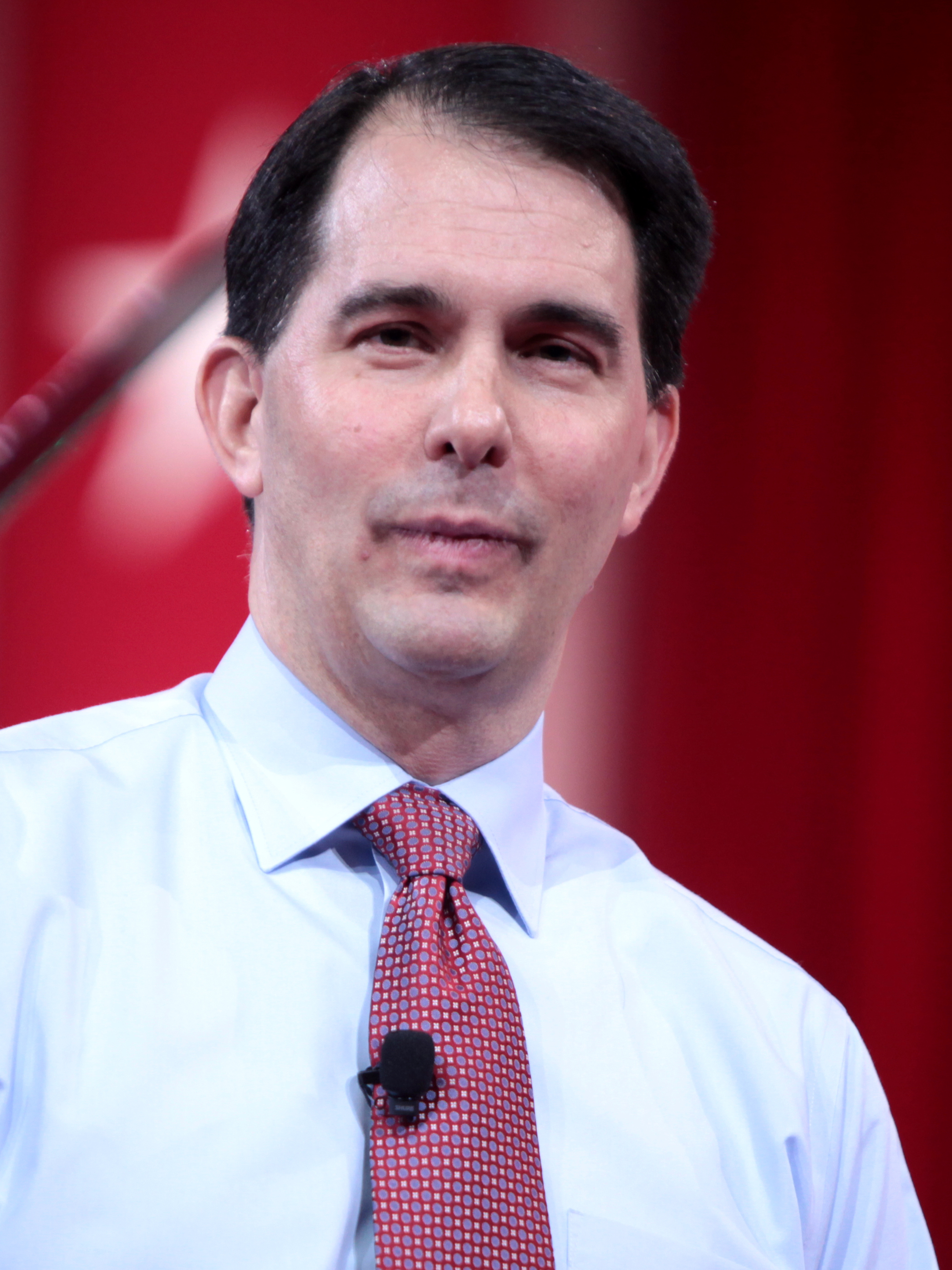

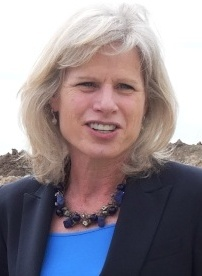
Nominee	Scott Walker	Mary Burke
Party	Republican	Democratic
Running mate	Rebecca Kleefisch	John Lehman
Popular vote	1,259,706	1,122,913
Percentage	52.26%	46.59%
- Walker: 50–60% 60–70% 70–80% Burke: 50–60% 60–70% 70–80%
Governor before election
Scott Walker
Republican
Elected Governor
Scott Walker
Republican

The 2014 Wisconsin gubernatorial election took place on November 4, 2014, to determine the governor and lieutenant governor of the U.S. state of Wisconsin. It occurred concurrently with elections to the United States Senate in other states, elections to the United States House of Representatives, and various state and local elections.

This was one of nine Republican-held governorships up for election in a state that Barack Obama won in the 2012 presidential election. Incumbent Republican governor Scott Walker won re-election to a second term in office, defeating Democratic businesswoman and Madison school board member Mary Burke and two minor party candidates in the general election.

Walker, who was elected in 2010, survived an attempted recall in 2012, the first governor in United States history to do so, defeating Democrat Tom Barrett both times. Wisconsin voters had elected a governor from a different political party than the sitting president in 27 of the last 31 elections since 1932; only once has a Democratic candidate been elected governor in Wisconsin in the last 18 contests when a Democrat was in the White House. Eleven of the last twelve Wisconsin governors, dating back to Republican Vernon Wallace Thomson in the late 1950s, had, unlike Burke, previously won an election to state government, the exception being Republican Lee S. Dreyfus in 1978.

The polling leading up to the election was very close, with no candidate clearly in the lead. The consensus among most analysts was that the race was either a tossup or leaning Republican. As of 2026, this is the last time a Republican was elected governor of Wisconsin, and the last time that a candidate was elected Governor of Wisconsin while winning a majority of counties.

== Republican primary ==
=== Governor ===
==== Candidates ====
- Scott Walker, incumbent governor

==== Results ====
Republican gubernatorial primary results
Party	Candidate	Votes	%
Republican	Scott Walker (incumbent)	238,715	99.42%
Republican	Steve R. Evans (write-in)	94	0.04%
Republican	Scattering	1,293	0.54%
Total votes		240,102	100.00%

=== Lieutenant governor ===
==== Candidates ====
- Rebecca Kleefisch, incumbent lieutenant governor

==== Results ====
Republican lieutenant gubernatorial primary results
Party	Candidate	Votes	%
Republican	Rebecca Kleefisch (incumbent)	228,864	99.69%
Republican	Scattering	704	0.31%
Total votes		229,568	100.00%

== Democratic primary ==
=== Governor ===
==== Candidates ====
- Mary Burke, businesswoman, member of the Madison school district board and former Wisconsin secretary of commerce
- Brett Hulsey, state representative

==== Disqualified ====
- Marcia Mercedes Perkins
- Hari Trivedi, independent candidate for governor in the 2012 recall election

==== Declined ====
- Chris Abele, Milwaukee County executive
- Peter W. Barca, minority leader of the Wisconsin State Assembly and former U.S. representative
- Tom Barrett, Mayor of Milwaukee and nominee for governor in 2010 and 2012
- Deb Carey, founder and president of New Glarus Brewing Company
- Dave Cieslewicz, former mayor of Madison
- Lori Compas, executive director of the Wisconsin Business Alliance and nominee for the Wisconsin Senate in 2012
- Kevin Conroy, biotechnology executive
- John Dickert, mayor of Racine
- Jon Erpenbach, state senator
- Kathleen Falk, former Dane County executive and candidate for governor in 2012
- Russ Feingold, former U.S. senator
- Dave Hansen, state senator
- Mark L. Harris, Winnebago County executive
- Dianne Hesselbein, state representative
- Sara Johann, political activist
- Steve Kagen, former U.S. representative
- Ron Kind, U.S. representative
- Jessica King, former state senator
- Herb Kohl, former U.S. senator
- Chris Larson, minority leader of the Wisconsin Senate
- Julie Lassa, state senator
- Cory Mason, state representative
- Mahlon Mitchell, president of the Professional Fire Fighters of Wisconsin and nominee for lieutenant governor in 2012
- Gwen Moore, U.S. representative
- Tom Nelson, Outagamie County Executive and nominee for lieutenant governor in 2010
- Dave Obey, former U.S. representative
- Joe Parisi, Dane County executive
- Jennifer Shilling, state senator
- Chris Taylor, state representative
- Kathleen Vinehout, state senator and candidate for governor in 2012

=== Endorsements ===
Mary Burke
- EMILY's List
- Planned Parenthood Advocates of Wisconsin
- Progressives United
- Wisconsin League of Conservation Voters

=== Polling ===
Poll source	Date(s) administered	Sample size	Margin of error	Mary Burke	Brett Hulsey	Marcia Mercedes Perkins	Hari Trivedi	Other	Undecided
Marquette University	May 15–18, 2014	?	± ?	66%	3%	1%	1%	—	24%

=== Results ===
Results by county Burke—>90% Burke—80–90% Burke—70–80%

Democratic gubernatorial primary results
Party	Candidate	Votes	%
Democratic	Mary Burke	259,926	83.28%
Democratic	Brett Hulsey	51,830	16.61%
Democratic	Scattering	350	0.11%
Total votes		312,106	100.00%

=== Lieutenant governor ===
==== Candidates ====
- John Lehman, member of Wisconsin Senate
- Mary Jo Walters

==== Results ====
Democratic lieutenant gubernatorial primary results
Party	Candidate	Votes	%
Democratic	John Lehman	144,591	55.24%
Democratic	Mary Jo Walters	116,518	44.52%
Democratic	Scattering	631	0.24%
Total votes		261,740	100.00%

== Minor parties ==
=== Candidates ===
==== Declared ====
- Robert Burke (Libertarian Party), founder of the Libertarian Party of Pierce-St. Croix

- Running mate: Joseph Brost

- Dennis Fehr (The People's Party), businessman and founder of The People's Party
- Brett Hulsey (write-in), state representative

==== Disqualified ====
- Francis Klein (Pirate Party)

== General election ==
=== Predictions ===
Source	Ranking	As of
The Cook Political Report	Tossup	November 3, 2014
Sabato's Crystal Ball	Lean R	November 3, 2014
Rothenberg Political Report	Tilt R	November 3, 2014
Real Clear Politics	Tossup	November 3, 2014

=== Polling ===
Poll source	Date(s) administered	Sample size	Margin of error	Scott Walker (R)	Mary Burke (D)	Other	Undecided
YouGov	October 25–31, 2014	1,494	± 3.4%	45%	43%	1%	11%
Public Policy Polling	October 28–30, 2014	1,814	± 3%	48%	47%	—	5%
Marquette University	October 23–26, 2014	1,164 LV	± 3%	50%	43%	1%	7%
Marquette University	October 23–26, 2014	1,409 RV	± 2.7%	46%	45%	1%	9%
CBS News/NYT/YouGov	October 16–23, 2014	3,308	± 3%	46%	45%	0%	10%
Rasmussen Reports	October 20–21, 2014	973	± 3%	48%	49%	1%	2%
WPR/St. Norbert College	October 18–21, 2014	525	± 4.4%	47%	46%	—	6%
Public Policy Polling	October 17–18, 2014	860	± ?	47%	46%	—	7%
Marquette University	October 9–12, 2014	803 LV	± 3.5%	47%	47%	0%	5%
Marquette University	October 9–12, 2014	1,004 RV	± 3.2%	48%	45%	1%	6%
Gravis Marketing	October 3–4, 2014	837	± 3%	50%	46%	—	4%
CBS News/NYT/YouGov	September 20–October 1, 2014	1,444	± 3%	48%	49%	0%	3%
Marquette University	September 25–28, 2014	585 LV	± 4.1%	51%	45%	1%	4%
Marquette University	September 25–28, 2014	801 RV	± 3.5%	46%	45%	1%	8%
Gravis Marketing	September 22–23, 2014	908	± 3%	45%	50%	—	4%
Rasmussen Reports	September 15–16, 2014	650	± 4%	48%	46%	3%	3%
Marquette University	September 11–14, 2014	589 LV	± 4.1%	49%	46%	1%	4%
Marquette University	September 11–14, 2014	800 RV	± 3.5%	46%	46%	1%	7%
CBS News/NYT/YouGov	August 18–September 2, 2014	1,473	± 4%	49%	45%	0%	5%
We Ask America	September 3, 2014	1,170 LV	± 3%	44%	48%	2%	6%
Marquette University	August 21–24, 2014	609 LV	± 4.1%	47%	49%	1%	4%
Marquette University	August 21–24, 2014	815 RV	± 3.5%	48%	44%	1%	8%
Rasmussen Reports	August 13–14, 2014	750	± 4%	48%	47%	—	5%
Gravis Marketing	July 31–August 2, 2014	1,346	± 3%	47%	47%	—	6%
CBS News/NYT/YouGov	July 5–24, 2014	1,968	± ?	47%	46%	1%	5%
Marquette University	July 17–20, 2014	549 LV	± 4.3%	46%	47%	1%	8%
Marquette University	July 17–20, 2014	804 RV	± 3.5%	46%	45%	1%	8%
Marquette University	May 15–18, 2014	805	± 3.5%	46%	46%	—	6%
Public Policy Polling	April 17–20, 2014	1,144	± 2.9%	48%	45%	—	7%
Magellan Strategies	April 14–15, 2014	851	± 3.36%	47%	47%	2%	4%
St. Norbert College	March 24–April 3, 2014	401	± 5%	55%	40%	—	5%
Marquette University	March 20–23, 2014	801	± 3.5%	48%	41%	—	11%
Gravis Marketing	March 17, 2014	988	± 4%	49%	44%	—	7%
Rasmussen Reports	March 10–11, 2014	500	± 4.5%	45%	45%	5%	5%
Marquette University	January 20–23, 2014	802	± 3.5%	47%	41%	—	8%
Marquette University	October 21–24, 2013	800	± 3.5%	47%	45%	—	8%
Public Policy Polling	September 13–16, 2013	1,180	± 2.9%	48%	42%	—	10%

Hypothetical polling

Poll source	Date(s) administered	Sample size	Margin of error	Scott Walker (R)	Jon Erpenbach (D)	Other	Undecided
Public Policy Polling	February 21–24, 2013	1,799	± 2.3%	48%	42%	—	9%

Poll source	Date(s) administered	Sample size	Margin of error	Scott Walker (R)	Russ Feingold (D)	Other	Undecided
Public Policy Polling	February 21–24, 2013	1,799	± 2.3%	47%	49%	—	4%

Poll source	Date(s) administered	Sample size	Margin of error	Scott Walker (R)	Mahlon Mitchell (D)	Other	Undecided
Public Policy Polling	February 21–24, 2013	1,799	± 2.3%	48%	39%	—	13%

Poll source	Date(s) administered	Sample size	Margin of error	Scott Walker (R)	Brett Hulsey (D)	Other	Undecided
Marquette University	May 15–18, 2014	805	± 3.5%	48%	39%	—	13%

Poll source	Date(s) administered	Sample size	Margin of error	Scott Walker (R)	Steve Kagen (D)	Other	Undecided
Public Policy Polling	February 21–24, 2013	1,799	± 2.3%	48%	41%	—	11%

Poll source	Date(s) administered	Sample size	Margin of error	Scott Walker (R)	Tom Nelson (D)	Other	Undecided
Public Policy Polling	September 13–16, 2013	1,180	± 2.9%	47%	40%	—	12%

Poll source	Date(s) administered	Sample size	Margin of error	Scott Walker (R)	Ron Kind (D)	Other	Undecided
Public Policy Polling	February 21–24, 2013	1,799	± 2.3%	46%	42%	—	11%

Poll source	Date(s) administered	Sample size	Margin of error	Scott Walker (R)	Kathleen Vinehout (D)	Other	Undecided
Marquette University	October 21–24, 2013	800	± 3.5%	47%	44%	—	9%
Public Policy Polling	September 13–16, 2013	1,180	± 2.9%	47%	41%	—	10%

Poll source	Date(s) administered	Sample size	Margin of error	Scott Walker (R)	Peter W. Barca (D)	Other	Undecided
Marquette University	October 21–24, 2013	800	± 3.5%	48%	42%	—	10%
Public Policy Polling	September 13–16, 2013	1,180	± 2.9%	47%	43%	—	10%
Public Policy Polling	February 21–24, 2013	1,799	± 2.3%	48%	43%	—	9%

=== Results ===
2014 Wisconsin gubernatorial election
Party	Candidate	Votes	%	±%
Republican	Scott Walker (incumbent)	1,259,706	52.26%	−0.82%
Democratic	Mary Burke	1,122,913	46.59%	+0.31%
Independent	Robert Burke	18,720	0.78%	
Independent	Dennis Fehr	7,530	0.31%	
Independent	Mary Jo Walters (write-in)	108	0.00%	
Independent	Brett D. Hulsey (write-in)	52	0.00%	
Constitution	Jumoka A. Johnson (write-in)	15	0.00%	
Republican	Steve R. Evans (write-in)	9	0.00%	
Republican	Susan P. Resch (write-in)	8	0.00%	
Independent	Jessica Nicole Perry (write-in)	5	0.00%	
	Scattering	1,248	0.05%	
Majority		136,793	5.68%	
Total votes		2,410,314	100.00%	
Republican hold		Swing	-1.13%	

==== By county ====
County	Scott Walker Republican		Mary Burke Democratic		All Others Various		Margin		Total votes cast
County	#	%	#	%	#	%	#	%	Total votes cast
Adams	4,297	52.50%	3,762	45.96%	126	1.54%	535	6.54%	8,185
Ashland	2,333	35.53%	4,150	63.20%	83	1.26%	-1,817	-27.67%	6,566
Barron	9,696	57.89%	6,832	40.79%	221	1.32%	2,864	17.10%	16,749
Bayfield	3,075	38.33%	4,888	60.92%	60	0.75%	-1,813	-22.60%	8,023
Brown	58,408	58.24%	40,751	40.63%	1,132	1.13%	17,657	17.61%	100,291
Buffalo	3,169	57.58%	2,267	41.19%	68	1.24%	902	16.39%	5,504
Burnett	3,868	59.17%	2,615	40.00%	54	0.83%	1,253	19.17%	6,537
Calumet	14,086	65.17%	7,285	33.71%	243	1.12%	6,801	31.47%	21,614
Chippewa	13,765	56.17%	10,402	42.45%	339	1.38%	3,363	13.72%	24,506
Clark	7,409	65.04%	3,848	33.78%	134	1.18%	3,561	31.26%	11,391
Columbia	11,837	47.92%	12,527	50.72%	336	1.36%	-690	-2.79%	24,700
Crawford	2,974	47.41%	3,225	51.41%	74	1.18%	-251	-4.00%	6,273
Dane	73,676	29.18%	175,937	69.69%	2,856	1.13%	-102,261	-40.50%	252,469
Dodge	23,715	64.38%	12,732	34.56%	391	1.06%	10,983	29.81%	36,838
Door	8,160	53.79%	6,842	45.10%	168	1.11%	1,318	8.69%	15,170
Douglas	6,001	38.11%	9,590	60.91%	154	0.98%	-3,589	-22.79%	15,745
Dunn	8,229	53.02%	7,066	45.53%	225	1.45%	1,163	7.49%	15,520
Eau Claire	20,304	48.22%	21,239	50.44%	562	1.33%	-935	-2.22%	42,105
Florence	1,349	67.42%	629	31.43%	23	1.15%	720	35.98%	2,001
Fond du Lac	27,485	64.02%	15,014	34.97%	430	1.00%	12,471	29.05%	42,929
Forest	2,032	56.57%	1,511	42.07%	49	1.36%	521	14.50%	3,592
Grant	9,149	50.36%	8,704	47.91%	313	1.72%	445	2.45%	18,166
Green	7,193	46.90%	7,948	51.82%	197	1.28%	-755	-4.92%	15,338
Green Lake	5,336	67.77%	2,464	31.29%	74	0.94%	2,872	36.47%	7,874
Iowa	4,480	42.34%	5,937	56.12%	163	1.54%	-1,457	-13.77%	10,580
Iron	1,755	61.06%	1,085	37.75%	34	1.18%	670	23.31%	2,874
Jackson	3,812	50.52%	3,631	48.12%	102	1.35%	181	2.40%	7,545
Jefferson	21,443	59.96%	13,876	38.80%	443	1.24%	7,567	21.16%	35,762
Juneau	4,817	53.33%	4,080	45.17%	135	1.49%	737	8.16%	9,032
Kenosha	28,398	50.28%	27,367	48.45%	717	1.27%	1,031	1.83%	56,482
Kewaunee	5,676	62.14%	3,379	36.99%	79	0.86%	2,297	25.15%	9,134
La Crosse	22,321	46.10%	25,429	52.52%	672	1.39%	-3,108	-6.42%	48,422
Lafayette	3,191	51.05%	2,982	47.70%	78	1.25%	209	3.34%	6,251
Langlade	5,476	64.59%	2,921	34.45%	81	0.96%	2,555	30.14%	8,478
Lincoln	6,866	56.52%	5,104	42.02%	178	1.47%	1,762	14.50%	12,148
Manitowoc	21,044	61.83%	12,563	36.91%	426	1.25%	8,481	24.92%	34,033
Marathon	34,583	61.19%	21,305	37.70%	625	1.11%	13,278	23.50%	56,513
Marinette	9,610	60.87%	6,023	38.15%	155	0.98%	3,587	22.72%	15,788
Marquette	3,611	57.08%	2,629	41.56%	86	1.36%	982	15.52%	6,326
Menominee	215	21.52%	753	75.38%	31	3.10%	-538	-53.85%	999
Milwaukee	132,706	36.05%	231,316	62.84%	4,071	1.11%	-98,610	-26.79%	368,093
Monroe	8,446	55.98%	6,399	42.41%	243	1.61%	2,047	13.57%	15,088
Oconto	10,300	63.84%	5,657	35.06%	178	1.10%	4,643	28.78%	16,135
Oneida	9,852	56.90%	7,190	41.53%	272	1.57%	2,662	15.37%	17,314
Outagamie	44,543	59.43%	29,503	39.37%	899	1.20%	15,040	20.07%	74,945
Ozaukee	32,696	69.95%	13,696	29.30%	349	0.75%	19,000	40.65%	46,741
Pepin	1,791	56.62%	1,333	42.14%	39	1.23%	458	14.48%	3,163
Pierce	7,760	53.02%	6,666	45.54%	211	1.44%	1,094	7.47%	14,637
Polk	9,345	58.16%	6,516	40.55%	207	1.29%	2,829	17.61%	16,068
Portage	14,650	48.26%	15,283	50.34%	425	1.40%	-633	-2.09%	30,358
Price	3,725	57.29%	2,700	41.53%	77	1.18%	1,025	15.76%	6,502
Racine	42,944	53.96%	35,769	44.95%	868	1.09%	7,175	9.02%	79,581
Richland	3,435	50.25%	3,315	48.49%	86	1.26%	120	1.76%	6,836
Rock	24,993	42.76%	32,523	55.64%	932	1.59%	-7,530	-12.88%	58,448
Rusk	3,502	59.48%	2,286	38.82%	100	1.70%	1,216	20.65%	5,888
Sauk	12,222	47.73%	13,041	50.92%	346	1.35%	-819	-3.20%	25,609
Sawyer	3,721	54.51%	3,029	44.37%	76	1.11%	692	10.14%	6,826
Shawano	10,937	64.95%	5,730	34.03%	171	1.02%	5,207	30.92%	16,838
Sheboygan	31,728	63.16%	17,955	35.74%	549	1.09%	13,773	27.42%	50,232
St. Croix	20,066	59.44%	13,231	39.19%	463	1.37%	6,835	20.25%	33,760
Taylor	5,406	69.81%	2,248	29.03%	90	1.16%	3,158	40.78%	7,744
Trempealeau	5,617	52.34%	4,974	46.35%	140	1.30%	643	5.99%	10,731
Vernon	5,687	48.31%	5,932	50.40%	152	1.29%	-245	-2.08%	11,771
Vilas	6,942	61.34%	4,240	37.47%	135	1.19%	2,702	23.88%	11,317
Walworth	25,415	64.00%	13,809	34.77%	488	1.23%	11,606	29.23%	39,712
Washburn	3,945	55.63%	3,074	43.34%	73	1.03%	871	12.28%	7,092
Washington	50,278	75.88%	15,507	23.40%	478	0.72%	34,771	52.47%	66,263
Waukesha	147,266	72.46%	54,500	26.81%	1,482	0.73%	92,766	45.64%	203,248
Waupaca	13,130	63.13%	7,471	35.92%	197	0.95%	5,659	27.21%	20,798
Waushara	6,100	62.19%	3,609	36.79%	100	1.02%	2,491	25.40%	9,809
Winnebago	37,894	54.75%	30,258	43.72%	1,061	1.53%	7,636	11.03%	69,213
Wood	17,820	57.30%	12,861	41.35%	420	1.35%	4,959	15.94%	31,101
Total	1,259,706	52.26%	1,122,913	46.59%	27,695	1.15%	136,793	5.68%	2,410,314

Counties that flipped from Democratic to Republican

- Kenosha (largest city: Kenosha)

Counties that flipped from Republican to Democratic

- Crawford (largest municipality: Prairie du Chien)
- Eau Claire (largest municipality: Eau Claire)
- Green (largest municipality: Monroe)
- Sauk (largest city: Baraboo)
- Vernon (largest municipality: Viroqua)

==== By congressional district ====
Walker won six of eight congressional districts, including one that elected a Democrat.

District	Walker	Burke	Representative
1st	58.25%	40.73%	Paul Ryan
2nd	33.35%	65.51%	Mark Pocan
3rd	50.1%	48.52%	Ron Kind
4th	27.35%	71.65%	Gwen Moore
5th	67.64%	31.53%	Jim Sensenbrenner
6th	60.71%	38.17%	Glenn Grothman
7th	57.84%	40.98%	Sean Duffy
8th	60.16%	38.76%	Reid Ribble

== See also ==
- 2014 Wisconsin elections
