= Wisconsin's 61st Assembly district =

American legislative district in Milwaukee County, Wisconsin

Wisconsin's 61st State Assembly district
- 2024 map defined in 2023 Wisc. Act 94; 2022 map defined in Johnson v. Wisconsin Elections Commission; 2011 map was defined in 2011 Wisc. Act 43
Assemblymember
Bob Donovan; R–Greenfield
since January 6, 2025 (1 year, 52 days)
- Demographics: 80.33% White; 4.18% Black; 8.98% Hispanic; 4.9% Asian; 1.95% Native American; 0.1% Hawaiian/Pacific Islander
- Population (2020) • Voting age: 59,361; 47,545
- Website: Official website
- Notes: Southeast Wisconsin

The 61st Assembly district of Wisconsin is one of 99 districts in the Wisconsin State Assembly. Located in southeastern Wisconsin, the district comprises part of southwest Milwaukee County, including the villages of Greendale and Hales Corners, most of the city of Greenfield, and parts of southwest Milwaukee and northeast Franklin. The district is represented by Republican Bob Donovan, since January 2025; Donovan previously represented the 84th district from 2023 to 2025.

The 61st Assembly district is located within Wisconsin's 21st Senate district, along with the 62nd and 63rd Assembly Districts.

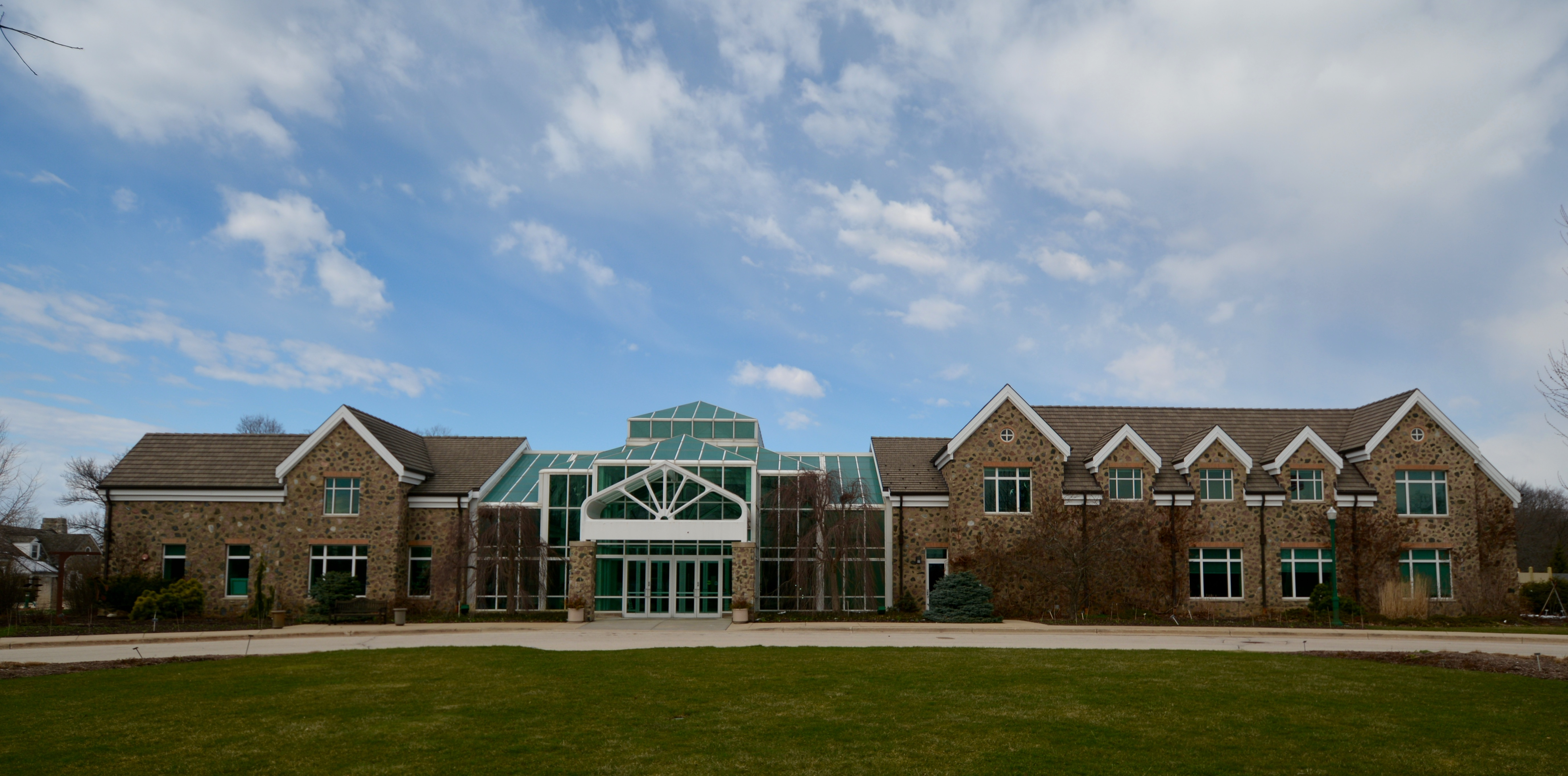
Boerner Botanical Gardens in Hales Corners

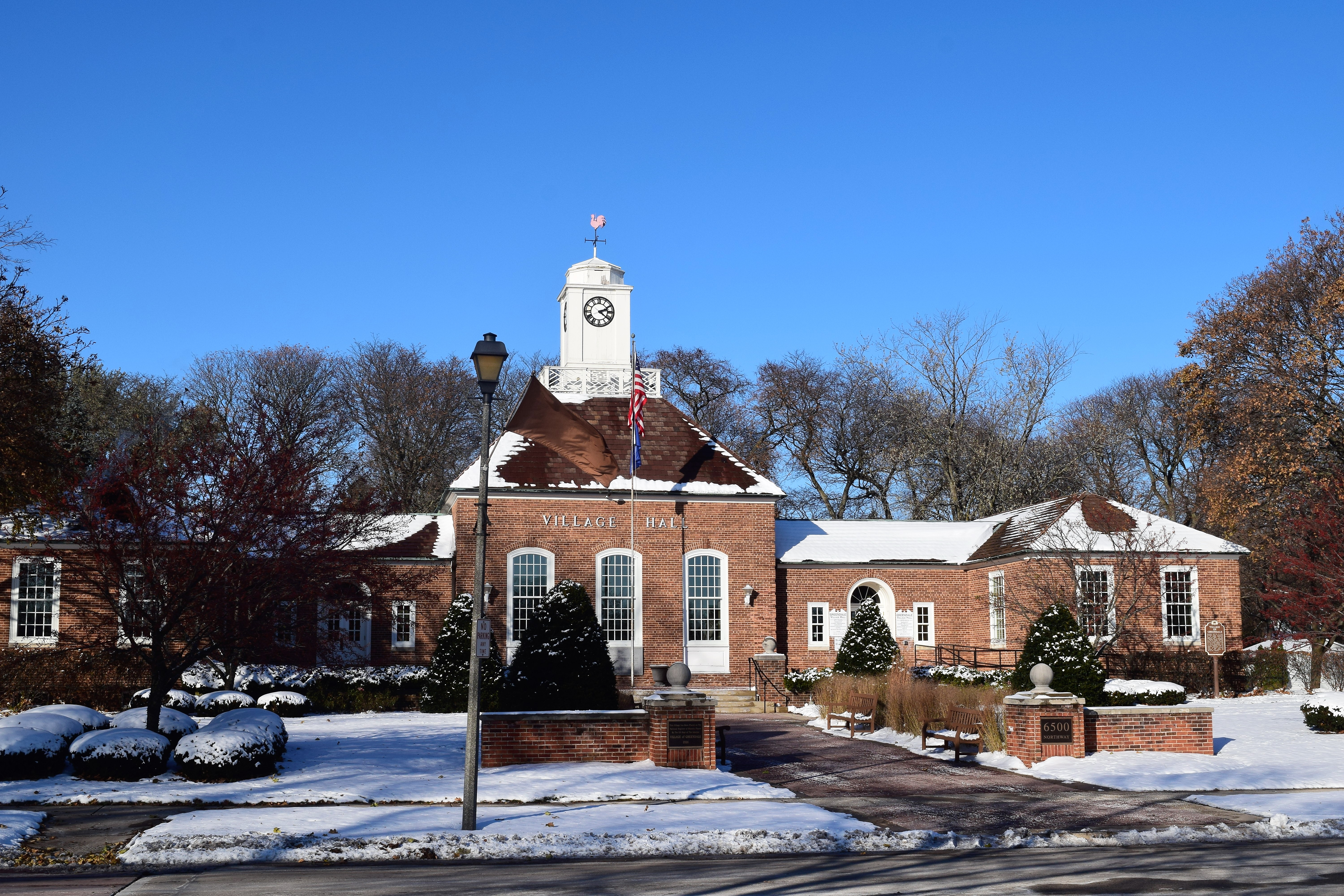
Greendale village hall

== History ==
The district was created in the 1972 redistricting act (1971 Wisc. Act 304) which first established the numbered district system, replacing the previous system which allocated districts to specific counties. The 61st district was drawn roughly in line with the boundaries of the previous Racine County 2nd district (the northern part of the city of Racine). The 61st district boundaries were relatively consistent in redistricting from 1972 to 2011, with the exception of the 1982 redistricting, which scrambled all State Assembly districts and moved the 61st district to north-central Wisconsin for the 1983–1984 legislative session. That changed with the controversial 2011 redistricting plan (2011 Wisc. Act 43) which moved the district to Kenosha County—the territory which had been covered by the 61st district was then split between the 62nd and 66th Assembly districts. This was part of a larger gerrymandering plan for the Racine and Kenosha County districts to convert one Assembly seat and one Senate seat from tossups to safely Republican.

The 2024 redistricting (2023 Wisc. Act 94) again dramatically reshaped the 21st Senate district, moving the 61st district from Kenosha County to southwest Milwaukee County. Most of the area previously covered by the 61st district became the bulk of the new 32nd Assembly district. Under the new map configuration, the 61st Assembly district is projected to be one of the most competitive districts in the state legislature.

== List of past representatives ==
List of representatives to the Wisconsin State Assembly from the 61st district
Member	Party	Residence	Counties represented	Term start	Term end	Ref.
District created
James F. Rooney	Dem.	Racine	Racine	January 1, 1973	January 3, 1983	
Sheehan Donoghue	Rep.	Merrill	Langlade, Lincoln, Marathon	January 3, 1983	January 7, 1985	
Scott C. Fergus	Dem.	Racine	Racine	January 7, 1985	July 1, 1990	
--Vacant--			Racine	July 1, 1990	January 7, 1991	
Robert L. Turner	Dem.	Racine	Racine	January 7, 1991	January 7, 2013	
Samantha Kerkman	Rep.	Randall	Kenosha	January 7, 2013	June 7, 2022	
--Vacant--			Kenosha	June 7, 2022	January 3, 2023	
Amanda Nedweski	Rep.	Pleasant Prairie	Kenosha	January 3, 2023	January 6, 2025	
Bob Donovan	Rep.	Greenfield	Milwaukee	January 6, 2025	Current	

== Electoral history ==
Year	Date	Elected				Defeated				Total	Plurality	Other primary candidates
1972	Nov. 7	James F. Rooney	Democratic	9,261	56.39%	Thomas C. Mortenson	Rep.	7,162	43.61%	16,423	2,099	Stanley N. Barry (Rep.); John A. Flanagan (Dem.); Curtis E. Sahakian (Dem.)
1974	Nov. 5	James F. Rooney (inc)	Democratic	5,881	57.82%	Anita M. Hunt	Rep.	4,291	42.18%	10,172	1,590	Betty S. Rowley (Dem.)
1976	Nov. 2	James F. Rooney (inc)	Democratic	12,309	94.72%	Gary Pederson	Amer.	686	5.28%	12,995	11,623	
1978	Nov. 7	James F. Rooney (inc)	Democratic	7,911	68.88%	Gary Pederson	Rep.	3,575	31.12%	11,486	4,336	
1980	Nov. 4	James F. Rooney (inc)	Democratic	10,724	65.06%	Earl W. Bell	Rep.	5,758	34.94%	16,482	4,966	
1982	Nov. 2	Sheehan Donoghue	Republican	8,377	50.80%	Frank Murphy	Dem.	8,112	49.20%	16,489	265	
1984	Nov. 6	Scott C. Fergus	Democratic	10,880	55.21%	Donald Walsh	Rep.	8,827	44.79%	19,707	2,053	William M. Frank (Dem.); Robert L. Turner (Dem.)
1986	Nov. 4	Scott C. Fergus (inc)	Democratic	7,575	58.88%	Norman T. Monson	Rep.	5,291	41.12%	12,866	2,284	Gwendolyn Wortock (Rep.)
1988	Nov. 8	Scott C. Fergus (inc)	Democratic	11,700	67.09%	Gwendolyn Wortock	Rep.	5,738	32.91%	17,438	5,962	
1990	Nov. 6	Robert L. Turner	Democratic	7,232	62.09%	Roderick D. Wilhelmi	Rep.	4,415	37.91%	11,647	2,817	Cathleen A. Cotter (Dem.); John Dickert (Dem.)
1992	Nov. 3	Robert L. Turner (inc)	Democratic	11,963	66.66%	Stella A. Young	Rep.	5,984	33.34%	17,947	5,979	
1994	Nov. 8	Robert L. Turner (inc)	Democratic	7,464	100.0%	--Unopposed--				7,464	7,464	
1996	Nov. 5	Robert L. Turner (inc)	Democratic	10,218	85.97%	Thomas Rivers	Tax.	904	7.61%	11,886	9,314	
1996	Nov. 5	Robert L. Turner (inc)	Democratic	10,218	85.97%	Michael L. Wynhoff	Lib.	764	6.43%	11,886	9,314	
1998	Nov. 3	Robert L. Turner (inc)	Democratic	9,515	100.0%	--Unopposed--				9,515	9,515	Ken Lumpkin (Dem.)
2000	Nov. 7	Robert L. Turner (inc)	Democratic	13,703	99.56%	--Unopposed--				13,763	13,643	
2002	Nov. 5	Robert L. Turner (inc)	Democratic	9,525	98.15%	--Unopposed--				9,705	9,345	John Dickert (Dem.)
2004	Nov. 2	Robert L. Turner (inc)	Democratic	17,173	89.49%	George Meyers	Lib.	1,980	10.32%	19,189	15,193	
2006	Nov. 7	Robert L. Turner (inc)	Democratic	11,431	99.06%	--Unopposed--				11,539	11,323	
2008	Nov. 4	Robert L. Turner (inc)	Democratic	16,267	87.71%	George Meyers	Lib.	2,242	12.09%	18,547	14,025	
2010	Nov. 2	Robert L. Turner (inc)	Democratic	10,026	81.96%	George Meyers	Lib.	2,167	17.71%	12,233	7,859	James DeMatthew (Dem.)
2012	Nov. 6	Samantha Kerkman	Republican	16,589	55.67%	John Steinbrink	Dem.	13,186	44.25%	29,798	3,403	
2014	Nov. 4	Samantha Kerkman (inc)	Republican	17,452	97.41%	--Unopposed--				17,916	16,988	
2016	Nov. 8	Samantha Kerkman (inc)	Republican	19,622	66.59%	Amee Janus	Dem.	9,792	33.23%	29,466	9,830	
2018	Nov. 6	Samantha Kerkman (inc)	Republican	16,606	61.87%	Gina Walkington	Dem.	10,207	38.03%	26,841	6,399	
2020	Nov. 3	Samantha Kerkman (inc)	Republican	28,254	96.26%	Steve Kundert (write-in)	Dem.	8	0.03%	29,352	27,164	
2022	Nov. 8	Amanda Nedweski	Republican	17,542	64.00%	Max Winkels	Dem.	9,851	35.94%	27,408	7,691	Mike Honold (Rep.)
