= Van H. Wanggaard =

American politician (born 1952)

Member of the Wisconsin Senate from the 21st district
- Incumbent
- Assumed office January 5, 2015
- Preceded by: John Lehman
- In office January 3, 2011 – July 11, 2012
- Preceded by: John Lehman
- Succeeded by: John Lehman

Member of the Board of Supervisors of Racine County, Wisconsin
- In office 2002–2011

Personal details
- Born: April 19, 1952 (age 74) Fort Leavenworth, Kansas, U.S.
- Party: Republican
- Spouse: Mary Jo Wanggaard
- Children: 2
- Education: Gateway Technical College
- Profession: Former investigator for the Racine Police Department
- Website: Official site

Van H. Wanggaard (born April 19, 1952) is a Republican politician and former law enforcement officer. He is a member of the Wisconsin State Senate, representing Wisconsin's 21st Senate district since 2015. He was previously elected to the same office in 2010, but was removed by recall election in June 2012. He previously served on the Racine County board of supervisors from 2002 to 2011.

== Early life and career ==
Born in Fort Leavenworth, Kansas, Wanggaard graduated from Racine Lutheran High School in 1970. He then graduated from Gateway Technical College with a certificate in Police Science Instruction. Wanggard also took course work at University of Wisconsin–Extension, University of Wisconsin–Parkside, Green Bay Technical College, Milwaukee Area Technical College, Racine Technical College, Gateway Technical College, Wisconsin State Patrol Academy, and the United States Coast Guard National SAR School. Wanggard also taught at Gateway Technical College.

Wanggaard worked for the Racine Police Department from 1972 to 2001 as an investigator. He and his wife have two children.

== Political career ==
Wanggaard was elected to the Racine County Board of Supervisors in 2002, a seat he held until he joined the State Senate in 2011.

In 2006, Wanggaard ran for the 62nd Wisconsin Assembly district but was defeated by future Racine Mayor Cory Mason.

In 2010, Wanggaard ran again for state legislative office, this time challenging incumbent Democrat John Lehman in the 21st senate district. This time Wanggaard was successful, winning the seat as part of the 2010 Republican wave election which saw Republicans flip 721 state legislative seats around the country.

Shortly after the 2010 election, the new unified Republican government attempted to pass a controversial budget restructuring. The bill was characterized as an assault on unions and public education, and led to senate recall elections in 2011 and 2012, as well as a recall election for the Governor, Scott Walker. Wanggaard was one of the 16 senators who faced recall elections, and was challenged by his defeated 2010 rival, former-senator John Lehman. Lehman defeated Wanggaard in the recall election held on June 5, 2012. This was the 2nd time that a senator serving in the 21st district had been successfully recalled, the first being George Petak in 1996.

After the 21st was redrawn into a safe Republican district, Lehman chose not to run for re-election in 2014, opting instead to seek the Democratic nomination for Lieutenant Governor of Wisconsin. Wanggaard sought and received the Republican nomination to reclaim the 21st senate district and defeated Democrat Randy Bryce in the general election.

As of 2018, Wanggaard is the Wisconsin Senate Majority Caucus Chair. He was re-elected in 2022, facing no opposition in the election.

Wanggaard's Senate district was significantly affected by the 2024 redistricting act. The new district removed all of Kenosha County, and most of the rural areas of Racine County, adding back the northern half of the city of Racine, and stretching north into the southwestern Milwaukee suburbs of Franklin, Greenfield, and Hales Corners. Under the new configuration, the 21st Senate district was projected to be one of the most highly-competitive districts in the state. Shortly after the redistricting act was signed, rumors began to swirl about Wanggaard's retirement. In January 2026, Wanggaard's fundraising disclosures revealed that he had not been actively raising money in 2025. He announced on March 17, 2026, that he would not run for re-election in 2026.

== Electoral history ==
=== Wisconsin Assembly (2006) ===
Year	Election	Date	Elected				Defeated				Total	Plurality
2006	General	Nov. 7	Cory Mason	Democratic	10,302	52.37%	Van H. Wanggaard	Rep.	9,363	47.60%	19,671	939

=== Wisconsin Senate (2010–2022) ===
Year	Election	Date	Elected				Defeated				Total	Plurality
2010	Primary	Sep. 12	Van Wanggaard	Republican	13,864	79.89%	Bob Gulan	Rep.	3,475	20.03%	17,353	10,389
2010	General	Nov. 2	Van Wanggaard	Republican	32,036	52.52%	John W. Lehman (inc)	Dem.	28,930	47.43%	60,995	3,106
2012	Recall	June 5	John W. Lehman	Democratic	36,358	50.53%	Van Wanggaard (inc)	Rep.	35,539	49.39%	71,955	819
2014	Primary	Aug. 12	Van Wanggaard	Republican	10,563	71.05%	Jonathan Steitz	Rep.	4,293	28.88%	14,866	6,270
2014	General	Nov. 4	Van Wanggaard	Republican	44,967	61.42%	Randy Bryce	Dem.	28,106	38.39%	73,213	16,861
2014	General	Nov. 4	Van Wanggaard	Republican	44,967	61.42%	Bill Thompkins (write-in)	Ind.	34	0.05%	73,213	16,861
2018	General	Nov. 6	Van Wanggaard (inc)	Republican	48,603	58.01%	Lori Hawkins	Dem.	35,111	41.91%	83,783	13,492
2022	General	Nov. 8	Van Wanggaard (inc)	Republican	61,621	94.14%	--unopposed--				65,459	57,783

Wisconsin Senate
Preceded by John Lehman	Member of the Wisconsin Senate from the 21st district January 3, 2011 – July 11, 2012	Succeeded by John Lehman
Preceded by John Lehman	Member of the Wisconsin Senate from the 21st district January 5, 2015 – present	Incumbent
