= Richard Burke (businessman) =

Entrepreneur

- Born: June 4, 1934; Chicago, Illinois
- Died: March 9, 2008 (aged 73); Milwaukee, Wisconsin
- Education: Marquette University
- Known for: Founder of Trek Bicycle Corporation
- Spouses: Elaine Sachs; Camille
- Children: 2 (including Mary Burke)

Richard (Dick) Burke (June 4, 1934 – March 9, 2008) was the co-founder of Trek Bicycle Corporation. Trek is known among cyclists for making the bikes that Lance Armstrong rode in his Tour de France victories.

== Early history ==
Burke was born in Chicago in 1934 and moved to Milwaukee when he enrolled at Marquette University. After graduating, he worked for several companies including an appliance distribution business.

== Trek Bicycle ==
In December, 1975, Richard (Dick) Burke and Bevil Hogg established Trek Bicycle as a wholly owned subsidiary of Roth Corporation, a Milwaukee-based appliance distributor. In early 1976, with a payroll of five, Trek started manufacturing steel touring frames in Waterloo, Wisconsin, taking aim at the mid to high-end market dominated by Japanese and Italian made models.

== Family ==
Burke is survived by his wife Camille, five children and nine grandchildren.

Two of his children are John Burke, the current president of the company he founded, as well as Mary Burke a former executive at Trek Bicycle Corporation and Democratic candidate for Governor of Wisconsin in the 2014 election.

Mr. Burke’s first marriage, to Elaine Sachs, ended in divorce. Besides his son, of Madison, Wis., Mr. Burke is survived by his wife, Camille; four daughters, Mary Burke; Kathleen Seiberlich, Michele Deubel, and Sharon Jonas; a stepbrother, Mike Trizil of Chicago; and nine grandchildren.
