= Robert L. Turner =

American politician (born 1947)

Member of the Wisconsin State Assembly from the 61st district
- In office January 7, 1991 – January 7, 2013
- Preceded by: Scott C. Fergus
- Succeeded by: Samantha Kerkman

Member of the Racine City Council
- In office 1976–2004

Personal details
- Born: September 14, 1947 (age 79) Columbus, Mississippi, U.S.
- Party: Democratic
- Education: UW Parkside
- Occupation: Politician

Military service
- Allegiance: United States
- Branch: United States Air Force
- Service years: 1967–1970
- Battles/wars: Vietnam War; Tet Offensive

Robert L. Turner (born September 14, 1947) is an American public administrator and Democratic politician from Racine, Wisconsin. He represented the city of Racine for eleven terms in the Wisconsin State Assembly, from 1991 to 2013. Since 2018, he has been a member of the Racine Police and Fire Commission. Turner was the first African American elected to Wisconsin's Assembly not from Milwaukee.

== Biography ==
Turner was born in Columbus, Mississippi, and moved with his family to Racine. He was employed by the J.I. Case Company, and served four years in the United States Air Force Security Police during the Vietnam War, from 1967 through 1970, including service during the 1968 Tet Offensive. He was elected to the City Council in 1976, and was elected to the State Assembly in 1990. He left the City Council in 2004 after serving concurrently as City Councilmember and State Assemblymember for 14 years.

After the arrest and resignation of Racine Mayor Gary Becker in 2009, Turner announced his candidacy for the special election to fill the remainder of Becker's term. Turner passed the primary, but was defeated in the runoff by John Dickert. Turner had previously defeated Dickert in the 1990 and 2002 primary elections for Wisconsin Assembly.

He announced his retirement from the Assembly in 2012, after redistricting dramatically reshaped the Racine-area senate and assembly districts. His retirement cleared the way for Cory Mason to run in the redrawn 66th District, which was composed of the southern part of Turner's old 61st District and the eastern part of Mason's old 62nd District.

In 2018, Cory Mason, now Racine Mayor, nominated Turner to the Racine Police and Fire Commission.

Turner is a life member of the Vietnam Veterans of America, the American Legion, and a 33rd degree Mason.

== Electoral history ==
=== Wisconsin Assembly (1984) ===
Year	Election	Date	Elected				Defeated				Total	Plurality
1984	Primary	Sep. 11	Scott C. Fergus	Democratic	1,920	53.36%	Robert L. Turner	Dem.	1,345	37.38%	3,598	575
1984	Primary	Sep. 11	Scott C. Fergus	Democratic	1,920	53.36%	William M. Frank	Dem.	333	9.26%	3,598	575

=== Wisconsin Assembly (1990–2008) ===
Year	Election	Date	Elected				Defeated				Total	Plurality
1990	Primary	Sep. 11	Robert L. Turner	Democratic	2,056	55.06%	John Dickert	Dem.	1,193	31.95%	3,734	863
1990	Primary	Sep. 11	Robert L. Turner	Democratic	2,056	55.06%	Cathleen A. Cotter	Dem.	485	12.99%	3,734	863
1990	General	Nov. 6	Robert L. Turner	Democratic	7,232	62.09%	Roderick D. Wilhelmi	Rep.	4,415	37.91%	11,647	2,817
1992	General	Nov. 3	Robert L. Turner (inc)	Democratic	11,963	66.66%	Stella A. Young	Rep.	5,984	33.34%	17,947	5,979
1994	General	Nov. 8	Robert L. Turner (inc)	Democratic	7,464	100.0%	--Unopposed--				7,464	7,464
1996	General	Nov. 5	Robert L. Turner (inc)	Democratic	10,218	85.97%	Thomas Rivers	Tax.	904	7.61%	11,886	9,314
1996	General	Nov. 5	Robert L. Turner (inc)	Democratic	10,218	85.97%	Michael L. Wynhoff	Lib.	764	6.43%	11,886	9,314
1998	Primary	Sep. 8	Robert L. Turner (inc)	Democratic	1,535	79.12%	Ken Lumpkin	Dem.	405	20.88%	1,940	1,130
1998	General	Nov. 3	Robert L. Turner (inc)	Democratic	9,515	100.0%	--Unopposed--				9,515	9,515
2000	General	Nov. 7	Robert L. Turner (inc)	Democratic	13,703	99.56%	--Unopposed--				13,763	13,643
2002	Primary	Sep. 10	Robert L. Turner (inc)	Democratic	3,194	52.24%	John Dickert	Dem.	2,919	47.74%	6,114	275
2002	General	Nov. 5	Robert L. Turner (inc)	Democratic	9,525	98.15%	--Unopposed--				9,705	9,345
2004	General	Nov. 2	Robert L. Turner (inc)	Democratic	17,173	89.49%	George Meyers	Lib.	1,980	10.32%	19,189	15,193
2006	General	Nov. 7	Robert L. Turner (inc)	Democratic	11,431	99.06%	--Unopposed--				11,539	11,323
2008	General	Nov. 4	Robert L. Turner (inc)	Democratic	16,267	87.71%	George Meyers	Lib.	2,242	12.09%	18,547	14,025
2010	Primary	Sep. 14	Robert L. Turner (inc)	Democratic	1,777	77.90%	James DeMatthew	Dem.	504	22.10%	2,281	1,273
2010	General	Nov. 2	Robert L. Turner (inc)	Democratic	10,026	81.96%	George Meyers	Lib.	2,167	17.71%	12,233	7,859

=== Racine Mayor (2009) ===
Racine Mayoral Special Election, 2009
Party	Candidate	Votes	%	±%
Primary Election, April 7, 2009
Democratic	John Dickert	2,307	23.09%	
Democratic	Robert Turner	1,671	16.73%	
Democratic	Kimberly Plache	1,313	13.14%	
Independent	James Spangenberg	1,249	12.50%	
Independent	Greg Helding	1,150	11.51%	
Independent	Pete Karas	851	8.52%	
Independent	Jody Harding	658	6.59%	
Independent	Q.A. Shakoor II	414	4.14%	
Independent	Lesia Hill-Driver	161	1.61%	
Independent	Raymond Fay	148	1.48%	
Independent	Jaimie Charon	69	0.69%	
Total votes		9,991	100.0%	
General Election, May 5, 2009
Democratic	John Dickert	6,027	55.46%	
Democratic	Robert Turner	4,841	44.54%	
Total votes		10,868	100.0%	

Wisconsin State Assembly
Preceded by Scott C. Fergus	Member of the Wisconsin State Assembly from the 61st district January 7, 1991 – January 7, 2013	Succeeded by Samantha Kerkman
