= Samantha Kerkman =

21st century American politician

County Executive of Kenosha County, Wisconsin
- Incumbent
- Assumed office April 19, 2022
- Preceded by: James Kreuser

Member of the Wisconsin State Assembly
- In office January 7, 2013 – June 7, 2022
- Preceded by: Robert L. Turner
- Succeeded by: Amanda Nedweski
- Constituency: 61st Assembly district
- In office January 1, 2001 – January 7, 2013
- Preceded by: Cloyd A. Porter
- Succeeded by: Cory Mason
- Constituency: 66th Assembly district

Personal details
- Born: Samantha Starzyk; March 6, 1974 (age 52) Burlington, Wisconsin, U.S.
- Party: Republican
- Spouse: Chad Kerkman (m. 2001; div. 2013)
- Children: 2
- Education: University of Wisconsin, Whitewater (BA)

Samantha Kerkman (née Starzyk; born March 6, 1974) is an American politician. She is the county executive of Kenosha County, Wisconsin, serving since April 2022. She previously represented Kenosha County in the Wisconsin State Assembly from 2001 through 2022.

== Early life and career ==
Samantha Kerkman was born Samantha Starzyk in Burlington, Wisconsin. She graduated from Wilmot Union High School and attended the University of Wisconsin–Whitewater, where she earned a bachelor's degree in political science in 1996.

== Political career ==
While in college, Kerkman began working as an intern and legislative assistant in the office of State Representative Cloyd A. Porter, and, after graduating, was named his chief of staff. She also began volunteering with the Randall, Wisconsin, Fire Department Auxiliary.

When Porter announced in 2000 that he would not seek reelection to a 15th term, Kerkman chose to enter the race to replace him. Porter quickly endorsed his former legislative aide, saying, "I think Samantha has made an excellent decision. I am confident that Samantha has the strength, energy, and the dedication to serve the people of the 66th to her full potential." She prevailed in the Republican primary with 85% of the vote and went on to take 61% of the general election vote against Democrat Virgil Gentz. Kerkman was subsequently reelected five times in the 66th assembly district, and, after redistricting in 2013, Kerkman has been serving in what is now the 61st assembly district. On April 5, 2022, Kerkman was elected Kenosha County Executive. She assumed office on April 18, 2022.

== Personal life and family ==
Samantha Starzyk took the last name Kerkman in 2001, when she married attorney Chad Kerkman. They have two children and divorced in 2013.

Wisconsin State Assembly
Preceded by Cloyd A. Porter	Member of the Wisconsin State Assembly from the 66th district January 1, 2001 – January 7, 2013	Succeeded by Cory Mason
Preceded by Robert L. Turner	Member of the Wisconsin State Assembly from the 61st district January 7, 2013 – June 7, 2022	Succeeded by Amanda Nedweski
Political offices
Preceded by James Kreuser	County Executive of Kenosha County, Wisconsin; April 19, 2022 – present	Incumbent
