= 1998 Wisconsin Senate election =

1998 Wisconsin State Senate election
- November 3, 1998

17 of 33 seats in the Wisconsin Senate 17 seats needed for a majority
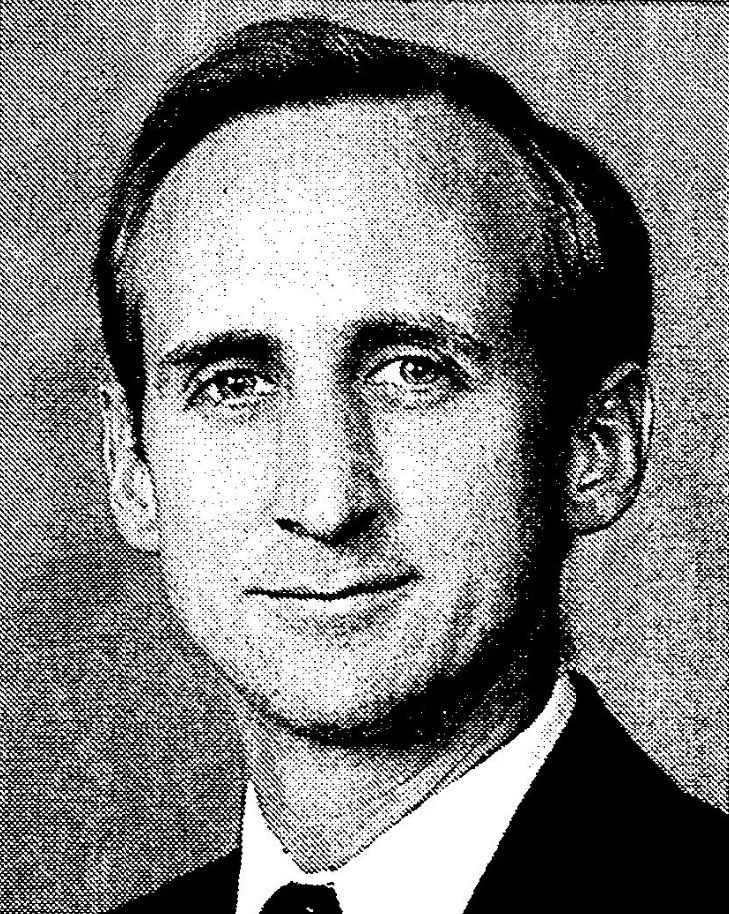

	Majority party	Minority party
Leader	Charles Chvala	Michael Ellis
Party	Democratic	Republican
Leader since	October 17, 1995	January 2, 1989
Leader's seat	16th–Madison	19th–Neenah
Last election	9 seats, TBD%	7seats, TBD%
Seats before	16	17
Seats won	9	8
Seats after	17	16
Seat change	▲1	▼1
Popular vote	386,360	441,073
Percentage	46.13%	52.67%
- Democratic hold Democratic gain Republican hold No election 50–60% 60–70% >90% 60–70% 70–80% >90% No election
President before election
Brian Rude
Republican
Elected President
Fred Risser
Democratic

The 1998 Wisconsin Senate election was held on Tuesday, November 3, 1998. Seventeen of the 33 seats in the Wisconsin Senate were up for election—the odd-numbered districts. At the time, Republicans held 17 seats while the Democrats held 16, having lost their majority only months prior due to Republicans winning a special election to replace Senator Lynn Adelman.

== Summary ==
Party	Candidates	Votes	
Party	Candidates	No.	%
Democratic	15	386,360	46.13%
Republican	15	441,073	52.67%
Independent	2	6,296	0.75%
Taxpayers	1	975	0.12%
Libertarian	1	816	0.09%
Write-in	–	1,992	0.24%
Total		837,512	100.0%

=== Close races ===
Seats where the margin of victory was under 10%:

1. State Senate district 9, 5.48%
2. State Senate district 15, 7.82% (gain)
3. State Senate district 5, 8.23%

== Results summary ==
Dist.	Incumbent				This race
Dist.	Member	Party	First elected	Status	General
01	Alan Lasee	Republican	1977 (special)	Incumbent re-elected	▌ ✓ Alan Lasee (Rep.) 87.33%; ▌Janet E. Van Asten (Ind.) 18.59%
03	Brian Burke	Democratic	1988 (special)	Incumbent re-elected	▌ ✓ Brian Burke (Dem.) 98.41%
05	Peggy Rosenzweig	Republican	1993 (special)	Incumbent re-elected	▌ ✓ Peggy Rosenzweig (Rep.) 53.30%; ▌ Jim Bohl (Dem.) 45.07%; ▌ Dave Howard (Lib.) 1.53%
07	Richard Grobschmidt	Democratic	1995 (special)	Incumbent re-elected	▌ ✓ Richard Grobschmidt (Dem.) 98.69%
09	Calvin Potter	Democratic	1990	Incumbent retired. New member elected. Democratic hold.	▌ ✓ James Baumgart (Dem.) 52.72%; ▌Paul F. Nus (Rep.) 47.24%
11	Joanne Huelsman	Republican	1990	Incumbent re-elected	▌ ✓ Joanne Huelsman (Rep.) 68.00%; ▌Richard W. Hennecke (Dem.) 31.60%
13	Scott L. Fitzgerald	Republican	1994	Incumbent re-elected	▌ ✓ Scott L. Fitzgerald (Rep.) 67.26%; ▌Susan L. Lidholm (Dem.) 30.75%; ▌Kenneth W. Eyre (Tax.) 1.96%
15	Timothy Weeden	Republican	1987 (special)	Incumbent retired. New member elected. Democratic gain.	▌ ✓ Judy Robson (Dem.) 53.88%; ▌Bill Sodemann (Rep.) 46.06%
17	Dale Schultz	Republican	1991 (special)	Incumbent re-elected	▌ ✓ Dale Schultz (Rep.) 70.48%; ▌James M. McGhee (Dem.) 29.51%
19	Michael Ellis	Republican	1982	Incumbent re-elected	▌ ✓ Michael Ellis (Rep.) 70.46%; ▌Michael L. Meyer (Dem.) 29.46%
21	Kimberly Plache	Democratic	1996 (recall)	Incumbent re-elected	▌ ✓ Kimberly Plache (Dem.) 55.40%; ▌David Hazen (Rep.) 44.49%
23	David Zien	Republican	1993 (special)	Incumbent re-elected	▌ ✓ David Zien (Rep.) 61.03%; ▌Paul Gordon (Dem.) 38.92%
25	Bob Jauch	Democratic	1986	Incumbent re-elected	▌ ✓ Robert Jauch (Dem.) 65.33%; ▌Robert G. Schuck (Rep.) 34.65%
27	Joe Wineke	Democratic	1993 (special)	Incumbent re-elected	▌ ✓ Joe Wineke (Dem.) 56.54%; ▌Nancy Mistele (Rep.) 43.39%
29	Russ Decker	Democratic	1990	Incumbent re-elected	▌ ✓ Russ Decker (Dem.) 62.44%; ▌Dan Krcma (Rep.) 37.54%
31	Rodney C. Moen	Democratic	1982	Incumbent re-elected	▌ ✓ Rodney C. Moen (Dem.) 67.94%; ▌Gary Klinker (Rep.) 31.97%
33	Margaret Farrow	Republican	1989 (special)	Incumbent re-elected	▌ ✓ Margaret Farrow (Rep.) 99.07%
