= Cathy Stepp =

American politician (born 1963)

8th Secretary of the Wisconsin Department of Natural Resources
- In office January 3, 2011 – August 31, 2017
- Governor: Scott Walker
- Preceded by: Matthew J. Frank
- Succeeded by: Dan Meyer

Member of the Wisconsin Senate from the 21st district
- In office January 6, 2003 – January 3, 2007
- Preceded by: Kimberly Plache
- Succeeded by: John Lehman

Personal details
- Born: Catherine L. O'Donnell; August 17, 1963 (age 63) Kenosha, Wisconsin, U.S.
- Party: Republican
- Spouse: Paul Stepp
- Children: 2

Catherine L. "Cathy" Stepp (née O'Donnell; born August 17, 1963) is an American government administrator and former Republican politician. She is the city administrator of Branson, Missouri, and previously served as regional administrator (midwest) of the U.S. Environmental Protection Agency under President Donald Trump. Earlier, she was secretary of the Wisconsin Department of Natural Resources in the cabinet of governor Scott Walker, and served four years in the Wisconsin State Senate, representing Racine County.

== Biography ==
Stepp was born in Kenosha, Wisconsin, and graduated from Oak Creek High School in Oak Creek, Wisconsin, in 1981. After marrying, she joined the homebuilding firm of her husband, known as First Stepp Builders, in Racine, Wisconsin, and became co-owner of the company. Through the business community, she rose in prominence in local affairs, and in 2000 she was appointed by Governor Tommy Thompson to the state's Natural Resources Board, which oversees the Wisconsin Department of Natural Resources.

In 2002, Stepp successfully challenged Democratic Senator Kimberly Plache for Plache's Racine County-based State Senate seat. From 2003 until 2007, Stepp served as a Republican in the Wisconsin State Senate, representing the 21st Senate district. Stepp was only the second Republican to win an election in the Racine County Senate district in the previous 50 years. She announced in 2005 that she would not run for re-election in 2006, saying she wanted to devote more time to her family. She was succeeded by Democrat John Lehman.

In January 2011, Governor Scott Walker appointed Stepp to be his Secretary of the Wisconsin Department of Natural Resources (DNR). During her tenure, Stepp rolled back environmental oversight and regulation.

In August 2017, it was announced that Stepp would be resigning to become a deputy administrator of the U.S. Environmental Protection Agency. Stepp supported Trump at rallies in Wisconsin, and has questioned the existence of climate change.

Stepp resigned from the EPA in January 2020, and moved to Missouri, where she worked for a clean water non-profit and an ecological restoration company. She was hired as city administrator of Branson, Missouri, in 2022.

== Electoral history ==
=== Wisconsin Senate (2002) ===
Wisconsin Senate, 21st District Election, 2002
Party	Candidate	Votes	%	±%
Republican Primary, September 10, 2002
Republican	Cathy Stepp	5,462	77.17%	
Republican	John W. Knuteson	1,613	22.79%	
	Scattering	3	0.04%	
Plurality		3,849	54.38%	
Total votes		7,078	100.0%	
General Election, November 5, 2002
Republican	Cathy Stepp	25,367	50.68%	+6.14%
Democratic	Kimberly Plache (incumbent)	24,594	49.14%	−6.32%
	Scattering	89	0.18%	
Plurality		773	1.54%	-9.38%
Total votes		50,050	100.0%	+1.48%
Republican gain from Democratic				

Wisconsin Senate
Preceded by Kimberly Plache	Member of the Wisconsin Senate from the 21st district January 2003 – January 2007	Succeeded by John Lehman
Government offices
Preceded by Matthew J. Frank	Secretary of the Wisconsin Department of Natural Resources; January 3, 2011 – August 31, 2017	Succeeded by Dan Meyer
