= Scott C. Fergus =

American politician (born 1955)

Member of the Wisconsin State Assembly from the 61st district
- In office January 7, 1985 – July 1, 1990
- Preceded by: Sheehan Donoghue
- Succeeded by: Robert L. Turner

Personal details
- Born: January 27, 1955 (age 71) Racine, Wisconsin, U.S.
- Party: Democratic
- Education: Carthage College
- Occupation: Real estate developer

Scott C. Fergus (born January 27, 1955) is an American real estate developer and former politician from Racine, Wisconsin. A Democrat, he was a member of the Wisconsin State Assembly for three terms, representing the 61st Assembly district from 1985 through 1990. He chose not to run for re-election after being implicated in a scandal involving several lawmakers receiving improper gifts from lobbyists. Subsequently, he was involved in several major real estate projects in southeast Wisconsin, but went bankrupt after the real estate bubble burst in 2008.

== Biography ==
Fergus was born on January 27, 1955, in Racine, Wisconsin. He graduated from Washington Park High School and Carthage College.

== Career ==
Fergus was first elected to the Assembly in 1984 and was re-elected in 1986 and 1988. In 1989, Fergus was one of about a dozen Wisconsin legislators caught up in a "John Doe" investigation of improper gifts from lobbyists. Fergus ultimately paid about $2,000 in fines.

In May, 1990, Fergus announced he would not seek re-election and would instead take a job as Vice President of the Wisconsin Realtors Association.

A few years later he founded the Nexus Builders Group, a construction company, and moved into residential and commercial property development as President of the KeyBridge Development Group. In 2008, Fergus went bankrupt pursuing two major residential development projects, Pointe Blue, on the Racine harbor, and First Place, a condo development in Milwaukee.

== Electoral history ==
=== Wisconsin Assembly (1984, 1986, 1988) ===
Year	Election	Date	Elected				Defeated				Total	Plurality
1984	Primary	Sep. 11	Scott C. Fergus	Democratic	1,920	53.36%	Robert L. Turner	Dem.	1,345	37.38%	3,598	575
1984	Primary	Sep. 11	Scott C. Fergus	Democratic	1,920	53.36%	William M. Frank	Dem.	333	9.26%	3,598	575
1984	General	Nov. 6	Scott C. Fergus	Democratic	10,880	55.21%	Donald Walsh	Rep.	8,827	44.79%	19,707	2,053
1986	General	Nov. 4	Scott C. Fergus (inc)	Democratic	7,575	58.88%	Norman T. Monson	Rep.	5,291	41.12%	12,866	2,284
1988	General	Nov. 8	Scott C. Fergus (inc)	Democratic	11,700	67.09%	Gwendolyn Wortock	Rep.	5,738	32.91%	17,438	5,962

Wisconsin State Assembly
Preceded by Sheehan Donoghue	Member of the Wisconsin State Assembly from the 61st district January 7, 1985 – July 1, 1990	Succeeded by Robert L. Turner
