= Kimberly Plache =

American politician (born 1961)

Member of the Wisconsin Senate from the 21st district
- In office June 14, 1996 – January 6, 2003
- Preceded by: George Petak
- Succeeded by: Cathy Stepp

Member of the Wisconsin State Assembly from the 62nd district
- In office January 3, 1989 – June 13, 1996
- Preceded by: Jeffrey A. Neubauer
- Succeeded by: John Lehman

Member of the Racine Unified School Board
- In office 2009–2016

Personal details
- Born: January 4, 1961 (age 65) Racine, Wisconsin, U.S.
- Party: Democratic
- Spouse: Paul Hable
- Children: 1
- Education: University of Wisconsin–Parkside

Kimberly Plache (born January 4, 1961) is a retired American public administrator and Democratic politician from Racine, Wisconsin. She served six years as a member of the Wisconsin Senate, representing Wisconsin's 21st Senate district from 1996 to 2003; she was first elected to the Senate by defeating incumbent George Petak in a June 1996 recall election—this was the first successful recall of a Wisconsin state legislator. She previously served four terms in the Wisconsin State Assembly (1989–1996).

After leaving elected office, she worked for 20 years for the Wisconsin Housing and Economic Development Authority, retiring as deputy executive director in 2024. During those years, she also served on the Racine Unified School Board from 2009 to 2016.

== Early life and education ==
Born in Racine, Wisconsin, Plache graduated from William Horlick High School in 1979. In 1984, she received her bachelor's degree in psychology from University of Wisconsin–Parkside.

== Career ==
Shortly after her college graduation, Plache was hired as a legislative aide by her representative in the Wisconsin State Assembly, Jeffrey A. Neubauer. When Neubauer chose not to run for re-election in 1988, Plache ran and was elected to succeed him in the Assembly.

She was re-elected in 1990, 1992, and 1994.

In October 1995, Racine County's representative in the Wisconsin Senate, George Petak, ran into controversy when he changed his vote on a funding bill for the Miller Park stadium. Miller Park was being planned to replace the forty-year-old Milwaukee County Stadium and was being pushed by Republican Governor Tommy Thompson and Milwaukee Brewers owner and future-Commissioner of Baseball, Bud Selig. Petak had promised his constituents that he would vote against the bill, but changed his mind based on the belief that the Brewers would leave Wisconsin if a new stadium wasn't built.

Petak's deciding vote supported a 0.1 percent sales tax increase for the five counties in the proposed stadium's vicinity, including Racine. Petak faced immediate outrage in his home district, and local Democrats were energized to collect signatures for a recall petition. The petition was certified on March 26, 1996, and a recall election was ordered for June.

Plache decided to run in the recall and faced no competition in the Democratic primary. In June, she defeated Petak, making him the first Wisconsin state legislator to be removed from office in a recall election.

Plache was re-elected to a full term in the senate in 1998, defeating Racine Unified School Board Member David Hazen. Plache sought re-election again in 2002, but was narrowly defeated by Republican Cathy Stepp.

After leaving office, she began working as a community relations officer for the Wisconsin Housing and Economic Development Authority. She was employed there for the next 20 years, rising to the role of deputy executive director.

While working for WHEDA, in 2009 Plache resumed interest in electoral politics when she ran in the special mayoral election in Racine, following the resignation and indictment of the previous mayor. She did not advance from the primary, but later that year, she was elected to an at-large seat on the Racine Unified School Board. She ultimately served on the school board until 2016, when the Republican majority in the Wisconsin Legislature passed special legislation to abolish at-large seats specifically for the Racine School District. She ran for re-election in the same district as fellow incumbent Julie McKenna, but lost by 101 votes.

== Personal life ==
Plache married Paul Hable in October 1999. They live in Mount Pleasant, Wisconsin, and they have one daughter.

== Electoral history ==
=== Wisconsin Assembly (1988–1994) ===
Year	Election	Date	Elected				Defeated				Total	Plurality
1988	Primary	Sep. 13	Kimberly Plache	Democratic	2,846	59.56%	Thomas A. Kexel	Dem.	1,932	40.44%	4,778	914
1988	General	Nov. 8	Kimberly Plache	Democratic	11,796	62.76%	Saundra Herre	Rep.	6,703	35.66%	18,796	5,093
1988	General	Nov. 8	Kimberly Plache	Democratic	11,796	62.76%	Kay C. Rouse	Ind.	297	1.58%	18,796	5,093
1990	General	Nov. 6	Kimberly Plache (inc)	Democratic	7,484	62.75%	Kay C. Rouse	Rep.	4,443	37.25%	11,927	3,041
1992	General	Nov. 3	Kimberly Plache (inc)	Democratic	14,244	61.28%	Mark Ladd	Rep.	8,999	38.72%	23,243	5,245
1994	General	Nov. 8	Kimberly Plache (inc)	Democratic	9,504	59.74%	James Turek	Rep.	6,406	40.26%	15,910	3,098

=== Wisconsin Senate (1996–2002) ===
Year	Election	Date	Elected				Defeated				Total	Plurality
1996 (recall)	Recall	Jun. 4	Kimberly Plache	Democratic	21,045	51.22%	George Petak (inc)	Rep.	19,318	47.02%	41,088	1,727
1996 (recall)	Recall	Jun. 4	Kimberly Plache	Democratic	21,045	51.22%	Todd Mascaretti	Lib.	725	1.76%	41,088	1,727
1998	General	Nov. 3	Kimberly Plache (inc)	Democratic	27,353	55.46%	David Hazen	Rep.	21,967	44.54%	49,320	5,386
2002	General	Nov. 5	Cathy Stepp	Republican	25,367	50.68%	Kimberly Plache (inc)	Dem.	24,594	49.14%	50,050	773

=== Racine Mayor (2009) ===
Racine Mayoral Special Election, 2009
Party	Candidate	Votes	%	±%
Primary Election
Independent	John Dickert	2,307	23.09%	
Independent	Robert L. Turner	1,671	16.73%	
Independent	Kimberly Plache	1,313	13.14%	
Independent	James Spangenberg	1,249	12.50%	
Independent	Greg Helding	1,150	11.51%	
Independent	Pete Karas	851	8.52%	
Independent	Jody Harding	658	6.59%	
Independent	Q.A. Shakoor II	414	4.14%	
Independent	Lesia Hill-Driver	161	1.61%	
Independent	Raymond Fay	148	1.48%	
Independent	Jaimie Charon	69	0.69%	
Total votes		'9,991'	'100.0%'	
General Election
Independent	John Dickert	6,027	55.46%	
Independent	Robert L. Turner	4,841	44.54%	
Total votes		'10,868'	'100.0%'	

=== Racine School Board (2009–2016) ===
Racine School Board Election, 2009
Party	Candidate	Votes	%	±%
General Election
Independent	Don J. Nielsen (incumbent)	9,550	24.46%	
Independent	Gretchen L. Warner (incumbent)	8,440	21.62%	
Independent	Kimberly Plache	7,747	19.84%	
Independent	Stella A. Young	7,041	18.04%	
Independent	John Leiber	6,176	15.82%	
	Write-ins	85	0.22%	
Total votes		'39,039'	'100.0%'	

Racine School Board Election, 2012
Party	Candidate	Votes	%	±%
General Election
Independent	Kimberly Plache (incumbent)	12,223	22.27%	
Independent	Don J. Nielsen (incumbent)	10,383	18.91%	
Independent	Gretchen L. Warner (incumbent)	10,012	18.24%	
Independent	Brian Dey	7,910	14.41%	
Independent	Roger Pfost	7,416	13.51%	
Independent	Scott Brownell	6,840	12.46%	
	Write-ins	112	0.20%	
Total votes		'54,896'	'100.0%'	

Racine School Board Election, 2015
Party	Candidate	Votes	%	±%
General Election
Independent	Kimberly Plache (incumbent)	11,183	25.33%	
Independent	Don J. Nielsen (incumbent)	9,571	21.68%	
Independent	Lisa Parham	9,248	20.95%	
Independent	Wally Rendón (incumbent)	7,494	16.97%	
Independent	Bryn Biemeck	6,656	15.08%	
Total votes		'44,152'	'100.0%'	

Racine School Board, 4th District Election, 2016
Party	Candidate	Votes	%	±%
General Election
Independent	Julie McKenna (incumbent)	2,293	51.13%	
Independent	Kimberly Plache (incumbent)	2,192	48.87%	
Total votes		'4,485'	'100.0%'	
