= Joseph A. Strohl =

American politician (born 1946)

Joseph Strohl

Wisconsin Senate Majority Leader
- In office January 5, 1987 – January 7, 1991
- Preceded by: Timothy Cullen
- Succeeded by: David Helbach

Member of the Wisconsin Senate from the 21st district
- In office January 3, 1979 – January 7, 1991
- Preceded by: Henry Dorman
- Succeeded by: George Petak

Personal details
- Born: March 19, 1946 (age 80) Evanston, Illinois, U.S.
- Party: Democratic
- Children: 2
- Education: Northern Michigan University

Joseph A. Strohl (born March 19, 1946) is a Wisconsin lobbyist and former Majority Leader of the Wisconsin State Senate. He represented Racine County as a Democrat from 1979 through 1991.

== Biography ==
Joseph Strohl was born on March 19, 1946, in Evanston, Illinois. He graduated from high school in Stephenson, Michigan, received his B.S. from Northern Michigan University and attended graduate school at the University of Wisconsin–Milwaukee. Strohl is married with one child and one stepchild. He worked as a teacher before entering politics.

== Political career ==
Strohl began his political career working as a legislative aide to Congressman Les Aspin, (WI-01), from 1971 to 1978.

In 1978, Strohl challenged 14-year incumbent Wisconsin Senator Henry Dorman in the 21st District Senate Primary. Dorman had been indicted earlier in the year for misuse of state telephone credit cards, and was plagued by other controversies, including a nepotism scandal. Strohl's opponent in the 1978 general election was Sister Michelle Olley, the President of the Racine Unified School Board and a Catholic nun. Olley had been embroiled in a contentious, months-long teachers strike in 1977 which lead to dozens of arrests. Strohl defeated Olley in the general election, held November 7, 1978. He was re-elected in 1982 and 1986, ultimately serving twelve years in the Senate, including four years as Senate Majority Leader.

In 1989, Strohl ran into controversy when, as Majority Leader, he prevented a parental consent bill from coming to a vote on the Senate floor. This was exploited in the 1990 election by Strohl's opponent, Racine Unified School Board Member George Petak. Strohl went on to lose that election, held November 6, 1990. Petak took office in 1991, the first time a Republican had held the 21st district senate seat since Edward F. Hilker died in office in 1949.

Since leaving the Senate, Strohl has worked as a lobbyist in Madison.

== Electoral history ==
Wisconsin Senate, 21st District Election, 1978
Party	Candidate	Votes	%	±%
Primary Election
Democratic	Joseph Strohl	10,884	52.28%	
Democratic	Henry Dorman (incumbent)	6,452	31.00%	
Republican	Michelle Olley	3,480	16.72%	
Total votes		'20,815'	'100.0%'	
General Election
Democratic	Joseph Strohl (incumbent)	25,659	64.37%	
Republican	Michelle Olley	14,202	35.63%	
Total votes		'39,861'	'100.0%'	
Democratic hold				

Wisconsin Senate, 21st District Election, 1982
Party	Candidate	Votes	%	±%
Primary Election
Democratic	Joseph Strohl (incumbent)	11,945	66.00%	
Republican	Edward J. Huck	6,153	34.00%	
Total votes		'18,098'	'100.0%'	
General Election
Democratic	Joseph Strohl (incumbent)	27,497	62.55%	−1.82%
Republican	Edward J. Huck	16,465	37.45%	+1.82%
Total votes		'43,962'	'100.0%'	+10.29%
Democratic hold				

Wisconsin Senate, 21st District Election, 1986
Party	Candidate	Votes	%	±%
Primary Election
Democratic	Joseph Strohl (incumbent)	6,123	57.49%	
Republican	Donald E. Walsh	4,528	42.51%	
Total votes		'10,651'	'100.0%'	
General Election
Democratic	Joseph Strohl (incumbent)	23,179	56.26%	−6.29%
Republican	Donald E. Walsh	18,018	43.74%	+6.29%
Total votes		'41,179'	'100.0%'	-6.33%
Democratic hold				

Wisconsin Senate, 21st District Election, 1990
Party	Candidate	Votes	%	±%
Primary Election
Democratic	Joseph Strohl (incumbent)	4,821	61.70%	
Republican	George Petak	2,992	38.30%	
Total votes		7,813	'100.0%'	
General Election
Republican	George Petak	23,216	58.66%	+14.92%
Democratic	Joseph Strohl (incumbent)	16,360	41.34%	−14.92%
Total votes		39,576	'100.0%'	-3.89%
Republican gain from Democratic				

Wisconsin Senate
Preceded by Timothy Cullen	Wisconsin Senate Majority Leader; 1987 – 1991	Succeeded by David Helbach
Preceded by Henry Dorman	Wisconsin State Senator, 21st District; 1979 – 1991	Succeeded by George Petak
