= Amanda Nedweski =

American politician (born 1975)

Member of the Wisconsin State Assembly
- Incumbent
- Assumed office January 6, 2025
- Preceded by: Tyler August
- Constituency: 32nd district
- In office January 3, 2023 – January 6, 2025
- Preceded by: Samantha Kerkman
- Succeeded by: Bob Donovan
- Constituency: 61st district

Member of the Board of Supervisors of Kenosha County, Wisconsin, from the 16th district
- In office April 2022 – April 2024
- Preceded by: Jerry Gulley
- Succeeded by: Frederick Brookhouse

Personal details
- Born: December 22, 1975 (age 50) Kenosha County, Wisconsin, U.S.
- Party: Republican
- Spouse: Glenn Madrigrano Jr. (m. 2002; div. 2014)
- Children: 1
- Education: Carthage College; University of Wisconsin–Parkside (BA)
- Website: Campaign website

Amanda Marie Nedweski (born December 22, 1975) is an American financial analyst and Republican politician from Kenosha County, Wisconsin. She is a member of the Wisconsin State Assembly, representing Wisconsin's 32nd Assembly district since 2025; she previously represented the 61st Assembly district during the 2023–2024 term. She also previously served as a member of the Kenosha County board of supervisors.

She was previously known as Amanda Marie Madrigrano from 2002 through 2014.

== Biography ==
Amanda Nedweski was born in Kenosha County, Wisconsin, and graduated from Mary D. Bradford High School in 1994. She attended University of Wisconsin–Parkside, in Kenosha County, and earned her bachelor's degree in 1998. She went to work for Braun Consulting after graduating, and in 2002 was hired by CNH Industrial as a financial analyst.

She became a full time mom around 2006.

== Political career ==
Nedweski first became politically active in opposition to distance learning in the Kenosha Unified School District during the COVID-19 pandemic. In January 2021, she was a co-founder of the Kenosha chapter of Moms for Liberty—a conservative advocacy group directed at taking control of school boards. That was followed by more aggressive confrontation with the Kenosha School Board in 2021. Ultimately, she sought to organize a recall effort against Kenosha's school board president, but failed to collect enough signatures to force an election. Following the failure of the recall petition, Nedweski won election to the Kenosha County board of supervisors in the Spring 2022 election, running in an open seat.

In the same Spring 2022 election, incumbent state representative Samantha Kerkman was elected county executive of Kenosha County, and would therefore have to resign her Assembly seat. Nedweski announced her campaign for Wisconsin State Assembly just a month after winning her seat on the county board. She defeated bar owner Mike Honold in the Republican primary and went on to win 64% of the general election vote in the heavily Republican district.

She assumed office in January 2023.

== Personal life and family ==
Amanda Nedweski married Glenn Madrigrano Jr. on October 19, 2002, and took the last name Madrigrano. The Madrigrano family is well known in the Kenosha area, Glenn's great grandfather founded the family beer business, which is now a major beer distributor across southeast Wisconsin. Amanda and Glenn Madrigrano had one son together before divorcing in 2014. After the divorce, she changed her name back to Nedweski.

== Electoral history ==
=== Kenosha County Board (2022) ===
Year	Election	Date	Elected				Defeated				Total	Plurality
2022	Primary	Feb. 15	Amanda Nedweski	Nonpartisan	453	51.19%	James M. Kedrow	Non.	68	7.68%	885	91
2022	Primary	Feb. 15	Laverne Jaros	Nonpartisan	362	40.90%	James M. Kedrow	Non.	68	7.68%	885	91
2022	General	Apr. 5	Amanda Nedweski	Nonpartisan	960	54.73%	Laverne Jaros	Non.	791	45.10%	1,754	169

=== Wisconsin Assembly, 61st district (2022) ===
Year	Election	Date	Elected				Defeated				Total	Plurality
2022	Primary	Aug. 9	Amanda Nedweski	Republican	5,030	56.96%	Mike Honold	Rep.	3,785	42.86%	8,831	1,245
2022	General	Nov. 8	Amanda Nedweski	Republican	17,542	64.00%	Max Winkels	Dem.	9,851	35.94%	27,408	7,691

=== Wisconsin Assembly, 32nd district (2024) ===
Year	Election	Date	Elected				Defeated				Total	Plurality
2024	General	Nov. 5	Amanda Nedweski	Republican	24,257	67.93%	Michael Dhindsa	Dem.	11,409	31.95%	35,709	12,848

Wisconsin State Assembly
Preceded by Samantha Kerkman	Member of the Wisconsin State Assembly from the 61st district January 3, 2023 – January 6, 2025	Succeeded by Bob Donovan
Preceded by Tyler August	Member of the Wisconsin State Assembly from the 32nd district January 6, 2025 – present	Incumbent
