= Henry Dorman =

American lawyer and politician (1916–1998)

Member of the Wisconsin Senate from the 21st district
- In office January 13, 1965 – January 3, 1979
- Preceded by: Lynn E. Stalbaum
- Succeeded by: Joseph A. Strohl

Member of the Racine County Board of Supervisors
- In office 1956–1958

Personal details
- Born: September 24, 1916 Racine, Wisconsin, U.S.
- Died: November 9, 1998 (aged 82) Racine, Wisconsin, U.S.
- Resting place: Racine Jewish Memorial Cemetery; Racine, Wisconsin
- Party: Democratic
- Spouse: Jean L. Phillips (m. 1949–1998)
- Children: Robin; Wendy (LeBell); Lynne (Reisley); Heidi (Sweezy)
- Education: University of Wisconsin–Madison

Military service
- Allegiance: United States
- Branch/service: United States Army; U.S. Army Air Forces
- Years of service: 1943–1945
- Rank: Second Lieutenant
- Battles/wars: World War II

Henry Dorman (September 24, 1916 – November 9, 1998) was an American lawyer and politician. He served in the Wisconsin Senate from 1965 through 1979.

== Early life and education ==
Born in Racine, Wisconsin to Zachary and Eva Dorman, he graduated from William Horlick High School in 1935. He received his bachelor's degree from the University of Wisconsin in 1940. He served in the United States Army Air Forces during World War II. In 1947, he received his law degree from the University of Wisconsin law school and then practiced law.

== Political career ==
Dorman served on the Racine County Board of Supervisors from 1956 to 1958. In 1965, Dorman was elected to the Wisconsin State Senate as a Democrat. Dorman served for 14 years, but in 1978 Dorman had been indicted earlier in the year for misuse of state telephone credit cards, and was plagued by other controversies, including a nepotism scandal. He was defeated in the 1978 Democratic primary election by Joseph A. Strohl. Strohl went on to succeed Dorman in the Senate.

== Family and personal life ==
Dorman married Jean L. Phillips on May 29, 1949, in Rochester, New York. They had four daughters.

Dorman died at St. Mary's Medical Center, in Racine, at age 82. His funeral was held at Beth Israel Sinai Temple on September 11, 1998, and he was interred in the Racine Jewish Memorial Cemetery.

Dorman was a member of Beth Israel Sinai Congregation, the Wisconsin and Racine Bar Associations, and the National Society of State Legislators.

== Electoral history ==
Wisconsin 21st District Senate Special Election 1965
Party	Candidate	Votes	%	±%
Democratic	Henry Dorman	8,605	50.29%	
Republican	Bernard F. Miller	8,506	49.71%	
Total votes		'17,111'	'100.0%'	
Democratic hold				
