= Mary Burke =

American businesswoman (born 1959)

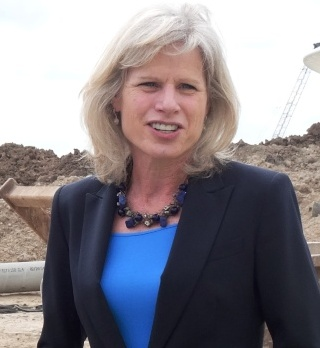

Secretary of Commerce of Wisconsin
- In office February 7, 2005 – November 1, 2007
- Governor: Jim Doyle
- Preceded by: Cory Nettles
- Succeeded by: Jack Fischer

Personal details
- Born: Mary Patricia Burke; April 30, 1959 (age 67) Madison, Wisconsin, US
- Party: Democratic
- Parent: Richard Burke (father)
- Education: Georgetown University (BA); London School of Economics; Harvard University (MBA)

Mary Patricia Burke (born April 30, 1959) is an American businesswoman. She was the Democratic candidate for Governor of Wisconsin in the 2014 election. She served as a member of the Madison, Wisconsin, school board from April 30, 2012, until July 5, 2019. Burke is a former executive at Trek Bicycle Corporation; she also served as the Wisconsin Secretary of Commerce from January 2005 to November 2007. She is the daughter of Trek Bicycle Corporation founder Richard Burke.

== Early life and education ==
Mary Burke is the second-oldest of the five children of Richard Burke, founder of Trek Bicycle Corporation. She grew up in Hartland, Wisconsin.

She graduated magna cum laude from Georgetown University, where she received a degree in business administration. She then attended Harvard Business School, where she earned a master's of business administration degree in 1985. She also attended the London School of Economics as part of the General Course.

== Career ==
Burke began her career as a consultant in New York and Washington, D.C., working for McKinsey & Company and briefly starting her own firm. Burke returned to Wisconsin to work for Trek, working as head of European operations and, later, as director of strategic planning. In 2005, Burke was appointed Wisconsin Secretary of Commerce by Governor Jim Doyle.

She left the post on November 1, 2007, to spend more time on family interests and non-profit work, particularly the Boys & Girls Club of Dane County. In 2008, Burke led a study on the financial troubles facing Milwaukee schools. In 2012, she was elected to a seat on the Madison school board after spending $128,000 of her own money on her campaign.

During Burke's gubernatorial campaign, two former Trek executives alleged that Burke had been forced out of her position in the European division at Trek due to financial losses and issues with her management style. Burke and her brother John, the CEO of Trek, denied the allegations. It was also later discovered that the individuals making those allegations had themselves been let go, one of whom was himself fired for "incompetence".

After Burke left Trek, she went on a two-year break, including a four-month snowboarding trip in Argentina and Colorado. She subsequently returned to a different position at her family's company.

In July 2019, Burke resigned from the Madison school board to focus on Building Brave, a nonprofit she founded with a goal of empowering women.

== 2014 gubernatorial election ==
On October 7, 2013, Burke announced her candidacy for the Democratic nomination to challenge Republican governor Scott Walker in the 2014 Wisconsin gubernatorial election. According to Politico, she had campaigned as a moderate. In August 2014, she was tied with Walker in the polls.

In September 2014, Burke acknowledged that portions of her jobs plan, "Invest for Success", were copied from previous proposals by other Democratic gubernatorial candidates in other states. The Burke campaign fired consultant Eric Schnurer, who had worked on those campaigns, for the unacknowledged copying.

On November 4, 2014, Burke lost the election to Governor Walker, by 136,793 votes.

== Personal life ==
Burke is active in her community, giving time and resources. She sits on several non-profit boards, and has volunteered regularly at Frank Allis Elementary, mentored a high school sophomore, and assisted a teenage mother coming out of foster care. Through a program at Porchlight Inc., she befriended a formerly homeless diabetic man. She donated $450,000 to Road Home, a nonprofit agency serving homeless families in Dane County. She has also supported the Boys and Girls Club of Dane County and Madison Prep, a charter school.

Burke joined with teacher Kate Brien to found AVID/TOPS, a non-profit dedicated to help kids striving to be the first in their family to attend college. Burke began volunteering as a teen, teaching tennis in inner-city Milwaukee playgrounds. In 2011, Madison Magazine named Burke one of their "People of the Year". She lives in Madison, Wisconsin.

Party political offices
Preceded by Tom Barrett	Democratic nominee for Governor of Wisconsin; 2014	Succeeded by Tony Evers
