= John Dickert =

American politician (born 1962)

John T. Dickert
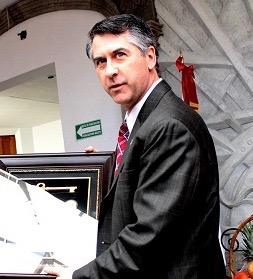
- Dickert in 2014

57th Mayor of Racine, Wisconsin
- In office May 19, 2009 – July 16, 2017
- Preceded by: Tom Friedel (interim); Gary Becker (elected)
- Succeeded by: Dennis Wiser (acting); Cory Mason (elected)

Personal details
- Born: December 6, 1962 (age 63) Racine, Wisconsin, U.S.
- Party: Democratic
- Spouse: Teresa Murphy
- Children: 2
- Education: University of Wisconsin–La Crosse
- Website: Official Website

John T. Dickert (born December 6, 1962) is an American Democratic politician and was the 57th mayor of Racine, Wisconsin. He subsequently served as administrator of the Division of State and Local Finance in the Wisconsin Department of Revenue, appointed by Governor Tony Evers in May 2019.

He was elected mayor in a 2009 special election and was re-elected twice, in 2011 and 2015. He resigned as mayor in 2017 to work as executive director of the Great Lakes and St. Lawrence Cities Initiative.

== Early life ==
Dickert's familial roots extend three generations in Racine. In 1880, his great-great-grandfather arrived and started a family and small plumbing business, Dickert Brothers Plumbing Company. That business lasted more than a century. John Dickert was born December 6, 1962. He attended St. Catherine's High School and received his bachelor's degree in political science and mass communication from the University of Wisconsin–La Crosse. While in college, he was elected to the La Crosse County Board of Supervisors. Dickert then worked as an intern for Congressman Les Aspin in Washington D.C. Dickert returned to Racine to serve as Congressional District Director for State Assemblyman Peter Barca. Dickert ran twice in Democratic primary elections for Wisconsin State Assembly in the 61st district against Robert Turner, but was defeated both times. Dickert became a real estate agent for Coldwell Banker in 2003 and First Weber in 2007, then ran for mayor of Racine in 2009.

== Mayoralty ==
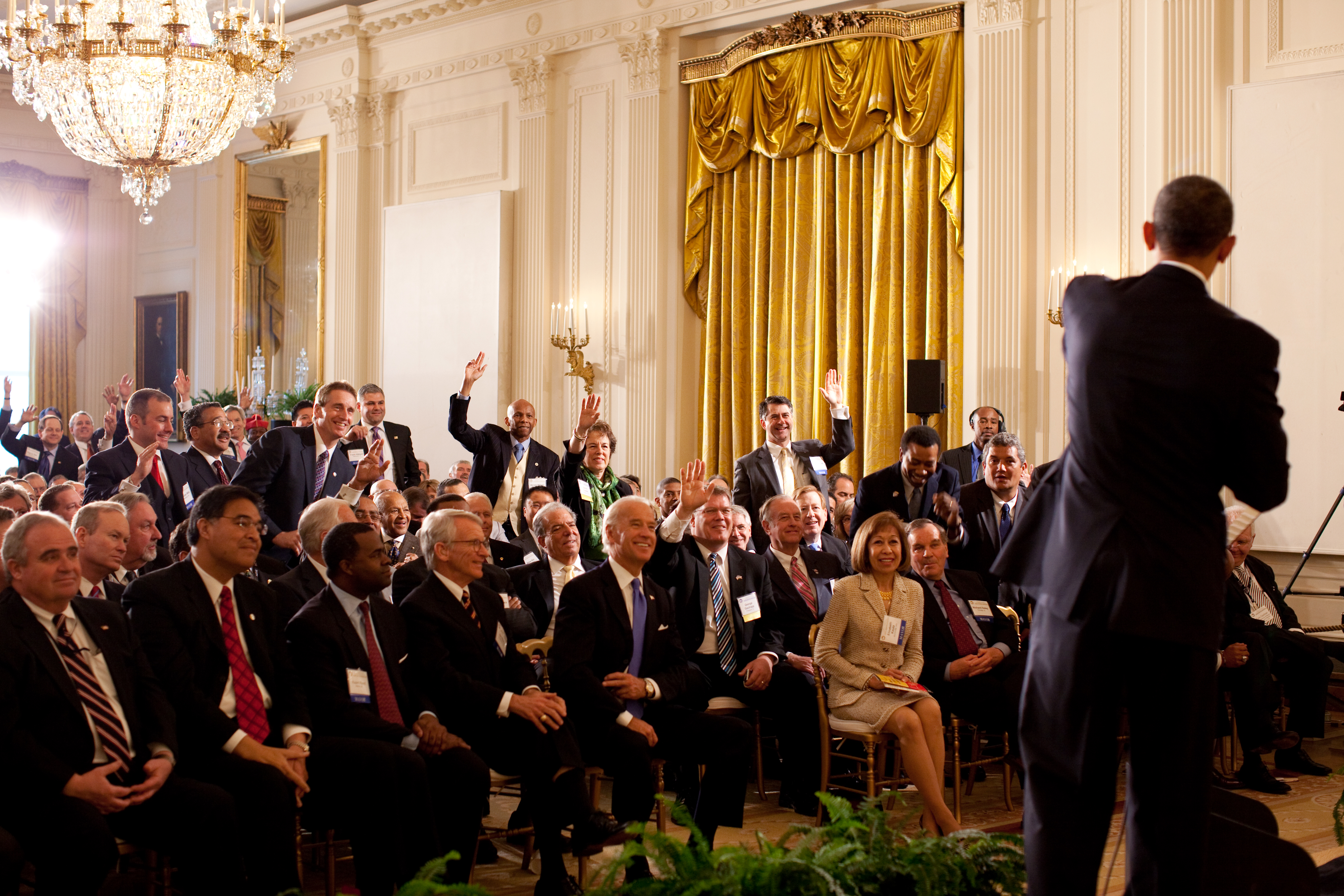
Dickert and other mayors meet with President Obama in the East Room of the White House

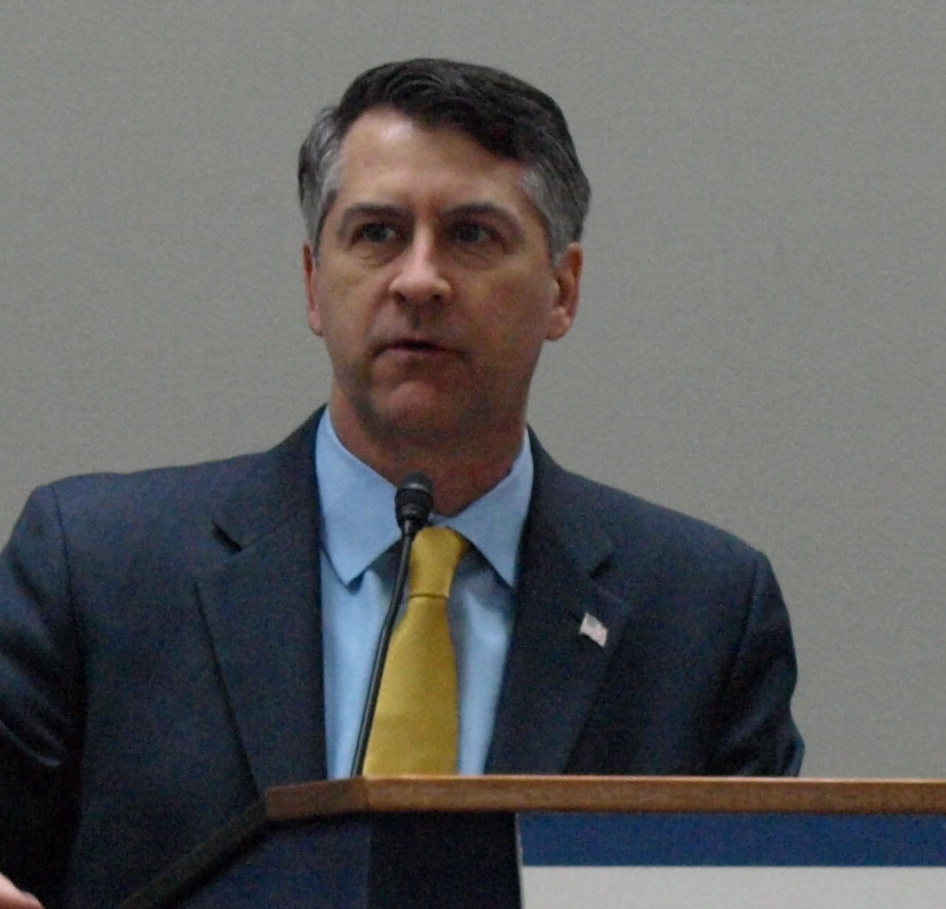
Dickert in 2015

John Dickert served as mayor from May 2009 through July 2017. He was first elected to finish the term of Gary E. Becker, who had resigned in January after being charged with six felonies. He was elected on May 5, 2009, and was inaugurated on May 19, taking over from acting Mayor Tom Friedel. After winning regular elections in August 2011 and again in August 2015, Dickert ultimately served one full term and two partial terms.

While mayor, Dickert served as president of the Urban Alliance, a group of mayors from Wisconsin's largest metro regions, from its creation in 2011 until he was succeeded by Manitowoc mayor Justin Nickels in 2014. Dickert also served on the United States Conference of Mayors, primarily as Vice Chair of the Metro Economies Committee, as well as on its Mayors Water Council. Additionally, he was a member of Governor Scott Walker’s Wisconsin Coastal Management Council.

On March 27, 2017, Dickert announced his plans to resign from the mayoralty to take the position of executive director at the Great Lakes and St. Lawrence Cities Initiative, a binational group of U.S. and Canadian "mayors and local officials working to advance the protection and restoration of the Great Lakes and St. Lawrence River." Dickert had previously served on the organization's board of directors, and was the chairman of the board between 2014 and 2015.

Dickert formally resigned on July 16, 2017, and Dennis Wiser, previously president of the Racine City Council, automatically became acting mayor. Democrat Cory Mason was elected Mayor of Racine, Wisconsin on November 7, 2017, after winning the special election.

== Department of Revenue ==
In May 2019, Dickert was tapped by newly inaugurated Governor Tony Evers and newly appointed Secretary of Revenue Peter W. Barca to serve as administrator for the Division of State and Local Finance in the Wisconsin Department of Revenue. The Division of State and Local Finance is responsible for administering the state's property tax valuation and assessment program, with emphasis on properly valuing commercial, manufacturing, and other special properties. On his appointment, Secretary Barca said: "John's background as the former three-term mayor of the City of Racine along with his experience in residential and commercial real estate provides him with a unique perspective for this position. His keen understanding of local government and the issues facing local government officials will help us to better serve their needs and, more importantly, their citizens."

== Personal life ==
Dickert lives in Racine with his wife and two children Riley and Eleanor.

== Electoral history ==
=== Wisconsin Assembly (1990, 2002) ===
Wisconsin Assembly 61st District Election, 1990
Party	Candidate	Votes	%	±%
Primary Election
Democratic	Robert L. Turner	2,056	46.14%	
Democratic	John Dickert	1,193	26.77%	
Republican	Roderick D. Wilhelmi	722	16.20%	
Democratic	Cathleen A. Cotter	485	10.88%	
Total votes		4,456	100.0%	
General Election
Democratic	Robert L. Turner	7,232	62.09%	
Republican	Roderick D. Wilhelmi	4,415	37.91%	
Total votes		11,647	100.0%	
Democratic hold				

Wisconsin Assembly 61st District Election, 2002
Party	Candidate	Votes	%	±%
Primary Election
Democratic	Robert L. Turner (incumbent)	3,194	52.25%	
Democratic	John Dickert	2,919	47.75%	
Total votes		6,113	100.0%	
General Election
Democratic	Robert L. Turner (incumbent)	9,525	98.15%	−1.41%
	Write-ins	180	1.85%	+1.41%
Total votes		9,705	100.0%	-29.48%
Democratic hold				

=== Racine Mayor (2009–2015) ===
Racine Mayoral Special Election, 2009
Party	Candidate	Votes	%	±%
Primary Election, April 7, 2009
Democratic	John Dickert	2,307	23.09%	
Democratic	Robert L. Turner	1,671	16.73%	
Democratic	Kimberly Plache	1,313	13.14%	
Independent	James Spangenberg	1,249	12.50%	
Independent	Greg Helding	1,150	11.51%	
Independent	Pete Karas	851	8.52%	
Independent	Jody Harding	658	6.59%	
Independent	Q.A. Shakoor II	414	4.14%	
Independent	Lesia Hill-Driver	161	1.61%	
Independent	Raymond Fay	148	1.48%	
Independent	Jaimie Charon	69	0.69%	
Total votes		9,991	100.0%	
Special Election, May 5, 2009
Democratic	John Dickert	6,027	55.46%	
Democratic	Robert L. Turner	4,841	44.54%	
Plurality		1,186	10.91%	
Total votes		10,868	100.0%	
Democratic hold				

Racine Mayoral Election, 2011
Party	Candidate	Votes	%	±%
General Election, April 5, 2011
Democratic	John Dickert (incumbent)	11,379	72.87%	+17.41%
Independent	Eric Marcus	4,237	27.13%	
Plurality		7,142	45.74%	+34.83%
Total votes		15,616	100.0%	+43.69%
Democratic hold				

Racine Mayoral Election, 2015
Party	Candidate	Votes	%	±%
General Election, April 7, 2015
Democratic	John Dickert (incumbent)	5,392	54.26%	−18.61%
Independent	Melvin Hargrove	4,546	45.74%	
Plurality		846	8.51%	-37.23%
Total votes		9,938	100.0%	-36.36%
Democratic hold				

Political offices
Preceded by Tom Friedel (interim); Gary Becker (elected)	Mayor of Racine, Wisconsin; 2009 – 2017	Succeeded by Dennis Wiser (acting); Cory Mason (elected)
