= Cory Mason =

21st century American politician

Cory H. Mason IV
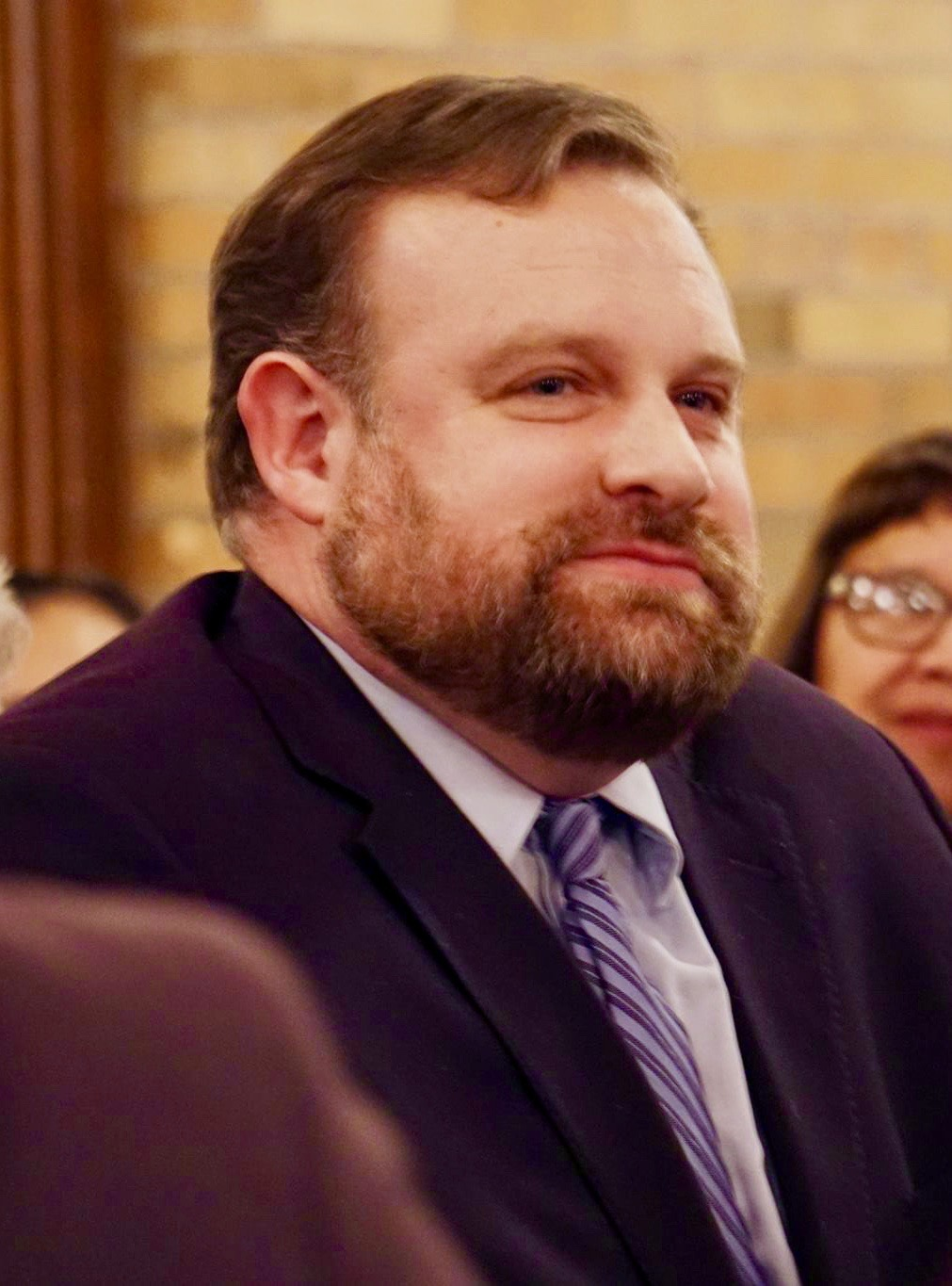

58th Mayor of Racine, Wisconsin
- Incumbent
- Assumed office November 7, 2017
- Preceded by: Dennis Wiser (acting); John Dickert (elected)

Member of the Wisconsin State Assembly
- In office January 7, 2013 – January 15, 2018
- Preceded by: Samantha Kerkman
- Succeeded by: Greta Neubauer
- Constituency: 66th district
- In office January 3, 2007 – January 7, 2013
- Preceded by: John Lehman
- Succeeded by: Tom Weatherston
- Constituency: 62nd district

Personal details
- Born: Cory H. Mason IV; January 25, 1973 (age 53) Racine, Wisconsin, U.S.
- Party: Democratic
- Spouse: Rebecca Mason
- Children: 3
- Relatives: Christopher E. Mason (brother)
- Education: University of Wisconsin–Madison

Cory H. Mason IV (born January 25, 1973) is an American Democratic politician and the mayor of Racine, Wisconsin, since 2017. Before being elected mayor, he represented Racine for 11 years in the Wisconsin State Assembly, from 2007 to 2017.

== Early life and education ==
Mason was born in Racine and graduated from Case High School. He then received a bachelor of arts degree in philosophy from the University of Wisconsin–Madison.

During the 2000 presidential election, Mason was listed as a Wisconsin state co-chair of GoreNet. GoreNet was a young Americans focused group that supported the Al Gore campaign with a focus on grassroots and online organizing as well as hosting small dollar donor events.

== Wisconsin State Assembly ==
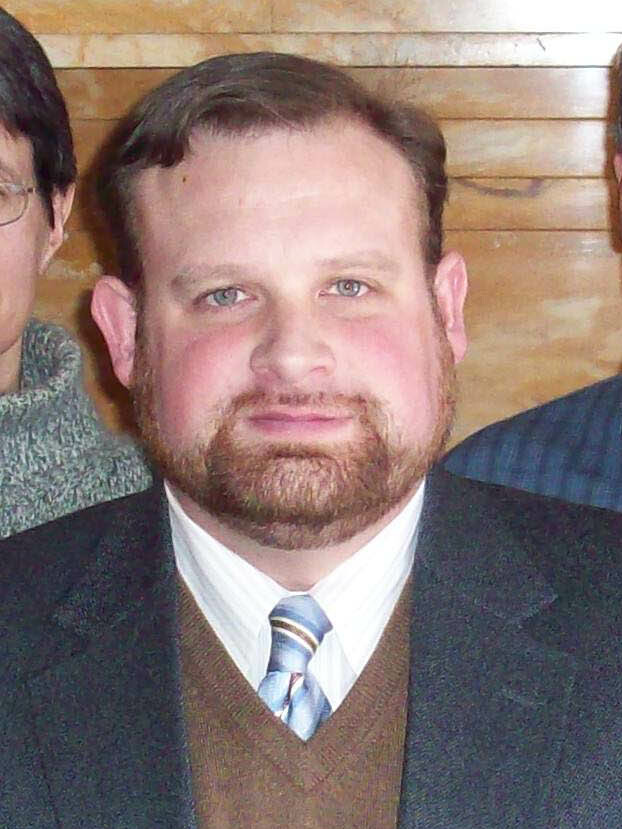
Mason in 2009

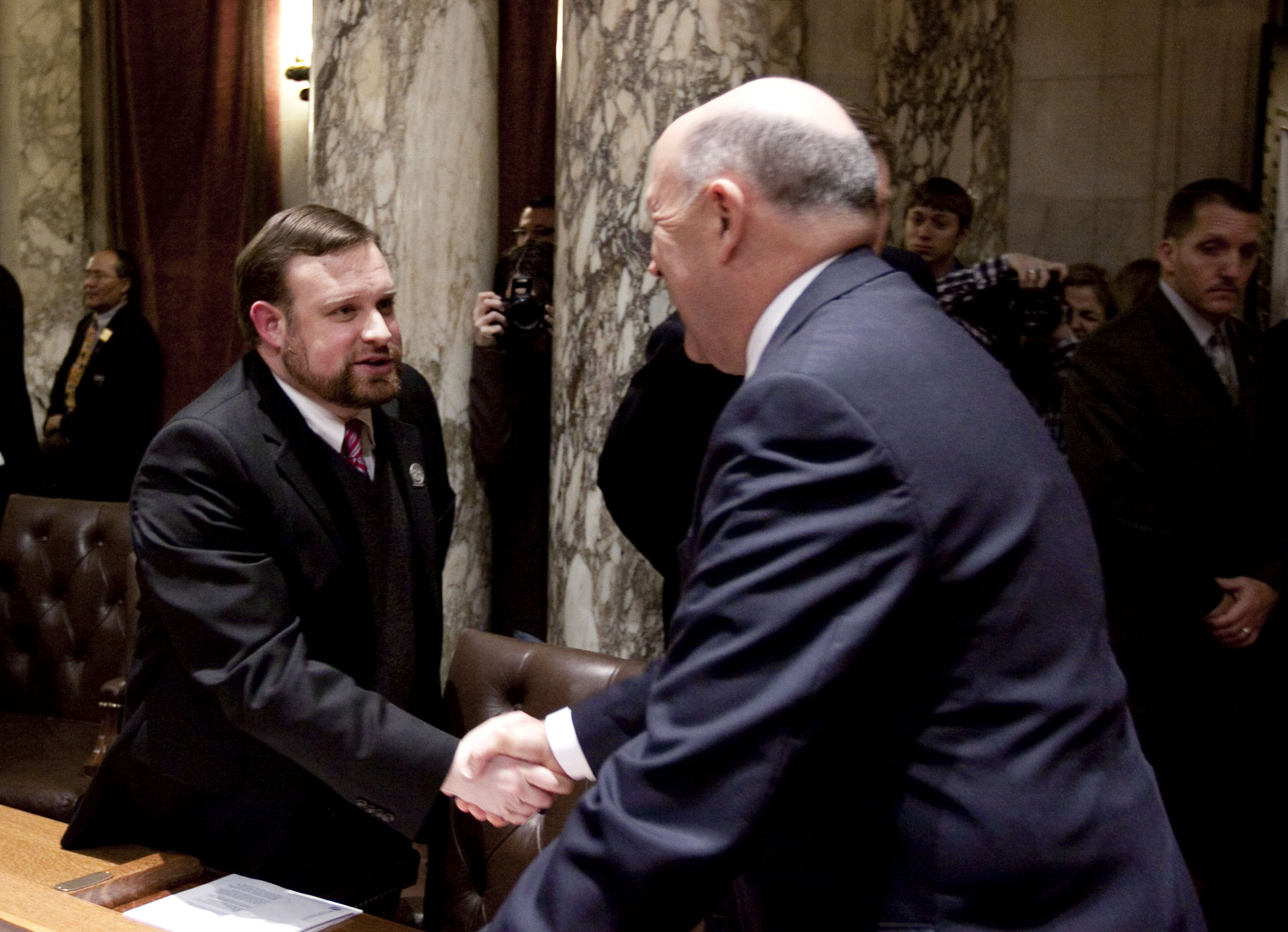
Mason (left) shaking hands with Governor Jim Doyle in 2009

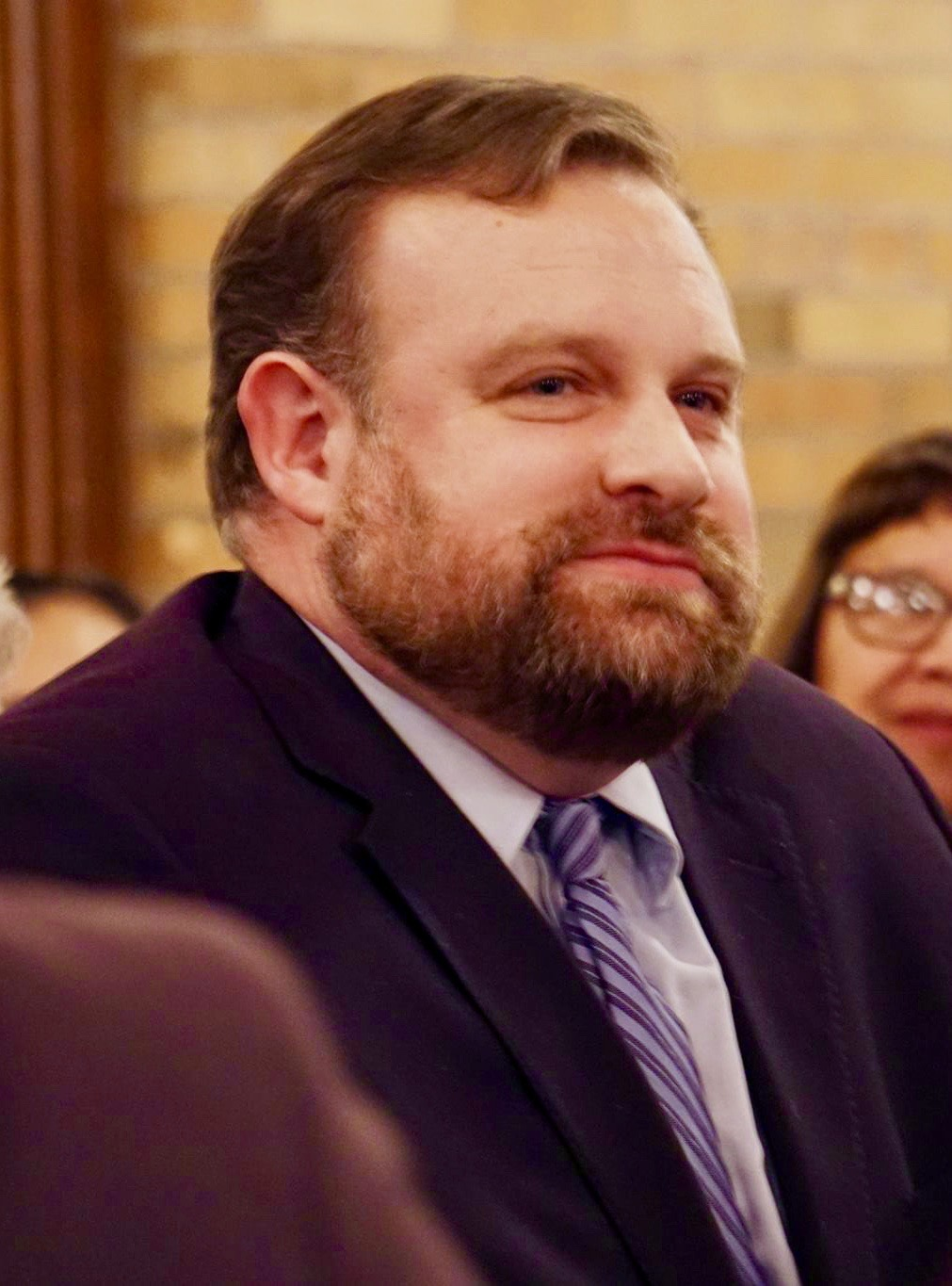
Mason in 2018

While in the assembly, Mason served as the ranking Assembly Democratic member of the Assembly Committee on Environment and Forestry, the Joint Legislative Council, and Joint Survey Committee on Retirement Systems. He also served on the Assembly Committee on Tourism.

Mason was named the 2009-2010 Legislator of the Year by the Wisconsin Technical College District Boards Association for his support of Wisconsin's technical colleges. Other awards include the 2014 Children's Champion Policy Award from Children's Hospital of Wisconsin, the 2013 Friend of the UW Award by the United Council of UW Students, and the River Champion Award by the River Alliance of Wisconsin. Mason was named 2012 Legislator of the Year by the Professional Fire Fighters of Wisconsin and was named to the Conservation Honor Roll for 2011-2012 by the Wisconsin League of Conservation Voters. He was also given an Award of Merit by the Wisconsin Association for Career and Technical Education.

== Mayoral candidacy ==
Mason ran for mayor of Racine in 2017 for a special election to complete the term of the previous mayor, John Dickert. Mason won with the largest share of votes in both the primary and general elections.

== Mayoralty ==
Mason's mayoral administration has thus far resulted in increased residential and commercial development such as the Gold Medal Loft project in Uptown Racine and the construction of apartments at the former Walker Manufacturing site along the shores of Lake Michigan in Downtown Racine. Mason has also overseen downtown investment from global technology company Foxconn.

He was re-elected in 2019 and 2023.

== Electoral history ==
=== Wisconsin Assembly 62nd District (2006–2010) ===
Year	Election	Date	Elected				Defeated				Total	Plurality
2006	General	Nov. 7	Cory Mason	Democratic	10,302	52.37%	Van H. Wanggaard	Rep.	9,363	47.60%	19,671	939
2008	General	Nov. 4	Cory Mason (inc)	Democratic	17,892	84.54%	Keith R. Deschler	Lib.	3,217	15.20%	21,164	14,675
2010	General	Nov. 2	Cory Mason (inc)	Democratic	10,455	53.78%	Chris Wright	Rep.	8,572	44.10%	19,439	1,883
2010	General	Nov. 2	Cory Mason (inc)	Democratic	10,455	53.78%	Tony Decubellis	Lib.	403	2.07%	19,439	1,883

=== Wisconsin Assembly 66th District (2012–2016) ===
Year	Election	Date	Elected				Defeated				Total	Plurality
2012	General	Nov. 7	Cory Mason	Democratic	16,830	98.65%	--unopposed--				17,060	16,600
2014	General	Nov. 4	Cory Mason (inc)	Democratic	12,062	80.73%	George Meyers	Lib.	2,781	18.61%	14,942	9,281
2016	General	Nov. 8	Cory Mason (inc)	Democratic	13,526	81.32%	George Meyers	Lib.	3,107	18.68%	16,633	10,419

=== Racine Mayor (2017–2023) ===
Year	Election	Date	Elected				Defeated				Total	Plurality
2017	Primary	Sep. 19	Cory Mason	Democratic	2,896	38.54%	Sandy Weidner	Ind.	2,496	33.22%	7,514	400
2017	Primary	Sep. 19	Cory Mason	Democratic	2,896	38.54%	Melvin Hargrove	Ind.	1,690	22.49%	7,514	400
2017	Primary	Sep. 19	Cory Mason	Democratic	2,896	38.54%	Wally Rendon	Dem.	231	3.07%	7,514	400
2017	Primary	Sep. 19	Cory Mason	Democratic	2,896	38.54%	Fabi Maldonaldo	Grn.	180	2.40%	7,514	400
2017	Primary	Sep. 19	Cory Mason	Democratic	2,896	38.54%	Austin K. Rodriguez	Dem.	21	0.28%	7,514	400
2017	Special	Oct. 17	Cory Mason	Democratic	5,456	55.40%	Sandy Weidner	Ind.	4,392	44.60%	9,848	1,064
2019	General	Apr. 2	Cory Mason (inc)	Democratic	6,243	72.09%	Sandy Weidner (write-in)	Ind.	2,417	27.91%	8,660	3,826
2023	Primary	Feb. 21	Cory Mason (inc)	Democratic	3,607	42.62%	Henry Perez	Ind.	2,561	30.26%	8,464	1,046
2023	Primary	Feb. 21	Cory Mason (inc)	Democratic	3,607	42.62%	Jim DeMatthew	Dem.	2,274	26.87%	8,464	1,046
2023	General	Apr. 4	Cory Mason (inc)	Democratic	8,596	57.08%	Henry Perez	Ind.	6,376	42.34%	15,060	2,220

Wisconsin State Assembly
Preceded by John Lehman	Member of the Wisconsin State Assembly from the 62nd district January 3, 2007 – January 7, 2013	Succeeded by Tom Weatherston
Preceded by Samantha Kerkman	Member of the Wisconsin State Assembly from the 66th district January 7, 2013 – January 15, 2018	Succeeded by Greta Neubauer
Political offices
Preceded by Dennis Wiser (acting); John Dickert (elected)	Mayor of the Racine, Wisconsin; November 7, 2017 – present	Incumbent
