= George Petak =

American politician (1949–2024)

Member of the Wisconsin Senate from the 21st district
- In office January 7, 1991 – June 14, 1996
- Preceded by: Joseph A. Strohl
- Succeeded by: Kimberly Plache

Member of the Racine Unified School Board
- In office 1983–1991

Personal details
- Born: November 6, 1949 Warren, Ohio, U.S.
- Died: December 24, 2024 (aged 75) Colorado, U.S.
- Party: Republican
- Spouse: Nancy Petak
- Children: 3
- Education: Kent State University
- Occupation: Politician, consultant

George Anthony Petak Jr. (November 6, 1949 – December 24, 2024) was an American Republican politician and political consultant from Racine, Wisconsin. He served five and a half years in the Wisconsin Senate, representing Wisconsin's 21st Senate district from 1991 until he was recalled from office in June 1996. He was the first Wisconsin state legislator to be removed from office by recall election; he was recalled over his decisive vote in favor of the sales tax plan which funded construction of Miller Park.

== Background ==
Born in Warren, Ohio, Petak graduated from Kent State University. He was hired by Ametek's Lamb Electric division in 1973 and worked in several administrative positions. In 1976, he moved to Sturtevant, Wisconsin to take on the role of quality control manager at an Ametek manufacturing plant in neighboring Racine.

Petak died from glioblastoma—a form of brain cancer—on December 24, 2024, at the age of 75.

== Political career ==
In 1983, Petak was elected to the Racine Unified School Board. He was re-elected in 1986 and 1989. In 1990, he was elected to the Wisconsin State Senate, defeating the incumbent Senate Majority Leader Joseph A. Strohl, who was enmeshed in controversy over his (Strohl's) opposition to a parental consent law for minor girls seeking an abortion.

Petak won re-election in 1994, but ran into controversy in October 1995, when he changed his vote on a funding bill for the Miller Park stadium. Miller Park was being planned to replace the forty-year-old Milwaukee County Stadium and was being pushed by Republican Governor Tommy Thompson and Milwaukee Brewers owner and future-Commissioner of Baseball, Bud Selig. Petak had promised his constituents that he would vote against the bill, but changed his mind based on the belief that the Brewers would leave Wisconsin if a new stadium wasn't built.

Petak's deciding vote supported a 0.1 percent sales tax increase for the five counties in the proposed stadium's vicinity, including Petak's home county, Racine. Petak faced immediate outrage in his home district, and local Democrats were energized to collect signatures for a recall petition. The petition was certified on March 26, 1996, and a recall election was ordered for June. Nine months after his vote on the stadium tax, Petak became the first Wisconsin state legislator to be removed from office in a recall election, when he was defeated by Democratic State Representative Kimberly Plache.

A few weeks after his election loss, Petak was appointed deputy director of the Wisconsin Housing and Economic Development Authority, a quasi-public agency established by the Wisconsin Legislature, where one third of the Board of Directors are Wisconsin legislators. Petak had served on WHEDA's board of directors for six years and had oversight of WHEDA while he was Chairman of the Senate Business, Economic Development and Urban Affairs Committee. The appointment was criticized at the time as a political favor for a former senator who lost his seat over a controversial vote.

Petak briefly flirted with a run for Congress in 1998, after 1st Congressional District incumbent Mark Neumann decided to run for U.S. Senate instead of seeking re-election. Petak ultimately chose not to run and accused his would-be Republican primary opponent, future-Speaker of the U.S. House of Representatives Paul Ryan, of exploiting the stadium tax controversy.

Petak instead went into government affairs consulting in Madison, Wisconsin and started his own consulting business in 2009. As of 2016, Petak returned to the Wisconsin Housing and Economic Development Authority as Senior Business and Community Engagement Officer.

== Electoral history ==
Wisconsin Senate 21st District Election, 1990
Party	Candidate	Votes	%	±%
Primary Election
Democratic	Joseph Strohl (incumbent)	4,821	61.70%	
Republican	George Petak	2,992	38.30%	
Total votes		7,813	'100.0%'	
General Election
Republican	George Petak	23,216	58.66%	
Democratic	Joseph Strohl (incumbent)	16,360	41.34%	
Total votes		39,576	'100.0%'	
Republican gain from Democratic				

Wisconsin Senate 21st District Election, 1994
Party	Candidate	Votes	%	±%
Primary Election
Republican	George Petak (incumbent)	4,495	62.11%	
Democratic	Sally Henzl	2,196	37.89%	
Total votes		6,691	'100.0%'	
General Election
Republican	George Petak (incumbent)	28,356	62.11%	+3.45%
Democratic	Sally Henzl	17,295	37.89%	−3.45%
Total votes		45,651	'100.0%'	+15.35%
Republican hold				

Wisconsin Senate 21st District Recall Election, 1996
Party	Candidate	Votes	%	±%
Primary Election
Republican	George Petak (incumbent)	14,147	60.20%	
Republican	William A. Pangman	5,174	22.02%	
Democratic	Kimberly Plache	4,016	17.09%	
Libertarian	Todd Mascaretti	163	0.07%	
Total votes		23,500	'100.0%'	
General Election
Democratic	Kimberly Plache	21,045	51.22%	+13.33%
Republican	George Petak (incumbent)	19,318	47.02%	−15.09%
Libertarian	Todd Mascaretti	725	1.76%	
Total votes		41,088	'100.0%'	-10.00%
Democratic gain from Republican				
