= Wisconsin's 21st Senate district =

American legislative district in southeast Wisconsin

Wisconsin's 21st State Senate district
- 2024 map defined in 2023 Wisc. Act 94; 2022 map defined in Johnson v. Wisconsin Elections Commission; 2011 map was defined in 2011 Wisc. Act 43 composed of Assembly districts 61, 62, and 63
Senator
Van H. Wanggaard; R–Racine
since January 5, 2015 (11 years, 53 days)
- Demographics: 74% White; 9.76% Black; 10.86% Hispanic; 3.71% Asian; 1.91% Native American; 0.11% Hawaiian/Pacific Islander
- Population (2020) • Voting age: 179,184; 139,923
- Website: Official website
- Notes: Southeast Wisconsin

The 21st Senate district of Wisconsin is one of 33 districts in the Wisconsin Senate. Located in southeastern Wisconsin, the district comprises northeast Racine County and southwest Milwaukee County. It includes the city of Franklin, the northern half of the city of Racine, the western half of the city of Greenfield, and part of southwest Milwaukee, as well as the villages of Greendale, Hales Corners, Caledonia, Wind Point, and North Bay.

== Current elected officials ==
Van H. Wanggaard is the senator representing the 21st district. He was elected to his first term in the 2010 general election, but was removed from office in a recall election in 2012. He subsequently was returned to office in the 2014 general election, and is now in his third four-year term.

Each Wisconsin State Senate district is composed of three Wisconsin State Assembly districts. The 21st Senate district comprises the 61st, 62nd, and 63rd Assembly districts. The current representatives of those districts are:

- Assembly District 61: Bob Donovan (R–Greenfield)
- Assembly District 62: Angelina Cruz (D–Racine)
- Assembly District 63: Robert Wittke (R–Caledonia)

The district, in its current boundaries, crosses three congressional districts. Most of the district is contained within Wisconsin's 1st congressional district, which is represented by U.S. Representative Bryan Steil. The portion of the district in Greenfield falls within Wisconsin's 5th congressional district, represented by Scott L. Fitzgerald. The portion of the district in the city of Milwaukee falls within Wisconsin's 4th congressional district, represented by Gwen Moore.

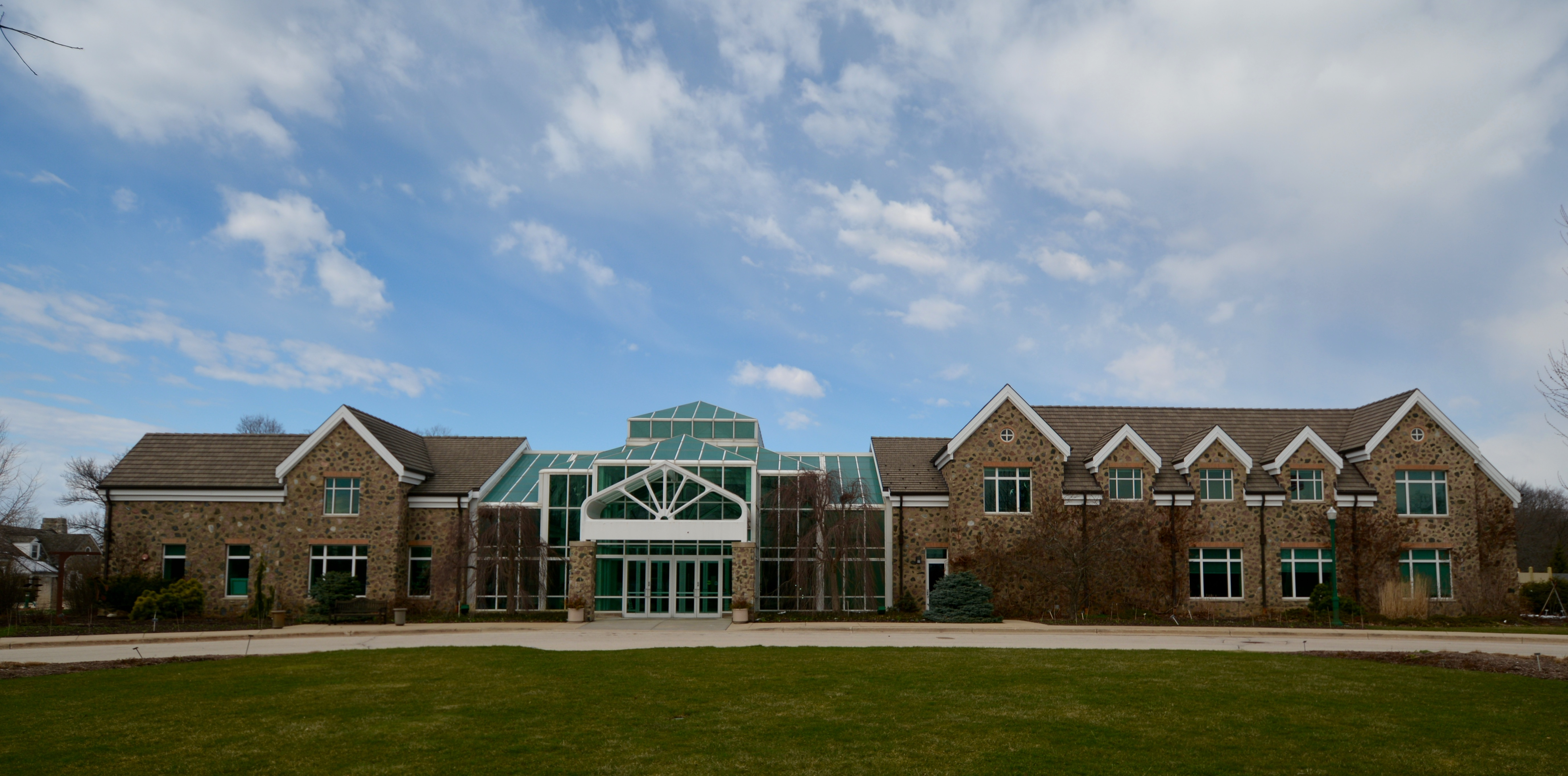
Boerner Botanical Gardens in Hales Corners

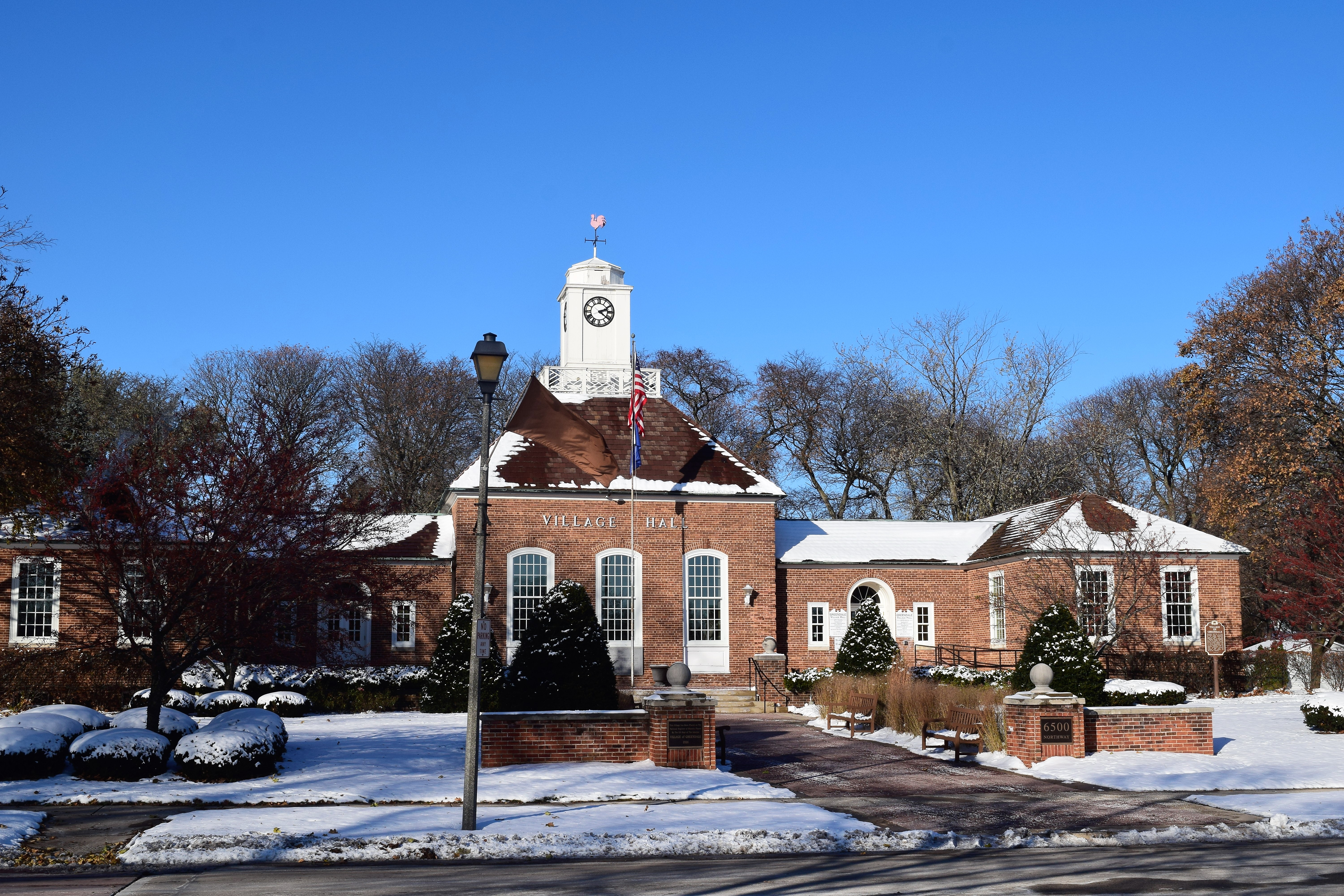
Greendale village hall

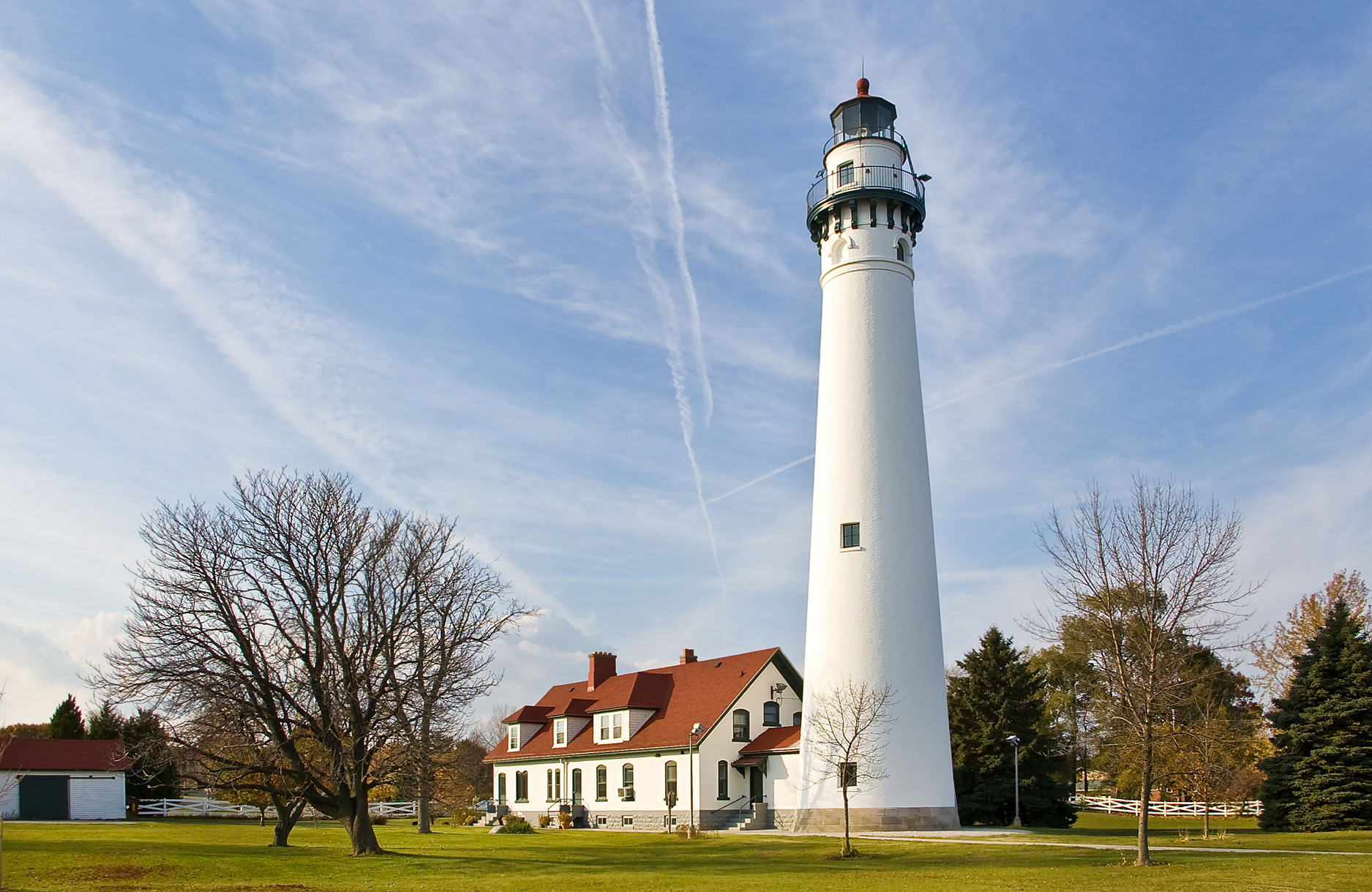
Wind Point Lighthouse

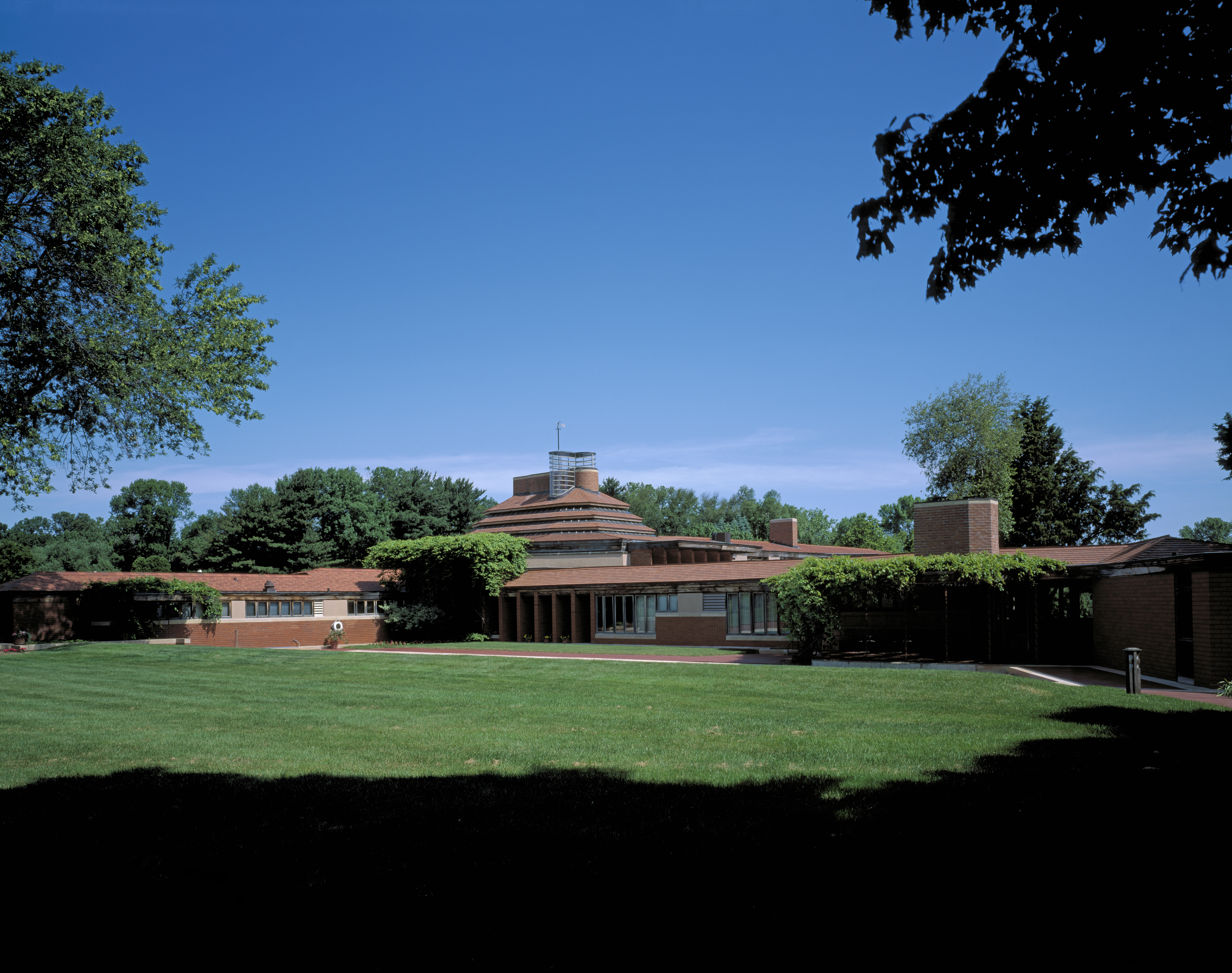
Wingspread building in Wind Point

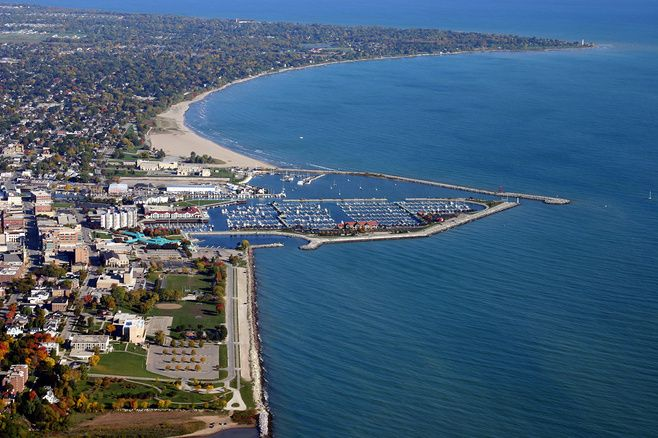
Aerial view of Racine lakefront with Wind Point in background

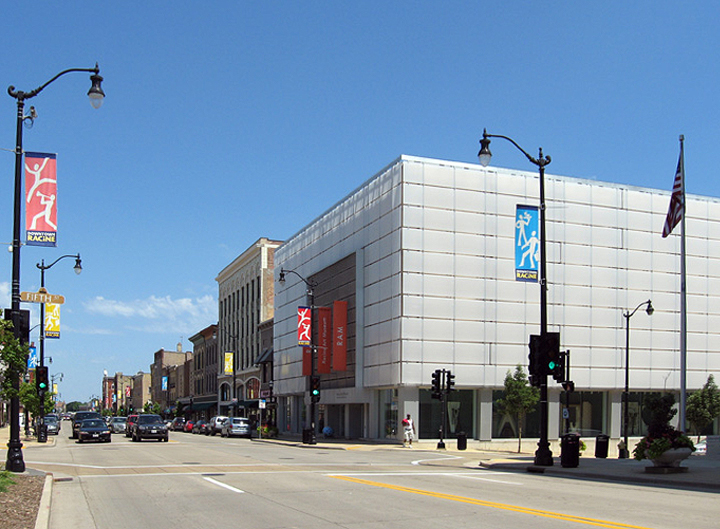
Racine Art Museum in the Old Main Street Historic District

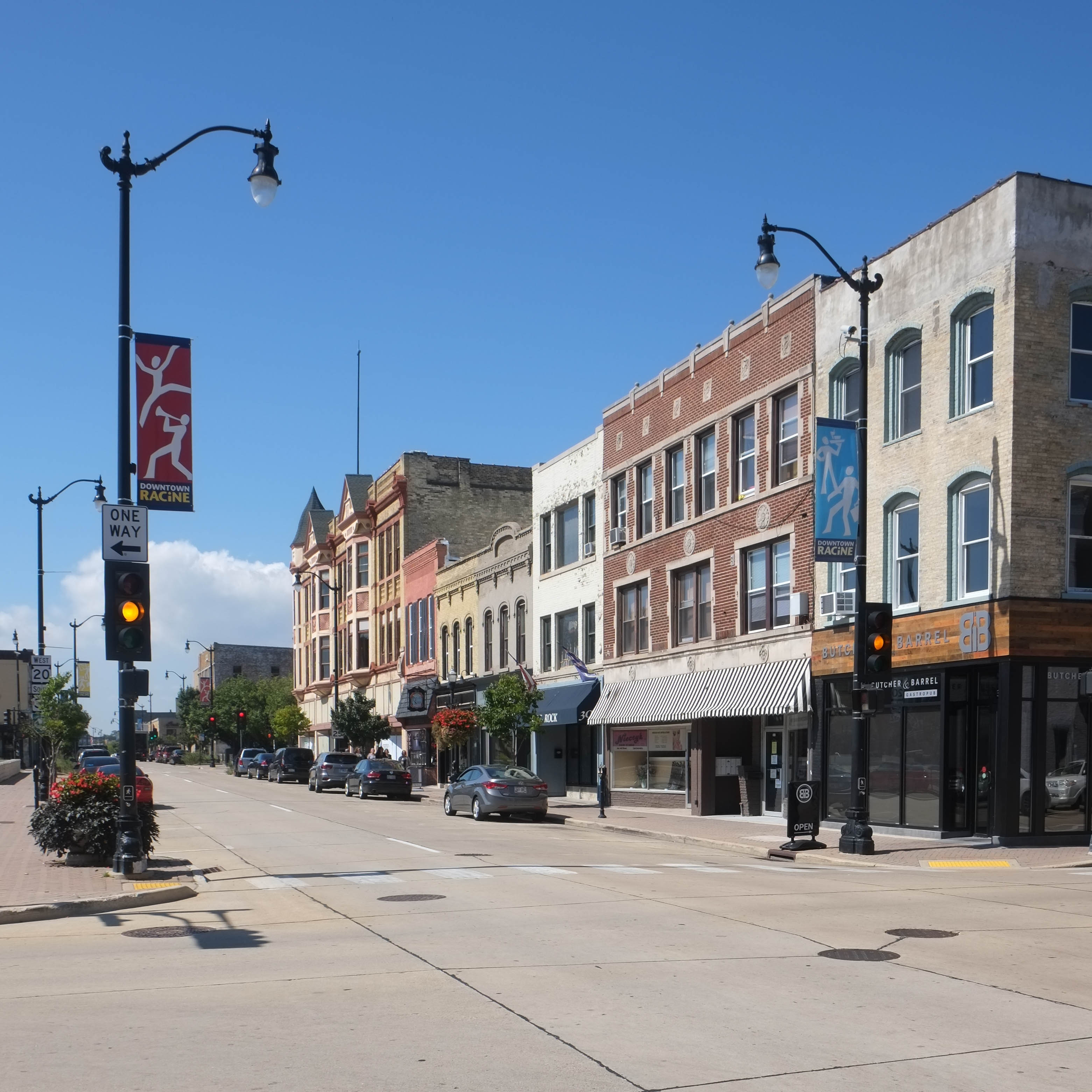
Historic Sixth Street Business District

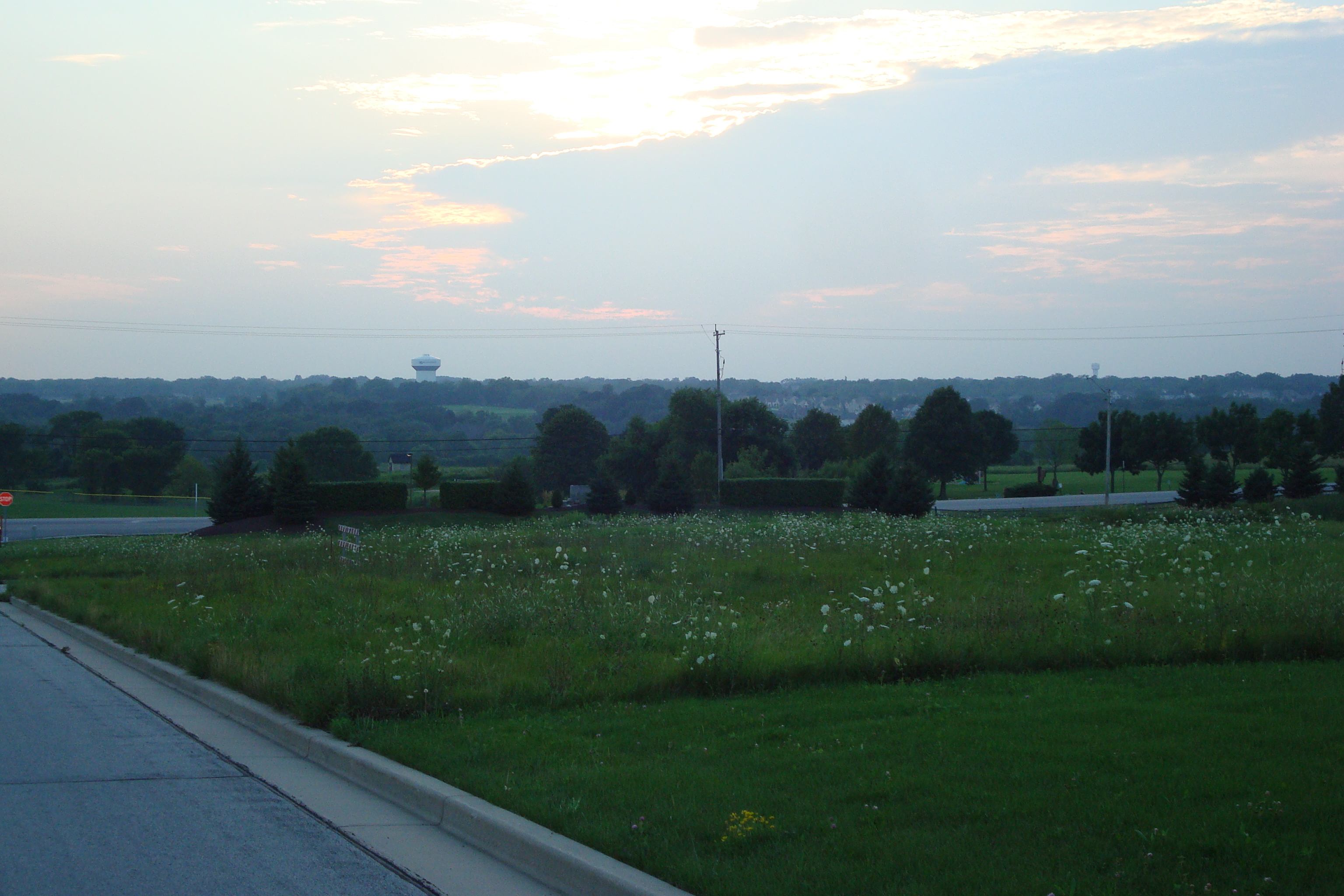
Root River valley in Franklin

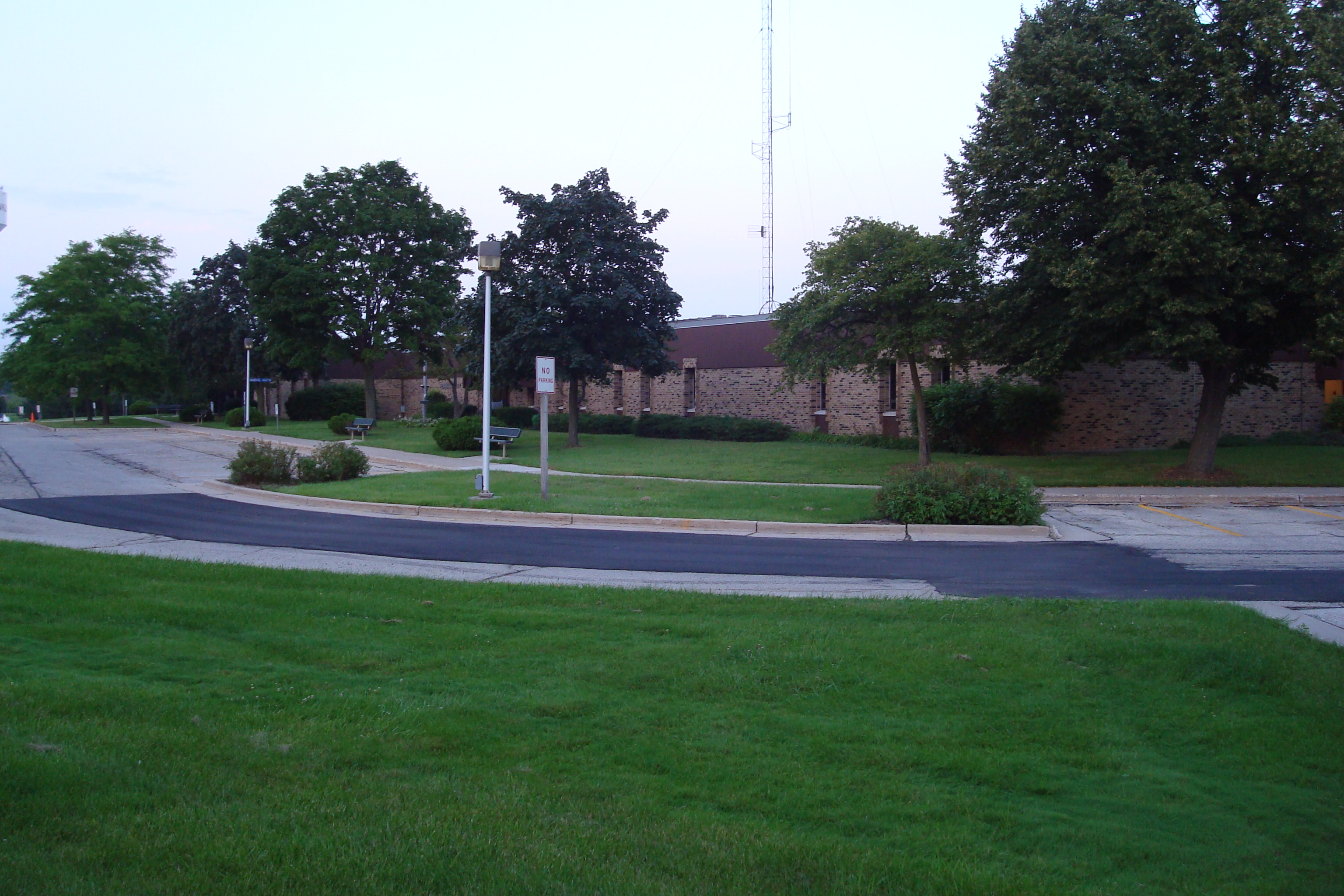
Franklin City Hall

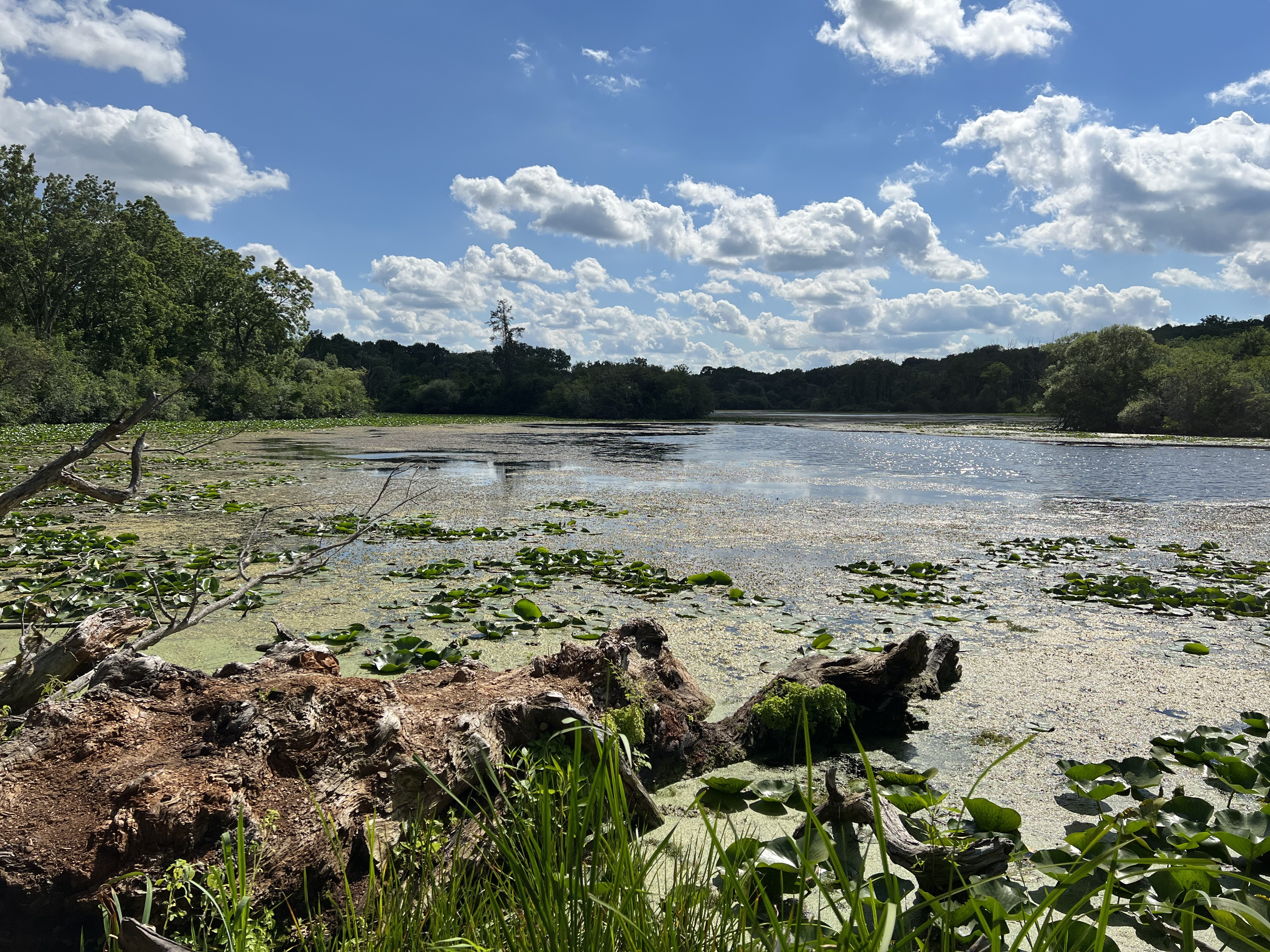
Whitnall Park

== Recalls ==
The 21st Senate district is unique in Wisconsin recall history. In 1996, it became the first district in which a Wisconsin state legislator was successfully removed from office via recall election, when Kimberly Plache defeated George Petak. With the recall of Van H. Wanggaard in 2012, it became the only Wisconsin district where there have been more than one successful recall elections.

== Boundaries ==
As with all state senate and assembly seats, the boundaries of the 21st have moved over time during decennial redistricting. Senators of previous eras have represented different geographic areas.

The district was created after the 1850 census and reapportionment and was drawn for Winnebago County, in central Wisconsin. The inaugural holder was Coles Bashford in the 6th session of the Wisconsin Legislature, 1853.

In the 19th century, the district included at various times Marathon, Oconto, Shawano and Waupaca counties, and was located within the now-defunct 9th Congressional District

For most of the 20th century, the district covered the city of Racine and Racine County, in southeastern Wisconsin, within the boundaries of the 1st Congressional District.

In redistricting after the 2010 census, the city of Racine was mostly removed and rural and suburban portions of Kenosha County were added to the district, turning the 21st into a safe Republican seat.

The 2024 redistricting again dramatically reshaped the district, removing all of Kenosha County and most of Racine County. The district instead moved back into the city of Racine, comprising the city's north side and stretching north into southwest Milwaukee County. Under the new map, it is projected to be one of the most competitive districts in the state Senate.

== Past senators ==
The 21st senate district has had several notable officeholders, including American Civil War General John Azor Kellogg and Wisconsin Governors Coles Bashford and Walter Samuel Goodland.

A list of all previous senators from this district:

Senator	Party	Notes	Session	Years	District definition
District created by 1852 Wisc. Act 499.				1852	1852–1856 1856–1860 1861–1865 1866–1870; Winnebago County
Coles Bashford	Whig	Won 1852 election. Resigned 1855, elected Governor of Wisconsin.	6th	1853	1852–1856 1856–1860 1861–1865 1866–1870; Winnebago County
Coles Bashford	Whig	Won 1852 election. Resigned 1855, elected Governor of Wisconsin.	7th	1854	1852–1856 1856–1860 1861–1865 1866–1870; Winnebago County
Coles Bashford	Rep.	Won 1852 election. Resigned 1855, elected Governor of Wisconsin.	8th	1855	1852–1856 1856–1860 1861–1865 1866–1870; Winnebago County
John Fitzgerald	Dem.	Won 1855 special election.	9th	1856	1852–1856 1856–1860 1861–1865 1866–1870; Winnebago County
Edwin Wheeler	Rep.		10th	1857	1852–1856 1856–1860 1861–1865 1866–1870; Winnebago County
Edwin Wheeler	Rep.		11th	1858	1852–1856 1856–1860 1861–1865 1866–1870; Winnebago County
Ganem W. Washburn	Rep.		12th	1859	1852–1856 1856–1860 1861–1865 1866–1870; Winnebago County
Ganem W. Washburn	Rep.		13th	1860	1852–1856 1856–1860 1861–1865 1866–1870; Winnebago County
Horace O. Crane	Rep.	Resigned June 1861.	14th	1861	1852–1856 1856–1860 1861–1865 1866–1870; Winnebago County
Samuel M. Hay	Rep.	Won 1861 special election.	15th	1862	1852–1856 1856–1860 1861–1865 1866–1870; Winnebago County
Joseph B. Hamilton	Rep.		16th	1863	1852–1856 1856–1860 1861–1865 1866–1870; Winnebago County
Joseph B. Hamilton	Rep.		17th	1864	1852–1856 1856–1860 1861–1865 1866–1870; Winnebago County
George S. Barnum	Natl. Union		18th	1865	1852–1856 1856–1860 1861–1865 1866–1870; Winnebago County
George S. Barnum	Natl. Union		19th	1866	1852–1856 1856–1860 1861–1865 1866–1870; Winnebago County
George Gary	Natl. Union	Resigned Oct. 1867.	20th	1867	1852–1856 1856–1860 1861–1865 1866–1870; Winnebago County
William G. Ritch	Rep.	Won 1867 special election.	21st	1868	1852–1856 1856–1860 1861–1865 1866–1870; Winnebago County
Ira W. Fisher	Rep.		22nd	1869	1852–1856 1856–1860 1861–1865 1866–1870; Winnebago County
Ira W. Fisher	Rep.		23rd	1870	1852–1856 1856–1860 1861–1865 1866–1870; Winnebago County
James H. Foster	Rep.	Redistricted to 19th district.	24th	1871	1852–1856 1856–1860 1861–1865 1866–1870; Winnebago County
Myron Reed	Dem.		25th	1872	Marathon, Oconto, Shawano, Waupaca counties, and northern Outagamie County: Town of Black Creek; Town of Bovina; Town of Deer Creek; Town of Ellington; Town of Hortonia; Town of Liberty; Town of Maine; Town of Maple Creek; Town of Osborne; Town of Seymour; Ward 3, City of New London; & Lincoln County (organized 1876)
Myron H. McCord	Rep.		26th	1873	Marathon, Oconto, Shawano, Waupaca counties, and northern Outagamie County: Town of Black Creek; Town of Bovina; Town of Deer Creek; Town of Ellington; Town of Hortonia; Town of Liberty; Town of Maine; Town of Maple Creek; Town of Osborne; Town of Seymour; Ward 3, City of New London; & Lincoln County (organized 1876)
Myron H. McCord	Rep.		27th	1874	Marathon, Oconto, Shawano, Waupaca counties, and northern Outagamie County: Town of Black Creek; Town of Bovina; Town of Deer Creek; Town of Ellington; Town of Hortonia; Town of Liberty; Town of Maine; Town of Maple Creek; Town of Osborne; Town of Seymour; Ward 3, City of New London; & Lincoln County (organized 1876)
Willis C. Silverthorn	Dem.		28th	1875	Marathon, Oconto, Shawano, Waupaca counties, and northern Outagamie County: Town of Black Creek; Town of Bovina; Town of Deer Creek; Town of Ellington; Town of Hortonia; Town of Liberty; Town of Maine; Town of Maple Creek; Town of Osborne; Town of Seymour; Ward 3, City of New London; & Lincoln County (organized 1876)
Willis C. Silverthorn	Dem.		29th	1876	Marathon, Oconto, Shawano, Waupaca counties, and northern Outagamie County: Town of Black Creek; Town of Bovina; Town of Deer Creek; Town of Ellington; Town of Hortonia; Town of Liberty; Town of Maine; Town of Maple Creek; Town of Osborne; Town of Seymour; Ward 3, City of New London; & Lincoln County (organized 1876)
Henry Mumbrue	Lib. Rep.		30th	1877	Marathon, Portage, and Waupaca counties
Henry Mumbrue	Lib. Rep.		31st	1878	Marathon, Portage, and Waupaca counties
John Azor Kellogg	Rep.		32nd	1879	Marathon, Portage, and Waupaca counties
John Azor Kellogg	Rep.		33rd	1880	Marathon, Portage, and Waupaca counties
Charles F. Crosby	Rep.		34th	1881	Marathon, Portage, and Waupaca counties
Charles F. Crosby	Rep.		35th	1882	Marathon, Portage, and Waupaca counties
John Ringle	Dem.		36th	1883–1884	Shawano, Waupaca, and Marathon counties
John Ringle	Dem.		37th	1885–1886	Shawano, Waupaca, and Marathon counties
John E. Leahy	Rep.		38th	1887–1888	Shawano, Waupaca, and Marathon counties
John E. Leahy	Rep.		39th	1889–1890	Shawano and Waupaca counties, and eastern Marathon County: Town of Texas; Town of Easton; Town of Wausau; Town of Weston; Town of Norrie; Town of Pike Lake; Town of Kronenwetter; Town of Knowlton; City of Wausau
Joseph H. Woodnorth	Dem.		40th	1891–1892	Shawano and Waupaca counties, and eastern Marathon County: Town of Texas; Town of Easton; Town of Wausau; Town of Weston; Town of Norrie; Town of Pike Lake; Town of Kronenwetter; Town of Knowlton; City of Wausau
Joseph H. Woodnorth	Dem.		41st	1893–1894	Portage and Waushara counties, and western Waupaca County: Town of Dupont; Town of Helvetia; Town of St. Lawrence; Town of Waupaca; Town of Fremont; Town of Weyauwega; Town of Dayton; Town of Farmington; Town of Iola; Town of Scandinavia; Town of Harrison; Town of Wyoming; Town of Lind; Villages of Fremont; Villages of Weyauwega; City of Waupaca
John Phillips	Rep.		42nd	1895–1896	Portage and Waushara counties, and western Waupaca County: Town of Dupont; Town of Helvetia; Town of St. Lawrence; Town of Waupaca; Town of Fremont; Town of Weyauwega; Town of Dayton; Town of Farmington; Town of Iola; Town of Scandinavia; Town of Harrison; Town of Wyoming; Town of Lind; Villages of Fremont; Villages of Weyauwega; City of Waupaca
John Phillips	Rep.		43rd	1897–1898	1896–1901 1902–1911; Portage and Waupaca counties
William H. Hatton	Rep.		44th	1899–1900	1896–1901 1902–1911; Portage and Waupaca counties
William H. Hatton	Rep.		45th	1901–1902	1896–1901 1902–1911; Portage and Waupaca counties
William H. Hatton	Rep.		46th	1903–1904	1896–1901 1902–1911; Portage and Waupaca counties
William H. Hatton	Rep.		47th	1905–1906	1896–1901 1902–1911; Portage and Waupaca counties
Edward E. Browne	Rep.		48th	1907–1908	1896–1901 1902–1911; Portage and Waupaca counties
Edward E. Browne	Rep.		49th	1909–1910	1896–1901 1902–1911; Portage and Waupaca counties
Edward E. Browne	Rep.		50th	1911–1912	1896–1901 1902–1911; Portage and Waupaca counties
Edward F. Kileen	Rep.		51st	1913–1914	Waushara, Adams, Juneau, and Marquette counties
Frank H. Hanson	Rep.		52nd	1915–1916	Waushara, Adams, Juneau, and Marquette counties
Frank H. Hanson	Rep.		53rd	1917–1918	Waushara, Adams, Juneau, and Marquette counties
John A. Conant	Rep.		54th	1919–1920	Waushara, Adams, Juneau, and Marquette counties
John A. Conant	Rep.		55th	1921–1922	Waushara, Adams, Juneau, and Marquette counties
Max W. Heck	Rep.		56th	1923–1924	1922–1953 1954–1963; Racine County
Max W. Heck	Rep.		57th	1925–1926	1922–1953 1954–1963; Racine County
Walter S. Goodland	Rep.	Won 1926 election. Re-elected 1930. Elected Lieutenant Governor of Wisconsin in 1934.	58th	1927–1928	1922–1953 1954–1963; Racine County
Walter S. Goodland	Rep.	Won 1926 election. Re-elected 1930. Elected Lieutenant Governor of Wisconsin in 1934.	59th	1929–1930	1922–1953 1954–1963; Racine County
Walter S. Goodland	Rep.	Won 1926 election. Re-elected 1930. Elected Lieutenant Governor of Wisconsin in 1934.	60th	1931–1932	1922–1953 1954–1963; Racine County
Walter S. Goodland	Rep.	Won 1926 election. Re-elected 1930. Elected Lieutenant Governor of Wisconsin in 1934.	61st	1933–1934	1922–1953 1954–1963; Racine County
Joseph Clancy	Dem.		62nd	1935–1936	1922–1953 1954–1963; Racine County
Joseph Clancy	Dem.		63rd	1937–1938	1922–1953 1954–1963; Racine County
Kenneth L. Greenquist	Prog.		64th	1939–1940	1922–1953 1954–1963; Racine County
Kenneth L. Greenquist	Prog.		65th	1941–1942	1922–1953 1954–1963; Racine County
Edward F. Hilker	Rep.		66th	1943–1944	1922–1953 1954–1963; Racine County
Edward F. Hilker	Rep.		67th	1945–1946	1922–1953 1954–1963; Racine County
Edward F. Hilker	Rep.		68th	1947–1948	1922–1953 1954–1963; Racine County
Edward F. Hilker	Rep.		69th	1949–1950	1922–1953 1954–1963; Racine County
Gerald T. Flynn	Dem.		70th	1951–1952	1922–1953 1954–1963; Racine County
Gerald T. Flynn	Dem.		71st	1953–1954	1922–1953 1954–1963; Racine County
Lynn E. Stalbaum	Dem.	Won 1954 election. Re-elected 1958, 1962. Resigned 1964 after election to U.S. House.	72nd	1955–1956	1922–1953 1954–1963; Racine County
Lynn E. Stalbaum	Dem.	Won 1954 election. Re-elected 1958, 1962. Resigned 1964 after election to U.S. House.	73rd	1957–1958	1922–1953 1954–1963; Racine County
Lynn E. Stalbaum	Dem.	Won 1954 election. Re-elected 1958, 1962. Resigned 1964 after election to U.S. House.	74th	1959–1960	1922–1953 1954–1963; Racine County
Lynn E. Stalbaum	Dem.	Won 1954 election. Re-elected 1958, 1962. Resigned 1964 after election to U.S. House.	75th	1961–1962	1922–1953 1954–1963; Racine County
Lynn E. Stalbaum	Dem.	Won 1954 election. Re-elected 1958, 1962. Resigned 1964 after election to U.S. House.	76th	1963–1964	1922–1953 1954–1963; Racine County
Henry Dorman	Dem.	Won 1965 special election. Re-elected 1966, 1970, 1974. Defeated in 1978 primary.	77th	1965–1966	Southeast Racine County: Town of Mount Pleasant; Village of Elmwood Park; Village of North Bay; Village of Sturtevant; Village of Wind Point; City of Racine
Henry Dorman	Dem.	Won 1965 special election. Re-elected 1966, 1970, 1974. Defeated in 1978 primary.	78th	1967–1968	Southeast Racine County: Town of Mount Pleasant; Village of Elmwood Park; Village of North Bay; Village of Sturtevant; Village of Wind Point; City of Racine
Henry Dorman	Dem.	Won 1965 special election. Re-elected 1966, 1970, 1974. Defeated in 1978 primary.	79th	1969–1970	Southeast Racine County: Town of Mount Pleasant; Village of Elmwood Park; Village of North Bay; Village of Sturtevant; Village of Wind Point; City of Racine
Henry Dorman	Dem.	Won 1965 special election. Re-elected 1966, 1970, 1974. Defeated in 1978 primary.	80th	1971–1972	Southeast Racine County: Town of Mount Pleasant; Village of Elmwood Park; Village of North Bay; Village of Sturtevant; Village of Wind Point; City of Racine
Henry Dorman	Dem.	Won 1965 special election. Re-elected 1966, 1970, 1974. Defeated in 1978 primary.	81st	1973–1974	Eastern Racine County: Town of Caledonia; Town of Mount Pleasant; Village of Elmwood Park; Village of North Bay; Village of Sturtevant; Village of Wind Point; City of Racine
Henry Dorman	Dem.	Won 1965 special election. Re-elected 1966, 1970, 1974. Defeated in 1978 primary.	82nd	1975–1976	Eastern Racine County: Town of Caledonia; Town of Mount Pleasant; Village of Elmwood Park; Village of North Bay; Village of Sturtevant; Village of Wind Point; City of Racine
Henry Dorman	Dem.	Won 1965 special election. Re-elected 1966, 1970, 1974. Defeated in 1978 primary.	83rd	1977–1978	Eastern Racine County: Town of Caledonia; Town of Mount Pleasant; Village of Elmwood Park; Village of North Bay; Village of Sturtevant; Village of Wind Point; City of Racine
Joseph A. Strohl	Dem.	Won 1978 election. Re-elected 1982, 1986. Majority Leader 1987–1990. Defeated in 1990 election.	84th	1979–1980	Eastern Racine County: Town of Caledonia; Town of Mount Pleasant; Village of Elmwood Park; Village of North Bay; Village of Sturtevant; Village of Wind Point; City of Racine
Joseph A. Strohl	Dem.	Won 1978 election. Re-elected 1982, 1986. Majority Leader 1987–1990. Defeated in 1990 election.	85th	1981–1982	Eastern Racine County: Town of Caledonia; Town of Mount Pleasant; Village of Elmwood Park; Village of North Bay; Village of Sturtevant; Village of Wind Point; City of Racine
Joseph A. Strohl	Dem.	Won 1978 election. Re-elected 1982, 1986. Majority Leader 1987–1990. Defeated in 1990 election.	86th	1983–1984	Central and Eastern Racine County: Town of Caledonia; Town of Mount Pleasant; Town of Raymond; Town of Yorkville; Village of Elmwood Park; Village of North Bay; Village of Sturtevant; Village of Union Grove; Village of Wind Point; City of Racine
Joseph A. Strohl	Dem.	Won 1978 election. Re-elected 1982, 1986. Majority Leader 1987–1990. Defeated in 1990 election.	87th	1985–1986	Central and Eastern Racine County: Town of Caledonia; Town of Mount Pleasant; Town of Raymond; Town of Yorkville; Village of Elmwood Park; Village of North Bay; Village of Sturtevant; Village of Union Grove; Village of Wind Point; City of Racine
Joseph A. Strohl	Dem.	Won 1978 election. Re-elected 1982, 1986. Majority Leader 1987–1990. Defeated in 1990 election.	88th	1987–1988	Central and Eastern Racine County: Town of Caledonia; Town of Mount Pleasant; Town of Raymond; Town of Yorkville; Village of Elmwood Park; Village of North Bay; Village of Sturtevant; Village of Union Grove; Village of Wind Point; City of Racine
Joseph A. Strohl	Dem.	Won 1978 election. Re-elected 1982, 1986. Majority Leader 1987–1990. Defeated in 1990 election.	89th	1989–1990	Central and Eastern Racine County: Town of Caledonia; Town of Mount Pleasant; Town of Raymond; Town of Yorkville; Village of Elmwood Park; Village of North Bay; Village of Sturtevant; Village of Union Grove; Village of Wind Point; City of Racine
George Petak	Republican	Won 1990 election. Re-elected 1994. Defeated in 1996 recall election.	90th	1991–1992	Central and Eastern Racine County: Town of Caledonia; Town of Mount Pleasant; Town of Raymond; Town of Yorkville; Village of Elmwood Park; Village of North Bay; Village of Sturtevant; Village of Union Grove; Village of Wind Point; City of Racine
George Petak	Republican	Won 1990 election. Re-elected 1994. Defeated in 1996 recall election.	91st	1993–1994	Southern and Eastern Racine County: Town of Caledonia; Town of Dover; Town of Mount Pleasant; Town of Yorkville; Village of Elmwood Park; Village of North Bay; Village of Sturtevant; Village of Union Grove; Village of Wind Point; City of Racine; Wards 1, 6, 7, Town of Burlington; Wards 1, 2, 3, 4, 5, 7, 14, 15, 16, City of Burlington
George Petak	Republican	Won 1990 election. Re-elected 1994. Defeated in 1996 recall election.	92nd	1995–1996	Southern and Eastern Racine County: Town of Caledonia; Town of Dover; Town of Mount Pleasant; Town of Yorkville; Village of Elmwood Park; Village of North Bay; Village of Sturtevant; Village of Union Grove; Village of Wind Point; City of Racine; Wards 1, 6, 7, Town of Burlington; Wards 1, 2, 3, 4, 5, 7, 14, 15, 16, City of Burlington
Kimberly Plache	Dem.	Won 1996 recall election. Re-elected 1998. Defeated in 2002 election.	92nd	1995–1996	Southern and Eastern Racine County: Town of Caledonia; Town of Dover; Town of Mount Pleasant; Town of Yorkville; Village of Elmwood Park; Village of North Bay; Village of Sturtevant; Village of Union Grove; Village of Wind Point; City of Racine; Wards 1, 6, 7, Town of Burlington; Wards 1, 2, 3, 4, 5, 7, 14, 15, 16, City of Burlington
Kimberly Plache	Dem.	Won 1996 recall election. Re-elected 1998. Defeated in 2002 election.	93rd	1997–1998	Southern and Eastern Racine County: Town of Caledonia; Town of Dover; Town of Mount Pleasant; Town of Yorkville; Village of Elmwood Park; Village of North Bay; Village of Sturtevant; Village of Union Grove; Village of Wind Point; City of Racine; Wards 1, 6, 7, Town of Burlington; Wards 1, 2, 3, 4, 5, 7, 14, 15, 16, City of Burlington
Kimberly Plache	Dem.	Won 1996 recall election. Re-elected 1998. Defeated in 2002 election.	94th	1999–2000	Southern and Eastern Racine County: Town of Caledonia; Town of Dover; Town of Mount Pleasant; Town of Yorkville; Village of Elmwood Park; Village of North Bay; Village of Sturtevant; Village of Union Grove; Village of Wind Point; City of Racine; Wards 1, 6, 7, Town of Burlington; Wards 1, 2, 3, 4, 5, 7, 14, 15, 16, City of Burlington
Kimberly Plache	Dem.	Won 1996 recall election. Re-elected 1998. Defeated in 2002 election.	95th	2001–2002	Southern and Eastern Racine County: Town of Caledonia; Town of Dover; Town of Mount Pleasant; Town of Yorkville; Village of Elmwood Park; Village of North Bay; Village of Sturtevant; Village of Union Grove; Village of Wind Point; City of Racine; Wards 1, 6, 7, Town of Burlington; Wards 1, 2, 3, 4, 5, 7, 14, 15, 16, City of Burlington
Cathy Stepp	Rep.	Won 2002 election. Did not seek re-election.	96th	2003–2004	Central and Eastern Racine County: Town of Caledonia; Town of Dover; Town of Norway; Town of Raymond; Town of Rochester; Town of Yorkville; Village of Elmwood Park; Village of Mount Pleasant; Village of North Bay; Village of Sturtevant; Village of Union Grove; Village of Wind Point; City of Racine
Cathy Stepp	Rep.	Won 2002 election. Did not seek re-election.	97th	2005–2006	Central and Eastern Racine County: Town of Caledonia; Town of Dover; Town of Norway; Town of Raymond; Town of Rochester; Town of Yorkville; Village of Elmwood Park; Village of Mount Pleasant; Village of North Bay; Village of Sturtevant; Village of Union Grove; Village of Wind Point; City of Racine
John Lehman	Dem.	Won 2006 election. Defeated in 2010 election.	98th	2007–2008	Central and Eastern Racine County: Town of Dover; Town of Norway; Town of Raymond; Town of Yorkville; Village of Caledonia; Village of Elmwood Park; Village of Mount Pleasant; Village of North Bay; Village of Rochester; Village of Sturtevant; Village of Union Grove; Village of Wind Point; City of Racine
John Lehman	Dem.	Won 2006 election. Defeated in 2010 election.	99th	2009–2010	Central and Eastern Racine County: Town of Dover; Town of Norway; Town of Raymond; Town of Yorkville; Village of Caledonia; Village of Elmwood Park; Village of Mount Pleasant; Village of North Bay; Village of Rochester; Village of Sturtevant; Village of Union Grove; Village of Wind Point; City of Racine
Van H. Wanggaard	Rep.	Won 2010 election. Defeated in 2012 recall election.	100th	2011–2012	Central and Eastern Racine County: Town of Dover; Town of Norway; Town of Raymond; Town of Yorkville; Village of Caledonia; Village of Elmwood Park; Village of Mount Pleasant; Village of North Bay; Village of Rochester; Village of Sturtevant; Village of Union Grove; Village of Wind Point; City of Racine
John Lehman	Dem.	Won 2012 recall election. Did not seek re-election.	100th	2011–2012	Central and Eastern Racine County: Town of Dover; Town of Norway; Town of Raymond; Town of Yorkville; Village of Caledonia; Village of Elmwood Park; Village of Mount Pleasant; Village of North Bay; Village of Rochester; Village of Sturtevant; Village of Union Grove; Village of Wind Point; City of Racine
John Lehman	Dem.	Won 2012 recall election. Did not seek re-election.	101st	2013–2014	Central and Western Racine County: Town of Dover; Town of Norway; Town of Raymond; Town of Yorkville; Village of Caledonia; Village of North Bay; Village of Rochester; Village of Sturtevant; Village of Union Grove; Village of Wind Point; City of Burlington; Wards 1-7, 11, Town of Burlington; Wards 1-20, Village of Mount Pleasant; Wards 13, 16, 20, 27, 28, 34-36, City of Racine; Central and Western Kenosha County: Town of Brighton; Town of Bristol; Town of Paris; Town of Pleasant Prairie; Town of Randall; Town of Salem; Village of Bristol; Village of Paddock Lake; Village of Silver Lake; Village of Twin Lakes; Wards 1-4, 11, Town of Somers; Wards 88-91, City of Kenosha; part of Walworth County: Ward 9, City of Burlington
Van H. Wanggaard	Rep.	Won 2014 election. Re-elected 2018, 2022.	102nd	2015–2016	
Van H. Wanggaard	Rep.	Won 2014 election. Re-elected 2018, 2022.	103rd	2017–2018	Central and Western Racine County: Town of Dover; Town of Norway; Town of Raymond; Town of Yorkville; Village of Caledonia; Village of North Bay; Village of Rochester; Village of Sturtevant; Village of Union Grove; Village of Wind Point; City of Burlington; Wards 1-7, 11, Town of Burlington; Wards 1-20, Village of Mount Pleasant; Wards 13, 16, 20, 27, 28, 34-36, City of Racine; Central and Western Kenosha County: Town of Brighton; Town of Bristol; Town of Paris; Town of Pleasant Prairie; Town of Randall; Village of Bristol; Village of Paddock Lake; Village of Salem Lakes; Village of Twin Lakes; Ward 1, Town of Somers; Wards 1-4, 11, Village of Somers; Wards 88-91, City of Kenosha; part of Walworth County: Ward 9, City of Burlington
Van H. Wanggaard	Rep.	Won 2014 election. Re-elected 2018, 2022.	104th	2019–2020	
Van H. Wanggaard	Rep.	Won 2014 election. Re-elected 2018, 2022.	105th	2021–2022	
Van H. Wanggaard	Rep.	Won 2014 election. Re-elected 2018, 2022.	106th	2023–2024	Most of Kenosha County, most of Racine County, part of Walworth County
Van H. Wanggaard	Rep.	Won 2014 election. Re-elected 2018, 2022.	107th	2025–2026	Northeast Racine County southwest Milwaukee County
