= Joseph H. Woodnorth =

19th century American politician

Joseph Woodnorth
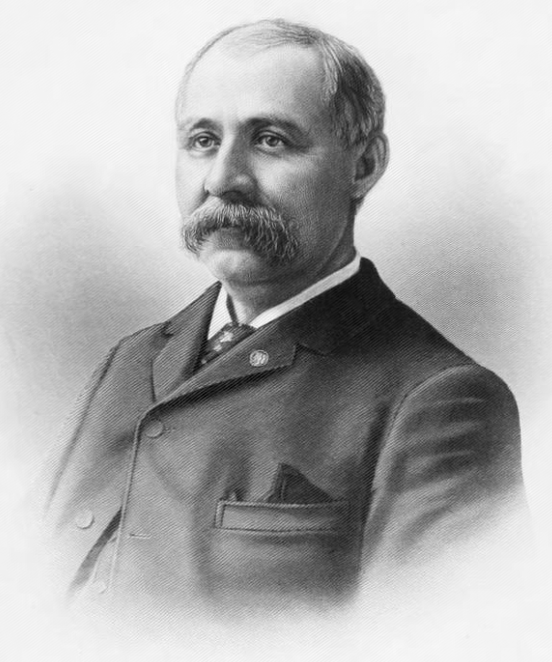

Member of the Wisconsin Senate from the 21st district
- In office January 5, 1891 – September 1894
- Preceded by: John E. Leahy
- Succeeded by: John Phillips

Register of Deeds of Waupaca County, Wisconsin
- In office January 5, 1880 – January 5, 1885
- Preceded by: Ole O. Hole
- Succeeded by: Henry Geibel

Personal details
- Born: December 17, 1845 New York, New York, U.S.
- Died: September 1, 1910 (aged 64) King, Wisconsin, U.S.
- Resting place: Lakeside Memorial Park, Waupaca, Wisconsin
- Party: Democratic
- Spouse: Irene E. Vaughan (m. 1871–1910)
- Children: Blanche
- Occupation: Merchant
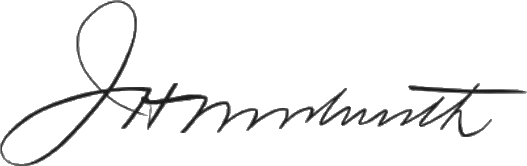
- Signature

Military service
- Allegiance: United States
- Branch/service: United States Volunteers; Union Army
- Years of service: 1863–1865
- Rank: 1st Lieutenant, USV; Brevet Captain, USV
- Unit: 21st Reg. Wis. Vol. Infantry; 3rd Reg. Wis. Vol. Infantry
- Battles/wars: American Civil War: Atlanta campaign; Battle of Rocky Face Ridge; Battle of Resaca; Battle of Kennesaw Mountain; Battle of Peachtree Creek; Battle of Atlanta; Franklin–Nashville Campaign; Battle of Franklin; Battle of Nashville

Joseph Henry Woodnorth (December 17, 1845 – September 1, 1910) was an American merchant and Democratic politician. He was a member of the Wisconsin State Senate, representing Shawano, Waupaca, and eastern Marathon counties during the 1891 and 1893 sessions. He also served in the Union Army during the American Civil War and received an honorary brevet to captain.

== Biography ==
Woodnorth was born on December 17, 1845, in New York City, the son of recent English American immigrants. He moved with his family to Waupaca County, Wisconsin, in 1856, where his father purchased a farm. Woodnorth was educated and worked on his father's farm until age 18, when he enlisted for service in the American Civil War.

== Civil War ==
Woodnorth entered service in the Union Army in December 1863, just days after his 18th birthday. He was enrolled as a private in Company G of the 21st Wisconsin Infantry Regiment and served with the regiment through the Atlanta campaign.

On June 28, 1864, he was detailed to the personal staff of Major General George Henry Thomas, as an orderly. That September, he was commissioned as a first lieutenant and assigned chief clerk to the brigade inspector general, working still on behalf of General Thomas. He was ultimately granted a brevet to captain due to actions he took during the Battle of Franklin. On that occasion, General Thomas wrote a letter of praise to his aide.

Headquarters of the Army of the Cumberland. My Dear Sir:— I have the honor to congratulate you for the heroism and bravery you have this day shown, which I assure you, is fully recognized. We have gained a great victory and you must share the honor.

— On field of battle, Franklin, Tenn. Geo. H. Thomas. Major-General Commanding. To Joseph H. Woodnorth.

As the 21st Wisconsin Infantry was mustered out of federal service and ceased to exist in June 1865, Woodnorth briefly transferred to the 3rd Wisconsin Infantry Regiment, and remained in the service until September 1865.

== Merchant and political career ==
After the war, he returned to Waupaca and worked on his father's farm. In 1867 he was elected city marshal and served for three years. In 1871, he was hired by Henry Mumbrue to manage the Gill's Landing Warehouse on the Wolf River. A year later, he opened a drug store with Mumbrue as a partner, and in 1877 assumed full ownership of the store.

Over the next decade, Woodnorth held a number of public service roles, including city fire chief, city superintendent of schools (1878–1886), member of the Waupaca County board (1882–1883), and register of deeds (1880–1885). In 1888 he was appointed Register of the United States General Land Office at Menasha by President Grover Cleveland.

Woodnorth assisted in the founding of the Wisconsin Veterans Home in King, Wisconsin and served on its board of trustees until his death. He also served as president of the Waupaca Starch and Potato Company, director of the National Bank of Waupaca, and vice president of the State Park Association of Milwaukee.

Running on the Democratic Party ticket, Woodnorth made his first run for Wisconsin State Senate in 1886, but was soundly defeated by Republican John E. Leahy. Four years later, Woodnorth ran again and won the seat in the Democratic wave election of 1890. He represented Wisconsin's 21st State Senate district, which then comprised all of Shawano and Waupaca counties, as well as the eastern half of Marathon County. After the close of the 1893 legislative session he resigned from office to accept an appointment from President Cleveland to serve as U.S. pension agent for the Milwaukee district.

He died in 1910 at his home in Waupaca, Wisconsin, after a short time with pneumonia.

== Personal life ==
Joseph H. Woodnorth was the eldest nine children born to Paul Woodnorth and his wife Sarah. Paul and Sarah emigrated to the United States from England in 1842 and settled in New York City. Paul Woodnorth was a tailor by trade and operated a tailor shop on Park Row in New York City. He went west in 1849 to try his luck in the California Gold Rush but returned without much success. Sarah Woodnorth was also active in business and operated a crockery shop in the city. When they earned enough money, they purchased a farm in the town of Royalton, Wisconsin, in 1856. They resided on that farm for three years before selling it and purchasing a farm in the town of Waupaca. After selling his farm in Waupaca, Paul Woodnorth purchased land in Portage County, but never lived on that land, residing instead in the city of Waupaca until his death.

Joseph H. Woodnorth married Irene E. Vaughan, of Erie County, New York, on December 26, 1871, they had one child.

Joseph Woodnorth was active with the Grand Army of the Republic fraternal organization for Civil War veterans, and helped found the lodge in Waupaca. He was also active with the Knights of Pythias.

== Electoral history ==
=== Wisconsin Senate (1886, 1890) ===
Wisconsin Senate, 21st District Election, 1886
Party	Candidate	Votes	%	±%
General Election, November 2, 1886
Republican	John E. Leahy	6,766	56.32%	+10.33%
Democratic	Joseph H. Woodnorth	5,248	43.68%	−6.50%
Plurality		1,518	12.64%	+8.44%
Total votes		12,014	100.0%	+34.35%
Republican gain from Democratic				

Wisconsin Senate, 21st District Election, 1890
Party	Candidate	Votes	%	±%
General Election, November 4, 1890
Democratic	Joseph H. Woodnorth	5,445	54.80%	+11.11%
Republican	William H. Hatton	4,492	45.20%	
Plurality		953	9.59%	-3.04%
Total votes		9,937	100.0%	-17.29%
Democratic gain from Republican				

Wisconsin Senate
Preceded by John E. Leahy	Member of the Wisconsin Senate from the 21st district January 5, 1891 – September 1894	Succeeded by John Phillips
Political offices
Preceded by Ole O. Hole	Register of Deeds of Waupaca County, Wisconsin; January 5, 1880 – January 5, 1885	Succeeded by Henry Geibel
