= John A. Conant =

American politician

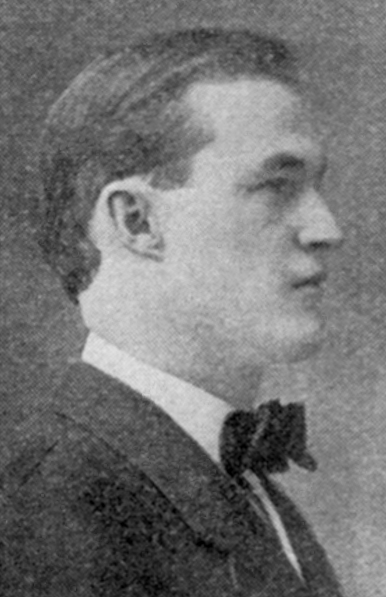

Member of the Wisconsin Senate from the 21st district
- In office January 6, 1919 – January 1, 1923
- Preceded by: Frank H. Hanson
- Succeeded by: Max W. Heck

District Attorney of Marquette County, Wisconsin
- In office January 1, 1915 – January 1, 1919
- Preceded by: John A. Metzler
- Succeeded by: John A. Metzler

Personal details
- Born: August 7, 1887 Weyauwega, Wisconsin, U.S.
- Died: December 3, 1964 (aged 77) Marquette County, Wisconsin, U.S.
- Resting place: Westfield East Cemetery, Westfield, Wisconsin
- Party: Republican
- Spouse: Hazel Lee Moss (m. 1916–1964)
- Children: Jack Morrell Conant; (b. 1923; died 1999); Carol Monk née Conant (b. Dec 1917; died May 2016)
- Education: University of Minnesota
- Profession: Lawyer

John A. Conant (August 7, 1887 – December 3, 1964) was an American lawyer and Republican politician from Marquette County, Wisconsin. He was a member of the Wisconsin Senate, representing Wisconsin's 21st Senate district during the 1919 and 1921 sessions. He also served as district attorney of Marquette County.

== Biography ==
Conant was born on August 7, 1887. He graduated from high school in Eagle River, Wisconsin, and from the University of Minnesota.

== Career ==
Conant was elected to the Senate in 1918. He had been District Attorney of Marquette County, Wisconsin, since 1915. Conant resigned from that position in 1919 to take his Senate seat. He was a Republican.

Wisconsin Senate
Preceded by Frank H. Hanson	Member of the Wisconsin Senate from the 21st district January 6, 1919 – January 1, 1923	Succeeded by Max W. Heck
Legal offices
Preceded by John A. Metzler	District Attorney of Marquette County, Wisconsin; January 1, 1915 – January 1, 1919	Succeeded by John A. Metzler
