= Edward F. Kileen =

American politician

Edward Kileen

Member of the Wisconsin Senate
- In office January 1913 – January 1915
- Preceded by: Edward E. Browne
- Succeeded by: Frank H. Hanson
- Constituency: 21st Senate district
- In office January 1911 – January 1913
- Preceded by: Theodore W. Brazeau
- Succeeded by: David V. Jennings
- Constituency: 9th Senate district

Village President of Wautoma, Wisconsin
- In office April 1904 – April 1912

District Attorney of Waushara County, Wisconsin
- In office January 1, 1901 – January 1, 1911
- Preceded by: Walter D. Corrigan Sr.
- Succeeded by: Gad Jones
- In office January 1, 1895 – January 1, 1899
- Preceded by: Levi Soule
- Succeeded by: Walter D. Corrigan Sr.

Personal details
- Born: January 12, 1869 Aurora, Waushara County, Wisconsin, U.S.
- Died: April 14, 1944 (aged 75) Wautoma, Wisconsin, U.S.
- Resting place: Oakwood Cemetery; Berlin, Wisconsin
- Party: Republican
- Spouse: Anna Guinan
- Children: 4
- Education: University of Wisconsin

Edward F. Kileen (January 12, 1869 – April 14, 1944) was an American lawyer, teacher, and Republican politician from Waushara County, Wisconsin. He was a member of the Wisconsin Senate from 1911 to 1915. Earlier, he served 14 years as district attorney of Waushara County and was village president of Wautoma, Wisconsin.

== Biography ==
Kileen was born on January 12, 1869, in Aurora, Waushara County, Wisconsin, to Michael Kileen and Hannah Navin. He grew up in Aurora and went to High School In Berlin, Wisconsin. He graduated in 1890. He then became a teacher and taught for a few years. He went off to attend Law school at the University of Wisconsin of which he graduated in 1894.

In 1899 he married Anna Guinan with whom he had four children.

He further established himself in the city by building a grand home across from the County Jail in 1908. By 1910 he ran for Senator and served two terms in the Wisconsin Senate. He was accredited with the establishment of the trout hatchery in Wild Rose, the Waushara County Normal School and many of the Waushara County Highways. He was a member of the Berlin chapter of the Knights of Columbus, Society of the Holy Name, and Wautoma Lions Club.

He died April 14, 1944, and is buried at Oakwood Cemetery in Berlin, Wisconsin.

== Political career ==
The year he graduated from law school, Kileen made his first run for district attorney of Waushara County, Wisconsin, and won the office. He served two consecutive terms, then returned to office after the 1900 election and served five more terms. While serving as district attorney, he was also elected village president of Wautoma, Wisconsin, and served 8 years in that office. In 1910, rather than running for another term as district attorney, he ran for Wisconsin Senate in what was then Wisconsin's 9th Senate district. He won that seat and served in the Senate from 1911 to 1915. He was a Republican.

== Electoral history ==
Wisconsin 9th District Senate Election 1910
Party	Candidate	Votes	%	±%
Republican	Edward F. Kileen	5,333	60.17%	
Democratic	Thomas Patterson	2,861	32.28%	
Social Democratic	C.A. Boorman	669	7.55%	
Total votes		'8,863'	'100.0%'	
Republican hold				
