= William H. Hatten =

American politician (1856-1937)

Member of the Wisconsin Senate from the 21st district
- In office January 2, 1899 – January 7, 1907
- Preceded by: John Phillips
- Succeeded by: Edward E. Browne

Personal details
- Born: August 24, 1856 New Lisbon, New York, U.S.
- Died: March 30, 1937 (aged 80) New London, Wisconsin, U.S.
- Resting place: Floral Hill Cemetery, New London, Wisconsin
- Party: Republican
- Spouse: none
- Children: none
- Occupation: Lumberman, politician

William Henry Hatten (August 24, 1856 – March 30, 1937) was an American businessman and Republican politician from Outagamie County, Wisconsin. He served eight years as a member of the Wisconsin Senate, representing Wisconsin's 21st Senate district from 1899 to 1907. He came close to being elected United States senator in the 1907 special election, but was outmaneuvered in the Republican caucus by Isaac Stephenson. Later in life he was president of the board of trustees of Lawrence University.

In historical documents his last name is sometimes spelled "Hatton". As a young man, he sometimes was known as William Wooden, using the last name of his adopted parents. Hatten accumulated a fortune worth about $132 million adjusted for inflation to 2025; he was never married, had no known offspring, and left no will, so his estate was heavily contested by his biological and adopted siblings.

== Early life and career ==
William H. Hatten was born in New Lisbon, New York, in 1856. As a child, he moved with his parents to settle a farm near Fond du Lac, Wisconsin. Hatten had a difficult childhood; his mother died in 1867, and shortly after that his father had to begin sending the boy out to work on neighboring farms to earn an income. In 1869, Hatten's father ultimately left him in the care of David and Harriet Woodin, who legally adopted him as their son in 1877.

The Woodins sent him to school in Oshkosh, Wisconsin, where he attended high school. In 1878, he was employed as a clerk at a store in Manawa, Wisconsin. A short time later, the J. M. Rounds Lumber Co. at Manawa went into receivership, and the receiver, James Meiklejohn, hired Hatten to manage the sawmill. Through diligent work, Hatten gradually became a co-owner of the company with Meiklejohn, before becoming sole owner. He made a pivotal decision in the midst of the Panic of 1893 to invest and harvest new timber lands, piling up a large stock of lumber that he was able to sell at a massive profit when the market rebounded. In 1895, he moved the company to New London, Wisconsin, and renamed it the Hatton Lumber Co. New London would be his primary residence for the rest of his life, most of that time he resided at the Elwood Hotel.

== Political career ==
Through his success in business, Hatten became involved in state politics with the Republican Party. He made his first run for elected office in 1890, running for Wisconsin Senate in the 21st Senate district. The early 1890s were a historically bad time for Republicans in Wisconsin, and Hatten lost the election to Democrat Joseph H. Woodnorth. In 1892, the Republican state convention selected Hatten for their slate of presidential electors, but the Democratic candidate, Grover Cleveland, won the state of Wisconsin that year.

In 1897, Hatten became a trustee of Lawrence University. In 1898, Hatten decided to make another bid for public office, seeking again the Republican nomination for state Senate in the 21st district. That fall, he was nominated by the district convention and easily won the general election, taking 65% of the vote. He was re-elected by a similar margin in 1902.

In 1906, Hatten was rumored as a candidate for governor of Wisconsin, but deferred after a negotiation with supporters of Robert M. La Follette and Irvine Lenroot, believing that he had secured their support for his election as U.S. senator when John Coit Spooner's term expired in 1909. Hatten then personally conferred with La Follette at Chicago that summer, where La Follette was said to have suggested Hatten run for lieutenant governor of Wisconsin. Hatten did not make a run for lieutenant governor, and ultimately chose not to run for re-election to the state Senate either. Hatten instead supported his business partner W. H. Dick in an unsuccessful bid for chairman of the Republican Party of Wisconsin.

In March 1907, incumbent U.S. senator John Coit Spooner announced he would resign with two years left of his term. Within days, Hatten declared that he would campaign for election to succeed Spooner as U.S. senator, and was one of five Republican candidates who entered the Republican caucus with significant support. The Senate election dragged out for a month in the 48th Wisconsin Legislature, with the Republican factions unable to coalesce behind a single nominee. Hatten's support gradually grew, until on May 16, he came within 2 votes of winning the nomination. In caucus that evening, however, Hatten's support collapsed after a break orchestrated by lieutenant governor William D. Connor. Instead Isaac Stephenson received the nomination and was elected U.S. senator.

Shortly after the election, Hatten announced he would be a candidate in the Republican primary for the same U.S. Senate seat in 1908. Stephenson also sought renomination, and a number of other Republicans sought the office. Stephenson was ultimately renominated, with Hatten coming in third.

== Later years ==
In the midst of his political efforts, Hatten also expanded his business interests into banking in Oshkosh. He died of pneumonia at New London Community Hospital on March 30, 1937, after a long period of illness.

== Electoral history ==
=== Wisconsin Senate (1890) ===
Year	Election	Date	Elected				Defeated				Total	Plurality
1890	General	Nov. 4	Joseph H. Woodnorth	Democratic	5,445	54.80%	William H. Hatten	Rep.	4,492	45.20%	9,937	953

=== Wisconsin Senate (1898, 1902) ===
Year	Election	Date	Elected				Defeated				Total	Plurality
1898	General	Nov. 8	William H. Hatten	Republican	5,958	65.13%	Carl Von Neupert	Dem.	2,934	32.07%	9,148	3,024
1898	General	Nov. 8	William H. Hatten	Republican	5,958	65.13%	Ernest C. Williams	Proh.	256	2.80%	9,148	3,024
1902	General	Nov. 4	William H. Hatten (inc)	Republican	6,170	63.71%	Charles E. Crane	Dem.	3,258	33.64%	9,685	2,912

Wisconsin Senate
Preceded by John Phillips	Member of the Wisconsin Senate from the 21st district January 2, 1899 – January 7, 1907	Succeeded by Edward E. Browne
