= Kalinke =

Kalinke may refer to:

== Places ==
- Kalinke, Wisconsin, unincorporated community in Easton, Marathon County, Wisconsin, United States

== People with the surname ==
- Ernst W. Kalinke (1918–1992), German cinematographer
- Margot Kalinke (1909–1981), German politician
- Marianne E. Kalinke (1939- ), Old Norse-Icelandic studies scholar
- Mario Kalinke (born 1974), German weightlifter
- Peter Kalinke (born 1936), East German footballer
