= 1916 Wisconsin Supreme Court election =

- April 4, 1916

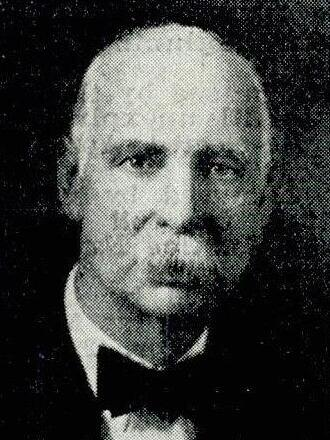
Candidate	Franz C. Eschweiler	William J. Turner	Ellsworth B. Belden ⋅
Popular vote	70,380	64,568	57,670
Percentage	23.40%	21.46%	19.17%
Candidate	Walter D. Corrigan ⋅	Chester A. Fowler
Popular vote	56,666	51,033
Percentage	18.84%	16.97%
Justice before election
William H. Timlin
Elected Justice
Franz C. Eschweiler

The 1916 Wisconsin Supreme Court election was held on Tuesday, April 4, 1916, to elect a justice to the Wisconsin Supreme Court for a ten-year term. Circuit court judge Franz C. Eschweiler prevailed in a five-candidate race, winning a plurality of the vote.

Incumbent first-term justice William H. Timlin did not seek re-election, and would ultimately die soon after the election (shortly before his term would have expired).

1916 Wisconsin Supreme Court election
Party	Candidate	Votes	%
General Election, April 1916
Nonpartisan	Franz C. Eschweiler	70,380	23.40
Nonpartisan	William J. Turner	64,568	21.46
Nonpartisan	Ellsworth B. Belden	57,670	19.17
Nonpartisan	Walter D. Corrigan	56,666	18.84
Nonpartisan	Chester A. Fowler	51,033	16.97
	Scattering	489	0.16
Total votes		300,806	100
