= Franz Eschweiler =

Franz Eschweiler may refer to:

- Franz C. Eschweiler (1863–1929), American lawyer and judge
- Franz Gerhard Eschweiler (1796–1831), German botanist
