= 1926 Wisconsin Supreme Court election =

- April 6, 1926
Candidate	Franz C. Eschweiler
Popular vote	293,857
Percentage	100%
Justice before election
Franz C. Eschweiler
Elected Justice
Franz C. Eschweiler

The 1926 Wisconsin Supreme Court election was held on Tuesday, April 6, 1926, to elect a justice to the Wisconsin Supreme Court for a ten-year term. Incumbent justice Franz C. Eschweiler was re-elected to a second term without opposition.

1926 Wisconsin Supreme Court election
Party	Candidate	Votes	%
General election (April 6, 1926)
Nonpartisan	Franz C. Eschweiler (incumbent)	293,857	100
Total votes		293,857	100
