= Ellsworth B. Belden =

American lawyer and judge (1866–1939)

The Honorable Ellsworth B. Belden
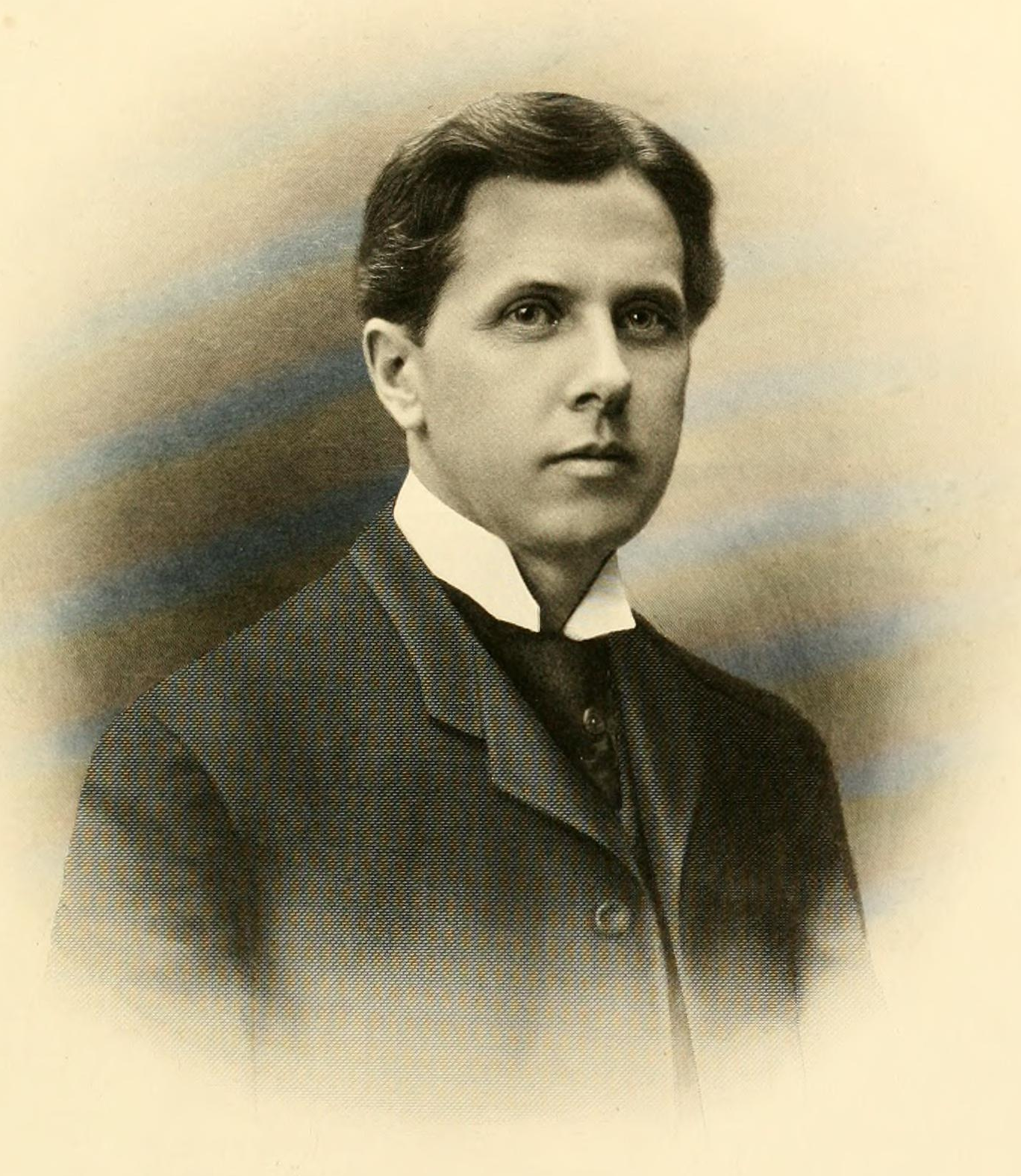

Wisconsin Circuit Court Judge for the 1st circuit
- In office January 6, 1902 – March 11, 1939
- Preceded by: Frank M. Fish
- Succeeded by: Alfred L. Drury

County Judge of Racine County, Wisconsin
- In office September 5, 1889 – January 6, 1902
- Appointed by: William D. Hoard
- Preceded by: Philo Belden
- Succeeded by: Max W. Heck

Personal details
- Born: Ellsworth Burnett Belden; May 18, 1866 Rochester, Wisconsin, U.S.
- Died: March 11, 1939 (aged 72) St. Mary's Hospital, Racine, Wisconsin
- Resting place: Mound Cemetery, Racine, Wisconsin
- Party: Republican
- Spouse: Hattie Marie Raymond (m. 1890; died 1946)
- Children: 2
- Relatives: Philo Belden (grandfather)
- Profession: Lawyer, Judge

Ellsworth Burnett Belden (May 18, 1866 – March 11, 1939) was an American lawyer and judge from Racine County, Wisconsin. He served nearly 50 years as a judge in Racine County, serving 12 years as county judge (1889–1902), then serving 37 years as Wisconsin circuit court judge for the 1st circuit—then-comprising Racine, Kenosha, and Walworth counties—from 1902 until his death in 1939.

His paternal grandfather, Philo Belden, was one of the earliest settlers of Rochester, Wisconsin, and a prominent politician and judge in early Racine County.

== Biography ==
Born in Rochester, Wisconsin, Belden was educated in the common schools of the district and graduated from the Rochester Seminary in 1883. He was employed by his grandfather, Judge Philo Belden, in the County Court of Racine County until the fall of 1884, when he entered the University of Wisconsin Law School in Madison, Wisconsin. At the time of his graduation, in 1886, he was the youngest person to have ever received a diploma from the school. At age 20, however, he was still technically too young to practice law in the state of Wisconsin, thus worked for a time as an assistant to the Attorney General of Wisconsin, Leander F. Frisby.

When eligible, he was admitted to the State Bar of Wisconsin and began practicing law in Racine County. But in April 1889, he ran for County Judge to replace his grandfather, who was retiring. After the younger Belden won the election, Judge Philo Belden opted to resign his office early due to his deteriorating health. The Governor appointed the younger Belden to begin his term early and he was sworn into office on September 5, 1889. At the time of his election, at age 23, he was the youngest County Judge in the history of the state.

Belden, circa 1916

After two six-year terms serving as County Judge, in 1901, Judge Belden ran for the Wisconsin Circuit Court seat in the 1st circuit and was elected in the spring election. At the time, the 1st circuit was composed of Racine, Kenosha and Walworth counties. Judge Belden was re-elected in this office six times, serving over 37 years. Belden was an unsuccessful candidate in the 1916 Wisconsin Supreme Court election.

On February 12, 1939, he was admitted to St. Mary's Hospital in Racine, suffering from heart disease and died a month later.

== Personal life and family ==
Belden was a grandson of Philo Belden, who was one of the founders of the town of Rochester, Wisconsin, and served in many state and local offices in the early years of Wisconsin's statehood. His father, Henry Ward Belden, served as an officer in the 24th Wisconsin Volunteer Infantry Regiment in the American Civil War.

Belden married Hattie Marie Raymond on June 26, 1890. They had two sons.

Judge Belden was a member of the Episcopal Church, the Knights of Pythias, Rotary International, Kiwanis Club, Optimist International, Royal Arcanum, and Modern Woodmen of America, and was a 32nd Degree Mason. For several years, he was president of the Racine YMCA, and was credited for the fundraising effort that built the YMCA building in Racine (part of Racine's Old Main Street Historic District in the National Register of Historic Places).

During World War I, Judge Belden was an active and effective campaigner for Liberty Loans, and his son, Stanley, served as an officer in the U.S. Army.

== Electoral history ==
=== Racine County Judge (1889, 1895) ===
Racine County Judge Election, 1889
Party	Candidate	Votes	%	±%
General Election, April 2, 1889
Nonpartisan	Ellsworth B. Belden	3,076	56.63%	
Nonpartisan	Ernst Merton	2,356	43.37%	
Plurality		720	13.25%	
Total votes		5,432	100.0%	

=== Wisconsin Circuit Court (1901–1937) ===
Wisconsin Circuit Court, 1st Circuit Election, 1901
Party	Candidate	Votes	%	±%
General Election, April 2, 1901
Nonpartisan	Ellsworth B. Belden	7,764	62.40%	
Nonpartisan	John B. Simmons	4,679	37.60%	
Plurality		3,085	24.79%	
Total votes		12,443	100.0%	

=== Wisconsin Supreme Court (1916) ===
1916 Wisconsin Supreme Court election
Party	Candidate	Votes	%	±%
General Election, April 1916
Nonpartisan	Franz C. Eschweiler	70,380	23.40	
Nonpartisan	William J. Turner	64,568	21.46	
Nonpartisan	Ellsworth B. Belden	57,670	19.17	
Nonpartisan	Walter D. Corrigan	56,666	18.84	
Nonpartisan	Chester A. Fowler	51,033	16.97	
	Scattering	489	0.16	
Plurality		5,812	1.93	
Total votes		300,806	100	

Legal offices
Preceded by Philo Belden	County Judge of Racine County, Wisconsin; September 5, 1889 – January 6, 1902	Succeeded by Max W. Heck
Preceded by John B. Winslow	Wisconsin Circuit Court Judge for the 1st circuit January 6, 1902 – March 11, 1939	Succeeded by Alfred L. Drury
