= Max W. Heck =

Early 20th century American lawyer and judge

The Honorable Max W. Heck
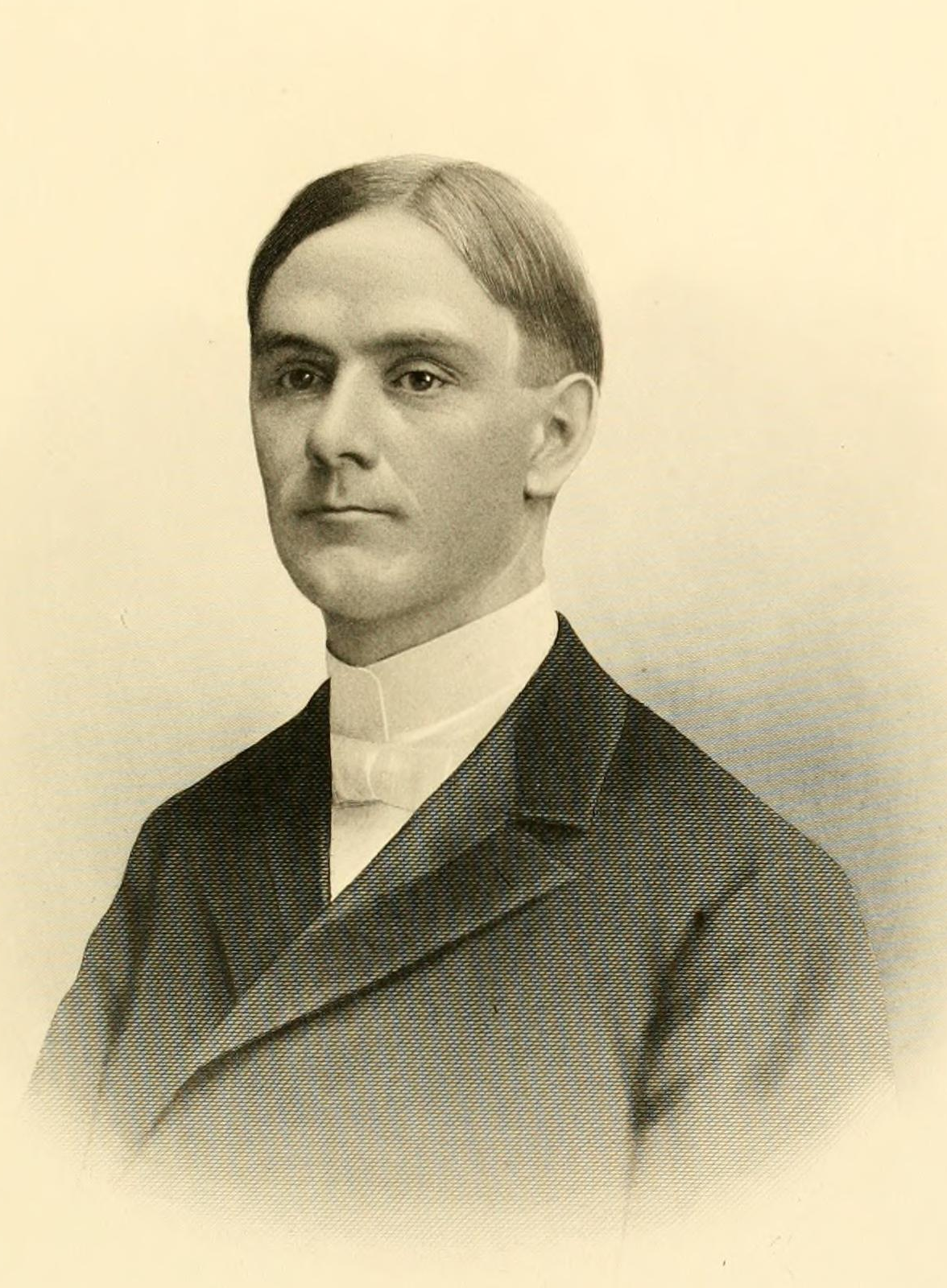

Member of the Wisconsin Senate from the 21st district
- In office January 1, 1923 – January 3, 1927
- Preceded by: John A. Conant
- Succeeded by: Walter Samuel Goodland

County Judge of Racine County, Wisconsin
- In office January 6, 1902 – January 5, 1914
- Preceded by: Ellsworth Burnett Belden
- Succeeded by: Walter C. Palmer

Personal details
- Born: June 9, 1869 Chicago, Illinois, US
- Died: October 18, 1938 (aged 69) Racine, Wisconsin, US
- Cause of death: Accidental fall
- Resting place: Mound Cemetery; Racine, Wisconsin
- Party: Progressive (after 1924); Republican (before 1924); Democratic (before 1905)
- Spouse: Luella Margaret Pritchard (m. 1896; died 1946)
- Children: 1
- Profession: Lawyer, Judge

Military service
- Allegiance: United States
- Branch/service: United States Army
- Years of service: 1898
- Rank: Private
- Unit: 1st Reg. Wis. Vol. Infantry
- Battles/wars: Spanish–American War

Max W. Heck (June 9, 1869 – October 18, 1938) was an American politician and jurist from Wisconsin, who served as a County Judge and Progressive Republican Wisconsin State Senator.

== Biography ==
Max Heck was born in Chicago, Illinois, one of seven children born to Jacob and Victoria (Schlund) Heck. His parents were both German American immigrants, but were well established in the United States by the time of his birth. When Max was six months old, his family moved back to Racine, Wisconsin—where they had previously resided before his birth. He was raised and educated there, attending public schools. After his primary education, he attended Howlands Academy and studied law in the office of Hand & Flett while working as a paperboy and then letter carrier. Finally he attended the University of Wisconsin Law School, graduated in 1892, and was admitted to the State Bar of Wisconsin in June of that year.

He practiced law in Racine, and became involved with the Democratic Party. In 1893, under the presidency of Grover Cleveland, Heck was appointed stamp collector of internal revenue for Racine, an office he retained until resigning in July 1897 at the arrival of his successor. In 1894 he sought the Democratic nomination for district attorney, making a strong showing in the first round of balloting, but ultimately did not get the nomination. Nevertheless, he remained active and influential in the party and became chairman of the party in the city of Racine.

As he rose in local political prominence, he also rose in prominence in his legal career, forming a law partnership known as Richie & Heck. In 1894, he earned local notoriety when he successfully won the acquittal of Mary Mayer, who had been charged with poisoning her husband, Herman Groenke.

=== War and City Attorney ===
At the outbreak of the Spanish–American War, in 1898, he enlisted in the United States Army and was enrolled as a private in Company F, 1st Wisconsin Volunteer Infantry Regiment. He left the state with the regiment in late April, but a week after his departure, the Racine City Council voted to name him City Attorney. Heck's volunteer regiment was billeted to Camp Cuba Libre near Jacksonville, Florida. They did not see any combat in the short war, but lost 40 men to disease.

That fall, Heck received a thirty-day furlough to return to Racine and accompany the body of fellow Racinian Charles Evenson, who had died of Typhoid Fever. During that trip, he formally took office as City Attorney on August 23, 1898, and the City Council passed a resolution requesting an honorable discharge for him so that he could continue to attend to his responsibilities in the city. The request was transmitted to the Governor, who was commander-in-chief of the state volunteer force, and Congressman Henry Allen Cooper, receiving a prompt favorable reply.

=== Elected office ===
In 1901, he ran for County Judge in the seat being vacated by Judge Ellsworth Burnett Belden, who was opting to run for the Wisconsin Circuit Court seat instead. He won the April election and was inaugurated in January 1902. He went on to win re-election in 1907. In 1913, Judge Heck suffered a form of mental breakdown and was admitted to the Pennoyer Sanitarium to recuperate. He did not run for re-election and left office at the end of his term, in January 1914.

During his time as County Judge, Heck transitioned from the Democratic Party to become a member of the Progressive faction of the Republican Party, which—in Wisconsin—was closely identified with then-Governor Robert M. La Follette. In 1922, Judge Heck was elected to represent Racine County in the Wisconsin State Senate, running as a La Follette Republican, and he was a strong support of La Follette's campaign for the presidency in the 1924 election. Heck was not a candidate for re-election in 1926. In the 1925–1926 session of the Wisconsin Legislature, Senator Heck became the first chairman of the Joint Committee on Taxation.

=== Later years ===
Heck remained active in politics after leaving office, joining the Progressive Party when it officially split from the Republican Party and serving as a state party officer for over a decade. On the day of his death, he was scheduled to preside at a local meeting with U.S. Senator Robert M. La Follette Jr. La Follette still attended the event and paid tribute to the Judge at the event.

He died on October 18, 1938, he fell from his roof while attempting to trim the trees around his home.

== Personal life and family ==
Max Heck married Luella Margaret Pritchard on April 29, 1896. They had one daughter, Margery, who attended Marquette University and became a successful lawyer and worked for a time as deputy clerk of the Wisconsin Circuit Court in Racine County.

Wisconsin Senate
Preceded by John A. Conant	Member of the Wisconsin Senate from the 21st district January 1, 1923 – January 3, 1927	Succeeded by Walter Samuel Goodland
Legal offices
Preceded by Ellsworth Burnett Belden	County Judge of Racine County, Wisconsin; January 6, 1902 – January 5, 1914	Succeeded by Walter C. Palmer
