= Easton, Marathon County, Wisconsin =

Easton, Wisconsin
- Town
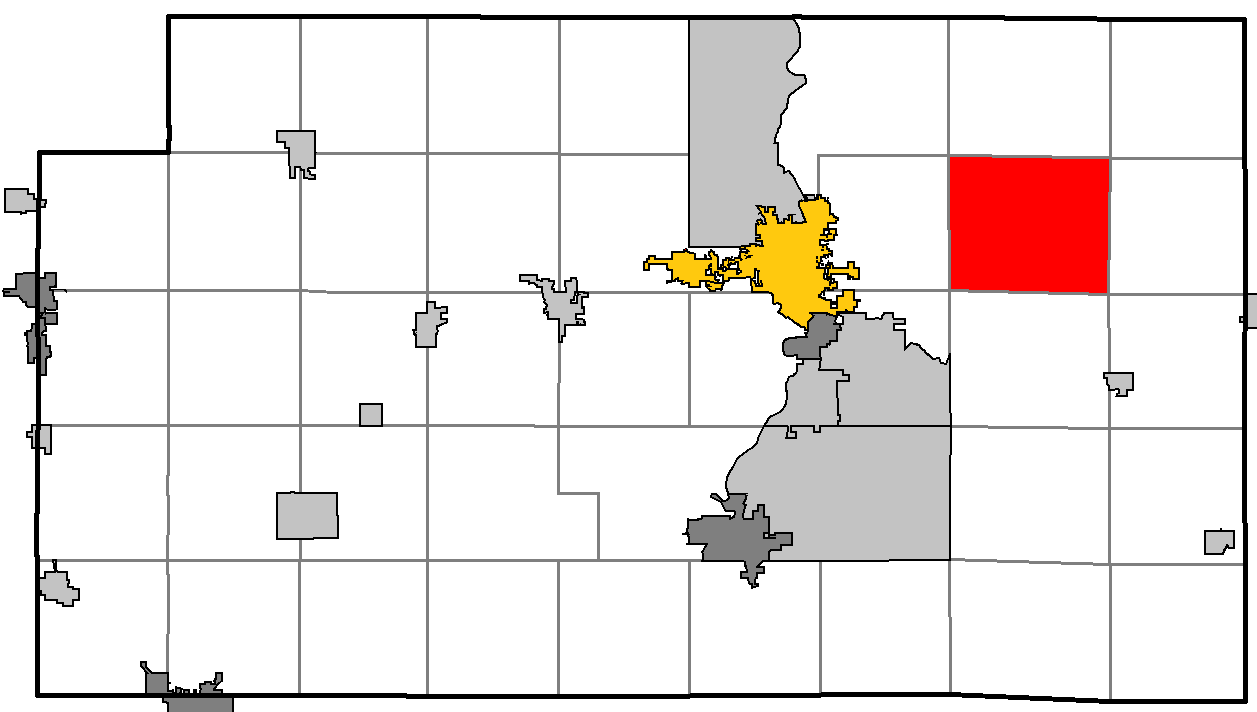
- Location of Easton, Marathon County

- Location of Wisconsin highlighting Marathon County
- Coordinates: 44°59′8″N 89°25′12″W
- Country: United States
- State: Wisconsin
- County: Marathon

Area
  - Total: 42.9 sq mi (111.0 km^{2})
  - Land: 42.9 sq mi (111.0 km^{2})
  - Water: 0 sq mi (0.0 km^{2})
- Elevation: 1,322 ft (403 m)

Population (2020)
  - Total: 1,148
  - Density: 26.79/sq mi (10.34/km^{2})
- Time zone: UTC-6 (Central (CST))
  - Summer (DST): UTC-5 (CDT)
- Area codes: 715 & 534
- FIPS code: 55-22025
- GNIS feature ID: 1583118
- Website: https://www.eastonmcwi.gov/

Easton is a town in northeastern Marathon County, Wisconsin, United States. It is part of the Wausau, Wisconsin Metropolitan Statistical Area. The population was 1,148 at the 2020 census. The unincorporated communities of Johnson and Kalinke are located in the town. The unincorporated community of Sunset is also located partially in the town.

== Geography ==
According to the United States Census Bureau, the town has a total area of 42.9 square miles (111.0 km^{2}), of which 0.015 square miles (0.04 km^{2}), or 0.04%, is water.

== Demographics ==
At the 2020 census there were 1,148 people and 392 households in the town. The population density was 26.8 people per square mile (10.3/km^{2}). There were 461 housing units at an average density of 10.7 per square mile (4.1/km^{2}). The racial makeup of the town was 93.55% White, 0.17% African American, 0.52% American Indian and Alaska Native, 0.78% Asian, 0.35% from other races, and 4.44% from two or more races. Hispanic or Latino of any race were 1.05%.

Of the 392 households 24.2% had children under the age of 18 living with them, 66.8% were married couples living together, 11.2% had a male household with no spouse present, and 10.7% had a female householder with no spouse present. 16.2% of households were one person and 6.8% were one person aged 65 or older. The average family size was 3.00.

The age distribution was 24.2% under the age of 18, 11.8% from 18 to 24, 19.9% from 25 to 44, 28.0% from 45 to 64, and 16.1% 65 or older. The median age was 41.2 years. For every 100 females, there were 109.1 males. For every 100 females age 18 and over, there were 96.1 males.

The median household income was $90,833 and the median family income was $92,500. About 6.2% of the population was below the poverty line, including 9.4% of those under age 18 and 8.5% of those age 65 or over.
