= Henry Stevens (Wisconsin politician) =

19th century American politician

Member of the Wisconsin Senate from the 7th district
- In office January 7, 1867 – January 2, 1871
- Preceded by: Jerome Case
- Succeeded by: Philo Belden

Member of the Wisconsin State Assembly from the Racine 2nd district
- In office January 4, 1864 – January 2, 1865
- Preceded by: Orlando C. Munroe
- Succeeded by: Elijah C. Salisbury

Personal details
- Born: January 26, 1818 Wilton, New Hampshire, U.S.
- Died: July 10, 1875 (aged 57) Racine, Wisconsin, U.S.
- Cause of death: Suicide
- Resting place: Mound Cemetery, Racine
- Party: Republican; Natl. Union (1863–1868)
- Spouse: Eliza Sawtelle
- Parent: John Stevens (father)

Henry Stevens (January 26, 1818 – July 10, 1875) was an American farmer, Republican politician, and Wisconsin pioneer. He was a member of the Wisconsin State Senate, representing Racine County from 1867 through 1870. He also served in the State Assembly during the 1864 session.

== Biography ==
Henry Stevens was born in Wilton, New Hampshire, in January 1818. He was raised and educated there and moved to Caledonia, Wisconsin, in 1855, where he established a farm. In Caledonia, he was elected chairman of the town board. In 1863, in the midst of the American Civil War, he was elected to the Wisconsin State Assembly running on the National Union ticket. He was subsequently elected to the Wisconsin State Senate in 1866 and 1868. He did not run for a third term in 1870.

Stevens killed himself on July 10, 1875, hanging himself from a tree near his home in Caledonia. Obituaries indicated that he had suffered from depression for some time.

== Personal life and family ==
Henry Stevens was the fifth of six children born to John Stevens and his wife Hannah (née Lovejoy). John Stevens served 20 years in the New Hampshire Legislature, representing the towns of Wiltshire and Mason. Henry Stevens' paternal grandfather was also named John Stevens; he was a volunteer in the New Hampshire militia during the American Revolutionary War and served in the Ticonderoga Campaign. His maternal grandfather was Major Samuel Lovejoy, who served as an enlisted man in Nichols' Regiment of Militia in the Battles of Saratoga. The Lovejoys can trace their heritage back to John Lovejoy, an English colonist who came to the Massachusetts Bay Colony as a child in 1630.

Henry Stevens married Eliza Sawtelle of Wiltshire.

Wisconsin State Assembly
Preceded by Orlando C. Munroe	Member of the Wisconsin State Assembly from the Racine 2nd district January 4, 1864 – January 2, 1865	Succeeded by Elijah C. Salisbury
Wisconsin Senate
Preceded by Jerome Case	Member of the Wisconsin Senate from the 7th district January 7, 1867 – January 2, 1871	Succeeded by Philo Belden
