= Nelson R. Norton =

American politician

Member of the Wisconsin State Assembly from the Racine 4th district
- In office January 11, 1854 – January 10, 1855
- Preceded by: Philo Belden
- Succeeded by: Caleb P. Barns

Personal details
- Born: November 8, 1809 Hampton, New York, US
- Party: Democratic

Nelson R. Norton (born November 8, 1809 – ?) was an American politician. He was a member of the Wisconsin State Assembly in 1854. He was a Democrat. He later built the first schooner on Lake Michigan.
