= John Stevens (New Hampshire politician) =

19th century American politician

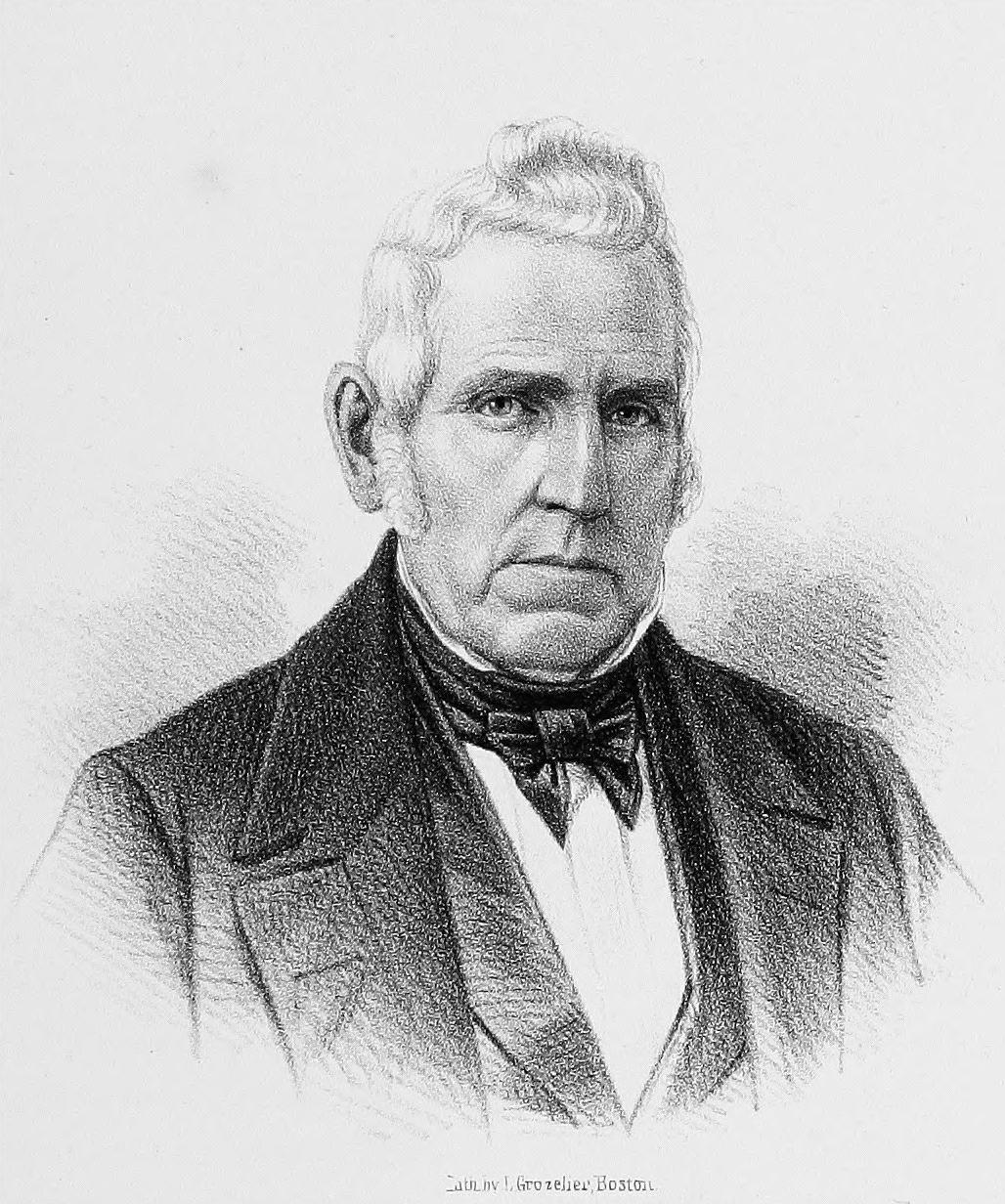
- Lithograph by L. Grozelier

Member of the New Hampshire House of Representatives
- In office June 7, 1826 – June 3, 1835
- Preceded by: Josiah Russell
- Succeeded by: William Wright
- Constituency: Mason district
- In office June 7, 1819 – June 4, 1823
- Preceded by: Abiel Wilson
- Succeeded by: Samuel Abbott
- Constituency: Wilton district

Personal details
- Born: July 21, 1783 Wilton, New Hampshire, U.S.
- Died: March 25, 1848 (aged 64) Mason, New Hampshire, U.S.
- Resting place: Pleasant Street Cemetery, Greenville, New Hampshire
- Party: Whig
- Spouse: Hannah Lovejoy (m. 1807–1848)
- Children: Lydia (Taft)^{(b. 1810; died 1883)}; Sarah (Felt)^{(b. 1811; died 1862)}; John Stevens^{(b. 1813; died 1867)}; Sylvia (Ferguson)^{(b. 1815)}; Henry Stevens^{(b. 1818; died 1875)}; Samuel Lovejoy Stevens^{(b. 1823; died 1876)}

Military service
- Allegiance: United States
- Branch/service: New Hampshire Militia
- Rank: Captain

John Stevens (July 21, 1783 – March 25, 1848) was an American farmer, educator, and politician from the U.S. state of New Hampshire. He served 15 years in the New Hampshire House of Representatives, representing Wilton and later Mason.

== Biography ==
John Stevens was born at Wilton, New Hampshire, in July 1783. His parents were among the earliest settlers at Wilton. He was raised on his father's farm and educated in the common schools. At age 18, he became a school teacher. He quickly earned a reputation as a capable teacher, and spent more than 20 winters teaching schools in the area.

Politically, Stevens was a Whig. He served his first term in the New Hampshire House of Representatives in 1819, representing the town of Wilton. He was subsequently re-elected to the 1820, 1821, and 1822 sessions.

In January 1824, he moved to the town of Mason, New Hampshire, where he was hired as clerk and treasurer of the Mason Cotton Mill Co., working in that role until the company failed. While living in Mason, he was elected to nine more terms in the House of Representatives, serving from 1826 through 1834.

He spent much of the rest of his life working in his workshop and on his farm. He died of heart disease on March 25, 1848.

== Personal life and family ==
John Stevens' father was also known as John Stevens. He was a volunteer in the New Hampshire militia during the American Revolutionary War and was one of the earliest inhabitants of Wilton, New Hampshire.

John Stevens married Hannah Lovejoy on June 6, 1807. Hannah Lovejoy was a descendant of John Lovejoy, who came to the Massachusetts Bay Colony in 1630. John Stevens had six children. Several of his children moved to Caledonia, Wisconsin, in the early years of that town, including Henry Stevens, who became a Wisconsin state senator.
