= Sunset, Wisconsin =

- Unincorporated community
- Location within Wisconsin Location within the United States
- Coordinates: 45°00′12″N 89°29′31″W
- Country: United States
- State: Wisconsin
- County: Marathon
- Elevation: 1,391 ft (424 m)
- Time zone: UTC-6 (Central (CST))
  - Summer (DST): UTC-5 (CDT)
- Area codes: 715 & 534
- GNIS feature ID: 1577846

Sunset is an unincorporated community located in the towns of Easton and Wausau, Marathon County, Wisconsin, United States. Sunset is located along County Highway J at the intersection of County Highway Z, 7.5 miles (12.1 km) east-northeast of the city of Wausau.
