= Philo Belden =

Wisconsin pioneer

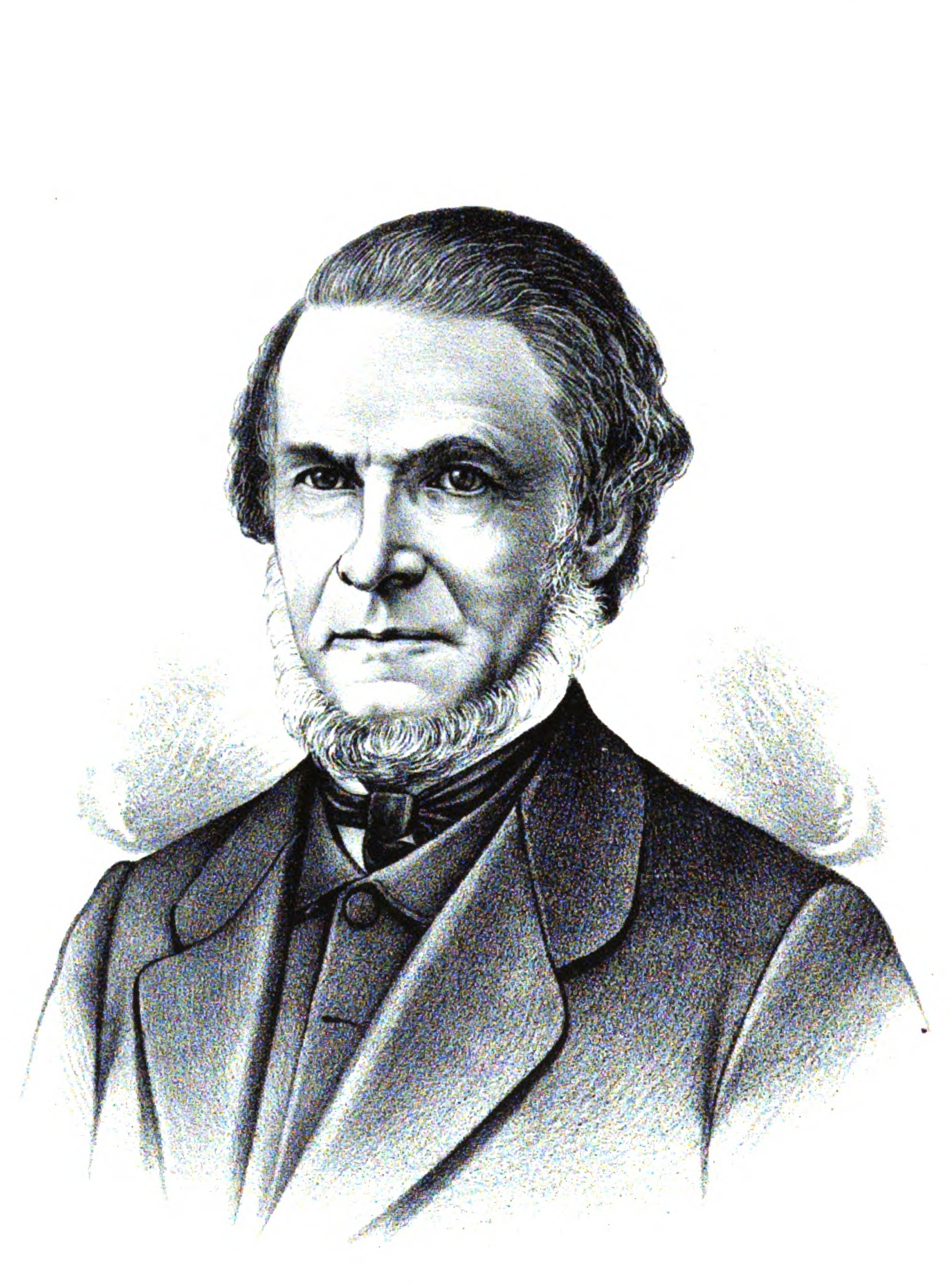
- From Portrait and Biographical Album of Racine and Kenosha Counties, Wisconsin (1892)

County Judge of Racine County, Wisconsin
- In office October 1882 – September 1889
- Appointed by: Jeremiah McLain Rusk
- Preceded by: Charles A. Brownson
- Succeeded by: Ellsworth Burnett Belden

Member of the Wisconsin Senate
- In office 1871, 1872
Senate detail
In office January 1, 1872 – January 6, 1873
Preceded by	Francis Huebschmann
Succeeded by	Robert Hall Baker
Constituency	5th Senate district
In office January 2, 1871 – January 1, 1872
Preceded by	Henry Stevens
Succeeded by	William M. Colladay
Constituency	7th Senate district

Member of the Wisconsin State Assembly
- In office 1853, 1864, 1866
Assembly detail
In office January 1, 1866 – January 7, 1867
Preceded by	Frederick A. Weage
Succeeded by	Position abolished
Constituency	Racine 3rd district
In office January 4, 1864 – January 2, 1865
Preceded by	Hiram L. Gilmore
Succeeded by	Frederick A. Weage
Constituency	Racine 3rd district
In office January 3, 1853 – January 2, 1854
Preceded by	James Catton
Succeeded by	Nelson R. Norton
Constituency	Racine 4th district

Chairman of the Board of Supervisors of Racine County, Wisconsin
- In office April 1854 – April 1855
- Preceded by: Samuel E. Chapman
- Succeeded by: Nelson R. Norton

Personal details
- Born: October 22, 1815 Canaan, Connecticut, U.S.
- Died: September 9, 1889 (aged 73) Rochester, Wisconsin, U.S.
- Resting place: Rochester Cemetery; Rochester, Wisconsin
- Party: Republican; Union (1864–1867); Whig (before 1853)
- Spouse: Mary Francis (m. 1839–1889)
- Children: Henry Ward Belden^{(b. 1840; died 1915)}; Edward D. J. Belden^{(b. 1842; died 1909)}; Albert O. Belden^{(b. 1847; died 1918)}; Allen H. Belden^{(b. 1849; died 1916)}
- Relatives: Ellsworth B. Belden (grandson)
- Profession: Lawyer, Farmer, Businessman, Politician, Judge

Philo Belden (October 22, 1815 – September 9, 1889) was an American lawyer, politician, and Wisconsin pioneer. He was one of the founders of the settlement that is now Rochester, Wisconsin, and represented Racine County for five years in the Wisconsin Legislature; he served two years in the Wisconsin Senate (1871, 1872) and three years in the state Assembly (1853, 1864, 1866). He served the last seven years of his life as county judge of Racine County.

His grandson, Ellsworth Burnett Belden, also became a prominent lawyer and long-serving judge in Racine County.

== Early life ==
Belden was born in Canaan, Connecticut, the sixth child of Jonathan and Love Dean Belden. He left Connecticut in 1835 and purchased land in the Michigan Territory. However, in 1836 he traveled to Racine County, in the Wisconsin Territory, and subsequently decided to sell his land in Michigan and purchased land in Rochester, in western Racine County, in 1838.

== Early years in Wisconsin ==
In October 1839, Belden, along with fellow Racine County pioneers Martin C. Whitman, Levi Godfrey, Obed Hurlbut, and Hiland Hurlbut, plotted all of the village property of Rochester west of the Fox River, and the portion on the east side of the river south of Main Street.

Belden made many investments in the development of Rochester, including a saw mill built in 1840, and a water power-producing dam on the Fox River, built in 1842. Also in 1842, he established the first flour mill in Rochester, which he operated as the sole proprietor until 1846. He also operated an iron factory, which made casings for his mills. And he constructed the first brick chimney in Rochester, bringing bricks from the mouth of Root River.

In 1855, Belden organized the Fox River Valley Railroad company, which attempted to construct a railroad from Richmond, Illinois, to Milwaukee, Wisconsin, traveling through Burlington, Rochester, and Waterford, in Racine County. He won many wealthy investors in Milwaukee and reorganized the company into the Milwaukee and Northern Illinois Railroad, with Belden remaining as President. The company had nearly completed grading of the route but was never able to lay the rail lines. Belden lost a considerable amount of his personal wealth in the failure of the company.

== Political career ==
Belden received his first office in 1839, when he was appointed a justice of the peace for Racine County by Wisconsin Territory governor Henry Dodge. He was re-appointed to the position in 1842 by Dodge's successor, James Duane Doty. He was elected to the Rochester Town Board, served five terms on the Racine County Board, and was Chairman of the County Board in 1854.

He was elected to the Wisconsin Assembly in 1852 as a member of the Whig Party, advocating against slavery and in favor of temperance.

He returned to the Assembly in 1864 and 1866 as a member of the National Union Party, and in 1870 he was elected to represent Racine County in the Wisconsin Senate as a Republican.

In 1882, Belden was appointed to fill a vacant Racine County Judge seat by Governor Jeremiah Rusk. He was elected to a full term as Judge later that year. He resigned the seat in 1889 just a week before his death. His grandson, Ellsworth Burnett Belden, was appointed to finish his judicial term, and was later elected to serve on the Wisconsin Circuit Court.

Philo Belden died on September 9, 1889, in Rochester. His funeral was held on September 11, 1889, at St. Luke's Episcopal Church in Racine, and he was buried at Rochester Cemetery.

== Family life ==
On June 6, 1839, he married Mary Francis Belden of La Porte, Indiana, the daughter of Henry and Fannie Belden. They had four sons, the eldest three served in the Union Army during the American Civil War.

- Henry Ward Belden volunteered in the 24th Wisconsin Infantry Regiment and eventually became a captain in the 37th Wisconsin Infantry Regiment. He married Emily Brown of Rochester, moved to Milwaukee and eventually settled in Tennessee. They had five children, Judge Ellsworth Burnett Belden, Louis Jay Belden, Ruby L. Belden, Robert Brown Belden, and Charles Ezra Belden.
- Edward D. J. Belden joined the 1st Wisconsin Heavy Artillery Regiment and was stationed in Washington, D.C. He married "Nellie" and moved to Oregon and then California after the Civil War.
- Albert O. Belden, who was only 15, enlisted at President Lincoln's call for sixty-day troops and served as a private in the 39th Wisconsin Infantry Regiment. He married Janet Ormiston of Union Grove, Wisconsin, and remained in Rochester. They had a son, Philo Warren Belden.
- Allen H. Belden married Ella Robertson, divorced, and remarried Etta Burns and also remained in Rochester. He had one son with Ella Robertson, Louis Andrew Belden.

Wisconsin State Assembly
Preceded by James Catton	Member of the Wisconsin State Assembly from the Racine 4th district January 3, 1853 – January 2, 1854	Succeeded by Nelson R. Norton
Preceded by Hiram L. Gilmore	Member of the Wisconsin State Assembly from the Racine 3rd district January 4, 1864 – January 2, 1865	Succeeded by Frederick A. Weage
Preceded by Frederick A. Weage	Member of the Wisconsin State Assembly from the Racine 3rd district January 1, 1866 – January 7, 1867	District abolished
Wisconsin Senate
Preceded by Henry Stevens	Member of the Wisconsin Senate from the 7th district January 2, 1871 – January 1, 1872	Succeeded by William M. Colladay
Preceded by Francis Huebschmann	Member of the Wisconsin Senate from the 5th district January 1, 1872 – January 6, 1873	Succeeded by Robert Hall Baker
Legal offices
Preceded by Charles A. Brownson	County Judge of Racine County, Wisconsin; October 1882 – September 1889	Succeeded by Ellsworth Burnett Belden
