= Wausau (town), Wisconsin =

Town of Wausau, Wisconsin
- Town
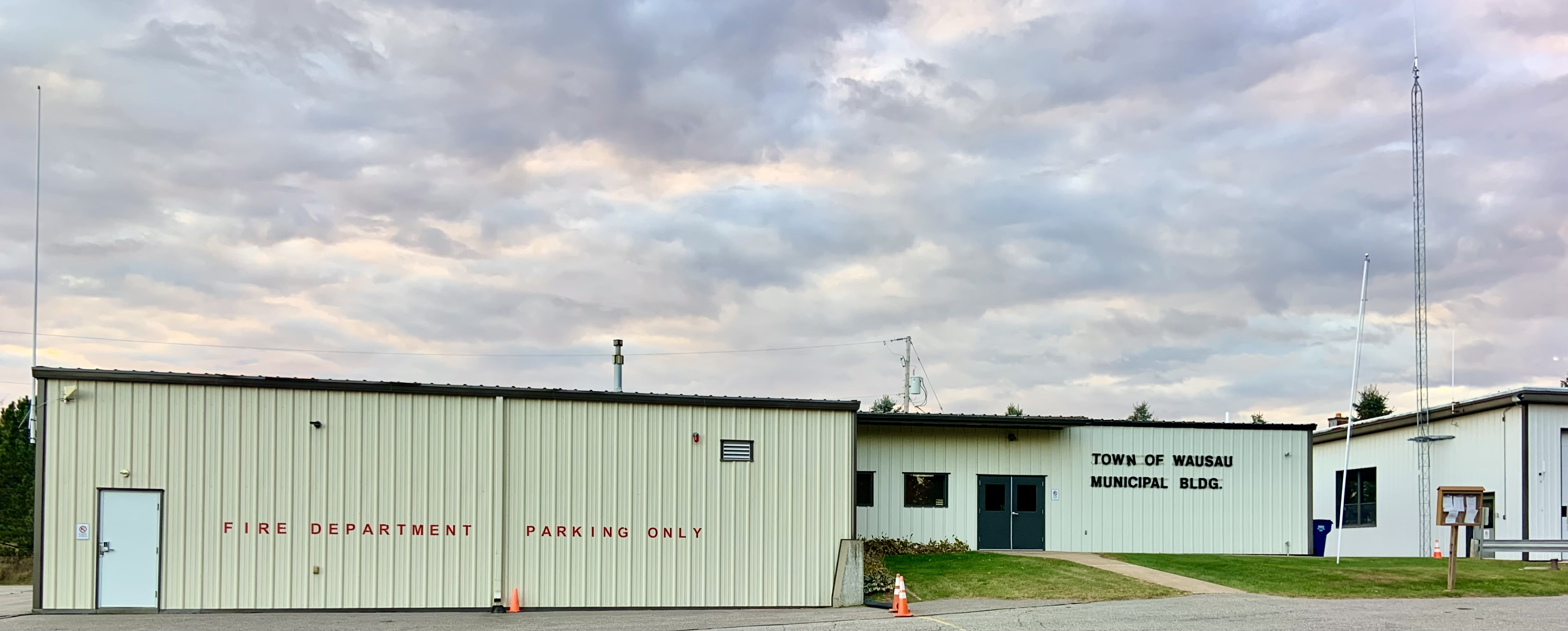
- Town hall

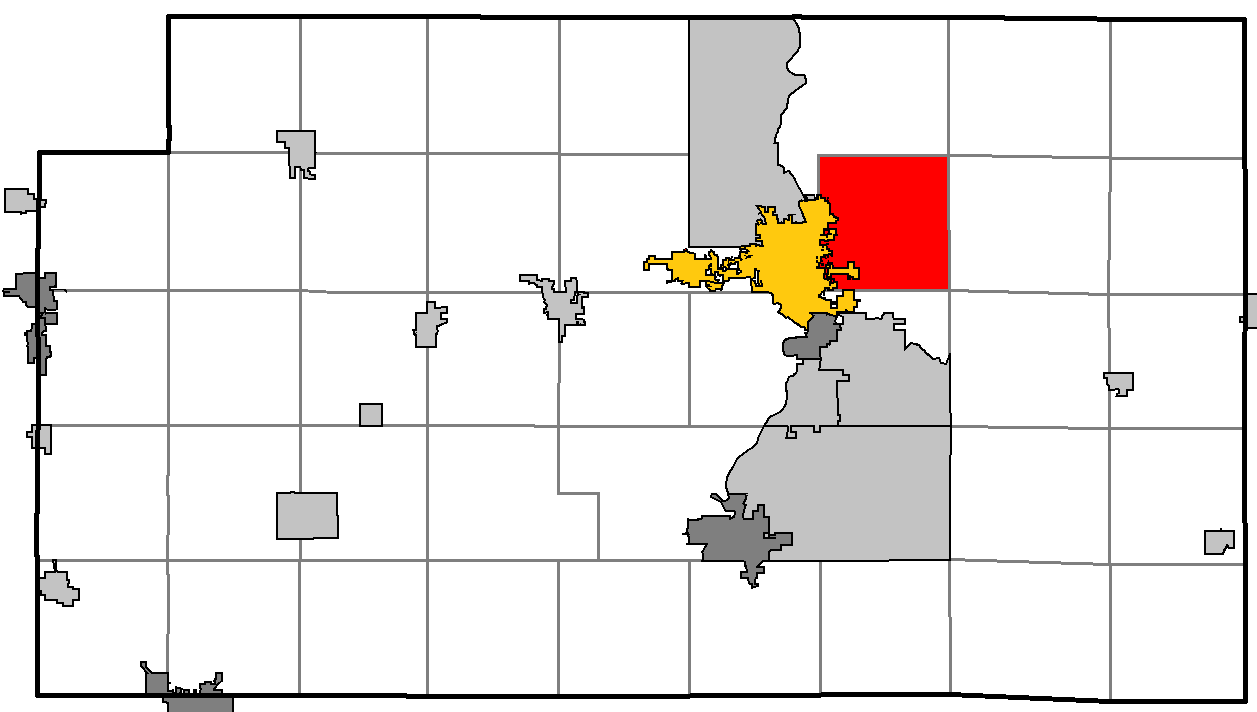
- Location of the Town of Wausau, Marathon County

- Location of Marathon County, Wisconsin
- Coordinates: 44°58′54″N 89°33′19″W
- Country: United States
- State: Wisconsin
- County: Marathon

Area
  - Total: 32.2 sq mi (83.5 km^{2})
  - Land: 32.2 sq mi (83.5 km^{2})
  - Water: 0 sq mi (0.0 km^{2})
- Elevation: 1,407 ft (429 m)

Population (2020)
  - Total: 2,161
  - Density: 67.0/sq mi (25.9/km^{2})
- Time zone: UTC-6 (Central (CST))
  - Summer (DST): UTC-5 (CDT)
- Area codes: 715 & 534
- FIPS code: 55-84500
- GNIS feature ID: 1584380
- Website: www.townofwausau.com

Wausau is a town in Marathon County, Wisconsin, United States. It is part of the Wausau, Wisconsin Metropolitan Statistical Area. The population was 2,161 at the 2020 census. The city of Wausau is located adjacent to and partially within the town. The unincorporated community of Nutterville is located in the town and the unincorporated community of Sunset is partially in the town.

== Geography ==
According to the United States Census Bureau, the town has a total area of 32.2 square miles (83.5 km^{2}), all land.

== Demographics ==
As of the census of 2000, there were 2,214 people, 796 households, and 663 families residing in the town. The population density was 66.1 people per square mile (25.5/km^{2}). There were 825 housing units at an average density of 24.6 per square mile (9.5/km^{2}). The racial makeup of the town was 97.56% White, 0.05% Black or African American, 0.18% Native American, 1.58% Asian, 0.14% from other races, and 0.50% from two or more races. 0.77% of the population were Hispanic or Latino of any race.

There were 796 households, out of which 33.7% had children under the age of 18 living with them, 74.9% were married couples living together, 4.1% had a female householder with no husband present, and 16.6% were non-families. 13.2% of all households were made up of individuals, and 6.0% had someone living alone who was 65 years of age or older. The average household size was 2.77 and the average family size was 3.03.

In the town, the population was spread out, with 24.3% under the age of 18, 7.3% from 18 to 24, 27.5% from 25 to 44, 29.0% from 45 to 64, and 12.0% who were 65 years of age or older. The median age was 40 years. For every 100 females, there were 106.9 males. For every 100 females age 18 and over, there were 104.5 males.

The median income for a household in the town was $51,071, and the median income for a family was $52,500. Males had a median income of $34,964 versus $24,292 for females. The per capita income for the town was $22,248. About 1.5% of families and 2.6% of the population were below the poverty line, including 1.4% of those under age 18 and none of those age 65 or over.
