= Walter D. Corrigan Sr. =

American lawyer and politician (1875–1951)

- Corrigan, circa 1916

District Attorney of Waushara County, Wisconsin
- In office January 1, 1899 – January 1, 1901
- Preceded by: Edward F. Kileen
- Succeeded by: Edward F. Kileen

Personal details
- Born: December 28, 1875 Almond, Wisconsin, U.S.
- Died: November 24, 1951 (aged 75) Mequon, Wisconsin, U.S.
- Resting place: Lone Pine Cemetery, Almond, Wisconsin
- Party: Republican; Progressive (1934–1946)
- Spouses: Jessie Anna Donaldson (died 1925); Libby Miller (m. 1926–1951)
- Children: Walter Dickson Corrigan Jr.^{(b. 1900; died 1938)}; Robert La Follette Corrigan^{(b. 1903; died 1903)}; Helen Francis (Iekel)^{(b. 1905; died 1988)}; Jessie Elizabeth (Pegis)^{(b. 1907; died 1988)}; Paul Corrigan^{(b. 1910; died 1910)}; Thomas MacDonald Corrigan^{(b. 1918; died 1992)}
- Education: Iowa State University; Drake University Law School
- Profession: Lawyer, politician

Walter Dickson Corrigan Sr. (December 28, 1875 – November 24, 1951) was an American lawyer and progressive Republican politician from Wisconsin. He was a protégé of Wisconsin progressive leader Robert M. "Fighting Bob" La Follette. Corrigan served as district attorney of Waushara County, Wisconsin, and was selected as a special prosecutor to try a 1929 civil campaign finance case against then-governor Walter J. Kohler Sr.—it was the only time a sitting Wisconsin governor was put on trial as a defendant.

While attending Iowa State University, he was a star athlete in baseball and football, playing under coach Pop Warner.

== Biography ==
Corrigan was born Walter Dickson Corrigan on December 28, 1875, in Almond, Wisconsin. He would attend Iowa State University, where he was a member of the baseball and football teams, and Drake University Law School.

Corrigan married twice. First, to Jessie Anna Donaldson, who died in 1925. Second, to Libby Miller, who died in 1976. He had six children. Corrigan died on November 25, 1951, in Mequon, Wisconsin.

== Political career ==
Corrigan was district attorney of Waushara County, Wisconsin, from 1899 to 1901 and Assistant Attorney General of Wisconsin from 1903 to 1905 as a Republican. In 1934 and 1940, Corrigan was a candidate for the United States House of Representatives from Wisconsin's 6th congressional district as a member of the Wisconsin Progressive Party. He lost to incumbent Michael Reilly in 1934 and to incumbent Frank Bateman Keefe in 1940. Additionally, he was an unsuccessful candidate for the Wisconsin Supreme Court.

== Electoral history ==
Wisconsin Supreme Court Election, 1916
Party	Candidate	Votes	%	±%
General Election, April 1916
Nonpartisan	Franz C. Eschweiler	70,380	23.40%	
Nonpartisan	William J. Turner	64,568	21.46%	
Nonpartisan	Ellsworth B. Belden	57,670	19.17%	
Nonpartisan	Walter D. Corrigan	56,666	18.84%	
Nonpartisan	Chester A. Fowler	51,033	16.97%	
	Scattering	489	0.16%	
Total votes		300,806	100.0%	

Legal offices
Preceded by Edward F. Kileen	District Attorney of Waushara County, Wisconsin; January 1, 1899 – January 1, 1901	Succeeded by Edward F. Kileen
