= Franz C. Eschweiler =

American lawyer and judge (1863–1929)

The Honorable Franz C. Eschweiler
- Eschweiler, as a justice

Justice of the Wisconsin Supreme Court
- In office August 30, 1916 – November 14, 1929
- Appointed by: Emanuel L. Philipp
- Preceded by: William H. Timlin
- Succeeded by: Edward T. Fairchild

Wisconsin Circuit Court Judge for the 2nd Circuit, Branch 6
- In office January 1, 1911 – August 30, 1916
- Preceded by: Branch established
- Succeeded by: Edward T. Fairchild

Personal details
- Born: Franz Chadbourne Eschweiler; September 6, 1863 Houghton, Michigan
- Died: November 14, 1929 (aged 66) Madison, Wisconsin
- Resting place: Calvary Cemetery, Milwaukee, Wisconsin
- Spouses: Ida Caroline Kindt; (died 1952)
- Children: at least 3
- Parents: Carl Ferdinand Eschweiler (father); Hannah Lincoln (Chadbourne) Eschweiler (mother)
- Relatives: Alexander C. Eschweiler (Brother), Thomas Chadbourne (Cousin)

Franz Chadbourne Eschweiler (September 6, 1863 – November 14, 1929) was an American lawyer and judge from Wisconsin. He was a justice of the Wisconsin Supreme Court for the last 13 years of his life. He previously served five and a half years as a Wisconsin circuit court judge in Milwaukee County.

== Biography ==
Born in Houghton, Michigan, Eschweiler studied at the University of Michigan and the University of Iowa. Eschweiler was admitted to the bar in Milwaukee, Wisconsin, in 1889, and practiced law, in Milwaukee. In 1910, he was elected a Wisconsin Circuit Court judge for the newly created 6th Branch of the Milwaukee County-based 2nd Circuit. Rather than running for re-election in 1916, he ran for a seat on the Wisconsin Supreme Court, set to be vacated by the pending retirement of justice William H. Timlin. Eschweiler won the spring 1916 election, and was appointed to begin his term early—in August 1916—following Timlin's death. Eschweiler ultimately served on the Wisconsin Supreme Court until his own death in 1929.

== Electoral history ==
=== Wisconsin Circuit Court (1910) ===
1910 Wisconsin Circuit Court, 2nd Circuit Branch 6 election
Party	Candidate	Votes	%	±%
General Election, April 1910
Nonpartisan	Franz C. Eschweiler	14,641	35.96	
Nonpartisan	John C. Kleist	14,325	35.18	
Nonpartisan	Julius E. Roehr	6,877	16.89	
Nonpartisan	Casimir Gonski	4,875	11.97	
Total votes		40,718	100	

=== Wisconsin Supreme Court (1916, 1926) ===
1916 Wisconsin Supreme Court election
Party	Candidate	Votes	%	±%
General Election, April 1916
Nonpartisan	Franz C. Eschweiler	70,380	23.40	
Nonpartisan	William J. Turner	64,568	21.46	
Nonpartisan	Ellsworth B. Belden	57,670	19.17	
Nonpartisan	Walter D. Corrigan	56,666	18.84	
Nonpartisan	Chester A. Fowler	51,033	16.97	
	Scattering	489	0.16	
Total votes		300,806	100	

1926 Wisconsin Supreme Court election
Party	Candidate	Votes	%	±%
General Election, April 6, 1926
Nonpartisan	Franz C. Eschweiler (incumbent)	293,857	100	
Total votes		293,857	100	

Legal offices
Preceded by Branch established	Wisconsin Circuit Court Judge for the 2nd Circuit, Branch 6; 1911 – 1916	Succeeded by Edward T. Fairchild
Preceded by William H. Timlin	Justice of the Wisconsin Supreme Court; 1916 – 1929	Succeeded by Edward T. Fairchild
