= Kalinke, Wisconsin =

Unincorporated community in Wisconsin, United States

- Unincorporated community
- Location within Wisconsin Location within the United States
- Coordinates: 45°01′50″N 89°23′49″W
- Country: United States
- State: Wisconsin
- County: Marathon
- Elevation: 1,463 ft (446 m)
- Time zone: UTC-6 (Central (CST))
  - Summer (DST): UTC-5 (CDT)
- Postal code: 54408
- Area codes: 715 and 534
- GNIS feature ID: 1577670

Kalinke is an unincorporated community located in the town of Hewitt, Marathon County, Wisconsin, United States. The community is named for Gottlieb Kalinke, the farmer who had owned the land surrounding the community. The original red brick Kalinke House still stands there today
