= John Phillips (Wisconsin politician) =

American politician

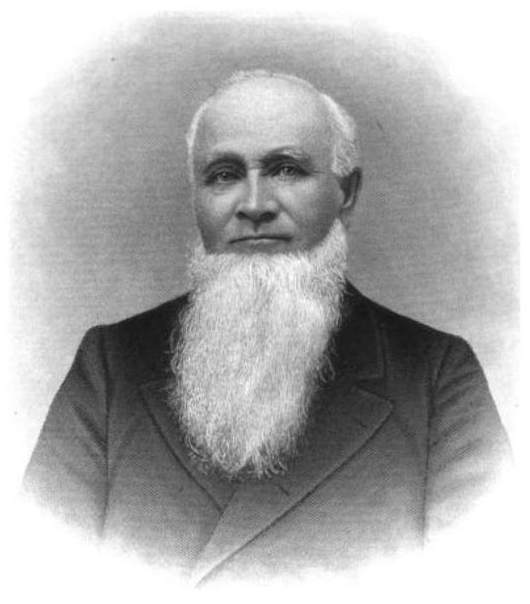

Member of the Wisconsin State Senate
- In office 1891

Member of the Wisconsin State Assembly
- In office 1860, 1864

Personal details
- Born: November 4, 1823 Richmond, Vermont
- Died: July 26, 1903 (aged 79) Stevens Point, Wisconsin
- Party: Republican
- Education: Rush Medical College
- Occupation: Physician, politician

John Phillips (November 4, 1823 – July 26, 1903) was an American physician and politician.

== Biography ==
John Phillips was born in Richmond, Vermont. He moved to Wiota, Wisconsin Territory in 1846, where he taught school and studied medicine. In 1848, he moved to Stevens Point, Wisconsin. Phillips graduated from Rush Medical College in 1853.

He was an abolitionist. He served in local government in town government, board of education, and on the Portage County, Wisconsin Board of Supervisors. He served in the Wisconsin State Assembly in 1860 and 1864 as a Republican and in the Wisconsin State Senate in 1891. He also served on the Wisconsin Normal School Board of Regents and on the United States Military Academy Board of Visitors.

Phillips died in Stevens Point on July 26, 1903.
