= Frank H. Hanson =

American politician (1884–1940)

Frank H. Hanson was a member of the Wisconsin State Senate and the Wisconsin State Assembly.

== Biography ==
Hanson was born on May 29, 1884, in Mauston, Wisconsin. He died on August 30, 1940, in Los Angeles, California, where he had gone for his health.

== Career ==
Hanson was elected to the Senate in 1914. Later, he was a member of the Assembly during the 1921 session. Additionally, he was District Attorney of Juneau County, Wisconsin, from 1909 to 1914 and, Mayor of Mauston. City Attorney of Mauston in 1910, 1911 and 1916, as well as a member of the Republican State Central Committee.
