= 2025 Dane County Executive election =

- April 1, 2025
Candidate	Melissa Agard	Stephen Ratzlaff
Popular vote	199,932	46,432
Percentage	80.81%	18.77%
- County results Agard: 50–60% 60–70% 70–80% 80–90% >90% No Votes
County executive before election
Melissa Agard
Elected County executive
Melissa Agard

The 2025 Dane County executive election was held on April 1, 2025. Incumbent County Executive Melissa Agard, who had just been elected months earlier in a 2024 special election, ran for re-election to a full term. Agard's only opponent was salesman Stephen Ratzlaff, a former State Assembly candidate.

In seeking re-election, Agard noted that her "number one priority" was "be[ing] a responsible and good steward of tax dollars," noting that her "approach focuses on fiscal responsibility, smart investments and accountability in government spending." Ratzlaff, meanwhile, ran on a single-issue platform of reducing property taxes, arguing that "property taxes have increased at a rate that is unsustainable."

Agard won re-election in a landslide, receiving 81 percent of the vote to Ratzlaff's 19 percent.

== General election ==
=== Candidates ===
- Melissa Agard, incumbent county executive
- Stephen Ratzlaff, salesman, former state assembly candidate

==== Declined ====
- Dana Pellebon, county supervisor, 2024 candidate for county executive

=== Endorsements ===
Melissa Agard

Organizations

- Wisconsin State AFL-CIO

Newspapers

- The Capital Times

=== Results ===
2025 Dane County executive election
Party	Candidate	Votes	%
Nonpartisan	Melissa Agard (inc.)	199,932	80.81%
Nonpartisan	Stephen Ratzlaff	46,432	18.77%
Write-in		1,059	0.43%
Total votes		247,423	100.00%
