= Wisconsin's 16th Senate district =

American legislative district in Dane County, Wisconsin

Wisconsin's 16th State Senate district
- 2024 map defined in 2023 Wisc. Act 94; 2022 map defined in Johnson v. Wisconsin Elections Commission; 2011 map was defined in 2011 Wisc. Act 43 composed of Assembly districts 46, 47, and 48
Senator
Melissa Ratcliff; D–Cottage Grove
since January 6, 2025 (1 year, 129 days)
- Demographics: 83.03% White; 5.02% Black; 6.31% Hispanic; 3.85% Asian; 1.51% Native American; 0.11% Hawaiian/Pacific Islander
- Population (2020) • Voting age: 177,313; 137,206
- Website: Official website
- Notes: South-central Wisconsin

The 16th Senate district of Wisconsin is one of 33 districts in the Wisconsin Senate. Located in south-central Wisconsin, the district comprises much of eastern Dane County, western Jefferson County, and part of southwest Dodge County. It includes the cities of Fitchburg, Fort Atkinson, Lake Mills, Stoughton, Sun Prairie, and Waterloo, and the villages of Cottage Grove, Deerfield, and Marshall, and parts of the city of Madison and the village of McFarland. It also contains Lake Kegonsa State Park and most of Lake Koshkonong.

== Current elected officials ==
Melissa Ratcliff is the senator representing the 16th district. She was first elected in the 2024 general election. Before serving as senator, she served in the Wisconsin State Assembly from 2023 to 2025, representing Sun Prairie and Madison's far east side.

Each Wisconsin State Senate district is composed of three Wisconsin State Assembly districts. The 16th Senate district comprises the 46th, 47th, and 48th Assembly districts. The current representatives of those districts are:

- Assembly District 46: Joan Fitzgerald (D–Fort Atkinson)
- Assembly District 47: Randy Udell (D–Fitchburg)
- Assembly District 48: Andrew Hysell (D–Sun Prairie)

The district crosses two congressional districts. The portion of the district in Dodge and Jefferson counties fall within Wisconsin's 5th congressional district, which is represented by U.S. Representative Scott L. Fitzgerald. The remainder of the district, in Dane County, falls within Wisconsin's 2nd congressional district, represented by U.S. Representative Mark Pocan.

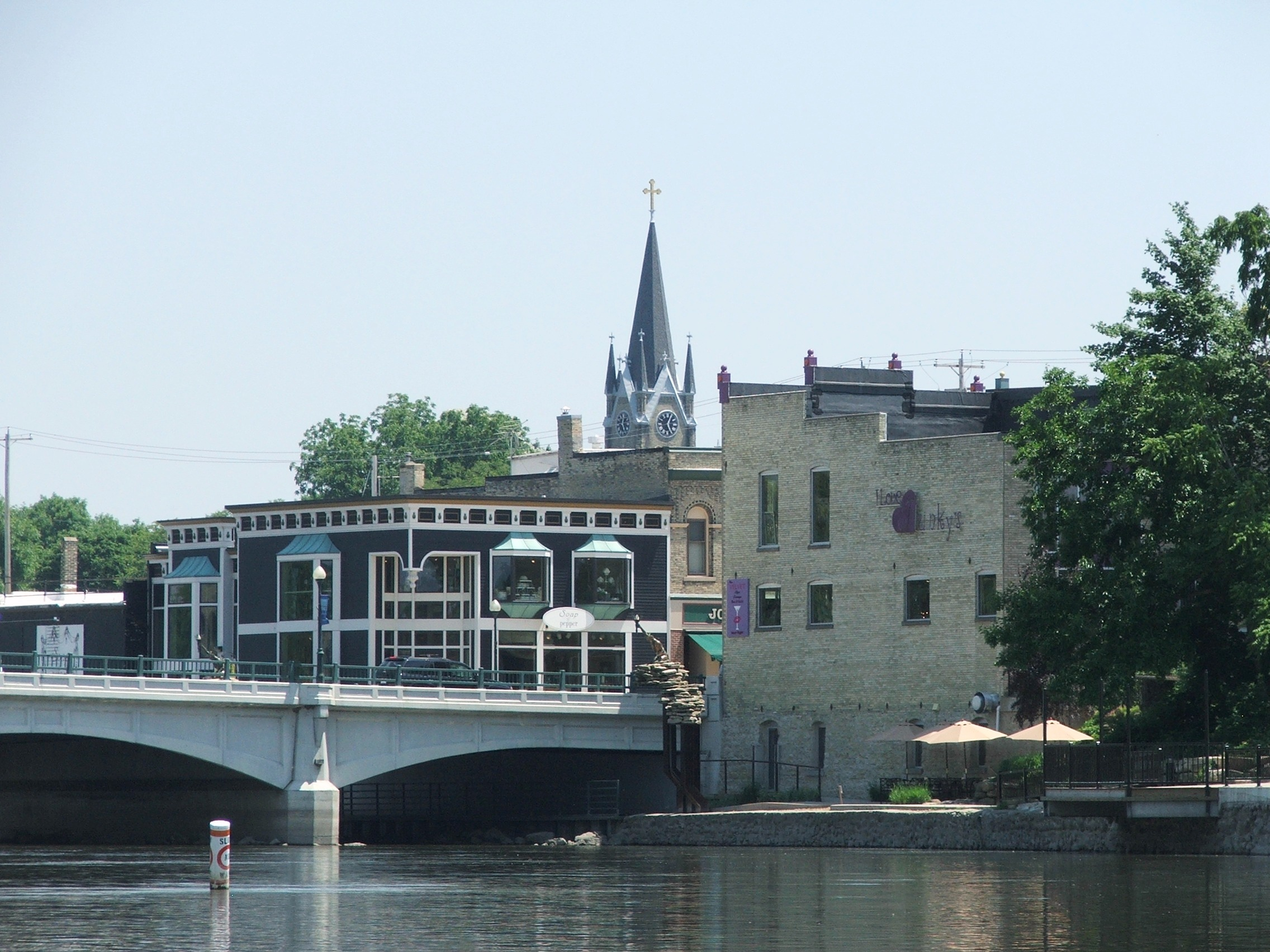
Downtown Fort Atkinson

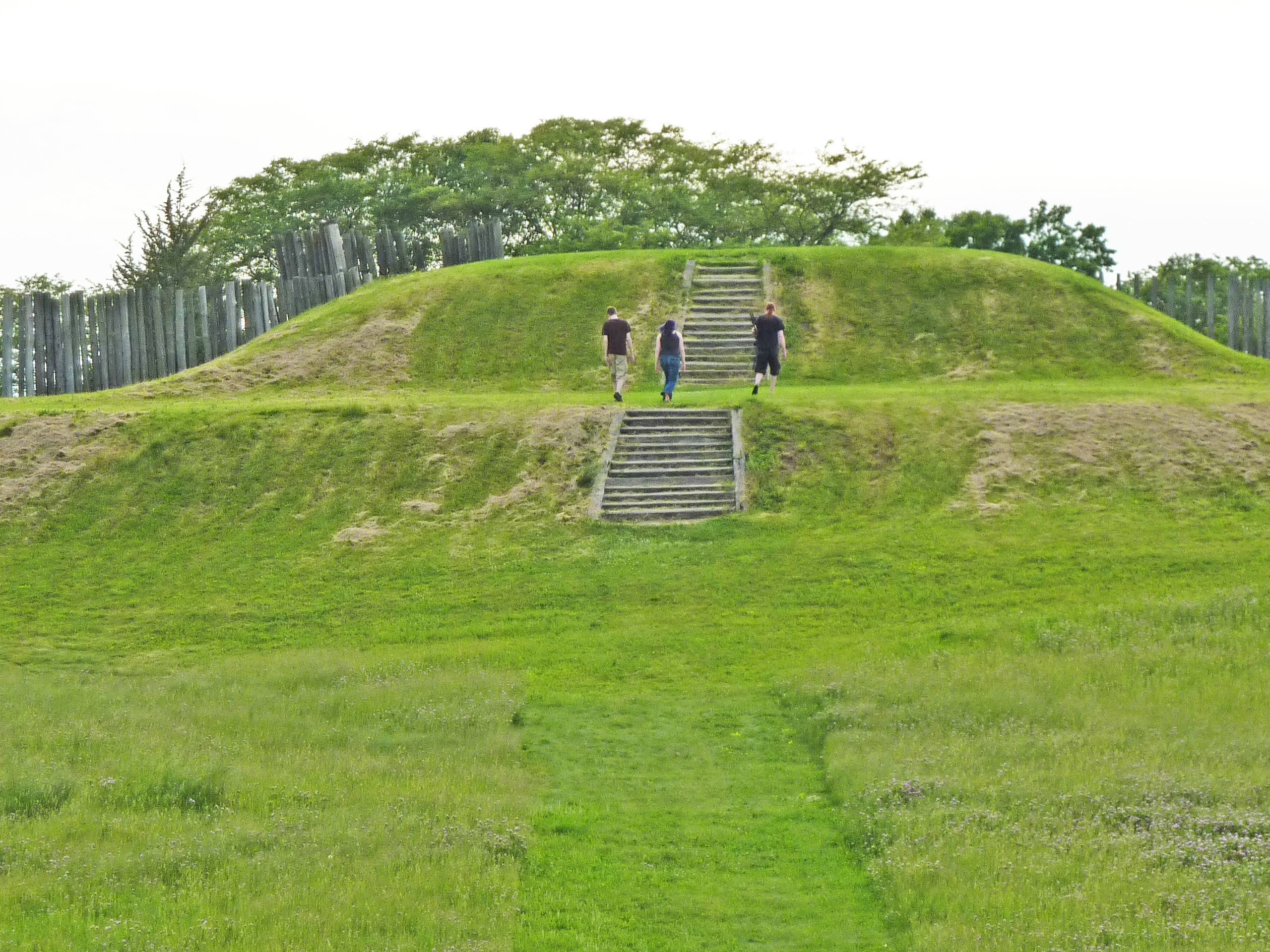
Aztalan State Park

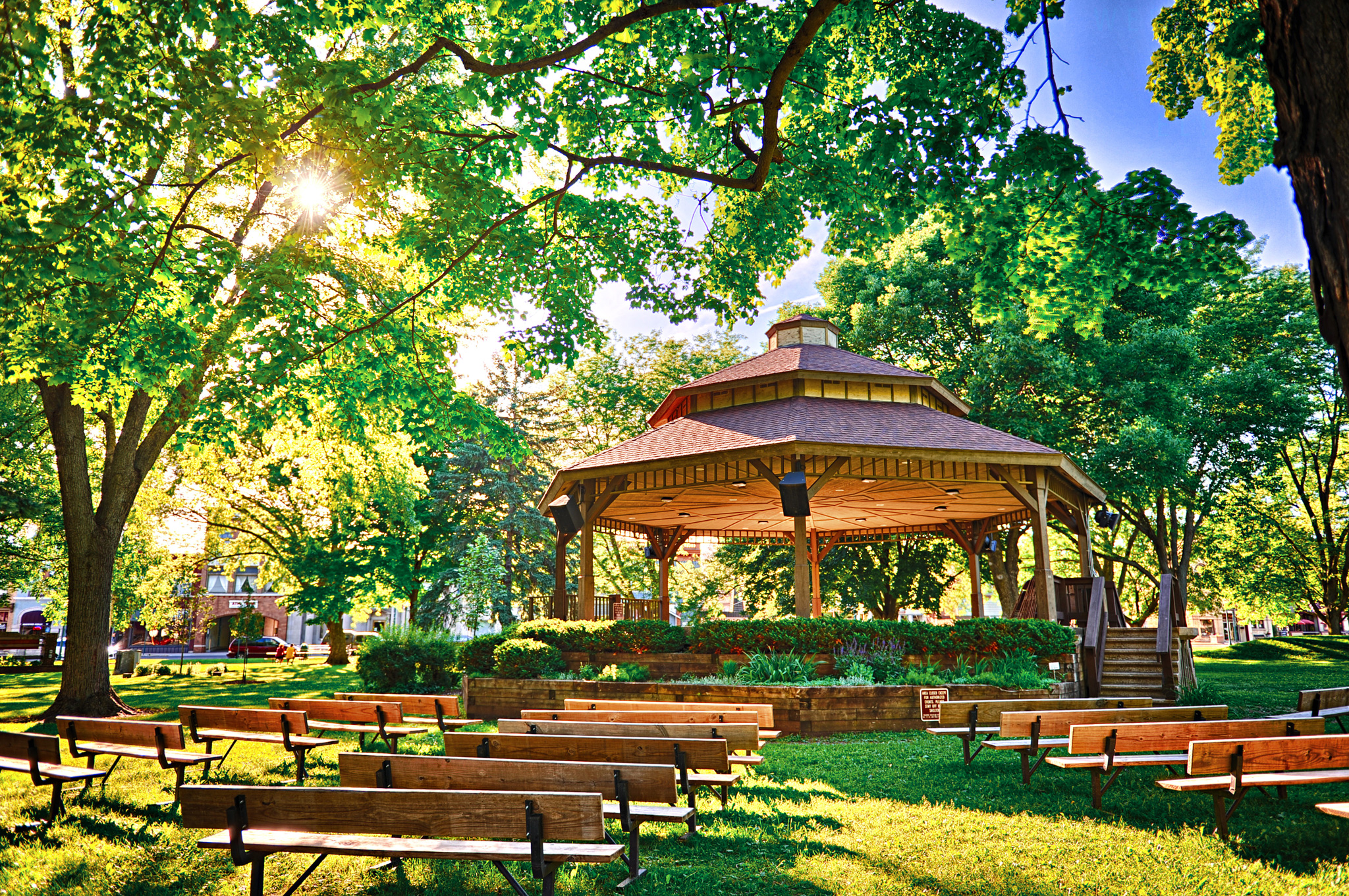
Commons Park, downtown Lake Mills

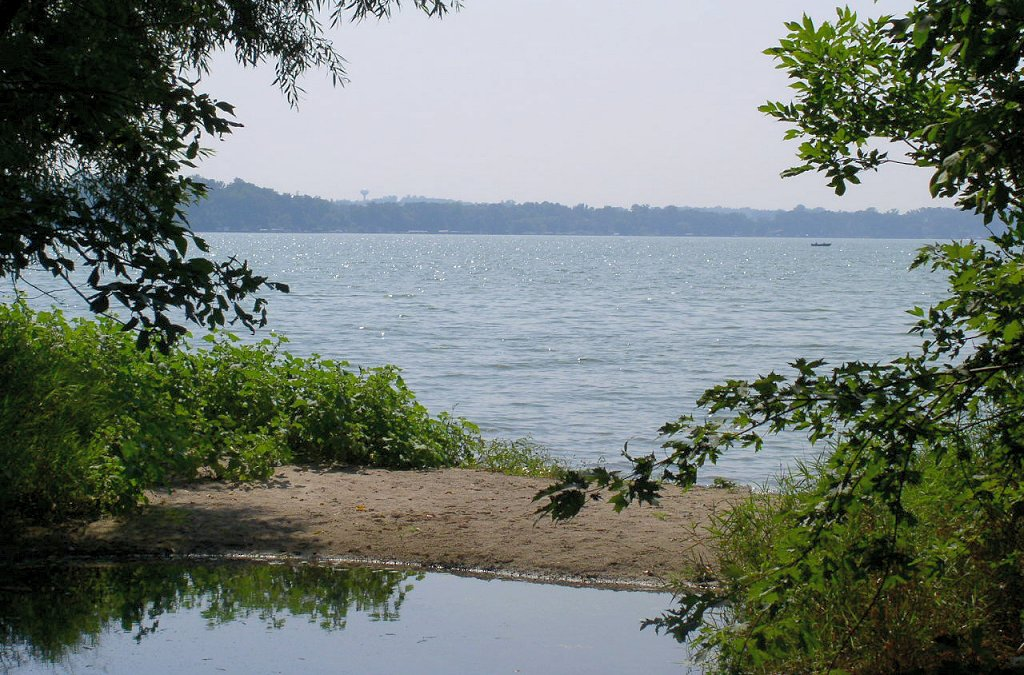
Lake Kegonsa State Park

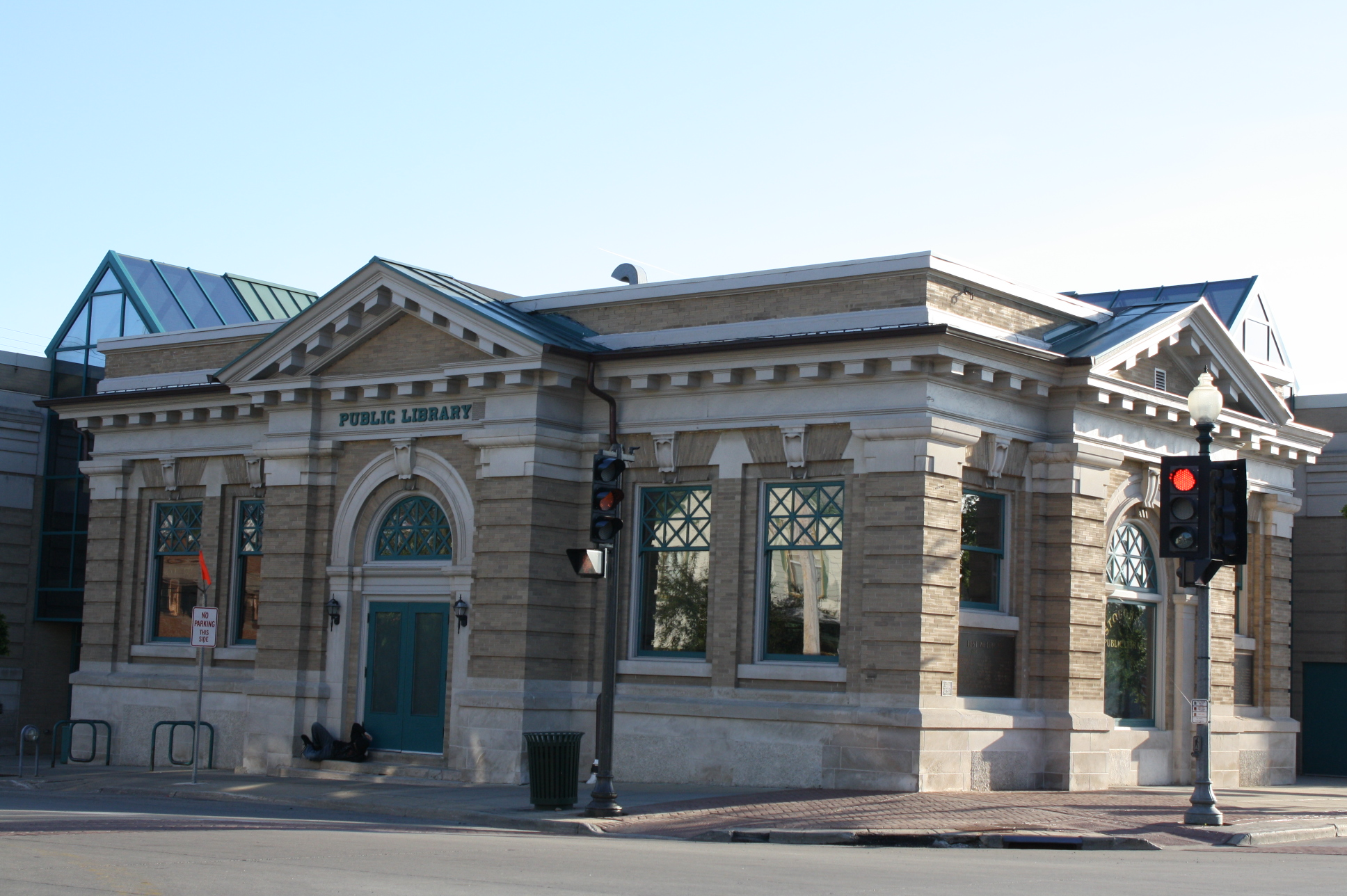
Stoughton public library

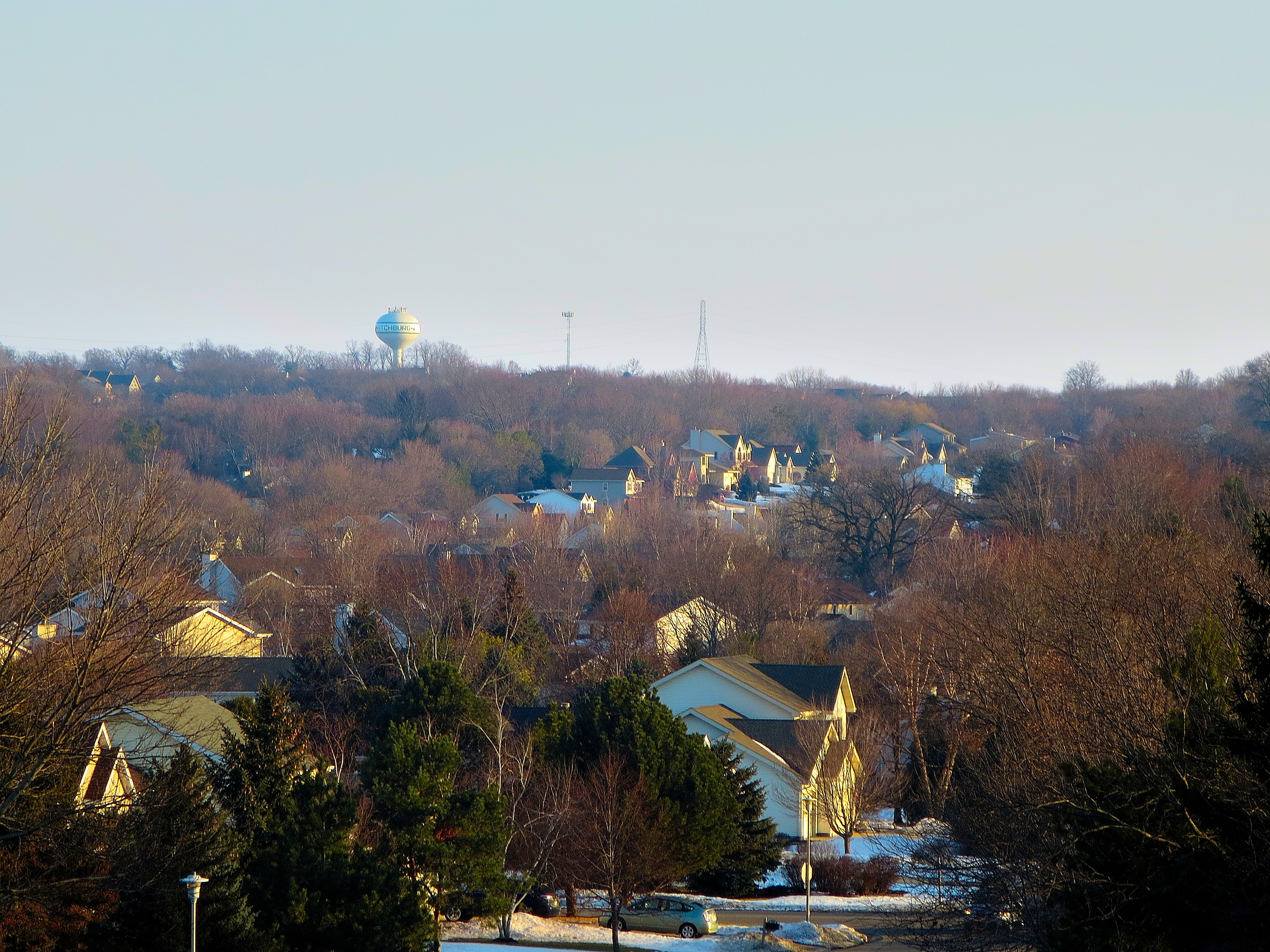
Neighborhood in Fitchburg.

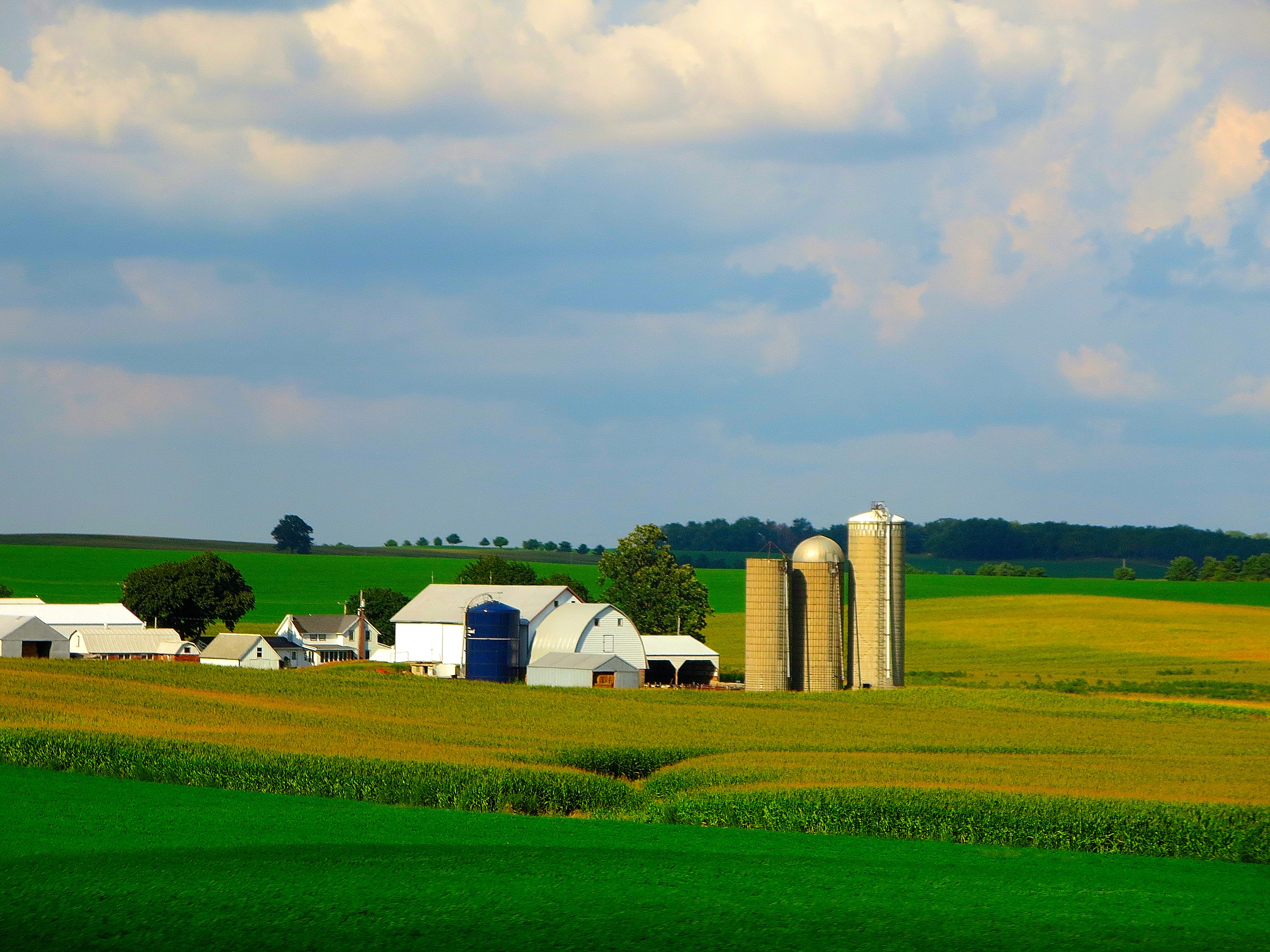
Fitchburg farm

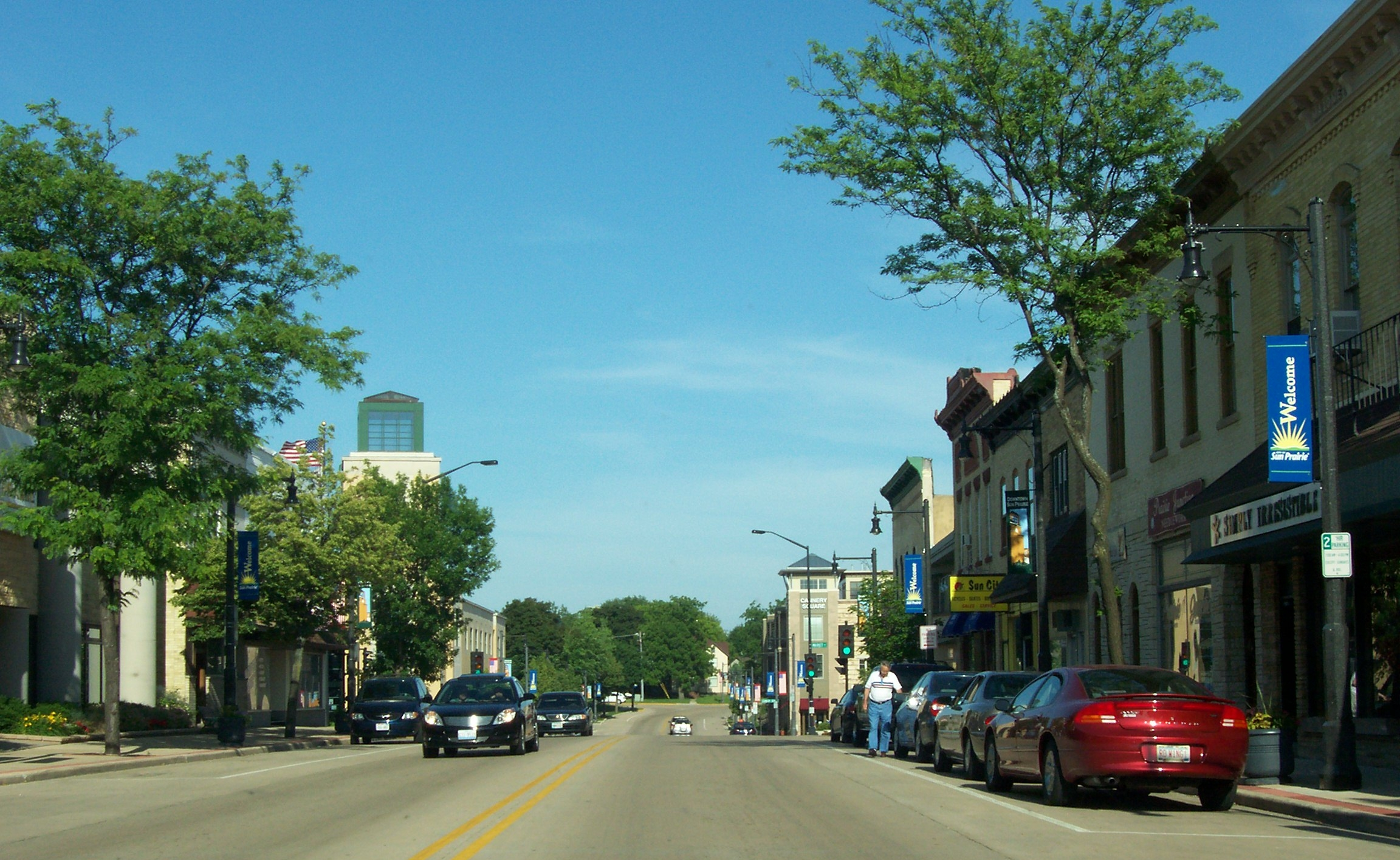
Downtown Sun Prairie

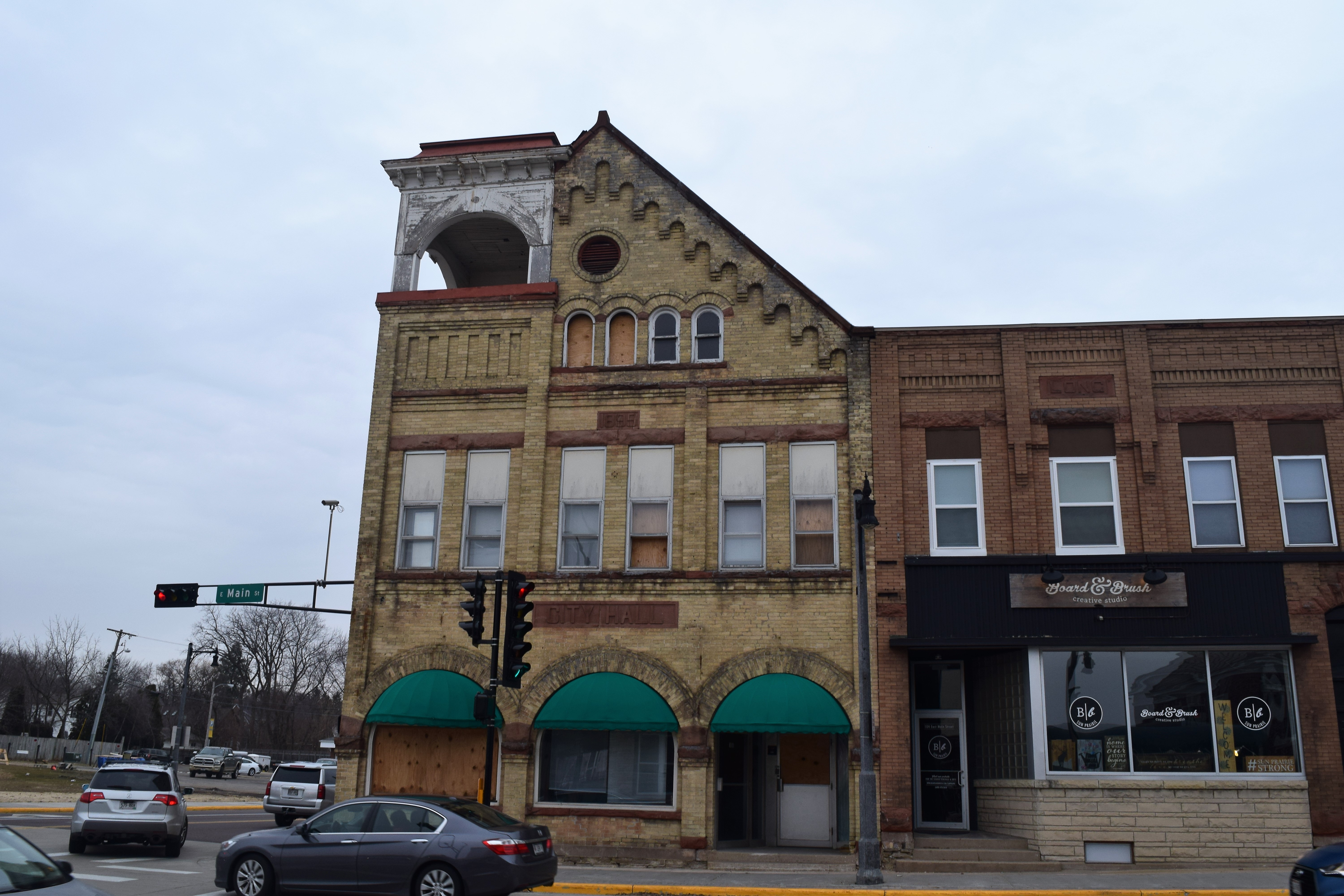
Sun Prairie Downtown Historic District

== Past senators ==
Notable past senators include:

- Christopher Latham Sholes, 1848-1850, "father of the typewriter"
- John Sharpstein, 1852, Justice of the Supreme Court of California
- Nelson Dewey, 1854-1856, 1st governor of Wisconsin
- J. Allen Barber, 1856-1858, U.S. Congressman (1871-1875), 15th Speaker of the Wisconsin State Assembly
- George Cochrane Hazelton, 1868-1872, U.S. Congressman (1877-1883), 1st Attorney General for the District of Columbia
- John J. Blaine, 1909-1913, 24th governor of Wisconsin, United States Senator (1927-1933)
- Gaylord Nelson, 1949-1958, 35th governor of Wisconsin, United States Senator (1963-1981)
- Charles Chvala, 1985-2005, Majority Leader (1999-2002)
- Mark F. Miller, 2005-2021, Majority Leader (2012-2013)

Senator	Party	Notes	Session	Years	District Definition
District created				1848	Kenosha County
C. Latham Sholes	Dem.		1st	1848	Kenosha County
C. Latham Sholes	Free Soil		2nd	1849	Kenosha County
Elijah Steele	Dem.	Resigned.	3rd	1850	Kenosha County
Orson S. Head	Whig	Won 1851 special election.	4th	1851	Kenosha County
John Sharpstein	Dem.	Redistricted to 8th district	5th	1852	Kenosha County
Joel C. Squires	Dem.	Resigned.	6th	1853	1852–1855 1856–1860 1861–1865 1866–1870 1871–1875 1876–1881 1882–1887; Grant County
James W. Seaton	Dem.	Won 1853 special election	6th	1853	1852–1855 1856–1860 1861–1865 1866–1870 1871–1875 1876–1881 1882–1887; Grant County
Nelson Dewey	Dem.		7th	1854	1852–1855 1856–1860 1861–1865 1866–1870 1871–1875 1876–1881 1882–1887; Grant County
Nelson Dewey	Dem.		8th	1855	1852–1855 1856–1860 1861–1865 1866–1870 1871–1875 1876–1881 1882–1887; Grant County
J. Allen Barber	Rep.		9th	1856	1852–1855 1856–1860 1861–1865 1866–1870 1871–1875 1876–1881 1882–1887; Grant County
J. Allen Barber	Rep.		10th	1857	1852–1855 1856–1860 1861–1865 1866–1870 1871–1875 1876–1881 1882–1887; Grant County
Noah Virgin	Rep.		11th	1858	1852–1855 1856–1860 1861–1865 1866–1870 1871–1875 1876–1881 1882–1887; Grant County
Noah Virgin	Rep.		12th	1859	1852–1855 1856–1860 1861–1865 1866–1870 1871–1875 1876–1881 1882–1887; Grant County
Noah Virgin	Rep.		13th	1860	1852–1855 1856–1860 1861–1865 1866–1870 1871–1875 1876–1881 1882–1887; Grant County
Noah Virgin	Rep.		14th	1861	1852–1855 1856–1860 1861–1865 1866–1870 1871–1875 1876–1881 1882–1887; Grant County
Milas K. Young	Rep.		15th	1862	1852–1855 1856–1860 1861–1865 1866–1870 1871–1875 1876–1881 1882–1887; Grant County
Milas K. Young	Rep.		16th	1863	1852–1855 1856–1860 1861–1865 1866–1870 1871–1875 1876–1881 1882–1887; Grant County
Milas K. Young	Natl. Union		17th	1864	1852–1855 1856–1860 1861–1865 1866–1870 1871–1875 1876–1881 1882–1887; Grant County
Milas K. Young	Natl. Union		18th	1865	1852–1855 1856–1860 1861–1865 1866–1870 1871–1875 1876–1881 1882–1887; Grant County
John H. Rountree	Natl. Union		19th	1866	1852–1855 1856–1860 1861–1865 1866–1870 1871–1875 1876–1881 1882–1887; Grant County
John H. Rountree	Natl. Union		20th	1867	1852–1855 1856–1860 1861–1865 1866–1870 1871–1875 1876–1881 1882–1887; Grant County
George C. Hazelton	Rep.		21st	1868	1852–1855 1856–1860 1861–1865 1866–1870 1871–1875 1876–1881 1882–1887; Grant County
George C. Hazelton	Rep.		22nd	1869	1852–1855 1856–1860 1861–1865 1866–1870 1871–1875 1876–1881 1882–1887; Grant County
George C. Hazelton	Rep.		23rd	1870	1852–1855 1856–1860 1861–1865 1866–1870 1871–1875 1876–1881 1882–1887; Grant County
George C. Hazelton	Rep.		24th	1871	1852–1855 1856–1860 1861–1865 1866–1870 1871–1875 1876–1881 1882–1887; Grant County
John C. Holloway	Rep.		25th	1872	1852–1855 1856–1860 1861–1865 1866–1870 1871–1875 1876–1881 1882–1887; Grant County
John C. Holloway	Rep.		26th	1873	1852–1855 1856–1860 1861–1865 1866–1870 1871–1875 1876–1881 1882–1887; Grant County
John C. Holloway	Rep.		27th	1874	1852–1855 1856–1860 1861–1865 1866–1870 1871–1875 1876–1881 1882–1887; Grant County
John C. Holloway	Rep.		28th	1875	1852–1855 1856–1860 1861–1865 1866–1870 1871–1875 1876–1881 1882–1887; Grant County
Oscar C. Hathaway	Rep.		29th	1876	1852–1855 1856–1860 1861–1865 1866–1870 1871–1875 1876–1881 1882–1887; Grant County
Oscar C. Hathaway	Rep.		30th	1877	1852–1855 1856–1860 1861–1865 1866–1870 1871–1875 1876–1881 1882–1887; Grant County
Oscar C. Hathaway	Rep.		31st	1878	1852–1855 1856–1860 1861–1865 1866–1870 1871–1875 1876–1881 1882–1887; Grant County
Oscar C. Hathaway	Rep.		32nd	1879	1852–1855 1856–1860 1861–1865 1866–1870 1871–1875 1876–1881 1882–1887; Grant County
George W. Ryland	Rep.		33rd	1880	1852–1855 1856–1860 1861–1865 1866–1870 1871–1875 1876–1881 1882–1887; Grant County
George W. Ryland	Rep.		34th	1881	1852–1855 1856–1860 1861–1865 1866–1870 1871–1875 1876–1881 1882–1887; Grant County
George W. Ryland	Rep.		35th	1882	1852–1855 1856–1860 1861–1865 1866–1870 1871–1875 1876–1881 1882–1887; Grant County
George W. Ryland	Rep.		36th	1883–1884	1852–1855 1856–1860 1861–1865 1866–1870 1871–1875 1876–1881 1882–1887; Grant County
Edward I. Kidd	Rep.		37th	1885–1886	1852–1855 1856–1860 1861–1865 1866–1870 1871–1875 1876–1881 1882–1887; Grant County
Edward I. Kidd	Rep.		38th	1887–1888	1852–1855 1856–1860 1861–1865 1866–1870 1871–1875 1876–1881 1882–1887; Grant County
Edward I. Kidd	Rep.		39th	1889–1890	Crawford & Grant counties
Edward I. Kidd	Rep.		40th	1891–1892	Crawford & Grant counties
Charles H. Baxter	Rep.		41st	1893–1894	Crawford and Richland counties, and Northern Grant County: Town of Beetown; Town of Bloomington; Town of Boscobel; Town of Castle Rock; Town of Fennimore; Town of Hickory Grove; Town of Lancaster; Town of Little Grant; Town of Marion; Town of Muscoda; Town of Mount Hope; Town of Mount Ida; Town of Millville; Town of Patch Grove; Town of Watterstown; Town of Wingville; Town of Woodman; Town of Wyalusing
Charles H. Baxter	Rep.		42nd	1895–1896	Crawford and Richland counties, and Northern Grant County: Town of Beetown; Town of Bloomington; Town of Boscobel; Town of Castle Rock; Town of Fennimore; Town of Hickory Grove; Town of Lancaster; Town of Little Grant; Town of Marion; Town of Muscoda; Town of Mount Hope; Town of Mount Ida; Town of Millville; Town of Patch Grove; Town of Watterstown; Town of Wingville; Town of Woodman; Town of Wyalusing
Charles H. Baxter	Rep.		43rd	1897–1898	Grant and Iowa counties
Charles H. Baxter	Rep.		44th	1899–1900	Grant and Iowa counties
Edward E. Burns	Rep.		45th	1901–1902	Grant and Iowa counties
Edward E. Burns	Rep.		46th	1903–1904	Crawford and Grant counties
Edward E. Burns	Rep.		47th	1905–1906	Crawford and Grant counties
Edward E. Burns	Rep.		48th	1907–1908	Crawford and Grant counties
John J. Blaine	Rep.		49th	1909–1910	Crawford and Grant counties
John J. Blaine	Rep.		50th	1911–1912	Crawford and Grant counties
Robert Glenn	Rep.	Elected 1912. Died 1915.	51st	1913–1914	Crawford, Grant, and Richland counties
Robert Glenn	Rep.	Elected 1912. Died 1915.	52nd	1915–1916	Crawford, Grant, and Richland counties
--Vacant--			52nd	1915–1916	Crawford, Grant, and Richland counties
Henry Edgar Roethe	Rep.		53rd	1917–1918	Crawford, Grant, and Richland counties
Henry Edgar Roethe	Rep.		54th	1919–1920	Crawford, Grant, and Richland counties
Henry Edgar Roethe	Rep.		55th	1921–1922	Crawford, Grant, and Richland counties
Henry Edgar Roethe	Rep.		56th	1923–1924	Crawford, Grant, and Vernon counties
Edward J. Roethe	Rep.		57th	1925–1926	Crawford, Grant, and Vernon counties
Edward J. Roethe	Rep.		58th	1927–1928	Crawford, Grant, and Vernon counties
Edward J. Roethe	Rep.		59th	1929–1930	Crawford, Grant, and Vernon counties
Edward J. Roethe	Rep.		60th	1931–1932	Crawford, Grant, and Vernon counties
William D. Carroll	Dem.		61st	1933–1934	Crawford, Grant, and Vernon counties
William D. Carroll	Dem.		62nd	1935–1936	Crawford, Grant, and Vernon counties
Edward J. Roethe	Rep.		63rd	1937–1938	Crawford, Grant, and Vernon counties
Edward J. Roethe	Rep.		64th	1939–1940	Crawford, Grant, and Vernon counties
Helmar Lewis	Rep.		65th	1941–1942	Crawford, Grant, and Vernon counties
Helmar Lewis	Rep.		66th	1943–1944	Crawford, Grant, and Vernon counties
Foster B. Porter	Rep.		67th	1945–1946	Crawford, Grant, and Vernon counties
Foster B. Porter	Rep.		68th	1947–1948	Crawford, Grant, and Vernon counties
Foster B. Porter	Rep.		69th	1949–1950	Crawford, Grant, and Vernon counties
Foster B. Porter	Rep.		70th	1951–1952	Crawford, Grant, and Vernon counties
Foster B. Porter	Rep.		71st	1953–1954	Crawford, Grant, and Vernon counties
Foster B. Porter	Rep.		72nd	1955–1956	Crawford, Grant, and Vernon counties
Gaylord Nelson	Dem.	Redistricted from 26th district.	73rd	1957–1958	Most of Dane County
Carl W. Thompson	Dem.		74th	1959–1960	Most of Dane County
Carl W. Thompson	Dem.		75th	1961–1962	Most of Dane County
Carl W. Thompson	Dem.		76th	1963–1964	Most of Dane County
Carl W. Thompson	Dem.		77th	1965–1966	Most of Dane County
Carl W. Thompson	Dem.		78th	1967–1968	Most of Dane County
Carl W. Thompson	Dem.		79th	1969–1970	Most of Dane County
Carl W. Thompson	Dem.		80th	1971–1972	Most of Dane County
Carl W. Thompson	Dem.		81st	1973–1974	Parts of Dane County: Town of Bristol; Town of Dunkirk; Town of Rutland; Town of Windsor; Town of York; and Northern Rock County: Town of Union
Carl W. Thompson	Dem.		82nd	1975–1976	Parts of Dane County: Town of Bristol; Town of Dunkirk; Town of Rutland; Town of Windsor; Town of York; and Northern Rock County: Town of Union
Carl W. Thompson	Dem.		83rd	1977–1978	Parts of Dane County: Town of Bristol; Town of Dunkirk; Town of Rutland; Town of Windsor; Town of York; and Northern Rock County: Town of Union
Carl W. Thompson	Dem.		84th	1979–1980	Parts of Dane County: Town of Bristol; Town of Dunkirk; Town of Rutland; Town of Windsor; Town of York; and Northern Rock County: Town of Union
Carl W. Thompson	Dem.		85th	1981–1982	Parts of Dane County: Town of Bristol; Town of Dunkirk; Town of Rutland; Town of Windsor; Town of York; and Northern Rock County: Town of Union
Carl W. Thompson	Dem.		86th	1983–1984	Parts of Dane County: Town of Bristol; Town of Dunkirk; Town of Rutland; Town of Windsor; Town of York; Part of Rock County: Town of Union; City of Evansville; Northern Green County: Town of Brooklyn; Town of Exeter; Town of New Glarus; Town of York; Village of New Glarus
Charles Chvala	Dem.		87th	1985–1986	Eastern Dane County: Town of Bristol; Town of Dunkirk; Town of Rutland; Town of Windsor; Part of Jefferson County: Town of Sumner; Northwest Rock County: Town of Fulton; Town of Milton; City of Milton; Most of Green County: Town of Albany; Town of Decatur; Town of Spring Grove; City of Monroe
Charles Chvala	Dem.		88th	1987–1988	Eastern Dane County: Town of Bristol; Town of Dunkirk; Town of Rutland; Town of Windsor; Part of Jefferson County: Town of Sumner; Northwest Rock County: Town of Fulton; Town of Milton; City of Milton; Most of Green County: Town of Albany; Town of Decatur; Town of Spring Grove; City of Monroe
Charles Chvala	Dem.		89th	1989–1990	Eastern Dane County: Town of Bristol; Town of Dunkirk; Town of Rutland; Town of Windsor; Part of Jefferson County: Town of Sumner; Northwest Rock County: Town of Fulton; Town of Milton; City of Milton; Most of Green County: Town of Albany; Town of Decatur; Town of Spring Grove; City of Monroe
Charles Chvala	Dem.		90th	1991–1992	Eastern Dane County: Town of Bristol; Town of Dunkirk; Town of Rutland; Town of Windsor; Part of Jefferson County: Town of Sumner; Northwest Rock County: Town of Fulton; Town of Milton; City of Milton; Most of Green County: Town of Albany; Town of Decatur; Town of Spring Grove; City of Monroe
Charles Chvala	Dem.		91st	1993–1994	Part of Dane County; Southern Columbia County Part of Rock County: City of Edgerton; Ward 3, Town of Fulton
Charles Chvala	Dem.		92nd	1995–1996	Part of Dane County; Southern Columbia County Part of Rock County: City of Edgerton; Ward 3, Town of Fulton
Charles Chvala	Dem.		93rd	1997–1998	Part of Dane County; Southern Columbia County Part of Rock County: City of Edgerton; Ward 3, Town of Fulton
Charles Chvala	Dem.		94th	1999–2000	Part of Dane County; Southern Columbia County Part of Rock County: City of Edgerton; Ward 3, Town of Fulton
Charles Chvala	Dem.		95th	2001–2002	Part of Dane County; Southern Columbia County Part of Rock County: City of Edgerton; Ward 3, Town of Fulton
Charles Chvala	Dem.		96th	2003–2004	Part of Dane County; Southern Columbia County Part of Sauk County: City of Merrimac; Village of Merrimac
Mark F. Miller	Dem.		97th	2005–2006	Part of Dane County; Southern Columbia County Part of Sauk County: City of Merrimac; Village of Merrimac
Mark F. Miller	Dem.		98th	2007–2008	Part of Dane County; Southern Columbia County Part of Sauk County: City of Merrimac; Village of Merrimac
Mark F. Miller	Dem.		99th	2009–2010	Part of Dane County; Southern Columbia County Part of Sauk County: City of Merrimac; Village of Merrimac
Mark F. Miller	Dem.		100th	2011–2012	Part of Dane County; Southern Columbia County Part of Sauk County: City of Merrimac; Village of Merrimac
Mark F. Miller	Dem.		101st	2013–2014	Central Dane County: Town of Dunn; Town of Madison; Town of Pleasant Springs; Town of Sun Prairie; Village of Cottage Grove; Village of McFarland; City of Sun Prairie; Part of City of Madison; Part of City of Fitchburg
Mark F. Miller	Dem.		102nd	2015–2016	Central Dane County: Town of Dunn; Town of Madison; Town of Pleasant Springs; Town of Sun Prairie; Village of Cottage Grove; Village of McFarland; City of Sun Prairie; Part of City of Madison; Part of City of Fitchburg
Mark F. Miller	Dem.		103rd	2017–2018	Central Dane County: Town of Dunn; Town of Madison; Town of Pleasant Springs; Town of Sun Prairie; Village of Cottage Grove; Village of McFarland; City of Sun Prairie; Part of City of Madison; Part of City of Fitchburg
Mark F. Miller	Dem.		104th	2019–2020	Central Dane County: Town of Dunn; Town of Madison; Town of Pleasant Springs; Town of Sun Prairie; Village of Cottage Grove; Village of McFarland; City of Sun Prairie; Part of City of Madison; Part of City of Fitchburg
Melissa Agard	Dem.		105th	2021–2022	Central Dane County: Town of Dunn; Town of Madison; Town of Pleasant Springs; Town of Sun Prairie; Village of Cottage Grove; Village of McFarland; City of Sun Prairie; Part of City of Madison; Part of City of Fitchburg
Melissa Agard	Dem.		106th	2023–2024	Central Dane County
Melissa Ratcliff	Dem.		107th	2025–2026	Eastern Dane County; Western Jefferson County part of southwest Dodge County
