= Senator Roethe =

Senator Roethe may refer to:

- Edward J. Roethe (1878–1952), Wisconsin State Senate
- Henry Edgar Roethe (1866–1939), Wisconsin State Senate
