= Andrew Hysell =

21st century American politician

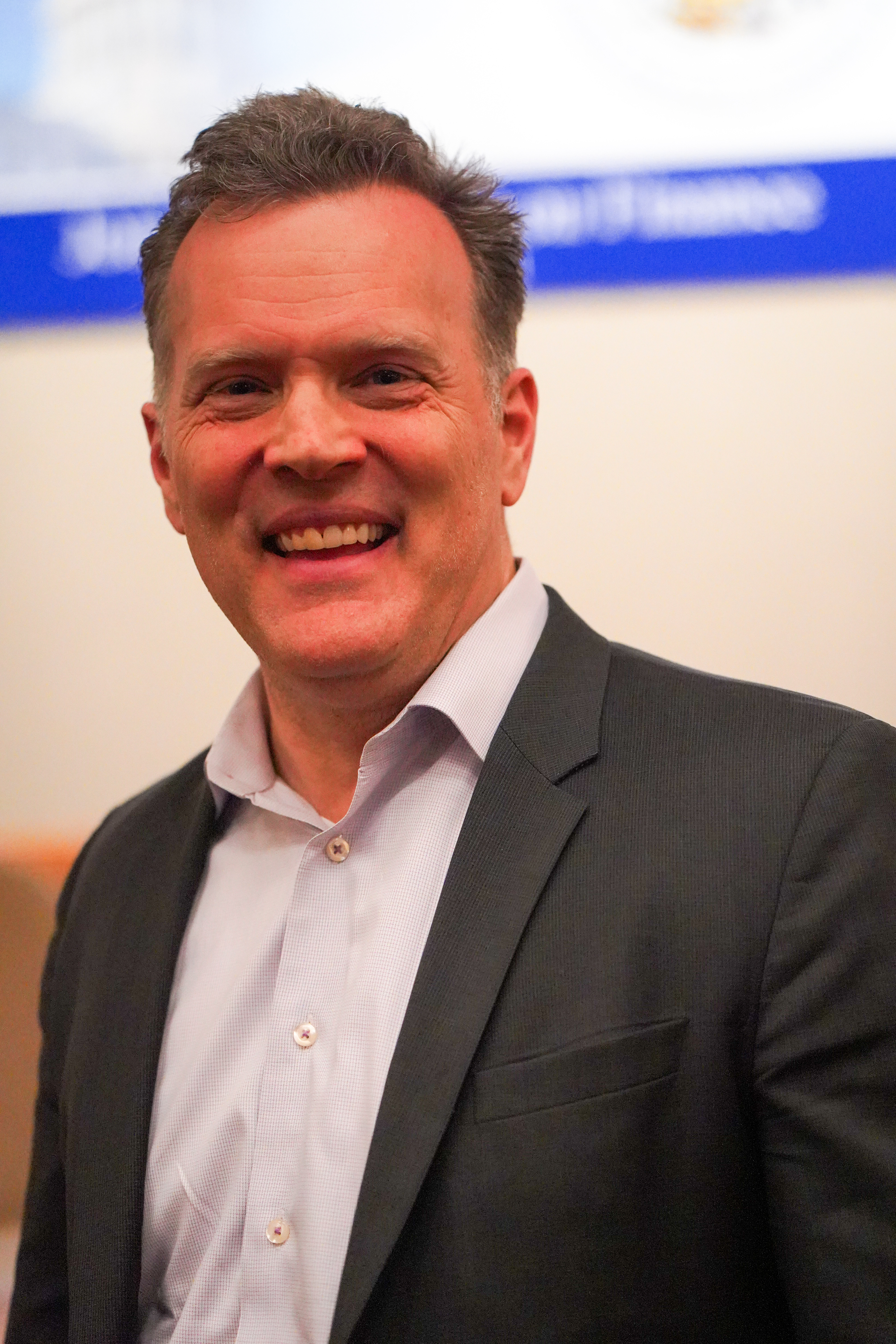
- Hysell in 2026

Member of the Wisconsin State Assembly from the 48th district
- Incumbent
- Assumed office January 6, 2025
- Preceded by: Samba Baldeh

Personal details
- Born: August 1971 (age 54) Ridgewood, New Jersey, U.S.
- Party: Democratic
- Education: Carroll University (B.S.); Georgetown University Law Center (J.D.)
- Profession: Lawyer
- Website: Campaign website

Andrew Jeremy Hysell (born August 1971) is an American lawyer, public policy consultant, and Democratic politician from Sun Prairie, Wisconsin. He is a member of the Wisconsin State Assembly, representing Wisconsin's 48th Assembly district since 2025.

== Early life and education ==
Andrew Hysell was born in Ridgewood, New Jersey, and moved several times during childhood. He graduated from Pius XI High School in Milwaukee, Wisconsin, and attended Carroll University in nearby Waukesha, Wisconsin, earning his bachelor's degree in 1993.

== Political career ==
After graduating, he went to work in Democratic Party politics. In 1996, he worked as a fundraiser for the congressional campaign of Maine Democrat Tom Allen. After Allen won his election, he hired Hysell as a legislative assistant in his Washington, D.C., office. Hysell remained on staff for a little over a year, before returning to campaigning in 1998. That year he worked in the state of Washington to oppose a Republican referendum seeking to bypass the Democratic governor's veto to slash highway taxes and replace the money by issuing new debt.

After the 1998 election, Hysell returned to Washington, D.C., working as regional director for the Campaign for Tobacco-Free Kids. While working in this role, he attended night courses at Georgetown University Law Center, earning his J.D. in 2003. He returned to electoral politics in 2004, working as campaign manager for New York firefighter Kevin McAdams in an unsuccessful primary challenge against U.S. representative Eliot Engel. After McAdams' defeat, Hysell was hired as legislative counsel to the Connecticut State Senate Democrats, where he worked for the next two years.

=== Kansas Reading Roadmap controversy ===
He returned to issue advocacy in 2006, working as director of state policy and advocacy for Save the Children, and remained at that organization until 2013. That year, he founded a management consulting firm, Hysell & Wagner LLC. The firm received a $2.3 million grant to administer the Kansas Reading Roadmap program on behalf of the Kansas Department for Children and Families. The grant was awarded under Republican governor Sam Brownback in 2013, using federal funding from Temporary Assistance for Needy Families. When Democratic governor Laura Kelly took office in 2019, her team began examining existing grants and contracts and terminated Hysell & Wagner's agreement. At the time, the company was accused of mismanagement of the funding, but the state ultimately settled with Hysell & Wagner in 2020, paying them an additional $100,000 in exchange for Hysell's agreement not to pursue litigation for defamation.

While vindicated, his firm ceased operations, and Hysell moved the Madison, Wisconsin, area. He took a job with CTA Strategies, LLC, a public policy consulting firm. Two years later, he also joined the Madison law firm Lawton & Cates.

=== Wisconsin Assembly ===
In 2022, Hysell made his first bid for elected office, running for Wisconsin State Assembly in what was then the 46th Assembly district, where incumbent Democrat Gary Hebl was retiring. The district was safely Democratic, and saw four other strong candidates jump into the Democratic Party primary, including Dane County supervisors Melissa Ratcliff and Analiese Eicher, Sun Prairie city councilmember Mike Jacobs, and Madison city councilmember Syed Abbas. The primary was hotly contested and became the most expensive Democratic primary in the Assembly that year, with spending exceeding $157,000 from the five candidates. During the campaign, Hysell was attacked for making campaign contributions to Republican lawmakers, including Wisconsin state senator Mary Felzkowski. Ratcliff won the primary with 36% of the vote and went on to serve in the Assembly; Hysell finished in 3rd with 17.7%.

In 2023, the Wisconsin Supreme Court struck down Wisconsin's existing legislative maps and ordered new maps drawn. The 2024 redistricting significantly affected the area around Sun Prairie, where Hysell resided. While previously packed into the 46th district with eastern Madison and the neighboring Cottage Grove, under the 2024 plan, Sun Prairie moved into the 48th district, which stretched through more rural areas of northeast Dane County into southwest Dodge County. 48th district incumbent Samba Baldeh chose to forgo re-election to instead run for Wisconsin Senate, leaving the 48th an open seat. The district was still overwhelmingly Democratic, so attracted a large primary field again. Hysell's career history again came under intense scrutiny from a coordinated move by his four rivals, although this time he also had the endorsement of prominent Madison area Democratic state senators Melissa Agard and Kelda Roys. Hysell won the primary with 32% of the vote, finishing 618 votes ahead of former Sun Prairie city council president Bill Connors. Hysell easily prevailed in the general election, receiving 67% of the vote. He took office in January 2025.

== Personal life and family ==
Andrew Hysell is a son of Niles Andrew Hysell Jr. and Elaine (née Hanson) Hysell. His parents are divorced.

Hysell is not married and resides in Sun Prairie, Wisconsin.

== Electoral history ==
=== Wisconsin Assembly, 46th district (2022) ===
Year	Election	Date	Elected				Defeated				Total	Plurality
2022	Primary	Aug. 9	Melissa Ratcliff	Democratic	3,112	36.22%	Syed Abbas	Dem.	1,895	22.05%	8,593	1,217
2022	Primary	Aug. 9	Melissa Ratcliff	Democratic	3,112	36.22%	Andrew Hysell	Dem.	1,525	17.75%	8,593	1,217
2022	Primary	Aug. 9	Melissa Ratcliff	Democratic	3,112	36.22%	Analiese Eicher	Dem.	1,178	13.71%	8,593	1,217
2022	Primary	Aug. 9	Melissa Ratcliff	Democratic	3,112	36.22%	Mike Jacobs	Dem.	876	10.19%	8,593	1,217

=== Wisconsin Assembly, 48th district (2024) ===
Year	Election	Date	Elected				Defeated				Total	Plurality
2024	Primary	Aug. 13	Andrew Hysell	Democratic	3,423	32.07%	Bill Connors	Dem.	2,805	26.28%	10,675	618
2024	Primary	Aug. 13	Andrew Hysell	Democratic	3,423	32.07%	Avery K. Renk	Dem.	2,296	21.51%	10,675	618
2024	Primary	Aug. 13	Andrew Hysell	Democratic	3,423	32.07%	Goodwill Chekwube Obieze	Dem.	1,544	14.46%	10,675	618
2024	Primary	Aug. 13	Andrew Hysell	Democratic	3,423	32.07%	Rick E. Rose	Dem.	591	5.54%	10,675	618
2024	General	Nov. 5	Andrew Hysell	Democratic	23,816	67.32%	Lisa Rubrich	Rep.	11,509	32.53%	35,379	12,307

Wisconsin State Assembly
Preceded by Samba Baldeh	Member of the Wisconsin State Assembly from the 48th district January 6, 2025 – present	Incumbent
