= Wisconsin's 46th Assembly district =

American legislative district in southern Wisconsin

Wisconsin's 46th State Assembly district
- 2024 map defined in 2023 Wisc. Act 94; 2022 map defined in Johnson v. Wisconsin Elections Commission; 2011 map was defined in 2011 Wisc. Act 43
Assemblymember
Joan Fitzgerald; D–Fort Atkinson
since January 6, 2025 (1 years)
- Demographics: 89.74% White; 1.59% Black; 5.39% Hispanic; 1.37% Asian; 1.44% Native American; 0.09% Hawaiian/Pacific Islander
- Population (2020) • Voting age: 59,231; 45,680
- Website: Official website
- Notes: Southern Wisconsin

The 46th Assembly district of Wisconsin is one of 99 districts in the Wisconsin State Assembly. Located in southern Wisconsin, the district comprises most of the west half of Jefferson County and parts of eastern Dane County. It includes the cities of Fort Atkinson, Lake Mills, and Waterloo, and the villages of Cambridge, Deerfield, and Rockdale, along with nearly all of the village of Cottage Grove and part of the village of McFarland. The district also contains Aztalan State Park and the Goose Lake Wildlife Area. The district is represented by Democrat Joan Fitzgerald, since January 2025.

The 46th Assembly district is located within Wisconsin's 16th Senate district, along with the 47th and 48th Assembly districts.

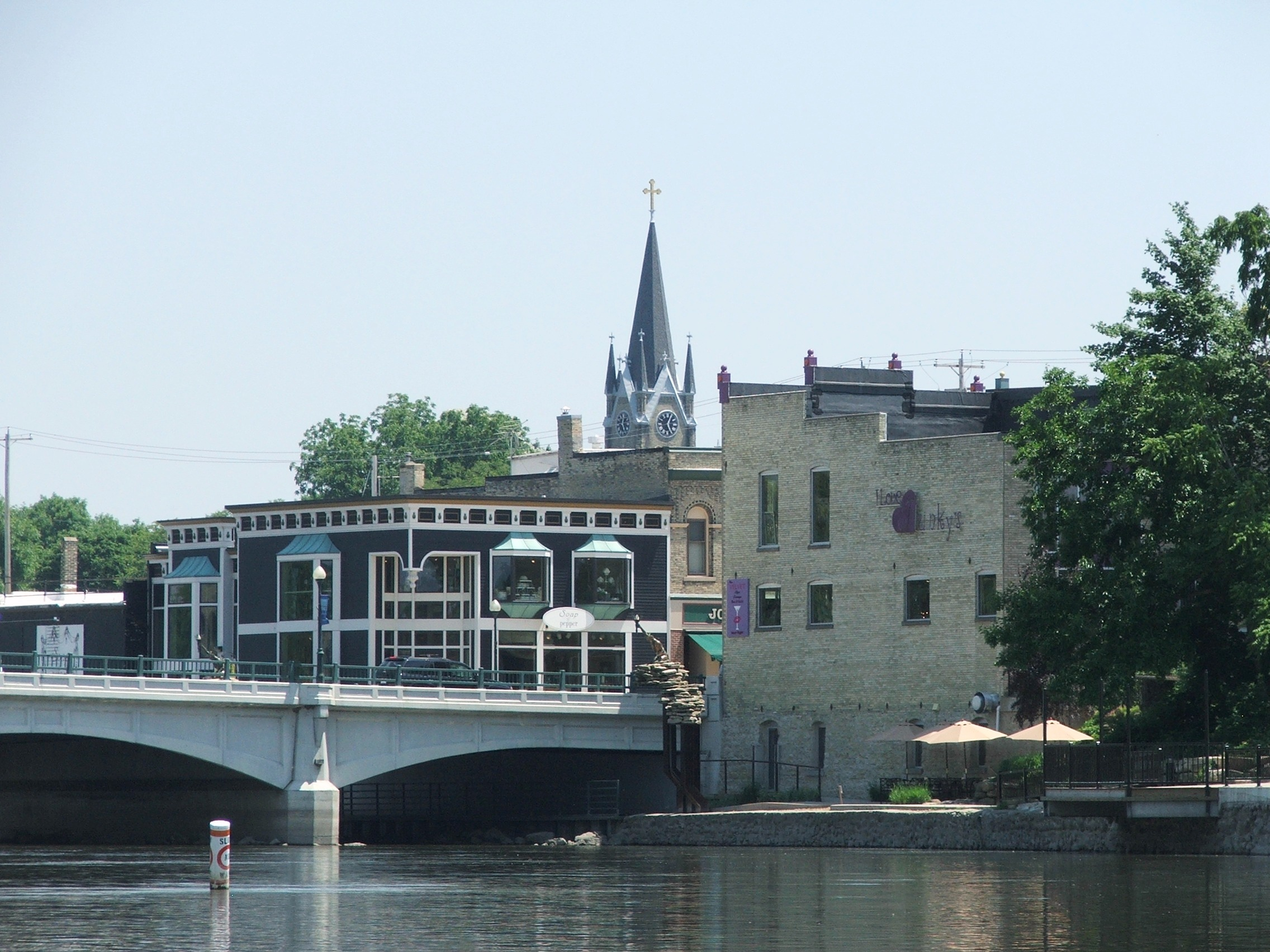
Downtown Fort Atkinson

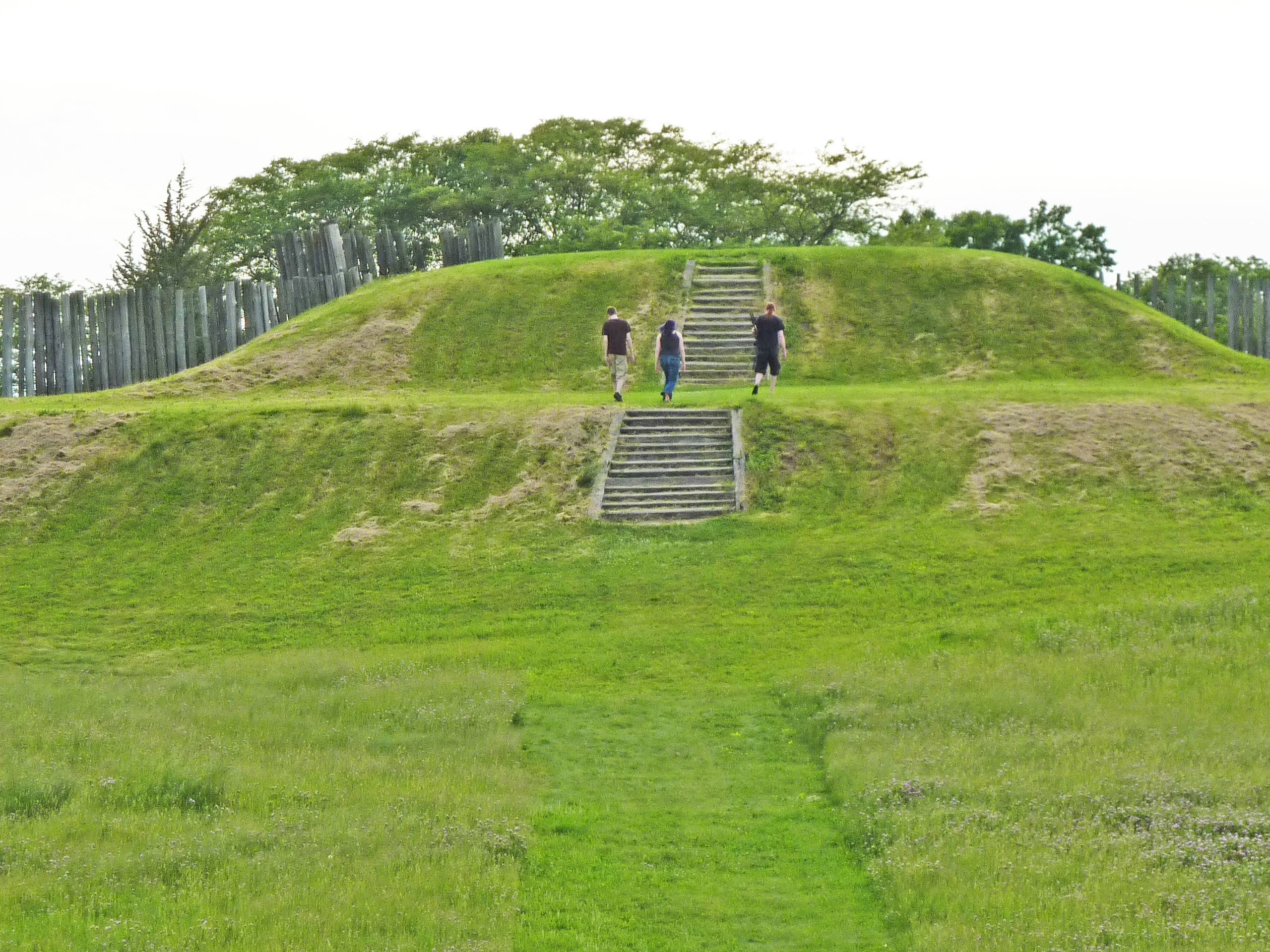
Aztalan State Park

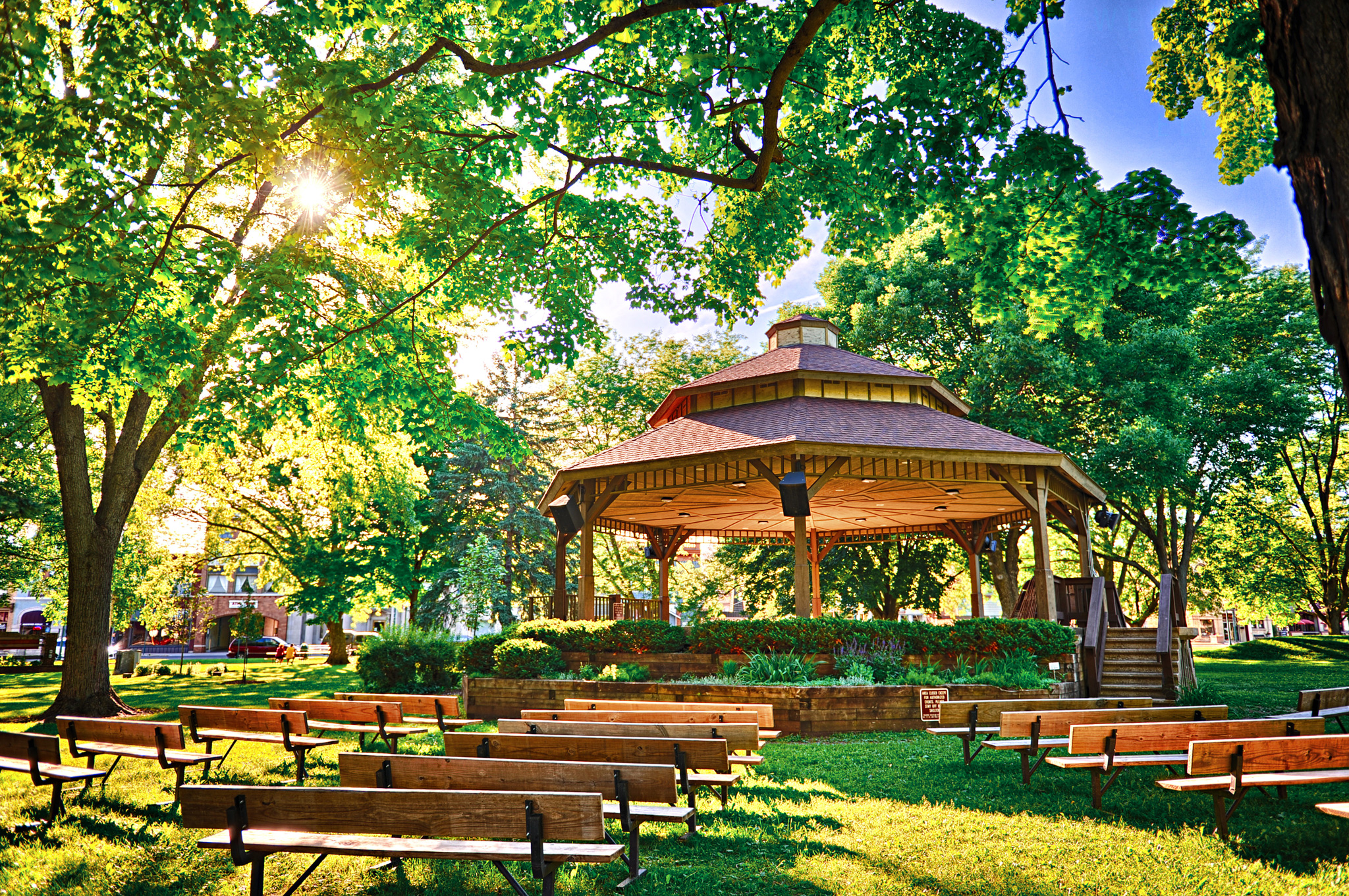
Commons Park, downtown Lake Mills

== List of past representatives ==
List of representatives to the Wisconsin State Assembly from the 46th district
Member	Party	Residence	Counties represented	Term start	Term end	Ref.
District created
David D. O'Malley	Dem.	Waunakee	Dane	January 1, 1973	January 3, 1977	
Thomas A. Loftus	Dem.	Sun Prairie	Dane	January 3, 1977	January 3, 1983	
Jim Holperin	Dem.	Eagle River	Oneida, Vilas	January 3, 1983	January 7, 1985	
Thomas A. Loftus	Dem.	Sun Prairie	Dane	January 7, 1985	January 7, 1991	
Rudy Silbaugh	Rep.	Stoughton	Dane, Rock	January 7, 1991	January 6, 1997	
Tom Hebl	Dem.	Sun Prairie	Dane	January 6, 1997	January 3, 2005	
Gary Hebl	Dem.	Sun Prairie	Dane	January 3, 2005	January 3, 2023	
Melissa Ratcliff	Dem.	Cottage Grove	Dane	January 3, 2023	January 6, 2025	
Joan Fitzgerald	Dem.	Fort Atkinson	Dane, Jefferson	January 6, 2025	Current	

== Electoral history ==
Year	Date	Elected				Defeated				Total	Plurality	Other primary candidates
2022	Nov. 3	Melissa Ratcliff	Democratic	20,710	69.65%	Andrew McKinney	Rep.	9,001	30.27%	29,735	11,709	Syed Abbas (Dem.); Andrew Hysell (Dem.); Analiese Eicher (Dem.); Mike Jacobs (Dem.)
2024	Nov. 5	Joan Fitzgerald	Democratic	18,985	52.39%	Jenifer Quimby	Rep.	17,219	47.52%	36,236	1,766	
