= Joan Fitzgerald =

Joan Fitzgerald (or FitzGerald) may refer to:

- Joan FitzGerald, Countess of Carrick (1282–1320), daughter of John FitzThomas FitzGerald, 1st Earl of Kildare
- Joan Fitzgerald, Countess of Ormond (died 1565), daughter of James Fitzgerald, 10th Earl of Desmond
- Joan Fitzgerald (politician) (born c.1965), Wisconsin state legislator
- Joan Fitz-Gerald (born 1948), former president of the Colorado Senate
