= 2021 Dane County Executive election =

- April 6, 2021
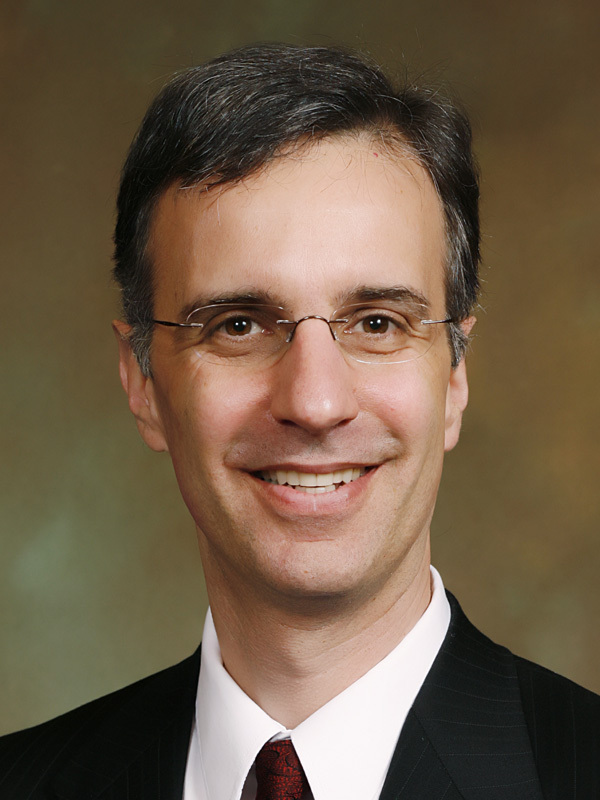

Nominee	Joe Parisi	Mary Ann Nicholson
Party	Nonpartisan	Nonpartisan
Popular vote	90,472	23,978
Percentage	78.91%	20.91%
County Executive before election
Joe Parisi
Nonpartisan
Elected County Executive
Joe Parisi
Nonpartisan

The 2021 Dane County Executive election took place on April 6, 2021. Incumbent County Executive Joe Parisi ran for re-election to a fourth term. His only challenger in the race was Mary Ann Nicholson, a controller for a local construction company. During the election, Nicholson paused her campaign and ceased active campaigning following the death of her husband, but continued in the race.

Parisi ended up winning re-election in a landslide, winning 79 percent of the vote to Nicholson's 21 percent.

However, Parisi did not end up serving out his full term. He announced that he would step down as County Executive in May 2024, which allowed a special election to take place to determine his successor.

== General election ==
=== Candidates ===
- Joe Parisi, incumbent County Executive
- Mary Ann Nicholson, construction company controller

=== Results ===
2021 Dane County Executive election
Party	Candidate	Votes	%
Nonpartisan	Joe Parisi (inc.)	90,472	78.91%
Nonpartisan	Mary Ann Nicholson	23,978	20.91%
Write-in		209	0.18%
Total votes		114,659	100.00%
