= 2024 Dane County Executive special election =

- November 5, 2024

Nominee	Melissa Agard	Dana Pellebon
Party	Nonpartisan	Nonpartisan
Popular vote	168,168	104,487
Percentage	60.91%	37.84%
County Executive before election
Jamie Kuhn (interim)
Nonpartisan
Elected County Executive
Melissa Agard
Nonpartisan

The 2024 Dane County Executive special election took place on November 5, 2024, following a primary election on August 13, 2024. County Executive Joe Parisi, who won re-election to a four year term in 2021, announced that he would resign from office. Following Parisi's resignation, former County Supervisor Jamie Kuhn was appointed as interim County Executive, and served until the special election.

Former State Senator Melissa Agard emerged as the frontrunner, and won 57 percent of the vote in the primary election. County Supervisor Dana Pellebon defeated Madison City Alder Regina Vidaver for second place, winning 17 percent of the vote to Vidaver's 15 percent, and advanced to the general election against Agard. In the general election, Agard defeated Pellebon in a landslide, winning 61 percent of the vote to Pellebon's 38 percent.

== Primary election ==
=== Candidates ===
- Melissa Agard, former State Senator
- Dana Pellebon, County Supervisor
- Regina Vidaver, Madison City Alder
- Wes Sparkman, Director of the County Office for Equity and Inclusion

=== Results ===
Primary election results
Party	Candidate	Votes	%
Nonpartisan	Melissa Agard	61,286	56.95%
Nonpartisan	Dana Pellebon	18,561	17.25%
Nonpartisan	Regina Vidaver	16,269	15.12%
Nonpartisan	Wes Sparkman	10,791	10.03%
Write-in		705	0.66%
Total votes		107,612	100.00%

== General election ==
=== Results ===
2024 Dane County Executive special election
Party	Candidate	Votes	%
Nonpartisan	Melissa Agard	168,168	60.91%
Nonpartisan	Dana Pellebon	104,487	37.84%
Write-in		3,457	1.25%
Total votes		276,112	100.00%
