= Wisconsin's 48th Assembly district =

American legislative district in south-central Wisconsin

Wisconsin's 48th State Assembly district
- 2024 map defined in 2023 Wisc. Act 94; 2022 map defined in Johnson v. Wisconsin Elections Commission; 2011 map was defined in 2011 Wisc. Act 43
Assemblymember
Andrew Hysell; D–Sun Prairie
since January 6, 2025 (1 years)
- Demographics: 89.74% White; 1.59% Black; 5.39% Hispanic; 1.37% Asian; 1.44% Native American; 0.09% Hawaiian/Pacific Islander
- Population (2020) • Voting age: 59,231; 45,680
- Website: Official website
- Notes: Madison metro area (northeast)

The 48th Assembly district of Wisconsin is one of 99 districts in the Wisconsin State Assembly. Located in south-central Wisconsin, the district comprises northeastern suburban and exurban areas of the Madison area within northeast Dane County and the towns of Elba and Portland in southwest Dodge County. It includes the city of Sun Prairie, and parts of the city of Madison including the Ridgewood, Mayfair Park, Burke Heights and High Crossing neighborhoods. The district also contains East Towne Mall. The seat is represented by Democrat Andrew Hysell since January 2025.

The 48th Assembly district is located within Wisconsin's 16th Senate district, along with the 46th and 47th Assembly districts.

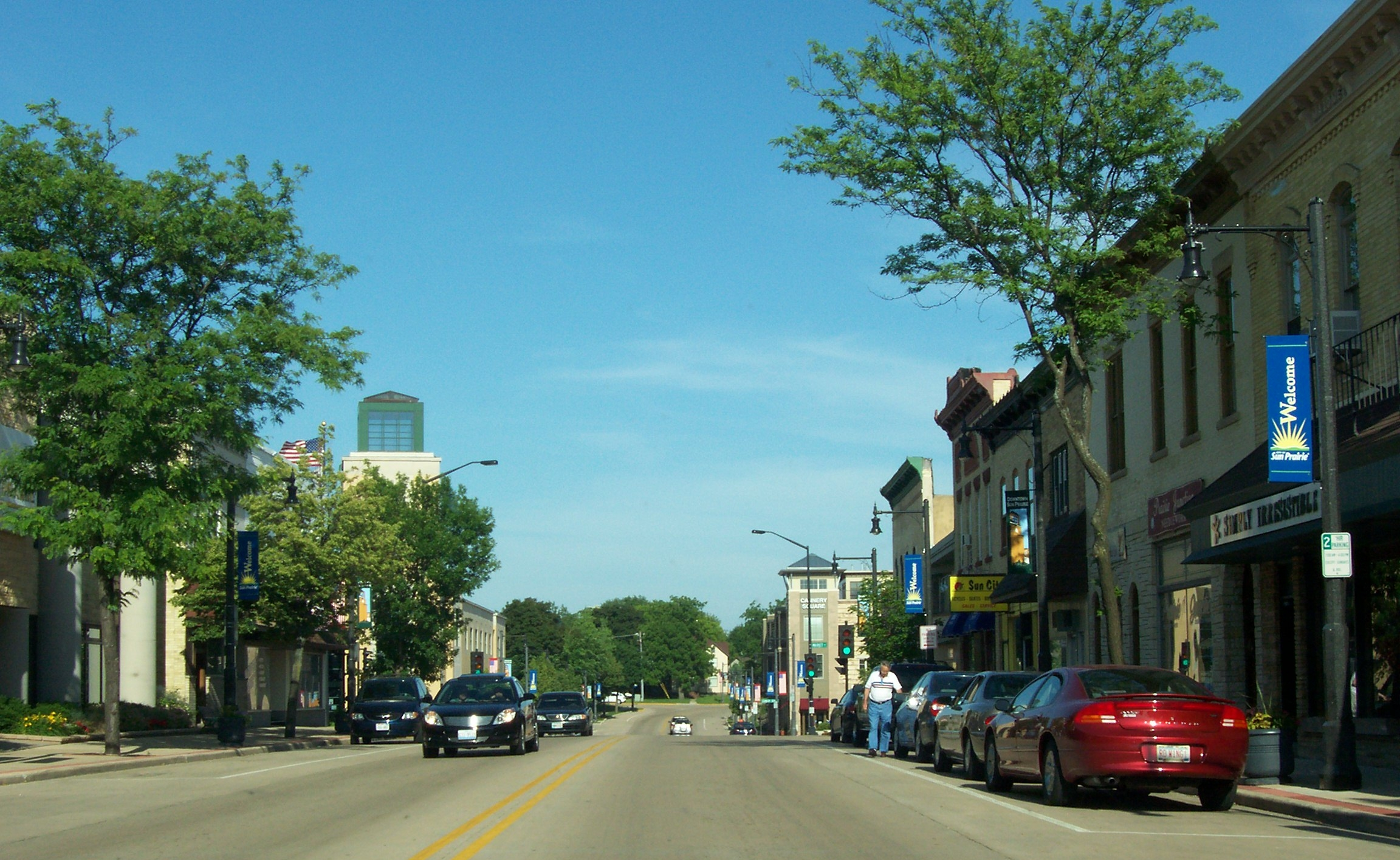
Downtown Sun Prairie

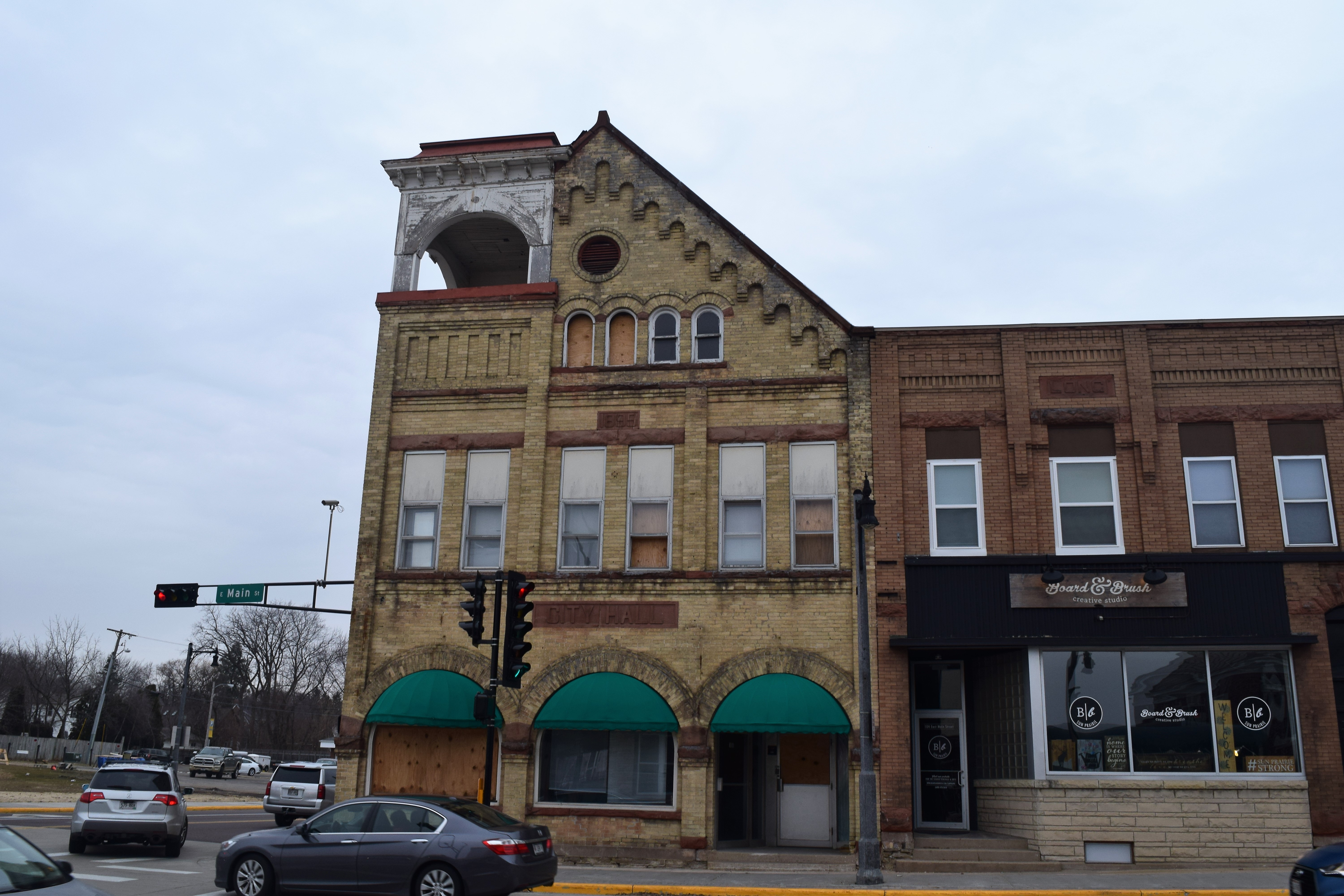
Sun Prairie Downtown Historic District

== List of past representatives ==
List of representatives to the Wisconsin State Assembly from the 48th district
Member	Party	Residence	Counties represented	Term start	Term end	Ref.
District created
Lewis T. Mittness	Dem.	Milton	Rock	January 1, 1973	December 11, 1975	
--Vacant--			Rock	December 11, 1975	April 16, 1976	
Wayne W. Wood	Dem.	Janesville	Rock	April 16, 1976	January 3, 1983	
Lloyd H. Kincaid	Dem.	Crandon	Florence, Forest, Langlade, Marathon, Marinette, Menominee, Oconto, Shawano	January 3, 1983	April 13, 1983	
--Vacant--			Florence, Forest, Langlade, Marathon, Marinette, Menominee, Oconto, Shawano	April 13, 1983	July 12, 1983	
John Volk	Dem.	Freedom	Florence, Forest, Langlade, Marathon, Marinette, Menominee, Oconto, Shawano	July 12, 1983	January 7, 1985	
Sue Rohan	Dem.	Monona	Dane	January 7, 1985	June 1, 1992	
--Vacant--			Dane	June 1, 1992	January 4, 1993	
Doris Hanson	Dem.	Monona	Dane	January 4, 1993	January 4, 1999	
Mark F. Miller	Dem.	Monona	Dane	January 4, 1999	January 3, 2005	
Joe Parisi	Dem.	Madison	Dane	January 3, 2005	April 14, 2011	
--Vacant--			Dane	April 14, 2011	August 9, 2011	
Chris Taylor	Dem.	Madison	Dane	August 9, 2011	January 7, 2013	
Melissa Agard	Dem.	Madison	Dane	January 7, 2013	January 4, 2021	
Samba Baldeh	Dem.	Madison	Dane	January 4, 2021	January 6, 2025	
Andrew Hysell	Dem.	Sun Prairie	Dane, Dodge	January 6, 2025	Current	
