= Melissa Ratcliff =

21st century American politician (born 1976)

Member of the Wisconsin Senate from the 16th district
- Incumbent
- Assumed office January 6, 2025
- Preceded by: Melissa Agard

Member of the Wisconsin State Assembly from the 46th district
- In office January 3, 2023 – January 6, 2025
- Preceded by: Gary Hebl
- Succeeded by: Joan Fitzgerald

Member of the Board of Supervisors of Dane County, Wisconsin, from the 36th district
- In office September 6, 2018 – April 16, 2024
- Preceded by: Danielle Williams
- Succeeded by: David Peterson

Personal details
- Born: Melissa Amy Larsen; November 1976 (age 49) Green Bay, Wisconsin, U.S.
- Party: Democratic
- Spouses: Daniel Kartes (m. 1995; div. 1998); Philip Ratcliff (m. 2002; div. 2023)
- Children: 2
- Education: Madison Area Technical College
- Occupation: Paralegal
- Website: Official website; Campaign website

Melissa Amy Ratcliff (née Larsen; born November 1976) is an American Democratic politician from Cottage Grove, Wisconsin. She is a member of the Wisconsin Senate, representing Wisconsin's 16th Senate district since 2025. She previously served in the Wisconsin State Assembly, representing the 46th Assembly district during the 2023–2024 term. Before being elected to the Legislature, she served six years as a member of the Dane County Board of Supervisors and four years on the Cottage Grove village board.

== Biography ==
Melissa Ratcliff was born Melissa Larsen in Green Bay, Wisconsin and was raised in Wausau, Wisconsin. She graduated from Wausau East High School in 1995. She earned her paralegal certification from Madison Area Technical College and was a paralegal for 24 years at Eisenberg Law Offices in Madison, Wisconsin.

== Political career ==
In the Spring of 2018, Ratcliff won her first public office when she was elected to the Cottage Grove village board. Later that year, in the summer of 2018, incumbent Dane County board member Danielle Williams resigned her seat in order to accept a job as a lobbyist for the county government. The Dane County board chair, Sharon Corrigan, chose Ratcliff from a number of applicants to fill out the remainder of Williams' term, and Ratcliff's selection was ratified by a vote of the county board on September 6, 2018. She was subsequently elected in spring of 2019 to finish the term, elected to a full term on the board in the 2020 Spring election and was re-elected in 2022.

Just after the Spring 2022 election, incumbent state representative Gary Hebl announced he would retire after nine terms in the Assembly. Within hours of his announcement, Ratcliff entered the race for the Democratic nomination in Hebl's 46th Assembly district. Ultimately, four other candidates would also join the Democratic primary contest in the heavily Democratic district. Ratcliff centered her experience with local and county government, and ultimately prevailed in the primary with 36% of the vote. Her opponent in the general election was Andrew McKinney, whom she had earlier defeated in the April 2022 county board election. She ultimately won 70% of the vote in the general election.

In 2023, incumbent state senator Melissa Agard announced she would run for Dane County Executive rather than seeking another term representing the 16th Senate district. The 16th Senate district was one of the safest Democratic districts in the state, comprising about half of the city of Madison. The 2024 redistricting act shifted the district to a slightly more competitive configuration, shifting out of the city of Madison and into the eastern and southern suburbs, but the district remained heavily Democratic. The heavily Democratic Senate district attracted all three incumbent state representatives in the district, including Ratcliff, to forgo their Assembly re-elections to instead enter the Democratic Senate primary. All three were progressive Democrats, running on a similar policy platform of expanding Medicaid and defending abortion rights, so the race would ultimately come down to personalities and coalitions. Ratcliff prevailed, taking 52% of the vote. She was unopposed in the general election and was sworn in as state senator on January 6, 2025.

== Personal life and family ==
Melissa Larsen married Daniel Kartes in August 1995, but ultimately divorced three years later. Subsequently, she married Philip Ratcliff and took his last name. Melissa and Philip Ratcliff have two children together and reside in Cottage Grove, Wisconsin. They were divorced in June, 2023.

== Electoral history ==
=== Dane County Board (2020, 2022) ===
Dane County Board of Supervisors, 36th District Election, 2020
Party	Candidate	Votes	%	±%
General Election, April 7, 2020
Nonpartisan	Melissa Ratcliff (incumbent)	3,427	98.65%	
	Scattering	47	1.35%	
Total votes		3,474	100.0%	

Dane County Board of Supervisors, 36th District Election, 2022
Party	Candidate	Votes	%	±%
General Election, April 5, 2022
Nonpartisan	Melissa Ratcliff (incumbent)	1,132	64.69%	
Nonpartisan	Andrew McKinney	605	34.57%	
	Scattering	13	0.74%	
Total votes		1,750	100.0%	-49.63%

=== Wisconsin Assembly (2022) ===
Year	Election	Date	Elected				Defeated				Total	Plurality
2022	Primary	Sep. 8	Melissa Ratcliff	Democratic	3,112	36.22%	Syed Abbas	Dem.	1,895	22.05%	8,593	1,217
2022	Primary	Sep. 8	Melissa Ratcliff	Democratic	3,112	36.22%	Andrew Hysell	Dem.	1,525	17.75%	8,593	1,217
2022	Primary	Sep. 8	Melissa Ratcliff	Democratic	3,112	36.22%	Analiese Eicher	Dem.	1,178	13.71%	8,593	1,217
2022	Primary	Sep. 8	Melissa Ratcliff	Democratic	3,112	36.22%	Mike Jacobs	Dem.	876	10.19%	8,593	1,217
2022	General	Nov. 3	Melissa Ratcliff	Democratic	20,710	69.65%	Andrew McKinney	Rep.	9,001	30.27%	29,735	11,709

=== Wisconsin Senate (2024) ===
Year	Election	Date	Elected				Defeated				Total	Plurality
2024	Primary	Aug. 13	Melissa Ratcliff	Democratic	17,205	52.04%	Jimmy Anderson	Dem.	10,258	31.03%	33,063	6,947
2024	Primary	Aug. 13	Melissa Ratcliff	Democratic	17,205	52.04%	Samba Baldeh	Dem.	5,575	16.86%	33,063	6,947
2024	General	Nov. 5	Melissa Ratcliff	Democratic	82,828	97.23%	--Unopposed--				85,189	80,467

Wisconsin State Assembly
Preceded by Gary Hebl	Member of the Wisconsin State Assembly from the 46th district January 3, 2023 – January 6, 2025	Succeeded by Joan Fitzgerald
Wisconsin Senate
Preceded by Melissa Agard	Member of the Wisconsin Senate from the 16th district January 6, 2025 – present	Incumbent
