= Madison Area Technical College =

Public college in Madison, Wisconsin, US

Coordinates: 43°07′18.5″N 89°19′40.0″W

- Type: Public technical college
- Established: 1912
- President: Jennifer Berne
- Faculty: 1,078 (fall 2023)
- Students: 13,281 (fall 2023)
- Location: Madison, Wisconsin, United States
- Campus: Urban
- Nickname: WolfPack
- Colors: Blue and white
- Mascot: Wolfie
- Website: madisoncollege.edu

Madison Area Technical College, or simply Madison College or MATC, is a public technical college in Madison, Wisconsin, United States. It serves students in south-central Wisconsin and is part of the Wisconsin Technical College System. The college has three campuses in Madison and regional sites in Fort Atkinson, Portage, Reedsburg, and Watertown, Wisconsin. Madison College had a total enrollment of 13,281 as of fall 2023.

== History ==
The college was founded in 1912 as the Madison Continuation School, providing vocational education, citizenship, and homemaking classes. In 1921, it moved into a building next to the former Madison Central High School in downtown Madison and became known as Madison Vocational School.

In response to the Great Depression, the Madison Vocational School created non-credit, continuing education courses in artisan crafts, such as millinery, woodworking, and chair-caning. During the 1942–43 academic year, courses met on the third shift to teach skills needed for wartime manufacturing jobs. In 1950 the school purchased a Baptist church building as an addition.

Starting in 1966, the college offered college transfer and credit-bearing courses. In 1987, the primary campus shifted to a larger, east-side facility, built near the Truax Field Dane County Regional Airport. In 2004, the college opened a campus at Villager Mall on the south side of Madison.

In 2010, the college began to refer to itself as "Madison College", in part to help end confusion with Milwaukee Area Technical College, which also uses the acronym "MATC". The official name of the school remains Madison Area Technical College. A 2010 state referendum funded physical updates at regional campuses and new construction at the Truax campus.

In response to the need for accessible education facilities and community gathering spaces in Madison's most underserved part of the city, Madison College opened an expanded Goodman South Campus in fall 2019. At the same time, Madison College closed its downtown campus after 88 years.

== Academics ==
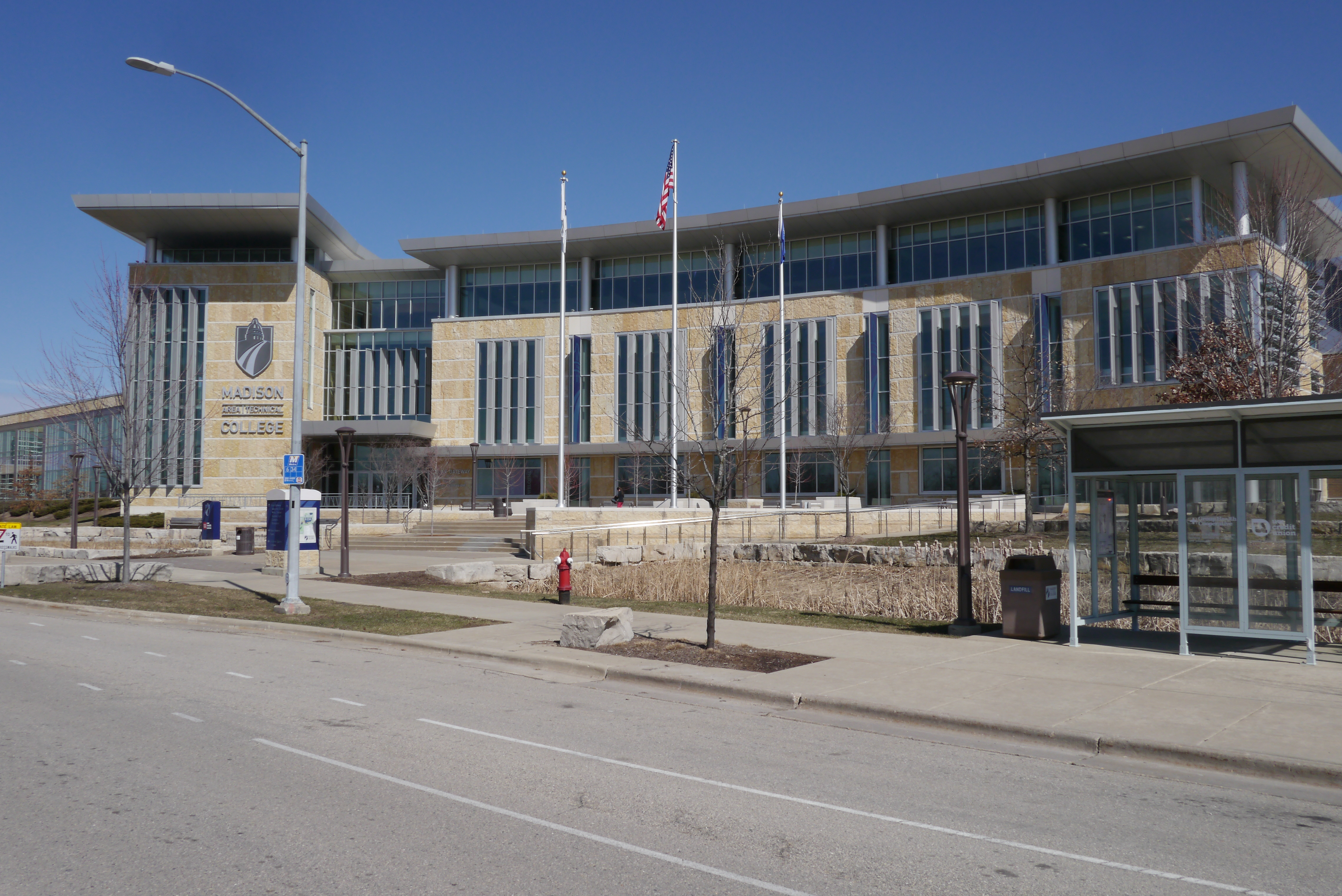
Madison College Truax campus

The school offers more than 180 associate degrees and technical diploma programs, as well as trade apprenticeships and other certifications. It serves students in parts of 12 counties in south-central Wisconsin: Adams, Columbia, Dane, Dodge, Green, Iowa, Jefferson, Juneau, Marquette, Richland, Rock, and Sauk.

Madison College offers 11 areas of study:

- Architecture & Engineering
- Arts, Design & Humanities
- Business
- Construction, Manufacturing & Maintenance
- Culinary, Hospitality & Fitness
- Education & Social Sciences
- Health Sciences
- Information Technology
- Law, Protective & Human Services
- Science, Math and Natural Resources
- Transportation

In addition to traditional, in-person, campus-based courses, the college offers degrees and courses in online and hybrid models. The Liberal Arts transfer program offers associate of arts and associate of sciences degrees that satisfy the first two years of general studies at some four-year institutions. Madison College has seven tailored liberal arts pre-majors designed for transfer. The University of Wisconsin--Madison is the school's largest transfer partner.

Adult continuing education programs offer non-credit professional and personal development classes. In 2014, Madison College began to offer digital badges for learning.

According to the college, 92% of students found a job within six months of graduation in 2019.

== Athletics ==
The Madison College Wolfpack is a member of the NJCAA Division III (North Central Community College Conference) for all sports except for Baseball & Softball (Division II).

Madison College Teams:

- Men's Baseball, Basketball, Golf, Soccer
- Women's Basketball, Soccer, Softball, Volleyball
- Co-Ed Esports

== Notable people ==
- Samba Baldeh, politician
- Mike Capaccio, athletics administrator
- Kathleen Dubberstein, curler
- Robert D. Gruss, Roman Catholic bishop
- Steve Hilgenberg, politician
- Debi Laszewski, professional female bodybuilder
- Joe Parisi, 5th Executive of Dane County, Wisconsin
- Sondy Pope, politician
- Melissa Ratcliff, politician
- Janis Ringhand, politician
- Steve Rude, comics artist
- Robert Welch, politician
