= Samba Baldeh =

21st century American politician

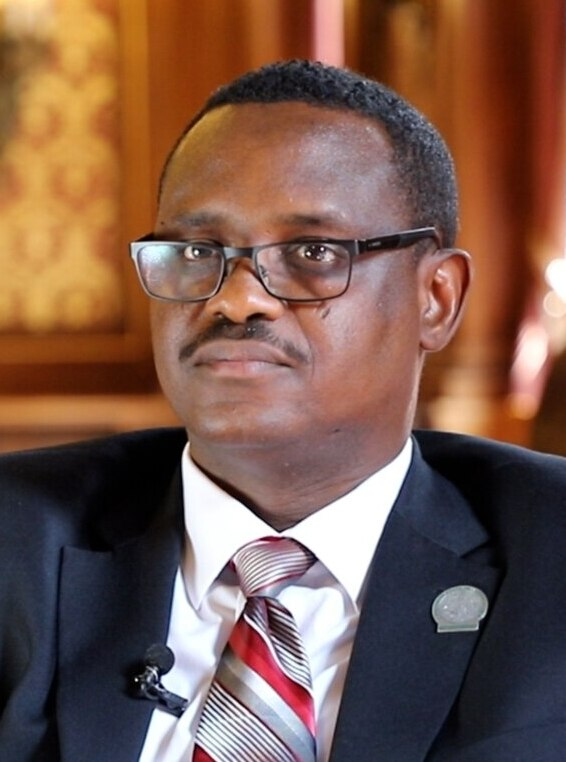

Member of the Wisconsin State Assembly from the 48th district
- In office January 4, 2021 – January 6, 2025
- Preceded by: Melissa Agard
- Succeeded by: Andrew Hysell

President of the Madison Common Council
- In office April 17, 2018 – April 16, 2019
- Preceded by: Marsha Rummel
- Succeeded by: Shiva Bidar

Member of the Madison Common Council from the 17th district
- In office April 21, 2015 – April 6, 2021
- Preceded by: Joe Clausius
- Succeeded by: Gary Halverson

Personal details
- Born: September 10, 1971 (age 54) Choya Village, The Gambia
- Party: Democratic
- Other political affiliations: Progressive Dane
- Spouse: Fatou
- Education: Madison Area Technical College (AS); University of the Gambia; University of Wisconsin, Madison
- Occupation: Politician, legislator, IT professional
- Website: Official website Campaign website

Samba Baldeh (born September 10, 1971) is a Gambian American immigrant, information technology professional, and Democratic politician from Madison, Wisconsin. He served two terms as member of the Wisconsin State Assembly, representing Wisconsin's 48th Assembly district from 2021 to 2025. He is the first Muslim member of the Wisconsin Legislature. Before his election to the Assembly, he served six years on the Madison Common Council, and was president of the Council from 2018 to 2019.

== Early life and career ==
Samba Baldeh was born in The Gambia, in western Africa. He is a member of the Fulani tribe of semi-nomadic livestock herders. His father died when he was about four years old.

There was little formal education in Choya, which had a population of only about fifty people. The children there were taught Arabic, the Quran, and how to pray. Baldeh later described that curiosity led him to walk the six mile route each day to the "western" school, where he learned to read and speak English. His family soon consented to him moving to the capital, Banjul, at age 8 to live with his uncle and continue his education.

He attended college at the University of the Gambia and became involved in protests against the country's dictator, Yahya Jammeh. His activism brought him to Washington, D.C., in 1999 for a Global Meeting of Generations conference. It was there that he met a student coordinator for Madison Area Technical College. After the conference, he became convinced that he should further his education in science and technology. He emigrated to Madison, Wisconsin, in 2000 and earned his U.S. citizenship in 2005. He studied computer science and earned his associate's degree from Madison Area Technical College in 2007. After receiving his degree, Baldeh started a small IT consulting business and was employed as a software engineer at the Madison-based American Family Insurance.

== Political career ==
In 2015, Baldeh announced he would run for a seat on the Madison Common Council, challenging 8-year incumbent Joe Clausius. Baldeh campaigned on shifting the city's focus from downtown development to increasing services and community space in the city's neighborhoods and strengthening the fabric of the community. In the April 2015 election, Baldeh won a narrow 32 vote victory over Clausius. Baldeh was unopposed seeking reelection in 2017.

In April 2018, the common council unanimously elected Baldeh to serve as president for the 2018–2019 term. Baldeh was outspoken after the wave election of 2019 when nearly half of the common council members and the longtime Mayor of Madison, Paul Soglin, were ousted. He pointed out that such a massive change in personnel might be disruptive until the new members got up to speed, and wanted to refocus attention on one of the major campaign issues, the contentious development of the Judge Doyle Square project.

In January 2020, northern Madison's assembly representative, Melissa Sargent, announced she would forego reelection and would instead run for a newly open seat in the Wisconsin State Senate. Baldeh was one of four Democrats who entered the primary to replace her in the Wisconsin State Assembly. Baldeh ultimately prevailed in the primary with nearly 50% of the vote. He faced 19-year-old Republican Samuel Anderson in the general election, and won nearly 80% of the vote in the heavily Democratic district.

== Personal life and family ==
Samba Baldeh was born into the Fulani tribe of semi-nomadic livestock herders. His mother still lives in The Gambia. Aside from his work and political career, Baldeh has been active with the Kanifing-Madison sister city project, the AIDS Network, the Senegambia Association, and the Big Brothers Big Sisters of Madison. He has also been a member of the boards of the Young African Leaders Initiative and the 100 Black Men of Madison.

In 2016, he was a guest of Wisconsin congressman Mark Pocan to President Barack Obama's 2016 State of the Union Address.

He and his wife, Fatou, were married in 2008. They live on Madison's north side.

== Electoral history ==
=== Madison City Council (2015, 2019) ===
Madison Common Council, 17th District Election, 2015
Party	Candidate	Votes	%	±%
General Election, April 7, 2015
Nonpartisan	Samba Baldeh	1,004	50.58%	
Nonpartisan	Joe Clausius (incumbent)	972	48.97%	
	Scattering	9	0.45%	
Plurality		32	1.61%	
Total votes		1,985	100.0%	

Madison Common Council, 17th District Election, 2019
Party	Candidate	Votes	%	±%
General Election, April 2, 2019
Nonpartisan	Samba Baldeh (incumbent)	1,898	75.26%	+24.68%
Nonpartisan	James Creighton Mitchell Jr.	620	24.58%	
	Scattering	4	0.16%	
Plurality		1,278	50.67%	+49.06%
Total votes		2,522	100.0%	

=== Wisconsin Assembly (2020, 2022) ===
Wisconsin Assembly, 48th District Election, 2020
Party	Candidate	Votes	%	±%
Democratic Primary, August 11, 2020
Democratic	Samba Baldeh	7,305	49.42%	
Democratic	Lindsay Lemmer	5,215	35.28%	
Democratic	Walter Stewart	1,578	10.68%	
Democratic	Jason Vangalis	665	4.50%	
	Scattering	17	0.12%	
Plurality		2,090	14.14%	
Total votes		14,780	100.0%	
General Election, November 3, 2020
Democratic	Samba Baldeh	30,074	79.63%	
Republican	Samuel Anderson	7,650	20.25%	
	Scattering	45	0.12%	
Plurality		22,424	59.37%	-37.07%
Total votes		37,769	100.0%	+33.47%
Democratic hold				

=== Wisconsin Senate (2024) ===
Year	Election	Date	Elected				Defeated				Total	Plurality
2024	Primary	Aug. 13	Melissa Ratcliff	Democratic	17,205	52.04%	Jimmy Anderson	Dem.	10,258	31.03%	33,063	6,947
2024	Primary	Aug. 13	Melissa Ratcliff	Democratic	17,205	52.04%	Samba Baldeh	Dem.	5,575	16.86%	33,063	6,947

Wisconsin State Assembly
Preceded by Melissa Sargent	Member of the Wisconsin State Assembly from the 48th district January 4, 2021 – January 6, 2025	Succeeded by Andrew Hysell
