= Mike Capaccio =

American athletics administrator

Current position
- Title: Athletic director
- Team: The Citadel Bulldogs
- Conference: Southern Conference

Biographical details
- Born: December 17, 1957 (age 68); Chicago, Illinois, U.S.

Playing career

Basketball
- 1976–1978: Madison
- 1978–1980: Mary

Coaching career (HC unless noted)

Basketball
- 1982–1988: McHenry (Asst.)
- 1988–1998: Indian Hills (Asst.)
- 1998–1999: Indian Hills
- 1999–2002: UNC Wilmington (Asst.)

Administrative career (AD unless noted)
- 2002–2004: UNC Wilmington (Asst. AD)
- 2004–2007: UNC Wilmington
- 2010–2012: Brunswick Community College Foundation (CEO)
- 2012–2018: The Citadel (VP Athl. Dev.)
- 2018–2024: The Citadel

Head coaching record
- Overall: 38–1

Accomplishments and honors

Championships
- NJCAA National Champion: 1997, 1998, 1999

Awards
- 1999 NJCAA National Coach of the Year, 1993 Madison College Hall of Fame

Mike Capaccio (born December 17, 1957) is a retired American athletics administrator, most recently serving as athletic director of The Citadel Bulldogs in Charleston, South Carolina. He was named to that position in 2018 and stepped down in 2024. He previously served as athletic director at UNC Wilmington for two years, and as CEO of the Brunswick Community College Foundation.

== Playing career ==
Capaccio played basketball at Madison College for two years before completing his eligibility at the University of Mary. He was known as an excellent rebounder, and led the NAIA in rebounding his senior year, a mark that remains among the top ten season performances in the Mary record book through 2020 and earning a Madison Hall of Fame induction in 1993.

== Coaching career ==
Following his graduation from the University of Mary, Capaccio became an assistant coach with McHenry College. He worked there for six years before moving to Indian Hills Community College. He served with the Warriors for 11 seasons, the last of which was as head coach. In his final three seasons with the Warriors, the team won the NJCAA National Championship each year, and Capaccio was named NJCAA Coach of the Year. He next moved to UNC Wilmington as Director of Basketball Operations, moving from a two-year college to NCAA Division I.

== Administrative career ==
After three years of coaching at UNCW, Capaccio became Executive Director of the Seahawk Club, the University's athletic fundraising arm. In 2004, he became interim Athletic Director, and became permanent AD in 2005, capping a rise from Director of Basketball Operations to Athletic Director in just five years. After failing to agree to a contract extension with head men's basketball coach Brad Brownell, Capaccio was terminated in 2007. He later served as CEO of the Brunswick Community College Foundation for two years before moving to The Citadel Foundation as Vice President of Athletic Development. After a short stint as interim Athletic Director, he was named to the top job in 2018.
