= Tom Hebl =

American politician

Member of the Wisconsin State Assembly from the 46th district
- In office January 6, 1997 – January 3, 2005
- Preceded by: Rudy Silbaugh
- Succeeded by: Gary Hebl

Personal details
- Born: November 14, 1945 (age 80) Wisconsin
- Party: Democratic
- Relations: Gary Hebl (brother)

Tom Hebl (born November 14, 1945) is an American Democratic politician from Wisconsin.

Born in Madison, Wisconsin, Hebl graduated from University of Wisconsin–Whitewater and received his Juris Doctor degree from John Marshall Law School in Chicago, Illinois. In 1996, Hebl was elected to the Wisconsin State Assembly and served until 2005, when he ran for state senate to succeed Chuck Chvala. In April 2007, Hebl was elected Wisconsin Municipal Judge for the city of Sun Prairie, Wisconsin.
