= Rudy Silbaugh =

American politician (1930–2025)

Member of the Wisconsin State Assembly
- In office 1990–1996

Personal details
- Born: September 10, 1930 Viroqua, Wisconsin, U.S.
- Died: July 1, 2025 Wisconsin, U.S.
- Party: Republican
- Spouse: Janet Nysather
- Children: 3
- Occupation: Politician; flooring mechanic; business owner

Rudy Silbaugh (September 10, 1930 – July 1, 2025) was an American politician who was a member of the Wisconsin State Assembly.

== Life and career ==
Silbaugh was born in Viroqua, Wisconsin on September 10, 1930. He married Janet Nysather. The couple had three children.

Silbaugh graduated from Stoughton High School and began a career as a flooring mechanic, opening U&S Floor Coverings with Everett Urish in 1965.

Silbaugh was first elected to the Assembly in 1990. In addition, he was a Stoughton, Wisconsin, alderman from 1978 to 1991. He was a Republican. He lost the 1996 Assembly election to Democrat Tom Hebl.

Silbaugh died on July 1, 2025, at age 94.
