= Gary Hebl =

American politician

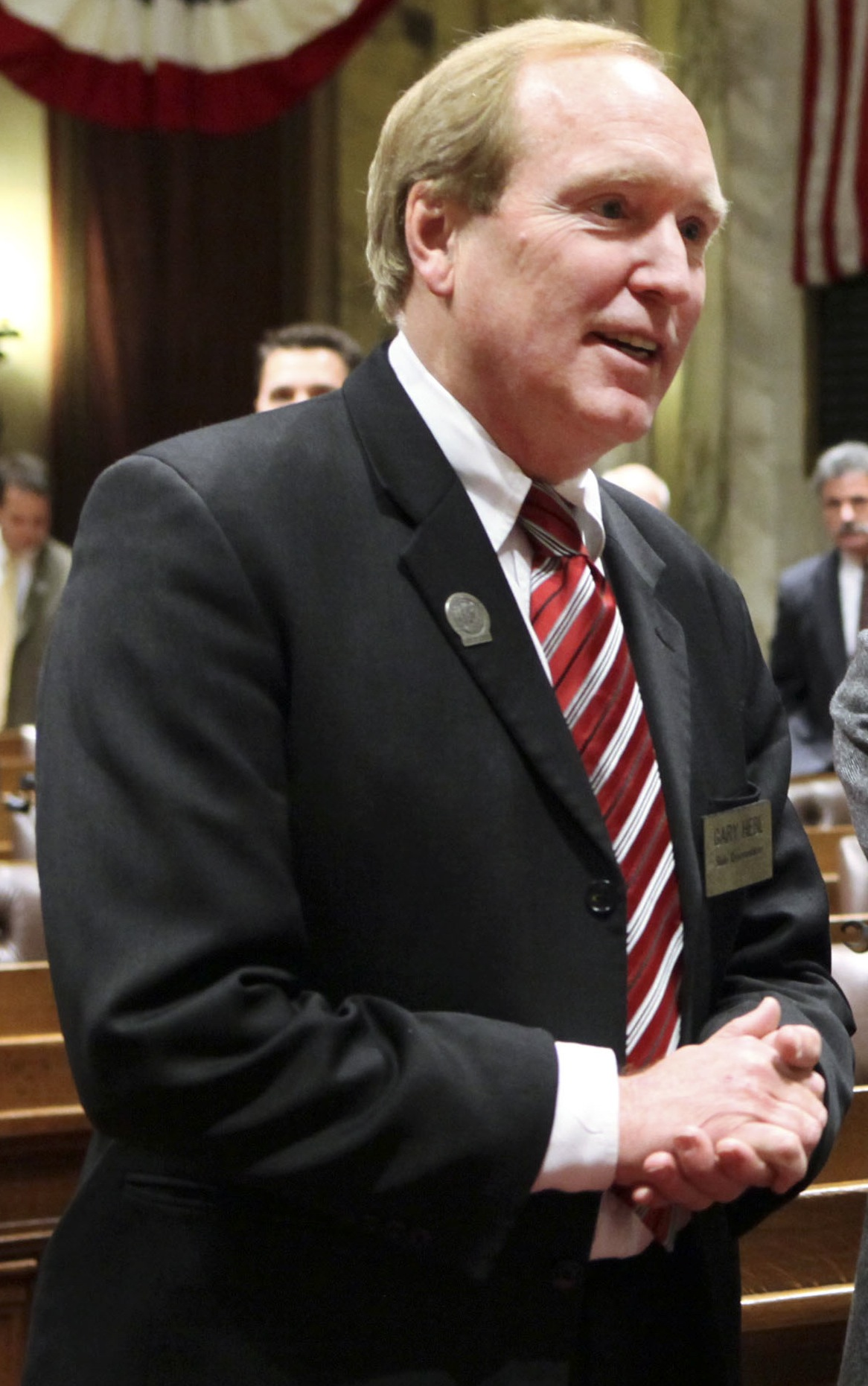
- Hebl in 2009

Member of the Wisconsin State Assembly from the 46th district
- In office January 3, 2005 – January 2, 2023
- Preceded by: Tom Hebl
- Succeeded by: Melissa Ratcliff

Personal details
- Born: May 15, 1951 (age 75) Madison, Wisconsin
- Party: Democratic
- Relatives: Tom Hebl (brother)
- Education: University of Wisconsin–Madison; Gonzaga University School of Law
- Profession: attorney, business owner
- Website: Official website

Gary Alan Hebl (born May 15, 1951) is an American lawyer, businessman, and Democratic politician from Dane County, Wisconsin. He was a member of the Wisconsin State Assembly for 18 years, representing the 46th Assembly district from 2005 through 2022.

== Biography ==
Born in Madison, Wisconsin, Hebl received his bachelor's degree from University of Wisconsin–Madison and his Juris Doctor degree from Gonzaga University School of Law. He practiced law and owned an insurance business.

Wisconsin State Assembly
Preceded by Tom Hebl	Member of the Wisconsin State Assembly from the 46th district January 3, 2005 – January 2, 2023	Succeeded by Melissa Ratcliff
