= Edward J. Roethe =

American politician and newspaper editor

Edward Roethe
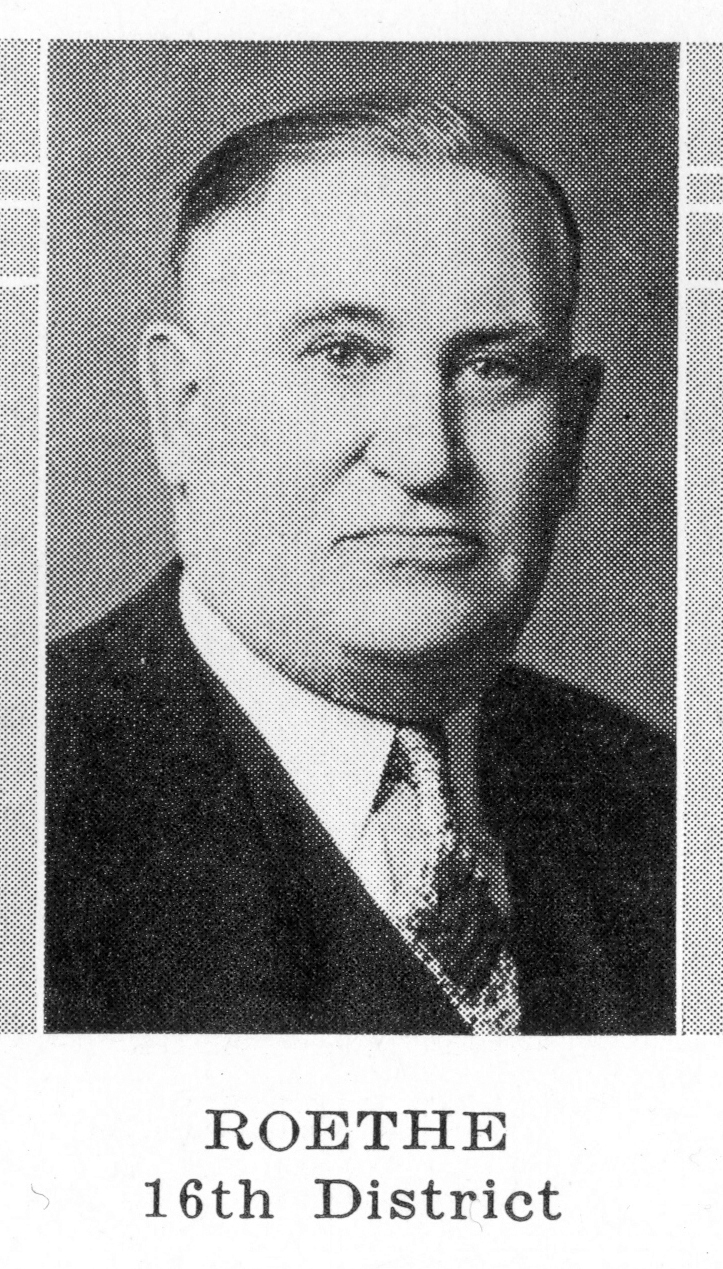

Member of the Wisconsin Senate from the 16th district
- In office January 4, 1937 – January 6, 1941
- Preceded by: William D. Carroll
- Succeeded by: Helmar Lewis
- In office January 5, 1925 – January 2, 1933
- Preceded by: Henry Edgar Roethe
- Succeeded by: William D. Carroll

Personal details
- Born: May 12, 1878 Whitewater, Wisconsin, U.S.
- Died: May 1, 1952 (aged 73) Fennimore, Wisconsin, U.S.
- Party: Republican
- Spouse: Bessie Barbara Frantz
- Relations: Henry Edgar Roethe (brother)
- Children: 6

Edward Julius Roethe (May 12, 1878 – May 1, 1952) was an American politician and newspaper editor.

== Early life ==
Roethe was born in Whitewater, Wisconsin to German immigrants Edward and Catherine Roethe. He was raised Lutheran.

== Career ==
Roethe began his career as a teacher. He later worked as the publisher of the Fennimore Times in Fennimore, Wisconsin. He served as president of the village of Fennimore in 1919 and after the community was incorporated as a city he served as the first mayor of Fennimore from 1919 to 1924. He served in the Wisconsin Senate as a Republican twice, initially as successor to his brother Henry Edgar Roethe. He married his wife Barbara Frantz on September 22, 1906 in Clark, Wisconsin.

== Personal life ==
Roethe died after suffering a stroke while working in his garden.
