= Henry Edgar Roethe =

American politician

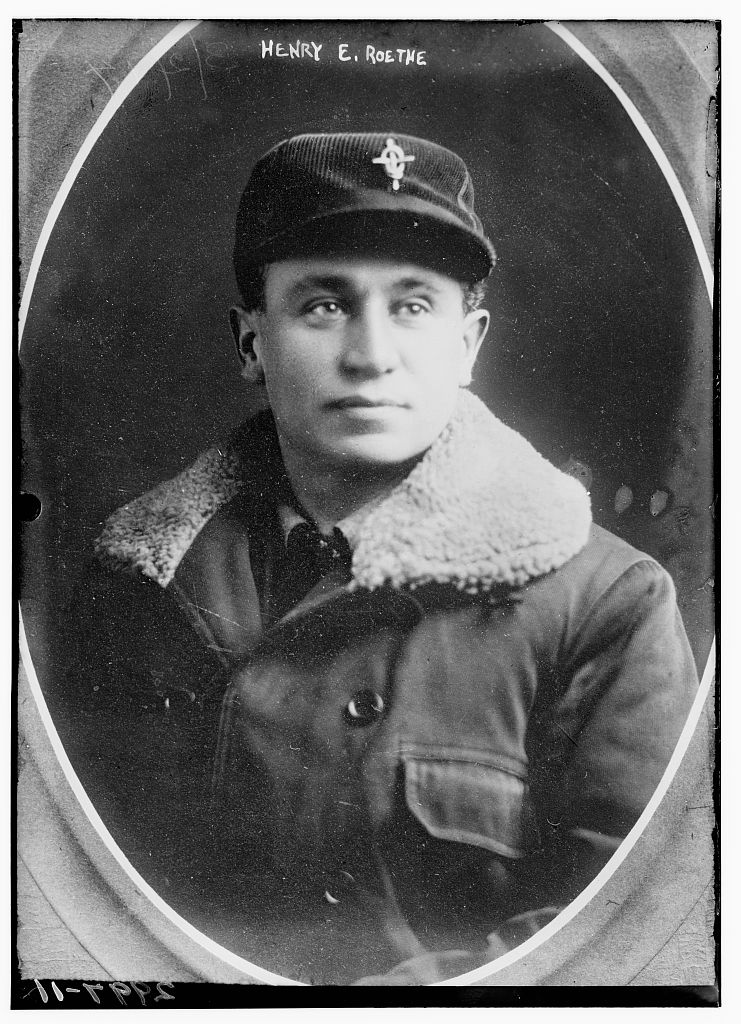

Henry Edgar Roethe (May 1866 – August 16, 1939) was an American politician and newspaper editor who was a Republican candidate for governor of Wisconsin in 1914.

== Early life and education ==
Born in Whitewater, Wisconsin, Roethe attended Whitewater Normal State School.

== Career ==
Roethe moved to Fennimore, Wisconsin, where he bought and published a newspaper. Roethe served in the Wisconsin State Assembly from 1907 to 1910 and 1913 to 1914. From 1917 to 1924, he was a member of the Wisconsin Senate for the 16th district.

== Personal life ==
Roethe committed suicide on August 16, 1939; his body was found in Lake Monona. Roethe was succeeded by his younger brother, Edward J. Roethe, in the Wisconsin Senate.
