= Joe Parisi =

21st century American politician

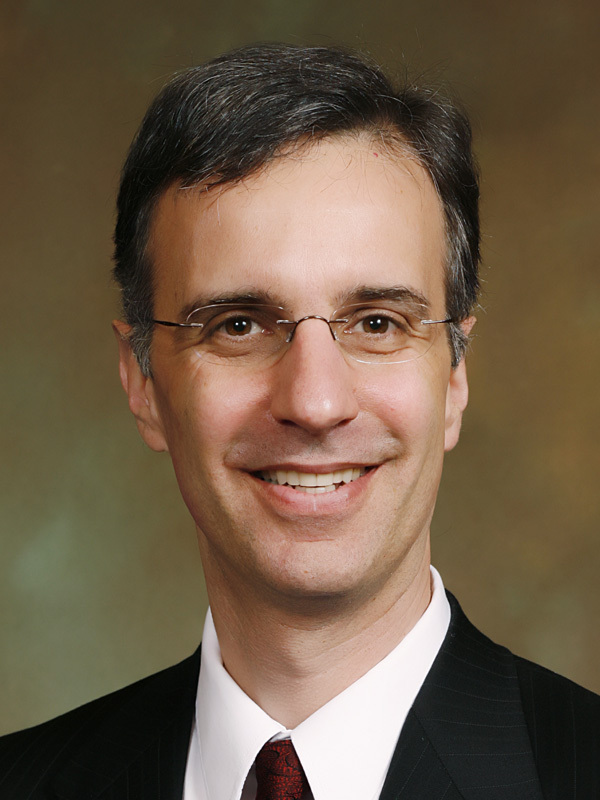
- Parisi in 2009

5th Executive of Dane County, Wisconsin
- In office April 18, 2011 – May 3, 2024
- Preceded by: Kathleen Falk
- Succeeded by: Jamie Kuhn (interim); Melissa Agard (elected)

Member of the Wisconsin State Assembly from the 48th district
- In office January 3, 2005 – April 14, 2011
- Preceded by: Mark F. Miller
- Succeeded by: Chris Taylor

Clerk of Dane County, Wisconsin
- In office January 6, 1997 – January 3, 2005
- Preceded by: Carole L. Nelson
- Succeeded by: Robert Ohlsen

Personal details
- Born: October 24, 1960 (age 65) Madison, Wisconsin, U.S.
- Party: Democratic
- Spouse: Erin Thornley
- Children: 2 daughters
- Education: Madison Area Technical College; University of Wisconsin, Madison (BA)

Joseph T. Parisi (born October 24, 1960) is an American Democratic politician from Madison, Wisconsin. He was the 5th Dane County executive, having served from April 18, 2011, until his resignation on May 3, 2024. Earlier in his career, he represented Dane County in the Wisconsin State Assembly from 2005 to 2011, and served as county clerk from 1997 to 2005.

== Background ==
Parisi was born in Madison, Wisconsin on October 24, 1960. He attended Middleton High School and Madison Area Technical College before earning a B.A. in sociology from the University of Wisconsin-Madison. He was also a drummer for the blues-rock band Honor Among Thieves.

He was elected as Dane County county clerk in the 1996 election, and served in that office until running for the Assembly in 2004.

== Legislative service ==
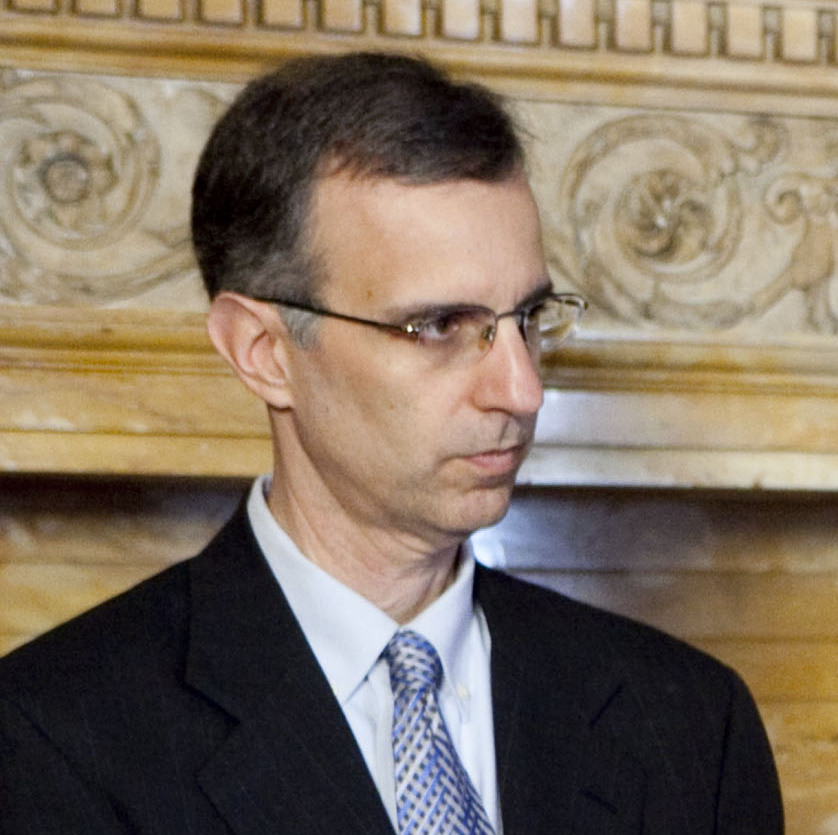
Parisi in 2009

In 2004 Parisi was elected to represent Wisconsin's 48th Assembly district.The district encompasses McFarland, Monona, the Towns of Blooming Grove and Dunn and the far eastern portion of the City of Madison. Land used in the district ranges from high-intensity urban and heavy industrial to natural areas as well as several miles of Lake Monona shoreline. Parisi won his primary by over 2:1, and in the general election defeated Dan Long (Republican) by 25,066 to 8,451. He was assigned to the standing committees on aging and long-term care, on agriculture, on budget review, on corrections and the courts, and on local and urban affairs.

In 2006, he again faced Long in the general election, and defeated him by a fractionally larger margin. In 2008, he was unopposed in both the primary and general elections. In 2010, he defeated Spencer Zimmerman (Republican) and Grant Gilbertson (independent running as a "Progress-Freedom" candidate), with 20,650 for Parisi, 6929 for Zimmerman, and 893 for Gilbertson. His work in the State Assembly focused on criminal justice, ending domestic abuse and sexual assault and workforce development. In 2014 he testified in favor of a living wage before a Senate committee that had fast-tracked legislation against it.

On April 14, 2011, after having been elected Dane County Executive, Parisi resigned from the Wisconsin State Assembly. He was succeeded by Chris Taylor, who was unopposed in the general election after winning a six-way Democratic primary election.

== Dane County Executive ==
On April 5, 2011, Parisi was elected Dane County Executive with 70.1% of the vote, defeating Eileen Bruskewitz, who garnered 29.8%. He began his two-year term on April 18. Parisi succeeded Kathleen Falk who retired in the middle of her fourth four-year term.

Parisi was elected to a full four-year term in April 2013, and re-elected in 2017, without facing opposition in either election. He was re-elected to a third full term on April 6, 2021, defeating Mary Ann Nicholson, an accountant who suspended her campaign after her husband's death but remained on the ballot. Parisi received 78.9% of the vote to Nicholson's 20.9%.

In October 2023, Parisi announced he would retire after 13 years as county executive, and plans to leave office in May 2024, a year before the expiration of his current term.

Wisconsin State Assembly
Preceded by Mark F. Miller	Member of the Wisconsin State Assembly from the 48th district January 3, 2005 – April 14, 2011	Succeeded by Chris Taylor
Political offices
Preceded by Carole L. Nelson	Clerk of Dane County, Wisconsin; January 6, 1997 – January 3, 2005	Succeeded by Robert Ohlsen
Preceded by Kathleen Falk	Executive of Dane County, Wisconsin; April 18, 2011 – May 3, 2024	Succeeded by Jamie Kuhn (interim); Melissa Agard (elected)
