= Joan Fitzgerald (politician) =

21st century American politician

Member of the Wisconsin State Assembly from the 46th district
- Incumbent
- Assumed office January 6, 2025
- Preceded by: Melissa Ratcliff

Member of the Board of Supervisors of Jefferson County, Wisconsin, from the 26th district
- In office February 2019 – April 2024
- Preceded by: Gregg Patrick
- Succeeded by: Amanda Golson

Personal details
- Born: Joan Marie Wypiszynski; October 4, 1964 (age 61) Milwaukee, Wisconsin, U.S.
- Party: Democratic
- Spouse: Gerald Reed Fitzgerald
- Children: 2
- Education: University of Wisconsin–Whitewater (B.S., M.S.)
- Profession: Educator
- Website: Campaign website

Joan Marie Fitzgerald (née Wypiszynski; born October 4, 1964) is an American Democratic politician and retired high school teacher from Jefferson County, Wisconsin. She is a member of the Wisconsin State Assembly, representing Wisconsin's 46th Assembly district since 2025. She previously served five years as a member of the Jefferson County Board of Supervisors.

== Biography ==
Joan Fitzgerald was born Joan Wypiszynski in Wisconsin. She was raised and educated in Greendale, Wisconsin, graduating from Greendale High School in 1982. She attended the University of Wisconsin–Whitewater, earning her bachelor's degree in secondary education, and then her master's in educational curriculum and instruction. She worked for 33 years as a high school math teacher in the public schools of Jefferson, Wisconsin, before retiring in 2020. She was a founding member of the Whitewater Area Chapter of Moms Demand Action for Gun Sense in America.

== Political career ==
Joan Fitzgerald obtained her first public office in 2019, when she was appointed to the Jefferson County Board of Supervisors. She was elected to a full two-year term in 2020 and re-elected without opposition in 2022.

In February 2024, Fitzgerald announced that she would run for Wisconsin State Assembly. At the time, the state's legislative maps were in flux, as the Wisconsin Supreme Court had struck down the decade-old Republican gerrymander but a remedial plan had not yet been adopted. Within days of her announcement, the state adopted a remedial redistricting plan. Fitzgerald's home region was significantly affected by the redistricting, moving her from the 33rd district to the 46th. Her new district comprised most of the western half of Jefferson County along with part of eastern Dane County; the only incumbent residing in the district, Melissa Ratcliff, had already announced a bid for state Senate, leaving an open seat in the 46th Assembly district. Fitzgerald faced no opponent in the Democratic Primary, and went on to the general election against Republican Jenifer Quimby, the mayor of Waterloo, Wisconsin. Fitzgerald won the election by 1,766 votes, and was sworn into office on January 6, 2025.

== Personal life and family ==
Joan Fitzgerald is one of three children born to Robert J. and Mary Lou (née Crabb) Wypiszynski.

Joan Wypiszynski took the last name Fitzgerald when she married Gerald Fitzgerald. They reside in Fort Atkinson, Wisconsin, and have two adult children.

== Electoral history ==
=== Wisconsin Assembly (2024) ===
Wisconsin Assembly, 46th District Election, 2024
Party	Candidate	Votes	%	±%
General Election, November 5, 2024
Democratic	Joan Fitzgerald	18,985	52.39%	−17.26pp
Republican	Jenifer Quimby	17,219	47.52%	+17.25pp
	Scattering	32	0.09%	
Plurality		1,766	4.87%	
Total votes		36,236	100.0%	+21.86%
Democratic hold				

Wisconsin State Assembly
Preceded by Melissa Ratcliff	Member of the Wisconsin State Assembly from the 46th district January 6, 2025 – present	Incumbent
