= Melissa Agard =

American politician (born 1969)

6th Executive of Dane County, Wisconsin
- Incumbent
- Assumed office November 13, 2024
- Preceded by: Jamie Kuhn (interim); Joe Parisi (elected)

Minority Leader of the Wisconsin Senate
- In office January 3, 2023 – December 1, 2023
- Preceded by: Janet Bewley
- Succeeded by: Dianne Hesselbein

Member of the Wisconsin Senate from the 16th district
- In office January 4, 2021 – January 6, 2025
- Preceded by: Mark F. Miller
- Succeeded by: Melissa Ratcliff

Member of the Wisconsin State Assembly from the 48th district
- In office January 7, 2013 – January 4, 2021
- Preceded by: Chris Taylor
- Succeeded by: Samba Baldeh

Personal details
- Born: Melissa Kristen Agard; March 28, 1969 (age 57) Madison, Wisconsin, U.S.
- Party: Democratic
- Spouse: Justin Sargent (m. 1997; div. 2019)
- Children: 4
- Education: University of Wisconsin, Madison (BS)
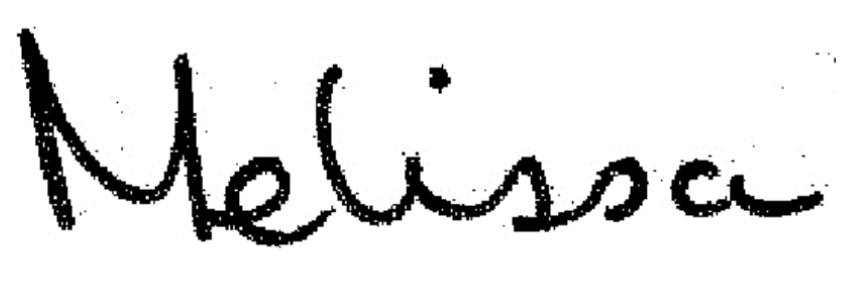
- Signature
- Website: Campaign website

Melissa Kristen Agard (born March 28, 1969) is an American small business owner and Democratic politician from Madison, Wisconsin. She is the county executive of Dane County, Wisconsin, since November 2024. She previously served four years in the Wisconsin Senate, from 2021 to 2025, and served as minority leader in 2023. Before that, she served four terms in the Wisconsin State Assembly, when she was primarily known by her married name Melissa Sargent.

== Early life and career ==
Agard was born in Madison, Wisconsin, and graduated from Madison East High School. She earned her bachelor's degree in psychology from University of Wisconsin–Madison in 1991.

She went to work as a business manager for Hyperion Studio in Madison, then co-founded Opacolor LLC with her father, Steven. Opacolor is a digital photography and print studio which Agard continues to own and operate. They specialize in original giclée prints.

In 2010, Agard's neighbors on the north side of Madison urged her to seek a newly-vacant seat on the Dane County Board of Supervisors. Agard later described her situation: "At that point, I owned my own business, I had three kids, and I just found out I was pregnant with my fourth. And I was 40 years old and feeling like one more thing on my plate would cause me to topple over." She then explained that her children came home from school that day complaining about having to do a community service project. She told them to tough it out, then decided she should do the same. Agard won election to the county board and was part of the liberal majority on that body for four years, chairing the Health and Human Needs Committee.

== 2011 Wisconsin protests ==
For fifty consecutive days during the 2011 Wisconsin protests against Governor Scott Walker's controversial "Budget Repair" legislation (2011 Wisconsin Act 10) which abolished collective bargaining for most Wisconsin public employees, Agard says that she, often accompanied by one or more of her four children, joined in the mass demonstrations, whether in the Wisconsin State Capitol or (after officials locked the Capitol), outside in the Wisconsin cold. On March 27, 2011, when the State Capitol Police ordered her three older boys to take down their protest sign proclaiming "Solidarity Forever" which was being displayed outside the "Designated Demonstration Area" they refused, and Agard was issued a ticket (said ticket was later dismissed).

== Political career ==
Following the drastic Republican redistricting in 2011, which scrambled the Madison-area assembly districts, Agard was able to run for Wisconsin State Assembly in the newly drawn 48th assembly district without an opponent from either major political party. She defeated independent Libertarian candidate Terry Gray with 83% of the general election vote. She was reelected without any opposition in 2014, 2016, and 2018.

In 2020, longtime state senator Mark F. Miller announced he would not seek reelection to a fifth term. The Madison-based senate seat attracted many interested potential candidates, but ultimately Agard had only one opponent in the Democratic primary—Monona Grove School Board president Andrew McKinney. During the primary, she renewed her commitment to pursue full decriminalization of marijuana in the state, as well as increasing the minimum wage, protecting labor rights, and providing more affordable housing. Agard prevailed in the primary, taking more than 76% of the vote. She went on to win a similarly substantial 73% majority over Republican Scott Barker in the 2020 general election.

On November 16, 2022, she was voted the Minority Leader of the Wisconsin Senate, succeeding Senator Janet Bewley who chose not to run for reelection.

In November 2023, Agard announced that she would run for Dane County executive in a special election to be held in 2024, following the early resignation of Joe Parisi. Agard advanced from the August primary and won the special election on November 5, 2024, defeating county supervisor Dana Pellebon. In the April 2025 regular election, she faced furniture salesman Stephen Ratzlaff, who she defeated by a wide margin.

== Personal life ==
Agard married Justin S. Sargent in 1997. Justin was then a legislative aide to Democratic state senator Charles Chvala and now works as chief of staff to state senator Chris Larson. They had four sons before divorcing in 2019.

== Electoral history ==
=== Wisconsin Assembly (2012–2018) ===
| Year | Election | Date | Elected | | | | Defeated | | | | Total | Plurality |
|---|---|---|---|---|---|---|---|---|---|---|---|---|
| 2012 | General | Nov. 6 | Melissa Agard Sargent | Democratic | 24,375 | 83.20% | Terry R. Gray | Ind. | 4,849 | 16.56% | 33,559 | 8,338 |
| 2012 | General | Nov. 6 | Melissa Agard Sargent | Democratic | 24,375 | 83.20% | Jonathon William Rygiewicz (write-in) | Rep. | 13 | 0.04% | 33,559 | 8,338 |
| 2014 | General | Nov. 4 | Melissa Agard Sargent (inc) | Democratic | 21,818 | 97.06% | --Unopposed-- | | | | 22,479 | 21,157 |
| 2016 | General | Nov. 8 | Melissa Agard Sargent (inc) | Democratic | 24,047 | 96.48% | --Unopposed-- | | | | 24,925 | 23,169 |
| 2018 | General | Nov. 6 | Melissa Agard Sargent (inc) | Democratic | 27,794 | 98.22% | --Unopposed-- | | | | 28,297 | 27,291 |

=== Wisconsin Senate (2020) ===
| Year | Election | Date | Elected | | | | Defeated | | | | Total | Plurality |
|---|---|---|---|---|---|---|---|---|---|---|---|---|
| 2020 | Primary | Aug. 11 | Melissa Agard Sargent | Democratic | 27,734 | 76.83% | Andrew McKinney | Dem. | 8,328 | 23.07% | 36,096 | 19,406 |
| 2020 | General | Nov. 3 | Melissa Agard Sargent | Democratic | 83,526 | 73.43% | Scott Barker | Rep. | 30,121 | 26.48% | 113,755 | 53,405 |

=== Dane County executive (2024, 2025) ===
| Year | Election | Date | Elected (Note: In nonpartisan primaries in Wisconsin, the top two vote-getters advance to the general election.) | | | | Defeated | | | | Total | Plurality |
|---|---|---|---|---|---|---|---|---|---|---|---|---|
| 2024 | Primary | Aug. 13 | Melissa Agard | Nonpartisan | 61,286 | 56.95% | Regina Vidaver | Non. | 16,269 | 15.12% | 106,907 | 42,725 |
| 2024 | Primary | Aug. 13 | Dana Pellebon | Nonpartisan | 18,561 | 17.25% | Wes Sparkman | Non. | 10,791 | 10.03% | 106,907 | 42,725 |
| 2024 | Special | Nov. 5 | Melissa Agard | Nonpartisan | 168,168 | 60.91% | Dana Pellebon | Non. | 104,487 | 37.84% | 276,112 | 63,681 |
| 2025 | General | Apr. 1 | Melissa Agard (inc) | Nonpartisan | 199,932 | 80.81% | Stephen Ratzlaff | Non. | 46,432 | 18.76% | 247,423 | 153,500 |

== Notes ==
Wisconsin State Assembly
| Preceded by Chris Taylor | Member of the Wisconsin State Assembly from the 48th district January 7, 2013 – January 4, 2021 | Succeeded by Samba Baldeh |
Wisconsin Senate
| Preceded by Mark F. Miller | Member of the Wisconsin Senate from the 16th district January 4, 2021 – January 6, 2025 | Succeeded by Melissa Ratcliff |
| Preceded by Janet Bewley | Minority Leader of the Wisconsin Senate; January 3, 2023 – December 1, 2023 | Succeeded by Dianne Hesselbein |
Political offices
| Preceded by Jamie Kuhn (interim); Joe Parisi (elected) | Executive of Dane County, Wisconsin; November 13, 2024 – present | Incumbent |
