= 2022 Wisconsin gubernatorial election =

- November 8, 2022
- Turnout: 56.7% (▼4.5%)
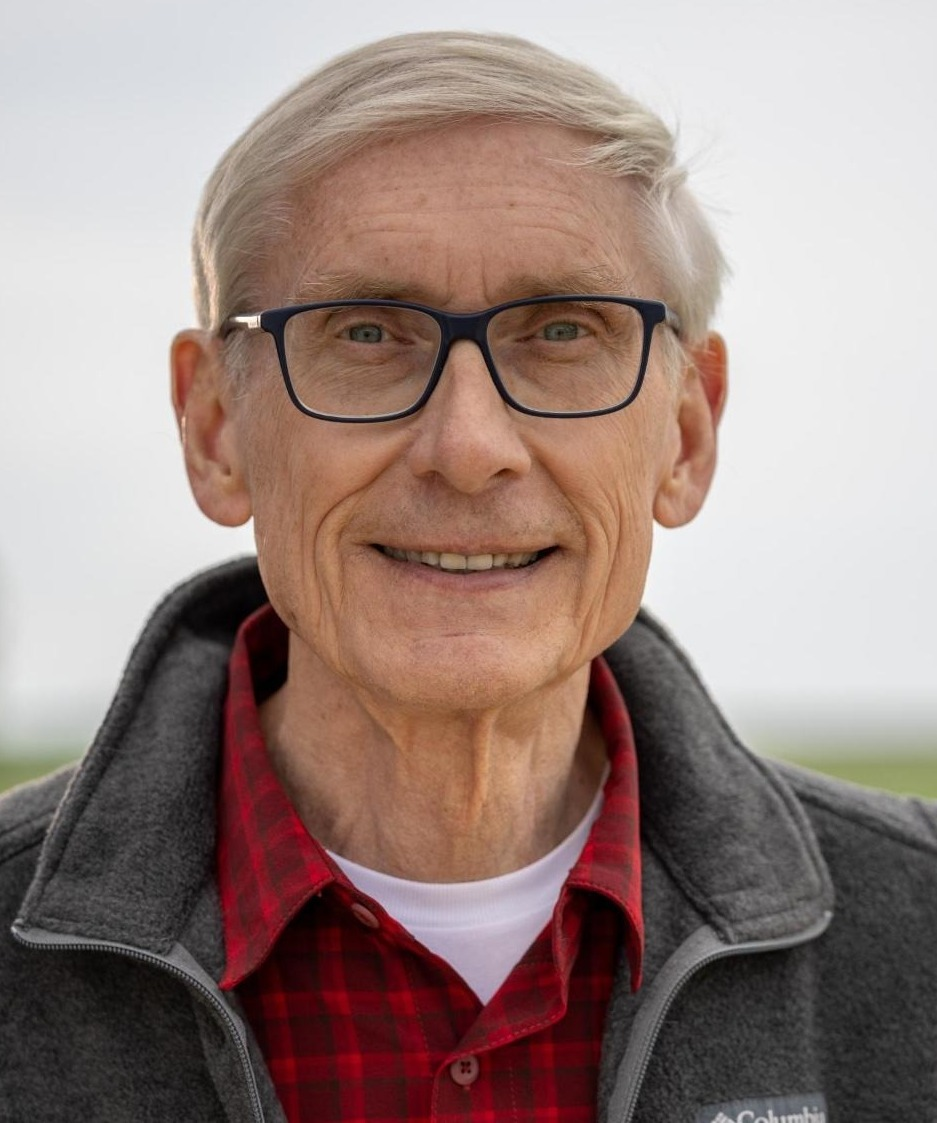

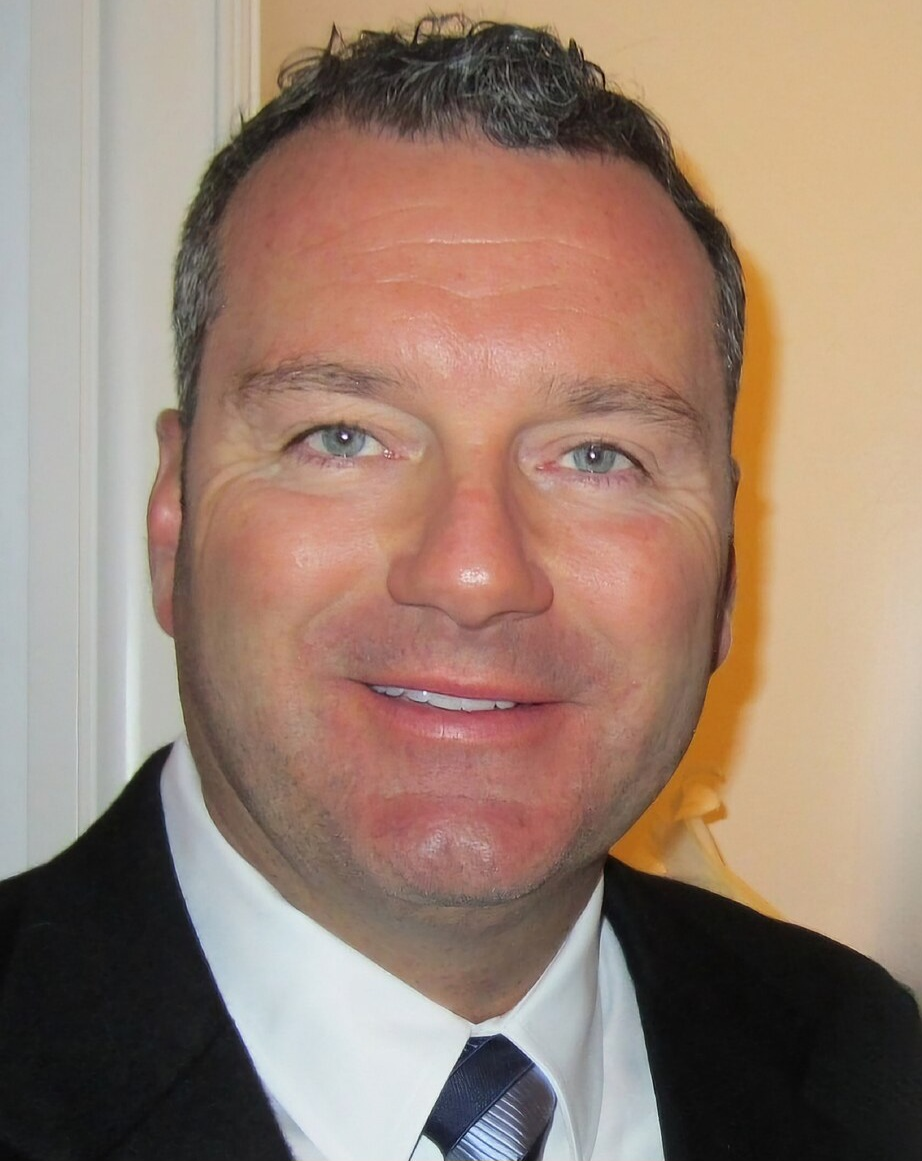
Nominee	Tony Evers	Tim Michels
Party	Democratic	Republican
Running mate	Sara Rodriguez	Roger Roth
Popular vote	1,358,774	1,268,535
Percentage	51.15%	47.75%
- Evers: 40–50% 50–60% 60–70% 70–80% 80–90% >90% Michels: 40–50% 50–60% 60–70% 70–80% 80–90% >90% Tie: 40–50% 50% No data
Governor before election
Tony Evers
Democratic
Elected Governor
Tony Evers
Democratic

The 2022 Wisconsin gubernatorial election was held on November 8, 2022, to elect the governor of Wisconsin. Democratic incumbent Tony Evers won a second term, defeating Republican nominee Tim Michels, who had previously lost by more than 10% when he ran unsuccessfully for U.S. Senate in Wisconsin in 2004.

As Lieutenant Governor Mandela Barnes ran for the U.S. Senate in the concurrent election, a new Democratic running mate, state assemblywoman Sara Rodriguez, was nominated in the partisan primary. Barnes was the second lieutenant governor not to run with the incumbent governor since the state constitution was amended in 1967. The partisan primary was held on August 9, 2022, with businessman Tim Michels defeating former lieutenant governor Rebecca Kleefisch in the Republican primary. State senator Roger Roth received the Republican nomination for lieutenant governor.

This election result was the first since 2006 in which a Democrat in Wisconsin won with an outright majority of the vote, the first since 1990 in which the winner was from the same party as the incumbent president, and the first since 1962 in which Wisconsin voted for a Democratic governor at the same time the party held the presidency. This was also the first gubernatorial election in the state since 1998 in which the winning candidate was of a different party than the winner of the concurrent U.S. Senate election.

Evers's victory was labeled an upset, as he was initially elected back in 2018 by a meager 1.1%, despite 2018 being considered a much more favorable year for Democrats than 2022. In addition, many polls showed Michels in the lead in the weeks leading up to the election. According to Ron Brownstein of CNN in 2023, Evers won independent voters by 6–7 percentage points, which contributed to Michels's defeat.

Evers did substantially better than Mandela Barnes did against incumbent senator Ron Johnson in suburban areas of the state in this election as well as compared to his initial election in 2018, chiefly in the "WOW" counties of Waukesha, Ozaukee, and Washington that form a ring around the north and west of Milwaukee, performing in line with Biden's 2020 margins. On the flip side, Michels did better in most rural areas than former governor Scott Walker had in 2018, winning the counties of Crawford, Grant, and Richland, three counties that Evers had previously won four years earlier. Michels also flipped the county of Kenosha. One exception to the trend toward Republicans in rural areas was Door County, which flipped to Evers after having voted for Walker in 2018. Notably, Evers carried the 3rd congressional district, which Republican Derrick Van Orden concurrently won after losing in 2020 to then-Representative Ron Kind; Evers also came within 0.2% of carrying the 1st congressional district.

== Democratic primary ==
=== Governor ===
==== Nominee ====
- Tony Evers, incumbent governor (2019–present)

==== Disqualified ====
- Job Edmond Hou-Seye, former alderman of Sheboygan (2015–2017)

==== Endorsements ====
Tony Evers

Organizations

- 314 Action
- Giffords
- Human Rights Campaign
- Jewish Democratic Council of America
- NARAL Pro-Choice America
- United Rural Democrats of America

Labor unions

- United Auto Workers
- Wisconsin AFL–CIO

==== Results ====
Democratic primary results
Party	Candidate	Votes	%
Democratic	Tony Evers (incumbent)	491,656	100.0%
Total votes		491,656	100.0%

=== Lieutenant governor ===
==== Candidates ====
===== Nominee =====
- Sara Rodriguez, state assemblywoman from the 13th district (2021–2023)

===== Eliminated in primary =====
- Peng Her, CEO of Hmong Institute

===== Withdrawn =====
- David Bowen, state assemblyman from the 10th district (2015–2023)
- Lena Taylor, state senator from the 4th district (2005–2024) and former state assemblywoman from the 18th district (2003–2005) (ran for mayor of Milwaukee)

===== Declined =====
- Mandela Barnes, incumbent lieutenant governor (2019–2023) (ran for U.S. Senate)

==== Endorsements ====
Sara Rodriguez

Statewide officials

- Barbara Lawton, former lieutenant governor of Wisconsin (2003–2011)

State legislators

- Jonathan Brostoff, state representative from the 19th district (2015–2022)
- Tim Carpenter, state senator from the 3rd district (2003–present)
- Sue Conley, state representative from 44th district (2021–present)
- Steve Doyle, state representative from the 94th district (2011–present)
- Jodi Emerson, state assemblywoman from the 91st district (2019–present)
- Gary Hebl, state representative from the 46th district (2005–2023)
- La Tonya Johnson, state senator from the 6th district (2017–present)
- Chris Larson, state senator from the 7th district (2011–present)
- Nick Milroy, state representative from the 73rd district (2009–2023)
- Tod Ohnstad, state representative from the 65th district (2013–2025)
- Sylvia Ortiz-Velez, state representative (Wisconsin Assembly, District 8) and Milwaukee County Board supervisor
- Daniel Riemer, state representative from the 7th district (2013–2025)
- Kelda Roys, state senator from Wisconsin Senate, District 26 (2021–present)
- Kristina Shelton, state representative from the 90th district (2021–present)
- Christine Sinicki, state representative from the 20th district (1999–present)
- Mark Spreitzer, state representative from the 45th district (2015–present)
- Lisa Subeck, state representative from the 78th district (2015–present)
- Don Vruwink, state assemblyman from the 43rd district (2017–2023)
- Robert Wirch, state senator from Wisconsin's 22nd State Senate district (1997–present)

Party officials

- Sachin Chheda, former chairman of the Milwaukee County Democratic Party
- Matthew Mareno, chairman of the Waukesha County Democratic Party
- Khary Penebaker, representative to the Democratic National Committee

Local officials

- Mike Hallquist, Rock County supervisor
- JoCasta Zamarripa, member of the Milwaukee Common Council

==== Polling ====
Poll source	Date(s) administered	Sample size (Note: Key: A – all adults RV – registered voters LV – likely voters V – unclear)	Margin of error	Peng Her	Sara Rodriguez	Undecided
Change Research (D) (Note: This poll was sponsored by 314 Action Fund, which supports Rodriguez for lieutenant governor)	July 1–7, 2022	560 (LV)	± 4.6%	8%	25%	62%

==== Results ====
Results by county: Rodriguez: 70–80%; 80–90%

Lieutenant gubernatorial Democratic primary results
Party	Candidate	Votes	%
Democratic	Sara Rodriguez	354,260	76.50%
Democratic	Peng Her	108,766	23.49%
Democratic	Angela Kennedy (write-in)	39	0.01%
Total votes		463,065	100.0

== Republican primary ==
=== Governor ===
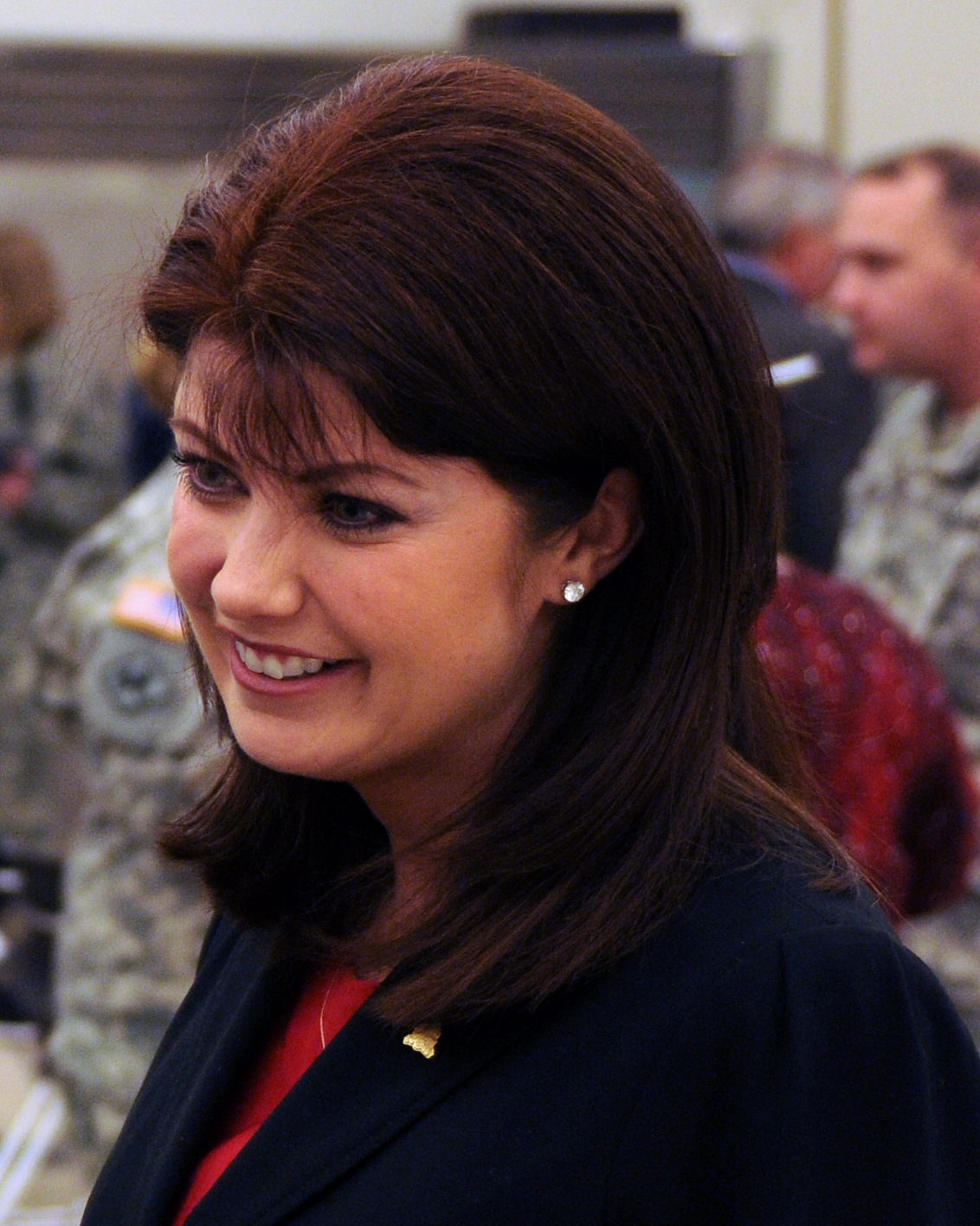
Former lieutenant governor Rebecca Kleefisch finished second in the primary.

==== Nominee ====
- Tim Michels, co-owner of the Michels Corporation and nominee for the U.S. Senate in 2004

===== Eliminated in primary =====
- Adam J. Fischer, former police officer and businessman
- Rebecca Kleefisch, former lieutenant governor (2011–2019)
- Timothy Ramthun, state representative for the 59th district

===== Disqualified =====
- James Kellen
- Leonard Larson Jr.

===== Withdrawn =====
- Kevin Nicholson, businessman, former member of the Wisconsin Board of Veterans Affairs and candidate for the U.S. Senate in 2018 (remained on ballot)
- Jonathan Wichmann, businessman (ran for lieutenant governor)

===== Declined =====
- Sean Duffy, former U.S. representative for Wisconsin's 7th congressional district (2011–2019)
- Paul Farrow, chair of the Republican Party of Wisconsin (2021–2022), Waukesha County executive (2015–present) and former state senator from the 33rd district (2013–2015)
- Mike Gallagher, U.S. representative for Wisconsin's 8th congressional district (2017–2024) (ran for re-election)
- Eric Hovde, businessman and candidate for the U.S. Senate in 2012
- Ron Johnson, U.S. senator (2011–present) (ran for re-election)
- Chris Kapenga, president of the Wisconsin Senate (2021–2025) and state senator from the 33rd district (2015–present) (ran for re-election)
- John Macco, state representative for the 88th district (2015–present) (ran for re-election; endorsed Kleefisch)
- Bill McCoshen, lobbyist
- Reince Priebus, former White House Chief of Staff (2017), former chair of the Republican National Committee (2011–2017) and former chair of the Republican Party of Wisconsin (2007–2011)
- Tommy Thompson, former governor (1987–2001), former U.S. Secretary of Health and Human Services (2001–2005) and nominee for the U.S. Senate in 2012 (endorsed Michels)
- Robin Vos, speaker of the Wisconsin State Assembly (2013–present) and state representative for the 63rd district (2005–present) (ran for re-election)
- Scott Walker, former governor (2011–2019) (endorsed Kleefisch)

==== Endorsements ====
Rebecca Kleefisch

U.S. executive branch officials

- Nikki Haley, former U.S. ambassador to the United Nations (2017–2018)
- K. T. McFarland, former Deputy National Security Advisor (2017)
- Mike Pence, 48th vice president of the United States (2017–2021)
- Sarah Huckabee Sanders, former White House Press Secretary (2017–2019) and nominee for governor of Arkansas in 2022

Federal officials

- Ted Cruz, U.S. senator from Texas (2013–)
- Jim Sensenbrenner, former U.S. representative for Wisconsin's 5th congressional district (1979–2021)
- Tom Tiffany, U.S. representative from Wisconsin's 7th congressional district (2020–)

State officials

- Kim Reynolds, governor of Iowa (2017–)
- Scott Walker, former governor of Wisconsin (2011–2019)

State legislators

- Scott Allen, state representative from the 97th district (2015–)
- David Armstrong, state representative from the 75th district (2021–)
- Tyler August, speaker pro tempore of the Wisconsin State Assembly
- Joan Ballweg, state senator from the 14th district (2021–2025)
- Elijah Behnke, state representative from the 89th district (2021–)
- Mark Born, state representative from the 39th district (2013–)
- Julian Bradley, state senator from the 28th district (2021–present)
- Robert Brooks, state representative from the 60th district (2015–)
- Rachael Cabral-Guevara, state representative from the 55th district (2021–2025)
- Calvin Callahan, state representative from the 35th district (2021–)
- Robert Cowles, state senator from the 2nd district (1987–2025)
- Alex Dallman, state representative from the 21st district (2021–)
- Alberta Darling, state senator from the 8th district (1993–2023)
- Barbara Dittrich, state representative from the 38th district (2019–)
- James W. Edming, state representative from the 87th district (2015–2025)
- John Jagler, state senator from the 13th district (2021–)
- Terry Katsma, state representative from the 26th district (2015–2025)
- Joel Kitchens, state representative from the 1st district (2015–)
- Dan Knodl, state representative from the 24th district (2009–2023)
- Scott Krug, state representative from the 72nd district (2011–)
- Tony Kurtz, state representative from the 50th district (2019–)
- Devin LeMahieu, majority leader of the Wisconsin Senate
- John Macco, state representative from the 88th district (2015–2025)
- Gae Magnafici, state representative from the 28th district (2019–2025)
- Howard Marklein, state senator from the 17th district (2015–)
- Clint Moses, state representative from the 29th district (2021–)
- Dave Murphy, state representative from the 56th district (2013–)
- Jeffrey Mursau, state representative from the 36th district (2005–)
- Stephen Nass, state senator from the 11th district (2015–)
- Adam Neylon, state representative from the 98th district (2013–)
- Todd Novak, state representative from the 51st district (2015–)
- Loren Oldenburg, state representative from the 96th district (2019–2025)
- William Penterman, state representative from the 37th district (2021–)
- Kevin David Petersen, state representative from the 40th district (2007–)
- Jon Plumer, state representative from the 42nd district (2018–2025)
- Treig Pronschinske, state representative from the 92nd district (2017–)
- Jessie Rodriguez, state representative from the 21st district (2013–)
- Donna Rozar, state representative from the 69th district (2021–2025)
- Michael Schraa, state representative from the 53rd district (2013–2025)
- Ken Skowronski, state representative from the 82nd district (2014–2023)
- Patrick Snyder, state representative from the 85th district (2017–)
- Shae Sortwell, state representative from the 2nd district (2019–)
- John Spiros, state representative from the 86th district (2013–)
- Rob Stafsholt, state senator from the 10th district (2021–)
- David Steffen, state representative from the 4th district (2015–)
- Jim Steineke, majority leader of the Wisconsin State Assembly
- Rob Summerfield, state representative from the 67th district (2017–)
- Rob Swearingen, state representative from the 34th district (2013–)
- Gary Tauchen, state representative from the 6th district (2007–2023)
- Jeremy Thiesfeldt, state representative from the 52nd district (2011–2023)
- Paul Tittl, state representative from the 25th district (2013–)
- Travis Tranel, state representative from the 49th district (2011–)
- Ron Tusler, state representative from the 3rd district (2017–)
- Robin Vos, speaker of the Wisconsin State Assembly
- Van H. Wanggaard, state senator from the 21st district (2011–2012, 2015–)
- Chuck Wichgers, state representative from the 83rd district (2017–)
- Robert Wittke, state representative from the 62nd district (2019–)
- Shannon Zimmerman, state representative from the 30th district (2017–)

Sheriffs

- 39 county sheriffs

Local officials

- 101 local officials

Individuals

- Grover Norquist, founder and president of Americans for Tax Reform
- Ted Nugent, singer and activist

Organizations

- American Conservative Union
- Associated Builders and Contractors of Wisconsin
- Milwaukee Police Association
- Susan B. Anthony Pro-Life America Candidate Fund
- Wisconsin Family Action PAC
- Wisconsin Fraternal Order of Police
- Wisconsin Manufacturers & Commerce
- Wisconsin Right to Life
- Wisconsin Young Republicans
Tim Michels

U.S. executive branch officials

- Donald Trump, 45th president of the United States (2017–2021)

Statewide officials

- Tommy Thompson, former governor of Wisconsin (1987–2001)

Organizations

- Save America PAC
- Wisconsin Right to Life
Kevin Nicholson (withdrew)

Individuals

- Dick Uihlein, founder of Uline

Organizations

- Wisconsin Family Action PAC
Timothy Ramthun

Federal officials

- Michael Flynn, former United States National Security advisor (2017), former director of the Defense Intelligence Agency (2012–2014) (Democrat)

Individuals

- Mike Lindell, founder and CEO of My Pillow
Declined to endorse

Organizations

- Republican Party of Wisconsin

==== Polling ====
Poll source	Date(s) administered	Sample size	Margin of error	Eric Hovde	Rebecca Kleefisch	Tim Michels	Kevin Nicholson	Tim Ramthun	Jonathan Wichmann	Other	Undecided
Trafalgar Group (R)	August 6–8, 2022	1,092 (LV)	± 2.9%	–	43%	44%	3%	8%	–	3% (Note: Fischer with 3%)	–
Emerson College	August 3–5, 2022	900 (LV)	± 3.2%	–	36%	34%	6%	8%	–	2% (Note: Fischer and "Someone else" with 2%)	14%
NMB Research (R) (Note: This poll was sponsored by Sunrise in America Political Fund, which supports Michels)	July 16–18, 2022	500 (LV)	± 4.4%	–	35%	43%	–	–	–	3%	19%
	July 5, 2022	Nicholson suspends his campaign									
Marquette University	June 14–20, 2022	359 (LV)	± 6.3%	–	26%	27%	10%	3%	–	2% (Note: "Someone else" with 2%; Fischer with 0%)	32%
Public Policy Polling (D) (Note: This poll was sponsored by Milwaukee Works, a local 501(c)(4))	May 9–10, 2022	675 (LV)	± 3.8%	–	26%	27%	9%	6%	–	3%	29%
Marquette University	April 19–24, 2022	413 (LV)	± 5.6%	–	32%	–	10%	4%	–	3%	47%
Remington Research Group (R) (Note: This poll was sponsored by Fight for Wisconsin, which supports Nicholson)	March 31 – April 2, 2022	1,207 (LV)	± 2.9%	4%	42%	–	29%	–	–	–	26%
Marquette University	February 22–27, 2022	353 (LV)	± 5.8%	–	30%	–	8%	5%	–	1%	56%
WPA Intelligence (R)	January 18, 2022	– (LV)	–	3%	59%	–	8%	–	–	–	–
The Tarrance Group (R) (Note: This poll was sponsored by Rebecca Kleefisch's campaign)	January 10–13, 2022	800 (LV)	± 3.5%	–	65%	–	12%	–	–	–	23%
The Tarrance Group (R)	January 10–13, 2022	800 (LV)	± 3.5%	–	61%	–	8%	–	5%	2%	24%

==== Results ====
Results by county: Michels: 30–40%; 40–50%; 50–60%; 60–70%; Kleefisch: 40–50%; 50–60%

Republican primary results
Party	Candidate	Votes	%
Republican	Tim Michels	326,969	47.18%
Republican	Rebecca Kleefisch	291,384	42.05%
Republican	Timothy Ramthun	41,639	6.01%
Republican	Kevin Nicholson (withdrawn)	24,884	3.59%
Republican	Adam Fischer	8,139	1.17%
Total votes		693,015	100.0%

=== Lieutenant governor ===
==== Candidates ====
===== Nominee =====
- Roger Roth, state senator from the 19th district (2015–2023)

===== Eliminated in primary =====
- David D. King, businessman and perennial candidate
- Will Martin, former Wisconsin Department of Workforce Development official
- Patrick Testin, state senator from the 24th district (2017–present)
- David Varnam, mayor of Lancaster (2016–present)
- Cindy Werner, businesswoman and candidate for Wisconsin's 4th congressional district in 2018 and 2020
- Jonathan Wichmann, businessman
- Kyle Yudes, activist

===== Withdrawn =====
- Ben Voelkel, former aide to U.S. senator Ron Johnson

==== Endorsements ====
Will Martin

Local officials

- David DeGroot, Mount Pleasant board of trustees president
- Jonathan Delegrave, Racine County executive
- Patricia Hansen, Racine County district attorney
- Don Houston, Waterford board of trustees president
- Jean Jacobson, former Racine County executive
- Thomas Kramer, Racine County board vice chair
- Claude Lois, former Burlington mayor
- William McReynolds, former Racine County sheriff
- Thomas Roanhouse, Racine County board chair
- Christopher Schmaling, Racine County sheriff
- Steve Wicklund, Union Grove board of trustees president
Patrick Testin

State senators

- Kathy Bernier, state senator from the 23rd district (2019–2023)
- Julian Bradley, state senator from the 28th district (2021–)
- Alberta Darling, state senator from the 8th district (1993–2023)
- Dan Feyen, state senator from the 18th district (2017–)
- Sheila Harsdorf, former state senator from the 10th district (2001–2017)
- John Jagler, state senator from the 13th district (2021–)
- Dan Kapanke, former state senator from the 32nd district (2005–2011)
- Stephen Nass, state senator from the 11th district (2015–)
- Luther Olsen, former state senator from the 14th district (2005–2021)
- Van Wanggaard, state senator from the 21st district (2015–)

State assemblymembers

- David Armstrong, state assemblyman from the 75th district
- Calvin Callahan, state assemblyman from the 35h district (2021–)
- Alex Dallman, state assemblyman from the 41st district (2021–)
- Barbara Dittrich, state assemblyman from the 38th district (2019–)
- James W. Edming, state assemblyman from the 87th district (2015–2025)
- Mike Huebsch, state assemblyman from the 94th district
- Jesse James, state assemblyman from the 68th district
- Joel Kitchens, state assemblyman from the 1st district (2015–)
- Scott Krug, state assemblyman from the 72nd district (2011–)
- Mike Kuglitsch, state assemblyman from the 84th district (2011–2022)
- Bob Kulp, former state assemblyman from the 69th district (2013–2021)
- Tony Kurtz, state assemblyman from the 50th district (2019–)
- John Macco, state assemblyman from the 88th district (2015–2025)
- Gae Magnafici, state assemblywoman from the 28th district (2019–2025)
- Jeffrey Mursau, state assemblyman from the 36th district (2005–)
- Todd Novak, state assemblyman from the 51st district (2015–)
- Loren Oldenburg, state assemblyman from the 96th district (2019–2025)
- Jon Plumer, state assemblyman from the 42nd district (2018–2025)
- Jessie Rodriguez, state assemblywoman from the 21st district (2013–)
- Joe Sanfelippo, state assemblyman from the 15th district (2013–2023)
- Ken Skowronski, state assemblyman from the 82nd district (2014–2023)
- Patrick Snyder, state assemblyman from the 85th district (2017–)
- John Spiros, state assemblyman from the 86th district (2013–)
- Jim Steineke, majority leader of the Wisconsin State Assembly
- Rob Swearingen, state assemblyman from the 34th district (2013–)
- Gary Tauchen, state assemblyman from the 6th district (2007–2023)
- Paul Tittl, state assemblyman from the 25th district (2013–)
- Ron Tusler, state assemblyman from the 3rd district (2017–)
- Robert Wittke, state assemblyman from the 62nd district (2019–)

Organizations

- Wisconsin Right to Life (co-endorsed with Varnam)
- Wisconsin Young Republicans
David Varnam

Organizations

- Wisconsin Family Action PAC
- Wisconsin Right to Life (co-endorsed with Testin)
Jonathan Wichmann

Federal officials

- Michael Flynn, former United States National Security advisor (2017), former director of the Defense Intelligence Agency (2012–2014) (Democrat)

Organizations

- Stand for Health Freedom
Declined to endorse

Organizations

- Republican Party of Wisconsin

==== Results ====
Results by county: Roth: 10–20%; 20–30%; 30–40%; 40–50%; 50–60%; Testin: 10–20%; 20–30%; 30–40%; 40–50%; 50–60%; 60–70%; 70–80%; Werner: 20–30%; Wichmann: 10–20%; Yudes: 20–30%; Varnam: 10–20%; 40–50%

Lieutenant gubernatorial Republican primary results
Party	Candidate	Votes	%
Republican	Roger Roth	178,972	30.16%
Republican	Patrick Testin	109,374	18.43%
Republican	Cindy Werner	80,953	13.64%
Republican	Jonathan Wichmann	79,166	13.34%
Republican	Will Martin	54,790	9.23%
Republican	Kyle Yudes	32,051	5.40%
Republican	David C. Varnam	30,640	5.16%
Republican	David D. King	27,443	4.63%
Total votes		593,389	100.0%

== Independents ==
=== Candidates ===
==== Withdrawn ====
- Joan Ellis Beglinger, retired nurse and hospital administrator (remained on ballot; endorsed Michels)
  - Running mate: N/A (Note: Beglinger withdrew prior to announcing a running mate)
- Jess Hisel, engineer and Air Force veteran
  - Running mate: N/A (Note: Hisel withdrew prior to announcing a running mate)

== General election ==
=== Predictions ===
Source	Ranking	As of
The Cook Political Report	Tossup	June 8, 2022
Inside Elections	Tossup	March 4, 2022
Sabato's Crystal Ball	Lean R (flip)	November 7, 2022
Politico	Tossup	April 1, 2022
RCP	Tossup	June 1, 2022
Fox News	Tossup	May 12, 2022
538	Tossup	October 7, 2022
Elections Daily	Lean R (flip)	November 7, 2022

=== Post-primary endorsements ===
Tony Evers (D)

U.S. executive branch officials

- Joe Biden, 46th president of the United States (2021–2025)
- Barack Obama, 44th president of the United States (2009–2017)

U.S. senators

- Tammy Baldwin, U.S. senator from Wisconsin (2013–present)
- Elizabeth Warren, U.S. senator from Massachusetts (2013–present)

U.S. representatives

- Ron Kind, former U.S. representative for Wisconsin's 3rd congressional district (1997–2023)
- Gwen Moore, U.S. representative for Wisconsin's 4th congressional district (2005–present)
- Mark Pocan, U.S. representative for Wisconsin's 2nd congressional district (2013–present)

Statewide officials

- Josh Kaul, attorney general of Wisconsin (2019–present)
- J. B. Pritzker, governor of Illinois (2019–present)

State legislators

- Melissa Agard, state senator for the 16th district (2021–2025)
- Jill Billings, state assembly member for the 95th district (2011–present)
- Jodi Emerson, state assembly member for the 91st district (2019–present)
- Dave Hansen, state senator for the 30th district (2001–2021)
- Gary Hebl, state assembly member for the 46th district (2005–2023)
- Brad Pfaff, state senator for the 32nd district (2021–present)
- Jeff Smith, state senator for the 31st district (2019–present)

Local officials

- Paul Esser, mayor of Sun Prairie, Wisconsin
- Cavalier Johnson, mayor of Milwaukee (2021–present)

Organizations

- End Citizens United
- Everytown for Gun Safety
- Fair Wisconsin
- Feminist Majority PAC
- League of Conservation Voters – Wisconsin
- Let America Vote
- MoveOn
- Planned Parenthood Advocates of Wisconsin
- Working Families Party

Labor unions

- Communications Workers of America
- National Education Association – Wisconsin

Newspapers

- Milwaukee Journal Sentinel
- Shepherd Express
- Wisconsin State Journal
Tim Michels (R)

U.S. senators

- Ron Johnson, U.S. senator from Wisconsin (2011–present)

U.S. representatives

- Bryan Steil, U.S. representative for Wisconsin's 1st congressional district (2019–present)

Statewide officials

- Ron DeSantis, governor of Florida (2019–present)
- Michael Gableman, justice of the Wisconsin Supreme Court (2008–2018)
- Rebecca Kleefisch, lieutenant governor of Wisconsin (2011–2019)
- Scott Walker, governor of Wisconsin (2011–2019)
- Glenn Youngkin, governor of Virginia (2022–2026)

State legislators

- Don Pridemore, state assemblymember for the 22nd district (2011–2015) and the 99th district (2005–2011)

Individuals

- Joan Ellis Beglinger, retired nurse, hospital administrator, and former Independent candidate for Governor of Wisconsin in 2022
- Diane Hendricks, businesswoman

Organizations

- Club for Growth
- Dairy Business Association
- Milwaukee Police Association
- National Federation of Independent Business – Wisconsin
- NRA Political Victory Fund
- Tavern League of Wisconsin
- Wisconsin Farm Bureau
- Wisconsin Troopers Association

=== Polling ===
Aggregate polls

Source of poll aggregation	Dates administered	Dates updated	Tony Evers (D)	Tim Michels (R)	Joan Ellis Beglinger (I)	Undecided (Note: Calculated by taking the difference of 100% and all other candidates combined.)	Margin
RealClearPolitics	September 20 – November 1, 2022	November 1, 2022	48.2%	48.4%	–	3.4%	Michels +0.2
FiveThirtyEight	August 15 – November 2, 2022	November 2, 2022	47.5%	48.9%	2.2%	1.4%	Michels +1.4
Average			47.9%	48.7%	–	3.4%	Michels +0.8

Poll source	Date(s) administered	Sample size	Margin of error	Tony Evers (D)	Tim Michels (R)	Joan Ellis Beglinger (I)	Other	Undecided
Civiqs	November 4–7, 2022	739 (LV)	± 3.7%	51%	48%	–	1% (Note: "Someone else" with 1%)	1%
Research Co.	November 4–6, 2022	450 (LV)	± 4.6%	48%	48%	–	–	4%
Data for Progress (D)	November 2–5, 2022	1,504 (LV)	± 2.0%	48%	50%	2%	–	–
The Trafalgar Group (R)	November 2–4, 2022	1,095 (LV)	± 2.9%	48%	50%	1%	–	2%
Marquette University	October 24 – November 1, 2022	802 (RV)	± 4.6%	44%	45%	5%	3% (Note: "Refused" with 3%)	3%
Marquette University	October 24 – November 1, 2022	679 (LV)	± 4.8%	48%	48%	2%	–	1%
Siena College	October 27–31, 2022	655 (LV)	± 4.8%	47%	45%	–	2% (Note: "Another candidate" with 1%; "Not going to vote" with 1%)	6%
Fox News	October 26–30, 2022	1,000 (RV)	± 3.0%	46%	47%	–	3% (Note: "Other" with 2%; "Wouldn't vote" with 1%)	4%
Wick Insights	October 26–30, 2022	1,089 (LV)	± 3.2%	47%	48%	–	2% (Note: "Someone else" with 2%)	4%
Emerson College	October 27–29, 2022	1,000 (LV)	± 3.0%	47%	48%	2%	<1% (Note: "Someone else" with <1%)	3%
Emerson College	October 27–29, 2022	1,000 (LV)	± 3.0%	48%	49%	2%	1% (Note: "Someone else" with 1%)	–
Patriot Polling	October 20–23, 2022	801 (LV)	–	46%	50%	–	4%	
Data for Progress (D)	October 14–22, 2022	1,376 (LV)	± 3.0%	48%	49%	1%	–	2%
CNN/SSRS	October 13–17, 2022	905 (RV)	± 4.2%	50%	46%	–	4% (Note: "Neither" with 3%; "Other" with 1%)	–
CNN/SSRS	October 13–17, 2022	714 (LV)	± 4.5%	50%	48%	–	1% (Note: "Neither" with 1%)	–
Marquette University	October 3–9, 2022	801 (RV)	± 4.3%	46%	41%	7%	2% (Note: "Other" with 1%; "Refused" with 1%)	3%
Marquette University	October 3–9, 2022	652 (LV)	± 4.8%	47%	46%	4%	2%	1%
YouGov/CBS News	October 3–7, 2022	1,138 (RV)	± 3.7%	50%	50%	–	0%	0%
Public Policy Polling (D)	September 26–27, 2022	574 (V)	–	48%	46%	–	–	5%
Fox News	September 22–26, 2022	1,012 (RV)	± 3.0%	47%	47%	–	2% (Note: "Wouldn't vote" with 1%;"Other" with 1%)	4%
Fabrazio Ward (R)/Impact Research (D)	September 18–25, 2022	1399 (LV)	± 4.4%	47%	50%	–	–	3%
Data for Progress (D)	September 20–23, 2022	999 (LV)	± 3.0%	47%	48%	2%	–	3%
The Trafalgar Group (R)	September 15–19, 2022	1087 (LV)	± 2.9%	47%	48%	–	2%	3%
Emerson College	September 16–18, 2022	860 (LV)	± 3.27%	45%	43%	4%	1%	7%
Big Data Poll (R)	September 17–18, 2022	852 (LV)	± 3.4%	42%	42%			14%
Siena College	September 14–15, 2022	651 (LV)	± 4.5%	49%	44%	–	2% (Note: "Another candidate" with 1%, "Not going to vote" with 1%)	5%
Civiqs	September 10–13, 2022	780 (LV)	± 3.7%	49%	48%	–	2%	3%
Marquette University	September 6–11, 2022	801 (RV)	± 4.3%	44%	43%	8%	1%	4%
Marquette University	September 6–11, 2022	632 (LV)	± 4.9%	47%	44%	5%	0%	3%
	September 4, 2022	Beglinger withdraws from the race						
The Trafalgar Group (R)	August 22–25, 2022	1,091 (LV)	± 2.9%	48%	48%	–	2%	3%
OnMessage Inc. (R) (Note: This poll was sponsored by School Choice Wisconsin Action)	August 22–24, 2022	600 (LV)	± 4.0%	48%	48%	–	–	4%
Fox News	August 12–16, 2022	1,006 (RV)	± 3.0%	49%	46%	–	1%	3%
Marquette University	August 10–15, 2022	811 (RV)	± 4.2%	45%	43%	7%	0%	5%
Marquette University	August 10–15, 2022	713 (LV)	± 4.5%	46%	44%	5%	0%	5%
Marquette University	June 14–20, 2022	803 (RV)	± 4.3%	48%	41%	–	2%	9%

Hypothetical polling

Tony Evers vs. Rebecca Kleefisch

Poll source	Date(s) administered	Sample size	Margin of error	Tony Evers (D)	Rebecca Kleefisch (R)	Other	Undecided
Marquette University	June 14–20, 2022	803 (RV)	± 4.3%	47%	43%	1%	8%
Redfield & Wilton Strategies	August 20–24, 2021	730 (RV)	± 3.6%	39%	38%	3%	14%
Redfield & Wilton Strategies	August 20–24, 2021	718 (LV)	± 3.7%	41%	41%	3%	12%
Change Research (D) (Note: This poll was sponsored by Tom Nelson's campaign)	March 25–27, 2021	1,723 (LV)	± 2.6%	48%	43%	–	–

Tony Evers vs. Tim Ramthun

Poll source	Date(s) administered	Sample size	Margin of error	Tony Evers (D)	Tim Ramthun (R)	Other	Undecided
Marquette University	June 14–20, 2022	803 (RV)	± 4.3%	51%	34%	2%	12%

Tony Evers vs. Kevin Nicholson

Poll source	Date(s) administered	Sample size	Margin of error	Tony Evers (D)	Kevin Nicholson (R)	Other	Undecided
Marquette University	June 14–20, 2022	803 (RV)	± 4.3%	48%	40%	1%	9%

Tony Evers vs. Jonathan Wichmann

Poll source	Date(s) administered	Sample size	Margin of error	Tony Evers (D)	Jonathan Wichmann (R)	Other	Undecided
Redfield & Wilton Strategies	August 20–24, 2021	730 (RV)	± 3.6%	41%	34%	5%	14%
Redfield & Wilton Strategies	August 20–24, 2021	718 (LV)	± 3.7%	43%	36%	4%	12%

Tony Evers vs. generic Republican

Poll source	Date(s) administered	Sample size	Margin of error	Tony Evers (D)	Generic Republican	Undecided
Cygnal (R)	July 6–8, 2021	640 (LV)	± 3.9%	47%	48%	6%
Public Policy Polling (D)	February 8–9, 2021	937 (V)	± 3.2%	45%	44%	11%

=== Debates ===
2022 Wisconsin gubernatorial general election debates
No.	Date	Host	Moderator	Link	Democratic	Republican
Key: P Participant A Absent N Non-invitee I Invitee W Withdrawn						
Key: P Participant A Absent N Non-invitee I Invitee W Withdrawn					Tony Evers	Tim Michels
1	Oct. 14, 2022	WBAY-TV	Jill Geisler		P	P

=== Results ===
2022 Wisconsin gubernatorial election
Party	Candidate	Votes	%	±%
Democratic	Tony Evers (incumbent); Sara Rodriguez	1,358,774	51.15%	+1.61%
Republican	Tim Michels; Roger Roth	1,268,535	47.75%	−0.69%
Independent	Joan Ellis Beglinger (withdrawn); N/A	27,198	1.02%	N/A
Write-in		1,983	0.07%	+0.03%
Total votes		2,656,490	100.00%	N/A
Democratic hold				

==== By county ====
County	Tony Evers Democratic		Tim Michels Republican		Various candidates Other parties		Margin		Total votes cast
County	#	%	#	%	#	%	#	%	Total votes cast
Adams	3,860	38.96%	5,856	59.10%	192	1.94%	−1,996	−20.15%	9,908
Ashland	4,034	57.51%	2,905	41.41%	76	1.08%	1,129	16.09%	7,015
Barron	7,552	37.51%	12,246	60.83%	335	1.66%	−4,694	−23.31%	20,133
Bayfield	5,367	57.77%	3,843	41.36%	81	0.87%	1,524	16.40%	9,291
Brown	53,887	47.18%	58,986	51.65%	1,332	1.17%	−5,099	−4.46%	114,205
Buffalo	2,391	38.95%	3,638	59.27%	109	1.78%	−1,247	−20.32%	6,138
Burnett	2,964	36.40%	5,061	62.16%	117	1.44%	−2,097	−25.76%	8,142
Calumet	9,935	39.70%	14,828	59.25%	262	1.05%	−4,893	−19.55%	25,025
Chippewa	11,994	41.07%	16,792	57.50%	415	1.42%	−4,798	−16.43%	29,201
Clark	3,797	32.48%	7,690	65.77%	205	1.75%	−3,893	−33.30%	11,692
Columbia	14,168	51.57%	13,008	47.34%	300	1.09%	1,160	4.22%	27,476
Crawford	3,429	48.94%	3,486	49.76%	91	1.30%	−57	−0.81%	7,006
Dane	236,577	78.59%	62,300	20.70%	2,156	0.72%	174,277	57.89%	301,033
Dodge	13,240	33.88%	25,428	65.06%	414	1.06%	−12,188	−31.19%	39,082
Door	8,984	51.92%	8,145	47.07%	176	1.02%	839	4.85%	17,305
Douglas	10,606	56.90%	7,823	41.97%	210	1.13%	2,783	14.93%	18,639
Dunn	8,299	45.02%	9,899	53.70%	237	1.29%	−1,600	−8.68%	18,435
Eau Claire	28,063	57.91%	19,856	40.97%	542	1.12%	8,207	16.94%	48,461
Florence	655	26.02%	1,838	73.02%	24	0.95%	−1,183	−47.00%	2,517
Fond du Lac	16,598	35.53%	29,642	63.45%	478	1.02%	−13,044	−27.92%	46,718
Forest	1,452	34.65%	2,670	63.72%	68	1.62%	−1,218	−29.07%	4,190
Grant	9,234	45.95%	10,594	52.72%	266	1.32%	−1,360	−6.77%	20,094
Green	9,603	54.77%	7,681	43.81%	248	1.41%	1,922	10.96%	17,532
Green Lake	2,746	31.51%	5,864	67.29%	104	1.19%	−3,118	−35.78%	8,714
Iowa	6,837	58.55%	4,717	40.39%	124	1.06%	2,120	18.15%	11,678
Iron	1,259	38.62%	1,964	60.25%	37	1.13%	−705	−21.63%	3,260
Jackson	3,505	43.82%	4,375	54.69%	119	1.49%	−870	−10.88%	7,999
Jefferson	16,765	43.28%	21,488	55.48%	479	1.24%	−4,723	−12.19%	38,732
Juneau	4,048	37.70%	6,516	60.68%	174	1.62%	−2,468	−22.98%	10,738
Kenosha	32,176	48.70%	33,068	50.05%	829	1.25%	−892	−1.35%	66,073
Kewaunee	3,529	35.67%	6,229	62.96%	135	1.36%	−2,700	−27.29%	9,893
La Crosse	32,119	58.22%	22,325	40.47%	725	1.31%	9,794	17.75%	55,169
Lafayette	3,005	45.75%	3,498	53.25%	66	1.00%	−493	−7.50%	6,569
Langlade	2,958	32.74%	5,966	66.03%	111	1.23%	−3,008	−33.29%	9,035
Lincoln	5,226	38.56%	8,084	59.65%	242	1.79%	−2,858	−21.09%	13,552
Manitowoc	13,937	38.67%	21,573	59.86%	528	1.47%	−7,636	−21.19%	36,038
Marathon	25,163	40.74%	35,860	58.05%	747	1.21%	−10,697	−17.32%	61,770
Marinette	6,110	32.95%	12,164	65.61%	267	1.44%	−6,054	−32.65%	18,541
Marquette	2,697	36.75%	4,549	61.99%	92	1.25%	−1,852	−25.24%	7,338
Menominee	979	78.63%	254	20.40%	12	0.96%	725	58.23%	1,245
Milwaukee	246,073	70.94%	97,471	28.10%	3,345	0.96%	148,602	42.84%	346,889
Monroe	6,931	39.97%	10,153	58.55%	257	1.48%	−3,222	−18.58%	17,341
Oconto	5,910	30.25%	13,363	68.40%	264	1.35%	−7,453	−38.15%	19,537
Oneida	8,667	42.84%	11,297	55.84%	266	1.31%	−2,630	−13.00%	20,230
Outagamie	39,572	45.96%	45,601	52.96%	929	1.08%	−6,029	−7.00%	86,102
Ozaukee	23,104	44.12%	28,827	55.05%	436	0.83%	−5,723	−10.93%	52,367
Pepin	1,280	38.66%	1,990	60.10%	41	1.24%	−710	−21.44%	3,311
Pierce	7,967	44.19%	9,779	54.24%	283	1.57%	−1,812	−10.05%	18,029
Polk	7,587	37.11%	12,548	61.37%	310	1.52%	−4,961	−24.27%	20,445
Portage	17,947	53.29%	15,361	45.61%	373	1.11%	2,586	7.68%	33,681
Price	2,596	36.76%	4,369	61.87%	97	1.37%	−1,773	−25.11%	7,062
Racine	38,241	46.91%	42,359	51.96%	928	1.14%	−4,118	−5.05%	81,528
Richland	3,354	47.86%	3,562	50.83%	92	1.31%	−208	−2.97%	7,008
Rock	37,755	57.84%	26,722	40.94%	799	1.22%	11,033	16.90%	65,276
Rusk	2,180	34.13%	4,120	64.51%	87	1.36%	−1,940	−30.37%	6,387
Sauk	15,285	52.78%	13,348	46.09%	327	1.13%	1,937	6.69%	28,960
Sawyer	3,734	43.59%	4,735	55.28%	97	1.13%	−1,001	−11.69%	8,566
Shawano	5,853	32.63%	11,875	66.20%	209	1.17%	−6,022	−33.57%	17,937
Sheboygan	22,325	41.60%	30,679	57.17%	657	1.22%	−8,354	−15.57%	53,661
St. Croix	18,516	42.04%	24,968	56.70%	555	1.26%	−6,452	−14.65%	44,039
Taylor	2,262	25.99%	6,296	72.35%	144	1.65%	−4,034	−46.36%	8,702
Trempealeau	5,281	43.11%	6,813	55.62%	155	1.27%	−1,532	−12.51%	12,249
Vernon	6,597	49.97%	6,409	48.55%	195	1.48%	188	1.42%	13,201
Vilas	5,088	38.49%	7,983	60.39%	149	1.13%	−2,895	−21.90%	13,220
Walworth	18,569	40.43%	26,700	58.14%	657	1.43%	−8,131	−17.70%	45,926
Washburn	3,198	38.29%	5,032	60.26%	121	1.45%	−1,834	−21.96%	8,351
Washington	22,698	30.66%	50,749	68.55%	582	0.79%	−28,051	−37.89%	74,029
Waukesha	88,564	39.43%	134,212	59.76%	1,827	0.81%	−45,648	−20.32%	224,603
Waupaca	7,990	34.40%	14,939	64.32%	298	1.28%	−6,949	−29.92%	23,227
Waushara	3,766	33.21%	7,459	65.78%	115	1.01%	−3,693	−32.57%	11,340
Winnebago	36,512	48.87%	37,242	49.85%	958	1.28%	−730	−0.98%	74,712
Wood	13,624	41.29%	18,865	57.18%	503	1.52%	−5,241	−15.89%	32,992
Totals	1,358,774	51.15%	1,268,535	47.75%	29,181	1.10%	90,239	3.40%	2,656,490

Counties that flipped from Democratic to Republican

- Crawford (largest municipality: Prairie du Chien)
- Grant (largest municipality: Platteville)
- Kenosha (largest municipality: Kenosha)
- Richland (largest municipality: Richland Center)

Counties that flipped from Republican to Democratic

- Door (largest municipality: Sturgeon Bay)

==== By congressional district ====
Despite losing, Michels won five of eight congressional districts. Evers won three of eight congressional districts, including one that elected a Republican.

District	Evers	Michels	Representative
1st	49.3%	49.5%	Bryan Steil
2nd	73%	26%	Mark Pocan
3rd	50%	49%	Ron Kind (117th Congress)
3rd	50%	49%	Derrick Van Orden (118th Congress)
4th	77%	21%	Gwen Moore
5th	39%	61%	Scott L. Fitzgerald
6th	42%	57%	Glenn Grothman
7th	40%	58%	Tom Tiffany
8th	43%	56%	Mike Gallagher

== See also ==
- 2022 United States gubernatorial elections
- 2022 Wisconsin elections

== Notes ==
Partisan clients
