= 2024 Wisconsin Senate election =

- November 5, 2024

16 of 33 seats in the Wisconsin Senate 17 seats needed for a majority
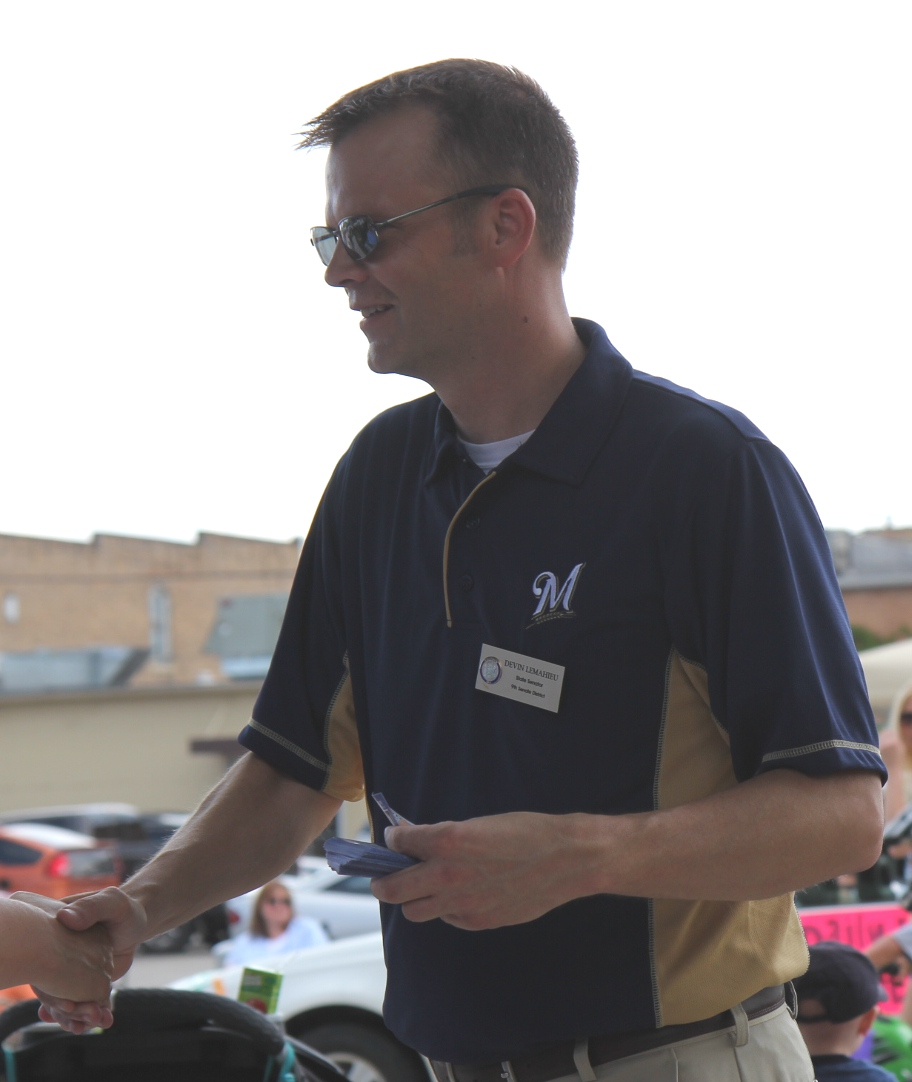

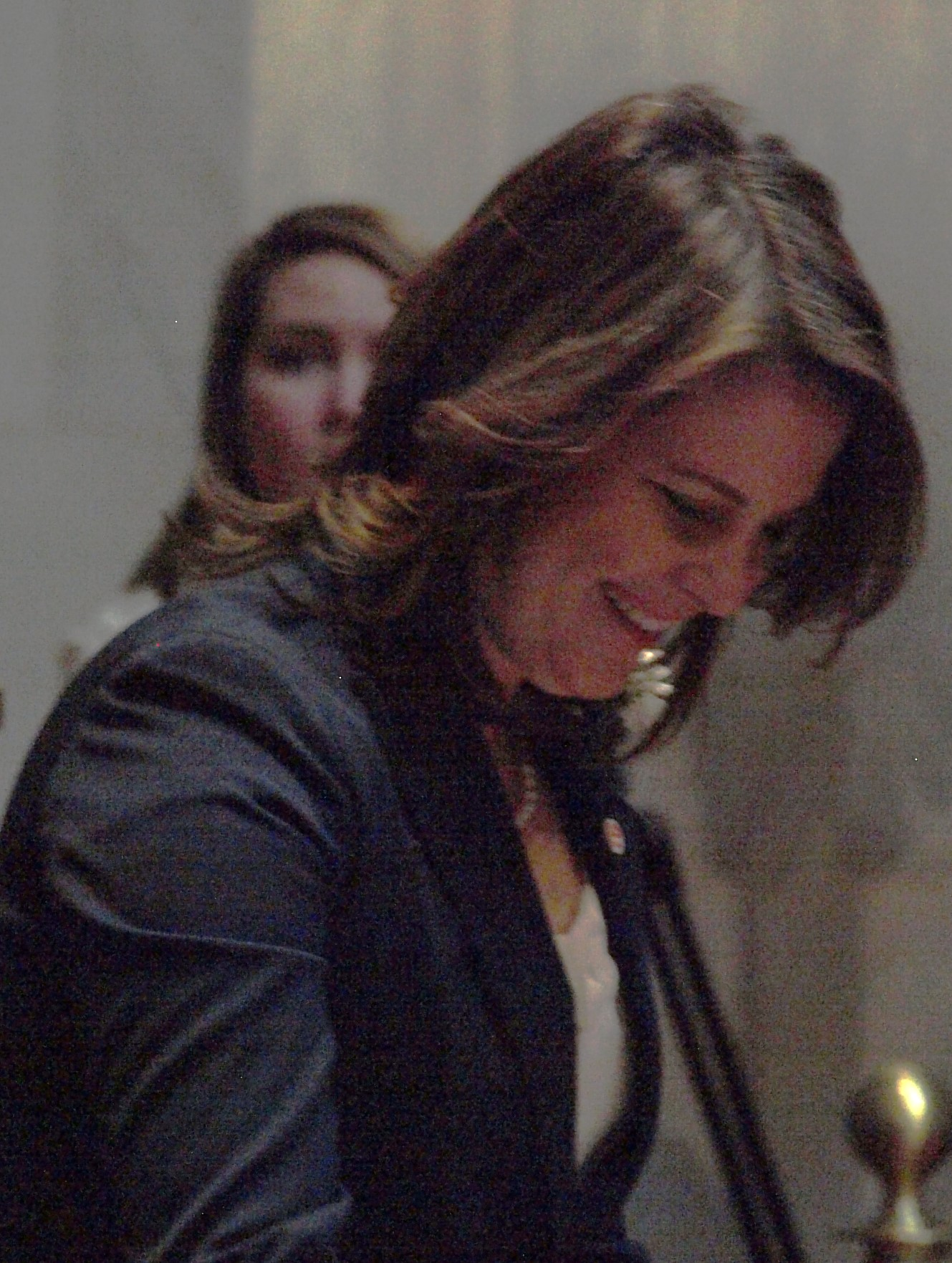
	Majority party	Minority party
Leader	Devin LeMahieu	Dianne Hesselbein
Party	Republican	Democratic
Leader since	January 4, 2021	December 1, 2023
Leader's seat	9th–Oostburg	27th–Middleton
Last election	12 seats, 61.1%	5 seats, 37.68%
Seats before	22	11
Seats won	6	10
Seats after	18	15
Seat change	▼4	▲4
Popular vote	650,328	861,272
Percentage	42.74%	56.60%
Swing	▼18.36 pp	▲18.92 pp
- Republican hold Democratic hold Democratic gain No election Republican: 50–60% 60–70% Democratic: 50–60% >90%
President before election
Chris Kapenga
Republican
Elected President
Mary Felzkowski
Republican

The 2024 Wisconsin Senate election was held on Tuesday, November 5, 2024, at the Fall general election in Wisconsin, alongside the election for the State Assembly. Sixteen of the 33 seats in the Wisconsin Senate were up for election—the even-numbered districts. Before the election, 22 Senate seats were held by Republicans, 11 seats were held by Democrats. The primary election was held on August 13, 2024, and the filing deadline to appear on the ballot was June 3, 2024.

This was the first Wisconsin Senate election after the 2024 redistricting. Democrats won all five of the most competitive Senate races, flipping four Republican-held seats. Republicans maintained their majority, with Democrats breaking their two-thirds supermajority in the chamber.

After the elections, Republicans entered the 107th Wisconsin Legislature with 18 of 33 seats.

== Background ==
=== Redistricting ===
This election was significantly affected by the legislative maps drawn as a result of the Wisconsin Supreme Court decision in Clarke v. Wisconsin Elections Commission, which declared the previous legislative district map to be unconstitutional on December 22, 2023. The court was in the process of selecting a remedial plan, when the legislature chose to embrace the remedial map proposal from Governor Tony Evers. Evers signed the plan into law on February 19, 2024.

Under the new maps, Democrats were expected to gain seats in the Senate, but they were not expected to be able to win a majority because only even-numbered seats were up for election in 2024. Five of the sixteen seats up for election had no incumbents due to the shifting legislative boundaries. Both parties spent heavily on the competitive races in this cycle.

Democrats last won a majority of seats in the state senate in the 2012 recall elections, but they last seated a majority of seats in the session following the 2008 elections.

=== PFAS Legislation ===
To combat the threat of PFAS contamination, the Wisconsin legislature included $125 million in the state budget. Despite this, Republicans on the Joint Finance Committee (JFC) have refused to release the funds to be used by the Wisconsin Department of Natural Resources (DNR). On April 9, Evers vetoed a piece of legislation which would have created grants to fight pollution due to PFAS chemicals, in explaining his veto, Evers cited the restrictions the legislation would have placed on the DNR to prosecute polluters. Evers also continued calling for the release of the $125 million which was set aside in the budget for combatting PFAS contamination. In response to Evers' veto, JFC members said they would hold the funds hostage.

On April 16, Evers called the JFC to session, but its Republican members refused to attend, denying the committee a quorum to do business. In response to this inaction, Wisconsin Democrats launched a six-figures campaign called "No More Games" which served the purpose to pressure and target members of the Committee from competitive districts. Among their targets were Senate Republicans Joan Ballweg, Howard Marklein, Duey Stroebel, and Eric Wimberger, from the 14th, 17th, 20th and 30th districts respectively.

== Results summary ==
		Party (majority caucus shading)		Total
		Democratic	Republican	Total
Last election (2022)		5	12	17
Total after last election (2022)		11	22	33
Total before this election		11	22	33
Up for election		6	10	16
of which:	Incumbent retiring	1	2	3
of which:	Vacated	1	0	1
of which:	Open	1	3	4
of which:	Unopposed	5	0	5
This election		10	6	16
Change from last election		▲4	▼4	
Total after this election		15	18	33
Change in total		▲4	▼4	

Party	Candidates	Votes	
Party	Candidates	No.	%
Democratic	16	861,272	56.60%
Republican	11	650,328	42.74%
Write-in	–	10,049	0.66%
Total		1,521,649	100.0%

=== Close races ===
Seats where the margin of victory was under 10%:

1. State Senate district 8, 1.5% (gain)
2. State Senate district 14, 2.28% (gain)
3. State Senate district 32, 4.68%
4. State Senate district 30, 5.08% (gain)
5. State Senate district 18, 6.59% (gain)

== Outgoing incumbents ==
=== Retiring ===
- Robert Cowles (R–Green Bay), representing district 2 since 1987, retired.

=== Seeking other office ===
- Melissa Agard (D–Madison), representing district 16 since 2021, retired to run for Dane County executive.
- Dan Knodl (R–Germantown), representing district 8 since 2023, ran for Wisconsin State Assembly in Wisconsin's 24th Assembly district.

=== Vacated ===
- Lena Taylor (D–Milwaukee), representing district 4 since 2005, resigned on January 26, 2024, after her appointment as a Wisconsin circuit court judge in Milwaukee County and was replaced by Dora Drake following a special election on July 30, 2024.

=== Lost re-election ===
- Joan Ballweg (R–Markesan), representing district 14 since 2021, lost reelection to Sarah Keyeski (D–Lodi)
- Duey Stroebel (R–Saukville), representing the 20th district since 2017, lost reelection to Jodi Habush Sinykin (D–Whitefish Bay) in the 8th district

== Special elections ==
There was one special election scheduled in 2024 for the Wisconsin state Senate.

Dist.	2020 Pres.	Previous Incumbent				This Election	
Dist.	2020 Pres.	Senator	Party	First elected	Status	Candidate(s)	Results
04	D+69.2	Lena Taylor	Dem.	2004	Incumbent resigned on January 26, 2024. New member elected on July 30, 2024.	▌Dora Drake (Dem.) 96.57%	New member elected Democratic hold

=== District 4 ===
Precinct results: Drake—50–60% Drake—60–70% Drake—70–80% Drake—80–90% Myers—40–50% Myers—50–60% Myers—60–70% Myers—70–80% Tied—50%

Incumbent Democrat Lena Taylor was appointed a judge to the Wisconsin circuit court. State representatives Dora Drake and LaKeshia Myers ran to succeed her. In the primary Drake defeated Myers by a wide margin. Drake was elected to finish Taylor's term unopposed.

District 4 Special Democratic primary
Party	Candidate	Votes	%
Democratic	Dora Drake	4,439	65.75
Democratic	LaKeshia Myers	2,298	34.04
Write-in		14	0.21
Total votes		6,751	100.0

District 4 general election
Party	Candidate	Votes	%
Democratic	Dora Drake	4,843	96.57
Write-in		172	3.43
Total votes		5,015	100.0

== Predictions ==
Source	Ranking	As of
CNalysis	Solid R	October 29, 2024
Sabato's Crystal Ball	Likely R	October 23, 2024

== Race summary ==
Dist.	2020 Pres.	Incumbent			This election	
Dist.	2020 Pres.	Member	Party	First elected	Status	Candidates
02	R+26.5	Robert Cowles (Redistricted into the 30th district)	Rep.	1987 (special)	Incumbent retired New member elected. Republican hold.	▌ ✓ Eric Wimberger (Rep.) 64.46%; ▌Kelly Peterson (Dem.) 35.49%
04	D+68.4	Dora Drake	Dem.	2024 (special)	Incumbent re-elected.	▌ ✓ Dora Drake (Dem.) 98.45%
06	D+71.2	LaTonya Johnson	Dem.	2016	Incumbent re-elected.	▌ ✓ La Tonya Johnson (Dem.) 98.51%
08	D+0.6	Dan Knodl	Rep.	2023 (special)	Ran for the 24th state assembly district.	▌ ✓ Jodi Habush Sinykin (Dem.) 50.68%; ▌Duey Stroebel (Rep.) 49.18%
08	D+0.6	Duey Stroebel (Redistricted from the 20th district)	Rep.	2015 (special)	Incumbent lost re-election. Democratic gain.	▌ ✓ Jodi Habush Sinykin (Dem.) 50.68%; ▌Duey Stroebel (Rep.) 49.18%
10	R+17.1	Rob Stafsholt	Rep.	2020	Incumbent re-elected.	▌ ✓ Rob Stafsholt (Rep.) 62.35%; ▌Paul W. Hambleton (Dem.) 37.57%
12	R+25.6	Mary Felzkowski	Rep.	2020	Incumbent re-elected.	▌ ✓ Mary Felzkowski (Rep.) 67.46%; ▌Andi Rich (Dem.) 32.41%
14	D+4	Joan Ballweg (Redistricted into the 17th district)	Rep.	2020	Incumbent lost reelection. New member elected. Democratic gain.	▌ ✓ Sarah Keyeski (Dem.) 51.09%; ▌Joan Ballweg (Rep.) 48.81%
16	D+35.3	Melissa Agard (Redistricted into the 26th district)	Dem.	2020	Incumbent retired. New member elected. Democratic hold.	▌ ✓ Melissa Ratcliff (Dem.) 97.23%
18	D+8.5	None (open seat)			No incumbent. New member elected. Democratic gain.	▌ ✓ Kristin Alfheim (Dem.) 53.25%; ▌Anthony Phillips (Rep.) 46.66%
20	R+34.8	Dan Feyen (Redistricted from the 18th district)	Rep.	2016	Incumbent re-elected.	▌ ✓ Dan Feyen (Rep.) 69.99%; ▌Michael T. Rapp (Dem.) 29.91%
22	D+10.3	Robert Wirch	Dem.	1996	Incumbent re-elected.	▌ ✓ Robert Wirch (Dem.) 95.29%
24	R+11.6	Patrick Testin	Rep.	2016	Incumbent re-elected.	▌ ✓ Patrick Testin (Rep.) 58.67%; ▌Collin McNamara (Dem.) 41.28%
26	D+71.8	Kelda Roys	Dem.	2020	Incumbent re-elected.	▌ ✓ Kelda Roys (Dem.) 98.41%
28	R+22.2	Julian Bradley (Redistricted into the 21st district)	Rep.	2020	Incumbent re-elected.	▌ ✓ Julian Bradley (Rep.) 63.09%; ▌Megan Lach (Dem.) 36.82%
30	D+3.2	Eric Wimberger	Rep.	2020	Ran for the 2nd district New member elected. Democratic gain.	▌ ✓ Jamie Wall (Dem.) 52.49%; ▌Jim Rafter (Rep.) 47.41%
32	D+10.7	Brad Pfaff	Dem.	2020	Incumbent re-elected.	▌ ✓ Brad Pfaff (Dem.) 52.33%; ▌Stacey Klein (Rep.) 47.65%

== Detailed results ==
=== District 2 ===
Incumbent Republican Robert Cowles, then the longest currently-serving Wisconsin legislator, declined to seek re-election. Following redistricting, fellow Republican Eric Wimberger decided to move to this district to avoid a competitive election in the 30th district. He avoided facing a primary against Cowles after the latter decided against seeking re-election. Wimberger defeated Democrat Kelly Peterson in the general election.

District 2 general election
Party	Candidate	Votes	%
Republican	Eric Wimberger	67,979	64.46
Democratic	Kelly Peterson	37,430	35.49
Write-in		50	0.05
Total votes		105,459	100.0

=== District 4 ===
Precinct results: Drake—50–60% Drake—60–70% Drake—70–80% Myers—50–60% Myers—60–70% Tied—50%

Incumbent Democrat Dora Drake ran for re-election unopposed. In the primary she defeated state representative LaKeshia Myers in a rematch from the special election primary earlier in 2024.

District 4 Democratic primary
Party	Candidate	Votes	%
Democratic	Dora Drake (incumbent)	12,630	62.35
Democratic	LaKeshia Myers	7,605	37.54
Write-in		23	0.11
Total votes		20,258	100.0

District 4 general election
Party	Candidate	Votes	%
Democratic	Dora Drake (incumbent)	67,215	98.45
Write-in		1,061	1.55
Total votes		68,276	100.0

=== District 6 ===
Incumbent Democrat La Tonya Johnson ran for re-election unopposed.

District 6 general election
Party	Candidate	Votes	%
Democratic	La Tonya Johnson (incumbent)	69,190	98.51
Write-in		1,043	1.49
Total votes		70,233	100.0

=== District 8 ===
County results: Sinkyin—70–80% Stroebel—50–60%

Incumbent Republican Dan Knodl declined to seek re-election after redistricting put fellow Republican Duey Stroebel into his district. Stroebel faced Democrat Jodi Habush Sinykin, who was a candidate for this district in a 2023 special election. This election was highly contested, with it becoming the most expensive senate race in the state in 2024. In years past, the 8th district was strongly Republican, voting for Republicans by double digit margins, but over time the Milwaukee suburbs and surrounding communities have become more liberal due to the election of Donald Trump in 2016, which saw the 8th district give Trump around 56% of the vote. In 2020 the district gave Donald Trump around 53% of the vote. In 2023, the district was won by Knodl with less than two points. Stroebel was defeated by Sinykin in the general election by a 1,800 vote margin.

District 8 general election
Party	Candidate	Votes	%
Democratic	Jodi Habush Sinykin	60,471	50.69
Republican	Duey Stroebel	58,686	49.18
Write-in		160	0.13
Total votes		119,317	100.0

=== District 10 ===
Incmbent Republican Rob Stafsholt ran for re-election. He defeated Democrat Paul Hambleton, a former teacher and chair of the St. Croix county Democrats, in the general election.

District 10 general election
Party	Candidate	Votes	%
Republican	Rob Stafsholt (incumbent)	66,652	62.35
Democratic	Paul Hambleton	40,158	37.57
Write-in		89	0.08
Total votes		106,899	100.0

=== District 12 ===
Incumbent Republican Mary Felzkowski ran for re-election. She faced and defeated Democrat Andi Rich in the general election.

District 12 general election
Party	Candidate	Votes	%
Republican	Mary Felzkowski (incumbent)	74,162	67.46
Democratic	Andi Rich	35,628	32.41
Write-in		146	0.13
Total votes		109,936	100.0

=== District 14 ===
Incumbent Republican Joan Ballweg ran for re-election after being drawn out of this district due to redistricting. Democrat and mental health counselor Sarah Keyeski announced a campaign to face the state senator. Despite having initially announced a campaign against Republican representative Jon Plumer, Keyeski switched to a state senate bid following redistricting, which saw the 14th senate district redrawn, shedding most of its territory north of Columbia county and shifting further south and west, to include parts of Dane county, as well as all of Sauk and Richland counties. As part of her re-election campaign, Ballweg cast herself as a bipartisan legislator, citing a Legislative Reference Bureau memo showing she had cast the most votes with Democrats of any Republican legislator, as well as pieces of legislation she authored which had been signed by governors from both parties. Additionally, Ballweg had broken with her caucus to vote against a bill to regulate transgender students involvement in sports.

During her campaign, Keyeski cited her first-time candidacy and mental health background as supporting factors of her candidacy. On policy, she centered her message around abortion rights, and had criticized Ballweg for her record on the issue, as she had voted against exceptions for rape or incest as well as against reinforcing access to contraception and in-vitro fertilization. Additionally, Keyeski campaigned on addressing the causes of mental health issues, as well as funding education, rural development, and childcare, with a proposal to fund free universal school lunch. Ballweg's campaign also ran ads criticizing Keyeski for proposals to raise property taxes, while trying to tie her campaign to national Democrats on issues like immigration. The two candidates cited similar support for helping families, with Keyeski wanting to fund free school lunches for students, and Ballweg wanting to expand Badgercare. In the general election she was defeated by Democrat and mental health counselor Sarah Keyeski by a three-point margin.

District 14 general election
Party	Candidate	Votes	%
Democratic	Sarah Keyeski	52,483	51.09
Republican	Joan Ballweg (incumbent)	50,132	48.81
Write-in		101	0.10
Total votes		102,733	100.0

=== District 16 ===
Incumbent Democrat Melissa Agard declined to seek re-election, leaving the seat open. Following Agard's declaration, Democratic representatives Jimmy Anderson, Melissa Ratcliff, and Samba Baldeh; of the 47th, 46th, and 48th assembly districts respectively, all filed to succeed her. All three ran on similar platforms, including expanding Medicaid access and enshrining abortion rights. To differentiate themselves, the three emphasized their different experiences, voter coalitions, and endorsements; with Anderson emphasizing his fight for disability rights in the Wisconsin legislature, Ratcliff emphasizing her support for the LGBTQ+ community, and Baldeh cited his personal experiences as a black, Muslim immigrant to the United States. Ratcliff defeated Anderson and Baldeh by a wide margin and was unopposed in the general election.

District 16 Democratic primary
Party	Candidate	Votes	%
Democratic	Melissa Ratcliff	17,205	52.04
Democratic	Jimmy Anderson	10,258	31.03
Democratic	Samba Baldeh	5,575	16.86
Write-in		25	0.07
Total votes		33,063	100.0

District 16 general election
Party	Candidate	Votes	%
Democratic	Melissa Ratcliff	82,828	97.23
Write-in		2,361	2.77
Total votes		85,189	100.0

=== District 18 ===
Incumbent Republican Dan Feyen was moved into the 20th district due to redistricting, leaving the district open. After Feyen was moved, two Republicans filed to succeed him, physician Anthony Phillips and restaurant owner Blong Yang. During the primary Phillips campaigned as a center right Republican, supporting a standard set of Republican policies such as increased police funding, low taxes on income and property, and giving parents further oversight of their children's education. Yang in his campaign ran to the right of Phillips, and opposed recognizing transgender people. Yang, who is Hmong, attempted to use his race to attack Kristin Alfheim, a member of the Appleton Common Council and the only Democrat to file for the race. Phillips ultimately defeated Yang by a margin of 25 points. Alfheim went on to defeat Phillips in the election by a seven-point margin.

District 18 Republican primary
Party	Candidate	Votes	%
Republican	Anthony Phillips	8,611	62.17
Republican	Blong Yang	5,226	37.73
Write-in		13	0.10
Total votes		13,850	100.0

District 18 general election
Party	Candidate	Votes	%
Democratic	Kristin Alfheim	46,878	53.25
Republican	Anthony Phillips	41,079	46.66
Write-in		75	0.09
Total votes		88,032	100.0

=== District 20 ===
Incumbent Republican Duey Stroebel was drawn into the 8th district as a result of redistricting, while Dan Feyen was drawn into this district from the 18th due to redistricting. One other Republican filed to run against Feyen, former Republican representative and election denier Timothy Ramthun. In the primary, Ramthun ran to the right of Feyen, supporting removing ballot drop boxes from the state and opposing incumbent Republican leadership in the state legislature, garnering the support of figures such as Mike Lindell. Feyen ran with the support of Republican legislative leadership in the legislature, gaining the endorsements of majority leader Devin LeMahieu and U.S. congressmen Glenn Grothman and Scott Fitzgerald, as well as gaining the support of the conservative PAC "Stronger Wisconsin Fund", which sent out fliers and other material in opposition to Ramthun's candidacy. Ramthun also garnered controversy during the campaign when he shared content on social media which threatened violence against Feyen. While some Republicans feared Ramthun could defeat Feyen, Feyen defeated Ramthun by 29 points. He advanced to the general election, where he defeated Democrat Michael Rapp by a 40-point margin.

District 20 Republican primary
Party	Candidate	Votes	%
Republican	Dan Feyen	17,243	64.29
Republican	Timothy Ramthun	9,543	35.59
Write-in		31	0.12
Total votes		26,817	100.0

District 20 general election
Party	Candidate	Votes	%
Republican	Dan Feyen	73,552	69.99
Democratic	Michael Rapp	31,434	29.91
Write-in		106	0.10
Total votes		105,092	100.0

=== District 22 ===
Incumbent Democrat Robert Wirch ran for re-election unopposed.

District 22 general election
Party	Candidate	Votes	%
Democratic	Robert Wirch (incumbent)	62,270	95.29
Write-in		3,077	4.71
Total votes		65,347	100.0

=== District 24 ===
County results: Testin—50–60% Testin—60–70% McNamara—50–60%

Incumbent Republican Patrick Testin ran for re-election. In the general election he faced and defeated Democrat Collin McNamara.

District 24 general election
Party	Candidate	Votes	%
Republican	Patrick Testin (incumbent)	57,695	58.67
Democratic	Collin McNamara	40,599	41.28
Write-in		47	0.05
Total votes		98,341	100.0

=== District 26 ===
Incumbent Democrat Kelda Roys ran for re-election unopposed.

District 26 general election
Party	Candidate	Votes	%
Democratic	Kelda Roys (incumbent)	94,495	98.41
Write-in		1,526	1.59
Total votes		96,021	100.0

=== District 28 ===
Incumbent Republican Julian Bradley ran for re-election after being drawn out of this district due to redistricting. In the general election he faced and defeated Democrat Megan Lach.

District 28 general election
Party	Candidate	Votes	%
Republican	Julian Bradley (incumbent)	70,543	63.09
Democratic	Megan Lach	41,170	36.82
Write-in		98	0.09
Total votes		111,811	100.0

=== District 30 ===
Precinct results: Wall—50–60% Wall—60–70% Wall—70–80% Rafter—50–60% Rafter—60–70% Tied—40–50%

Incumbent Republican Eric Wimberger declined to seek re-election in this district, instead opting to run for the neighboring 2nd district, leaving this district open. In the general election, Democrat Jamie Wall defeated Republican Jim Rafter. As a result of redistricting, the district became one of the most competitive in the Senate. During the campaign, both candidates touted their moderate credentials and desire for bipartisanship in the legislature. During the campaign, they both campaigned on tax cuts and sending some of Wisconsin's $3 billion surplus towards funding local communities. The two candidates also had their major differences, as Wall campaigned on codifying abortion rights in Wisconsin, while Rafter took a more moderate approach. Rafter also made closing the Green Bay Correctional Institution a central part of his campaign. In the general election, Wall defeated Rafter by a five-point margin.

District 30 general election
Party	Candidate	Votes	%
Democratic	Jamie Wall	46,247	52.49
Republican	Jim Rafter	41,773	47.41
Write-in		86	0.10
Total votes		88,106	100.0

=== District 32 ===
County results: Pfaff—50–60% Klein—50–60% Klein—60–70%

Incumbent Democrat Brad Pfaff ran for re-election. Republican Stacey Klein, who had previously ran for U.S. Senate, announced a campaign to face Pfaff. Klein's campaign focused on parent's rights, cutting taxes, and funding mental healthcare in the district. The two candidates took on a moderate tone during the race, with both arguing voters had more in common throughout the district than divided them. The two candidates, however, diverged on several issues, including how to spend the projected budget surplus, PFAS cleanup, and the status of BadgerCare. Klein also expressed support for the voter-ID amendment on the ballot that fall. In the general election Pfaff defeated Klein by a five-point margin.

District 32 general election
Party	Candidate	Votes	%
Democratic	Brad Pfaff (incumbent)	52,776	52.33
Republican	Stacey Klein	48,058	47.65
Write-in		23	0.02
Total votes		100,857	100.0

== See also ==
- Redistricting in Wisconsin
  - Clarke v. Wisconsin Elections Commission
- 2024 Wisconsin elections
  - 2024 Wisconsin State Assembly election
- 2024 United States elections
- Elections in Wisconsin
- Wisconsin Senate
