= Patrick Testin =

21st century American politician

Pat Testin
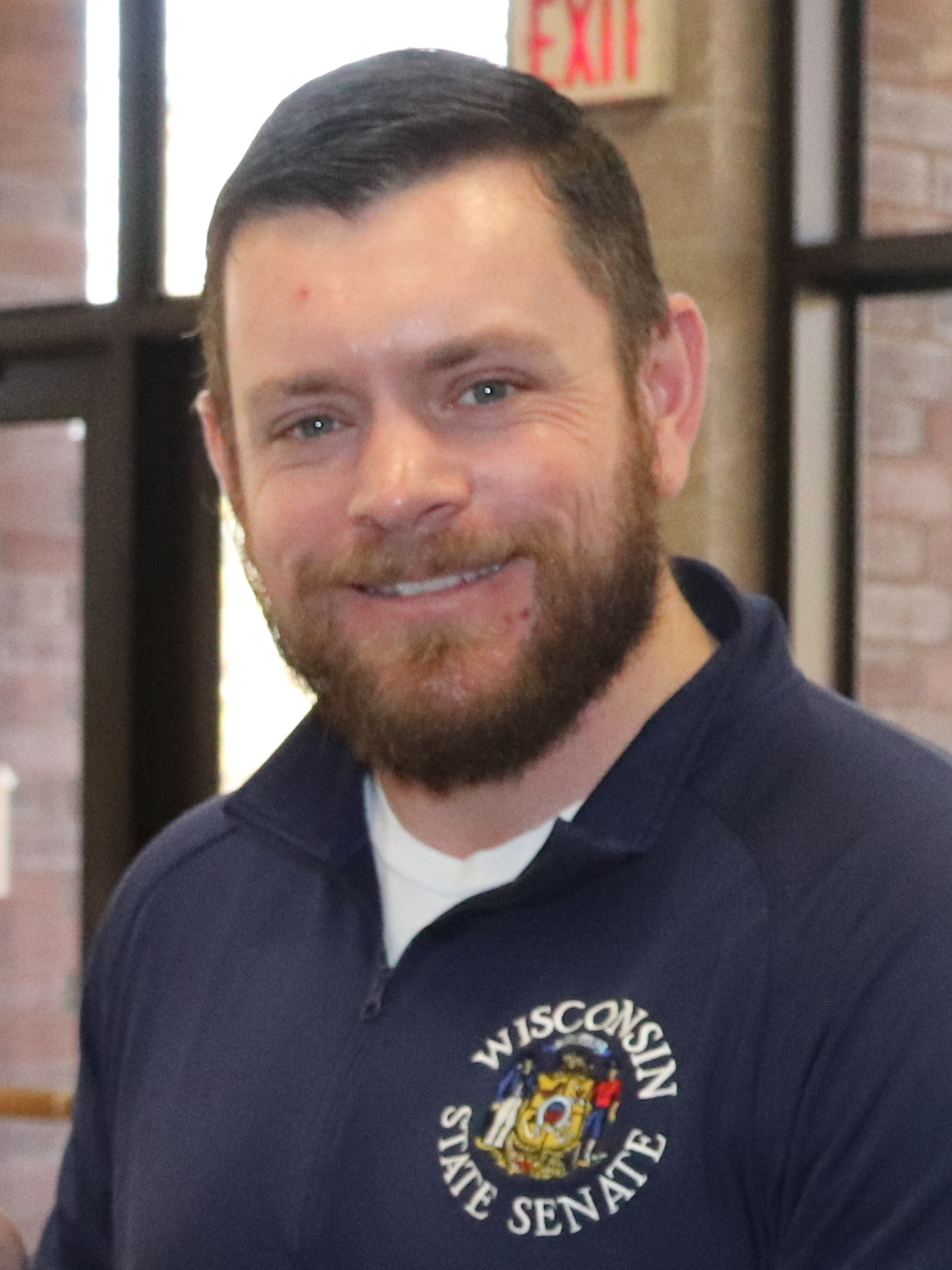

President pro tempore of the Wisconsin Senate
- Incumbent
- Assumed office January 4, 2021
- Preceded by: Howard Marklein

Member of the Wisconsin Senate from the 24th district
- Incumbent
- Assumed office January 3, 2017
- Preceded by: Julie Lassa

Personal details
- Born: June 9, 1988 (age 38) Madison, Wisconsin, U.S.
- Party: Republican
- Spouse: Hannah Henderson (m. 2017)
- Education: University of Wisconsin, Stevens Point (BS)
- Website: State Senate website

Patrick Testin (born June 9, 1988) is an American Republican politician from Stevens Point, Wisconsin. He is the current president pro tempore of the Wisconsin Senate, since 2021, and has served in the Senate since 2017. He represents Wisconsin's 24th Senate district, which includes the cities of Stevens Point and Wisconsin Rapids in central Wisconsin.

== Biography ==
Born in Madison, Wisconsin, Testin graduated from Marinette High School in 2006. He continued his education at the University of Wisconsin–Stevens Point, where he earned his bachelor's degree in political science in 2011.

While in college, Testin became actively involved with the Republican Party of Wisconsin and served as a deputy field director for the successful congressional campaign of Sean Duffy. A few months later, he was hired as field director for Republican candidate Kim Simac in the 2011 Wisconsin Senate recall elections. Over the next several years, after graduating from college, Testin was primarily employed as a store manager for a mattress retailer (2011–2014), and then as a sales representative for M Shiraz Wines of Wisconsin (since 2014).

In 2012, following the implementation of the 2011 Republican redistricting plan, he made his first bid for elected office, running for Wisconsin State Assembly in the open 71st Assembly district—based in Stevens Point, Plover, and neighboring parts of Portage County. He fell far short of fellow first-time candidate Katrina Shankland, who carried 60% of the general election vote.

In 2016, Testin was again a candidate for office, challenging 13-year incumbent State Senator Julie Lassa. This time he prevailed, taking 52% of the vote in a year when the Republican presidential candidate carried the state for the first time since 1984. He was subsequently reelected in 2020. Following the 2020 election, the Senate Republican caucus elected him President pro tempore for the 2021–2022 session.

In September 2021, Testin announced his candidacy for Lieutenant Governor of Wisconsin in the 2022 election. He lost the Republican primary to fellow state senator Roger Roth.

== Electoral history ==
=== Wisconsin Assembly (2012) ===
Year	Election	Date	Elected				Defeated				Total	Plurality
2012	General	Nov. 6	Katrina Shankland	Democratic	17,619	60.82%	Patrick Testin	Rep.	11,279	38.94%	28,968	6,340

=== Wisconsin Senate (2016–present) ===
Year	Election	Date	Elected				Defeated				Total	Plurality
2016	General	Nov. 8	Patrick Testin	Republican	45,139	52.32%	Julie Lassa (inc)	Dem.	41,091	47.63%	86,275	4,048
2020	General	Nov. 3	Patrick Testin (inc)	Republican	53,720	56.43%	Paul Piotrowski	Dem.	41,419	43.51%	95,198	12,301
2024	General	Nov. 5	Patrick Testin (inc)	Republican	57,695	58.67%	Collin McNamara	Dem.	40,599	41.28%	98,341	17,096

=== Wisconsin Lieutenant Governor (2022) ===
Year	Election	Date	Elected				Defeated				Total	Plurality
2022	Primary	Aug. 14	Roger Roth	Republican	178,972	30.08%	Patrick Testin	Rep.	109,374	18.38%	595,001	69,598
2022	Primary	Aug. 14	Roger Roth	Republican	178,972	30.08%	Cindy Werner	Rep.	80,953	13.61%	595,001	69,598
2022	Primary	Aug. 14	Roger Roth	Republican	178,972	30.08%	Jonathan Wichmann	Rep.	79,166	13.31%	595,001	69,598
2022	Primary	Aug. 14	Roger Roth	Republican	178,972	30.08%	Will Martin	Rep.	54,790	9.21%	595,001	69,598
2022	Primary	Aug. 14	Roger Roth	Republican	178,972	30.08%	Kyle Yudes	Rep.	32,051	5.39%	595,001	69,598
2022	Primary	Aug. 14	Roger Roth	Republican	178,972	30.08%	David C. Varnam	Rep.	30,640	5.15%	595,001	69,598
2022	Primary	Aug. 14	Roger Roth	Republican	178,972	30.08%	David D. King	Rep.	27,443	4.61%	595,001	69,598

Wisconsin Senate
Preceded by Howard Marklein	President pro tempore of the Wisconsin Senate; 2021–present	Incumbent
