= Sarah Keyeski =

21st century American politician (born 1970)

Member of the Wisconsin Senate from the 14th district
- Incumbent
- Assumed office January 6, 2025
- Preceded by: Joan Ballweg

Personal details
- Born: Sarah Everson; October 25, 1970 (age 55) La Crosse, Wisconsin, U.S.
- Party: Democratic
- Spouse: Rodney Keyeski
- Children: 6
- Education: Luther College; Northwestern University
- Profession: Mental health counselor
- Website: Official website; Campaign website

Sarah Keyeski (née Everson; born October 25, 1970) is an American mental health counselor and Democratic politician from Columbia County, Wisconsin. She is a member of the Wisconsin Senate, representing Wisconsin's 14th Senate district since 2025.

== Biography ==
Sarah Keyeski was born Sarah Everson, at La Crosse, Wisconsin, in October 1970. She was raised on her family's farm near Cashton, Wisconsin, in neighboring Monroe County. After graduating from high school, she earned her bachelor's degree from Luther College in Iowa. She went on to obtain her master's degree from Northwestern University in Illinois, and was then certified as a Licensed Professional Counselor.

She returned to Wisconsin and worked as a mental health counselor in Sun Prairie, Wisconsin, for more than a decade. In 2017, she moved to a home just outside the city of Lodi, Wisconsin, in Columbia County, where she opened a private counseling practice the following year.

Seeing the mental health consequences of the COVID-19 pandemic, Keyeski founded the non-profit "Lift Lodi" to engage members of the community in volunteer opportunities to beautify the city and surroundings.

Keyeski decided to make her first bid for public office in 2024, after the Wisconsin Legislature adopted a dramatic redistricting plan which significantly affected her area of the state. Keyeski declared a run for Wisconsin Senate in the redrawn 14th Senate district. The redistricting had drawn 14th district state senator Joan Ballweg out of the district, but Ballweg declared her intention to relocate to maintain residency and run for re-election. Keyeski was unopposed in the Democratic primary. In the general election, the 14th Senate district was one of the most competitive races in the state. Keyeski prevailed with about 51% of the vote.

== Personal life and family ==
Sarah Everson took the last name Keyeski when she married Rodney Keyeski. They have six children together and reside in the town of Lodi, Wisconsin.

== Electoral history ==
=== Wisconsin Senate (2024) ===
Wisconsin Senate, 14th District Election, 2024
Party	Candidate	Votes	%	±%
General Election, November 5, 2024
Democratic	Sarah Keyeski	52,483	51.09%	+16.01pp
Republican	Joan Ballweg (incumbent)	50,132	48.81%	−16.06pp
	Scattering	101	0.10%	
Plurality		2,334	2.27%	-27.53pp
Total votes		102,733	100.0%	+7.70%
Democratic gain from Republican				

Wisconsin State Assembly
Preceded by Joan Ballweg	Member of the Wisconsin Senate from the 14th district January 6, 2025 – present	Incumbent
