= Edward Brooks (Wisconsin politician) =

American politician (1942–2019)

Member of the Wisconsin State Assembly from the 50th district
- In office January 5, 2009 – January 7, 2019
- Preceded by: Sheryl Albers
- Succeeded by: Tony Kurtz

Personal details
- Born: July 1, 1942 Baraboo, Wisconsin, U.S.
- Died: April 23, 2019 (aged 76)
- Resting place: Saint Johns Cemetery; Rock Springs, Wisconsin
- Party: Republican
- Spouse: Barbara Wolfgram
- Children: 3
- Education: University of Wisconsin–Madison

Edward A. Brooks (July 1, 1942 – April 23, 2019) was an American politician and farmer from the state of Wisconsin. He served ten years in the Wisconsin State Assembly, representing Juneau County and parts of northern Richland and Sauk counties.

== Background ==
Brooks was born in Baraboo, Wisconsin, and attended Webb High School in Reedsburg, Wisconsin. He served in the United States Army Reserve. Brooks has received his bachelor's degree in agricultural economics, in 1985, from the University of Wisconsin–Madison. Brooks served on the Reedsburg Town Board and served as chair of the town board. Brooks served in the Wisconsin State Assembly from 2008 to 2019 and was a Republican. Brooks died from leukemia on April 23, 2019.

== Wisconsin Legislature ==
Brooks served on the Wisconsin Assembly agriculture and criminal justice legislative committees. He also served on the urban and local affairs legislative committee and served as the chair of the committee.
