= Alex Dallman =

American politician (born 1992)

Member of the Wisconsin State Assembly
- Incumbent
- Assumed office January 6, 2025
- Preceded by: Mark Born
- Constituency: 39th district
- In office January 4, 2021 – January 6, 2025
- Preceded by: Joan Ballweg
- Succeeded by: Tony Kurtz
- Constituency: 41st district

Personal details
- Born: May 22, 1992 (age 34) Markesan, Wisconsin, U.S.
- Party: Republican
- Spouse: Not married
- Education: Edgewood College (BS)
- Profession: politician
- Website: Campaign website

Alex A. Dallman (born May 22, 1992) is an American Republican politician from Green Lake County, Wisconsin. He is a member of the Wisconsin State Assembly, representing Wisconsin's 39th Assembly district since 2025; he previously represented the 41st Assembly district from 2021 to 2025.

== Early life and education ==
Born in Markesan, Wisconsin, Dallman is a graduate of Markesan High School. He attended Edgewood College, in Madison, Wisconsin, and received his bachelor's degree in political science.

== Political career ==
Dallman began his career working constituent services in the office of Wisconsin congressman Glenn Grothman and still works as an outreach representative for the congressman. He has been chairman of the Green Lake County Republican Party since 2018.

In February 2020, incumbent 41st district assemblymember Joan Ballweg announced she would forego reelection to the Assembly and would instead seek election to the Wisconsin State Senate in 2020. Just days later, Dallman announced he would run for the Republican nomination to replace Ballweg in the Wisconsin State Assembly. Dallman, who faced three opponents in the Republican primary, received the endorsement of former Republican Governor Scott Walker in the days just before the primary. He prevailed with nearly 50% of the primary vote. He went on to defeat Democrat Nate Zimdars and independent Jean Bartz in the general election with 60% of the vote.

== Personal life and family ==
Dallman resides in the city of Markesan, Wisconsin. He is a member of the Green Lake County Farm Bureau and the Manchester Rod & Gun Club.

== Electoral history ==
=== Wisconsin Assembly (2020) ===
Wisconsin Assembly, 41st District Election, 2020
Party	Candidate	Votes	%	±%
Republican Primary, August 11, 2020
Republican	Alex A. Dallman	3,411	49.31%	
Republican	Gary A. Will	1,400	20.24%	
Republican	Luke Dretske	1,125	16.26%	
Republican	Chuck Harsh	973	14.07%	
	Scattering	8	0.12%	
Plurality		2,011	29.07%	
Total votes		6,917	100.0%	
General Election, November 3, 2020
Republican	Alex A. Dallman	18,604	60.55%	−2.37%
Democratic	Nate Zimdars	10,428	33.94%	−3.11%
Independent	Jean Bartz	1,680	5.47%	
	Scattering	12	0.04%	
Plurality		8,176	26.61%	+0.74%
Total votes		30,724	100.0%	+26.70%
Republican hold				

Wisconsin State Assembly
Preceded by Joan Ballweg	Member of the Wisconsin State Assembly from the 41st district January 4, 2021 – January 6, 2025	Succeeded by Tony Kurtz
Preceded by Mark Born	Member of the Wisconsin State Assembly from the 39th district January 6, 2025 – present	Incumbent
