= Joan Ballweg =

21st century American politician

- Ballweg in 2007

Member of the Wisconsin Senate from the 14th district
- In office January 4, 2021 – January 6, 2025
- Preceded by: Luther Olsen
- Succeeded by: Sarah Keyeski

Member of the Wisconsin State Assembly from the 41st district
- In office January 3, 2005 – January 4, 2021
- Preceded by: Luther Olsen
- Succeeded by: Alex Dallman

Mayor of Markesan, Wisconsin
- In office April 1991 – April 1997

Personal details
- Born: March 16, 1952 (age 74) Milwaukee, Wisconsin, U.S.
- Party: Republican
- Spouse: Thomas Ballweg (m. 1974)
- Children: Jeffrey, Kristen, Becky
- Education: University of Wisconsin–Stevens Point (BA)
- Profession: Teacher, business owner, politician
- Website: Official website

Joan A. Ballweg (née Gottinger; born March 16, 1952) is an American business owner and Republican politician from Green Lake County, Wisconsin. She served four years as a member of the Wisconsin Senate, representing the 14th Senate district from 2021 to 2025. She previously served eight terms in the Wisconsin State Assembly, from 2005 to 2021, and was mayor of Markesan, Wisconsin, from 1991 to 1997.

== Early life and education ==
Joan Ballweg was born Joan Gottinger in Milwaukee, Wisconsin, and raised in the Milwaukee suburb West Allis. She graduated from Nathan Hale High School in West Allis in 1970 and went on to attend the University of Wisconsin–Waukesha before earning her bachelor's degree from the University of Wisconsin–Stevens Point in 1974. She is married to Tom Ballweg, with whom she has four children.

== Early career ==
Ballweg worked as a first grade teacher from 1974 to 1976 in Memphis, Tennessee, before returning to Wisconsin with her family. They settled in Waunakee, Wisconsin, before later relocating to Markesan, Wisconsin. They started the Ballweg Implement Company in December 1976. In 1986, she was elected to the Markesan city council, and served in that role until she was elected mayor of Markesan in 1991. She won re-election in 1993 and 1995, and chose not to run for a fourth term in 1997. Her most noteworthy achievement as mayor was a merger of the city fire department with that of neighboring township.

In 1998, the Ballweg company bought out another farm implement store in Waupun, Wisconsin, and made that their primary business, closing their store in Markesan. After leaving office, she also served on the board of directors of Waupun Memorial Hospital, and became chairman of the board in 2001.

== State legislature ==
In 2004, the incumbent state representative in her district, Luther Olsen, chose to run for state senate, creating an open seat in the 41st Assembly district. Ballweg entered the Republican primary in March 2004, citing her experience in education, local government, small business, and the health care industry. The race ultimately attracted a huge number of ambitious area Republicans, including the former Green Lake County sheriff, Lance Buchholtz, and Ballweg's successor as Markesan mayor, Rich Slate. Ballweg ultimately prevailed over eight Republican primary opponents, taking 28% of the primary vote. Ballweg faced only a Constitution Party opponent in the general election, and prevailed with 84% of the vote. She would win re-election seven times in the 41st Assembly district. In the Assembly, she was elected to caucus leadership in the 2011 and 2013 terms, serving as majority caucus chair. During the Trump administration, she also served as a member of the Federal Emergency Management Agency Region V advisory council.

In February 2020, state senator Luther Olsen announced he would not run for re-election later that year, creating an open seat in the 14th Senate district. Later that day, Ballweg announced that she would run to succeed him in the Wisconsin Senate. Her only opponent in the 2020 primary was newcomer Ken Van Dyke, who she defeated with 69% of the vote. She faced retired union machinist Joni Anderson in the general election, and prevailed with 65% of the vote. In the state Senate, Ballweg was again elected to leadership, serving as caucus vice chair in the 2023 term.

In 2023, the Wisconsin Supreme Court struck down the Republican legislative gerrymander and compelled the Legislature to adopt remedial maps for the 2024 elections. Ballweg was significantly affected by the redistricting, and was drawn out of the 14th Senate district. She quickly declared that she would relocate in order to maintain residency. The new 14th Senate district was significantly reorganized, the only areas of the previous district which remained were the areas of the district in Columbia and Sauk counties, and part of the area in southern Adams County; the new district added more areas of Columbia County, all of Sauk and Richland counties, and parts of southern Juneau County and north-central Dane County. In its new configuration, the 14th Senate district was projected to be one of the most competitive in the state and lived up to that expectation. Ballweg narrowly lost the election to mental health counselor Sarah Keyeski of Lodi, Wisconsin, falling about 2.2% short of Keyeski.

== Personal life ==
Joan Gottinger took the last name Ballweg when she married Tom Ballweg in 1974. They now have three adult children.

== Electoral history ==
=== Wisconsin Assembly (2004–2018) ===
Year	Election	Date	Elected				Defeated				Total	Plurality
2004	Primary	Sep. 14	Joan Ballweg	Republican	2,406	28.63%	Peter Sensenbrenner	Rep.	1,179	14.03%	8,405	1,227
2004	Primary	Sep. 14	Joan Ballweg	Republican	2,406	28.63%	Lance Buchholtz	Rep.	1,089	12.96%	8,405	1,227
2004	Primary	Sep. 14	Joan Ballweg	Republican	2,406	28.63%	Mike Gustin	Rep.	929	11.05%	8,405	1,227
2004	Primary	Sep. 14	Joan Ballweg	Republican	2,406	28.63%	Rich Slate	Rep.	860	10.23%	8,405	1,227
2004	Primary	Sep. 14	Joan Ballweg	Republican	2,406	28.63%	Dan Priske	Rep.	802	9.54%	8,405	1,227
2004	Primary	Sep. 14	Joan Ballweg	Republican	2,406	28.63%	Marv Wagner Jr.	Rep.	628	7.47%	8,405	1,227
2004	Primary	Sep. 14	Joan Ballweg	Republican	2,406	28.63%	Matt Metoxen	Rep.	374	4.45%	8,405	1,227
2004	Primary	Sep. 14	Joan Ballweg	Republican	2,406	28.63%	Leon Zuehls	Rep.	130	1.55%	8,405	1,227
2004	General	Nov. 2	Joan Ballweg	Republican	18,937	84.19%	James E. Tostenson	Con.	3,493	15.53%	22,492	15,444
2006	General	Nov. 7	Joan Ballweg (inc)	Republican	13,629	64.50%	Maura Robinson	Dem.	6,449	30.52%	21,129	7,180
2006	General	Nov. 7	Joan Ballweg (inc)	Republican	13,629	64.50%	James E. Tostenson	Con.	1,042	4.93%	21,129	7,180
2008	General	Nov. 4	Joan Ballweg (inc)	Republican	16,658	62.78%	Scott Milheiser	Dem.	9,853	37.14%	26,532	6,805
2010	Primary	Sep. 14	Joan Ballweg (inc)	Republican	6,051	73.12%	Nicholas Quade	Rep.	2,215	26.77%	8,275	3,836
2010	General	Nov. 2	Joan Ballweg (inc)	Republican	13,163	65.34%	Scott Milheiser	Dem.	5,183	25.73%	20,146	7,980
2010	General	Nov. 2	Joan Ballweg (inc)	Republican	13,163	65.34%	Jay Selthofner	Ind.	1,786	8.87%	20,146	7,980
2012	General	Nov. 6	Joan Ballweg (inc)	Republican	15,035	57.92%	Melissa Sorenson	Dem.	10,906	42.01%	25,958	4,129
2014	General	Nov. 4	Joan Ballweg (inc)	Republican	13,152	60.99%	Joe Kallas	Dem.	8,409	39.00%	21,563	4,743
2016	General	Nov. 8	Joan Ballweg (inc)	Republican	17,711	70.55%	Bradley Pearson	Dem.	7,382	29.40%	25,105	10,329
2018	General	Nov. 6	Joan Ballweg (inc)	Republican	15,257	62.92%	Frank T. Buress	Dem.	8,984	37.05%	24,249	6,273

=== Wisconsin Senate (2020, 2024) ===
Year	Election	Date	Elected				Defeated				Total	Plurality
2020	Primary	Aug. 11	Joan Ballweg	Republican	11,096	68.97%	Ken Van Dyke Sr.	Rep.	4,982	30.97%	16,088	6,114
2020	General	Nov. 3	Joan Ballweg	Republican	61,883	64.87%	Joni D. Anderson	Dem.	33,459	35.08%	95,389	28,424
2024	General	Nov. 5	Sarah Keyeski	Democratic	52,483	51.09%	Joan Ballweg (inc)	Rep.	50,149	48.81%	102,733	2,334

Wisconsin State Assembly
Preceded by Luther Olsen	Member of the Wisconsin State Assembly from the 41st district January 3, 2005 – January 4, 2021	Succeeded by Alex Dallman
Wisconsin Senate
Preceded by Luther Olsen	Member of the Wisconsin Senate from the 14th district January 4, 2021 – January 6, 2025	Succeeded by Sarah Keyeski
