= Kelda Roys =

American politician (born 1979)

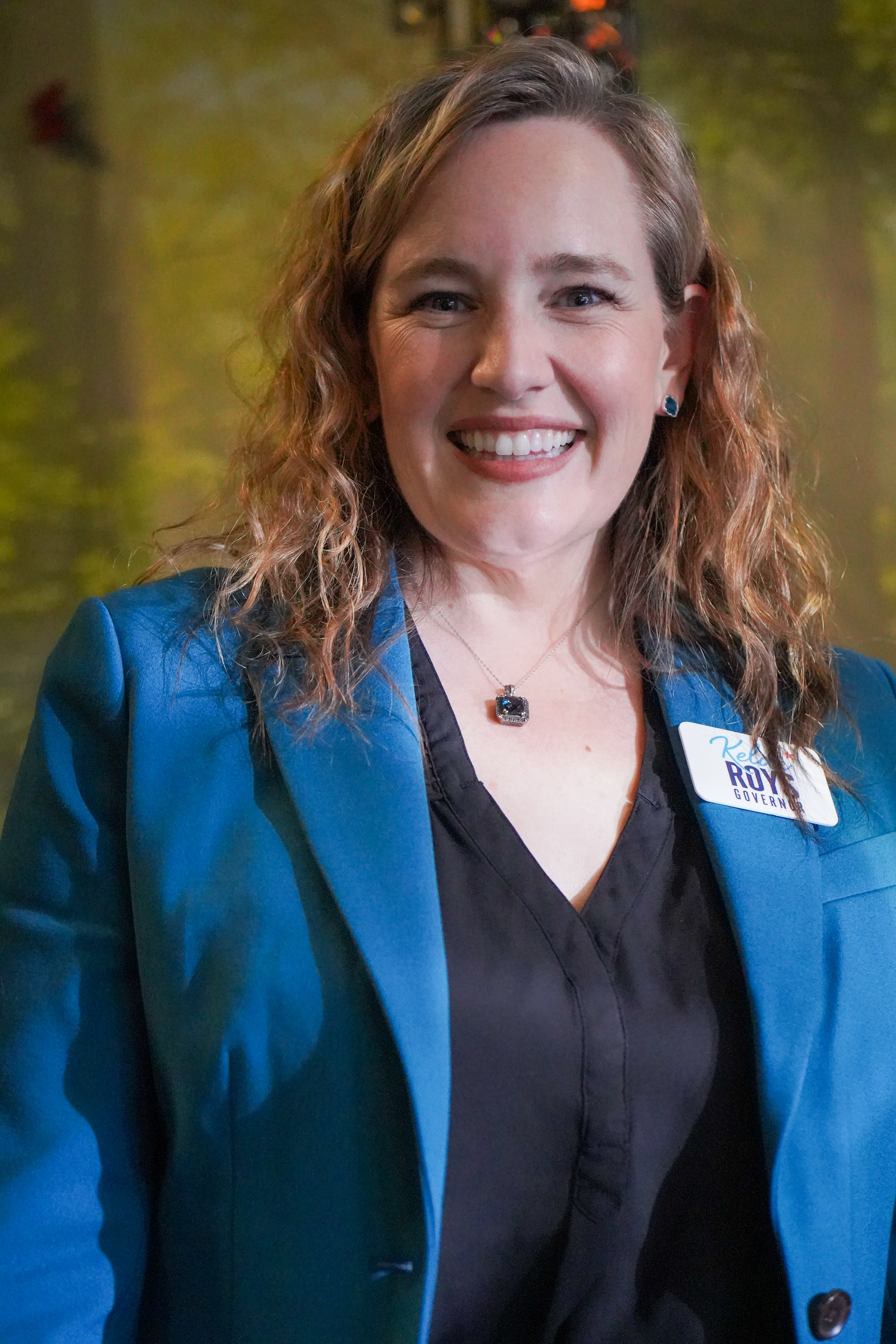
- Roys in 2026

Member of the Wisconsin Senate from the 26th district
- Incumbent
- Assumed office January 4, 2021
- Preceded by: Fred Risser

Member of the Wisconsin State Assembly from the 81st district
- In office January 5, 2009 – January 7, 2013
- Preceded by: David Travis
- Succeeded by: Fred Clark

Personal details
- Born: Kelda Helen Roys; June 24, 1979 (age 47) Marshfield, Wisconsin, U.S.
- Party: Democratic
- Spouse: Dan Reed
- Children: 3; 2 stepchildren
- Education: New York University (BA); University of Wisconsin, Madison (JD)
- Website: State Senate website Campaign website

Kelda Helen Roys (born June 24, 1979) is an American attorney, businesswoman, and politician who has represented Wisconsin's 26th Senate district in the Wisconsin Senate since 2021. A member of the Democratic Party, she previously served two terms in the Wisconsin State Assembly from 2009 to 2013. Roys was an unsuccessful candidate in the Democratic primary for governor of Wisconsin in the 2018 and 2026 elections, as well as in the 2012 congressional primary for Wisconsin's 2nd congressional district.

== Early life and education ==
Kelda Roys was born on June 24, 1979, in Marshfield, Wisconsin. During her early childhood she was raised in neighboring Medford and then Madison, Wisconsin, starting in first grade. Roys graduated from Madison East High School in 1997.

Roys attended New York University beginning in 1997. She initially majored in theater but transferred to the Gallatin School of Individualized Study at NYU halfway through her second year, where she majored in politics, drama, and cultural studies. Roys earned a Bachelor of Arts degree from the university in 2000. She graduated after three years, working a full time job in her senior year as a real-estate agent at The Marketing Directors, Inc. to help pay for college.

Roys returned to Madison to attend the University of Wisconsin Law School. She graduated with a Juris Doctor in 2004, with a focus on civil rights and international law. During her time in law school, she worked with the Wisconsin Innocence Project and worked for several international law firms in Turkey and the Netherlands.

== Legal and business career ==
After graduating from law school, Roys worked for four years as the executive director of NARAL Pro-Choice Wisconsin, where she successfully advocated for passage of the Compassionate Care for Rape Victims Act. In 2010, Roys, by then a member of the state assembly, joined the Madison-based law firm Wheeler, Van Sickle, & Anderson, S.C. as an attorney. In 2013, Roys founded a venture-backed real estate tech company, OpenHomes, a virtual real estate agency.

== Political career ==
=== Wisconsin State Assembly (2009–2013) ===
In May 2007, fifteen-term Democratic state legislator David Travis announced he would not seek re-election, causing the seat to become open. Roys began her campaign on the advice of then-Dane County executive Kathleen Falk. During the primary campaign, with all major candidates sharing a liberal platform, Roys emphasized her experience at NARAL-Pro Choice Wisconsin, as well as supporting policies meant to ensure the state obtain 100% of its power from renewable energy by 2020.

She narrowly defeated Justin Sargent, then a legislative aide to Democratic state senator Judy Robson, and also defeated lobbyist Eric Englund, Dane County assistant district attorney Tim Kiefer, Waunakee village president John Laubmeier, and business owner Peng Her. Roys went on to be elected unopposed in the general election.

In November 2009, Roys authored the "BPA Free Kids Act" which would prohibit the manufacturing and sale of baby bottles and sippy cups that contained Bisphenol A. The bill was passed by the state legislature on February 16, 2010, with the bill being signed into law by then-governor Jim Doyle on March 3, 2010.

Roys was re-elected in 2010 unopposed. After her re-election, Roys was selected by the caucus to be the Assembly Democratic caucus chair for the 100th Wisconsin Legislature. Roys supported legislation including public breastfeeding protections and a successful statewide ban of Bisphenol A, or "BPA." Roys also publicly fought against 2011 Wisconsin Act 10, and during her 2018 gubernatorial campaign had pledged to repeal the law if elected.

In 2011, shortly before announcing her candidacy for the U.S. House of Representatives, Roys attended and spoke at a pride rally, where she described going to Iowa to marry her partner. At the time, Iowa recognized same-sex marriage unlike in Wisconsin, although Roys' partner was a man, Dan Reed, and the two could have legally been married in Wisconsin. The Wisconsin Republican Party portrayed the context and ambiguous phrasing Roys used as Roys "pretending to be gay" while the executive director of LGBTQ+ advocacy group Fair Wisconsin said "She was clearly trying to represent herself as a member of the LGBT community". Roy's opponent in the 2012 primary, Mark Pocan, is gay, and reflected on the comments during Roys' 2018 run for governor, saying that Roys had made "a bad political calculation...I'm sure she's had six years to think about those things and probably regrets having done that." In 2018, Roys told PolitiFact that she had not intended to mislead people, but understood how some may have been confused. She also recalled that her husband attended the parade with her and she remembers giving him an embrace as soon as she finished her remarks. Roys said that if she had been pretending to be gay, she would not have gone to the event with her husband.

=== 2012 congressional campaign ===
In 2012, incumbent U.S. Representative Tammy Baldwin ran for the U.S. Senate seat being vacated by Herb Kohl. Roys announced she would not seek re-election to the state assembly and instead would campaign to succeed Baldwin. She faced fellow state legislator Mark Pocan, and candidates Matt Silverman and Dennis Hall, in a race where the two major candidates, Pocan and Roys, both touted their progressive credentials, with Roys attempting to portray Pocan as more moderate than herself.

During the campaign, Roys touted her endorsements, including from EMILY's List, and accused Pocan of making backroom political deals and accepting corporate donations. Roys' attacks against Pocan, though, drew criticism from other Democrats, including state legislator Fred Clark, who rescinded his endorsement of Roys, and state legislator Janis Ringhand, who decided to endorse Pocan over the attacks. On election day, Roys was defeated in the primary by a larger-than-expected 51 point margin.

=== 2018 gubernatorial campaign ===
On December 11, 2017, Roys formed an exploratory committee to run for governor of Wisconsin. During the campaign, Roys again ran as a progressive, focusing on issues such as a $15 minimum wage, student loan debt forgiveness and engaging with progressive voters. She gained national attention when a campaign ad in which she breastfeeds her infant daughter went viral. The ad drew attention to legislation Roys had supported during her time in the state assembly to ban the use of Bisphenol A in baby bottles, which is used in various plastic products and can linings.

Roys won first place by 12 points in the Democratic Party of Wisconsin State Convention straw poll. In July 2018, the Roys campaign announced that she had raised over $800,000. In the primary election, Roys came in third out of the eight candidates, with Tony Evers winning the nomination and going on to defeat Scott Walker.

=== Wisconsin Senate (2021–present) ===
In March 2020, Fred Risser, the longest-serving legislator in American history, announced he would retire from his seat in the Wisconsin State Senate at the end of the 2019–2020 term. Roys announced her candidacy to run for the open seat on March 27. The race, in the heavily Democratic region of Dane County, Wisconsin, attracted six other candidates in a crowded Democratic primary, which was also defined by the COVID-19 pandemic in Wisconsin and the protests against institutional racism prompted by the murder of George Floyd. In the August primary, Roys prevailed over her six competitors, winning 40% of the vote. She was unopposed in the November general election and assumed office in January 2021.

In 2023, after Melissa Agard stepped down as Senate Democratic Caucus leader, Roys announced a bid to succeed her, but was defeated by Dianne Hesselbein. In 2024, Roys was re-elected unopposed.

In February 2025, Roys, alongside state representative Brienne Brown, proposed legislation to prevent landlords from engaging in price collusion. In April 2025, Roys, alongside state representative Lisa Subeck, proposed the "Abortion Rights Restoration Act," which would establish a right to abortion in Wisconsin Law.

Roys is a member of the Joint Committee on Finance, which is in charge of the state budget. She co-leads the legislature's Reproductive Freedom Workgroup and is a member of the LGBTQ+ caucus.

=== 2026 gubernatorial campaign ===
Throughout 2024 and into 2025, pundits in Wisconsin began speculating about whether governor Tony Evers—who would be 79 at the end of a potential third term—would run again. Evers formally announced on July 24, 2025, that he would not run for re-election in 2026; Roys expressed interest in running a month later. Roys' decision to enter the race was delayed due to fear of violence and personal attacks against herself and her family; Roys' name had been on the list of potential targets of Minnesota political assassin Vance Luther Boelter, found at the time of his arrest in June 2025.

On September 15, 2025, Roys began her campaign for governor of Wisconsin, claiming that "extremists" like president Donald Trump and Elon Musk were a threat to democracy, and calling to fund public education, make health care more affordable, and create new jobs in the state. Following the deaths of Renée Good and Alex Pretti, Roys called for ICE to be abolished, and for their agents to face prosecution. At an April Democratic primary forum, Roys called for the establishment of a statewide public option in Wisconsin, with health care coverage comparable to that of state employees and legislators. She called for giving local municipalities more control over the siting of AI data centers in their communities. She also rejected an outright moratorium on the construction of AI data centers.

Roys ultimately placed third in the primary, behind David Crowley and Francesca Hong.

== Personal life ==
Roys has a husband, three children, and two stepdaughters. Her mother was a social worker, her stepfather was an environmental lawyer, and her father was a prosecutor and law enforcement officer. She is a secular humanist and a Unitarian Universalist.

== Electoral history ==
=== Wisconsin Assembly (2008, 2010) ===
Year	Election	Date	Elected				Defeated				Total	Plurality
2008	Primary	Sep. 9	Kelda Helen Roys	Democratic	1,960	31.10%	Justin Sargent	Dem.	1,683	26.71%	6,302	277
2008	Primary	Sep. 9	Kelda Helen Roys	Democratic	1,960	31.10%	John W. Laubmeier	Dem.	1,001	15.88%	6,302	277
2008	Primary	Sep. 9	Kelda Helen Roys	Democratic	1,960	31.10%	Eric Englund	Dem.	904	14.34%	6,302	277
2008	Primary	Sep. 9	Kelda Helen Roys	Democratic	1,960	31.10%	Tim Kiefer	Dem.	410	6.51%	6,302	277
2008	Primary	Sep. 9	Kelda Helen Roys	Democratic	1,960	31.10%	Peng Her	Dem.	337	5.35%	6,302	277
2008	General	Nov. 4	Kelda Helen Roys	Democratic	23,984	98.89%	--Unopposed--				24,253	23,715
2010	General	Nov. 2	Kelda Helen Roys (inc)	Democratic	18,698	98.90%	--Unopposed--				18,906	18,490

=== U.S. House (2012) ===
Year	Election	Date	Elected				Defeated				Total	Plurality
2012	Primary	Aug. 14	Mark Pocan	Democratic	43,171	72.16%	Kelda Helen Roys	Dem.	13,081	21.87%	59,826	30,090
2012	Primary	Aug. 14	Mark Pocan	Democratic	43,171	72.16%	Matt Silverman	Dem.	2,365	3.95%	59,826	30,090
2012	Primary	Aug. 14	Mark Pocan	Democratic	43,171	72.16%	Dennis Hall	Dem.	1,163	1.94%	59,826	30,090

=== Wisconsin Governor (2018) ===
Year	Election	Date	Elected				Defeated				Total	Plurality
2018	Primary	Aug. 14	Tony Evers	Democratic	225,082	41.77%	Mahlon Mitchell	Dem.	87,926	16.32%	538,857	137,156
2018	Primary	Aug. 14	Tony Evers	Democratic	225,082	41.77%	Kelda Helen Roys	Dem.	69,086	12.82%	538,857	137,156
2018	Primary	Aug. 14	Tony Evers	Democratic	225,082	41.77%	Kathleen Vinehout	Dem.	44,168	8.20%	538,857	137,156
2018	Primary	Aug. 14	Tony Evers	Democratic	225,082	41.77%	Mike McCabe	Dem.	39,885	7.40%	538,857	137,156
2018	Primary	Aug. 14	Tony Evers	Democratic	225,082	41.77%	Matt Flynn	Dem.	31,580	5.86%	538,857	137,156
2018	Primary	Aug. 14	Tony Evers	Democratic	225,082	41.77%	Paul Soglin	Dem.	28,158	5.23%	538,857	137,156
2018	Primary	Aug. 14	Tony Evers	Democratic	225,082	41.77%	Andy Gronik (withdrawn)	Dem.	6,627	1.23%	538,857	137,156
2018	Primary	Aug. 14	Tony Evers	Democratic	225,082	41.77%	Dana Wachs (withdrawn)	Dem.	4,216	0.78%	538,857	137,156
2018	Primary	Aug. 14	Tony Evers	Democratic	225,082	41.77%	Josh Pade	Dem.	1,908	0.35%	538,857	137,156
2018	Primary	Aug. 14	Tony Evers	Democratic	225,082	41.77%	Paul Boucher (write-in)	Dem.	10	0.00%	538,857	137,156

=== Wisconsin Senate (2020–present) ===
Year	Election	Date	Elected				Defeated				Total	Plurality
2020	Primary	Aug. 11	Kelda Helen Roys	Democratic	19,801	40.21%	Nada Elmikashfi	Dem.	13,220	26.84%	49,248	6,581
2020	Primary	Aug. 11	Kelda Helen Roys	Democratic	19,801	40.21%	Brian Benford	Dem.	4,699	9.54%	49,248	6,581
2020	Primary	Aug. 11	Kelda Helen Roys	Democratic	19,801	40.21%	Amani Latimer Burris	Dem.	4,370	8.87%	49,248	6,581
2020	Primary	Aug. 11	Kelda Helen Roys	Democratic	19,801	40.21%	Aisha Moe	Dem.	3,632	7.37%	49,248	6,581
2020	Primary	Aug. 11	Kelda Helen Roys	Democratic	19,801	40.21%	John Imes	Dem.	3,074	6.24%	49,248	6,581
2020	Primary	Aug. 11	Kelda Helen Roys	Democratic	19,801	40.21%	William Henry Davis III	Dem.	408	0.83%	49,248	6,581
2020	General	Nov. 3	Kelda Helen Roys	Democratic	102,569	98.16%	--Unopposed--				104,488	100,650
2024	General	Nov. 5	Kelda Helen Roys (inc)	Democratic	94,495	98.41%	--Unopposed--				96,021	92,969

=== Wisconsin governor (2026) ===
Year	Election	Date	Elected				Defeated				Total	Plurality
2026	Primary	Aug. 11	David Crowley	Democratic	315,413	39.81%	Francesca Hong	Dem.	311,740	39.35%	792,290	3,673
2026	Primary	Aug. 11	David Crowley	Democratic	315,413	39.81%	Kelda Roys	Dem.	59,394	7.50%	792,290	3,673
2026	Primary	Aug. 11	David Crowley	Democratic	315,413	39.81%	Joel Brennan	Dem.	37,084	4.68%	792,290	3,673
2026	Primary	Aug. 11	David Crowley	Democratic	315,413	39.81%	Sara Rodriguez (withdrawn)	Dem.	32,674	4.12%	792,290	3,673
2026	Primary	Aug. 11	David Crowley	Democratic	315,413	39.81%	Mandela Barnes (withdrawn)	Dem.	32,435	4.09%	792,290	3,673
2026	Primary	Aug. 11	David Crowley	Democratic	315,413	39.81%	Missy Hughes (withdrawn)	Dem.	3,230	0.41%	792,290	3,673
2026	Primary	Aug. 11	David Crowley	Democratic	315,413	39.81%	Brett Hulsey (write-in; withdrawn)	Dem.	13	0.00%	792,290	3,673
2026	Primary	Aug. 11	David Crowley	Democratic	315,413	39.81%	Tim Reppen (write-in)	Dem.	10	0.00%	792,290	3,673
