= Tony Kurtz =

American politician (born 1966)

Member of the Wisconsin State Assembly
- Incumbent
- Assumed office January 6, 2025
- Preceded by: Alex Dallman
- Constituency: 41st district
- In office January 7, 2019 – January 6, 2025
- Preceded by: Edward Brooks
- Succeeded by: Jenna Jacobson
- Constituency: 50th district

Personal details
- Born: December 23, 1966 (age 59) Columbus, Ohio, U.S.
- Party: Republican
- Spouse: Kim
- Children: 2
- Education: Embry-Riddle Aeronautical University (BS); Troy University (MS)
- Website: Assembly website; Member page

Military service
- Allegiance: United States
- Branch/service: United States Army
- Years of service: 1985–2005
- Rank: Chief Warrant Officer Four
- Battles/wars: Gulf War; Iraq War

Tony Kurtz (born December 23, 1966) is an American businessman and Republican politician from Juneau County, Wisconsin. He is a member of the Wisconsin State Assembly, representing Wisconsin's 41st Assembly district since 2025; he previously represented the 50th Assembly district from 2019 to 2025.

== Biography ==
He is the CEO of Kaynick Solutions. Kurtz served in the Wisconsin State Assembly since January 2019 and is a Republican. He ran for Wisconsin's 3rd congressional district in 2014 and lost to Democratic incumbent Ron Kind.

Kurtz lives on a farm with his wife and family in Wonewoc, Wisconsin. He went to Troy State University and Embry–Riddle Aeronautical University. Kurtz served in the United States Army.

In the 2020 election, Kurtz voted for Donald Trump.

In 2021, Kurtz supported a Republican proposal to reduce taxes in Wisconsin by $2.8 billion;

Wisconsin State Assembly
Preceded by Edward Brooks	Member of the Wisconsin State Assembly from the 50th district January 7, 2019 – January 6, 2025	Succeeded by Jenna Jacobson
Preceded by Alex Dallman	Member of the Wisconsin State Assembly from the 41st district January 6, 2025 – present	Incumbent
