= Wisconsin's 41st Assembly district =

American legislative district in west-central Wisconsin

Wisconsin's 41st State Assembly district
- 2024 map defined in 2023 Wisc. Act 94; 2022 map defined in Johnson v. Wisconsin Elections Commission; 2011 map was defined in 2011 Wisc. Act 43
Assemblymember
Tony Kurtz; R–Wonewoc
since January 6, 2025 (1 years)
- Demographics: 90.64% White; 1.14% Black; 4.39% Hispanic; 0.74% Asian; 2.36% Native American; 0.1% Hawaiian/Pacific Islander
- Population (2020) • Voting age: 59,672; 46,466
- Website: Official website
- Notes: West-central Wisconsin

The 41st Assembly district of Wisconsin is one of 99 districts in the Wisconsin State Assembly. Located in west-central Wisconsin, the district comprises all of Richland County, much of the north half of Sauk County, and parts of southern Juneau County, southern Adams County, and northwest Columbia County. It includes the cities of Reedsburg, Richland Center, and Wisconsin Dells, and the villages of Boaz, Cazenovia, Ironton, La Valle, Lake Delton, Lime Ridge, Loganville, Lone Rock, Lyndon Station, North Freedom, Rock Springs, Union Center, Viola, Wonewoc, and Yuba. The district also contains the Dells of the Wisconsin River State Natural Area, Mirror Lake State Park, Dell Creek State Wildlife Area, the Mt. Olympus Water & Theme Park, and the Noah's Ark Water Park. The seat is represented by Republican Tony Kurtz since January 2025; Kurtz previously represented the 50th district from 2019 to 2025.

The 41st Assembly district is located within Wisconsin's 14th Senate district, along with the 40th and 42nd Assembly districts.

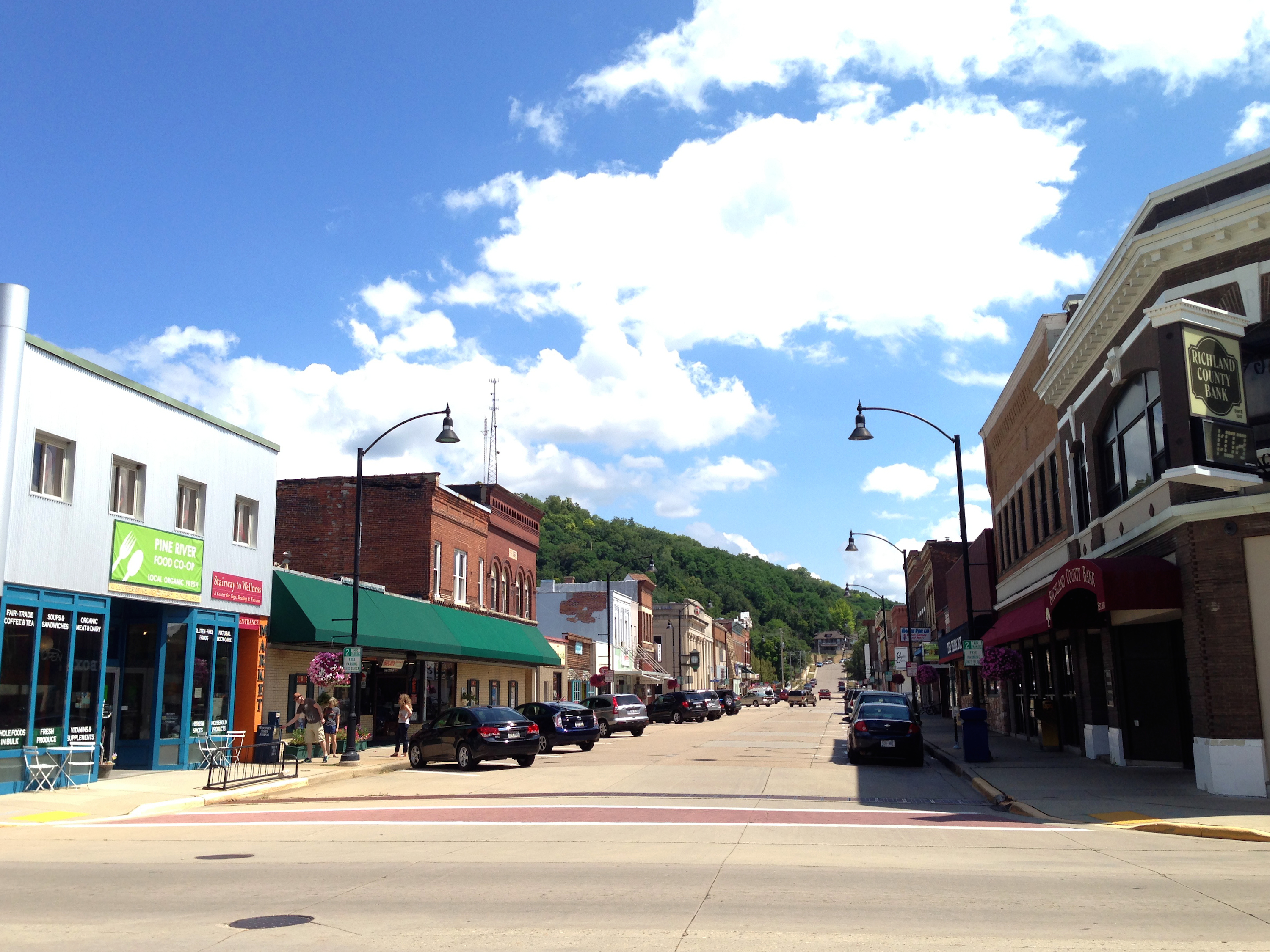
Downtown Richland Center

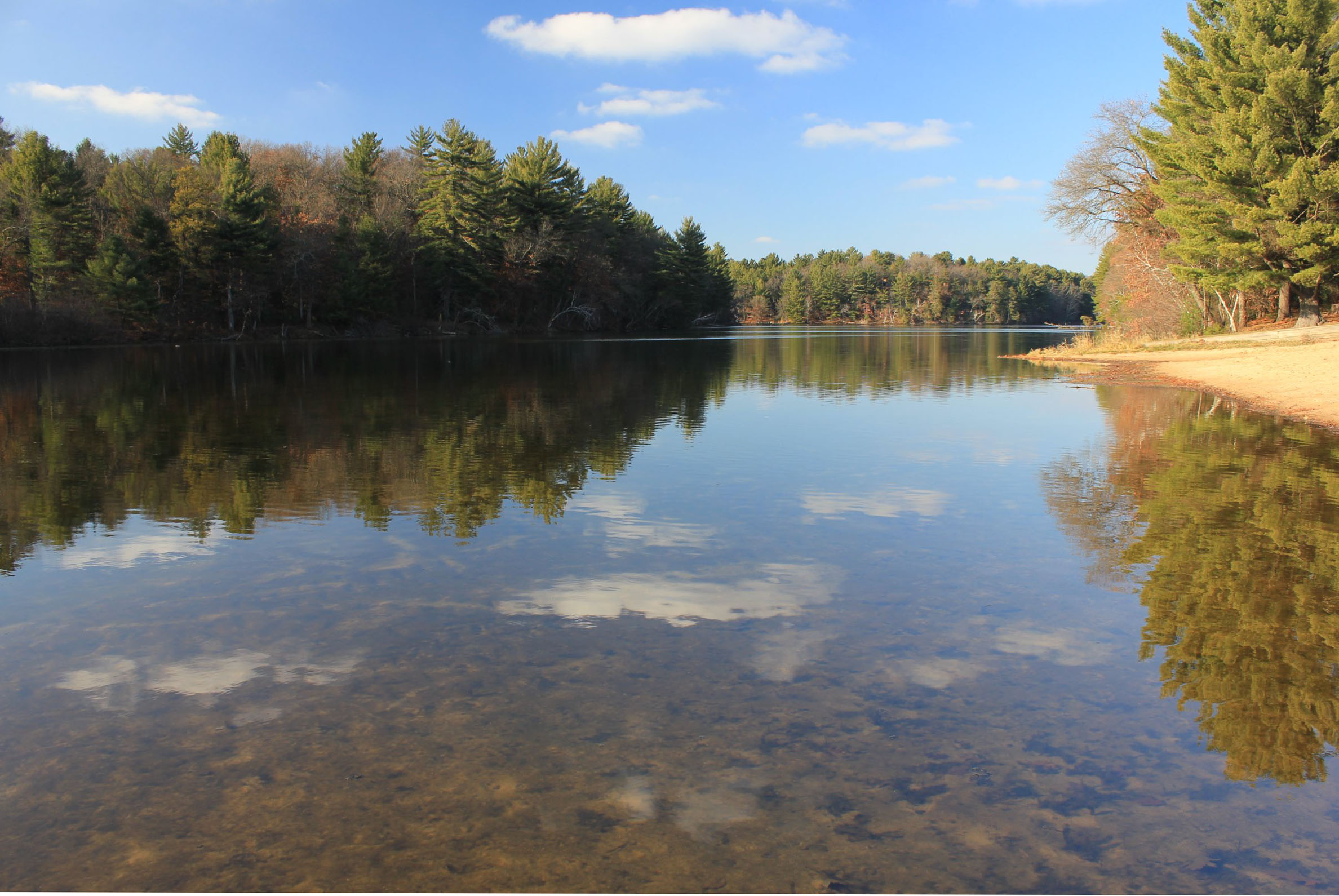
Mirror Lake State Park

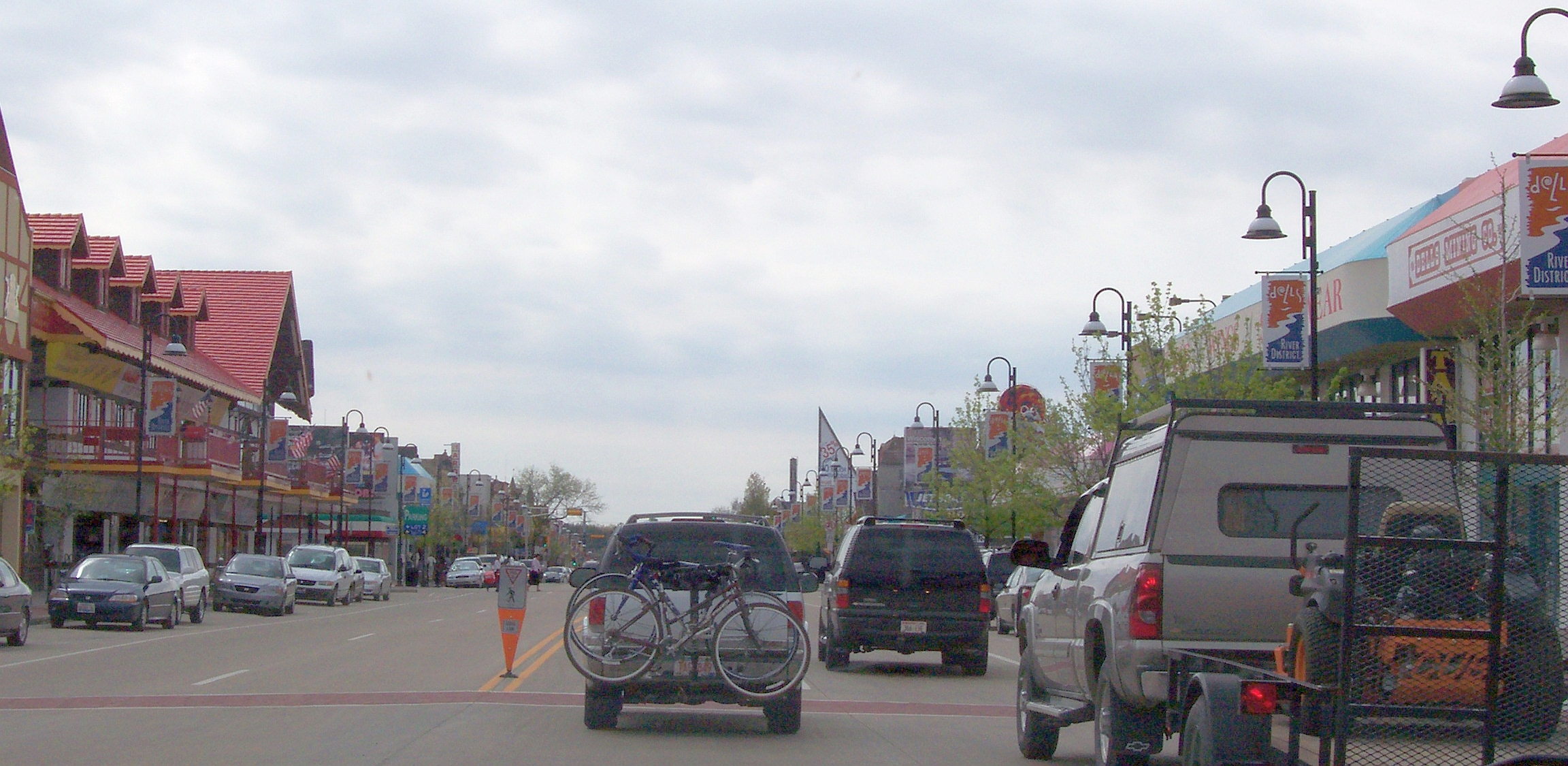
Downtown Wisconsin Dells

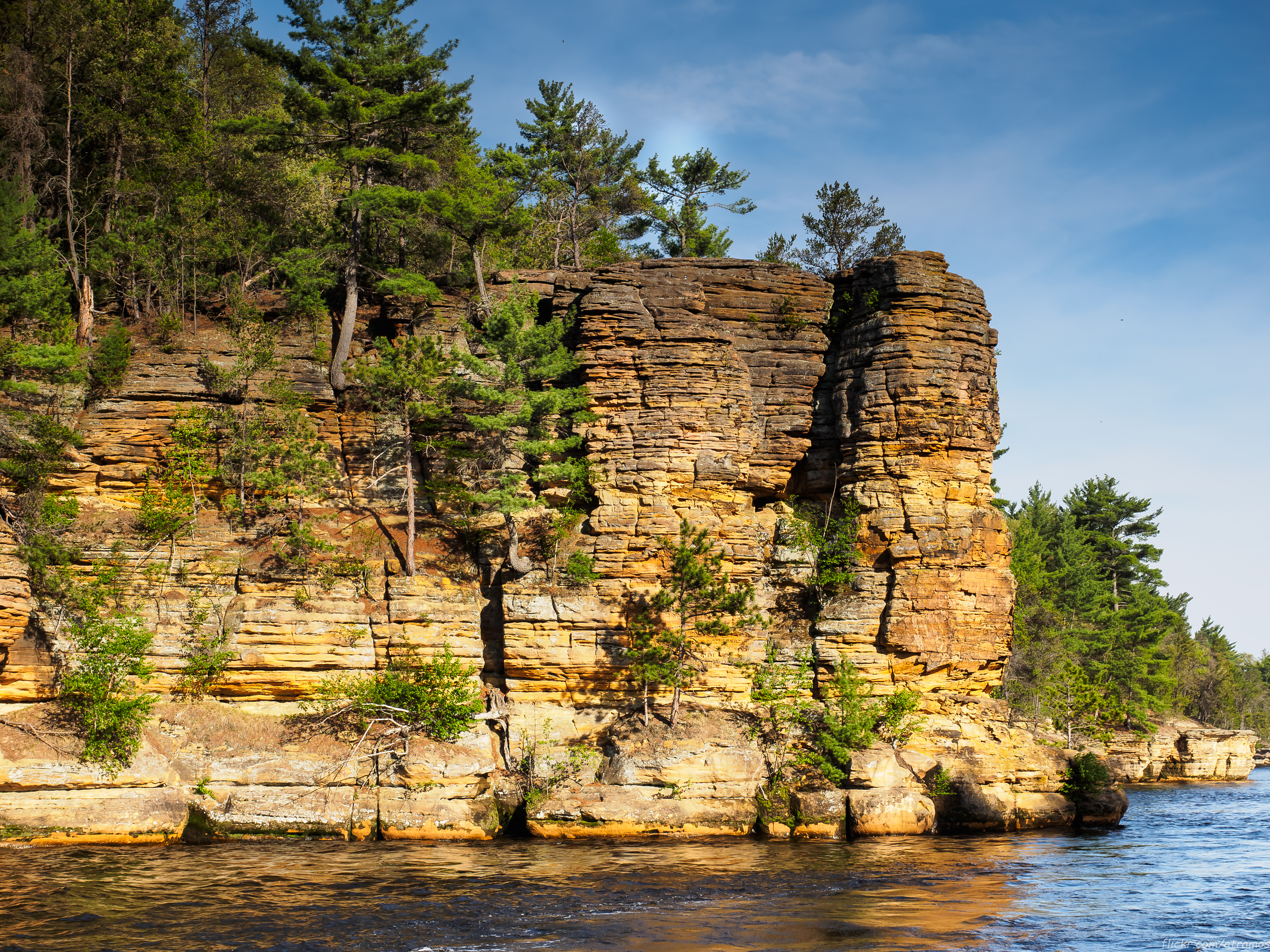
Dells of the Wisconsin River

== List of past representatives ==
List of representatives to the Wisconsin State Assembly from the 41st district
Member	Party	Residence	Counties represented	Term start	Term end	Ref.
District created
Ervin Conradt	Rep.	Shiocton	Outagamie, Shawano	January 1, 1973	January 3, 1983	
Richard Shoemaker	Dem.	Menomonie	Dunn, St. Croix	January 3, 1983	January 7, 1985	
Robert T. Welch	Rep.	Redgranite	Fond du Lac, Green Lake, Waushara, Winnebago	January 7, 1985	January 2, 1995	
Luther Olsen	Rep.	Berlin	Fond du Lac, Green Lake, Marquette, Waupaca, Waushara	January 2, 1995	January 3, 2005	
Joan Ballweg	Rep.	Markesan	Fond du Lac, Green Lake, Marquette, Waupaca, Waushara	January 3, 2005	January 4, 2021	
Joan Ballweg	Rep.	Markesan	Adams, Fond du Lac, Green Lake, Marquette	January 3, 2005	January 4, 2021	
Alex Dallman	Rep.	Green Lake	Adams, Fond du Lac, Green Lake, Marquette	January 4, 2021	January 6, 2025	
Alex Dallman	Rep.	Green Lake	Adams, Columbia, Green Lake, Marquette, Sauk, Waushara	January 4, 2021	January 6, 2025	
Tony Kurtz	Rep.	Wonewoc	Adams, Juneau, Richland, Sauk	January 6, 2025	Current	
