= 105th Wisconsin Legislature =

Wisconsin legislative term for 2021–2022

←	104th	106th	→
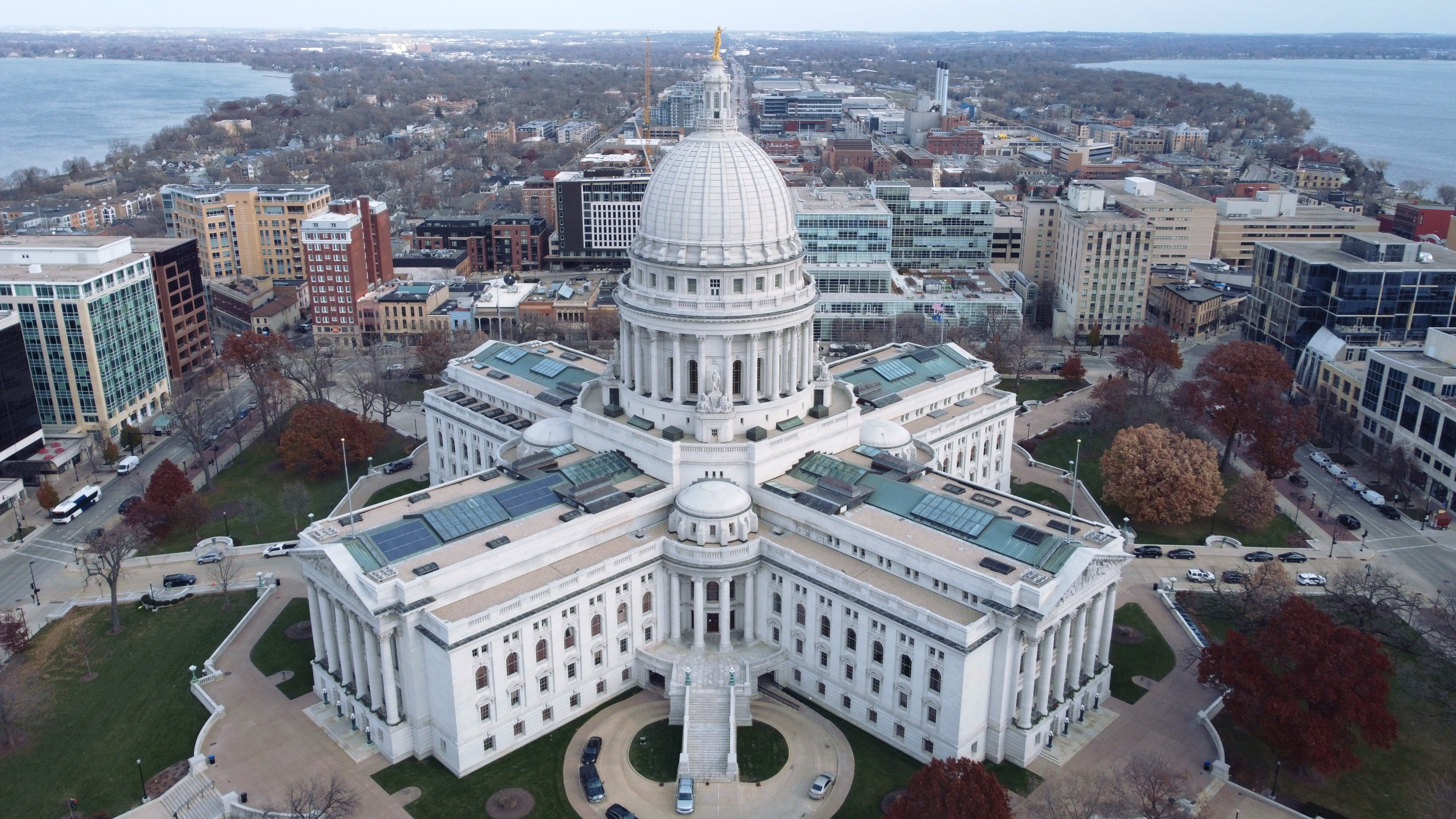
- Wisconsin State Capitol

Overview
- Legislative body: Wisconsin Legislature
- Meeting place: Wisconsin State Capitol
- Term: January 4, 2021 – January 2, 2023
- Election: November 3, 2020

Senate
- Members: 33
- Senate President: Chris Kapenga (R)
- President pro tempore: Patrick Testin (R)
- Party control: Republican

Assembly
- Members: 99
- Assembly Speaker: Robin Vos (R)
- Speaker pro tempore: Tyler August (R)
- Party control: Republican

Sessions
- Regular: January 4, 2021 – January 3, 2023

Special sessions
- Jan. 2021 Spec.: January 19, 2021 – February 23, 2021
- Feb. 2021 Extra.: February 5, 2021 – April 1, 2021
- May 2021 Spec.: May 24, 2021 – May 25, 2021
- June 2021 Extra.: June 29, 2021 – July 27, 2021
- July 2021 Spec.: July 27, 2021 – July 27, 2021
- March 2022 Spec.: March 8, 2022 – March 8, 2022
- June 2022 Spec.: June 22, 2022 – June 22, 2022
- Oct. 2022 Spec.: October 4, 2022 – October 4, 2022

The One Hundred Fifth Wisconsin Legislature convened from January 4, 2021, to January 3, 2023, in regular session. The Legislature also held two extraordinary sessions and six special sessions during the term.

Senators representing even-numbered districts were newly elected for this session and were serving the first two years of a four-year term. Assembly members were elected to a two-year term. Assembly members and even-numbered senators were elected in the general election of November 3, 2020. Senators representing odd-numbered districts were serving the third and fourth year of their four-year term, having been elected in the general election held on November 6, 2018.

The governor of Wisconsin during this entire term was Democrat Tony Evers, of Dane County, serving the second two years of a four-year term, having won election in the 2018 Wisconsin gubernatorial election.

== Major events ==
- May 1, 2021: Annette Ziegler became the 27th chief justice of the Wisconsin Supreme Court by a majority vote of the court's members.
- May 19, 2021: Governor Tony Evers called a special session of the Legislature to consider a bill to adopt Medicaid expansion.
- June 29, 2021: Governor Tony Evers vetoed an act of the Legislature which would have ended federal supplemental unemployment benefits funded under the American Rescue Plan Act of 2021.
- July 27, 2021: The Wisconsin Legislature met in extraordinary session and failed to override the veto of an act which would have ended federal supplemental unemployment benefits.
- November 21, 2021: The Waukesha Christmas parade attack in Waukesha, Wisconsin, resulted in six deaths and 62 injuries.
- March 3, 2022: The Wisconsin Supreme Court selected new district maps for Wisconsin's legislative and congressional districts.
- March 23, 2022: The United States Supreme Court struck down the legislative map chosen by the Wisconsin Supreme Court.
- April 15, 2022: After the U.S. Supreme Court decision, the Wisconsin Supreme Court selected the Republican redistricting plan.
- June 8, 2022: Wisconsin Governor Tony Evers called a special session of the Legislature to repeal Wisconsin's abortion ban.
- September 21, 2022: Wisconsin Governor Tony Evers called a special session of the Legislature to propose an amendment to the Wisconsin Constitution to allow citizen petition-initiated amendments to the state Constitution.
- November 8, 2022: 2022 United States general election:
  - Tony Evers (D) re-elected as Governor of Wisconsin.
  - Ron Johnson (R) re-elected as United States senator from Wisconsin.

== Major legislation ==
- July 8, 2021: An Act relating to: state finances and appropriations, constituting the executive budget act of the 2021 legislature, 2021 Act 58.

== Party summary ==
=== Senate summary ===
Senate Partisan composition Democratic: 12 seats Republican: 21 seats

	Party (Shading indicates majority caucus)		Total	
	Democratic	Republican	Total	Vacant
End of previous Legislature	13	18	31	2
Start of Reg. Session (Note: Republican Scott L. Fitzgerald (13th district) resigned before the start of the session, due to his election to the United States House of Representatives.)	12	20	32	1
From Apr. 23, 2021 (Note: Republican John Jagler (13th district) was sworn in to succeed Scott Fitzgerald.)	12	21	33	0
Final voting share	36.36%	63.64%		
Beginning of the next Legislature	11	21	32	1

=== Assembly summary ===
Assembly Partisan composition Democratic: 38 seats Republican: 61 seats

	Party (Shading indicates majority caucus)		Total	
	Democratic	Republican	Total	Vacant
End of previous Legislature	34	62	96	3
Start of Reg. Session (Note: Republican John Nygren (89th district) resigned before the start of the session.)	38	60	98	1
From Apr. 23, 2021 (Note: Republican John Jagler (37th district) resigned due to his election to the state senate.)	38	59	97	2
From May 11, 2021 (Note: Republican Elijah Behnke (89th district) was sworn in to succeed John Nygren.)	38	60	98	1
From Jul. 26, 2021 (Note: Republican William Penterman (37th district) was sworn in to replace John Jagler.)	38	61	99	0
From May 19, 2022 (Note: Republican Mike Kuglitsch (84th district) resigned.)	38	60	98	1
From Jun 1, 2022 (Note: Republican Tyler Vorpagel (27th district) resigned.)	38	59	97	2
From Jun. 7, 2022 (Note: Republican Samantha Kerkman (61st district) resigned due to her election as county executive.)	38	58	96	3
From Jul. 27, 2022 (Note: Republican Jim Steineke (5th district) resigned.)	38	57	95	4
Final voting share	40%	60%		
Beginning of the next Legislature	35	64	99	0

== Sessions ==
- Regular session: January 4, 2021 – January 3, 2023
- January 2021 special session: January 19, 2021 – February 23, 2021
- February 2021 extraordinary session: February 5, 2021 – April 1, 2021
- May 2021 special session: May 24, 2021 – May 25, 2021
- June 2021 extraordinary session: June 29, 2021 – July 27, 2021
- July 2021 special session: July 27, 2021
- March 2022 special session: March 8, 2022
- June 2022 special session: June 22, 2022
- October 2022 special session: October 4, 2022

== Leadership ==
=== Senate leadership ===
- President of the Senate: Chris Kapenga (R–Delafield)
- President pro tempore: Patrick Testin (R–Stevens Point)

Senate majority leadership (Republican)

- Senate Majority Leader: Devin LeMahieu (R–Sheboygan)
- Assistant Majority Leader: Dan Feyen (R–Fond du Lac)
- Senate Majority Caucus Chair: Van H. Wanggaard (R–Racine)
- Senate Majority Caucus Vice Chair: Kathy Bernier (R–Chippewa Falls)

Senate minority leadership (Democratic)

- Senate Minority Leader: Janet Bewley (D–Mason)
- Assistant Minority Leader: Janis Ringhand (D–Evansville)
- Senate Minority Caucus Chair: Jeff Smith (D–Eau Claire)
- Senate Minority Caucus Vice Chair: Melissa Agard (D–Madison)

=== Assembly leadership ===
- Speaker of the Assembly: Robin Vos (R–Burlington)
- Speaker pro tempore: Tyler August (R–Lake Geneva)

Assembly majority leadership (Republican)

- Assembly Majority Leader: Jim Steineke (R–Kaukauna) (until Jul. 27, 2022)
  - --Vacant after July 27, 2022--
- Assistant Majority Leader: Kevin David Petersen (R–Waupaca)
- Assembly Majority Caucus Chair: Tyler Vorpagel (R–Plymouth) (until Jun. 1, 2022)
  - --Vacant after Jun. 1, 2022--
- Assembly Majority Caucus Vice Chair: Cindi Duchow (R–Delafield)
- Assembly Majority Caucus Secretary: Jesse James (R–Altoona)
- Assembly Majority Caucus Sergeant-at-Arms: Samantha Kerkman (R–Salem) (until Jun. 7, 2022)
  - --Vacant after Jun. 7, 2022--

Assembly minority leadership (Democratic)

- Assembly Minority Leader: Gordon Hintz (D–Oshkosh) (until Jan. 10, 2022)
  - Greta Neubauer (D–Racine) (after Jan. 10, 2022)
- Assistant Minority Leader: Dianne Hesselbein (D–Middleton) (until Jan. 10, 2022)
  - Kalan Haywood (D–Milwaukee) (after Jan. 10, 2022)
- Assembly Minority Caucus Chair: Mark Spreitzer (D–Beloit) (until Apr. 2022)
  - Lisa Subeck (D–Madison) (after Apr. 2022)
- Assembly Minority Caucus Vice Chair: Lisa Subeck (D–Madison) (until Apr. 2022)
  - Jill Billings (D–La Crosse) (after Apr. 2022)
- Assembly Minority Caucus Secretary: Beth Meyers (D–Bayfield) (until Jan. 10, 2022)
  - Kristina Shelton (D–Green Bay) (after Jan. 10, 2022)
- Assembly Minority Caucus Sergeant-at-Arms: Kalan Haywood (D–Milwaukee) (until Jan. 10, 2022)
  - Lee Snodgrass (D–Appleton) (after Jan. 10, 2022)

== Members ==
=== Members of the Senate ===
Members of the Wisconsin Senate for the One Hundred Fifth Wisconsin Legislature:

Senate partisan representation Democratic: 12 seats Republican: 21 seats

Dist.	Senator	Party	Age (2021)	Home	First elected
01	André Jacque	Rep.	40	De Pere, Brown County	2018
02	Robert Cowles	Rep.	70	Green Bay, Brown County	1987
03	Tim Carpenter	Dem.	60	Milwaukee, Milwaukee County	2002
04	Lena Taylor	Dem.	54	Milwaukee, Milwaukee County	2004
05	Dale Kooyenga	Rep.	41	Brookfield, Waukesha County	2018
06	LaTonya Johnson	Dem.	48	Milwaukee, Milwaukee County	2016
07	Chris Larson	Dem.	40	Milwaukee, Milwaukee County	2010
08	Alberta Darling (res. Dec. 1, 2022)	Rep.	76	River Hills, Milwaukee County	1992
08	--Vacant from Dec. 1, 2022--				
09	Devin LeMahieu	Rep.	48	Oostburg, Sheboygan County	2014
10	Rob Stafsholt	Rep.	45	New Richmond, St. Croix County	2020
11	Stephen Nass	Rep.	68	La Grange, Walworth County	2014
12	Mary Felzkowski	Rep.	57	Birch, Lincoln County	2020
13	--Vacant until Apr. 23, 2021--				
13	John Jagler (from Apr. 23, 2021)	Rep.	51	Watertown, Jefferson County	2021
14	Joan Ballweg	Rep.	68	Markesan, Green Lake County	2020
15	Janis Ringhand	Dem.	70	Evansville, Rock County	2014
16	Melissa Agard	Dem.	51	Madison, Dane County	2020
17	Howard Marklein	Rep.	66	Spring Green, Sauk County	2014
18	Dan Feyen	Rep.	52–53	Fond du Lac, Fond du Lac County	2016
19	Roger Roth	Rep.	42	Appleton, Outagamie County	2014
20	Duey Stroebel	Rep.	61	Saukville, Ozaukee County	2015
21	Van H. Wanggaard	Rep.	68	Racine, Racine County	2010
22	Robert Wirch	Dem.	77	Somers, Kenosha County	1996
23	Kathy Bernier	Rep.	64	Chippewa Falls, Chippewa County	2018
24	Patrick Testin	Rep.	32	Stevens Point, Portage County	2016
25	Janet Bewley	Dem.	69	Mason, Bayfield County	2014
26	Kelda Roys	Dem.	41	Madison, Dane County	2020
27	Jon Erpenbach	Dem.	59	West Point, Columbia County	1998
28	Julian Bradley	Rep.	39	Franklin, Milwaukee County	2020
29	Jerry Petrowski	Rep.	70	Marathon, Marathon County	2012
30	Eric Wimberger	Rep.	41	De Pere, Brown County	2020
31	Jeff Smith	Dem.	65	Eau Claire, Eau Claire County	2018
32	Brad Pfaff	Dem.	53	Onalaska, La Crosse County	2020
33	Chris Kapenga	Rep.	48	Delafield, Waukesha County	2015

=== Members of the Assembly ===
Members of the Assembly for the One Hundred Fifth Wisconsin Legislature:

Assembly partisan representation Democratic: 38 seats Republican: 61 seats

Sen. Dist.	Dist.	Representative	Party	Age (2021)	Residence	First Elected
01	01	Joel Kitchens	Rep.	63	Sturgeon Bay	2014
01	02	Shae Sortwell	Rep.	35	Two Rivers	2018
01	03	Ron Tusler	Rep.	36	Appleton	2016
02	04	David Steffen	Rep.	48	Howard	2014
02	05	Jim Steineke (res. Jul. 27, 2022)	Rep.	50	Vandenbroek	2010
02	05	--Vacant from Jul. 27, 2022--				
02	06	Gary Tauchen	Rep.	67	Bonduel	2006
03	07	Daniel Riemer	Dem.	34	Milwaukee	2012
03	08	Sylvia Ortiz-Velez	Dem.		Milwaukee	2020
03	09	Marisabel Cabrera	Dem.	45	Milwaukee	2018
04	10	David Bowen	Dem.	33	Milwaukee	2014
04	11	Dora Drake	Dem.	27	Milwaukee	2020
04	12	LaKeshia Myers	Dem.	36	Milwaukee	2018
05	13	Sara Rodriguez	Dem.	45	Brookfield	2020
05	14	Robyn Vining	Dem.	44	Wauwatosa	2018
05	15	Joe Sanfelippo	Rep.	56	New Berlin	2012
06	16	Kalan Haywood	Dem.	21	Milwaukee	2018
06	17	Supreme Moore Omokunde	Dem.	41	Milwaukee	2020
06	18	Evan Goyke	Dem.	38	Milwaukee	2012
07	19	Jonathan Brostoff	Dem.	37	Milwaukee	2014
07	20	Christine Sinicki	Dem.	60	Bay View	1998
07	21	Jessie Rodriguez	Rep.	43	Oak Creek	2013
08	22	Janel Brandtjen	Rep.	54	Waukesha	2014
08	23	Deb Andraca	Dem.	50	Whitefish Bay	2020
08	24	Dan Knodl	Rep.	62	Germantown	2008
09	25	Paul Tittl	Rep.	59	Manitowoc	2012
09	26	Terry Katsma	Rep.	62	Oostburg	2014
09	27	Tyler Vorpagel (res. Jun. 1, 2022)	Rep.	35	Plymouth	2014
09	27	--Vacant from Jun. 1, 2022--				
10	28	Gae Magnafici	Rep.	68	Dresser	2018
10	29	Clint Moses	Rep.	44	Menomonie	2020
10	30	Shannon Zimmerman	Rep.	48	River Falls	2016
11	31	Amy Loudenbeck	Rep.	51	Clinton	2010
11	32	Tyler August	Rep.	37	Walworth	2010
11	33	Cody Horlacher	Rep.	33	Mukwonago	2014
12	34	Rob Swearingen	Rep.	57	Rhinelander	2012
12	35	Calvin Callahan	Rep.	21	Wilson	2020
12	36	Jeffrey Mursau	Rep.	66	Crivitz	2004
13	37	--Vacant until July 26, 2021--				
13	37	William Penterman (after Jul. 26, 2021)	Rep.	24	Columbus	2021
13	38	Barbara Dittrich	Rep.	56	Oconomowoc	2018
13	39	Mark Born	Rep.	44	Beaver Dam	2012
14	40	Kevin David Petersen	Rep.	56	Waupaca	2006
14	41	Alex Dallman	Rep.	28	Green Lake	2020
14	42	Jon Plumer	Rep.	65	Lodi	2018
15	43	Don Vruwink	Dem.	68	Milton	2016
15	44	Sue Conley	Dem.	60	Janesville	2020
15	45	Mark Spreitzer	Dem.	34	Beloit	2014
16	46	Gary Hebl	Dem.	69	Sun Prairie	2004
16	47	Jimmy P. Anderson	Dem.	34	Fitchburg	2016
16	48	Samba Baldeh	Dem.	50	Madison	2020
17	49	Travis Tranel	Rep.	35	Cuba City	2010
17	50	Tony Kurtz	Rep.	54	Wonewoc	2018
17	51	Todd Novak	Rep.	55	Dodgeville	2014
18	52	Jeremy Thiesfeldt	Rep.	54	Fond du Lac	2010
18	53	Michael Schraa	Rep.	59	Oshkosh	2012
18	54	Gordon Hintz	Dem.	47	Oshkosh	2006
19	55	Rachael Cabral-Guevara	Rep.	44	Fox Crossing	2020
19	56	Dave Murphy	Rep.	66	Greenville	2012
19	57	Lee Snodgrass	Dem.	51	Appleton	2020
20	58	Rick Gundrum	Rep.	55	Slinger	2018
20	59	Timothy Ramthun	Rep.	63	Campbellsport	2018
20	60	Robert Brooks	Rep.	55	Saukville	2014
21	61	Samantha Kerkman (res. Jun. 7, 2022)	Rep.	46	Burlington	2000
21	61	--Vacant from June 7, 2022--				
21	62	Robert Wittke	Rep.	63	Racine	2018
21	63	Robin Vos	Rep.	52	Rochester	2004
22	64	Tip McGuire	Dem.	33	Somers	2019
22	65	Tod Ohnstad	Dem.	68	Kenosha	2012
22	66	Greta Neubauer	Dem.	29	Racine	2018
23	67	Rob Summerfield	Rep.	40	Bloomer	2016
23	68	Jesse James	Rep.	48	Altoona	2018
23	69	Donna Rozar	Rep.	70	Marshfield	2020
24	70	Nancy VanderMeer	Rep.	62	Tomah	2014
24	71	Katrina Shankland	Dem.	33	Stevens Point	2012
24	72	Scott Krug	Rep.	45	Wisconsin Rapids	2010
25	73	Nick Milroy	Dem.	46	Superior	2008
25	74	Beth Meyers	Dem.	61	Bayfield	2014
25	75	David Armstrong	Rep.	59	Rice Lake	2020
26	76	Francesca Hong	Dem.	32	Madison	2020
26	77	Shelia Stubbs	Dem.	49	Madison	2018
26	78	Lisa Subeck	Dem.	49	Madison	2014
27	79	Dianne Hesselbein	Dem.	49	Middleton	2012
27	80	Sondy Pope-Roberts	Dem.	70	Mount Horeb	2002
27	81	Dave Considine	Dem.	68	Baraboo	2014
28	82	Ken Skowronski	Rep.	82	Franklin	2013
28	83	Chuck Wichgers	Rep.	55	Muskego	2016
28	84	Mike Kuglitsch (res. May 19, 2022)	Rep.	60	New Berlin	2010
28	84	--Vacant from May 19, 2022--				
29	85	Patrick Snyder	Rep.	64	Schofield	2016
29	86	John Spiros	Rep.	59	Marshfield	2012
29	87	James W. Edming	Rep.	75	Glen Flora	2014
30	88	John Macco	Rep.	62	De Pere	2014
30	89	Elijah Behnke	Rep.	37	Pensaukee	2021
30	90	Kristina Shelton	Dem.	40	Green Bay	2020
31	91	Jodi Emerson	Dem.	47	Eau Claire	2018
31	92	Treig Pronschinske	Rep.	53	Mondovi	2016
31	93	Warren Petryk	Rep.	65	Eleva	2010
32	94	Steve Doyle	Dem.	62	Onalaska	2011
32	95	Jill Billings	Dem.	58	La Crosse	2011
32	96	Loren Oldenburg	Rep.	55	Viroqua	2018
33	97	Scott Allen	Rep.	55	Waukesha	2014
33	98	Adam Neylon	Rep.	36	Pewaukee	2013
33	99	Cindi Duchow	Rep.	62	Delafield	2015

== Employees ==
=== Senate employees ===
- Chief Clerk: Michael Queensland
- Sergeant at Arms: Ted Blazel

=== Assembly employees ===
- Chief Clerk: Kay Inabnet
- Sergeant at Arms: Anne Tonnon Byers

== See also ==
- 2018 Wisconsin elections
  - 2018 Wisconsin State Senate election
- 2020 Wisconsin elections
  - 2020 Wisconsin State Senate election
  - 2020 Wisconsin State Assembly election
