= 2022 Wisconsin Senate election =

- November 8, 2022

17 of 33 seats in the Wisconsin State Senate 17 seats needed for a majority
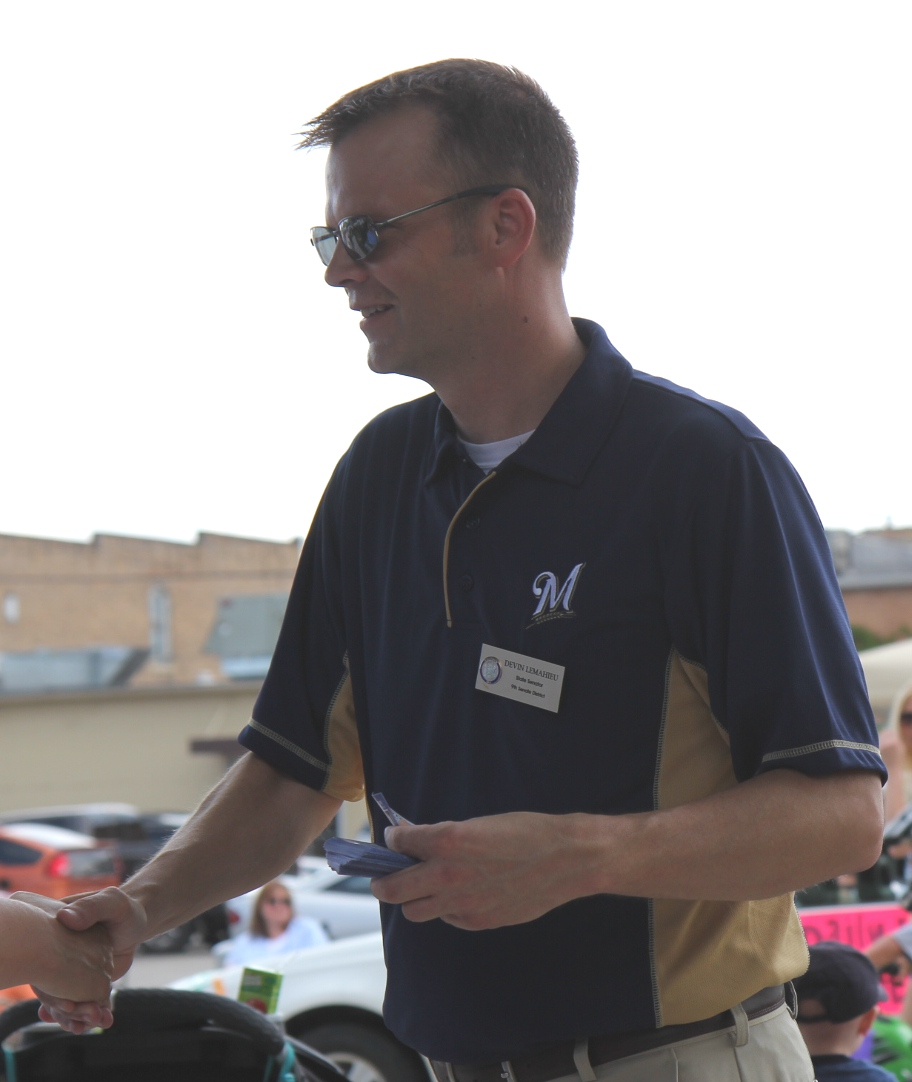

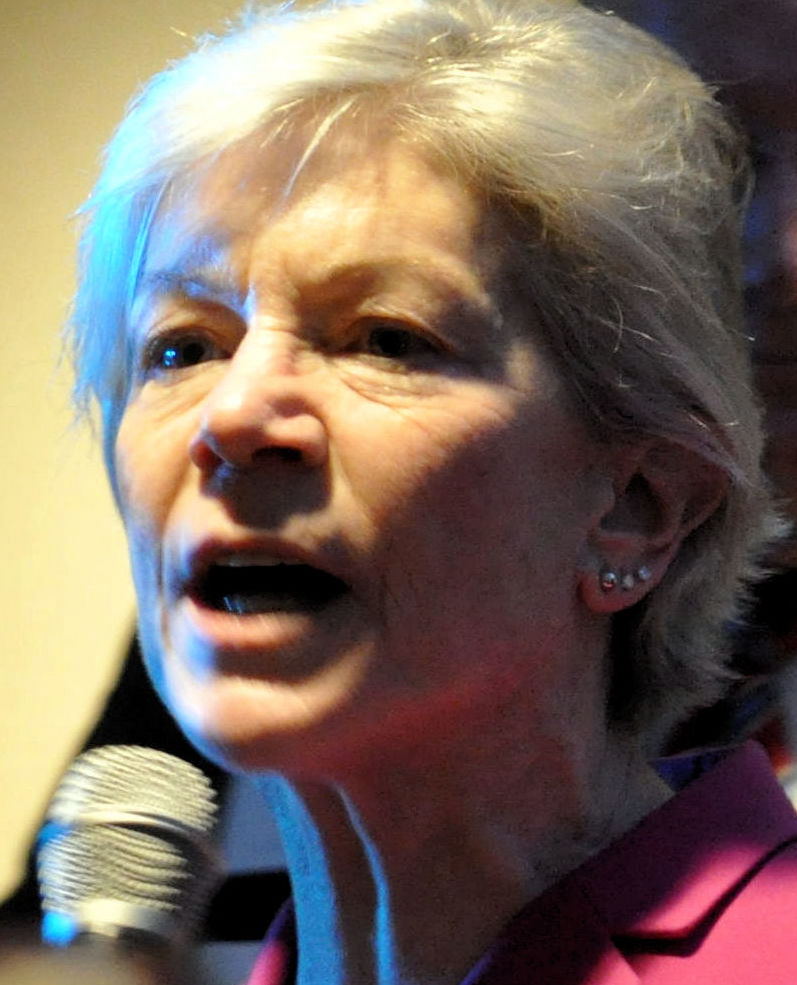
| | Majority party | Minority party |
|---|---|---|
| Leader | Devin LeMahieu | Janet Bewley (retired) |
| Party | Republican | Democratic |
| Leader since | January 4, 2021 | April 24, 2020 |
| Leader's seat | 9th–Oostburg | 25th–Mason |
| Last election | 10 seats, 53.8% | 6 seats, 45.3% |
| Seats before | 21 | 12 |
| Seats won | 12 | 5 |
| Seats after | 22 | 11 |
| Seat change | ▲1 | ▼1 |
| Popular vote | 772,131 | 475,900 |
| Percentage | 61.1% | 37.68% |
| Swing | ▲7.3 pp | ▼7.6 pp |
- Results of the elections: Republican hold Republican gain Democratic hold No election
President before election
Chris Kapenga
Republican
Elected President
Chris Kapenga
Republican

The 2022 Wisconsin Senate elections were held on Tuesday, November 8, 2022. 17 of the 33 seats in the Wisconsin State Senate were up for election—the odd-numbered districts. This was the first election to take place after redistricting following the 2020 United States census. This was the only election to take place under the redistricting plan set out in 2022. Before the election, 21 Senate seats were held by Republicans, and 12 seats were held by Democrats. 11 Republican seats and six Democratic seats were up in this election. The primary election took place on August 9, 2022.

Republicans flipped one Democratic-held Senate seat and achieved a two-thirds supermajority, entering the 106th Wisconsin Legislature with 22 of 33 State Senate seats.

== Results summary ==
| Seats | | Party (majority caucus shading) | | Total |
| Seats | | Democratic | Republican | Total |
|---|---|---|---|---|
| Last election (2020) | | 6 | 10 | 16 |
| Total after last election (2020) | | 12 | 21 | 33 |
| Total before this election | | 12 | 21 | 33 |
| Up for election | | 6 | 11 | 17 |
| of which: | Incumbent retiring | 3 | 4 | 7 |
| of which: | Vacated | 0 | 0 | 0 |
| of which: | Unopposed | 1 | 2 | 3 |
| This election | | 5 | 12 | 17 |
| Change from last election | | ▼1 | ▲1 | |
| Total after this election | | 11 | 22 | 33 |
| Change in total | | ▼1 | ▲1 | |

Source: https://elections.wi.gov/elections/election-results#accordion-5601

=== Close races ===
Seats where the margin of victory was under 10%:

1. State Senate district 31, 0.9%
2. State Senate district 5, 6.52%
3. State Senate district 19, 8.12%

== Outgoing incumbents ==
=== Retiring ===
- Kathy Bernier (R–Chippewa Falls), representing District 23 since 2018, announced in January 2022 that she would not seek reelection. Bernier had made news in 2021 by opposing her party's attempts to undermine the validity of the 2020 United States presidential election. Prominent Republicans loyal to Donald Trump had called for her to resign or be defeated.
- Janet Bewley (D–Mason), representing District 25 since 2014, announced on February 6, 2022, that she would not seek reelection.
- Jon Erpenbach (D–West Point), representing District 27 since 1998, announced on December 9, 2021, that he would not seek reelection.
- Dale Kooyenga (R–Brookfield), representing District 5 since 2018, announced in April 2022 that he would not run for a second term.
- Jerry Petrowski (R–Marathon), representing District 29 since 2012, announced on March 10, 2022, that he would not seek reelection.
- Janis Ringhand (D–Evansville), representing District 15 since 2014, announced on March 9, 2022, that she would not seek reelection.

=== Seeking other office ===
- Roger Roth (R–Appleton), representing District 19 since 2014, ran instead for lieutenant governor of Wisconsin.

== Predictions ==
| Source | Ranking | As of |
|---|---|---|
| Sabato's Crystal Ball | Safe R | May 19, 2022 |

== Race summary ==
| Dist. | Incumbent | | | | This race | |
| Dist. | Member | Party | First elected | Status | General | Result |
|---|---|---|---|---|---|---|
| 01 | André Jacque | Republican | 2018 | Running | ✓ André Jacque (Rep.) 59.49%; Andrea Gage-Michaels (Dem.) 40.45% | Incumbent re-elected |
| 03 | Tim Carpenter | Democratic | 2002 | Running | ✓ Tim Carpenter (Dem.) 68.98%; Angel Sanchez (Rep.) 30.93% | Incumbent re-elected |
| 05 | Dale Kooyenga | Republican | 2018 | Not running | ✓ Rob Hutton (Rep.) 53.24%; Jessica Katzenmeyer (Dem.) 46.66% | New member elected. Republican hold. |
| 07 | Chris Larson | Democratic | 2010 | Running | ✓ Chris Larson (Dem.) 67.25%; Peter Gilbert (Rep.) 32.64% | Incumbent re-elected |
| 09 | Devin LeMahieu | Republican | 2014 | Running | ✓ Devin LeMahieu (Rep.) 93.64% | Incumbent re-elected |
| 11 | Stephen Nass | Republican | 2014 | Running | ✓ Stephen Nass (Rep.) 58.31%; Steven J. Doelder (Dem.) 41.6% | Incumbent re-elected |
| 13 | John Jagler | Republican | 2021 (special) | Running | ✓ John Jagler (Rep.) 96.69% | Incumbent re-elected |
| 15 | Janis Ringhand | Democratic | 2014 | Not running | ✓ Mark Spreitzer (Dem.) 61.38%; Mark Trofimchuck (Rep.) 38.54% | New member elected. Democratic hold. |
| 17 | Howard Marklein | Republican | 2014 | Running | ✓ Howard Marklein (Rep.) 60.15%; Pat Skogen (Dem.) 39.82% | Incumbent re-elected |
| 19 | Roger Roth | Republican | 2014 | Running for lieutenant governor | ✓ Rachael Cabral-Guevara (Rep.) 54.02%; Kristin M. Alfheim (Dem.) 45.94% | New member elected. Republican hold. |
| 21 | Van H. Wanggaard | Republican | 2014 | Running | ✓ Van H. Wanggaard (Rep.) 94.14% | Incumbent re-elected |
| 23 | Kathy Bernier | Republican | 2018 | Not running | ✓ Jesse James (Rep.) 94.73% | New member elected. Republican hold. |
| 25 | Janet Bewley | Democratic | 2014 | Not running | ✓ Romaine Quinn (Rep.) 56.99%; Kelly Westlund (Dem.) 42.96% | New member elected. Republican gain. |
| 27 | Jon Erpenbach | Democratic | 1998 | Not running | ✓ Dianne Hesselbein (Dem.) 67.97%; Robert Relph (Rep.) 31.97% | New member elected. Democratic hold. |
| 29 | Jerry Petrowski | Republican | 2021 (recall) | Not running | ✓ Cory Tomczyk (Rep.) 62.43%; Bob Look (Dem.) 37.5% | New member elected. Republican hold. |
| 31 | Jeff Smith | Democratic | 2018 | Running | ✓ Jeff Smith (Dem.) 50.42%; David Estenson (Rep.) 49.52% | Incumbent re-elected |
| 33 | Chris Kapenga | Republican | 2015 | Running | ✓ Chris Kapenga (Rep.) 96.4% | Incumbent re-elected |

== Detailed results ==
=== District 1 ===
Incumbent Republican André Jacque ran for re-election. He defeated attorney Andrea Gage-Michaels by a 19-point margin.

District 1 general election
| Party | Candidate | Votes | % |
|---|---|---|---|
| Republican | André Jacque (incumbent) | 52,009 | 59.49 |
| Democratic | Andrea Gage-Michaels | 35,363 | 40.45 |
| Write-in | | 48 | 0.05 |
| Total votes | | 87,420 | 100.0 |

=== District 3 ===
Incumbent Democrat Tim Carpenter ran for re-election. He defeated Republican and perennial candidate Angel Sanchez by a wide margin.

District 3 general election
| Party | Candidate | Votes | % |
|---|---|---|---|
| Democratic | Tim Carpenter (incumbent) | 27,958 | 68.98 |
| Republican | Angel Sanchez | 12,536 | 30.93 |
| Write-in | | 39 | 0.10 |
| Total votes | | 40,533 | 100.0 |

=== District 5 ===
Incumbent Republican Dale Kooyenga declined to run for re-election. Former state legislator Rob Hutton defeated Democrat Jessica Katzenmeyer.

District 5 Democratic primary
| Party | Candidate | Votes | % |
|---|---|---|---|
| Democratic | Jessica Katzenmeyer | 9,086 | 54.24 |
| Democratic | Tom Palzewicz | 7,651 | 45.67 |
| Write-in | | 15 | 0.09 |
| Total votes | | 16,752 | 100.0 |

District 5 general election
| Party | Candidate | Votes | % |
|---|---|---|---|
| Republican | Rob Hutton | 49,025 | 53.24 |
| Democratic | Jessica Katzenmeyer | 42,962 | 46.66 |
| Write-in | | 97 | 0.11 |
| Total votes | | 92,084 | 100.0 |

=== District 7 ===
Incumbent Democrat Chris Larson ran for re-election. He defeated Republican Peter Gilbert.

District 7 Republican primary
| Party | Candidate | Votes | % |
|---|---|---|---|
| Republican | Peter Gilbert | 5,080 | 54.35 |
| Republican | Red Arnold | 4,209 | 45.03 |
| Write-in | | 58 | 0.62 |
| Total votes | | 9,347 | 100.0 |

District 7 general election
| Party | Candidate | Votes | % |
|---|---|---|---|
| Democratic | Chris Larson (incumbent) | 54,252 | 67.25 |
| Republican | Peter Gilbert | 26,333 | 32.64 |
| Write-in | | 85 | 0.11 |
| Total votes | | 80,670 | 100.0 |

=== District 9 ===
Incumbent Republican Devin LeMahieu ran for re-election unopposed. In the primary election he faced candidates Ruth Villareal and Jeanette Deschene in the primary.

District 9 Republican primary
| Party | Candidate | Votes | % |
|---|---|---|---|
| Republican | Devin LeMahieu (incumbent) | 16,963 | 71.36 |
| Republican | Ruth Villareal | 4,342 | 18.27 |
| Republican | Jeanette Deschene | 2,431 | 10.23 |
| Write-in | | 34 | 0.14 |
| Total votes | | 23,770 | 100.0 |

District 9 general election
| Party | Candidate | Votes | % |
|---|---|---|---|
| Republican | Devin LeMahieu (incumbent) | 57,836 | 93.64 |
| Democratic | Jarrod Schroeder (write-in) | 1,237 | 2.00 |
| Write-in | | 2,692 | 4.36 |
| Total votes | | 61,765 | 100.0 |

=== District 11 ===
Incumbent Republican Stephen Nass ran for re-election. He defeated Democrat Steven J. Doelder by a 17-point margin.

District 11 general election
| Party | Candidate | Votes | % |
|---|---|---|---|
| Republican | Stephen Nass (incumbent) | 44,974 | 58.31 |
| Democratic | Steven J. Doelder | 32,087 | 41.60 |
| Write-in | | 62 | 0.08 |
| Total votes | | 77,123 | 100.0 |

=== District 13 ===
Incumbent Republican John Jagler ran for re-election unopposed.

District 13 general election
| Party | Candidate | Votes | % |
|---|---|---|---|
| Republican | John Jagler (incumbent) | 61,817 | 96.69 |
| Write-in | | 2,118 | 3.31 |
| Total votes | | 63,935 | 100.0 |

=== District 15 ===
Incumbent Democrat Janis Ringhand declined to seek re-election. State legislator Mark Spreitzer defeated Republican Mark Trofimchuck by a wide margin.

District 15 general election
| Party | Candidate | Votes | % |
|---|---|---|---|
| Democratic | Mark Spreitzer | 46,192 | 61.38 |
| Republican | Mark Trofimchuck | 29,006 | 38.54 |
| Write-in | | 62 | 0.08 |
| Total votes | | 75,260 | 100.0 |

=== District 17 ===
Incumbent Republican Howard Marklein ran for re-election. He defeated Democrat Pat Skogen by a wide margin.

District 17 general election
| Party | Candidate | Votes | % |
|---|---|---|---|
| Republican | Howard Marklein (incumbent) | 44,405 | 60.15 |
| Democratic | Pat Skogen | 29,398 | 39.82 |
| Write-in | | 22 | 0.03 |
| Total votes | | 73,825 | 100.0 |

=== District 19 ===
Incumbent Republican Roger Roth declined to seek re-election, instead running for Lieutenant governor. State representative Rachael Cabral-Guevara defeated Appleton Common Councilmember Kristin Alfheim by a nine-point margin.

District 19 Republican primary
| Party | Candidate | Votes | % |
|---|---|---|---|
| Republican | Rachael Cabral-Guevara | 11,905 | 63.57 |
| Republican | Andrew K. Thomsen | 6,806 | 36.34 |
| Write-in | | 16 | 0.09 |
| Total votes | | 18,727 | 100.0 |

District 19 general election
| Party | Candidate | Votes | % |
|---|---|---|---|
| Republican | Rachael Cabral-Guevara | 42,858 | 54.02 |
| Democratic | Kristin Alfheim | 36,447 | 45.94 |
| Write-in | | 33 | 0.04 |
| Total votes | | 79,338 | 100.0 |

=== District 21 ===
Incumbent Republican Van H. Wanggaard ran for re-election unopposed.

District 21 Republican primary
| Party | Candidate | Votes | % |
|---|---|---|---|
| Republican | Van H. Wanggaard (incumbent) | 20,194 | 74.56 |
| Republican | Jay Stone | 6,831 | 25.22 |
| Write-in | | 58 | 0.21 |
| Total votes | | 27,083 | 100.0 |

District 21 general election
| Party | Candidate | Votes | % |
|---|---|---|---|
| Republican | Van H. Wanggaard (incumbent) | 61,621 | 94.14 |
| Write-in | | 3,838 | 5.86 |
| Total votes | | 65,459 | 100.0 |

=== District 23 ===
Incumbent Republican Kathy Bernier declined to seek re-election. Republican Jesse James defeated challengers Brian Westrate and Sandra Scholz. James was unopposed in the general election.

District 23 Republican primary
| Party | Candidate | Votes | % |
|---|---|---|---|
| Republican | Jesse James | 10,411 | 49.99 |
| Republican | Brian Westrate | 7,809 | 37.50 |
| Republican | Sandra Scholz | 2,588 | 12.43 |
| Write-in | | 18 | 0.09 |
| Total votes | | 20,826 | 100.0 |

District 23 general election
| Party | Candidate | Votes | % |
|---|---|---|---|
| Republican | Jesse James | 56,391 | 94.73 |
| Write-in | | 3,136 | 5.27 |
| Total votes | | 59,527 | 100.0 |

=== District 25 ===
County results: Quinn—50–60% Quinn—60–70% Westlund—50–60%

Incumbent Democrat Janet Bewley declined to seek re-election. Former Republican legislator Romaine Quinn defeated Democrat Kelly Westlund by a 14-point margin.

District 25 general election
| Party | Candidate | Votes | % |
|---|---|---|---|
| Republican | Romaine Quinn | 47,293 | 56.99 |
| Democratic | Kelly Westlund | 35,652 | 42.96 |
| Write-in | | 39 | 0.05 |
| Total votes | | 82,984 | 100.0 |

=== District 27 ===
Incumbent Democrat Jon Erpenbach declined to seek re-election. Democratic state representative Dianne Hesselbein defeated Republican Robert Relph by a wide margin.

District 27 general election
| Party | Candidate | Votes | % |
|---|---|---|---|
| Democratic | Dianne Hesselbein | 65,618 | 67.97 |
| Republican | Robert Relph | 30,863 | 31.97 |
| Write-in | | 53 | 0.05 |
| Total votes | | 96,534 | 100.0 |

=== District 29 ===
Incumbent Republican Jerry Petrowski declined to seek re-election. Republican Cory Tomczyk defeated Mosinee mayor Brent Jacobson and realtor Jon P. Kaiser in the primary. Tomczyk defeated Democrat Bob Look in the general election by a wide margin.

District 29 Republican primary
| Party | Candidate | Votes | % |
|---|---|---|---|
| Republican | Cory Tomczyk | 10,419 | 43.11 |
| Republican | Brent Jacobson | 9,302 | 38.49 |
| Republican | Jon P. Kaiser | 4,428 | 18.32 |
| Write-in | | 18 | 0.07 |
| Total votes | | 24,167 | 100.0 |

District 29 general election
| Party | Candidate | Votes | % |
|---|---|---|---|
| Republican | Cory Tomczyk | 49,602 | 62.43 |
| Democratic | Bob Look | 29,798 | 37.50 |
| Write-in | | 54 | 0.07 |
| Total votes | | 79,454 | 100.0 |

=== District 31 ===
Incumbent Republican Jeff Smith ran for re-election. He defeated Republican David Estenson by a 0.9% margin.

District 31 general election
| Party | Candidate | Votes | % |
|---|---|---|---|
| Democratic | Jeff Smith (incumbent) | 38,936 | 50.42 |
| Republican | David Estenson | 38,239 | 49.52 |
| Write-in | | 48 | 0.06 |
| Total votes | | 77,223 | 100.0 |

=== District 33 ===
Incumbent Republican Chris Kapenga ran for re-election unopposed.

District 31 general election
| Party | Candidate | Votes | % |
|---|---|---|---|
| Republican | Chris Kapenga (incumbent) | 67,323 | 96.40 |
| Write-in | | 2,515 | 3.60 |
| Total votes | | 69,838 | 100.0 |

== See also ==
- Republican efforts to restrict voting following the 2020 presidential election: Wisconsin
- 2022 Wisconsin elections
  - 2022 Wisconsin gubernatorial election
  - 2022 Wisconsin Attorney General election
  - 2022 Wisconsin State Assembly election
  - 2022 United States House of Representatives elections in Wisconsin
- 2022 United States elections
- Wisconsin Senate
- Elections in Wisconsin
- Redistricting in Wisconsin
