= 2014 Wisconsin Senate election =

- November 4, 2014

17 of 33 seats in the Wisconsin Senate 17 seats needed for a majority
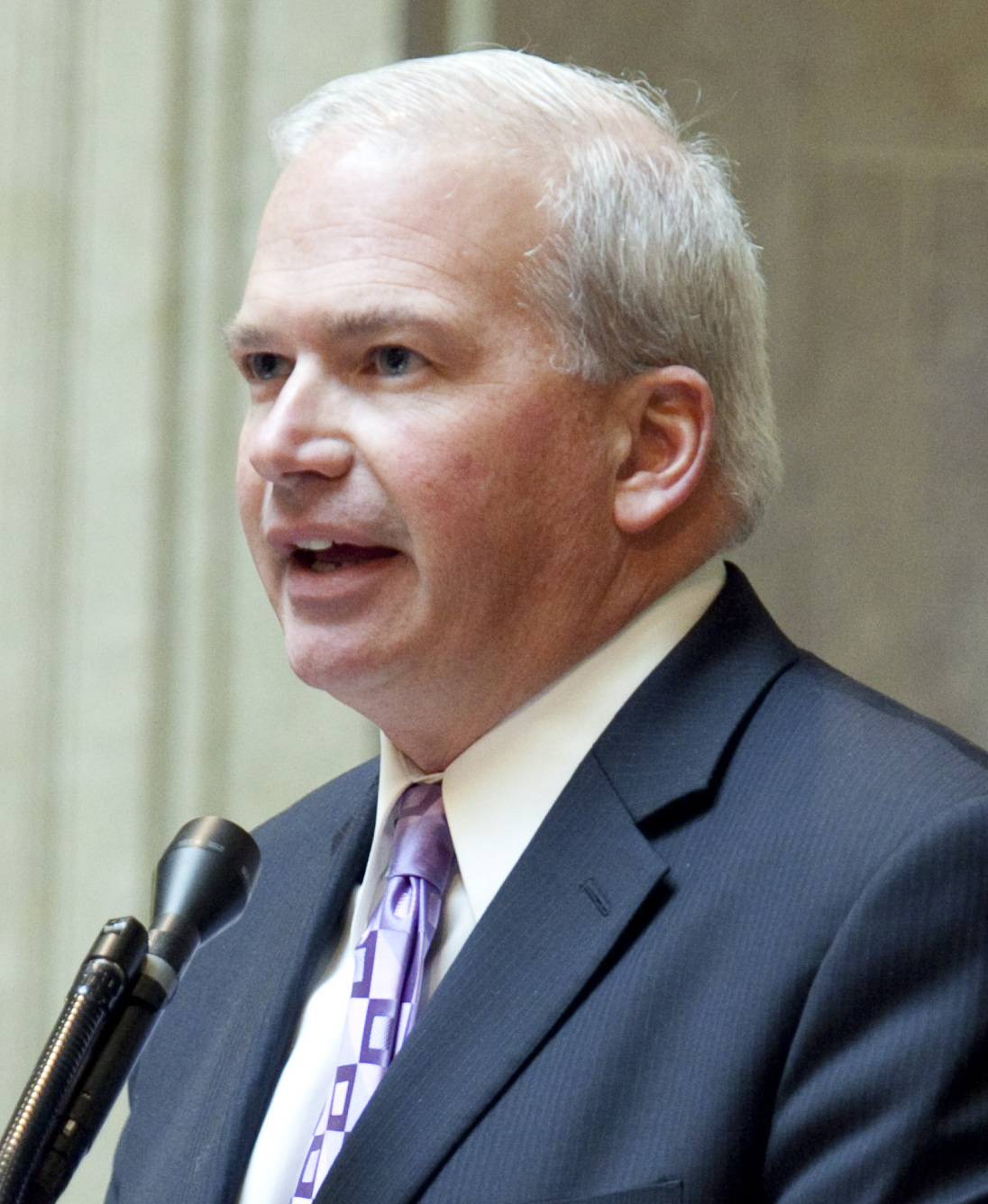

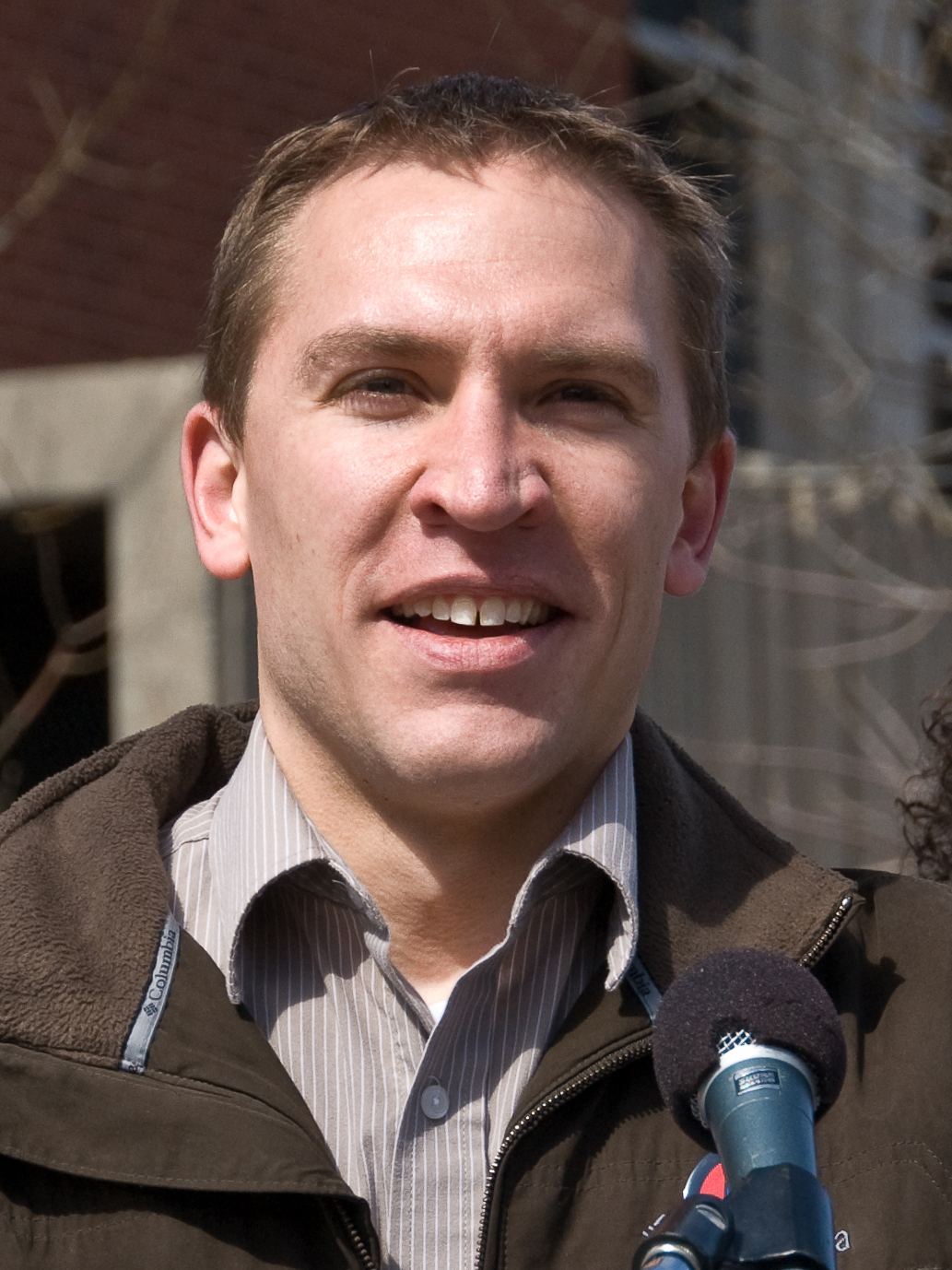
	Majority party	Minority party
Leader	Scott Fitzgerald	Chris Larson (retired as leader)
Party	Republican	Democratic
Leader since	January 1, 2007	January 3, 2013
Leader's seat	13th–Juneau	7th–Milwaukee
Last election	8 seats, 45.28%	8 seats, 53.13%
Seats before	18	15
Seats won	11	6
Seats after	19	14
Seat change	▲1	▼1
Popular vote	623,358	529,906
Percentage	53.87%	45.80%
Swing	▲8.59 pp	▼7.33 pp
- Results of the elections: Republican hold Republican gain Democratic hold No election
President before election
Michael G. Ellis
Republican
Elected President
Mary Lazich
Republican

The 2014 Wisconsin Senate elections were held on Tuesday, November 4, 2014, at the Fall general election in Wisconsin. Seventeen of the 33 seats in the Wisconsin Senate were up for election—the odd-numbered districts. Before the election, Republicans held 17 seats, Democrats held 15 seats, and 1 seat was vacant. Of the seats up for election, 7 were held by Democrats, 9 were held by Republicans, and 1 was vacant due to the resignation of a Republican member. The primary election was held on August 12, 2014.

Republicans maintained control of the Senate, flipping one Democrat-held seat. They were set to enter the 102nd Wisconsin Legislature with 19 of 33 Senate seats, but one Republican Senator resigned after the election, leaving them with 18 seats at the start of the legislative term.

Elected members took office on January 5, 2015.

== Results summary ==
Seats		Party (majority caucus shading)		Total
Seats		Democratic	Republican	Total
Last election (2012)		8	8	16
Total after last election (2012)		15	18	33
Total before this election		15	17	32
Up for election		7	10	17
of which:	Incumbent retiring	3	3	6
of which:	Vacated	0	1	1
of which:	Unopposed	2	0	2
This election		6	11	17
Change from last election		▼1	▲1	
Total after this election		14	19	33
Change in total		▼1	▲2	

Popular vote
Republican	53.87%
Democratic	45.80%
Other	0.33%

Senate seats won
Republican	64.71%
Democratic	35.29%

=== Close races ===
Seats where the margin of victory was under 10%:

1. State Senate district 25, 2.35%
2. State Senate district 31, 4.70%

== Predictions ==
Source	Ranking	As of
Governing	Lean R	October 20, 2014

== Outgoing incumbents ==
=== Retired ===
- Timothy Cullen (D–Janesville), representing District 15, did not run for re-election.
- Michael Ellis (R–Neenah), representing District 19, did not run for re-election.
- Robert Jauch (D–Poplar), representing District 25, did not run for re-election.
- Dale Schultz (R–Richland Center), representing District 17, did not run for re-election.

=== Seeking other office ===
- John Lehman (D–Racine), representing District 21, ran for lieutenant governor of Wisconsin.
- Joe Leibham (R–Sheboygan), representing District 9, ran for U.S. House of Representatives in Wisconsin's 5th congressional district, but lost in the primary.

=== Vacated ===
- Neal Kedzie (R–Elkhorn), resigned from District 11.

== Candidates and results ==
Dist.	Incumbent				This race	
Dist.	Member	Party	First elect	Status	Candidates	Results
01	Frank Lasee	Republican	2010	Ran	✓ Frank Lasee (Rep.) 61.59%; Dean P. Debroux (Dem.) 38.37%	Incumbent re-elected
03	Tim Carpenter	Democratic	2002	Ran	✓ Tim Carpenter (Dem.) 97.1%	Incumbent re-elected
05	Leah Vukmir	Republican	2010	Ran	✓ Leah Vukmir (Rep.) 73.03%; Wendy Friedrich (Dem.) 26.17%	Incumbent re-elected
07	Chris Larson	Democratic	2010	Ran	✓ Chris Larson (Dem.) 59.5%; Jason Red Arnold (Rep.) 40.26%	Incumbent re-elected
09	Joe Leibham	Republican	2010	Ran for U.S. House of Representatives	✓ Devin LeMahieu (Rep.) 59.95%; Martha Laning (Dem.) 39.94%	Incumbent retired to run for U.S. House; New member elected Republican hold
11	--Vacant--				✓ Stephen Nass (Rep.) 63.29%; Dan Kilkenny (Dem.) 36.63%	Incumbent resigned New member elected Republican hold
13	Scott Fitzgerald	Republican	1994	Ran	✓ Scott Fitzgerald (Rep.) 62.69%; Michelle Zahn (Dem.) 37.28%	Incumbent re-elected
15	Timothy Cullen	Democratic	1974 (2010)	Did not run	✓ Janis Ringhand (Dem.) 59.47%; Brian Fitzgerald (Rep.) 40.47%	Incumbent retired New member elected Democratic hold
17	Dale Schultz	Republican	1991	Did not run	✓ Howard Marklein (Rep.) 55.07%; Pat Bomhack (Dem.) 44.85%	Incumbent retired New member elected Republican hold
19	Michael Ellis	Republican	1982	Did not run	✓ Roger Roth (Rep.) 57.17%; Penny Bernard Schaber (Dem.) 42.76%	Incumbent retired New member elected Republican hold
21	John Lehman	Democratic	2006 (2012)	Ran for lieutenant governor	✓ Van Wanggaard (Rep.) 61.42%; Randy Bryce (Dem.) 38.39%	Incumbent retired to run for lieutenant governor New member elected Republican gain
23	Terry Moulton	Republican	2010	Ran	✓ Terry Moulton (Rep.) 61.15%; Phil Swanhorst (Dem.) 38.84%	Incumbent re-elected
25	Robert Jauch	Democratic	1986	Did not run	✓ Janet Bewley (Dem.) 51.16%; Dane Deutsch (Rep.) 48.81%	Incumbent retired New member elected Democratic hold
27	Jon Erpenbach	Democratic	1986	Ran	✓ Jon Erpenbach (Dem.) 97.51%	Incumbent re-elected
29	Jerry Petrowski	Republican	2012	Ran	✓ Jerry Petrowski (Rep.) 65.73%; Paul Demain (Dem.) 34.26%	Incumbent re-elected
31	Kathleen Vinehout	Democratic	2006	Ran	✓ Kathleen Vinehout (Dem.) 52.32%; Mel Pittman (Rep.) 47.62%	Incumbent re-elected
33	Paul Farrow	Republican	2012	Ran	✓ Paul Farrow (Rep.) 73.86%; Sherryll Shaddock (Dem.) 26.07%	Incumbent re-elected

== See also ==
- 2014 Wisconsin elections
  - 2014 Wisconsin gubernatorial election
  - 2014 Wisconsin Attorney General election
  - 2014 Wisconsin State Assembly election
  - 2014 United States House of Representatives elections in Wisconsin
- 2014 United States elections
- Wisconsin Senate
- Elections in Wisconsin
- Redistricting in Wisconsin
