= Brent Jacobson =

American politician (born 1984)

Member of the Wisconsin State Assembly from the 87th district
- Incumbent
- Assumed office January 6, 2025
- Preceded by: James W. Edming

Mayor of Mosinee, Wisconsin
- In office April 21, 2015 – December 9, 2024
- Preceded by: Alan Erickson
- Succeeded by: Peter Nievinski

Member of the Board of Supervisors of Marathon County, Wisconsin, from the 26th district
- In office April 2020 – April 2022
- Preceded by: John Durham
- Succeeded by: Jean R. Maszk

Personal details
- Born: April 26, 1984 (age 42) Wausau, Wisconsin
- Party: Republican
- Spouse: Tessa Marie
- Children: 1
- Parent: James B. Jacobson (father)
- Education: Saint Cloud State University (B.S.); West Virginia University College of Law (J.D.)
- Profession: Lawyer
- Website: Campaign website

Brent William Jacobson (born April 26, 1984) is an American lawyer and Republican politician from Mosinee, Wisconsin. He is a member of the Wisconsin State Assembly, and represents Wisconsin's 87th Assembly district in the 2025–2026 term. He served as mayor of Mosinee, from 2015 until 2025, and was formerly a member of the board of supervisors of Marathon County, Wisconsin.

His father, James B. Jacobson, also served as mayor of Mosinee and a member of the city council.

== Early life and education ==
Brent Jacobson was born in Wausau, Wisconsin, in April 1984. He was raised and educated in neighboring Mosinee, Wisconsin, graduating from Mosinee High School in 2002. He went on to attend Saint Cloud State University, earning his bachelor's degree in business management in 2006. He immediately went on to law school, obtaining his J.D. from West Virginia University College of Law in 2009. After working for a short time as a commercial litigator in Pennsylvania, Jacobson returned to Wisconsin in 2011, joining the law firm Anderson, O'Brien, Bertz, Skrenes, & Golla (now Anderson O'Brien LLP).

== Political career ==
Jacobson made his first bid for public office in 2015, challenging 10-year incumbent Mosinee mayor Alan Erickson. Jacobson stunned Erickson in the general election, taking 71% of the vote. He was re-elected without opposition in 2017, 2019, 2021, and 2023.

After winning his second term as mayor, Jacobson announced that he would run for Wisconsin State Assembly, launching a primary challenge against three-term incumbent John Spiros in the 86th Assembly district. The 86th district then comprised much of central Marathon County, excluding the city of Wausau. Jacobson said he was running to protest the wasteful spending policies of his own party, and highlighted what he saw as deficiencies in the state's Foxconn in Wisconsin project. Spiros won the primary with nearly 65% of the vote.

The following year, after Wisconsin U.S. representative Sean Duffy announced his early resignation from office, Jacobson openly considered a run to succeed him in Congress, but ultimately did not enter the race. Instead, he ran for an open seat on the board of supervisors of Marathon County, Wisconsin, and won the seat without opposition in the spring 2020 election.

In 2022, state senator Jerry Petrowski announced he would not run for re-election to the Wisconsin Senate. Jacobson announced in March 2022 that he would run to succeed Petrowski in the 29th Senate district. Two other Republicans entered the race, and Jacobson ultimately lost the primary to businessman Cory Tomczyk.

In 2024, the Wisconsin Legislature adopted a dramatic redistricting act, after the Wisconsin Supreme Court struck down the decade-old Republican gerrymander. Legislative districts in Marathon County were significantly affected by the redistricting; Mosinee was drawn into the new 87th Assembly district, along with the southeast quadrant of Marathon County and parts of neighboring Shawano, Waupaca, and Portage counties. The 85th district incumbent, Patrick Snyder, was drawn into the new 87th district, but announced quickly that he would relocate in order to maintain residency in the redrawn 85th district, leaving an open seat in the 87th. Jacobson announced in February 2024 that he would run for state Assembly in the open 87th district seat. Once again he faced a contested primary in the overwhelmingly Republican district, but this time he prevailed by a wide margin against Wausau School Board member Cory Sillars. He won the general election with 66% of the vote. He took office in January 2025.

== Personal life and family ==
Brent Jacobson is youngest of three children born to James B. Jacobson and Sandra A. (née Ostrowski).

Brent Jacobson lives in Mosinee with his wife, Tessa, and their child.

== Electoral history ==
=== Wisconsin Assembly, 86th district (2018) ===
Year	Election	Date	Elected				Defeated				Total	Plurality
2018	Primary	Aug. 14	John Spiros (inc)	Republican	3,855	64.67%	Brent Jacobson	Rep.	2,103	35.28%	5,961	1,752

=== Wisconsin Senate, 29th district (2022) ===
Year	Election	Date	Elected				Defeated				Total	Plurality
2022	Primary	Aug. 9	Cory Tomczyk	Republican	10,419	43.11%	Brent Jacobson	Rep.	9,302	38.49%	24,167	1,117
2022	Primary	Aug. 9	Cory Tomczyk	Republican	10,419	43.11%	Jon P. Kaiser	Rep.	4,428	18.32%	24,167	1,117

=== Wisconsin Assembly, 87th district (2024) ===
Year	Election	Date	Elected				Defeated				Total	Plurality
2024	Primary	Aug. 13	Brent Jacobson	Republican	6,065	73.92%	Cory Sillars	Rep.	2,107	25.68%	8,205	3,958
2024	General	Nov. 5	Brent Jacobson	Republican	23,885	66.00%	William Switalla	Dem.	12,273	33.91%	36,192	11,612

Political offices
Preceded by Alan Erickson	Mayor of Mosinee, Wisconsin; April 21, 2015 – April 15, 2025	Succeeded by Peter Nievinski
