= Cory Tomczyk =

21st century American politician

Member of the Wisconsin Senate from the 29th district
- Incumbent
- Assumed office January 3, 2023
- Preceded by: Jerry Petrowski

Personal details
- Born: October 26, 1962 (age 63) Rudolph, Wisconsin, U.S.
- Party: Republican
- Spouse: Rebecca L. Miller (m. 1983)
- Children: 2
- Occupation: Businessman
- Website: Official website; Campaign website

Cory Lee Tomczyk (born October 26, 1962) is an American businessman and Republican politician from Marathon County, Wisconsin. He is a member of the Wisconsin Senate, representing Wisconsin's 29th Senate district since January 2023. He previously served 13 years on the Mosinee School Board, and was president of the school board from 2010 to 2015.

== Early life and career ==
Cory Tomczyk was born in Rudolph, Wisconsin, and raised in the Wisconsin Rapids area; he graduated from Lincoln High School in Wisconsin Rapids in 1980.

After high school, he briefly resided in Watertown, Wisconsin, but then moved to the northern Wisconsin area where he now resides, settling in Mosinee, Wisconsin—outside Wausau—in 1988. He worked at the time as a district manager of Burger King restaurants. In June 1990, he started his own business, Industrial Recyclers of Wisconsin (IROW), which handled wastepaper collection for recycling. The business subsequently expanded to recycling many other types of materials. He later commented that he had the idea to start the business in response to growing state recycling mandates. Industrial Recyclers of Wisconsin thrived and has been his primary occupation since that time, expanding to manage local recycling facilities around northern Wisconsin. He later expanded into laser printer recharging with a separate business known as Image Charge.

Through his business interests, Tomczyk became active in local business organizations. In 1998, IROW was named the Wausau area small business of the year by the Wausau Area Chamber of Commerce.

== Political career ==
As his business expanded and his profile grew, Tomczyk became increasingly active in local and regional political affairs and was an active member of the Republican Party of Wisconsin. He earned his first public office in 2006, when he joined the Mosinee School Board as an at-large member. He ultimately served on the school board until 2019 and was president of the board from 2010 to 2015.

During the first wave of the COVID-19 pandemic in Wisconsin—in early 2020—Tomczyk became active in the backlash against public health measures intended to slow the spread of the virus. He was active in Open Wisconsin Now, an organization which lobbied Governor Tony Evers to lift stay-at-home orders.

=== Wausau Pilot lawsuit (2021–2024) ===
In August 2021, witnesses at a Wausau County board meeting reported that Tomczyk referred to a 13-year-old as a "fag". A local newssite, the Wausau Pilot & Review reported on the use of the homophobic slur. Tomczyk demanded a retraction and later sued The Wausau Pilot & Review. His case was dismissed in April 2023 when a judge ruled that he had not been defamed. Tomczyk appealed against the dismissal of his lawsuit, but the 3rd district Wisconsin Court of Appeals concurred with the trial judge.

Tomczyk has reportedly regularly used homophobic slurs when dealing with interpersonal stress.

=== State Senate (2022–present) ===
In March 2022, incumbent state senator Jerry Petrowski announced he would not run for re-election in the 29th Senate district. The 29th Senate district then comprised much of Tomczyk's home county, Marathon, along with neighboring Taylor, Rusk, and Sawyer counties. Tomczyk announced his candidacy to succeed Petrowski in May 2022, highlighting his long business career, his support of gun rights, and his activism against COVID-19 lockdowns. The district was considered safely Republican, and Tomcyk faced a competitive primary against two other opponents—Brent Jacobson, then the mayor of Mosinee, and Jon P. Kaiser, a realtor from Rusk County. Kaiser's campaign was stung by reports of a drunk driving arrest earlier that year; the race was closely contested between Tomczyk and Jacobson, but Tomczyk prevailed by 1,117 votes, receiving 43% in the primary. He went on to face Democrat Bob Look, and won the general election with 62% of the vote.

He took office in January 2023, at the start of the 106th Wisconsin Legislature, and during his first term he was made chair of the Senate Committee on Transportation and Local Government. He maintained that chairmanship in the 107th Wisconsin Legislature, and is also vice chair of the Senate Committee on Agriculture and Revenue.

In 2023, the Wisconsin Supreme Court struck down Wisconsin's legislative district map and ordered new maps drawn. The new maps substantially reshaped Tomczyk's district, shifting it from Marathon and its northwestern neighbors to a more compact district covering most of central and southern Marathon County, along with the northern halves of Wood and Portage counties, and western parts of Shawano and Waupaca counties. Although the geography of the district was significantly changed, the political orientation remains safely Republican.

== Personal life and family ==
Cory Tomczyk married Rebecca "Becky" Miller in 1983. Becky is a co-owner of Tomczyk's businesses. They have two adult children and three grandchildren.

== Electoral history ==
=== Wisconsin Senate (2022, 2026) ===
Year	Election	Date	Elected				Defeated				Total	Plurality
2022	Primary	Aug. 9	Cory Tomczyk	Republican	10,419	43.11%	Brent Jacobson	Rep.	9,302	38.49%	24,167	1,117
2022	Primary	Aug. 9	Cory Tomczyk	Republican	10,419	43.11%	Jon P. Kaiser	Rep.	4,428	18.32%	24,167	1,117
2022	General	Nov. 8	Cory Tomczyk	Republican	49,602	62.43%	Bob Look	Dem.	29,798	37.50%	79,454	19,804

Wisconsin Senate
Preceded by Jerry Petrowski	Member of the Wisconsin Senate from the 29th district January 3, 2023 – present	Incumbent
