= Chris Kapenga =

American politician (born 1972)

President of the Wisconsin Senate
- In office January 4, 2021 – January 6, 2025
- Preceded by: Roger Roth
- Succeeded by: Mary Felzkowski

Member of the Wisconsin Senate from the 33rd district
- Incumbent
- Assumed office August 6, 2015
- Preceded by: Paul Farrow

Member of the Wisconsin State Assembly
- In office January 7, 2013 – August 6, 2015
- Preceded by: Don Pridemore
- Succeeded by: Cindi Duchow
- Constituency: 99th district
- In office January 3, 2011 – January 7, 2013
- Preceded by: Scott Newcomer
- Succeeded by: Stephen Nass
- Constituency: 33rd district

Personal details
- Born: Christopher Lee Kapenga; February 19, 1972 (age 54) Zeeland, Michigan, U.S.
- Party: Republican
- Education: Calvin College (BS)
- Website: State Senate website

Christopher Lee Kapenga (born February 19, 1972) is an American businessman and Republican politician from Waukesha County, Wisconsin. He is a member of the Wisconsin Senate, representing Wisconsin's 33rd Senate district since August 2015; he served as president of the Senate for the 2021–2022 and 2023–2024 terms. Before being elected to the Senate, he served two and a half terms in the Wisconsin State Assembly (2011–2015).

== Early life, education, and early career ==
Chris Kapenga was born in Zeeland, Michigan, on February 19, 1972. He earned his bachelor's degree in accounting from Calvin College and subsequently worked as an accountant. He owned a business, Integrated Time Systems, that provided timekeeping systems (software and hardware) to businesses. He sold the business in 2019 to Ascentis Corp. In 2014, Kapenga invested in Eye Care of Wisconsin, an optometrist network; his wife ran the business's operation and Kapenga became its registered agent.

== Political career ==
=== State Assembly ===
Kapenga made his first run for public office in 2010, running for Wisconsin State Assembly in the 33rd district. He sought to succeed Republican Scott Newcomer, who had declined to run for reelection. The 33rd district then comprised part of western Waukesha County, including Kapenga's home city of Delafield, the neighboring villages of Hartland, Chenequa, Wales, and North Prairie, and part of the city of Waukesha. Ultimately, three other candidates ran for the Republican nomination. Kapenga prevailed with 40% of the vote; his nearest challenger in the primary was former police officer Brian Dorow, who received 34.5%. Kapenga faced no opponent in the general election.

The 2010 election resulted in Republicans gaining full control of Wisconsin state government. They used that power in 2011 to enact a new redistricting law now regarded as one of the most dramatic partisan gerrymanders in United States history. Kapenga's region was significantly affected by the redistricting; he was drawn out of the 33rd Assembly district and drawn into the 99th Assembly district. His new district kept Delafield, Hartland, Chenequa, Wales, and North Prairie, removed areas of the city of Waukesha, and added neighboring Oconomowoc Lake and Dousman.

As a state representative, Kapenga was a major advocate for enacting a right-to-work law and for repealing the Wisconsin prevailing wage law, which sets a minimum pay for contractors hired to construct public works.

In August 2012, Wisconsin state senator Rich Zipperer resigned his seat to accept a job in the administration of Governor Scott Walker. Kapenga entered the race to succeed him in the Wisconsin Senate. Due to the timing of Zipperer's resignation, the special primary was scheduled to coincide with the Fall general election, November 6, 2012. Kapenga, therefore, appeared on the November ballot in the general election for state Assembly and in the special primary for state Senate. At the time, the 33rd Senate district comprised most of central Waukesha County, including the cities of Waukesha, Pewaukee, and Delafield. Kapenga was opposed in the Republican primary by neighboring state representative Paul Farrow (R–Pewaukee). At the November election, Kapenga easily won his Assembly election but lost the Senate primary, falling 2,900 votes short of Farrow. Kapenga easily won a third term in the Assembly in 2014, defeating Democrat Alice Jensen with 78% of the vote.

=== State Senate ===
Farrow, who had defeated Kapenga in the 2012 Senate primary, was elected Waukesha County executive in April 2015 and would therefore have to resign his seat in the Legislature. Two days after the county executive election, Kapenga announced he would run in the special election to succeed Farrow in the Wisconsin Senate. Several prominent Waukesha County Republicans initially expressed interest in the seat, but ultimately only two others entered the race. Again, Kapenga's strongest primary challenger was former police officer Brian Dorow, whose wife, Jennifer Dorow, had been appointed a Waukesha County circuit judge in the intervening years since their 2010 Assembly primary. In a close race, Kapenga prevailed again with 52% of the vote. In the July 2015 special election, Kapenga faced Democrat Sherryll Shaddock, who had previously run unsuccessfully against Paul Farrow. Kapenga easily prevailed, taking 72% of the vote in the overwhelmingly Republican district. He ran unopposed for re-election in 2018 and 2022.

In a 2015 Senate debate, Kapenga supported changes to state campaign finance laws to allow more money in elections, twice saying, "The more money in politics, the better." Also in 2015, Kapenga tweeted that he agreed that a Muslim should not be president, before later deleting the post after he was asked about it by the press.

In 2016, Kapenga—along with state representative Robert Brooks (R–Saukville)—introduced legislation to allow Wisconsin landowners to excavate Native American effigy mounds on their property. Under the bill, the Wisconsin Historical Society would allow landowners to excavate to determine whether human remains were present on effigy mounds, and—if no such remains were found—landowners could use the land as they wished. The bill was strongly opposed by the Ho-Chunk Nation and other tribes who viewed excavation to determine the presence of remains as defeating the purpose of mound protection. Assembly Speaker Robin Vos (R–Rochester) blocked the bill from consideration.

In 2017, Kapenga was one of two Senate Republicans to join Democrats in voting against a proposed state constitutional amendment to eliminate the position of State Treasurer of Wisconsin. The measure passed the Senate on an 18–15 vote. The proposed amendment was defeated by voters at the 2018 general election.

In the Senate, Kapenga has been a longtime supporter of legislation to allow Tesla, Inc., to open dealerships in Wisconsin, repealing a provision of Wisconsin state law that bars automakers from controlling or directly operating dealerships. Kapenga owns a business, Integrity Motorsports LLC, that sells Tesla parts and Tesla salvage vehicles. In 2019, the Tesla provision was added to a state budget bill, winning Kapenga's vote. Kapenga had introduced legislation to change the law to allow Tesla to open dealerships in two previous legislative sessions, but the proposals did not pass. Kapenga described himself as a hobbyist and said that he would not personally profit from the change in the law.

After longtime U.S. representative Jim Sensenbrenner announced his retirement in 2019, Kapenga entertained the possibility that he would run to succeed him representing Wisconsin's 5th congressional district. He ultimately chose not to run.

Like most Republican state legislators in Wisconsin, Kapenga has consistently opposed Democratic proposals to accept federal funds to expand Medicaid to cover more uninsured Wisconsinites.

In October 2020, during the COVID-19 pandemic in Wisconsin, Kapenga claimed, contrary to public health experts, that face masks were not effective in halting the spread of the coronavirus. Kapenga also said that he did not trust data showing a dire strain on Wisconsin hospital capacity. Kapenga also opposed a statewide order issued by Governor Tony Evers requiring the wearing of face coverings in indoor public places, calling the order "illegal."

After the November 2020 general election, Kapenga was elected by the Senate Republican caucus to be president of the Senate for the 2021–2022 legislative term. Days later, Kapenga spoke at a rally supporting defeated presidential candidate Donald Trump, who at that time was still contesting the results of the 2020 presidential election in Wisconsin. At the event, former Milwaukee County sheriff David Clarke called for the Proud Boys—a violent right-wing extremist group—to establish a chapter in Wisconsin. The rally ultimately descended into violence when the host venue, Serb Hall, attempted to shut down the event due to non-compliance with COVID-19 public health rules. Serb Hall's manager, Nicholas Alioto, was pushed to the ground and kicked by rally attendees after making the announcement. One person was arrested and Serb Hall was fined $1500.

Trump, who was defeated in the 2020 election by Joe Biden, continued his efforts to overturn the results of the election into January 2021. Following the Trump-inspired attack on the United States Capitol on January 6, 2021, Kapenga voted with other state Senate Republicans to block a resolution which would have affirmed Biden's victory and condemned the attack on the Capitol.

In 2025, Kapenga voted against the 2025-2027 state budget, which had been crafted on a bipartisan basis by Governor Evers, and state legislative leaders of both parties.

While running for re-election in 2026, Kapenga announced that he will run in the special election for county executive of Waukesha County, Wisconsin, in December 2026, and will resign his seat in the Senate if elected as county executive.

== Electoral history ==
=== Wisconsin Assembly, 33rd district (2010) ===
Year	Election	Date	Elected				Defeated				Total	Plurality
2010	Primary	Sep. 14	Chris Kapenga	Republican	5,253	39.87%	Brian Dorow	Rep.	4,541	34.47%	13,174	712
2010	Primary	Sep. 14	Chris Kapenga	Republican	5,253	39.87%	Joe Deklotz	Rep.	2,646	20.09%	13,174	712
2010	Primary	Sep. 14	Chris Kapenga	Republican	5,253	39.87%	Steve Ksobiech	Rep.	734	5.57%	13,174	712
2010	General	Nov. 2	Chris Kapenga	Republican	23,580	99.50%	--unopposed--				23,699	23,461

=== Wisconsin Assembly, 99th district (2012, 2014) ===
Year	Election	Date	Elected				Defeated				Total	Plurality
2012	General	Nov. 6	Chris Kapenga	Republican	26,314	76.28%	Thomas D. Hibbard	Dem.	8,166	23.67%	34,495	18,148
2014	General	Nov. 4	Chris Kapenga (inc)	Republican	23,232	77.82%	Alice Jensen	Dem.	6,593	22.08%	29,855	16,639

=== Wisconsin Senate (2012) ===
Year	Election	Date	Elected				Defeated				Total	Plurality
2012 (special)	Special; Primary	Nov. 6	Paul Farrow	Republican	31,927	52.32%	Chris Kapenga	Rep.	29,027	47.57%	61,023	2,900

=== Wisconsin Senate (2015–present) ===
Year	Election	Date	Elected				Defeated				Total	Plurality
2015 (special)	Special; Primary	Jun. 23	Chris Kapenga	Republican	5,559	52.15%	Brian Dorow	Rep.	4,929	46.24%	11,339	630
2015 (special)	Special; Primary	Jun. 23	Chris Kapenga	Republican	5,559	52.15%	M. D. Langner	Rep.	168	1.58%	11,339	630
2015 (special)	Special	Jul. 21	Chris Kapenga	Republican	7,191	71.86%	Sherryll Shaddock	Dem.	2,798	27.96%	10,007	4,393
2018	General	Nov. 6	Chris Kapenga (inc)	Republican	68,759	96.85%	--unopposed--				70,992	66,526
2022	General	Nov. 8	Chris Kapenga (inc)	Republican	67,323	96.40%	--unopposed--				69,838	64,808

Political offices
Preceded by Roger Roth	President of the Wisconsin Senate; 2021–2025	Succeeded by Mary Felzkowski
