= John Spiros =

American politician (born 1961)

Member of the Wisconsin State Assembly from the 86th district
- Incumbent
- Assumed office January 7, 2013
- Preceded by: Jerry Petrowski

Personal details
- Born: July 28, 1961 (age 65) Akron, Ohio, U.S.
- Party: Republican
- Spouse: Rebecca
- Children: 5
- Education: Metropolitan Community College (AAS)
- Profession: politician
- Website: Official website

Military service
- Allegiance: United States
- Branch/service: United States Air Force
- Years of service: 1979–1985
- Unit: 3906th Special Security Squadron

John Spiros (born July 28, 1961) is an American businessman and Republican politician from Marshfield, Wisconsin. He is a member of the Wisconsin State Assembly, representing Wisconsin's 86th Assembly district since 2013.

== Early life and career ==
Born in Akron, Ohio, he graduated from Marietta High School in 1979. After graduation, he enlisted in the United States Air Force and served six years in the Air Force Security Police. He served for a time with the 3906th Special Security Squadron, which provided protection for Air Force generals and Strategic Air Command. He received the U.S. Air Force Commendation Medal and was honorably discharged in 1985.

After leaving the Air Force, he earned his associate's degree in criminal justice from Metropolitan Community College in Omaha, Nebraska, and worked three years as a police officer in Dallas, Texas. In the 1990s, he went to work for Kaplan Trucking Company and, in 1997, was made director of safety and claims. Since 2002, he has been vice president of safety and claims management with Roehl Transport, a trucking business based in Marshfield, Wisconsin.

== Political career ==
In 2005, Spiros was elected to the Marshfield Common Council, defeating incumbent Ray Gougeon. He ultimately served on the common council until 2013, and was president of the council in 2009. While on the council he served on the Marshfield Industrial Park Commission for seven years.

In 2012, he entered the race for Wisconsin State Assembly in the open 86th Assembly district seat, vacated by Jerry Petrowski, who had been elected to the Wisconsin State Senate. In the Republican primary, he defeated Wayne Thorson of Marathon, and went on to defeat Democrat Dennis Halkoski in the November general election. He has subsequently been reelected four times.

In the Assembly, he is chairman of the Assembly Committee on Criminal Justice and Public Safety and co-chair of the Joint Review Committee on Criminal Penalties. He also serves on the Assembly committees for state affairs, and for transportation, and on the Joint Legislative Council and Joint Committee for Review of Administrative Rules.

In 2016 he received an American Heart Association "Legislator of the Year" award for his work passing a state law requiring CPR training for state middle school students (2015 Wisc. Act 390).

== Personal life and family ==
He and his wife Rebecca live in Marshfield, Wisconsin. They have five adult children and 5 grandchildren.

In 2009 he was awarded the American Trucking Associations "Safety Director of the Year" award. He also served on the board of directors for the Transportation Industry Defense Association, a trade association providing education and seminars for transportation companies and attorneys who work on transportation liability issues, and was president of that organization from 2015 to 2017. He received TIDA's John T Biezup Memorial Award in 2021, which was presented at the TIDA Seminar in Philadelphia, PA. He is a past member of the Central Wisconsin State Fair Board of Directors. He is a member of the Marshfield Elks Club, and a member of the Marathon County Farm Bureau.

== Electoral history ==
=== Wisconsin Assembly, 70th district (2010) ===
Year	Election	Date	Elected				Defeated				Total	Plurality
2010	Primary	Sep. 14	John Spiros	Republican	2,431	50.72%	Wayne C. Thorson	Rep.	2,361	49.26%	4,793	70
2010	General	Nov. 2	Amy Sue Vruwink (inc)	Democratic	12,178	53.75%	John Spiros	Rep.	10,461	46.17%	22,658	1,717

=== Wisconsin Assembly, 86th district (2012–present) ===
Year	Election	Date	Elected				Defeated				Total	Plurality
2012	Primary	Aug. 14	John Spiros	Republican	3,985	73.43%	Wayne C. Thorson	Rep.	1,430	26.35%	5,427	2,555
2012	General	Nov. 6	John Spiros	Republican	17,175	55.64%	Dennis Halkoski	Dem.	13,644	44.20%	30,867	3,531
2014	General	Nov. 4	John Spiros (inc)	Republican	15,875	62.49%	Nancy Stencil	Dem.	9,528	37.51%	25,403	6,347
2016	General	Nov. 8	John Spiros (inc)	Republican	18,246	58.01%	Nancy Stencil	Dem.	11,142	35.43%	31,451	7,104
2016	General	Nov. 8	John Spiros (inc)	Republican	18,246	58.01%	Michael A. Tauschek	Ind.	2,047	6.51%	31,451	7,104
2018	Primary	Aug. 14	John Spiros (inc)	Republican	3,855	64.67%	Brent Jacobson	Rep.	2,103	35.28%	5,961	1,752
2018	General	Nov. 6	John Spiros (inc)	Republican	17,174	59.80%	Nancy Stencil	Dem.	10,575	36.82%	28,717	6,599
2018	General	Nov. 6	John Spiros (inc)	Republican	17,174	59.80%	Michael A. Tauschek	Ind.	945	3.29%	28,717	6,599
2020	General	Nov. 3	John Spiros (inc)	Republican	28,267	97.97%	--Unopposed--				28,853	27,681
2022	General	Nov. 8	John Spiros (inc)	Republican	22,224	97.15%	--Unopposed--				22,876	21,572
2024	Primary	Aug. 13	John Spiros (inc)	Republican	3,709	43.23%	Donna M. Rozar	Rep.	2,721	31.71%	8,580	988
2024	Primary	Aug. 13	John Spiros (inc)	Republican	3,709	43.23%	Trine Spindler	Rep.	2,143	24.98%	8,580	988
2024	General	Nov. 5	John Spiros (inc)	Republican	23,331	66.90%	John H. Small	Dem.	11,513	33.01%	34,877	11,818

Wisconsin State Assembly
Preceded by Jerry Petrowski	Member of the Wisconsin State Assembly from the 86th district January 7, 2013 – present	Incumbent
