= Jesse James (Wisconsin politician) =

American politician

Member of the Wisconsin Senate from the 23rd district
- Incumbent
- Assumed office January 3, 2023
- Preceded by: Kathy Bernier

Member of the Wisconsin State Assembly from the 68th district
- In office January 7, 2019 – January 2, 2023
- Preceded by: Kathy Bernier
- Succeeded by: Karen Hurd

Personal details
- Born: April 16, 1972 (age 54) Eau Claire, Wisconsin, U.S.
- Party: Republican
- Spouse: Vicki
- Children: 4
- Education: Chippewa Valley Technical College (AS)
- Profession: Police officer
- Website: Official website

Military service
- Allegiance: United States
- Branch/service: United States Army Reserve
- Unit: 397th U.S. Engineer Btn.

Jesse L. James (born April 16, 1972) is an American law enforcement professional and Republican politician from Eau Claire County, Wisconsin. He is a member of the Wisconsin Senate, representing the 23rd Senate district since January 2023. He previously served two terms in the Wisconsin State Assembly, representing the 68th Assembly district. Before being elected to the assembly, James was the police and fire chief of Altoona, Wisconsin. While still completing his legislative duties, James was selected and sworn in as the Chief of Police for the Village of Lake Hallie, Wisconsin on May 18, 2026.

== Biography ==
Jesse James is a graduate of Chippewa Valley Technical College and served in the U.S. Army for six years. He lives in Thorp, Wisconsin, with his wife Vicki, with whom he has four children. He currently works as a police officer in the Village of Cadott, and is the only active-duty law enforcement officer serving in the Wisconsin Legislature. James and his wife own a small business.

During the 2021–2022 session, James was the Republican Caucus Secretary and chair of the Substance Abuse and Prevention Committee. He sat on the following Wisconsin Assembly committees: Children and Families, Corrections, Criminal Justice and Public Safety, Family Law (vice-chair), Mental Health, Small Business Development, and Veteran and Military Affairs.

He announced on January 21, 2022, that he was running for office for Wisconsin's 23rd Senate District. On August 9, 2022, James won the Republican primary with 50% of the vote and faced the general election unopposed.

During the 2023-2024 session, James was appointed as chair of the Senate Committee on Mental Health, Substance Abuse Prevention, and Children and Families. He also serves as vice-chair of the Senate Committee on Universities and Revenue, and as a member of the Joint Legislative Audit Committee and the Senate Committee on Judiciary and Public Safety.

James is a graduate of the Bowhay Institute for Legislative Leadership Development (BILLD) program. He is an appointee to the Wisconsin State Council on Alcohol and other Drug Abuse (SCAODA) and to the Wisconsin Council on Military and State Relations.

== Legislation ==
James has been the lead author on several bills that have been signed into Wisconsin law. Some of these include 2021 Assembly Bill 91 (relating to throwing or expelling a bodily substance at a public safety worker or prosecutor), Assembly Bill 92 (expanding psychiatric bed capacity in the Chippewa Valley), Assembly Bill 94 (allowing a pupil enrolled in a home-based private educational program to serve as an election inspector), Assembly Bill 155 (relating to inspections of recreational and educational camps), Assembly Bill 482 (grants to schools to provide critical incident mapping data to law enforcement agencies), and 2021 Wisconsin Act 197 (regarding the regulation of certain electric fences).

Rep. James was the lead author of a bipartisan bill legalizing fentanyl testing strips in Wisconsin, which was signed into law on March 16, 2022.

On March 17, 2022, Governor Evers signed 2021 Wisconsin Act 182 into law, a James-authored bill that allows a parent to change the last name of a child when the other parent has been convicted of certain heinous crimes such as homicide or certain sexual offenses. The bill, nicknamed "the 4 Bill" by James, was inspired by the wife and children of a school superintendent in James' district who was convicted of sexual crimes against a minor.

Rep. James also authored a bill making September 11, 2001, a formal observance day in Wisconsin schools (2021 Wisconsin Act 213).

== Electoral history ==
=== Wisconsin Assembly (2018–2022) ===
Year	Election	Date	Elected				Defeated				Total	Plurality
2018	General	Nov. 6	Jesse James	Republican	14,129	57.59%	Wendy Sue Johnson	Dem.	10,394	42.37%	24,533	3,735
2020	General	Nov. 3	Jesse James (inc)	Republican	18,993	60.95%	Emily Berge	Dem.	12,162	39.03%	31,162	6,831

=== Wisconsin Senate (2022) ===
Year	Election	Date	Elected				Defeated				Total	Plurality
2022	Primary	Aug. 9	Jesse James	Republican	10,411	49.99%	Brian Westrate	Rep.	7,809	37.50%	20,826	2,602
2022	Primary	Aug. 9	Jesse James	Republican	10,411	49.99%	Sandra Scholz	Rep.	2,588	12.43%	20,826	2,602
2022	General	Nov. 8	Jesse James	Republican	56,391	94.73%	--Unopposed--				59,527	53,255

Wisconsin State Assembly
Preceded by Kathy Bernier	Member of the Wisconsin State Assembly from the 68th district January 7, 2019 – January 2, 2023	Succeeded by Karen Hurd
Wisconsin Senate
Preceded by Kathy Bernier	Member of the Wisconsin Senate from the 23rd district January 3, 2023 – present	Incumbent
