= Kristin Dassler-Alfheim =

21st century American politician

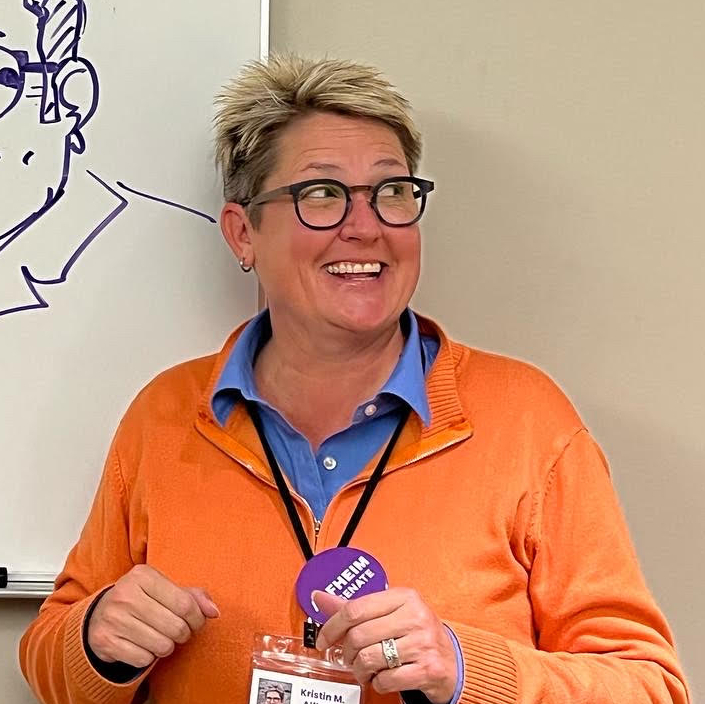

Member of the Wisconsin Senate from the 18th district
- Incumbent
- Assumed office January 6, 2025
- Preceded by: Dan Feyen

Member of the Appleton Common Council from the 11th district
- In office April 20, 2021 – April 15, 2025
- Preceded by: Patti Coenen
- Succeeded by: Adrian Stancil-Martin

Personal details
- Born: Kristin M. Dassler; August 26, 1971 (age 55) Wausau, Wisconsin, U.S.
- Party: Democratic
- Spouses: Jon A. Alfheim (m. 1992; div. 2017); Karianne Carr (m. 2022)
- Children: 1
- Education: Northland College
- Occupation: Businesswoman
- Website: Official website; Campaign website

Kristin M. Dassler-Alfheim (née Dassler; born August 1971) is an American businesswoman and politician from Appleton, Wisconsin. She is a member of the Wisconsin Senate, representing Wisconsin's 18th Senate district since 2025. She previously served four years as a member of the Appleton Common Council. A political independent for most of her life, she is now a member of the Democratic Party.

== Early life and career ==
Kristin Dassler-Alfheim was born Kristin Dassler in Wausau, Wisconsin, in 1971. She was raised and educated in Marathon County, Wisconsin, growing up on her family's beef farm in the town of Weston. She graduated from D.C. Everest Senior High School, in Schofield, Wisconsin, in 1989, then worked at McDonald's for several years, as her first job. Since 1999, she has worked in the realm of financial services, and has owned her own small business as a retirement planner. She worked in volunteer government advocacy for both the Alzheimer's Association and the National Association of Insurance and Financial Advisors.

== Political career ==
In the 2021 Appleton elections, Dassler-Alfheim ran for the Appleton Common Council for the 11th District without an incumbent and won the election with 70.5% of the vote. She won reelection without a challenger in 2023. During her tenure on the Common Council, Appleton Mayor Jake Woodford has called her "the moderator", due to her status as the swing vote. Dassler-Alfheim declined to seek re-election to the Common Council in 2025.

In 2022, Dassler-Alfheim ran for Wisconsin Senate in what was then the 19th Wisconsin Senate district, following incumbent Republican Roger Roth's decision to run for lieutenant governor. She was unopposed in the Democratic primary, and faced freshman state representative Rachael Cabral-Guevara in the general election. The district skewed very favorably for the Republicans, but Cabral-Guevara won by just over 8% of the vote.

Due to the 2024 redistricting, Appleton shifted from the 19th Senate district to the 18th Senate district. The new district comprised the major Fox Cities of Appleton, Oshkosh, Neenah, and Menasha. No incumbent lived within the boundaries of the new district, leaving an open seat. Dassler-Alfheim announced that she would run again, and this time faced no opposition in the Democratic primary. In the general election, she defeated Republican Anthony Phillips, receiving 53% of the vote.

== Personal life and family ==
Kristin Dassler took the last name Alfheim when she married Jon A. Alfheim in August 1992. They had one child together and were married for about 25 years. Approximately 20 years into her 25 year-long marriage, she began questioning her sexuality, likening her experience to discovering music for the first time. She came out as a lesbian and divorced her husband in 2017. She subsequently married her wife in 2022.

Dassler-Alfheim and her wife, Karianne Carr, reside in Appleton, Wisconsin.

== Electoral history ==
=== Wisconsin Senate, 19th district (2022) ===
Year	Election	Date	Elected				Defeated				Total	Plurality
2022	General	Nov. 8	Rachael Cabral-Guevara	Republican	42,858	54.02%	Kristin Alfheim	Dem.	36,447	45.94%	79,338	6,411

=== Wisconsin Senate, 18th district (2024) ===
Year	Election	Date	Elected				Defeated				Total	Plurality
2024	General	Nov. 5	Kristin Alfheim	Democratic	46,878	53.25%	Anthony Phillips	Rep.	41,079	46.66%	88,032	5,799

Wisconsin Senate
Preceded by Dan Feyen	Member of the Wisconsin Senate from the 18th district January 6, 2025 – present	Incumbent
