= Howard Marklein =

American politician (born 1954)

Senate Co-Chair of the Wisconsin Legislature's Joint Finance Committee
- Incumbent
- Assumed office January 4, 2021
- Preceded by: Alberta Darling

President pro tempore of the Wisconsin Senate
- In office January 3, 2017 – January 4, 2021
- Preceded by: Rick Gudex
- Succeeded by: Patrick Testin

Member of the Wisconsin Senate from the 17th district
- Incumbent
- Assumed office January 3, 2015
- Preceded by: Dale Schultz

Member of the Wisconsin State Assembly from the 51st district
- In office January 3, 2011 – January 3, 2015
- Preceded by: Steve Hilgenberg
- Succeeded by: Todd Novak

Personal details
- Born: October 3, 1954 (age 72) Madison, Wisconsin, U.S.
- Party: Republican
- Spouse: Peggy McNeil
- Children: 2
- Education: University of Wisconsin, Whitewater (BBA)
- Occupation: Certified Public Accountant
- Website: Official website

Howard L. Marklein (born October 3, 1954) is an American politician and retired accountant and fraud examiner from Iowa County, Wisconsin. A member of the Republican Party, he has represented Wisconsin's 17th Senate district in the Wisconsin Senate since 2015 and was Senate president pro tempore from 2017 to 2021. Marklein is a Senate co-chair of the Joint Finance Committee. From 2011 to 2015, he represented the 51st Assembly district in the Wisconsin State Assembly.

== Early life and education ==
Howard Marklein was born in Madison, Wisconsin, and raised on a dairy farm in rural Spring Green, where he still resides. He graduated from River Valley High School in 1972 and earned a Bachelor of Business Administration degree in accounting at the University of Wisconsin–Whitewater in 1976.

After college, Marklein worked for First Wisconsin National Bank of Milwaukee (now U.S. Bancorp). He was recruited by Virchow, Krause, & Company, LLP (now Baker Tilly US, LLP) to work in its Dodgeville office. In 1979, he obtained his Certified Public Accountant (CPA) certification. Shortly thereafter, Marklein was promoted and transferred to Virchow, Krause's Whitewater and Fort Atkinson offices. In 1984, he was promoted to partner. Later, his practice focused on forensic accounting and white collar crime investigations, for which he became a Certified Fraud Examiner (CFE). He is retired from that career.

== Political career ==
Marklein was elected to represent the 51st Assembly district in the Wisconsin State Assembly in 2010 and reelected in 2012.

On April 7, 2013, Marklein announced that he would launch a primary challenge to incumbent state senator Dale Schultz. A moderate Republican who sometimes crossed voted with Democrats, Schultz chose not to run for reelection after Marklein took an early lead in fundraising. With Schultz out of the race, Marklein won the nomination unopposed and defeated Democratic nominee Pat Bomhack in the general election.

The Republican Senate caucus elected Marklein president pro tempore for the 2017 and 2019 sessions. In 2021, he became the Senate co-chair of the Joint Finance Committee. He retained that chairmanship in the 2023–2024 session.

== Personal life and family ==
Marklein is married to Peggy McNeil, a registered nurse. They have two children, three stepchildren, and six grandchildren.

== Electoral history ==
=== Wisconsin Assembly (2010, 2012) ===
Year	Election	Date	Elected				Defeated				Total	Plurality
2010	General	Nov. 2	Howard Marklein	Republican	10,822	52.13%	John Simonson	Dem.	9,931	47.84%	20,759	891
2012	General	Nov. 2	Howard Marklein (inc)	Republican	14,279	51.85%	Maureen May-Grimm	Dem.	13,238	48.07%	27,539	1,041

=== Wisconsin Senate (2014–present) ===
Year	Election	Date	Elected				Defeated				Total	Plurality
2014	General	Nov. 4	Howard Marklein	Republican	34,601	55.07%	Pat Bomhack	Dem.	28,179	44.85%	62,836	6,422
2018	General	Nov. 6	Howard Marklein (inc)	Republican	37,465	54.10%	Kriss Marion	Dem.	31,757	45.86%	69,248	5,708
2022	General	Nov. 8	Howard Marklein (inc)	Republican	44,405	60.15%	Pat Skogen	Dem.	29,398	39.82%	73,825	15,007

Wisconsin State Assembly
Preceded by Steve Hilgenberg	Member of the Wisconsin State Assembly from the 51st district January 3, 2011 – January 3, 2015	Succeeded by Todd Novak
Wisconsin Senate
Preceded by Rick Gudex	President pro tempore of the Wisconsin Senate; 2017–2021	Succeeded by Patrick Testin
Preceded by Dale Schultz	Member of the Wisconsin Senate from the 17th district January 3, 2015 – present	Incumbent
