= Dan Feyen =

21st century American politician

Member of the Wisconsin Senate
- Incumbent
- Assumed office January 6, 2025
- Preceded by: Duey Stroebel
- Constituency: 20th district
- In office January 3, 2017 – January 6, 2025
- Preceded by: Rick Gudex
- Succeeded by: Kristin Dassler-Alfheim
- Constituency: 18th district

Personal details
- Born: Daniel Joseph Feyen; July 12, 1968 (age 58) New Holstein, Wisconsin, U.S.
- Party: Republican
- Spouse: Lori Barker
- Children: 2
- Education: Fox Valley Technical College (Dip.)
- Occupation: Print and bindery coordinator
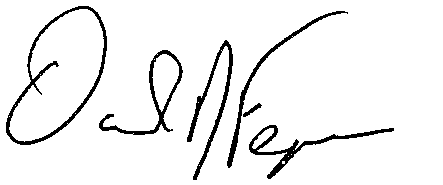
- Signature
- Website: Campaign website

Daniel Joseph Feyen (born July 12, 1968) is an American Republican politician and retired printer from Fond du Lac, Wisconsin. He is a member of the Wisconsin Senate, representing Wisconsin's 20th Senate district since 2025; he previously represented the 18th Senate district from 2017 to 2025. He has been assistant majority leader of the Senate since 2019. He is also a former chairman of the Fond du Lac County Republican Party.

== Early life and career ==
Dan Feyen was born in New Holstein, Wisconsin, in Calumet County. He graduated from New Holstein High School in 1986 and went on to receive a diploma in printing from Fox Valley Technical College, in Grand Chute, Wisconsin. He then went to work in the printing and bindery business in Fond du Lac, Wisconsin, for much of the next 30 years.

In Fond du Lac, he became involved with the United States Junior Chamber, and was president of the Fond du Lac chapter in the 1990s. He also became active in the Republican Party of Wisconsin and was elected chairman of the Fond du Lac County Republican Party. He served nearly a decade as chairman of the county party.

== Political career ==
On November 30, 2015, state senator Rick Gudex announced he would not run for re-election in 2016. Within 15 minutes, Feyen declared his candidacy to succeed Gudex in the Wisconsin Senate. Oshkosh businessman and pastor Mark Elliott also sought the Republican nomination. Feyen prevailed in the primary and went on to win the general election, defeating Winnebago County executive Mark Harris.

He won re-election in 2020 with 59% of the vote. In the 2016 and 2020 elections, Feyen was elected to represent the 18th Senate district, which then comprised central Fond du Lac County and the southern half of Winnebago County, including the cities of Oshkosh and Fond du Lac.

Feyen was elected by the Senate Republican caucus as Assistant Majority Leader for the 2019–2020 term, and has continued to hold that office. He was formerly chairman of the Committee on Commerce and Trade and is now chairman of the Committee on Economic Development and Technical Colleges.

After the 2024 redistricting, Feyen no longer resided in the 18th Senate district. He announced that he would instead run for election in 20th Senate district, comprising parts of central and southeastern Fond du Lac County, northern Washington County, southern Sheboygan County, northern Ozaukee County, and part of northeast Dodge County.

== Personal life and family ==
Dan Feyen married Lori Barker, who was also a member of the Fond du Lac Junior Chamber during his presidency of that organization in the 1990s. They have two adult children and reside in Fond du Lac.

Feyen is a member of the Knights of Columbus and the Elks Club.

== Electoral history ==
=== Wisconsin Senate, 18th district (2016, 2020) ===
Year	Election	Date	Elected				Defeated				Total	Plurality
2016	Primary	Aug. 9	Dan Feyen	Republican	5,225	55.97%	Mark Elliott	Rep.	4,108	44.00%	9,336	1,117
2016	General	Nov. 8	Dan Feyen	Republican	46,076	55.83%	Mark L. Harris	Dem.	36,366	44.06%	82,529	9,710
2020	General	Nov. 3	Dan Feyen (inc)	Republican	52,490	59.09%	Aaron M. Wojciechowski	Dem.	36,274	40.84%	88,826	16,216

=== Wisconsin Senate, 20th district (2024) ===
Year	Election	Date	Elected				Defeated				Total	Plurality
2024	Primary	Aug. 13	Dan Feyen	Republican	17,243	64.29%	Timothy Ramthun	Rep.	9,543	35.59%	26,817	7,700
2024	General	Nov. 5	Dan Feyen	Republican	73,552	69.99%	Michael Rapp	Dem.	31,434	29.91%	105,092	42,118

Wisconsin Senate
Preceded by Rick Gudex	Member of the Wisconsin Senate from the 18th district January 3, 2017 – January 6, 2025	Succeeded by Kristin Alfheim
Preceded by Duey Stroebel	Member of the Wisconsin Senate from the 20th district January 6, 2025 – present	Incumbent
