= Dianne Hesselbein =

21st century American politician

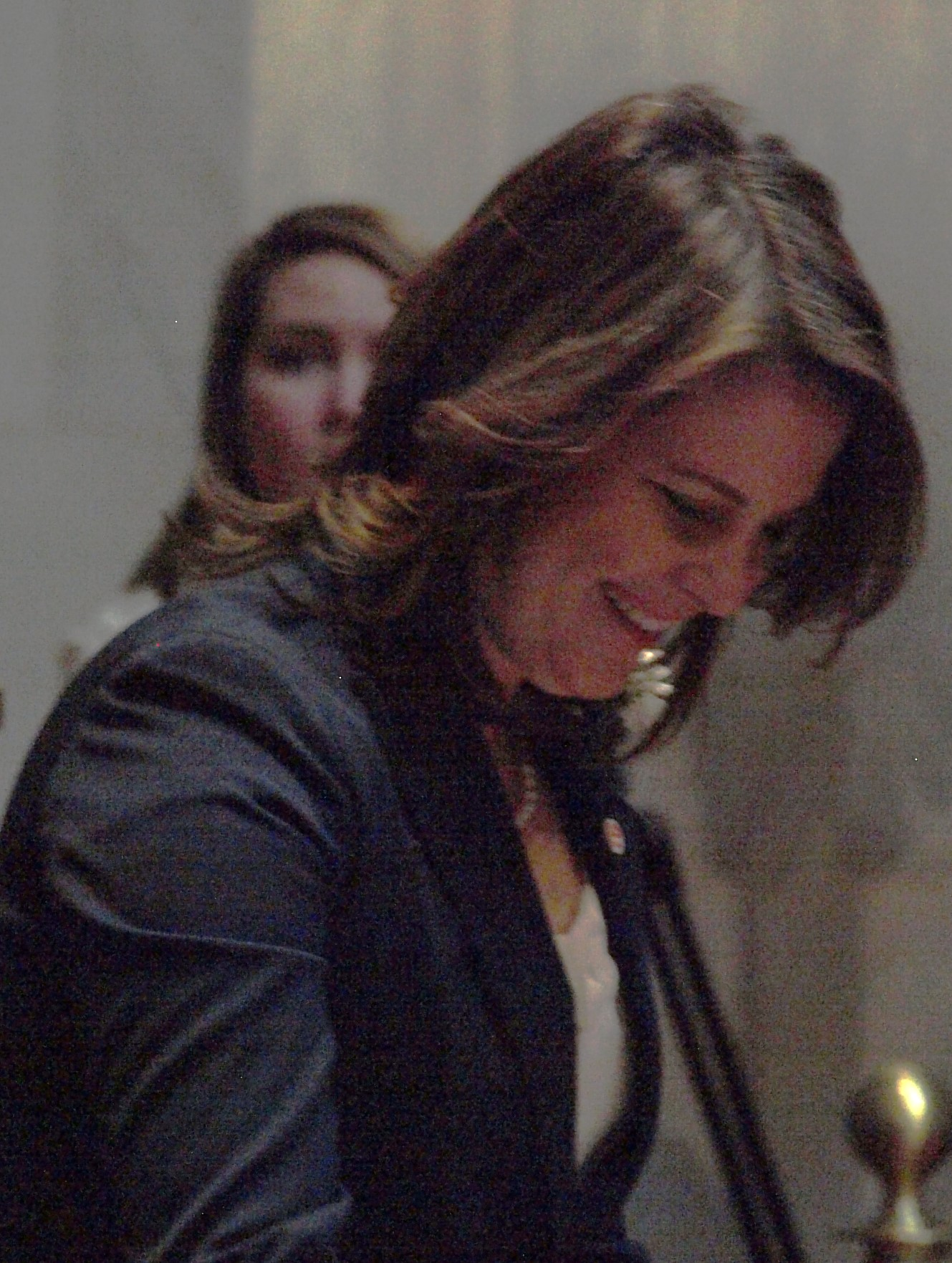
- Hesselbein in 2013

Minority Leader of the Wisconsin Senate
- Incumbent
- Assumed office December 1, 2023
- Preceded by: Melissa Agard

Member of the Wisconsin Senate from the 27th district
- Incumbent
- Assumed office January 3, 2023
- Preceded by: Jon Erpenbach

Member of the Wisconsin State Assembly from the 79th district
- In office January 7, 2013 – January 2, 2023
- Preceded by: Sondy Pope-Roberts
- Succeeded by: Alex Joers

Personal details
- Born: Dianne Conway; March 10, 1971 (age 55) Madison, Wisconsin, U.S.
- Party: Democratic
- Spouse(s): Scott Edmundson (m. 1995; div. 2000) Robert Hesselbein
- Children: 3
- Education: University of Wisconsin, Oshkosh (BS); Edgewood College (MA)
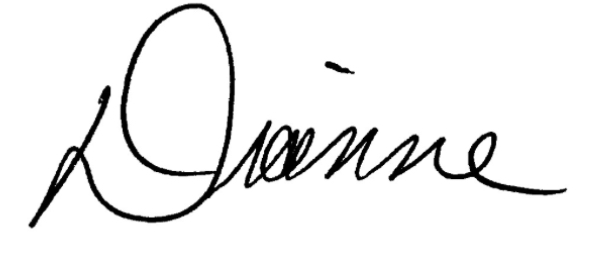
- Signature
- Website: State Senate website Campaign website

Dianne H. Hesselbein (née Conway; born March 10, 1971) is an American Democratic politician from Middleton, Wisconsin. She is the minority leader of the Wisconsin Senate since December 2023; she has been a member of the Senate since January 2023, representing Wisconsin's 27th Senate district. She previously served ten years in the Wisconsin State Assembly, representing the 79th Assembly district from 2013 through 2023.

== Biography ==
Dianne Hesselbein was born Dianne Conway in Madison, Wisconsin, in March 1971. She graduated from La Follette High School in 1989 then attended University of Wisconsin–Oshkosh, where she earned her bachelor's degree in 1993. She obtained her master's in religious studies from Edgewood College in 1996.

She subsequently moved to Middleton, Wisconsin, just west of Madison, where she was elected to the Dane County board of supervisors. In November 2012, she was elected to the Wisconsin State Assembly without opposition, running on the Democratic Party ticket. She was subsequently re-elected in 2014, 2016, 2018, and 2020, and rose within the caucus to become assistant minority leader from 2017 through 2022.

In December 2021, long-time incumbent state senator Jon Erpenbach announced he would not run for a seventh term in 2022. A week later, Hesselbein announced she would run for the open Senate seat. She faced no opposition in the Democratic primary and went on to defeat Republican candidate Robert Relph with 68% of the vote in the November general election.

Hesselbein was sworn in as state senator in January 2023. In December 2023, she was elected minority leader of the Wisconsin Senate after the resignation of Melissa Agard.

== Personal life and family ==
Dianne Hesselbein's first husband was Scott Edmundson; during that marriage she was known as Dianne Edmundson. They were married in 1995 and had two children together before divorcing in 2000.

She took the name Dianne Hesselbein when she married airline pilot Robert Hesselbein, with whom she had one more child. She resides in Middleton with her husband, who is retired.

== Electoral history ==
=== Wisconsin Assembly, 77th district (2010) ===
Year	Election	Date	Elected				Defeated				Total	Plurality
2010	Primary	Sep. 14	Brett Hulsey	Democratic	2,904	44.17%	Dianne H. Hesselbein	Dem.	1,992	30.30%	6,575	912
2010	Primary	Sep. 14	Brett Hulsey	Democratic	2,904	44.17%	Fred Wade	Dem.	1,125	17.11%	6,575	912
2010	Primary	Sep. 14	Brett Hulsey	Democratic	2,904	44.17%	John Imes	Dem.	347	5.28%	6,575	912
2010	Primary	Sep. 14	Brett Hulsey	Democratic	2,904	44.17%	Douglas C. Zwank	Dem.	205	3.12%	6,575	912

=== Wisconsin Assembly, 79th district (2012–2020) ===
Year	Election	Date	Elected				Defeated				Total	Plurality
2012	Primary	Aug. 14	Dianne Hesselbein	Democratic	3,590	65.52%	Ellen Lindgren	Dem.	1,885	34.40%	5,479	1,705
2012	General	Nov. 6	Dianne Hesselbein	Democratic	24,683	98.75%	--Unopposed--				24,995	24,371
2014	General	Nov. 4	Dianne Hesselbein (inc)	Democratic	18,843	62.24%	Brent Renteria	Rep.	11,406	37.67%	30,275	7,437
2016	General	Nov. 8	Dianne Hesselbein (inc)	Democratic	23,211	63.84%	Jordan Zadra	Rep.	13,105	36.04%	36,360	10,106
2018	General	Nov. 6	Dianne Hesselbein (inc)	Democratic	28,079	97.58%	--Unopposed--				28,776	27,382
2020	General	Nov. 3	Dianne Hesselbein (inc)	Democratic	29,719	67.14%	Victoria Fueger	Rep.	14,507	32.77%	44,267	15,212

=== Wisconsin Senate (2022) ===
Wisconsin Senate, 27th District Election, 2022
Party	Candidate	Votes	%	±%
General Election, November 8, 2022
Democratic	Dianne Hesselbein	65,618	67.97%	+1.81%
Republican	Robert Relph	30,863	31.97%	
	Scattering	53	0.05%	
Plurality		34,755	36.00%	+3.63%
Total votes		96,534	100.0%	-1.14%
Democratic hold				

Wisconsin Senate
Preceded by Melissa Agard	Minority Leader of the Wisconsin Senate; 2023–present	Incumbent
