= Jon Erpenbach =

American politician

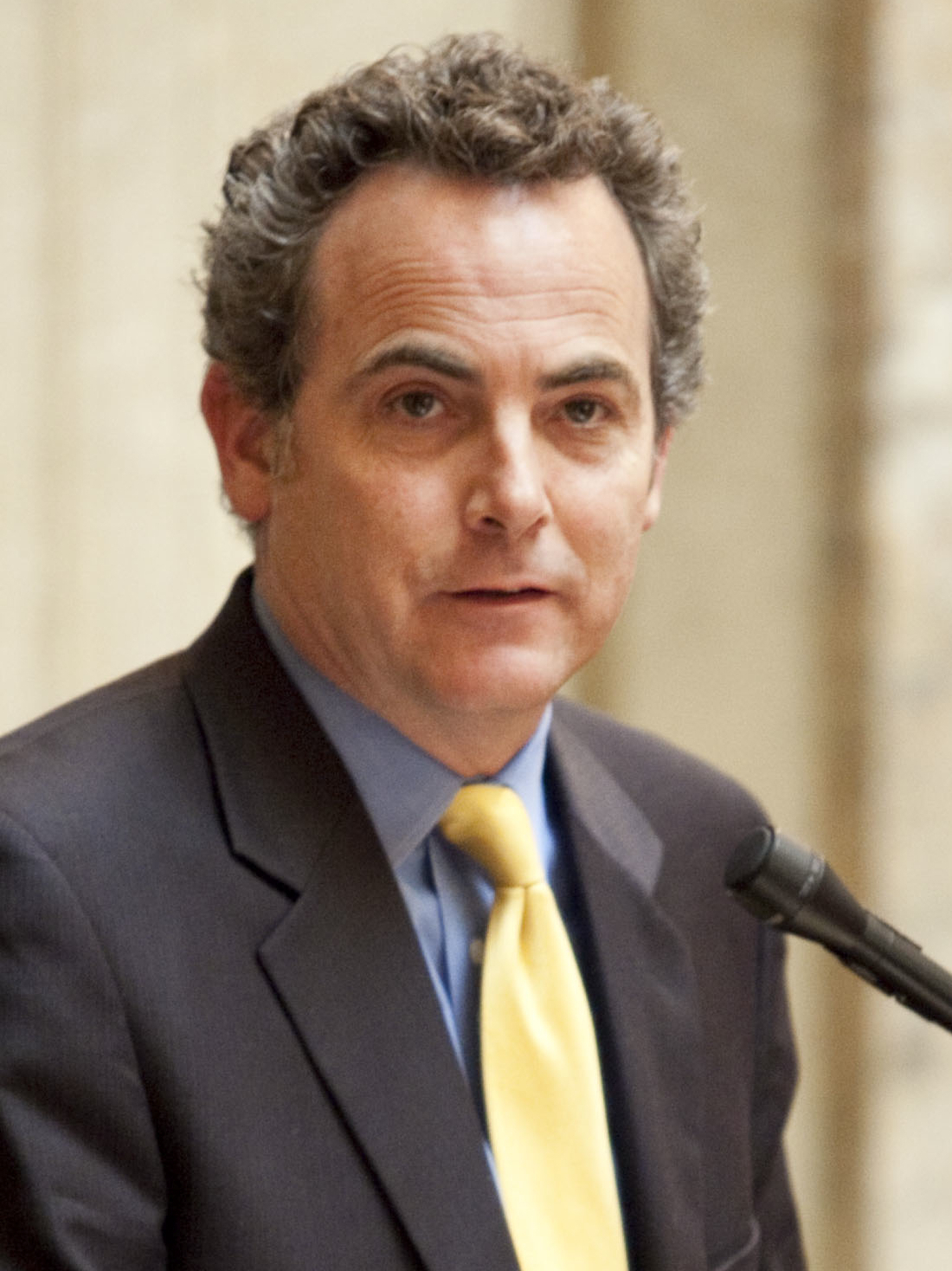
- Erpenbach in 2009

Chairman of the Wisconsin Parole Commission
- Incumbent
- Assumed office January 13, 2023
- Governor: Tony Evers
- Preceded by: Christopher Blythe

Minority Leader of the Wisconsin Senate
- In office January 6, 2003 – January 3, 2005
- Preceded by: Mary Panzer
- Succeeded by: Judy Robson

Member of the Wisconsin Senate from the 27th district
- In office January 4, 1999 – January 3, 2023
- Preceded by: Joe Wineke
- Succeeded by: Dianne Hesselbein

Personal details
- Born: January 28, 1961 (age 65) Middleton, Wisconsin, U.S.
- Party: Democratic
- Education: University of Wisconsin–Oshkosh

Jon B. Erpenbach (born January 28, 1961) is an American politician currently serving as chairman of the Wisconsin Parole Commission in the administration of Governor Tony Evers. He previously served as a Democratic member of the Wisconsin Senate, representing the 27th District from 1999 to 2023.

== Early life, education and career ==
Erpenbach was born in Middleton, Wisconsin and graduated from Middleton High School. He attended the University of Wisconsin–Oshkosh from 1979 to 1981. He worked as a radio personality on two Madison area radio stations and also worked for a Milwaukee station. He subsequently worked in both the State Assembly and Senate in media relations and as communications director.

== Wisconsin Senate ==
Erpenbach was elected to represent the 27th Senate District in November 1998 and was re-elected in 2002, 2006, 2010, 2014, and 2018. He retired from the Senate in 2023. He served as the Democratic Minority Leader from 2003 to 2005. He authored Wisconsin's No Call List legislation that was passed and signed into law in 2001. The legislation was a forerunner of the federal government's Do-Not-Call Implementation Act of 2003.

=== Bills and policy positions ===
The achievement that Senator Erpenbach is most well known for is his extremely successful and popular Do Not Call legislation, passed and signed into law in 2001. The bill had bipartisan support in both the Senate and Assembly. The consumer protections in the bill include: allowing consumers to add their land or cellular telephones to the Do Not Call list, creating a prohibition for unsolicited faxes, and Increasing the penalties for violations from the current maximum of $100 to amounts between $1,000 and $10,000. The bill was a forerunner of the federal government's Do-Not-Call Implementation Act of 2003.

Erpenbach is well known for his Healthy Wisconsin bill.

Erpenbach authored the Traveling Sales Crew Regulation bill, also known as Malinda's Law, which would give traveling sales crew members similar employment rights that part-time workers in Wisconsin are currently guaranteed by state law. The bill would also require all crews to register with the Department of Agriculture, Trade, and Consumer Protection before going door to door in state communities. By registering members of the crew, alerts for members with outstanding warrants in other states can be identified and criminals detained. The bill passed last session in the State Senate but was stopped in the Assembly. It is expected that the bill will become law this legislative session.

=== 2011 Wisconsin protests ===
During the protests in Wisconsin, Erpenbach fled to Illinois along with the 13 other Democratic State Senators to attempt to deny the State Senate a quorum on Governor Scott Walker's Budget Repair legislation, ultimately unsuccessfully.

== Wisconsin Parole Commission ==
Erpenbach did not seek reelection to the Senate in 2022 and on January 13, 2023 was appointed chairman of the Wisconsin Parole Commission by Governor Tony Evers, a fellow Democrat.
