= Jerry Petrowski =

American politician (born 1950)

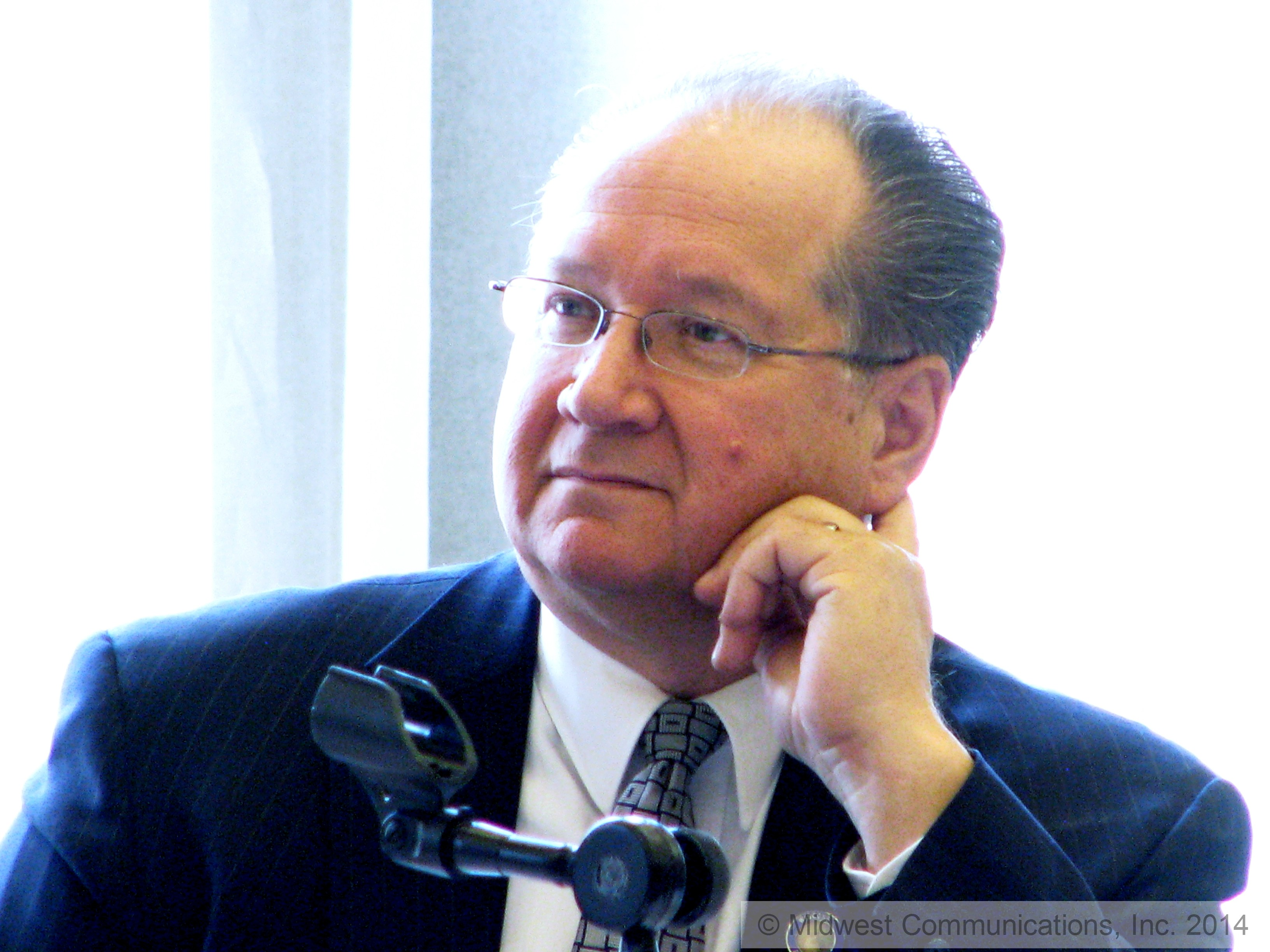

Member of the Wisconsin Senate from the 29th district
- In office July 17, 2012 – January 3, 2023
- Preceded by: Pam Galloway
- Succeeded by: Cory Tomczyk

Member of the Wisconsin State Assembly from the 86th district
- In office January 3, 1999 – July 17, 2012
- Preceded by: Thomas J. Springer
- Succeeded by: John Spiros

Personal details
- Born: June 16, 1950 (age 76) Wausau, Wisconsin, U.S.
- Party: Republican
- Spouse: Ellen M. Jensen (m. 1973)
- Children: 4
- Education: University of Wisconsin-Marathon County; Northcentral Technical College
- Profession: Politician, farmer

Military service
- Allegiance: United States
- Branch/service: United States Army Reserve
- Years of service: 1968–1974

Jerry James Petrowski (born June 16, 1950) is a retired American Republican politician and a former ginseng, dairy, and beef farmer from Marathon County, Wisconsin. He represented Marathon County for 24 years in the Wisconsin Legislature, serving 11 years in the Wisconsin Senate (2012–2023) and 13 years in the state Assembly (1999–2012).

== Early life and career ==
Petrowski was born on June 16, 1950, in Wausau, Wisconsin, and has lived most of his life in the Wausau area. He graduated from Wausau's Newman High School in 1968 and immediately enlisted in the United States Army Reserve. He served six years in the Army Reserve, and attended the University of Wisconsin–Marathon County and Northcentral Technical College.

He worked as a machinist at Marathon Electric Manufacturing Company for nine years, and during that time was a member of the International Brotherhood of Electrical Workers labor union. He subsequently became a small business owner and farmer and rancher, growing ginseng and raising dairy and beef cows.

== Political career ==
Petrowski represented the 86th Assembly District in the Wisconsin State Assembly from 1999 to 2012. From 2003 to 2007 he served as the Majority Caucus Sergeant at Arms in the State Assembly.

Petrowski was a candidate in the recall election to replace fellow Republican State Senator Pam Galloway of the 29th Senate District, who had resigned after being targeted for recall. On June 5, 2012, Petrowski was elected to the Wisconsin State Senate, defeating Representative Donna Seidel with 61.34% of the vote.

Petrowski was the Chair of the Senate Transportation, Public Safety and Veterans and Military Affairs Committee, Vice Chair of the Senate Economic Development and Local Government Committee, and is a voting member of the Senate Agriculture, Small Business, and Tourism Committee, the Senate Financial Institutions and Rural Issues Committee, and the Joint Legislative Council. Petrowski also serves on the Governor’s Council on Highway Safety, Transportation Projects Commission, Rustic Roads Board, Scenic Byway Advisory Committee, Council on Military and State Relations, the State Council on Interstate Compact on Educational Opportunity for Military Children and the University of Wisconsin–Stevens Point College of Natural Resources Advisory Board.

== Personal life ==
Jerry Petrowski is one of two children born to Leo Petrowski and his wife Marcella (née Nowak). Leo Petrowski was also a lifelong resident of Marathon County, and worked as a millwright at Marathon Electric Manufacturing Company.

On December 1, 1973, Jerry Petrowski married Ellen Marie Jensen at Holy Name Catholic Church in Wausau. They have four adult children and three grandchildren.

Wisconsin State Assembly
Preceded by Thomas J. Springer	Member of the Wisconsin State Assembly from the 86th district January 3, 1999 – July 17, 2012	Succeeded by John Spiros
Wisconsin Senate
Preceded by Pam Galloway	Member of the Wisconsin Senate from the 29th district July 17, 2012 – January 3, 2023	Succeeded by Cory Tomczyk
