= Wisconsin State Senate =

Upper house of the Wisconsin Legislature

Coordinates: 43°04′27.5″N 89°23′03.0″W

Wisconsin Senate
- Wisconsin State Legislature

Type
- Type: Upper house
- Term limits: None

History
- New session started: January 6, 2025

Leadership
- President: Mary Felzkowski (R) since January 6, 2025
- President pro tempore: Patrick Testin (R) since January 4, 2021
- Majority Leader: Devin LeMahieu (R) since January 4, 2021
- Minority Leader: Dianne Hesselbein (D) since December 1, 2023

Structure
- Seats: 33
- Political groups: Majority: Republican (18); Minority: Democratic (15)
- Length of term: 4 years
- Authority: Article IV, Wisconsin Constitution
- Salary: $57,408/year + $115 per diem

Elections
- Last election: November 5, 2024 (16 seats)
- Next election: November 3, 2026 (17 seats)

Meeting place
- State Senate Chamber; Wisconsin State Capitol; Madison, Wisconsin

Website
- Wisconsin State Senate

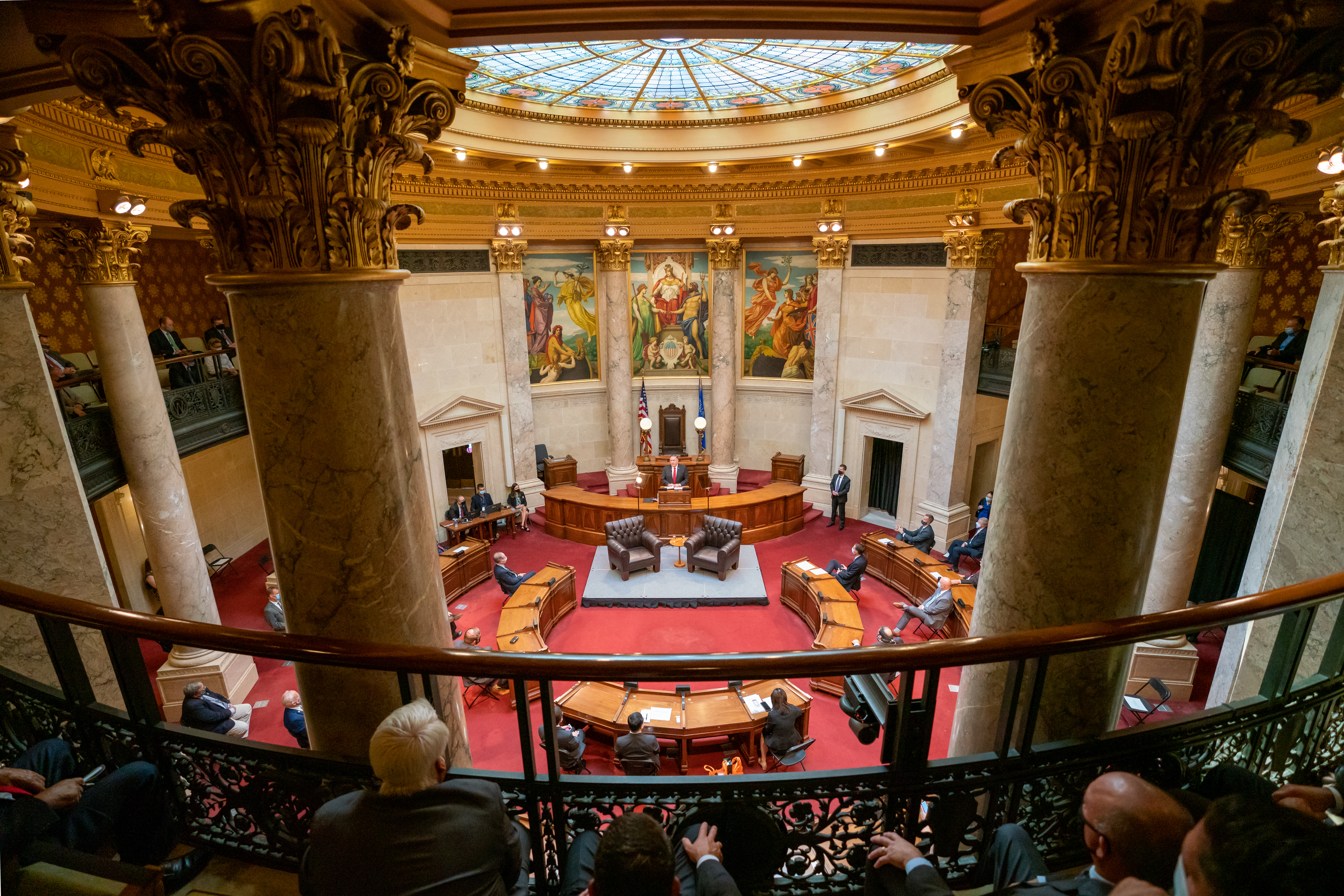
The Senate chamber seen from the gallery

The Wisconsin State Senate is the upper house of the Wisconsin State Legislature. Together with the Wisconsin State Assembly, they constitute the legislative branch of the state of Wisconsin. The powers of the Wisconsin Senate are modeled after those of the U.S. Senate. The Wisconsin State Senate is controlled by the Republican Party, as it has been for 20 of the past 22 years (with only the biennium of 2009-2010 as the exception).

The Wisconsin Constitution ties the size of the State Senate to that of the Assembly, by limiting its size to no less than 1/4, nor more than 1/3, of the size of the Assembly. Currently, Wisconsin is divided into 33 Senate Districts (1/3 of the current Assembly membership of 99) apportioned throughout the state based on population as determined by the decennial census, for a total of 33 senators. A Senate district is formed by combining three Assembly districts. Similar to the U.S. Senate, in addition to its duty of reviewing and voting on all legislation passed through the legislature, the State Senate has the exclusive responsibility of confirming certain gubernatorial appointments, particularly cabinet secretaries and members of boards and commissions. Senators are elected for four-year terms, staggered so that approximately half of the Senate is up for election every two years. If a vacancy occurs in a Senate seat between elections, it may be filled only by a special election. The Senate chamber is in the south wing of the Wisconsin State Capitol, in Madison. In February 2024, the legislative maps of the Senate, along with the State Assembly, were redrawn following a court decision that found them to be unconstitutionally gerrymandered in favor of Republicans.

== Salary and benefits ==
The salary of all legislators serving in the 2025 Wisconsin Legislature is $60,924, which is an increase of 6.12% from the previous biennium. The speaker of the assembly also receives an additional $25 monthly stipend. In addition to salaries, senators outside Madison, Wisconsin may receive a per diem up to $115 to cover living expenses while they are in Madison on state business. Members of the Dane County delegation may receive a per diem of half the amount to cover expenses.

== Current session ==
=== Composition ===
↓
15	18
Democratic	Republican

Affiliation	Party (Shading indicates majority caucus)		Total	Vacant
Affiliation	Democratic	Republican	Total	Vacant
Begin 100th Legislature (2011)	14	19	33	0
End 100th (2012)	17	16	33	0
Begin 101st (2013)	15	18	33	0
End 101st (2014)	15	17	32	1
Begin 102nd (2015)	14	18	32	1
End 102nd (2016)	14	18	32	1
Begin 103rd (2017)	13	20	33	0
End 103rd (2018)	15	18	33	0
Begin 104th (2019)	14	19	33	0
End 104th (2020)	13	18	31	2
Begin 105th (2021)	12	20	32	1
End 105th (2022)	12	21	33	0
Begin 106th (2023)	11	21	32	1
End 106th (2024)	10	22	32	1
Begin 107th (2025)	15	18	33	0
Latest voting share	45%	55%		

=== Senate officers ===
Position	Name
President of the Senate	Mary Felzkowski
President Pro Tempore of the Senate	Patrick Testin
Majority leader	Devin LeMahieu
Assistant Majority Leader	Dan Feyen
Majority Caucus Chair	Van Wanggaard
Majority Caucus Vice Chair	Joan Ballweg
Minority Leader	Dianne Hesselbein
Assistant Minority Leader	Jeff Smith
Minority Caucus Chair	Chris Larson
Minority Caucus Vice Chair	Mark Spreitzer
Chief Clerk	Cyrus Anderson
Sergeant-at-Arms	Tom Engels

=== Members ===
District	Name	Party	Residence	Start	Next Election
1	André Jacque	Rep	New Franken	2018	2026
2	Eric Wimberger	Rep	Oconto	2020	2028
3	Tim Carpenter	Dem	Milwaukee	2002	2026
4	Dora Drake	Dem	Milwaukee	2024 (special)	2028
5	Rob Hutton	Rep	Brookfield	2022	2026
6	LaTonya Johnson	Dem	Milwaukee	2016	2028
7	Chris Larson	Dem	Milwaukee	2010	2026
8	Jodi Habush Sinykin	Dem	Whitefish Bay	2024	2028
9	Devin LeMahieu	Rep	Oostburg	2014	2026
10	Rob Stafsholt	Rep	New Richmond	2020	2028
11	Stephen Nass	Rep	Whitewater	2014	2026
12	Mary Felzkowski	Rep	Tomahawk	2020	2028
13	John Jagler	Rep	Watertown	2021 (special)	2026
14	Sarah Keyeski	Dem	Lodi	2024	2028
15	Mark Spreitzer	Dem	Beloit	2022	2026
16	Melissa Ratcliff	Dem	Cottage Grove	2024	2028
17	Howard Marklein	Rep	Spring Green	2014	2026
18	Kristin Dassler-Alfheim	Dem	Appleton	2024	2028
19	Rachael Cabral-Guevara	Rep	Appleton	2022	2026
20	Dan Feyen	Rep	Fond du Lac	2016	2028
21	Van H. Wanggaard	Rep	Racine	2014	2026
22	Robert Wirch	Dem	Pleasant Prairie	1996	2028
23	Jesse James	Rep	Thorp	2022	2026
24	Patrick Testin	Rep	Stevens Point	2016	2028
25	Romaine Quinn	Rep	Birchwood	2022	2026
26	Kelda Roys	Dem	Madison	2020	2028
27	Dianne Hesselbein	Dem	Middleton	2022	2026
28	Julian Bradley	Rep	New Berlin	2020	2028
29	Cory Tomczyk	Rep	Mosinee	2022	2026
30	Jamie Wall	Dem	Green Bay	2024	2028
31	Jeff Smith	Dem	Brunswick	2018	2026
32	Brad Pfaff	Dem	Onalaska	2020	2028
33	Chris Kapenga	Rep	Delafield	2015 (special)	2026

== Notable past members ==
- C. Latham Sholes (1848–1850; 1856–1858), invented the QWERTY keyboard
- Angus Cameron (1863–1864; 1871–1872), former U.S. Senator from Wisconsin (1875–1885)
- Gaylord Nelson (1949–1958), former Governor of Wisconsin (1959–1963) and U.S. Senator from Wisconsin (1963–1981)
- Henry Maier (1951–1960), former Mayor of Milwaukee (1960–1988)
- James B. Brennan (1959–1962), former U.S. Attorney for the Eastern District of Wisconsin (1962–1969) and Milwaukee City Attorney (1972–1984)
- William Bablitch (1972–1983), former Justice of the Wisconsin Supreme Court (1983–2003)
- Tom Petri (1973–1979), former U.S. House Representative (1979–2015)
- Jim Sensenbrenner (1975–1979), former U.S. House Representative (1979–2021)
- Russ Feingold (1983–1993), former U.S. Senator from Wisconsin (1993–2011)
- John Norquist (1983–1988), former Mayor of Milwaukee (1988–2004)
- Tom Barrett (1989–1993), former U.S. House Representative (1993–2003) and former Mayor of Milwaukee (2004–2021)
- Gwen Moore (1993–2005), current U.S. House Representative (2005–present)
- Glenn Grothman (2005–2015), current U.S. House Representative (2015–present)
- Tom Tiffany (2012–2020), current U.S. House Representative (2020–present)
- Fred Risser (1962-2021), longest-serving state legislator in American history
- Scott Fitzgerald (1995–2021), current U.S. House Representative (2021–present)

== List of senate presidents (since 1979) ==
#	President	Party	Start of service	End of service
1	Fred Risser	Democratic	May 1, 1979	April 20, 1993
2	Brian Rude	Republican	April 20, 1993	July 9, 1996
-	Fred Risser	Democratic	July 9, 1996	April 21, 1998
-	Brian Rude	Republican	April 21, 1998	January 4, 1999
-	Fred Risser	Democratic	January 4, 1999	January 6, 2003
3	Alan Lasee	Republican	January 6, 2003	January 8, 2007
-	Fred Risser	Democratic	January 8, 2007	January 3, 2011
4	Mike Ellis	Republican	January 3, 2011	July 17, 2012
-	Fred Risser	Democratic	July 17, 2012	January 7, 2013
-	Mike Ellis	Republican	January 7, 2013	January 5, 2015
5	Mary Lazich	Republican	January 5, 2015	January 3, 2017
6	Roger Roth	Republican	January 3, 2017	January 4, 2021
7	Chris Kapenga	Republican	January 4, 2021	January 6, 2025
8	Mary Felzkowski	Republican	January 6, 2025	present

== See also ==
- Wisconsin Legislature
- Wisconsin State Assembly
- Impeachment in Wisconsin
