= 2025 Democratic Party of Wisconsin chairmanship election =

- June 15, 2025
| Candidate | Devin Remiker | Joe Zepecki | William Garcia |
| First round | 437; 48.23% | 330; 36.42% | 139; 15.34% |
| Second round | 485; 53.89% | 415; 46.11% | Eliminated |
Chair before election
Ben Wikler
Elected Chair
Devin Remiker

The 2025 Democratic Party of Wisconsin chairmanship election was held on June 15, 2025, to elect the chairperson of the Democratic Party of Wisconsin (DPW) for a two-year term. The incumbent chair, Ben Wikler, declined to run for a fourth term. The election took place at the party's annual convention in Wisconsin Dells, Wisconsin. Only registered delegates to the convention were eligible to vote; the election was conducted with ranked-choice voting. Former Democratic Party of Wisconsin executive director Devin Remiker was elected chair, receiving 48.2% of the first round vote and 53.9% of the second round vote.

== Candidates ==
=== Declared ===
- William Garcia, chair of Wisconsin's 3rd congressional district Democrats
- Devin Remiker, former executive director of the Democratic Party of Wisconsin
- Joe Zepecki, political operative

=== Withdrew ===
- Bryan Kennedy, mayor of Glendale, Wisconsin

=== Declined ===
- Ben Wikler, incumbent party chair (endorsed Remiker)

== Endorsements ==
Devin Remiker

Party chairs

- Martha Laning, former Chair of the Democratic Party of Wisconsin (2015–2019)
- Martha Love, former Chair of the Democratic Party of Wisconsin (1993)
- Jeffrey A. Neubauer, former Chair of the Democratic Party of Wisconsin (1989–1993)
- Ben Wikler, outgoing Chair of the Democratic Party of Wisconsin (2019–present)

Legislative leadership

- Kalan Haywood, assistant minority leader of the Wisconsin State Assembly (2022–present)
- Dianne Hesselbein, minority leader of the Wisconsin Senate (2023–present)
- Greta Neubauer, minority leader of the Wisconsin State Assembly (2022–present)

State legislators

- Brienne Brown, state representative from the 43rd district (2025–present)
- Kristin Dassler-Alfheim, state senator for the 18th district (2025–present)
- Ben DeSmidt, state representative from the 65th district (2025–present)
- Steve Doyle, state representative from the 94th district (2011–present)
- Gary Goyke, former state senator for the 19t district (1975–1983)
- Andrew Hysell, state representative from the 48th district (2025–present)
- Alex Joers, state representative from the 81st district (2025–present); 79th district (2023–2025)
- Tip McGuire, state representative from the 64th district (2019–present)
- Tod Ohnstad, former state representative from the 65th district (2013–2025)
- Brad Pfaff, state senator for the 32nd district (2021–present)
- Angela Stroud, state representative from the 73rd district (2025–present)
- Robert Wirch, state senator for the 22nd district (1997–present)

County officials

- Tom Nelson, Outagamie County County Executive
Joe Zepecki

Organizations

- Action Network of Wisconsin

=== Results ===
2025 Democratic Party of Wisconsin chairmanship election
| Party | Candidate | Round 1 | | | Round 2 | |
| Party | Candidate | Votes | % | Transfer | Votes | % |
|---|---|---|---|---|---|---|
| Democratic | Devin Remiker | 437 | 48.23% | + 48 | 485 | 53.89% |
| Democratic | Joe Zepecki | 330 | 36.42% | + 85 | 415 | 46.11% |
| Democratic | William Garcia | 139 | 15.34% | 139 | Eliminated | |
| Total active votes | | 906 | 100% | | 900 | 100.00% |
| Exhausted ballots | | - | | +6 | 6 | 0.60% |
| Total votes | | 906 | 100% | | 906 | 100% |

== See also ==
- 2025 Democratic National Committee chairmanship election
