= Dan Wikler =

American philosopher (born 1946)

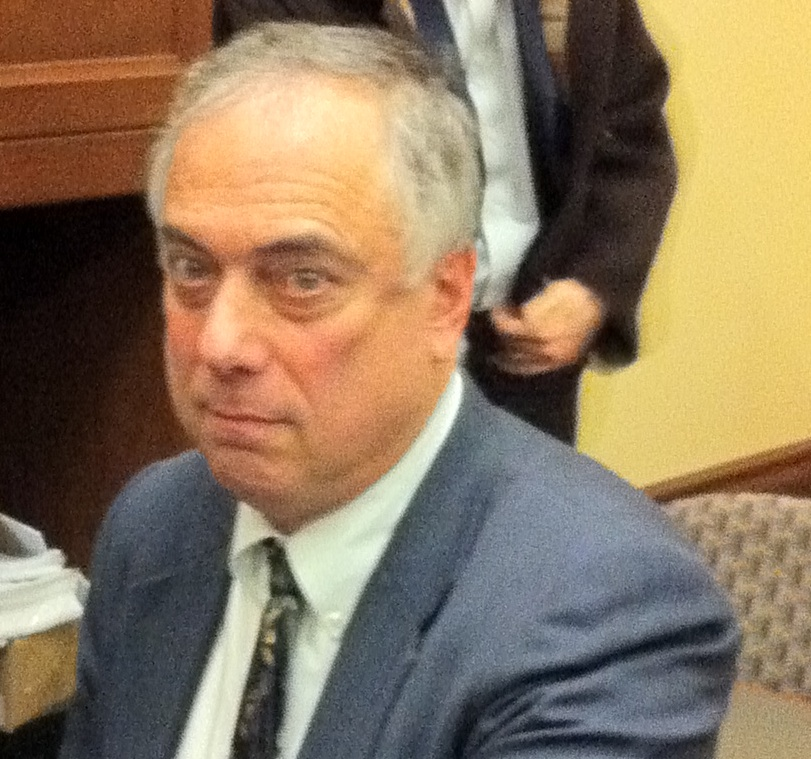
- Wikler in 2011
- Born: Daniel Isaac Wikler; May 21, 1946 (age 80); Lexington, Kentucky, U.S.
- Spouses: Lynn McDonald (m. 1967; div. 1986); Sarah Marchand
- Children: 3, including Ben

Academic background
- Education: Oberlin College (BA); University of California, Los Angeles (PhD)

Academic work
- School or tradition: Ethical philosophy
- Institutions: National Institute of Mental Health; World Health Organization; Harvard University
- Main interests: Political philosophy; Public health; Medical ethics; Global health; Population health

Daniel Isaac Wikler (born 1946) is an American public health educator, philosopher, and medical ethicist. He is the Mary B. Saltonstall Professor of Ethics and Population Health, Emeritus in the Department of Global Health and Population at the Harvard T.H. Chan School of Public Health in Boston. He is director and a core faculty member in the Harvard Program in Ethics and Health (PEH). His current research interests are ethical issues in population and international health, including the allocation of health resources, health research involving human subjects, organ transplant ethics, and ethical dilemmas arising in public health practice, and he teaches several courses each year. He is a fellow of the Hastings Center, an independent bioethics research institution.

== Career ==
Wikler is the son and third child of the late Abraham Wikler and Ada Fay Wikler. He was born and raised in Lexington, Kentucky, where he was graduated from Henry Clay High School. His sister is Marjorie Senechal.

Wikler earned a Bachelor of Arts degree in Philosophy from Oberlin College in Ohio in 1967. He served for two years (1968–1970) as Social Science Analyst in NIMH, the National Institute of Mental Health, in Washington, DC. He completed his doctorate in philosophy at the University of California at Los Angeles in 1976.

=== Early career ===
From 1972 to 1975, he was also awarded a Teaching Fellowship in the Department of Philosophy. He began his career working on natural language semantics at the intersection of philosophy, linguistics, and mathematics.

At the University of Wisconsin-Madison, he was professor of philosophy in the UW-Madison Department of Philosophy, professor in the Department of the History of Medicine's Program in Medical Ethics, and professor in the medical school of the University of Wisconsin, Madison, serving from 1975 to 2002.
From 1980 to 1981, he served on the President's Commission for the Study of Ethical Problems in Medicine in Washington, D.C., as Staff Philosopher for Biomedical and Behavioral Research.

He served as the first staff ethicist for the World Health Organization, and remains a consultant to several WHO programs. Prof. Wikler was co-founder (with Peter Singer and Helga Kuhse) and second president of the International Association of Bioethics and has served on the advisory boards of the Asian Bioethics Association and the Pan American Health Organization (AHO) Regional Program in Bioethics.

While at the World Health Organization, he instituted an international collaboration among philosophers and economists on ethical, methodological, and philosophical issues raised by WHO's work in measurement of the global burden of disease and in developing methods for improving health resource allocation.

=== Harvard University ===
Wikler writes, lectures, and advises in bioethics and professional ethics, both internationally and in Greater Boston, including at Harvard. During the summers, he also attends and teaches at a summer program at Fondation Brocher | Accueil outside Geneva. He is considered a world expert on ethics of the medical definition of death, specifically related to the dead-donor rule with regard to organ transplantation.

He serves on numerous Harvard University and other professional committees and advises several student groups, including the Harvard Undergraduate Bioethics Society (HUBS), sponsor in March 2008 of the National Undergraduate Bioethics Conference.

Until 2010, Wikler was the co-director of the Harvard T.H. Chan School of Public Health's Program on Ethical Issues in Global Health Research (formerly Program on Ethical Issues in International Health Research, through June 2008), a program of both empirical and theoretical research on ethical issues in health research, particularly in developing countries. Versions of the course have been taught in over a dozen developing nations, including Mexico, South Africa, Nigeria, India, Pakistan, and UAE. The Program offered fellowships for scholars in developing countries and sponsored an intensive each year for an international clientele. A version of that program is now operated by Harvard Chan School's ORARC (which nicknames it 'eager' - EIGHR).

== Personal life ==
Wikler is married to philosopher Sarah Marchand, and was formerly married to Lynn McDonald, a professor of social work research and United Nations consultant. He has three children: two from his first marriage—his daughter, Ruth Wikler, and eldest son, Ben Wikler, a political executive who has served as chair of the Democratic Party of Wisconsin since 2019 and previously worked as a senior advisor at MoveOn; and a son, Samuel Marchand, from his second marriage.

== See also ==
- American philosophy
- List of American philosophers
- List of Jewish American philosophers

== Select publications ==
- Studies in Philosophy and Health Policy (book series published by Cambridge University Press)
- Buchanan, Allen; Brock, Dan W.; Daniels, Norman; Wikler, Daniel. From Chance to Choice: Genetics and Justice. Cambridge University Press. ISBN 0-521-66977-4. 2000.
- PubMed Articles
- Wikler, D. and Cash, R. “Ethical Issues in Global Public Health” In Robert Beaglehole and Ruth Bonita, eds.. Global Public Health, Oxford University Press, 2009
- Wikler, D., "A crisis in medical professionalism: time for Flexner II". In Denis Arnold, ed., Ethics and the Business of Biomedicine, Cambridge University Press, 2009
- Wikler, D., Marchand, S., "Society’s Allocation of Resources for Health". In Kuhse H. and Singer P., A Companion to Bioethics. John Wiley and Sons, 2009
- Brock, D., Wikler, D., Ethical Challenges In Long-Term Funding For HIV/AIDS, Health Affairs 28(6), 2009, 1666–1677
- Schmidt, H., Voigt, K., Wikler, D. Carrots, Sticks, and Health Care Reform — Problems with Wellness Incentives, New England Journal of Medicine (10.1056/NEJMp0911552), 2009
- Cash, R., Wikler, D., Saxena, A., Capron, A. Casebook on Ethical Issues in International Health Research, Geneva: World Health Organization, 2010. Translated into five languages; second edition forthcoming.
