= Capacity (law) =

Legal aptitude to have rights and liabilities

Legal capacity is a quality denoting either the legal aptitude of a person to have rights and liabilities (in this sense also called transaction capacity), or the personhood itself in regard to an entity other than a natural person (in this sense also called legal personality).

== Natural persons ==
Capacity covers day-to-day decisions, including: what to wear and what to buy, as well as, life-changing decisions, such as: whether to move into a care home or whether to have major surgery.

As an aspect of the social contract between a state and its citizens, the state adopts a role of protector to the weaker and more vulnerable members of society. In public policy terms, this is the policy of parens patriae. Similarly, the state has a direct social and economic interest in promoting trade, so it will define the forms of business enterprise that may operate within its territory and lay down rules that will allow both the businesses and those that wish to contract with them a fair opportunity to gain value. This system worked well until social and commercial mobility increased. Now persons routinely trade and travel across state boundaries (both physically and electronically), so the need is to provide stability across state lines given that laws differ from one state to the next. Thus, once defined by the personal law, persons take their capacity with them like a passport whether or however they may travel. In this way, a person will not gain or lose capacity depending on the accident of the local laws, e.g. if A does not have capacity to marry her cousin under her personal law (a rule of consanguinity), she cannot evade that law by travelling to a state that does permit such a marriage (see nullity). In Saskatchewan Canada, an exception to this law allows married persons to become the common law spouse of other(s) prior to divorcing the first spouse. This law is not honored amongst other Canadian provinces.

=== Legal capacity ===
Standardized classes of person have had their freedom restricted. These limitations are exceptions to the general policy of freedom of contract and the detailed human and civil rights that a person of ordinary capacity might enjoy. For example, freedom of movement may be modified, the right to vote may be withdrawn, etc. As societies have developed more equal treatment based on gender, race and ethnicity, many of the older incapacities have been removed. For example, English law used to treat married women as lacking the capacity to own property or act independently of their husbands (the last of these rules was repealed by the Domicile and Matrimonial Proceedings Act 1973, which removed the wife's domicile of dependency for those marrying after 1974, so that a husband and wife could have different domiciles).

==== Minors ====
The definition of an infant or minor varies, each state reflecting local culture and prejudices in defining the age of majority, marriageable age, voting age, etc. In many jurisdictions, legal contracts, in which (at least) one of the contracting parties is a minor, are voidable by the minor. For a minor to undergo medical procedure, consent is determined by the minor's parent(s) or legal guardian(s). The right to vote in the United States is currently set at 18 years, while the right to buy and consume alcohol is often set at 21 years by U.S. state law. Some laws, such as marriage laws, may differentiate between the sexes and allow women to marry at a younger age. There are instances in which a person may be able to gain capacity earlier than the prescribed time through a process of emancipation. Conversely, many states allow the inexperience of childhood to be an excusing condition to criminal liability and set the age of criminal responsibility to match the local experience of emerging behavioral problems (see doli incapax). For sexual crimes, the age of consent determines the potential liability of adult accused.

As an example of liability in contract, the law in most of Canada provides that an infant is not bound by the contracts he or she enters into except for the purchase of necessaries and for beneficial contracts of service. Infants must pay fair price only for necessary goods and services. However, the British Columbia Infants Act (RSBC 1996 c.223) declares all contracts, including necessities and beneficial contracts of service, are unenforceable against an infant. Only student loans and other contracts made specifically enforceable by statute will be binding on infants in that province.

In contracts between an adult and an infant, adults are bound but infants may escape contracts at their option (i.e. the contract is voidable). Infants may ratify a contract on reaching age of majority. In the case of executed contracts, when the infant has obtained some benefit under the contract, he/she cannot avoid obligations unless what was obtained was of no value. Upon repudiation of a contract, either party can apply to the court. The court may order restitution, damages, or discharge the contract. All contracts involving the transfer of real estate are considered valid until ruled otherwise.

A minor (typically under 18 or 21) can disaffirm a contract made, no matter the case. However, the entire contract must be disaffirmed. Depending on the jurisdiction, the minor may be required to return any of the goods still in his possession. Also, barter transactions such as purchasing a retail item in exchange for a cash payment are generally recognized through a legal fiction not to be contracts due to the absence of promises of future action. A minor may not disavow such a trade.

- Disaffirmance – it must be timely. For example, a contract that goes beyond two years of reaching the age of majority would be considered ratified. Minors are still allowed to disaffirm, even if their age is misrepresented. They will not face tort violations. Some states do not allow disaffirmance if the consideration cannot be returned.
- Obligations – most states hold that a minor only must return the goods (consideration) if the goods are still in the minor's possession. Many states are requiring that the minor restore the adult (other party) to the state they were in before the contract was made. Minors are beginning to be held responsible for damages, wear, tear, etc. of the good in question upon return. A suit for tort is considered by some states to be an enforcement of the contract and is not allowed.
- Liability – for necessities, (1) the item contracted for must be necessary for minor's existence, (2) the value must be up to that of the current standard of living or financial/social status (not excessive in value), (3) the minor must not be under the care of a parent/guardian who is required to supply the item. A minor could be held liable for a contract for the purchase of luxury items (those that are not in the financial/social/standard of living range).
- Ratification – accepting and giving legal force to an obligation. Express ratification (for a minor) is expressly stating, orally or in writing that he/she intends to be bound by the contract. Implied ratification is when the conduct of the minor is inconsistent with that of disaffirmance or when minor fails to disaffirm an executed contract within a reasonable period.

Generally, the courts base their determination on whether the minor, after reaching the age of majority, has had ample opportunity to consider the nature of the contractual obligations he or she entered into as a minor and the extent to which the adult party to the contract has performed. As one court put it, "the purpose of the infancy doctrine is to protect 'minors from foolishly squandering their wealth through improvident contracts with crafty adults who would take advantage of them in the marketplace.'"

In Singapore, while individuals under the age of 21 are regarded as minors, sections 35 and 36 of the Civil Law Act 1909 provide that certain contracts entered into by minors aged 18 and above are to be treated as though they were adults. Additionally, the Minors' Contracts Act 1987 as applicable in Singapore and in England and Wales provides that a contract entered into by a minor is not automatically unenforceable and that a "court may, if it is just and equitable to do so, require the [minor] defendant to transfer to the plaintiff any property acquired by the defendant under the contract, or any property representing it".

==== Bankruptcy ====
If individuals find themselves in a situation where they can no longer pay their debts, they lose their status as credit-worthy and become bankrupt. States differ on the means whereby their outstanding liabilities can be treated as discharged and on the precise extent of the limits that are placed on their capacities during this time but, after discharge, they are returned to full capacity. In the United States, some states have spendthrift laws under which an irresponsible spender may be deemed to lack capacity to enter into contracts (in Europe, these are termed prodigality laws) and both sets of laws may be denied extraterritorial effect under public policy as imposing a potentially penal status on the individuals affected.

==== Enemy aliens and/or terrorists ====
During times of war or civil strife, a state will limit the ability of its citizens to offer help or assistance in any form to those who are acting against the interests of the state. Hence, all commercial and other contracts with the "enemy", including terrorists, would be considered void or suspended until a cessation of hostilities is agreed.

=== Medical decisional capacity ===
The capacity to render medical decisions is a complex area of medical law. Historically, in most western nations, medical decisions were largely imposed by physicians in a paternalistic model. Although United States courts began to recognize the primacy of patient autonomy as early as Schloendorff v. Society of New York Hospital (1914), the shift toward a patient-centered model of decision-making did not gain significant traction until the 1960s. This shift led, in turn, to the need for methods to determine whether patients were capable of making such decisions. Starting in the 1970s, forensic psychiatrist Loren Roth and bioethicist James Drane proposed approaches for assessing decisional capacity. These approaches were largely supplanted by the "four abilities" model of Paul Appelbaum and Thomas Grisso in the 1980s. The abilities included communicating a choice, understanding the medical situation, appreciate the risks and benefits of various interventions and demonstrating an ability to reason. Around the same time, Allen Buchanan and Dan Brock proposed a model for capacity assessment that was task-specific and threshold-based. Daniel Fogel and Ben Schwan have raised significant conceptual issues with the "four abilities" model. William Garrett and colleagues have also noted significant racial bias in the application of the "four abilities" model. More recently, Jacob Appel and Omar Mirza have advanced a values-based alternative approach to assessment that conceives of capacity assessment as an "intervention" rather than a "tool".

=== Mental capacity ===
==== Insanity, mental illness, or mental/medical condition ====
Loss of mental capacity occurs in individuals may have an inherent physical condition that prevents them from achieving the normal levels of performance expected from persons of comparable age, or their inability to match current levels of performance may be caused by contracting an illness. Whatever the cause, if the resulting condition is such that individuals cannot care for themselves, or may act in ways that are against their interests, those persons are vulnerable through dependency and require the protection of the state against the risks of abuse or exploitation. Hence, any agreements that were made are voidable, and a court may declare that person a ward of the state and grant power of attorney to an appointed legal guardian.

The UK's Mental Capacity Act 2005 or MCA sets out a two-stage test of capacity:

1. Is the person unable to make a particular decision?
2. Is the inability to make a decision caused by an impairment of, or disturbance in the functioning of, a person's mind or brain?

The MCA states an individual is unable to make their own decision, if they are unable to do at least one of four things:

1. Understand information given to them.
2. Retain that information long enough to be able to make the decision.
3. Weigh up the information available to make the decision.
4. Communicate their decision.

In England and Wales, this is a specific function of the Court of Protection, and all matters concerning persons who have lost, or expect soon to lose, mental capacity are regulated under the Mental Capacity Act 2005. This makes provision for lasting powers of attorney under which decisions about the health, welfare, and financial assets of a person who has lost capacity may be dealt with in that person's interests. In Ireland, the Assisted Decision-Making (Capacity) Act was passed in 2015. This Act addresses the capacity of people with intellectual disabilities. The general principles are set out in section 8 of the Act.

Under Singapore's Mental Capacity Act 2008, "a person lacks capacity in relation to a matter if at the material time the person is unable to make a decision for himself or herself in relation to the matter because of an impairment of, or a disturbance in the functioning of, the mind or brain". Where an individual lacks capacity on grounds of mental illness or senility, a relative or other responsible person may obtain a lasting power of attorney to make decisions concerning the "personal welfare" of the person lacking capacity, the "property and [financial] affairs" of the person, or both. Questions as to whether an individual has the capacity to make decisions either generally or with regard to a particular matter or class of matters are generally resolved by a judicial declaration and the court making the declaration may appoint one or more individuals to act as deputies for the person lacking capacity.

This sort of problem sometimes arises when people suffer some form of medical problem such as unconsciousness, coma, extensive paralysis, or delirious states, from accidents or illnesses such as strokes, or often when older people become afflicted with some form of medical/mental disability such as Huntington's disease, Alzheimer's disease, Lewy body disease, or similar dementia. Such persons are often unable to consent to medical treatment but otherwise handle their financial and other personal matters. If the afflicted person has prepared documents beforehand about what to do in such cases, often in a revocable living trust or related documents, then the named legal guardian may be able to take over their financial and other affairs. If the afflicted person owns their property jointly with a spouse or other able person, the able person may be able to take over many of the routine financial affairs. Otherwise, it is often necessary to petition a court, such as a probate court, that the afflicted person lacks legal capacity and allow a legal guardian to take over their financial and personal affairs. Procedures and court review have been established, dependent on the area of jurisdiction, to prevent exploitation of the incapacitated person by the guardian. The guardian periodically provides a financial accounting for court review.

In the Criminal Law, the traditional common law M'Naghten Rules excused all persons from liability if they did not understand what they were doing or if they did, that they did not know it was wrong. The consequences of this excuse were that those accused were detained indefinitely or until the medical authorities certified that it was safe to release them back into the community. This consequence was felt to be too draconian, and so statutes have introduced new defenses that will limit or reduce the liability of those accused of committing offenses if they were suffering from a mental illness at the relevant time (see the insanity and mental disorder defenses).

==== Intoxication ====
Although individuals may have consumed a sufficient quantity of intoxicant or drug to reduce or eliminate their ability to understand exactly what they are doing, such conditions are self-induced and so the law does not generally allow any defense or excuse to be raised to any actions taken while incapacitated. The most generous states do permit individuals to repudiate agreements as soon as sober, but the conditions to exercising this right are strict.

== Business entities ==
=== General and limited partnerships ===
There is a clear division between the approach of states to the definition of partnerships. One group of states treats general and limited partnerships as aggregate. In terms of capacity, this means that they are no more than the sum of the natural persons who conduct the business. The other group of states allows partnerships to have a separate legal personality which changes the capacity of the "firm" and those who conduct its business and makes such partnerships more like corporations.

=== Juridical persons ===
==== Corporations ====
The extent of a juridical person's capacity depends on the law of the place of incorporation and the enabling provisions included in the constitutive documents of incorporation. The general rule is that anything not included in the corporation's capacity, whether expressly or by implication, is ultra vires, i.e. "beyond the power" of the corporation, and so may be unenforceable by the corporation, but the rights and interests of innocent third parties dealing with the corporations are usually protected.

==== Limited Liability Companies ====
In American law, limited liability companies (LLCs) are legal persons. Some legal scholars have argued that they can be used to give legal capacity to software programs, including artificial intelligence.

==== Trade unions ====
In some states, trade unions have limited capacity unless any contract made relates to union activities.

=== Insolvent business entities ===
When a business entity becomes insolvent, an administrator, receiver, or other similar legal functionary may be appointed to determine whether the entity shall continue to trade or be sold so that the creditors may receive all or a proportion of the money owing to them. During this time, the capacity of the entity is limited so that its liabilities are not increased unreasonably and to the detriment of the existing creditors.

== See also ==
- Capacity in English law
