= Lynn McDonald (psychologist) =

American academic and social worker

- Education: Oberlin College (BA); University of Maryland, Baltimore (MS); University of California, Irvine (PhD)
- Spouses: Dan Wikler (m. 1967; div. 1986); Michael Edwards (m. 2006)
- Children: 2, including Ben (son)
- Relatives: John McDonald (father)

Marilyn R. McDonald is an American academic and social worker. She works as a senior scientist at the Wisconsin Center for Education Research, and University of Wisconsin–Madison. She is also a consultant for the United Nations.

== Early life and education ==
McDonald was the daughter of John Warlick McDonald, a diplomat, and spent her childhood in Europe, the Middle East and Washington, D.C.

In the 1960s, McDonald studied philosophy at Oberlin College. She went on to get her master's degree from the University of Maryland, Baltimore and received her PhD in psychology from the University of California, Irvine in 1976.

== Career ==
After earning her doctorate, McDonald became licensed as a clinical therapist and a family therapist.

McDonald started her career as a social worker in the University of California, Los Angeles's Neuropsychiatric Institute.

McDonald was co-principal researcher of a $2.9 million National Institute of Drug Abuse (NIDA) five-year grant to study the application of FAST within ethnically specific groups. McDonald was previously the principal researcher of a five-year $1.4 million grant from the U.S. Department of Health and Human Services Center for Substance Abuse Prevention. Grants from the DeWitt Wallace Reader's Digest Foundation and the Kraft Corporation have helped to disseminate FAST nationally. She was a tenure track faculty member in social work at University of Wisconsin–Madison from 1975 to 1987. She also holds a clinical faculty appointment in the University of Wisconsin–Madison Department of Psychiatry.

In 2008, McDonald became a professor of social work research at Middlesex University. She retired from that position as of 2019.

=== Families and Schools Together (FAST) ===
McDonald created Families and Schools Together (FAST) in 1988. The program was set up to help to build multiple layers of protective factors around at-risk children - including intensive parental involvement - and also promotes students' resilience in adversity and reduction of long-term negative outcomes. Its research-based activities bring families into the school for weekly meetings. McDonald has remained the chairperson of FAST.

FAST appears to have dramatically increased parental involvement in children's educational success in 25 states, and across diverse ethnic and socio-economic groups, although predominantly in low-income families. FAST is adaptable, able to "meet the needs of specific target populations."

FAST was endorsed as a program by the Office of Juvenile Justice and Delinquency Prevention and also the Center for Substance Abuse Prevention because it is an "evidence based program for strengthening families." FAST has also started being used in Australia in order to help Indigenous youth in schools. FAST has also been successfully used in Canada.

A 2019 Cochrane systematic review of FAST involving 10 randomized controlled trials with over 9000 children failed to identify important outcomes for children and their parents.

== Personal life ==
McDonald is married to Michael Edwards, and was formerly married to Dan Wikler, a philosopher, public health educator, and professor at the Harvard T.H. Chan School of Public Health. She has two children: a daughter, Ruth Wikler, and a son, Ben Wikler, who is a political executive who has served as chair of the Democratic Party of Wisconsin since 2019 and previously worked as a senior advisor at MoveOn.

== Publications ==
- Fletcher, Joan; Fairtlough, Anna; McDonald, Lynn (2013-06-01). "Engaging Young Parents and Their Families in a Multi-family Group Work Intervention: Lessons from a Pilot in England". Practice. 25 (3): 151–167. doi:10.1080/09503153.2013.799647. ISSN 0950-3153. S2CID 72177536.
- McDonald, Lynn; FitzRoy, Sarah; Fuchs, Irene; Fooken, Insa; Klasen, Henrikje (2012-01-01). "Strategies for high retention rates of low-income families in FAST (Families and Schools Together): An evidence-based parenting programme in the USA, UK, Holland and Germany". European Journal of Developmental Psychology. 9 (1): 75–88. doi:10.1080/17405629.2011.632134. ISSN 1740-5629. S2CID 144184661.
- McDonald, Lynn (2011-02-14). "Build Protective Factors for Children in Developing Countries During Economic Crises by Scaling Up a UNODC Evidence-Based Family Skills Programme: Five Case Studies from One Model". doi:10.2139/ssrn.1761562. S2CID 155352823. SSRN 1761562.
- Kratochwill, Thomas R.; McDonald, Lynn; Levin, Joel R.; Scalia, Phyllis A.; Coover, Gail (2009-08-01). "Families and schools together: An experimental study of multi-family support groups for children at risk". Journal of School Psychology. 47 (4): 245–265. doi:10.1016/j.jsp.2009.03.001. PMID 19480887.
- Warren, Keith; Moberg, D. Paul; McDonald, Lynn (2006-01-19). "FAST and the Arms Race: The Interaction of Group Aggression and the Families and Schools Together Program in the Aggressive and Delinquent Behaviors of Inner-City Elementary School Students". Journal of Primary Prevention. 27 (1): 27–45. doi:10.1007/s10935-005-0021-9. ISSN 0278-095X. PMID 16421656. S2CID 24671211.
- Kratochwill, Thomas R.; McDonald, Lynn; Levin, Joel R.; Young Bear-Tibbetts, Holly; Demaray, Michelle K. (2004-09-01). "Families and Schools Together: an experimental analysis of a parent-mediated multi-family group program for American Indian children". Journal of School Psychology. 42 (5): 359–383. doi:10.1016/j.jsp.2004.08.001.
- McDonald, Lynn; Sayger, Thomas V. (1998-05-11). "Impact of a Family and School Based Prevention Program on Protective Factors for High Risk Youth". Drugs & Society. 12 (1–2): 61–85. doi:10.1300/J023v12n01_06. ISSN 8756-8233.
- McDonald, Lynn; Billingham, Stephe; Conrad, Tammy; Morgan, Arthur; O, Nancy; Payton, Estella (1997-01-01). "Families and Schools Together (FAST): Integrating Community Development With Clinical Strategies". Families in Society. 78 (2): 140–155. doi:10.1606/1044-3894.754. ISSN 1044-3894. S2CID 72437620.
