= Ben Wikler =

American political organizer (born 1981)

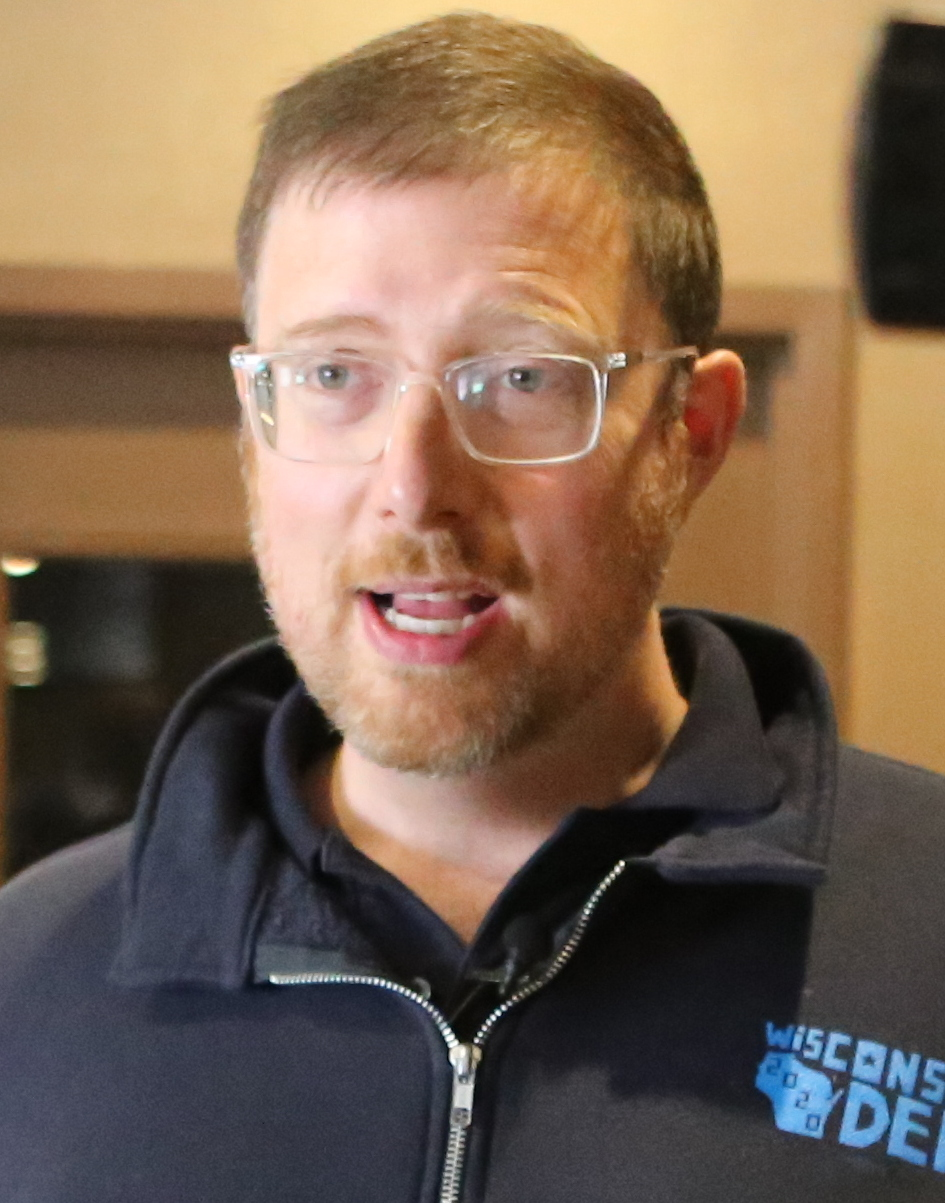
- Wikler in 2021

Chair of the Wisconsin Democratic Party
- In office July 1, 2019 – July 1, 2025
- Preceded by: Martha Laning
- Succeeded by: Devin Remiker

Personal details
- Born: Benjamin McDonald Wikler; February 3, 1981 (age 45)
- Party: Democratic
- Spouse: Elizabeth McCarthy (m. 2007)
- Children: 3
- Relatives: Lynn McDonald (mother); Dan Wikler (father); John McDonald (grandfather); Abraham Wikler (grandfather)
- Education: Harvard University (BA)

Benjamin McDonald Wikler (born February 3, 1981) is an American political organizer who served as the chair of the Democratic Party of Wisconsin from July 2019 to July 2025. He is a former senior advisor at MoveOn.

He is the author of This is the Plan: How to End America's Meltdown and Save Democracy, published in July 2026.

== Early life and education ==
Ben Wikler grew up in Madison, Wisconsin, where he cofounded The Yellow Press, a student-run newspaper at Madison West High School. While a student there, he won election to the student senate and launched Students United in Defense of Schools with Peter Koechley to demand increased school funding and succeeded in allowing students to elect a representative to the Madison School Board. He also organized protests against granting Coca-Cola exclusive access to Madison schools. During high school he worked for Wisconsin gubernatorial candidate Ed Garvey and on the first congressional campaign of now-Senator Tammy Baldwin.

In 1999 he began attending Harvard University, where he studied economics. While a student there, he cofounded the Student Global AIDS Campaign (SGAC) and the Harvard AIDS Coalition. He represented the SGAC at the United Nations General Assembly Special Session on AIDS in New York City, the UN World Youth Forum in Senegal, and the International AIDS Conference in Barcelona. He also worked for economist Jeffrey Sachs and interned for U.S. Senator Russ Feingold. He was editor-in-chief of the Harvard Review of Philosophy and contributed to The Onion.

While at Harvard, he joined TeamFranken, a group of students who assisted Al Franken in writing his 2003 book Lies and the Lying Liars Who Tell Them: A Fair and Balanced Look at the Right. Wikler took a term off to help Franken "through every step of the process" of writing the book. "When I was staying with the Frankens [to finish the book], we'd get up around 10 or 11 and then work for fourteen or fifteen hours," he told an interviewer. "We'd stop only for meals and a little break before dinner. It was exhausting, but it was also exhilarating, because he's so funny. We were constantly cracking up."

Wikler graduated cum laude in 2003 with a degree in economics.

== Career ==
After college, Wikler became a founding producer for Al Franken's radio show, The Al Franken Show, where he assisted with Franken's book The Truth (with Jokes). "It would not have been possible without Ben Wikler," Franken writes. "Ben reminds me of myself when I was his age, except smarter, wiser, more worldly, better read, more passionate, much much taller, and just as funny. Ben was with me every step of the way on this book. I cannot thank him enough."

In 2006, Wikler served as press secretary for Sherrod Brown's U.S. Senate campaign and was the first editor-in-chief of Comedy 23/6, a comedy news website created as a coproduction of the Huffington Post and IAC.

In March 2007, he became campaign director for Avaaz, where he helped grow the organization to over ten million members. He ran campaigns on climate change, poverty, human rights, and other issues, and also managed the technology and communication teams. He hosted the Fossil of the Day Awards at UN climate negotiations from 2007 to 2009 for the Climate Action Network. In late 2011, Wikler became the executive vice president of Change.org.

In 2011, Wikler briefly returned to Wisconsin to protest the passage of Act 10, which struck down public employee collective bargaining rights.

In January 2012, Wikler and Aaron Swartz launched a radio show and podcast, The Flaming Sword of Justice, on We Act Radio WPWC 1480 AM in Washington DC, in which he interviews other campaigners from the U.S. and around the world. Guests have included Ricken Patel, Zack Exley, and Eli Pariser.

=== The Good Fight ===
In November 2013, Wikler relaunched his show as The Good Fight, a podcast and radio program sponsored by MoveOn.org. The show's first episode featured Senator Al Franken and reached the #1 spot on the U.S. iTunes podcast charts. The Good Fight was an hour-long weekly podcast and radio show that, according to its website, "brings you a mix of comedy, activism, and David versus Goliath battles told from the behind-the-slingshot point of view." Guests ranged from little known grassroots activists to U.S. Senators. Episodes aired on 1480 AM in D.C. Scholar and activist Lawrence Lessig made an appeal on his blog for his readers to support a Kickstarter campaign to fund The Good Fight. The podcast ended in 2016.

=== MoveOn.org ===
Wikler became MoveOn.org's Washington director in early 2014.

He led the organization's efforts to encourage Elizabeth Warren to run for president, putting him at odds with friend Howard Dean, who endorsed Hillary Clinton. Dean declined to criticize the effort and Wikler, saying, "I appreciate you trying to pick a fight between Ben and I [sic]. I happen to know Ben, and he's one of the smartest people under 35 in the entire country."

In late 2015 Wikler led MoveOn's advocacy on behalf of Syrian immigrants, helping to organize and coordinate efforts by a number of nonprofit groups.

In 2017, Wikler led grassroots protests against the attempted repeal of the Affordable Care Act, helping contribute to the Senate's failure to pass the ACA-repealing American Health Care Act of 2017.

=== Chair of the Democratic Party of Wisconsin ===
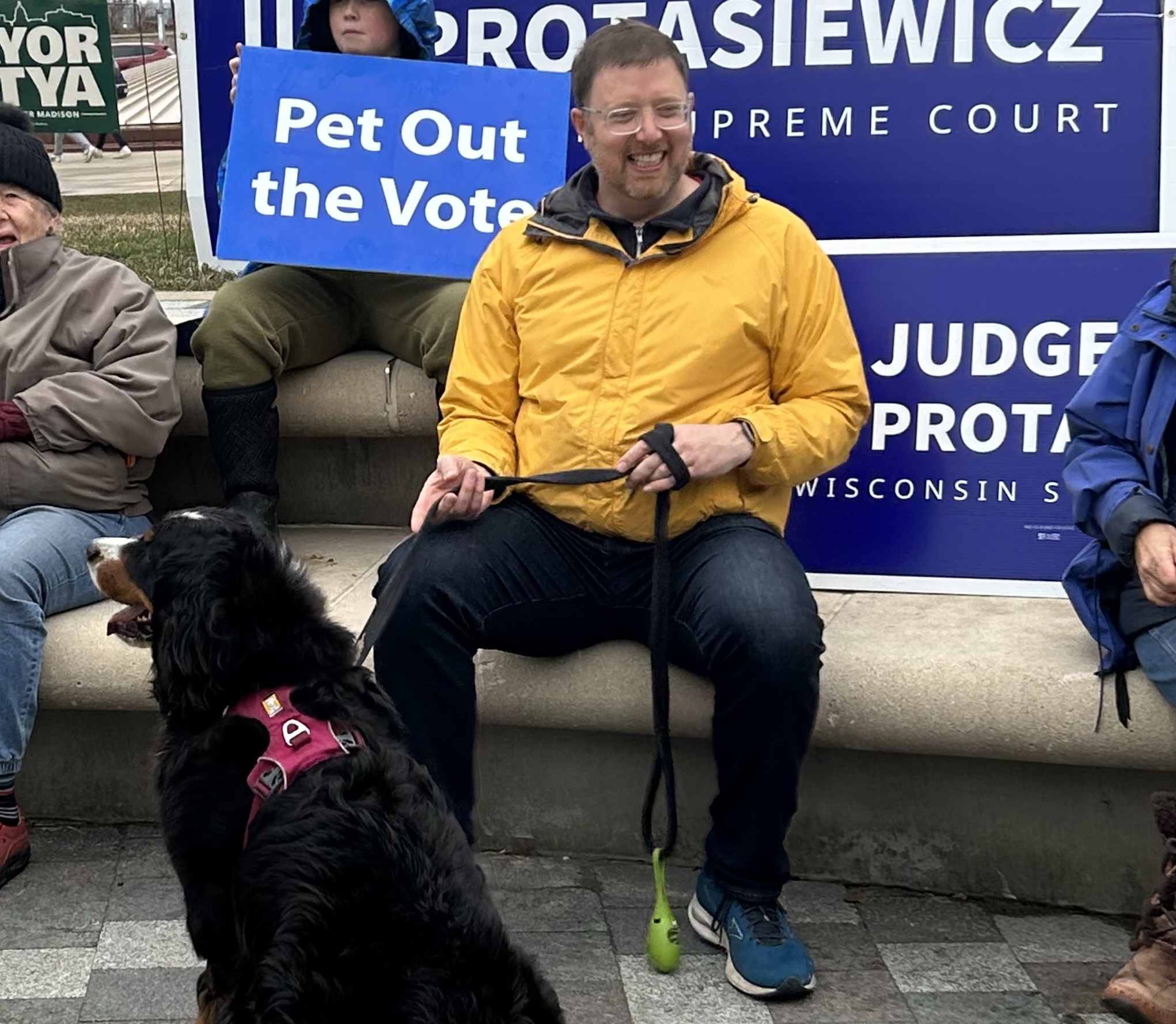
Wikler at UW–Madison's Library Mall on the day of the 2023 Wisconsin spring general election (which included a highly-prominent state supreme court election)

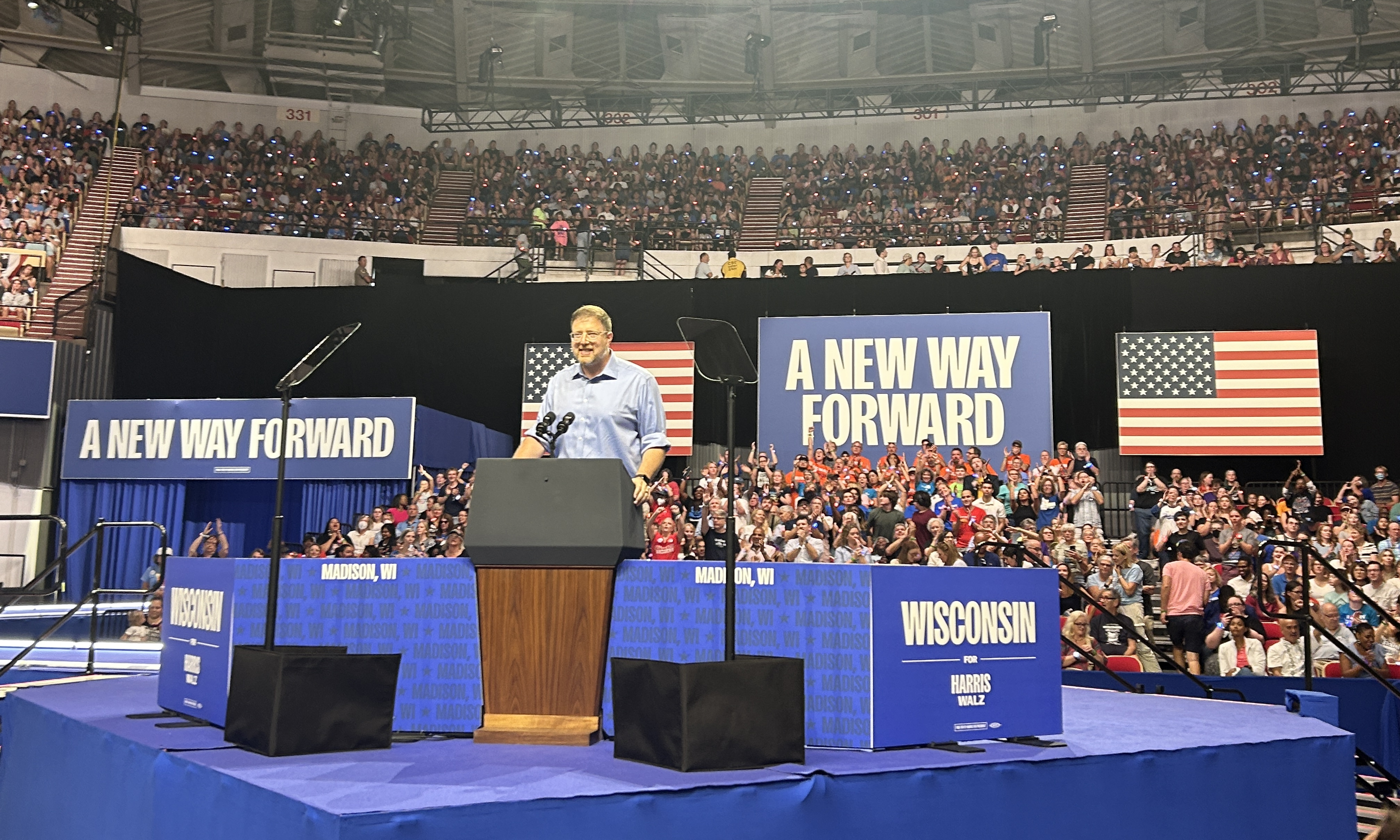
Wikler speaking at the Alliant Energy Center during a September 2024 rally for Kamala Harris's presidential campaign

In 2018, Wikler and his family moved to Wisconsin, where he volunteered with the Democratic Party of Wisconsin as Tony Evers defeated Scott Walker.

Wikler announced his campaign for chair of the Democratic Party of Wisconsin (DPW) on February 21, 2019, running on a slate with Felesia Martin and Lee Snodgrass. On June 2, 2019, Wikler was elected chair of DPW. He received 1,006 votes, beating opposing candidate state Representative David Bowen who earned 233 votes.

Between 2019 and 2023, the Democratic Party of Wisconsin won seven of the past ten statewide races in a state considered by political operatives to be "50-50." Wikler focused on grassroots organizing, saying "Unlike almost any other state party in the country, we have a field team of organizers working across Wisconsin to build neighborhood teams and work with county parties to get volunteers out on doors." In 2020, Wisconsin flipped the presidential race from red to blue. In 2022, Governor Tony Evers became the first Democrat to win a Wisconsin gubernatorial race during a Democratic presidency in more than half a century. In 2023, Wisconsin Democrats invested $10 million – the most in history for a state Supreme Court race – to elect Janet Protasiewicz as a state Supreme Court justice and end conservative control of Wisconsin's highest court for the first time in 15 years. The new majority ended the GOP’s gerrymander of the state legislature later that year.

Wikler raised about $230 million for the Democratic Party of Wisconsin from 2020-2025. Party leaders praised his efforts to turn the Wisconsin state party around. Former House Speaker Nancy Pelosi called Ben Wikler "Big Ben", who "is recognized nationally as a preeminent state party chair… His reputation is a great one." Senate Democratic Leader Chuck Schumer declared him "one of the best chairs of a state party – not just today, but ever."

On April 10, 2025, Wikler announced his decision not to run for re-election for chair of Wisconsin Democratic Party. A new chair was elected in June 2025.

=== 2025 Democratic National Committee Chair race ===
On December 1, 2024, Wikler announced his intention to run for chair of the Democratic National Committee. In his launch video, Wikler declared that "The soul of the Democratic Party is the fight for working people… What has made a difference in Wisconsin can make a difference everywhere. We need a nationwide permanent campaign, with a battle plan and resources for every state and territory in the country. We have to think and build long-term—while showing, through our actions, who we are."

On February 1, 2025, Wikler came in second with 134 votes in the DNC Chair race after winner Ken Martin, who had 246 votes.

=== Book ===
In July 2026, W. W. Norton & Company published Wikler's book, This Is The Plan: How to End America's Meltdown and Save Democracy. Wikler's book tour included stops at Ezra Klein's podcast at the New York Times. Klein describes Wikler as having "turned [the Wisconsin Democratic] party into a fund-raising, door-knocking powerhouse."

== Personal life ==
Wikler met his wife Beth (née McCarthy) when putting posters together for a protest. She also attended Harvard, graduating cum laude with a degree in social studies and a certificate in health policy. They married in Little Rock, Arkansas, on November 24, 2007. They live with their three children and dog in Madison, Wisconsin. His father, Daniel I. Wikler, is a philosopher and ethicist at Harvard School of Public Health; his mother, Lynn McDonald, is a retired psychologist. Wikler is Jewish.

== Works ==
- This is the Plan: How to End America's Meltdown and Save Democracy, 2026.

Party political offices
Preceded by Martha Laning	Chair of the Wisconsin Democratic Party; 2019–2025	Succeeded by Devin Remiker
