= Allen Buchanan =

American philosopher (born 1948)

Allen Edward Buchanan
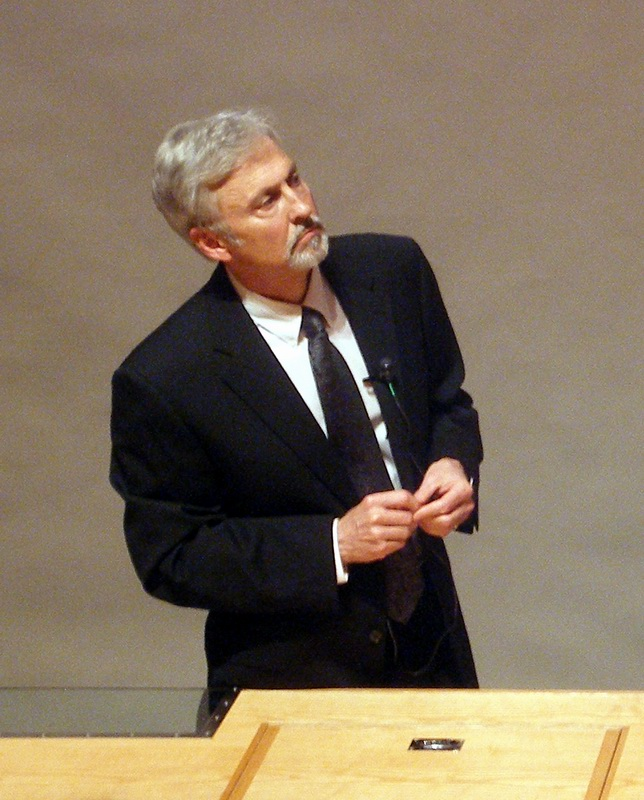
- 2009
- Born: 1948 (age 77–78)
- Occupations: Philosopher, ethicist, bioethicist, professor

Allen Edward Buchanan (born 1948) is a moral, political and legal philosopher. As of 2022, he held multiple academic positions: Laureate Professor of Philosophy at the University of Arizona, Distinguished Research Fellow at Oxford University, Visiting Professor of the philosophy of international law at the Dickson Poon School of Law at King's College, London, and James B. Duke Professor Emeritus at Duke University.

== Education and career ==
Professor Buchanan received his bachelor's degree from Columbia University in 1970 and his PhD from the University of North Carolina at Chapel Hill in 1975. Dr. Buchanan's initial academic job was at the University of Minnesota, where he was promoted to associate professor of philosophy with tenure. He was a professor at the University of Arizona from 1982 to 1993; a professor at the University of Wisconsin–Madison from 1993 to 1998; before returning to Arizona for 4 years. He was recruited to Duke in 2001.

Earlier in his career, Buchanan served as a staff philosopher for the President's Commission on Medical Ethics; served on the Advisory Council for the National Human Genome Research Institute; and was a Fellow at the National Humanities Center. He is a fellow of the Hastings Center, an independent bioethics research institution.

== Philosophical work ==
He has written six books covering such topics as Marx, applied ethics (especially bio-medical ethics), social justice, and international justice, including the foundations of international law.

His academic collaborators have included Daniel W. Brock, Norman Daniels, Robert Keohane, and Daniel Wikler.

== Bibliography ==
- Better Than Human (Oxford University Press, 2011)
- Beyond Humanity (Oxford University Press, 2011)
- Buchanan, Allen (2003) Justice, Legitimacy, and Self-Determination: Moral Foundations for International Law
- Macedo, Stephen; Buchanan, Allen E. (2003) Secession and Self-Determination (336 pages)
- Buchanan, Allen; Margaret Moore (2003) States, Nations, and Borders: The Ethics of Making Boundaries (376 pages)
- Buchanan, Allen; Brock, Dan W.; Daniels, Norman; Wikler, Daniel (2000) From Chance to Choice: Genetics and Justice. Cambridge University Press. ISBN 0-521-66977-4.
- Buchanan, Allen (1999) The Quebec Secession Issue: Democracy, Minority Rights, and the Rule of Law, Privy Council Office, Canada.
- Spece, Roy G.; Shimm, David S.; Buchanan, Allen E. (1996) Conflicts of Interest in Clinical Practice and Research (472 pages)
- Buchanan, Allen (1995) Democratization, Secession and the Rule of International Law
- Buchanan, Allen (1991) Secession: The Morality of Political Divorce From Fort Sumter to Lithuania and Quebec
- Buchanan, Allen (1991) Secession: The Morality of Political Divorce from Fort Sumter to Lithuania (174 pages)
- Buchanan, Allen; Brock, Dan W. (1990) Deciding for Others: The Ethics of Surrogate Decision Making (440 pages)
- Buchanan, Allen; Brock, Dan W. (1989) Deciding For Others: The Ethics of Surrogate Decision Making
- Buchanan, Allen (1985) Ethics, Efficiency, and the Market
- Buchanan, Allen (1982) Marx and Justice: The Radical Critique of Liberalism
- Buchanan, Allen (1979) Deriving Welfare Rights from Libertarian Rights (16 pages)

Articles published

Buchanan, Allen, Keohane, Robert O. "The Preventive Use of Force: A Cosmopolitan Institutional Proposal." Ethics and International Affairs, 18(1), 1-22, 22 p. 2004.

== See also ==
- Liberal eugenics
