= Devin Remiker =

American politician (born 1992/93)

Chair of the Wisconsin Democratic Party
- Incumbent
- Assumed office July 1, 2025
- Preceded by: Ben Wikler

Personal details
- Born: 1992 or 1993 (age 33–34) Two Rivers, Wisconsin, U.S.
- Party: Democratic
- Spouse: Emma
- Education: University of Wisconsin–La Crosse (BA)
- Website: Campaign website

Devin Remiker (born 1992/1993) is an American Democratic politician from Wisconsin. He has been the chair of the Democratic Party of Wisconsin since July 2025. He previously served as executive director of the party from 2020 through 2024.

== Early life ==
Devin Remiker was born and raised in Two Rivers, Wisconsin, in Manitowoc County. He graduated from Two Rivers High School in 2010 and went on to attend the University of Wisconsin–La Crosse.

== Political career ==
Remiker first became involved in electoral politics while in college, working for the campaign of state representative Steve Doyle. He then managed the campaign of Tim Kabat, who was elected mayor of La Crosse, Wisconsin, in 2013. He was then hired onto the campaign staff of U.S. representative Ron Kind for his 2014 re-election campaign.

Remiker graduated from college in 2014, and went to work as a field coordinator for the Wisconsin's State Senate Democratic Caucus (SSDC). (Note: The Wisconsin equivalent of the federal Democratic Senatorial Campaign Committee.) He then rejoined Ron Kind's staff as campaign manager for his 2016 re-election. In 2018, Remiker was hired as political director of the Democratic Party of Wisconsin. Remiker played an important role in the party's strategy for campaigning in the midst of the COVID-19 pandemic, and was then named executive director of the party after the 2020 general election. During the 2025 Wisconsin Supreme Court election, Remiker led the "People vs. Musk" campaign, which sought to turn the election into a referendum on Elon Musk—who had personally contributed more than $25 million to support the conservative candidate in that election.

In April 2025, Wisconsin Democratic Party chair Ben Wikler announced that he would not run for re-election; shortly after his announcement, Remiker announced his candidacy. Two other candidates ultimately entered the race. Remiker picked up endorsements from many of the incumbent Democratic legislative leaders and was endorsed by the outgoing chair, Wikler. The election was held at the Wisconsin Democratic Party state convention on June 15, 2025, utilizing ranked-choice voting for the first time. Remiker won the election, receiving 53.9% of the vote in the second round.

== Notes ==
Party political offices
Preceded by Ben Wikler	Chair of the Wisconsin Democratic Party; 2025–present	Incumbent
