= John Steinbrink =

American politician

Member of the Wisconsin State Assembly from the 65th district
- In office January 6, 1997 – January 7, 2013
- Preceded by: Robert Wirch
- Succeeded by: Tod Ohnstad

President of the Pleasant Prairie Board of Trustees
- Incumbent
- Assumed office 1995

Member of the Pleasant Prairie Board of Trustees
- Incumbent
- Assumed office 1989

Member of the Pleasant Prairie Town Board
- In office 1985–1989

Personal details
- Born: John Peter Steinbrink; April 17, 1949 (age 77) Kenosha, Wisconsin, U.S.
- Party: Democratic
- Spouse: Roberta
- Children: 3
- Profession: grain farmer, former dairy farmer

John Peter Steinbrink Sr. (born April 17, 1949) is an American politician and was a Democratic Party member of the Wisconsin State Assembly, representing the southeastern part of Kenosha County for eight terms, from 1997 until 2013. He has been President of the Pleasant Prairie Village Board since 1995.

== Biography ==
Born in Kenosha, Wisconsin, Steinbrink graduated from George Nelson Tremper High School. He then went to Carthage College and University of Wisconsin–Madison Farm and Industry short course. He was a dairy and grain farmer. He has served continuously on the Pleasant Prairie, Wisconsin board since 1985, bridging the 1989 transition from Town to Village.

He was elected to the Assembly in the 65th Assembly District in 1996, defeating popular Republican Jeff Toboyek from the City of Kenosha. He was re-elected seven times in the 65th District.

However, in 2011 the new Republican majority used their power to redraw the state's legislative maps, and Steinbrink was one of eleven Democrats who were drawn out of their old districts entirely. Pleasant Prairie was separated from neighboring Kenosha and gerrymandered into a district with distant rural communities of western Kenosha County. Steinbrink was forced to run against incumbent Republican Samantha Kerkman in the 61st District and lost by ten points.
