= John Warlick McDonald =

American diplomat (1922–2019)

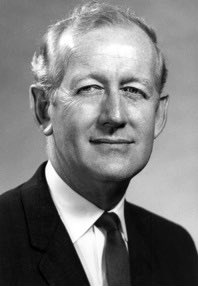

John Warlick McDonald (February 18, 1922 – May 17, 2019) was an American diplomat. He was appointed to the rank of ambassador twice by Jimmy Carter and twice by Ronald Reagan to represent the United States at United Nations World Conferences. From 1974 to 1978, he was the deputy director general of the International Labour Organization.

McDonald was born in Koblenz, Germany, while his father was stationed there with the U.S. military. He had B.A. and a J.D. degrees from the University of Illinois at Urbana–Champaign and graduated from the National War College in 1967. After law school, McDonald entered the U.S. Foreign Service.

McDonald co-founded Global Water and later founded the Institute for Multi-Track Diplomacy.

== Personal life ==
McDonald married Barbara Stewart in 1943. They had four children, including Lynn McDonald, and six grandchildren, including Ben Wikler.

== IMTD ==
McDonald founded The Institute for Multi-Track Diplomacy (IMTD) in 1998; the concept of Multi-track Diplomacy was derived from the academic work of Dr. Louise Diamond and Ambassador McDonald. Track One Diplomacy is State to State Diplomacy. But he and Diamond held that there were several other practical types of Diplomacy which could strengthen the relationships of peoples and governments, these included business to business, religious group to religious group, academic group diplomacy, professional peace building diplomacy, activism, research, training, and philanthropy. Subsequent tracks of Diplomacy have been added to include women's groups, sports and the arts.

Throughout its 25 years, IMTD's mission embraced a wide range of peace building activities. These include a peace-building soccer/football tour throughout contested Kashmir, water sharing agreements crafted by engineers between states which were technically at war, and conflict resolution training and reconciliation efforts around the world. Working into his nineties, Ambassador McDonald and staff worked from their offices in Arlington, Virginia and traveled wherever their expertise was sought throughout the world.

== Awards ==
McDonald was a 1994 nominee for the Nobel Peace Prize. In 2009, he received the Peacemaker Award from the Association for Conflict Resolution.

McDonald received honorary degrees from Salisbury University, St. John's University, Teikyo University and Mount Mercy University.
