= Martha Laning =

21st century American politician

Chair of the Democratic Party of Wisconsin
- In office June 6, 2015 – July 1, 2019
- Preceded by: Mike Tate
- Succeeded by: Ben Wikler

Personal details
- Born: 1962 or 1963 (age 63–64)
- Party: Democratic
- Education: University of Wisconsin–Madison (BA, MBA)

Martha Kniess Laning (born 1962/1963) is an American businesswoman, activist, and Democratic politician from Sheboygan County, Wisconsin. She was the chair of the Democratic Party of Wisconsin from 2015 through 2019.

== Early life and career ==
Laning received her undergraduate and master's degrees from the University of Wisconsin. She was employed by Target Stores and Kraft Foods before moving to Plymouth, Wisconsin, where she worked as executive director of the Plymouth Intergenerational Center. She was also one of the founders of the organization, which was started in 2009. While she was at the organization, she helped raise around $4.7 million to build the center. She resigned as director "for personal reasons" in 2013.

== Political career ==
In 2013, Laning made her first bid for elected office. She announced that she would run in the 2014 election for Wisconsin Senate on the Democratic Party ticket, challenging incumbent Republican state senator Joe Leibham in the 9th Senate district. Although she had no prior political experience, and the district was considered safely Republican, Laning felt that her fundraising skills could give her an advantage. In early 2014, Leibham announced that he would step out of the Senate race to instead run for U.S. House of Representatives; the Republicans instead nominated county supervisor Devin LeMahieu of Oostburg for the 9th Senate district. Laning was defeated in the election, losing by about 20 percentage points.

In 2015, Laning announced her candidacy to succeed outgoing Democratic Party of Wisconsin chairman Mike Tate. The campaign for the chairmanship was crowded and contentious; Laning faced former party chair Joe Wineke, Milwaukee consultant Jason Rae, and former state representatives Jeff Smith and Stephen Smith. Prior to the party convention in Milwaukee, Jeff Smith controversially offered Laning the party's executive directorship if she exited the race; she declined the offer, while Smith ultimately dropped out of the race and endorsed Laning. On June 5, 2015, she was elected chairwoman at the party's annual convention in Milwaukee receiving 721 votes to Rae's 428 and Wineke's 191.

Laning was a super-delegate, and pledged support to whoever won the presidential primary in Wisconsin. Despite this statement, the primary was won by Bernie Sanders and Laning cast her vote for Hillary Clinton.

In July 2017, Laning was re-elected to the head of the Democratic Party of Wisconsin. She had three challengers for the seat of head of party.

Party political offices
Preceded by Mike Tate	Chair of the Wisconsin Democratic Party; 2015–2019	Succeeded by Ben Wikler
