= Democratic Party of Wisconsin =

Wisconsin affiliate of the Democratic Party

- Chairperson: Devin Remiker
- Governor: Tony Evers
- Lieutenant Governor: Sara Rodriguez
- Senate Minority leader: Dianne Hesselbein
- Assembly Minority leader: Greta Neubauer
- Headquarters: Madison, WI
- National affiliation: Democratic Party
- Colors: Blue
- U.S. Senate (Wisconsin seats): 1 / 2
- U.S. House (Wisconsin seats): 4 / 8
- Statewide offices: 5 / 5
- Seats in the Wisconsin Senate: 18 / 33
- Seats in the Wisconsin Assembly: 53 / 99

Election symbol

Website
- wisdems.org

The Democratic Party of Wisconsin is the affiliate of the Democratic Party in the U.S. state of Wisconsin. It is currently headed by chair Devin Remiker.

Important issues for the state party include support for workers and unions, strong public education, and environmental protection. It currently controls two of Wisconsin's eight U.S. House seats, one of its U.S. Senate seats, and the governorship. Additionally, Democratic-aligned justices control a majority on the state Supreme Court.

== Current leadership ==
Party leaders are elected to two year terms at the state party conventions held in odd numbered years. The current leadership terms expire on July 1, 2027.

- Chair: Devin Remiker
- 1st Vice Chair: Sarah Godlewski
- 2nd Vice Chair: Joshua Taylor
- Secretary: Kim Butler
- Treasurer: Randy Udell

== History ==
=== Territorial era ===
During Wisconsin's territory years, Jacksonian democracy was dominant and, thanks largely to Andrew Jackson's reputation and presidency, the Democratic Party was seen as the party of the common man. State and federal Democrats shared a claim of opposing the "money power" of eastern wealth and central banks, and other Jacksonian policies—such as the appropriation of new lands from Native American populations and the distribution of those lands to new settlers—bolstered Democratic politicians and helped to establish a durable voter base in the new territories. The early Democratic Party in Wisconsin was also seen as championing property, trade, and economic policies which favored the lead mining, fur trading, and lumber harvesting laborers who were coming to populate the new territory. This was the base of early Democrats such as Territorial Governor Henry Dodge.

=== Early statehood through the Civil War ===
The party continued to expand with the industrialization of cities along the rivers and coasts of Wisconsin and the growth of the urban workforce. The Democratic Party dominated the first decade of state government, winning 25 of the first 30 elections for statewide partisan offices, while holding large majorities in the Wisconsin Legislature and among the congressional delegations.

Frays began to appear in the Democratic coalition, however, as national Democrats were seen as favoring Southern priorities over new states' priorities—such as federal spending for harbor and railroad improvements. These issues persisted through the presidencies of Democrats James K. Polk and Franklin Pierce as petitions from Wisconsin Democrats fell on deaf ears in Washington.

Immigration would also become a fault line within the party and the state in these early years. The Democrats initially thrived on their appeal to immigrant laborers, bolstered by language they had added to the Wisconsin Constitution which allowed new immigrants to quickly attain voting rights. Their principal opposition, however, the Whig Party, held more nativist positions and over time began exploiting the resentments between immigrants and non-immigrants and between Protestants and Catholics. This division also involved the issue of prohibition, which was supported by a majority of the Wisconsin voting population in a nonbinding referendum in 1853, but was anathema to immigrant populations.

The issue of slavery further exacerbated internal Democratic Party divisions as national Democrats pushed policies to abolish the Wilmot Proviso and allow for the establishment of slavery in new U.S. states and territories. A formal split occurred in 1848, as anti-slavery Democrats broke off and formed the Free Soil Party along with members of the abolitionist Liberty Party. The Free Soil Party quickly found a foothold in southeastern Wisconsin, with a base of support from settlers who had arrived in Wisconsin from New England and New York. The splits significantly diminished the majority of the Democratic statewide vote, but left Democrats still in control of statewide offices. State Democrats were able to reclaim some Free Soil supporters and stave off further losses by publicly endorsing more free soil positions, such as a Joint Resolution from the legislature to instruct Wisconsin's congressional delegation to oppose any expansion of slavery into new territories. But national Democratic policies continued to undermine those efforts, as the Compromise of 1850 and its Fugitive Slave Act component further inflamed anti-slavery sentiment in Wisconsin and other northern states. Anti-slavery emotion was further excited with the arrest of Milwaukee abolitionist newspaper publisher Sherman Booth, who had led a mob to free Joshua Glover in defiance of the Fugitive Slave Act.

By 1853, internal factions were publicly lobbing accusations of corruption at fellow Democrats. Most notably Wisconsin circuit court judge Levi Hubbell was impeached at the instigation of fellow Democrat Edward G. Ryan, and William A. Barstow, who was seeking the Democratic nomination for Governor in 1853, was accused of having accepted bribes while in office as Secretary of State.

Despite the internal divisions, Barstow won the governorship and Wisconsin Democrats were able to maintain power in the state until anti-slavery factions finally coalesced with northern Whigs into the new Republican Party in 1854. The Kansas–Nebraska Act, which repealed the anti-slavery components of the Missouri Compromise, was the final straw for anti-slavery northerners.

The 1855 gubernatorial election was tainted by more accusations of corruption and fraud and ultimately had to be settled by the state Supreme Court, where Democrat Edward G. Ryan took a leading role in prosecuting the case against Democratic Governor William Barstow. Democratic voting power in the state continued to wane as Republicans won full control of the Legislature in 1856 and retained the governorship in 1857. By the time the American Civil War started, Republicans held every statewide partisan office.

The Civil War further split the state Democratic Party between War Democrats and Peace Democrats. Despite a strong showing by Democratic candidates in the 1862 congressional elections, Republicans continued to hold full power over state government throughout the war. Democrats would only hold the governorship for 8 of the next 100 years.

=== Late 19th century ===
Republicans dominated statewide politics in Wisconsin through much of the post-war 19th century, and cultivated special interests in railroads, the lumber industry, and unionized labor. Their political power in the state was further enhanced with their ability to deliver significant funding from the Republican-dominated federal government for projects in Wisconsin. Democrats in these years were mostly limited to a few geographic power bases in Dane County, the city of Milwaukee, and in several of the counties along the eastern coast of the state.

Despite being in the ideological minority, Wisconsin Democrats did take advantage of several controversies and Republican excesses to win significant state-wide elections during this period.

Following the Panic of 1873, Democrats allied with Liberal Republicans and members of the Granger movement to create a coalition known as the Reform Party. The coalition elected a majority of the Wisconsin Assembly in 1873 and elected Democrat William Robert Taylor in the 1873 Wisconsin gubernatorial election. They went on to enact the so-called "Potter Law", which created the Wisconsin Railroad Commission and enabled significant new regulation of the railroad industry.

Later in the 1870s, as the Long Depression continued, the Greenback movement created another opportunity for Democrats to hold power in the state. The alliance between Democrats and Greenbackers in the 1878 Wisconsin Legislature led to the creation of the office of state insurance commissioner.

In 1889, the Republican-dominated state legislature responded to labor agitation by passing what became known as the Bennett Law. The law was primarily concerned with raising the legal working age to 13 and mandating that parents and guardians must ensure children between age 7 and 14 were receiving at least 12 weeks of school per year. However, section 5 of the law became a massive controversy in the state as it defined "schools" as only those institutions which gave instruction in the English language. Wisconsin, at the time, still contained a large number of schools which gave instructions in German, Polish, and Scandinavian languages.

The backlash against the Bennett Law unified disparate cultural, religious, and ideological factions of Wisconsin's German, Scandinavian, Irish, Polish, and Catholic communities, and fueled massive Democratic wave elections in 1890 and 1892. Democrats won all state-wide offices in those years and sustained majorities in both chambers of the legislature for the first time since 1854. The Legislative majorities also coincided with the expiration of Senate terms, which allowed them to choose two Democrats to represent Wisconsin in the U.S. Senate.

But as quickly as the Democratic majorities appeared, they evaporated with the Panic of 1893 and the resulting inter-party feuding over silver currency. Edward S. Bragg, who was one of the most prominent and influential Wisconsin Democrats of the late 19th century, famously quit the party after the nomination of William Jennings Bryan in 1896 and went on to become a supporter of Robert La Follette, Theodore Roosevelt, and the rising Progressive wing in the Republican Party.

Between 1894 and 1932, no Democratic candidate for Governor of Wisconsin received more than 42% of the state-wide vote, and Republicans routinely held super-majority control of both chambers of the Legislature. Democrats won only 1 state-wide election during that forty year stretch, when Paul O. Husting won the 1914 election for United States Senate.

=== 20th century ===
The Republicans led by La Follette, and later by his sons, employed many progressive policies in the state of Wisconsin but led to a split within the party, creating the Wisconsin Progressive Party. Nationally, progressive policies were also ascendant with the masses, and were adopted by prominent Republicans like Theodore Roosevelt and then by Democrats like Franklin D. Roosevelt. The Democratic Party was nearly relegated to third party status in the state during the early 20th century as Republicans and Progressives were stronger competitors for state offices, and even the Socialist Party surpassed the Democratic party in legislative representation for several years in the early 20th century. The Republicans' tight control of Wisconsin politics lasted until the late 1940s, when the Wisconsin Progressive Party began to collapse and many of the remaining progressives fled to the Democratic Party. This was facilitated in the creation of the Democratic Organizing Committee, which brought together young liberals and former progressives, such as like Gaylord Nelson, James Edward Doyle, Horace W. Wilkie, and Fred A. Risser. The new coalition brought the state party more in line with the progressive policies of the national party. The Democrats won their first major victory when William Proxmire was elected in the late 1950s. Wisconsin in the 1980s and 1990s was characterized by competitive two-party politics for control of the governorship, other state constitutional offices, the state legislature, and U.S. Senate seats.

=== 21st century ===
In the first decade of the 21st century, Wisconsin government was fairly evenly divided between the Republican and Democratic parties, as both parties held various statewide offices and at alternating times held control of one or both houses of the Legislature. This changed with the 2010 general election, when a national Republican voter wave helped to elect a Republican Governor and Republican majorities in both the State Senate and State Assembly. With full control of state government, one of the Republicans' first acts was the controversial 2011 Wisconsin Act 10, the "budget repair bill" which stripped collective bargaining rights from public employee unions. Following mass protests in the state capital, Democratic senators fled the state in an attempt to deny a quorum and slow down or prevent the passage of the bill. This attempt ultimately failed, but the controversy led to two years (2011 & 2012) of senate recall elections in addition to a gubernatorial recall election. The recalls gave the Democrats a brief senate majority in 2012; this majority was ultimately lost to new senate maps later that year.

The main effect of the 2010 election, however, was that it allowed Republicans to control the redistricting process following the 2010 census. They used this power to draw a significantly gerrymandered map for the 2011–2021 decade. This gerrymander was frequently cited as the worst, or one of the worst, in the country. Under the maps implemented by the Republican redistricting law (2011 Wisconsin Act 43) Democrats have not been able to win more than 43% of either the State Assembly or Senate. New maps were implemented in 2023, with some success in flipping legislative seats, but as of February 2026 Democrats remain unable to capture a majority.

In 2018, Democrats swept all statewide offices, electing Tony Evers as Governor, Mandela Barnes as Lieutenant Governor, Josh Kaul as Attorney General, Sarah Godlewski as State Treasurer, and reelecting Doug La Follette as Secretary of State, while also reelecting United States Senator Tammy Baldwin. Despite this substantial victory, where Democrats received more than 52% of the popular vote in State Assembly elections, they won only 42% of the State Senate seats and only 36% of Assembly seats. After Donald Trump's upset victory in the 2016 United States presidential election—when he became the first Republican in 28 years to win Wisconsin's 10 electoral votes—Wisconsin returned to the Democratic column in the 2020 presidential election, and Wisconsin was again identified as one of the most evenly-divided states in the country. Wisconsin flipped back to the Republican column in the 2024 general election, granting its 10 electoral votes to Trump.

With the state's legislative gerrymander looming large, the party focused on a strategy to replace the map and reform the redistricting process. A major push in the federal courts to try to get a ruling against partisan gerrymandering was defeated by the United States Supreme Court, which ruled in the case Gill v. Whitford that partisan gerrymandering was not judiciable by federal courts.

With no remaining hope of striking down the 2011 gerrymander, the party then turned its attention to the 2020 redistricting cycle, where state legislative Republicans would either have to make a deal with Governor Evers on a new map, or let the issue go back to the courts for a remedial solution. In the intervening years, the state political parties had become increasingly active in the state's technically nonpartisan judicial elections. It was considered a failure when the Democratic Party could not field a liberal candidate in the 2017 Wisconsin Supreme Court election, but they redoubled their efforts in the subsequent years and supported liberal candidates to victory in supreme court elections in 2018 and 2020, bringing the ideological divide down to 4–3 in favor of conservatives.

As the 2020 redistricting cycle began, Evers sought to gain support for a nonpartisan citizen redistricting commission, similar to a compromise plan utilized in the 1950s to break what had then been a long gridlock over the maps. Republicans, however, rejected the compromise and continued to pursue a maximalist approach. With the parties unable to compromise, the issue was sent to the courts. Democrats sought relief in the federal district courts, which had handled redistricting in Wisconsin in 1982, 1992, and 2002, when the state had previously failed to reach a legislative compromise. Republicans sought help from the 4–3 conservative Wisconsin Supreme Court, which had not heard a redistricting case since 1964, and had said as recently as 2002 that they lacked the proper constitutional, legal, or procedural tools to handle redistricting.

Despite that history, the Wisconsin Supreme Court complied with the Republican Party's request and took up the case. After a messy process, the court ultimately selected a Republican plan, in a 4–3 vote along ideological lines, which changed very little from the 2011 map. Under the new map, Republicans expanded their already-substantial legislative majorities and reached a supermajority in the Wisconsin Senate. A year after the map decision, however, the 2023 Wisconsin Supreme Court election flipped the Wisconsin Supreme Court's majority from 4–3 conservative to 4–3 liberal. The legislative gerrymander was often discussed during the 2023 campaign, and after the election, Democrat-aligned groups promised to revisit the redistricting case in the state court. The controversy over the maps led to threats from legislative Republicans to impeach the newest justice, Janet Protasiewicz, but after finding little popular or legal support for their impeachment threat, they backed down. A new challenge to the gerrymander was launched on August 2, 2023, a day after the start of the new court term. In December 2023, the Wisconsin Supreme Court ruled in the case, Clarke v. Wisconsin Elections Commission, saying the state legislative maps were unconstitutional and scheduled a process to implement remedial maps before the 2024 Wisconsin elections. As part of this process, governor Evers' remedial map was passed by the state legislature, with all but two Democrats voting against, on February 13, 2024. Said remedial maps were then signed by Evers on February 20, 2024.

During this era, the party political coalitions were also shifting in Wisconsin and nationally, as rural voters and white voters without a college education moved toward the Republican Party of Donald Trump, while suburban and college-educated voters fled that party. Margins shrank in old Republican strongholds in the suburbs around Milwaukee, and turnout soared in overwhelmingly Democratic college towns and overwhelmingly Republican rural communities.

Wisconsin Democrats completed their comeback in the 2026 elections. Evers endorsed Milwaukee County executive David Crowley as his successor, and Crowley went on to win the 2026 Wisconsin gubernatorial election with 54% of the vote—this was the largest margin for a Democrat in a Wisconsin gubernatorial election since 1982, and represented the first time since 1962 in which a Democratic governor of Wisconsin was succeeded by another Democrat. In the concurrent legislative and congressional elections, Democrats won majorities in both chambers of the Wisconsin Legislature and achieved a 4–4 congressional delegation. Crowley's victory was also notable as the first time an African American won a statewide election in Wisconsin.

== Ideology ==
The Democratic Party of Wisconsin is a proponent of the Wisconsin Idea and includes centrists, conservatives, liberals, and progressives. Top issues for the party include support for workers and unions, strong public education, and environmental protection. Since the 2010 passage of the Affordable Care Act, Wisconsin Democrats have prioritized fully expanding Medicaid in the state, a policy that Republicans have blocked.

== Elected officials ==
Democrats hold all statewide offices in Wisconsin except 1 U.S. Senate seat and the state Treasurer's office. The following is a list of Democratic statewide, federal, and legislative office holders as of January 3, 2025:

=== Members of Congress ===
Democrats hold two of Wisconsin's eight seats in the U.S. House of Representatives and one of Wisconsin's two seats in the U.S. Senate.

==== U.S. Senate ====
Democrats have controlled Wisconsin's Class I seat in the U.S. Senate since 1957:

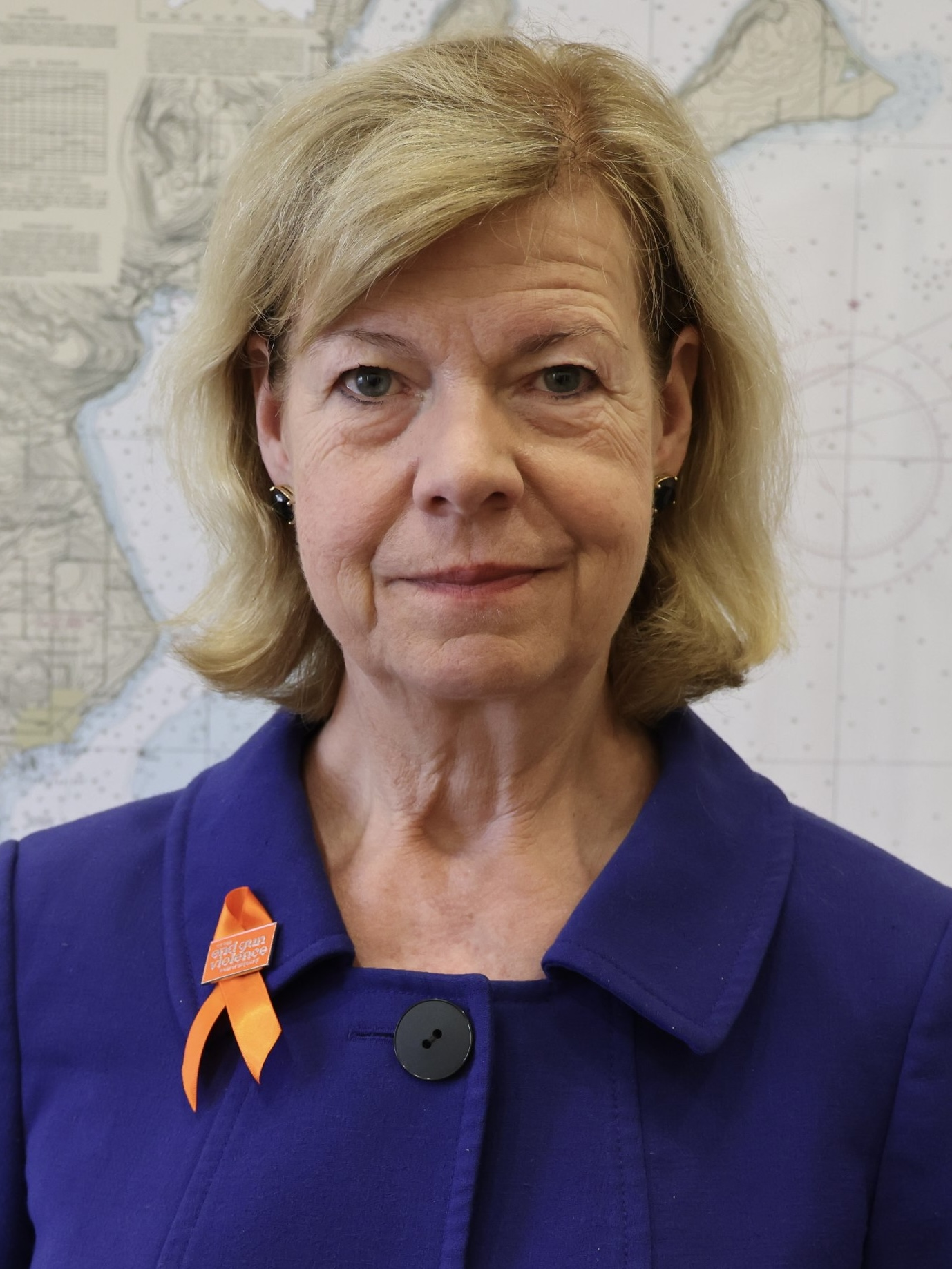
Junior U.S. Senator Tammy Baldwin
(United States Senate Democratic Conference Secretary)

==== U.S. House of Representatives ====
District	Member	Photo
1st	Mitchell Berman (elect)	
2nd	Mark Pocan	
3rd	Rebecca Cooke (elect)	
4th	Gwen Moore	

=== Statewide constitutional officers ===
- Governor: Tony Evers → David Crowley (elect)
- Lieutenant Governor: Sara Rodriguez → Sarah Godlewski (elect)
- Attorney General: Josh Kaul
- Secretary of State: Sarah Godlewski → JoCasta Zamarripa (elect)
- State Treasurer: Yee Leng Xiong (elect)
- Superintendent of Public Instruction: Jill Underly
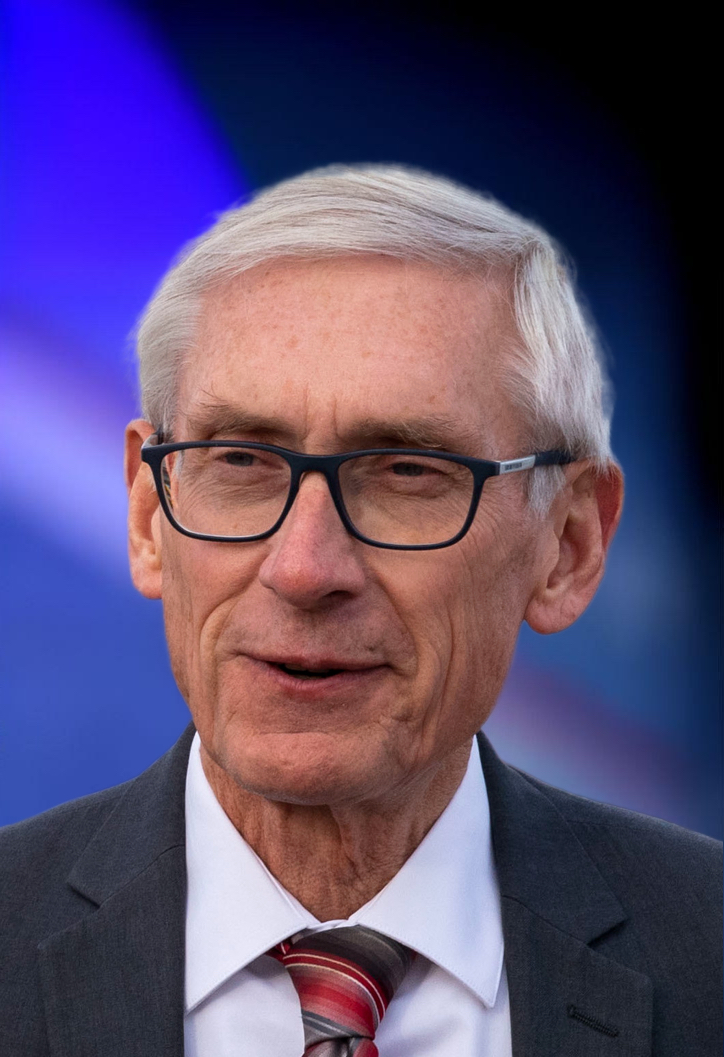
Tony Evers

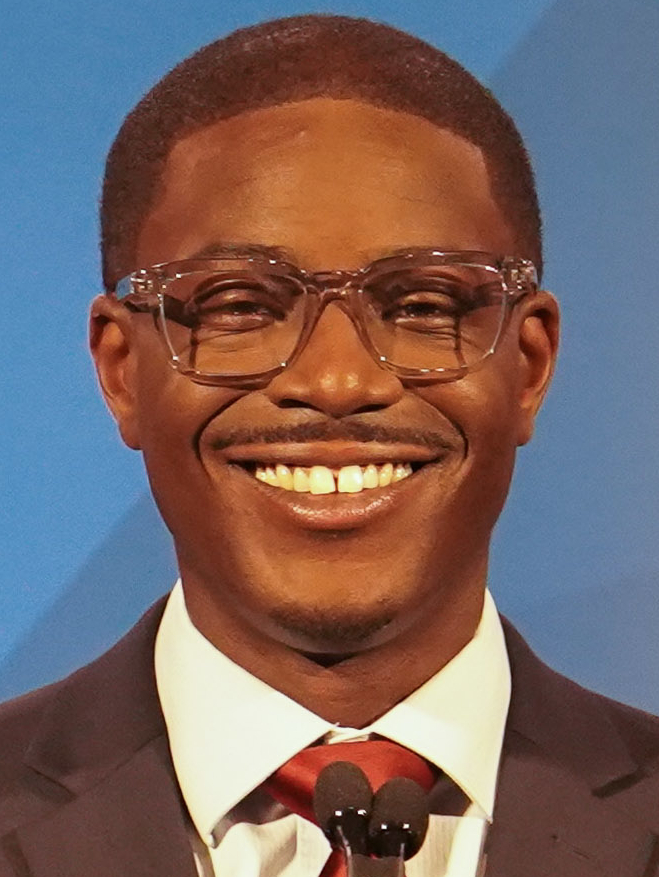
David Crowley

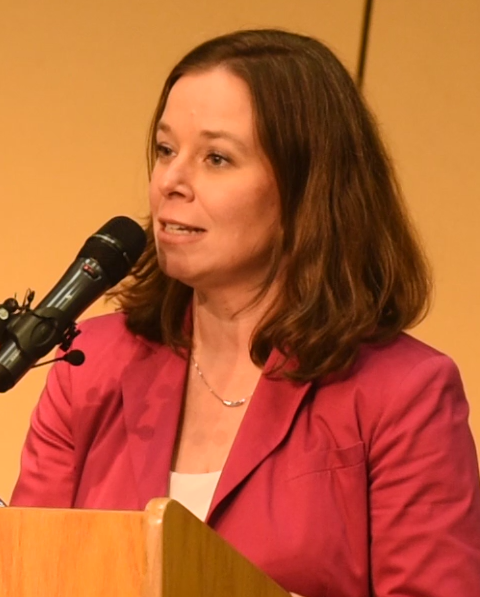
Sara Rodriguez

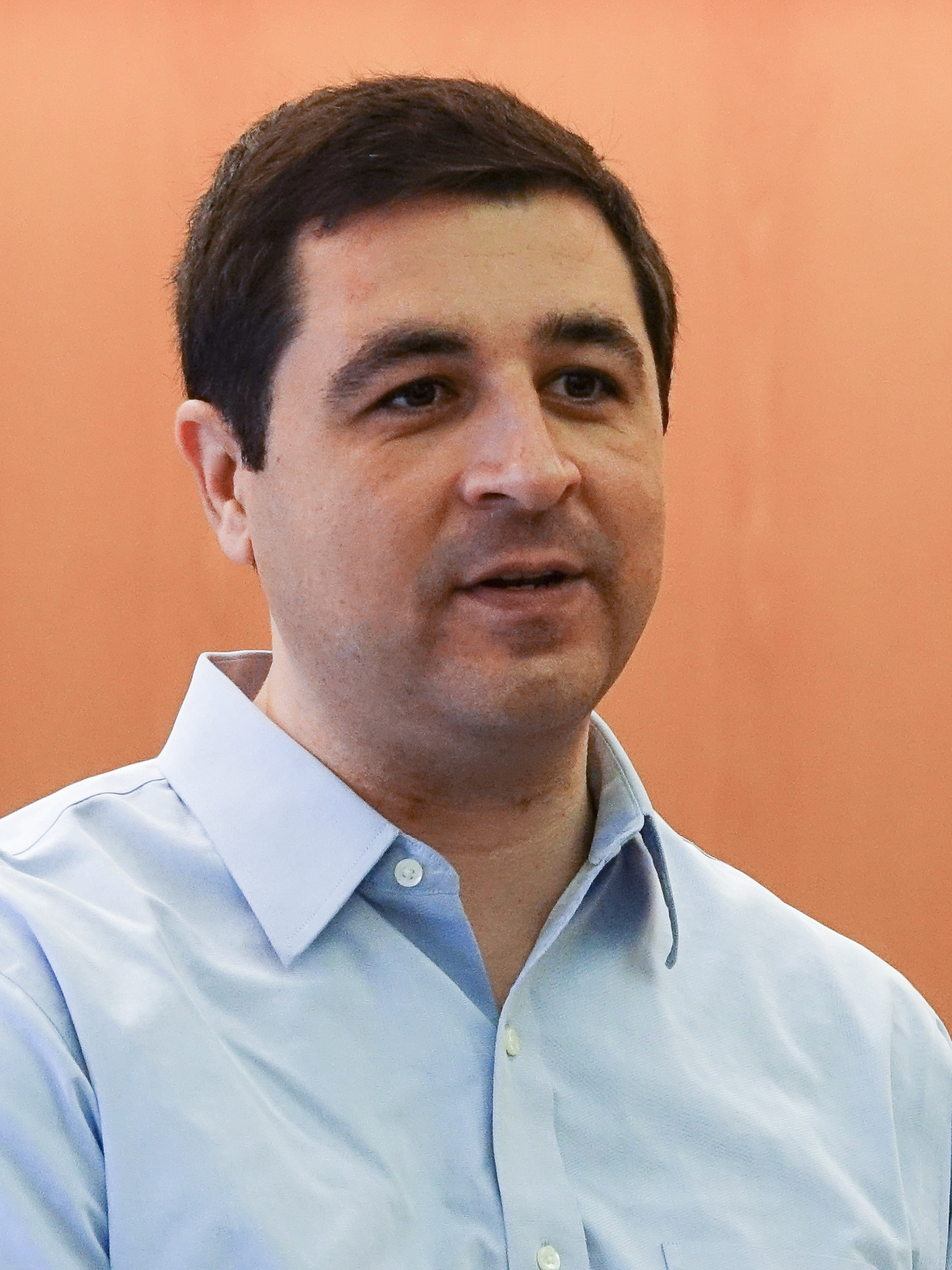
Josh Kaul

Sarah Godlewski

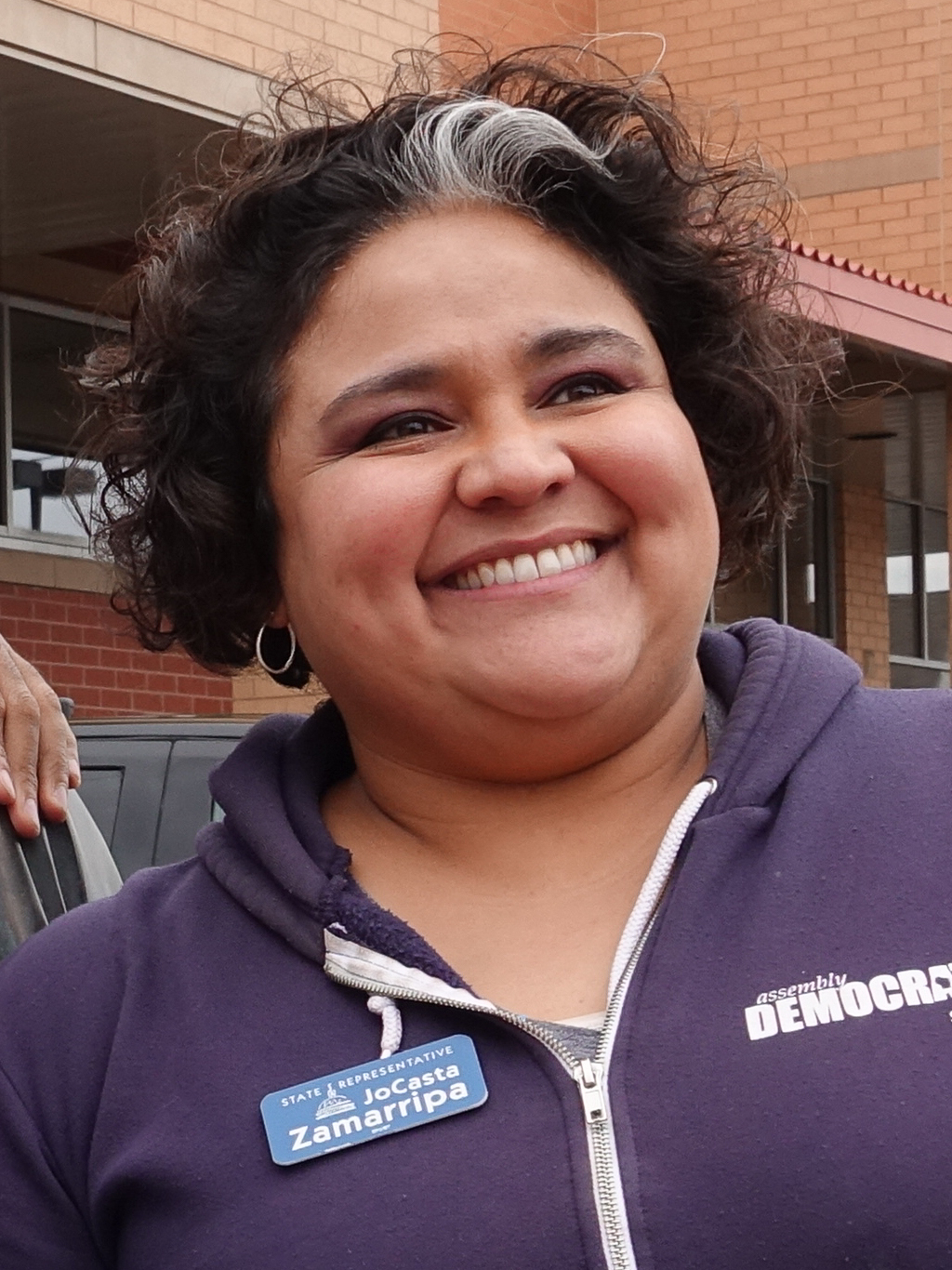
JoCasta Zamarripa

Yee Leng Xiong

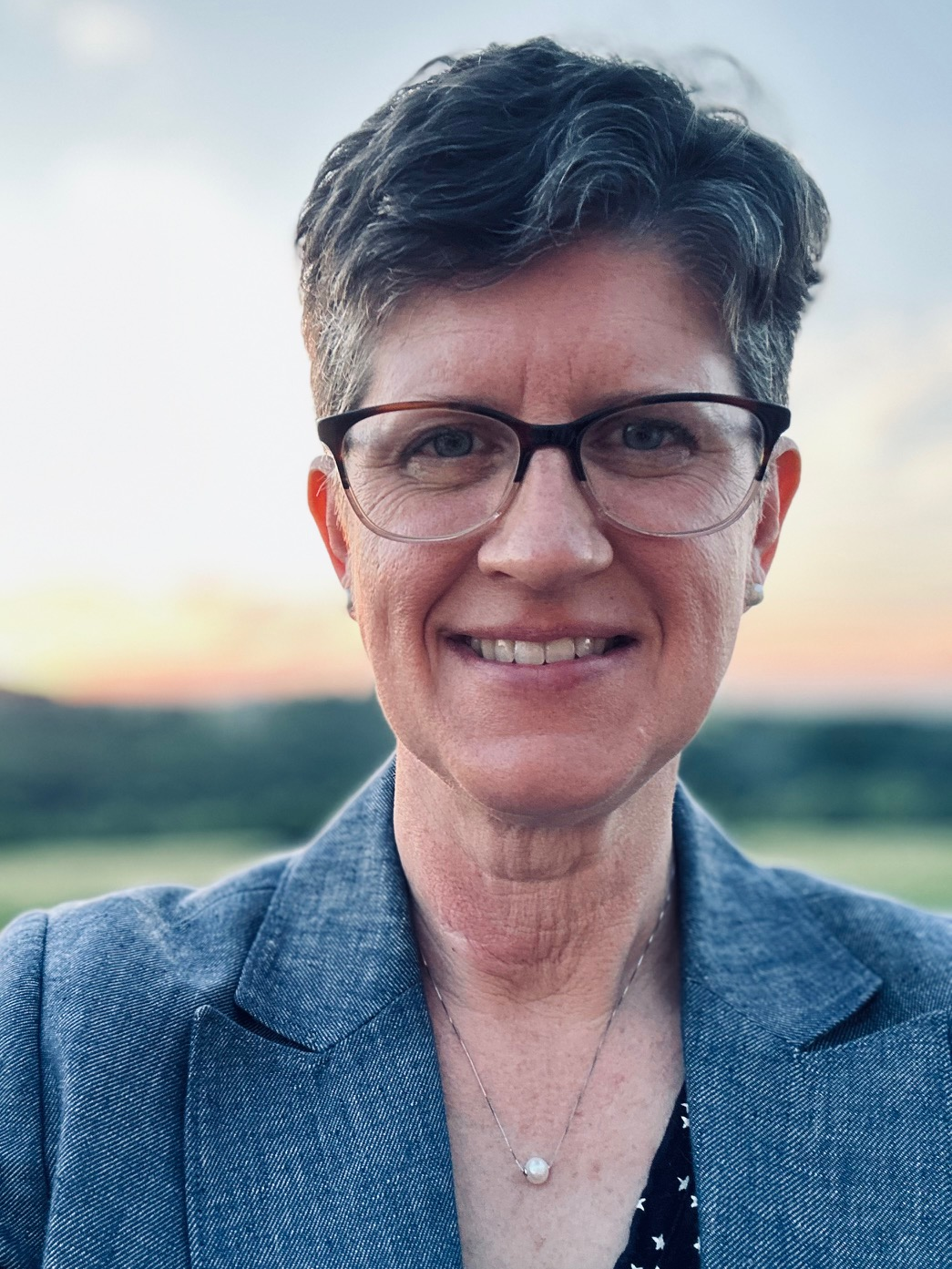
Jill Underly

=== State Senate ===
- SD 3: Tim Carpenter
- SD 4: Dora Drake (Caucus Vice Chair)
- SD 6: La Tonya Johnson
- SD 7: Chris Larson
- SD 8: Jodi Habush Sinykin
- SD 14. Sarah Keyeski
- SD 15: Mark Spreitzer (Caucus Chair)
- SD 16: Melissa Ratcliff
- SD 18: Kristin Alfheim
- SD 22: Robert Wirch
- SD 26: Kelda Roys
- SD 27: Dianne Hesselbein (Minority Leader)
- SD 30: Jamie Wall
- SD 31: Jeff Smith (Assistant Minority Leader)
- SD 32: Brad Pfaff

=== State Assembly ===
- AD 7: Karen Kirsch
- AD 8: Sylvia Ortiz-Velez
- AD 9: Priscilla Prado
- AD 10: Darrin Madison
- AD 11: Sequanna Taylor
- AD 12: Russell Goodwin
- AD 13: Robyn Vining
- AD 14: Angelito Tenorio
- AD 16: Kalan Haywood (Assistant Minority Leader)
- AD 17: Supreme Moore Omokunde
- AD 18: Margaret Arney
- AD 19: Ryan Clancy
- AD 20: Christine Sinicki
- AD 23: Deb Andraca
- AD 26: Joe Sheehan
- AD 40: Karen DeSanto
- AD 42: Maureen McCarville
- AD 43: Brienne Brown
- AD 44: Ann Roe
- AD 45: Clinton Anderson
- AD 46: Joan Fitzgerald
- AD 47: Randy Udell
- AD 48: Andrew Hysell
- AD 50: Jenna Jacobson
- AD 52: Lee Snodgrass
- AD 54: Lori Palmeri
- AD 62: Angelina Cruz
- AD 64: Tip McGuire
- AD 65: Ben DeSmidt
- AD 66: Greta Neubauer (Minority Leader)
- AD 71: Vinnie Miresse
- AD 73: Angela Stroud
- AD 76: Francesca Hong
- AD 77: Renuka Mayadev
- AD 78: Shelia Stubbs
- AD 79: Lisa Subeck (Caucus Chair)
- AD 80: Mike Bare
- AD 81: Alex Joers
- AD 89: Ryan Spaude
- AD 90: Amaad Rivera-Wagner
- AD 91: Jodi Emerson
- AD 93: Christian Phelps
- AD 94: Steve Doyle
- AD 95: Jill Billings (Caucus Vice Chair)
- AD 96: Tara Johnson

=== Mayoral offices ===
- City of Milwaukee: Cavalier Johnson
- City of Madison: Satya Rhodes-Conway
- City of Green Bay: Eric Genrich
- City of Kenosha: David Bogdala
- City of Racine: Cory Mason
- City of La Crosse: Shaundel Washington-Spivey
- City of Manitowoc: Justin Nickels
- City of Superior: Jim Paine
- City of Glendale: Bryan Kennedy

== County parties ==
The Democratic Party of Wisconsin is a membership organization. Members are organized in 71 county Democratic parties in Wisconsin. Ashland and Bayfield counties are organized as the joint Chequamegon Democratic party.

=== List of county parties ===
- Adams County Democratic Party
- Barron County Democratic Party
- Brown County Democratic Party
- Buffalo County Democratic Party
- Burnett County Democratic Party
- Calumet County Democratic Party
- Chequamegon Democratic Party
- Chippewa County Democratic Party
- Democratic Party of Clark County
- Columbia County Democratic Party
- Crawford County Democratic Party
- Democratic Party of Dane County
- Dodge County Democratic Party
- Door County Democratic Party
- Douglas County Democratic Party
- Dunn County Democratic Party
- Eau Claire County Democratic Party
- Florence County Democratic Party
- Fond Du Lac County Democratic Party
- Forest County Democratic Party
- Grant County Democratic Party
- Green County Democratic Party
- Green Lake County Democratic Party
- Iowa County Democratic Party
- Iron County Democratic Party
- Jackson County Democratic Party
- Jefferson County Democratic Party
- Juneau County Democratic Party
- Kenosha County Democratic Party
- Kewaunee County Democratic Party
- La Crosse County Democratic Party
- Lafayette County Democratic Party
- Langlade County Democratic Party
- Lincoln County Democratic Party
- Manitowoc County Democratic Party
- Marathon County Democratic Party
- Marinette County Democratic Party
- Marquette County Democratic Party
- Menominee County Democratic Party
- Milwaukee County Democratic Party
- Monroe County Democratic Party
- Oconto County Democratic Party
- Oneida County Democratic Party
- Outagamie County Democratic Party
- Ozaukee County Democratic Party
- Pepin County Democratic Party
- Pierce County Democratic Party
- Polk County Democratic Party
- Portage County Democratic Party
- Price County Democratic Party
- Racine County Democratic Party
- Richland County Democratic Party
- Rock County Democratic Party
- Rusk County Democratic Party
- Sauk County Democratic Party
- Sawyer County Democratic Party
- Shawano County Democratic Party
- Sheboygan County Democratic Party
- St. Croix County Democratic Party
- Taylor County Democratic Party
- Trempealeau County Democratic Party
- Vernon County Democratic Party
- Vilas County Democratic Party
- Walworth County Democratic Party
- Washburn County Democratic Party
- Washington County Democratic Party
- Waukesha County Democratic Party
- Waupaca County Democratic Party
- Waushara County Democratic Party
- Winnebago County Democratic Party
- Wood County Democratic Party

== Past chairs ==
Chair	Start Year	End Year	Hometown	Notes
Joseph E. Davies	1910	1914	Madison	
Joseph Martin	1914	1916	Green Bay	
Otto A. La Budde	1916	1919	Milwaukee	
John M. Callahan	1925	1927	Milwaukee	Resigned to serve as member of the Democratic National Committee.
Otto A. La Budde	1927	1933	Milwaukee	Resigned in 1933 to accept position as federal internal revenue collector.
Joseph Martin	1933	1934	Green Bay	Resigned in 1934 in order to accept appointment to the Supreme Court of Wisconsin
James A. Corcoran	1935			
Jerome F. Fox	1948	1951	Chilton	Mayor of Chilton (1946–1952), State Representative (1931–1935)
James E. Doyle	1951	1953	Madison	United States district judge for the Western District of Wisconsin (1965–1980)
Elliot Walstead	1953	1955		
Philleo Nash	1955	1957	Wisconsin Rapids	Lieutenant Governor of Wisconsin (1959–1961), Commissioner of the U.S. Bureau of Indian Affairs (1961–1966)
Patrick J. Lucey	1957	1963	Madison	Governor of Wisconsin (1971–1977) and U.S. Ambassador to Mexico (1977–1979)
J. Louis Hanson	1963	1967	Mellen	
Richard D. Cudahy	1967	1968	Milwaukee	Nominee for Attorney General of Wisconsin (1968), Judge of the U.S. Seventh Circuit Court of Appeals (1979–1994)
James W. Wimmer	1968	1971	Madison	
M. William Gerrard	1971	1975	La Crosse	University of Wisconsin Board of Regents
Herb Kohl	1975	1977	Milwaukee	U.S. Senator from Wisconsin (1989–2013)
Michael N. Bleicher	1977	1979	Madison	
Joseph W. Checota	1979	1981	Milwaukee	
Matt Flynn	1981	1985	Milwaukee	retired partner at Quarles & Brady and candidate for Governor of Wisconsin in 2018
Suellen Albrecht	1985	1989	Oregon	
Jeffrey A. Neubauer	1989	1993	Racine	State Representative (1981–1989)
Martha Love	1993	1993	Milwaukee	
Marlys Matuszak	1993	1997	Wausau	
Terri Spring	1997	2001	McFarland	
Linda Honold	2001	2005	Milwaukee	former executive director of Citizen Action Wisconsin
Joe Wineke	2005	2009	Verona	Wisconsin State Senator for the 27th District (1993–1999)
Mike Tate	2009	2015	Milwaukee	former executive director of Fair Wisconsin
Martha Laning	2015	2019	Sheboygan	former nonprofit executive and activist
Ben Wikler	2019	2025	Madison	former senior advisor to MoveOn
Devin Remiker	2025	Current	Reedsburg	current chair, former DPW executive director

== Election results ==
=== Federal ===
==== U.S. House ====
Election	Votes	%	Seats (WI)	±	%
2016	1,379,998	49.76	3 / 8	0	2.95
2018	1,367,497	53.18	3 / 8	0	3.42
2020	1,566,671	48.50	3 / 8	0	4.68
2022	1,012,955	40.10	2 / 8	▼1	8.40
2024	1,603,350	48.21	2 / 8	0	8.11
2026	1,454,885	56.25	4 / 8	▲2	8.04

=== State ===
==== Executive offices ====
Governor
Election	Candidate/ticket	Votes	%	Result
1950	Carl W. Thompson	525,319	46.16%	Lost ✗
1952	William Proxmire	601,844	37.26%	Lost ✗
1954	William Proxmire	560,747	48.40%	Lost ✗
1956	William Proxmire	749,421	48.11%	Lost ✗
1958	Gaylord Nelson	644,296	53.59%	Won ✓
1960	Gaylord Nelson	890,868	51.55%	Won ✓
1962	John W. Reynolds Jr.	637,491	50.36%	Won ✓
1964	John W. Reynolds Jr.	837,901	49.44%	Lost ✗
1966	Patrick Lucey	539,258	46.08%	Lost ✗
1968	Bronson La Follette	791,100	46.82%	Lost ✗
1970	Patrick Lucey/Martin J. Schreiber	728,403	54.24%	Won ✓
1974	Patrick Lucey/Martin J. Schreiber	628,639	53.19%	Won ✓
1978	Martin J. Schreiber/Doug La Follette	673,813	44.89%	Lost ✗
1982	Anthony S. Earl/James T. Flynn	896,872	56.76%	Won ✓
1986	Anthony S. Earl/Sharon Metz	705,578	46.21%	Lost ✗
1990	Thomas A. Loftus/Joseph Czarnezki	576,280	41.77%	Lost ✗
1994	Charles Chvala/Dorothy K. Dean	482,850	30.88%	Lost ✗
1998	Ed Garvey/Barbara Lawton	679,553	38.70%	Lost ✗
2002	Jim Doyle/Barbara Lawton	800,515	45.09%	Won ✓
2006	Jim Doyle/Barbara Lawton	1,139,115	52.70%	Won ✓
2010	Tom Barrett/Tom Nelson	1,004,303	46.48%	Lost ✗
2012 (recall)	Tom Barrett	1,164,480	46.58%	Lost ✗
2014	Mary Burke/John Lehman	1,122,913	46.59%	Lost ✗
2018	Tony Evers/Mandela Barnes	1,324,307	49.54%	Won ✓
2022	Tony Evers/Sara Rodriguez	1,358,774	51.15%	Won ✓
2026	David Crowley/Sarah Godlewski	1,440,993	54.00%	Won ✓

== See also ==
- Republican Party of Wisconsin
- Politics of Wisconsin
- Political party strength in Wisconsin
- History of the United States Democratic Party
