= Wisconsin's 65th Assembly district =

American legislative district for Kenosha, Wisconsin

Wisconsin's 65th State Assembly district
- 2024 map defined in 2023 Wisc. Act 94; 2022 map defined in Johnson v. Wisconsin Elections Commission; 2011 map was defined in 2011 Wisc. Act 43
Assemblymember
Ben DeSmidt; D–Kenosha
since January 6, 2025 (1 years)
- Demographics: 71.87% White; 9.68% Black; 14.59% Hispanic; 1.92% Asian; 2.38% Native American; 0.13% Hawaiian/Pacific Islander
- Population (2020) • Voting age: 60,095; 46,462
- Website: Official website
- Notes: Kenosha, Wisconsin

The 65th Assembly district of Wisconsin is one of 99 districts in the Wisconsin State Assembly. Located in southeast Wisconsin, the district comprises part of southeast Kenosha County, including the southern half of the city of Kenosha and the northern half of the village of Pleasant Prairie. The district also contains downtown Kenosha, Kenosha Harbor, and landmarks such as Civic Center Historic District and Library Park. The district is represented by Democrat Ben DeSmidt, since January 2025.

The 65th Assembly district is located within Wisconsin's 22nd Senate district, along with the 64th and 66th Assembly districts.

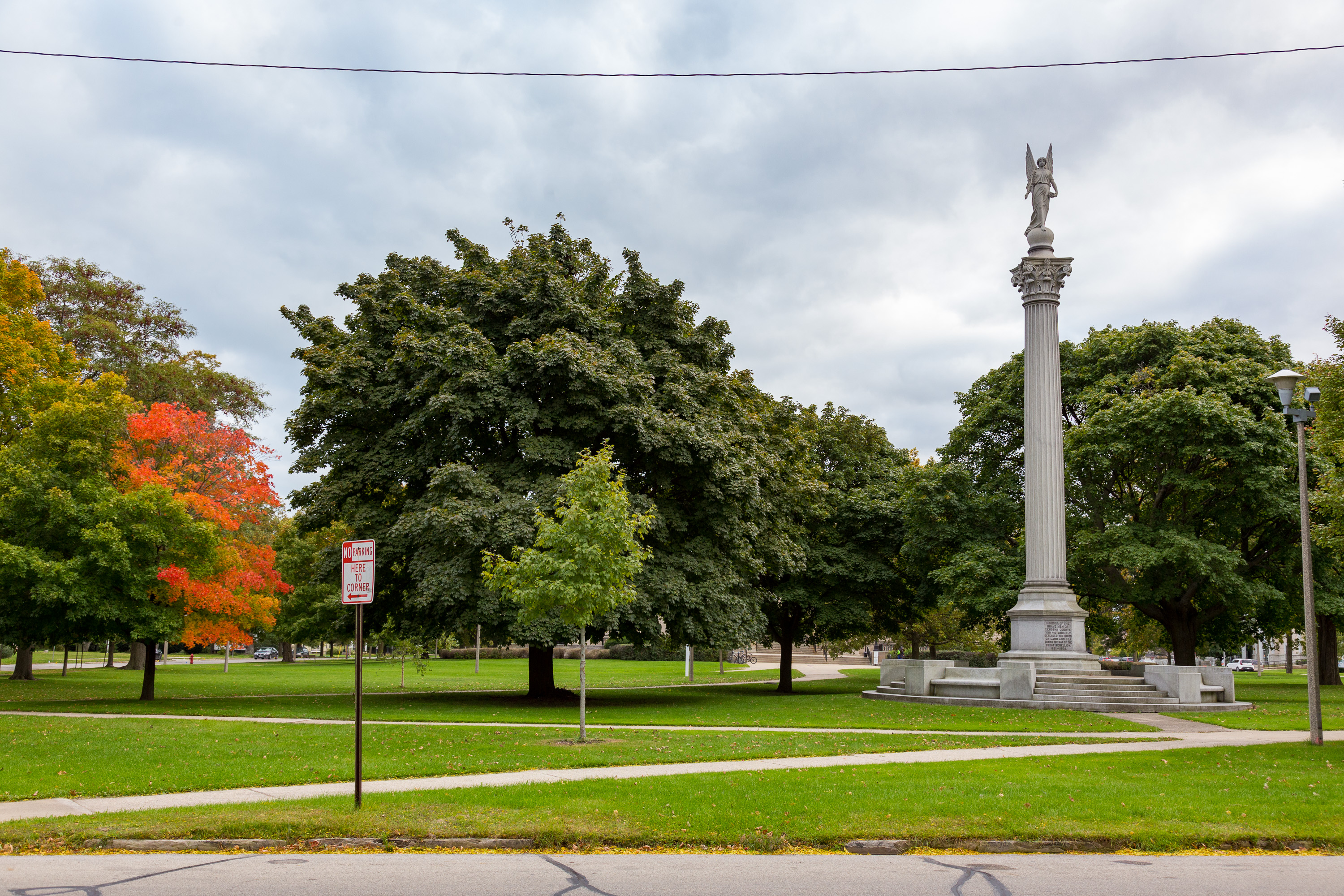
Soldiers' Monument in Library Park

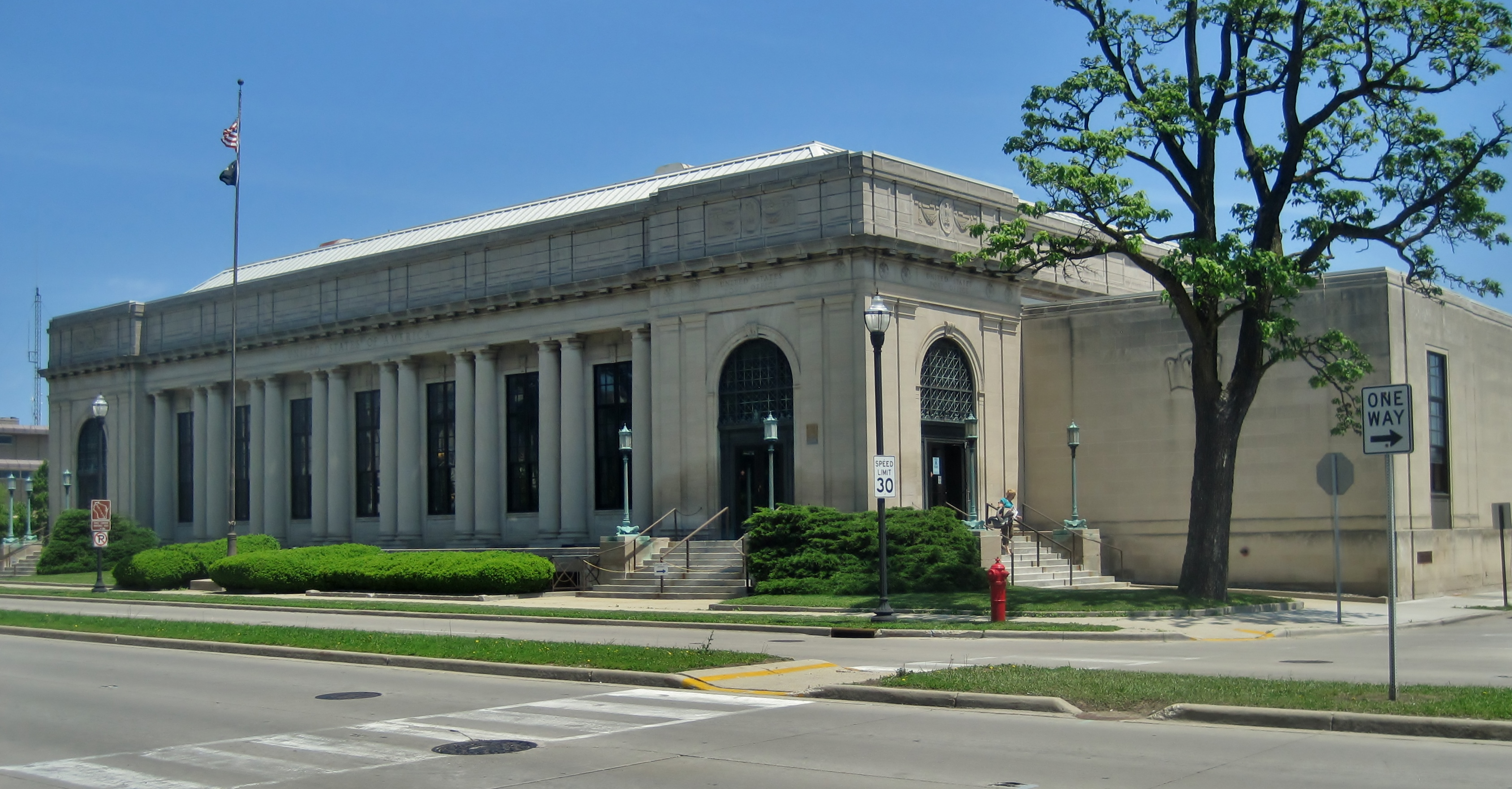
Civic Center Historic District

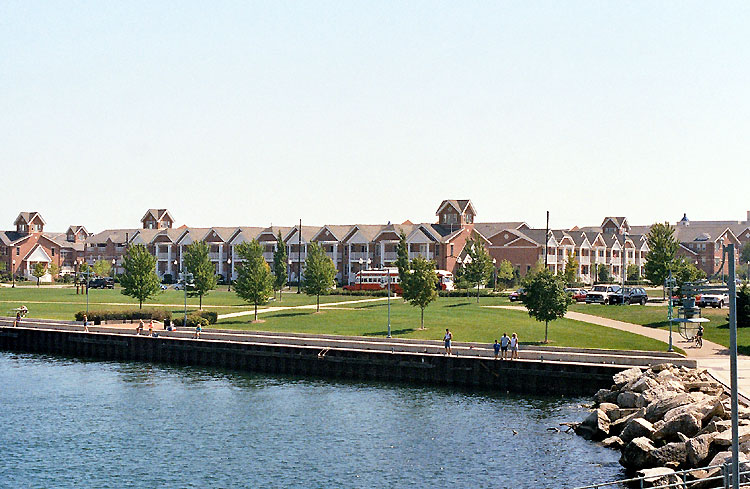
Harbor Park

== List of past representatives ==
List of representatives to the Wisconsin State Assembly from the 65th district
Member	Party	Residence	Counties represented	Term start	Term end	Ref.
District created
Eugene Dorff	Dem.	Kenosha	Kenosha	January 1, 1973	January 3, 1983	
Joanne Huelsman	Rep.	Waukesha	Waukesha	January 3, 1983	January 7, 1985	
John Antaramian	Dem.	Kenosha	Kenosha	January 7, 1985	January 4, 1993	
Robert Wirch	Dem.	Kenosha	Kenosha	January 4, 1993	January 6, 1997	
John Steinbrink	Dem.	Kenosha	Kenosha	January 6, 1997	January 7, 2013	
Tod Ohnstad	Dem.	Kenosha	Kenosha	January 7, 2013	January 6, 2025	
Ben DeSmidt	Dem.	Kenosha	Kenosha	January 6, 2025	Current	

== Electoral history ==
Year	Date	Elected				Defeated				Total	Plurality	Other primary candidates
2012	Nov. 6	Tod Ohnstad	Democratic	18,373	97.99%	--unopposed--				18,750		Dayvin M. A. Hallmon (Dem.); Albert Namath (Dem.)
2014	Nov. 4	Tod Ohnstad (inc)	Democratic	11,599	96.93%	--unopposed--				11,966		
2016	Nov. 8	Tod Ohnstad (inc)	Democratic	16,112	97.84%	--unopposed--				16,467		
2018	Nov. 6	Tod Ohnstad (inc)	Democratic	14,456	96.82%	--unopposed--				14,931		
2020	Nov. 3	Tod Ohnstad (inc)	Democratic	14,356	60.25%	Crystal J. Miller	Rep.	9,444	39.63%	23,829	4,912	
2022	Nov. 8	Tod Ohnstad (inc)	Democratic	11,035	61.78%	Frank Petrick	Rep.	6,803	38.08%	17,863	4,232	
2024	Nov. 5	Ben DeSmidt	Democratic	15,065	53.27%	Brian Gonzales	Rep.	13,166	46.55%	28,283	1,899	Kyle Flood (Dem.)
