= Tod Ohnstad =

American politician (born 1952)

Member of the Wisconsin State Assembly from the 65th district
- In office January 7, 2013 – January 6, 2025
- Preceded by: John Steinbrink
- Succeeded by: Ben DeSmidt

Member of the Kenosha City Council
- In office 2008–2014

Personal details
- Born: May 21, 1952 (age 74) Eau Claire, Wisconsin, U.S.
- Party: Democratic
- Spouse: Kristi
- Occupation: Machinist, politician
- Website: Official website

Tod Ohnstad (born May 21, 1952) is an American Democratic politician, retired machinist, and former union representative from Kenosha, Wisconsin. He served six terms as a member of the Wisconsin State Assembly, representing the Wisconsin's 65th Assembly district from 2013 to 2025.

== Biography ==
Ohnstad was born in Eau Claire, Wisconsin, and graduated from Altoona High School in 1970. He moved to Kenosha and attended the University of Wisconsin–Parkside. He worked at Kenosha Engine, first when it was operated by American Motors Corporation, then later for General Motors, and Chrysler. During his work in the auto industry, he was heavily involved with the UAW Local 72 labor union. He was a member of the executive board of the United Auto Workers from 1984 to 2004.

Ohnstad served on the Kenosha Common Council from 2008 until 2014. In August 2012, Ohnstad won the 65th District Democratic primary for Wisconsin State Assembly and did not face an opponent in the November general election. He did not face an opponent in the general election until 2020, when he defeated Republican nominee Crystal Miller.

On March 2, 2024, Ohnstad announced he would not run for re-election in 2024 and would retire at the end of his 6th term.

== Electoral history ==
=== Wisconsin Assembly (2012–2022) ===
Year	Election	Date	Elected				Defeated				Total	Plurality
2012	Primary	Aug. 14	Tod Ohnstad	Democratic	2,083	73.27%	Dayvin M. A. Hallmon	Dem.	519	18.26%	2,843	1,564
2012	Primary	Aug. 14	Tod Ohnstad	Democratic	2,083	73.27%	Albert Namath	Dem.	180	6.33%	2,843	1,564
2012	General	Nov. 6	Tod Ohnstad	Democratic	18,373	97.99%	--unopposed--				18,750	
2014	General	Nov. 4	Tod Ohnstad (inc)	Democratic	11,599	96.93%	--unopposed--				11,966	
2016	General	Nov. 8	Tod Ohnstad (inc)	Democratic	16,112	97.84%	--unopposed--				16,467	
2018	General	Nov. 6	Tod Ohnstad (inc)	Democratic	14,456	96.82%	--unopposed--				14,931	
2020	General	Nov. 3	Tod Ohnstad (inc)	Democratic	14,356	60.25%	Crystal J. Miller	Rep.	9,444	39.63%	23,829	4,912
2022	General	Nov. 8	Tod Ohnstad (inc)	Democratic	11,035	61.78%	Frank Petrick	Rep.	6,803	38.08%	17,863	4,232

Wisconsin State Assembly
Preceded by John Steinbrink	Member of the Wisconsin State Assembly from the 65th district January 7, 2013 – January 6, 2025	Succeeded by Ben DeSmidt
