= Robert Wirch =

American politician (born 1943)

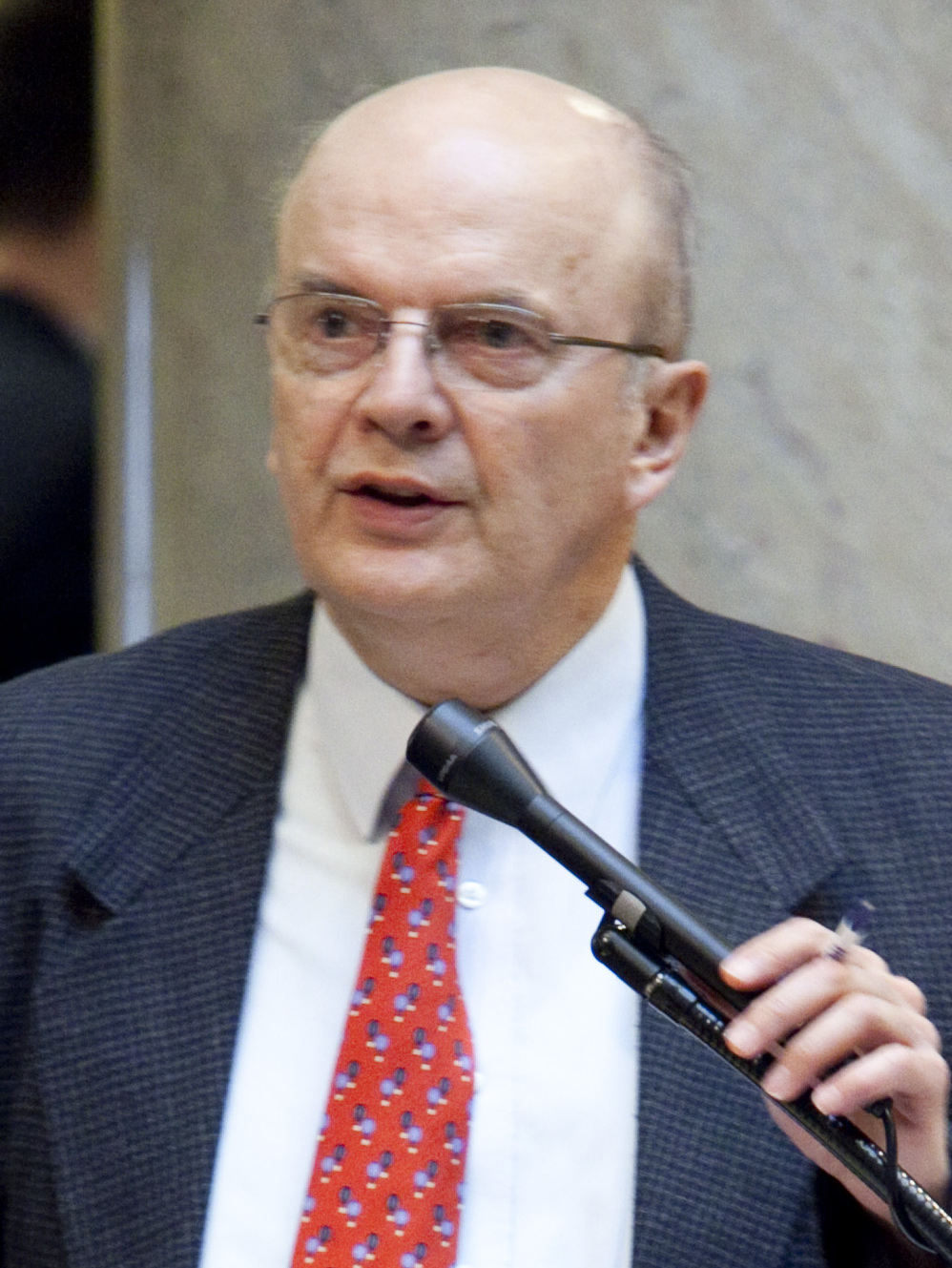
- Wirch in 2009

Member of the Wisconsin Senate from the 22nd district
- Incumbent
- Assumed office January 6, 1997
- Preceded by: Joseph F. Andrea

Member of the Wisconsin State Assembly from the 65th district
- In office January 4, 1993 – January 6, 1997
- Preceded by: John Antaramian
- Succeeded by: John Steinbrink

Member of the Kenosha County Board of Supervisors
- In office 1986–1994

Personal details
- Born: November 16, 1943 (age 82) Kenosha, Wisconsin, U.S.
- Party: Democratic
- Spouse: Mary Wirch (m. 1973; died 2020)
- Children: David, Julia
- Education: University of Wisconsin–Parkside (BA)
- Profession: Factory worker

Military service
- Allegiance: United States
- Branch/service: United States Army; U.S. Army Reserve
- Years of service: 1965–1971

Robert W. Wirch (born November 16, 1943) is an American Democratic politician from Kenosha County, Wisconsin. He is a member of the Wisconsin Senate, representing Wisconsin's 22nd Senate district since 1997. He previously served two terms in the Wisconsin State Assembly, from 1993 to 1997, and served on the Kenosha County Board of Supervisors before that.

== Early life and education ==
Wirch was born in Kenosha, Wisconsin, and has lived his entire life in the Kenosha area. He graduated from Mary D. Bradford High School and went to work at the American Brass Company plant in Kenosha, following in the steps of his father and grandfather. While working at the plant, Wirch also enlisted in the United States Army Reserve, serving from 1965 to 1971. He attended night courses at the University of Wisconsin–Parkside and obtained his bachelor's degree in 1970.

== Early political career ==
While working at American Brass, Wirch was a union employee and became a member of the United Steelworkers Local 9322. He rose within the union, eventually become president of the local and a member of the Wisconsin AFL-CIO executive board. His work in the union led him into politics, as he worked with the growing number of dislocated workers from de-industrialization in southeast Wisconsin. Wirch's own employer, American Brass, was shedding jobs through a series of ownership changes.

In 1985, Wirch announced his first run for public office, running for a seat on the Kenosha County board of supervisors. He won that election, in April 1986, and served eight years on the county board. He became chairman of the county board's health and human services committee; one of his major initiatives in that capacity was the establishment of the Shalom Center shelter and food pantry.

In 1992, incumbent state representative John Antaramian was elected mayor of Kenosha and announced he would not run for re-election to the Assembly later that year. Wirch declared his candidacy to succeed Antaramian in the Wisconsin State Assembly. He faced Kenosha city councilmembers Wanda Lynn Bellow and Stephen Casey in the September 1992 Democratic Party primary election. Wirch prevailed with 45% of the vote and went on to win 74% of the general election vote in the heavily Democratic district. He won re-election in 1994 with 70% of the vote.

== Wisconsin Senate ==
In 1996, state senator Joseph F. Andrea announced he would retire after 20 years in the legislature. Two days later, Andrea stood with Wirch as he announced his campaign to succeed Andrea in the Wisconsin Senate. Also attending and endorsing Wirch were state representative James Kreuser, mayor John Antaramian, and sheriff Allan Kehl. With such unified support from Kenosha County Democrats, Wirch faced no opponent in the primary. Wirch faced Kenosha lawyer Bruno Rizzo in the general election, prevailing with 56% of the vote.

Wirch's district, the 22nd Senate district, was considered one of the more competitive seats in the Senate under the legislative district plans prior to 2010, comprising most of Kenosha County. Wirch faced an opponent in every election; his closest race was in 2004, when he won just 52% of the vote against Reince Priebus, who would later become chairman of the Republican National Committee and White House chief of staff.

=== 2011 Act 10 and recall ===
After the 2010 election, Republicans gained full control of state government. One of the first legislative initiatives of the new governor, Scott Walker, was the so-called "Budget Repair Bill", which stripped state employee unions of their collective bargaining rights. This immediately resulted in mass protests at the Wisconsin State Capitol, which continued for months. With Democrats unable to slow down consideration of the bill, Wirch fled the state along with 13 other Democratic senators, in order to deny a quorum.

Republicans were eventually able to circumvent the quorum requirement by stripping out budgetary items from the bill. After the bill became law, Democrats attempted to capitalize on the outrage caused by the passage of the anti-union legislation and shifted to a recall campaign over the next year. Republicans countered by attempting to recall several Democrats who had fled the state, and Wirch was one of the senators targeted.

On February 24, 2011, Taxpayers to Recall Robert Wirch officially registered with the Wisconsin Government Accountability Board. On April 21, they filed 18,300 signatures with Wisconsin's Government Accountability Board, far surpassing the 13,537 signatures needed to trigger a recall election. Wirch's recall election was set for August 16, 2011; Wirch faced Kenosha attorney Jonathan Steitz and prevailed with 57% of the vote.

=== Senate minority ===
Another effect of the new Republican government was a dramatic legislative gerrymander, passed in August 2011, just before the recall elections. Under the new map, Wirch's district was significantly altered. Rural Kenosha County was removed from the district and replaced with the city of Racine, in Racine County; the changes packed most of the Democratic votes of Racine and Kenosha counties into Wirch's district and converted the neighboring 21st Senate district into a safely Republican seat. The new plan also drew Wirch out of the district, removing all of Pleasant Prairie, where his home is located. Wirch chose to purchase an apartment in Somers in order to maintain residency in the district and run for re-election. In his new district, Wirch won an easy re-election in 2012 with 70% of the vote and did not face an opponent in 2016 or 2020.

After the 2012 elections, Wirch obtained a coveted seat on the powerful budget-writing Joint Finance Committee. State political observers speculated that he received the seat in exchange for his vote for Chris Larson as minority leader.

In 2017, Wirch was the only Democrat in the state Senate who voted in favor of the three billion dollar tax incentive package for the Foxconn in Wisconsin project. In explaining his vote, Wirch referred back to his own history as a third generation factory worker, watching those jobs shipped overseas, saying, "It's not a great deal, but it's the only deal on the table." After the 2024 redistricting, the Foxconn in Wisconsin industrial park is now within the boundaries of Wirch's district.

== Personal life ==
Wirch resides in Pleasant Prairie, Wisconsin. Mary, his wife of 47 years, died on February 23, 2020, from complications related to gall bladder cancer. They have two adult children, David and Julia.

Wirch is a member of the Danish Brotherhood in America, the Polish Legion of American Veterans, and was previously a member of the board of directors of the Kenosha Boys & Girls Club.

== Electoral history ==
=== Wisconsin Assembly (1992, 1994) ===
Year	Election	Date	Elected				Defeated				Total	Plurality
1992	Primary	Sep. 8	Robert W. Wirch	Democratic	3,229	45.52%	Wanda Lynn Bellow	Dem.	2,085	29.39%	7,094	1,144
1992	Primary	Sep. 8	Robert W. Wirch	Democratic	3,229	45.52%	Stephen P. Casey	Dem.	1,780	25.09%	7,094	1,144
1992	General	Nov. 3	Robert W. Wirch	Democratic	15,144	74.13%	Darnell H. Mason	Rep.	5,286	25.87%	20,430	9,858
1994	General	Nov. 8	Robert W. Wirch (inc)	Democratic	10,722	69.34%	Walter E. Velden	Rep.	4,741	30.66%	15,463	5,981

=== Wisconsin Senate (1996–present) ===
Year	Election	Date	Elected				Defeated				Total	Plurality
1996	General	Nov. 5	Robert W. Wirch	Democratic	33,847	56.81%	Bruno M. Rizzo	Rep.	25,728	43.19%	59,575	8,119
2000	General	Nov. 7	Robert W. Wirch (inc)	Democratic	39,321	55.98%	Dave Duecker	Rep.	30,897	43.99%	70,244	8,424
2004	General	Nov. 2	Robert W. Wirch (inc)	Democratic	42,097	52.11%	Reince Priebus	Rep.	38,644	47.84%	80,779	3,453
2008	General	Nov. 4	Robert W. Wirch (inc)	Democratic	54,946	66.65%	Benjamin Lee Bakke	Rep.	27,383	33.21%	82,444	27,563
2011	Recall	Aug. 16	Robert W. Wirch (inc)	Democratic	26,524	57.35%	Jonathan Steitz	Rep.	19,662	42.51%	82,444	27,563
2011	Recall	Aug. 16	Robert W. Wirch (inc)	Democratic	26,524	57.35%	Brian Harwood (write-in)	Ind.	23	0.05%	82,444	27,563
2012	General	Nov. 6	Robert W. Wirch (inc)	Democratic	51,177	69.57%	Pam Stevens	Rep.	22,278	30.29%	73,559	28,899
2016	General	Nov. 8	Robert W. Wirch (inc)	Democratic	50,841	98.16%	--unopposed--				51,794	49,888
2020	General	Nov. 3	Robert W. Wirch (inc)	Democratic	55,214	96.22%	--unopposed--				57,385	53,043
2024	General	Nov. 5	Robert W. Wirch (inc)	Democratic	62,270	95.29%	--unopposed--				65,347	59,193

Wisconsin State Assembly
Preceded by John Antaramian	Member of the Wisconsin State Assembly from 65th district January 4, 1993 – January 6, 1997	Succeeded by John Steinbrink
Wisconsin Senate
Preceded by Joseph F. Andrea	Member of the Wisconsin Senate from the 22nd district January 6, 1997 – present	Incumbent
