= Ben DeSmidt =

21st century American politician

Member of the Wisconsin State Assembly from the 65th district
- Incumbent
- Assumed office January 6, 2025
- Preceded by: Tod Ohnstad

Personal details
- Born: August 4, 1973 (age 52) Madison, Wisconsin, U.S.
- Party: Democratic
- Education: University of Chicago (B.A.); Columbia University (M.A., M.Phil., Ph.D.)
- Profession: Educator, business owner
- Website: Campaign website

David Benjamin "Ben" DeSmidt is an American educator, small business owner, and Democratic politician from Kenosha, Wisconsin. He is a member of the Wisconsin State Assembly, representing Wisconsin's 65th Assembly district since 2025.

== Biography ==
Born in Wisconsin, DeSmidt earned his bachelor's degree from the University of Chicago, and obtained his M.A., M.Phil., and Ph.D. from Columbia University in New York.

Ben DeSmidt is associate professor emeritus of classics and great ideas at Carthage College, and has been a trustee of Gateway Technical College since 2022. He is also the owner of two bars in Kenosha, Wisconsin, Union Park Tavern and Pavle's Lounge.

After Kenosha's south side state representative Tod Ohnstad announced he would not run for re-election in 2024, DeSmidt entered the race and received Ohnstad's endorsement. He faced a primary against former Kenosha Unified School District board member Kyle Flood, but won the Democratic nomination with nearly 70% of the primary vote. He went on to win the general election, receiving about 53% of the vote against Republican Brian Gonzales, a former Kenosha police officer.

== Electoral history ==
=== Wisconsin Assembly (2024) ===
| Year | Election | Date | Elected | | | | Defeated | | | | Total | Plurality |
|---|---|---|---|---|---|---|---|---|---|---|---|---|
| 2024 | Primary | Aug. 13 | Ben DeSmidt | Democratic | 3,738 | 69.51% | Kyle Flood | Dem. | 1,637 | 30.44% | 5,378 | 2,101 |
| 2024 | General | Nov. 5 | Ben DeSmidt | Democratic | 15,065 | 53.27% | Brian Gonzales | Rep. | 13,166 | 46.55% | 28,283 | 1,899 |

Wisconsin State Assembly
| Preceded by Tod Ohnstad | Member of the Wisconsin State Assembly from the 65th district January 6, 2025 – present | Incumbent |
