= Dan W. Brock =

American philosopher

- Born: December 1937
- Died: September 26, 2020 (aged 82); Boston, Massachusetts, U.S.
- Awards: Lifetime Achievement Award of American Society for Bioethics and Humanities, October 18, 2018

Education
- Education: Cornell University (BA); Columbia University (PhD)

Philosophical work
- Era: 20th-21st century
- Region: New England
- Institutions: Harvard Medical School
- Main interests: Philosophy, bioethics

Dan W. Brock (December 1937 – September 26, 2020) was an American philosopher, bioethicist, and professor emeritus at Harvard University and Brown University. He was the Frances Glessner Lee Professor Emeritus of Medical Ethics in the Department of Global Health and Social Medicine at Harvard Medical School, the former Director of the Division of Medical Ethics (now the Center for Bioethics) at the Harvard Medical School, and former Director of the Harvard University Program in Ethics and Health (PEH).

== Education and career ==
Brock earned his B.A. in economics from Cornell University and his Ph.D. in philosophy from Columbia University. He taught philosophy for many years at Brown University, where he held the Tillinghast Professorship. He also served as a member of the Department of Clinical Bioethics at the National Institutes of Health.

He was president of the American Association of Bioethics (AAB) in 1995–96, and was a founding board member of the American Society for Bioethics and Humanities. He was a Fellow of the Hastings Center, a bioethics research institution, served as a board member and received the Henry Knowles Beecher Award for lifetime achievement in bioethics from them.

Brock retired as a professor in 2014, but remained an editorial board member of 12 professional journals in ethics, bioethics and health policy, and lectured widely at national and international conferences, professional societies, universities, and health care institutions. Most recently he served on a panel that updated 20-year-old guidelines and recommendations for evaluating cost-effectiveness in health and medicine, published in the Journal of the American Medical Association, September 13, 2016.

The American Society for Bioethics and Humanities, a bioethics research institution of which he was a founding board member conferred upon Dan Brock their Lifetime Achievement Award on October 19, 2018, in Anaheim CA, during their 20th Annual Meeting (October 18–21, 2018), when their theme was "The Future is Now: Bioethics and Humanities Re-Imagine an Uncertain World".

== Philosophical work ==
Dan Brock published over 150 articles and co-authored 6 books relating to bioethics and philosophy and served on numerous editorial boards. He worked with various international organizations on bioethics as a consultant including the World Health Organization and presented papers and talks all over the world.

== See also ==
- American Society for Bioethics and Humanities
- American philosophy
- Health equity
- List of American philosophers
