= 89th Wisconsin Legislature =

Wisconsin legislative term for 1989–1990

←	88th	90th	→
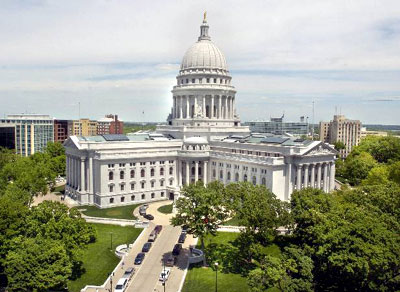
- Wisconsin State Capitol

Overview
- Legislative body: Wisconsin Legislature
- Meeting place: Wisconsin State Capitol
- Term: January 2, 1989 – January 7, 1991
- Election: November 8, 1988

Senate
- Members: 33
- Senate President: Fred Risser (D)
- Party control: Democratic

Assembly
- Members: 99
- Assembly Speaker: Thomas A. Loftus (D)
- Speaker pro tempore: David Clarenbach (D)
- Party control: Democratic

Sessions
- Regular: January 3, 1989 – January 7, 1991

Special sessions
- Oct. 1989 Spec.: October 10, 1989 – March 22, 1990
- May 1990 Spec.: May 15, 1990 – May 15, 1990

The Eighty-Ninth Wisconsin Legislature convened from January 3, 1989, to January 7, 1991, in regular session, and also convened in two special sessions.

Senators representing even-numbered districts were newly elected for this session and were serving the first two years of a four-year term. Assembly members were elected to a two-year term. Assembly members and even-numbered senators were elected in the general election of November 8, 1988. Senators representing odd-numbered districts were serving the third and fourth year of a four-year term, having been elected in the general election of November 4, 1986.

The governor of Wisconsin during this entire term was Republican Tommy Thompson, of Juneau County, serving the second two years of a four-year term, having won election in the 1986 Wisconsin gubernatorial election.

== Major events ==
- January 20, 1989: Inauguration of George H. W. Bush as the 41st President of the United States.
- April 4, 1989: 1989 Wisconsin Spring election:
  - Wisconsin voters rejected an amendment to the state constitution which would have allowed the state legislature to enact progressive tax relief for state property and sales taxes.
- June 3, 1989: Forces of China's People's Liberation Army began a crackdown on the Tiananmen Square protests, ultimately resulting in many deaths.
- November 9, 1989: After an unexpected announcement of liberalization of travel policy in East Germany, crowds of civilians began demolishing the Berlin Wall, which had divided the city since the 1960s.
- February 7, 1990: The Central Committee of the Communist Party of the Soviet Union agreed to allow parties other than the Communist Party of the Soviet Union to compete in elections in the constituent republics of the Soviet Union.
- April 3, 1990: 1990 Wisconsin Spring election:
  - Wisconsin voters ratified an amendment to the state constitution which revised the gubernatorial line-item veto power to prevent the governor from creating entire new words from vetoing parts of other words.
- August 7, 1990: U.S. President George H. W. Bush ordered American military forces to Saudi Arabia following Iraq's invasion of Kuwait.
- November 6, 1990: 1990 United States general election:
  - Tommy Thompson (R) re-elected Governor of Wisconsin.
- November 29, 1990: The United Nations Security Council adopted Resolution 678, ordering Iraq to withdraw forces from Kuwait by January 15, 1991, and empowering states to use all necessary means to force Iraq to comply with the resolution.

== Major legislation ==
- August 8, 1989: An Act relating to state finances and appropriations, constituting the general executive budget bill of the 1989 legislature, and making appropriations, 1989 Act 31. Vetoed in part, this act also established the Wisconsin Department of Corrections.

== Party summary ==
=== Senate summary ===
Senate partisan composition Democratic: 20 seats Republican: 13 seats

	Party (Shading indicates majority caucus)		Total	
	Dem.	Rep.	Total	Vacant
End of previous Legislature	19	14	33	0
Start of Reg. Session	20	13	33	0
From Apr. 20, 1989 (Note: Republican Susan Engeleiter (33rd District) resigned after her confirmation as Administrator of the Small Business Administration.)	20	12	32	1
From Jul. 11, 1989 (Note: Republican Margaret Farrow (33rd District) was sworn in to replace Susan Engeleiter.)	20	13	33	0
From Sep. 1, 1989 (Note: Democrat Mordecai Lee (5th District) resigned.)	19	13	32	1
From Oct. 2, 1989 (Note: Democrat Richard Shoemaker (10th District) resigned after he was convicted of several misdemeanors.)	18	13	31	2
From Dec. 13, 1989 (Note: Democrat Tom Barrett (5th District) and Republican William Berndt (10th District) were sworn in to replace Mordecai Lee and Richard Shoemaker, respectively.)	19	14	33	0
From Jul. 12, 1990 (Note: Democrat Lloyd H. Kincaid (12th District) resigned.)	18	14	32	1
From Aug. 1, 1990 (Note: Republican J. Mac Davis (11th District) resigned after being elected a Wisconsin circuit court judge.)	18	13	31	2
From Nov. 28, 1990 (Note: Democrat Roger Breske (12th District) was sworn in to replace Lloyd H. Kincaid.)	19	13	32	1
Final voting share	59.38%	40.63%		
Beginning of the next Legislature	19	14	33	0

=== Assembly summary ===
Assembly partisan composition Democratic: 56 seats Republican: 43 seats

	Party (Shading indicates majority caucus)		Total	
	Dem.	Rep.	Total	Vacant
End of previous Legislature	54	44	98	1
Start of Reg. Session	56	43	99	0
From Jul. 11, 1989 (Note: Republican Margaret Farrow (99th District) resigned after her election to the state senate.)	56	42	98	1
From Jul. 31, 1989 (Note: Democrat Louise M. Tesmer (19th District) resigned after being elected a Wisconsin circuit court judge.)	55	42	97	2
From Sep. 22, 1989 (Note: Republican Frank Urban (99th District) was sworn in to replace Margaret Farrow.)	55	43	98	1
From Oct. 26, 1989 (Note: Democrat Rosemary Potter (19th District) was sworn in to replace Louise M. Tesmer.)	56	43	99	0
From Dec. 13, 1989 (Note: Democrat Tom Barrett (14th District) resigned after his election to the state senate.)	55	43	98	1
From Jan. 12, 1990 (Note: Republican Betty Jo Nelsen (10th District) resigned after being confirmed as administrator of the Food and Nutrition Service.)	55	42	97	2
From May 15, 1990 (Note: Republican Alberta Darling (10th District) and Democrat David Cullen (14th District) were sworn in to replace Betty Jo Nelsen and Tom Barrett, respectively.)	56	43	99	0
From May 28, 1990 (Note: Republican Joseph E. Tregoning (51st District) resigned to accept a state job.)	56	42	98	1
From Jul. 1, 1990 (Note: Democrat Scott C. Fergus (61st District) resigned.)	55	42	97	2
Final voting share	56.7%	43.3%		
Beginning of the next Legislature	58	41	99	0

== Sessions ==
- Regular session: January 3, 1989 – January 7, 1991
- October 1989 special session: October 10, 1989 – March 22, 1990
- May 1990 special session: May 15, 1990

== Leaders ==
=== Senate leadership ===
- President of the Senate: Fred Risser (D–Madison)

==== Senate majority leadership ====
- Majority Leader: Joseph A. Strohl (D–Racine)
- Assistant Majority Leader: David Helbach (D–Stevens Point)

==== Senate minority leadership ====
- Minority Leader: Michael G. Ellis (R–Neenah)
- Assistant Minority Leader: Brian Rude (R–Coon Valley)

=== Assembly leadership ===
- Speaker of the Assembly: Thomas A. Loftus (D–Sun Prairie)
- Speaker pro tempore: David Clarenbach (D–Madison)

==== Assembly majority leadership ====
- Majority Leader: Thomas A. Hauke (D–West Allis)
- Assistant Majority Leader: Marlin Schneider (D–Wisconsin Rapids)

==== Assembly minority leadership ====
- Minority Leader: David Prosser Jr. (R–Appleton)
- Assistant Minority Leader: Randall J. Radtke (R–Lake Mills)

== Members ==
=== Members of the Senate ===
Members of the Senate for the Eighty-Ninth Wisconsin Legislature:

Senate partisan representation Democratic: 20 seats Republican: 13 seats

Dist.	Senator	Party	Age (1989)	Home	First elected
01	Alan Lasee	Rep.	51	Rockland, Brown County	1977
02	Robert Cowles	Rep.	38	Green Bay, Brown County	1987
03	Brian Burke	Dem.	30	Milwaukee, Milwaukee County	1988
04	Barbara Ulichny	Dem.	41	Milwaukee, Milwaukee County	1984
05	Mordecai Lee (res. Sep. 1, 1989)	Dem.	40	Milwaukee, Milwaukee County	1982
05	Tom Barrett (from Dec. 13, 1989)	Dem.	36	Milwaukee, Milwaukee County	1989
06	Gary George	Dem.	34	Milwaukee, Milwaukee County	1980
07	John Plewa	Dem.	43	Milwaukee, Milwaukee County	1984
08	Joseph Czarnezki	Dem.	34	Milwaukee, Milwaukee County	1983
09	William Te Winkle	Dem.	34	Sheboygan, Sheboygan County	1986
10	Richard Shoemaker (res. Oct. 2, 1989)	Dem.	37	Menomonie, Dunn County	1988
10	William Berndt (from Dec. 13, 1989)	Rep.	33	Clifton, Pierce County	1989
11	J. Mac Davis (res. Aug. 1, 1990)	Rep.	36	Waukesha, Waukesha County	1976
11	--Vacant from Aug. 1, 1990--				
12	Lloyd H. Kincaid (res. Jul. 12, 1990)	Dem.	63	Crandon, Forest County	1983
12	Roger Breske (from Nov. 28, 1990)	Dem.	52	Elderon, Marathon County	1990
13	Barbara Lorman	Rep.	56	Fort Atkinson, Jefferson County	1980
14	Joseph Leean	Rep.	46	Dayton, Waupaca County	1984
15	Timothy Weeden	Rep.	37	Beloit, Rock County	1987
16	Charles Chvala	Dem.	34	Madison, Dane County	1984
17	Richard Kreul	Rep.	64	Fennimore, Grant County	1978
18	Carol Buettner	Rep.	40	Oshkosh, Winnebago County	1987
19	Michael G. Ellis	Rep.	47	Neenah, Winnebago County	1982
20	Donald K. Stitt	Rep.	44	Port Washington, Ozaukee County	1984
21	Joseph A. Strohl	Dem.	42	Racine, Racine County	1978
22	Joseph F. Andrea	Dem.	61	Kenosha, Kenosha County	1984
23	Marvin J. Roshell	Dem.	56	Lafayette, Chippewa County	1978
24	David Helbach	Dem.	40	Stevens Point, Portage County	1983
25	Robert Jauch	Dem.	43	Poplar, Douglas County	1986
26	Fred Risser	Dem.	61	Madison, Dane County	1962
27	Russ Feingold	Dem.	35	Middleton, Dane County	1982
28	Lynn Adelman	Dem.	49	New Berlin, Waukesha County	1976
29	Walter Chilsen	Rep.	65	Wausau, Marathon County	1966
30	Jerome Van Sistine	Dem.	62	Green Bay, Brown County	1976
31	Rodney C. Moen	Dem.	51	Whitehall, Trempealeau County	1982
32	Brian Rude	Rep.	33	Coon Valley, Vernon County	1984
33	Susan Engeleiter (res. Apr. 20, 1989)	Rep.	36	Brookfield, Waukesha County	1980
33	Margaret Farrow (from Jul. 11, 1989)	Rep.	54	Elm Grove, Waukesha County	1989

=== Members of the Assembly ===
Members of the Assembly for the Eighty-Ninth Wisconsin Legislature:

Assembly partisan representation Democratic: 56 seats Republican: 43 seats

Senate Dist.	Dist.	Representative	Party	Age (1989)	Home	First Elected
01	01	Lary J. Swoboda	Dem.	49	Luxemburg	1970
01	02	Dale Bolle	Dem.	65	Whitelaw	1982
01	03	Alvin Ott	Rep.	39	Brillion	1986
02	04	Cathy Zeuske	Rep.	30	Shawano	1982
02	05	Gary J. Schmidt	Rep.	41	Chilton	1984
02	06	Rosemary Hinkfuss	Dem.	57	Green Bay	1988
03	07	Gwen Moore	Dem.	37	Milwaukee	1988
03	08	Peter Bock	Dem.	40	Milwaukee	1986
03	09	Walter Kunicki	Dem.	30	Milwaukee	1980
04	10	Betty Jo Nelsen (res. Jan. 12, 1990)	Rep.	53	Shorewood	1979
04	10	Alberta Darling (from May 15, 1990)	Rep.	46	River Hills	1990
04	11	Louis Fortis	Dem.	41	Milwaukee	1986
04	12	Barbara Notestein	Dem.	39	Milwaukee	1984
05	13	Thomas Seery	Dem.	43	Milwaukee	1982
05	14	Thomas Barrett (res. Dec. 13, 1989)	Dem.	35	Milwaukee	1984
05	14	David Cullen (from May 15, 1990)	Dem.	30	Milwaukee	1990
05	15	Shirley Krug	Dem.	30	Milwaukee	1984
06	16	Spencer Coggs	Dem.	39	Milwaukee	1982
06	17	Annette Polly Williams	Dem.	51	Milwaukee	1980
06	18	Marcia P. Coggs	Dem.	60	Milwaukee	1976
07	19	Louise M. Tesmer (res. Jul. 31, 1989)	Dem.	46	Milwaukee	1972
07	19	Rosemary Potter (res. Oct. 26, 1989)	Dem.	37	Milwaukee	1989
07	20	Tim Carpenter	Dem.	28	Milwaukee	1984
07	21	Richard Grobschmidt	Dem.	40	South Milwaukee	1984
08	22	Jeannette Bell	Dem.	47	West Allis	1982
08	23	Thomas A. Hauke	Dem.	50	West Allis	1972
08	24	Peggy Krusick	Dem.	32	Milwaukee	1983
09	25	Vernon W. Holschbach	Dem.	62	Manitowoc	1980
09	26	Calvin Potter	Dem.	43	Kohler	1974
09	27	Wilfrid J. Turba	Rep.	60	Russell	1982
10	28	Harvey Stower	Dem.	44	Amery	1982
10	29	Alvin Baldus	Dem.	62	Menomonie	1966
10	30	Sheila Harsdorf	Rep.	32	River Falls	1988
11	31	Joanne Huelsman	Rep.	50	Waukesha	1982
11	32	Joseph Wimmer	Rep.	54	Waukesha	1982
11	33	Steven Foti	Rep.	30	Oconomowoc	1982
12	34	Jim Holperin	Dem.	38	Eagle River	1982
12	35	Thomas D. Ourada	Rep.	30	Antigo	1984
12	36	John Volk	Dem.	73	Freedom	1983
13	37	Randall J. Radtke	Rep.	37	Lake Mills	1978
13	38	Margaret S. Lewis	Rep.	34	Jefferson	1984
13	39	Robert Goetsch	Rep.	55	Oak Grove	1982
14	40	William Lorge	Rep.	28	Deer Creek	1988
14	41	Robert T. Welch	Rep.	30	Leon	1984
14	42	Ben Brancel	Rep.	38	Douglas	1986
15	43	Charles W. Coleman	Rep.	56	Richmond	1982
15	44	Wayne W. Wood	Dem.	58	Janesville	1976
15	45	Judy Robson	Dem.	49	Beloit	1987
16	46	Thomas A. Loftus	Dem.	43	Sun Prairie	1976
16	47	David G. Deininger	Rep.	41	Monroe	1986
16	48	Sue Rohan	Dem.	36	Monona	1984
17	49	David A. Brandemuehl	Rep.	57	Mount Ida	1986
17	50	Dale Schultz	Rep.	35	Washington	1982
17	51	Joseph E. Tregoning (res. May 28, 1990)	Rep.	47	Shullsburg	1967
17	51	--Vacant from May 28, 1990--				
18	52	Peg Lautenschlager	Dem.	33	Fond du Lac	1988
18	53	Mary Panzer	Rep.	37	West Bend	1980
18	54	Gregg Underheim	Rep.	38	Oshkosh	1987
19	55	Esther K. Walling	Rep.	48	Menasha	1982
19	56	Judith Klusman	Rep.	32	Oshkosh	1988
19	57	David Prosser Jr.	Rep.	46	Appleton	1978
20	58	Steven D. Loucks	Rep.	27	Mequon	1988
20	59	Michael A. Lehman	Rep.	45	Hartford	1988
20	60	Susan B. Vergeront	Rep.	43	Cedarburg	1984
21	61	Scott C. Fergus (res. Jul. 1, 1990)	Dem.	33	Racine	1984
21	61	--Vacant from Jul. 1, 1990--				
21	62	Kimberly Plache	Dem.	27	Racine	1988
21	63	E. James Ladwig	Rep.	50	Caledonia	1978
22	64	Peter W. Barca	Dem.	33	Kenosha	1984
22	65	John Antaramian	Dem.	34	Kenosha	1982
22	66	Cloyd A. Porter	Rep.	53	Burlington	1972
23	67	Leo Richard Hamilton	Dem.	61	Chippewa Falls	1986
23	68	David Zien	Rep.	38	Taft	1988
23	69	Heron Van Gorden	Rep.	62	Neillsville	1982
24	70	Donald W. Hasenohrl	Dem.	53	Pittsville	1974
24	71	Stan Gruszynski	Dem.	39	Stevens Point	1984
24	72	Marlin Schneider	Dem.	46	Wisconsin Rapids	1970
25	73	Frank Boyle	Dem.	43	Summit	1986
25	74	Barbara Linton	Dem.	36	Ashland	1986
25	75	Mary Hubler	Dem.	36	Rice Lake	1984
26	76	Rebecca Young	Dem.	54	Madison	1984
26	77	Spencer Black	Dem.	38	Madison	1984
26	78	David Clarenbach	Dem.	35	Madison	1974
27	79	Joe Wineke	Dem.	31	Verona	1982
27	80	Robert M. Thompson	Dem.	61	Dekorra	1970
27	81	David Travis	Dem.	40	Madison	1978
28	82	James A. Rutkowski	Dem.	46	Hales Corners	1970
28	83	David J. Lepak	Rep.	29	Muskego	1984
28	84	Marc C. Duff	Rep.	27	New Berlin	1988
29	85	Gregory Huber	Dem.	32	Wausau	1988
29	86	Brad Zweck	Dem.	30	Mosinee	1986
29	87	Robert J. Larson	Rep.	56	Medford	1978
30	88	John Gard	Rep.	26	Lena	1987
30	89	Cletus J. Vanderperren	Dem.	76	Pittsfield	1958
30	90	Mary Lou E. Van Dreel	Dem.	53	Green Bay	1986
31	91	Barbara Gronemus	Dem.	57	Whitehall	1982
31	92	Terry Musser	Rep.	41	Irving	1984
31	93	Jacquelyn J. Lahn	Rep.	36	Clear Creek	1988
32	94	Virgil Roberts	Dem.	66	Holmen	1970
32	95	John Medinger	Dem.	40	La Crosse	1976
32	96	DuWayne Johnsrud	Rep.	45	Eastman	1984
33	97	Lolita Schneiders	Rep.	57	Menomonee Falls	1980
33	98	Peggy Rosenzweig	Rep.	52	Wauwatosa	1982
33	99	Margaret Farrow (res. Jul. 11, 1989)	Rep.	54	Elm Grove	1986
33	99	Frank Urban (from Sep. 22, 1989)	Rep.	59	Elm Grove	1989

== Employees ==
=== Senate employees ===
- Chief Clerk: Donald J. Schneider
- Sergeant-at-Arms: Daniel B. Fields

=== Assembly employees ===
- Chief Clerk: Thomas T. Melvin
- Sergeant-at-Arms: Robert G. Johnston
