= 90th Wisconsin Legislature =

Wisconsin legislative term for 1991–1992

←	89th	91st	→
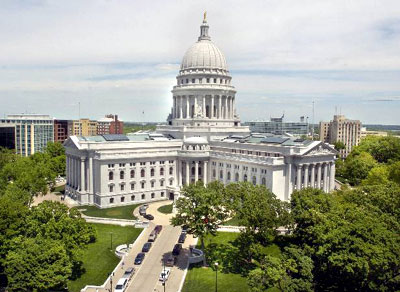
- Wisconsin State Capitol

Overview
- Legislative body: Wisconsin Legislature
- Meeting place: Wisconsin State Capitol
- Term: January 7, 1991 – January 4, 1993
- Election: November 6, 1990

Senate
- Members: 33
- Senate President: Fred Risser (D)
- Party control: Democratic

Assembly
- Members: 99
- Assembly Speaker: Walter Kunicki (D)
- Speaker pro tempore: David Clarenbach (D)
- Party control: Democratic

Sessions
- Regular: January 7, 1991 – January 4, 1993

Special sessions
- Jan. 1991 Spec.: January 29, 1991 – July 4, 1991
- Oct. 1991 Spec.: October 15, 1991 – May 21, 1992
- Apr. 1992 Spec.: April 14, 1992 – June 4, 1992
- Jun. 1992 Spec.: June 1, 1992 – June 1, 1992
- Aug. 1992 Spec.: August 25, 1992 – September 15, 1992

The Ninetieth Wisconsin Legislature convened from January 7, 1991, to January 4, 1993, in regular session, and also convened in five special sessions.

Senators representing odd-numbered districts were newly elected for this session and were serving the first two years of a four-year term. Assembly members were elected to a two-year term. Assembly members and odd-numbered senators were elected in the general election of November 6, 1990. Senators representing even-numbered districts were serving the third and fourth year of a four-year term, having been elected in the general election of November 8, 1988.

The governor of Wisconsin during this entire term was Republican Tommy Thompson, of Juneau County, serving the first two years of his second four-year term, having won re-election in the 1990 Wisconsin gubernatorial election.

== Major events ==
- January 7, 1991: Second inauguration of Tommy Thompson as governor of Wisconsin.
- January 12, 1991: The United States Congress passed a resolution authorizing the use of military force to expel Iraqi forces from Kuwait.
- February 27, 1991: U.S. President George H. W. Bush declared victory in the Gulf War.
- April 2, 1991: 1991 Wisconsin spring election:
  - Wisconsin voters rejected an amendment to the state constitution, which would have enabled the state to take on debt to pay for housing projects.
- December 25, 1991: The Soviet Union was dissolved.
- April 7, 1992: 1992 Wisconsin spring election:
  - Wisconsin voters ratified two amendments to the state constitution:
    - to enable the state to take on debt to pay for railroad projects.
    - to limit legislative pay raises to only take effect after an intervening election.
- June 2, 1992: A three-judge panel of the United States District Court for the Western District of Wisconsin published its decision in Prosser v. Wisconsin State Elections Board, serving as the redistricting plan for Wisconsin for the 1990 United States census.
- September 1, 1992: Wisconsin Supreme Court justice William G. Callow resigned.
- October 8, 1992: Wisconsin governor Tommy Thompson appointed Jon P. Wilcox to the Wisconsin Supreme Court, to fill the vacancy created by the resignation of William G. Callow.
- November 3, 1992: 1992 United States general election:
  - Bill Clinton (D) elected President of the United States.
  - Russ Feingold (D) elected United States senator from Wisconsin.
  - Wisconsin voters rejected an amendment to the state constitution which would have enabled the legislature to grant targeted tax credits to defray property taxes.

== Party summary ==
=== Senate summary ===
Senate partisan composition Democratic: 19 seats Republican: 14 seats

	Party (Shading indicates majority caucus)		Total	
	Dem.	Rep.	Total	Vacant
End of previous Legislature	19	14	33	0
Start of Reg. Session	19	14	33	0
From Jul. 17, 1991 (Note: Republican Richard Kreul (17th District) resigned to accept appointment to a state board.)	19	13	32	1
From Oct. 7, 1991 (Note: Republican Dale Schultz (17th District) was sworn in to replace Richard Kreul.)	19	14	33	0
From Dec. 29, 1992 (Note: Democrat Marvin J. Roshell (23rd District) resigned.)	18	14	32	1
Final voting share	56.25%	43.75%		
Beginning of the next Legislature	15	15	30	3

=== Assembly summary ===
Assembly partisan composition Democratic: 58 seats Republican: 41 seats

	Party (Shading indicates majority caucus)		Total	
	Dem.	Rep.	Total	Vacant
End of previous Legislature	55	42	97	2
Start of Reg. Session	58	41	99	0
From Sep. 16, 1991 (Note: Democrat Brad Zweck (86th District) resigned.)	57	41	98	1
From Oct. 1, 1991 (Note: Republican Joseph Wimmer (32nd District) resigned after he was appointed a Wisconsin circuit court judge.)	57	40	97	2
From Oct. 7, 1991 (Note: Republican Dale Schultz (50th District) resigned after he was elected to the state senate.)	57	39	96	3
From Nov. 27, 1991 (Note: Democrat Thomas J. Springer (86th District) was sworn in to replace Brad Zweck.)	58	39	97	2
From Dec. 26, 1991 (Note: Republican Sheryl Albers (50th District) was sworn in to replace Dale Schultz.)	58	40	98	1
From Jan. 20, 1992 (Note: Republican Scott R. Jensen (32nd District) was sworn in to replace Joseph Wimmer.)	58	41	99	0
Final voting share	58.59%	41.41%		
Beginning of the next Legislature	52	47	99	0

== Sessions ==
- Regular session: January 7, 1991 – January 4, 1993
- January 1991 special session: January 29, 1991 – July 4, 1991
- October 1991 special session: October 15, 1991 – May 21, 1992
- April 1992 special session: April 14, 1992 – June 4, 1992
- June 1992 special session: June 1, 1992
- August 1992 special session: August 25, 1992 – September 15, 1992

== Leadership ==
=== Senate leadership ===
- President of the Senate: Fred Risser (D–Madison)

==== Senate majority leadership ====
- Majority Leader: David Helbach (D–Stevens Point)
- Assistant Majority Leader: Charles Chvala (D–Madison)

==== Senate minority leadership ====
- Minority Leader: Michael G. Ellis (R–Neenah)
- Assistant Minority Leader: Brian Rude (R–Coon Valley)

=== Assembly leadership ===
- Speaker of the Assembly: Walter Kunicki (D–Milwaukee)
- Speaker pro tempore: David Clarenbach (D–Madison)

==== Assembly majority leadership ====
- Majority Leader: David Travis (D–Madison)
- Assistant Majority Leader: Barbara Notestein (D–Milwaukee)

==== Assembly minority leadership ====
- Minority Leader: David Prosser Jr. (R–Appleton)
- Assistant Minority Leader: Randall J. Radtke (R–Lake Mills)

== Members ==
=== Members of the Senate ===
Members of the Senate for the Ninetieth Wisconsin Legislature:

Senate partisan representation Democratic: 19 seats Republican: 14 seats

Dist.	Senator	Party	Age (1991)	Home	First elected
01	Alan Lasee	Rep.	53	Rockland, Brown County	1977
02	Robert Cowles	Rep.	40	Green Bay, Brown County	1987
03	Brian Burke	Dem.	32	Milwaukee, Milwaukee County	1988
04	Barbara Ulichny	Dem.	43	Milwaukee, Milwaukee County	1984
05	Tom Barrett	Dem.	37	Milwaukee, Milwaukee County	1989
06	Gary George	Dem.	36	Milwaukee, Milwaukee County	1980
07	John Plewa	Dem.	45	Milwaukee, Milwaukee County	1984
08	Joseph Czarnezki	Dem.	36	Milwaukee, Milwaukee County	1983
09	Calvin Potter	Dem.	45	Kohler, Sheboygan County	1990
10	William Berndt	Rep.	34	Clifton, Pierce County	1989
11	Joanne Huelsman	Rep.	52	Waukesha, Waukesha County	1990
12	Roger Breske	Dem.	52	Elderon, Marathon County	1990
13	Barbara Lorman	Rep.	58	Fort Atkinson, Jefferson County	1980
14	Joseph Leean	Rep.	48	Waupaca, Waupaca County	1984
15	Timothy Weeden	Rep.	39	Beloit, Rock County	1987
16	Charles Chvala	Dem.	36	Madison, Dane County	1984
17	Richard Kreul (res. Jul. 17, 1991)	Rep.	66	Fennimore, Grant County	1978
17	Dale Schultz (from Oct. 7, 1991)	Rep.	38	Washington, Sauk County	1991
18	Carol Buettner	Rep.	42	Oshkosh, Winnebago County	1987
19	Michael G. Ellis	Rep.	49	Neenah, Winnebago County	1982
20	Donald K. Stitt	Rep.	46	Port Washington, Ozaukee County	1984
21	George Petak	Rep.	41	Racine, Racine County	1990
22	Joseph F. Andrea	Dem.	63	Kenosha, Kenosha County	1984
23	Marvin J. Roshell (res. Dec. 29, 1992)	Dem.	58	Lafayette, Chippewa County	1978
24	David Helbach	Dem.	42	Stevens Point, Portage County	1983
25	Robert Jauch	Dem.	45	Poplar, Douglas County	1986
26	Fred Risser	Dem.	63	Madison, Dane County	1962
27	Russ Feingold	Dem.	37	Middleton, Dane County	1982
28	Lynn Adelman	Dem.	51	New Berlin, Waukesha County	1976
29	Russ Decker	Dem.	37	Schofield, Marathon County	1990
30	Jerome Van Sistine	Dem.	64	Green Bay, Brown County	1976
31	Rodney C. Moen	Dem.	53	Whitehall, Trempealeau County	1982
32	Brian Rude	Rep.	35	Coon Valley, Vernon County	1984
33	Margaret Farrow	Rep.	56	Elm Grove, Waukesha County	1989

=== Members of the Assembly ===
Members of the Assembly for the Ninetieth Wisconsin Legislature:

Assembly partisan representation Democratic: 58 seats Republican: 41 seats

Senate Dist.	Dist.	Representative	Party	Age (1991)	Home	First Elected
01	01	Lary J. Swoboda	Dem.	51	Luxemburg	1970
01	02	Dale Bolle	Dem.	67	Whitelaw	1982
01	03	Alvin Ott	Rep.	41	Brillion	1986
02	04	John Ainsworth	Rep.	50	Waukechon	1990
02	05	William N. Vander Loop	Dem.	58	Kaukauna	1990
02	06	Rosemary Hinkfuss	Dem.	59	Green Bay	1988
03	07	Gwen Moore	Dem.	39	Milwaukee	1988
03	08	Peter Bock	Dem.	42	Milwaukee	1986
03	09	Walter Kunicki	Dem.	32	Milwaukee	1980
04	10	Alberta Darling	Rep.	46	River Hills	1990
04	11	Louis Fortis	Dem.	43	Milwaukee	1986
04	12	Barbara Notestein	Dem.	41	Milwaukee	1984
05	13	Thomas Seery	Dem.	45	Milwaukee	1982
05	14	David Cullen	Dem.	30	Milwaukee	1990
05	15	Shirley Krug	Dem.	32	Milwaukee	1984
06	16	Spencer Coggs	Dem.	41	Milwaukee	1982
06	17	Annette Polly Williams	Dem.	53	Milwaukee	1980
06	18	Marcia P. Coggs	Dem.	62	Milwaukee	1976
07	19	Rosemary Potter	Dem.	38	Milwaukee	1989
07	20	Tim Carpenter	Dem.	30	Milwaukee	1984
07	21	Richard Grobschmidt	Dem.	42	South Milwaukee	1984
08	22	Jeannette Bell	Dem.	49	West Allis	1982
08	23	Thomas A. Hauke	Dem.	52	West Allis	1972
08	24	Peggy Krusick	Dem.	34	Milwaukee	1983
09	25	Vernon W. Holschbach	Dem.	64	Manitowoc	1980
09	26	James Baumgart	Dem.	52	Sheboygan	1990
09	27	Wilfrid J. Turba	Rep.	62	Russell	1982
10	28	Harvey Stower	Dem.	46	Amery	1982
10	29	Alvin Baldus	Dem.	64	Menomonie	1966
10	30	Sheila Harsdorf	Rep.	34	River Falls	1988
11	31	Daniel P. Vrakas	Rep.	35	Hartland	1990
11	32	Joseph Wimmer (res. Oct. 1, 1991)	Rep.	56	Waukesha	1982
11	32	Scott R. Jensen (from Jan. 20, 1992)	Rep.	31	Brookfield	1992
11	33	Steven Foti	Rep.	32	Oconomowoc	1982
12	34	Jim Holperin	Dem.	40	Eagle River	1982
12	35	Thomas D. Ourada	Rep.	32	Antigo	1984
12	36	Jerome T. Schwartz	Dem.	39	Armstrong Creek	1990
13	37	Randall J. Radtke	Rep.	39	Lake Mills	1978
13	38	Stephen Nass	Rep.	38	Whitewater	1990
13	39	Robert Goetsch	Rep.	57	Oak Grove	1982
14	40	William Lorge	Rep.	30	Deer Creek	1988
14	41	Robert T. Welch	Rep.	32	Leon	1984
14	42	Ben Brancel	Rep.	40	Douglas	1986
15	43	Charles W. Coleman	Rep.	58	Richmond	1982
15	44	Wayne W. Wood	Dem.	60	Janesville	1976
15	45	Judy Robson	Dem.	51	Beloit	1987
16	46	Rudy Silbaugh	Rep.	60	Stoughton	1990
16	47	David G. Deininger	Rep.	43	Monroe	1986
16	48	Sue Rohan	Dem.	38	Monona	1984
17	49	David A. Brandemuehl	Rep.	59	Mount Ida	1986
17	50	Dale Schultz (res. Oct. 7, 1991)	Rep.	37	Washington	1982
17	50	Sheryl Albers (from Dec. 26, 1991)	Rep.	37	Westfield	1991
17	51	Stephen Freese	Rep.	30	Jamestown	1990
18	52	Peg Lautenschlager	Dem.	35	Fond du Lac	1988
18	53	Mary Panzer	Rep.	39	West Bend	1980
18	54	Gregg Underheim	Rep.	40	Oshkosh	1987
19	55	Dean Kaufert	Rep.	33	Neenah	1990
19	56	Judith Klusman	Rep.	34	Oshkosh	1988
19	57	David Prosser Jr.	Rep.	48	Appleton	1978
20	58	Steven D. Loucks	Rep.	29	Mequon	1988
20	59	Michael A. Lehman	Rep.	47	Hartford	1988
20	60	Susan B. Vergeront	Rep.	45	Cedarburg	1984
21	61	Robert L. Turner	Dem.	43	Racine	1990
21	62	Kimberly Plache	Dem.	29	Racine	1988
21	63	E. James Ladwig	Rep.	52	Caledonia	1978
22	64	Peter W. Barca	Dem.	35	Kenosha	1984
22	65	John Antaramian	Dem.	36	Kenosha	1982
22	66	Cloyd A. Porter	Rep.	55	Burlington	1972
23	67	Leo Richard Hamilton	Dem.	63	Chippewa Falls	1986
23	68	David Zien	Rep.	40	Eau Claire	1988
23	69	Heron Van Gorden	Rep.	64	Neillsville	1982
24	70	Donald W. Hasenohrl	Dem.	55	Pittsville	1974
24	71	Stan Gruszynski	Dem.	41	Stevens Point	1984
24	72	Marlin Schneider	Dem.	48	Wisconsin Rapids	1970
25	73	Frank Boyle	Dem.	45	Summit	1986
25	74	Barbara Linton	Dem.	38	Ashland	1986
25	75	Mary Hubler	Dem.	38	Rice Lake	1984
26	76	Rebecca Young	Dem.	56	Madison	1984
26	77	Spencer Black	Dem.	40	Madison	1984
26	78	David Clarenbach	Dem.	37	Madison	1974
27	79	Joe Wineke	Dem.	33	Verona	1982
27	80	Eugene Hahn	Rep.	61	Springvale	1990
27	81	David Travis	Dem.	42	Madison	1978
28	82	James A. Rutkowski	Dem.	48	Hales Corners	1970
28	83	Maxine Hough	Dem.	48	East Troy	1990
28	84	Marc C. Duff	Rep.	29	New Berlin	1988
29	85	Gregory Huber	Dem.	34	Wausau	1988
29	86	Brad Zweck (res. Sep. 16, 1991)	Dem.	32	Mosinee	1986
29	86	Thomas J. Springer (from Nov. 27, 1991)	Dem.	23	Mosinee	1991
29	87	Martin Reynolds	Dem.	40	Ladysmith	1990
30	88	John Gard	Rep.	28	Peshtigo	1987
30	89	Cletus J. Vanderperren	Dem.	78	Pittsfield	1958
30	90	Mary Lou E. Van Dreel	Dem.	55	Green Bay	1986
31	91	Barbara Gronemus	Dem.	59	Whitehall	1982
31	92	Terry Musser	Rep.	43	Irving	1984
31	93	Joseph C. Hisrich	Dem.	48	Eau Claire	1990
32	94	Virgil Roberts	Dem.	68	Holmen	1970
32	95	John Medinger	Dem.	42	La Crosse	1976
32	96	DuWayne Johnsrud	Rep.	47	Eastman	1984
33	97	Lolita Schneiders	Rep.	59	Menomonee Falls	1980
33	98	Peggy Rosenzweig	Rep.	54	Wauwatosa	1982
33	99	Frank Urban	Rep.	60	Elm Grove	1989

== Employees ==
=== Senate employees ===
- Chief Clerk: Donald J. Schneider
- Sergeant-at-Arms: Daniel B. Fields

=== Assembly employees ===
- Chief Clerk: Thomas T. Melvin
- Sergeant-at-Arms: Robert G. Johnston
