= 91st Wisconsin Legislature =

Wisconsin legislative term for 1993–1994

←	90th	92nd	→
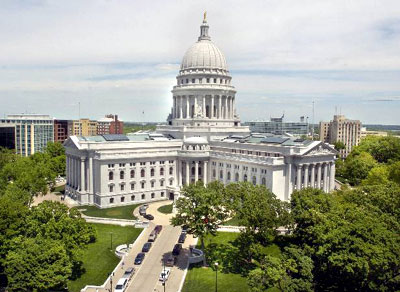
- Wisconsin State Capitol

Overview
- Legislative body: Wisconsin Legislature
- Meeting place: Wisconsin State Capitol
- Term: January 4, 1993 – January 2, 1995
- Election: November 3, 1992

Senate
- Members: 33
- Senate President: Fred Risser (D) ^{until Apr. 20, 1993}; Brian Rude (R) ^{after Apr. 20, 1993}
- President pro tempore: Alan Lasee (R) ^{after Apr. 20, 1993}
- Party control: Democratic ^{until Apr. 20, 1993}; Republican ^{after Apr. 20, 1993}

Assembly
- Members: 99
- Assembly Speaker: Walter Kunicki (D)
- Speaker pro tempore: Tim Carpenter (D)
- Party control: Democratic

Sessions
- Regular: January 4, 1993 – January 3, 1995

Special sessions
- May 1994 Spec.: May 18, 1994 – May 19, 1994
- Jun. 1994 Spec.: June 7, 1994 – June 23, 1994

The Ninety-First Wisconsin Legislature convened from January 4, 1993, to January 3, 1995, in regular session, and also convened in two special sessions.

This was the first legislative session after the redistricting of the Senate and Assembly according to a decision of a three-judge panel of the United States District Court for the Western District of Wisconsin in 1992.

Senators representing even-numbered districts were newly elected for this session and were serving the first two years of a four-year term. Assembly members were elected to a two-year term. Assembly members and even-numbered senators were elected in the general election of November 3, 1992. Senators representing odd-numbered districts were serving the third and fourth year of a four-year term, having been elected in the general election of November 6, 1990.

The governor of Wisconsin during this entire term was Republican Tommy Thompson, of Juneau County, serving the second two years of his second four-year term, having won re-election in the 1990 Wisconsin gubernatorial election.

== Major events ==
- January 20, 1993: Inauguration of Bill Clinton as the 42nd President of the United States.
- February 26, 1993: A truck bomb was detonated by terrorists below the north tower of the World Trade Center, resulting in 6 deaths.
- April 6, 1993: 1993 Wisconsin spring election:
  - Wisconsin voters ratified two amendments to the state constitution:
    - Creating a new section in the enumeration of rights to say crime victims are entitled to dignity, fairness, and respect for privacy.
    - Updating the constitutional prohibition on gambling to differentiate from the specific lottery exceptions enumerated in other parts of the constitution.
- April 19, 1993: The Waco siege ended with a gun battle and fire that killed 67 people, including the sect leader David Koresh.
- September 4, 1993: Wisconsin governor Tommy Thompson appointed Janine P. Geske to the Wisconsin Supreme Court, to succeed Louis J. Ceci, whose resignation became effective the same day.
- November 1, 1993: The Maastricht Treaty went into effect, establishing the European Union.
- December 8, 1993: U.S. President Bill Clinton signed the North American Free Trade Agreement.
- September 13, 1994: U.S. President Bill Clinton signed the Federal Assault Weapons Ban.
- November 8, 1994: 1994 United States general election:
  - Tommy Thompson (R) re-elected Governor of Wisconsin, his third term.
  - Herb Kohl (D) re-elected United States senator from Wisconsin.

== Major legislation ==
- December 30, 1993: An Act relating to: creating the office of the commissioner of railroads, transferring railroad regulation from the public service commission to the office of the commissioner of railroads, granting rule-making authority and making an appropriation, 1993 Act 123. Re-established the Office of the Commissioner of Railroads.

== Party summary ==
=== Senate summary ===
Senate partisan composition Democratic: 16 seats Republican: 17 seats

	Party (Shading indicates majority caucus)		Total	
	Dem.	Rep.	Total	Vacant
End of previous Legislature	18	14	32	1
Start of Reg. Session (Note: Democrats Tom Barrett (5th District), Marvin J. Roshell (23rd District), and Russ Feingold (27th District) resigned before the start of the session.)	15	15	30	3
From Apr. 20, 1993 (Note: Republicans Peggy Rosenzweig (5th District) and David Zien (23rd District), and Democrat Joe Wineke (27th District) were sworn in to replace Tom Barrett, Marvin J. Roshell, and Russ Feingold, respectively.)	16	17	33	0
From Jul. 21, 1993 (Note: Republican Donald K. Stitt (20th District) resigned.)	16	16	32	1
From Sep. 30, 1993 (Note: Republican Mary Panzer (20th District) was sworn in to replace Donald K. Stitt.)	16	17	33	0
Final voting share	48.48%	51.52%		
Beginning of the next Legislature	16	17	33	0

=== Assembly summary ===
Assembly partisan composition Democratic: 52 seats Republican: 47 seats

	Party (Shading indicates majority caucus)		Total	
	Dem.	Rep.	Total	Vacant
End of previous Legislature	58	41	99	0
Start of Reg. Session	52	47	99	0
From Apr. 20, 1993 (Note: Republicans Peggy Rosenzweig (14th District) and David Zien (68th District), and Democrat Joe Wineke (79th District) resigned after their elections to the state senate.)	51	45	96	3
From Jun. 8, 1993 (Note: Democrat Peter W. Barca (64th District) resigned after his election to the United States House of Representatives.)	50	45	95	4
From Jun. 30, 1993 (Note: Republican Scott Walker (14th District) was sworn in to replace Peggy Rosenzweig.)	50	46	96	3
From Jul. 9, 1993 (Note: Democrat David Plombon (68th District) was sworn in to replace David Zien.)	51	46	97	2
From Jul. 11, 1993 (Note: Republican Rick Skindrud (79th District) was sworn in to replace Joe Wineke.)	51	47	98	1
From Sep. 13, 1993 (Note: Democrat James Kreuser (64th District) was sworn in to replace Peter W. Barca.)	52	47	99	0
From Sep. 30, 1993 (Note: Republican Mary Panzer (59th District) resigned after her election to the state senate.)	52	46	98	1
From Dec. 16, 1993 (Note: Republican Glenn Grothman (59th District) was sworn in to replace Mary Panzer.)	52	47	99	0
Final voting share	52.53%	47.47%		
Beginning of the next Legislature	48	51	99	0

== Sessions ==
- Regular session: January 4, 1993 – January 3, 1995
- May 1994 special session: May 18, 1994 – May 19, 1994
- June 1994 special session: June 7, 1994 – June 23, 1994

== Leadership ==
=== Senate leadership ===
- President of the Senate: Fred Risser (D–Madison) (until Apr. 20, 1993)
  - Brian Rude (R–Coon Valley) (after Apr. 20, 1993)
- President pro tempore: --Vacant before Apr. 20, 1993--
  - Alan Lasee (R–Rockland) (after Apr. 20, 1993)

==== Senate majority leadership ====
- Majority Leader: David Helbach (D–Stevens Point) (until Apr. 20, 1993)
  - Michael G. Ellis (R–Neenah) (after Apr. 20, 1993)
- Assistant Majority Leader: Charles Chvala (D–Madison) (until Apr. 20, 1993)
  - Margaret Farrow (R–Elm Grove) (after Apr. 20, 1993)

==== Senate minority leadership ====
- Minority Leader: Michael G. Ellis (R–Neenah) (until Apr. 20, 1993)
  - David Helbach (D–Stevens Point) (from Apr. 20, 1993 to May 12, 1993)
  - Robert Jauch (D–Poplar) (after May 12, 1993)
- Assistant Minority Leader: Brian Rude (R–Coon Valley) (until Apr. 20, 1993)
  - Fred Risser (D–Madison) (after Apr. 20, 1993)

=== Assembly leadership ===
- Speaker of the Assembly: Walter Kunicki (D–Milwaukee)
- Speaker pro tempore: Tim Carpenter (D–Milwaukee)

==== Assembly majority leadership ====
- Majority Leader: David Travis (D–Madison)
- Assistant Majority Leader: Barbara Notestein (D–Milwaukee)

==== Assembly minority leadership ====
- Minority Leader: David Prosser Jr. (R–Appleton)
- Assistant Minority Leader: Robert T. Welch (R–Marion)

== Members ==
=== Members of the Senate ===
Members of the Senate for the Ninety-First Wisconsin Legislature:

Senate partisan representation Democratic: 16 seats Republican: 17 seats

Dist.	Senator	Party	Age (1993)	Home	First elected
01	Alan Lasee	Rep.	55	Rockland, Brown County	1977
02	Robert Cowles	Rep.	42	Green Bay, Brown County	1987
03	Brian Burke	Dem.	34	Milwaukee, Milwaukee County	1988
04	Gwen Moore	Dem.	41	Milwaukee, Milwaukee County	1992
05	--Vacant until Apr. 20, 1993--				
05	Peggy Rosenzweig (from Apr. 20, 1993)	Rep.	56	Wauwatosa, Milwaukee County	1993
06	Gary George	Dem.	38	Milwaukee, Milwaukee County	1980
07	John Plewa	Dem.	47	Milwaukee, Milwaukee County	1984
08	Alberta Darling	Rep.	48	River Hills, Milwaukee County	1992
09	Calvin Potter	Dem.	47	Kohler, Sheboygan County	1990
10	Alice Clausing	Dem.	48	Menomonie, Dunn County	1992
11	Joanne Huelsman	Rep.	54	Waukesha, Waukesha County	1990
12	Roger Breske	Dem.	54	Elderon, Marathon County	1990
13	Barbara Lorman	Rep.	60	Fort Atkinson, Jefferson County	1980
14	Joseph Leean	Rep.	50	Dayton, Waupaca County	1984
15	Timothy Weeden	Rep.	41	Beloit, Rock County	1987
16	Charles Chvala	Dem.	38	Madison, Dane County	1984
17	Dale Schultz	Rep.	39	Washington, Sauk County	1991
18	Carol Buettner	Rep.	44	Oshkosh, Winnebago County	1987
19	Michael G. Ellis	Rep.	51	Neenah, Winnebago County	1982
20	Donald K. Stitt (res. Jul. 21, 1993)	Rep.	48	Port Washington, Ozaukee County	1984
20	Mary Panzer (from Sep. 30, 1993)	Rep.	42	West Bend, Washington County	1993
21	George Petak	Rep.	43	Racine, Racine County	1990
22	Joseph F. Andrea	Dem.	65	Kenosha, Kenosha County	1984
23	--Vacant until Apr. 20, 1993--				
23	David Zien (from Apr. 20, 1993)	Rep.	43	Eau Claire, Eau Claire County	1993
24	David Helbach	Dem.	44	Stevens Point, Portage County	1983
25	Robert Jauch	Dem.	47	Poplar, Douglas County	1986
26	Fred Risser	Dem.	65	Madison, Dane County	1962
27	--Vacant until Apr. 20, 1993--				
27	Joe Wineke (from Apr. 20, 1993)	Dem.	36	Verona, Dane County	1993
28	Lynn Adelman	Dem.	53	Mukwonago, Waukesha County	1976
29	Russ Decker	Dem.	39	Schofield, Marathon County	1990
30	Gary Drzewiecki	Rep.	38	Pulaski, Brown County	1992
31	Rodney C. Moen	Dem.	55	Whitehall, Trempealeau County	1982
32	Brian Rude	Rep.	37	Coon Valley, Vernon County	1984
33	Margaret Farrow	Rep.	58	Elm Grove, Waukesha County	1989

=== Members of the Assembly ===
Members of the Assembly for the Ninety-First Wisconsin Legislature:

Assembly partisan representation Democratic: 52 seats Republican: 47 seats

Senate Dist.	Dist.	Representative	Party	Age (1993)	Home	First Elected
01	01	Lary J. Swoboda	Dem.	53	Luxemburg	1970
01	02	Dale Bolle	Dem.	69	Whitelaw	1982
01	03	Alvin Ott	Rep.	43	Brillion	1986
02	04	Mark A. Green	Rep.	32	Green Bay	1992
02	05	William N. Vander Loop	Dem.	60	Kaukauna	1990
02	06	John Ainsworth	Rep.	52	Waukechon	1990
03	07	Peter Bock	Dem.	44	Milwaukee	1986
03	08	Walter Kunicki	Dem.	34	Milwaukee	1980
03	09	Tim Carpenter	Dem.	32	Milwaukee	1984
04	10	Annette Polly Williams	Dem.	55	Milwaukee	1980
04	11	Johnnie E. Morris-Tatum	Dem.	41	Milwaukee	1992
04	12	Shirley Krug	Dem.	34	Milwaukee	1984
05	13	David Cullen	Dem.	32	Milwaukee	1990
05	14	Peggy Rosenzweig (res. Apr. 20, 1993)	Rep.	56	Wauwatosa	1982
05	14	Scott Walker (from Jun. 30, 1993)	Rep.	25	Wauwatosa	1993
05	15	Jeannette Bell	Dem.	51	West Allis	1982
06	16	Leon Young	Dem.	25	Milwaukee	1992
06	17	Spencer Coggs	Dem.	43	Milwaukee	1982
06	18	Antonio R. Riley	Dem.	29	Milwaukee	1992
07	19	Barbara Notestein	Dem.	43	Milwaukee	1984
07	20	Rosemary Potter	Dem.	40	Milwaukee	1989
07	21	Richard Grobschmidt	Dem.	44	South Milwaukee	1984
08	22	Polly W. Beal	Rep.	50	River Hills	1992
08	23	John La Fave	Dem.	43	Brown Deer	1992
08	24	Lolita Schneiders	Rep.	61	Menomonee Falls	1980
09	25	Bob Ziegelbauer	Dem.	41	Manitowoc	1992
09	26	James Baumgart	Dem.	54	Sheboygan	1990
09	27	Clifford Otte	Rep.	59	Sheboygan Falls	1992
10	28	Harvey Stower	Dem.	48	Amery	1982
10	29	Alvin Baldus	Dem.	66	Menomonie	1966
10	30	Sheila Harsdorf	Rep.	36	River Falls	1988
11	31	Stephen Nass	Rep.	40	Whitewater	1990
11	32	Scott R. Jensen	Rep.	32	Waukesha	1992
11	33	Daniel P. Vrakas	Rep.	37	Hartland	1990
12	34	Jim Holperin	Dem.	42	Eagle River	1982
12	35	Thomas D. Ourada	Rep.	34	Antigo	1984
12	36	Lorraine Seratti	Rep.	43	Florence	1992
13	37	David W. Ward	Rep.	39	Fort Atkinson	1992
13	38	Steven Foti	Rep.	34	Oconomowoc	1982
13	39	Robert Goetsch	Rep.	59	Oak Grove	1982
14	40	William Lorge	Rep.	32	Deer Creek	1988
14	41	Robert T. Welch	Rep.	34	Marion	1984
14	42	Ben Brancel	Rep.	42	Douglas	1986
15	43	Charles W. Coleman	Rep.	60	Richmond	1982
15	44	Wayne W. Wood	Dem.	62	Janesville	1976
15	45	Judy Robson	Dem.	53	Beloit	1987
16	46	Rudy Silbaugh	Rep.	62	Stoughton	1990
16	47	Eugene Hahn	Rep.	63	Springvale	1990
16	48	Doris Hanson	Dem.	67	McFarland	1992
17	49	David A. Brandemuehl	Rep.	61	Mount Ida	1986
17	50	Sheryl Albers	Rep.	38	Freedom	1991
17	51	Stephen Freese	Rep.	32	Jamestown	1990
18	52	John P. Dobyns	Rep.	48	Fond du Lac	1992
18	53	Carol Owens	Rep.	61	Nekimi	1992
18	54	Gregg Underheim	Rep.	42	Oshkosh	1987
19	55	Dean Kaufert	Rep.	35	Neenah	1990
19	56	Judith Klusman	Rep.	36	Clayton	1988
19	57	David Prosser Jr.	Rep.	50	Appleton	1978
20	58	Michael A. Lehman	Rep.	49	Hartford	1988
20	59	Mary Panzer (res. Sep. 30, 1993)	Rep.	41	West Bend	1980
20	59	Glenn Grothman (from Dec. 16, 1993)	Rep.	38	West Bend	1993
20	60	Susan B. Vergeront	Rep.	47	Cedarburg	1984
21	61	Robert L. Turner	Dem.	45	Racine	1990
21	62	Kimberly Plache	Dem.	31	Racine	1988
21	63	Bonnie Ladwig	Rep.	53	Caledonia	1992
22	64	Peter W. Barca (res. Jun. 8, 1993)	Dem.	37	Kenosha	1984
22	64	James Kreuser (from Sep. 13, 1993)	Dem.	38	Kenosha	1993
22	65	Robert Wirch	Dem.	49	Kenosha	1992
22	66	Cloyd A. Porter	Rep.	57	Burlington	1972
23	67	Michael O. Wilder	Dem.	51	Chippewa Falls	1992
23	68	David Zien (res. Apr. 20, 1993)	Rep.	42	Eau Claire	1988
23	68	David Plombon (res. Jul. 9, 1993)	Dem.	32	Delmar	1993
23	69	Robert K. Zukowski	Rep.	62	Reseburg	1992
24	70	Donald W. Hasenohrl	Dem.	57	Pittsville	1974
24	71	Stan Gruszynski	Dem.	43	Stevens Point	1984
24	72	Marlin Schneider	Dem.	50	Wisconsin Rapids	1970
25	73	Frank Boyle	Dem.	47	Summit	1986
25	74	Barbara Linton	Dem.	40	Ashland	1986
25	75	Mary Hubler	Dem.	40	Rice Lake	1984
26	76	Rebecca Young	Dem.	58	Madison	1984
26	77	Spencer Black	Dem.	42	Madison	1984
26	78	Tammy Baldwin	Dem.	30	Madison	1992
27	79	Joe Wineke (res. Apr. 20, 1993)	Dem.	35	Verona	1982
27	79	Rick Skindrud (from Jul 11, 1993)	Rep.	48	Primrose	1993
27	80	David G. Deininger	Rep.	45	Monroe	1986
27	81	David Travis	Dem.	44	Madison	1978
28	82	James A. Rutkowski	Dem.	50	Greenfield	1970
28	83	Kathleen A. Krosnicki	Rep.	42	Muskego	1992
28	84	Mary Lazich	Rep.	40	New Berlin	1992
29	85	Gregory Huber	Dem.	36	Wausau	1988
29	86	Thomas J. Springer	Dem.	24	Mosinee	1991
29	87	Martin Reynolds	Dem.	42	Ladysmith	1990
30	88	Rosemary Hinkfuss	Dem.	61	Green Bay	1988
30	89	John Gard	Rep.	29	Peshtigo	1987
30	90	John Joseph Ryba	Dem.	63	Green Bay	1992
31	91	Barbara Gronemus	Dem.	61	Whitehall	1982
31	92	Terry Musser	Rep.	45	Irving	1984
31	93	Robin Kreibich	Rep.	33	Eau Claire	1992
32	94	Virgil Roberts	Dem.	70	Holmen	1970
32	95	Mark Meyer	Dem.	29	La Crosse	1992
32	96	DuWayne Johnsrud	Rep.	49	Eastman	1984
33	97	Peggy Krusick	Dem.	36	Milwaukee	1983
33	98	Marc C. Duff	Rep.	31	New Berlin	1988
33	99	Frank Urban	Rep.	62	Brookfield	1989

== Employees ==
=== Senate employees ===
- Chief Clerk: Donald J. Schneider
- Sergeant-at-Arms: Daniel B. Fields (res. Aug. 2, 1993)
  - Jon H. Hochkammer (after Jan. 1994)

=== Assembly employees ===
- Chief Clerk: Thomas T. Melvin
- Sergeant-at-Arms: Robert G. Johnston

== Changes from the 90th Legislature ==
New districts for the 91st Legislature were defined in the case of Prosser v. Wisconsin State Elections Board, decided by a three-judge panel of the United States District Court for the Western District of Wisconsin. This was the second time redistricting in Wisconsin was performed by a federal court.

=== Senate redistricting ===
==== Summary of Senate changes ====
- No districts were left unchanged
- Milwaukee County went from having 6 whole districts and part of two additional districts down to 5 whole districts (3, 4, 5, 6, 7) and part of three additional districts (8, 28, 33).

==== Senate districts ====
Map after redistricting, changes highlighted. Territory which was moved to a new district Districts which contain none of their prior territory

Dist.	90th Legislature	91st Legislature
01	Door, Kewaunee counties and most of Calumet County, northern Manitowoc County, and parts of northeast Fond du Lac County, southern Outagamie County, and southern and eastern Brown County	Door, Kewaunee counties and most of Calumet County, northern Manitowoc County, and parts of northeast Fond du Lac County, southeast Outagamie County, and southern and eastern Brown County
02	Most of eastern Outagamie County, most of eastern Shawano County, parts of central Oconto County and central Brown County	Most of Shawano County, most of eastern and northern Outagamie County, parts of central Oconto County and western Brown County
03	Milwaukee County (city central)	Milwaukee County (city southwest)
04	Milwaukee County (northeast)	Milwaukee County (city north)
05	Milwaukee County (northwest)	Milwaukee County (west)
06	Milwaukee County (city north)	Milwaukee County (city west)
07	Milwaukee County (southeast)	Milwaukee County (southeast)
08	Milwaukee County (middle-west)	Milwaukee County (north) and parts of southern Outagamie County, northeast Waukesha County, and southern Washington County
09	Most of Sheboygan County and southern Manitowoc County and part of southeast Calumet County	Most of Sheboygan County and southern Manitowoc County and part of southeast Calumet County
10	Burnett, Pierce, Polk, St. Croix counties and western Dunn County	Burnett, Pierce, St. Croix counties, most of Polk County, and parts of western Dunn County
11	Most of Waukesha County and parts of southern Washington County and eastern Jefferson County	Most of Waukesha County, southeast Jefferson County, and parts of southern Washington County, northwest Walworth County, and northeast Rock County
12	Florence, Forest, Langlade, Lincoln, Menominee, Oneida, Vilas and northern Marinette County, western Shawano County, and parts of northern Oconto County, and northern and eastern Marathon County	Florence, Forest, Langlade, Lincoln, Menominee, Oneida, Vilas and northern Marinette County, western Shawano County, and parts of northern Oconto County, northern and eastern Marathon County, northeast Portage County, and northwest Waupaca County
13	Most of Jefferson County and most of Dodge County and part of northeast Rock County	Most of Jefferson County and most of Dodge County and parts of northeast Rock County, northwest Walworth County, and southwestern Fond du Lac County
14	Green Lake, Marquette, Waushara counties, most of Juneau County, and most of Waupaca County and parts of western Outagamie County, western Fond du Lac County, western Winnebago County, southeast Monroe County, and southern and eastern Adams County	Green Lake, Marquette, most of Waushara County, most of Waupaca County, and parts of western Outagamie County, western Fond du Lac County, southwest Winnebago County, southern Adams County, northwest Columbia County, and eastern Sauk County
15	Central and southeast Rock County and most of Walworth County	Central and southeast Rock County and most of Walworth County
16	Eastern Dane County, most of Green County, and parts of southeast Jefferson County and northern and western Rock County	Eastern and northern Dane County and most of southern and eastern Columbia County
17	Iowa, Lafayette, Richland counties and most of Grant County, most of Sauk County, and parts of southeast Vernon County and southern Juneau County	Iowa, Lafayette, Juneau, and Grant County, most of Sauk County, and parts of eastern Richland County
18	Most of eastern Fond du Lac County and parts of southeast Winnebago County, southwest Sheboygan County, northwest Ozaukee County, and northeast Washington County	Most of Fond du Lac County and parts of southern Winnebago County and northeast Dodge County
19	Most of Winnebago County and parts of southern Outagamie County and central Fond du Lac County	Northern Winnebago County and parts of southern and central Outagamie County
20	Most of Ozaukee County, most of Washington County, and parts of southeast Sheboygan County, eastern Dodge County, and southeast Fond du Lac County	Most of Ozaukee County, most of Washington County, and parts of southeast Sheboygan County and eastern Dodge County
21	Racine County (eastern half)	Racine County (eastern quarter and southern half)
22	Kenosha County and parts of southwest Racine County and southeast Walworth County	Kenosha County and parts of southwest Racine County and southeast Walworth County
23	Most of Chippewa County, most of Clark County, eastern Dunn county, most of western Taylor County, and parts of western Marathon County, northwest Eau Claire County, and southern Rusk County	Chippewa and Clark, most of Dunn County, and parts of western Marathon County, western Wood County, and northern and eastern Eau Claire County
24	Portage and Wood counties and most of northern Adams County and parts of western Waupaca County and southwest Marathon County	Most of Portage County, most of Wood County, most of Juneau County, and parts of northwest Waushara County
25	Ashland, Bayfield, Douglas, Iron, Sawyer, Washburn counties and most of Barron County and part of northeast Rusk County	Ashland, Barron, Bayfield, Douglas, Iron, Sawyer, Washburn counties and part of eastern Polk County
26	Dane County (Madison)	Dane County (Madison)
27	Most of Columbia County, western Dane County, and parts of northern Green County, northwest Rock County, western Dodge County, and northeast Sauk County	Green County, Southwest Dane County, and most of western Rock County
28	Milwaukee (southwest) and parts of southeast Waukesha County, western Racine County, and northeast Walworth County	Milwaukee (southwest) and parts of southeast Waukesha County, northwest Racine County, and northeast Walworth County
29	Price County and most of Rusk County, most of Marathon County, eastern Taylor County, and parts of western Shawano County, northwest Waupaca County, northern Chippewa County, and eastern Barron County	Price, Rusk, Taylor, and most of Marathon County
30	Northwest Brown County and southern Marinette County and parts of eastern Oconto County and eastern Shawano County	Northwest Brown County and southern Marinette County and parts of eastern Oconto County
31	Buffalo, Jackson, Pepin, Trempealeau counties and most of Eau Claire County, northern Monroe County, and part of western Clark County	Buffalo, Jackson, Pepin, Trempealeau counties and most of Monroe County, and parts of western and southern Eau Claire County
32	Crawford, La Crosse counties and most of Vernon County, and parts of northern Grant County and southwest Monroe County	Crawford, La Crosse, and Vernon counties, western Richland County, and part of southwest Monroe County
33	Northeast Waukesha County and parts of western Milwaukee County	Parts of eastern Waukesha County and southwest Milwaukee County
