= 2016 Wisconsin State Assembly election =

- November 8, 2016

All 99 seats of the Wisconsin State Assembly 50 seats are needed for a majority
- Turnout: 67.34%
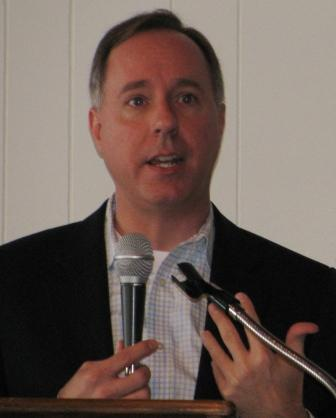

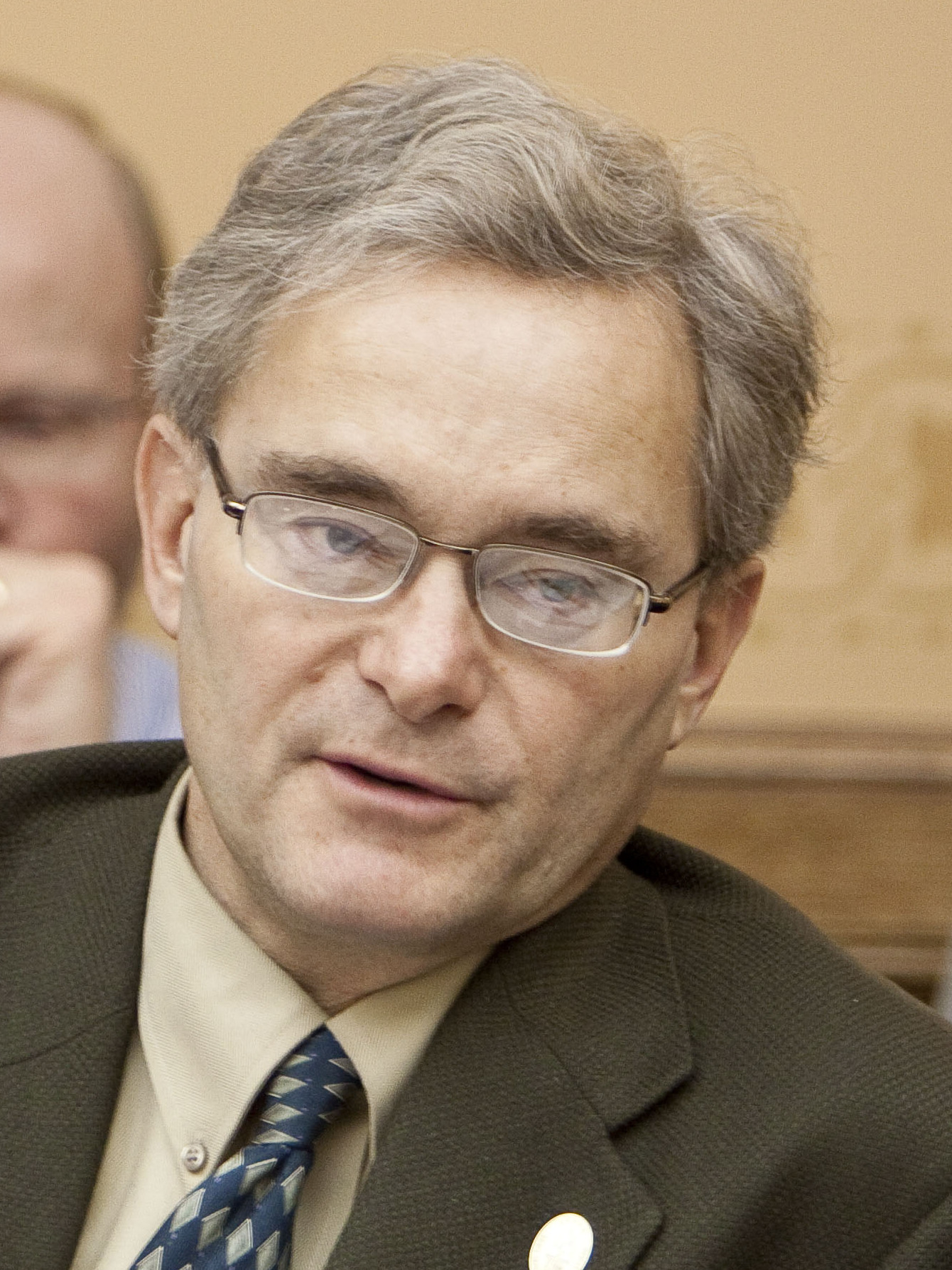
	Majority party	Minority party
Leader	Robin Vos	Peter W. Barca
Party	Republican	Democratic
Leader since	January 7, 2013	January 3, 2011
Leader's seat	63rd–Rochester	64th–Kenosha
Last election	63 seats, 56.44%	36 seats, 42.20%
Seats before	63	36
Seats won	64	35
Seat change	▲1	▼1
Popular vote	1,337,291	1,175,779
Percentage	51.7%	45.5%
- Results: Republican hold Republican gain Democratic hold Vote share: 50–60% 60–70% 70–80% >90% 50–60% 60–70% 70–80% 80–90% >90%
Speaker before election
Robin Vos
Republican
Elected Speaker
Robin Vos
Republican

An election was held on November 8, 2016 to elect all 99 members to Wisconsin's State Assembly. It coincided with elections for other offices, including U.S. president, U.S. Senate, U.S. House of Representatives and state senate. The primary election was held on August 9, 2016.

Republicans consolidated their control of the Assembly by gaining one seat, winning 64 seats compared to 36 seats for the Democrats.

== Predictions ==
Source	Ranking	As of
Governing	Lean R	October 12, 2016

== Results ==
=== Statewide ===
Statewide results of the 2016 Wisconsin State Assembly election:

Party	Candi- dates	Votes		Seats		
Party	Candi- dates	No.	%	No.	+/–	%
Republican Party	71	1,337,291	51.69%	64	▲1	64.65%
Democratic Party	79	1,175,779	45.45%	35	▼1	35.35%
Independent	8	43,004	1.66%	0	Steady	0.00%
Libertarian Party	3	12,092	0.47%	0	Steady	0.00%
Veterans Party	1	1,580	0.06%	0	Steady	0.00%
Scattering		17,425	0.67%	0	Steady	0.00%
Total	162	2,587,171	100.00%	99	Steady	100.00%

=== District ===
Results of the 2016 Wisconsin State Assembly election by district:

District	Democratic		Republican		Others		Total		Result
District	Votes	%	Votes	%	Votes	%	Votes	%	Result
District 1	13,289	39.85%	20,044	60.11%	14	0.04%	33,347	100.00%	Republican hold
District 2	-	-	20,039	69.29%	8,881	30.71%	28,920	100.00%	Republican hold
District 3	11,969	39.46%	18,361	60.54%	-	-	30,330	100.00%	Republican hold
District 4	12,016	40.23%	17,817	59.65%	34	0.11%	29,867	100.00%	Republican hold
District 5	10,933	35.40%	19,941	64.58%	6	0.02%	30,880	100.00%	Republican hold
District 6	7,944	29.82%	18,690	70.15%	8	0.03%	26,642	100.00%	Republican hold
District 7	13,514	56.14%	9,212	38.27%	1,347	5.60%	24,073	100.00%	Democratic hold
District 8	8,528	98.45%	-	-	134	1.55%	8,662	100.00%	Democratic hold
District 9	12,142	97.97%	-	-	251	2.03%	12,393	100.00%	Democratic hold
District 10	21,228	99.11%	-	-	190	0.89%	21,418	100.00%	Democratic hold
District 11	18,418	98.76%	-	-	232	1.24%	18,650	100.00%	Democratic hold
District 12	18,642	98.42%	-	-	299	1.58%	18,941	100.00%	Democratic hold
District 13	-	-	23,904	96.99%	741	3.01%	24,645	100.00%	Republican hold
District 14	14,934	42.70%	20,001	57.19%	40	0.11%	34,975	100.00%	Republican hold
District 15	-	-	21,525	97.54%	542	2.46%	22,067	100.00%	Republican hold
District 16	18,019	98.43%	-	-	287	1.57%	18,306	100.00%	Democratic hold
District 17	21,715	99.07%	-	-	204	0.93%	21,919	100.00%	Democratic hold
District 18	18,006	98.87%	-	-	206	1.13%	18,212	100.00%	Democratic hold
District 19	26,732	97.54%	-	-	674	2.46%	27,406	100.00%	Democratic hold
District 20	21,222	97.02%	-	-	651	2.98%	21,873	100.00%	Democratic hold
District 21	11,338	40.53%	16,589	59.30%	48	0.17%	27,975	100.00%	Republican hold
District 22	-	-	26,131	97.82%	582	2.18%	26,713	100.00%	Republican hold
District 23	-	-	25,670	95.57%	1,190	4.43%	26,860	100.00%	Republican hold
District 24	-	-	24,047	96.48%	878	3.52%	24,925	100.00%	Republican hold
District 25	9,305	34.89%	17,325	64.97%	37	0.14%	26,667	100.00%	Republican hold
District 26	11,283	40.39%	16,583	59.36%	72	0.26%	27,938	100.00%	Republican hold
District 27	11,501	38.04%	18,644	61.66%	92	0.30%	30,237	100.00%	Republican hold
District 28	9,837	33.88%	17,612	60.66%	1,583	5.45%	29,032	100.00%	Republican hold
District 29	10,661	38.83%	16,774	61.10%	19	0.07%	27,454	100.00%	Republican hold
District 30	12,358	38.94%	17,790	56.05%	1,591	5.01%	31,739	100.00%	Republican hold
District 31	10,348	35.88%	18,465	64.02%	30	0.10%	28,843	100.00%	Republican hold
District 32	10,090	37.38%	16,862	62.47%	42	0.16%	26,994	100.00%	Republican hold
District 33	11,246	37.34%	18,851	62.59%	23	0.08%	30,120	100.00%	Republican hold
District 34	12,715	36.93%	21,686	62.99%	28	0.08%	34,429	100.00%	Republican hold
District 35	9,564	33.91%	18,622	66.02%	22	0.08%	28,208	100.00%	Republican hold
District 36	-	-	22,899	99.92%	18	0.08%	22,917	100.00%	Republican hold
District 37	10,990	38.10%	17,821	61.78%	37	0.13%	28,848	100.00%	Republican hold
District 38	12,288	37.20%	20,708	62.70%	33	0.10%	33,029	100.00%	Republican hold
District 39	9,192	32.57%	19,028	67.42%	2	0.01%	28,222	100.00%	Republican hold
District 40	9,801	35.41%	17,866	64.55%	11	0.04%	27,678	100.00%	Republican hold
District 41	-	-	17,711	70.55%	7,394	29.45%	25,105	100.00%	Republican hold
District 42	11,867	41.31%	16,842	58.63%	18	0.06%	28,727	100.00%	Republican hold
District 43	16,179	54.56%	13,427	45.28%	45	0.15%	29,651	100.00%	Democratic hold
District 44	19,948	98.51%	-	-	301	1.49%	20,249	100.00%	Democratic hold
District 45	17,867	98.00%	-	-	364	2.00%	18,231	100.00%	Democratic hold
District 46	24,678	98.19%	-	-	454	1.81%	25,132	100.00%	Democratic hold
District 47	19,154	68.47%	-	-	8,822	31.53%	27,976	100.00%	Democratic hold
District 48	26,534	98.76%	-	-	333	1.24%	26,867	100.00%	Democratic hold
District 49	11,344	42.94%	15,056	56.99%	18	0.07%	26,418	100.00%	Republican hold
District 50	10,762	42.13%	14,774	57.83%	11	0.04%	25,547	100.00%	Republican hold
District 51	13,189	48.62%	13,912	51.29%	23	0.08%	27,124	100.00%	Republican hold
District 52	9,829	36.24%	17,293	63.76%	-	-	27,122	100.00%	Republican hold
District 53	-	-	21,641	98.92%	236	1.08%	21,877	100.00%	Republican hold
District 54	17,923	69.46%	-	-	7,879	30.54%	25,802	100.00%	Democratic hold
District 55	11,523	38.46%	18,393	61.40%	42	0.14%	29,958	100.00%	Republican hold
District 56	11,551	35.45%	21,022	64.52%	10	0.03%	32,583	100.00%	Republican hold
District 57	19,048	98.68%	-	-	255	1.32%	19,303	100.00%	Democratic hold
District 58	-	-	25,457	98.13%	484	1.87%	25,941	100.00%	Republican hold
District 59	-	-	25,847	99.27%	189	0.73%	26,036	100.00%	Republican hold
District 60	-	-	23,806	74.87%	7,992	25.13%	31,798	100.00%	Republican hold
District 61	9,792	33.23%	19,622	66.59%	52	0.18%	29,466	100.00%	Republican hold
District 62	-	-	22,523	100.00%	-	-	22,523	100.00%	Republican hold
District 63	10,487	35.84%	18,771	64.16%	-	-	29,258	100.00%	Republican hold
District 64	18,799	97.67%	-	-	449	2.33%	19,248	100.00%	Democratic hold
District 65	16,112	97.84%	-	-	355	2.16%	16,467	100.00%	Democratic hold
District 66	13,526	81.32%	-	-	3,107	18.68%	16,633	100.00%	Democratic hold
District 67	10,308	35.69%	18,574	64.31%	-	-	28,882	100.00%	Republican hold
District 68	11,263	41.83%	15,628	58.05%	32	0.12%	26,923	100.00%	Republican hold
District 69	-	-	21,443	99.68%	69	0.32%	21,512	100.00%	Republican hold
District 70	10,266	37.68%	16,963	62.26%	18	0.07%	27,247	100.00%	Republican hold
District 71	21,834	98.90%	-	-	242	1.10%	22,076	100.00%	Democratic hold
District 72	12,279	43.45%	15,972	56.52%	6	0.02%	28,257	100.00%	Republican hold
District 73	22,107	98.17%	-	-	411	1.83%	22,518	100.00%	Democratic hold
District 74	22,624	99.36%	-	-	145	0.64%	22,769	100.00%	Democratic hold
District 75	10,894	37.97%	17,786	62.00%	9	0.03%	28,689	100.00%	Republican hold
District 76	33,628	82.77%	6,877	16.93%	124	0.31%	40,629	100.00%	Democratic hold
District 77	29,069	98.90%	-	-	323	1.10%	29,392	100.00%	Democratic hold
District 78	25,362	78.90%	-	-	6,782	21.10%	32,144	100.00%	Democratic hold
District 79	23,211	63.84%	13,105	36.04%	44	0.12%	36,360	100.00%	Democratic hold
District 80	26,250	98.19%	-	-	485	1.81%	26,735	100.00%	Democratic hold
District 81	17,270	60.49%	11,265	39.46%	14	0.05%	28,549	100.00%	Democratic hold
District 82	-	-	21,080	97.83%	467	2.17%	21,547	100.00%	Republican hold
District 83	-	-	26,596	98.79%	327	1.21%	26,923	100.00%	Republican hold
District 84	-	-	21,987	97.91%	470	2.09%	22,457	100.00%	Republican hold
District 85	12,837	46.52%	14,722	53.35%	35	0.13%	27,594	100.00%	Republican hold
District 86	11,142	35.43%	18,246	58.01%	2,063	6.56%	31,451	100.00%	Republican hold
District 87	8,554	31.98%	18,179	67.97%	12	0.04%	26,745	100.00%	Republican hold
District 88	11,312	38.88%	17,742	60.99%	37	0.13%	29,091	100.00%	Republican hold
District 89	9,055	31.78%	19,429	68.20%	5	0.02%	28,489	100.00%	Republican hold
District 90	14,387	97.92%	-	-	306	2.08%	14,693	100.00%	Democratic hold
District 91	17,780	60.87%	11,341	38.82%	90	0.31%	29,211	100.00%	Democratic hold
District 92	12,540	47.92%	13,605	51.99%	22	0.08%	26,167	100.00%	Republican gain
District 93	-	-	24,298	98.49%	372	1.51%	24,670	100.00%	Republican hold
District 94	16,721	52.63%	15,049	47.37%	-	-	31,770	100.00%	Democratic hold
District 95	23,020	100.00%	-	-	-	-	23,020	100.00%	Democratic hold
District 96	10,186	38.89%	16,000	61.09%	5	0.02%	26,191	100.00%	Republican hold
District 97	-	-	21,611	97.63%	524	2.37%	22,135	100.00%	Republican hold
District 98	-	-	25,592	98.39%	419	1.61%	26,011	100.00%	Republican hold
District 99	-	-	28,597	98.86%	331	1.14%	28,928	100.00%	Republican hold
Total	1,175,779	45.45%	1,337,291	51.69%	74,101	2.86%	2,587,171	100.00%	
