= Scott Jensen =

Scott Jensen may refer to:

- Scott Jensen (Wisconsin politician) (born 1960), member of the Wisconsin State Assembly
- Scott Jensen (Minnesota politician) (born 1954), physician and former Minnesota state senator
