= Peter Barca =

American politician (born 1955)

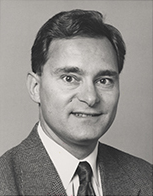
- Barca in 1993

14th Secretary of the Wisconsin Department of Revenue
- In office January 8, 2019 – April 9, 2024
- Governor: Tony Evers
- Preceded by: Richard Chandler
- Succeeded by: David Casey

Minority Leader of the Wisconsin State Assembly
- In office January 3, 2011 – September 30, 2017
- Preceded by: Jeff Fitzgerald
- Succeeded by: Gordon Hintz

Member of the Wisconsin State Assembly from the 64th district
- In office January 5, 2009 – January 8, 2019
- Preceded by: James Kreuser
- Succeeded by: Tip McGuire
- In office January 7, 1985 – May 4, 1993
- Preceded by: Joseph Wimmer
- Succeeded by: James Kreuser

Member of the U.S. House of Representatives from Wisconsin's 1st district
- In office May 4, 1993 – January 3, 1995 (Note: Barca's official service begins on the date of the special election, while he was not sworn in until June 8, 1993.)
- Preceded by: Les Aspin
- Succeeded by: Mark Neumann

Personal details
- Born: Peter William Barca; August 7, 1955 (age 71) Kenosha, Wisconsin, U.S.
- Party: Democratic
- Spouse: Kathleen Han (m. 1979)
- Children: 2
- Education: University of Wisconsin, Milwaukee (BA); Harvard University; University of Wisconsin, Madison (MA)
- Website: Campaign website

Peter William Barca (born August 7, 1955) is an American Democratic politician from Kenosha, Wisconsin. He was the 14th secretary of the Wisconsin Department of Revenue (2019–2024) in the administration of Governor Tony Evers. He was a candidate for U.S. House of Representatives in Wisconsin's 1st congressional district in 2024 losing to incumbent Bryan Steil; he previously represented the district during the 103rd Congress (1993–1995).

Barca also served nine terms in the Wisconsin State Assembly, covering the years 1985 through 1993 and 2009 through 2019, and was elected Democratic floor leader from 2011 through 2017. He represented the north side of the city of Kenosha and part of Somers. Between his stints in the Assembly, he also served as the Midwest Regional Administrator of the U.S. Small Business Administration during the presidency of Bill Clinton.

== Early life ==
Barca was born in Kenosha, Wisconsin, on August 7, 1955, and spent his entire youth in the Kenosha area. He graduated from Kenosha's Mary D. Bradford High School in 1973 and went on to earn his bachelor's degree from the University of Wisconsin–Milwaukee in 1977.

After earning his bachelor's degree, he returned to Kenosha and started his career as a teacher for emotionally disturbed children and a team leader for students with special needs, Barca went on to become the director of the Friendship Camp, a camp for children with disabilities.

Barca's work as a teacher led to involvement with the teachers' union and local politics; he soon became active in the Democratic Party of Wisconsin and was elected chairman of the Kenosha County Democratic Party in 1979. He resigned from the office a year later to attend Harvard Graduate School. He ultimately returned to Wisconsin and completed his M.A. in public administration and educational administration from the University of Wisconsin–Madison in 1983. After returning to Kenosha, he was employed at the Kenosha Achievement Center and worked in job placement.

== Career ==
=== State legislature ===
Barca made his first run for public office in 1984. That year, Kenosha's north side state representative, Joseph Andrea, announced that he would run for Wisconsin Senate that fall, creating an open seat in the recently redrawn 64th Assembly district. (Note: Although on paper Barca succeeded Joseph Wimmer, it's more accurate in the narrative to describe him as succeeding Joseph Andrea--the boundaries of the district 64 which Barca won in 1984 (northern Kenosha & Somers) were essentially identical to the boundaries of the district 24 that Andrea had represented in the 1983 term. The 1983 district numbers were just a historical oddity caused by a court-ordered redistricting plan.) Barca was one of eight candidates who sought the Democratic nomination in that primary, including former county supervisor David Holtze, former city councilmember Gerald Bellow, former school board member Mark Lindas, former UAW local leader Frank Perone, and city police and fire commission member Marlene Mura. Barca prevailed over the divided field with 34% of the vote. At the time of the primary, Barca and others credited his victory to a strong campaign organization. Barca also acknowledged the popularity of his family name, due to his father's decades operating popular Kenosha restaurants. Barca went on to win the general election with nearly 80% of the vote in the heavily Democratic district.

During his initial tenure in the State Capitol, Barca authored and passed a wide variety of proposals covering issues such as economic development, protection for seniors and the disabled, education, employment and job training, criminal justice, and environmental protection. He also worked closely with the Kenosha delegation to help pass legislation that led to the creation of the Lakeview Corporate Park. Barca also chaired several special legislative committees that led to Wisconsin’s nationally recognized welfare reform program, implemented the award-winning 'one stop shop' employment and training systems, and developed the roadmap for rail services between Kenosha and Milwaukee.

After winning his fourth term in 1990, Barca was elected to a party leadership position in the Assembly, serving as majority caucus chair for the 1991 legislative term. He was re-elected to that leadership position in the 1993 term, but resigned from the Assembly after his election to the U.S. House of Representatives that May.

=== U.S. Congress ===
In early 1993, newly inaugurated President Bill Clinton appointed Wisconsin U.S. representative Les Aspin as United States Secretary of Defense. Aspin therefore had to resign his seat in Wisconsin's 1st congressional district and a special election was called to fill the balance of his term in the 103rd United States Congress. Barca was one of three incumbent state representatives who ran for the Democratic nomination in the special election, the others being Jeffrey A. Neubauer of Racine and Wayne W. Wood of Janesville. Barca won the primary with 48% of the vote, assisted by strong turnout from his native Kenosha County, where he won the support of 80% of Democratic primary voters.

In the general election, Barca faced Republican Mark Neumann, who had been Aspin's opponent in the 1992 congressional election. Barca won by only 675 votes, mainly due to a weak showing in Racine. Neumann, in turn, defeated Barca in the regular 1994 election 17 months later, winning by a similarly narrow margin of just 1,120 votes.

=== Post-congressional career ===
After Barca narrowly lost his re-election bid, President Clinton appointed him to serve as Midwest Regional Administrator to the U.S. Small Business Administration. He also served as National Ombudsman to the SBA. Barca was also leader of the National Regulatory Fairness Program, an initiative which included more than fifty company presidents throughout the country aimed at making regulatory enforcement small business friendly. He later went on to become Vice President and then President of Aurora Associates International, an international project management company.

=== Return to politics ===
In November 2008, after a 14-year absence, Barca was elected to represent the 64th Assembly district once again. He was again chosen to be Majority Caucus Chairperson, and served as co-chair of the Joint Legislative Audit Committee, and chair of the Partnership for a Stronger Economy.

As chair of the Partnership for a Stronger Economy, Barca traveled the state meeting with various small businesses owners and economic development professionals to craft an economic plan for Wisconsin. The Partnership led the way in helping to pass over 50 economic initiatives in the 2009–10 legislative session, including the Small Business Capital Access Program and the Entrepreneurial Assistance Grant Program, both authored by Barca. During this first session back in the Assembly, he also authored legislation to ban text messaging while driving in Wisconsin.

In the 2010 midterm elections, Republicans won complete control of government in Wisconsin. Following the election, Barca was elected by his colleagues to serve as Assembly Democratic Leader in the 100th Wisconsin Legislature. He rose to national prominence shortly after the start of that legislative term, as a leader in the opposition against new Governor Scott Walker's "budget repair" bill. Democrats derided the legislation as a historic rollback to union rights in Wisconsin, stripping public employee unions of their right to collective bargaining. The bill immediately resulted in mass protests on the Wisconsin State Capitol grounds, which ultimately lasted for nearly four months. In an attempt to slow down the bill, 14 state senate Democrats fled the state in order to deny a quorum to the state senate. Barca led the opposition in the Assembly, culminating in his coordination of a 60 hour floor debate in which members of the Democratic caucus highlighted their many complaints about the legislation. Barca then led Assembly Democrats in protesting the Republicans' alleged violation of open meetings laws after they stripped out budgetary items from the bill in order to bypass the quorum issue and pass the bill through the Senate.

He remained leader of the Democratic minority until September 2017. Officially, he resigned from leadership to focus more attention on his own constituency, but his resignation was also at least partly an acknowledgement of discontent within the caucus—particularly among new members of the legislature—over his support for the Foxconn in Wisconsin funding package.

=== Department of Revenue ===
Following the 2018 election, Barca was among the first nominees for cabinet positions under new governor Tony Evers. Barca was nominated for secretary of the Wisconsin Department of Revenue on January 7, 2019, and resigned his Assembly seat the next day. Although his Senate confirmation wasn't completed until the fall, he was able to begin work immediately as secretary-designee. The Senate Committee on Agriculture, Revenue and Financial Institutions unanimously approved his nomination on February 22, 2019, and the full Senate confirmed his appointment on October 8, 2019.

During the COVID-19 pandemic in 2020, Barca's Department of Revenue played an important role in facilitating business and farm loans in Wisconsin through the federal CARES Act, and informing the public about how to obtain federal financial support during the pandemic.

Barca and the Department of Revenue were also important to major bipartisan legislation advanced during the 2023 term, including the repeal of Wisconsin's unique personal property tax and the compromise which unlocked badly needed shared revenue for Wisconsin's county and municipal governments.

In the summer of 2023, Barca was named president of the board of trustees of the Federation of Tax Administrators, a national organization that provides research, training, and other support to state and local tax administrators.

On March 28, 2024, Barca announced he would resign as secretary of the Department of Revenue on April 9. At the same time, Barca also publicly expressed interest in running for Congress again in Wisconsin's 1st congressional district.

=== 2024 campaign ===
On April 18, 2024, Barca told the Milwaukee Journal Sentinel that he plans to run for the 1st congressional district seat in 2024, challenging incumbent Bryan Steil. He announced his campaign later that day on Twitter, then formally launched his campaign at the Apple Holler apple orchard in Racine County.

== Personal life and family ==
Barca is a son of Peter Barca and his wife Joyce (née Ashmus). The elder Peter Barca was an Italian American immigrant, who emigrated to Kenosha at age 18. After becoming established in Kenosha, he operated Barca Belting Co., a conveyor belt distributor, and then owned two popular Kenosha restaurants—the Maywood and the Flamingo.

Barca married Kathleen Mary Han from North Fond du Lac, Wisconsin, in 1979. They still reside in Kenosha and have two adult children.

The former company of Peter Barca was registered in the offshore tax haven of Barbados.

== Electoral history ==
=== Wisconsin Assembly (1984–1992) ===
Year	Election	Date	Elected				Defeated				Total	Plurality
1984	Primary	Sep. 11	Peter W. Barca	Democratic	3,212	33.94%	Marlene Mura	Dem.	1,898	20.06%	9,463	1,314
1984	Primary	Sep. 11	Peter W. Barca	Democratic	3,212	33.94%	David D. Holtze Sr.	Dem.	1,328	14.03%	9,463	1,314
1984	Primary	Sep. 11	Peter W. Barca	Democratic	3,212	33.94%	Mark C. Lindas	Dem.	1,110	11.73%	9,463	1,314
1984	Primary	Sep. 11	Peter W. Barca	Democratic	3,212	33.94%	Gerald F. Bellow	Dem.	903	9.54%	9,463	1,314
1984	Primary	Sep. 11	Peter W. Barca	Democratic	3,212	33.94%	Frank J. Perone	Dem.	471	4.98%	9,463	1,314
1984	Primary	Sep. 11	Peter W. Barca	Democratic	3,212	33.94%	Charles E. Waller	Dem.	470	4.97%	9,463	1,314
1984	Primary	Sep. 11	Peter W. Barca	Democratic	3,212	33.94%	Kenneth A. Slade	Dem.	71	0.75%	9,463	1,314
1984	General	Nov. 6	Peter W. Barca	Democratic	14,745	78.43%	Gary T. Adelsen	Rep.	3,741	19.90%	18,801	11,004
1984	General	Nov. 6	Peter W. Barca	Democratic	14,745	78.43%	Tony Michetti	Con.	315	1.68%	18,801	11,004
1986	General	Nov. 4	Peter W. Barca (inc)	Democratic	9,439	82.20%	Timothy G. Blackmon	Rep.	2,044	17.80%	11,483	7,395
1988	General	Nov. 8	Peter W. Barca (inc)	Democratic	14,126	100.0%	--unopposed--				14,126	14,126
1990	General	Nov. 6	Peter W. Barca (inc)	Democratic	7,389	74.20%	Michael F. Phebus	Rep.	2,569	25.80%	9,958	4,820
1992	General	Nov. 3	Peter W. Barca (inc)	Democratic	15,730	100.0%	--unopposed--				15,730	15,730

=== U.S. House of Representatives (1993, 1994) ===
Year	Election	Date	Elected				Defeated				Total	Plurality
1993	Special; Primary	Apr. 6	Peter W. Barca	Democratic	31,073	48.67%	Jeffrey A. Neubauer	Dem.	21,610	33.85%	63,845	9,463
1993	Special; Primary	Apr. 6	Peter W. Barca	Democratic	31,073	48.67%	Wayne W. Wood	Dem.	8,254	12.93%	63,845	9,463
1993	Special; Primary	Apr. 6	Peter W. Barca	Democratic	31,073	48.67%	Jeffrey C. Thomas	Dem.	1,814	2.84%	63,845	9,463
1993	Special; Primary	Apr. 6	Peter W. Barca	Democratic	31,073	48.67%	Samuel Platts	Dem.	1,094	1.71%	63,845	9,463
1993	Special	May 4	Peter W. Barca	Democratic	55,605	49.90%	Mark W. Neumann	Rep.	54,930	49.29%	111,440	675
1993	Special	May 4	Peter W. Barca	Democratic	55,605	49.90%	Edward J. Kozak	Lib.	375	0.34%	111,440	675
1993	Special	May 4	Peter W. Barca	Democratic	55,605	49.90%	Gary W. Thompson	Ind.	327	0.29%	111,440	675
1993	Special	May 4	Peter W. Barca	Democratic	55,605	49.90%	Karl Huebner	Ind.	203	0.18%	111,440	675
1994	General	Nov. 8	Mark W. Neumann	Republican	83,937	49.42%	Peter W. Barca (inc)	Dem.	82,817	48.76%	169,839	1,120
1994	General	Nov. 8	Mark W. Neumann	Republican	83,937	49.42%	Edward J. Kozak	Lib.	3,085	1.82%	169,839	1,120

=== Wisconsin Assembly (2008–2018) ===
Year	Election	Date	Elected				Defeated				Total	Plurality
2008	Primary	Sep. 9	Peter W. Barca	Democratic	3,134	74.51%	Jim Huff	Dem.	928	22.06%	4,206	2,206
2008	Primary	Sep. 9	Peter W. Barca	Democratic	3,134	74.51%	Michael J. Orth	Dem.	122	2.90%	4,206	2,206
2008	General	Nov. 4	Peter W. Barca	Democratic	19,739	98.71%	--unopposed--				19,996	19,482
2010	General	Nov. 2	Peter W. Barca (inc)	Democratic	9,667	84.17%	Daane Hoffman	Lib.	1,774	15.45%	11,485	7,893
2012	General	Nov. 6	Peter W. Barca (inc)	Democratic	20,264	96.84%	--unopposed--				20,926	19,602
2014	General	Nov. 4	Peter W. Barca (inc)	Democratic	13,887	95.54%	--unopposed--				14,536	13,238
2016	General	Nov. 8	Peter W. Barca (inc)	Democratic	18,799	97.67%	--unopposed--				19,248	18,350
2018	General	Nov. 6	Peter W. Barca (inc)	Democratic	16,773	78.32%	Thomas Harland	Con.	4,441	20.74%	21,416	12,332

=== U.S. House of Representatives (2024) ===
Year	Election	Date	Elected				Defeated				Total	Plurality
2024	General	Nov. 5	Bryan Steil (inc.)	Republican	212,515	54.01%	Peter W. Barca	Dem.	172,402	43.81%	393,493	180,978
2024	General	Nov. 5	Bryan Steil (inc.)	Republican	212,515	54.01%	Chester Todd Jr.	Grn.	8,191	2.08%	393,493	180,978

== Notes ==
U.S. House of Representatives
Preceded by Les Aspin	Member of the U.S. House of Representatives from Wisconsin's 1st congressional district 1993–1995	Succeeded by Mark Neumann
Wisconsin State Assembly
Preceded by Jeff Fitzgerald	Minority Leader of the Wisconsin State Assembly; 2011–2017	Succeeded by Gordon Hintz
U.S. order of precedence (ceremonial)
Preceded by Harold Vernon Froehlich as Former U.S. Representative	Order of precedence of the United States as Former U.S. Representative	Succeeded by Ernie Konnyu as Former U.S. Representative
