= James Stewart (Wisconsin politician) =

20th century American politician

James M. Stewart

Member of the Wisconsin State Assembly from the 32nd district
- In office January 3, 1983 – January 7, 1985
- Preceded by: Dismas Becker
- Succeeded by: Joseph Wimmer

Personal details
- Born: March 20, 1936 Kilmarnock, Scotland, UK
- Died: November 26, 2021 (aged 85) AngelsGrace Hospice Care, Oconomowoc, Wisconsin, U.S.
- Resting place: Resurrection Cemetery, Madison, Wisconsin
- Party: Republican
- Spouse: Claire Adele Hunold (m. 1959–2021)
- Children: 5
- Education: University of Wisconsin–Madison (B.S.); University of Wisconsin–Whitewater (M.A., M.S.)

Military service
- Allegiance: United States
- Branch/service: United States Army
- Years of service: 1959–1979
- Rank: Lt. Colonel, USA
- Battles/wars: Vietnam War
- Awards: Bronze Star

James McBride "Jim" Stewart (March 20, 1936 – November 26, 2021) was a Scottish American immigrant, U.S. Army officer, and Republican politician from Whitewater, Wisconsin. He served one term in the Wisconsin State Assembly, representing Wisconsin's 32nd Assembly district during the 1983–1984 term. He also served over 40 years on the Whitewater School Board.

== Early life and military career ==
James Stewart was born in Kilmarnock, Scotland, in 1936. His childhood was largely influenced by witnessing the effects of World War II in Scotland. After the war, he emigrated to the United States with his parents and sister, settling in Madison, Wisconsin, in 1950. Stewart graduated from Edgewood High School of the Sacred Heart, a private Catholic school in Madison, and went on to earn his bachelor's degree from the University of Wisconsin–Madison in 1959.

While in college, Stewart enrolled in the Reserve Officers' Training Corps, and he was commissioned as a second lieutenant in the United States Army Transportation Corps immediately after graduation. He spent the next 20 years as a career Army officer. During his service, his family often accompanied him to different bases, but he went unaccompanied for a tour in South Korea and two tours in Vietnam, where he earned a Bronze Star Medal with a "V" device.

After his service in Vietnam, he was assigned to the Military Science program at University of Wisconsin–Whitewater, where he obtained an M.A. degree in 1975 and a M.S. degree in 1979. In 1979, he retired from military service with the rank of lieutenant colonel.

He settled down permanently in Whitewater, Wisconsin. He was hired as assistant registrar at the University of Wisconsin–Whitewater, where he worked until his retirement in 2001.

== Political career ==
In 1981, he won his first public office when he was elected to the Whitewater School Board. The following year, after a dramatic redistricting of the state legislature, he resided in an Assembly district which had no incumbent state representative living within its boundaries. He declared his candidacy for the 32nd state Assembly district seat in 1982. He faced no opposition in the Republican Party primary, and went on to a narrow win in the general election, receiving 50.8% of the vote over Democrat Joy Warfield.

The legislature went through another redistricting in 1983, and Stewart chose not to run for another term in the new district. Stewart remained active in local politics and was a member of the Whitewater school board until his death, serving more than 40 years.

== Personal life and family ==
James Stewart was one of two children born to William Stewart and his wife Agnes (née Manson).

James Stewart married Claire Hunold on August 29, 1959, at Blessed Sacrament Catholic Church in Madison. They had met while both were students at Edgewood High School. They had five children together and were married for 62 years before his death in 2021.

He died at AngelsGrace Hospice Care in Oconomowoc, Wisconsin, on November 26, 2021. He was survived by his wife and all five of their children, as well as 14 grandchildren and two great-grandchildren.

== Electoral history ==
=== Wisconsin Assembly (1982) ===
Wisconsin Senate, 32nd District Election, 1982
Party	Candidate	Votes	%	±%
General Election, November 2, 1982
Republican	James M. Stewart	7,098	50.77%	
Democratic	Joy Warfield	6,761	48.36%	
Libertarian	Jodine V. Gill	122	0.87%	
Plurality		337	2.41%	
Total votes		13,981	100.0%	
Republican gain from Democratic				

Wisconsin State Assembly
Preceded by Dismas Becker	Member of the Wisconsin State Assembly from the 32nd district January 3, 1983 – January 7, 1985	Succeeded by Joseph Wimmer
