= Michael O. Wilder =

American politician

Michael O. Wilder (born 1941) is a former member of the Wisconsin State Assembly.

== Biography ==
Wilder was born on November 10, 1941, in Park Falls, Wisconsin. He is married with two children.

== Career ==
Wilder was first elected to the Assembly in 1992. Previously, he was a Chippewa County, Wisconsin supervisor from 1972 to 1975. He is a Democrat.
