= Brad Zweck =

American politician

Brad Zweck spent three terms as a Democratic member of the Wisconsin State Assembly from the 86th district (portions of Marathon, Shawano and Waupaca counties).

== Background ==
Zweck was born on August 16, 1958, in Wausau, Wisconsin. He attended Grambling State University in Louisiana and the University of Wisconsin-Marathon County, eventually earning a Journalism degree from the University of Wisconsin-Eau Claire.

== Political career ==
Zweck was first elected a member of the Wisconsin State Assembly in 1986 and was twice re-elected, in 1990 defeating former Iran hostage Kevin J. Hermening, the Republican nominee. He left the Assembly in 1991 to go to work for Wausau Insurance, and was succeeded by fellow Democrat Thomas J. Springer, a former intern in Zweck's office.

== After the Assembly ==
From 1992 to 2009, Zweck worked in public relations and as a lobbyist for Wausau Insurance. Since 2010, he has also been the executive director of the UW Wausau Campus Foundation.

== Private life ==
Zweck is married with two sons.
