= Mordecai Lee =

American politician (born 1948)

Mordecai Lee (born August 27, 1948) is a former member of the Wisconsin State Assembly and Wisconsin State Senate.

== Biography ==
Lee was born on August 27, 1948, in Milwaukee, Wisconsin. He is a graduate of the University of Wisconsin–Madison and Syracuse University. Currently, he is a member of the faculty of the University of Wisconsin–Milwaukee. He has also been a member of the faculty of the University of Wisconsin-Parkside. In 1990, he was named Executive Director of the Milwaukee Jewish Council for Community Relations.

== Political career ==
Before being elected to public office, Lee was a legislative assistant for U.S. Representative Henry S. Reuss. Lee was elected to the Wisconsin State Assembly in 1976 and was elected to the Wisconsin State Senate in 1982, where he served from 1983 to 1989. He was succeeded in his Senate seat by Tom Barrett. Lee is a Democrat, and frequently provides election analysis and commentary for many of Milwaukee's television and radio stations.
