= Clifton, Pierce County, Wisconsin =

Clifton, Wisconsin
- Town
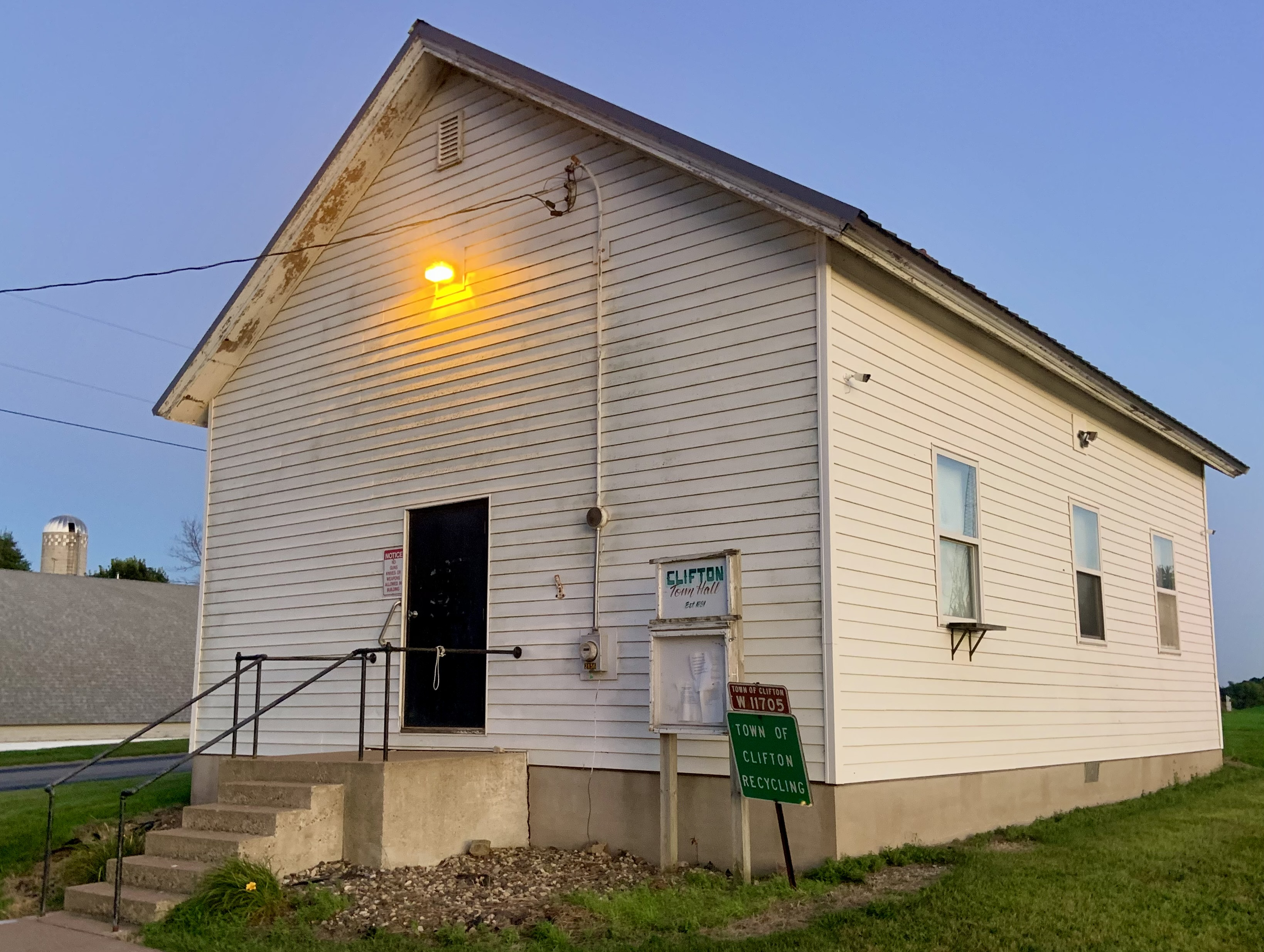
- Town hall

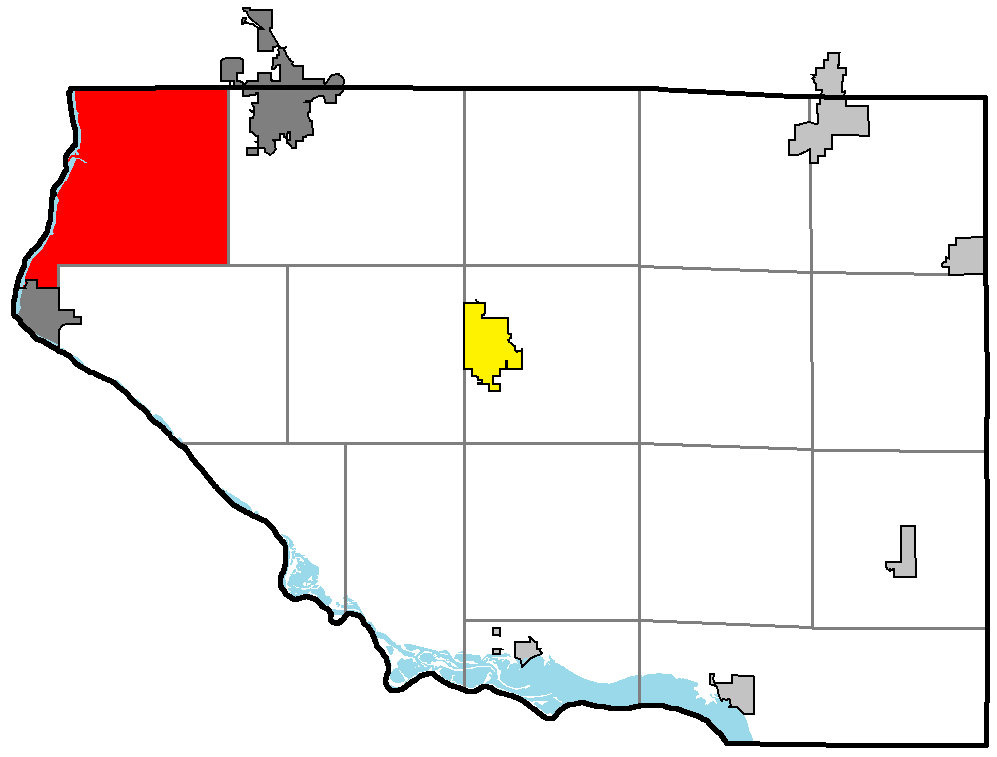
- Location of Clifton, within Pierce County

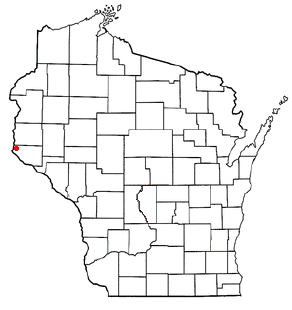
- Location of Clifton, Wisconsin
- Coordinates: 44°49′5″N 92°44′8″W
- Country: United States
- State: Wisconsin
- County: Pierce

Area
  - Total: 35.6 sq mi (92.1 km^{2})
  - Land: 34.4 sq mi (89.0 km^{2})
  - Water: 1.2 sq mi (3.1 km^{2})
- Elevation: 961 ft (293 m)

Population (2020)
  - Total: 2,177
  - Density: 63.4/sq mi (24.5/km^{2})
- Time zone: UTC-6 (Central (CST))
  - Summer (DST): UTC-5 (CDT)
- Area codes: 715 & 534
- FIPS code: 55-15575
- GNIS feature ID: 1582981

Clifton is a town in Pierce County, Wisconsin, United States. The population was 2,177 at the 2020 census.

== Geography ==
According to the United States Census Bureau, the town has a total area of 35.6 square miles (92.1 km^{2}), of which 34.3 square miles (89.0 km^{2}) is land and 1.2 square miles (3.1 km^{2}) (3.40%) is water.

== Demographics ==
As of the census of 2000, there were 1,657 people, 543 households, and 457 families residing in the town. The population density was 48.2 inhabitants per square mile (18.6/km^{2}). There were 592 housing units at an average density of 17.2 per square mile (6.6/km^{2}). The racial makeup of the town was 99.09% White, 0.18% African American, 0.24% Native American, 0.30% Asian, 0.12% from other races, and 0.06% from two or more races. Hispanic or Latino of any race were 0.42% of the population.

There were 543 households, out of which 45.3% had children under the age of 18 living with them, 78.3% were married couples living together, 3.1% had a female householder with no husband present, and 15.8% were non-families. 11.8% of all households were made up of individuals, and 3.1% had someone living alone who was 65 years of age or older. The average household size was 3.05 and the average family size was 3.33.

In the town, the population was spread out, with 30.9% under the age of 18, 6.8% from 18 to 24, 31.3% from 25 to 44, 25.3% from 45 to 64, and 5.7% who were 65 years of age or older. The median age was 36 years. For every 100 females, there were 111.4 males. For every 100 females age 18 and over, there were 111.3 males.

The median income for a household in the town was $71,810, and the median income for a family was $75,836. Males had a median income of $48,355 versus $32,257 for females. The per capita income for the town was $25,352. About 0.4% of families and 1.2% of the population were below the poverty line, including 0.8% of those under age 18 and none of those age 65 or over.
