= Joseph Wimmer =

20th century American politician and judge

The Honorable Joseph E. Wimmer

Wisconsin Circuit Court Judge for the Waukesha Circuit, Branch 1
- In office October 1, 1991 – February 29, 2000
- Appointed by: Tommy Thompson
- Preceded by: Harry G. Snyder
- Succeeded by: Michael O. Bohren

Member of the Wisconsin State Assembly
- In office January 7, 1985 – October 1, 1991
- Preceded by: James M. Stewart
- Succeeded by: Scott R. Jensen
- Constituency: 32nd district
- In office January 3, 1983 – January 7, 1985
- Preceded by: Joseph F. Andrea
- Succeeded by: Peter W. Barca
- Constituency: 64th district

Personal details
- Born: July 21, 1934 (age 92) Watertown, Wisconsin, U.S.
- Party: Republican
- Spouse: Sue Ann Chase (m. 1957)
- Children: 4
- Education: University of Wisconsin-Madison (B.B.A.); University of Wisconsin Law School (LL.B.)
- Profession: attorney, politician, judge

Military service
- Allegiance: United States
- Branch/service: United States Army
- Years of service: 1954–1956

Joseph E. Wimmer (born July 21, 1934) is a retired American judge and politician. He served 9 years as a Wisconsin circuit court judge in Waukesha County after representing the county for 8 years in the Wisconsin State Assembly as a Republican.

== Early life and education ==
Born in Watertown, Wisconsin, Wimmer graduated from Watertown High School and enlisted in the United States Army. He served two years before returning to private life. He went on to attend the University of Wisconsin-Madison, where he received his bachelor's degree in accounting in 1959, and continued his education at the University of Wisconsin Law School, earning his LL.B. in 1961.

== Career ==
Wimmer went to work as an attorney, and, in 1964, was hired as an assistant district attorney in Waukesha County. He served three years, and returned to private practice, though returned to public service in 1968 when he was hired as assistant city attorney of Muskego under John P. Buckley. He continued as assistant city attorney until 1973. Over the next several years, he was a partner in the firm Wimmer, Evans & Vollmer.

Wimmer made his first attempt at elected office in 1980, running on the Republican ticket to challenge incumbent state senator Lynn Adelman. Despite a strong Republican year at the top of the state ticket, with presidential candidate Ronald Reagan winning the state by more than 100,000 votes, state Republicans ran well behind Reagan, and Wimmer fell far short of Adelman, who took 57% of the vote in the 28th State Senate district.

Wimmer ran again in 1982, running instead for the Wisconsin State Assembly in the newly redrawn 64th Assembly district. The 1981–1982 redistricting process had failed to produce a map that could pass the Legislature and win the signature of the Governor. As a result, a panel of federal judges had imposed their own redistricting on the state, scrambling the State Assembly districts, with nearly all incumbents being drawn out of their previous districts. Southeast Waukesha, where Wimmer lived, had previously been part of the 83rd Assembly district, which also included the neighboring municipalities of New Berlin, Genesee, and Vernon. That district had been represented in the 1981–1982 session by John C. Shabaz of New Berlin. The 1982 redistricting split New Berlin into a separate district, and Wimmer was able to run in the new 64th district without an incumbent on the ballot. In the general election, Wimmer defeated Democrat Mary Carlson. The 1983–1984 session passed a redistricting law to replace the court-imposed map, and Wimmer went on to win election four more times in the redrawn 32nd Assembly district.

In 1991, Governor Tommy Thompson appointed Wimmer as Wisconsin circuit court judge in Waukesha County's Branch 1 seat, vacated by the elevation of Judge Harry G. Snyder to the Wisconsin Court of Appeals. In April 1992, Judge Wimmer won election to a full six-year term, and he was reelected in 1998. In late 1999, he announced he would retire in the early part of 2000. He was succeeded by Judge Michael O. Bohren.

Wisconsin State Assembly
Preceded by Joseph F. Andrea	Member of the Wisconsin State Assembly from the 64th district January 3, 1983 – January 7, 1985	Succeeded by Peter W. Barca
Preceded by James M. Stewart	Member of the Wisconsin State Assembly from the 32nd district January 7, 1985 – September 6, 1991	Succeeded by Scott R. Jensen
Legal offices
Preceded by Harry G. Snyder	Wisconsin Circuit Court Judge for the Waukesha Circuit, Branch 1 September 6, 1991 – February 29, 2000	Succeeded by Michael O. Bohren
