= Timothy Weeden =

American politician

Timothy L Weeden (born November 13, 1951) is a Wisconsin politician, legislator, and realtor.

Born in Beloit, Wisconsin, Weeden graduated from Beloit Memorial High School. He received a bachelor's degree in political science from Wheaton College in 1973 and then a masters in business administration from the University of Wisconsin–Whitewater. From 1982 to 1983, Weeden served on the Beloit Board of Education. He was elected to the Wisconsin State Assembly as a Republican in 1985 and then to the Wisconsin State Senate in 1987, in a special election, serving until 1999 when he retired from the Wisconsin Legislature. As of 2008, Weeden worked for Hendricks Group in Beloit as the director of governmental affairs.
