= Rosemary Potter =

American politician

Rosemary Potter is a former member of the Wisconsin State Assembly.

== Biography ==
Potter was born on April 15, 1952, in Milwaukee, Wisconsin. She graduated from Bay View High School and the University of Wisconsin–Milwaukee before serving as an intern with the United Nations. Potter was later a member of the faculty at Milwaukee Area Technical College, Alverno College and the University of Wisconsin–Milwaukee and spent time in Italy, India, Argentina, Uruguay, Brazil, Chile and Japan.

== Political career ==
Potter was first elected to the Assembly in a special election in 1989. In 1993, she became the first woman to serve as Majority Caucus Chairperson in Wisconsin. She later became Minority Caucus Chairperson in 1995 and 1997. Potter is a Democrat.
