= Charles Coleman (politician) =

American politician

Charles W. Coleman (born 7 August 1932) is an American former politician who served as a member of the Wisconsin State Assembly.

Coleman was born in Milwaukee, Wisconsin. He graduated from high school in Elkhorn, Wisconsin in 1950, as well as the University of Wisconsin–Madison (B.B.A., 1954; M.S., 1959). During the Korean War, he served in the United States Army from 1954 to 1956. Coleman has six children.

Coleman was first elected to the Assembly in 1982. Additionally, he was a member of the Whitewater, Wisconsin Unified District Public School Board from 1978 to 1983 and Chairman of the Walworth County, Wisconsin Republican Party.
