= David A. Brandemuehl =

American politician (1931–2006)

David A. Brandemuehl (December 7, 1931 – September 26, 2006) was a member of the Wisconsin State Assembly.

== Biography ==
Brandemuehl was born on December 7, 1931, in Mount Hope, Wisconsin. Later, he moved with his family to Fennimore, Wisconsin. After graduating from high school, he attended the University of Wisconsin–Madison. During the Korean War, Brandemuehl served in the United States Air Force.

In 1958, Brandemuehl married Elizabeth Cretney. They had four children. Elizabeth died in 1997. In 2004, Brandemuehl married LaRue Oetker. Brandemuehl died on September 26, 2006.

== Career ==
Brandemuehl was first elected to the Assembly in 1986 and remained a member until 2001. Additionally, he was a member of the Fennimore Community School Board from 1967 to 1987. Brandemuehl was a Republican.
