= Thomas J. Springer =

American politician (born 1968)

Personal details
- Born: April 25, 1968 (age 58) Mosinee, Wisconsin, U.S.
- Party: Democratic
- Education: University of Wisconsin–Madison
- Occupation: Politician

Thomas J. Springer (born April 25, 1968) is an American politician and a former member of the Wisconsin State Assembly. Springer was born on April 25, 1968, in Mosinee, Wisconsin. He graduated from the University of Wisconsin–Madison. Springer was first elected to the Assembly in a special election in 1991. He is a Democrat.
