= Susan Bowers Vergeront =

American politician

Susan Bowers Vergeront is a former member of the Wisconsin State Assembly.

== Biography ==
Vergeront was born Susan Bowers on November 30, 1945, in Milwaukee, Wisconsin, the daughter of Mary Oberly Bowers and A. William Bowers. She graduated from Lincoln High School in Manitowoc, Wisconsin and the University of Wisconsin–Madison. Vergeront was married to David John Vergeront and she has three grown children and 6 grandchildren.

== Career ==
Vergeront was a member of the Grafton, Wisconsin Board of Education from 1981 to 1987. She was first elected to the Assembly in 1984. She is a Republican.

In June 2020, Susan Vergeront endorsed Joe Biden, a Democrat, for president. According to Vergeront, "Since I left the legislature in 1994, the Republican party has become more greedy and more vicious and ruthless than I ever imagined it could be. I still call myself a Republican because I believe in the Republican ideals of limited government, freedom of the individual, seeking public good...I call myself a Republican in the traditional sense of the Grand Old Party. I'm so disappointed, sometimes to tears, at where our country has come"
