= Scott Jensen (Wisconsin politician) =

American politician (born 1960)

74th Speaker of the Wisconsin State Assembly
- In office November 4, 1997 – January 6, 2003
- Preceded by: Ben Brancel
- Succeeded by: John Gard

Member of the Wisconsin State Assembly
- In office January 6, 2003 – March 21, 2006
- Preceded by: Marc C. Duff
- Succeeded by: Rich Zipperer
- Constituency: 98th Assembly district
- In office January 20, 1992 – January 6, 2003
- Preceded by: Joseph Wimmer
- Succeeded by: Thomas Lothian
- Constituency: 32nd Assembly district

Personal details
- Born: August 24, 1960 (age 65) Waukesha, Wisconsin, U.S.
- Party: Republican
- Spouse: Julie Ann Woyak (m. 1992)
- Children: 3
- Education: Drake University (B.A.); Harvard Kennedy School (M.P.P.)
- Profession: Public relations

Scott Richard Jensen (born August 24, 1960) is an American public relations professional and Republican politician from Waukesha, Wisconsin. He was the 74th speaker of the Wisconsin State Assembly (1997–2003), and served a total of 14 years in the Assembly (1992–2006). Prior to his years in the Assembly, he served as chief of staff to Wisconsin governor Tommy Thompson.

Jensen was one of several state legislators charged in a 2002 scandal in which public employees were found to have been performing campaign work; Jensen eventually reached a settlement to avoid prosecution. Since leaving public office, he has worked as a senior advisor to the American Federation for Children, the largest advocacy organization in the country for school choice programs.

== Early life ==
Born in Waukesha, Wisconsin, Jensen attended Mukwonago High School and graduated from Drake University in 1982. He received a master's degree in public policy from Harvard University's Kennedy School of Government in 1984.

After receiving his graduate degree, Jensen worked in public relations, working as Director of Government Relations for Wisconsin Manufacturers and Commerce from 1984 to 1987.

== Career ==
Jensen began in politics by working as the staff director of the Wisconsin Assembly's Republican caucus from 1987 to 1990, serving under Assembly minority leader David Prosser Jr. While there, he ran the first campaign of John Gard for the Wisconsin Assembly in 1987. Jensen then worked as chief of staff for Wisconsin governor Tommy Thompson from 1990 to 1992.

=== Public office ===
In 1992, Jensen was elected to the Wisconsin State Assembly, representing the 32nd district, in a special election. In the special election primary in December 1991, Jensen barely defeated fellow Republican Donald Wilson, 1474 to 1436. He won the general special election against Democrat Shirley Wheelter in January 1992 by a two-to-one margin. Jensen was unopposed in the general election that year, and won by wide margins in elections in 1994, 1996, 1998, and 2000. In 2002, due to redistricting, Jensen was re-elected to the Assembly representing the 98th district, where he was unopposed in 2004.

Jensen served in the Assembly until 2006. Jensen served as majority leader from 1994 to 1995 and speaker from 1995 to 2002.

In the fall of 2002, Jensen and other legislative leaders were ensnared in a caucus scandal. He was charged with three felonies and one misdemeanor, including misconduct in public office and using state resources for campaigns. He was found guilty on all counts and sentenced to 15 months in prison. He appealed, and a new trial was ordered. He settled on a plea deal, whereby the felony charges were dropped in exchange for a plea of no contest on the misdemeanor charge. He served no jail time.

=== Current activities ===
Jensen works in the private sector with the Alliance for School Choice and Chartwell Strategic Advisors.

== Personal life and family ==
Scott Jensen married Julie Ann Woyak, of Wausau, on June 20, 1992, at St. Patrick's Catholic Church in Madison. They now reside in Brookfield, Wisconsin, and have three adult children.

Wisconsin State Assembly
| Preceded by Joseph Wimmer | Member of the Wisconsin State Assembly from the 32nd district January 20, 1992 – January 6, 2003 | Succeeded by Thomas Lothian |
| Preceded by Marc C. Duff | Member of the Wisconsin State Assembly from the 98th district January 6, 2003 – March 21, 2006 | Succeeded by Rich Zipperer |
| Preceded by Ben Brancel | Speaker of the Wisconsin State Assembly; November 4, 1997 – January 6, 2003 | Succeeded by John Gard |
