= Joseph F. Andrea =

20th century American politician

Member of the Wisconsin Senate from the 22nd district
- In office January 7, 1985 – January 6, 1997
- Preceded by: John J. Maurer
- Succeeded by: Robert Wirch

Member of the Wisconsin State Assembly
- In office January 3, 1983 – January 7, 1985
- Preceded by: Gary J. Barczak
- Succeeded by: Peggy Krusick
- Constituency: 24th Assembly district
- In office January 3, 1977 – January 3, 1983
- Preceded by: George Molinaro
- Succeeded by: Joseph Wimmer
- Constituency: 64th Assembly district

Member of Board of Supervisors of Kenosha County, Wisconsin
- In office April 1968 – 1977

Personal details
- Born: November 29, 1927 Kenosha, Wisconsin, U.S.
- Died: December 5, 2002 (aged 75) Kenosha, Wisconsin, U.S.
- Resting place: Sunset Ridge Memorial Park; Kenosha, Wisconsin
- Party: Democratic
- Spouse: Olivia Butteri (m. 1952–2002)
- Children: Alex; Mary (Kishline); Martin; Thomas

Military service
- Allegiance: United States
- Branch/service: United States Navy
- Years of service: 1946–1948
- Unit: USS Iowa (BB-61); USS Bremerton (CA-130)

Joseph F. Andrea (November 29, 1927 – December 5, 2002) was an American Democratic politician from Kenosha, Wisconsin. He served 12 years in the Wisconsin Senate, representing Kenosha County from 1985 to 1997. He previously served eight years in the Wisconsin State Assembly (1977–1985) and nine years on the Kenosha County board of supervisors (1968–1977). Before entering politics, Andrea was president of the Communications Workers of America Local 5510 in Kenosha.

== Early life ==
Andrea was born on November 29, 1927, in Kenosha, Wisconsin. He lived nearly his entire life in Kenosha, graduating from Kenosha's Mary D. Bradford High School in 1946. After graduation, he joined the United States Navy just as World War II was coming to an end. He served two years in the Navy, and was stationed aboard the battleship USS Iowa and the cruiser USS Bremerton.

After his honorable discharge in 1948, Andrea returned to Kenosha where he was employed by the Wisconsin Telephone Company for the next 31 years. At the Telephone Company, Andrea became a member of the Communications Workers of America union. He rose within the union ranks and was elected president of Local 5510 and chairman of the southern Wisconsin division of the CWA.

== Political career ==
In 1966, Andrea won his first public office when he was elected constable in his city ward. Two years later he challenged 12-year incumbent supervisor C. Roger Hubbard for his seat on the county board. Andrea was elected with strong support from Kenosha's labor community; he would go on to win re-election four times.

In the summer of 1976, Kenosha's long-time state representative George Molinaro announced he would retire after 30 years in the Assembly. Shortly after announcing his retirement, Molinaro announced that he would support Andrea to succeed him. With Molinaro's endorsement, Andrea faced no opponent from either party in the 1976 election. Andrea served four terms in the Assembly.

When state senator John J. Maurer announced his retirement in 1984, Andrea entered the race to succeed him. This time he faced a contested Democratic primary against former state representative Mary Wagner, who had represented the more rural western half of the county. Andrea prevailed with 63% of the vote in the primary, and won a landslide victory with 73% of the vote in the general election. Andrea won two more terms in the Senate. He announced his retirement in April 1996 and left office at the end of the year having never lost an election in his career. In his time in the legislature, Andrea was known to celebrate the "pork" projects that he brought back to Kenosha. At the time of his retirement, he said his top accomplishment was likely the LakeView Corporate Park in Pleasant Prairie, Wisconsin, which created 4,600 jobs and continues to be a source of significant employment and economic activity in Kenosha County.

== Personal life and family ==
Joseph Andrea was a son of Carmine (Carmen) Andrea and his second wife Natalina (née Maletta). Carmine Andrea was an Italian American immigrant who emigrated to Kenosha as a young man in 1921. He was also active in union labor as a member of the Teamsters and later AFSCME.

Joseph Andrea was a Roman Catholic and was active in many Catholic organizations, such as the Catholic Youth Organization and the Society of the Holy Name. He was married to Olivia Butteri in 1952. They had four children together and were married for 50 years before his death in 2002. Joseph Andrea died on December 5, 2002, at his home in Kenosha.

Lake Andrea and the Joseph F. Andrea Regional Cancer Center at St. Catherine's Hospital, both in Pleasant Prairie, were named in his honor.

Wisconsin State Assembly
Preceded by George Molinaro	Member of the Wisconsin State Assembly from 64th district January 3, 1977 – January 3, 1983	Succeeded by Joseph Wimmer
Preceded by Gary J. Barczak	Member of the Wisconsin State Assembly from 24th district January 3, 1983 – January 7, 1985	Succeeded by Peggy Krusick
Wisconsin Senate
Preceded by John J. Maurer	Member of the Wisconsin Senate from 22nd district January 7, 1985 – January 6, 1997	Succeeded by Robert Wirch
