= Wisconsin's 32nd Assembly district =

American legislative district in southeast Wisconsin

Wisconsin's 32nd State Assembly district
- 2024 map defined in 2023 Wisc. Act 94; 2022 map defined in Johnson v. Wisconsin Elections Commission; 2011 map was defined in 2011 Wisc. Act 43
Assemblymember
| Amanda Nedweski; R–Pleasant Prairie |
since January 6, 2025 (1 years)
- Demographics: 88.81% White; 1.25% Black; 5.75% Hispanic; 1.36% Asian; 1.92% Native American; 0.11% Hawaiian/Pacific Islander
- Population (2020) • Voting age: 58,981; 45,797
- Website: Official website
- Notes: Southeast Wisconsin

The 32nd Assembly district of Wisconsin is one of 99 districts in the Wisconsin State Assembly. Located in southeast Wisconsin, the district comprises most of Kenosha County and part of southeast Walworth County. It includes part of the city of Lake Geneva and the villages of Bloomfield, Paddock Lake, Salem Lakes, and Twin Lakes, and the southern half of the village of Pleasant Prairie. The district also contains the Richard Bong State Recreation Area and Chiwaukee Prairie Nature Preserve. The seat is represented by Republican Amanda Nedweski since January 2025; Nedweski previously represented the 61st district from 2023 to 2025.

The 32nd Assembly district is located within Wisconsin's 11th Senate district, along with the 31st and 33rd Assembly districts.

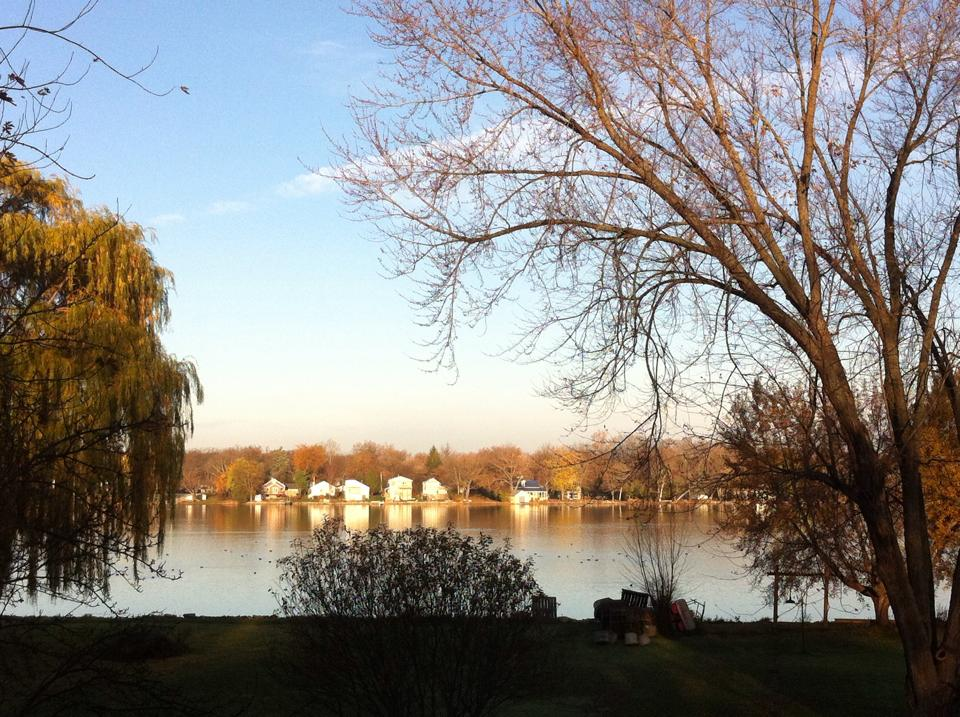
Camp Lake community in the village of Salem Lakes

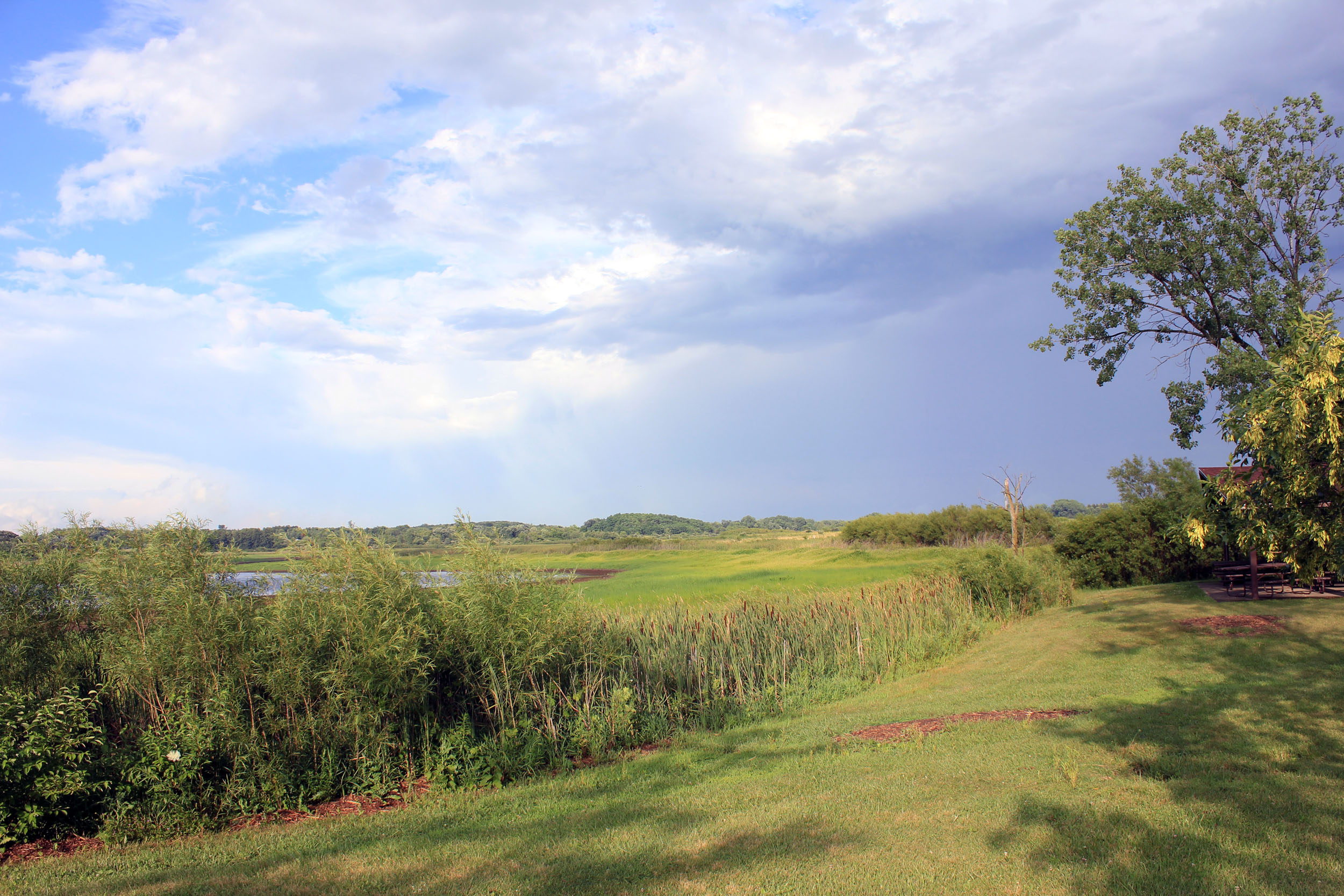
Richard Bong State Recreation Area

== List of past representatives ==
List of representatives to the Wisconsin State Assembly from the 32nd district
| Member | Party | Residence | Counties represented | Term start | Term end | Ref. |
|---|---|---|---|---|---|---|
District created
| Peter J. Tropman | Dem. | Milwaukee | Milwaukee | January 1, 1973 | January 3, 1977 | |
| Dismas Becker | Dem. | Milwaukee | Milwaukee | January 3, 1977 | January 3, 1983 | |
| James M. Stewart | Rep. | Whitewater | Jefferson, Rock | January 3, 1983 | January 7, 1985 | |
| Joseph Wimmer | Rep. | Waukesha | Jefferson, Waukesha | January 7, 1985 | September 6, 1991 | |
| --Vacant-- | | | Jefferson, Waukesha | September 6, 1991 | January 20, 1992 | |
| Scott R. Jensen | Rep. | Waukesha | Jefferson, Waukesha | January 20, 1992 | January 6, 2003 | |
| Thomas Lothian | Rep. | Williams Bay | Kenosha, Walworth | January 6, 2003 | January 3, 2011 | |
| Tyler August | Rep. | Lake Geneva | Kenosha, Racine, Walworth | January 3, 2011 | January 6, 2025 | |
| Tyler August | Rep. | Lake Geneva | Kenosha, Walworth | January 3, 2011 | January 6, 2025 | |
| Amanda Nedweski | Rep. | Pleasant Prairie | Kenosha, Walworth | January 6, 2025 | Current | |
