= Wisconsin's 64th Assembly district =

American legislative district in Kenosha County, Wisconsin

Wisconsin's 64th State Assembly district
- 2024 map defined in 2023 Wisc. Act 94; 2022 map defined in Johnson v. Wisconsin Elections Commission; 2011 map was defined in 2011 Wisc. Act 43
Assemblymember
Tip McGuire; D–Somers
since May 13, 2019 (7 years)
- Demographics: 69.5% White; 10.41% Black; 15.25% Hispanic; 3.38% Asian; 2.03% Native American; 0.14% Hawaiian/Pacific Islander
- Population (2020) • Voting age: 60,090; 46,725
- Website: Official website
- Notes: Southeast Wisconsin

The 64th Assembly district of Wisconsin is one of 99 districts in the Wisconsin State Assembly. Located in southeast Wisconsin, the district comprises the northeast corner of Kenosha County, including all of the village of Somers and the northern half of the city of Kenosha. The district also contains the University of Wisconsin–Parkside campus, Carthage College, the Kenosha campus of Gateway Technical College, and Kenosha Regional Airport. The district is represented by Democrat Tip McGuire, since May 2019.

The 64th Assembly district is located within Wisconsin's 22nd Senate district, along with the 65th and 66th Assembly districts.

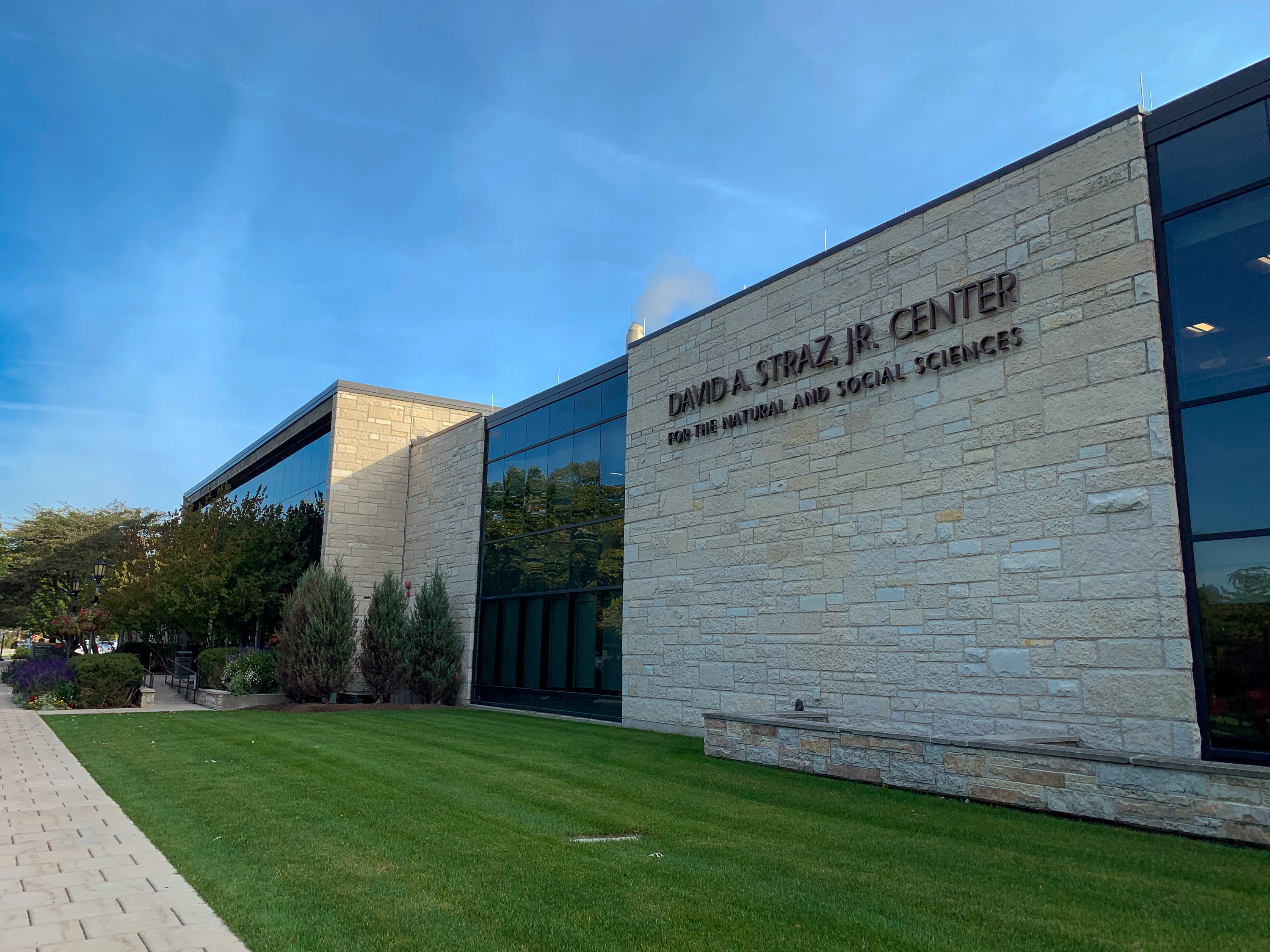
Straz Center at Carthage College

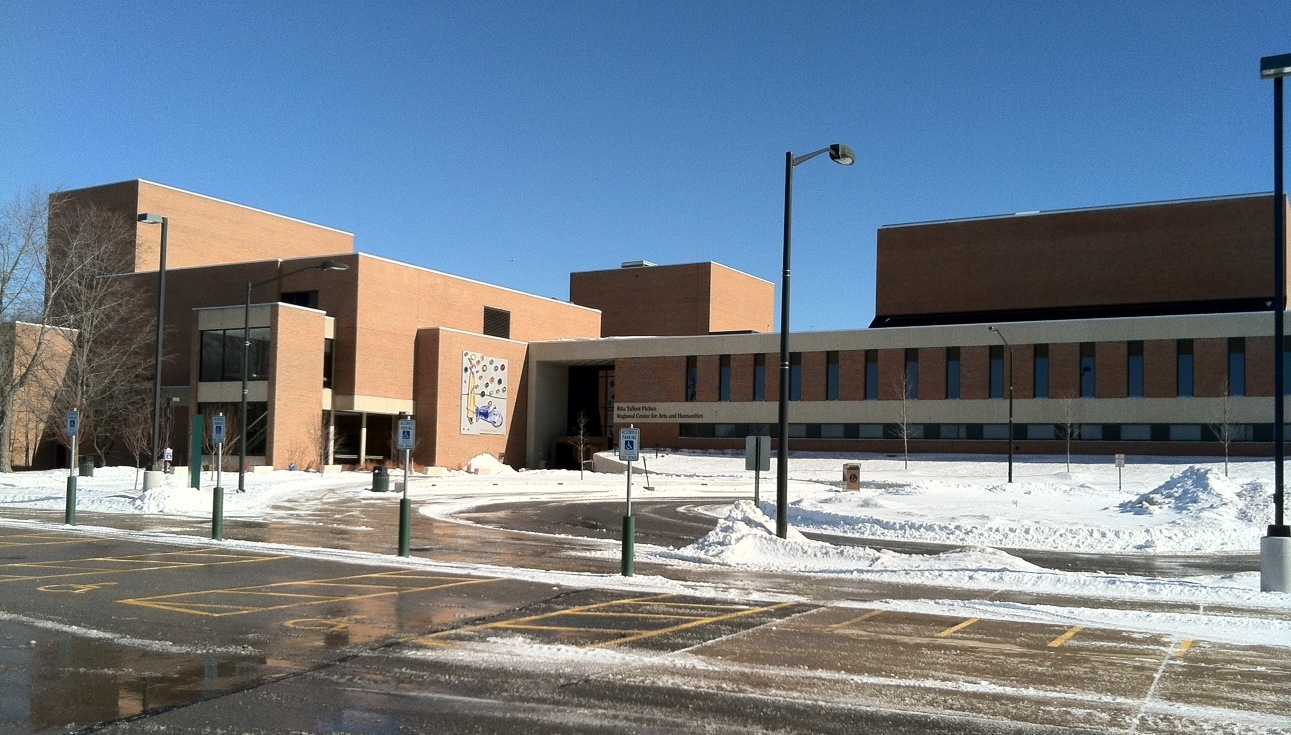
Rita Tallent Picken Regional Center on the University of Wisconsin–Parkside campus

== History ==
The district was created in the 1972 redistricting act (1971 Wisc. Act 304) which first established the numbered district system, replacing the previous system which allocated districts to specific counties. The 64th district was drawn from part of the former Kenosha County 1st district, which had encompassed nearly all of the city of Kenosha. The 1972 64th Assembly district was drawn from the north side of the city, the south side wards were used to create a third Kenosha County-based district (the 65th). The last representative of the Kenosha 1st district, George Molinaro, went on to win election as the first representative of the 64th Assembly district.

Other than the 1982 redistricting, which temporarily scrambled State Assembly districts, the boundaries of the 64th district remained relatively consistent for the next 40 years, confined to the wards of the north side of the city of Kenosha. That changed in the controversial 2011 redistricting plan (2011 Wisc. Act 43) which moved the district further north to straddle the boundary between Kenosha and Racine counties. This was done as part of a broader gerrymander of the southeast Wisconsin districts to pack the majority of Racine and Kenosha Democratic votes into one state senate district. This map was only slightly adjusted in the 2022 court-ordered redistricting plan. The 2024 map removed all of the Racine County precincts from the district and added all of the rest of the village of Somers and more of the city of Kenosha.

Notable former representatives of this district include George Molinaro, who was the 62nd speaker of the Wisconsin State Assembly, and Peter W. Barca, a one-time U.S. representative (WI-01) and former secretary of the Wisconsin Department of Revenue.

== List of past representatives ==
List of representatives to the Wisconsin State Assembly from the 64th district
Member	Party	Residence	Counties represented	Term start	Term end	Ref.
District created
George Molinaro	Dem.	Kenosha	Kenosha	January 1, 1973	January 3, 1977	
Joseph F. Andrea	Dem.	Kenosha	Kenosha	January 3, 1977	January 3, 1983	
Joseph Wimmer	Rep.	Waukesha	Jefferson, Walworth, Waukesha	January 3, 1983	January 7, 1985	
Peter W. Barca	Dem.	Kenosha	Kenosha	January 7, 1985	June 8, 1993	
--Vacant--			Kenosha	June 8, 1993	September 13, 1993	
James Kreuser	Dem.	Kenosha	Kenosha	September 13, 1993	January 5, 2009	
Peter W. Barca	Dem.	Kenosha	Kenosha	January 5, 2009	January 8, 2019	
Peter W. Barca	Dem.	Kenosha	Kenosha, Racine	January 5, 2009	January 8, 2019	
--Vacant--			Kenosha, Racine	January 8, 2019	May 13, 2019	
Tip McGuire	Dem.	Somers	Kenosha, Racine	May 13, 2019	Current	
Tip McGuire	Dem.	Somers	Kenosha	May 13, 2019	Current	

== Electoral history ==
Year	Date	Elected				Defeated				Total	Plurality	Other primary candidates
1972	Nov. 7	George Molinaro	Democratic	11,113	74.25%	Joseph Rodriguez	Rep.	3,855	25.75%	14,968	7,258	Dominick J. Salerno (Dem.)
1974	Nov. 5	George Molinaro (inc.)	Democratic	7,220	100.0%					7,220	7,220	Gerald F. Bellow (Dem.)
1976	Nov. 2	Joseph F. Andrea	Democratic	13,854	100.0%					13,854	13,854	Marc C. Lindas (Dem.); Mario T. Capponi (Dem.); Gerald F. Bellow (Dem.)
1978	Nov. 7	Joseph F. Andrea (inc.)	Democratic	8,210	100.0%					8,210	8,210	
1980	Nov. 4	Joseph F. Andrea (inc.)	Democratic	12,988	100.0%					12,988	12,988	
1982	Nov. 2	Joseph Wimmer	Republican	8,470	62.25%	Mary Carlson	Dem.	5,136	37.75%	13,606	3,334	Robert G. Hoskins (Dem.)
1984	Nov. 6	Peter W. Barca	Democratic	14,745	78.43%	Gary T. Adelson	Rep.	3,741	19.90%	18,801	11,004	Marlene Mura (Dem.); David D. Holtze Sr. (Dem.); Mark C. Lindas (Dem.); Gerald F. Bellow (Dem.); Frank J. Perone (Dem.); Charles E. Waller (Dem.)
1984	Nov. 6	Peter W. Barca	Democratic	14,745	78.43%	Tony Michetti	Con.	315	1.68%	18,801	11,004	Marlene Mura (Dem.); David D. Holtze Sr. (Dem.); Mark C. Lindas (Dem.); Gerald F. Bellow (Dem.); Frank J. Perone (Dem.); Charles E. Waller (Dem.)
1986	Nov. 4	Peter W. Barca (inc.)	Democratic	9,439	82.20%	Timothy G. Blackmon	Rep.	2,044	17.80%	11,483	7,395	
1988	Nov. 8	Peter W. Barca (inc.)	Democratic	14,126	100.0%					14,126	14,126	
1990	Nov. 6	Peter W. Barca (inc.)	Democratic	7,389	74.20%	Michael F. Phebus	Rep.	2,569	25.80%	9,958	4,820	
1992	Nov. 3	Peter W. Barca (inc.)	Democratic	15,730	100.0%					15,730	15,730	
1993	Aug. 31	James Kreuser	Democratic	2,940	68.01%	William F. Cantwell	Rep.	1,383	31.99%	4,323	1,557	Louise I. Principe (Dem.); Dennis A. Shook (Dem.)
1994	Nov. 8	James Kreuser (inc.)	Democratic	9,622	100.0%					9,622	9,622	
1996	Nov. 5	James Kreuser (inc.)	Democratic	12,867	74.68%	Don Ruge	Rep.	4,363	25.32%	17,230	8,504	
1998	Nov. 3	James Kreuser (inc.)	Democratic	11,488	72.64%	Don Ruge	Rep.	4,328	27.36%	15,816	7,160	
2000	Nov. 7	James Kreuser (inc.)	Democratic	15,296	99.78%					15,330	15,262	
2002	Nov. 5	James Kreuser (inc.)	Democratic	8,693	99.95%					8,697	8,689	
2004	Nov. 2	James Kreuser (inc.)	Democratic	16,340	99.96%					16,347	16,333	
2006	Nov. 7	James Kreuser (inc.)	Democratic	12,058	98.67%					12,220	11,896	
2008	Nov. 4	Peter W. Barca	Democratic	19,739	98.71%					19,996	19,482	Jim Huff (Dem.); Michael J. Orth (Dem.)
2010	Nov. 2	Peter W. Barca (inc.)	Democratic	9,667	84.17%	Daane Hoffman	Lib.	1,774	15.45%	11,485	7,893	
2012	Nov. 6	Peter W. Barca (inc.)	Democratic	20,264	96.84%					20,926	19,602	
2014	Nov. 4	Peter W. Barca (inc.)	Democratic	13,887	95.54%					14,536	13,238	
2016	Nov. 8	Peter W. Barca (inc.)	Democratic	18,799	97.67%					19,248	18,350	
2018	Nov. 6	Peter W. Barca (inc.)	Democratic	16,773	78.32%	Thomas Harland	Con.	4,441	20.74%	21,416	12,332	
2019	Apr. 30	Tip McGuire	Democratic	4,424	62.15%	Mark Stalker	Rep.	2,677	37.61%	7,118	1,747	Gina Walkington (Dem.); Spencer Zimmerman (Dem.)
2020	Nov. 3	Tip McGuire (inc.)	Democratic	16,364	56.00%	Ed Hibsch	Rep.	12,813	43.85%	29,219	3,551	
2022	Nov. 8	Tip McGuire (inc.)	Democratic	12,873	56.73%	Ed Hibsch	Rep.	9,799	43.19%	22,690	3,074	
