= Kennedy Galleries =

Art gallery in Manhattan, New York, U.S.

- Founded: 1874
- Founder: Hermann Wunderlich
- Dissolved: 2005 (public gallery)
- Type: Art gallery; private art dealership
- Headquarters: Manhattan, New York City, New York, U.S.
- Products: American historical art; representational art
- Key people: Martha J. Fleischman (President)
- Website: www.kgny.com

Kennedy Galleries is an art gallery in Manhattan in New York City. Founded in 1874, it is one of the oldest art galleries in the United States. At its 1974 centennial, The New York Times described the gallery as "one of the most important galleries anywhere specializing in American historical art."

== History ==
It was founded by Hermann Wunderlich in 1874 under the name of Hermann Wunderlich & Co on John Street in Lower Manhattan. In its early years, it was the first American dealer for the paintings of James McNeill Whistler, who spent a good deal of time at the gallery.

When Wunderlich died in 1892, Edward G. Kennedy took over the gallery, whose name was changed in 1912 to Kennedy & Co. The gallery's new name was at least in part a response to rising anti-German sentiment in the United States in the lead-up to World War I. Kennedy retired in 1916, whereupon Herman Wunderlich became the gallery's senior partner until his death in 1951. The gallery changed its name to Kennedy Galleries in 1952.

The gallery has long specialized in representational art. During the 1950s the Society of American Graphic Artists held their annual exhibitions at the Kennedy Galleries.

Lawrence Fleischman became a partner in the gallery in 1966, and in the same year, the gallery moved to a new location on 56th Street. For its 1974 centennial, it then moved to a new space on 57th Street.

In 1976 the gallery held an exhibit of Alaskan masters. R. T. Wallen was one of only two living artists represented at that exhibit.

In 1994, the gallery moved to 730 Fifth Avenue. In 2005, the gallery closed its gallery space but continued to operate as a private dealership.

Martha J. Fleischman is president of the Kennedy Galleries.

== Notable works handled ==
Kennedy Galleries and its predecessor H. Wunderlich & Company handled works by James McNeill Whistler from the late 19th century onward. H. Wunderlich & Company was the main American contact for Whistler and exhibited his Venetian prints in "Arrangement in White & Yellow" as well as his first painting exhibition in the United States, "Notes" – "Harmonies" – "Nocturnes," in 1889.

Of other notable works, Kennedy Galleries has been recorded as a prior handler of Rembrandt's etching The Artist's Mother: Head only, full Face.

Kennedy Galleries also handled notable American print material. The Currier & Ives large-folio lithograph Life in the Woods. "Returning to Camp." has been recorded with a Kennedy label on the reverse, and John James Audubon double-elephant folio prints bear old Kennedy Gallery labels.
