= Senator Lasee =

Senator Lasee may refer to:

- Alan Lasee (born 1937), Wisconsin State Senate
- Frank Lasee (born 1961), Wisconsin State Senate
