= Vernon W. Holschbach =

20th century American politician

Member of the Wisconsin State Assembly
- In office January 7, 1985 – January 3, 1993
- Preceded by: Gary K. Johnson
- Succeeded by: Bob Ziegelbauer
- Constituency: 25th Assembly district
- In office January 3, 1983 – January 7, 1985
- Preceded by: Mary Lou Munts
- Succeeded by: Rebecca Young
- Constituency: 76th Assembly district
- In office January 5, 1981 – January 3, 1983
- Preceded by: Francis J. Lallensack
- Succeeded by: John Plewa
- Constituency: 2nd Assembly district

Personal details
- Born: October 17, 1926 Manitowoc, Wisconsin, U.S.
- Died: April 28, 2014 (aged 87) Aurora Health Care Center, Green Bay, Wisconsin, U.S.
- Resting place: Calvary Cemetery, Manitowoc, Wisconsin
- Party: Democratic
- Spouse: Dorothy Reed (m. 1949–2014)
- Children: 11
- Education: Lakeshore Technical College
- Occupation: Bricklayer

Vernon W. "Vern" Holschbach (October 17, 1926 – April 28, 2014) was an American construction worker and Democratic politician from Manitowoc, Wisconsin. He represented Manitowoc County in the Wisconsin State Assembly for 12 years (1981–1993). He was the author of Wisconsin's lemon law. Earlier in his life, he was president of the International Union of Bricklayers and Allied Craftworkers local in Manitowoc and served 12 years on the Manitowoc County board of supervisors.

== Early life ==
Vern Holschbach was born, raised, and lived most of his life in Manitowoc, Wisconsin. He attended St. Boniface parochial grade school and graduated from Lincoln High School in 1944. He went on to attend college at Manitowoc County's Lakeshore Technical College. He was employed as a bricklayer and mason and became an active member of the International Union of Bricklayers and Allied Craftworkers, and was elected president of the local.

== Political career ==
Holschbach first entered public office in 1968 when he was elected to the Manitowoc County board of supervisors. He was re-elected in 1970, 1972, 1974, 1976, and 1978. Through his union and local government activities, Horschbach was increasingly active in the Democratic Party of Wisconsin.

In 1980, four-term Democratic incumbent state representative Francis J. Lallensack announced he would not run for re-election. Holschbach entered the race for Wisconsin State Assembly in the 2nd state Assembly district. The Democratic primary became extremely crowded, with five other candidates seeking election in the generally safe Democratic district. Holschbach benefited from his decade of service on the county board, his union allies, and deep connections in the community. He prevailed in the primary with 28% of the vote, just 258 votes ahead of his closest competitor, Michael P. Dewane. He went on to win the general election with 57% of the vote, defeating fellow county board supervisor Charles W. Kraemer.

After his first election, the Wisconsin legislature was redistricted by court order by a panel of federal judges. The redistricting was intentionally punitive to incumbent representatives, but had little effect on Holschbach's district, his district was changed to the 76th Assembly district, it lost some of the suburban areas around Manitowoc, and expanded into rural areas further south and west, but he improved his margin in the 1982 general election, receiving over 58% of the vote that year.

After the 1982 elections, Democrats held full control of state government and passed a new redistricting act to supersede the court-ordered plan. Holschbach's district again was mostly unchanged, but renumbered again. For the remainder of his time in office he resided in the 25th Assembly district. He won his re-elections in 1984, 1986, and 1988, receiving a similar portion of the general election vote. He faced no opponent in the 1990 election.

In the 1989–1990 and 1991–1992 legislative sessions, Holschbach served as chairman of the Assembly labor committee. In the legislature, he was known as a defender of working people and consumer interests. He was author of Wisconsin's "Lemon Law", still one of the strongest state consumer protection laws in the country. He also authored and helped pass legislation which required employers to give additional warning before plant closures, raised Wisconsin's minimum wage, and establishing additional workplace safety protections. He also authored a law ahead of its time, which protected workers from employment discrimination based on genetic tests.

In the summer of 1992, Holschbach announced that he would not run for a seventh term. His son, Todd Holschbach sought to succeed him in the 1992 Democratic primary, but was defeated by Bob Ziegelbauer, who went on to win the general election.

== Personal life and family ==
Vern Holschbach was the son of Paul Holschbach and his wife Clara (née Dirkmann).

He married Dorothy Reed on September 3, 1949, at St. Paul Catholic Church in Manitowoc. They were active throughout much of their lives with Saint Boniface Catholic Parish in Manitowoc. They had 11 children and were married for 64 years. Their son Todd Holschbach worked for many years as a legislative aide, and was a lobbyist for environmental causes until 2023.

After leaving the Legislature, Holschbach largely retired from politics. He died at age 87, at Aurora Health Care Center, in Green Bay, Wisconsin. He was survived by all 11 of his children, 19 grandchildren, and 9 great-grandchildren.

== Electoral history ==
=== Wisconsin Assembly, 2nd district (1980) ===
Year	Election	Date	Elected				Defeated				Total	Plurality
1980	Primary	Sep. 9	Vernon W. Holschbach	Democratic	1,781	28.61%	Michael P. Dewane	Dem.	1,523	24.46%	6,226	258
1980	Primary	Sep. 9	Vernon W. Holschbach	Democratic	1,781	28.61%	Robert F. Ziegelbauer	Dem.	1,191	19.13%	6,226	258
1980	Primary	Sep. 9	Vernon W. Holschbach	Democratic	1,781	28.61%	Paul A. Mullins	Dem.	1,056	16.96%	6,226	258
1980	Primary	Sep. 9	Vernon W. Holschbach	Democratic	1,781	28.61%	Richard J. Rabideau	Dem.	427	6.86%	6,226	258
1980	Primary	Sep. 9	Vernon W. Holschbach	Democratic	1,781	28.61%	Peter C. Jones	Dem.	248	3.98%	6,226	258
1980	General	Nov. 4	Vernon W. Holschbach	Democratic	10,980	57.13%	Charles W. Kraemer	Rep.	8,239	42.87%	19,219	2,741

=== Wisconsin Assembly, 76th district (1982) ===
Year	Election	Date	Elected				Defeated				Total	Plurality
1982	Primary	Sep. 14	Vernon W. Holschbach	Democratic	4,032	59.43%	Robert F. Ziegelbauer	Dem.	2,753	40.57%	6,785	1,279
1982	General	Nov. 2	Vernon W. Holschbach	Democratic	9,499	58.52%	Richard H. Stolz	Rep.	6,588	40.58%	16,233	2,911
1982	General	Nov. 2	Vernon W. Holschbach	Democratic	9,499	58.52%	Donald E. Stenz	Con.	146	0.90%	16,233	2,911

=== Wisconsin Assembly, 25th district (1984–1990) ===
Year	Election	Date	Elected				Defeated				Total	Plurality
1984	General	Nov. 6	Vernon W. Holschbach	Democratic	12,087	57.25%	Michael P. Dewane	Rep.	9,027	42.75%	21,114	3,060
1986	General	Nov. 4	Vernon W. Holschbach (inc)	Democratic	8,783	56.29%	Courtney A. Leonard	Rep.	6,820	43.71%	15,603	1,963
1988	General	Nov. 8	Vernon W. Holschbach (inc)	Democratic	12,088	59.60%	Courtney A. Leonard	Rep.	8,194	40.40%	20,282	3,894
1990	General	Nov. 6	Vernon W. Holschbach (inc)	Democratic	10,139	100.0%					10,139	10,139

Wisconsin State Assembly
Preceded by Francis J. Lallensack	Member of the Wisconsin State Assembly from the 2nd district January 5, 1981 – January 3, 1983	Succeeded by John Plewa
Preceded by Mary Lou Munts	Member of the Wisconsin State Assembly from the 76th district January 3, 1983 – January 7, 1985	Succeeded by Rebecca Young
Preceded by Gary K. Johnson	Member of the Wisconsin State Assembly from the 25th district January 7, 1985 – January 3, 1993	Succeeded by Bob Ziegelbauer
