= 2018 Wisconsin Senate election =

- November 6, 2018

17 of the 33 seats in the Wisconsin State Senate 17 seats needed for a majority
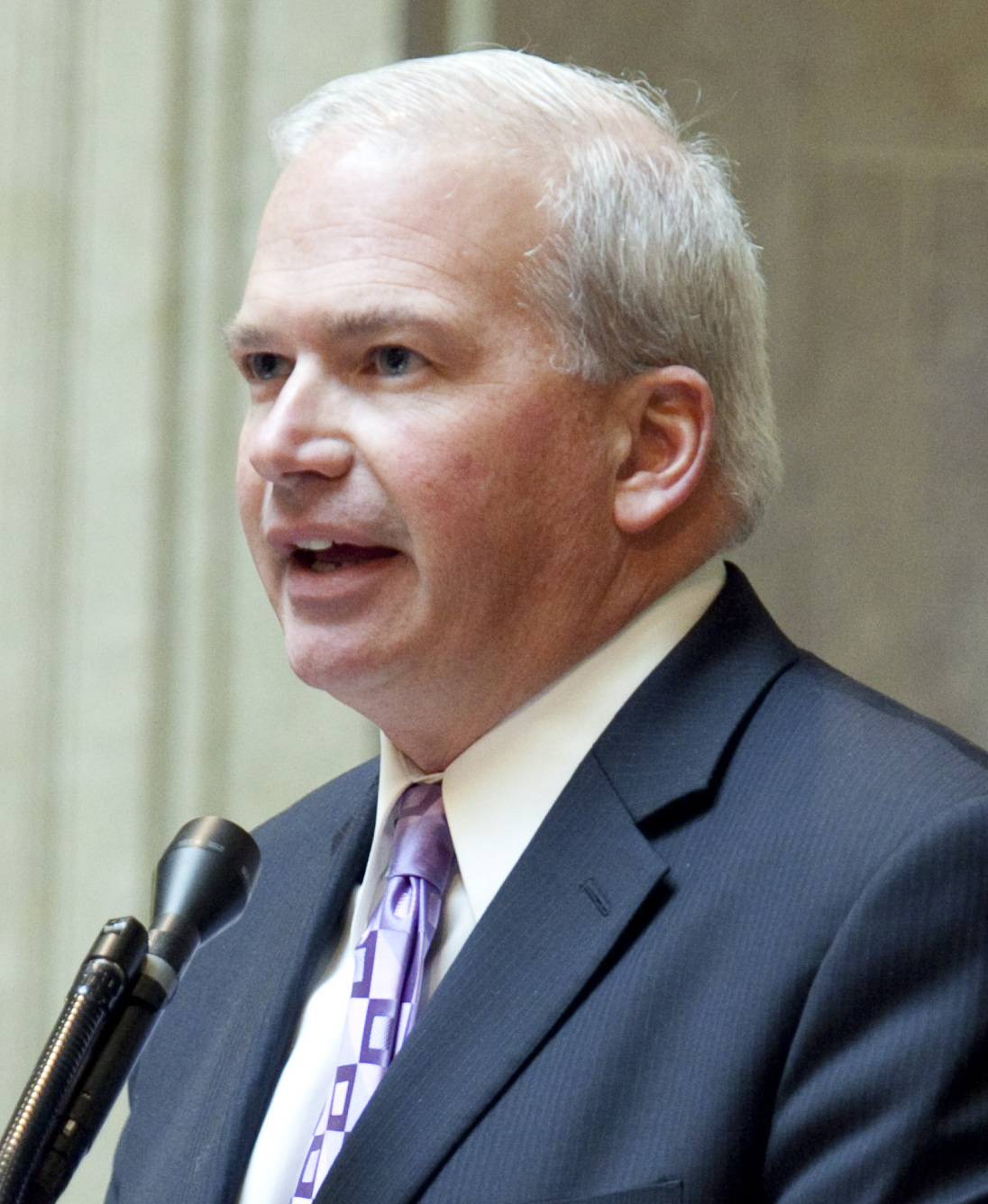

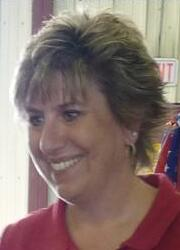
	Majority party	Minority party
Leader	Scott Fitzgerald	Jennifer Shilling
Party	Republican	Democratic
Leader since	January 1, 2007	January 5, 2015
Leader's seat	13th–Juneau	32nd–La Crosse
Last election	9 seats, 48.62%	7 seats, 50.26%
Seats before	18	15
Seats won	11	6
Seats after	19	14
Seat change	▲1	▼1
Popular vote	675,016	605,142
Percentage	52.31%	46.90%
- Results of the elections: Republican hold Republican gain Democratic hold No election
President before election
Roger Roth
Republican
Elected President
Roger Roth
Republican

The 2018 Wisconsin Senate elections were held on Tuesday, November 6, 2018, at the Fall general election in Wisconsin. Seventeen of the 33 seats in the Wisconsin Senate were up for election—the odd-numbered districts. Before the election, Republicans held 18 seats and Democrats held 15 seats. Of the seats up for election, 10 were held by Republicans and seven were held by Democrats. The primary election was held on August 14, 2018.

Republicans maintained control of the Senate, flipping one Democratic-held seat to enter the 104th Wisconsin Legislature with 19 of 33 Senate seats.

== Results summary ==
Statewide results of the 2018 Wisconsin State Senate election:

Seats		Party (majority caucus shading)		Total
Seats		Democratic	Republican	Total
Last election (2016)		7	9	16
Total after last election (2016)		13	20	33
Total before this election		15	18	33
Up for election		7	10	17
of which:	Incumbent retiring	1	0	1
of which:	Vacated	0	0	0
of which:	Unopposed	1	1	2
This election		6	11	17
Change from last election		▼1	▲1	
Total after this election		14	19	33
Change in total		▼1	▲1	

Party	Candi- dates	Votes		Seats		
Party	Candi- dates	No.	%	No.	+/–	%
Republican Party	15	675,016	52.31%	11	▲1	64.71%
Democratic Party	15	605,142	46.90%	6	▼1	35.29%
Independent	1	1,776	0.14%	0	Steady	0.00%
Write-in	2	57	0.00%	0	Steady	0.00%
Scattering		8,346	0.65%	0	Steady	0.00%
Total	33	1,290,337	100.00%	17	Steady	100.00%

Popular vote
Republican	52.31%
Democratic	46.90%
Other	0.79%

House seats
Republican	64.71%
Democratic	35.29%

=== Close races ===
Seats where the margin of victory was under 10%:

1. State Senate district 25, 2.14%
2. State Senate district 5, 2.4%
3. State Senate district 31, 5.66%
4. State Senate district 19, 6.5%
5. State Senate district 17, 8.24%
6. State Senate district 1, 9.08% (gain)

== Special elections ==
Two special elections were held during 2018 for vacancies in the state Senate. Democrats won both special elections, for a net gain of two seats.

Dist.	Previous incumbent			This election	
Dist.	Senator	Party	First elected	Candidate(s)	Result
01	Frank Lasee	Rep.	2010	▌Caleb Frostman (Dem.) 51.38%; ▌André Jacque (Rep.) 48.55%	Incumbent resigned on Dec. 29, 2017. New member elected Jun. 12, 2018. Democratic gain.
10	Sheila Harsdorf	Rep.	2000	▌Patty Schachtner (Dem.) 54.60%; ▌Adam Jarchow (Rep.) 44.17%; ▌Brian J. Corriea (Lib.) 1.22%	Incumbent resigned on Nov. 10, 2017. New member elected Jan. 16, 2018. Democratic gain.

== Outgoing incumbents ==
=== Retiring ===
- Terry Moulton (R–Chippewa Falls), representing District 23 since 2010, did not run for re-election.

=== Seeking other office ===
- Kathleen Vinehout (D–Alma), representing District 31 since 2006, ran for governor of Wisconsin, but lost in the primary.
- Leah Vukmir (R–Brookfield), representing District 5 since 2010, ran for United States Senate, but lost the general election.

== Predictions ==
Source	Ranking	As of
Governing	Tossup	October 8, 2018

== Candidates and results ==
Results of the 2018 Wisconsin State Senate election by district:

District	Democratic		Republican		Others		Total	Result (Note: Compared to the 2014 election.)
District	Votes	%	Votes	%	Votes	%	Votes	Result
District 1	39,414	45.42%	47,289	54.50%	65	0.07%	86,768	Republican gain
District 3	36,875	97.40%	-	-	985	2.60%	37,860	Democratic hold
District 5	45,591	48.75%	47,836	51.15%	102	0.11%	93,529	Republican hold
District 7	56,198	66.25%	28,459	33.55%	165	0.19%	84,822	Democratic hold
District 9	31,684	41.47%	44,680	58.47%	45	0.06%	76,409	Republican hold
District 11	-	-	59,512	95.89%	2,554	4.11%	62,066	Republican hold
District 13	34,385	40.90%	49,668	59.07%	24	0.03%	84,077	Republican hold
District 15	54,381	96.53%	-	-	1,952	3.47%	56,333	Democratic hold
District 17	31,757	45.86%	37,465	54.10%	26	0.04%	69,248	Republican hold
District 19	38,179	46.73%	43,493	53.23%	29	0.04%	81,701	Republican hold
District 21	35,111	41.91%	48,603	58.01%	69	0.08%	83,783	Republican hold
District 23	29,637	40.82%	42,958	59.17%	11	0.02%	72,606	Republican hold
District 25	39,624	51.06%	37,960	48.92%	20	0.03%	77,604	Democratic hold
District 27	64,606	66.16%	32,993	33.79%	54	0.06%	97,653	Democratic hold
District 29	27,627	35.73%	49,657	64.22%	41	0.05%	77,325	Republican hold
District 31	40,073	51.67%	35,684	46.01%	1,804	2.33%	77,561	Democratic hold
District 33	-	-	68,759	96.85%	2,233	3.15%	70,992	Republican hold
Total	605,142	46.90%	675,016	52.31%	10,179	0.79%	1,290,337	

== See also ==
- 2018 Wisconsin elections
  - 2018 Wisconsin gubernatorial election
  - 2018 Wisconsin Attorney General election
  - 2018 Wisconsin State Assembly election
  - 2018 United States Senate election in Wisconsin
  - 2018 United States House of Representatives elections in Wisconsin
- 2018 United States elections
- Wisconsin Senate
- Elections in Wisconsin
- Redistricting in Wisconsin
