= Wisconsin's 2nd Assembly district =

American legislative district in northeast Wisconsin

Wisconsin's 2nd State Assembly district
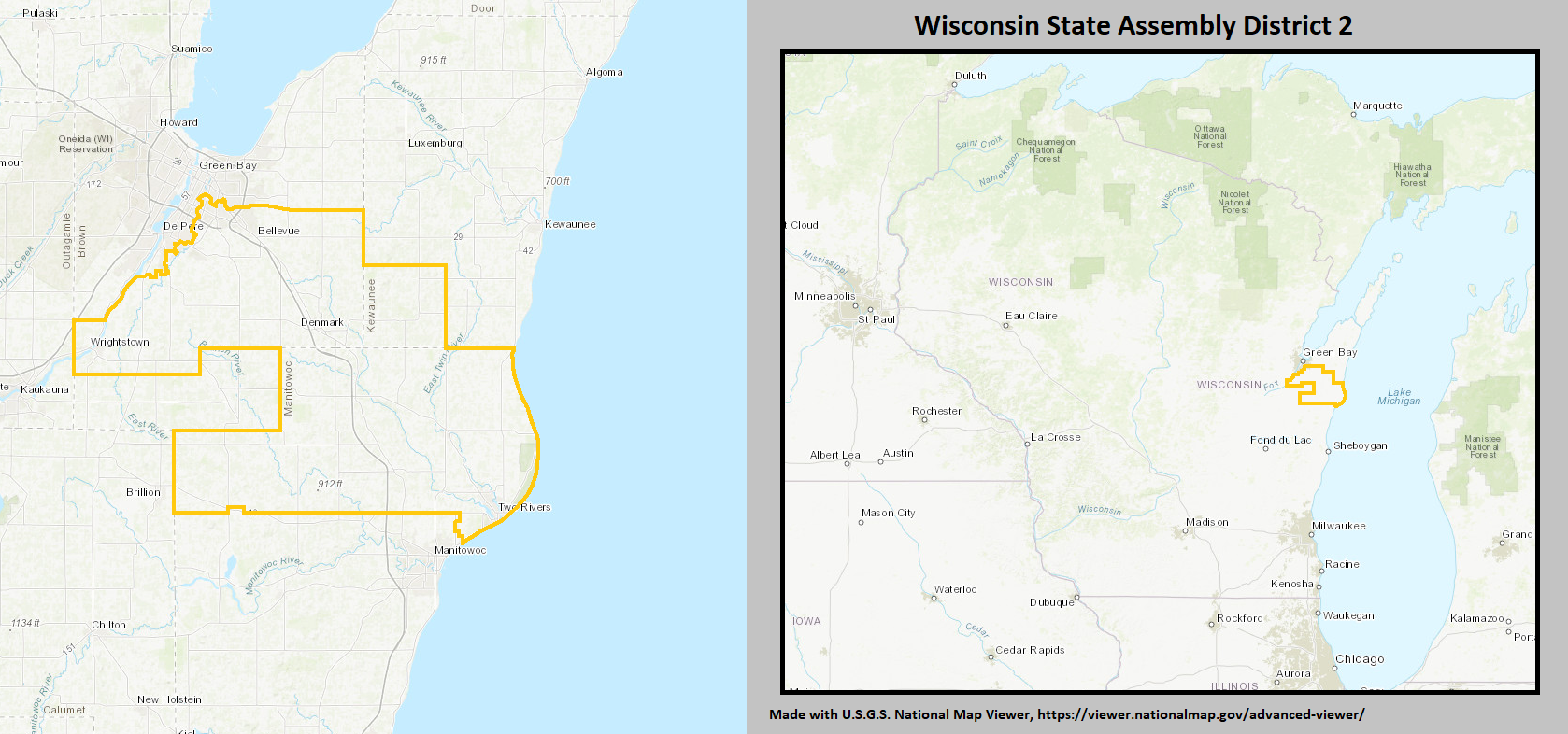
- 2024 map defined in 2023 Wisc. Act 94; 2022 map defined in Johnson v. Wisconsin Elections Commission; 2011 map was defined in 2011 Wisc. Act 43; 2002 map was defined in Baumgart v. Wendelberger
Assemblymember
Shae Sortwell; R–Two Rivers
since January 7, 2019 (7 years, 286 days)
- Demographics: 93.14% White; 0.9% Black; 2.53% Hispanic; 1.28% Asian; 1.62% Native American; 0.04% Hawaiian/Pacific Islander
- Population (2020) • Voting age: 59,983; 45,212
- Website: Official website
- Notes: Northeast Wisconsin

The 2nd Assembly district of Wisconsin is one of 99 districts in the Wisconsin State Assembly. Located in northeast Wisconsin, the district comprises most of northern Manitowoc County and southern Brown County, along with parts of southeast Outagamie County. It includes the villages of Combined Locks, Denmark, Francis Creek, Kimberly, Mishicot, and Reedsville, and most of the village of Wrightstown and the southern half of Kaukauna. The district is represented by Republican Shae Sortwell, since January 2019.

The 2nd Assembly district is located within Wisconsin's 1st Senate district, along with the 1st and 3rd Assembly districts.

== History ==
The district was created in the 1972 redistricting act (1971 Wisc. Act 304) which first established the numbered district system, replacing the previous system which allocated districts to specific counties. The 2nd district was drawn to combine the previous Manitowoc County 1st district (the city of Manitowoc) with municipalities of southeastern Manitowoc County which had been part of the Manitowoc County 2nd district. Donald K. Helgeson, the last representative of the Manitowoc 1st district, was defeated in the 1972 election to represent the new 2nd Assembly district.

Other than the 1982 court-ordered redistricting plan which scrambled state legislative maps for one term, the location of the 2nd district has remained relatively consistent—based in northern Manitowoc County and southern Brown County.

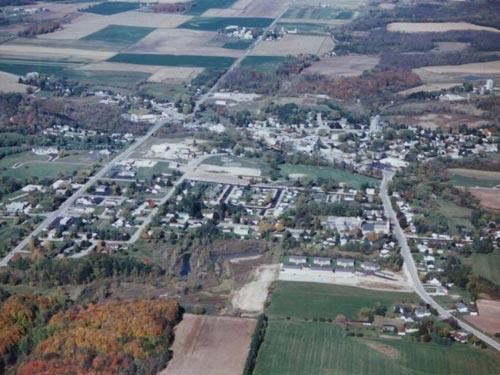
Mishicot, Wisconsin

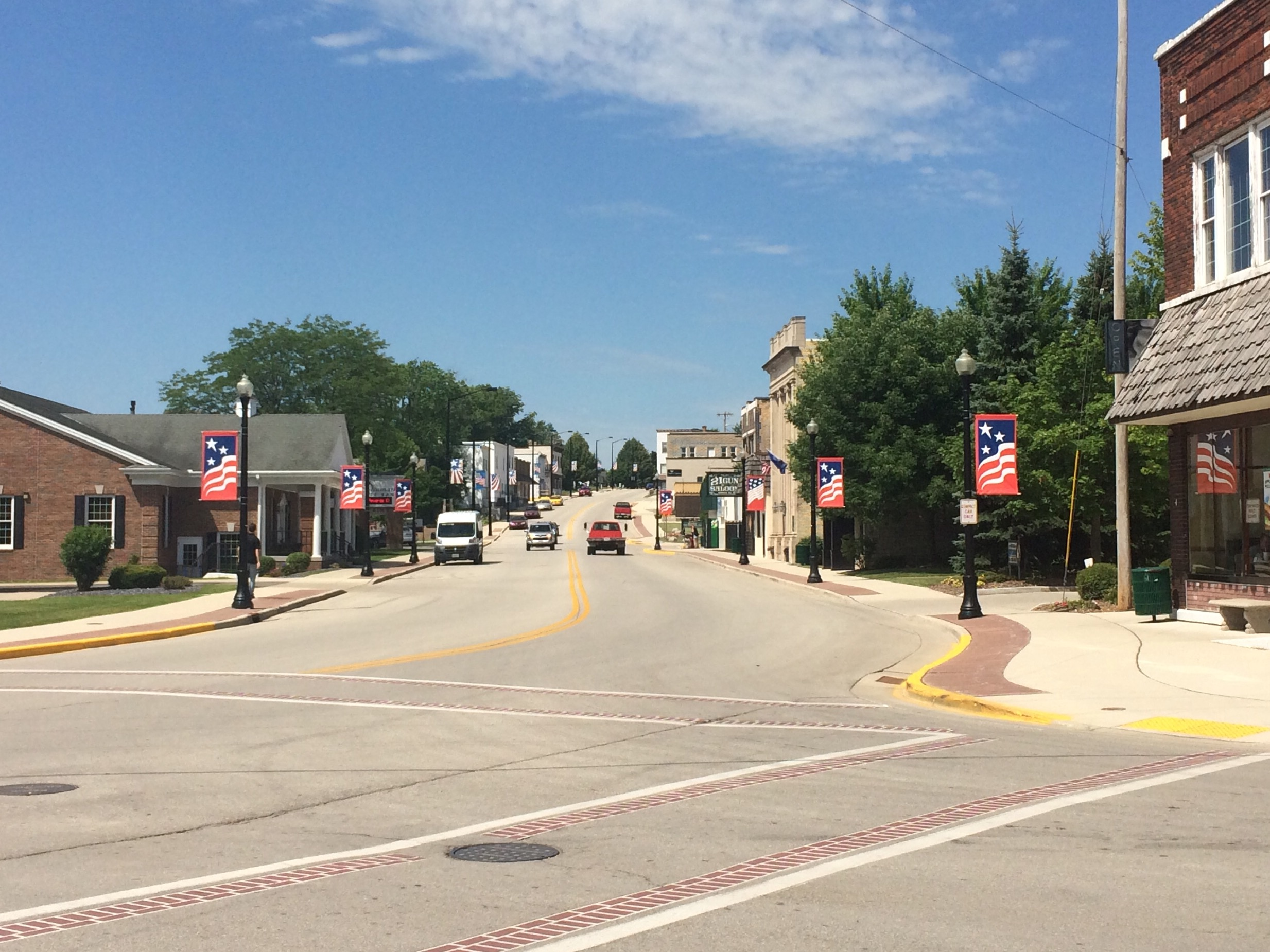
Denmark, Wisconsin

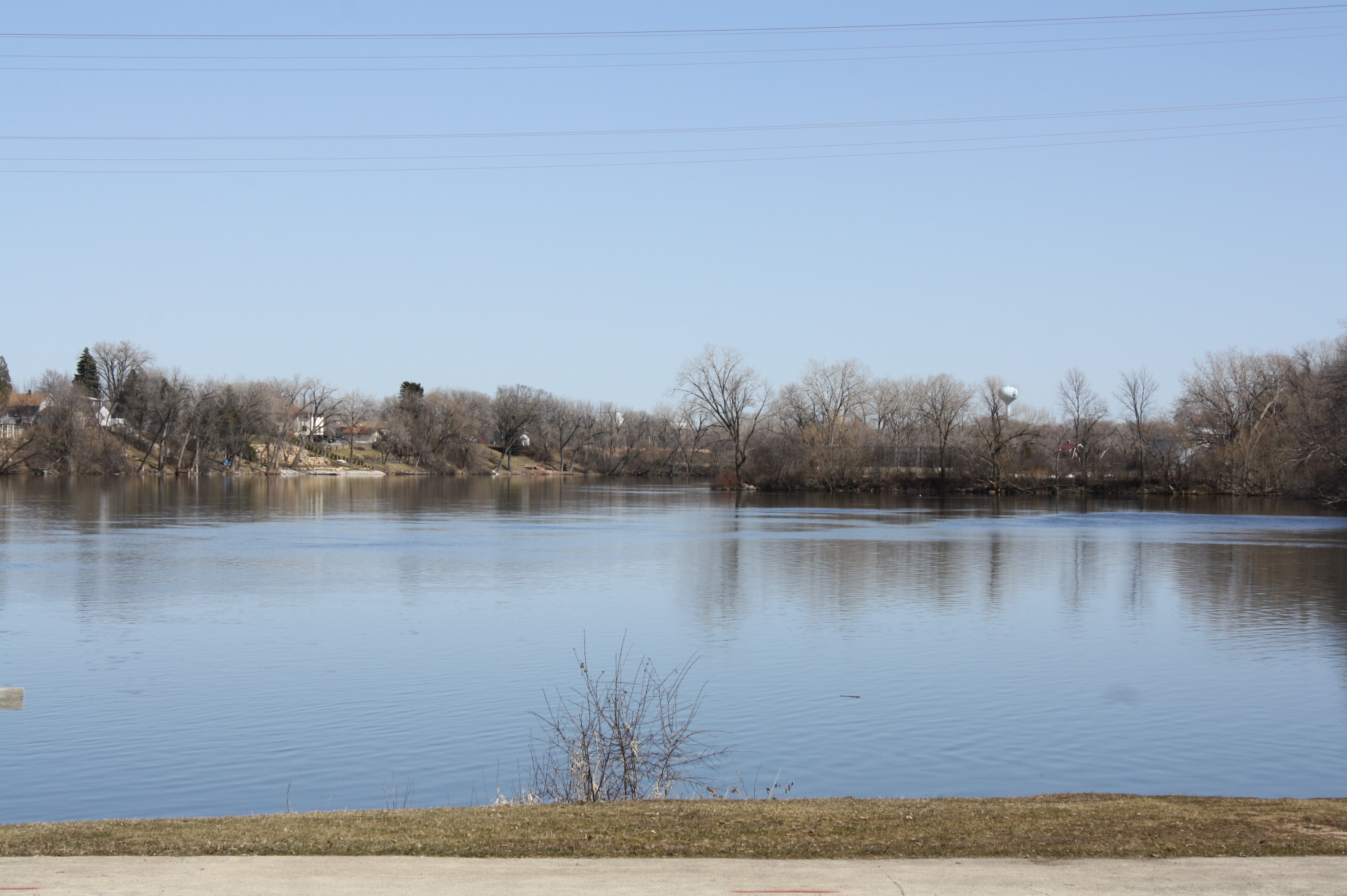
Fox River from Sunset Park in Kimberly

== List of past representatives ==
List of representatives to the Wisconsin State Assembly from the 2nd district
Member	Party	Residence	Term start	Term end	Counties represented	Ref.
District created
Francis J. Lallensack	Dem.	Manitowoc	Manitowoc	January 1, 1973	January 3, 1981	
Vernon W. Holschbach	Dem.	Manitowoc	Manitowoc	January 3, 1981	January 3, 1983	
John Plewa	Dem.	Milwaukee	Milwaukee	January 3, 1983	November 12, 1984	
--Vacant--			Milwaukee	November 12, 1984	January 7, 1985	
Dale Bolle	Dem.	Whitelaw	Brown, Manitowoc	January 7, 1985	January 3, 1995	
Frank Lasee	Rep.	De Pere	Brown, Manitowoc	January 3, 1995	January 5, 2009	
Frank Lasee	Rep.	De Pere	Brown, Kewaunee, Manitowoc	January 3, 1995	January 5, 2009	
Ted Zigmunt	Dem.	Francis Creek	Brown, Kewaunee, Manitowoc	January 5, 2009	January 3, 2011	
André Jacque	Rep.	De Pere	Brown, Kewaunee, Manitowoc	January 3, 2011	January 7, 2019	
André Jacque	Rep.	De Pere	Brown, Manitowoc	January 3, 2011	January 7, 2019	
Shae Sortwell	Rep.	Two Rivers	Brown, Manitowoc	January 7, 2019	Current	
Shae Sortwell	Rep.	Two Rivers	Brown, Manitowoc, Outagamie	January 7, 2019	Current	

== Electoral history ==
Year	Date	Elected				Defeated				Total	Plurality	Other primary candidates
1972	Nov. 7	Francis J. Lallensack	Democratic	9,914	51.86%	Donald K. Helgeson	Rep.	8,848	46.28%	19,118	1,066	Eugene S. Kaufman (Dem.); Joseph G. Laux (Dem.); Robin E. Butler (Dem.)
1972	Nov. 7	Francis J. Lallensack	Democratic	9,914	51.86%	Stanley C. Henschel	Amer.	356	1.86%	19,118	1,066	Eugene S. Kaufman (Dem.); Joseph G. Laux (Dem.); Robin E. Butler (Dem.)
1974	Nov. 5	Francis J. Lallensack (inc)	Democratic	6,636	48.10%	Orabelle Fischer	Rep.	5,710	41.39%	13,796	926	
1974	Nov. 5	Francis J. Lallensack (inc)	Democratic	6,636	48.10%	John L. Krey	Amer.	1,450	10.51%	13,796	926	
1976	Nov. 2	Francis J. Lallensack (inc)	Democratic	11,028	56.56%	Orabelle Fischer	Rep.	8,035	41.21%	19,498	2,993	
1976	Nov. 2	Francis J. Lallensack (inc)	Democratic	11,028	56.56%	Charles L. Stecker	Amer.	435	2.23%	19,498	2,993	
1978	Nov. 7	Francis J. Lallensack (inc)	Democratic	9,485	64.43%	Norbert Rusch	Rep.	5,236	35.57%	14,721	4,249	
1980	Nov. 4	Vernon W. Holschbach	Democratic	10,980	57.13%	Charles W. Kraemer	Rep.	8,239	42.87%	19,219	2,741	Michael P. Dewane (Dem.); Claude R. Barta (Rep.); Robert F. Ziegelbauer (Dem.); Paul A. Mullins (Dem.); Richard J. Rabideau (Dem.); Peter C. Jones (Dem.)
1982	Nov. 2	John Plewa	Democratic	14,012	100.0%	--unopposed--				14,012	14,012	
1984	Nov. 6	Dale Bolle	Democratic	12,065	60.14%	Roger R. Olm	Rep.	7,845	39.11%	20,061	4,220	
1984	Nov. 6	Dale Bolle	Democratic	12,065	60.14%	Eugene T. Welch	Con.	151	0.75%	20,061	4,220	
1986	Nov. 4	Dale Bolle (inc)	Democratic	10,925	100.0%	--unopposed--				10,925	10,925	
1988	Nov. 8	Dale Bolle (inc)	Democratic	13,686	70.55%	James A. Hoffman	Rep.	5,713	29.45%	19,399	7,973	Clement R. Kafta (Rep.)
1990	Nov. 6	Dale Bolle (inc)	Democratic	10,259	100.0%	--unopposed--				10,259	10,259	
1992	Nov. 3	Dale Bolle (inc)	Democratic	13,506	56.90%	Lester Koeppel	Rep.	10,229	43.10%	23,735	3,277	
1994	Nov. 8	Frank Lasee	Republican	9,872	57.94%	Tom Tomaszewski	Dem.	7,166	42.06%	17,038	2,706	Lester Koeppel (Rep.); JoAnn B. Vogel (Rep.); Don Hazaert (Dem.); Mark Heller (Dem.); Gregory J. Erickson (Dem.); Daniel Katers (Dem.)
1996	Nov. 5	Frank Lasee (inc)	Republican	13,345	57.73%	Steve Johnson	Dem.	9,773	42.27%	23,118	3,572	Mark Heller (Dem.)
1998	Nov. 3	Frank Lasee (inc)	Republican	13,348	66.48%	Mark Heller	Dem.	6,729	33.52%	20,077	6,619	
2000	Nov. 7	Frank Lasee (inc)	Republican	20,575	99.53%	--unopposed--				20,673	20,477	
2002	Nov. 5	Frank Lasee (inc)	Republican	10,920	62.53%	Dan Katers	Dem.	6,524	37.36%	17,463	4,396	
2004	Nov. 2	Frank Lasee (inc)	Republican	21,848	61.48%	--unopposed--				21,989	21,707	
2006	Nov. 7	Frank Lasee (inc)	Republican	15,347	89.30%	--unopposed--				17,186	13,508	
2008	Nov. 4	Ted Zigmunt	Democratic	16,008	52.12%	Frank Lasee (inc)	Rep.	14,687	47.82%	30,714	1,321	Lee Brocher (Dem.); Kevin R. Garthwaite (Dem.)
2010	Nov. 2	André Jacque	Republican	13,958	62.23%	Ted Zigmunt (inc)	Dem.	8,456	37.70%	22,429	5,502	Jeff Van Straten (Rep.); Terry Ostrander (Rep.)
2012	Nov. 6	André Jacque (inc)	Republican	17,082	58.62%	Larry Pruess	Dem.	12,033	41.29%	29,141	5,049	
2014	Nov. 4	André Jacque (inc)	Republican	18,994	98.64%	--unopposed--				19,256	18,732	
2016	Nov. 8	André Jacque (inc)	Republican	20,039	69.29%	Mark Grams	Ind.	8,837	30.56%	28,920	11,202	
2018	Nov. 6	Shae Sortwell	Republican	15,014	54.82%	Mark Grams	Dem.	10,118	36.94%	27,389	4,896	Dean Raasch (Rep.)
2018	Nov. 6	Shae Sortwell	Republican	15,014	54.82%	Jeff Dahlke	Ind.	1,494	5.45%	27,389	4,896	Dean Raasch (Rep.)
2018	Nov. 6	Shae Sortwell	Republican	15,014	54.82%	Kevin A. Bauer	Lib.	745	2.72%	27,389	4,896	Dean Raasch (Rep.)
2020	Nov. 3	Shae Sortwell (inc)	Republican	22,244	63.11%	Mark Kiley	Dem.	12,970	36.80%	35,248	9,274	
2022	Nov. 8	Shae Sortwell (inc)	Republican	16,112	59.18%	Renee Gasch	Dem.	11,093	40.74%	27,226	5,019	
2024	Nov. 5	Shae Sortwell (inc)	Republican	23,198	63.22%	Alicia Saunders	Dem.	13,474	36.72%	36,693	9,724	
