= Shae Sortwell =

21st century American politician

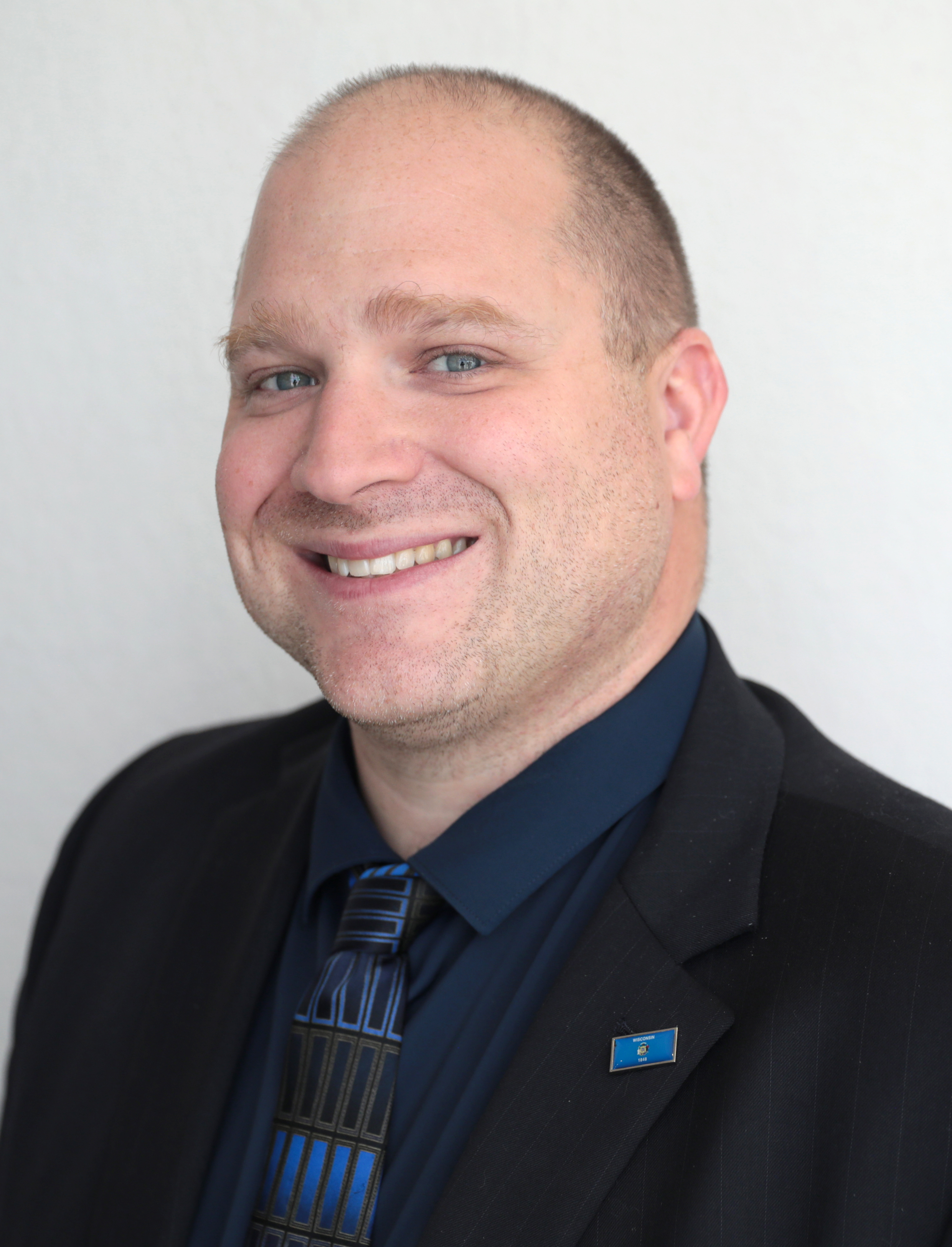

Member of the Wisconsin State Assembly from the 2nd district
- Incumbent
- Assumed office January 7, 2019
- Preceded by: André Jacque

Personal details
- Born: August 3, 1985 (age 40) Saratoga Springs, New York, U.S.
- Party: Republican
- Spouse: Krista R. Van Haren (m. 2007)
- Children: 6
- Education: University of Wisconsin–Green Bay (BA); United States Army CBRN School (Cert.)
- Website: Official website; Campaign website

Military service
- Allegiance: United States
- Branch/service: United States Army; U.S. Army Reserve
- Years of service: 2009–2018
- Rank: Sergeant
- Unit: Chemical Corps

Shae A. Sortwell (born August 3, 1985) is an American truck driver and Republican politician from Green Bay, Wisconsin. He is a member of the Wisconsin State Assembly, representing the 2nd Assembly district since 2019. He previously served on the Green Bay city council and the town board of Gibson, Wisconsin.

== Early life and education ==
Shae Sortwell was born in Saratoga Springs, New York, in 1985. At age 15, he moved with his family to the town of Gibson, Wisconsin in northern Manitowoc County. After graduating from high school, he went on to attend the University of Wisconsin–Green Bay, graduating in 2006 with degrees in public administration and political science. While in college, Sortwell was a member of student government and founded a pro-life student organization.

== Political career ==
After earning his bachelor's degree, he enlisted in the United States Army Reserve and served nine years with the Chemical Corps, rising to the rank of sergeant before his honorable discharge in 2018. During those years, he also became active in local politics, winning election to the Green Bay city council, and then going to work as a legislative aide to state representative Chad Weininger.

In 2014, Sortwell made his first bid for state office, running as an independent candidate for Wisconsin State Assembly in the 90th Assembly district. Sortwell came in a distant third, behind Republican Eric Wimberger and Democratic incumbent Eric Genrich, who won the election.

In 2016, Sortwell pushed an online petition asking Green Bay mayor Jim Schmitt to resign over criminal campaign finance violations. By that time, however, Sortwell had moved back to the town of Gibson. He was elected to the board of supervisors of Gibson in 2017.

=== Wisconsin State Assembly ===
In 2018, after incumbent Andre Jacque announced he would not run for reelection, Sortwell declared his candidacy for Assembly in the 2nd Assembly district. During the campaign, he was endorsed by state senator Alan Lasee and Manitowoc County Executive Bob Ziegelbauer. He defeated Dean Raasch in an August primary for the Republican nomination and won the November election over Democrat Mark Grams, garnering 55 percent of the vote.

After Joe Biden won the 2020 presidential election and Donald Trump refused to concede, Sortwell raised concerns of fraud in the election and urged Congress to delay certification of the election results.

In 2020, Sortwell and another Republican legislator, Paul Tittl, erected a Christmas tree in the capitol rotunda, which had been previously prohibited by governor Tony Evers due to the ongoing COVID-19 pandemic. The two legislators were joined by representatives Dave Murphy and Chuck Wichgers in decorating the tree. Sortwell and Tittl applied for an application to display the tree in the capitol rotunda, but were denied due to a longstanding rule against having such displays on the ground floor, because the capitol was closed to the public due to the pandemic, and because they had not followed the proper procedure for applying for a permit. This stood in contrast with a fellow Republican legislator, Amy Loudenbeck, who was granted permission to place a Christmas tree on the capitol rotunda's first floor.

In 2021 Sortwell garnered controversy due to comparisons he made between Central Wisconsin Children's Museum, based out of Stevens Point, Wisconsin, and Nazi Germany due to a requirement from the museum for unvaccinated people to wear masks, with Sortwell saying "The Gestapo wants to see your papers, please". Due to his comments, the museum received harassment from all across the country. Stevens Point residents asked Sortwell to apologize for his statement, but he stood by his statement about the museum.

In 2025 Sortwell was assigned as vice chair to the Government Oversight Accountability and Transparency (GOAT) Committee, which was modeled off of the Department of Government Efficiency (DOGE). Using the committee, he sent out requests to numerous cities asking for information regarding Diversity, equity, and inclusion programs. Sortwell was criticized by Democratic members of the committee for making these information requests without consulting other members of the committee and due to the lack of a task for the committee to undertake.

== Personal life ==
During Sortwell's childhood, his father was a submariner in the United States Navy.

In 2007, Sortwell married Krista Van Haren. They have six children together.

A controversy emerged in 2021 around an alleged incident from 2013 that Sortwell had abused one of his children after the child was found to have bruises. The investigation conducted by "four police officers, two social workers, a child forensic officer—a trained agent who interviews child victims of physical and sexual abuse—a child advocacy staff member and a nurse practitioner," resulted in law enforcement referring the incident to the district attorney as per department guidelines which almost always will make a referral and let the DA's office decide on the case. However, Deputy District Attorney Dana J. Johnson decided not to pursue charges, citing "the defense of the parent using reasonable force to discipline the child." Sortwell told officers he and his wife disciplined their child with an object when he was being "defiant" because they are commanded to in the Bible.

== Electoral history ==
=== Wisconsin Assembly, 90th district (2014) ===
Year	Election	Date	Elected				Defeated				Total	Plurality
2014	General	Nov. 4	Eric Genrich (inc)	Democratic	7,953	54.94%	Eric Wimberger	Rep.	5,342	36.90%	14,477	2,611
2014	General	Nov. 4	Eric Genrich (inc)	Democratic	7,953	54.94%	Shae Sortwell	Ind.	1,164	8.04%	14,477	2,611

=== Wisconsin Assembly, 2nd district (2018–present) ===
Year	Election	Date	Elected				Defeated				Total	Plurality
2018	Primary	Aug. 14	Shae Sortwell	Republican	2,708	54.88%	Dean Raasch	Rep.	2,221	45.01%	4,934	487
2018	General	Nov. 6	Shae Sortwell	Republican	15,014	54.82%	Mark Grams	Dem.	10,118	36.94%	27,389	4,896
2018	General	Nov. 6	Shae Sortwell	Republican	15,014	54.82%	Jeff Dahlke	Ind.	1,494	5.45%	27,389	4,896
2018	General	Nov. 6	Shae Sortwell	Republican	15,014	54.82%	Kevin A. Bauer	Lib.	745	2.72%	27,389	4,896
2020	General	Nov. 3	Shae Sortwell (inc)	Republican	22,244	63.11%	Mark Kiley	Dem.	12,970	36.80%	35,248	9,274
2022	General	Nov. 8	Shae Sortwell (inc)	Republican	16,112	59.18%	Renee Gasch	Dem.	11,093	40.74%	27,226	5,019
2024	General	Nov. 5	Shae Sortwell (inc)	Republican	23,198	63.22%	Alicia Saunders	Dem.	13,474	36.72%	36,693	9,724

Wisconsin State Assembly
Preceded by André Jacque	Member of the Wisconsin State Assembly from the 2nd district January 7, 2019 – present	Incumbent
