= Don Davey =

American football player (born 1968)

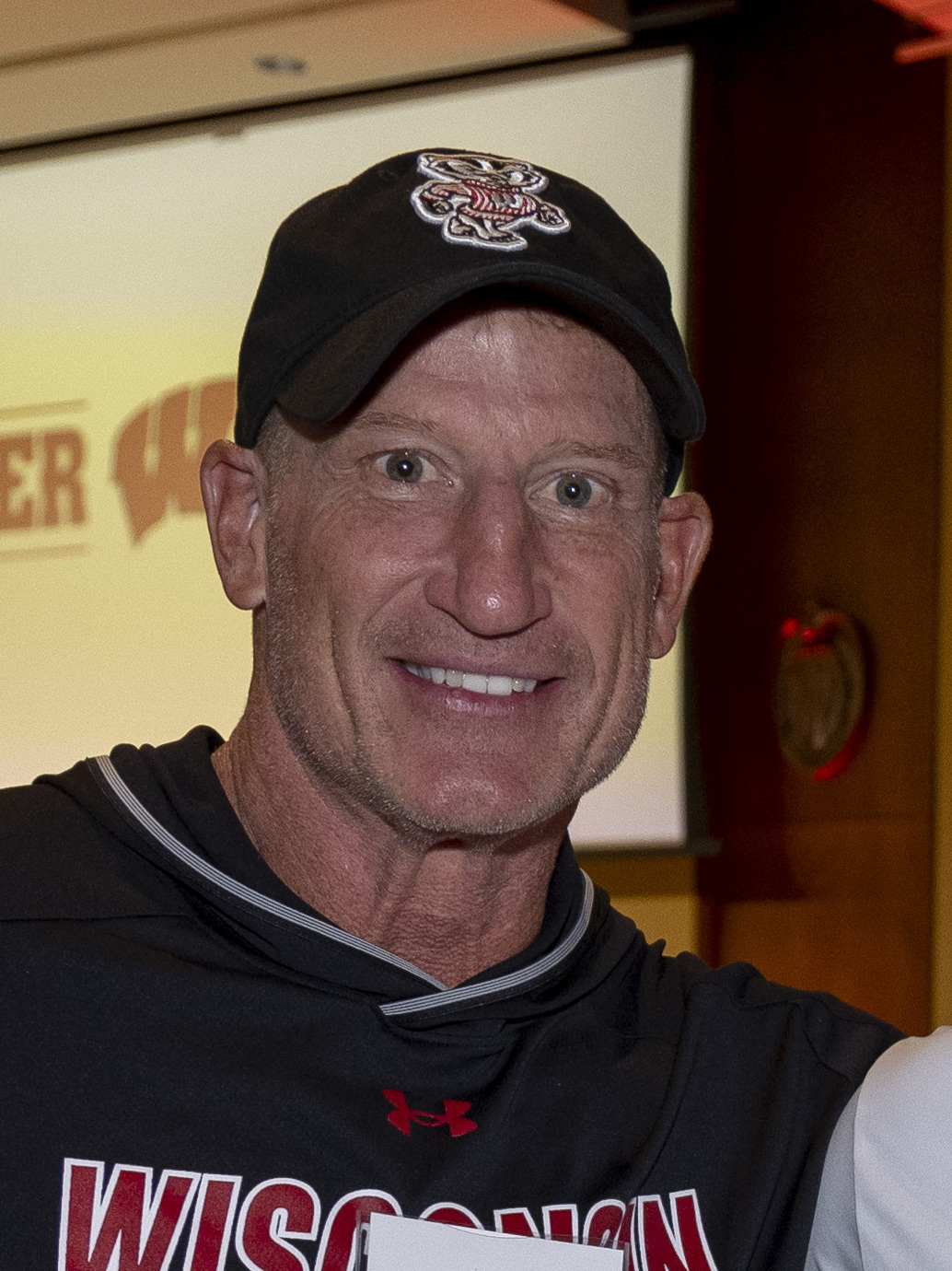
- Davey in 2024

No. 99, 92
- Positions: Defensive tackle, defensive end

Personal information
- Born: April 8, 1968 (age 58); Scottsville, New York, U.S.
- Listed height: 6 ft 4 in (1.93 m)
- Listed weight: 273 lb (124 kg)

Career information
- High school: Manitowoc (WI) Lincoln
- College: Wisconsin
- NFL draft: 1991: 3rd round, 67th overall pick

Career history
- Green Bay Packers (1991–1994); Jacksonville Jaguars (1995–1998)

Awards and highlights
- First-team All-Big Ten (1990)

Career NFL statistics
- Tackles: 130
- Sacks: 8
- Fumble recoveries: 1
- Stats at Pro Football Reference

Donald Vincent Davey (born April 8, 1968) is an American former professional football player who was a defensive tackle in the National Football League (NFL). He was selected by the Green Bay Packers in the third round of the 1991 NFL draft. He attended Manitowoc Lincoln High School where he played football. He played college football for the Wisconsin Badgers. He currently owns Firehouse Subs restaurants in Wisconsin and Florida.

Davey also played for the Jacksonville Jaguars.
