= Wisconsin's 25th Assembly district =

American legislative district in eastern Wisconsin

Wisconsin's 25th State Assembly district
- 2024 map defined in 2023 Wisc. Act 94; 22022 map defined in Johnson v. Wisconsin Elections Commission; 2011 map was defined in 2011 Wisc. Act 43
Assemblymember
Paul Tittl; R–Manitowoc
since January 7, 2013 (13 years)
- Demographics: 88.01% White; 1.8% Black; 4.17% Hispanic; 3.53% Asian; 1.94% Native American; 0.07% Hawaiian/Pacific Islander
- Population (2020) • Voting age: 59,611; 47,409
- Website: Official website
- Notes: Eastern Wisconsin

The 25th Assembly district of Wisconsin is one of 99 districts in the Wisconsin State Assembly. Located in eastern Wisconsin, the district comprises eastern Manitowoc County and part of northeast Sheboygan County. It includes all of the cities of Manitowoc and Two Rivers, as well as the village of Cleveland. It also contains the Whistling Straits golf course. The district is represented by Republican Paul Tittl, since January 2013.

The 25th Assembly district is located within Wisconsin's 9th Senate district, along with the 26th and 27th Assembly districts.

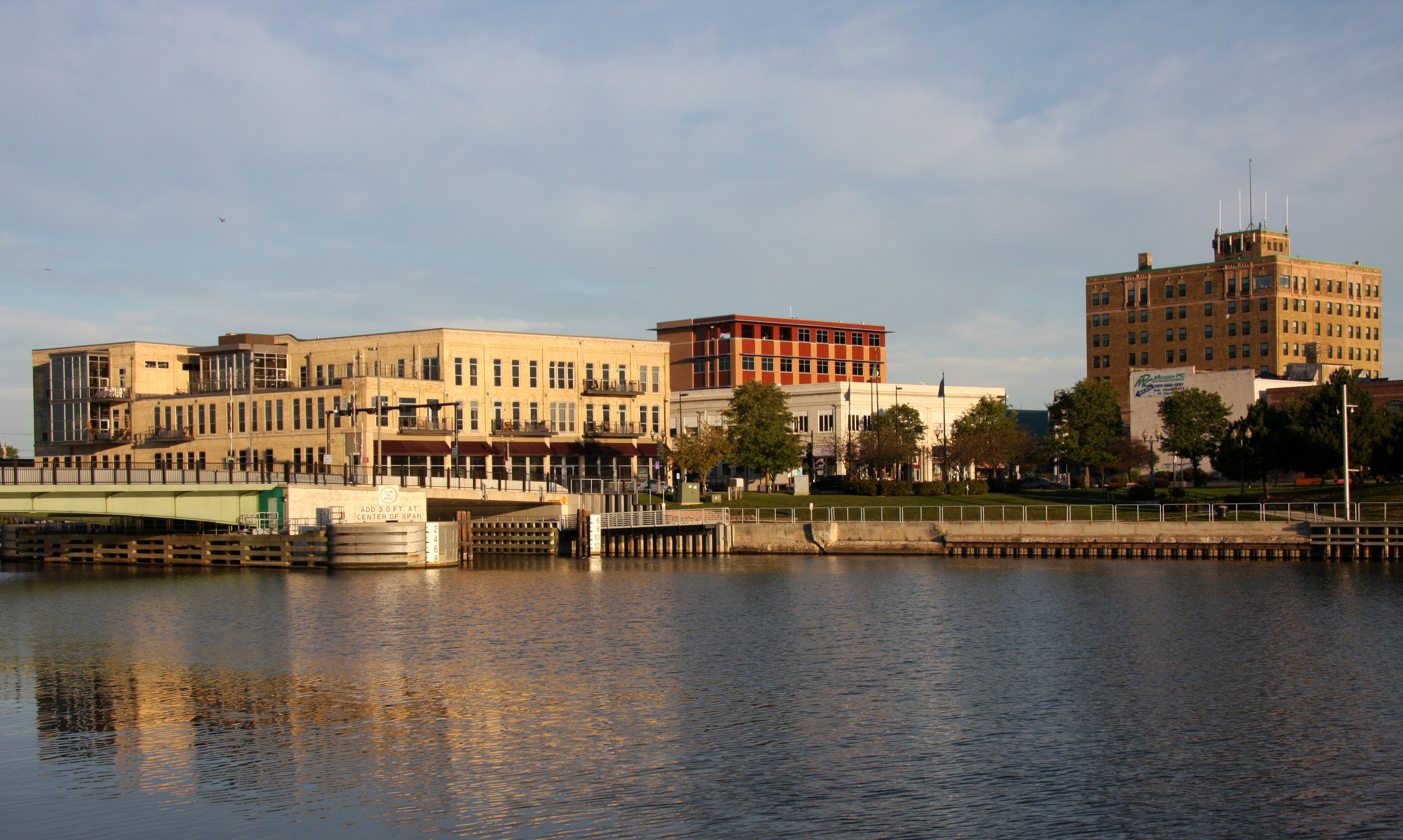
Manitowoc

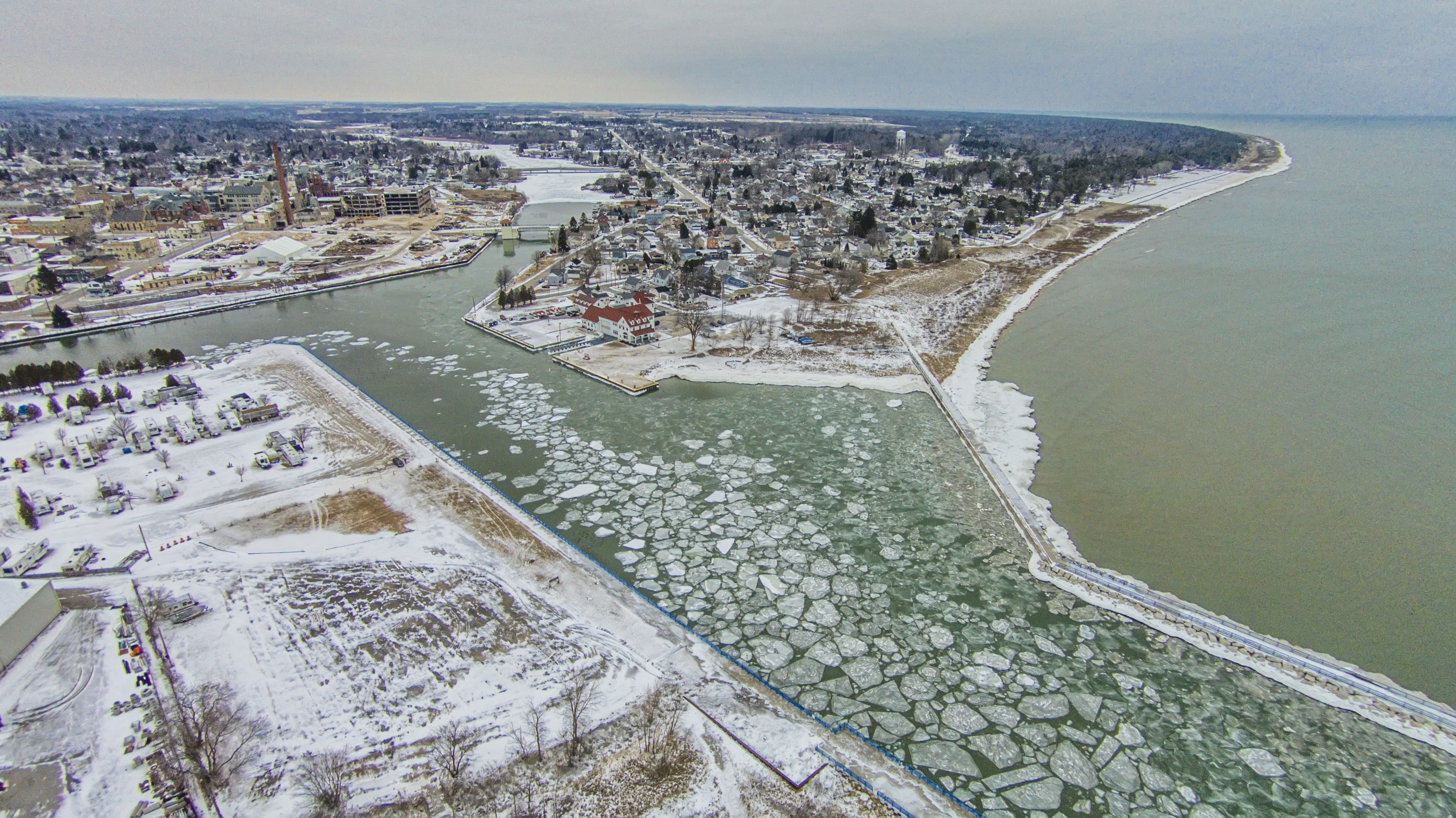
Two Rivers harbor

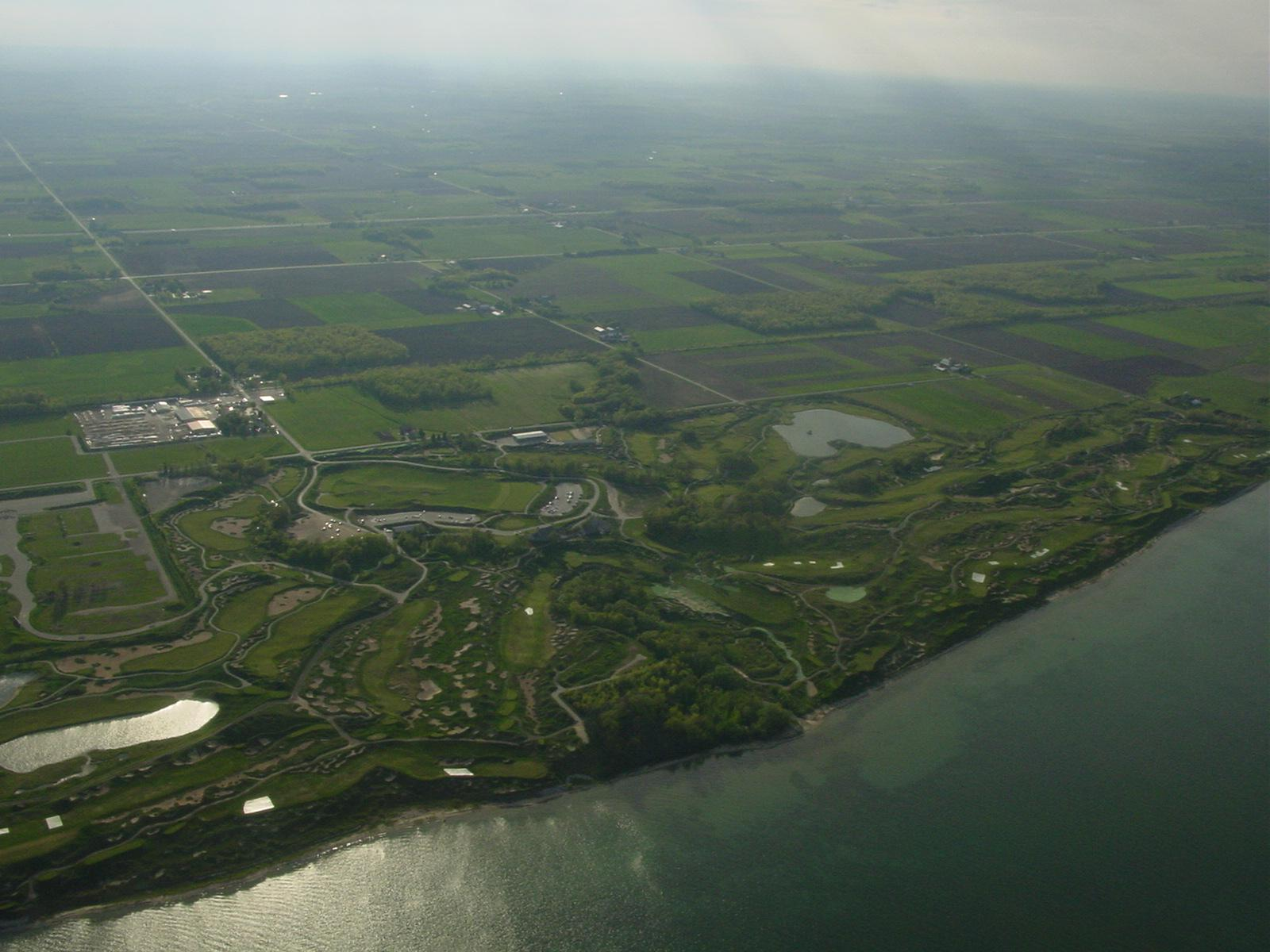
Aerial view of Whistling Straits golf course

== List of past representatives ==
List of representatives to the Wisconsin State Assembly from the 25th district
Member	Party	Residence	Counties represented	Term start	Term end	Ref.
District created
Dennis Conta	Dem.	Milwaukee	Milwaukee	January 1, 1973	January 3, 1977	
Jim Moody	Dem.	Milwaukee	Milwaukee	January 3, 1977	January 1, 1979	
Barbara Ulichny	Dem.	Milwaukee	Milwaukee	January 1, 1979	January 3, 1983	
Gary K. Johnson	Dem.	Beloit	Rock	January 3, 1983	January 7, 1985	
Vernon W. Holschbach	Dem.	Manitowoc	Manitowoc	January 7, 1985	January 3, 1993	
Bob Ziegelbauer	Dem.	Manitowoc	Calumet, Manitowoc	January 3, 1993	June 21, 2010	
Bob Ziegelbauer	Ind.	Manitowoc	Calumet, Manitowoc	June 21, 2010	January 7, 2013	
Paul Tittl	Rep.	Manitowoc	Calumet, Manitowoc	January 7, 2013	January 6, 2025	
Paul Tittl	Rep.	Manitowoc	Manitowoc, Sheboygan	January 6, 2025	Current	
