= Dale Bolle =

American politician

Member of the Wisconsin State Assembly
- In office January 7, 1985 – January 3, 1995
- Preceded by: John Plewa
- Succeeded by: Frank Lasee
- Constituency: 2nd district
- In office January 3, 1983 – January 7, 1985
- Preceded by: June Jaronitzky
- Succeeded by: William Plizka
- Constituency: 74th district

Personal details
- Born: Dale Joseph Bolle; June 12, 1923 Manitowoc County, Wisconsin
- Died: December 12, 2007 (aged 84) Whitelaw, Wisconsin
- Party: Democratic

Dale Joseph Bolle (June 12, 1923 – December 12, 2007) was a member of the Wisconsin State Assembly.

== Biography ==
Bolle was born Dale Joseph Bolle on June 12, 1923, in Manitowoc County, Wisconsin. He went on to graduate from Lincoln High School in Manitowoc, Wisconsin. During World War II and the Korean War, Bolle served in the United States Army. He was awarded a Bronze Star with Oak Leaf Cluster for heroism and a Purple Heart during World War II . Afterwards, he was a member of the United States Army Reserve, later retiring with the rank of captain. He owned Bolle Trucking Company for more than 30 years.

Bolle died on December 12, 2007, in Whitelaw, Wisconsin, and is buried in Francis Creek, Wisconsin. He was married to Ethelyn Junk for 61 years. They had two children, Wayne and Allen Bolle, he died with three grand children, Luke Bolle, Angela Konrad nee Bolle, and Jesse Bolle, with two great granddaughters Kaitlyn Bolle, and Madison Konrad.

== Political career ==
Bolle was first elected to the Assembly in 1982. He was a member of the Assembly until 1995, at which time he was succeeded by Frank Lasee. Additionally, Bolle was a member of the Manitowoc County Board from 1970 to 1980. He was a Democrat.
