= Martha J. Fleischman =

American art dealer

- Occupation: Art dealer

Martha J. Fleischman is an American art dealer and the former publisher of The American Art Journal. She is the president of the Kennedy Galleries. Fleischman served as a board member of New York Public Radio and Science Friday Initiative . She is a trustee of the Archives of American Art at the Smithsonian Institution, as well as The Morgan Library and Museum. She is the former board member of the Art Dealers Association of America. Her father was Lawrence A. Fleischman.
