= John Plewa =

20th century American politician

John R. Plewa

Member of the Wisconsin Senate from the 7th district
- In office November 13, 1984 – September 13, 1995
- Preceded by: Jerry Kleczka
- Succeeded by: Richard Grobschmidt

Member of the Wisconsin State Assembly
- In office January 3, 1983 – November 12, 1984
- Preceded by: Vernon W. Holschbach
- Succeeded by: Dale Bolle
- Constituency: 2nd district
- In office January 1, 1973 – January 3, 1983
- Preceded by: District established
- Succeeded by: James F. Rooney
- Constituency: 20th district

Personal details
- Born: September 22, 1945 Milwaukee, Wisconsin, U.S.
- Died: September 13, 1995 (aged 49) John L. Doyne Hospital; Wauwatosa, Wisconsin, U.S.
- Cause of death: Cancer
- Resting place: St. Adalbert Cemetery, Milwaukee, Wisconsin
- Party: Democratic
- Spouse: Susan
- Children: 2 sons
- Education: University of Wisconsin–Whitewater (B.S.)
- Profession: teacher, politician

John R. Plewa (September 22, 1945 – September 13, 1995) was an American educator and Democratic politician from Wisconsin. He served 10 years in the Wisconsin State Senate and 12 years in the State Assembly, representing Milwaukee. Plewa is most well-known for authoring Wisconsin's 1988 family and medical leave law.

== Biography ==
Born in Milwaukee, Wisconsin, Plewa graduated from Milwaukee's Don Bosco High School in 1963. He went on to earn his bachelor's degree from the University of Wisconsin–Whitewater in 1968. Following his graduation, he worked as a teacher at the Milwaukee Area Technical College and was a member of the United Steelworkers union.

In 1970, he was a candidate in a four-way primary which unseated incumbent state senator Leland McParland, losing to Kurt Frank. In 1972, Plewa was elected to the Wisconsin State Assembly serving until 1984, when he was elected to the Wisconsin State Senate in a special election after incumbent Jerry Kleczka was elected to the Congressional seat long held by Clement Zablocki.

He was a member of the Cudahy Jaycees, and the United Steelworkers Union. The Lake Parkway of Wisconsin Highway 794 was named in memory of Senator Plewa.

Wisconsin State Assembly
New district	Member of the Wisconsin State Assembly from the 20th district January 1, 1973 – January 3, 1983	Succeeded by James F. Rooney
Preceded by Vernon W. Holschbach	Member of the Wisconsin State Assembly from the 2nd district January 3, 1983 – November 12, 1984	Succeeded by Dale Bolle
Wisconsin Senate
Preceded by Jerry Kleczka	Member of the Wisconsin Senate from the 7th district November 13, 1984 – September 13, 1995	Succeeded by Richard Grobschmidt
