= Caleb Frostman =

American politician (born 1984)

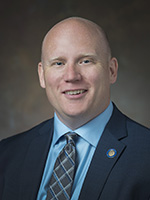

Chief of Staff to the Dane County Executive
- Incumbent
- Assumed office March 23, 2026
- Appointed by: Melissa Agard
- Deputy: Aaron Collins
- Preceded by: Joshua Wescott

6th Secretary of the Wisconsin Department of Workforce Development
- In office January 7, 2019 – September 18, 2020
- Appointed by: Tony Evers
- Deputy: Robert Cherry, Jr.
- Preceded by: Ray Allen
- Succeeded by: Amy Pechacek

Member of the Wisconsin Senate from the 1st district
- In office June 28, 2018 – January 7, 2019
- Preceded by: Frank Lasee
- Succeeded by: André Jacque

Personal details
- Born: November 22, 1984 (age 41) Stevens Point, Wisconsin, U.S.
- Party: Democratic
- Education: Wisconsin School of Business
- Website: Official website

Caleb Frostman (born November 22, 1984) is an American politician from the state of Wisconsin who has served as chief of staff to Dane County Executive Melissa Agard since 2026. He was Secretary of the Wisconsin Department of Workforce Development in the administration of Governor Tony Evers from 2019 until his resignation on September 18, 2020. A Democrat, he previously served as a member of the Wisconsin State Senate representing the 1st district.

== Biography ==
Frostman is a native of Green Bay, Wisconsin. He worked for banks in the Minneapolis–Saint Paul area and moved to Sturgeon Bay, Wisconsin, in 2016, where he worked for the Door County Economic Development Corporation as their executive director. After Lasee, a Republican, resigned his seat in the Wisconsin Senate, Frostman resigned from his job to run in the special election to fill the vacancy. On June 12, Frostman defeated André Jacque to win the seat. He was sworn in on June 28, 2018. He was later defeated by Jacque in November 2018, losing the chance of being elected for a full four-year term. Governor Tony Evers appointed him as Secretary of the Wisconsin Department of Workforce Development, though he remained secretary-designee until the Republican-controlled Wisconsin Senate approved his appointment at the start of 2020.

On September 18, 2020, Evers asked for Frostman's resignation, due to long-term issues involving the approval of payment of benefits to applicants during the COVID-19 pandemic which dated back to before the state's first stay-at-home order. Frostman tendered his resignation soon after.

== Electoral history ==
=== Wisconsin Senate (2018) ===
Year	Election	Date	Elected				Defeated				Total	Plurality
2018 (special)	Special	Jun. 12	Caleb Frostman	Democratic	14,606	51.38%	André Jacque	Rep.	13,801	48.55%	28,427	805
2018	General	Nov. 6	André Jacque	Republican	47,826	54.50%	Caleb Frostman (inc)	Dem.	39,414	45.43%	86,768	7,875

Wisconsin Senate
Preceded by Frank Lasee	Member of the Wisconsin Senate from the 1st district 2018 – 2019	Succeeded by André Jacque
Political offices
Preceded by Ray Allen	Secretary of the Wisconsin Department of Workforce Development; 2019 – 2020	Succeeded by Amy Pechacek
