= Bob Ziegelbauer =

American politician (born 1951)

Executive of Manitowoc County, Wisconsin
- In office April 18, 2006 – April 21, 2026
- Preceded by: Dan Fischer
- Succeeded by: Tyler Martell

Member of the Wisconsin State Assembly from the 25th district
- In office January 3, 1993 – January 7, 2013
- Preceded by: Vernon W. Holschbach
- Succeeded by: Paul Tittl

Member of the Board of Supervisors of Manitowoc County, Wisconsin
- In office 1982–1988

Personal details
- Born: August 26, 1951 (age 75) Manitowoc, Wisconsin, U.S.
- Party: Democratic (1993–2010); Independent (2010–present)
- Education: University of Notre Dame; Wharton Business School

Robert F. Ziegelbauer (born August 26, 1951) is an American politician from Manitowoc County, Wisconsin. He is the current county executive of Manitowoc County, serving in that role since April 2006. He previously served as a member of the Wisconsin State Assembly, representing the 25th Assembly district from 1993 to 2013. Politically, Ziegelbauer was originally elected to office as a member of the Democratic Party, but has been an independent since 2010.

== Early life and career ==
Born in Manitowoc, Wisconsin, Ziegelbauer graduated from Roncalli High School. He then graduated from the University of Notre Dame and received his masters from Wharton School of the University of Pennsylvania. Ziegelbauer was a business owner. He was finance director of the city of Manitowoc; he also was on the Manitowoc County board of supervisors and the Manitowoc Common Council. Ziegelbauer also taught at Silver Lake College.

== Wisconsin State Assembly ==
In mid 1992, Vernon Holschbach announced he would not seek re-election to a seventh term. His son ran a campaign to succeed him, but was defeated by Ziegelbauer, who had run for the nomination against the elder Holschbach in 1980 and 1982, being defeated both times.

=== 2009 state budget ===
Having been one of the more conservative members of the Democratic Caucus, Ziegelbauer would often dissent with Democratic leaders and vote with Republicans on key issues. One particular flashpoint of this tension was in 2009, when, during a debate on the 2009 state budget, he voted for a Republican amendment to restrict abortion in the state. As a result he was removed as chairman of the Assembly Ways and Means Committee.

=== Split with the Democrats and retirement ===
In years past Ziegelbauer had also faced criticism from his Democratic colleagues for his votes with Republicans on the issues of taxation and abortion, as well as for his support for John Gard over Steve Kagen in the 2006 House of Representatives elections in Wisconsin.

Ziegelbauer announced on June 21, 2010 that he would run as an independent for the 2010 election.

On November 2, 2010, Ziegelbauer was reelected to the Wisconsin Assembly. After being re-elected, it was unclear who Ziegelbauer would caucus with, but eventually he stated that he would caucus with the Republicans.

In 2012 Ziegelbauer announced he would not run for reelection to the Assembly. He was succeeded by Paul Tittl.

== Manitowoc County executive ==
Ziegelbauer was elected County Executive of Manitowoc County in April 2006. He has since been reelected as County Executive in 2010, 2014, 2018, and 2022 for a total of five terms.

In 2018, Ziegelbauer endorsed Republican André Jacque's bid for the 1st district in the Wisconsin Senate and Republican Shae Sortwell's bid for state assembly in the 2nd district in the state assembly.

Ziegelbauer left office in 2026.

== Electoral history ==
=== Wisconsin Assembly, 2nd district (1980) ===
Year	Election	Date	Elected				Defeated				Total	Plurality
1980	Primary	Sep. 9	Vernon W. Holschbach	Democratic	1,781	28.61%	Michael P. Dewane	Dem.	1,523	24.46%	6,226	258
1980	Primary	Sep. 9	Vernon W. Holschbach	Democratic	1,781	28.61%	Robert F. Ziegelbauer	Dem.	1,191	19.13%	6,226	258
1980	Primary	Sep. 9	Vernon W. Holschbach	Democratic	1,781	28.61%	Paul A. Mullins	Dem.	1,056	16.96%	6,226	258
1980	Primary	Sep. 9	Vernon W. Holschbach	Democratic	1,781	28.61%	Richard J. Rabideau	Dem.	427	6.86%	6,226	258
1980	Primary	Sep. 9	Vernon W. Holschbach	Democratic	1,781	28.61%	Peter C. Jones	Dem.	248	3.98%	6,226	258

=== Wisconsin Assembly, 76th district (1982) ===
Year	Election	Date	Elected				Defeated				Total	Plurality
1982	Primary	Sep. 14	Vernon W. Holschbach	Democratic	4,032	59.43%	Robert F. Ziegelbauer	Dem.	2,753	40.57%	6,785	1,279

=== Wisconsin Assembly, 25th district (1992–2010) ===
Year	Election	Date	Elected				Defeated				Total	Plurality
1992	Primary	Sep. 8	Robert F. Ziegelbauer	Democratic	5,564	51.94%	Todd R. Holschbach	Dem.	2,555	23.85%	10,713	3,009
1992	Primary	Sep. 8	Robert F. Ziegelbauer	Democratic	5,564	51.94%	Gerard F. Powalisz	Dem.	1,914	17.86%	10,713	3,009
1992	Primary	Sep. 8	Robert F. Ziegelbauer	Democratic	5,564	51.94%	Michael R. Rusch	Dem.	680	6.35%	10,713	3,009
1992	General	Nov. 3	Robert F. Ziegelbauer	Democratic	15,020	61.25%	Jon Hochkammer	Rep.	9,503	38.75%	24,523	5,517
1994	General	Nov. 8	Bob Ziegelbauer (inc)	Democratic	11,647	100%	--unopposed--				11,647	N/A
1996	General	Nov. 5	Bob Ziegelbauer (inc)	Democratic	14,771	100%	--unopposed--				14,771	N/A
1998	General	Nov. 3	Bob Ziegelbauer (inc)	Democratic	11,893	96.83%	Wim van Der Graaf	Con.	389	3.17%	12,282	11,504
2000	General	Nov. 7	Bob Ziegelbauer (inc)	Democratic	18,528	99.58%	--unopposed--				18,607	18,449
2002	General	Nov. 5	Bob Ziegelbauer (inc)	Democratic	12,701	99.61%	--unopposed--				12,751	12,651
2004	Primary	Sep. 14	Bob Ziegelbauer (inc)	Democratic	3,375	70.61%	Anne-Marie Suchomel Woznicki	Dem.	1,405	29.39%	4,780	1,970
2004	General	Nov. 2	Bob Ziegelbauer (inc)	Democratic	20,268	99.50%	--unopposed--				20,369	20,167
2006	Primary	Sep. 12	Bob Ziegelbauer (inc)	Democratic	3,684	61.50%	Anne-Marie Suchomel Woznicki	Dem.	2,306	38.50%	5,990	1,378
2006	General	Nov. 7	Bob Ziegelbauer (inc)	Democratic	11,163	54.00%	Paul Tittl	Rep.	8,557	41.39%	20,672	2,606
2008	General	Nov. 4	Bob Ziegelbauer (inc)	Democratic	19,690	98.85%	--unopposed--				19,920	19,460
2010	General	Nov. 2	Bob Ziegelbauer (inc)	Independent	9,702	49.77%	Kerry Trask	Dem.	6,459	33.13%	19,495	3,243
2010	General	Nov. 2	Bob Ziegelbauer (inc)	Independent	9,702	49.77%	Andrew Wisniewski	Rep.	3,325	17.06%	19,495	3,243
