= Francis J. Lallensack =

American politician

Member of the Wisconsin State Assembly from the 2nd district
- In office January 1, 1973 – January 3, 1981
- Preceded by: District created
- Succeeded by: Vernon W. Holschbach

Personal details
- Born: January 16, 1916 Manitowoc, Wisconsin
- Died: January 5, 1999 (aged 82)
- Party: Democratic

Francis J. Lallensack (1916–1999) was a member of the Wisconsin State Assembly.

== Biography ==
Lallensack was born on January 16, 1916, in Manitowoc, Wisconsin. He would become a police officer. During World War II, he served in the United States Army. Lallensack died on December 5, 1999.

== Political career ==
Lallensack was a member of the Assembly from 1973 to 1981. He was a Democrat.
