= Ted Zigmunt =

American politician

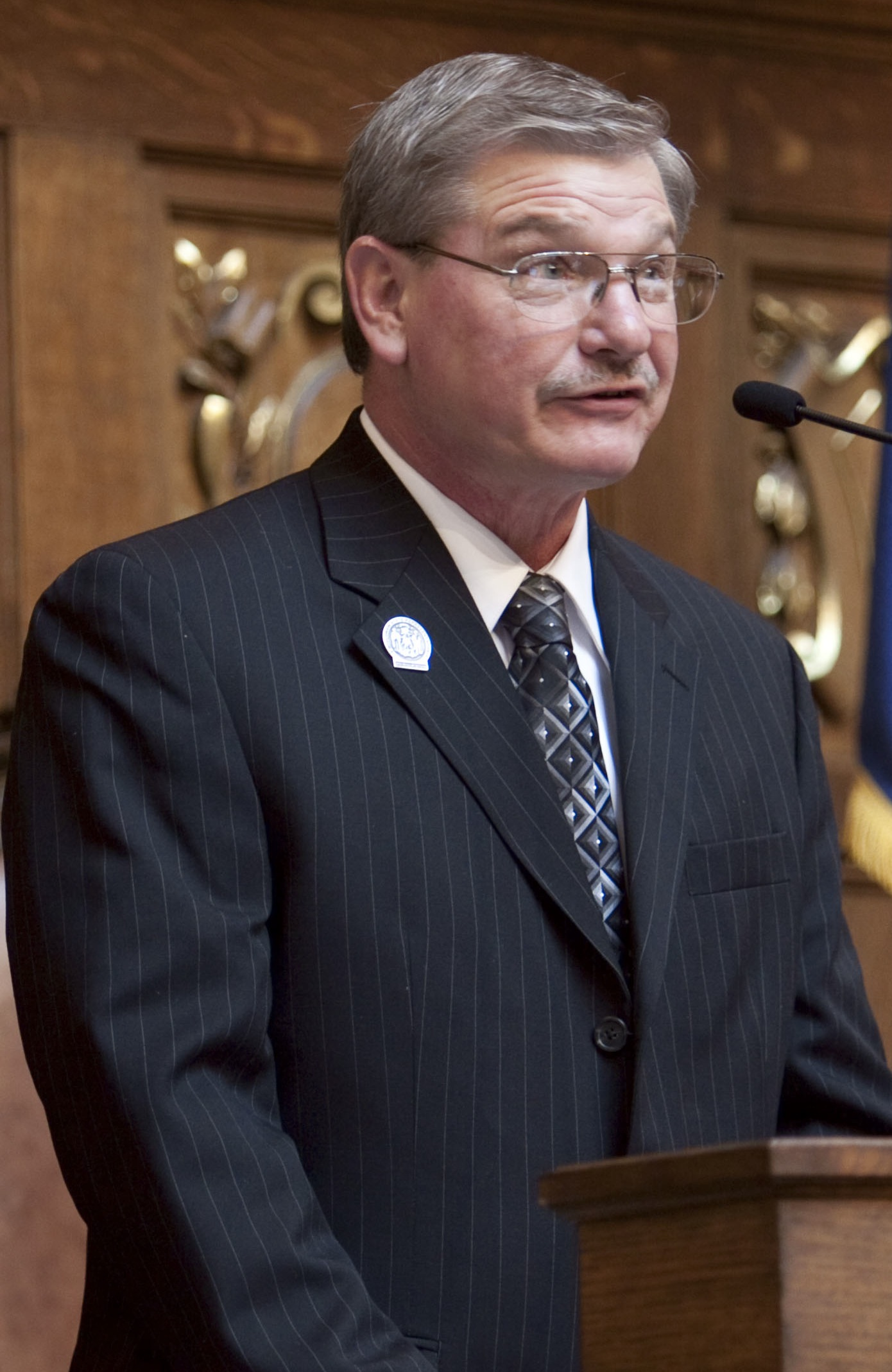
- Zigmunt in 2009

Member of the Wisconsin State Assembly from the 2nd district
- In office January 5, 2009 – January 3, 2011
- Preceded by: Frank Lasee
- Succeeded by: Andre Jacque

Personal details
- Born: December 8, 1951 (age 74) Manitowoc, Wisconsin
- Party: Democratic
- Spouse: Lynn
- Occupation: Politician, radio announcer, salesperson

Ted Zigmunt is a former Democratic Party member of the Wisconsin State Assembly, representing the 2nd Assembly District after defeating incumbent Frank Lasee in the November 2008 election.

== Career ==
In the Democratic primary Zigmunt narrowly won the nomination, with the initial counts having his lead at four votes. His closest primary opponent, Lee Brocher, requested a recount which expanded his lead to 7 votes.

Zigmunt went into the general election as an underdog, and several pundits believed Lasee was the favorite to win, due in part to the partisan lean of the district and his personal style, as well as Zigmunt's support from the state teachers' union, WEAC.

On November 2, 2010, Zigmunt was defeated by Republican nominee Andre Jacque.

Zigmunt served as the Village President of Francis Creek, Wisconsin from 2004 to 2018.

== Electoral history ==
=== Wisconsin Assembly (2008, 2010) ===
Year	Election	Date	Elected				Defeated				Total	Plurality
2008	Primary	Sep. 9	Ted Zigmunt	Democratic	649	36.90%	Lee Brocher	Dem.	642	36.50%	1,759	7
2008	Primary	Sep. 9	Ted Zigmunt	Democratic	649	36.90%	Kevin R. Garthwaite	Dem.	464	26.38%	1,759	7
2008	General	Nov. 4	Ted Zigmunt	Democratic	16,008	52.12%	Frank Lasee (inc)	Rep.	14,687	47.82%	30,714	1,321
2010	General	Nov. 2	André Jacque	Republican	13,958	62.23%	Ted Zigmunt (inc)	Dem.	8,456	37.70%	22,429	5,502

Wisconsin State Assembly
Preceded by Frank Lasee	Wisconsin State Representative - 2nd District; 2009 – 2011	Succeeded by Andre Jacque
