= Kerry Trask =

American historian and author (born 1941)

Kerry A. Trask (born October 17, 1941) is an American historian and author. Trask has worked as a history professor at the University of Wisconsin Manitowoc for more than thirty years. Trask was also the Democratic candidate for the Wisconsin State Assembly from the 25th District in the 2010 general election.

== Career ==
Kerry Trask was born in Orillia, Ontario, to Victor Arnold and Lillian Trask. He worked his way through college in steel foundries, dairy farms, and as a ranger with the Ontario Department of Lands and Forests. Trask earned his B.A. in American History, from Hamline University in St. Paul, Minnesota. He went on to earn his M.A. and Ph.D. in American History from the University of Minnesota, Minneapolis. Shortly after earning his Ph.D. in American History, Trask joined the faculty of the University of Wisconsin Manitowoc.

During his 36 years at the UW Manitowoc, Trask served as history professor, History Department chair for all 13 University of Wisconsin Colleges, interim dean for the University of Wisconsin Sheboygan, chair of the Appeals and Grievances Committee for the UW Colleges, a member of the Board of Advisors to the UW System’s Institute on Race and Ethnicity. He was also a member of the AFL-CIO Academic Rights and Freedom Committee. He was named professor emeritus of history at the University of Wisconsin Manitowoc, and is a fellow of the Wisconsin Academy of Sciences, Arts and Letters, and a scholar-advisor to the Black Earth Institute.

Among other books Trask wrote Black Hawk: The Battle for the Heart of America. He has also had his work published in magazines and scholarly publications including The Wisconsin Magazine of History, The American Historical Review, and The William and Mary Quarterly, among others. He is the reviews editor for Voyageur: Northeastern Wisconsin’s Historical Review. In addition, Trask has done work with Wisconsin Public Television. In 2009 he was a consultant and on-film commentator for Wisconsin Hometown Stories: Manitowoc and Two Rivers. Two years prior he was featured as an on-film commentator for The Black Hawk War, an episode of Wisconsin Public Television’s weekly program, In Wisconsin.

His work has been awarded in several different forums. In 2006, he received the Benjamin F. Shambaugh Award from the State Historical Society of Iowa for Black Hawk: The Battle for the Heart of America. The same year he was named a Library Resident Fellow with the American Philosophical Society.

== State assembly campaign ==
Trask ran as the Democrat in the 25th District race for Wisconsin State Assembly in the November 2010 general election. He was defeated in that race by Independent candidate Bob Ziegelbauer. Ziegelbauer won with 49.77% of the vote, while Trask managed 33.13% of the vote. The Republican candidate, Andrew Wisniewski, collected 17.06% of the votes.

== Electoral history ==
=== Wisconsin Assembly (2010) ===
Year	Election	Date	Elected				Defeated				Total	Plurality
2010	General	Nov. 2	Bob Ziegelbauer (inc)	Independent	9,702	49.77%	Kerry Trask	Dem.	6,459	33.13%	19,495	3,243
2010	General	Nov. 2	Bob Ziegelbauer (inc)	Independent	9,702	49.77%	Andrew Wisniewski	Rep.	3,325	17.06%	19,495	3,243

=== Wisconsin Assembly (2020) ===
Year	Election	Date	Elected				Defeated				Total	Plurality
2020	General	Nov. 3	Paul Tittl (inc)	Republican	19,593	64.63%	Kerry Trask	Dem.	10,703	35.31%	30,314	8,890

== Selected publications ==
=== Books ===
- In the Pursuit of Shadows: Massachusetts Millennialism and the Seven Years' War
- Fire Within: A Civil War Narrative from Wisconsin (Kent State UP, 1995) ISBN 0873385195
- Black Hawk: The Battle for the Heart of America (Henry Holt, 2006) ISBN 0805077588
