= Lincoln High School (Manitowoc, Wisconsin) =

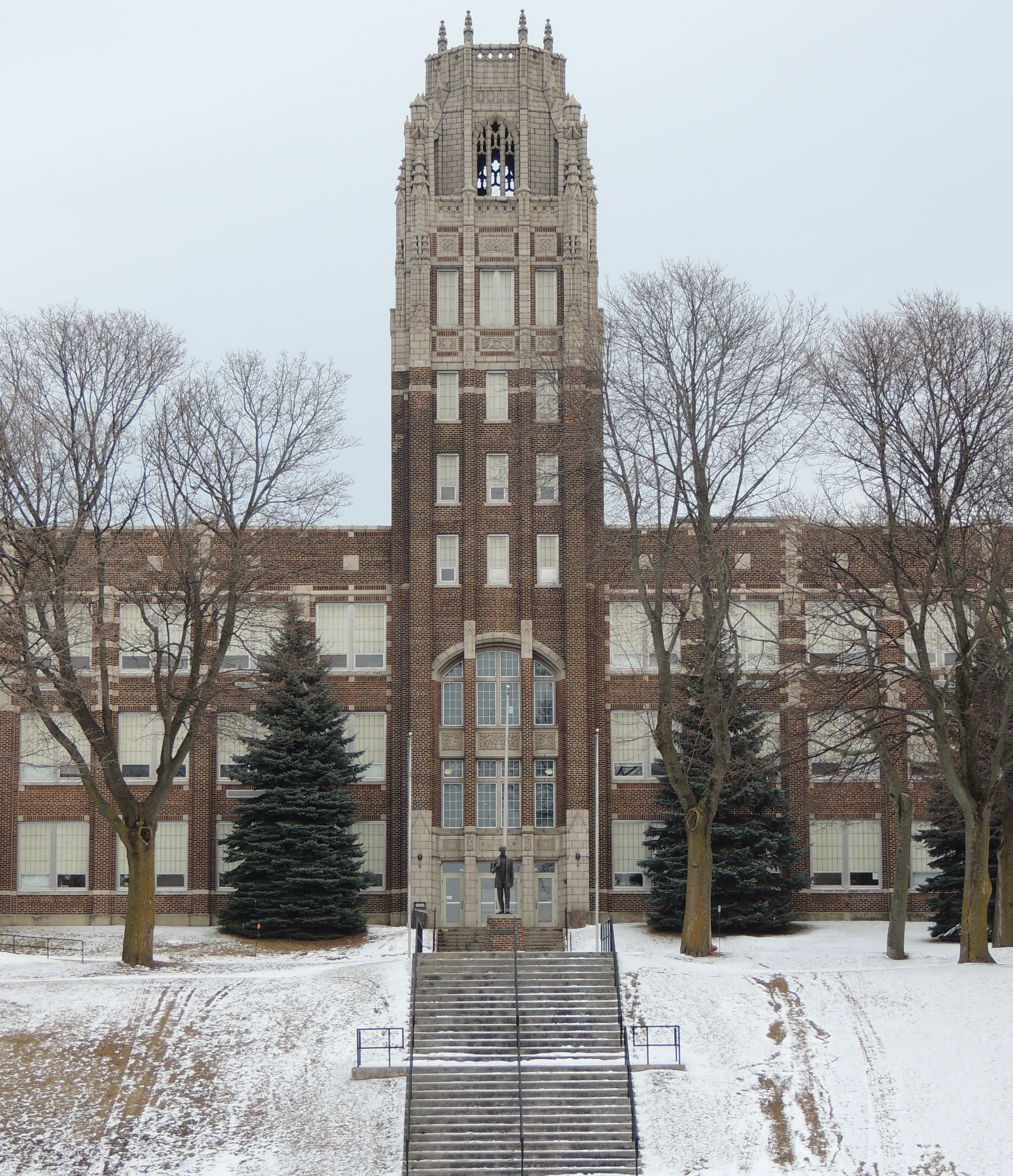

Location
- 1433 South 8th Street; Manitowoc, Wisconsin 54220; United States; 44.0800102°N 87.6594562°W

Information
- School type: Public high school
- Established: 1923; 103 years ago
- School district: Manitowoc Public School District
- Principal: Micah Hoffman
- Teaching staff: 93.93 (FTE)
- Grades: 9 through 12
- Enrollment: 1,385 (2024-2025)
- Student to teacher ratio: 15.49
- Color
- Athletics conference: Fox River Classic Conference (FRCC)
- Nickname: Ships, Shipbuilders
- Yearbook: Flambeau
- Website: lincoln.manitowocpublicschools.org

Lincoln High School is a public high school that serves the city and its immediate suburbs of Manitowoc, Wisconsin. USA. The school serves students in grades 9 through 12, with an enrollment of roughly 1,400. Constructed in 1923, Lincoln High School was designed by the Chicago-based firm of Perkins, Fellows, & Hamilton and its campus plan was designed by Jens Jensen. It is located on Roeff's Hill, along scenic Lake Michigan. The gothic-style building occupies 19 acres (7.7 ha) on the south side of the city. School colors are red and white. The school's official team name is the "Shipbuilders", however, "Ships" is most often used.

== History ==
The original building was finished in 1923, making Lincoln High School the oldest standing public high school in the state of Wisconsin. Since its completion, there have been eight renovations or additions to the school. The first was in 1930, with the addition of a pool. The west wing and third floor were added in 1942, followed by a first-floor library wing, a music wing, and a cafeteria wing in 1955. In 1956 the auditorium underwent its first major renovation. Built in 1961 was the John F. Kennedy Physical Education Center with a new girls' locker room. The original technology education wing was added in 1983. From 1996 to 2000, construction of a $16.5 million renovation and addition took place. These improvements included the addition of a new gymnasium and a new swimming pool to the J.F.K. Center, a new science lab wing, and an overhaul of the auditorium. This expansion added nearly 100,000 square feet (9,300 m^{2}) to the school. In 2010, the floors, walls and bleachers in the J.F.K. Fieldhouse were renovated.

== Athletics ==
Lincoln won the state championship in boys' cross country in 1929.

Lincoln won the state championship for basketball in 1963.

Lincoln achieved a 3-peat of state championships for football during the seasons of 1984, 1985, and 1986. During this time, the Ships had the longest active winning streak for a high school football program in the United States.

=== Athletic conference affiliation history ===
- Fox River Valley Conference (1923-2007)
- Fox River Classic Conference (2007–present)

== Notable alumni ==
- Art Albrecht, former Wisconsin Badgers and NFL player
- Mike Bare, Wisconsin state representative
- Dale Bolle, Wisconsin state representative
- Matthew Christman, co-host of the Chapo Trap House podcast
- Charles Daellenbach, founder and tuba with Canadian Brass
- Don Davey, NFL defensive tackle 1991–98
- John P. Foley, Wisconsin Court of Appeals judge
- Doug Free, player for NFL's Dallas Cowboys 2007–16
- Eugene S. Kaufman, Wisconsin state representative
- Les Kuplic, professional basketball player
- Henry C. Schadeberg, U.S. representative
- Lisa K. Stark, Wisconsin Court of Appeals judge, former deputy chief judge
- Paul Tittl, Wisconsin state representative
- Susan Bowers Vergeront, Wisconsin state representative
- R. T. Wallen, artist
- Jon Whitcomb, artist, illustrator
- Francis A. Yindra, Wisconsin state senator
