= Paul Tittl =

21st century American politician

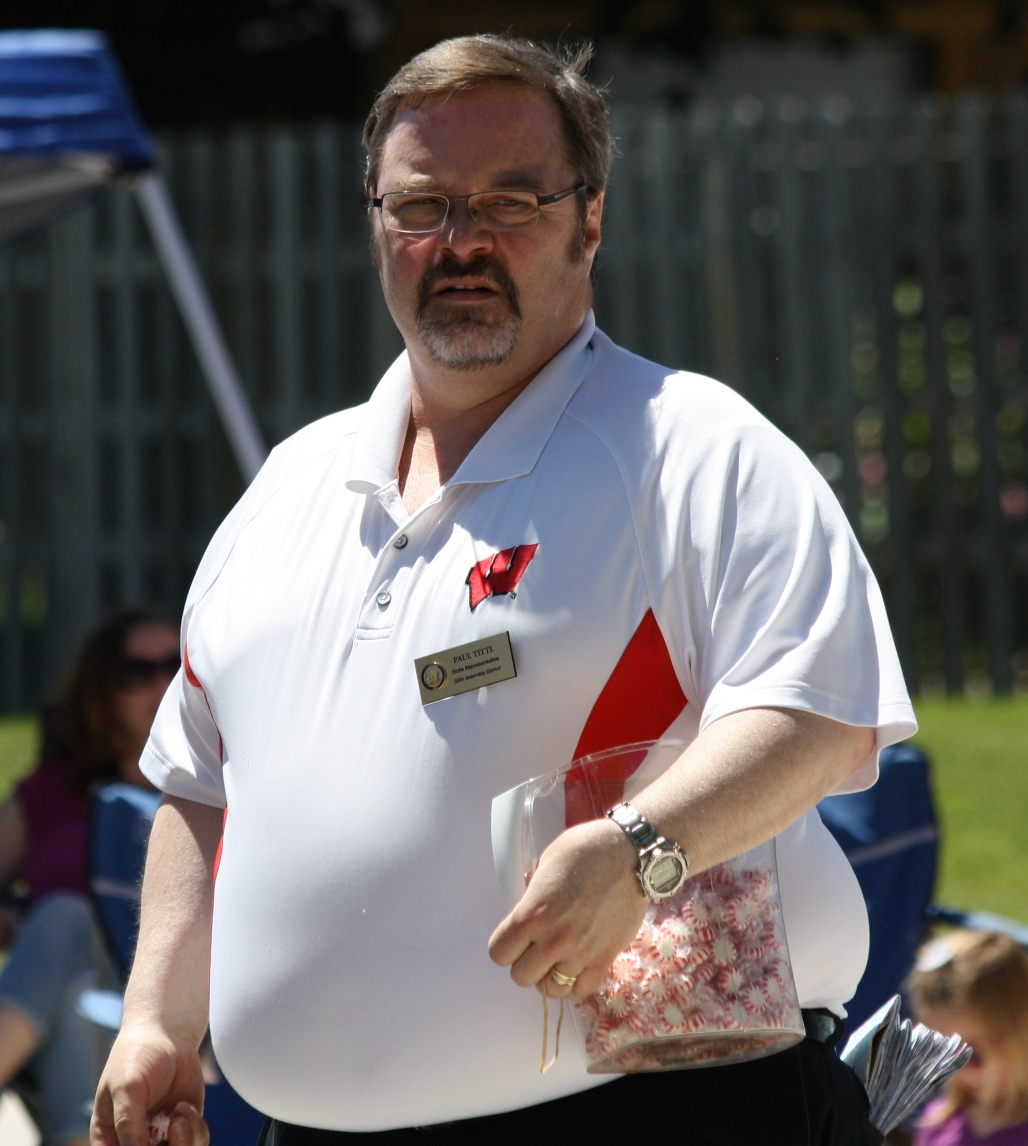
- Tittl walking in a 2013 parade

Member of the Wisconsin State Assembly from the 25th district
- Incumbent
- Assumed office January 7, 2013
- Preceded by: Bob Ziegelbauer

Chairman of the Board of Supervisors of Manitowoc County, Wisconsin
- In office April 20, 2010 – April 2012
- Preceded by: James N. Brey
- Succeeded by: Paul Biff Hansen

President of the Common Council of Manitowoc, Wisconsin
- In office April 17, 2006 – April 17, 2007
- Preceded by: Dean W. Graunke
- Succeeded by: Justin Nickels

Personal details
- Born: November 23, 1961 (age 64) Delavan, Wisconsin, U.S.
- Party: Republican
- Spouses: Lisa Mary Smith (m. 1986, divorced); Julie Lynn Ahrens (m. 1992)
- Children: 2
- Occupation: Politician, legislator, business owner
- Website: Official website

Paul Robert Tittl (born November 23, 1961) is an American businessman and Republican politician from Manitowoc, Wisconsin. He is a member of the Wisconsin State Assembly, representing Wisconsin's 25th Assembly district since 2013. He previously served on the Manitowoc city council and the Manitowoc County board of supervisors, serving as chairman of the board of supervisors from 2010 to 2012.

== Early life and career ==
Paul Tittl was born at a hospital in Elkhorn, Wisconsin. His parents at the time resided in Delavan, Wisconsin, but they returned to Manitowoc, Wisconsin, where they had been raised. Paul Tittl grew up in Manitowoc, and graduated from Manitowoc's Lincoln High School in 1980. After high school graduation, he went to work as a sales manager for a vacuum retailer. In 1987, he became the owner of the Vacuum & Sewing Center in Manitowoc. A decade later, he opened a paintball supply shop, called "Paintball Pauls", due to his own passion for paintball.

== Early political career ==
Tittl made his first run for public office in 2000, when he ran for an open seat on the Manitowoc County board of supervisors. He narrowly lost the election to James Barnes, who prevailed by 10 votes. Tittl requested a recount, but picked up only 1 additional vote, resulting in a final tally of 341 for Tittl and 350 for Barnes.

Four years later, he returned to electoral politics, running for an open seat on the Manitowoc city council. He won that election by a healthy margin, and began his service on the city council two weeks later. He was re-elected in 2006 and simultaneously elected to the county board, facing no opponent in either election. Shortly after the 2006 local elections, Tittl was elected president of the city council.

That summer, Tittl announced his first bid for election to the Wisconsin State Assembly, running as a Republican against Democratic incumbent Bob Ziegelbauer in the 25th Assembly district. Then as now, the 25th district comprised the city of Manitowoc and surrounding parts of Manitowoc County; in 2006, Ziegelbauer was running for his 8th term as representative. During the campaign, Tittl made an issue of the "Marriage Protection Amendment", a proposed amendment to the Constitution of Wisconsin to prevent the state from authorizing or recognizing same-sex marriages; but Ziegelbauert—a moderate Democrat—also supported the amendment. Ziegelbauer further bolstered his bipartisan credentials that fall by appearing in an advertisement for Republican congressional candidate John Gard, a longtime colleague of Ziegelbauer's in the Assembly and the incumbent speaker. In the waning days of the campaign, Tittl also sought to frame some incidents of Ziegelbauer's legislative career as supporting benefits for undocumented immigrants, but local papers found that the allegations contradicted the legislative record. Ziegelbauer won the election with 54% of the vote.

After his defeat, Tittl refocused his attention on local politics for the next several years. He lost his city council seat in a surprising upset in 2008, but was re-elected to the county board without opposition in 2008, 2010, and 2012. After the 2010 election, he was narrowly elected chairman of the county board, defeating incumbent chair James Brey by a single vote.

== State Assembly ==
In January 2012, Bob Ziegelbauer announced that he would not run for an 11th term in the Assembly. Tittl announced his candidacy to succeed Ziegelbauer in April 2012. He faced three opponents for the Republican nomination, businessman Mike Howe, Army veteran Barry Nelson, and plumber Jason Sladky. Tittl prevailed with 53% of the vote, and went on to the general election against the Democratic nominee, James Brey, Tittl's predecessor as county board chair. Tittl won the general election with 57% of the vote. He has won re-election six times in the district.

In the 2015 term, Tittl was appointed chair of the Assembly Committee on Mental Health Reform, he has been chair of that committee and its successor committees since that time, now serving as chair of the Assembly Committee on Mental Health and Substance Abuse Prevention.

== Personal life and family ==
Paul Tittl is the youngest of four children born to Frederick and Rita (née Daley) Tittl. Frederick Tittl was an Air Force veteran of the Korean War and managed a supermarket in Manitowoc for 27 years, then worked for The Manitowoc Company until his retirement.

Paul Tittl married Lisa Smith of Mishicot, Wisconsin, on September 6, 1986; they had one son together but divorced. Paul later married Julie Lynn Ahrens on April 25, 1992, and became stepfather to her daughter. Paul and Julie still reside in Manitowoc.

== Electoral history ==
=== Manitowoc county board (2000) ===
Year	Election	Date	Elected				Defeated				Total	Plurality
2000	General	Apr. 4	James K. Barnes	Nonpartisan	350	50.58%	Paul Tittl	Non.	341	49.28%	692	9

=== Manitowoc city council (2004, 2006, 2008) ===
Year	Election	Date	Elected				Defeated				Total	Plurality
2004	General	Apr. 6	Paul Tittl	Nonpartisan	339	56.97%	Tom Klein	Non.	256	43.03%	595	83
2006	General	Apr. 4	Paul Tittl (inc)	Nonpartisan	616	99.35%	--unopposed--				620	
2008	General	Apr. 1	David Soelder	Nonpartisan	470	62.50%	Paul Tittl (inc)	Non.	282	37.50%	752	188

=== Manitowoc county board (2006, 2008, 2010, 2012) ===
Year	Election	Date	Elected				Defeated	Total	Plurality
2006	General	Apr. 4	Paul Tittl	Nonpartisan	639	100.0%	--unopposed--	639	
2008	General	Apr. 1	Paul Tittl (inc)	Nonpartisan	554	100.0%	--unopposed--	554	
2010	General	Apr. 6	Paul Tittl (inc)	Nonpartisan	634	100.0%	--unopposed--	634	
2012	General	Apr. 3	Paul Tittl (inc)	Nonpartisan		100.0%	--unopposed--		

=== Wisconsin Assembly (2006) ===
Year	Election	Date	Elected				Defeated				Total	Plurality
2006	General	Nov. 7	Bob Ziegelbauer (inc)	Democratic	11,163	54.00%	Paul Tittl	Rep.	8,557	41.39%	20,672	2,606

=== Wisconsin Assembly (2012–present) ===
Year	Election	Date	Elected				Defeated				Total	Plurality
2012	Primary	Aug. 14	Paul Tittl	Republican	3,589	53.21%	Mike Howe	Rep.	1,362	31.96%	6,745	2,227
2012	Primary	Aug. 14	Paul Tittl	Republican	3,589	53.21%	Barry Nelson	Rep.	1,066	15.80%	6,745	2,227
2012	Primary	Aug. 14	Paul Tittl	Republican	3,589	53.21%	Jason J. Sladky	Rep.	723	10.72%	6,745	2,227
2012	General	Nov. 6	Paul Tittl	Republican	16,287	57.56%	Jim Brey	Dem.	11,947	42.22%	28,295	4,340
2014	General	Nov. 4	Paul Tittl (inc)	Republican	17,042	100.0%	--Unopposed--				17,042	N/A
2016	General	Nov. 8	Paul Tittl (inc)	Republican	17,325	64.97%	Ronald J. Kossik	Dem.	9,305	34.89%	26,667	8,020
2018	General	Nov. 6	Paul Tittl (inc)	Republican	14,785	62.02%	Jennifer Estrada	Dem.	9,042	37.93%	23,838	5,743
2020	General	Nov. 3	Paul Tittl (inc)	Republican	19,593	64.63%	Kerry Trask	Dem.	10,703	35.31%	30,314	8,890
2022	General	Nov. 8	Paul Tittl (inc)	Republican	19,344	97.11%	--Unopposed--				19,919	18,769
2024	Primary	Aug. 13	Paul Tittl (inc)	Republican	4,203	59.65%	David Wage	Rep.	2,833	40.21%	7,046	1,370
2024	General	Nov. 5	Paul Tittl (inc)	Republican	19,587	61.72%	Stephen R. Welch	Dem.	12,123	38.20%	31,736	7,464

Wisconsin State Assembly
Preceded by Bob Ziegelbauer	Member of the Wisconsin State Assembly from the 25th district January 7, 2013 – present	Incumbent
