= André Jacque =

American politician (born 1980)

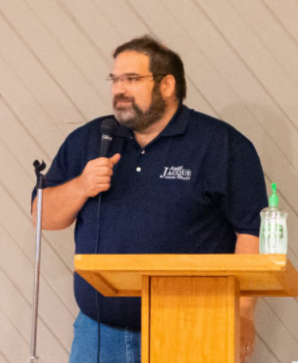

Member of the Wisconsin Senate from the 1st district
- Incumbent
- Assumed office January 7, 2019
- Preceded by: Caleb Frostman

Member of the Wisconsin State Assembly from the 2nd district
- In office January 3, 2011 – January 7, 2019
- Preceded by: Ted Zigmunt
- Succeeded by: Shae Sortwell

Personal details
- Born: October 13, 1980 (age 45) Beaver Dam, Wisconsin, U.S.
- Party: Republican
- Spouse: Renée Jacque
- Children: 6
- Education: University of Wisconsin, Madison (BS)
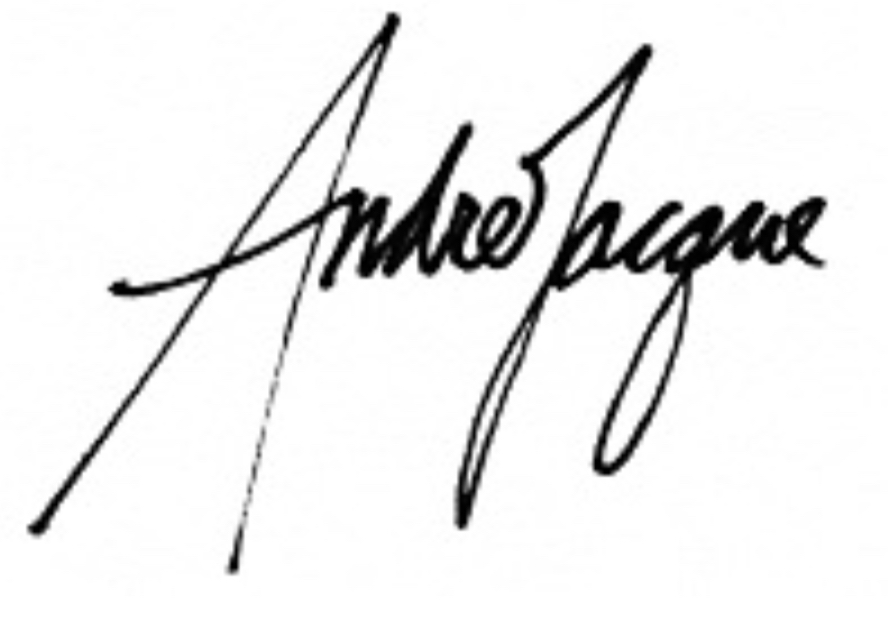
- Signature
- Website: State Senate Page

André M. Jacque (born October 13, 1980) is an American consultant and Republican politician from De Pere, Wisconsin. He is a member of the Wisconsin Senate, representing Wisconsin's 1st Senate district since 2019. He previously served four terms in the Wisconsin State Assembly (2011–2019). He was a candidate in the 2024 Republican primary for United States House of Representatives in Wisconsin's 8th congressional district.

== Early life and career ==
Jacque was born in Beaver Dam, Wisconsin on October 13, 1980, and graduated from Green Bay Southwest High School. He earned his bachelor's degree from the University of Wisconsin–Madison in 2003 and received a graduate certificate from the Madison's Robert M. La Follette School of Public Affairs. He worked as a transit planning coordinator, communications director and a grant-writing consultant before beginning his political career.

Jacque is the board chair of both Great Lakes/St. Lawrence River Legislative Caucus Executive Board and Nutrient Management Taskforce and the Small Business Regulatory Review and the state lead for the National Caucus of Environmental Legislators. He serves as a board member for the Wisconsin Council on Domestic Abuse, Wisconsin Housing and Economic Development Authority, Council on Workforce Investment, Family and Childcare Resources of Northeast Wisconsin Board, Green Bay Area Crime Stoppers, Van Handel Memorial Foundation Board for Families of Children with Special Needs, Brown County Tax Payer Association, and the Knights of Columbus.

Jacque was a former board member of the Wisconsin Small Business Environmental Council, Child Abuse and Neglect Prevention Board, Council on Tourism, Golden House Domestic Violence Shelter Community Leadership Council, Wisconsin Association of Municipal and County Assistant Managers, National Association of Local Government Environmental Professionals Grants Management Taskforce, and the Wisconsin Higher Educational Aids Board in 2001, and served from 2001 to 2003.

== Political career ==
In 2010 Jacque was elected to the Wisconsin State Assembly to represent Wisconsin's 2nd Assembly District. He was reelected to the Assembly in 2012 and ran unopposed for reelection in 2014. In 2016 he also faced no major party opposition. Jacque is a member of the Brown County Taxpayers Alliance, Pro-Life Wisconsin, Wisconsin Right to Life and the National Rifle Association of America. On May 15, 2018, he won the Republican primary election for the vacant seat for the 1st Senate District but was narrowly defeated in the June special election by Democrat Caleb Frostman. He later defeated Frostman in November 2018, winning a full four-year term in the Wisconsin State Senate. Jacque was awarded the Green Bay Area Chamber of Commerce's "Future 15" award in 2011 and again in 2018. He was awarded the 2019–'20 Legislator of the Year award by the Wisconsin VFW for his close work with them.

== Political positions ==
=== COVID-19 pandemic ===
In 2021, in the midst of the COVID-19 pandemic, Jacque was outspoken against vaccine mandates and authored legislation that would bar government officials or business owners from requiring Wisconsinites to be vaccinated against COVID-19 or show proof of vaccination to access services. Jacque also opposed the statewide mask mandate implemented by Gov. Tony Evers and joined legislation to end it. He tested positive for COVID-19 and was hospitalized with pneumonia in August.

On August 17, 2021, it was reported that he was "tired but in good spirits." On August 20, 2021, State Rep. Shae Sortwell stated in a Facebook post that Sen. Andre Jacque: "is in serious need of your prayers. [...] He is in the hospital with Covid induced pneumonia." On August 25, 2021, Jacque was placed on a ventilator, but was listed in stable condition. In addition, Jacque's brother Pierre fired back at Sortwell, stating: "I am praying that you shut the hell up and f*** off." Sortwell, like Jacque, has opposed vaccine mandates and wearing face masks. Pierre Jacque went on to say in his post: "Go get the vaccine. Or at least be honest and let your flock know that the 'choice' they are making is between effective scientifically backed preventative medicine, or choking on a vent ..." On August 30, 2021, Jacque's wife pleaded: "that those individuals who are eligible and able to receive the COVID-19 vaccine please consider placing their trust in the medical professionals who recommend it."

On September 21, 2021, Jacque was transferred from the hospital to a care facility after being on a ventilator for almost a month. It is unclear what type of facility and whether Jacque was vaccinated. His office did not clarify when asked. He returned to work the second week of October 2021 and reported that he was still using a walker but feeling better every day. He started a meeting by thanking everyone who had supported him during his battle with the disease, including medical professionals helping him through his recovery. On November 8, 2021, Jacque returned to the Senate floor, calling himself "very blessed that God's not done with me yet."

Asked on whether his time in the hospital and months-long physical therapy had changed his views on how Wisconsin could handle public health issues, he said he would not comment on COVID-19 but that he did have some "insights" from his months-long stay in hospitals and rehabilitation centers.

== Electoral history ==
=== Wisconsin Assembly (2010–2016) ===
Year	Election	Date	Elected				Defeated				Total	Plurality
2010	Primary	Sep. 14	André Jacque	Republican	3,204	48.62%	Jeff Van Straten	Rep.	2,239	33.98%	6,590	965
2010	Primary	Sep. 14	André Jacque	Republican	3,204	48.62%	Terry Ostrander	Rep.	1,135	17.22%	6,590	965
2010	General	Nov. 2	André Jacque	Republican	13,958	62.23%	Ted Zigmunt (inc)	Dem.	8,456	37.70%	22,429	5,502
2012	General	Nov. 6	André Jacque (inc)	Republican	17,082	58.62%	Larry Pruess	Dem.	12,033	41.29%	29,141	5,049
2014	General	Nov. 4	André Jacque (inc)	Republican	18,994	98.64%	--unopposed--				19,256	18,732
2016	General	Nov. 8	André Jacque (inc)	Republican	20,039	69.29%	Mark Grams	Ind.	8,837	30.56%	28,920	11,202

=== Wisconsin Senate (2018–2022) ===
Year	Election	Date	Elected				Defeated				Total	Plurality
2018 (special)	Primary	May. 15	André M. Jacque	Republican	4,369	51.95%	Alex Renard	Rep.	4,039	48.03%	8,410	330
2018 (special)	Special	Jun. 12	Caleb Frostman	Democratic	14,606	51.38%	André Jacque	Rep.	13,801	48.55%	28,427	805
2018	Primary	Aug. 14	André Jacque	Republican	11,823	76.25%	Bill Nauta	Rep.	3,677	23.71%	15,505	8,146
2018	General	Nov. 6	André Jacque	Republican	47,826	54.50%	Caleb Frostman (inc)	Dem.	39,414	45.43%	86,768	7,875
2022	General	Nov. 8	André Jacque (inc)	Republican	52,009	59.49%	Andrea Gage-Michaels	Dem.	35,363	40.45%	87,420	16,646

=== U.S. House (2024) ===
Year	Election	Date	Elected				Defeated				Total	Plurality
2024 (special)	Primary	Aug. 13	Tony Wied	Republican	42,610	42.48%	Roger Roth	Rep.	31,874	32.53%	97,993	10,736
2024 (special)	Primary	Aug. 13	Tony Wied	Republican	42,610	42.48%	André Jacque	Rep.	23,509	23.99%	97,993	10,736
2024	Primary	Aug. 13	Tony Wied (inc)	Republican	41,937	42.13%	Roger Roth	Rep.	34,344	34.51%	99,532	7,593
2024	Primary	Aug. 13	Tony Wied (inc)	Republican	41,937	42.13%	André Jacque	Rep.	23,186	23.30%	99,532	7,593
