= R. T. Wallen =

American artist

R. T. "Skip" Wallen (born in 1942) is an American artist based in the state of Alaska. He is best known for his stone lithographs of Alaskan wildlife and native peoples and for his monumental bronze sculptures. His original prints, watercolors, and small bronzes are found in museums and private collections around the world. His monumental bronze sculptures are found in major institutions and public spaces in the U.S. and Europe. He was one of only two living artists included in the landmark New York Kennedy Gallery exhibit, Alaskan Masters, in 1976. and has had one-man exhibitions of stone lithographs in Europe. He was recognized with an honorary doctorate in the arts in 2006.

== Early life and education ==
R. T. Wallen was born in Manitowoc, Wisconsin on January 3, 1942. While still a student at Lincoln High School (Manitowoc, Wisconsin), he spent his summers in Petersburg, Alaska commercial fishing with his uncle. As a zoology major at the University of Wisconsin, he worked on archaeological digs in the Anangula Archeological District, in the Aleutian Islands of Alaska, identifying bird and animal bones excavated in the 3,000-year-old site.

== Career ==
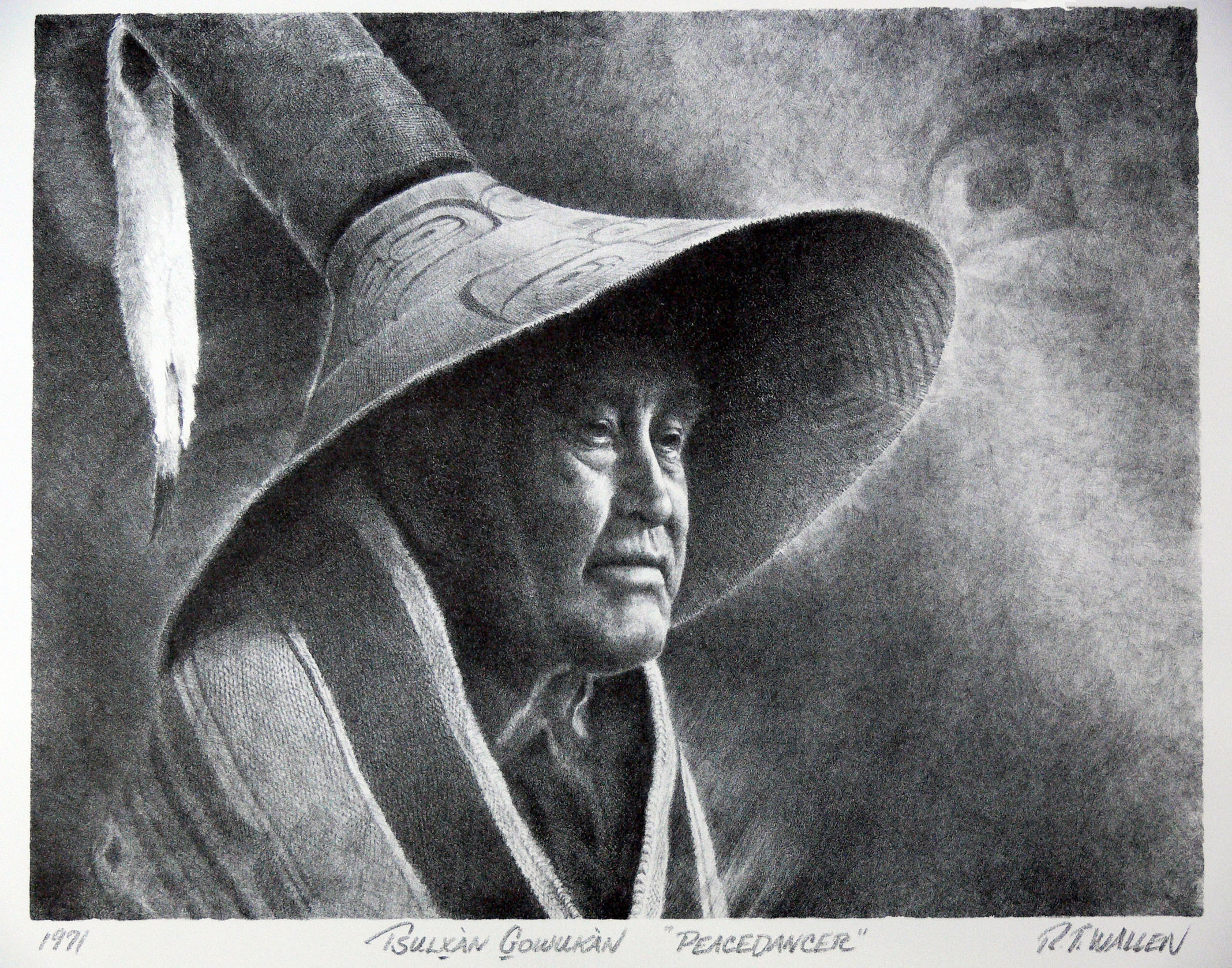
Peacedancer stone lithograph by R.T. Wallen

Wallen began his career as a field biologist for the Alaska Department of Fish and Game, where he participated in the re-introduction of sea otters to southeast Alaska and the introduction of muskox to Nunivak Island. He spent six months in 1965 as an observer on Little Diomede Island, living in a semi-subterranean house and hunting with the local men in a traditional skin boat known as an umiak. While in the field, he began sketching the fauna near his camp. His drawings were used in the original Alaska Wildlife Notebook series. He became a full-time staff artist at the headquarters in Juneau.

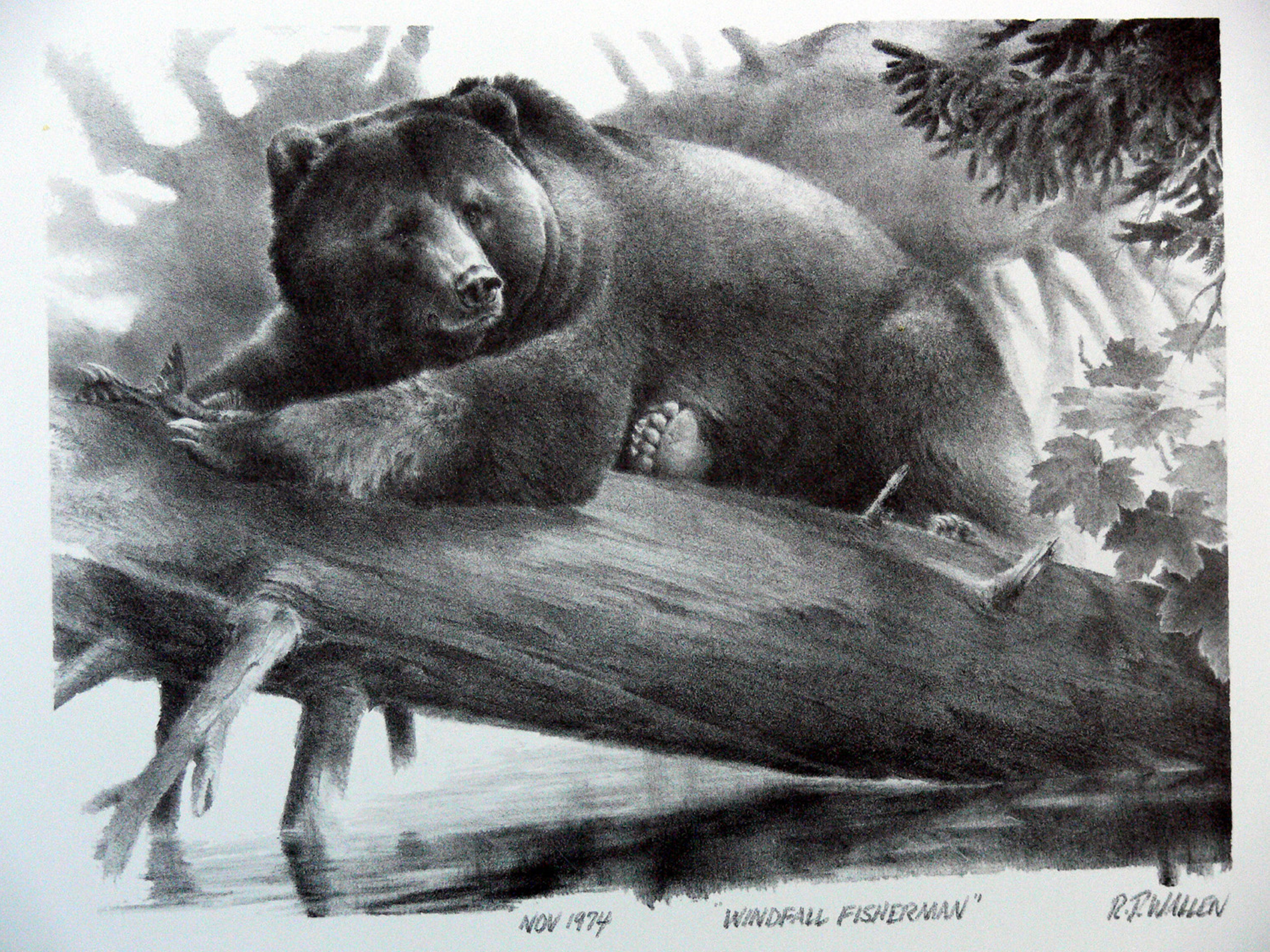
Windfall Fisherman stone lithograph by R.T. Wallen

Wallen left the Fish and Game department in 1967 to become a full-time independent artist. He set up a small art gallery in Juneau called the Kayak Gallery and later renamed the Wallen Gallery. From there he sold charcoal sketches, watercolors and hand-pulled lithographs from limestone that were printed by the notable New York printers George C. Miller & Sons in editions of between 25 and 185.

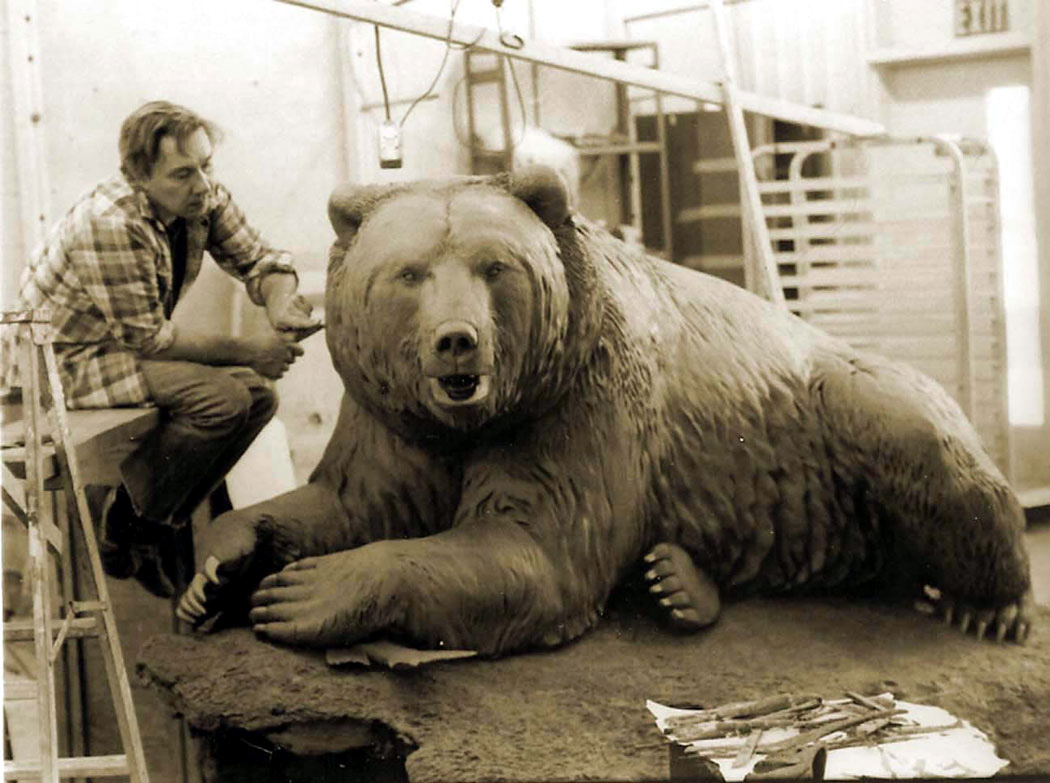
Windfall Fisherman by R.T. Wallen

He and a friend invented a new method of printing using eraser block and fabric for the color print entitled Arrival of the Seabirds, based on his experience of the spring hunt on Little Diomede Island. They called this printing technique Pointigraphy. While it achieved a completely new look, it was so laborious that they printed only one edition of 170 prints, entitled “Arrival of the Seabirds", based on Wallen's experiences during the spring hunt on Little Diomede Island. Other original color prints and stone lithographs also featured Alaska wildlife and Native peoples.

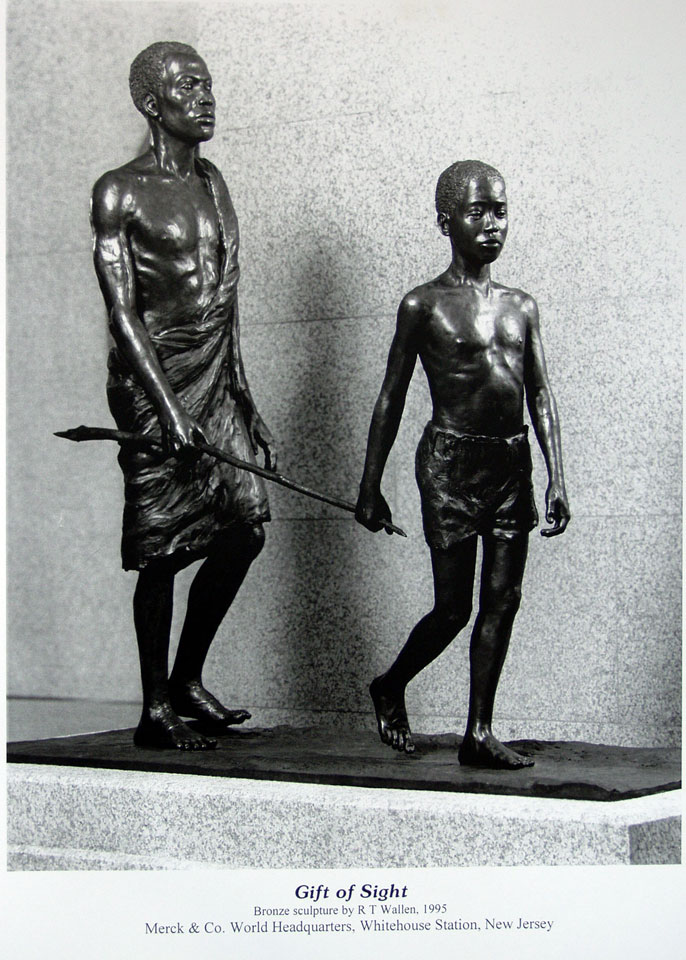
Gift of Sight bronze by R.T. Wallen

The Silver Anniversary Committee of Juneau initiated a public art project to commemorate the 25th anniversary of Alaska statehood in 1984. Wallen's Windfall Fisherman, a life-size Alaska brown bear in bronze, was selected and stands near the Alaska Capitol. It was based on a 1974 stone lithograph of the same title. Another Alaska brown bear sculpture was commissioned by the DIPAC/Macaulay Salmon Hatchery in Juneau of a mother bear and three cubs, entitled Gang of Four.

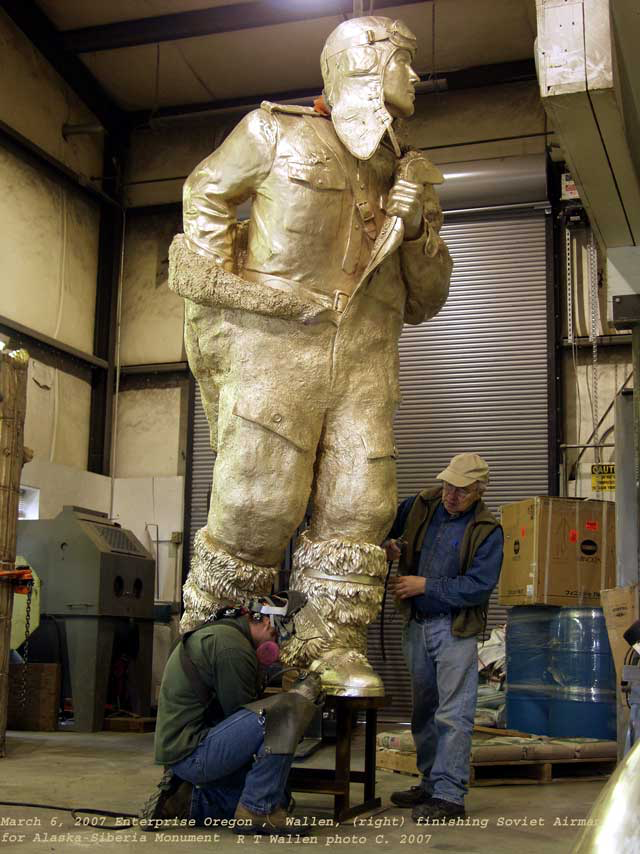
A figure from the Alaska-Siberia WWII memorial in Fairbanks, Alaska.

To celebrate the 50th anniversary of Alaska Statehood in 2009, a group of private citizens formed a nonprofit organization to commission Wallen to create a life-scale humpback whale sculpture with waterworks to simulate the cascade of water off a breaching whale. After creating a maquette, Wallen scaled up the whale to one-third life size (eight feet) and cast the intermediate bronze for the University of Alaska Southeast in Juneau in 2013.

In 2011, Wallen began work on maquettes for a monumental bronze sculpture for the Lake Michigan shoreline between his hometown of Manitowoc and Two Rivers, Wisconsin. Entitled Spirit of the Rivers, the work consists of a Native American man portaging a birch bark canoe accompanied by a woman and an elder. The full-size figures are approximately 10 feet high. The sculpture celebrates the birch bark canoe as the origin of the maritime tradition in this region.

== Philanthropic works ==
Wallen was a pioneer in the conservation movement in southeast Alaska in the 1960s. He worked to get protected status for places such as the Alaska Chilkat Bald Eagle Preserve, the Mendenhall Wetlands, Admiralty Island National Monument, Petersburg Creek-Duncan Salt Chuck Wilderness, and the extension of Denali National Park. He has donated his artwork to state and national conservation fundraising efforts as well as to public television. Alaska governor Steve Cowper appointed Wallen to the all-volunteer Alaska Board of Game in 1990.

Wallen donated his time to the River Blindness Foundation to create a small sculpture of a blind African man being led by a child, a common sight in many parts of Africa where River Blindness (Onchocerciasis) blinds many people. John Moores, founder of the River Blindness Foundation, paid for the casts, which were intended to be given as gifts to major donors to the foundation. The foundation eventually partnered with the Carter Center, which asked for another edition of small sculptures to give to donors who contributed $1 million or more to the effort to eradicate the disease. With the World Bank and other organisations, they led the programs to distribute the drug Ivermectin (Mectizan) which had been developed and donated by Merck and Co.

The Wallens initiated and raised funds for a project to carve a traditional spruce canoe in Glacier Bay National Park under the direction of George Dalton, Sr. in 1987. Two canoes were created. One is on display in Bartlett Cove in Glacier Bay and the other went with the clan to Hoonah.

== Personal life ==
In the mid-1960s, he was adopted into the Dak Dein Taan clan of the Tlingit people of southeast Alaska. In 1982 he married Dr. Lynn Price Ager, an anthropologist and author. Following their wedding in Sicily, she was adopted by his Tlingit family into the Kaagwaantaan clan. Together, they published a biography of their adopted parents, George and Jesse Dalton. They have one son.
