= Frank Lasee =

American politician (born 1961)

Frank G. Lasee

Member of the Wisconsin Senate from the 1st district
- In office January 3, 2011 – December 29, 2017
- Preceded by: Alan Lasee
- Succeeded by: Caleb Frostman

Member of the Wisconsin State Assembly from the 2nd district
- In office January 3, 1995 – January 5, 2009
- Preceded by: Dale Bolle
- Succeeded by: Ted Zigmunt

Personal details
- Born: December 11, 1961 (age 64) Oceanside, California, U.S.
- Party: Republican
- Spouses: Kirsten F. Schneider (div. 2001); Amy Joy Savaglio
- Children: 4
- Education: University of Wisconsin–Green Bay
- Occupation: Salesman, politician

Frank G. Lasee (born December 11, 1961) is an American businessman and Republican politician from Brown County, Wisconsin. He was a member of the Wisconsin Senate for seven years, representing Wisconsin's 1st Senate district from 2011 to 2018. He also served 14 years in the Wisconsin State Assembly, from 1995 to 2009, and ran unsuccessfully for United States House of Representatives in 2016.

After losing the 2016 election, he worked two years as administrator of the Division of Worker's Compensation in the Wisconsin Department of Workforce Development, in the last two years of the administration of Governor Scott Walker. He subsequently was hired as president of the Heartland Institute, but was fired a year later in the midst of financial difficulties at that organization.

== Early life and career ==
Born in Oceanside, California, to a Marine Corps officer stationed at Camp Pendleton on December 11, 1961, and subsequently raised in Green Bay and De Pere, Lasee graduated in 1986 from the University of Wisconsin–Green Bay with a major in history. He is married and the father of six daughters.

Prior to his election to the State Assembly in 1994, Lasee was the Ledgeview Town Board Chair from 1993 to 1997, and was a telemarketing supervisor for an insurance company.

== Political career ==
=== State Assembly ===
Lasee was a member of the State Assembly who dissented on many issues, including state budgets. He was called an advocate of taxpayers, limited spending and an opponent of tax increases. He was elected seven times.

Some of his most notable proposals included the Taxpayer Protection Act and a Taxpayers Bill of Rights.

A 2006 proposal was the "Taxpayer Protection Act". The TPA proposed to tie government revenue to inflation, population, personal income growth, etc.

Lasee lost his bid for an eighth term representing the 2nd Assembly District to Democrat Ted Zigmunt on November 4, 2008. Lasee blamed his defeat on the Wisconsin Education Association Council, the state's largest teachers' union, claiming they spent $250,000 on campaign ads.

=== State Senate ===
Frank's older cousin, Alan Lasee, announced his retirement from the Wisconsin Legislature on January 11, 2010. Frank Lasee competed with Democrat Monk Elmer for his cousin's old seat in the 2010 campaign, ultimately prevailing by twenty percentage points.

In June 2014, the Democratic Party of Wisconsin filed a complaint with the Government Accountability Board alleging that Lasee was living outside of his district. The Party contended that while Lasee listed a town of Ledgeview address on his candidacy papers, he was actually living with his wife and children in Racine, which is outside of the 1st Senate District. The Government Accountability Board ultimately ruled to allow Lasee to stay on the ballot and leave the issue up to the voters.

Frank Lasee was challenged by Democrat Dean DeBroux in the general election, and prevailed by over twenty percentage points.

In the Senate a notable bill proposed by Lasee included the Consumer's Choice in Auto Insurance Act, which lowered the cost of insurance by eliminating the stacking clause.

==== Committee assignments ====
===== Senate Standing Committees =====
- Committee on Financial Institutions and Rural Issues
- Committee on Insurance and Housing (chair)
- Committee on State and Federal Relations and Information Technology
- Committee on Transportation and Elections

===== Joint Committees =====
- Joint Survey Committee on Tax Exemptions (Co-chair)
- Joint Legislative Council
- Governor's Commission on Waste, Fraud and Abuse

== Congressional campaigns ==
=== 2012 U.S. Senate election ===
In September 2011, he announced he would run for the U.S. Senate seat vacated by retiring Democratic U.S. Senator Herb Kohl. On January 29, 2012, he announced his withdrawal from the U.S. Senate race.

=== 2016 U.S. House of Representatives election ===
On February 14, 2016, Lasee announced he would run for the U.S. House seat being vacated by retiring Rep. Reid Ribble. He lost to eventual general election winner Mike Gallagher in the primary.

== Post-legislative career ==
On December 29, 2017, Lasee resigned from the Senate to become administrator of the Wisconsin Department of Workforce Development's Worker's Compensation Division.

In 2019, Lasee became president of The Heartland Institute, an American conservative and libertarian public policy think tank. He was removed in March 2020, with the organization facing financial issues.

== Personal life and family ==
Frank Lasee is a first cousin of Alan Lasee, who served 34 years in the Wisconsin Senate, also representing Wisconsin's 1st Senate district.

Frank Lasee's first wife was Kirsten F. Schneider. They had three daughters together before divorcing in 2001. He subsequently married Amy Joy Larsen (née Savaglio), of Racine, and became stepfather to her three daughters as well. Frank Lasee is also the father of another daughter with a former girlfriend, Kari Manteufel. This child was the subject of a decade-long child support and paternity battle beginning in 2005.

== Electoral history ==
=== Wisconsin Senate (2010, 2014) ===
Wisconsin State Senate 1st District election, 2010
Party	Candidate	Votes	%
Republican	Frank Lasee	43,415	60.04
Democratic	Monk Elmer	28,800	39.83
Republican hold			

Wisconsin State Senate 1st District election, 2014
Party	Candidate	Votes	%
Republican	Frank Lasee	47,438	61.59
Democratic	Dean DeBroux	29,555	38.37
Republican hold			

=== Wisconsin Assembly (2002–2008) ===
Wisconsin State Assembly 2nd District election, 2002
Party	Candidate	Votes	%
Republican	Frank Lasee (incumbent)	10,920	62.53
Democratic	Dan Katers	6,524	37.36
Republican hold			

Wisconsin State Assembly 2nd District election, 2004
Party	Candidate	Votes	%
Republican	Frank Lasee (incumbent)	21,848	99.36
Independent	Write-in	141	0.64
Republican hold			

Wisconsin State Assembly 2nd District election, 2006
Party	Candidate	Votes	%
Republican	Frank Lasee (incumbent)	15,347	89.30
Independent	Write-in	1,839	10.70
Republican hold			

Wisconsin State Assembly 2nd District election, 2008
Party	Candidate	Votes	%
Democratic	Ted Zigmunt	16,008	52.12
Republican	Frank Lasee (incumbent)	14,687	47.82
Democratic gain from Republican			

=== U.S. House (2016) ===
Year	Election	Date	Elected				Defeated				Total	Plurality
2016	Primary	Sep. 9	Mike Gallagher	Republican	40,322	74.46%	Frank Lasee	Rep.	10,705	19.77%	54,152	29,617
2016	Primary	Sep. 9	Mike Gallagher	Republican	40,322	74.46%	Terry McNulty	Rep.	3,109	5.74%	54,152	29,617

Wisconsin State Assembly
Preceded by Dale Bolle	Member of the Wisconsin State Assembly from the 2nd district 1995–2009	Succeeded by Ted Zigmunt
Wisconsin Senate
Preceded by Alan Lasee	Member of the Wisconsin State Senate from the 1st district 2011–2017	Succeeded by Caleb Frostman
