= David Hopkins =

David Hopkins may refer to:

- Dai Hopkins (footballer, born 1902) (1902-1943), Welsh footballer (Arthur David Hopkins)
- David Hopkins (writer) (born 1977), American comic book writer and essayist
- David Hopkins (musician) (born 1971), American singer-songwriter
- David W. Hopkins (1897–1968), U.S. Representative from Missouri
- David Hopkins (cricketer) (born 1957), former English cricketer
- David R. Hopkins (1938–2017), American engineer, businessman, and politician
- David C. Hopkins, researcher of ancient history and near eastern archaeology

== See also ==
- David Hopkin (born 1970), Scottish footballer
