= Robyn Vining =

21st century American politician

Member-elect of the Wisconsin Senate from the 5th district
- Assuming office January 2027
- Succeeding: Rob Hutton

Member of the Wisconsin State Assembly
- Incumbent
- Assumed office January 6, 2025
- Preceded by: Tom Michalski
- Constituency: 13th district
- In office January 7, 2019 – January 6, 2025
- Preceded by: Dale Kooyenga
- Succeeded by: Angelito Tenorio
- Constituency: 14th district

Personal details
- Born: Robin D. Beckley; November 11, 1976 (age 49) Wright-Patterson Air Force Base, Ohio, U.S.
- Party: Democratic
- Spouse: Jim W. Vining
- Children: 2
- Education: James Madison University (BA, BS); Trinity Evangelical Divinity School (MA)
- Occupation: photographer, pastor, politician
- Website: Official website Campaign website

Robyn Beckley Vining (born November 11, 1976) is an American photographer, nonprofit executive, and Democratic politician from Wauwatosa, Wisconsin. She is a member of the Wisconsin State Assembly and member-elect of the Wisconsin Senate; she will represent Wisconsin's 5th Senate district in the 108th Wisconsin Legislature (2027–2028). In the Assembly, she has represented Wisconsin's 13th Assembly district since 2025, and previously represented the 14th Assembly district from 2019 to 2025.

== Early life and career ==
Robyn Vining was born Robyn Beckley at Wright-Patterson Air Force Base in Ohio. Born into a military family, she moved several times in childhood, attending school in Austin, Texas, before ultimately graduating from James Madison High School in Vienna, Virginia, in 1996. She received her bachelor's degree in psychology and studio art from James Madison University, and earned a master's degree in theology and culture from Trinity Evangelical Divinity School in 2002.

Vining was a pastor for a time. She moved to the Milwaukee area in 2008 and started her own small business as a photographer. In 2012, she co-founded the non-profit organization Exploit No More, focused on ending child sex trafficking. She is also co-founder of the non-profits Help Portrait Milwaukee and The Milwaukee Portrait Project.

In 2017, she was named American Mothers' Wisconsin Mother of the Year.

== Political career ==
In 2018, when incumbent state representative Dale Kooyenga announced that he would seek election to the Senate rather than re-election to the Assembly, Vining decided to run for the open seat. She entered the Democratic primary campaign, but her would-be opponent, Chris Rockwood, after meeting with her, decided to withdraw from the race and endorse her candidacy instead.

Her opponent in the general election was then-incumbent Wisconsin State Treasurer Matt Adamczyk, who had decided to seek election to the Assembly rather than run for re-election as State Treasurer. The election was close, and an error on election night initially showed Adamczyk the winner by 35 votes. However, the error was discovered and the final certified result showed Vining winning the election by 138 votes. In 2020, she was once again endorsed by the Working Families Party of Wisconsin. She won re-election by a slightly more comfortable margin in 2020, defeating political newcomer Bonnie Lee with 53% of the vote.

When originally drawn as part of the 2011 legislative gerrymandering, Vining's 14th Assembly district seat was considered safely Republican; this was because of the significant suburban population, which had constituted a Republican base vote since the Reagan era. But since the election of Donald Trump in 2016, suburban voters had begun shifting toward Democrats, leading to Vining's victories in the 14th district, and the 2020 election of Sara Rodriguez in the neighboring 13th district—also heavily suburban. In 2022, the conservative majority of the Wisconsin Supreme Court enacted a new redistricting plan devised by Republican Party operatives; Vining's district was packed with more Democratic voters from the neighboring 13th and 15th Assembly districts, in order to make those other two districts safely Republican again. Vining easily won her re-election in 2022, receiving 63% of the vote.

The 2023 Wisconsin Supreme Court election, however, flipped the majority on the Wisconsin Supreme Court; the court then re-examined the redistricting issue later that year and ordered new maps to be produced. In 2024, a Democratic map proposal was enacted, again significantly reshaping Vining's district and the surrounding area. Vining's district, the 14th, shifted south and became anchored at West Allis. Vining was moved into the new 13th district, along with Republican incumbent Tom Michalski of Elm Grove, who had won the seat after the 2022 redistricting. The new 13th district contained both Michalski's Elm Grove and most of Vining's home city Wauwatosa, as well as a significant portion of neighboring Brookfield. Both Vining and Michalski ran in the 2024 election in one of several incumbent-vs-incumbent matchups. Vining prevailed in the general election with 57% of the vote.

In July 2025, Vining announced that she would run for Wisconsin Senate in the 5th Senate district, challenging first term incumbent Republican senator Rob Hutton. The 5th Senate district—comprising Milwaukee suburbs straddling the boundary between Milwaukee and Waukesha counties—has become increasingly competitive, due to the same demographic forces at play in Vining's Assembly seat. The 2024 redistricting, which had reshaped Vining's Assembly district, also shifted the 5th Senate district, making it more favorable for Democrats. The district now comprises most of Vining's home city, Wauwatosa, along with part of the city of Milwaukee and most of neighboring West Allis—in Milwaukee County—along with Elm Grove, Brookfield (city and town), and Pewaukee (city and village) in Waukesha County. The 5th district was a top target for the Democratic Party in their effort to regain the Senate majority in 2026. Vining ultimately won the election, receiving 57% of the vote, and Democrats regained the Senate majority going into the 108th Wisconsin Legislature.

== Personal life and family ==
Robyn Beckley took the last name Vining when she married Jim Vining. They have two children and reside in Wauwatosa, Wisconsin.

== Electoral history ==
=== Wisconsin Assembly, 14th district (2018–2022) ===
Year	Election	Date	Elected				Defeated				Total	Plurality
2018	General	Nov. 6	Robyn Vining	Democratic	16,597	48.58%	Matt Adamczyk	Rep.	16,459	48.18%	34,162	138
2018	General	Nov. 6	Robyn Vining	Democratic	16,597	48.58%	Rick Braun	Lib.	691	2.02%	34,162	138
2018	General	Nov. 6	Robyn Vining	Democratic	16,597	48.58%	Steven Shevey	Ind.	402	1.18%	34,162	138
2020	General	Nov. 3	Robyn Vining (inc)	Democratic	21,370	53.99%	Bonnie Lee	Rep.	18,186	45.95%	39,579	3,184
2022	General	Nov. 8	Robyn Vining (inc)	Democratic	17,703	63.35%	Keva Turner	Rep.	10,219	36.57%	27,946	7,484

=== Wisconsin Assembly, 13th district (2024) ===
Year	Election	Date	Elected				Defeated				Total	Plurality
2024	General	Nov. 5	Robyn Vining	Democratic	22,540	57.23%	Tom Michalski (inc)	Rep.	16,796	42.65%	39,384	5,744

=== Wisconsin Senate (2026) ===
Year	Election	Date	Elected				Defeated				Total	Plurality
2026	General	Nov. 3	Robyn Vining	Democratic	50,107	57.00%	Mike Roberts	Rep.	37,794	43.00%	87,901	12,313

Wisconsin State Assembly
Preceded by Dale Kooyenga	Member of the Wisconsin State Assembly from the 14th district January 7, 2019 – January 6, 2025	Succeeded by Angelito Tenorio
Preceded by Tom Michalski	Member of the Wisconsin State Assembly from the 13th district January 6, 2025 – present	Incumbent
