= Leah Vukmir =

Wisconsin politician

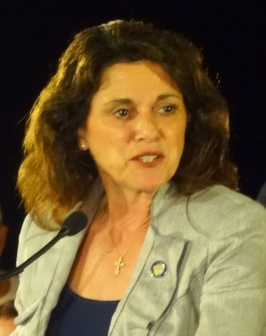
- Vukmir in 2015

Member of the Wisconsin Senate from the 5th district
- In office January 3, 2011 – January 7, 2019
- Preceded by: Jim Sullivan
- Succeeded by: Dale Kooyenga

Member of the Wisconsin State Assembly from the 14th district
- In office November 5, 2002 – January 3, 2011
- Preceded by: Scott Walker
- Succeeded by: Dale Kooyenga

Personal details
- Born: Leah Papachristou; April 26, 1958 (age 68) Milwaukee, Wisconsin, U.S.
- Party: Republican
- Spouse: George Vukmir
- Children: 2
- Education: Marquette University (BSN); University of Wisconsin–Madison (MSN)
- Website: Official website

Leah Vukmir (née Papachristou; born April 26, 1958) is an American politician and nurse who served as a member of the Wisconsin Senate. A Republican, she represented Wisconsin's 5th Senate district. She previously served in the Wisconsin State Assembly. Vukmir was the Republican nominee in the 2018 U.S. Senate election in Wisconsin, running unsuccessfully against incumbent Democrat Tammy Baldwin. In March 2019, Vukmir became vice president of state affairs at the National Taxpayers Union.

== Early life and education ==
Vukmir was born Leah Papachristou in Milwaukee on April 26, 1958, the daughter of immigrants from Greece. She graduated from Brookfield East High School in Brookfield, Wisconsin in 1976. Vukmir received a Bachelor of Science in Nursing from Marquette University in 1980, and a Master of Science in Nursing from the University of Wisconsin–Madison in 1983. She worked as a registered nurse and a pediatric nurse practitioner.

== Career ==
=== Wisconsin legislature ===
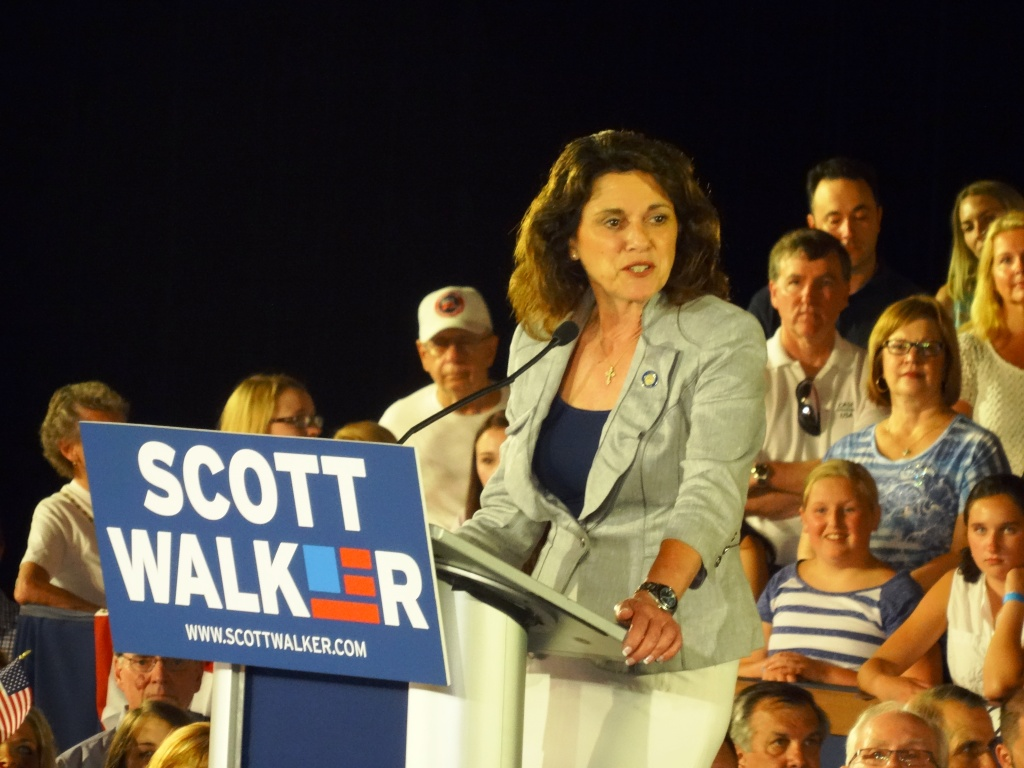
Vukmir speaking in 2015 at the announcement of Scott Walker's presidential campaign

Vukmir was first elected in November 2002, succeeding Scott Walker (R), who was elected in a special election as Milwaukee County Executive. She was the ranking member of the Assembly's Committee on Health and Health Care Reform. She was also a member of the committees on Public Health, Education Reform, Education and Criminal Justice.

Vukmir announced on June 25, 2009, that she was challenging incumbent Democratic State Senator Jim Sullivan for the 5th district seat in 2010. The race attracted large amounts of out-of-state campaign contributions, with 7% of Sullivan's donors and 14% of Vukmir's donors being residents of Wauwatosa. On November 2, 2010, Vukmir defeated Sullivan for reelection. She was succeeded in her Assembly seat by fellow Republican Dale Kooyenga.

Vukmir opposes medical marijuana and has said that there is no medical reason to use it. At a public hearing in 2009, she was booed after accusing fellow legislators Jon Erpenbach and Mark Pocan of using dying cancer patients to further a secret agenda of legalization.

During Republican-led redistricting efforts after 2010, email communications showed that Vukmir called for redistricting changes that aided her politically (gerrymandering), such as making her district more Republican. At one point, she wrote, "This is such a big task. So glad we are in control!"

Vukmir is on the board of directors of the American Legislative Exchange Council (ALEC), a nonprofit organization of conservative state legislators and private sector representatives who draft and share model state-level legislation for distribution among state governments in the United States. In June 2013, the Center for Media and Democracy sued Vukmir, contending she had violated Wisconsin's open records law by not turning over records related to her involvement with ALEC. Vukmir responded by claiming she could not be sued while in office. The lawsuit was settled in 2014, with the state of Wisconsin agreeing to pay $15,000 and Vukmir turning over e-mails from her personal Yahoo! account that she said she had withheld due to technical issues.

In December 2017, the Wisconsin Department of Justice released a report criticizing a secret state investigation into Wisconsin Governor Scott Walker. During the course of the investigation, the state had seized the personal emails of 35 Republican lawmakers, including Vukmir. Included among the emails was correspondence between Vukmir and her daughter that included private medical information. Some of the emails were placed into a folder on state computers marked "opposition research." Vukmir wrote an op-ed in the Wall Street Journal criticizing the investigation, which she said was politically motivated and "un-American."

=== 2018 U.S. Senate election ===
On September 7, 2017, Vukmir announced that she would seek the 2018 Republican nomination for U.S. Senate.

During the primary campaign, Vukmir ran ads in which she attempted to link Baldwin with Khalid Sheikh Mohammed, mastermind of the September 11 attacks, calling them "Team Terrorists". PolitiFact rated the claims as "Pants on Fire" wrong.

On May 12, 2018, Vukmir secured the endorsement of the Wisconsin Republican Party at the state convention with 73 percent of the vote, besting former Marine Kevin Nicholson. Former White House Chief of Staff Reince Priebus praised what he termed Vukmir's proven track record of advancing a conservative agenda.

Vukmir won the Republican primary election on August 14, 2018 and was afterwards endorsed by President Donald Trump. She lost to incumbent Democrat Tammy Baldwin in the general election by eleven percentage points on November 6, 2018.

== Electoral history ==
Wisconsin 5th Senate District election 2010
| Party | Candidate | Votes | % | ±% |
|---|---|---|---|---|
| Republican | Leah Vukmir | 36,852 | 52.15 | |
| Democratic | Jim Sullivan (incumbent) | 33,702 | 47.69 | |

Wisconsin 5th Senate District election 2014
| Party | Candidate | Votes | % | ±% |
|---|---|---|---|---|
| Republican | Leah Vukmir | 55,869 | 73.6 | +21.45 |
| Libertarian | Wendy Friedrich | 20,020 | 26.4 | |

Republican U.S. Senate Primary Election, 2018
| Party | Candidate | Votes | % |
|---|---|---|---|
| Republican | Leah Vukmir | 217,023 | 48.9% |
| Republican | Kevin Nicholson | 190,840 | 43.0% |
| Republican | George Lucia | 18,803 | 4.2% |
| Republican | Griffin Jones | 8,764 | 2.0% |
| Republican | Charles Barman | 7,937 | 1.8% |
| Total votes | | 443,367 | 100% |

2018 United States Senate election, Wisconsin
| Party | Candidate | Votes | % | ±% |
|---|---|---|---|---|
| Democratic | Tammy Baldwin | 1,471,240 | 55.43% | |
| Republican | Leah Vukmir | 1,182,929 | 44.57% | |
| Majority | | | | |
| Turnout | | | | |

== Personal life ==
Vukmir attends Annunciation Greek Orthodox Church in Wauwatosa. She was at one time an active speedskater: a member of the West Allis Speedskating Club and an Amateur Speedskating Union referee.

Wisconsin State Assembly
| Preceded by Scott Walker | Member of the Wisconsin State Assembly from the 14th district 2002–2011 | Succeeded by Dale Kooyenga |
Wisconsin Senate
| Preceded by Jim Sullivan | Member of the Wisconsin State Senate from the 5th district 2011–2019 | Succeeded by Dale Kooyenga |
Party political offices
| Preceded by Tommy Thompson | Republican nominee for U.S. Senator from Wisconsin (Class 1); 2018 | Succeeded by Eric Hovde |
