= Thomas Seery =

American politician

Member of the Wisconsin State Assembly
- In office January 7, 1985 – January 4, 1993
- Preceded by: Dismas Becker
- Succeeded by: David Cullen
- Constituency: 13th district
- In office January 3, 1983 – January 3, 1983
- Preceded by: Joseph Czarnezki
- Succeeded by: Dismas Becker
- Constituency: 7th district

Personal details
- Born: February 19, 1945 (age 81) Milwaukee, Wisconsin, U.S.
- Party: Democratic

Thomas Seery (born February 19, 1945) is a lawyer and former member of the Wisconsin State Assembly.

== Background ==
Seery was born on February 19, 1945, in Milwaukee, Wisconsin. He graduated from Archbishop Quigley Preparatory Seminary, and in 1971 earned a Bachelor of Divinity degree from St. Francis Seminary. He worked as field director for the Citizens Utility Board of Wisconsin and as a Senior Citizen Advocate for the Family Service Association.

== Career ==
Seery was first elected to the Assembly in 1982 from the 7th Assembly district, which included the northwest corner of Milwaukee, which is also the northwest corner of Milwaukee County. He won a plurality in a four-way Democratic primary (the incumbent, fellow Democrat Michael G. Kirby, was [unsuccessfully] seeking nomination to the State Senate), and won the general election with 9,518 votes to 3,860 for Republican William R. Kerner.
