= Wisconsin's 13th Assembly district =

American legislative district in Waukesha County and Milwaukee County, Wisconsin

Wisconsin's 13th State Assembly district
- 2024 map defined in 2023 Wisc. Act 94; 2022 map defined in Johnson v. Wisconsin Elections Commission; 2011 map was defined in 2011 Wisc. Act 43
Assemblymember
Robyn Vining; D–Wauwatosa
since January 6, 2025 (1 years)
- Demographics: 84.88% White; 4.83% Black; 3.31% Hispanic; 15.49% Asian; 1.07% Native American; 0.11% Hawaiian/Pacific Islander
- Population (2020) • Voting age: 59,887; 46,383
- Website: Official website
- Notes: Milwaukee metro area

The 13th Assembly district of Wisconsin is one of 99 districts in the Wisconsin State Assembly. Located in southeast Wisconsin, the district comprises parts of western Milwaukee County and eastern Waukesha County. It contains most of the city of Wauwatosa, along with the village of Elm Grove and much of northern Brookfield. The district also contains landmarks such as the Medical College of Wisconsin, Froedtert Hospital, Mayfair Mall, and Webster Park. The district is represented by Democrat Robyn Vining, since January 2025; Vining previously represented the 14th district from 2019 to 2025.

The 13th Assembly district is located within Wisconsin's 5th Senate district, along with the 14th and 15th Assembly districts.

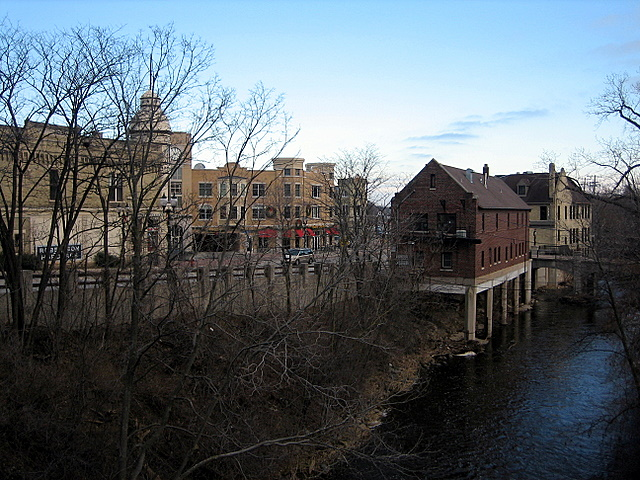
Wauwatosa, Wisconsin

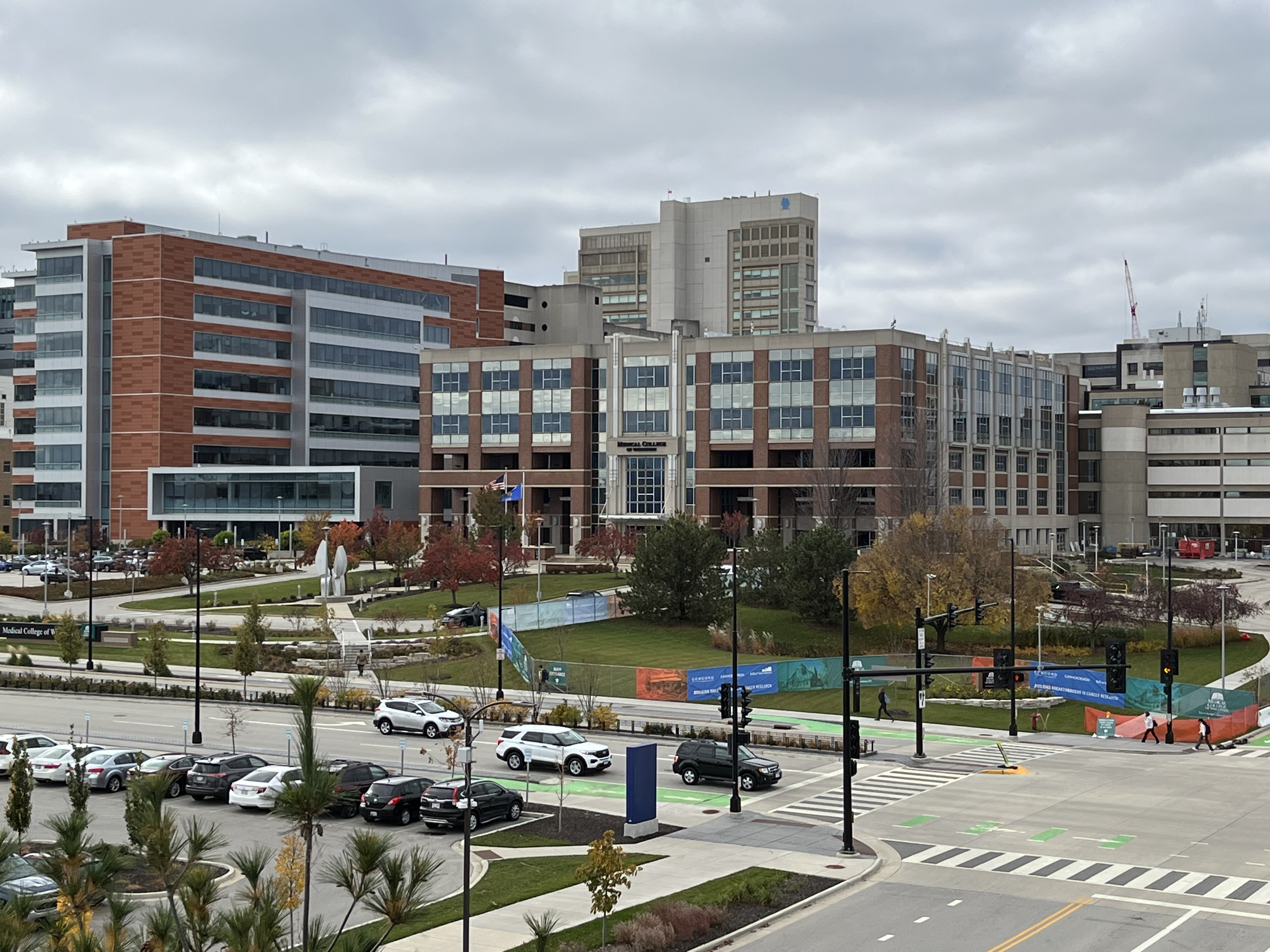
Medical College of Wisconsin

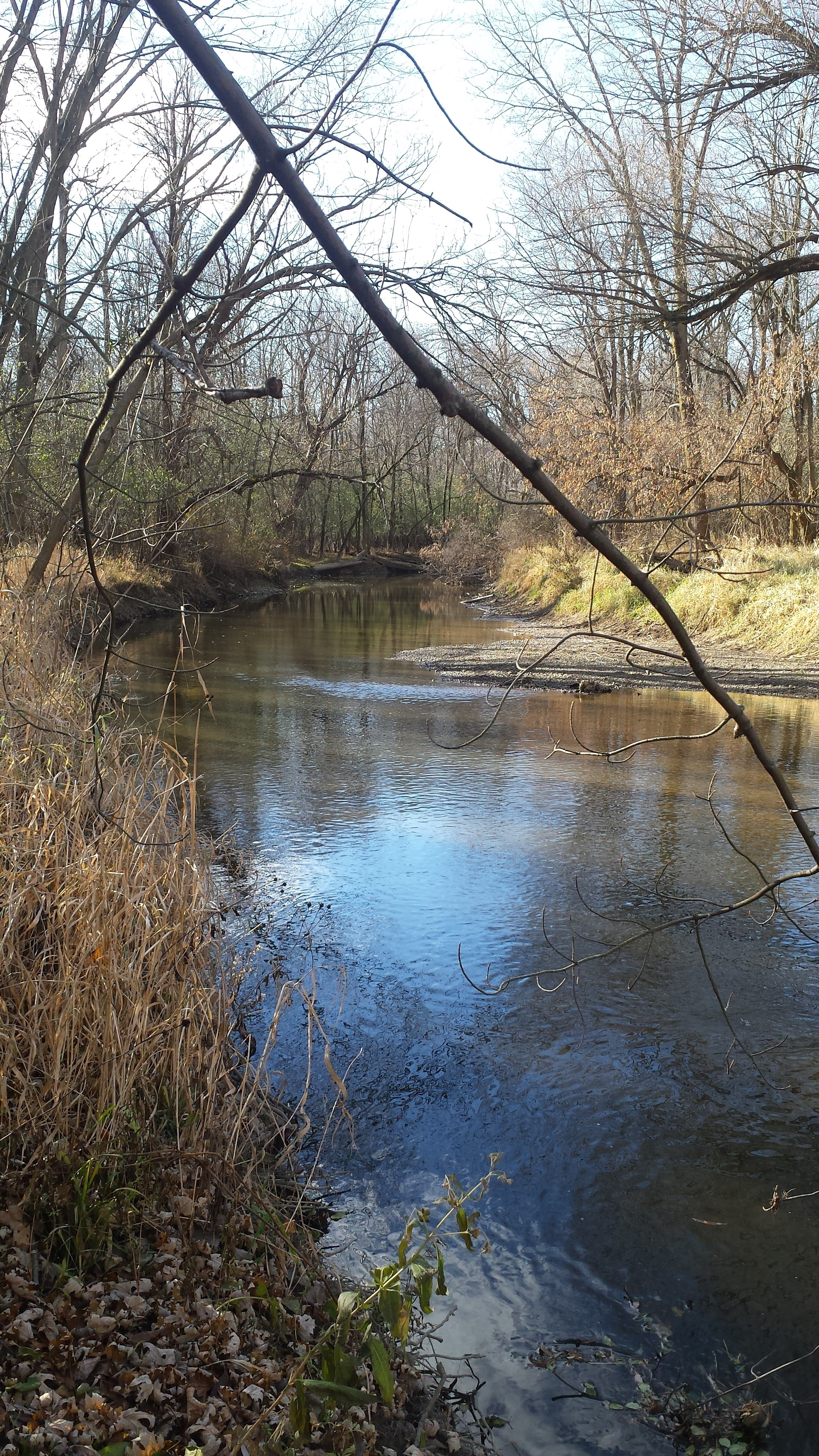
Menomonee River at Webster Park

== History ==
The district was created in the 1972 redistricting act (1971 Wisc. Act 304) which first established the numbered district system, replacing the previous system which allocated districts to specific counties. The 13th district was drawn somewhat in line with the western half of the previous Milwaukee County 18th district, though with some city of Milwaukee wards removed, and the village of Butler in Waukesha County added.

The district has remained in the same vicinity since 1972, but the boundaries have moved further and further west. By 2011, the district contained only a small portion of the city of Milwaukee; the 2022 redistricting saw the district move even further west, putting it almost entirely within Waukesha County. The 2024 redistricting act moved the district back to the east, re-adding most of the city of Wauwatosa and shedding a large part of the city of Brookfield.

== List of past representatives ==
List of representatives to the Wisconsin State Assembly from the 13th district
Member	Party	Residence	Counties represented	Term start	Term end	Ref.
District created
David Berger	Dem.	Milwaukee	Milwaukee, Waukesha	January 1, 1973	January 6, 1975	
Michael G. Kirby	Dem.	Milwaukee	Milwaukee, Waukesha	January 6, 1975	January 3, 1983	
Dismas Becker	Dem.	Milwaukee	Milwaukee	January 3, 1983	January 7, 1985	
Thomas Seery	Dem.	Milwaukee	Milwaukee	January 7, 1985	January 4, 1993	
David Cullen	Dem.	Milwaukee	Milwaukee	January 4, 1993	January 7, 2013	
Rob Hutton	Rep.	Brookfield	Milwaukee, Waukesha	January 7, 2013	January 4, 2021	
Sara Rodriguez	Dem.	Brookfield	Milwaukee, Waukesha	January 4, 2021	January 2, 2023	
Tom Michalski	Rep.	Elm Grove	Milwaukee, Waukesha	January 3, 2023	January 6, 2025	
Robyn Vining	Dem.	Wauwatosa	Milwaukee, Waukesha	January 6, 2025	Current	
Amy Zimmerman	Dem.	Brookfield	Milwaukee, Waukesha	Taking office January 2027		

== Electoral history ==
Year	Date	Elected				Defeated				Total	Plurality	Other primary candidates
1992	Nov. 3	David Cullen	Democratic	15,401	62.98%	James J. Ryan	Rep.	9,054	37.02%	24,455	6,347	
1994	Nov. 8	David Cullen (inc)	Democratic	10,079	56.27%	Doug Weare	Rep.	7,833	43.73%	17,912	2,246	
1996	Nov. 5	David Cullen (inc)	Democratic	12,232	57.45%	Dave Schultz	Rep.	9,058	42.55%	21,290	3,174	Doug Weare (Rep.)
1998	Nov. 3	David Cullen (inc)	Democratic	11,864	71.41%	Liliana Amparo	Rep.	4,344	26.15%	16,615	7,520	
1998	Nov. 3	David Cullen (inc)	Democratic	11,864	71.41%	John Washburn	Lib.	230	1.38%	16,615	7,520	
1998	Nov. 3	David Cullen (inc)	Democratic	11,864	71.41%	Wendell J. Harris Sr.	Ind.	177	1.07%	16,615	7,520	
2000	Nov. 7	David Cullen (inc)	Democratic	18,080	98.85%	--unopposed--				18,290	17,870	
2002	Nov. 5	David Cullen (inc)	Democratic	10,418	51.19%	Steve Adamczyk	Rep.	9,901	48.65%	20,353	517	
2004	Nov. 2	David Cullen (inc)	Democratic	17,765	56.84%	Matt Adamczyk	Rep.	13,428	42.96%	31,256	4,337	
2006	Nov. 7	David Cullen (inc)	Democratic	15,216	64.34%	Rick Baas	Rep.	8,402	35.53%	23,648	6,814	
2008	Nov. 4	David Cullen (inc)	Democratic	21,963	98.42%	--unopposed--				22,316	21,610	
2010	Nov. 2	David Cullen (inc)	Democratic	14,364	76.25%	Lisa R. Becker	Rep.	4,409	23.41%	18,837	9,955	
2012	Nov. 6	Rob Hutton	Republican	20,367	60.49%	John Pokrandt	Dem.	13,258	39.38%	33,669	7,109	Thomas J. Schellinger (Rep.); Nate Ristow (Rep.)
2014	Nov. 4	Rob Hutton (inc)	Republican	20,710	96.85%	--unopposed--				21,384	20,036	
2016	Nov. 8	Rob Hutton (inc)	Republican	23,904	96.99%	--unopposed--				24,645	23,163	
2018	Nov. 6	Rob Hutton (inc)	Republican	16,617	51.41%	Dennis Raymond McBride	Dem.	15,662	48.45%	32,323	955	
2020	Nov. 3	Sara Rodriguez	Democratic	19,318	50.93%	Rob Hutton (inc)	Rep.	18,583	49.00%	37,928	735	
2022	Nov. 8	Tom Michalski	Republican	18,712	56.26%	Sarah Harrison	Dem.	14,523	43.66%	33,261	4,189	Erik Ngutse (Rep.)
2024	Nov. 5	Robyn Vining	Democratic	22,540	57.23%	Tom Michalski (inc)	Rep.	16,796	42.65%	39,384	5,744	Patti Granger (Rep.)
