= Steven C. Brist =

American politician

Member of the Wisconsin State Assembly
- In office January 7, 1985 – January 5, 1987
- Preceded by: Peggy Rosenzweig
- Succeeded by: Leo Richard Hamilton
- Constituency: 67th district
- In office January 3, 1983 – January 7, 1985
- Preceded by: Michael G. Ellis
- Succeeded by: Esther K. Walling
- Constituency: 55th district
- In office January 3, 1977 – January 1, 1979
- Preceded by: Terry A. Willkom
- Succeeded by: David R. Hopkins
- Constituency: 67th district

Personal details
- Born: January 16, 1954 (age 72) Eau Claire, Wisconsin, U.S.
- Party: Democratic
- Spouse: Monica Anne Burkert (m. 1979)
- Children: Ben Brist
- Education: University of Wisconsin–Madison (B.A.); University of Wisconsin Law School (J.D.)
- Profession: attorney

Steven Carl Brist (born January 16, 1954) is an American attorney and former Democratic politician from Wisconsin. He served three terms in the Wisconsin State Assembly, representing the Chippewa Falls area during the 1977–1978, 1983–1984, and 1985–1986 terms. He served briefly as the executive director of the influential Tavern League of Wisconsin, then served for more than a decade as an assistant city attorney for Madison, Wisconsin.

His son, Ben Brist, was elected to the Wisconsin State Assembly in 2026.

== Early life and career ==
Born in Eau Claire, Wisconsin, he moved with his family to Chippewa Falls as a child and graduated from Chippewa Falls High School. He became involved with politics from an early age, and was a member and chairman of the Chippewa County Young Democrats. He attended Georgetown University, worked as an intern on the staff of U.S. representative Dave Obey. He did not graduate from Georgetown, and instead transferred to the University of Wisconsin–Madison. While in Madison, he worked as a legislative page and was subsequently hired as a legislative assistant, working more than three years in the Assembly before graduating with his bachelor's degree in 1976.

Also that year, at age 22, he made his first attempt at elected office, running for a seat on the Chippewa County Board of Supervisors and defeating former Chippewa Falls mayor Robert Halbleib. While running for office, he also volunteered for the brief 1976 Democratic primary campaign of U.S. Senator Mo Udall, who was challenging frontrunner Jimmy Carter in the Wisconsin presidential primary.

== Wisconsin Assembly ==
Later that year, with the announcement that Assembly Majority Leader Terry A. Willkom would not seek reelection, Brist jumped into the Democratic primary to succeed him in the 67th Assembly district. He faced a crowded primary field, with four other candidates running, including Willkom's brother, Lawrence Willkom. Nevertheless, Brist received the endorsement and support of several local labor unions and prevailed in the primary with 29% of the vote. He won a substantial victory in the general election, taking 70% of the vote against Republican Ralph Hauert.

In his first term in the Assembly, he was elected Democratic caucus secretary—an unusual honor for a freshman representative. He proposed a number of changes to the Constitution of Wisconsin to update or remove obsolete language, such as a voting-age requirement which had been superseded by the Twenty-sixth Amendment to the United States Constitution.

He faced a difficult reelection in 1978, and was one of seven incumbent Assembly Democrats defeated that year. Shortly after leaving office he began studying at the University of Wisconsin Law School, where he earned his J.D. in 1982.

He ran for office again that year in a rematch with his 1978 opponent, David R. Hopkins, in the newly redrawn 55th Assembly district. This time, Brist prevailed with 52% of the vote and returned to office for the 1983–1984 session. Another redistricting occurred in that legislative session, and Brist won his third term in 1984 back in the 67th Assembly district. He did not run for a fourth term in 1986.

In his second stint in the Assembly, he was again elected Majority caucus secretary, served as chairman of the Administrative Rules Committee, and was co-chair of the Survey Committee on Tax Exemptions. He served on the Judiciary Committee in all three of his terms, and served on the Agriculture Committee and Educational Communications Board in the 1983–1984 and 1985–1986 sessions.

== Later career ==
After leaving office, Brist worked for a while with Impact 7, a northwestern Wisconsin community development agency. But, in 1988 he relocated permanently to Madison, Wisconsin, and was hired as executive director of the Tavern League of Wisconsin, which lobbies on behalf of the interests of state alcoholic beverage retailers. In 1989, he was embroiled in scandal involving the Tavern League president, Gilbert Meisgeir, in which the organization had laundered campaign contributions to state legislators. Brist cooperated with the investigation and was never implicated in the criminal activity, which appeared to have ended before his hiring. That same year, he was also one of several current and former lawmakers who was reported to have received laundered campaign contributions from lobbyist Gary Goyke, though there was never an accusation that he was aware of the illegal nature of the donations.

In 1993, with incumbent Wisconsin State Treasurer Cathy Zeuske seeming likely to run for United States Senate instead of running for another term as Treasurer, Brist prepared a campaign to replace her. After a vigorous primary campaign, he lost to former Milwaukee state representative Dismas Becker, who went on to lose the general election to Republican Jack Voight.

Since the 1990s, he has been employed as an assistant city attorney in Madison, specializing in lobbying, elections, and ethics laws.

== Personal life and family ==
Steven Brist's father, George Brist, was a member of the Chippewa Falls city council.

Brist married Monica Ann Burkert, the daughter of a Chippewa Falls Episcopal priest, on June 16, 1979. Congressman Dave Obey stood for him as best man at the wedding.

Their son, Ben Brist, was elected to the Wisconsin State Assembly in 2026.

Wisconsin State Assembly
| Preceded by Terry A. Willkom | Member of the Wisconsin State Assembly from the 67th district January 3, 1977 – January 1, 1979 | Succeeded by David R. Hopkins |
| Preceded by Michael G. Ellis | Member of the Wisconsin State Assembly from the 55th district January 3, 1983 – January 7, 1985 | Succeeded by Esther K. Walling |
| Preceded by Peggy Rosenzweig | Member of the Wisconsin State Assembly from the 67th district January 7, 1985 – January 5, 1987 | Succeeded by Leo Richard Hamilton |
