= Peggy Rosenzweig =

American politician

Member of the Wisconsin Senate from the 5th district
- In office April 20, 1993 – January 6, 2003
- Preceded by: Tom Barrett
- Succeeded by: Tom Reynolds

Member of the Wisconsin State Assembly
- In office January 4, 1993 – April 20, 1993
- Preceded by: David Cullen
- Succeeded by: Scott Walker
- Constituency: 14th district
- In office January 7, 1985 – January 4, 1993
- Preceded by: Chuck Chvala
- Succeeded by: Marc C. Duff
- Constituency: 98th district
- In office January 3, 1983 – January 7, 1985
- Preceded by: David R. Hopkins
- Succeeded by: Steven C. Brist
- Constituency: 67th district

Personal details
- Born: November 5, 1936 (age 89) Detroit, Michigan, U.S.
- Party: Republican
- Education: University of Wisconsin–Milwaukee

Peggy A. Rosenzweig (born November 5, 1936) is a former member of the Wisconsin State Senate and the Wisconsin State Assembly. She served in the Wisconsin Legislature from 1983 to 2003.

== Political career ==
Before being elected to the Assembly, she worked as director of community relations for the Milwaukee Regional Medical Center and a consultant for the Independence Bank of Wauwatosa.

Rosenzweig began her career in the Wisconsin Legislature as another later ended it, challenging a long-time incumbent Republican for the nomination. She defeated George Klicka in the September 1982 primaries 3,487 to 2,752, before defeating Democrat James Bottoni in the general election, 12,773 to 7,536.

In April 1993, Rosenzweig won a special election against Democrat David Cullen for an open seat in the Wisconsin State Senate. She was unseated in the 2002 primaries by fellow Republican Thomas G. Reynolds, who claimed she was too liberal on issues such as abortion and gun-control. The election may have been influenced by the redrawing of the 5th Senate District after the 2000 census, which increased its proportion of Republicans.

In 2003, Rosenzweig was appointed to the Board of Regents of the University of Wisconsin System by governor Jim Doyle, serving until 2008.

In 2006, Rosenzweig was appointed to the board of the Wisconsin Technical College System.

== Personal life and education ==
Born in Detroit, Michigan, Rosenzweig graduated from the University of Wisconsin–Milwaukee in 1978 with a degree in political science. She also attended Juilliard for two semesters in the early 1950s. Rosenzweig is married to David Y. Rosenzweig, a doctor and professor at the Medical College of Wisconsin. As of 2011, she had five adult children, twelve grandchildren, and one great grandchild. She lives in Wauwatosa, Wisconsin.

Rosenzweig is Jewish, having been raised in the Reform tradition.

== Electoral history ==
2002 State Senate GOP Primary

- Tom Reynolds-55%
- Peggy Rosenzweig (inc)-45%

== Notes ==
Wisconsin State Assembly
Preceded by David R. Hopkins	Member of the Wisconsin State Assembly from the 67th district January 3, 1983–January 7, 1985	Succeeded by Steven C. Brist
Preceded by Charles Chvala	Member of the Wisconsin State Assembly from the 98th district January 7, 1985–January 4, 1993	Succeeded by Marc C. Duff
Preceded by David Cullen	Member of the Wisconsin State Assembly from the 14th district January 4, 1993–April 20, 1993	Succeeded by Scott Walker
Wisconsin Senate
Preceded by Tom Barrett	Member of the Wisconsin State Senate from the 5th district April 20, 1993–January 5, 2003	Succeeded by Thomas G. Reynolds
