= Derrick Z. Jackson =

American journalist

Derrick Zane Jackson (born July 31, 1955, in Milwaukee, Wisconsin) is a nature photographer and journalist for The Boston Globe.

Jackson's views are considered liberal, and he often addresses politics, racial as well as environmental issues in his twice-weekly column. Jackson is known for his annual columns discussing graduation rates of college football and basketball teams. During each year's March Madness, he devotes several columns to discussing the graduation rates of the participating teams.

A native Milwaukeean and graduate of John Marshall High School, Jackson has a bachelor's degree in journalism from the University of Wisconsin–Milwaukee. He attended Harvard University on a Nieman Fellowship in 1984, and is the recipient of various honorary degrees.

Jackson has also been and integral part of Audubon's Seabird Institute (previously known as Project Puffin). He has worked as an instructor teaching photography at Hog Island Audubon Camp's Arts & Birding week, and has done work documenting the Seabird Institute's work with birds such as Roseate Terns and Atlantic Puffins.

== Publications ==
In 2015, Jackson co-authored the book Project Puffin: The Improbable Quest to Bring a Beloved Seabird Back to Egg Rock with Dr. Stephen W. Kress. In 2020, they published a followup, The Puffin Plan – Restoring Seabirds to Egg Rock and Beyond. The books tell the story of Project Puffin, a conservation initiative from the National Audubon Society.
