= Tom Michalski =

21st century American politician

Member of the Wisconsin State Assembly from the 13th district
- In office January 3, 2023 – January 6, 2025
- Preceded by: Sara Rodriguez
- Succeeded by: Robyn Vining

Member of the Board of Supervisors of Waukesha County, Wisconsin, from the 8th district
- In office April 2016 – January 2023
- Preceded by: Eric Highum
- Succeeded by: Johnny Koremenos

Personal details
- Born: June 27, 1951 (age 75) Greenfield, Wisconsin, U.S.
- Party: Republican
- Spouse: Jennifer Morris
- Children: 1
- Education: University of Wisconsin–Milwaukee (B.B.A.)
- Website: Official website Campaign website

Military service
- Allegiance: United States of America
- Branch/service: United States Air Force
- Years of service: 1970–1976

Thomas Michalski (born June 27, 1951) is an American information technology professional and Republican politician from Waukesha County, Wisconsin. He served one term as a member of the Wisconsin State Assembly, representing Wisconsin's 13th Assembly district in the 2023–2024 term. He also previously served as a member of the Waukesha County board of supervisors.

== Biography ==
Tom Michalski was born and raised in Greenfield, Wisconsin. He earned his bachelor's degree in business administration from the University of Wisconsin–Milwaukee. He went to work providing information technology services to Marquette University in Milwaukee, and worked in that role for 30 years.

== Political career ==
He moved to Elm Grove, Wisconsin, in Waukesha County, in the late 1990s, where he joined the volunteer fire department. In 2011, he was elected to the board of trustees of Elm Grove, where he continues to serve to the present. In 2016, he was also elected to the Waukesha County board of supervisors, and was re-elected in 2018, 2020, and 2022. He was also appointed to the board of the Waukesha County Technical College.

In 2021, Wisconsin State Assembly incumbent Sara Rodriguez announced that she would run for Lieutenant Governor of Wisconsin rather than seeking another term in the Assembly. Michalski announced his candidacy for the Republican nomination in the 13th Assembly district. He narrowly prevailed over his primary opponent, Erik Ngutse, and went on to win the November general election with 56% of the vote.

In 2024, Michalski attempted to seek re-election to the 13th district, but was defeated by fellow legislator Robyn Vining, who had been drawn into the district due to redistricting.

== Electoral history ==
=== Wisconsin Assembly (2022, 2024) ===
Year	Election	Date	Elected				Defeated				Total	Plurality
2022	Primary	Aug. 9	Tom Michalski	Republican	4,958	50.58%	Erik Ngutse	Rep.	4,822	49.19%	9,803	136
2022	General	Nov. 8	Tom Michalski	Republican	18,712	56.26%	Sarah Harrison	Dem.	14,523	43.66%	33,261	4,189
2024	Primary	Aug. 13	Tom Michalski (inc)	Republican	5,218	79.45%	Patti Granger	Rep.	1,338	20.37%	6,568	3,880
2024	General	Nov. 5	Robyn Vining	Democratic	22,540	57.23%	Tom Michalski (inc)	Rep.	16,796	42.65%	39,384	5,744

Wisconsin State Assembly
Preceded by Sara Rodriguez	Member of the Wisconsin State Assembly from the 13th district January 3, 2023 – January 6, 2025	Succeeded by Robyn Vining
