= Wisconsin's 67th Assembly district =

American legislative district in northwest Wisconsin

Wisconsin's 67th State Assembly district
- 2024 map defined in 2023 Wisc. Act 94; 2022 map defined in Johnson v. Wisconsin Elections Commission; 2011 map was defined in 2011 Wisc. Act 43
Assemblymember
David Armstrong; R–Rice Lake
since January 6, 2025 (1 years)
- Demographics: 92.51% White; 1.53% Black; 1.98% Hispanic; 0.92% Asian; 2.15% Native American; 0.09% Hawaiian/Pacific Islander
- Population (2020) • Voting age: 60,062; 47,121
- Website: Official website
- Notes: Northwest Wisconsin

The 67th Assembly district of Wisconsin is one of 99 districts in the Wisconsin State Assembly. Located in northwest Wisconsin, the district comprises all of Barron County, and most of the northern half of Dunn County, along with part of northwest Chippewa County. It includes the cities of Barron, Chetek, Cumberland, and Rice Lake, and the villages of Almena, Boyceville, Cameron, Colfax, Dallas, Haugen, New Auburn, Prairie Farm, Ridgeland, and Wheeler. The district is represented by Republican David Armstrong, since January 2025; Armstrong previously represented the 75th district from 2021 to 2025.

The 67th Assembly district is located within Wisconsin's 23rd Senate district, along with the 68th and 69th Assembly districts.

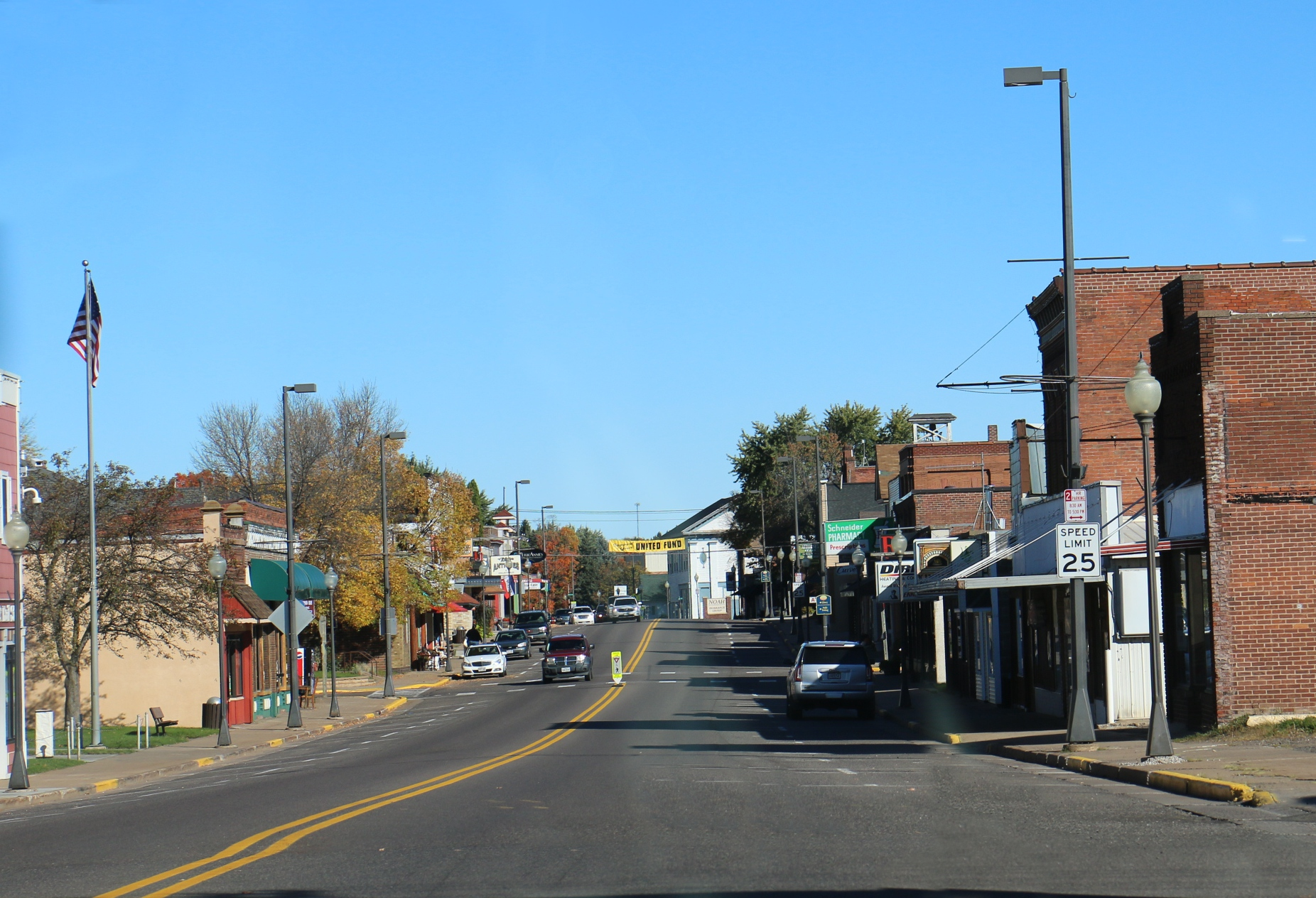
Cumberland, Wisconsin

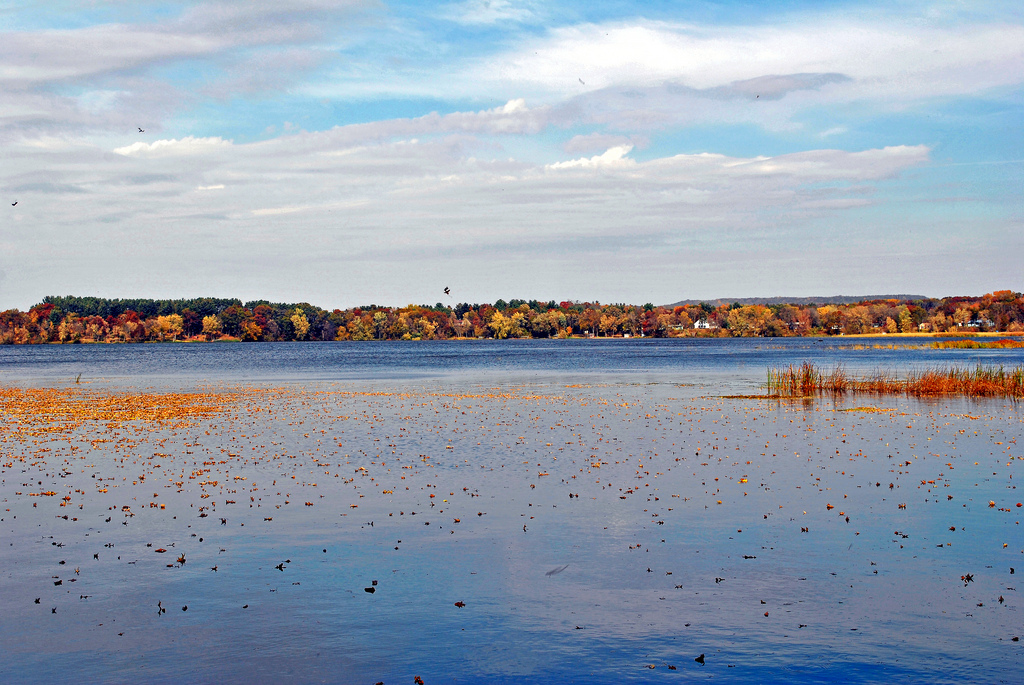
Tainter Lake

== List of past representatives ==
List of representatives to the Wisconsin State Assembly from the 67th district
Member	Party	Residence	Counties Represented	Term start	Term end	Ref.
District created
Terry A. Willkom	Dem.	Chippewa Falls	Chippewa	January 1, 1973	January 3, 1977	
Steven C. Brist	Dem.	Chippewa Falls	Chippewa	January 3, 1977	January 1, 1979	
David R. Hopkins	Rep.	Eagle Point	Chippewa	January 1, 1979	January 3, 1983	
Peggy Rosenzweig	Rep.	Wauwatosa	Milwaukee	January 3, 1983	January 7, 1985	
Steven C. Brist	Dem.	Tainter	Chippewa, Dunn, Rusk	January 7, 1985	January 5, 1987	
Leo Richard Hamilton	Dem.	Chippewa Falls	Chippewa, Dunn, Rusk	January 5, 1987	January 4, 1993	
Michael O. Wilder	Dem.	Chippewa Falls	Chippewa, Dunn	January 4, 1993	January 6, 1997	
Tom Sykora	Rep.	Chippewa Falls	Chippewa, Dunn	January 6, 1997	January 6, 2003	
Jeffrey Wood	Rep.	Chippewa Falls	Barron, Chippewa, Dunn	January 6, 2003	July 8, 2008	
Jeffrey Wood	Ind.	Chippewa Falls	Barron, Chippewa, Dunn	July 8, 2008	January 3, 2011	
Tom Larson	Rep.	Colfax	Chippewa, Dunn	January 3, 2011	January 3, 2017	
Rob Summerfield	Rep.	Bloomer	Chippewa, Dunn	January 3, 2017	January 6, 2025	
Rob Summerfield	Rep.	Bloomer	Chippewa, Dunn, Eau Claire	January 3, 2017	January 6, 2025	
David Armstrong	Rep.	Rice Lake	Barron, Chippewa, Dunn	January 6, 2025	Current	
