= John Marshall High School (Wisconsin) =

Milwaukee Marshall High School

Location
- 4141 North 64th Street; Milwaukee, Wisconsin 53216; United States; 43.093095°N 87.993317°W

Information
- Type: Public high school
- School district: Milwaukee Public Schools
- Principal: Barry Applewhite
- Teaching staff: 44.78 (on an FTE basis)
- Grades: 9-12
- Enrollment: 639 (2024-2025)
- Student to teacher ratio: 14.27
- Color
- Team name: Eagles
- Website: Official Website

John Marshall High School is a public high school located in Milwaukee, Wisconsin (United States). John Marshall is part of the Milwaukee Public Schools. Formerly a junior-senior high school, the 7th and 8th grades were dropped in 1979 to expand the growing senior high. Recently, the school was redesigned into three divisions: Marshall Montessori IB High School, High School of Sports Education and Employment, and Foster & Williams Visual Communication Campus. As of 2009, the school merged with Samuel Morse Middle School for the Gifted and Talented to form Samuel J. Morse ● John Marshall School for the Gifted & Talented.

== Incidents ==
In August 2021 the school announced new safety measures after several days of cars driving on sidewalks and lawns at dismissal time.

== Athletics ==
The school's mascot is the Eagles and the colors are Columbia Blue and Scarlet. The Marshall Eagles have several sports teams including:

- Baseball
- Basketball
- Cross Country
- Football
- Soccer
- Track and Field
- Volleyball
- Wrestling

The boys cross country team won a state championship in 1970.

== Demographics ==
John Marshall High School's demographics as of 2017–2018 were:

- 0.1% Native American/Alaska Native, 1 student
- 6.2% Asian, 50 students
- 85.0% Black, 681 students
- 2.6% Hispanic, 21 students
- 0% Native Hawaiian/Pacific Islander, 0 students
- 4.5% White, 36 students
- 1.5% Two or more race, 12 students

== Notable graduates ==
- Michael J. Barber, engineer and Chief Diversity Officer of General Electric
- Mandela Barnes, 45th Lieutenant Governor of Wisconsin, former state legislator
- David Berger, Wisconsin state senator
- David Cullen, Wisconsin state representative and county supervisor
- Floyd Heard, Olympic sprinter
- Derrick Jackson, Boston Globe columnist and 2001 Pulitzer Prize finalist
- Warren Kozak, writer and journalist
- Shirley Krug, Wisconsin state representative, first woman to become a Democratic Party floor leader in the Wisconsin Legislature
- Mona Sutphen, lobbyist, foreign service officer and White House aide under Clinton and Obama
- Mike Taylor, NBA Player
- George Tillman Jr., filmmaker and television producer
- Sheldon Wasserman, Wisconsin state legislator and physician
