= David Berger (Wisconsin politician) =

American politician (born 1946)

Member of the Wisconsin Senate from the 5th district
- In office January 6, 1975 – January 3, 1983
- Preceded by: Wilfred Schuele
- Succeeded by: Mordecai Lee

Member of the Wisconsin State Assembly
- In office January 1971 – January 6, 1975
- Succeeded by: Michael G. Kirby
- Constituency: Milwaukee 18th District (1971-1973); 13th District (1973-1975)

Personal details
- Born: David G. Berger; October 27, 1946 (age 79) Milwaukee, Wisconsin
- Party: Democratic
- Education: University of Wisconsin–Madison

David G. Berger (born October 27, 1946) is a former member of the Wisconsin State Assembly and Wisconsin State Senate.

== Early life and education ==
Berger was born on October 27, 1946, in Milwaukee, Wisconsin. He is a graduate of the John Marshall High School, the University of Wisconsin–Madison.

== Career ==
Berger was a member of the Senate from 1975 until 1983. Previously, he was elected to the Assembly in 1970. He is a Democrat.
