= David Cullen (politician) =

American politician (born 1960)

Treasurer of Milwaukee County
- Incumbent
- Assumed office November 2014
- Preceded by: Daniel J. Diliberti

Member of the Milwaukee County Board of Supervisors from the 15th district
- In office April 16, 2012 – November 2014
- Preceded by: Lynne D. De Bruin
- Succeeded by: Eddie Cullen

Member of the Wisconsin State Assembly
- In office January 4, 1993 – January 7, 2013
- Preceded by: Thomas Seery
- Succeeded by: Rob Hutton
- Constituency: 13th Assembly district
- In office May 15, 1990 – January 4, 1993
- Preceded by: Tom Barrett
- Succeeded by: Peggy Rosenzweig
- Constituency: 14th Assembly district

Personal details
- Born: February 1, 1960 (age 66) Milwaukee, Wisconsin, U.S.
- Party: Democratic
- Spouse: Julie Kamerling
- Children: 2
- Education: University of Wisconsin, Madison (BS); Marquette University (JD)
- Profession: Attorney
- Website: Official website

David A. Cullen (born February 1, 1960) is an American lawyer and Democratic politician from Milwaukee, Wisconsin. He is the current treasurer of Milwaukee County. Prior to his election as treasurer in 2014, he served 23 years as a member of the Wisconsin State Assembly (1990–2013), two years on the Milwaukee County Board of Supervisors (2012–2014), and 7 years on the Milwaukee Public Schools Board of Education (1983–1990).

== Early life and education ==
David Cullen was born on February 1, 1960, in Milwaukee, Wisconsin. His father died of a heart attack a when he was an infant. He graduated from Milwaukee's John Marshall High School, and went on to attend the University of Wisconsin–Madison, where he earned his bachelor's degree in secondary education in 1981. He continued his education at Marquette University Law School, and obtained his J.D. in 1984.

== Political career ==
=== School board ===
While still attending law school, Cullen was elected to his first public office. He was elected to the Milwaukee Public Schools board of education and served continuously on the board until 1990. The year after his election to the school board, Cullen made his first run for Wisconsin State Assembly, seeking the Democratic Party nomination in what was then the 15th Assembly district. The 1984 election was the first election on new legislative maps, and there was no incumbent living in the new district, comprising precincts of Milwaukee's northwest. The Democratic primary ultimately attracted three other contenders. Cullen came in a respectable second behind Shirley Krug, who went on to win the seat.

In 1987, Cullen was chosen as president of the Milwaukee school board. His most significant contribution in this role came in the settlement of a years-old lawsuit, in which the Milwaukee school board had sued the state over racial segregation of Milwaukee-area schools. As school board president, Cullen participated in negotiations with then-governor Tommy Thompson, then-state superintendent Herbert J. Grover, and then-NAACP general counsel Grover Hankins. They reached a settlement with cooperation from the state and surrounding school districts, where minority students from Milwaukee would gain access to schools in Milwaukee's suburbs, as well as increased state financial assistance to Milwaukee schools.

=== State Assembly ===
In the fall of 1989, Cullen's state representative, Tom Barrett, was elected to the Wisconsin Senate, creating a vacancy in what was then the 14th Assembly district. Cullen entered the special election to fill the vacancy. As in 1984, the Democratic primary attracted several other candidates, but Cullen prevailed this time, receiving 47% of the vote over his three opponents. He went on to win the May 1, 1990, special election with 58% of the vote. Cullen took office two weeks later and won a full term in the Assembly that fall.

In 1992, a federal court conducted Wisconsin's legislative redistricting, and Cullen's district was significantly impacted. Under the new plan, he resided in the 13th Assembly district, a district that contained roughly the western half of his old district, plus more northwestern precincts of Milwaukee. Politically, the district was still safely Democratic, and Cullen easily won a second full term in 1992.

In the 1992 election, Tom Barrett was elected to the United States House of Representatives and vacated his state senate seat. Cullen decided to jump into another special election to try to succeed Barrett again, this time in the 5th Senate district. Cullen narrowly defeated fellow incumbent state representative Jeannette Bell in the Democratic primary, but fell short of Republican state representative Peggy Rosenzweig in the April 1993 special election, receiving 46% of the vote. Cullen was subsequently elected to four more terms in the Assembly on the 1992 maps.

Another redistricting occurred by federal court in 2002, and again radically transformed Cullen's district. The northern areas added in 1992 were all removed, the district instead stretched south through the eastern precincts of Wauwatosa, into the Bluemound Heights area and incorporating all of the territory of West Milwaukee. On the new map, Cullen won one of his closest elections of his career in 2002, when he defeated Republican Steve Adamczyk by just 517 votes. He increased his margin 2004, defeating newcomer Matt Adamczyk with 57% of the vote. He won handily in 2006 and 2010 and was unopposed in 2008.

=== County government ===
==== Milwaukee County Board of Supervisors ====
After the 2010 election, Republicans won full control of state government and implemented one of the most dramatic gerrymanders in the country. Cullen's district was eviscerated. Under the new map, he resided in the 14th Assembly district again, but nearly all of the Milwaukee wards had been removed, the district instead contained half of Wauwatosa and stretched west into the city of Brookfield, in Waukesha County. Cullen opted not to run in the new district, and instead ran for a seat on the Milwaukee County Board of Supervisors in the Sprin 2012 election. He was elected with 58% of the vote.

==== Milwaukee County Treasurer ====
In April 2014, Milwaukee County treasurer Daniel J. Diliberti announced he would retire effective May 12. His retirement necessitated a special election to fill the remaining years of his term. Cullen entered the race and faced former state treasurer Dawn Marie Sass in the Democratic Party primary election. Cullen narrowly prevailed with 53% of the vote, and faced no opponent in the general election. Cullen was sworn in shortly after the election, as the office was already vacant, and was subsequently elected to a full term in 2016, and re-elected in 2020, without facing opposition.

In 2024, Cullen turned back a Democratic primary challenge from former county official Ted Chisholm with over 66% of the vote and is unopposed in the general election.

== Personal life and family ==
David Cullen is one of six children born to Charles Edwin Cullen and his wife Beatrice June (née Chrisien).

Heart disease runs in the Cullen family, resulting in the deaths of Cullen's father and three brothers at relatively young ages. His father, Charles Cullen, died at age 40, in 1961. His older brother, Steve Cullen, was a member of the Milwaukee City Council from 1980 to 1992, and died at age 40 in 1995. Two other brothers, Paul G. Cullen, 53, and Timothy C. Cullen, 51, died on back-to-back days in December 2002.

David Cullen married Julie Kamerling; they reside in Milwaukee and have two adult children, Katie and Eddie. Eddie Cullen was elected to the Milwaukee County Board of Supervisors, serving from 2015 to 2022, and now works as a spokesman for the board.

== Electoral history ==
=== Wisconsin Assembly, 15th district (1984) ===
Year	Election	Date	Elected				Defeated				Total	Plurality
1984	Primary	Sep. 11	Shirley Krug	Democratic	2,390	52.77%	David Cullen	Dem.	1,756	38.77%	4,529	634
1984	Primary	Sep. 11	Shirley Krug	Democratic	2,390	52.77%	Norman Goldberg	Dem.	275	6.07%	4,529	634
1984	Primary	Sep. 11	Shirley Krug	Democratic	2,390	52.77%	Arthur W. McConkey	Dem.	108	2.38%	4,529	634

=== Wisconsin Assembly, 14th district (1990) ===
Year	Election	Date	Elected				Defeated				Total	Plurality
1990 special	Special; Primary	Apr. 3	David Cullen	Democratic	2,904	47.48%	Daniel M. Chudnow	Dem.	2,470	40.39%	6,116	434
1990 special	Special; Primary	Apr. 3	David Cullen	Democratic	2,904	47.48%	Vivian Redd Fehr	Dem.	688	11.25%	6,116	434
1990 special	Special; Primary	Apr. 3	David Cullen	Democratic	2,904	47.48%	John Sokoly	Dem.	54	0.88%	6,116	434
1990 special	Special	May 1	David Cullen	Democratic	2,347	58.56%	Steven A. Woehrer	Rep.	1,661	41.44%	4,008	686
1990	Primary	Sep. 11	David Cullen (inc)	Democratic	2,648	81.25%	Ronald J. Johnson	Dem.	611	18.75%	3,259	2,037
1990	General	Nov. 6	David Cullen (inc)	Democratic	11,120	100.0%	--unopposed--				11,120	11,120

=== Wisconsin Senate (1993) ===
Year	Election	Date	Elected				Defeated				Total	Plurality
1993	Primary	Feb. 16	David Cullen	Democratic	9,321	51.01%	Jeannette Bell	Dem.	8,953	48.99%	18,274	368
1993	Special	Apr. 6	Peggy Rosenzweig	Republican	18,713	52.01%	David Cullen	Dem.	16,634	46.23%	35,978	2,079
1993	Special	Apr. 6	Peggy Rosenzweig	Republican	18,713	52.01%	John T. Streicher	Lib.	631	1.75%	35,978	2,079

=== Wisconsin Assembly, 13th district (1992–2010) ===
Year	Election	Date	Elected				Defeated				Total	Plurality
1992	General	Nov. 3	David Cullen	Democratic	15,401	62.98%	James J. Ryan	Rep.	9,054	37.02%	24,455	6,347
1994	General	Nov. 8	David Cullen (inc)	Democratic	10,079	56.27%	Doug Weare	Rep.	7,833	43.73%	17,912	2,246
1996	General	Nov. 5	David Cullen (inc)	Democratic	12,232	57.45%	Dave Schultz	Rep.	9,058	42.55%	21,290	3,174
1998	General	Nov. 3	David Cullen (inc)	Democratic	11,864	71.41%	Liliana Amparo	Rep.	4,344	26.15%	16,615	7,520
1998	General	Nov. 3	David Cullen (inc)	Democratic	11,864	71.41%	John Washburn	Lib.	230	1.38%	16,615	7,520
1998	General	Nov. 3	David Cullen (inc)	Democratic	11,864	71.41%	Wendell J. Harris Sr.	Ind.	177	1.07%	16,615	7,520
2000	General	Nov. 7	David Cullen (inc)	Democratic	18,080	98.85%	--unopposed--				18,290	17,870
2002	General	Nov. 5	David Cullen (inc)	Democratic	10,418	51.19%	Steve Adamczyk	Rep.	9,901	48.65%	20,353	517
2004	General	Nov. 2	David Cullen (inc)	Democratic	17,765	56.84%	Matt Adamczyk	Rep.	13,428	42.96%	31,256	4,337
2006	General	Nov. 7	David Cullen (inc)	Democratic	15,216	64.34%	Rick Baas	Rep.	8,402	35.53%	23,648	6,814
2008	General	Nov. 4	David Cullen (inc)	Democratic	21,963	98.42%	--unopposed--				22,316	21,610
2010	General	Nov. 2	David Cullen (inc)	Democratic	14,364	76.25%	Lisa R. Becker	Rep.	4,409	23.41%	18,837	9,955

=== Milwaukee County treasurer (2014, 2016, 2020) ===
Year	Election	Date	Elected				Defeated				Total	Plurality
2014	Primary	Aug. 12	David Cullen	Democratic	39,370	52.88%	Dawn Marie Sass	Dem.	34,641	46.53%	74,450	4,729
2014	General	Nov. 4	David Cullen	Democratic	262,670	97.93%	--Unopposed--				268,223	257,117
2016	General	Nov. 8	David Cullen (inc)	Democratic	309,930	98.43%	--Unopposed--				314,879	304,981
2020	General	Nov. 3	David Cullen (inc)	Democratic	344,967	98.35%	--Unopposed--				350,753	339,181

Wisconsin State Assembly
Preceded by Tom Barrett	Member of the Wisconsin State Assembly from the 14th district May 15, 1990 – January 4, 1993	Succeeded by Peggy Rosenzweig
Preceded by Thomas Seery	Member of the Wisconsin State Assembly from the 13th district January 4, 1993 – January 7, 2013	Succeeded by Rob Hutton
Political offices
Preceded by Daniel J. Diliberti	Treasurer of Milwaukee County; November 2014 – present	Incumbent
