= Thomas A. Hauke =

American attorney and politician (born 1938)

Thomas Hauke

Majority Leader of the Wisconsin Assembly
- In office January 5, 1987 – January 7, 1991
- Preceded by: Dismas Becker
- Succeeded by: David Travis

Member of the Wisconsin State Assembly
- In office January 7, 1985 – January 4, 1993
- Preceded by: John Antaramian
- Succeeded by: John La Fave
- Constituency: 23rd District
- In office January 3, 1983 – January 7, 1985
- Preceded by: Marcia P. Coggs
- Succeeded by: Marcia P. Coggs
- Constituency: 18th District
- In office January 1, 1973 – January 3, 1983
- Preceded by: District created
- Succeeded by: John Antaramian
- Constituency: 23rd District

Personal details
- Born: May 4, 1938 (age 88) Detroit, Michigan
- Party: Democratic
- Spouse: Susan Johnson
- Education: Marquette University (BS, JD); Milwaukee School of Engineering (MS)

Thomas A. Hauke (born May 4, 1938) is an American attorney and retired politician. A member of the Democratic Party, he represented West Allis and west central Milwaukee County in the Wisconsin State Assembly for 20 years (1973–1993), including four years as Majority Leader (1987–1991).

== Early life and education ==
Hauke was born in Detroit in 1938. He earned a Bachelor of Science from Marquette University, Juris Doctor from the Marquette University Law School, and Master of Science from the Milwaukee School of Engineering.

== Career ==
Prior to entering politics, Hauke worked as an attorney and electrical engineer.

Hauke was elected to the Wisconsin State Assembly in 1972 and served until 1992, representing the 23rd district, except for one term in 1983-1984 when he represented the 18th district. During his tenure in the Assembly, he served as Majority Leader for the 1987-1988 and 1989-1990 sessions. During his final term in the Assembly, Hauke was fined for accepting illegal gifts from Gary Goyke, a State Senator and lobbyist.

== Personal life ==
Hauke lived in West Allis, Wisconsin. Hauke was married to Susan (née Johnson) for 53 years. Susan died in 2019.

Wisconsin State Assembly
New district	Member of the Wisconsin State Assembly from the 23rd district January 1, 1973 – January 3, 1983	Succeeded by John Antaramian
Preceded by Marcia P. Coggs	Member of the Wisconsin State Assembly from the 18th district January 3, 1983 – January 7, 1985	Succeeded by Marcia P. Coggs
Preceded by John Antaramian	Member of the Wisconsin State Assembly from the 23rd district January 7, 1985 – January 4, 1993	Succeeded by John La Fave
Preceded by Dismas Becker	Majority Leader of the Wisconsin Assembly; January 5, 1987 – January 7, 1991	Succeeded by David Travis
