= Dale Kooyenga =

21st century American politician (born 1979)

Dale P. Kooyenga
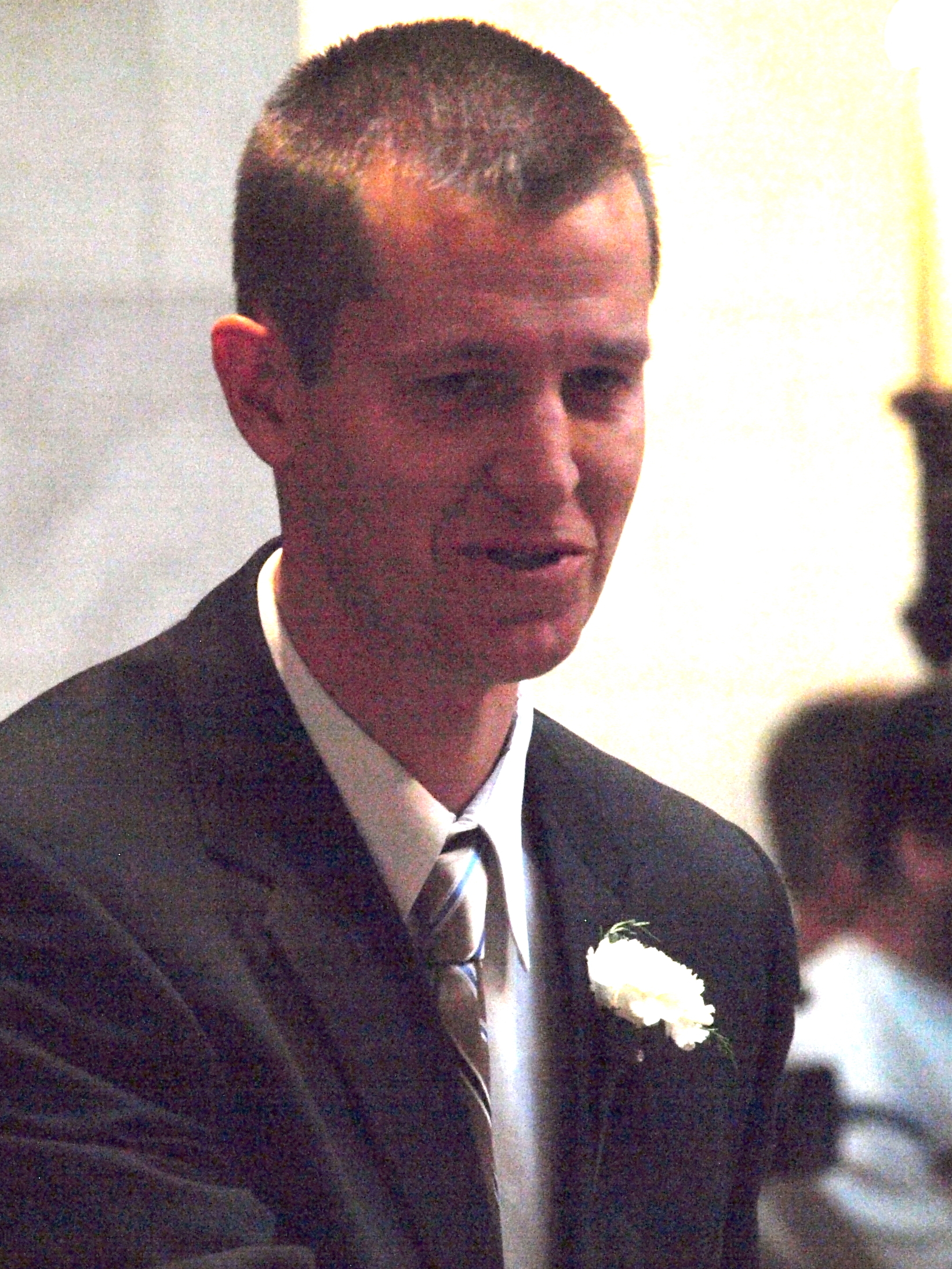
- Kooyenga in 2013

Member of the Wisconsin Senate from the 5th district
- In office January 7, 2019 – January 2, 2023
- Preceded by: Leah Vukmir
- Succeeded by: Rob Hutton

Member of the Wisconsin State Assembly from the 14th district
- In office January 3, 2011 – January 7, 2019
- Preceded by: Leah Vukmir
- Succeeded by: Robyn Vining

Personal details
- Born: February 12, 1979 (age 47) Oak Lawn, Illinois, U.S.
- Party: Republican
- Education: Lakeland College (BA); Marquette University (MBA)
- Website: Official website

Military service
- Allegiance: United States
- Branch/service: United States Army; United States Army Reserve
- Years of service: 2005–present
- Rank: Lieutenant Colonel
- Battles/wars: Iraq War
- Awards: Bronze Star Medal

Dale Kooyenga (born February 12, 1979) is an American C.P.A. and Republican politician from Waukesha County, Wisconsin. He is the president of the Metropolitan Milwaukee Association of Commerce, the main business advocacy organization for Milwaukee, Waukesha, Ozaukee, and Washington counties. He previously served four years as a member of the Wisconsin Senate (2019–2023) and eight years in the Wisconsin State Assembly (2011–2019), representing eastern Waukesha County.

== Early life and education ==
Born in Oak Lawn, Illinois, Kooyenga grew up as the oldest of four siblings in the southwest Chicago suburb of Evergreen Park, Illinois. He attended Chicago Christian High School and went on to attend Moraine Valley Community College. Kooyenga played basketball at Moraine Valley and was subsequently recruited by Lakeland College in Sheboygan, Wisconsin, where he played NCAA Division III basketball and graduated with honors. Kooyenga earned a bachelor's degree in 2000 and MBA from Marquette University in 2007.

Kooyenga has also completed the Young American Leaders Program in Civic Engagement through the Harvard Business School as well as the U.S. Army John F. Kennedy Special Warfare Center and School's Civil Affairs course.

He is an Iraq War veteran. He continues to serve in the Army Reserve as a Lieutenant Colonel in Civil Affairs Corps.

He is married and a father of four children.

== Career ==
Kooyenga moved to Milwaukee in 2001, passed the Certified Public Accounting exam, and began working for accounting firm KPMG. He worked at KPMG as a senior manager until 2011. Kooyenga then served as chief financial officer for Milwaukee-based information technology services and consulting firm Mpirik starting in January 2015, a role he served in until May 2017.

In May 2017, Kooyenga became chief financial officer for Stonehouse Water Technologies, LLC, a Milwaukee firm that engineers and manufactures water purification systems for residential homes, commercial buildings and farms.

From June 2019 until the present day, Kooyenga has served as a board member and consultant for Alligator Holdings, an early stage investor group that tries to bring products to market through strategic investments.

=== U.S. Army ===
In 2005, Kooyenga and his two brothers joined the United States Army, a decision they made as a result of the terrorist attacks of September 11, 2001. He attended the United States Army's basic training, the Officer Candidate School and the Military Intelligence Officer Course.

After completing the year-long Army training, Kooyenga returned to his career in public accounting. Kooyenga was deployed to active duty in Iraq from January 2008 to November 2008. Although trained as a Military Intelligence Officer, Kooyenga was assigned as the 4th Infantry Division's Officer in Charge of Economic Development in Baghdad, Iraq. Kooyenga was awarded the Bronze Star for his service. His experience in Iraq overseeing the construction of roads and bridges, as well as the death of a friend at the hands of a suicide bomber, inspired his interest in politics.

Kooyenga still serves in the U.S. Army Reserve and, in June 2022, was selected for the rank of lieutenant colonel.

=== Political career ===
In Fall 2010, Kooyenga was elected to represent the 14th District for the Wisconsin State Assembly. He was sworn into office on January 3, 2011. Kooyenga endorsed Mitt Romney in the 2012 presidential election.

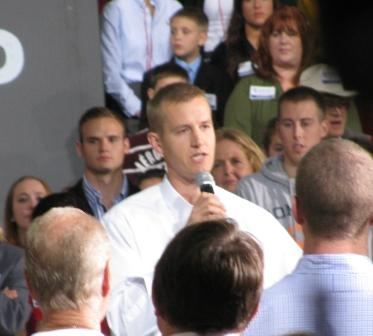
Kooyenga speaking at an October 2012 rally for the Mitt Romney 2012 presidential campaign

During his time in the Assembly, Kooyenga emerged as a conservative star as part of the "CPA Caucus," a group of four certified public accountants in the Assembly who specialized in analyzing state finances. The group's work led to the discovery of a previously unreported $650 million surplus within the books of University of Wisconsin System institutions. That discovery led to an 8-year tuition freeze, which was lifted in 2021 with Kooyenga's support. Kooyenga said as a result of the tuition freeze, the UW System "has dramatically increased their transparency." Kooyenga later praised the UW System for voluntarily freezing tuition for another year.

In May 2017, Kooyenga removed a protester's sign, which had a valid permit, from a public area of the Wisconsin State Capitol which was critical of President Donald Trump and Republicans. Kooyenga removed the sign because he thought it was inappropriate. The owner filed a lawsuit against Kooyenga and the State of Wisconsin for violating his First Amendment rights, which led to the State paying him $30,000 to settle the lawsuit in April 2018. Kooyenga repaid the $30,000 to the state in July 2018.

Kooyenga announced his campaign for Wisconsin State Senate's 5th District in September 2017, seeking to fill the seat left vacant by Leah Vukmir, who was running for the U.S. Senate. He won the November 2018 election with 51.15% of the vote against Democratic opponent Julie Henszey. During his time in the Senate, Kooyenga worked on a range of issues related to education, tax cuts and budgeting, professional licensure and healthcare. In August 2019, he and Republican Amy Loudenbeck introduced telehealth legislation that was signed into law months before the COVID-19 pandemic began. As a member of the Joint Committee on Finance, Kooyenga also assisted in writing the 2021–2023 state budget and argued for conservative tax policy, including tax cuts.

In 2021, he introduced bipartisan legislation in the Wisconsin legislature to introduce ranked-choice voting (RCV). He argued that RCV would reduce polarization and extremism by removing incentives for legislators to cater to extremist elements within their parties. He also introduced an amendment to the state constitution to return oversight of federal funding to the state legislature as well as legislation to clean up industrial pollutants from the Milwaukee Estuary.

In April 2022, Kooyenga announced he would not seek re-election to the State Senate, citing his commitments to the U.S. Army, his private sector career, and his four children as reasons for stepping down from public service.

=== Metropolitan Milwaukee Association of Commerce ===
After leaving office, Kooyenga was selected as president of the Metropolitan Milwaukee Association of Commerce, the main business advocacy organization for Milwaukee, Waukesha, Ozaukee, and Washington counties. In April 2025, Kooyenga made headlines in Wisconsin when he spoke out against the new tariffs imposed by U.S. president Donald Trump, calling it "one of the largest tax increases in U.S. history". He also noted that business leaders were "scared" of speaking out and feared retaliation from the Trump government.

== Electoral history ==
=== Wisconsin Assembly (2010–2016) ===
| Year | Election | Date | Elected | | | | Defeated | | | | Total | Plurality |
|---|---|---|---|---|---|---|---|---|---|---|---|---|
| 2010 | Primary | Sep. 14 | Dale P. Kooyenga | Republican | 6,002 | 60.76% | David L. Coon | Rep. | 1,634 | 16.54% | 9,878 | 4,368 |
| 2010 | Primary | Sep. 14 | Dale P. Kooyenga | Republican | 6,002 | 60.76% | Chris Maurer | Rep. | 1,225 | 12.40% | 9,878 | 4,368 |
| 2010 | Primary | Sep. 14 | Dale P. Kooyenga | Republican | 6,002 | 60.76% | Ryan Schulander | Rep. | 397 | 4.02% | 9,878 | 4,368 |
| 2010 | Primary | Sep. 14 | Dale P. Kooyenga | Republican | 6,002 | 60.76% | Dennis Kaun | Rep. | 376 | 3.81% | 9,878 | 4,368 |
| 2010 | Primary | Sep. 14 | Dale P. Kooyenga | Republican | 6,002 | 60.76% | Michael E. Olen | Rep. | 225 | 2.28% | 9,878 | 4,368 |
| 2010 | General | Nov. 2 | Dale P. Kooyenga | Republican | 16,481 | 98.92% | --Unopposed-- | | | | 16,661 | 16,301 |
| 2012 | General | Nov. 6 | Dale Kooyenga (inc) | Republican | 20,976 | 59.07% | Chris Rockwood | Dem. | 14,490 | 40.81% | 35,508 | 6,486 |
| 2014 | General | Nov. 4 | Dale Kooyenga (inc) | Republican | 21,954 | 96.37% | --Unopposed-- | | | | 22,781 | 21,127 |
| 2016 | General | Nov. 8 | Dale Kooyenga (inc) | Republican | 20,001 | 57.19% | Chris Rockwood | Dem. | 14,934 | 42.70% | 34,975 | 5,067 |

=== Wisconsin Senate (2018) ===
| Year | Election | Date | Elected | | | | Defeated | | | | Total | Plurality |
|---|---|---|---|---|---|---|---|---|---|---|---|---|
| 2018 | General | Nov. 6 | Dale Kooyenga | Republican | 47,836 | 51.15% | Julie Henszey | Dem. | 45,591 | 48.75% | 93,529 | 2,245 |

Wisconsin State Assembly
| Preceded by Leah Vukmir | Member of the Wisconsin State Assembly from the 14th district January 3, 2011 – January 7, 2019 | Succeeded by Robyn Vining |
Wisconsin Senate
| Preceded by Leah Vukmir | Member of the Wisconsin Senate from the 5th district January 7, 2019 – January 2, 2023 | Succeeded by Rob Hutton |
