= Dismas Becker =

American politician (1936–2010)

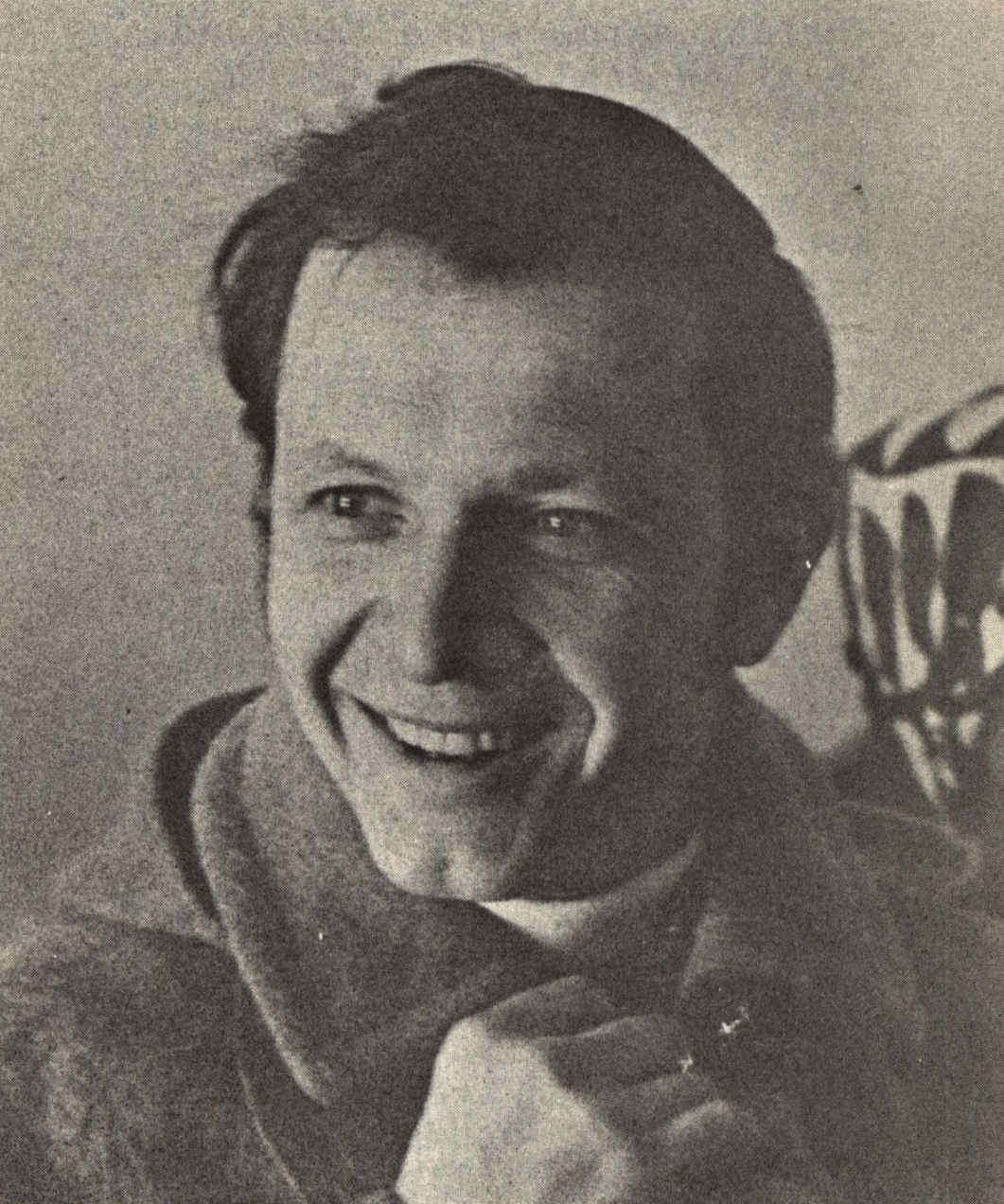
- Becker c. 1972

Majority Leader of the Wisconsin State Assembly
- In office January 7, 1985 – January 5, 1987
- Preceded by: Gary K. Johnson
- Succeeded by: Thomas A. Hauke

Member of the Wisconsin State Assembly
- In office January 7, 1985 – January 3, 1989
- Preceded by: Thomas Seery
- Succeeded by: Gwen Moore
- Constituency: 7th Assembly district
- In office January 3, 1983 – January 7, 1985
- Preceded by: Michael G. Kirby
- Succeeded by: Thomas Seery
- Constituency: 13th Assembly district
- In office November 7, 1977 – January 3, 1983
- Preceded by: Peter J. Tropman
- Succeeded by: James M. Stewart
- Constituency: 32nd Assembly district

Personal details
- Born: Paul Vincent Becker; September 16, 1936 Milwaukee, Wisconsin, U.S.
- Died: September 19, 2010 (aged 74) Milwaukee, Wisconsin, U.S.
- Party: Democratic
- Spouse: E. Fay Anderson (m. 1975–2010)
- Children: 1 adopted son; 4 stepchildren
- Education: Saint Francis de Sales Seminary (B.A.); Marquette University (M.A.)
- Profession: Catholic priest, nonprofit director, politician

Dismas Becker (born Paul Vincent Becker; September 16, 1936 – September 19, 2010) was an American Democratic politician, civil rights activist, and former Discalced Carmelite friar and Catholic priest from Milwaukee, Wisconsin. He represented the near-west side of the city of Milwaukee for 12 years in the Wisconsin State Assembly, from 1977 to 1989, and served as majority leader during the 1985–1986 term. His chief legislative accomplishment was the 1980 expansion of Wisconsin's fair housing laws to prevent discrimination based on sex, race, religion, age, marital status, national origin, or handicap. Before joining the Legislature, he was a social justice activist and was a leader of the protest which occupied the Wisconsin State Capitol in 1969.

== Early life and pastoral career ==
Dismas Becker was born Paul Vincent Becker in 1936 in Milwaukee, Wisconsin. He was raised in Milwaukee, and after graduating from high school he entered the Order of Discalced Carmelites, where he received the religious name of "Dismas", named for the Good Thief depicted in the New Testament at the Crucifixion of Jesus. He used the name Dismas for his entire adult life, but did not have his name legally changed until 1986.

He graduated from St. Francis Seminary in 1960, becoming an ordained priest in 1964. He continued his education during that time, and earned a Master's degree in sociology from Marquette University in 1968.

In 1969, Becker became involved with the Rev. James Groppi, a fellow Catholic priest and activist leader in the city, in planning a demonstration at the Wisconsin State Capitol to demand action on welfare rights and school reform for the state's poorest communities. He arrived late to find that, led by Groppi, nearly a thousand activists from Milwaukee had occupied the State Assembly chamber and much of the rest of the Capitol. Groppi was arrested, leaving Becker the de facto leader of the protest. Becker proceeded to lead a protest on the lawn of the capitol several days later; after refusing to leave the capitol lawn, he was beaten on the head by a police officer.

In 1972, Becker helped to edit and publish a book giving voice to the poor women of the city: Welfare Mothers Speak Out: We Ain't Gonna Shuffle Anymore. That same year, Becker left the priesthood, agreeing with church leaders that his activist role was not compatible with his clerical duties.

== Political career ==
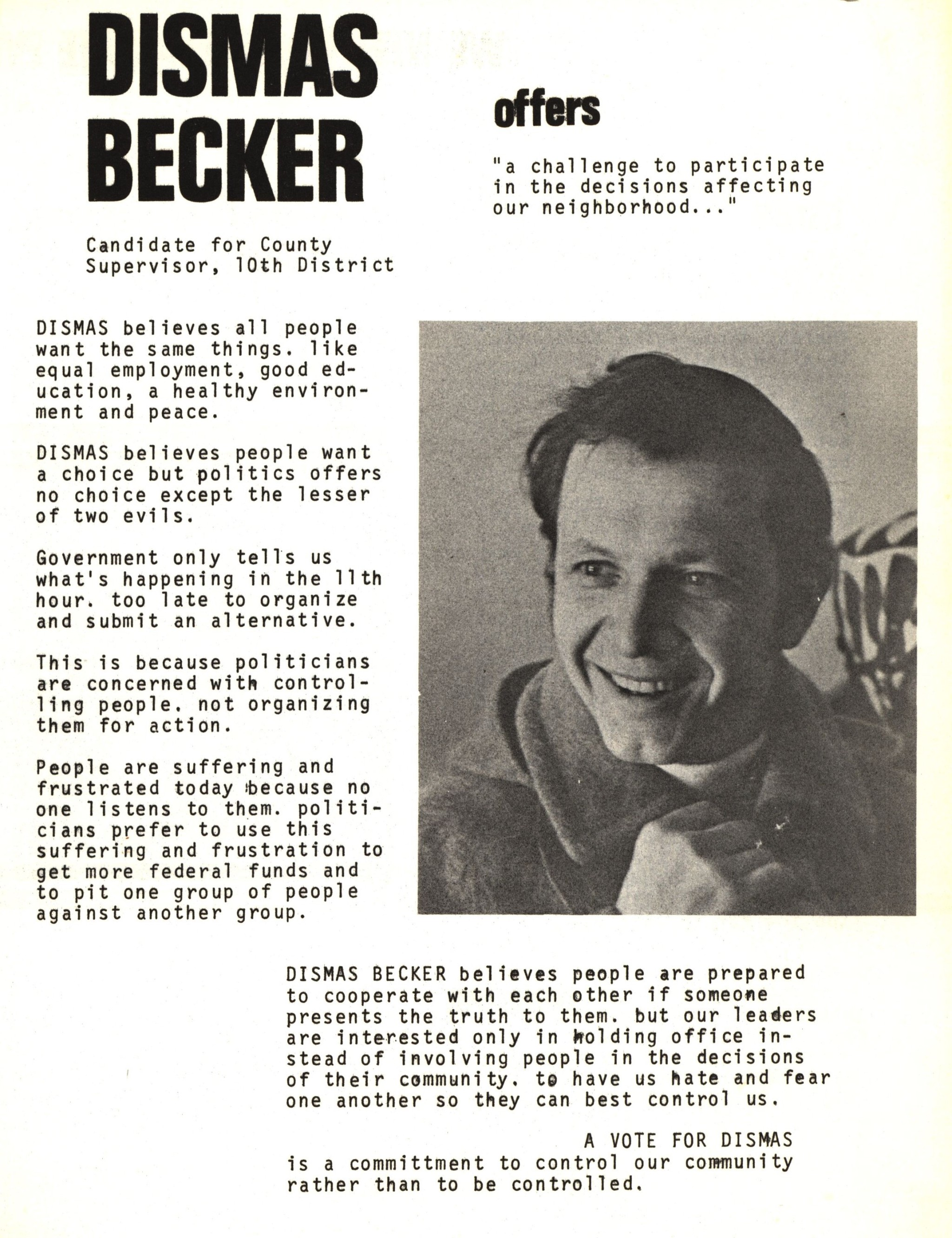
Cover of a pamphlet from Becker's campaign for Milwaukee County Supervisor, 1972

Becker continued his political activism. In 1977, his state representative, Peter J. Tropman, resigned from office in the middle of his term. A special election was called to fill the remainder of the term, and Becker decided to seek the Democratic Party nomination. His district at the time was the 32nd Assembly district, which then comprised areas of Midtown and the Washington Park neighborhoods on the near-west side of the city of Milwaukee. Becker faced a crowded primary field for the heavily Democratic district; he prevailed with 40% of the vote, finishing 213 votes ahead of his nearest opponent, Lawrence D. Wiemer. He went on to easily defeat Republican Everett J. Brom, receiving 65% in the October 1977 special election. He was elected to a full two-year term in 1978, after winning a Democratic primary rematch with Lawrence Wiemer.

During the 1979–1980 term, Becker had his most significant legislative achievement, shepherding the passage of a major expansion of Wisconsin's fair housing law, to outlaw discrimination based on sex, race, religion, age, marital status, national origin, or handicap. Becker faced no serious opposition for re-election in 1980. Around this time, he became a member of the Democratic Socialists of America when that organization was founded.

During the 1981–1982 term, the Legislature failed to agree on a redistricting plan, and a court-ordered redistricting plan was imposed by a federal court panel in 1982. Under the redistricting plan, Becker's district became the 13th Assembly district, but the core population of his district remained mostly intact. He faced another competitive primary in 1982, but faced no opposition in the general election.

During the 1983–1984 term, Becker was appointed to a coveted seat on the Legislature's budget-controlling Joint Committee on Finance, and also served as the Assembly's representative on the state Community Development Finance Authority. Also that term, the Legislature did finally pass a redistricting act, overriding the court-ordered plan; Becker's district boundaries were unchanged, but it was renumbered as the 7th Assembly district. Running in the 7th district, he won his fourth full term in 1984, and after the election, he was elected by the Assembly Democratic caucus to serve as majority leader for the 1985–1986 term. While serving as leader, Becker led a delegation of Wisconsin legislators on a controversial official visit to Cuba.

After the 1986 election, several challengers emerged to try to replace Becker as majority leader, and his colleagues quietly grumbled that he had been a weak leader with a disorganized leadership office. Despite the rebellion, Becker sought re-election to leadership anyway, but he was eliminated in the first round of voting, ultimately being succeeded by dark horse candidate Thomas A. Hauke. The rejection of Becker's leadership was likely also somewhat ideological, as he had been a strident opponent of attempted welfare cuts under Democratic governor Tony Earl; Democrats were seeking to moderate on the topic after Governor Earl's defeat by welfare reform advocate Tommy Thompson.

In the 1987 term, Becker served as chairman of the Assembly committee on housing and securities. In 1988, state senator John Norquist resigned his seat after he was elected mayor of Milwaukee. Rather than run for another term in the Assembly, Becker decided to run in the 1988 election to fill the remaining two years of Norquist's term in the Wisconsin Senate. At the time, the 3rd Senate district comprised much of the city's west side, along with much of downtown and the near-south side. Becker again faced a very crowded Democratic primary; he came in second out of six candidates in the primary, behind Milwaukee city councilmember Brian B. Burke.

Becker's Assembly term expired in January 1989, but he remained active in politics for several years after, initially working as a lobbyist in Madison for left-leaning causes.

In 1994, Becker attempted to return to elected office, running for the statewide office of state treasurer. In the Democratic primary, he faced fellow former legislator Steven C. Brist, of Dunn County. In that era, the office of state treasurer still had some power in state government, and Becker pledged that he would use his discretion as treasurer to refuse to sign checks from the state treasury for any appropriation created by creative use of the gubernatorial line-item veto. Becker narrowly defeated Brist in the primary, but fell quite short of his Republican opponent in the general election, receiving just 38% of the vote.

== Personal life and family ==
After leaving the priesthood, Becker married E. Fay Anderson—an African American mother of four—in 1975. He became stepfather to her four children, and they later adopted another child.

Becker died of cancer on September 19, 2010.

== Electoral history ==
=== Wisconsin Assembly, 32nd district (1977, 1978, 1980) ===
Year	Election	Date	Elected				Defeated				Total	Plurality
1977 (special)	Special; Primary	Sep. 6	Dismas Becker	Democratic	919	40.29%	Lawrence D. Wiemer	Dem.	706	30.95%	2,281	213
1977 (special)	Special; Primary	Sep. 6	Dismas Becker	Democratic	919	40.29%	C. Virginia Finn	Dem.	225	9.86%	2,281	213
1977 (special)	Special; Primary	Sep. 6	Dismas Becker	Democratic	919	40.29%	Guadalupe E. Renteria	Dem.	223	9.78%	2,281	213
1977 (special)	Special; Primary	Sep. 6	Dismas Becker	Democratic	919	40.29%	Louis J. Lepak	Dem.	120	5.26%	2,281	213
1977 (special)	Special; Primary	Sep. 6	Dismas Becker	Democratic	919	40.29%	Daniel M. Kile	Dem.	88	3.86%	2,281	213
1977 (special)	Special	Oct. 4	Dismas Becker	Democratic	1,154	64.94%	Everett J. Brom	Rep.	571	32.13%	1,777	583
1977 (special)	Special	Oct. 4	Dismas Becker	Democratic	1,154	64.94%	Alden K. Haugen	Ind.	52	2.93%	1,777	583
1978	Primary	Sep. 12	Dismas Becker (inc)	Democratic	2,136	66.07%	Lawrence D. Wiemer	Dem.	1,097	33.93%	3,233	1,039
1978	General	Nov. 7	Dismas Becker (inc)	Democratic	5,099	93.54%	Alden K. Haugen	Ind.	352	6.46%	5,451	4,747
1980	General	Nov. 4	Dismas Becker (inc)	Democratic	8,023	95.10%	Alden K. Haugen	Ind.	413	4.90%	8,436	7,610

=== Wisconsin Assembly, 13th district (1982) ===
Year	Election	Date	Elected				Defeated				Total	Plurality
1982	Primary	Sep. 14	Dismas Becker	Democratic	2,408	62.86%	Gerhard Stefan	Dem.	1,423	37.14%	3,831	985
1982	General	Nov. 2	Dismas Becker	Democratic	7,269	100.0%	--unopposed--				7,269	

=== Wisconsin Assembly, 7th district (1984, 1986) ===
Year	Election	Date	Elected				Defeated				Total	Plurality
1984	Primary	Sep. 11	Dismas Becker	Democratic	989	73.70%	Steven W. Green	Dem.	353	26.30%	1,342	636
1984	General	Nov. 6	Dismas Becker	Democratic	13,084	100.0%	--unopposed--				13,084	
1986	General	Nov. 4	Dismas Becker (inc)	Democratic	5,587	72.95%	John F. Baumgartner	Rep.	2,072	27.05%	7,659	3,515

=== Wisconsin Senate (1988) ===
Year	Election	Date	Elected				Defeated				Total	Plurality
1988 (special)	Special; Primary	Sep. 13	Brian B. Burke	Democratic	5,791	32.94%	Dismas Becker	Dem.	4,016	22.85%	17,579	1,775
1988 (special)	Special; Primary	Sep. 13	Brian B. Burke	Democratic	5,791	32.94%	David DeBruin	Dem.	2,907	16.54%	17,579	1,775
1988 (special)	Special; Primary	Sep. 13	Brian B. Burke	Democratic	5,791	32.94%	Michael S. Whittow	Dem.	2,719	15.47%	17,579	1,775
1988 (special)	Special; Primary	Sep. 13	Brian B. Burke	Democratic	5,791	32.94%	Gregory G. Gorak	Dem.	1,787	10.17%	17,579	1,775
1988 (special)	Special; Primary	Sep. 13	Brian B. Burke	Democratic	5,791	32.94%	Federico Zaragoza	Dem.	359	2.04%	17,579	1,775

=== Wisconsin state treasurer (1994) ===
Wisconsin State Treasurer Election, 1994
Party	Candidate	Votes	%	±%
Democratic Primary, September 13, 1994
Democratic	Dismas Becker	62,261	51.87%	
Democratic	Steven C. Brist	57,779	48.13%	
Plurality		4,482	3.73%	
Total votes		120,040	100.0%	
General Election, November 8, 1994
Republican	Jack Voight	812,795	56.15%	+7.44pp
Democratic	Dismas Becker	557,212	38.49%	−9.12pp
Progressive	Kathleen Chung	43,493	3.00%	
Libertarian	Shawn Angela Kaye	34,118	2.36%	
Plurality		255,583	17.66%	+16.56pp
Total votes		1,447,618	100.0%	+13.07%
Republican hold				

Party political offices
Preceded by Charles P. Smith	Democratic nominee for Treasurer of Wisconsin; 1994	Succeeded by Dawn Marie Sass
Wisconsin State Assembly
Preceded by Peter J. Tropman	Member of the Wisconsin State Assembly from the 32nd district November 7, 1977 – January 3, 1983	Succeeded by James M. Stewart
Preceded by Michael G. Kirby	Member of the Wisconsin State Assembly from the 13th district January 3, 1983 – January 7, 1985	Succeeded by Thomas Seery
Preceded by Thomas Seery	Member of the Wisconsin State Assembly from the 7th district January 7, 1985 – January 3, 1989	Succeeded by Gwen Moore
Preceded by Gary K. Johnson	Majority leader of the Wisconsin State Assembly; January 7, 1985 – January 5, 1987	Succeeded by Thomas A. Hauke
