= Michael J. Barber =

American engineer and executive

- Born: September 16, 1960 (age 66); Milwaukee, Wisconsin, U.S.
- Education: Milwaukee School of Engineering (BS, 1982)
- Occupations: Engineer, Corporate Executive
- Known for: X-ray imaging systems, Digital X-ray detector platform
- Board member of: Catalent, Exact Sciences, Green Bay Packers, Dentsply Sirona
- Spouse: Jackie Herd-Barber
- Awards: Fellow, American Institute for Medical and Biological Engineering (2014); Member, National Academy of Engineering (2023)
- Engineering career
- Projects: GE HealthCare Healthymagination, First touch-screen X-ray interface

Michael J. Barber (born September 16, 1960) is an American engineer who is an executive at General Electric. His research considers X-ray electronics. He was elected Fellow of the American Institute for Medical and Biological Engineering in 2014.

== Early life and education ==
Barber was born in Milwaukee and attended John Marshall High School. As a senior, he completed an internship at General Electric, where he was based in medical imaging. He studied electrical engineering at the Milwaukee School of Engineering. During this time, he started to complete more internships at GE, eventually working for them full time and completing his undergraduate degree in night classes.

== Research and career ==
In 1981, Barber was appointed to the electrical engineering team at General Electric. He started his career working on software for X-ray imaging systems. After eight years, he moved to computer tomography, where he developed firmware and hardware, and eventually to magnetic resonance imaging. Barber established Healthymagination, the GE strategy on global health, where he was responsible for reducing the costs associated with accessing care by more than 15%.

Barber was made Chief Technology Officer of General Electric Healthcare in 2007, chief operating officer in 2013, and President of computer tomography. Barber developed the United States' first touch-screen interface for X-ray imaging systems. He retired from his engineering role in 2020, and was made Chief Diversity Officer.

At General Electric, Barber developed the Human Resources program, including their African American forum. He serves on the Board of the National Action Council for Minorities in Engineering. He joined the board of Catalent in 2021.

== Awards and honors ==
- 2009 Black Enterprise Master of Innovation
- 2012 Honorary doctorate from the Milwaukee School of Engineering
- 2014 Elected Fellow of the American Institute for Medical and Biological Engineering
- 2018 Rotary Person of the Year
- 2022 NAACP Game Changer Award Winners in Education
- 2023 Elected member of National Academy of Engineering

== Personal life ==
Barber is married to Jackie Herd-Barber, an electrical engineer he met during his undergraduate degree. Together they have two children.
