= Rob Hutton =

American politician (born 1967)

Member of the Wisconsin Senate from the 5th district
- Incumbent
- Assumed office January 3, 2023
- Preceded by: Dale Kooyenga

Member of the Wisconsin State Assembly from the 13th district
- In office January 7, 2013 – January 4, 2021
- Preceded by: David Cullen
- Succeeded by: Sara Rodriguez

Member of the Board of Supervisors of Waukesha County, Wisconsin
- In office February 8, 2005 – April 2012

Personal details
- Born: Robert Brian Hutton; April 7, 1967 (age 59) Milwaukee, Wisconsin, U.S.
- Party: Republican
- Spouse: Patricia Evans (m. 1995)
- Children: 4
- Education: University of Wisconsin–Whitewater (B.A.)
- Profession: politician, businessman
- Website: Official website; Campaign website

Robert Brian Hutton (born April 7, 1967) is an American businessman and Republican politician from Waukesha County, Wisconsin. He is a member of the Wisconsin Senate, representing Wisconsin's 5th Senate district since January 2023. He previously served in the Wisconsin State Assembly from 2013 through 2020, and was a member of the Waukesha County board of supervisors from 2005 to 2012.

== Education and business career ==
Rob Hutton was born in Milwaukee, Wisconsin, in April 1967. He was raised and educated in nearby Brookfield, Wisconsin, graduating from Brookfield East High School in 1985. He went on to attend college at the University of Wisconsin–Whitewater, and earned a bachelor's degree in history in 1990.

Hutton went to work after graduation and moved to the neighboring village of Sussex, Wisconsin. During this era, he was hired as an executive at Rock Transfer & Storage—a storage and transportation company. Hutton and other executives of the business formed a partnership to purchase ownership of the company from former owner Richard Sheridan in 2005.

Since joining the Legislature, Hutton has become owner of two industrial coating businesses, Cornerstone Industries Inc. of Lake Geneva, Wisconsin, and Kettle Moraine Coatings of Jackson, Washington County, Wisconsin.

== Political career ==
Hutton made his first run for public office in April 2004. He ran for a seat on the Waukesha County board of supervisors, challenging incumbent supervisor Hank Carlson. Carlson won the election, but died less than a year later. Following his death, the board voted in February 2005 to appoint Hutton to finish out the remainder of his four-year term. Hutton was elected to a full four-year term in 2008, but did not run for re-election in 2012.

In 2012, Hutton announced that he would run as a Republican for the open 13th district seat in the Wisconsin State Assembly. The district had been dramatically reconfigured in the 2011 Republican legislative gerrymander, moving from a suburban Milwaukee district to stretch from western Milwaukee County into central Waukesha County. The Democratic incumbent, David Cullen, had opted to run for Milwaukee County board rather than face a difficult re-election with an almost completely new electorate.

Hutton faced two opponents in the Republican primary: Thomas J. Schellinger, a county supervisor and member of the Brookfield city council, and Nathaniel Ristow, who had worked as a lawyer in the office of Governor Scott Walker. All three candidates ran on roughly identical policy platforms of tax cuts and regulatory reforms, so attempted to distinguish themselves through their resumes. Hutton won the primary with 57% of the vote. He won the general election with 60% of the vote over Democrat John Pokrandt.

He was re-elected without opposition in 2014 and 2016, and his district was considered a safe Republican seat until the political coalition shifts prompted by the suburban backlash against the presidency of Donald Trump. In 2018, Hutton was challenged by Democrat Dennis McBride, who resigned earlier that year after serving ten years as a member of the Wauwatosa city council. The 13th district was one of the most hotly contested races in the state in 2018; Hutton prevailed with just 51% of the vote.

Hutton faced another contested race in 2020, from Democrat Sara Rodriguez, a hospital executive and former nurse. The 13th district was again one of the most competitive in the state, but this time Hutton was defeated. Rodriguez won the election with 51% of the vote.

He remained active in politics after his defeat, and in 2022 announced that he would run for Wisconsin Senate after incumbent Dale Kooyenga announced that he would not run for re-election. Hutton faced no opposition in the Republican primary. Although Wisconsin Republicans received a favorable ruling from the Wisconsin Supreme Court in 2022, allowing them to enact an even stronger gerrymander in the legislature, the 5th Senate district was still considered a competitive seat. His opponent in the general election was Democrat Jessica Katzenmeyer, a former postal worker and union organizer; Katzenmeyer was also the first trans woman to serve as a major party nominee for Wisconsin Senate. Hutton won the election, receiving 53% of the vote.

Since his election to the Senate, Hutton has served as chairman of the Senate Committee on Universities and Revenue, co-chair of the Joint Review Committee on Criminal Penalties, and member of the Committee on Judiciary and Public Safety. His district was significantly reconfigured in the court-ordered redistricting enacted in 2024, and is again projected to be one of the most competitive races in the state in 2026.

In 2025, Hutton voted against the 2025–2027 state budget, which had been negotiated on a bipartisan basis between Tony Evers, and the leadership of both parties in the state senate.

On January 22, 2026, Hutton announced he would not run for another term in the 2026 election—his district was projected to be one of the most competitive races in the state Senate.

== Personal life and family ==
Rob Hutton married Patricia "Patti" Evans of Lac La Belle, Wisconsin, in 1995. They met while attending high school together at Brookfield East. Rob and Patti have four adult children and still reside in Brookfield.

== Electoral history ==
=== Waukesha County board (2004, 2008) ===
Year	Election	Date	Elected				Defeated				Total	Plurality
2004	General	Apr. 6	Hank Carlson	Nonpartisan	502	54.21%	Rob Hutton	Non.	420	45.36%	926	82
2008	General	Apr. 1	Rob Hutton (inc)	Nonpartisan	1,460	65.44%	Joe Marchese	Non.	771	34.56%	2,231	689

=== Wisconsin Assembly (2012–2020) ===
Year	Election	Date	Elected				Defeated				Total	Plurality
2012	Primary	Aug. 14	Rob Hutton	Republican	5,351	57.59%	Thomas J. Schellinger	Rep.	2,968	31.94%	9,292	2,383
2012	Primary	Aug. 14	Rob Hutton	Republican	5,351	57.59%	Nate Ristow	Rep.	955	10.28%	9,292	2,383
2012	General	Nov. 6	Rob Hutton	Republican	20,367	60.49%	John Pokrandt	Dem.	13,258	39.38%	33,669	7,109
2014	General	Nov. 4	Rob Hutton (inc)	Republican	20,710	96.85%	--unopposed--				21,384	20,036
2016	General	Nov. 8	Rob Hutton (inc)	Republican	23,904	96.99%	--unopposed--				24,645	23,163
2018	General	Nov. 6	Rob Hutton (inc)	Republican	16,617	51.41%	Dennis Raymond McBride	Dem.	15,662	48.45%	32,323	955
2020	General	Nov. 3	Sara Rodriguez	Democratic	19,318	50.93%	Rob Hutton (inc)	Rep.	18,583	49.00%	37,928	735

=== Wisconsin Senate (2022) ===
Year	Election	Date	Elected				Defeated				Total	Plurality
2022	General	Nov. 8	Rob Hutton	Republican	49,025	53.24%	Jessica Katzenmeyer	Dem.	42,962	46.66%	92,084	6,063

Wisconsin State Assembly
Preceded by David Cullen	Member of the Wisconsin State Assembly from the 13th district January 7, 2013 – January 4, 2021	Succeeded by Sara Rodriguez
Wisconsin Senate
Preceded by Dale Kooyenga	Member of the Wisconsin Senate from the 5th district January 3, 2023 – present	Incumbent
