= Webster Park (Milwaukee) =

Park in Wisconsin, United States

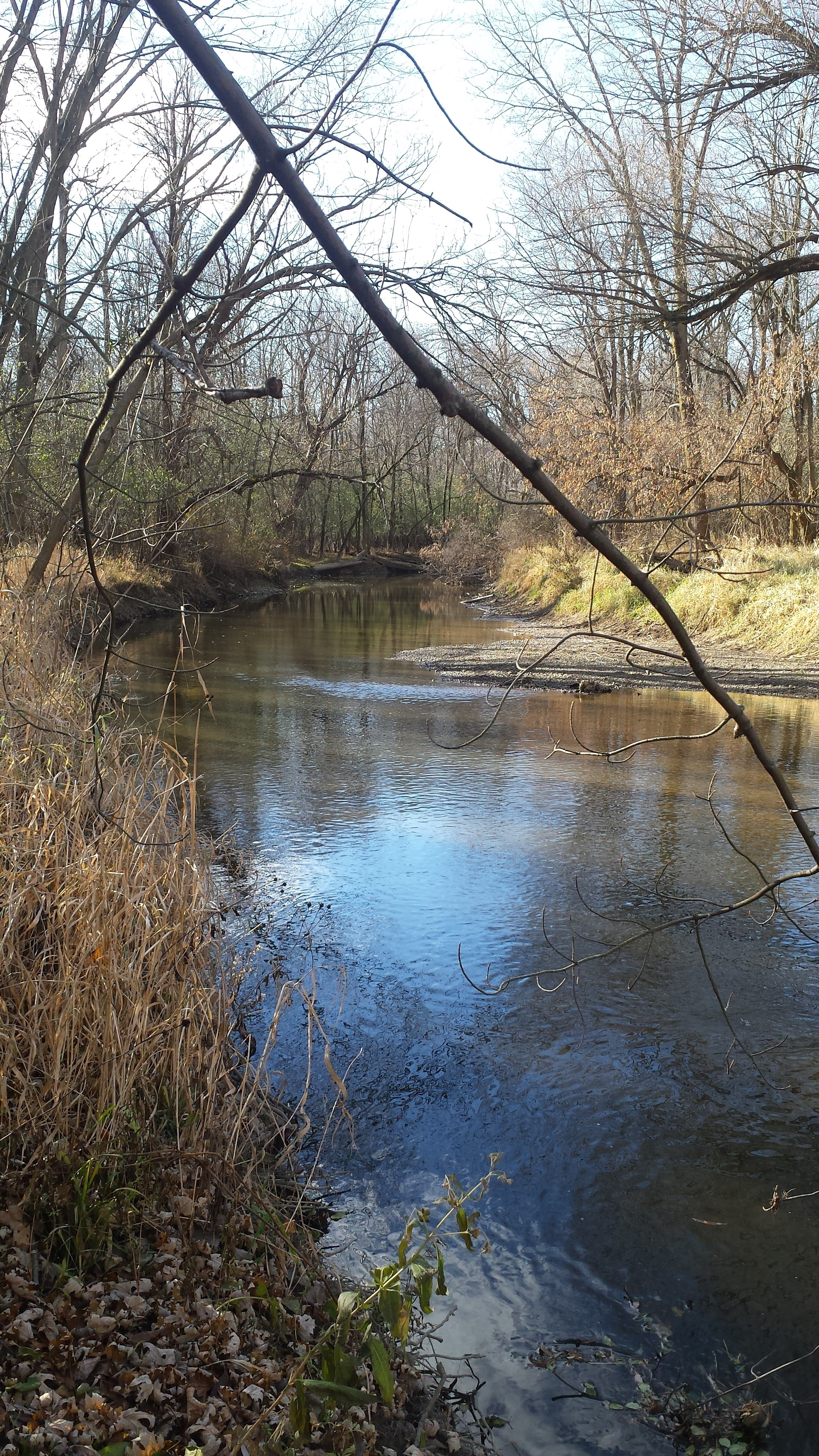
- Menomonee River
- Interactive map of Webster Park
- Location: Wauwatosa, Wisconsin
- Coordinates: 43.100690°N 88.053661°W
- Area: 4.5 acres (1.8 ha)
- Operator: Milwaukee County Parks Department

Webster Park is a public park in Wauwatosa, Wisconsin. It is owned by Milwaukee County and leased to the city of Wauwatosa.

== Description ==
Webster Park is a 4.5 acre park that is also a part of the Oak Leaf Trail. The Menomonee River runs through the park, starting from Hampton Avenue to Capitol Drive. Webster Park has a paved trail used for biking, jogging, walking, and skating. There is an off-road mountain biking trail across the river for hikers and mountain bikers. Webster Park has a playground, a soccer field, and open space for various activities for the public.

== Species ==
Animal species include: white-tail deer, beaver, mourning doves, and mallards. Plant species include Purple coneflower.

== Gallery ==
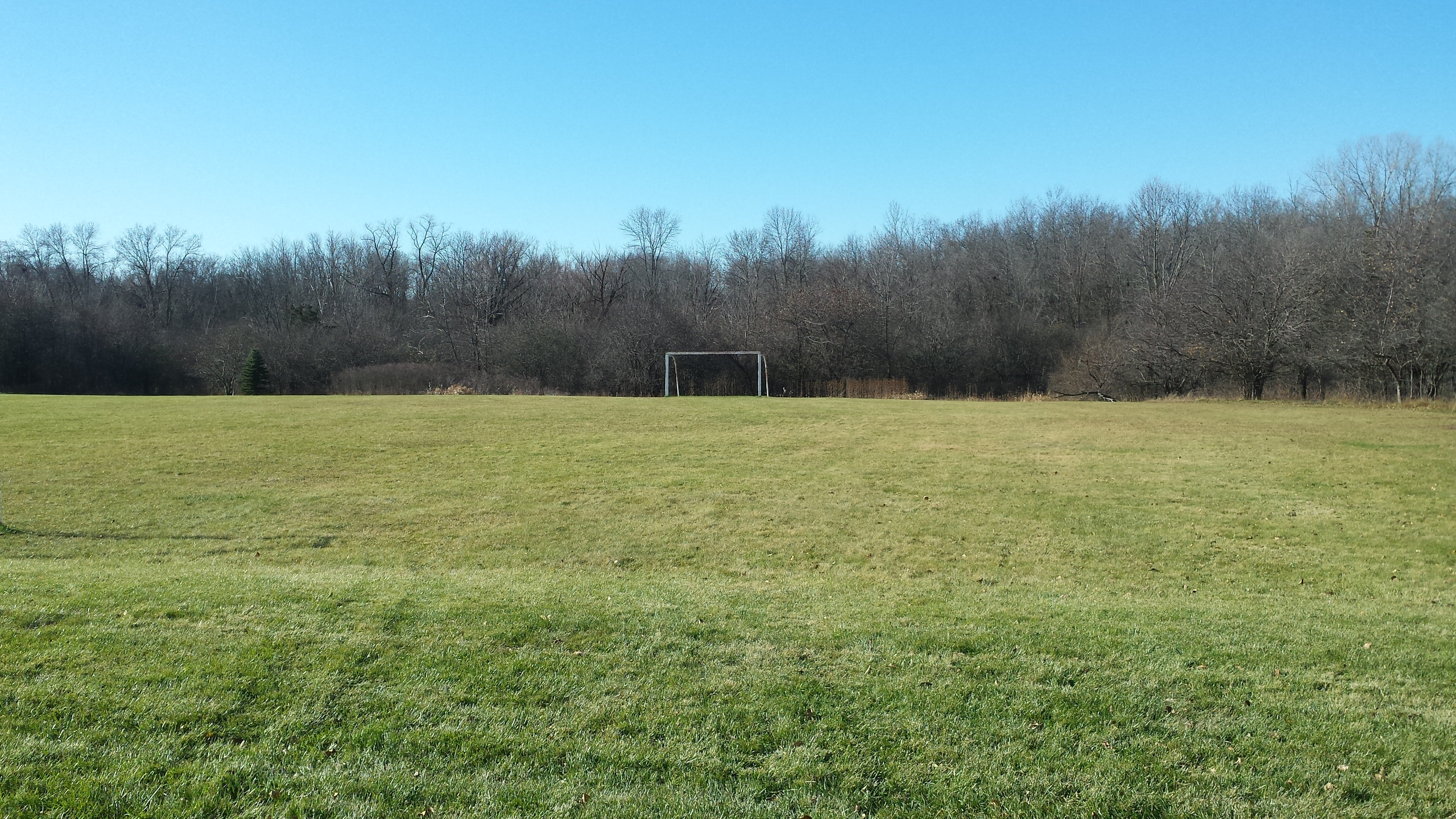
Soccer field

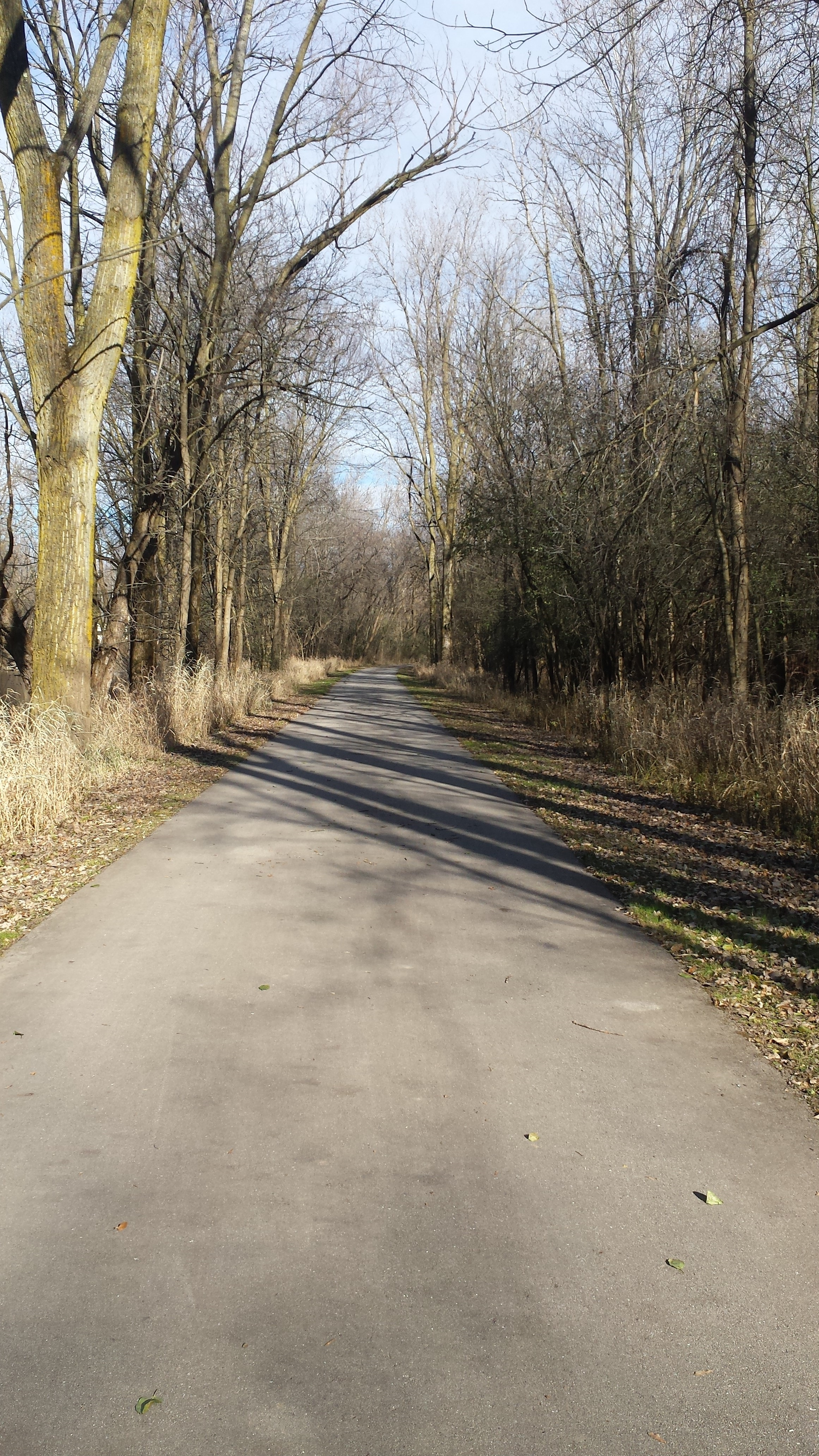
Oak Leaf Trail
