= Leo Richard Hamilton =

American politician (1927-2010)

Member of the Wisconsin State Assembly
- Constituency: 67th district
- Incumbent
- Assumed office 1986

Personal details
- Born: December 13, 1927
- Died: December 26, 2010
- Party: Democrat

Leo Richard Hamilton (December 13, 1927 – December 26, 2010) was a member of the Wisconsin State Assembly.

== Biography ==
Hamilton was born on December 13, 1927, in Saint Paul, Minnesota. He graduated from St. Thomas Military Academy and the University of Notre Dame. During the Korean War, he served in the United States Army.

On March 3, 1951, Hamilton married Irene Fliehr in Chippewa Falls, Wisconsin. They had four children. Hamilton died on December 26, 2010.

== Political career ==
Hamilton was mayor of Chippewa Falls from 1981 to 1987. In 1986, he was elected to the Assembly and served three terms. He was a Democrat.
