= David R. Hopkins =

American politician (1938–2017)

Member of the Wisconsin State Assembly from the 67th district
- In office January 1, 1979 – January 3, 1983
- Preceded by: Steven C. Brist
- Succeeded by: Peggy Rosenzweig

Personal details
- Born: May 24, 1938 Belmont, Massachusetts, U.S.
- Died: December 16, 2017 (aged 79) St. Augustine, Florida
- Party: Republican
- Spouse: Gloria Ann Burris (m. 1962–2017)
- Children: 3
- Education: University of Massachusetts (B.S.)

David R. Hopkins (May 24, 1938 – December 16, 2017) was an American engineer, businessman, and Republican politician. He served two years in the Wisconsin State Assembly, representing Chippewa County.

== Biography ==
Born in Belmont, Massachusetts, Hopkins graduated from Belmont High School and went on to the University of Massachusetts, where he earned his bachelor's degree in chemical engineering. His work as an engineer brought him to Wisconsin, where he was employed first at Johnson Plastics Machinery, and then co-founded Extrusion Dies, Inc.

He became involved with the Republican Party of Wisconsin and was an officer in The Conservative Caucus. In 1978, he ran what was considered to be a longshot campaign for Wisconsin State Assembly, challenging incumbent Democrat Steven C. Brist. He won a narrow 317 vote victory in the general election, taking 51% of the vote. He went on to win reelection in 1980, but was defeated in a rematch with Brist in 1982, after the implementation of a court-ordered redistricting plan.

Shortly after the 1982 election, he relocated to Florida with his family and founded Complex, Inc., in St. Augustine, Florida. He remained there for the rest of his life.

== Personal life and family ==
Hopkins married Gloria Ann Burris in 1962. They had three children together.

David R. Hopkins died in St. Augustine in December 2017.

== Electoral history ==
=== Wisconsin Assembly, 67th district (1978, 1980) ===
Wisconsin Assembly, 67th District Election, 1978
Party	Candidate	Votes	%	±%
General Election, November 7, 1978
Republican	David R. Hopkins	6,335	51.28%	+21.29%
Democratic	Steven C. Brist (incumbent)	6,018	48.72%	
Plurality		317	2.57%	-37.44%
Total votes		12,353	100.0%	-29.91%
Republican gain from Democratic		Swing	42.57%	

Wisconsin Assembly, 67th District Election, 1980
Party	Candidate	Votes	%	±%
General Election, November 4, 1980
Republican	David R. Hopkins (incumbent)	11,716	59.44%	+8.16%
Democratic	Howard L. Olson	7,995	40.56%	
Plurality		3,721	18.88%	+16.31%
Total votes		19,711	100.0%	+59.56%
Republican hold				

=== Wisconsin Assembly, 55th district (1982) ===
Wisconsin Assembly, 55th District Election, 1982
Party	Candidate	Votes	%	±%
General Election, November 2, 1982
Democratic	Steven C. Brist	7,365	51.96%	
Republican	David R. Hopkins	6,809	48.04%	
Plurality		556	3.92%	
Total votes		14,174	100.0%	-6.51%
Democratic gain from Republican				

Wisconsin State Assembly
Preceded by Steven C. Brist	Member of the Wisconsin State Assembly from the 67th district January 1, 1979 – January 3, 1983	Succeeded by Peggy Rosenzweig
