= David Hopkins (cricketer) =

English cricketer

Personal information
- Full name: David Charles Hopkins
- Born: 11 February 1957 (age 69); Birmingham, Warwickshire, England
- Batting: Right-handed
- Bowling: Right-arm medium

Domestic team information
- Years: Team
- 1982: Buckinghamshire
- 1977–1981: Warwickshire

Career statistics
Competition	First-class	List A
Matches	36	24
Runs scored	332	60
Batting average	10.37	7.50
100s/50s	–/–	–/–
Top score	34*	35*
Balls bowled	4,038	1,024
Wickets	53	22
Bowling average	38.13	32.36
5 wickets in innings	1	–
10 wickets in match	–	–
Best bowling	6/67	3/26
Catches/stumpings	8/–	3/–
- Source: Cricinfo, 13 July 2011

David Charles Hopkins (born 11 February 1957) is a former English cricketer. Hopkins was a right-handed batsman who bowled right-arm medium pace. He was born in Birmingham, Warwickshire.

Hopkins made his first-class debut for Warwickshire against Somerset in the 1977 County Championship. He made 35 further first-class appearances, the last of which came against Yorkshire in the 1981 County Championship. In his 36 first-class matches, he scored 332 runs at an average of 10.37, with a high score of 34 not out. With the ball, he took 53 wickets at a bowling average of 38.13, with best figures of 6/67. These figures, his only five wicket haul in first-class cricket, came against Somerset in the 1979 County Championship, a season in which he took 27 wickets at an average of 32.81, which was his most successful season in first-class cricket. He made his List A debut for Warwickshire against Leicestershire in the 1978 John Player League. He made 23 further List A appearances, the last of which came against Devon in the 1980 Gillette Cup. In his 24 List A appearances, he scored 60 runs at an average of 7.50, with a high score of 35 not out. With the ball, he took 22 wickets at an average of 32.36, with best figures of 3/26.

Leaving Warwickshire at the end of the 1981 season he joined Buckinghamshire, making 2 appearances for the county in the 1982 Minor Counties Championship, both against Oxfordshire.
