= Michael G. Kirby =

American politician (born 1952)

Member of the Wisconsin State Assembly from the 13th district
- In office January 6, 1975 – January 3, 1983
- Preceded by: David Berger
- Succeeded by: Dismas Becker

Personal details
- Born: Michael G. Kirby; April 2, 1952 (age 74) Milwaukee, Wisconsin
- Party: Democratic
- Education: University of Wisconsin-Oshkosh

Michael G. Kirby (born April 2, 1952) is a former member of the Wisconsin State Assembly.

== Biography ==
Kirby was born on April 2, 1952, in Milwaukee, Wisconsin. After graduating from Wauwatosa West High School in Wauwatosa, Wisconsin, Kirby attended the University of Wisconsin-Oshkosh.

== Career ==
Kirby was elected to the Assembly in 1974. He is a Democrat.
