= David C. Hopkins =

- Born: David Charles Hopkins; 25 November 1952
- Education: Doctor of Philosophy, Master of Arts, Bachelor of Science
- Alma mater: Vanderbilt University
- Occupation: Exegete, archaeologist
- Employer: University of Bristol; Wesley Theological Seminary

David Charles Hopkins (1952) is a researcher of ancient history and near eastern archaeology, and a professor in the Religion department of Archaeology, and Biblical Interpretation at Wesley Theological Seminary, Washington D. C. Hopkins is editor of Near Eastern Archaeology.

== Life ==
David Hopkins was born on November 25, 1952. He was raised in northern New Jersey, where he become a member of Community Church of Mountain Lakes (United Church of Christ).

=== Education ===
Hopkins earned a B.S. at Trinity College (Hartford). He obtained his M.A. at Vanderbilt University. Hopkins holds his Ph.D. obtained at Vanderbilt University with his thesis Agricultural subsistence in the early Iron Age highlands of Canaan.

=== Teaching ===
Hopkins was a teacher at Lancaster Theological Seminary for six years. He began working as an associate professor, and later as a professor at Wesley Theological Seminary for eighteen years.

== Works ==
=== Thesis ===
- Hopkins, David Charles (1984). Agricultural subsistence in the early Iron Age highlands of Canaan (Dissertation: Ph.D. Vanderbilt University). OCLC 12952706.

=== Books ===
- Hopkins, David C. (2002). Across the Anatolian plateau : readings in the archaeology of ancient Turkey. Annual of the American Schools of Oriental Research. Vol. 57. Boston, MA : American Schools of Oriental Research. ISBN 9780897570534. OCLC 70773943.
- Hopkins, David C. (1985). The Highlands of Canaan: agricultural life in the early Iron Age. Social world of biblical antiquity series. Vol. 3. Sheffield, England; Decatur, GA, U.S.A.: Almond. ISBN 9780907459392. OCLC 12554126.

=== Articles ===
- Hopkins, David C. (1987). "Life on the Land: The Subsistence Struggles of Early Israel". The Biblical Archaeologist. 50 (3): 178–191. doi:10.2307/3210060. JSTOR 3210060. S2CID 135049641.
- Hopkins, David C. (1993). "Pastoralists in Late Bronze Age Palestine: Which Way Did They Go?". Near Eastern Archaeology. 56 (4): 200–211. doi:10.2307/3210373. JSTOR 3210373. S2CID 163709318.
