= West Allis Speedskating Club =

- Abbreviation: WASSC
- Formation: 1930
- Type: Nonprofit organization

The West Allis Speedskating Club (WASSC) was a short track speed skating club located in West Allis, Wisconsin. Founded in 1930, it was a nonprofit organization that ran and as part of the West Allis/West Milwaukee Department of Recreation. The club trained on the Pettit National Ice Center, at the State Fair grounds, which houses a 400-meter (1,300 ft) indoor speed skating oval and two Olympic-size ice rinks.

Members of the club, both novice and advanced, competed in short track speed skating competitions in various parts of the United States, such as the Great Lakes region.

For over 70 years, the WASSC developed top US speedskaters claiming over 17 Olympians, more than 50 World Team members and over 95 National Champions.

WASSC merged with the Badger Speedskating Club to become the Wisconsin Speed Skating Club.

== List of Olympians ==
Names
Nick Pearson
Dan Jansen
Chris Witty
Cory Carpenter
Kip Carpenter
Becky Sanfelippo
Chris Scheels
Catherine Raney
Darcie Dohnal
Julie Goskowicz
Tony Goskowicz
Kirsten Holum
Alyson Dudek
Angela Zuckerman
Jordan Stolz
