= Wisconsin's 88th Assembly district =

American legislative district in Brown County, Wisconsin

Wisconsin's 88th State Assembly district
- 2024 map defined in 2023 Wisc. Act 94; 2022 map defined in Johnson v. Wisconsin Elections Commission; 2011 map was defined in 2011 Wisc. Act 43
Assemblymember
Ben Franklin; R–De Pere
since January 6, 2025 (1 years)
- Demographics: 84.87% White; 3.45% Black; 15.9% Hispanic; 2.98% Asian; 2.36% Native American; 0.13% Hawaiian/Pacific Islander
- Population (2020) • Voting age: 59,855; 47,127
- Website: Official website
- Notes: Green Bay metro area

The 88th Assembly district of Wisconsin is one of 99 districts in the Wisconsin State Assembly. Located in Northeastern Wisconsin, the district comprises parts of central Brown County. It includes the city of De Pere, the villages of Allouez and Bellevue, and a small part of the city of Green Bay. The district also contains landmarks such as St. Norbert College and the De Pere Lock and Dam Historic District. The district is represented by Ben Franklin, since January 2025.

The 88th Assembly district is located within Wisconsin's 30th Senate district, along with the 89th and 90th Assembly districts.

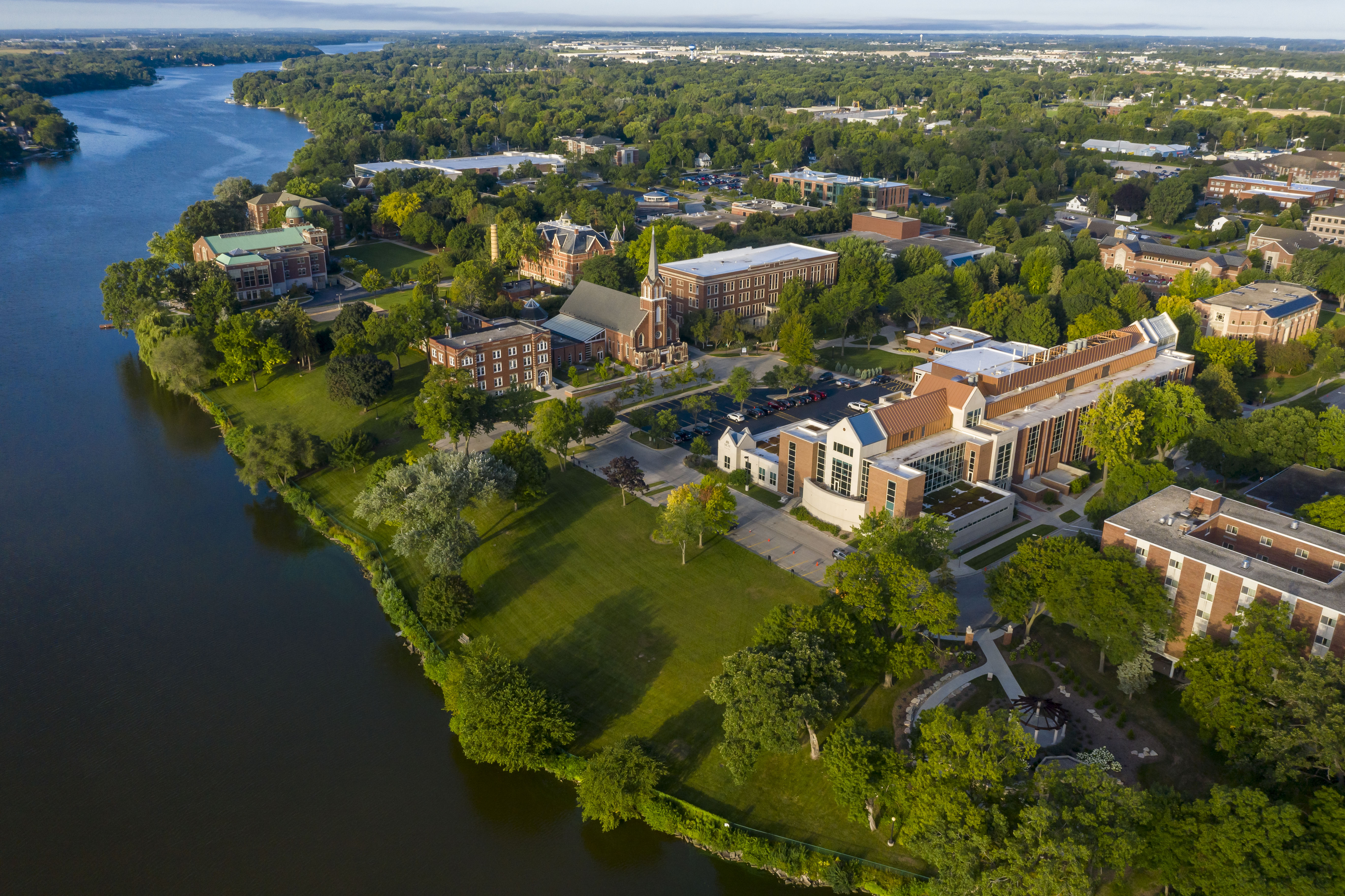
St. Norbert College

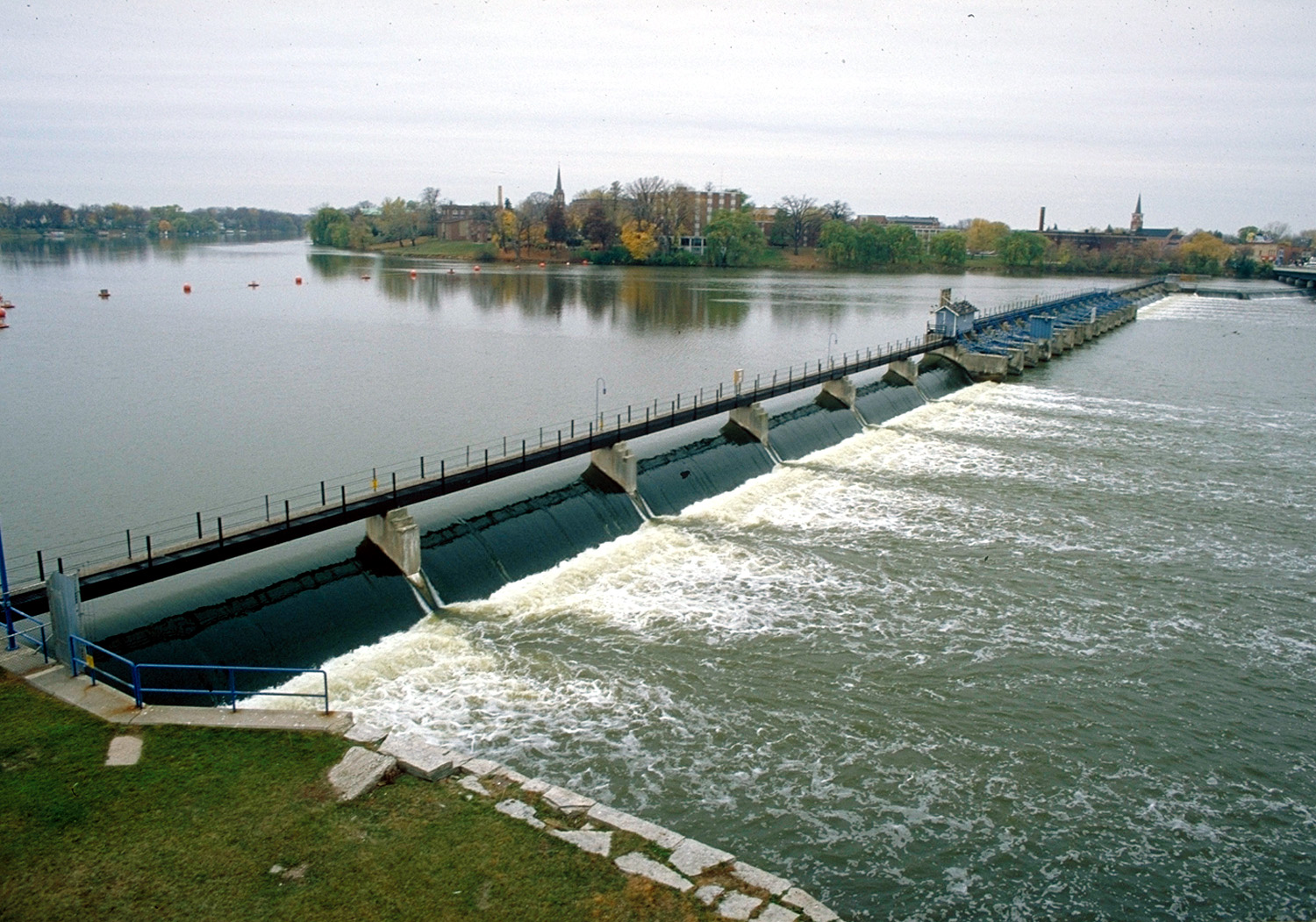
De Pere Dam on the Fox River

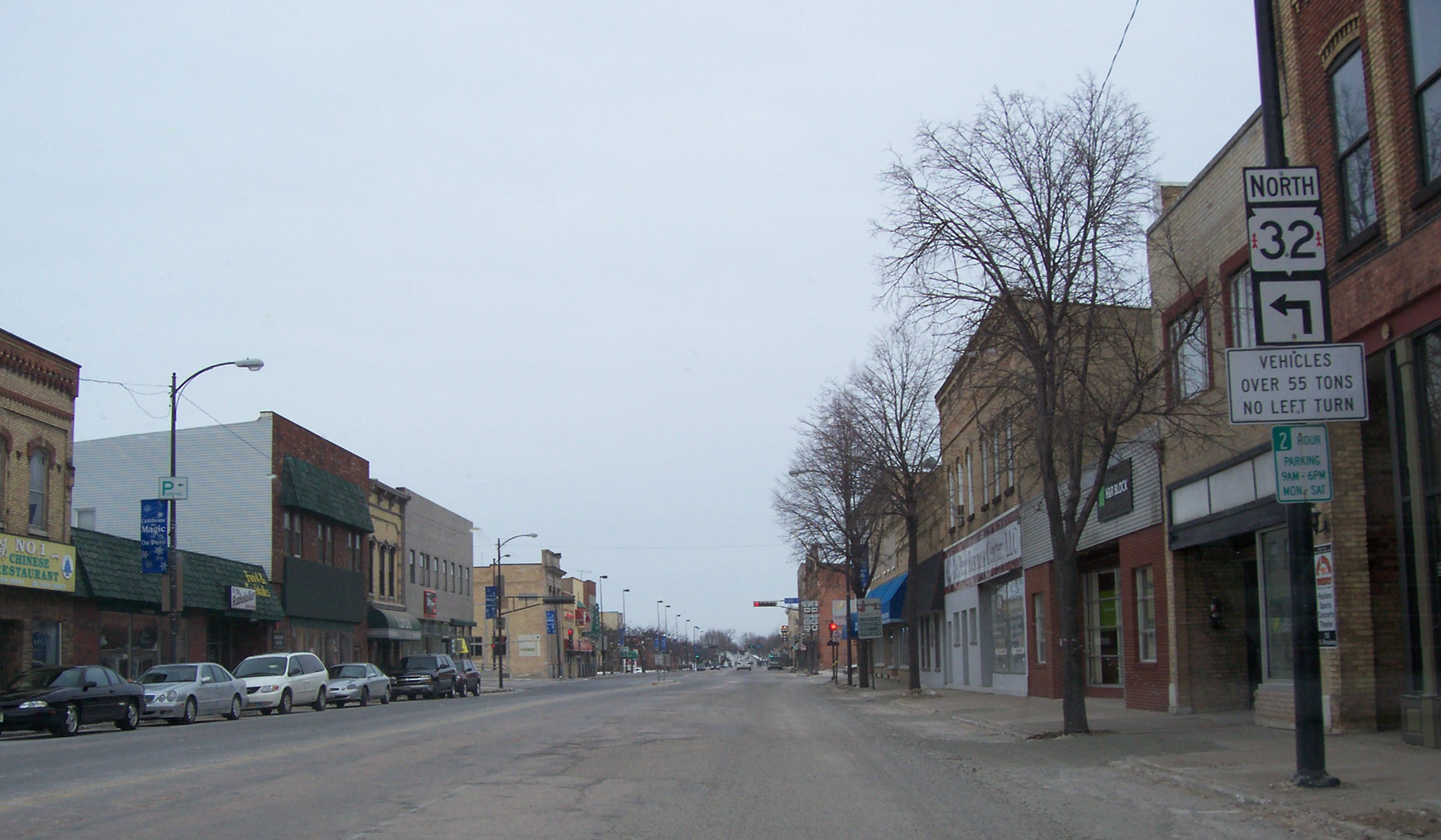
Downtown De Pere

== History ==
The district was created in the 1972 redistricting act (1971 Wisc. Act 304) which first established the numbered district system, replacing the previous system which allocated districts to specific counties. Under the 1972 plan, the 88th district did not closely resemble any of the districts under the previous maps, it comprised parts of eastern Marinette and Oconto counties.

Under the 1982 court-ordered redistricting plan, the district was briefly moved to east-central Wisconsin, comprising much of southern Winnebago County and central Fond du Lac County. The 1983 redistricting reverted the 88th district back to its prior location, but added parts of Shawano County. The 1992 court-ordered redistricting plan moved the 88th district into the east side of the city of Green Bay, with the 89th district taking over much of what had been the 88th district. The district remained in that area with only slight boundary changes in the 2002 redistricting. The 2011 redistricting plan (2011 Wisc. Act 43) removed most of central Green Bay from the district in order to pack Democratic votes into the 90th district. The 88th district shifted into the neighboring village of Bellevue, the towns of Ledgeview and Glenmore, and part of the city of De Pere. The 2022 court-ordered redistricting mostly preserved this configuration, giving the district a mostly rural character.

The 2024 redistricting (2023 Wisc. Act 94) moved the 88th district closer into the Green Bay metro area, adding all of the city of De Pere, all the territory of the villages of Allouez and Bellevue, and part of the city of Green Bay, itself. Rural towns were mostly removed from the district. Under the new map configuration, the 88th Assembly district is projected to be one of the most competitive districts in the state legislature.

== List of past representatives ==
List of representatives to the Wisconsin State Assembly from the 88th district
Member	Party	Residence	Counties represented	Term start	Term end	Ref.
District created
Richard P. Matty	Rep.	Stephenson	Marinette, Oconto	January 1, 1973	January 3, 1983	
Esther Doughty Luckhardt	Rep.	Horicon	Dodge, Fond du Lac, Washington	January 3, 1983	January 7, 1985	
Richard P. Matty	Rep.	Stephenson	Marinette, Oconto, Shawano	January 7, 1985	August 4, 1987	
--Vacant--			Marinette, Oconto, Shawano	August 4, 1987	October 12, 1987	
John Gard	Rep.	Peshtigo	Marinette, Oconto, Shawano	October 12, 1987	January 4, 1993	
Rosemary Hinkfuss	Dem.	Green Bay	Brown	January 4, 1993	January 2, 1995	
Carol Kelso	Rep.	Green Bay	Brown	January 2, 1995	January 1, 2001	
Judy Krawczyk	Rep.	Green Bay	Brown	January 1, 2001	January 3, 2007	
James Soletski	Dem.	Green Bay	Brown	January 3, 2007	January 3, 2011	
John Klenke	Rep.	Green Bay	Brown	January 3, 2011	January 5, 2015	
John Macco	Rep.	Ledgeview	Brown	January 5, 2015	January 6, 2025	
Ben Franklin	Rep.	De Pere	Brown	January 6, 2025	Current	

== Electoral history ==
Year	Date	Elected				Defeated				Total	Plurality	Other primary candidates
1972	Nov. 7	Richard P. Matty	Republican	10,720	59.19%	Robert La Count	Dem.	7,390	40.81%	18,110	3,330	John E. Blackowiak (Dem.); Robert LaCount (Dem.); Stanley J. Leja (Dem.); James R. Hertwig (Rep.)
1974	Nov. 5	Richard P. Matty (inc)	Republican	9,769	67.70%	James G. O'Donahue	Dem.	4,661	32.30%	14,430	5,108	
1976	Nov. 2	Richard P. Matty (inc.)	Republican	14,344	70.60%	Carl E. Krog	Dem.	5,974	29.40%	20,318	8,370	
1978	Nov. 7	Richard P. Matty (inc.)	Republican	10,876	69.11%	Joseph Donovan Jr.	Dem.	4,861	30.89%	15,737	6,015	
1980	Nov. 4	Richard P. Matty (inc.)	Republican	15,891	73.14%	Gene L. Oatman	Dem.	5,835	26.86%	21,726	10,056	
1982	Nov. 2	Esther Doughty Luckhardt	Republican	6,946	49.71%	Patricia Gruber Jerominski	Dem.	6,869	49.16%	13,973	77	
1982	Nov. 2	Esther Doughty Luckhardt	Republican	6,946	49.71%	Carol Neumann	Con.	6,869	49.16%	13,973	77	
1984	Nov. 6	Richard P. Matty	Republican	11,791	58.18%	Douglas T. Oitzinger	Dem.	8,475	41.82%	20,266	3,316	
1986	Nov. 4	Richard P. Matty (inc)	Republican	10,827	100.0%					10,827	10,827	Richard C. Johnson (Rep.)
1987	Oct. 6	John Gard	Republican	5,037	51.59%	Charles J. Boyle	Dem.	4,726	48.41%	9,763	311	Jason L. Maloney (Dem.); Tim A. Duket (Rep.); Walter C. Hitt (Rep.); Richard C. Johnson (Rep.); Danny J. Kanack (Rep.); Corliss A. Lightner (Rep.); Harold A. Pierce (Rep.)
1988	Nov. 8	John Gard (inc)	Republican	11,624	59.71%	Gary Potasnik	Dem.	7,843	40.29%	19,467	3,781	
1990	Nov. 6	John Gard (inc)	Republican	6,991	50.16%	Scott A. McCormick	Dem.	6,946	49.84%	13,937	45	
1992	Nov. 3	Rosemary Hinkfuss	Democratic	12,246	58.38%	Robert J. Loy	Rep.	8,731	41.62%	20,977	3,515	
1994	Nov. 8	Carol Kelso	Republican	8,223	56.39%	Rosemary Hinkfuss (inc)	Dem.	6,360	43.61%	14,583	1,863	Robert L. Menner (Rep.)
1996	Nov. 5	Carol Kelso (inc)	Republican	11,067	100.0%					11,067	11,067	
1998	Nov. 3	Carol Kelso (inc)	Republican	8,783	56.93%	Lori Nelson	Dem.	6,646	43.07%	15,429	2,137	
2000	Nov. 7	Judy Krawczyk	Republican	11,078	50.32%	Steve Peggs	Dem.	10,898	49.50%	22,015	180	Jack Krueger (Dem.); Michael Bina (Rep.)
2002	Nov. 5	Judy Krawczyk (inc)	Republican	8,157	60.41%	Bryan Milz	Dem.	4,794	35.50%	13,503	3,363	
2002	Nov. 5	Judy Krawczyk (inc)	Republican	8,157	60.41%	Dan Senglaub	Lib.	541	4.01%	13,503	3,363	
2004	Nov. 2	Judy Krawczyk (inc)	Republican	13,174	54.24%	Dan Aude	Dem.	11,093	45.67%	24,290	2,081	
2006	Nov. 7	James Soletski	Democratic	8,927	50.15%	Judy Krawczyk (inc)	Rep.	8,851	49.72%	17,800	76	Dan Aude (Dem.)
2008	Nov. 4	James Soletski (inc)	Democratic	13,155	55.86%	Tony Theisen	Rep.	10,368	44.03%	23,548	2,787	
2010	Nov. 2	John Klenke	Republican	8,224	50.74%	James Soletski (inc)	Dem.	7,957	49.09%	16,209	267	
2012	Nov. 6	John Klenke (inc)	Republican	14,445	52.40%	Ward Bacon	Dem.	13,085	47.47%	27,566	1,360	
2014	Nov. 4	John Macco	Republican	12,915	56.20%	Dan Robinson	Dem.	10,046	43.72%	22,980	2,869	
2016	Nov. 8	John Macco (inc)	Republican	17,742	60.99%	Noah Reif	Dem.	11,312	38.88%	29,091	6,430	
2018	Nov. 6	John Macco (inc)	Republican	14,628	53.31%	Tom Sieber	Dem.	12,793	46.62%	27,440	1,835	
2020	Nov. 3	John Macco (inc)	Republican	17,214	52.31%	Kristin Lyerly	Dem.	15,673	47.63%	32,906	1,541	
2022	Nov. 8	John Macco (inc)	Republican	14,451	58.14%	Hannah Beauchamp-Pope	Dem.	10,384	41.78%	24,854	4,067	
2024	Nov. 5	Benjamin Franklin	Republican	17,008	50.29%	Christy Welch	Dem.	16,788	49.64%	33,818	220	Phil Collins
