= John Gard =

American politician (born 1963)

75th Speaker of the Wisconsin Assembly
- In office January 6, 2003 – January 3, 2007
- Preceded by: Scott Jensen
- Succeeded by: Michael Huebsch

Member of the Wisconsin State Assembly
- In office January 4, 1993 – January 3, 2007
- Preceded by: Cletus J. Vanderperren
- Succeeded by: John Nygren
- Constituency: 89th district
- In office October 12, 1987 – January 4, 1993
- Preceded by: Richard P. Matty
- Succeeded by: Rosemary Hinkfuss
- Constituency: 88th district

Personal details
- Born: August 3, 1963 (age 63) Milwaukee, Wisconsin
- Party: Republican
- Spouse: Cathy Zeuske (m. 1990)
- Children: 2
- Education: University of Wisconsin–La Crosse (BA)

John G. Gard (born August 3, 1963) is an American lobbyist and former politician. A Republican, he was the 75th Speaker of the Wisconsin State Assembly (2003–2007) and was a member of the Assembly for 19 years. Gard also ran unsuccessfully for United States House of Representatives in Wisconsin's 8th congressional district in 2006 and 2008, losing both elections to Democrat Steve Kagen.

Gard is married to Cathy Zeuske, a former state treasurer of Wisconsin and former secretary of the Wisconsin Department of Revenue.

== Early life and career ==
Gard was born in Milwaukee, but was raised on his family's dairy farm in rural Lena, Wisconsin. He graduated from Lena High School and went on to earn his bachelor's degree in political science from University of Wisconsin–La Crosse in 1986. Gard went to work as a legislative assistant to State Representative David Prosser Jr.

== Political career ==
Just a year after going to work for Prosser, at age 23, Gard made his first attempt at elected office in a 1987 special election called to replace Richard P. Matty, who was being appointed to the administration of Governor Tommy Thompson. He ran his campaign out of his parents' farm, assisted by the volunteer efforts of his parents and seven siblings. In September, Gard prevailed in a crowded seven-person Republican primary, which included Marinette County district attorney Tim Duket and Marinette Mayor Harold Pierce. During the 1987 campaign, Gard declared his opposition to pending legislation which would mandate seat belt use. In the October special election, he narrowly defeated Democrat Charles J. Boyle.

Gard was sworn in on October 12, 1987, at Lena High School. The location was intended to accommodate his ailing grandfather, who could not travel to Madison. Gard's grandfather died, however, on the morning of the swearing-in ceremony. At the time of his swearing-in, Gard was the youngest member of the Wisconsin Legislature.

In 1990, Gard faced his closest election, surviving by a margin of just 45 votes after a recount. Following the 1990 election, state redistricting removed Gard from the 88th district and placed him in the 89th district. After redistricting, Gard easily won a rematch with his 1990 opponent, Scott McCormick, and subsequently won reelection to six more terms representing the 89th Assembly district.

Following the indictment of Scott Jensen in Fall 2002, the Assembly Republican caucus elected Gard the next Speaker of the Wisconsin State Assembly. He served as speaker for the 96th and 97th Wisconsin Legislatures.

=== 2006 Congressional race ===
In 2006, Wisconsin Congressman Mark Green announced he would run for Governor of Wisconsin, creating a vacancy in the 8th congressional district. Gard chose to forego reelection to the Assembly enter the race to replace Green in the United States House of Representatives. In the September primary, he defeated State Representative Terri McCormick with nearly 70% of the vote.

In the general election, Gard faced Democrat Steve Kagen, a medical doctor from Appleton, in what became the most expensive congressional race in Wisconsin history up to that point. The district was considered a slightly Republican-leaning toss-up by pollsters and ratings organizations like The Cook Political Report. The 2006 elections were driven by national issues like the Iraq War, healthcare, immigration, and earmark spending, and resulted in a Democratic wave, repudiating four years of Republican control of Washington, D.C. Gard was able to carry his home county of Marinette with 51.4% of the vote and neighboring Oconto County, where he grew up, by 52.1%. He lost Brown County, home to Green Bay, by less than 1,000 votes (less than 1%). Kagen carried his home county of Outagamie with 54.5% of the vote. The cumulative result was a narrow victory for Kagen, taking 50.9% of the general election vote.

=== 2008 Congressional race ===
John Gard announced on Sunday April 27, 2008, that he would again run against Democratic incumbent Steve Kagen for 8th district representative. The Cook Political Report claimed the race 'leans Democrat' even though the district was considered to "lean-Republican" with a Cook Partisan Voting Index (PVI) of R +4.

Other GOP potential candidates dropped out of the race, including State Assemblymen Frank Lasee and Steve Wieckert, and former Green Bay Mayor Paul Jadin. Gard received the Republican nomination, but lost the election by a count of 164,561 to 193,261.

== Later years ==
Since leaving office, Gard has operated as a lobbyist to the state government. He and his wife co-own the Gard Business Group, through which they provide their lobbying services. Among other clients, Gard has lobbied on behalf of Amazon.com and Google in the 2017, 2019, and 2021 sessions of the Wisconsin Legislature.

In the 2010 Wisconsin gubernatorial election, Gard supported former Representative Mark Neumann, serving as a co-chair of his campaign.

Gard was also influential on behalf of Mike Gallagher in the 2016 Republican primary for the 8th congressional district. Gard was an outspoken surrogate for Gallagher and worked to raise funds for his campaign; he described Gallagher as a close family friend and likened him to a "young Paul Ryan."

In 2020, in an emotional op-ed, Gard inserted himself into the debate over athletes kneeling as a form of silent protest against racism. Recalling the debate over state funding for Lambeau Field renovations in 2000, Gard asserted that the Green Bay Packers were disrespecting their community and ruining the franchise for fans like him.

== Personal life and family ==
Gard is one of 8 children born to Herbert and Dixie Gard. In 1990, he married fellow state representative Cathy Zeuske. Zeuske was also elected to the Assembly in her early 20s and would later go on to serve as the 31st State Treasurer of Wisconsin and 9th Secretary of the Wisconsin Department of Revenue. They have two adult children and reside in Suamico, Wisconsin.

== Electoral history ==
=== Wisconsin Assembly, 88th district (1987–1990) ===
Year	Election	Date	Elected				Defeated				Total	Plurality
1987 (special)	Primary	Sep. 9	John G. Gard	Republican	1,560	34.23%	Tim A. Duket	Rep.	968	21.24%	4,557	592
1987 (special)	Primary	Sep. 9	John G. Gard	Republican	1,560	34.23%	Harold A. Pierce	Rep.	690	15.14%	4,557	592
1987 (special)	Primary	Sep. 9	John G. Gard	Republican	1,560	34.23%	Danny J. Kanack	Rep.	483	10.60%	4,557	592
1987 (special)	Primary	Sep. 9	John G. Gard	Republican	1,560	34.23%	Corliss A. Lightner	Rep.	375	8.23%	4,557	592
1987 (special)	Primary	Sep. 9	John G. Gard	Republican	1,560	34.23%	Walter C. Hitt	Rep.	366	8.03%	4,557	592
1987 (special)	Primary	Sep. 9	John G. Gard	Republican	1,560	34.23%	Richard C. Johnson	Rep.	115	2.52%	4,557	592
1987 (special)	Special	Oct. 6	John G. Gard	Republican	5,037	51.59%	Charles J. Boyle	Dem.	4,726	48.41%	9,763	311
1988	General	Nov. 8	John G. Gard (inc.)	Republican	11,624	59.71%	Gary Potasnik	Dem.	7,843	40.29%	19,467	3,781
1990	General	Nov. 6	John G. Gard (inc.)	Republican	6,991	50.16%	Scott A. McCormick	Dem.	6,946	49.84%	13,937	45

=== Wisconsin Assembly, 89th district (1992–2004) ===
Year	Election	Date	Elected				Defeated				Total	Plurality
1992	General	Nov. 3	John G. Gard	Republican	14,826	64.02%	Scott A. McCormick	Dem.	8,331	35.98%	23,157	6,495
1994	General	Nov. 8	John G. Gard (inc.)	Republican	10,325	68.53%	Kim Fenske	Dem.	4,742	31.47%	15,067	5,583
1996	General	Nov. 5	John G. Gard (inc.)	Republican	14,113	66.67%	Kim Fenske	Dem.	7,056	33.33%	21,169	7,057
1998	General	Nov. 3	John G. Gard (inc.)	Republican	13,088	97.96%	Alan S. Hager (write-in)	Dem.	272	2.04%	13,360	12,816
2000	General	Nov. 7	John G. Gard (inc.)	Republican	18,372	72.65%	Alan S. Hager	Dem.	6,904	27.30%	25,290	11,468
2002	General	Nov. 5	John G. Gard (inc.)	Republican	11,335	69.06%	Alan S. Hager	Dem.	4,501	27.42%	16,414	6,834
2002	General	Nov. 5	John G. Gard (inc.)	Republican	11,335	69.06%	Justin Ingalls	Lib.	308	1.88%	16,414	6,834
2002	General	Nov. 5	John G. Gard (inc.)	Republican	11,335	69.06%	Jake Neta	Ind.	257	1.57%	16,414	6,834
2004	General	Nov. 2	John G. Gard (inc.)	Republican	18,216	63.81%	Bruce J. Berman	Dem.	10,318	36.15%	28,546	7,898

=== U.S. House of Representatives (2006) ===
Wisconsin's 8th Congressional District Election, 2006
Party	Candidate	Votes	%	±%
Republican Primary, September 12, 2006
Republican	John G. Gard	39,451	68.15%	
Republican	Terri McCormick	18,424	31.83%	
	Scattering	12	0.02%	
Plurality		21,027	36.32%	
Total votes		57,887	100.0%	
General Election, November 7, 2006
Democratic	Steve Kagen	141,570	50.90%	+21.07%
Republican	John G. Gard	135,622	48.76%	−21.37%
	Scattering	943	0.34%	
Plurality		5,948	2.14%	-38.16%
Total votes		278,135	100.0%	-21.37%
Democratic gain from Republican		Swing	42.44%	

=== U.S. House of Representatives (2008) ===
Wisconsin's 8th Congressional District Election, 2008
Party	Candidate	Votes	%	±%
General Election, November 4, 2008
Democratic	Steve Kagen (incumbent)	193,662	54.00%	+3.10%
Republican	John G. Gard	164,621	45.90%	−2.86%
	Scattering	364	0.10%	
Plurality		29,041	8.10%	+5.96%
Total votes		358,647	100.0%	+28.95%
Democratic hold				

Wisconsin State Assembly
Preceded by Richard P. Matty	Member of the Wisconsin State Assembly from the 88th district October 12, 1987 – January 4, 1993	Succeeded by Rosemary Hinkfuss
Preceded by Cletus J. Vanderperren	Member of the Wisconsin State Assembly from the 89th district January 4, 1993 – January 3, 2007	Succeeded by John Nygren
Preceded by Scott Jensen	Speaker of the Wisconsin State Assembly; January 6, 2003 – January 3, 2007	Succeeded by Michael Huebsch
