= Wisconsin Department of Revenue =

Wisconsin State Agency charged with administering state tax laws

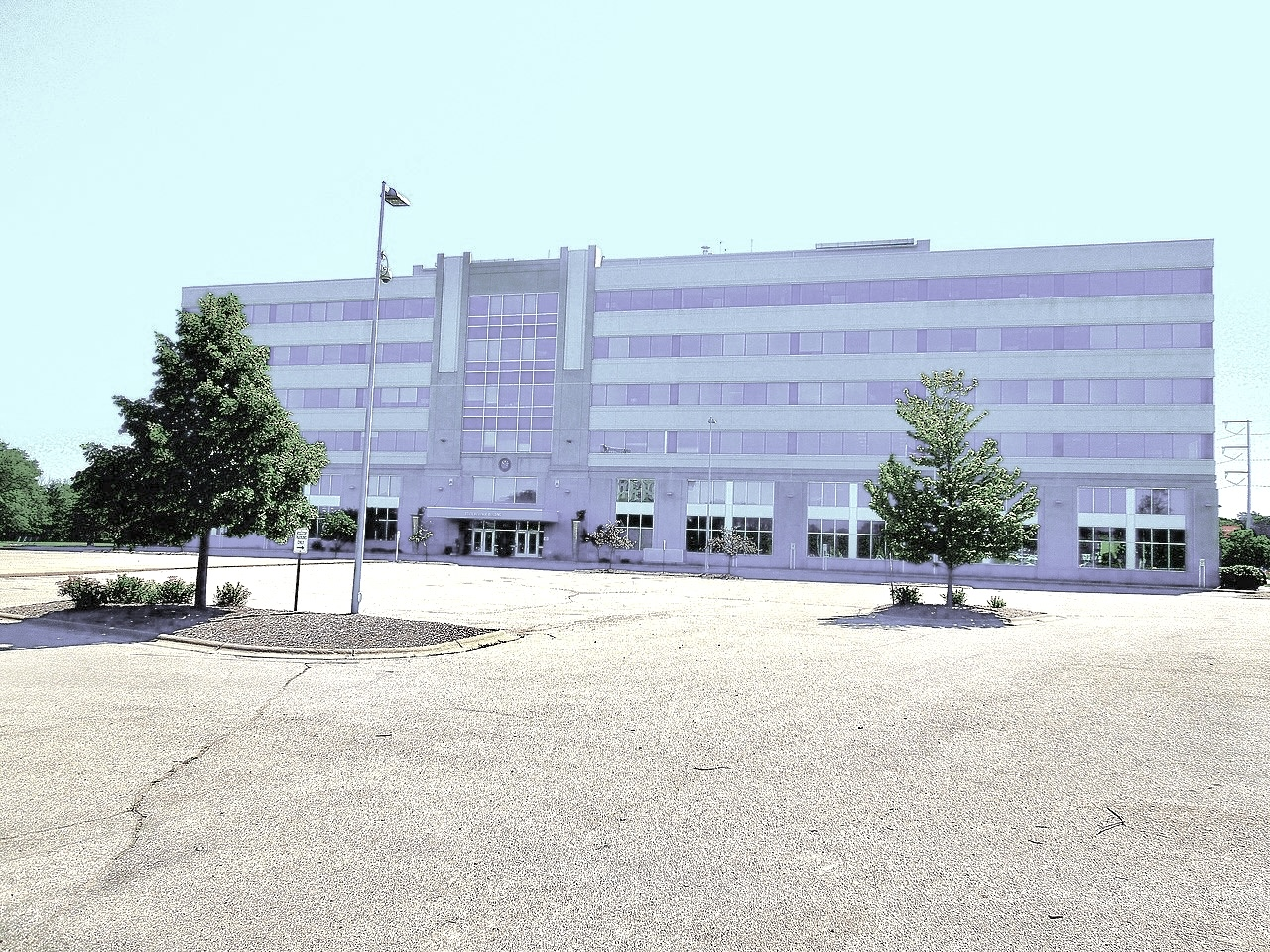
- State Revenue Building

Agency overview
- Formed: August 1, 1967; 59 years ago
- Preceding agencies: Wisconsin Department of Taxation (1939–1967); Wisconsin Tax Commission (1897–1939)
- Headquarters: State Revenue Building; 2135 Rimrock Rd. Madison, Wisconsin, U.S. 43°2′34.836″N 89°22′32.412″W
- Employees: 1,178 (2023)
- Annual budget: $476,631,000 (2023)
- Agency executives: David Casey, secretary; Maria Guerra Lapacek, deputy secretary; Patty Mayers, assistant deputy secretary
- Website: Agency website

The Wisconsin Department of Revenue (DOR) is an agency of the Wisconsin state government responsible for the administration of all tax laws, as well as valuing property and overseeing the wholesale distribution of alcoholic beverages and enforcement of liquor laws. The department also administers the state's unclaimed property program and the state lottery.

The department headquarters are located at the State Revenue Building in south central Madison, Wisconsin. The current secretary of the Wisconsin Department of Revenue is David Casey. He was appointed by Governor Tony Evers in April 2024.

== History ==
In the late 19th century, as the economy was shifting, Wisconsin's farmers began to raise concerns that the property-based tax system placed a disproportionate burden on them while many newer industries and corporations were able to escape taxation by hiding their property in other financial instruments. Milwaukee attorney Kossuth Kent Kennan, then a tax attorney working for the Wisconsin Central Railroad, was the first to draft and propose a state tax commission to investigate and propose reforms to the taxation system. Kennan convinced a legislator to introduce his proposal in the 1889 session of the Legislature, but it was not enacted. Kennan continued his efforts for several more years, and, in 1897, when the last hurdle to passage was the Legislature's reluctance to appropriate $6,000 for the project, Kennan pledged to raise the money himself to fund his commission. The bill passed as 1897 Wisconsin Act 340.

The first Wisconsin Tax Commission was a short-term study of existing tax policy. Kennan, along with former congressman Burr W. Jones and attorney George Curtis, Jr., were charged with producing a report by the end of 1898. The report laid out the inequities of the current system, substantiating the concerns of the farmers that other non-tangible forms of property were being taxed at a substantial discount, and that the entire system suffered from inconsistent valuation and irregular assessment. They suggested that, in addition to reforms to tax law, the state required a new system of tax administration by trained, objective, non-elected state officials.

The legislature responded to their report and the Tax Commission was reauthorized for another ten years, with a mandate to investigate and supervise the state taxation system (1899 Wisconsin Act 206). Under the new Progressive Republican governor Robert M. La Follette, who came into office two years later, the commission's mandate was considerably expanded to give them power over tax equalization in the state, and additional powers to enjoin local tax officials. Finally, in 1905, the Tax Commission was made a permanent entity of state government, with three commissioners each appointed to eight-year terms.

In 1939, a major reorganization under Governor Julius P. Heil converted the previous three-member Tax Commission into a Department of Taxation headed by a single commissioner, while creating the separate entity known as the Wisconsin Tax Appeals Commission, now attached to the Wisconsin Department of Administration.

The Department of Revenue was created in 1967 from the previous Department of Taxation as part of the state government reorganization plan proposed by the "Kellett Commission," named for chairman William R. Kellett.

== Organization ==
=== Leadership ===
The senior leadership of the department consists of the secretary, deputy secretary, and assistant deputy secretary, along with the administrators heading up the divisions of the department.

- Secretary: David Casey
- Deputy secretary: Maria Guerra Lapacek
- Assistant deputy secretary: Janet Piraino
- State and local finance: Valeah Foy
- Income, sales and excise Tax: Susan Dukes
- Research and policy: Cari Redington
- Enterprise services: Julie Raes
- Lottery: Cindy Polzin
- Technology services: Richard Offenbecher

=== Divisions ===
==== Office of the secretary ====
Subdivisions include:

- Office of general counsel
- Legislative advisor
- Communications advisor

==== State and local finance ====
The Division of State and Local Finance (SLF) is responsible for establishing the state's equalized values for property tax purposes. They assess commercial, manufacturing, telecommunication, airport, railroad, and other special property, and provide financial management, training, and certification for municipal and county governments on administration of the state property tax policies. In addition, they administer state shared revenue and property tax relief payments to local governments.

Subdivisions include:

- Equalization Bureau
- Local Government Services Bureau
- Manufacturing & Utility Bureau
- Office of Technical & Assessment Services

==== Income, sales and excise tax ====
The Division of Income, Sales and Excise Tax (IS&E) administers individual income, employee withholding, corporate franchise/income, state and county sales/use, estate, excise, recycling, and other state tax programs. It also administers various state tax credits, including the homestead, farmland preservation, earned income tax credits. The division works to promote voluntary tax compliance and to identify and address noncompliance, and to promote fairness and equity in the administration of state tax law.

Subdivisions include:

- Administration
  - Office of Technical Services
  - Office of Criminal Investigation
- Audit Bureau
- Compliance Bureau
- Customer Service Bureau
- Tax Operations Bureau

==== Research and policy ====
The Research and Policy Division (R&P) provides analyses and reports of state fiscal and economic policies for the Secretary of Revenue, the Executive Office, and other state officials. They provide assessments of current and proposed tax and revenue laws, and prepare revenue estimates for the development of the state budget.

Subdivisions include:

- Income Tax Policy Team
- Economic Team
- Sales and Property Tax Policy Team

==== Enterprise services ====
The Division of Enterprise Services provides the department with a wide range of support services, including administrative support, budget and financial management, business planning and performance measurement, printing, records management, personnel, affirmative action, employee development, employment relations, and management improvement studies.

Subdivisions include:

- Budget and Business Services Bureau
- Financial Management Services Bureau
- Human Resource Services Bureau

==== Lottery ====
The Division of Wisconsin Lottery is charged with the security and administration of the state lottery and related regulations.

Subdivisions include:

- Security & Operations Bureau
- Product Development & Marketing Bureau
- Retailer Relations & Sales Bureau
- Lottery Offices and Prize Redemption Centers

==== Technology services ====
The Division of Technology Services provides technology services for the Department, including data collection and management, applications development and support, server and network support, workstation setup and support, and technology planning. The division also manages information and technology standards, policies, and guidelines for the department to ensure information security and good stewardship of electronic resources.

Subdivisions include:

- Customer Service Bureau
- Application Services Bureau

=== Statutory commissions ===
Separate from the ordinary organizational structure of the Department, there are a number of specific commissions created by acts of the Wisconsin Legislature to oversee, advise, or administer certain functions.

- State Board of Assessors
- Farmland Advisory Council
- Investment and Local Impact Fund Board

== Secretaries and commissioners ==
=== Commissioners (1897–1939) ===
Commissioner	Took office	Left office	Appointing governor	Notes
Burr W. Jones	1897	1898	Edward Scofield	
K. K. Kennan	1897	1898	Edward Scofield	
George Curtis, Jr.	1897	1898	Edward Scofield	
Michael Griffin	1899	1899	Edward Scofield	Chairman (1899); Died in office
George Curtis, Jr.	1899	1911	Edward Scofield	
Norman S. Gilson	1899	1911	Edward Scofield	Chairman (1900-1911)
William J. Anderson	1900	1901	Edward Scofield	
Nils P. Haugen	1901	1921	Robert M. La Follette	Chairman (1911-1921)
Thomas E. Lyons	1911	1925	Francis E. McGovern	Chairman (1921-1925)
Thomas S. Adams	1911	1915	Francis E. McGovern	
Carroll D. Atwood	1915	1926	Emanuel L. Philipp	Chairman (1925-1926); Died in office
Charles D. Rosa	1921	1935	John J. Blaine (1921); Fred R. Zimmerman (1927)	Chairman (1926-1930)
William J. Conway	1925	1939	John J. Blaine (1925)	Chairman (1932-1939)
William J. Conway	1925	1939	Albert G. Schmedeman (1933)	Chairman (1932-1939)
A. W. Kimball	1927	1929	Fred R. Zimmerman	
Edward L. Kelley	1929	1932	Walter J. Kohler, Sr.	Chairman (1930-1932)
Alvin M. Johnson	1933	1937	Albert G. Schmedeman	
Herbert L. Mount	1937	1939	Philip La Follette	
Henry A. Gunderson	1937	1939	Philip La Follette	

=== Commissioners (1939–1967) ===
Commissioner	Took office	Left office	Governor
Elmer E. Barlow	1939	1943	Julius P. Heil
Arthur E. Wegner	1943	1951	Walter Samuel Goodland
Arthur E. Wegner	1943	1951	Oscar Rennebohm
Harry W. Harder	1951	1953	Walter J. Kohler, Jr.
Arthur E. Wegner	1953	1955	Walter J. Kohler, Jr.
Harry W. Harder	1955	1959	Walter J. Kohler, Jr.
Harry W. Harder	1955	1959	Vernon Wallace Thomson
John A. Gronouski	1960	1963	Gaylord Nelson
George W. Corning	1963	1965	John W. Reynolds Jr.
James R. Morgan	1965	1967	Warren P. Knowles

=== Secretaries (1967–present) ===
Secretary	Took office	Left office	Governor
James R. Morgan	1967	1971	Warren P. Knowles
Edward A. Wiegner	1971	1974	Patrick Lucey
David W. Adamany	1974	1977	Patrick Lucey
Dennis J. Conta	1977	1979	Martin J. Schreiber
Mark E. Musolf	1979	1983	Lee S. Dreyfus
Michael Ley	1983	1987	Tony Earl
Karen A. Case	1987	1988	Tommy Thompson
Mark D. Bugher	1988	1996	Tommy Thompson
Cathy S. Zeuske	1996	2001	Tommy Thompson
Richard G. Chandler	2001	2003	Scott McCallum
Michael L. Morgan	2003	2007	Jim Doyle
Roger M. Ervin	2007	2011	Jim Doyle
Richard G. Chandler	2011	2019	Scott Walker
Peter Barca	2019	2024	Tony Evers
David Casey	2024	Current	Tony Evers

== See also ==
- Wisconsin Lottery
- Alcohol laws of Wisconsin
