= William LaFave =

20th century American politician

William G. LaFave

Member of the Wisconsin State Assembly from the Florence–Marinette district
- In office January 6, 1969 – January 1, 1973
- Preceded by: Leslie R. Stevenson
- Succeeded by: District abolished

Personal details
- Born: September 29, 1929 Kingsford, Michigan, U.S.
- Died: October 20, 2016 (aged 87) Wisconsin
- Resting place: Allouez Catholic Cemetery, Green Bay, Wisconsin
- Party: Republican
- Spouse: Shirley Ann Germain (m. 1953; died 2009)
- Children: 10

Military service
- Allegiance: United States
- Branch/service: United States Navy; United States Navy Reserve

William Gerare LaFave (September 29, 1929 – October 20, 2016) was an American accountant, businessman, and Republican politician from Peshtigo, Wisconsin. He served two terms in the Wisconsin State Assembly, representing Marinette and Florence counties during the 1969 and 1971 legislative sessions.

== Biography ==
William LaFave was born September 29, 1929, in Kingsford, Michigan. He was raised and educated there, graduating from Kingsford High School in 1947. After high school, he enlisted in the United States Navy. After leaving active duty, he remained in the United States Navy Reserve for several years and went on to attend the Badger Green Bay Business College in Green Bay, Wisconsin. He was married in 1953 and briefly moved to Milwaukee, Wisconsin, after the wedding, where he was employed as an accountant.

He ultimately returned to Green Bay and changed careers in 1961, working for several years as a Wisconsin State Patrol officer, before moving further north to Marinette County, Wisconsin, where he worked for the local police department and later became a captain in the county traffic patrol department.

In 1968, incumbent Marinette County state representative Leslie R. Stevenson announced he would not run for re-election. LaFave faced two other Republican candidates in the primary, including Roy H. Sengstock, who had previously served five terms in the Assembly as a representative of Marinette County. LaFave managed to prevail with 43% of the vote, finishing 183 votes ahead of Sengstock, and easily won the November general election, receiving 64% of that vote. He went on to win re-election in 1970, facing opponents in both the primary and general elections. After the major redistricting act in 1971, LaFave's district was divided in half, with his area of eastern Marinette County incorporated into what became the 88th Assembly district. LaFave announced in March 1972 that he would not run for re-election in the new district, and he left office in January 1973.

After leaving office, he worked in real estate and taught police science at Northeast Wisconsin Technical College. In his later years he also became involved in several charitable and community service programs.

He died October 20, 2016.

== Personal life and family ==
William LaFave was one of four children born to William J. and Florence (née Beauchamp) LaFave.

William LaFave married Shirley Ann Germain on May 9, 1953, they met while he was attending business school in Green Bay. They had ten children together and were married for 56 years before her death in 2009. All ten children survived them, along with 32 grandchildren and 13 great-grandchildren.

== Electoral history ==
=== Wisconsin Assembly (1968, 1970) ===
Year	Election	Date	Elected				Defeated				Total	Plurality
1968	Primary	Sep. 10	William G. LaFave	Republican	2,318	42.77%	Roy H. Sengstock	Rep.	2,135	39.39%	5,420	183
1968	Primary	Sep. 10	William G. LaFave	Republican	2,318	42.77%	Irvin H. Peth	Rep.	967	17.84%	5,420	183
1968	General	Nov. 5	William G. LaFave	Republican	10,115	64.51%	Ralph Staudenmaier	Dem.	5,565	35.49%	15,680	4,550
1970	Primary	Sep. 8	William G. LaFave (inc)	Republican	3,740	57.31%	Richard P. Matty	Rep.	2,786	42.69%	6,526	954
1970	General	Nov. 3	William G. LaFave (inc)	Republican	8,406	62.83%	William H. Reines	Dem.	4,972	37.17%	13,378	3,434

Wisconsin State Assembly
Preceded by Leslie R. Stevenson	Member of the Wisconsin State Assembly from the Florence–Marinette district January 6, 1969 – January 1, 1973	District abolished
