= Richard P. Matty =

20th century American politician

Member of the Wisconsin State Assembly
- In office January 7, 1985 – August 4, 1987
- Preceded by: Esther Doughty Luckhardt
- Succeeded by: John Gard
- Constituency: 88th Assembly district
- In office January 3, 1983 – January 7, 1985
- Preceded by: Earl F. McEssy
- Succeeded by: Earl F. McEssy
- Constituency: 52nd Assembly district
- In office January 1, 1973 – January 3, 1983
- Preceded by: District established
- Succeeded by: Esther Doughty Luckhardt
- Constituency: 88th Assembly district

Coroner of Marinette County, Wisconsin
- In office June 15, 1966 – January 1, 1971
- Appointed by: Warren P. Knowles
- Preceded by: C. L. Blahnik
- Succeeded by: Roger Schmitt

Personal details
- Born: Richard Matykowski; September 16, 1932 Menominee, Michigan, U.S.
- Died: April 21, 2019 (aged 86) Rennes West Nursing Home, Peshtigo, Wisconsin, U.S.
- Resting place: Saint Marys Catholic Cemetery, Crivitz, Wisconsin
- Party: Republican
- Spouse: Sandra Borman (m. 1953–2019)
- Children: 8
- Occupation: Restaurant owner

Military service
- Allegiance: United States
- Branch/service: United States Army; United States Air Force
- Years of service: 1950–1954 (USAF)
- Battles/wars: Korean War

Richard P. Matty (born Richard Matykowski; September 16, 1932 – April 21, 2019) was an American restaurateur and Republican politician from Marinette County, Wisconsin. He served 14 years in the Wisconsin State Assembly, representing the 88th Assembly district from 1973 to 1987 (except the 1983 term). He left the Assembly to become administrator of tourism in the Wisconsin Department of Development, but resigned due to scandal in 1990. He subsequently worked for the Lac du Flambeau Band of Lake Superior Chippewa and as a spokesperson for the Lake of the Torches Casino. Earlier in his career, he served as coroner of Marinette County from 1966 through 1970.

== Early life ==
Richard Matty was born Richard Matykowski on September 16, 1932, in Menominee, Michigan. As a child he moved with his family to Crivitz, Wisconsin, where he graduated from Crivitz High School in 1950. After graduating from high school, he joined the United States Army, but shortly after transferred to the United States Air Force, where he served during the Korean War.

After leaving the Air Force, he returned to Crivitz and soon became the owner of a restaurant known as Matty's Steak House, which he operated for the next 25 years. Through business and veterans groups, he became active in the politics and was selected president of the Crivitz Recreation Association in the 1960s. In 1964, he launched a primary challenge against the incumbent Marinette County coroner, Dr. C. L. Blahnik, but lost the Republican primary. Blahnik, however, resigned before the end of his term. On June 15, 1966, Governor Warren P. Knowles appointed Matykowski to succeed Blahnik as coroner. By then, he had begun using the surname "Matty".

== Political career ==
Matty won election to a full two-year term as coroner in the fall of 1966 and was re-elected again in 1968.

In 1970, Matty launched a primary challenge against incumbent Republican state representative William LaFave, in what was then the Florence–Marinette district. LaFave prevailed in the Republican primary; Matty received 43% of the vote. During the next term, however, the legislature passed a major redistricting act. Under the new map, the old Florence–Marinette district was divided with eastern Marinette County joining eastern Oconto County in the 88th Assembly district. LaFave announced he would not run for re-election in the new district; Matty announced his candidacy in June 1972. In the Republican primary, Matty faced James R. Hertwig, a businessman from Oconto. This time Matty prevailed with 70% of the primary vote and went on to win the general election with 59%, defeating Democrat Robert La Count.

He won re-election seven times, serving until August 1987, when he resigned to accept an appointment to a role in the administration of new governor Tommy Thompson, a close personal friend of Matty. Matty was soon named administrator of the Division of Tourism Development in the Wisconsin Department of Development.

In 1990, Matty ran into a series of scandals in his role as head of tourism promotion. First, he was accused of sexual harassment by an employee, who also alleged that Matty had her run personal errands for him during work hours. Matty personally paid damages for the complaint and was ordered to take sensitivity training. Just a few months later, however, Matty was given a seven day suspension after accidentally placing a tourism ad in a pornographic Japanese magazine. At the time, Secretary of Development Robert Trunzo elaborated that the suspension was due to a "series of bad judgments". Trunzo also noted that the governor was "outraged". Democratic leaders also used the scandal to attack Thompson for appointing unqualified friends to important state jobs. Matty resigned the next day.

After the 1990 election, in which Thompson won a second term, Matty briefly returned to state government employment as a business liaison in the Wisconsin Department of Transportation, but was forced out again under pressure from the legislature.

== Later years ==
After leaving government again, Matty went to work as a spokesperson for the Lac du Flambeau Band of Lake Superior Chippewa, during their effort to start a casino. They were ultimately successful, and Matty became public relations director for the Lake of the Torches Casino, where he retired in 2002.

== Personal life and family ==
Matty was the youngest of ten children born to Paul and Veronica (née Wirkus) Matykowski. The Matykowskis were Polish Americans; his mother was an immigrant and his father was a first generation American.

He married Sandra Borman in Marinette, Wisconsin, in 1953. They had eight children together, though one died in infancy.

Matty died on April 21, 2019, at 86 years old, at Rennes West Nursing Home in Peshtigo, Wisconsin. He was interred at Saint Marys Catholic Cemetery in Crivitz.

Wisconsin State Assembly
District established	Member of the Wisconsin State Assembly from the 88th district January 1, 1973 – January 3, 1983	Succeeded by Esther Doughty Luckhardt
Preceded by Earl F. McEssy	Member of the Wisconsin State Assembly from the 52nd district January 3, 1983 – January 7, 1985	Succeeded by Earl F. McEssy
Preceded by Esther Doughty Luckhardt	Member of the Wisconsin State Assembly from the 88th district January 7, 1985 – August 4, 1987	Succeeded by John Gard
