= Ben Franklin (Wisconsin politician) =

American politician (born 1982)

Member of the Wisconsin State Assembly from the 88th district
- Incumbent
- Assumed office January 6, 2025
- Preceded by: John Macco

Personal details
- Born: October 16, 1982 (age 43) Carthage, Illinois, U.S.
- Party: Republican
- Spouse: Sharon
- Children: 2
- Education: Trident University International (B.A.)
- Website: Official website Campaign website

Military service
- Allegiance: United States
- Branch/service: United States Air Force; U.S. Army Reserve

Benjamin Franklin (born October 16, 1982) is an American small business owner and Republican politician from De Pere, Wisconsin. He is a member of the Wisconsin State Assembly, representing Wisconsin's 88th Assembly district since 2025.

== Early life and career ==
Franklin was born in Carthage, Illinois, on October 16, 1982. During his youth, his family moved to Keokuk, Iowa, where he attended Keokuk high school and volunteered for various community organizations such as Relay for Life, Bowl for Kids Sake, Big Brothers Big Sisters, and Boy Scouts of America, and attended his local church. After graduating high school in 2001, Franklin enlisted in the United States Air Force, and it was during his service that he met and married his wife Sharon.

While serving in the Air Force, Franklin also continued his education through Trident University International, and earned his bachelor's degree.

== Political career ==
Under the new state legislative maps, the 88th Assembly district was slightly modified, removing some rural areas of Brown county and adding in De Pere and Allouez. The new map also drew John Macco into an incumbent-incumbent matchup against fellow Republican legislator Shae Sortwell. Franklin announced he would run for State Assembly under the new maps. He faced one opponent in the Republican Primary, 2020 Prohibition nominee for president, Phil Collins, also from De Pere. During the campaign, Franklin's campaign sent out fliers claiming his opponent opposed the sale of beer and opposed former president Donald Trump. Under the new maps, the 88th was projected to be one of the most competitive in the state, and drew in significant amounts of funding and attention. During the general election campaign, Franklin signed a pledge to support Congressional Term Limits. He ultimately prevailed over his Democratic opponent, Christy Welch, chair of the Democratic Party of Brown County by 0.6%.

Franklin took office in January 2025. In February, he introduced legislation which would require 70% of school operational costs to go towards classroom spending. In September, Franklin supported legislation alongside senators André Jacque and Romaine Quinn which would provide $1.95 million dollars over the next biennium to support the Veterans Housing and Recovery Program operated by the Wisconsin Department of Veterans Affairs. Additionally, he authored legislation in October to create a state-administered grant program which would provide state grants to organizations that provided housing to homeless veterans. Another bill authored by Franklin would distribute $1.9 million for up to $25 per day for homeless veterans housing organizations in the state.

Throughout his first year in office, Franklin sponsored several bills relating to veterans issues, and in interviews described a belief that the issue should be apolitical. Franklin also serves as vice-chair of the Committee on Veterans and Military Affairs in the State Assembly.

== Awards and decorations ==
Franklin was awarded the Military Outstanding Volunteer Service Medal for his service in the Air Force.

== Personal life ==
Franklin lives in De Pere, Wisconsin, with his wife and two children.

== Electoral history ==
=== Wisconsin Assembly (2024) ===
Year	Election	Date	Elected				Defeated				Total	Plurality
2024	Primary	Aug. 13	Benjamin Franklin	Republican	4,608	67.62%	Phil Collins	Rep.	2,181	32.00%	6,815	2,427
2024	General	Nov. 5	Benjamin Franklin	Republican	17,008	50.29%	Christy Welch	Dem.	16,788	49.64%	33,818	220
