= John Macco =

21st century American politician

Member of the Wisconsin State Assembly from the 88th district
- In office January 5, 2015 – January 6, 2025
- Preceded by: John Klenke
- Succeeded by: Ben Franklin

Personal details
- Born: John Joseph Macco; September 23, 1958 (age 68) Green Bay, Wisconsin, U.S.
- Party: Republican
- Spouses: Suzan (m. 1979; died 2021) Lynn (m. 2023)
- Children: 2
- Website: Official website

John Joseph Macco (born September 23, 1958) is an American businessman and Republican politician from Brown County, Wisconsin. He was a member of the Wisconsin State Assembly, representing Wisconsin's 88th Assembly district from January 2015 until January 2025. Before his political career, he founded Macco's Floor Cover Centers and the Macco Financial Group.

== Early life and career ==
Macco was born in Green Bay, Wisconsin, and graduated from Green Bay Southwest High School. He helped found and served as president of Macco's Floor Cover Centers, a retail and commercial flooring company with six locations in Wisconsin. Subsequently, he founded and served as president of Macco Financial Group, a financial advisory firm serving 15 states.

== Political career ==
On November 4, 2014, Macco was elected to the Wisconsin State Assembly, defeating Democratic challenger Dan Robinson. Macco was reelected in the 2016 election, defeating challenger Noah Reif. He retained his seat by defeating Tom Sieber in the 2018 election. In the 2020 election, he defeated Kristin Lyerly.

In September 2021, Macco filed paperwork for a possible run for governor in the 2022 Wisconsin gubernatorial election. However, in November 2021, Macco indicated that he would not seek the Republican nomination, and that he would endorse Rebecca Kleefisch, who served as lieutenant governor from 2011 to 2019.

In October 2023, Macco attend a rally for the anti-LGBT organization, Gays Against Groomers, which had about a dozen attendees. Two other Republican Wisconsin state legislators, Joy Goeben and Nate Gustafson, also attended the rally.

== Personal life ==
Macco has two sons. Macco's first wife Suzan died from complications from breast cancer in April 2021. Macco remarried in 2023.

== Electoral history ==
Wisconsin State Assembly, District 88 Election, 2014
Party	Candidate	Votes	%	±%
General Election, November 4, 2014
Republican	John Macco	12,915	56.2%	
Democratic	Dan Robinson	10,046	43.72%	
	Scattering	19	0.08%	
Total votes		22,980	100.0%	

Wisconsin State Assembly, District 88 Election, 2016
Party	Candidate	Votes	%	±%
General Election, November 8, 2016
Republican	John Macco (incumbent)	17,742	60.99%	
Democratic	Noah Reif	11,312	38.88%	
	Scattering	37	0.13%	
Total votes		29,091	100.0%	

Wisconsin State Assembly, District 88 Election, 2018
Party	Candidate	Votes	%	±%
General Election, November 6, 2018
Republican	John Macco (incumbent)	14,628	53.31%	
Democratic	Tom Sieber	12,793	46.62%	
	Scattering	19	0.07%	
Total votes		27,440	100.0%	

Wisconsin State Assembly, District 88 Election, 2020
Party	Candidate	Votes	%	±%
General Election, November 3, 2020
Republican	John Macco (incumbent)	17,214	52.31%	
Democratic	Kristin Lyerly	15,673	47.63%	
	Scattering	19	0.06%	
Total votes		32,906	100.0%	

Wisconsin State Assembly, District 88 Election, 2022
Party	Candidate	Votes	%	±%
General Election, November 8, 2022
Republican	John Macco (incumbent)	14,451	58.14%	
Democratic	Hannah Beauchamp-Pope	10,384	41.78%	
	Scattering	19	0.08%	
Total votes		24,854	100.0%	

Wisconsin State Assembly
Preceded by John Klenke	Member of the Wisconsin State Assembly from the 88th district January 5, 2015 – January 6, 2025	Succeeded by Ben Franklin
