= Gordon Hintz =

21st century American politician (born 1973)

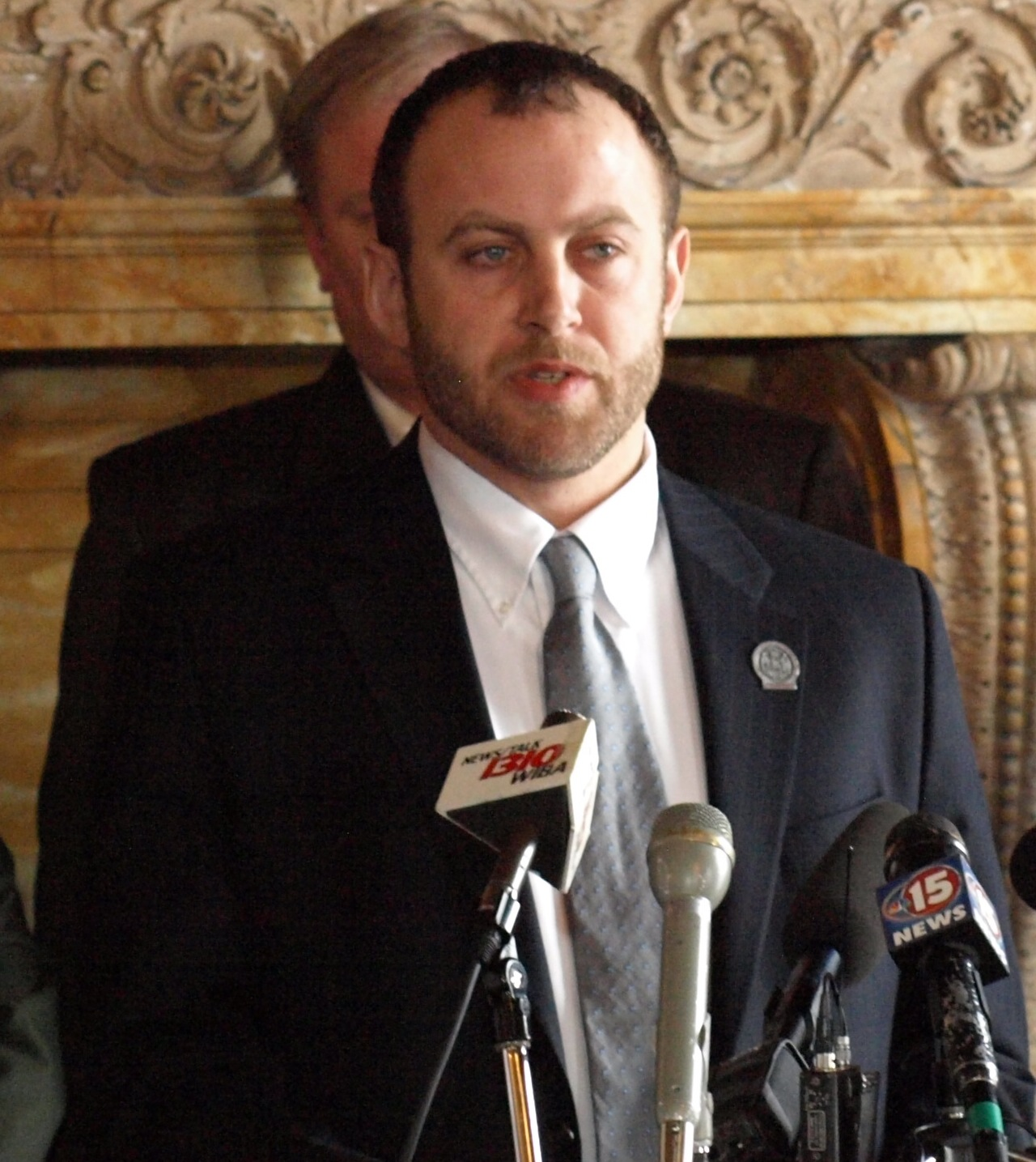

Executive of Winnebago County, Wisconsin
- Incumbent
- Assumed office April 15, 2025
- Preceded by: Jon Doemel

Minority Leader of the Wisconsin State Assembly
- In office October 1, 2017 – January 10, 2022
- Preceded by: Peter Barca
- Succeeded by: Greta Neubauer

Member of the Wisconsin State Assembly from the 54th district
- In office January 3, 2007 – January 3, 2023
- Preceded by: Gregg Underheim
- Succeeded by: Lori Palmeri

Personal details
- Born: November 29, 1973 (age 52) Oshkosh, Wisconsin, U.S.
- Party: Democratic
- Spouse: Elizabeth Lang (m. 2014)
- Children: 2
- Parent: Stephen Hintz (father)
- Education: Hamline University (BA); University of Wisconsin, Madison (MPA)

Gordon N. Hintz (born November 29, 1973) is an American public administrator and Democratic politician from Oshkosh, Wisconsin. He is the county executive of Winnebago County, Wisconsin, since April 2025. He previously represented the Oshkosh area for eight terms in the Wisconsin State Assembly (2007–2023), and was Assembly minority leader from 2017 through 2021.

His father, Stephen Hintz, was mayor of Oshkosh from 2002 to 2004.

== Early life and career ==
Hintz was born and raised in Oshkosh, Wisconsin, graduating from Oshkosh North High School in 1992. He obtained a B.A. from Hamline University, in Saint Paul, Minnesota, and went on to earn his Masters of Public Administration from the Robert M. La Follette School of Public Affairs at the University of Wisconsin–Madison.

Prior to serving in the Legislature, Hintz worked in government at the federal, state, and local levels. Hintz worked on the 1996 U.S. Senate campaign of Paul Wellstone before going to work for U.S. Senator Herb Kohl and former U.S. Representative Jay W. Johnson as a Legislative Staff Assistant in Washington, D.C. Hintz also served as a research assistant for Governor Tommy Thompson's Commission on State and Local Partnerships for the 21st Century (Kettl Commission) and worked as a management assistant and budget analyst for the City of Long Beach, California.

== Political career ==
Hintz first ran for the Wisconsin State Assembly in 2004, and lost. In 2006 Hintz made another attempt, this time winning the open seat.

In September 2017, after 10 years in the Assembly, Hintz was elected by the Democratic caucus to serve as their next floor leader, following Representative Peter Barca's announcement that he would stand down from the role.

On March 3, 2022, he announced that he would not seek re-election.

Hintz returned to politics in 2024 when he announced he would run for county executive of Winnebago County, Wisconsin, in the Spring 2025 election, challenging incumbent executive Jon Doemel. Winnebago County sheriff John Matz also entered the race. Doemel and Hintz advanced from the February nonpartisan primary. Hintz ultimately won the election with about 53% of the vote.

== Controversies ==
In the midst of the 2011 protests, on February 10, 2011, Hintz was found guilty of solicitation of prostitution. He was also ticketed by police for sexual misconduct at Heavenly Touch Massage Parlor in Appleton, Wisconsin. Police had been investigating the business because it was suspected of prostitution. Hintz pleaded no contest to sexual misconduct and paid a fine of $2,032, according to a news report in the Milwaukee Journal Sentinel. He said he made "a bad decision" that "was out of character" and apologized for disappointing his family, friends, and community. He also sought to refocus attention on the important issues then facing the state, saying "My concern right now is that my personal situation is distracting from the much more important issue facing our state. We have tens of thousands of working people at the Capitol every day, and that must remain our focus."

Hintz publicly berated a female colleague in 2011 and was forced to make an apology. He apologized on February 28, 2011, for comments directed at fellow legislator, Republican State Representative Michelle Litjens during a heated backroom debate, after Republicans allegedly broke procedural rules to end a 58-hour debate on the contentious Budget Repair Bill. Litjens said she did not take the comments personally and thought they were directed at all Republicans but thought he should be disciplined by the Assembly.

Hintz was involved in an expletive-laced Facebook exchange on May 28, 2019, with a former friend in both public and private messages that were later provided to the Milwaukee Journal Sentinel by the friend and made public. Hintz apologized, stating, "But I need to move on and let it go, and say I'm sorry today happened".

== Other ==
Hintz placed second in the 2003 National Air Guitar championships under the pseudonym, "Krye Tuff". He appears in the documentary Air Guitar Nation about the 2003 championships.

== Electoral history ==
Wisconsin Assembly, District 54 Election, 2004
Party	Candidate	Votes	%	±%
General Election, November 2, 2004
Republican	Gregg Underheim (incumbent)	14,045	46.94%	
Democratic	Gordon Hintz	12,028	40.20%	
Green	Tony Palmeri	2,653	8.87%	
Independent	Dan Carpenter	1,157	3.87%	
	Scattering	39	0.13%	
Plurality		2,017	6.74%	
Total votes		29,922	100.0%	
Republican hold				

Wisconsin Assembly, District 54 Election, 2006
Party	Candidate	Votes	%	±%
General Election, November 7, 2006
Democratic	Gordon Hintz	13,351	62.12%	+21.92%
Republican	Julie Pung Leschke	8,109	37.73%	−9.21%
	Scattering	34	0.16%	
Plurality		5,242	24.39%	
Total votes		21,494	100.0%	-28.17%
Democratic gain from Republican		Swing	31.13%	

Wisconsin State Assembly
Preceded by Gregg Underheim	Member of the Wisconsin State Assembly from the 54th district 2007–2023	Succeeded by Lori Palmeri
Preceded by Peter Barca	Minority Leader of the Wisconsin State Assembly; 2017–2022	Succeeded by Greta Neubauer
