= Wisconsin's 54th Assembly district =

American legislative district for Oshkosh, Wisconsin

Wisconsin's 54th State Assembly district
- 2024 map defined in 2023 Wisc. Act 94; 2022 map defined in Johnson v. Wisconsin Elections Commission; 2011 map was defined in 2011 Wisc. Act 43
Assemblymember
Lori Palmeri; D–Oshkosh
since January 3, 2023 (3 years)
- Demographics: 83.49% White; 5.87% Black; 3.74% Hispanic; 4.4% Asian; 2.13% Native American; 0.15% Hawaiian/Pacific Islander
- Population (2020) • Voting age: 59,296; 48,814
- Website: Official website
- Notes: Oshkosh, Wisconsin

The 54th Assembly district of the Wisconsin is one of 99 districts in the Wisconsin State Assembly. Located in east-central Wisconsin, the district comprises part of eastern Winnebago County, including most of the city of Oshkosh, Wisconsin. It also contains landmarks such as the University of Wisconsin–Oshkosh campus, the Oshkosh campus of the Fox Valley Technical College, and the Oshkosh Corporation headquarters. The district is represented by Democrat Lori Palmeri, since January 2023.

The 54th Assembly district is located within Wisconsin's 18th Senate district, along with the 52nd and 53rd Assembly districts.

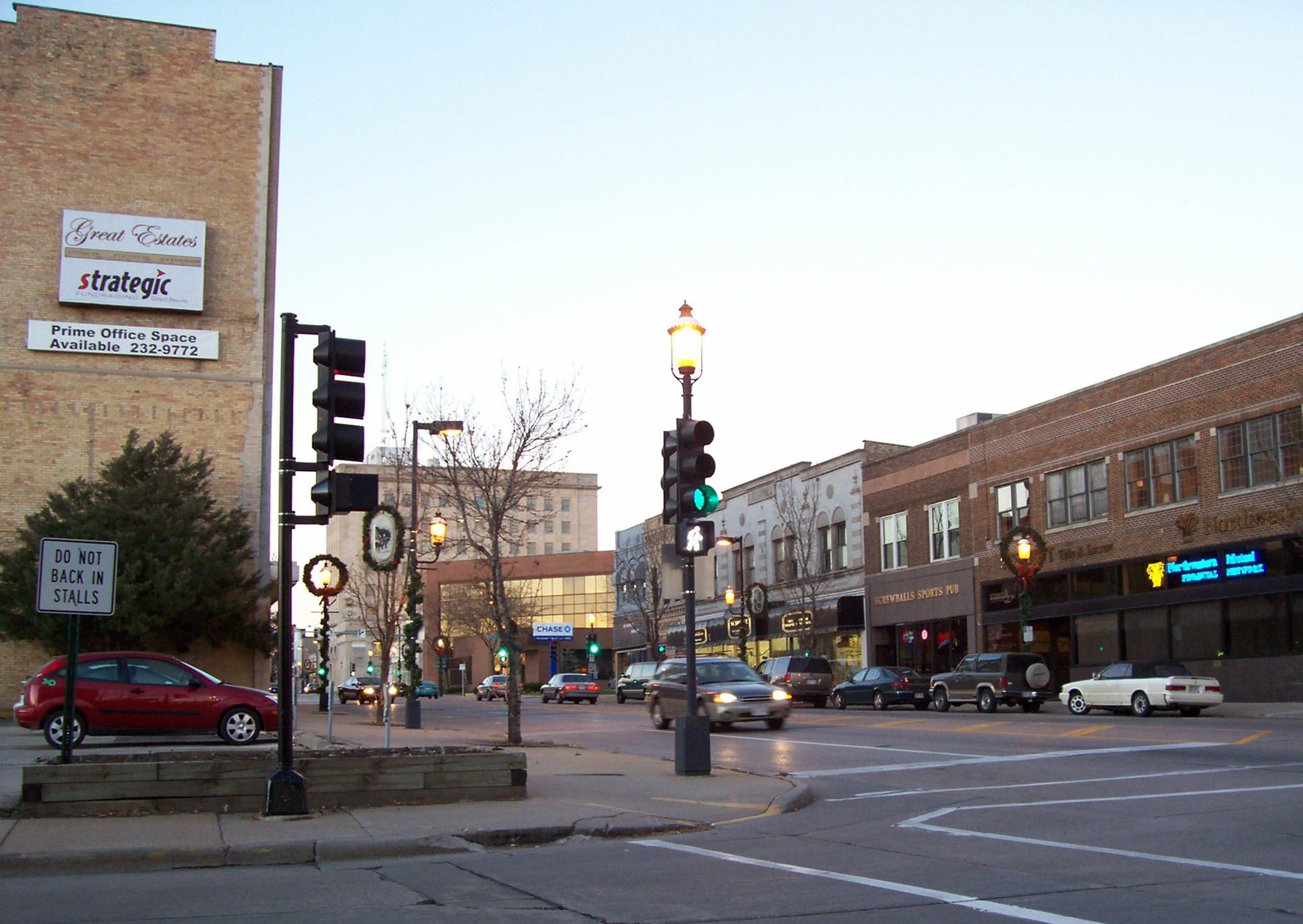
Downtown Oshkosh

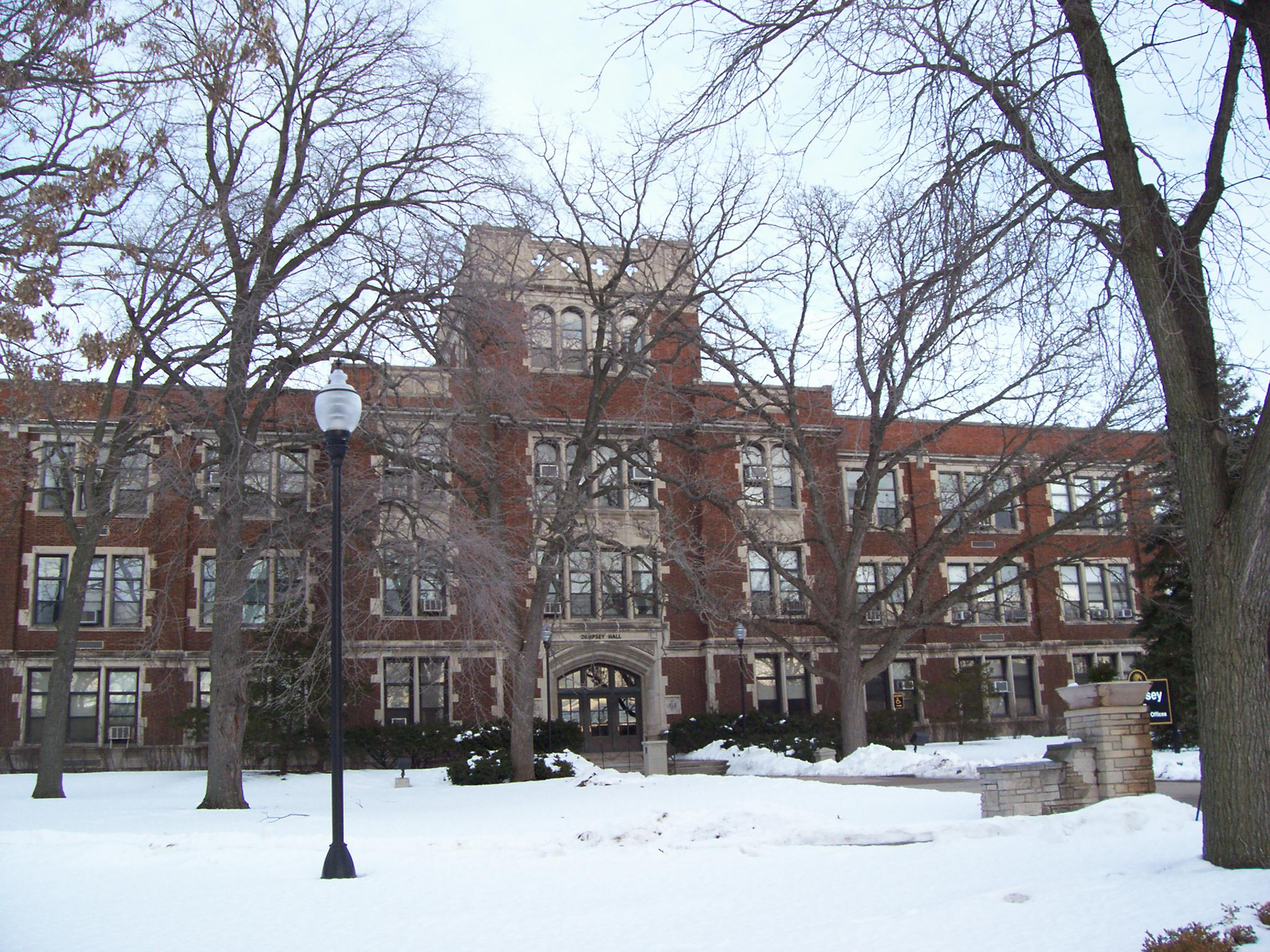
Historic Dempsey Hall on the University of Wisconsin–Oshkosh campus

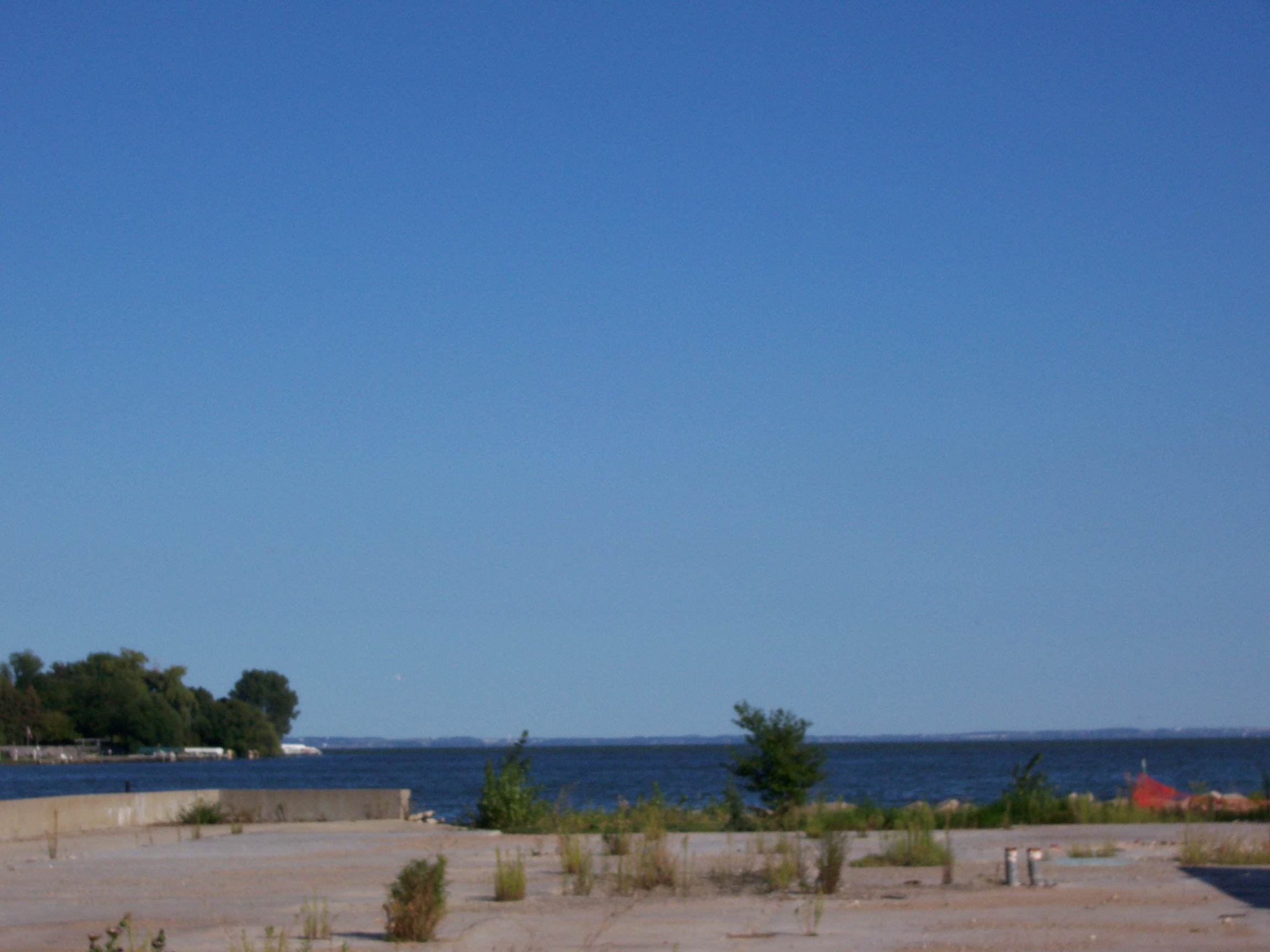
Where the Fox River meets Lake Winnebago

== History ==
The district was created in the 1972 redistricting act (1971 Wisc. Act 304) which first established the numbered district system, replacing the previous system which allocated districts to specific counties. The 54th district was drawn mostly in line with the previous Dodge County 1st district, but exchanged towns in northern Dodge County for towns in western Washington County. The last representative of the Dodge 1st district, Esther Doughty Luckhardt, went on to win the first election to represent the 54th Assembly district. The boundaries of the 54th district have been mostly stable since the 1983 redistricting, comprising the city of Oshkosh and a shifting collection of wards from neighboring towns, but since 2002 has mostly been reduced to the city boundaries of Oshkosh.

== List of past representatives ==
List of representatives to the Wisconsin State Assembly from the 54th district
Member	Party	Residence	Counties represented	Term start	Term end	Ref.
District created
Esther Doughty Luckhardt	Rep.	Horicon	Dodge, Washington	January 1, 1973	January 3, 1983	
Cathy Zeuske	Rep.	Shawano	Oconto, Outagamie, Shawano	January 3, 1983	January 7, 1985	
Carol A. Buettner	Rep.	Oshkosh	Winnebago	January 7, 1985	April 21, 1987	
--Vacant--			Winnebago	April 21, 1987	June 15, 1987	
Gregg Underheim	Rep.	Oshkosh	Winnebago	June 15, 1987	January 1, 2007	
Gordon Hintz	Dem.	Oshkosh	Winnebago	January 1, 2007	January 2, 2023	
Lori Palmeri	Dem.	Oshkosh	Winnebago	January 3, 2023	Current	
