= Esther Doughty Luckhardt =

American Republican politician (1913–2011)

Member of the Wisconsin State Assembly
- In office January 3, 1983 – January 7, 1985
- Preceded by: Richard P. Matty
- Succeeded by: Richard P. Matty
- Constituency: 88th district
- In office January 1, 1973 – January 3, 1983
- Preceded by: District established
- Succeeded by: Cathy Zeuske
- Constituency: 54th district
- In office January 7, 1963 – January 1, 1973
- Preceded by: Elmer L. Genzmer
- Succeeded by: District abolished
- Constituency: Dodge 1st district

Personal details
- Born: Esther Hulda Louise Schwertfeger; June 18, 1913 Wisconsin
- Died: January 14, 2011 (aged 97) Horicon, Wisconsin
- Resting place: Oakhill Cemetery, Horicon, Wisconsin
- Party: Republican
- Spouses: Lyle Edward Doughty (died 1961); Howard L. Luckhardt (m. 1967)
- Children: 3
- Occupation: politician

Esther Doughty Luckhardt (née Schwertfeger; June 18, 1913 – January 14, 2011) was an American insurance and real estate business owner and Republican politician. She represented Dodge County in the Wisconsin State Assembly for 22 years (1963–1985). At the time of her retirement from politics, she had been the longest-serving female member of the Legislature.

== Biography ==
Luckhardt was born Esther Hulda Louise Schwertfeger. She graduated from Horicon High School in Horicon, Wisconsin. She owned and operated a real-estate and insurance business in Horicon. From 1963 until 1985, Luckhardt served in the Wisconsin State Assembly.

Wisconsin State Assembly
Preceded by Elmer L. Genzmer	Member of the Wisconsin State Assembly from the Dodge 1st district January 7, 1963 – January 1, 1973	District abolished
New district	Member of the Wisconsin State Assembly from the 54th district January 1, 1973 – January 3, 1983	Succeeded by Cathy Zeuske
Preceded by Richard P. Matty	Member of the Wisconsin State Assembly from the 88th district January 3, 1983 – January 7, 1985	Succeeded by Richard P. Matty
