= Gregg Underheim =

American politician (born 1950)

Member of the Wisconsin State Assembly from the 54th district
- In office June 15, 1987 – January 3, 2007
- Preceded by: Carol Roessler
- Succeeded by: Gordon Hintz

Personal details
- Born: August 22, 1950 (age 75) La Crosse, Wisconsin
- Party: Republican
- Spouse: none
- Education: University of Wisconsin–La Crosse (B.S.)

Gregg A. Underheim (born August 22, 1950) is a retired American small business owner and Republican politician. He was a member of the Wisconsin State Assembly for nearly 20 years (1987–2007), representing Oshkosh. He was chair of the Assembly Health Committee for 12 of his 20 years in the State Assembly.

== Early life ==
Underheim was born in La Crosse, Wisconsin, and graduated from La Crosse Central High School in 1968. He graduated from the University of Wisconsin–La Crosse, then became a high school English teacher at Caledonia, Minnesota. He resigned from his teaching position in 1978 to begin working in politics.

== Career ==
Underheim tried to meet with Karl Rove in Texas, attempted (but failed) to meet with Howard Baker in Tennessee, and attempted (and failed) to become a speechwriter for the Republican National Committee in Washington D.C. He returned to Wisconsin and joined Tom Petri's campaign for Congress. Petri won the race, and Underheim joined his staff full-time.

Underheim ran for the State Assembly in 1987, and was elected as the representative from Oshkosh. He focused on health-related issues during his term. In 1998, Underheim proposed legislation that required physicians to provide and pay for the submission of claims data.

Underheim became involved in controversies in the mid-1990s about how to teach reading to children. He argued in favor of research-supported, phonics-based reading programs. Underheim used this controversy as a key issue in his first race for State Superintendent of Public Instruction in 1997, but he was not successful in that election. He sought election to the same office a second time in 2005, and was again unsuccessful. Underheim received a lifetime recognition award from the Wisconsin Hospital Association in 2006.
