= Rosemary Hinkfuss =

American politician (1931–2016)

Member of the Wisconsin State Assembly
- In office January 4, 1993 – January 3, 1995
- Preceded by: John Gard
- Succeeded by: Carol Kelso
- Constituency: 88th district
- In office January 3, 1989 – January 4, 1993
- Preceded by: Otto Junkermann
- Succeeded by: John H. Ainsworth
- Constituency: 6th district

Member of the Brown County Board of Supervisors
- In office 1974–1982

Member of the Green Bay City Council
- In office 1974–1982

Personal details
- Born: Rosemary T. Walsh; September 30, 1931 Lima, Ohio, U.S.
- Died: March 2, 2016 (aged 84) Green Bay, Wisconsin, U.S.
- Resting place: Allouez Catholic Cemetery, Green Bay, Wisconsin
- Party: Democratic
- Spouse: William
- Children: 6
- Education: Cardinal Stritch University
- Profession: teacher, politician

Rosemary T. Hinkfuss (née Walsh; September 30, 1931 – March 2, 2016) was a former member of the Wisconsin State Assembly and a member of the Green Bay Packers Board of Directors.

== Biography ==
Hinkfuss was born Rosemary T. Walsh on September 30, 1931, in Lima, Ohio, to William and Marie Walsh. She later graduated from Cardinal Stritch University. Hinkfuss served on the board of directors for Premontre High School, Girl Scouts of the USA, and the Green Bay Packers. She was the first woman ever to serve on the Packers' board of directors.

She was married to William Hinkfuss in 1957; they had six children together. Hinkfuss died on March 2, 2016, in Green Bay, Wisconsin.

== Political career ==
Hinkfuss first became involved in politics as a volunteer for John F. Kennedy's campaign in the 1960 United States presidential election. She was first elected to the Assembly in 1988 and was re-elected in 1990 and 1992. She was defeated in the 1994 election by Republican Carol Kelso and left office in January 1995. Additionally, Hinkfuss was a member of the Green Bay, Wisconsin City Council and a Brown County, Wisconsin, supervisor from 1974 to 1982. She was a Democrat, and received the Lifetime Achievement Award for the Democratic Party of Brown County in 2014. Hinkfuss was also the Democratic Party nominee for the 1987 Wisconsin State Senate special election in the 2nd district.
