= James Soletski =

American politician (1948–2024)

James "Jim" Soletski
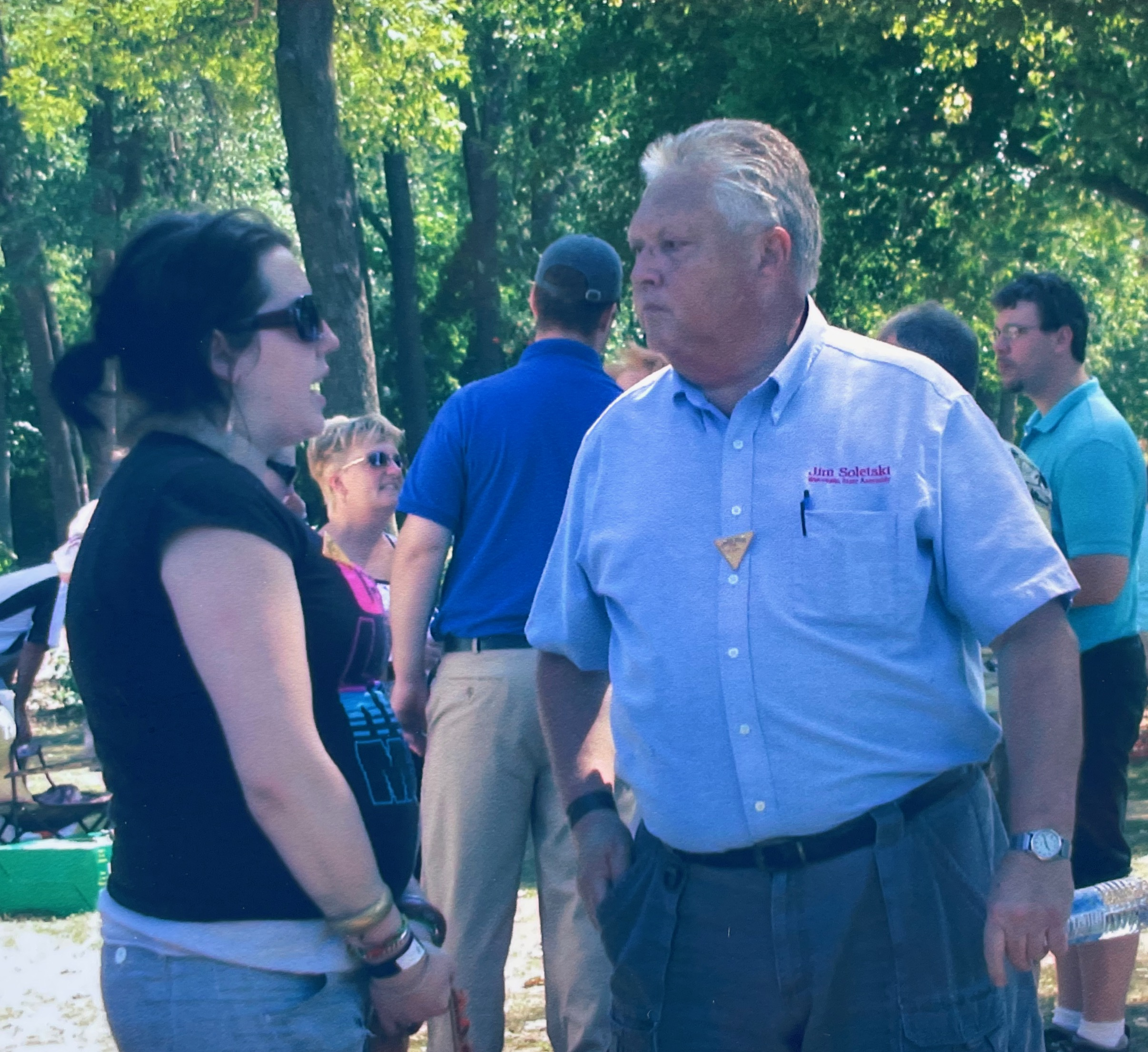

Member of the Wisconsin State Assembly from the 88th district
- In office January 3, 2007 – January 3, 2011
- Preceded by: Judy Krawczyk
- Succeeded by: John Klenke

Personal details
- Born: October 7, 1948 Green Bay, Wisconsin, U.S.
- Died: August 20, 2024 (aged 75)
- Party: Democratic
- Profession: Nuclear utility industry worker

James Soletski (October 7, 1948 – August 20, 2024) was an American politician who was a Democratic Party member of the Wisconsin State Assembly, representing the 88th Assembly District from 2007 through 2011.

== Life and career ==
Soletski was born on October 7, 1948 in Green Bay, Wisconsin, where he also resided.

Soletski served as Chairman of the Assembly Energy and Utilities Committee, and as a member of the Colleges and Universities, Consumer Protection, Criminal Justice, Elections and Campaign Reform and Labor committees. In addition to these responsibilities, he sat on the Special Committee on State-Tribal Relations. In the November 2010 election, Soletski was defeated by Republican nominee John Klenke.

Soletski died August 20, 2024, at the age of 75.
