= Tavern League of Wisconsin =

American trade association

- Abbreviation: TLW
- Formation: 1935
- Legal status: Active
- Purpose: Trade organization
- Headquarters: Fitchburg, Wisconsin
- Location: State of Wisconsin
- Fields: Alcohol industry
- Website: https://www.tlw.org

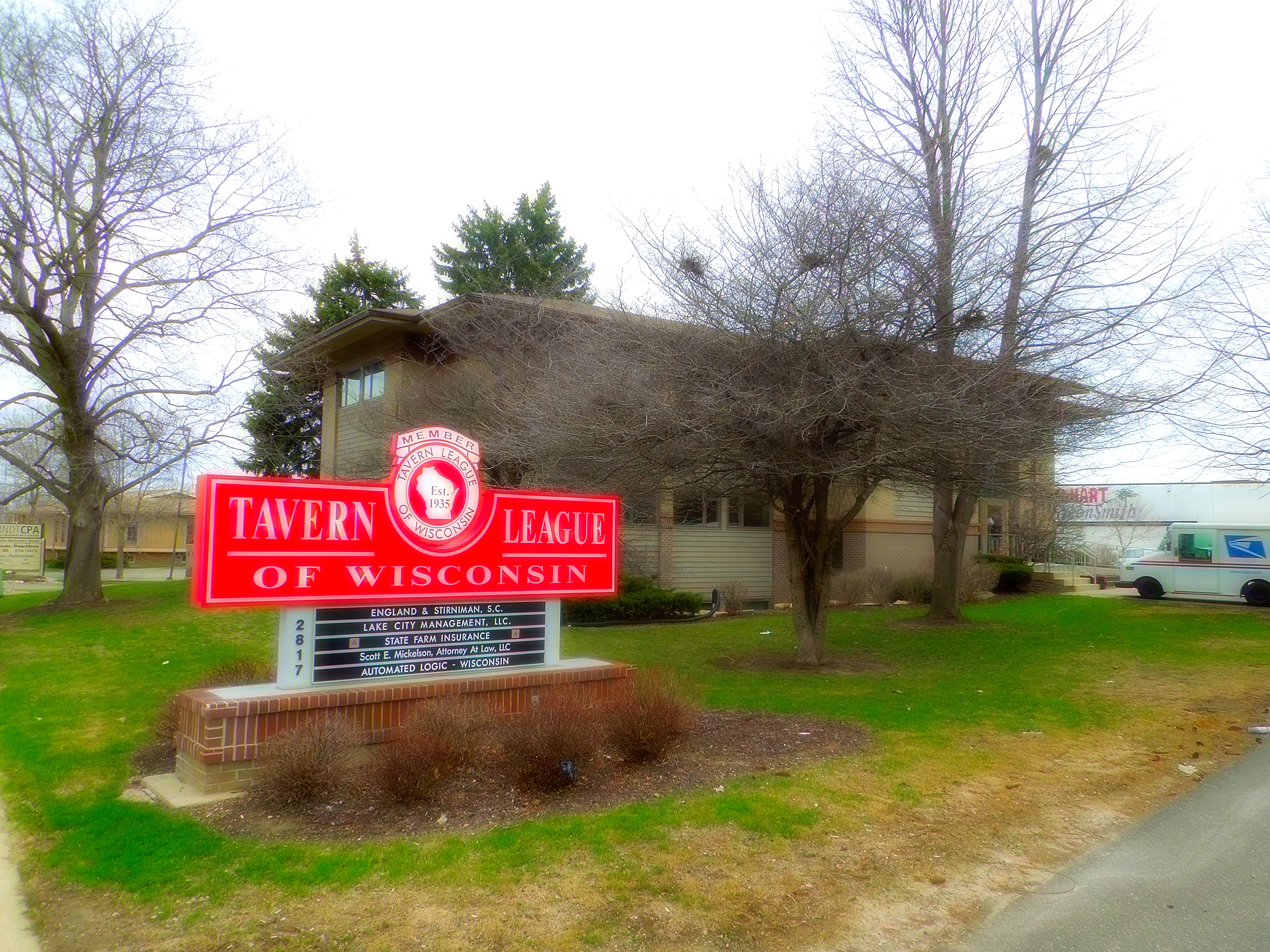
Tavern League of Wisconsin - panoramio

The Tavern League of Wisconsin (TLW) is a trade association of alcoholic beverage retailers in the state of Wisconsin. The League was created in 1935, two years after the end of Prohibition, and today has 5,000 members. The League is headquartered in Fitchburg, Wisconsin.

== History ==
Established in 1935, the TLW seeks to support its members through the lobbying of local and federal policy. Policy the TLW lobbies include opposition to increases in alcohol and cigarette taxes and licensing laws seen as onerous, and opposition to restrictions on gambling machines. The TLW supports programs that aim to combat drunk driving by providing rides to and from bars. At the same time, the TLW has condemned campaigns against binge drinking in Wisconsin as an attempt to "demonize" people who drink casually to relax. In 2005, lobbyists with the TLW were investigated by the State Ethics Board; the investigation was launched after State Senator Russell Decker was pulled over for drunk driving shortly after leaving an all-you-can-drink event for lawmakers hosted by the TLW.

The TLW has focused especially on opposing smoking bans in drinking establishments. When a smoking ban law was proposed in 2008, the TLW worked with state senate majority leader Decker to insert provisions requiring that the ban would not take effect until July 5, 2010, giving members time to adapt, and preventing municipalities from passing laws that would have the same effect in the grace period. Previously, the TLW had received money and lobbying help from R.J. Reynolds Tobacco Company to fight smoking ban legislation in Wisconsin. Researchers from the University of Wisconsin–Madison accused the TLW of working in concert with the tobacco industry and other trade groups to undermine Wisconsin's anti-smoking efforts, particularly its attempts to restrict the sale of cigarettes to minors. The study's conclusions were disputed by Philip Morris and by other members of the coalition.

In recent years, League lobbyists have actively campaigned to lower the drinking age in the state. In 2024, Mark Jefferson, a member of the Republican Party of Wisconsin became Executive director of the TLW.

== See also ==
- Alcohol laws of Wisconsin
- Dry county
- List of dry communities by U.S. state - Wisconsin
