= Lori Palmeri =

American politician (born 1967)

Member of the Wisconsin State Assembly from the 54th district
- Incumbent
- Assumed office January 3, 2023
- Preceded by: Gordon Hintz

67th Mayor of Oshkosh, Wisconsin
- In office April 2019 – April 2023
- Preceded by: Steve Cummings
- Succeeded by: Matt Mugerauer

Personal details
- Born: Lori Ann Clarke; May 25, 1967 (age 58) Takoma Park, Maryland, U.S.
- Party: Democratic
- Spouse: Anthony Palmeri
- Education: University of Wisconsin–Oshkosh (B.A.); University of Wisconsin–Milwaukee (M.U.P.)
- Website: Official website; Campaign website

Lori Ann Palmeri (née Clarke; born May 25, 1967) is an American Democratic politician. She is a member of the Wisconsin State Assembly, representing Wisconsin's 54th Assembly district since January 2023. She previously served as the 67th mayor of Oshkosh, Wisconsin.

== Biography ==
Lori Palmeri was born in Takoma Park, Maryland, May 25, 1967. She completed the G.E.D. in the 1990s, and worked as a contract paralegal. She soon returned to Wisconsin, where she worked in an IT job for ProVantage Health Services, and then moved to Kimberly, Wisconsin, where she worked for the Kimberly Clark Corporation.

She took college courses at the University of Wisconsin–Oshkosh, Fox Cities Campus, and ultimately moved to Oshkosh, Wisconsin, in 2008. In Oshkosh, she studied urban planning at the University of Wisconsin–Oshkosh and worked as an intern for the East Central Wisconsin Regional Planning Commission. She earned her bachelor's degree in 2010, and went on to obtain her master's in urban planning from the University of Wisconsin–Milwaukee in 2013.

She worked a number of jobs in the city of Oshkosh, and started her own consulting firm in 2015.

== Political career ==
In Spring 2016, she was elected to the Oshkosh Common Council in an at-large seat. In 2019, she challenged incumbent mayor Steve Cummings and prevailed with 51.4% of the vote. She went on to win re-election in 2021, defeating Kris Larson.

In March 2022, Oshkosh's state representative Gordon Hintz announced he would retire after eight terms in the Assembly. Prior to making his announcement, however, he called Palmeri to inform her of his decision and asked her to run for his seat. Palmeri took up the challenge and entered the race. She did not face an opponent in the Democratic primary. She went on to win the general election with 54% of the vote, defeating Republican Donnie Herman.

She was sworn into the Assembly in January 2023. She did not run for re-election as mayor in 2023, and her term ended shortly after the start of the legislative session.

== Personal life and family ==
Lori is now married to Anthony "Tony" Palmeri. Palmeri is a professor at the University of Wisconsin–Oshkosh, and served several years on the Oshkosh common council. Lori has two adult children and two grandchildren.

== Electoral history ==
=== Oshkosh Mayor (2019, 2021) ===
2019 Oshkosh, Wisconsin, Mayoral Election
| Party | Candidate | Votes | % | ±% |
|---|---|---|---|---|
General Election, April 2, 2019
| Nonpartisan | Lori Palmeri | 4,681 | 51.78% | |
| Nonpartisan | Steve Cummings (incumbent) | 4,359 | 48.22% | −12.88% |
| Plurality | | 322 | 3.56% | -20.37% |
| Total votes | | 9,040 | 100.0% | +25.64% |

2021 Oshkosh, Wisconsin, Mayoral Election
| Party | Candidate | Votes | % | ±% |
|---|---|---|---|---|
Nonpartisan Primary, February 16, 2021 (top two)
| Nonpartisan | Lori Palmeri (incumbent) | 1,774 | 44.37% | |
| Nonpartisan | Kris Larsen | 946 | 23.66% | |
| Nonpartisan | Deb Allison-Asby | 843 | 21.09% | |
| Nonpartisan | Robert E. Wilcox | 435 | 10.88% | |
| Total votes | | 3,998 | 100.0% | |
General Election, April 6, 2021
| Nonpartisan | Lori Palmeri (incumbent) | 4,517 | 51.59% | −0.19% |
| Nonpartisan | Kris Larsen | 4,183 | 47.78% | |
| Nonpartisan | Robert E. Wilcox (write-in) | 55 | 0.63% | |
| Plurality | | 334 | 3.81% | +0.25% |
| Total votes | | 8,755 | 100.0% | -3.15% |

=== Wisconsin Assembly (2022–present) ===
| Year | Election | Date | Elected | | | | Defeated | | | | Total | Plurality |
|---|---|---|---|---|---|---|---|---|---|---|---|---|
| 2022 | General | Nov. 8 | Lori Palmeri | Democratic | 12,124 | 53.79% | Donnie Herman | Rep. | 10,382 | 46.06% | 22,538 | 1,742 |
| 2024 | General | Nov. 5 | Lori Palmeri (inc) | Democratic | 14,003 | 52.57% | Tim Paterson | Rep. | 12,590 | 47.27% | 26,635 | 1,413 |

== See also ==
- List of mayors of Oshkosh, Wisconsin

Wisconsin State Assembly
| Preceded by Gordon Hintz | Member of the Wisconsin State Assembly from the 54th district January 3, 2023 – present | Incumbent |
Political offices
| Preceded by Steve Cummings | Mayor of Oshkosh, Wisconsin; April 2019 – April 2023 | Succeeded by Matt Mugerauer |
