= Cathy Zeuske =

American politician (born 1958)

Cate Zeuske

9th Secretary of the Wisconsin Department of Revenue
- In office November 27, 1996 – March 2001
- Governor: Tommy Thompson
- Preceded by: Mark D. Bugher
- Succeeded by: Richard G. Chandler

31st Treasurer of Wisconsin
- In office January 7, 1991 – January 3, 1995
- Governor: Tommy Thompson
- Preceded by: Charles P. Smith
- Succeeded by: Jack Voight

Member of the Wisconsin State Assembly
- In office January 7, 1985 – January 7, 1991
- Preceded by: Barbara Ulichny
- Succeeded by: John H. Ainsworth
- Constituency: 4th district
- In office January 3, 1983 – January 7, 1985
- Preceded by: Esther Doughty Luckhardt
- Succeeded by: Carol A. Buettner
- Constituency: 54th district

Personal details
- Born: Cathy Susan Zeuske; December 4, 1958 (age 67) Clintonville, Wisconsin, U.S.
- Party: Republican
- Spouse: John Gard (m. 1990)
- Children: 2

Cathy Susan "Cate" Zeuske (born December 4, 1958), is an American Republican politician who served as the 31st State Treasurer of Wisconsin and 9th Secretary of the Wisconsin Department of Revenue. She was also elected to four terms in the Wisconsin State Assembly and was Deputy Secretary of the Wisconsin Department of Administration.

Zeuske is married to John Gard, a former speaker of the Wisconsin State Assembly.

== Early life and career ==
A native of Clintonville, Wisconsin, Zeuske graduated from Shawano High School and then attended McGill University. She received her B.A. from the University of Wisconsin–Madison. Prior to her political career, she worked as an insurance agent.

== Public office ==
Zeuske was elected to the Wisconsin State Assembly in 1982 at the age of 23. She won re-election three times and served until 1991, having decided to forgo re-election and instead run against incumbent State Treasurer Charles Smith in 1990.

=== State Treasurer (1991–1995) ===
On November 6, 1990, Zeuske was elected Wisconsin State Treasurer. During her time in office she established the State Treasurer's Advisory Council and State Treasurer's Annual Conference for Local and County Clerks/Treasurers. She was also a member of the State Board of Commissioners of Public Lands, State Board of Canvassers, State Depository Selection Board, Insurance Security Fund, State of Wisconsin Investment Board, Wisconsin Retirement Fund, National Association of State Treasurers, Heritage Tourism Advisory Council, Wisconsin Trust for Historic Preservation, Governor's Commission on Dental Care, and Council on State-Local Relations.

She gave up her reelection bid in 1994 to compete in the Republican Senate primary for the opportunity to run against incumbent Democratic Senator Herb Kohl. In the September primary, she lost the nomination to State Senator Robert Welch. On November 8, 1994, Republican Jack Voight was elected as the new State Treasurer, while Senator Kohl went on to defeat State Senator Welch 58% to 41%.

=== Appointed positions ===
In 1995, Governor Tommy Thompson appointed Zeuske to serve as deputy director of the Wisconsin Housing and Economic Development Authority. She served in that role until 1999, when Thompson appointed her to serve as secretary of the Wisconsin Department of Revenue. While in that role, Zeuske served as a member of the platform committee for the 2000 Republican National Convention.

From 2001 to 2015, Zeuske was the administrative director of a non-profit organization and international leadership academy for public officials.

In 2015, Zeuske was appointed by Governor Scott Walker to serve as deputy secretary of the Wisconsin Department of Administration. She resigned in May 2018.

She was a member of the Wisconsin Women for Trump coalition in 2016.

== Personal life ==
Zeuske is married to John Gard, who served as Speaker of the Wisconsin State Assembly from 2003 until 2007. They have two children.

== Electoral history ==
=== Wisconsin Treasurer (1990) ===
Wisconsin State Treasurer Election, 1990
| Party | Candidate | Votes | % | ±% |
|---|---|---|---|---|
General Election, November 6, 1990
| Republican | Cathy S. Zeuske | 623,548 | 48.70% | +5.01% |
| Democratic | Charles P. Smith (incumbent) | 609,505 | 47.61% | −5.07% |
| Labor–Farm | Lucille Berrien | 28,141 | 2.20% | −1.43% |
| Independent | David A. Ameringer | 19,077 | 1.49% | |
| Plurality | | 14,043 | 1.10% | -7.88% |
| Total votes | | 1,280,271 | 100.0% | -6.99% |
| Republican gain from Democratic | | Swing | 10.08% | |

=== United States Senate (1994) ===
United States Senate election in Wisconsin, 1994
| Party | Candidate | Votes | % | ±% |
|---|---|---|---|---|
Republican Primary, September 13, 1994
| Republican | Robert T. Welch | 157,109 | 47.39% | |
| Republican | Matthew Gunderson | 74,460 | 22.46% | |
| Republican | Cathy S. Zeuske | 56,248 | 16.97% | |
| Republican | Thomas M. Fitzpatrick | 43,695 | 13.18% | |
| Total votes | | 331,512 | 100.0% | |

Party political offices
| Preceded by William Lorge | Republican nominee for State Treasurer of Wisconsin; 1990 | Succeeded by Jack Voight |
Wisconsin State Assembly
| Preceded by Esther Doughty Luckhardt | Member of the Wisconsin State Assembly from the 54th district January 3, 1983 – January 7, 1985 | Succeeded by Carol A. Buettner |
| Preceded by Barbara Ulichny | Member of the Wisconsin State Assembly from the 4th district January 7, 1985 – January 7, 1991 | Succeeded by John H. Ainsworth |
Government offices
| Preceded by Mark D. Bugher | Secretary of the Wisconsin Department of Revenue; November 27, 1996 – March 2001 | Succeeded by Richard G. Chandler |
Political offices
| Preceded by Charles P. Smith | State Treasurer of Wisconsin; January 7, 1991 – January 3, 1995 | Succeeded by Jack Voight |
