= John Ainsworth (Wisconsin politician) =

American politician (born 1940)

Member of the Wisconsin State Assembly
- In office January 4, 1993 – January 1, 2007
- Preceded by: Rosemary Hinkfuss
- Succeeded by: Gary Tauchen
- Constituency: 6th Assembly district
- In office January 7, 1991 – January 4, 1993
- Preceded by: Cathy Zeuske
- Succeeded by: Mark A. Green
- Constituency: 4th Assembly district

Personal details
- Born: September 21, 1940 (age 85) Shawano County, Wisconsin, U.S.
- Party: Republican

John H. Ainsworth (born September 21, 1940) is an American dairy farmer and Republican politician from Shawano County, Wisconsin. He served 16 years as a member of the Wisconsin State Assembly (1991–2007).

== Biography ==
Born in Shawano County, Wisconsin, Ainsworth graduated from Shawano High School and worked most of his life as a dairy farmer. He was elected to the Wisconsin State Assembly in 1990, and served 8 terms, retiring in January 2007.

Wisconsin State Assembly
Preceded by Cathy Zeuske	Member of the Wisconsin State Assembly from the 4th district January 7, 1991 – January 4, 1993	Succeeded by Mark Andrew Green
Preceded by Rosemary Hinkfuss	Member of the Wisconsin State Assembly from the 6th district January 4, 1993 – January 1, 2007	Succeeded by Gary Tauchen
