= Leslie R. Stevenson =

American politician

Leslie Roy Stevenson (July 31, 1915 – November 24, 1981) was a member of the Wisconsin State Assembly.

== Biography ==
Stevenson was born on July 31, 1915, in Marinette, Wisconsin. He attended Jordan College and the University of Wisconsin–Madison. During World War II, he served with the United States Army Corps of Engineers in the European Theater of Operations United States Army. He died on November 24, 1981.

== Political career ==
Stevenson was elected to the Assembly in 1965. Previously, he was president of the Marinette, Wisconsin City Council from 1958 to 1961. He was a Democrat.
