= Wisconsin State Legislature =

Bicameral state legislature of Wisconsin

- 107th Wisconsin Legislature

Type
- Type: Bicameral
- Houses: State Senate; State Assembly

Leadership
- Senate President: Mary Felzkowski (R) since January 6, 2025
- Assembly Speaker: Robin Vos (R) since January 7, 2013

Structure
- Seats: 132; 33 Senators; 99 Representatives
- State Senate political groups: Republican (18); Democratic (15)
- State Assembly political groups: Republican (54); Democratic (45)
- Authority: Article IV, Wisconsin Constitution
- Salary: $55,141 + per diem .. (Salary is $57,407 if living in Dane County)

Elections
- Last State Senate election: November 5, 2024
- Last State Assembly election: November 5, 2024
- Next State Senate election: November 3, 2026
- Next State Assembly election: November 3, 2026

Meeting place
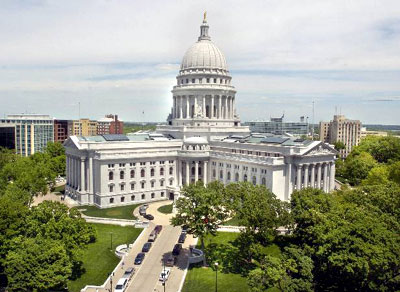
- Wisconsin State Capitol; Madison

Website
- https://legis.wisconsin.gov

The Wisconsin State Legislature is the state legislature of the U.S. state of Wisconsin. The legislature is a bicameral body composed of the upper house, Wisconsin State Senate, and the lower Wisconsin State Assembly, both of which have had Republican majorities since January 2011. With both houses combined, the legislature has 132 members representing an equal number of constituent districts. The legislature convenes at the state capitol in Madison.

The current sitting is the 107th Wisconsin Legislature.

== History ==
The United States first organized Wisconsin in 1787 under the Northwest Ordinance after Great Britain yielded the land to them in the Treaty of Paris. It became the Wisconsin Territory in 1836 and a U.S. state on May 29, 1848. The 1850s saw an influx of European immigrants. The legislature was dominated alternately by two political parties in its first century: the Republican and Progressive parties.

In 1995, the Republican Party took control of the legislature for the first time since 1969, and have maintained their control of both houses since, except for a brief period between 2009 and 2011. In the 2016 Wisconsin elections, Republicans secured their largest majority in the Assembly since 1956, and in 2018, the party maintained their overwhelming control of the legislature despite receiving fewer total votes.

Congressional districts have been disputed since at least 2016. After Republican Governor Scott Walker then signed a redistricting plan, at least one U.S. court found the districts to be unconstitutional partisan gerrymandering. Other controversies include "prison gerrymandering," where prisons are counted towards the population of a district despite its inmates coming from elsewhere. On December 22, 2023, the Wisconsin Supreme Court ruled in Clarke v. Wisconsin Elections Commission that the state legislative maps violated the contiguity requirement of Article IV, Sections 4 and 5 of the Constitution of Wisconsin. The Court ordered the legislature to draw new maps ahead of the 2024 Wisconsin elections.

== Membership ==
=== Qualifications and terms ===
To serve in the Wisconsin Legislature, individuals must be a resident of the state for at least one year preceding their election and be a qualified elector in the district they are elected to represent.

All 99 members of the Wisconsin Assembly are elected in a two-year term cycle without term limits. Similarly, all 33 members of the Wisconsin Senate are elected in a four year cycle, also without term limits. Half of the Senate is elected every two years. Prior to an amendment in the Wisconsin Constitution in 1881, Assembly members served a one-year term, while Senators were elected every two years. The 107th Wisconsin Legislature began on January 6, 2025.

=== Officers ===
Members of both houses of the legislature vote within their ranks to select presiding officers, such as the Speaker of the Assembly and the President of the Senate. These high level positions reflect the party majority in both chambers. An amendment to the state constitution in 1979 removed the Lieutenant Governor of Wisconsin as the presiding officer of the Senate, allowing Senators to vote within their ranks for a chamber president. Similarly, majority and minority leaders are also selected by party strength in the legislative houses and within their own respective caucus.

=== Salary and benefits ===
Legislators in both the Senate and the Assembly receive an annual salary of $55,141. Senators receive per diem of up to $115 to cover living expenses when they are in Dane County, Wisconsin on state business, unless their district is in Dane County, in which case they receive per diem of up to $57.50. Assembly members outside of Dane County receive overnight per diem up to $155. Otherwise, they receive $76.50 per diem, the same rate as assembly members in Dane County. Legislators also receive $75 per month in "out-of-session" pay when the legislature is in session for three days or less. Over two years, each legislator is allotted $66,008 to cover general office expenses, printing, postage and district mailings.

== Rules and procedures ==
In both chambers of the Wisconsin Legislature, a quorum is defined as a majority of current members. The majority of a quorum is needed to pass legislation on the floor of the chamber. Three-fifths of the members elected is the quorum necessary for passage or concurrence in either house of any fiscal bill. Proposals may not be introduced or offered unless they are put in proper form by the legislative reference staff if requested by members or members-elect of the legislature. Both houses of the legislature review a bill before it becomes law, and if each chamber approves the bill, the state's Governor will review it. If the Governor signs the bill, it passes into law, but if the Governor vetoes the bill, it will return to the legislature. It is possible for the legislature to override a veto and pass the bill into law itself, but this requires a two-thirds majority vote in both the Senate and the State Assembly.

== Law of Wisconsin ==
State law is contained in the Wisconsin Constitution and the various statutes enacted by the legislature.

The interpretation of state law and its application in specific cases are undertaken by the Wisconsin Supreme Court, based in Madison, Wisconsin. The law of the Menominee also applies within the Menominee Indian Reservation. The "Laws of Wisconsin" are published annually by the state's legislative reference bureau, "no later than the end of each session".

== See also ==
- Alcohol laws of Wisconsin
- Gun laws in Wisconsin
- Impeachment in Wisconsin
- List of Wisconsin state legislatures
