= John Klenke =

American politician (1958–2023)

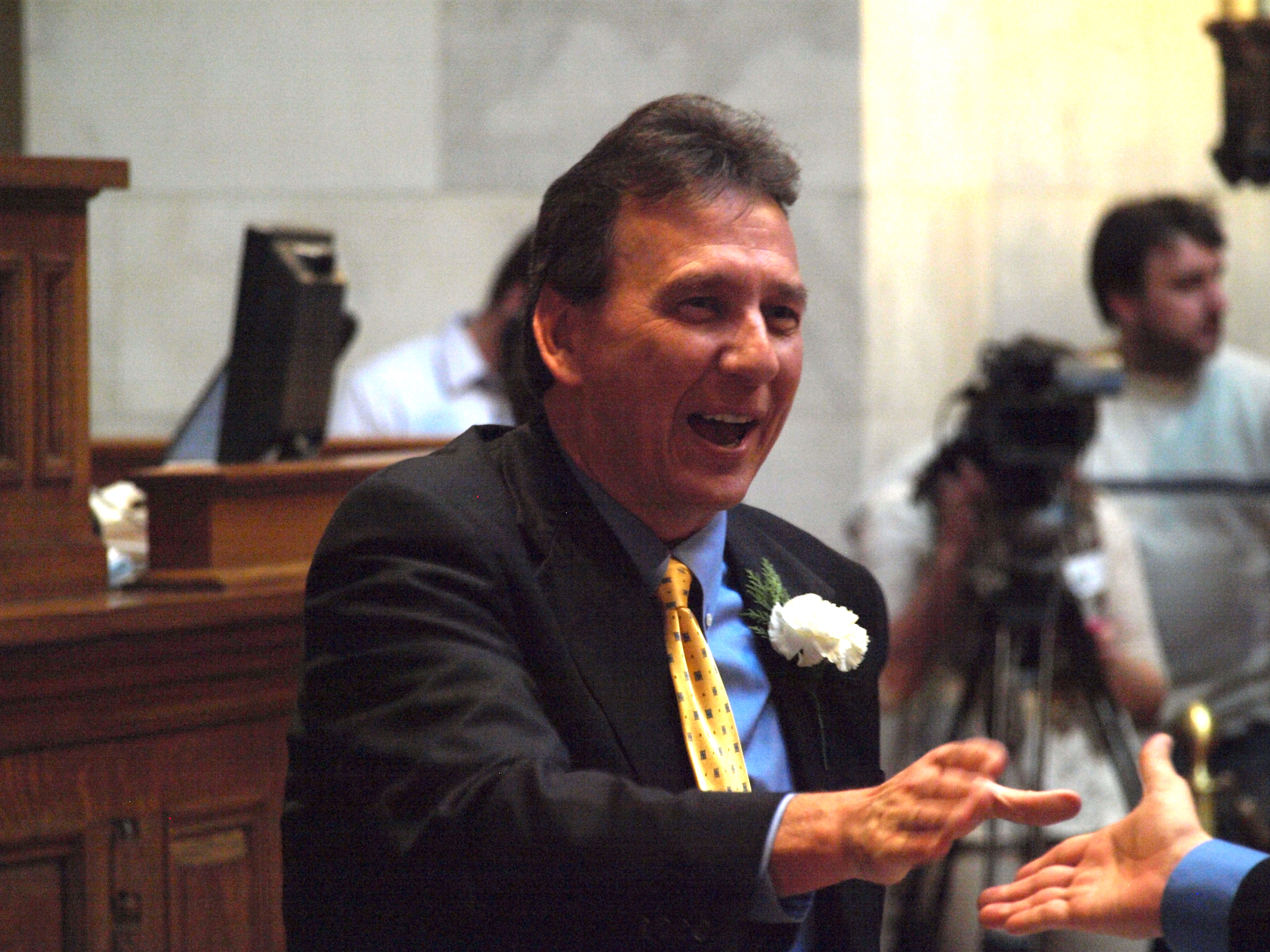
- Klenke in 2013

Member of the Wisconsin State Assembly from the 88th district
- In office January 3, 2011 – January 3, 2015
- Preceded by: James Soletski
- Succeeded by: John Macco

Personal details
- Born: April 25, 1958 Green Bay, Wisconsin, U.S.
- Died: October 10, 2023 (aged 65)
- Party: Republican
- Spouse: Charlotte
- Children: 6
- Education: UW-Madison, UW-Milwaukee
- Profession: Business executive, politician

John Klenke (April 25, 1958 – October 10, 2023) was an American politician in the state of Wisconsin who served as a Republican member of the Wisconsin State Assembly, representing the 88th district. In January 2014, he announced he would not seek re-election.

Klenke graduated from University of Wisconsin–Madison in 1980 with a Bachelor of Business Administration degree (Finance) and from University of Wisconsin–Milwaukee in 1982 with a Master of Business Administration degree (Taxation). He worked for Schneider National as a treasurer, vice president of corporate strategy, division president, and director of corporate tax. Klenke retired from his business executive position at Schneider National after being elected to the Wisconsin State Assembly in 2010.

Klenke defeated two-term Democratic incumbent James Soletski in the November 2010 general election. Klenke was unopposed in the primary election.

Klenke died on October 10, 2023, at the age of 65.
