= Property tax equalization =

Process used in calculation of property taxes

Equalization is a step in property taxation to bring a uniformity to tax assessment levels across different geographical areas or classes of properties. Equalization is usually in the form of a uniform percentage of increase or decrease to each area or class of property.

Attempts at explicit equalization in tax assessments date back at least as early as 1799.

== See also ==
- Fair market value
