= Alcohol laws of Wisconsin =

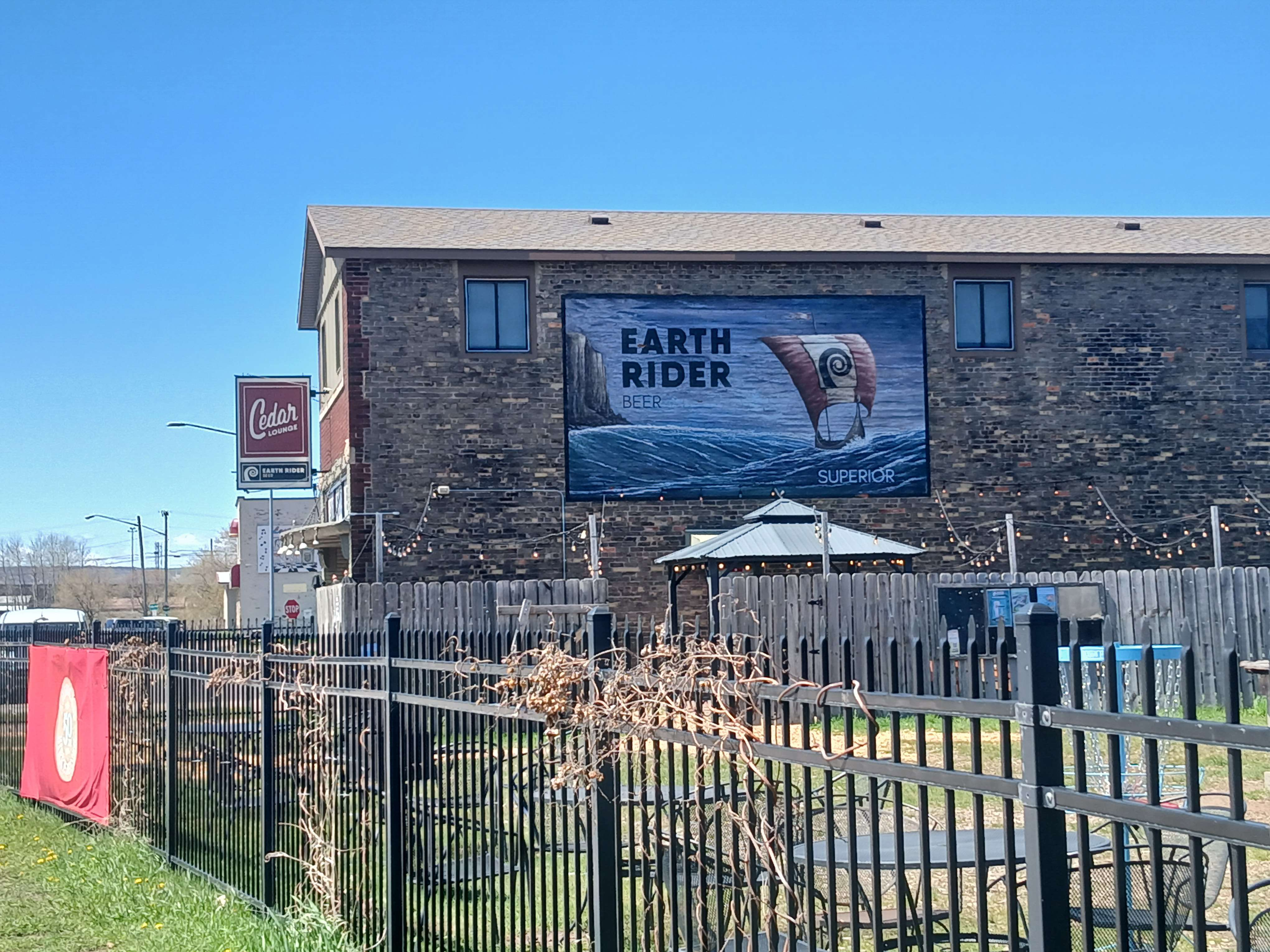
Earth Rider Brewery and Cedar Lounge in Superior, Wisconsin.

The alcohol laws of Wisconsin consist of both statewide statutes and local ordinances governing the sale of alcohol.

== History ==
When Wisconsin became a state, settlers from the eastern United States (known as Yankees) took issue with the consumption of alcohol by German immigrants on Sunday, as well as the prevalence of alcoholism. The Wisconsin legislature passed a law in 1849 that made liquor sellers liable for the costs incurred by local governments in supporting alcoholics. Ten years later, the state prohibited liquor sales on Sundays.

In 1872, alcohol regulation reached new heights in the state with the passage of the Graham Law. This legislation prohibited drunkenness and the sale of alcohol to minors, and required all liquor sellers to post a $2,000 bond (more than $30,000 in 2007 U.S. dollars). German-Americans fought the new law in the courts and at the ballot box. Although they lost challenges in the courts, they were able to elect a legislature friendlier to alcohol consumption. In 1874, the new lawmakers passed less restrictive laws that lowered the bond to $500, allowed Sunday liquor sales, and created certain safe havens for liquor sellers to escape liability for alcoholics.

Alcohol consumption was banned in Wisconsin during Prohibition (1920-1933). But even before Prohibition ended, Wisconsin created work-arounds. In 1926, voters approved a referendum allowing the manufacture of beer, if not its consumption. The state repealed its law enforcing Prohibition in 1929. Wisconsin Senator John J. Blaine sponsored the Act that later became the Twenty-first Amendment to the United States Constitution, ending Prohibition. The state was the second to ratify the amendment on April 25, 1933.

In December 2023, Act 73, one of the largest reforms of Wisconsin alcohol laws was enacted. The law broadened the ability of breweries and wineries to sell products they did not produce in their taprooms, regulated event venues, and established the Department of Alcoholic Beverages under the Wisconsin Department of Revenue.

== Retail sale of alcohol ==
State law prohibits retail sale of liquor and wine between 9:00 p.m. and 6:00 a.m., and beer between midnight and 6:00 a.m. State law allows local municipalities to further restrict retail sales of alcohol, or ban the issuance of retail liquor licenses altogether. Local ordinances often prohibit retail beer sale after 9:00 p.m.

At least two municipalities in Wisconsin prohibited the retail sale of alcohol until recently: the city of Sparta, and the village of Ephraim. In the April 1, 2014, Wisconsin spring election, voters in Sparta narrowly passed a referendum to allow the sale of beer and wine in groceries and convenience stores. The ban on the sale of liquor within the city remains in effect. In the April 5, 2016, voters in Ephraim passed a referendum to allow the sale of beer and wine in restaurants and businesses.

== Beverage sale of alcohol ==
State law requires that bars be closed between 2:00 a.m. and 6:00 a.m. Monday through Friday and between 2:30 a.m. and 6:00 a.m. on Saturday and Sunday. Exceptions are made on New Year's Eve, when no closing is required, and for changes in Daylight Saving Time. State law does not permit municipalities to further restrict when bars must be closed. Municipalities may elect, however, to prohibit the issuance of liquor licenses, making the municipality effectively dry.

== Drinking age ==
The drinking age in Wisconsin is 21. Those under the legal drinking age may be served, possess, or consume alcohol if they are with a parent, legal guardian, or spouse who is of legal drinking age. There is also an exception for alcohol consumed as part of a religious ceremony (e.g., church wine). Those aged 18 to 20 may also possess (but not consume) alcohol as part of their employment. In the early 70s the sale of alcohol was reduced to the age of 18. The 1983 Wisconsin Act 74, effective July 1, 1984, created a drinking age of 19. Meeting in special session at the call of the governor, the legislature enacted 1985 Wisconsin Act 337, which raised the drinking age to 21 and brought the state into compliance with the NMDA (National Minimum Drinking Age) on September 1, 1986.

The NMDA law was amended to permit an exception for those persons who were between ages 18 and 21 on the effective date of the law. Wisconsin 19- and 20-year-olds were "grandfathered in" by this exception after enactment of Act 337. In effect, the state did not have a uniform age of 21 until September 1, 1988.

== OWI Penalties ==
Wisconsin has no jail sentences for an individual's first offense of operating under the influence (OWI), as such matters are not treated as criminal offenses. The range of financial penalties, period of revocation of driver's license, and (for second and subsequent offenses) period of incarceration increases for each subsequent offense.

== See also ==
- Dry county
- List of dry communities by U.S. state § Wisconsin
- Tavern League of Wisconsin
