= Judy Krawczyk =

American politician

Judy Krawczyk (born January 24, 1939) is an American Republican politician from Wisconsin.

Born in Green Bay, Wisconsin, Krawczyk was a businesswoman. She served in the Wisconsin State Assembly from 2001 to 2007, when she was defeated in 2006.
