= 2012 Wisconsin State Assembly election =

- November 6, 2012

All 99 seats in the Wisconsin State Assembly 50 seats needed for a majority
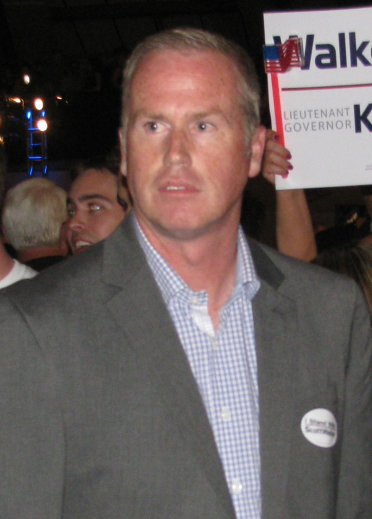

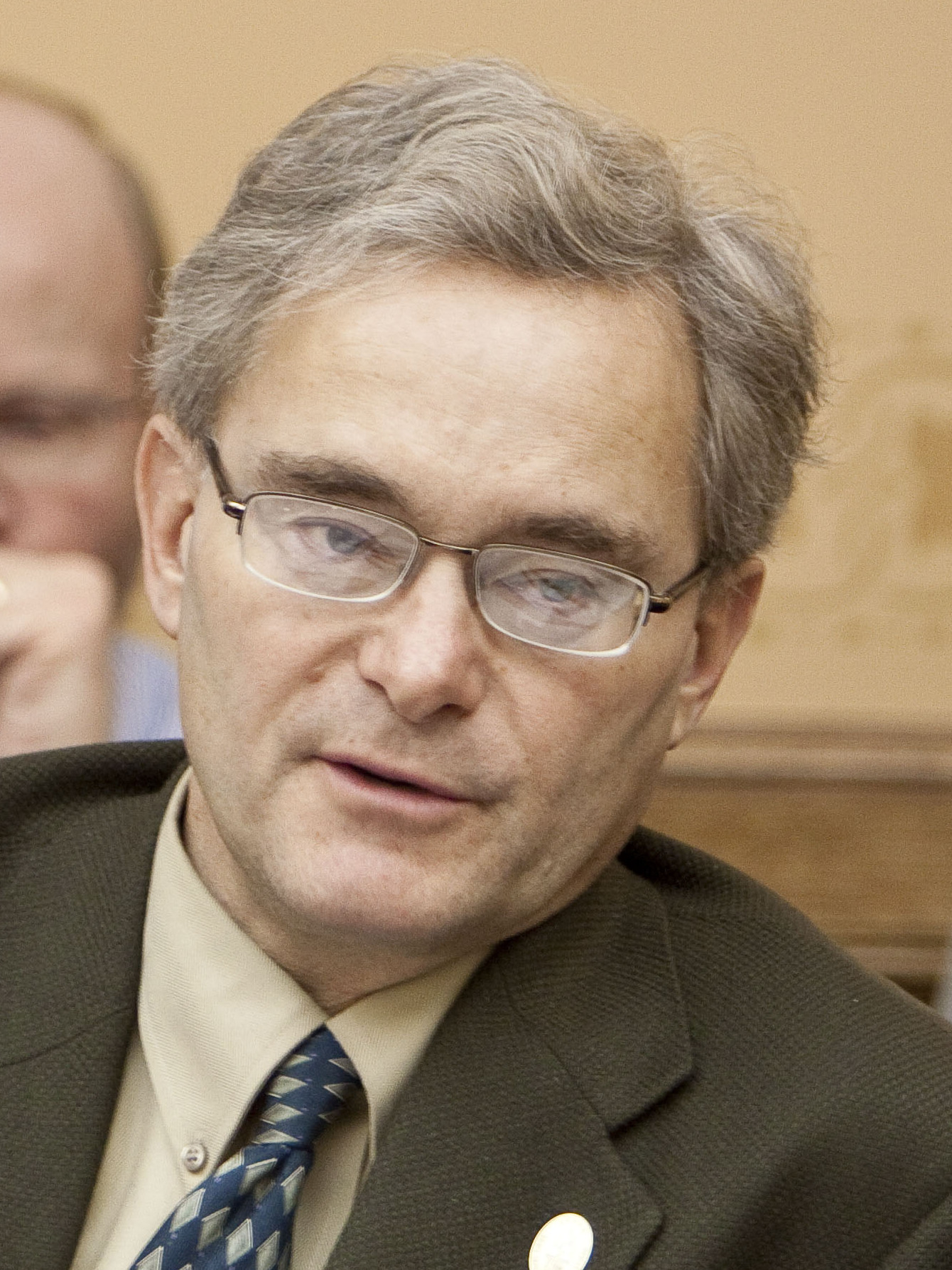
	Majority party	Minority party
Leader	Jeff Fitzgerald (retired)	Peter Barca
Party	Republican	Democratic
Leader since	January 5, 2009	January 3, 2011
Leader's seat	39th–Horicon	64th–Kenosha
Last election	60 seats, 55.01%	38 seats, 41.87%
Seats before	59	39
Seats won	60	39
Seat change	▲1	Steady
Popular vote	1,249,559	1,419,858
Percentage	46.15%	52.44%
Swing	▼8.86 pp	▲10.57 pp
	Third party
Party	Independent
Last election	1 seat, 1.69%
Seats before	1
Seats won	0
Seat change	▼1
Popular vote	28,119
Percentage	1.41%
Swing	▼0.28%
- Results: Democratic gain Republican gain Democratic hold Republican hold Vote Share: 50–60% 60–70% 70–80% >90% 40–50% 50–60% 60–70% 70–80% 80–90% >90%
Speaker before election
Jeff Fitzgerald
Republican
Elected Speaker
Robin Vos
Republican

The 2012 Wisconsin State Assembly elections were held on Tuesday, November 6, 2012. All 99 seats in the Wisconsin State Assembly were up for election. Before the election, 58 Assembly seats were held by Republicans, 38 seats were held by Democrats, 1 was held by an independent, and 2 were vacant. The primary election was held on August 14, 2012.

This was the first Assembly election after the legislative redistricting following the 2010 United States census. The maps passed into law ware widely considered one of the most severe Republican gerrymanders in U.S. history.

Republicans flipped the independent-held seat and reclaimed two vacant seats, to enter the 101st Wisconsin Legislature with 60 of 99 State Assembly seats.

Elected members took office on January 7, 2013.

== Background ==
Republicans won control of the Assembly, alongside the governorship and the State Senate, in the 2010 elections. Using their newly-gained governmental trifecta, Republicans began enacting a number of high-profile, highly controversial bills. Chief among them was Wisconsin Act 10, also known as the "Budget Repair Bill," which sought to eliminate public-sector unions and reduce the pay of public employees in a purported attempt to balance the state's budget. This sparked a heavy backlash from public employees, especially teachers, and students, who staged protests of the legislation across the state. In addition, 14 Democratic members of the Wisconsin Senate staged a walkout to Illinois to deprive the chamber of a quorum to prevent the passage of the bill. Republicans managed to pass the bill anyway the next month, but the fallout from the bill's passage led to the attempted recall of governor Scott Walker and the successful recall of multiple members of the Senate in 2011 and 2012.

In May 2011, Democrat Steve Doyle flipped an Assembly seat by winning a special election in the 94th district.

=== Redistricting ===
In the 2010 elections, Republicans won significant majorities in both houses of the Legislature and the governorship. Republicans used their majorities to pass a radical redistricting plan after the 2010 census which substantially shifted the partisan bias of the state legislative maps. It was the product of a Republican project known as REDMAP, which used new statistical and mapping software to craft the maps. The maps themselves were crafted and agreed upon in highly secretive meetings among Republican legislators, the details of which were only made public during court hearings regarding the constitutionality of the maps in 2015.

Several lawsuits were brought against the 2011 redistricting plan. A set of early challenges against the plan led to only minor alterations to two districts in the Milwaukee area, which the court ruled violated Section 2 of the Voting Rights Act by improperly diluting the population of Latinos across two districts. Later suits against the map would eventually become the Supreme Court case Whitford v. Gill.

== Results ==
Republicans maintained their large majority in the Assembly, winning 60 seats to the Democrats' 39. Republicans were aided in part by highly favorable redistricting, winning 74% of contested seats while only winning 52% of the vote in those races. Factoring in uncontested races, Republicans won 60% of seats in the Assembly despite losing the statewide popular vote by almost 175,000 votes.

Seats		Party (majority caucus shading)			Total
Seats		Democratic	Ind.	Republican	Total
Last election (2010)		38	1	60	99
Total before this election		38	1	58	97
Up for election		39	1	59	99
of which:	Incumbent retiring	8	1	6	15
of which:	Vacated	1	0	1	2
of which:	Unopposed	16	0	4	20
This election		39	0	60	99
Change from last election		▲1	▼1	Steady	
Total after this election		39	0	60	99
Change in total		▲1	▼1	▲2	

Party	Candidates	Votes			Seats	
Party	Candidates	No.	%	+/−	No.	+/−
Republican Party	77	1,249,559	46.15%	▼8.86%	60	▲1
Democratic Party	95	1,419,858	52.44%	▲10.57%	39	Steady
Independent	14	28,119	1.41%	▼0.28%	0	▼1
Write-in	N/A	9,935	0.37%		0	0
Total		2,707,471	100.00%	—	99	—
Source: Wisconsin Government Accountability Board

Popular vote
Democratic	52.44%
Republican	46.15%
Independent	1.41%

Assembly seats
Republican	60.61%
Democratic	39.39%

=== Close races ===
Seats where the margin of victory was under 10%:

1. State Assembly district 72, 0.39%
2. State Assembly district 70, 0.53%
3. State Assembly district 93, 1.62%
4. State Assembly district 75, 2.17% (gain)
5. State Assembly district 26, 2.60%
6. State Assembly district 1, 2.62%
7. State Assembly district 85, 3.23%
8. State Assembly district 50, 3.51%
9. State Assembly district 51, 3.78%
10. State Assembly district 68, 4.86%
11. State Assembly district 88, 4.93%
12. State Assembly district 62, 6.20% (gain)
13. State Assembly district 67, 6.55%
14. State Assembly district 37, 8.60% (gain)
15. State Assembly district 49, 8.54%

== Predictions ==
Source	Ranking	As of
Governing	Likely R	October 24, 2012

== Outgoing incumbents ==
=== Retiring ===
- Tamara Grigsby (D–Milwaukee), representing District 18 since 2004, did not run for re-election due to a difficult battle with cancer.
- Michelle Litjens (R–Appleton), representing District 56 since 2010, did not run for re-election.
- Dan Meyer (R–Eagle River), representing District 34 since 2000, did not run for re-election.
- Donna J. Seidel (D–Wausau), representing District 85 since 2004, did not run for re-election.
- Richard Spanbauer (R–Oshkosh), representing District 53 since 2008, did not run for re-election.
- Tony Staskunas (D–West Allis), representing District 15 since 1996, did not run for re-election.
- Robert L. Turner (D–Racine), representing District 61 since 1990, did not run for re-election due to redistricting which reshaped his district.
- Karl Van Roy (R–Howard), representing District 90 since 2002, did not run for re-election.
- Bob Ziegelbauer (I–Manitowoc), representing District 25 since 1992, did not run for re-election.

=== Seeking other office ===
- Elizabeth M. Coggs (D–Milwaukee), representing District 10 since 2010, ran for state Senate in the 6th Senate district, but lost the primary.
- David Cullen (D–Milwaukee), representing District 13 since 1990, was elected to the Milwaukee County Board of Supervisors in the 2014 Spring election.
- Jeff Fitzgerald (R–Horicon), representing District 39 since 2000, and the incumbent speaker, ran for U.S. Senate, but lost the primary.
- Louis Molepske (D–Stevens Point), representing District 71 since 2003, ran for Portage County district attorney, and won the election.
- Mark Pocan (D–Madison), representing District 78 since 1998, ran for U.S. House of Representatives in Wisconsin's 2nd congressional district, and won the election.
- Tom Tiffany (R–Hazelhurst), representing District 35 since 2010, ran for state Senate in the 12th Senate district, and won the election.

=== Vacated ===
- Jerry Petrowski (R–Marathon) resigned from District 86 after his election as state senator.
- Barbara Toles (D–Milwaukee) resigned from District 17 on July 2, 2012.

== Election results ==
Dist.	Incumbent				This race
Dist.	Member	Party	First elect	Status	Candidates
01	Garey Bies	Republican	2000	Incumbent re-elected	✓ Garey Bies (Rep.) 51.27%; Patrick Veeser (Dem.) 48.65%
02	André Jacque	Republican	2010	Incumbent re-elected	✓ André Jacque (Rep.) 58.62%; Larry Pruess (Dem.) 41.29%
03	Alvin Ott	Republican	1986	Incumbent re-elected	✓ Alvin Ott (Rep.) 57.98%; Kole Oswald (Dem.) 38.01%; Josh Young (Ind.) 3.97%
04	Chad Weininger	Republican	2010	Incumbent re-elected	✓ Chad Weininger (Rep.) 55.58%; Michael J. Macheski (Dem.) 44.28%
05	Jim Steineke	Republican	2010	Incumbent re-elected	✓ Jim Steineke (Rep.) 55.86%; Jeff McCabe (Dem.) 44.05%
06	Gary Tauchen	Republican	2006	Incumbent re-elected	✓ Gary Tauchen (Rep.) 59.41%; John Powers (Dem.) 40.48%
07	Peggy Krusick	Democratic	1983 (special)	Incumbent lost renomination New member elected Democratic hold	✓ Daniel Riemer (Dem.) 85.35%; Peggy Krusick (Dem. write-in) 12.8%
08	Jocasta Zamarripa	Democratic	2010	Incumbent re-elected	✓ Jocasta Zamarripa (Dem.) 98.26%
09	Josh Zepnick	Democratic	2002	Incumbent re-elected	✓ Josh Zepnick (Dem.) 98.6%
10	Elizabeth M. Coggs	Democratic	2010	Incumbent retired to run for Wisconsin Senate; New member elected Democratic hold	✓ Sandy Pasch (Dem.) 98.71%
11	Jason Fields	Democratic	2004	Incumbent lost renomination New member elected Democratic hold	✓ Mandela Barnes (Dem.) 98.79%
12	Fred Kessler	Democratic	1960; 1962 (retired); 1964; 1972 (retired); 2004	Incumbent re-elected	✓ Fred Kessler (Dem.) 98.59%
13	David Cullen	Democratic	1990 (special)	Incumbent ran for Milwaukee county board. New member elected Republican gain	✓ Rob Hutton (Rep.) 60.49%; John Pokrandt (Dem.) 39.38%
14	Dale Kooyenga	Republican	2010	Incumbent re-elected	✓ Dale Kooyenga (Rep.) 59.07%; Chris Rockwood (Dem.) 40.81%
15	Tony Staskunas	Democratic	1996	Incumbent retired New member elected Republican gain	✓ Joe Sanfelippo (Rep.) 58.28%; Cindy Moore (Dem.) 41.61%
16	Leon Young	Democratic	1992	Incumbent re-elected	✓ Leon Young (Dem.) 98.78%
17	--Vacant (Note: Incumbent Barbara Toles (D) vacated her office on July 2, 2012)--			Previous incumbent resigned Jul. 2, 2012. New member elected Democratic hold	✓ La Tonya Johnson (Dem.) 84.73%; Anthony R. Edwards (Ind.) 14.92%
18	Tamara Grigsby	Democratic	2004	Incumbent retired New member elected Democratic hold	✓ Evan Goyke (Dem.) 87.93%; Melba Morris-Page (Ind.) 11.56%
19	Jon Richards	Democratic	1998	Incumbent re-elected	✓ Jon Richards (Dem.) 97.65%
20	Christine Sinicki	Democratic	1998	Incumbent re-elected	✓ Christine M. Sinicki (Dem.) 57.52%; Molly McGartland (Rep.) 42.31%
21	Mark Honadel	Republican	2003 (special)	Incumbent re-elected	✓ Mark Honadel (Rep.) 59.28%; William R. Kurtz (Dem.) 40.61%
22	Sandy Pasch	Democratic	2008	Ran for the 10th district New member elected Republican gain	✓ Don Pridemore (Rep.) 98.56%
22	Don Pridemore (Note: Redistricted from the 99th district.)	Republican	2004	Incumbent re-elected	✓ Don Pridemore (Rep.) 98.56%
23	Jim Ott	Republican	2006	Incumbent re-elected	✓ Jim Ott (Rep.) 62.20%; Cris Rogers (Dem.) 37.73%
24	Dan Knodl	Republican	2008	Incumbent re-elected	✓ Dan Knodl (Rep.) 62.37%; Shan Haqqi (Dem.) 37.53%
25	Bob Ziegelbauer	Independent	1992 (Note: First elected as a Democrat)	Incumbent retired New member elected Republican gain	✓ Paul Tittl (Rep.) 57.56%; Jim Brey (Dem.) 42.22%
26	Mike Endsley	Republican	2010	Incumbent re-elected	✓ Mike Endsley (Rep.) 51.27%; Mike Helmke (Dem.) 48.67%
27	Steve Kestell	Republican	1998	Incumbent re-elected	✓ Steve Kestell (Rep.) 57.89%; Steven H. Bauer (Dem.) 42.05%
28	Erik Severson	Republican	2010	Incumbent re-elected	✓ Erik Severson (Rep.) 56.18%; Adam T. Bever (Dem.) 43.72%
29	John Murtha	Republican	2006	Incumbent re-elected	✓ John Murtha (Rep.) 55.84%; Jim Swanson (Dem.) 43.99%
30	Dean Knudson	Republican	2010	Incumbent re-elected	✓ Dean Knudson (Rep.) 55.79%; Diane Odeen (Dem.) 44.14%
31	Amy Loudenbeck (Note: Redistricted from the 45th district.)	Republican	2010	Incumbent re-elected	✓ Amy Loudenbeck (Rep.) 56.47%; Ryan J. Schroeder (Dem.) 43.41%
32	Tyler August	Republican	2010	Incumbent re-elected	✓ Tyler August (Rep.) 57.10%; Kim M. Peterson (Dem.) 39.67%; David Stolow (Ind.) 3.10%
33	Stephen Nass (Note: Redistricted from the 31st district.)	Republican	2010	Incumbent re-elected	✓ Stephen Nass (Rep.) 62.79%; Scott Allan Woods (Dem.) 34.00%; Terry Virgil (Ind.) 3.14%
34	Dan Meyer	Republican	2000	Incumbent retired New member elected Republican hold	✓ Rob Swearingen (Rep.) 57.16%; Merlin Van Buren (Dem.) 36.15%; Kevin M. Fitzpatrick (Ind.) 4.32%; Todd Albano (Ind.) 2.33%
35	Tom Tiffany	Republican	2010	Incumbent retired to run for Wisconsin Senate; New member elected Republican hold	✓ Mary Czaja (Rep.) 53.30%; Kevin Koth (Dem.) 41.83%; Patrick K. Tjugum (Ind.) 4.81%
36	Jeffrey Mursau	Republican	2004	Incumbent re-elected	✓ Jeffrey Mursau (Rep.) 59.05%; Dorothy Kegley (Dem.) 40.88%
37	None (open seat)			No incumbent. New member elected Republican gain	✓ John Jagler (Rep.) 54.16%; Mary I. Arnold (Dem.) 45.55%
38	Joel Kleefisch	Republican	2004	Incumbent re-elected	✓ Joel Kleefisch (Rep.) 58.51%; Scott Michalak (Dem.) 39.03%; Leroy L. Watson (Ind.) 2.40%
39	Jeff Fitzgerald	Republican	2000	Incumbent retired to run for U.S. Senate; New member elected Republican hold	✓ Mark Born (Rep.) 60.36%; Jim Grigg (Dem.) 39.56%
40	Kevin David Petersen	Republican	2006	Incumbent re-elected	✓ Kevin Petersen (Rep.) 98.71%
41	Joan Ballweg	Republican	2004	Incumbent re-elected	✓ Joan Ballweg (Rep.) 57.92%; Melissa Sorenson (Dem.) 42.01%
42	Keith Ripp (Note: Redistricted from the 47th district.)	Republican	2008	Incumbent re-elected	✓ Keith Ripp (Rep.) 56.58%; Paula Cooper (Dem.) 43.37%
43	Evan Wynn	Republican	2010	Incumbent defeated New member elected Democratic gain	✓ Andy Jorgensen (Dem.) 57.58%; Evan Wynn (Rep.) 42.16%
43	Andy Jorgensen	Democratic	2006	Incumbent re-elected	✓ Andy Jorgensen (Dem.) 57.58%; Evan Wynn (Rep.) 42.16%
44	Joe Knilans	Republican	2010	Incumbent defeated New member elected Democratic gain	✓ Debra Kolste (Dem.) 61.54%; Joe Knilans (Rep.) 38.30%
45	Janis Ringhand (Note: Redistricted from the 80th district.)	Democratic	2010	Incumbent re-elected New member elected Democratic gain	✓ Janis Ringhand (Dem.) 63.75%; Beth Schmidt (Rep.) 36.04%
46	Gary Hebl	Democratic	2004	Incumbent re-elected	✓ Gary Hebl (Dem.) 64.79%; Trish Schaefer (Rep.) 35.18%
47	None (open seat)			No incumbent New member elected Democratic gain	✓ Robb Kahl (Dem.) 70.87%; Sandy Bakk (Rep.) 29.02%
48	None (open seat)			No incumbent New member elected Democratic hold	✓ Melissa Sargent (Dem.) 83.20%; Terry R. Gray (Ind.) 16.55%
49	Travis Tranel	Republican	2010	Incumbent re-elected	✓ Travis Tranel (Rep.) 54.19%; Carol Beals (Dem.) 45.65%
50	Edward Brooks	Republican	2008	Incumbent re-elected	✓ Edward Brooks (Rep.) 50.30%; Sarah Ann Shanahan (Dem.) 46.78%; Ben Olson III (Ind.) 2.84%
51	Howard Marklein	Republican	2010	Incumbent re-elected	✓ Howard Marklein (Rep.) 51.85%; Maureen May-Grimm (Dem.) 48.07%
52	Jeremy Thiesfeldt	Republican	2010	Incumbent re-elected	✓ Jeremy Thiesfeldt (Rep.) 60.65%; Paul G. Czisny (Dem.) 39.31%
53	Richard Spanbauer	Republican	2008	Incumbent retired New member elected Republican hold	✓ Michael Schraa (Rep.) 60.28%; Ryan Flejter (Dem.) 39.60%
54	Gordon Hintz	Democratic	2006	Incumbent re-elected	✓ Gordon Hintz (Dem.) 59.88%; Paul J. Esslinger (Rep.) 39.90%
55	Dean Kaufert	Republican	1990	Incumbent re-elected	✓ Dean Kaufert (Rep.) 62.95%; Jim Crail (Dem.) 33.55%; Rich Martin (Ind.) 3.34%
56	Michelle Litjens	Republican	2010	Incumbent retired New member elected Republican hold	✓ Dave Murphy (Rep.) 58.29%; Richard B. Schoenbohm (Dem.) 41.62%
57	Penny Bernard Schaber	Democratic	2008	Incumbent re-elected	✓ Penny Bernard Schaber (Dem.) 94.03%; Brian Garrow (Rep. write-in) 3.16%
58	Patricia Strachota	Republican	2004	Incumbent re-elected	✓ Patricia Strachota (Rep.) 98.89%
59	Daniel LeMahieu	Republican	2002	Incumbent re-elected	✓ Daniel LeMahieu (Rep.) 99.22%
60	Duey Stroebel	Republican	2011	Incumbent re-elected	✓ Duey Stroebel (Rep.) 71.08%; Perry Duman (Dem.) 28.79%
61	Samantha Kerkman (Note: Redistricted from the 66th district.)	Republican	2000	Incumbent re-elected	✓ Samantha Kerkman (Rep.) 55.67%; John Steinbrink (Dem.) 44.25%
61	John Steinbrink (Note: Redistricted from the 65th district.)	Democratic	1996	Incumbent defeated New member elected Republican gain	✓ Samantha Kerkman (Rep.) 55.67%; John Steinbrink (Dem.) 44.25%
62	Cory Mason	Democratic	2006	Ran for the 66th district New member elected Republican gain	✓ Tom Weatherston (Rep.) 53.05%; Melissa Lemke (Dem.) 46.85%
63	Robin Vos	Republican	2004	Incumbent re-elected	✓ Robin Vos (Rep.) 58.31%; Kelley Albrecht (Dem.) 41.62%
64	Peter Barca	Democratic	1984; 1993 (retired); 2008	Incumbent re-elected	✓ Peter Barca (Dem.) 96.84%
65	None (open seat)			No incumbent New member elected Democratic hold	✓ Tod Ohnstad (Dem.) 97.99%
66	Robert L. Turner	Democratic	1990	Incumbent retired New member elected Democratic gain	✓ Cory Mason (Dem.) 98.65%
67	Tom Larson	Republican	2010	Incumbent re-elected	✓ Tom Larson (Rep.) 53.24%; Deb Bieging (Dem.) 46.69%
68	Kathy Bernier	Republican	2010	Incumbent re-elected	✓ Kathy Bernier (Rep.) 52.39%; Judy Smriga (Dem.) 47.53%
69	Scott Suder	Republican	1998	Incumbent re-elected	✓ Scott Suder (Rep.) 61.17%; Paul Knoff (Dem.) 38.74%
70	Amy Sue Vruwink	Democratic	2002	Incumbent re-elected	✓ Amy Sue Vruwink (Dem.) 50.19%; Nancy VanderMeer (Rep.) 49.65%
71	Louis Molepske	Democratic	2003 (special)	Incumbent retired to run for district attorney New member elected Democratic hold	✓ Katrina Shankland (Dem.) 60.82%; Patrick Testin (Rep.) 38.94%
72	Scott Krug	Republican	2010	Incumbent re-elected	✓ Scott Krug (Rep.) 50.16%; Justin D. Pluess (Dem.) 49.77%
73	Nick Milroy	Democratic	2008	Incumbent re-elected	✓ Nick Milroy (Dem.) 98.84%
74	Janet Bewley	Democratic	2010	Incumbent re-elected	✓ Janet Bewley (Dem.) 58.97%; John Sendra (Rep.) 40.98%
75	Roger Rivard	Republican	2010	Incumbent defeated New member elected Democratic gain	✓ Stephen J. Smith (Dem.) 51.02%; Roger Rivard (Rep.) 48.85%
76	Chris Taylor (Note: Redistricted from the 48th district)	Democratic	2011 (special)	Incumbent re-elected	✓ Chris Taylor (Dem.) 99.11%
77	Terese Berceau (Note: Redistricted from the 76th district)	Democratic	1998	Incumbent re-elected	✓ Terese Berceau (Dem.) 99.36%
78	Mark Pocan	Democratic	1998	Incumbent retired to run for U.S. House	✓ Brett Hulsey (Dem.) 75.44%; Jonathan Dedering (Ind.) 24.17%
78	Brett Hulsey (Note: Redistricted from the 77th district.)	Democratic	2010	Incumbent re-elected	✓ Brett Hulsey (Dem.) 75.44%; Jonathan Dedering (Ind.) 24.17%
79	None (open seat)			No incumbent New member elected Democratic hold	✓ Dianne Hesselbein (Dem.) 98.75%
80	Sondy Pope (Note: Redistricted from the 79th district)	Democratic	2002	Incumbent re-elected	✓ Sondy Pope (Dem.) 63.85%; Tom Lamberson (Rep.) 36.02%
81	Kelda Roys	Democratic	2008	Incumbent retired to run for U.S. House	✓ Fred Clark (Dem.) 61.83%; Scott Frostman (Rep.) 38.13%
81	Fred Clark (Note: Redistricted from the 42nd district)	Democratic	2008	Incumbent re-elected	✓ Fred Clark (Dem.) 61.83%; Scott Frostman (Rep.) 38.13%
82	Jeff Stone	Republican	1998 (special)	Incumbent re-elected	✓ Jeff Stone (Rep.) 60.16%; Kathleen Wied-Vincent (Dem.) 39.69%
83	Dave Craig	Republican	2011 (special)	Incumbent re-elected	✓ Dave Craig (Rep.) 69.75%; Jim Brownlow (Dem.) 30.18%
84	Mike Kuglitsch	Republican	2010	Incumbent re-elected	✓ Mike Kuglitsch (Rep.) 62.67%; Jesse J. Roelke (Dem.) 37.11%
85	Donna J. Seidel	Democratic	2004	Incumbent retired New member elected Democratic hold	✓ Mandy Wright (Dem.) 49.70%; Patrick Snyder (Rep.) 46.47%; Jim Maas (Ind.) 3.74%
86	--Vacant (Note: Incumbent Jerry Petrowski (R) vacated his office on July 17, 2012)--			Previous incumbent resigned Jul. 17, 2012; New member elected Republican hold	✓ John Spiros (Rep.) 55.64%; Dennis Halkoski (Dem.) 44.20%
87	Mary Williams	Republican	2002	Incumbent re-elected	✓ Mary Williams (Rep.) 58.52%; Elizabeth Riley (Dem.) 41.43%
88	John Klenke	Republican	2010	Incumbent re-elected	✓ John Klenke (Rep.) 52.40%; Ward Bacon (Dem.) 47.47%
89	John Nygren	Republican	2006	Incumbent re-elected	✓ John Nygren (Rep.) 59.05%; Joe Reinhard (Dem.) 40.87%
90	Karl Van Roy	Republican	2002	Incumbent retired New member elected Democratic gain	✓ Eric Genrich (Dem.) 60.21%; David VanderLeest (Rep.) 39.41%
91	None (open seat)			No incumbent New member elected Democratic hold	✓ Dana Wachs (Dem.) 97.28%
92	Mark Radcliffe	Democratic	2008	Incumbent retired	✓ Chris Danou (Dem.) 98.76%; Stephen J. Doerr (Rep.) 0.24%
92	Chris Danou	Democratic	2008	Incumbent re-elected	
93	Warren Petryk	Republican	2010	Incumbent re-elected	✓ Warren Petryk (Rep.) 50.78%; Jeff Smith (Dem.) 49.16%
94	Steve Doyle	Democratic	2011 (special)	Incumbent re-elected	✓ Steve Doyle (Dem.) 60.59%; Bruce Evers (Rep.) 39.38%
95	Jill Billings	Democratic	2011 (special)	Incumbent re-elected	✓ Jill Billings (Dem.) 98.89%
96	Lee Nerison	Republican	2004	Incumbent re-elected	✓ Lee Nerison (Rep.) 59.52%; Tom J. Johnson (Dem.) 40.44%
97	Bill Kramer	Republican	2006	Incumbent re-elected	✓ Bill Kramer (Rep.) 64.60%; Marga Krumins (Dem.) 35.29%
98	Paul Farrow	Republican	2010	Incumbent re-elected	✓ Paul Farrow (Rep.) 70.42%; Eric Prudent (Dem.) 29.52%
99	Chris Kapenga (Note: Redistricted from the 33rd district.)	Republican	2010	Incumbent re-elected	✓ Chris Kapenga (Rep.) 76.28%; Thomas D. Hibbard (Dem.) 23.67%

== See also ==
- 2012 Wisconsin elections
  - 2012 Wisconsin gubernatorial recall election
  - 2012 Wisconsin Senate election
  - 2012 Wisconsin Senate recall elections
  - 2012 United States House of Representatives elections in Wisconsin
  - 2012 United States Senate election in Wisconsin
- 2012 United States elections
- Wisconsin State Assembly
- Elections in Wisconsin
- Redistricting in Wisconsin
