= 2010 Wisconsin State Assembly election =

- November 2, 2010

All 99 seats in the Wisconsin State Assembly 50 seats needed for a majority
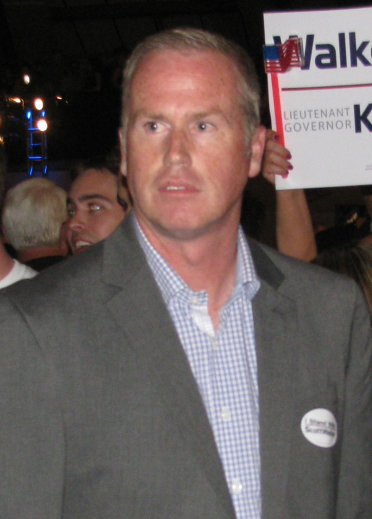

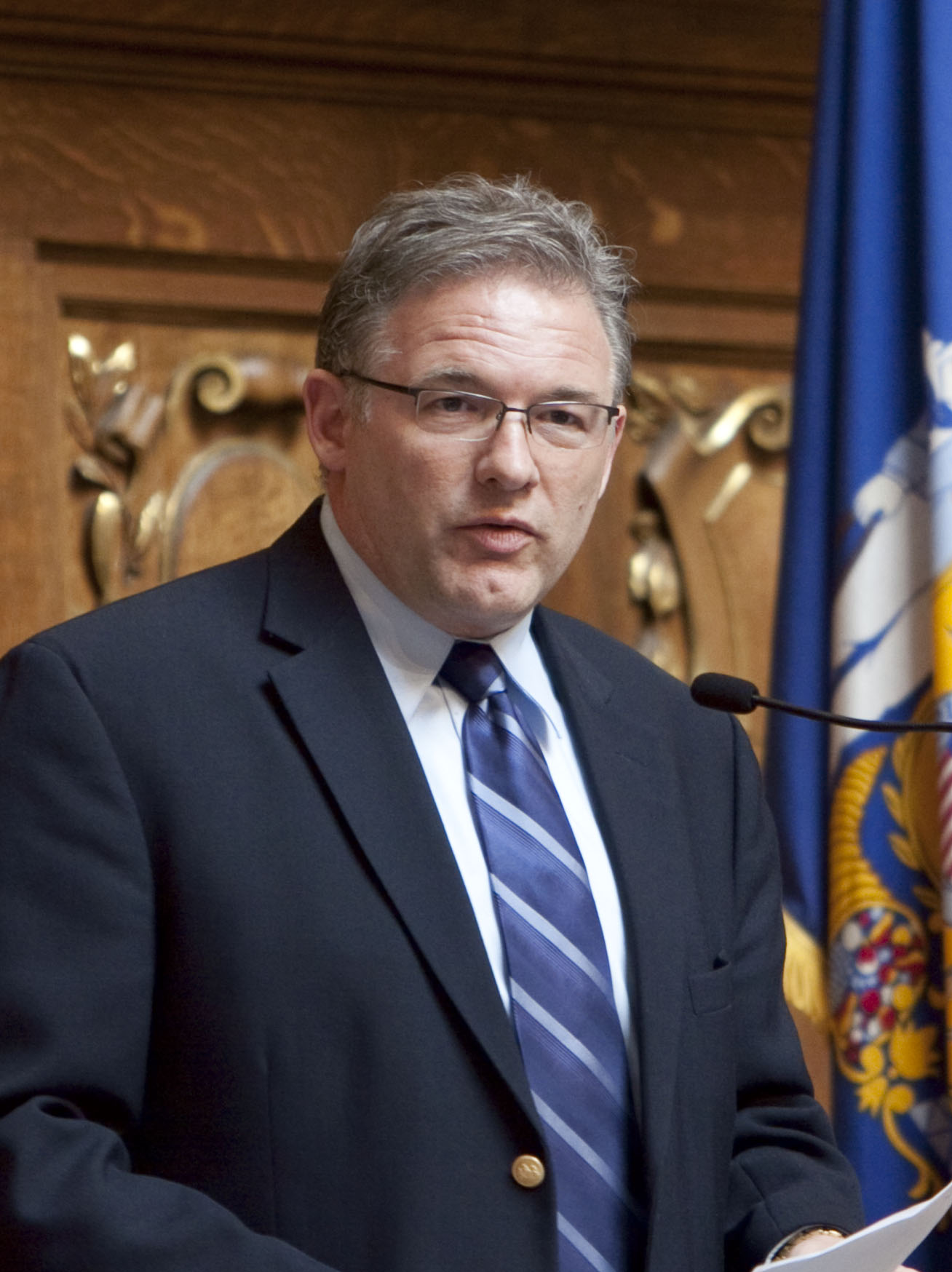
	Majority party	Minority party
Leader	Jeff Fitzgerald	Michael J. Sheridan (lost re-election)
Party	Republican	Democratic
Leader since	January 5, 2009	November 13, 2002
Leader's seat	39th–Horicon	44th–Janesville
Last election	46 seats, 43.43%	52 seats, 55.31%
Seats before	46	51
Seats won	60	38
Seat change	▲14	▼13
Popular vote	1,101,353	838,312
Percentage	55.01%	41.87%
Swing	▲11.58 pp	▼13.44 pp
	Third party
Party	Independent
Last election	1 seat, 0.97%
Seats before	2
Seats won	1
Seat change	▼1
Percentage	1.69%
Swing	▲0.72 pp
- Results: Republican hold Republican gain Democratic hold Democratic gain Independent hold
Speaker before election
Michael J. Sheridan
Democratic
Elected Speaker
Jeff Fitzgerald
Republican

The 2010 Wisconsin State Assembly elections were held on Tuesday, November 2, 2010. All 99 seats in the Wisconsin State Assembly were up for election. Before the election, 49 Assembly seats were held by Democrats, 45 seats were held by Republicans, 2 were held by independents, and 3 seats were vacant. The primary election was held on September 14, 2010.

Republicans flipped 15 seats for a net gain of 14 seats, reclaiming the Assembly majority. They were set to enter the 100th Wisconsin Legislature with 60 of 99 State Assembly seats, but three members resigned before the start of the term.

Elected members took office on January 3, 2011.

== Background ==
The Democratic Party had won control of the Assembly from the Republicans in the 2008 elections, establishing a governmental trifecta. The Republican Party heavily targeted control of the chamber through project REDMAP, desiring to control the state's redistricting process required after the 2010 census.

== Results ==
Republicans won a sizeable majority in the Assembly, 60 seats to the Democrats' 38, with one Independent. Alongside concurrent elections for the governorship and the Senate, Republicans, took over the entirety of Wisconsin's state government from the Democrats.

== Results summary ==
Seats		Party (majority caucus shading)			Total
Seats		Democratic	Ind.	Republican	Total
Last election (2008)		52	1	46	99
Total after last election (2008)		52	1	46	99
Total before this election		49	2	45	96
Up for election		51	2	46	99
of which:	Incumbent retiring	7	1	9	17
of which:	Vacated	2	0	1	3
of which:	Unopposed	8	0	14	22
This election		38	1	60	99
Change from last election		▼14	Steady	▲14	Steady
Total after this election		38	1	60	99
Change in total		▼11	▼1	▲15	Steady

Popular vote
Republican Party	55.01%
Democratic Party	41.87%
Independent	1.69%
Libertarian Party	0.54%
Green Party	0.39%
Constitution Party	0.22%

Assembly seats
Republican Party	60.61%
Democratic Party	38.38%
Independent	1.01%

=== Close races ===
Seats where the margin of victory was under 10%:

1. State Assembly district 93, 0.33% (gain)
2. State Assembly district 68, 0.43% (gain)
3. State Assembly district 26, 0.84% (gain)
4. State Assembly district 42, 1.43%
5. State Assembly district 88, 1.65% (gain)
6. State Assembly district 92, 1.72%
7. State Assembly district 15, 2.05%
8. State Assembly district 75, 2.17% (gain)
9. State Assembly district 44, 3.05% (gain)
10. State Assembly district 51, 4.29% (gain)
11. State Assembly district 37, 4.44%
12. State Assembly district 43, 5.03% (gain)
13. State Assembly district 57, 5.06%
14. State Assembly district 72, 5.24% (gain)
15. State Assembly district 80, 5.68% (gain)
16. State Assembly district 74, 6.04%
17. State Assembly district 20, 6.58%
18. State Assembly district 70, 7.58%
19. State Assembly district 45, 8.75% (gain)
20. State Assembly district 85, 9.38%
21. State Assembly district 62, 9.69%

== Outgoing incumbents ==
=== Retiring ===
- Chuck Benedict (D–Beloit), representing District 45 since 2004, did not run for re-election.
- Spencer Black (D–Madison), representing District 77 since 1984, did not run for re-election.
- Donald Friske (R–Merrill), representing District 35 since 2000, did not run for re-election.
- Steve Hilgenberg (D–Dodgeville), representing District 51 since 2006, did not run for re-election after being diagnosed with cancer.
- Mary Hubler (D–Rice Lake), representing District 75 since 1984, did not run for re-election.
- Thomas Lothian (R–Williams Bay), representing District 32 since 2002, did not run for re-election.
- Phil Montgomery (R–Green Bay), representing District 4 since 1998, did not run for re-election.
- Scott Newcomer (R–Pewaukee), representing District 33 since 2006, did not run for re-election.
- Kitty Rhoades (R–Hudson), representing District 30 since 1998, did not run for re-election.
- John Townsend (R–Fond du Lac), representing District 52 since 1998, did not run for re-election.
- Annette Polly Williams (D–Milwaukee), representing District 10 since 1992 and a member of the Assembly since 1980, did not run for re-election.
- Jeffrey Wood (I–Chippewa Falls), representing District 67 since 2002, did not run for re-election.

=== Seeking other office ===
- Brett Davis (R–Oregon), representing District 80 since 2004, ran for lieutenant governor of Wisconsin but lost in the primary.
- Tom Nelson (D–Kaukauna), representing District 5 since 2004, ran for lieutenant governor of Wisconsin but lost the general election.
- Roger Roth (R–Appleton), representing District 56 since 2006, ran for U.S. House of Representatives in Wisconsin's 8th congressional district but lost in the primary.
- Leah Vukmir (R–Wauwatosa), representing District 14 since 2002, ran for state Senate in the 5th Senate district and won the election.
- Rich Zipperer (R–Pewaukee), representing District 98 since 2006, ran for state Senate in the 33rd Senate district and won the election.

=== Vacated ===
- Pedro Colón (D–Milwaukee), representing District 8 since 1998, resigned after his appointment as a Wisconsin circuit court judge.
- Mark Gundrum (R–New Berlin), representing District 84 since 1998, resigned after his election as a Wisconsin circuit court judge.
- Gary Sherman (D–Port Wing), representing District 74 since 1998, resigned after his appointment to the Wisconsin Court of Appeals.

== Predictions ==
Source	Ranking	As of
Governing	Lean R (flip)	November 1, 2010

== Race summary ==
District	Incumbent				This race (Note: Not all totals add up to 100% due to scattering)	
District	Member	Party	First elected	Status	Candidates	Results
01	Garey Bies	Republican	2000	Ran	▌ ✓ Garey Bies (Rep.) 58.29%; ▌Richard A. Skare (Dem.) 41.65%	Incumbent re-elected
02	Ted Zigmunt	Democratic	2008	Ran	▌ ✓ André Jacque (Rep.) 62.23%; ▌Ted Zigmunt (Dem.) 47.82%	Incumbent defeated. New member elected. Republican gain.
03	Al Ott	Republican	1986	Ran	▌ ✓ Al Ott (Rep.) 96.86%; ▌Joseph W. Mueller (Ind. write-in) 2.34%	Incumbent re-elected
04	Phil Montgomery	Republican	1998	Did not run	▌ ✓ Chad Weininger (Rep.) 57.54%; ▌Sam Dunlop (Dem.) 38.56%; ▌Brad Sauer (Ind.) 3.86%	Incumbent retired. New member elected. Republican hold.
05	Tom Nelson	Democratic	2004	Ran for lieutenant governor	▌ ✓ Jim Steineke (Rep.) 57.84%; ▌Mert Summers (Dem.) 42.03%	Incumbent ran for lieutenant governor. New member elected. Republican gain.
06	Gary Tauchen	Republican	2006	Ran	▌ ✓ Gary Tauchen (Rep.) 99.45%	Incumbent re-elected
07	Peggy Krusick	Democratic	1983 (Note: Elected to the 17th district in 1983, the 24th in 1984, the 97th in 1992, and the 7th in 2002.) (special)	Ran	▌ ✓ Peggy Krusick (Dem.) 57.53%; ▌Brad Sponholz (Rep.) 42.27%	Incumbent re-elected
08	--Vacant--				▌ ✓ JoCasta Zamarripa (Dem.) 83.85%; ▌Ramona Rivas (Ind.) 13.26%; ▌Laura Manriquez (Dem. write-in) 1.76%	Incumbent resigned. New member elected. Democratic hold.
09	Josh Zepnick	Democratic	2002	Running	▌ ✓ Josh Zepnick (Dem.) 98.03%	Incumbent re-elected
10	Annette Polly Williams	Democratic	1980 (Note: Elected to the 17th district in 1980 and 1984, the 11th in 1982, and the 10th in 1992)	Did not run	▌ ✓ Elizabeth M. Coggs (Dem.) 92.55%; ▌Ieshuh Griffin (Ind.) 7.13%; ▌Sherman L. Hill (Dem. write-in) 0.03%	Incumbent retired. New member elected. Democratic hold.
11	Jason Fields	Democratic	2004	Ran	▌ ✓ Jason Fields (Dem.) 99.10%	Incumbent re-elected
12	Fred Kessler	Democratic	1960 (Note: Elected to the old Milwaukee County 10th Assembly district in 1960 and 1964–1970, elected to the 12th Assembly district since 2004) (2004)	Ran	▌ ✓ Fred Kessler (Dem.) 73.73%; ▌Sam Hagedorn (Rep.) 26.09%	Incumbent re-elected
13	David Cullen	Democratic	1990 (Note: Elected to the 14th district in 1990 and the 13th in 1992) (special)	Ran	▌ ✓ David Cullen (Dem.) 76.25%; ▌Lisa R. Becker (Con.) 23.41%	Incumbent re-elected
14	Leah Vukmir	Republican	2002 (special)	Ran for state Senate	▌ ✓ Dale Kooyenga (Rep.) 98.92%	Incumbent ran for Wisconsin Senate. New member elected. Republican hold.
15	Tony Staskunas	Democratic	1996	Ran	▌ ✓ Tony Staskunas (Dem.) 50.93%; ▌Ronald Rieboldt (Rep.) 48.89%	Incumbent re-elected
16	Leon Young	Democratic	1992	Ran	▌ ✓ Leon Young (Dem.) 98.24%	Incumbent re-elected
17	Barbara Toles	Democratic	2004 (special)	Ran	▌ ✓ Barbara Toles (Dem.) 99.00%	Incumbent re-elected
18	Tamara Grigsby	Democratic	2004	Ran	▌ ✓ Tamara Grigsby (Dem.) 98.26%	Incumbent re-elected
19	Jon Richards	Democratic	1998	Ran	▌ ✓ Jon Richards (Dem.) 68.54%; ▌Krista Burns (Rep.) 31.24%	Incumbent re-elected
20	Christine Sinicki	Democratic	1998	Ran	▌ ✓ Christine Sinicki (Dem.) 53.18%; ▌Molly M. McGartland (Rep.) 46.60%	Incumbent re-elected
21	Mark Honadel	Republican	2003 (special)	Ran	▌ ✓ Mark Honadel (Rep.) 62.60%; ▌Tom Michalski (Dem.) 37.28%	Incumbent re-elected
22	Sandy Pasch	Democratic	2008	Ran	▌ ✓ Sandy Pasch (Dem.) 62.31%; ▌Paul Pedersen (Rep.) 37.48%	Incumbent re-elected
23	Jim Ott	Republican	2006	Ran	▌ ✓ Jim Ott (Rep.) 98.24%	Incumbent re-elected
24	Dan Knodl	Republican	2008	Ran	▌ ✓ Dan Knodl (Rep.) 74.74%; ▌Dustin James Klein (Dem.) 25.21%	Incumbent re-elected
25	Bob Ziegelbauer	Independent	1992 (Note: First elected as a Democrat)	Ran	▌ ✓ Bob Ziegelbauer (Ind.) 49.77%; ▌Kerry A. Trask (Dem.) 33.13%; ▌Andrew Wisniewski (Rep.) 17.06%	Incumbent re-elected
26	Terry Van Akkeren	Democratic	2002	Ran	▌ ✓ Mike Endsley (Rep.) 48.89%; ▌Terry Van Akkeren (Dem.) 48.05%; ▌Job E. Hou-Seye (Ind.) 3.01%	Incumbent defeated. New member elected. Republican gain.
27	Steve Kestell	Republican	1998	Ran	▌ ✓ Steve Kestell (Rep.) 75.34%; ▌Jack Lechler (Ind.) 24.56%	Incumbent re-elected
28	Ann Hraychuck	Democratic	2006	Ran	▌ ✓ Erik Severson (Rep.) 57.65%; ▌Ann Hraychuck (Dem.) 42.29%	Incumbent defeated. New member elected. Republican gain.
29	John Murtha	Republican	2006	Ran	▌ ✓ John Murtha (Rep.) 62.35%; ▌Liz Jones (Dem.) 37.55%	Incumbent re-elected
30	Kitty Rhoades	Republican	1998	Did not run	▌ ✓ Dean Knudson (Rep.) 62.00%; ▌Matt Borup (Dem.) 37.88%	Incumbent retired. New member elected. Republican hold.
31	Stephen Nass	Republican	1990 (Note: Elected to the 38th district in 1990 and the 31st in 1992)	Ran	▌ ✓ Stephen Nass (Rep.) 89.29%; ▌Leryo L. Watson (Lib.) 10.52%	Incumbent re-elected
32	Thomas Lothian	Republican	2002	Did not run	▌ ✓ Tyler August (Rep.) 58.09%; ▌Doug A. Harrod (Dem.) 27.56%; ▌Daniel G. Kilkenny (Ind.) 10.60%; ▌Rick Pappas (Ind.) 3.46%	Incumbent retired. New member elected. Republican hold.
33	Scott Newcomer	Republican	2005 (special)	Did not run	▌Chris Kapenga (Rep.) 99.50%	Incumbent retired. New member elected. Republican hold.
34	Dan Meyer	Republican	1998	Ran	▌ ✓ Dan Meyer (Rep.) 59.78%; ▌Merlin Van Buren (Dem.) 30.16%; ▌Wil Losch (Lib.) 10.00%	Incumbent re-elected
35	Donald Friske	Republican	2000	Did not run	▌ ✓ Tom Tiffany (Rep.) 58.09%; ▌Jay Schmelling (Dem.) 41.81%	Incumbent retired. New member elected. Republican hold.
36	Jeffrey Mursau	Republican	2004	Ran	▌ ✓ Jeffrey Mursau (Rep.) 59.07%; ▌Anne Woznicki (Dem.) 40.90%	Incumbent re-elected
37	Andy Jorgensen	Democratic	2006	Ran	▌ ✓ Andy Jorgensen (Dem.) 52.18%; ▌Vicki L. Milbrath (Rep.) 47.74%	Incumbent re-elected
38	Joel Kleefisch	Republican	2004	Ran	▌ ✓ Joel Kleefisch (Rep.) 72.41%; ▌Dick Pas (Dem.) 27.50%	Incumbent re-elected
39	Jeff Fitzgerald	Republican	2000	Ran	▌ ✓ Jeff Fitzgerald (Rep.) 98.87%	Incumbent re-elected
40	Kevin David Petersen	Republican	2006	Ran	▌ ✓ Kevin David Petersen (Rep.) 69.13%; ▌Jon Baltmanis (Dem.) 30.81%	Incumbent re-elected
41	Joan Ballweg	Republican	2004	Ran	▌ ✓ Joan Ballweg (Rep.) 65.34%; ▌Scott Milheiser (Dem.) 25.73%; ▌Jay Selthofner (Ind.) 8.87%	Incumbent re-elected
42	Fred Clark	Democratic	2008	Ran	▌ ✓ Fred Clark (Dem.) 50.69%; ▌Jack Cummings (Rep.) 49.27%	Incumbent re-elected
43	Kim Hixson	Democratic	2006	Ran	▌ ✓ Evan Wynn (Rep.) 52.49%; ▌Kim Hixson (Dem.) 47.47%	Incumbent defeated. New member elected. Republican gain.
44	Michael J. Sheridan	Democratic	2004	Ran	▌Joe Knilans (Rep.) 51.50%; ▌Michael J. Sheridan (Dem.) 48.45%	Incumbent defeated. New member elected. Republican gain.
45	Chuck Benedict	Democratic	2004	Did not run	▌ ✓ Amy Loudenbeck (Rep.) 54.36%; ▌Roger Anclam (Dem.) 45.61%	Incumbent retired. New member elected. Republican gain.
46	Gary Hebl	Democratic	2004	Ran	▌ ✓ Gary Hebl (Dem.) 59.38%; ▌Kathy Maves (Rep.) 40.56%	Incumbent re-elected
47	Keith Ripp	Republican	2008	Ran	▌ ✓ Keith Ripp (Rep.) 57.23%; ▌Trish O'Neil (Dem.) 42.74%	Incumbent re-elected
48	Joe Parisi	Democratic	2004	Ran	▌Joe Parisi (Dem.) 72.49%; ▌Spencer Zimmerman (Rep.) 24.33%; ▌Grant J. Gilbertson (Ind.) 3.13%	Incumbent re-elected
49	Phil Garthwaite	Democratic	2006	Ran	▌ ✓ Travis Tranel (Rep.) 56.92%; ▌Phil Garthwaite (Dem.) 42.99%	Incumbent defeated. New member elected. Republican gain.
50	Ed Brooks	Republican	2008	Ran	▌ ✓ Ed Brooks (Rep.) 60.24%; ▌Sarah Ann Shanahan (Dem.) 37.44%; ▌Ben Olson III (Ind.) 37.44%	Incumbent re-elected
51	Steve Hilgenberg	Democratic	2006	Did not run	▌ ✓ Howard Marklein (Rep.) 52.13%; ▌John Simonson (Dem.) 47.84%	Incumbent retired. New member elected. Republican gain.
52	John Townsend	Republican	1998	Did not run	▌ ✓ Jeremy Thiesfeldt (Rep.) 62.90%; ▌Paul G. Czisny (Dem.) 36.98%	Incumbent retired. New member elected. Republican hold.
53	Richard Spanbauer	Republican	2008	Ran	▌ ✓ Richard Spanbauer (Rep.) 99.45%	Incumbent re-elected
54	Gordon Hintz	Democratic	2006	Ran	▌ ✓ Gordon Hintz (Dem.) 57.16%; ▌Jonathan Krause (Rep.) 42.75%	Incumbent re-elected
55	Dean Kaufert	Republican	1991	Ran	▌ ✓ Dean Kaufert (Rep.) 98.79%	Incumbent re-elected
56	Roger Roth	Republican	2006	Ran for U.S. House	▌ ✓ Michelle Litjens (Rep.) 99.52%	Incumbent ran for U.S. House. New member elected. Republican hold.
57	Penny Bernard Schaber	Democratic	2008	Ran	▌ ✓ Penny Bernard Schaber (Dem.) 52.44%; ▌Chris Hanson (Rep.) 47.38%	Incumbent re-elected
58	Patricia Strachota	Republican	2004	Ran	▌ ✓ Patricia Strachota (Rep.) 99.37%	Incumbent re-elected
59	Daniel LeMahieu	Republican	2002	Ran	▌ ✓ Daniel LeMahieu (Rep.) 99.36%	Incumbent re-elected
60	Mark Gottlieb	Republican	2002	Ran	▌ ✓ Mark Gottlieb (Rep.) 99.23%	Incumbent re-elected
61	Robert L. Turner	Democratic	1990	Ran	▌ ✓ Robert L. Turner (Dem.) 81.96%; ▌George Meyers (Lib.) 17.71%	Incumbent re-elected
62	Cory Mason	Democratic	2006	Ran	▌ ✓ Cory Mason (Dem.) 53.78%; ▌Chris Wright (Rep.) 44.10%; ▌Tony Decubellis (Lib.) 2.07%	Incumbent re-elected
63	Robin Vos	Republican	2004	Ran	▌ ✓ Robin Vos (Rep.) 99.35%	Incumbent re-elected
64	Peter Barca	Democratic	1984 (2008)	Ran	▌ ✓ Peter Barca (Dem.) 84.17%; ▌ Daane Hoffman (Lib.) 15.45%	Incumbent re-elected
65	John Steinbrink	Democratic	1996	Ran	▌ ✓ John Steinbrink (Dem.) 96.63%	Incumbent re-elected
66	Samantha Kerkman	Republican	2000	Ran	▌ ✓ Samantha Kerkman (Rep.) 69.73%; ▌Steven M. Brown (Dem.) 30.22%	Incumbent re-elected
67	Jeffrey Wood	Independent	2002 (Note: First elected as a Republican)	Did not run	▌ ✓ Tom Larson (Rep.) 62.58%; ▌C. W. King (Dem.) 32.51%; ▌Thomas Lange (Ind.) 4.83%	Incumbent retired. New member elected. Republican gain.
68	Kristen Dexter	Democratic	2008	Ran	▌ ✓ Kathy Bernier (Rep.) 50.15%; ▌Kristen Dexter (Dem.) 49.73%	Incumbent defeated. New member elected. Republican gain.
69	Scott Suder	Republican	1998	Ran	▌ ✓ Scott Suder (Rep.) 99.14%	Incumbent re-elected
70	Amy Sue Vruwink	Democratic	2002	Ran	▌ ✓ Amy Sue Vruwink (Dem.) 53.75%; ▌John Spiros (Rep.) 46.17%	Incumbent re-elected
71	Louis Molepske	Democratic	2003 (special)	Ran	▌ ✓ Louis Molepske (Dem.) 56.93%; ▌Bob Scovill (Rep.) 42.92%	Incumbent re-elected
72	Marlin Schneider	Democratic	1970 (Note: Elected to Wood County's 2nd district in 1970, the 59th district in 1972, the 59th district in 1982, and the 72nd in 1984)	Ran	▌ ✓ Scott Krug (Rep.) 46.56%; ▌Marlin Schneider (Dem.) 41.32%; ▌Thad Kubisiak (Ind.) 12.08%	Incumbent defeated. New member elected. Republican gain.
73	Nick Milroy	Democratic	2008	Ran	▌ ✓ Nick Milroy (Dem.) 56.18%; ▌Bonnie Baker (Rep.) 43.77%	Incumbent re-elected
74	--Vacant--				▌ ✓ Janet Bewley (Dem.) 52.99%; ▌Shirl LaBarre (Rep.) 46.95%	Incumbent resigned. New member elected. Democratic hold.
75	Mary Hubler	Democratic	1984	Did not run	▌ ✓ Roger Rivard (Rep.) 50.98%; ▌Steve Perala (Dem.) 48.85%; ▌John Schiess (Ind. write-in) 0.04%	Incumbent retired. New member elected. Republican gain.
76	Terese Berceau	Democratic	1998	Ran	▌ ✓ Terese Berceau (Dem.) 81.64%; ▌Torrey Jaeckle (Ind.) 18.15%	Incumbent re-elected
77	Spencer Black	Democratic	1984	Did not run	▌ ✓ Brett Hulsey (Dem.) 48.62%; ▌Ben Manski (Grn.) 31.08%; ▌David Redick (Rep.) 18.70%; ▌David K. Olson (Con.) 1.49%	Incumbent retired. New member elected. Democratic hold.
78	Mark Pocan	Democratic	1998	Ran	▌ ✓ Mark Pocan (Dem.) 98.94%	Incumbent re-elected
79	Sondy Pope	Democratic	2002	Ran	▌ ✓ Sondy Pope (Dem.) 58.98%; ▌Tom Clauder (Rep.) 40.95%	Incumbent re-elected
80	Brett Davis	Republican	2004	Ran for lieutenant governor	▌ ✓ Janis Ringhand (Dem.) 52.77%; ▌Don Henke (Rep.) 47.09%	Incumbent ran for lieutenant governor. New member elected. Democratic gain.
81	Kelda Roys	Democratic	2008	Ran	▌ ✓ Kelda Roys (Dem.) 98.90%	Incumbent re-elected
82	Jeff Stone	Republican	1998 (special)	Ran	▌ ✓ Jeff Stone (Rep.) 98.87%	Incumbent re-elected
83	Scott Gunderson	Republican	1994	Ran	▌ ✓ Scott Gunderson (Rep.) 78.69%; ▌Aaron Robertson (Dem.) 21.28%	Incumbent re-elected
84	--Vacant--				▌ ✓ Mike Kuglitsch (Rep.) 73.72%; ▌Don Vanpool (Dem.) 26.22%	Incumbent resigned. New member elected. Republican hold.
85	Donna Seidel	Democratic	2004	Ran	▌ ✓ Donna Seidel (Dem.) 52.53%; ▌Charles R. Eno (Rep.) 43.15%; ▌Jim Maas (Lib.) 4.23%	Incumbent re-elected
86	Jerry Petrowski	Republican	1998	Ran	▌ ✓ Jerry Petrowski (Rep.) 66.82%; ▌Todd Punke (Dem.) 28.96%; ▌Frederick Melms (Ind.) 4.18%	Incumbent re-elected
87	Mary Williams	Republican	2002	Ran	▌ ✓ Mary Williams (Rep.) 56.80%; ▌Dana Schultz (Dem.) 40.02%; ▌Frank Rutherford (Ind.) 3.15%	Incumbent re-elected
88	James Soletski	Democratic	2006	Ran	▌ ✓ John Klenke (Rep.) 50.74%; ▌James Soletski (Dem.) 49.09%	Incumbent defeated. New member elected. Republican gain.
89	John Nygren	Republican	2006	Ran	▌ ✓ John Nygren (Rep.) 67.68%; ▌Bob Orwig (Dem.) 32.24%	Incumbent re-elected
90	Karl Van Roy	Republican	2002	Ran	▌ ✓ Karl Van Roy (Rep.) 58.42%; ▌Lou Ann Weix (Dem.) 41.51%	Incumbent re-elected
91	Chris Danou	Democratic	2008	Ran	▌ ✓ Chris Danou (Dem.) 58.70%; ▌Bill Ingram (Rep.) 41.28%	Incumbent re-elected
92	Mark A. Radcliffe	Democratic	2008	Ran	▌ ✓ Mark A. Radcliffe (Dem.) 50.80%; ▌Dennis Clinard (Rep.) 49.08%	Incumbent re-elected
93	Jeff Smith	Democratic	2006	Ran	▌ ✓ Warren Petryk (Rep.) 50.12%; ▌Jeff Smith (Dem.) 49.79%	Incumbent defeated. New member elected. Republican gain.
94	Michael Huebsch	Republican	1994	Ran	▌ ✓ Michael Huebsch (Rep.) 58.85%; ▌Cheryl Hancock (Dem.) 41.12%	Incumbent re-elected
95	Jennifer Shilling	Democratic	2000	Ran	▌Jennifer Shilling (Dem.) 63.53%; ▌Nick Charles (Rep.) 36.27%	Incumbent re-elected
96	Lee Nerison	Republican	2004	Ran	▌ ✓ Lee Nerison (Rep.) 61.13%; ▌Brian K. Murphy (Dem.) 38.85%	Incumbent re-elected
97	Bill Kramer	Republican	2006	Ran	▌ ✓ Bill Kramer (Rep.) 67.46%; ▌Dawn M. Caruss (Dem.) 32.48%	Incumbent re-elected
98	Rich Zipperer	Republican	2006	Ran for state Senate	▌ ✓ Paul Farrow (Rep.) 76.57%; ▌Victor Weers (Dem.) 23.37%	Incumbent ran for Wisconsin Senate. New member elected. Republican hold.
99	Don Pridemore	Republican	2004	Ran	▌Don Pridemore (Rep.) 77.33%; ▌Tom Hibbard (Dem.) 22.55%	Incumbent re-elected

== See also ==
- 2010 Wisconsin elections
  - 2010 Wisconsin gubernatorial election
  - 2010 Wisconsin Senate election
  - 2010 United States Senate election in Wisconsin
  - 2010 United States House of Representatives elections in Wisconsin
- 2010 United States elections
- Wisconsin State Assembly
- Elections in Wisconsin
- Redistricting in Wisconsin
