= Wisconsin's 75th Assembly district =

American legislative district in northwest Wisconsin

Wisconsin's 75th State Assembly district
- 2024 map defined in 2023 Wisc. Act 94; 2022 map defined in Johnson v. Wisconsin Elections Commission; 2011 map was defined in 2011 Wisc. Act 43
Assemblymember
Duke Tucker; R–Grantsburg
since January 6, 2025 (1 years)
- Demographics: 93.48% White; 0.62% Black; 1.54% Hispanic; 0.58% Asian; 2.93% Native American; 0.09% Hawaiian/Pacific Islander
- Population (2020) • Voting age: 60,058; 47,930
- Website: Official website
- Notes: Northwest Wisconsin

The 75th Assembly district of Wisconsin is one of 99 districts in the Wisconsin State Assembly. Located in northwestern Wisconsin, the district comprises all of Polk County and most of Burnett County. It includes the cities of Amery and St. Croix Falls and the villages of Balsam Lake, Centuria, Clayton, Clear Lake, Dresser, Frederic, Grantsburg, Luck, Milltown, Osceola, Siren, and Webster, and part of the village of Turtle Lake. The district also contains the St. Croix Chippewa reservation, the Wisconsin portion of Interstate Park, and a significant portion of the Wisconsin side of the Saint Croix National Scenic Riverway. The district has been represented by Republican Duke Tucker, since January 2025.

The 75th Assembly district is located within Wisconsin's 25th Senate district, along with the 73rd and 74th Assembly districts.

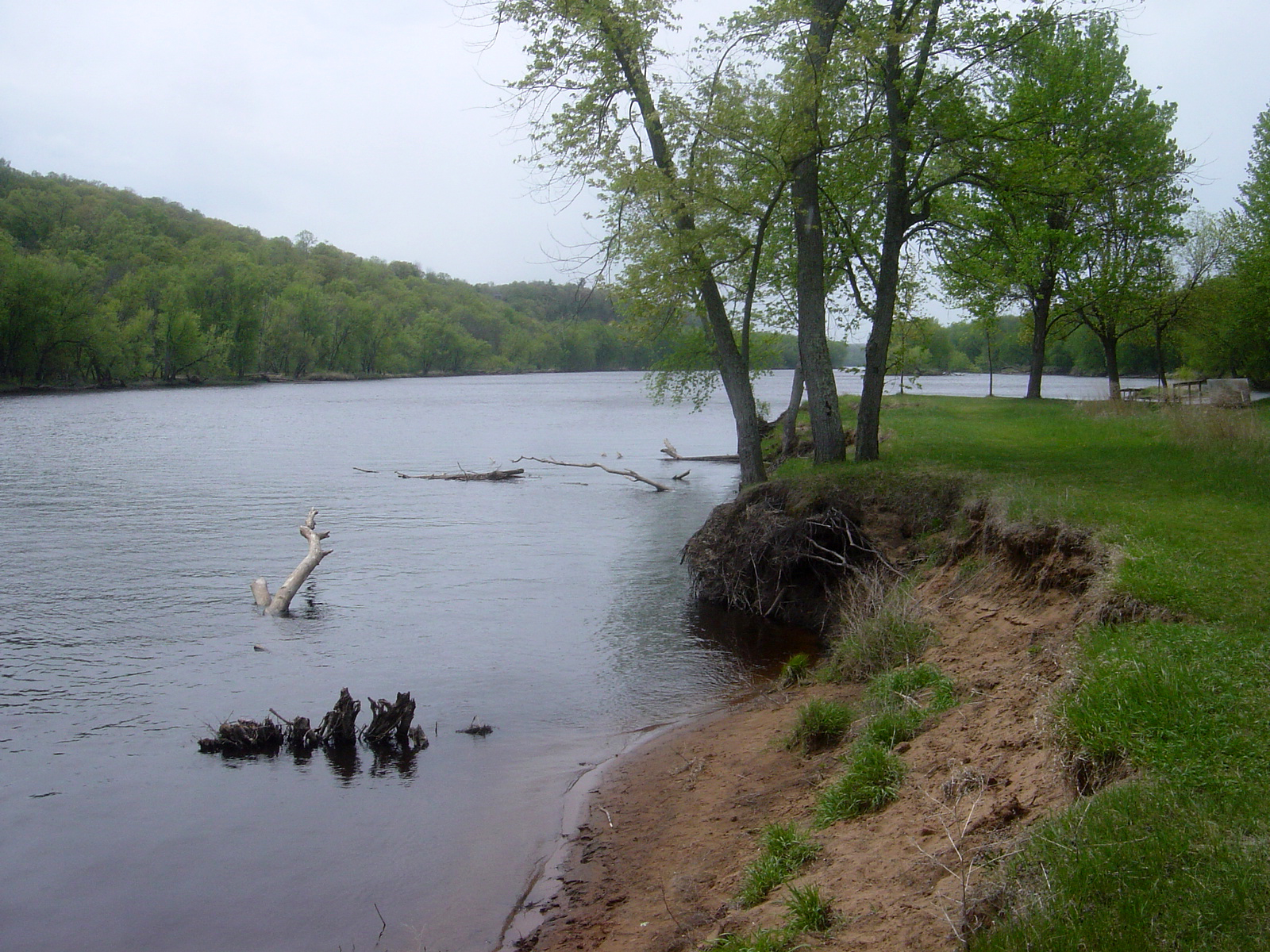
Saint Croix National Scenic Riverway near Osceola, Wisconsin

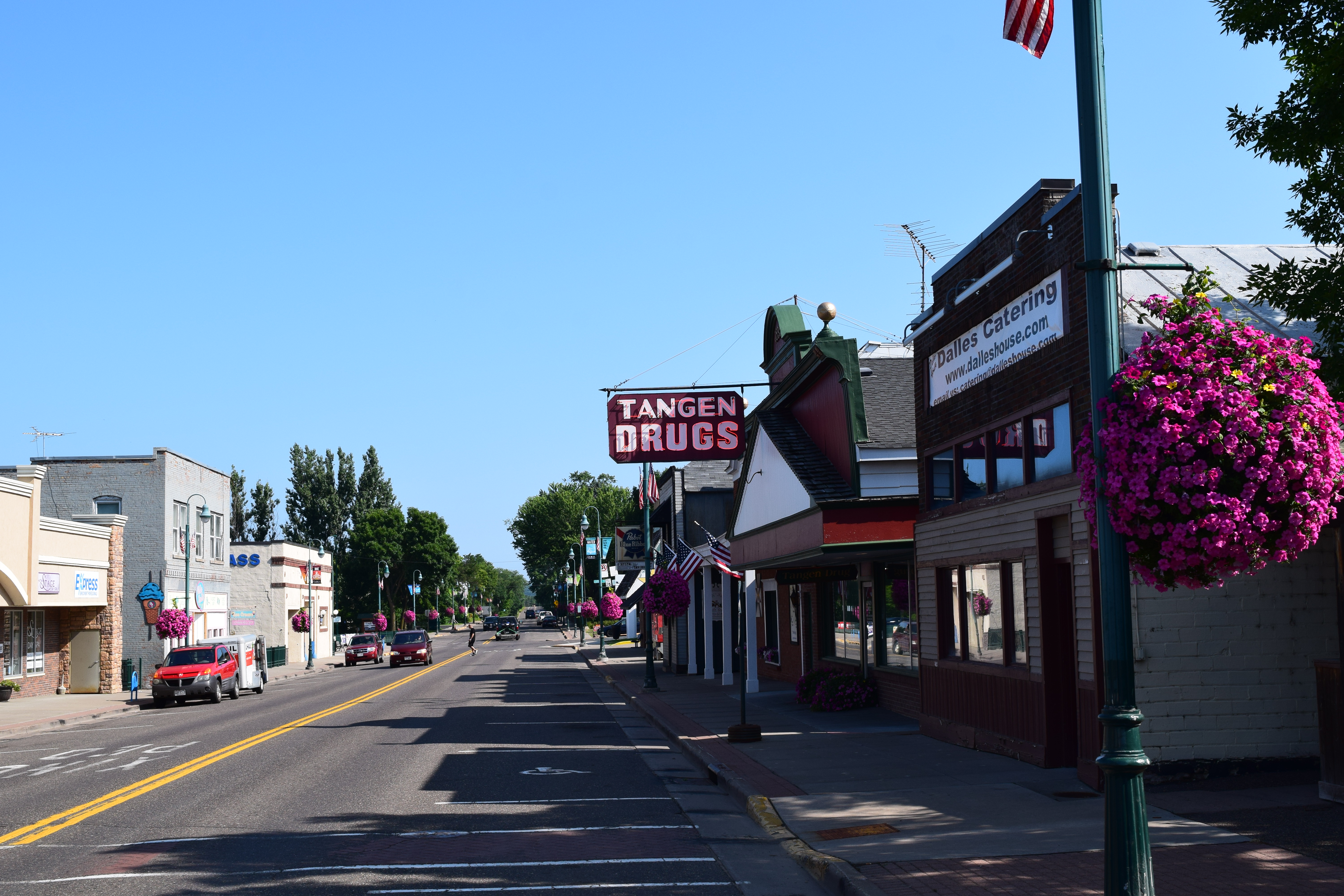
downtown St. Croix Falls

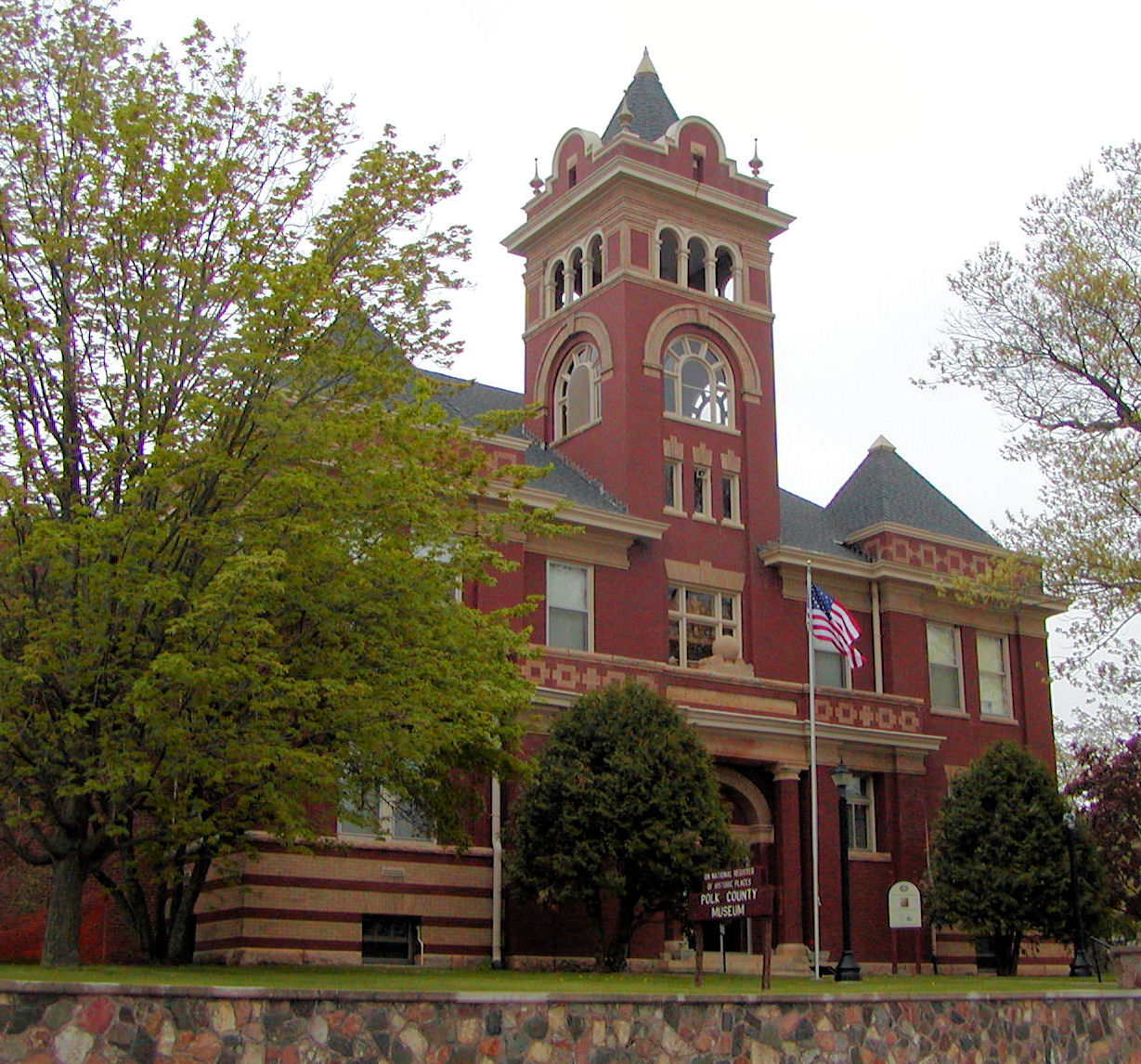
Polk County Courthouse

== List of past representatives ==
List of representatives to the Wisconsin State Assembly from the 75th district
Member	Party	Residence	Counties represented	Term start	Term end	Ref.
District created
Kenneth M. Schricker	Rep.	Spooner	Barron, Sawyer, Washburn	January 1, 1973	March 1, 1978	
--Vacant--			Barron, Sawyer, Washburn	March 1, 1978	January 1, 1979	
Patricia Spafford Smith	Dem.	Rice Lake	Barron, Sawyer, Washburn	January 1, 1979	January 3, 1983	
Robert Cowles	Rep.	Green Bay	Brown	January 3, 1983	January 7, 1985	
Mary Hubler	Dem.	Rice Lake	Barron, Washburn	January 7, 1985	January 3, 2011	
Mary Hubler	Dem.	Rice Lake	Barron, Polk, Washburn	January 7, 1985	January 3, 2011	
Roger Rivard	Rep.	Rice Lake	Barron, Polk, Washburn	January 3, 2011	January 7, 2013	
Stephen J. Smith	Dem.	Shell Lake	Barron, Burnett, Dunn, Polk, St. Croix, Washburn	January 7, 2013	January 5, 2015	
Romaine Quinn	Rep.	Barron	Barron, Burnett, Dunn, Polk, St. Croix, Washburn	January 5, 2015	January 4, 2021	
David Armstrong	Rep.	Rice Lake	Barron, Burnett, Dunn, Polk, St. Croix, Washburn	January 4, 2021	January 6, 2025	
David Armstrong	Rep.	Rice Lake	Barron, Washburn	January 4, 2021	January 6, 2025	
Duke Tucker	Rep.	Grantsburg	Burnett, Polk	January 6, 2025	Current	

== Electoral history ==
Year	Date	Elected				Defeated				Total	Plurality	Other primary candidates
2010	Nov. 2	Roger Rivard	Republican	9,950	50.98%	Steve Perala	Dem.	9,535	48.85%	19,518	415	Judith Wells Espeseth (Rep.); Don Quinton (Rep.); Dari McDonald (Rep.)
2010	Nov. 2	Roger Rivard	Republican	9,950	50.98%	John Schiess (write-in)	Rep.	8	0.04%	19,518	415	Judith Wells Espeseth (Rep.); Don Quinton (Rep.); Dari McDonald (Rep.)
2012	Nov. 6	Stephen Smith	Democratic	14,456	51.02%	Roger Rivard (inc)	Rep.	13,841	48.85%	28,334	615	
2024	Nov. 5	Duke Tucker	Republican	24,642	66.71%	Jane Kleiss	Dem.	12,298	33.29%	36,940	12,344	Jay Calhoun (Rep.); Neil Kline (Rep.)
