= Patricia Spafford Smith =

American politician

Patricia A. Spafford-Smith

Member of the Wisconsin State Assembly
- In office January 3, 1983 – January 7, 1985
- Preceded by: Joseph E. Tregoning
- Succeeded by: Joseph E. Tregoning
- Constituency: 51st district
- In office January 1, 1979 – January 3, 1983
- Preceded by: Kenneth M. Schricker
- Succeeded by: Robert Cowles
- Constituency: 75th district

Personal details
- Born: Patricia Spafford; August 17, 1925 Shell Lake, Wisconsin
- Died: December 31, 2002 (aged 77)
- Party: Democratic
- Spouse: James W. Smith (m. 1949; died 1969)
- Children: 6 (including Stephen J. Smith)
- Education: University of Wisconsin-Superior, University of Minnesota (BBA)

Patricia A. Spafford Smith (August 17, 1925 – December 31, 2002) was an American businesswoman and Democratic politician from Shell Lake, Wisconsin.

== Background ==
Born Patricia A. Spafford in Shell Lake on August 17, 1925, Smith attended Superior State Teachers College (now University of Wisconsin–Superior) and graduated from the University of Minnesota with a BBA in 1946; she also later attended the Barron County branch, as well as the main campus, of the University of Wisconsin–Eau Claire. After graduation, Smith worked as an accountant for the Wisconsin Department of Revenue, and later ran a school bus contracting business (she was on the board of directors of the Wisconsin School Bus Association). At the time of her first election to public office, she had a record of leadership in organizations including Wisconsin Citizens Concerned for Life, Barron County Sports Center, Barron Co. Health Forum, Barron County Adult 4-H Leaders Association, Boy Scouts and Girl Scouts, and the Barron County Democratic Party.

== Public office ==
She was first elected to the Wisconsin State Assembly's 75th district in 1978; she won a plurality in a five-way Democratic primary, then defeated Republican Glenn A. Johnson, with 8,344 votes to his 7,661. (Previous incumbent Kenneth M. Schricker had died in office.) She was narrowly re-elected in 1980; after a recount, she had 12,840 votes to 12,671 for Republican Alan Sykes. In 1982, in what was now numbered the 51st district, she had less trouble, polling 8,870 to 7,735 for Republican Ole Severude. In 1984, with the district once again numbered the 75th, she was not a candidate, and was succeeded by fellow Democrat Mary Hubler (who had defeated a Patrick T. Smith in the Democratic primary).

After she left the Assembly, Smith served on the Washburn County, Wisconsin Board of Supervisors, the Shell Lake Common Council and served as Mayor of Shell Lake.

== Personal life ==
She married James W. Smith on October 22, 1949; he died in 1969, leaving her a widow with six children. She died December 31, 2002. Ten years later, her son Stephen J. Smith (also a business owner and accountant) was elected to the Wisconsin State Assembly as a Democrat to represent the same district his mother had represented.
