= Erik Severson =

American politician (born 1974)

Erik Severson M.D.

Member-elect of the Wisconsin Senate from the 25th district
- Assuming office January 4, 2027
- Succeeding: Romaine Quinn

Member of the Wisconsin State Assembly from the 28th district
- In office January 3, 2011 – January 3, 2015
- Preceded by: Ann Hraychuck
- Succeeded by: Adam Jarchow

Personal details
- Born: February 3, 1974 (age 52) Duluth, Minnesota, U.S.
- Party: Republican
- Spouse: Katie Otto
- Children: 3
- Education: University of Minnesota Duluth; Mayo Medical School (M.D.)
- Profession: Physician, politician
- Website: Campaign website

Erik Arlen Severson (born February 3, 1974) is an American physician and Republican politician from Polk County, Wisconsin. He is a member-elect of the Wisconsin Senate, and will represent Wisconsin's 25th Senate district in the 108th Wisconsin Legislature (2027–2028). He previously served two terms in the Wisconsin State Assembly, representing Wisconsin's 28th Assembly district from 2011 to 2015.

== Early life and education ==
Erik Severson was born in Duluth, Minnesota, and raised in the Duluth area, graduating from Esko High School in 1992. He took college courses while attending high school and earned his bachelor's degree early from the University of Minnesota Duluth in 1993. He went on to study at Mayo Medical School, and earned his medical doctorate in 2002. After obtaining his M.D., he took an internship at the University of North Dakota, then worked a family medicine residency at the University of Minnesota.

He was employed as a family medicine physician at Osceola Medical Center in Osceola, Wisconsin, in 2005. He has remained with Osceola Medical Center up to the present time, working in family and emergency medicine.

== Political career ==
Severson made his first run for public office in 2010, running as a Republican for Wisconsin State Assembly in the 28th Assembly district. At the time, the 28th district comprised most of Polk County, as well as parts of northwest St. Croix County and southwest Burnett County. Severson received 57% of the vote in the Republican wave election, defeating Democratic incumbent Ann Hraychuck. He was re-elected by a similar margin in 2012.

During his two terms in the Assembly, Severson served on the Assembly committee on health, and was chairman of the committee during the 2013–2014 term. During that term, he also chaired the speaker's special taskforce on mental health. In the latter capacity, he helped to author a series of bipartisan proposals to increase mental health resources in response to recent mass shootings in the United States—and, in particular, the Sandy Hook Elementary School shooting of December 2012.

In the spring of 2014, Severson announced he would not run for a third term.

Severson largely stayed out of political affairs for the next decade, until the fall of 2025, when he announced that he would seek election to the Wisconsin Senate in 2026 in the 25th Senate district. The incumbent in the seat is Republican state senator Romaine Quinn, but it will be an open seat in 2026 due to Quinn's decision to run instead in the neighboring 23rd district after the 2024 redistricting. Severson faced a competitive primary election against former state representative Angie Sapik. Sapik, who served as a Republican presidential elector in 2024, was more closely aligned with the current leadership of the Wisconsin Republican Party, whereas Severson's messaging refers back to the actions and policies that he was a part of during the Scott Walker years. Severson defeated Sapik on the August 11th primary, 54%-46% by a margin of just under 2,000 votes. He faced Democrat Charly Ray in the November general election, in a race that could have likely decided control of the Wisconsin State Senate. He defeated Ray 53%-47%, by a margin of just under 5,000 votes, and will be sworn in on January 4, 2027.

== Personal life and family ==
Severson and his wife, Katie, have three children and reside in the town of Alden, Wisconsin.

== Electoral history ==
=== Wisconsin Assembly (2010, 2012) ===
Year	Election	Date	Elected				Defeated				Total	Plurality
2010	General	Nov. 2	Erik Severson	Republican	11,770	57.65%	Ann Hraychuck (inc)	Dem.	8,634	42.29%	20,415	3,136
2012	General	Nov. 6	Erik Severson (inc)	Republican	15,865	56.18%	Adam T. Bever	Dem.	12,347	43.72%	28,241	3,518

=== Wisconsin Senate (2026) ===
Year	Election	Date	Elected				Defeated				Total	Plurality
2026	Primary	Aug. 11	Erik Severson	Republican	13,220	53.88%	Angie Sapik	Rep.	11,302	46.06%	24,536	1,918
2026	General	Nov. 3	Erik Severson	Republican	45,820	52.78%	Charly Ray	Dem.	40,987	47.22%	86,807	4,833

Wisconsin State Assembly
Preceded by Ann Hraychuck	Member of the Wisconsin State Assembly from the 28th district January 3, 2011 – January 3, 2015	Succeeded by Adam Jarchow
