= Howard W. Cameron =

American lawyer and politician

Howard W. Cameron (April 3, 1915 – March 13, 1986) was an American lawyer and politician who served as a member of the Wisconsin State Senate from Rice Lake.

== Life and career ==
Cameron was born in Chippewa Falls, Wisconsin in April 1915. He graduated from the University of Wisconsin-Superior and the University of Wisconsin Law School and became a lawyer. Additionally, he chaired the local chapter of the International Red Cross and Red Crescent Movement.

Cameron was a member of the Senate from 1959 to 1962. Later, he was a candidate for the Wisconsin State Assembly in 1974, losing to Kenneth M. Schricker. He was a Democrat. He died in March 1986 at the age of 70.
