= Robert Goetsch =

American politician (1933–2021)

Robert George Goetsch (August 5, 1933 – June 22, 2021) was an American politician who was a member of the Wisconsin State Assembly.

== Life and career ==
Goetsch was born in Juneau, Wisconsin on August 5, 1933. He would attend Wayland Junior College and the University of Wisconsin-Madison and serve in the United States Army. Goetsch is a widower with two children.

Goetsch was first elected to the Assembly in 1982. He remained a member until 2001. Goetsch was succeeded by Jeff Fitzgerald, who later became Speaker of the Assembly. Additionally, he was a member of the Oak Grove, Dodge County, Wisconsin Town Board from 1971 to 1983, serving as chairman from 1975 to 1983, and of the Dodge County, Wisconsin Board from 1972 to 1984. Goetsch was a Republican.

Goetsch died at his residence in Oak Grove, Wisconsin, on June 22, 2021, at the age of 87.
