= Duke Tucker =

21st century American politician

Member of the Wisconsin State Assembly from the 75th district
- Incumbent
- Assumed office January 6, 2025
- Preceded by: David Armstrong

Personal details
- Born: Kevin Dale Tucker; September 12, 1970 (age 55) St. Croix Falls, Wisconsin, U.S.
- Party: Republican
- Spouse: Roxanne McKenzie
- Children: 2
- Website: State Assembly website Campaign website

Military service
- Allegiance: United States
- Branch/service: United States Air Force
- Years of service: 1989–1992

Kevin Dale "Duke" Tucker (born September 1970) is an American communications technology professional and Republican politician from Burnett County, Wisconsin. He is a member of the Wisconsin State Assembly, representing Wisconsin's 75th Assembly district since 2025. He is also a member of the Burnett County Board of Supervisors, since 2024.

== Early life and career ==
Duke Tucker was born in St. Croix Falls, Wisconsin, on September 12, 1970, and raised in the farming community of Trade Lake, Wisconsin, in Burnett County. After graduating from high school, he enlisted in the United States Air Force, and served for four years, from 1988 until 1992. His military career included service as a combat communications specialist supporting the Gulf War.

After being discharged from the Air Force, he worked for four years in Eau Claire, Wisconsin, installing voice and data communications networks from 1992 to 1996. He subsequently worked for Grantsburg Telcom, in Grantsburg, Wisconsin, for 28 years as the Operations Manager.

In 2022 Tucker was elected to the Wisconsin Conservation Congress as a delegate from Burnett County.

== Political career ==
Duke Tucker made his first run for elected office in 2024, running for an open seat on the Burnett County Board of Supervisors. He was elected without opposition in April 2024. Before that election occurred, however, Tucker announced he would also be a candidate for Wisconsin State Assembly that fall, running in the 75th Assembly district. The 75th district had been significantly affected by the 2024 redistricting act, which drew the previous incumbent, David Armstrong, out of the district. Drawn into the district was 28th district incumbent Gae Magnafici, who then announced she would not run for re-election. The district was safely Republican, and Tucker faced two opponents in the Republican Party primary. He won the primary with nearly 50% of the vote, and went on to win the general election with nearly 67%. He took office in January 2025.

In June 2025, Tucker proposed an amendment to the Wisconsin Constitution to establish 8-year term limits for the state's constitutional offices and state legislature. The resolution would have to pass in two successive state legislative sessions before being put to a statewide vote to be added to the state constitution.

== Personal life and family ==
Duke Tucker is one of two children born to Larry Dale Tucker and his wife Patsy Lee (née Richter).

Duke Tucker married Roxanne McKenzie. They have two adult children and two grandchildren and reside in the town of Grantsburg, Wisconsin.

== Electoral history ==
=== Wisconsin Assembly (2024) ===
Year	Election	Date	Elected				Defeated				Total	Plurality
2024	Primary	Aug. 13	Duke Tucker	Republican	4,161	49.91%	Jay Calhoun	Rep.	2,543	26.28%	8,337	1,618
2024	Primary	Aug. 13	Duke Tucker	Republican	4,161	49.91%	Neil Kline	Rep.	1,633	19.59%	8,337	1,618
2024	General	Nov. 5	Duke Tucker	Republican	24,642	66.71%	Jane Kleiss	Dem.	12,298	33.29%	36,940	12,344
