= Romaine Quinn =

American politician (born 1990)

Member of the Wisconsin Senate
- Assuming office January 2027
- Succeeding: Jesse James
- Constituency: 23rd district
- Incumbent
- Assumed office January 3, 2023
- Preceded by: Janet Bewley
- Constituency: 25th district

Member of the Wisconsin State Assembly from the 75th district
- In office January 3, 2015 – January 4, 2021
- Preceded by: Stephen Smith
- Succeeded by: David Armstrong

Personal details
- Born: Romaine Robert Quinn; July 30, 1990 (age 36) Rice Lake, Wisconsin, U.S.
- Party: Republican
- Spouse: Rachel
- Children: 3
- Education: University of Wisconsin, Barron County; University of Wisconsin, Green Bay (BA)
- Website: State Senate website Campaign website

Romaine Robert Quinn (born July 30, 1990) is an American Republican politician from Birchwood, Wisconsin. He is member of the Wisconsin Senate, representing Wisconsin's 25th State Senate district since January 2023; he has been elected to represent the 23rd Senate district in the 108th Wisconsin Legislature (2027–2028). He was previously mayor of Rice Lake, Wisconsin, and served three terms in the Wisconsin State Assembly (2015–2021) representing the 75th Assembly district.

== Early life and education ==
Quinn was born in Rice Lake, Wisconsin on July 30, 1990. During his childhood, he attended St. Joseph Catholic School and later graduated from Rice Lake High School in 2009. Following his graduation he began attending University of Wisconsin–Barron County. In 2012, Quinn began attending the University of Wisconsin–Green Bay, where he received his bachelor's degree in political science and public leadership in May 2014. During his time in college Quinn was a Coca-Cola salesman.

== Political career ==
During Quinn's senior year of high school he was elected to the Rice Lake City Council for a single term, serving from 2009–2010. In 2010, Quinn became the youngest mayor for the city when he was elected at 19 years old, defeating incumbent mayor Daniel Fitzgerald. In 2012 Quinn declined to seek re-election as mayor as he would be attending the University of Wisconsin–Green Bay to pursue a bachelor's degree. Shortly after graduating in 2014, Quinn launched a campaign for state assembly, challenging incumbent Democrat Stephen J. Smith. Quinn defeated Smith by a 9 point margin.

In 2015, Quinn, alongside representative Bob Gannon, co-sponsored an amendment to the state constitution to institute term-limits. From 2017–2019, Quinn was the Assembly majority caucus vice chair for the Republican Party. Quinn was re-elected in 2016 and 2018 with 62% of the vote each time. In March 2020, Quinn announced he would not run for re-election to the Wisconsin State Assembly.

In 2019, following the resignation of U.S. Representative Sean Duffy, Quinn expressed interest in running in the special election for this seat, but later declined to run, endorsing state senator Tom Tiffany in the primary election.

After his service in the state assembly Quinn became a licensed realtor.

In October 2021 Quinn announced a campaign for Wisconsin's 25th senate district, then held by Democrat Janet Bewley. During the campaign, Quinn expressed support for using the budget surplus to cut taxes in the state. The race also came into focus as it would determine whether Republicans would enter the 106th Wisconsin Legislature with a supermajority in the state senate. Additionally, Quinn outraised his opponent, Kelly Westlund, by around $140,000. On election day, Quinn defeated Westlund by a 14 point margin, securing Republicans a veto-proof majority in the state senate going into the 106th legislature.

Quinn took office on January 3, 2023.

In 2024, Quinn and fellow Republican Treig Pronschinske authored legislation that would have removed the ability of local governments to enact certain regulations for animal welfare on farms.

In 2025, Quinn and fellow Republican Chanz Green authored legislation which would remove restrictions on Superior Water & Light Company from utilizing funds for replacing lead service lines used in the city of Superior, Wisconsin. The bill was signed into law by governor Tony Evers.

== Personal life ==
Quinn resides in Birchwood, Wisconsin with his wife Rachel and their three kids.

== Electoral history ==
=== Wisconsin Assembly (2014–2018) ===
Year	Election	Date	Elected				Defeated				Total	Plurality
2014	Primary	Aug. 12	Romaine Robert Quinn	Republican	2,231	64.84%	Ken Mandley	Rep.	1,208	35.11%	3,441	1,023
2014	General	Nov. 4	Romaine Robert Quinn	Republican	11,730	54.86%	Stephen Smith (inc)	Dem.	9,643	45.10%	21,382	2,087
2016	General	Nov. 8	Romaine Robert Quinn (inc)	Republican	17,786	62.00%	Joe Huftel	Dem.	10,894	37.97%	28,689	6,892
2018	General	Nov. 6	Romaine Robert Quinn (inc)	Republican	14,925	62.18%	Ali Holzman	Dem.	9,078	37.82%	24,004	5,847

=== Wisconsin Senate, 25th district (2022) ===
Year	Election	Date	Elected				Defeated				Total	Plurality
2022	General	Nov. 8	Romaine Robert Quinn	Republican	47,293	56.99%	Kelly Westlund	Dem.	35,652	42.96%	82,984	11,641

=== Wisconsin Senate, 23rd district (2026) ===
Year	Election	Date	Elected				Defeated				Total	Plurality
2026	General	Nov. 3	Romaine Robert Quinn	Republican	48,648	65.09%	Jeff Foster	Dem.	26,087	34.91%	74,735	22,561

Wisconsin State Assembly
Preceded by Stephen Smith	Member of the Wisconsin State Assembly from the 75th district January 3, 2015 – January 4, 2021	Succeeded by David Armstrong
Wisconsin Senate
Preceded by Janet Bewley	Member of the Wisconsin Senate from the 25th district January 3, 2023 – present	Incumbent
