= Jeffrey Wood =

American politician (born 1969)

Member of the Wisconsin State Assembly from the 67th district
- In office January 6, 2003 – January 3, 2011
- Preceded by: Tom Sykora
- Succeeded by: Tom Larson

Personal details
- Born: September 12, 1969 (age 57) Juneau, Wisconsin, U.S.
- Party: Republican (until 2008), Independent (2008–2013)
- Children: 2
- Education: University of Wisconsin–Eau Claire
- Occupation: Businessman, politician

Military service
- Allegiance: United States of America
- Branch/service: United States Navy, United States Navy Reserve
- Years of service: 1986-1994

Jeffrey Wood (born September 12, 1969 in Juneau, Wisconsin) Is an American Independent and former Republican politician. He was a member of the Wisconsin State Assembly representing the 67th district from 2003 to 2011. He was first elected as a Republican and later was elected as an independent.

== Biography ==
Wood attended University of Wisconsin–Eau Claire in Eau Claire, Wisconsin. He is married and has two children.

== Political career ==
=== State Assembly ===
Wood was first elected to the state assembly in 2002, to succeed retiring representative Tom Sykora in the 67th district. In 2008, Wood became the first Independent elected to the Wisconsin legislature since 1932.

In December 2008 Wood was arrested on suspicion of drunk driving. Following an accident in which his car reportedly became airborne, and marijuana was found in his vehicle, his blood alcohol content was more than double the legal limit.

In September 2009, Wood voted with the rest of the state assembly in approving a set of bills that would institute tougher penalties for drunk driving. The following week, he was again arrested of driving while under the influence.

In October 2009, Wood was arrested again in Tomah, Wisconsin for operating while intoxicated and charged with bail jumping. He was convicted on April 19, 2010 of operating while intoxicated and possession of drug paraphernalia and sentenced to 45 days in jail with over $1,600 in fines.

Following his fourth arrest, State Representative Stephen Nass proposed a resolution to expel Wood from the Assembly if he did not resign. Wood responded that he would seek treatment for his substance abuse problem.

Due to Wood's various legal troubles, a special committee was created on October 27 to address and recommend any possible disciplinary measures against him. Comprising the committee was chairwoman Mary Hubler (D–Rice Lake), Tony Staskunas (D–West Allis), Gary Hebl (D–Sun Prairie), Mark Gundrum (R–New Berlin), Rich Zipperer (R–Pewaukee), and Joan Ballweg (R–Markesan). During the course of the committee's work they offered two substitute amendments, one for censure and the other for expulsion. Ultimately, the committee deadlocked on a tie-vote and did not recommend any punishment for Wood. In justifying the decision, Hubler stated that conduct which had occurred prior to the election of a member to the state legislature would not be considered in taking disciplinary actions against said member. Additionally, Huber stated that she felt Wood should be held accountable by his constituents, who would have been able to recall him from office if they wanted.

The amendment to expel him narrowly failed, garnering 49 votes in favor of tabling it, and 48 votes against. In response, a new amendment was put forward to censure Wood instead of expelling him, and the vote passed by a wide margin of 73 votes to 24.

Vote to table amendment on expulsion
Party	Yes	No	Not voting
Democratic	46	4	2
Republican	2	44	—N/a
Independent	1	—N/a	—N/a
Percentage	50.5%	49.5%	—N/a
Total votes	✓ 49	48	2

Vote to censure Representative Jeffery Wood
Party	Yes	No	Not voting
Democratic	41	9	2
Republican	32	14	—N/a
Independent	—N/a	1	—N/a
Percentage	75.3%	24.7%	—N/a
Total votes	✓ 73	24	2

Due to his various DUI offenses, Wood announced he would not seek re-election.

Following the end of his term, on January 12, 2011, Wood pleaded no contest to a fifth-offense operation charge, a felony, and a misdemeanor bail jumping charge (which was later dropped). He was sentenced to spend nine months in jail, with three years' probation.

== Electoral history ==
=== Wisconsin Assembly (2002–2008) ===
Year	Election	Date	Elected				Defeated				Total	Plurality
2002	Primary	Sep. 10	Jeffrey Wood	Republican	1,596	72.45%	Troy Thomas	Rep.	369	16.75%	2,203	1,227
2002	Primary	Sep. 10	Jeffrey Wood	Republican	1,596	72.45%	Steve Lowrie	Rep.	238	10.80%	2,203	1,227
2002	General	Nov. 5	Jeffrey Wood	Republican	10,793	61.22%	Paul Gordon	Dem.	6,809	38.62%	17,631	3,984
2004	General	Nov. 2	Jeff Wood (inc)	Republican	15,333	52.96%	Jeff W. Monette	Dem.	11,983	41.39%	28,954	3,350
2004	General	Nov. 2	Jeff Wood (inc)	Republican	15,333	52.96%	Jan Morrow	Ind.	1,635	5.65%	28,954	3,350
2006	General	Nov. 7	Jeff Wood (inc)	Republican	11,269	54.00%	Roberta Rasmus	Dem.	9,597	45.98%	20,870	1,672
2008	General	Nov. 4	Jeff Wood (inc)	Independent	12,393	50.28%	Don Moga	Rep.	12,215	49.55%	24,650	178

Preceded by Tom Sykora	Wisconsin State Representative - 67th District; 2002 – 2011	Succeeded by Tom Larson
