= David Armstrong (Wisconsin politician) =

American politician (born 1961)

Dave Armstrong

Member of the Wisconsin State Assembly
- Incumbent
- Assumed office January 6, 2025
- Preceded by: Rob Summerfield
- Constituency: 67th district
- In office January 4, 2021 – January 6, 2025
- Preceded by: Romaine Quinn
- Succeeded by: Duke Tucker
- Constituency: 75th district

Member of the City Council of Rice Lake, Wisconsin
- In office April 2009 – April 2013

Personal details
- Born: October 3, 1961 (age 64) St. Paul, Minnesota, U.S.
- Party: Republican
- Spouse: Janell Goettl
- Children: 4
- Occupation: politician
- Website: Official website; Campaign website

David Bruce Armstrong (born October 3, 1961) is an American businessman and Republican politician from Barron County, Wisconsin. He is a member of the Wisconsin State Assembly, representing Wisconsin's 67th Assembly district since 2025; he previously represented the 75th Assembly district from 2021 to 2025. Earlier, he served as a member of the city council of Rice Lake, Wisconsin.

== Early career ==
Armstrong was active in the substance abuse testing industry, working as a vice president at Healthcomp Evaluation Services Corporation and then ClinNet Solutions. The latter was acquired by ADP in 2004. Armstrong's autobiographical website further states that he was the founder of two other health-related companies earlier in his career, both of which were acquired.

== Political career ==
=== Rice Lake (2009–2013) ===
In 2009, Armstrong was elected to the Rice Lake city council, ultimately serving until 2013. Also in 2009, he joined the board of the Rice Lake Cable Commission, where he served until 2020. While on the City Council, in 2010, he was appointed to the board of the Barron County Economic Development Corporation and was chosen as executive director of the organization in 2012—a position he still holds. He also currently serves on the Rice Lake Utilities Commission, since 2015.

=== State Assembly ===
In March 2020, incumbent assemblymember Romaine Quinn announced he would not seek a fourth term in the Wisconsin State Assembly. Within days, Armstrong announced he would be a candidate for the Republican nomination to replace Quinn in the 75th assembly district. Armstrong did not face an opponent in the Republican primary and went on to face Democrat John C. Ellenson, a former Wisconsin Badgers basketball player, in the November general election.

Armstrong ran into significant controversy in September 2020 when a review of his Twitter feed found that he had been posting and retweeting messages from the QAnon conspiracy theory. When asked about it, Armstrong did not disavow the conspiracy and instead said that he finds the core claims "interesting" but not necessarily credible though this view was misreported. A further review found what the Democratic Party of Wisconsin described as years of racism, misogyny, religious bigotry, and conspiracy theories in his feed. In the days just after the 2015 Charleston church shooting, he posted a series of supposedly racist tweets, including one featuring a snippet of Ku Klux Klan leader David Duke. Armstrong was also apparently outraged by subsequent bipartisan vote in Congress to ban the Confederate flag, as he then promised to stop donating to the Republican Party as punishment for their act. Reacting to the outrage in 2020 over the David Duke video, Armstrong apologized and stated that he didn't know where he found the Public Television video, hadn't watched the full video, and absolutely was not a supporter of the KKK. The tweets and Facebook posts were compiled by the Democratic Party of Wisconsin in an attack webpage, called The Real Dave Armstrong. Despite the controversy, Armstrong won the election with 62.33% of the vote—a higher percentage that his predecessor had achieved in the 2018 election.

On Wednesday, June 22, 2022, Governor Evers’ called for a Special Session to defend reproductive rights in Wisconsin to introduce and pass AB 713 and AB 106, which would have protected the right for women to have a say over their bodies. Despite the fact that there is a bipartisan support for legal access to abortion from both Wisconsin Democrats and Republicans, David Armstrong and other Republicans in the Legislature gaveled in and gaveled out at the special session without protecting women's rights and leaving 1.3 million Wisconsin women of reproductive age without rights to their own bodies.

== Personal life and family ==
Dave Armstrong and his wife Janell reside in Rice Lake, Wisconsin. They have four adult children and several grandchildren.

Armstrong has been involved with many volunteer organizations in Rice Lake and Barron County. He was president of the Humane Society of Barron County, after serving as co-president from 2009. He was vice president of a local anti-poverty nonprofit organization known as Community Connections to Prosperity from 2016 to 2019. He was a board member of Wisconsin Voices for Recovery, a nonprofit for anti-addiction services. He was President of the Law Enforcement Foundation of Barron County until 2020 and a board member of the Barron County Historical Society until 2021.

== Electoral history ==
=== Wisconsin Assembly, 75th district (2020, 2022) ===
Year	Election	Date	Elected				Defeated				Total	Plurality
2020	General	Nov. 3	David Armstrong	Republican	20,108	62.33%	John C. Ellenson	Dem.	12,141	37.64%	32,258	7,967
2022	General	Nov. 8	David Armstrong (inc)	Republican	20,730	96.56%	--Unopposed--				21,469	19,991

=== Wisconsin Assembly, 67th district (2024) ===
Year	Election	Date	Elected				Defeated				Total	Plurality
2024	Primary	Aug. 13	David Armstrong	Republican	5,655	77.96%	Jimmy Swenson	Rep.	1,589	21.91%	7,254	4,066
2024	General	Nov. 5	David Armstrong	Republican	23,049	67.63%	Jeff Foster	Dem.	11,021	32.34%	34,083	12,028

Wisconsin State Assembly
Preceded by Romaine Quinn	Member of the Wisconsin State Assembly from the 75th district January 4, 2021 – January 6, 2025	Succeeded by Duke Tucker
Preceded by Rob Summerfield	Member of the Wisconsin State Assembly from the 67th district January 6, 2025 – present	Incumbent
