= Roger Rivard =

American politician

Member of the Wisconsin State Assembly from the 75th district
- In office January 3, 2011 – January 3, 2013
- Preceded by: Mary Hubler
- Succeeded by: Stephen Smith

Personal details
- Born: August 27, 1952 (age 74) Rice Lake, Wisconsin
- Party: Republican
- Spouse: Berni
- Children: 4 daughters, 2 sons
- Education: Rice Lake High School; Univ. of Wisconsin-Barron Co (attended)
- Profession: Real Estate Broker-Developer
- Website: Roger Rivard 75th Assembly District

Roger Rivard (born August 27, 1952) is a former member of the Wisconsin State Assembly, representing northwest Wisconsin's 75th Assembly District from January 3, 2011, to January 3, 2013. A lifelong resident of Rice Lake, Wisconsin, Rivard was the first Republican to hold the office in 32 years.

== Early life and career ==
Rivard was born in Rice Lake, Wisconsin and is one of the seven children of Eileen Rivard, a schoolteacher, and Wilfred Rivard, the owner and operator of Rivard's Dairy Bar. Beginning at a young age, Roger worked in the family business.

He received his diploma from Rice Lake High School in 1970 and attended the Barron County branch campus of the University of Wisconsin–Eau Claire. He married and started his first business at age 19. He began selling recreational vehicles, owning and operating Rivard's Campers. Before entering politics, he was working as a real estate sales agent, broker and developer.

He is a member of the Diocese of Superior Pastoral Council. Previously, he was president of the Rice Lake Chamber of Commerce, state director of the Wisconsin Realtors Association and grand knight of the Knights of Columbus.

== Wisconsin State Representative ==
Rivard represented the 75th Assembly District which includes most of Barron County, the southern third of Washburn County and three townships in Polk County.

Elected in November 2010 to fill a seat that had been occupied by Democrats for the previous 32 years, Rivard became one of 27 first-term Assembly Republicans; a group that comprised more than 40 percent of the new Republican majority. Shortly after the election, Rivard told the Associated Press, "We understand that we've got the power in numbers but .... [w]e're not going to go down there and push everybody around. That would be foolishness. But we are going to hold everyone's feet to the fire and control government spending." Rivard was given the following Assembly committee assignments: Natural Resources (vice chairperson); Housing; Rural Economic Development and Rural Affairs.

As a freshman lawmaker, Rivard co-sponsored legislation to allow the public to hunt and trap gray wolves in Wisconsin. The bill was supported by several hunting groups, but opposed by wolf scientists who claimed it went too far and would result in a wolf population reduction from as many as 1,000 animals to as few as 350. Rivard disagreed with the numbers estimates and said the purpose of the bill was to secure the wolves' future in Wisconsin. He also co-sponsored and helped introduce legislation to reform mining laws, including one law that would streamline the permitting process for iron mining that he said would create thousands of jobs and bring billions in economic activity to northern Wisconsin. The bill, which was criticized as weakening state mining regulations and as possibly authored by a mining corporation, passed the Assembly but was voted down by the Senate. Four months into his tenure, Rivard's first bill—to increase the number of rural economic development zones—passed the Assembly, and soon passed the Senate. He has said the new law has resulted in an aircraft plant moving to Superior, Wisconsin, bringing 600 jobs to the state and he announced on October 10, 2012, that a company soon would be moving between 75 and 80 jobs back from China to Rice Lake.

In March 2011, Rivard voted in favor of Governor Walker's budget fix bill that ended most of the bargaining rights of public unions in Wisconsin. For his vote, he reportedly was threatened with boycotts of his real estate business, which he called "government by intimidation". Rivard later voted for Walker's 2011-2013 budget, which reduced funds to public schools, the state university system, technical colleges and local governments. Regarding his votes in support of the budget bills, Rivard said, "I knew it was going to be rough, because - apparently - we went down this (spending) road for many, many years and they didn't have the courage to do it".

=== 2012 campaign ===
Rivard became the subject of controversy and national media attention in October 2012 due to comments he made in December 2011 to The Chetek Alert, a small, northwestern Wisconsin newspaper. In the interview, Rivard discussed the case of a local high school senior who was being prosecuted for the alleged rape of a 14-year-old. He said he was considering initiating a Romeo and Juliet bill in the Assembly to protect teenage couples from prosecution for statutory rape. The newspaper reported that, "When he was a teenager, Rivard's dad offered a warning. 'Some girls rape easy' ... meaning they might give in and change their minds later, or someone might change their minds for them." The Chetek Alert article came to wider public notice after a Democratic Party operative discovered it during election season—resulting in a mention in WisPolitics on October 5, and an article in the state's largest newspaper, the Milwaukee Journal Sentinel, on October 10. Rivard told the Journal Sentinel that the remarks were being taken out-of-context and misquoted, and that he had been repeating a warning from his father who had said that after agreeing to sex and becoming pregnant, some underage girls will claim it was not consensual. Three hours after the Journal Sentinel article was published, Rivard issued a statement calling rape a horrible act of violence that unfortunately often goes unreported. The district attorney who prosecuted the case involving the two high school students clarified that the sex was not consensual and also criticized Rivard's December 2011 remarks that too many people were being required to register as sex offenders.

Following the media attention to the statements about rape, a number of GOP officials quickly withdrew their endorsements of Rivard, including vice presidential nominee Paul Ryan, Governor Scott Walker, US Senator Ron Johnson, former Governor Tommy Thompson, and State Representative Robin Vos, who is in charge of Assembly campaign efforts. The Associated Builders and Contractors of Wisconsin, the Tavern League of Wisconsin, the Wisconsin Restaurant Association, and the Wisconsin Grocers Association also rescinded their endorsements of Rivard. However, he retained the support of several pro-life and business groups, and a county party rally including Rivard was held just two days after the firestorm of criticism began.

Rivard has previously made strong statements: in 2012, he compared bureaucrats and politicians to cocaine addicts and in 2011, he called pro-union protestors "terrorists". Later admitting that his comments about politicians were somewhat of an exaggeration, Rivard explained, "You look at history, anytime you lay money in front of a politician, they're going to spend it". Rivard has also been criticized for working with the American Legislative Exchange Council (ALEC) to draft state legislation, but called ALEC a "great think-tank" and denied charges that ALEC represents big business interests and not the interests of his district.

== Political positions ==
Rivard supports frac sand mining and believes it should be regulated at the state level by the Wisconsin Department of Natural Resources (DNR) as opposed to at the local level, because local officials impose unreasonable demands and conditions, and the DNR has over 60 years experience regulating sand and gravel.

Rivard does not believe BadgerCare should be expanded to more people, and believes that "use controls" on those receiving free medical care are necessary to prevent abuses. He does not believe government does a good job running large programs such as Medicare, Social Security and Amtrak.

He supports voter photo ID laws.

Rivard opposes same-sex marriage, but believes there should be some provisions in the law to recognize gay and lesbian partnerships for the purposes of medical care and inheriting property.

He does not believe there is a right to collective bargaining because it is not in the Constitution. He also says that the state's prior budget problems were due in large part to high wages demanded by unions.

He has said the best way to stimulate the local economy is for government to "get out of the way" and not over-regulate or raise taxes.

For his positions, he has received an "A" grade from the NRA Political Victory Fund, 100% ratings from Wisconsin Manufacturers & Commerce, and the American Conservative Union, a 66% rating from the League of Wisconsin Municipalities, a 21% rating from the Wisconsin League of Conservation Voters, and 0% ratings from NARAL Pro-Choice and the Sierra Club.

== Campaigns ==
Rivard has said he first ran for public office because he was concerned for the future of his descendants and believed that a businessperson such as himself could better solve government budget problems due to his understanding of economics, business regulation and taxation. In the 2010 election, Rivard was endorsed by The Chetek Alert as a common sense candidate who was locally funded and not obligated to special interests.

He ran to fill a vacant seat in the state Assembly opened by the retirement of Democrat Mary Hubler. He competed in a 4-way Republican primary against Dari McDonald, Judith Wells Espeseth, and Don Quinten, winning the Republican nomination on September 14, 2010. On November 3, 2010, he defeated Democrat Steve Perala by 415 votes, 9,950 to 9,535, or 51 percent to 49 percent.

Rivard announced in January 2012 he would seek re-election to the Assembly even if his real estate business suffered due to boycotts. His opponent in the November 2012 election was Democrat Stephen J. Smith, a Rice Lake businessman and Shell Lake resident, who is the son of a former state representative for the 75th district, Patricia Spafford Smith. Despite the October 2012 controversy over the rape remarks, a number of groups continued their support of Rivard including Wisconsin Right to Life, Pro-Life Wisconsin and the National Federation of Independent Business-Wisconsin, with Wisconsin Family Action, a family values group which opposes gay marriage as well as abortion, endorsing Rivard for the first time. Wisconsin Public Radio reported that some voters in Rivard's district were unswayed by the rape comments and would be voting for or against him based on his platform.

On November 6, 2012, he was defeated by Democrat Stephen Smith by 582 votes and with only 49% of the popular vote to 51%.

== Electoral history ==
=== Wisconsin Assembly (2010, 2012) ===
Year	Election	Date	Elected				Defeated				Total	Plurality
2010	Primary	Sep. 14	Roger Rivard	Republican	2,076	40.06%	Judith Wells Espeseth	Rep.	1,929	37.23%	5,182	147
2010	Primary	Sep. 14	Roger Rivard	Republican	2,076	40.06%	Don Quinton	Rep.	717	13.84%	5,182	147
2010	Primary	Sep. 14	Roger Rivard	Republican	2,076	40.06%	Dari McDonald	Rep.	451	8.70%	5,182	147
2010	General	Nov. 2	Roger Rivard	Republican	9,950	50.98%	Steve Perala	Dem.	9,535	48.85%	19,518	415
2010	General	Nov. 2	Roger Rivard	Republican	9,950	50.98%	John Schiess (write-in)	Rep.	8	0.04%	19,518	415
2012	General	Nov. 6	Stephen Smith	Democratic	14,456	51.02%	Roger Rivard (inc)	Rep.	13,841	48.85%	28,334	615
