= Michael J. Sheridan =

American politician, 77th Speaker of the Wisconsin Assembly

Mike Sheridan
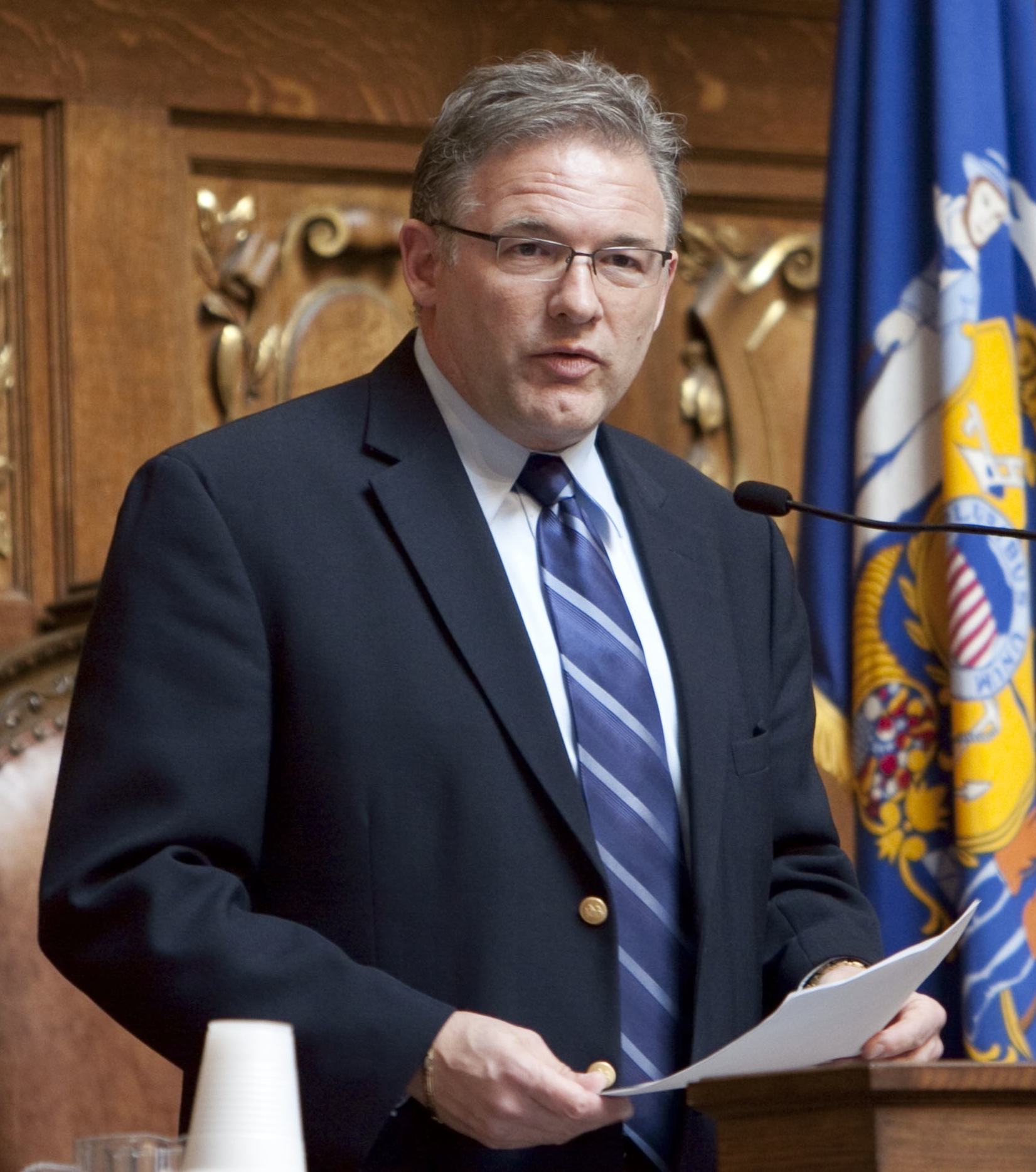

77th Speaker of the Wisconsin State Assembly
- In office January 5, 2009 – January 3, 2011
- Preceded by: Michael Huebsch
- Succeeded by: Jeff Fitzgerald

Member of the Wisconsin State Assembly from the 44th district
- In office January 3, 2005 – January 3, 2011
- Preceded by: Wayne W. Wood
- Succeeded by: Joe Knilans

Personal details
- Born: Michael James Sheridan; September 17, 1958 (age 67) Janesville, Wisconsin, U.S.
- Party: Democratic
- Spouse(s): Connie Mageland (div. 1989) Sarah Hessenauer (m. 2003; div. 2009) Kim Pavlik
- Education: University of Wisconsin, Rock County

Michael James "Mike" Sheridan (born September 17, 1958) is an American consultant, substance abuse counselor, and former politician from Janesville, Wisconsin. A Democrat, he was the 77th speaker of the Wisconsin State Assembly (2009–2011), and represented Janesville in the Assembly for six years. He currently works as head of business development in Wisconsin for Recovery Centers of America. Prior to his legislative service, he worked at the General Motors Janesville Assembly plant and was president of the United Auto Workers Local 95 from 2002 through 2008.

== Early life and UAW work ==
Sheridan was born and raised in Janesville, Wisconsin, graduating from Janesville's George S. Parker High School in 1977. Shortly after leaving school, he went to work in automobile assembly at the General Motors Janesville Assembly plant, where he became a member of the United Auto Workers Union. He was active in the union, rising through the ranks of Local 95 until becoming president in 2002. He returned to school later in life, completing his associate's degree in political science and government at University of Wisconsin–Rock County in 2004. As union president, he was involved in critical discussions which extended the viability of the Janesville plant in 2003 and 2004.

== Political career ==
Following on the announcement of the plant's survival, Sheridan launched his first campaign for public office in 2004, running for Wisconsin State Assembly in the 44th Assembly district. He faced two opponents in the Democratic primary, but prevailed with union support, receiving 47% of the vote. He went on to easily win the general election, winning 60% in a four person race. He won re-election in 2006 and 2008.

In March 2007, the Milwaukee Journal Sentinel reported on a bill sponsored by Sheridan and state representative Eugene Hahn of Cambria, Wisconsin, that would have offered a $1,000 tax credit for buyers of flex-fuel vehicles, representing a benefit for the automobile and ethanol industries. Hahn was reported to have an investment in an ethanol company, and Sheridan's position at the UAW was highlighted. The Janesville Gazette editorialized that the Janesville economy was dependent on the success of the GM plant, saying, "Voters expect him to fight for GM's interests at the Capitol."

In February 2010, Sheridan admitted dating a lobbyist for payday lenders at a time when the Wisconsin Legislature was debating regulating the industry. On November 2, 2010, Sheridan was defeated for reelection. Although Republicans were assisted by a national wave in 2010, driven by the Tea Party movement and resistance to the Affordable Care Act, Sheridan's defeat in the Janesville-based 44th Assembly district was a significant upset.

After leaving office, he remained involved in politics, working as legislative and policy director for the Wisconsin AFL-CIO. In April 2014, Sheridan announced he would run for office again, seeking to succeed state senator Timothy Cullen, who was retiring. Sheridan faced significant resistance in the Democratic primary, both from his opponents and from Democratic voices around the state. Former Assembly Democratic leader James Kreuser wrote an open letter blasting Sheridan for his personal and professional missteps in the lead-up to the 2010 election. Sheridan came in a distant third in the Democratic primary.

== Later years ==
After losing the senate primary, Sheridan left politics behind and found work in the private sector. He founded a consulting business in 2016, and around the same time began working in the area of substance abuse treatment and recovery. He has worked as a counselor at Wisconsin Voices for Recovery since at least 2017. Since 2021, he has also worked in drug abuse outreach for the University of Wisconsin School of Medicine and Public Health, and is now the state business development director for the Recovery Centers of America. Sheridan identifies as a recovering addict.

On April 8, 2024, Sheridan announced he was considering a bid for Wisconsin's 1st Congressional district to challenge incumbent Bryan Steil in the 2024 United States House of Representatives elections, but withdrew once former congressman Peter Barca entered the race.

== Personal life and family ==
Michael Sheridan has been married three times. His first wife was Connie S. Mageland. They divorced in 1989. He subsequently married Sarah L. Hessenauer in 2003, but they divorced just six years later, in 2009. He is now married to Kim Pavlik. Sheridan still resides in Janesville.

== Electoral history ==
=== Wisconsin Assembly (2004–2010) ===
Year	Election	Date	Elected				Defeated				Total	Plurality
2004	Primary	Sep. 14	Michael J. Sheridan	Democratic	2,556	47.72%	Kevin Murray	Dem.	1,840	34.35%	5,356	716
2004	Primary	Sep. 14	Michael J. Sheridan	Democratic	2,556	47.72%	Thomas Brien	Dem.	958	17.89%	5,356	716
2004	General	Nov. 2	Michael J. Sheridan	Democratic	16,053	60.27%	Ty A. Bollerud	Rep.	5,861	22.00%	26,636	10,192
2004	General	Nov. 2	Michael J. Sheridan	Democratic	16,053	60.27%	Charles A. Knipp	Ind.	3,935	14.77%	26,636	10,192
2004	General	Nov. 2	Michael J. Sheridan	Democratic	16,053	60.27%	Steve Trueblood	Ind.	748	2.81%	26,636	10,192
2006	General	Nov. 7	Michael J. Sheridan (inc)	Democratic	13,204	69.30%	Fred E. Yoss	Rep.	5,834	30.62%	19,054	7,370
2008	General	Nov. 4	Michael J. Sheridan (inc)	Democratic	19,531	99.15%					19,698	19,364
2010	General	Nov. 2	Joe Knilans	Republican	8,684	51.50%	Michael J. Sheridan (inc)	Dem.	8,169	48.45%	16,862	515

=== Wisconsin Senate (2014) ===
Wisconsin Senate, 15th District Election, 2014
Party	Candidate	Votes	%	±%
Democratic Primary, August 12, 2014
Democratic	Janis Ringhand	6,163	39.77%	
Democratic	Austin Scieszinski	5,882	37.96%	
Democratic	Michael J. Sheridan	3,448	22.25%	
	Scattering	4	0.03%	
Plurality		281	1.81%	
Total votes		15,497	100.0%	

Political offices
Preceded by Michael Huebsch	Speaker of the Wisconsin State Assembly; 2009–2011	Succeeded by Jeff Fitzgerald
