= University of Wisconsin–Eau Claire – Barron County =

University branch campus in Rice Lake, Wisconsin, U.S.

Coordinates: 45°28′58″N 91°44′47″W

- Former name: University of Wisconsin-Barron County
- Type: State University
- Established: 1966
- Parent institution: University of Wisconsin-Eau Claire
- Chancellor: James Schmidt
- Director: Abbey Fischer
- Academic staff: 27
- Undergraduates: 497
- Location: 1800 College Drive, Rice Lake, Wisconsin, United States
- Campus: Small town, 110 acres (45 ha)
- Colors: Blue and Gold
- Nickname: Blugolds
- Website: https://barron.uwec.edu/

The University of Wisconsin–Eau Claire – Barron County (also known as UWEC–Barron County or UWEC–BC) is a branch campus to the University of Wisconsin–Eau Claire. It is located in Rice Lake, Wisconsin, United States, and is a member of the University of Wisconsin System. As of the 2016–17 school year, there were 497 full and part-time students.

UWEC–BC is located on approximately 110 acres (45 ha) of partially wooded land. Six buildings comprise the campus. These include Meggers Hall/Ritzinger Hall (administration and classrooms), the Fine Arts Building, library, gymnasium, student center, and physical plant. Other educational and recreational facilities include an observatory, a Japanese Garden, a three-hole golf course, baseball diamonds, soccer fields, an eighteen-hole disc golf course, and a prairie restoration and wildlife habitat study area. The Cedar Side Walking Trail runs directly between the campus and the Red Cedar River.

== History ==
The story of UW-Barron County began in the fall of 1963 when the Wisconsin Coordinating Committee for Higher Education (CCHE) recommended that a two-year liberal arts institution be established in Rice Lake. In April 1964 the Barron County Board of Supervisors undertook the commitment to fund the physical facilities of the 'Branch Campus' with state and federal aid.

The Board of Regents of the State University System designated Stout State University in Menomonie to be the parent institution. Then in November 1965 the Barron County Board of Supervisors authorized the issuance of a $1,500,000 bond issue and tax levy to help finance the institution. And in February 1966 the 142-acre Johnson-Zimmer tract in the south of the city and abutting the east shore of the Red Cedar River was selected as the site for the new campus. For $50,000 the city took title to the property and delivered the deed to Barron County.

In February 1966 Stout State University President William J. Micheels named Dr. John F. Meggers as the first dean of the campus. The newly formed Barron County Campus of Stout State University opened in September 1966, offering a freshman course curriculum to over 100 students in the Ann Street facility which was headquarters for the Barron County Teacher's College. The addition of basic sophomore courses was added the following year, which caused the campus' enrollment to increase dramatically. In June 1967 the Barron County Teacher's College graduated their final class of students and ceased to exist.

In April 1967 groundbreaking ceremonies were held on the site of the new campus after the County Board approved the final bids and alternates on the $3,000,000 project. The architectural firm of Hirsch & Stevens of St. Paul was hired to design the structures and the Rice Lake firm of Vonasek & Schieffer was selected as the general contractor. In September 1967 bricks and mortar rose on the Johnson-Zimmer site and the campus embarked on the second year of liberal arts studies with 201 students, still in the makeshift quarters.

March 1968 was moving day from the Ann Street facility into the new seven building campus, and two months later, on Memorial Day, the first two-year graduation class participated in commencement exercises at the new campus. The formal dedication of the Barron County Campus of Stout State University in Rice Lake, Wisconsin was held in September 1968.

With the 1972 merger of the University of Wisconsin and State University Systems, the campus became part of the University of Wisconsin Center System and was known as UW Center-Barron County, until 1983 when the institution became known as the University of Wisconsin Centers. In 1997, the name of the institution was changed to the University of Wisconsin Colleges and the campus name to UW–Barron County.

Friday, October 27, 2006, marked the dedication of the $6.4 million expansion/renovation project and 40th anniversary celebration. The renovation project connected Meggers and Ritzinger Hall and offered state-of-the-art science labs, high-tech classrooms, tutorial facilities, and a comfortable student activity space.

== UW system restructuring ==
On October 11, 2017, the University of Wisconsin System President, Ray Cross, announced a proposal for merging the 13 two-year UW Colleges with four-year UW institutions. There were two main reasons for the restructuring: enrollment across all of the 13 two-year colleges had declined 32% on average (−35% for UW–Barron County) from 2010 through 2017, as well as current demographic trends indicate that current enrollment challenges are not likely to significantly improve in coming years, with current projections for 2040 indicating a mere 0.4% increase of people age 18–64 in Wisconsin.

The Higher Learning Commission approved the joining of UW-Barron County and UW-Eau Claire on June 29, 2018. The merger became effective on July 1, 2018.

== Notable alumni ==
- Roger Rivard, politician and businessman
- Patricia Spafford Smith, politician and businesswoman

== Academics ==
UWEC–BC provides the first two years of a liberal arts general education, and the campus awards graduating students with the Associate of Arts and Sciences degree. The college is accredited by the Higher Learning Commission.

Most students can complete all the appropriate general education courses for their major at the campus. Areas of study that are available include pre-professional programs, agriculture and natural resources, the biological sciences, business, communications and letters, education, engineering, fine arts, foreign languages, health studies, mathematics and computer science, the physical sciences, public affairs and service, and the social sciences.

UWEC–Barron County offers both a textbook rental system and the option to purchase new and used materials through an onsite bookstore or though their website.

== Athletics ==
UWEC–Barron County athletic teams are called the "Chargers". As of the 2017-18 school year, the Chargers belong to the Wisconsin Collegiate Conference (WCC) which comprises the fourteen UW Colleges campuses, and the Wisconsin Junior College Athletic Association (WJCAA). Charger sports include golf, women's volleyball, men's basketball, and men's club baseball. Following the merger with UW–Eau Claire, the school's colors changed from maroon and white to blue and gold. The campus changed to the Blugolds in 2022/23 finalizing the integration with the main campus.
