= Stephen J. Smith (politician) =

American politician

Member of the Wisconsin State Assembly from the 75th district
- In office January 7, 2013 – January 3, 2015
- Preceded by: Roger Rivard
- Succeeded by: Romaine Quinn

Personal details
- Born: August 31, 1951 (age 75) Minneapolis, Minnesota
- Party: Democratic
- Parent: Patricia Spafford Smith (mother)
- Education: University of Wisconsin-Superior (B.S.)
- Profession: Accountant

Stephen J. Smith (born August 31, 1951) is an American businessman, accountant, and Democratic politician, who served in the Wisconsin State Assembly.

== Background ==
Smith graduated from the University of Wisconsin–Superior and is a business owner and accountant. His mother, Patricia Spafford Smith, who died in 2002, was also a business owner and accountant, and served in the Assembly as a Democrat from 1979 to 1983.

== Public office ==
Smith served on the Barron County, Wisconsin Board of Supervisors. On November 6, 2012, he was elected to the Wisconsin State Assembly's 75th district (the same district his mother had represented) as a Democrat, defeating Republican incumbent Roger Rivard, who had become controversial after quoting his father as telling him as a teenager that "some girls rape easy" as a warning that what he may think is consensual teenage sex can become rape after the fact.

On November 4, 2014, Republican Romaine Quinn defeated Smith for the Wisconsin Assembly seat.
