= Jeff Fitzgerald =

American politician, 78th Speaker of the Wisconsin Assembly

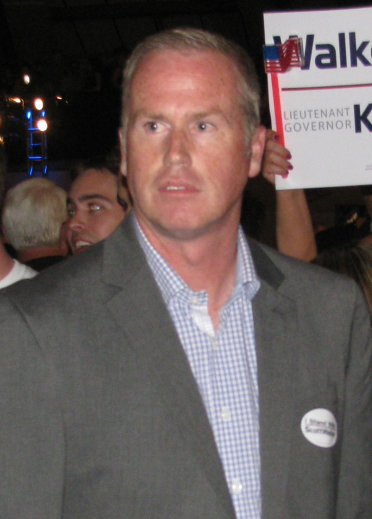
- Fitzgerald in 2012

78th Speaker of the Wisconsin State Assembly
- In office January 3, 2011 – January 3, 2013
- Preceded by: Michael J. Sheridan
- Succeeded by: Robin Vos

Member of the Wisconsin State Assembly from the 39th district
- In office January 3, 2001 – January 3, 2013
- Preceded by: Robert Goetsch
- Succeeded by: Mark Born

Personal details
- Born: October 12, 1966 (age 59) Chicago, Illinois, U.S.
- Party: Republican
- Spouse: Andrea Fitzgerald
- Children: 2
- Relatives: Scott L. Fitzgerald (brother)
- Education: University of Wisconsin–Oshkosh
- Occupation: Politician, businessman

Jeff Fitzgerald (born October 12, 1966) is an American businessman and politician who served as the 78th Speaker of the Wisconsin State Assembly during the 100th Wisconsin Legislature. A Republican, he represented the 39th Assembly District from 2001 until 2013. He ran for the United States Senate in 2012, but lost the Republican primary by a wide margin to former Governor Tommy Thompson. After leaving the Assembly, he became a lobbyist.

== Early life and education ==
Born in Chicago, Illinois, Fitzgerald moved with his family to Hustisford, Wisconsin. After graduating from Hustisford High School, Fitzgerald attended University of Wisconsin-Green Bay and received his bachelor's degree from the University of Wisconsin-Oshkosh.

== Career ==
He was a small business owner and served on the Beaver Dam, Wisconsin Common Council from 2000 to 2003. He is a member of the Chicago Mercantile Exchange.

=== Wisconsin State Assembly ===
==== Elections ====
He was elected in 2000. In 2002, he won re-election unopposed. In 2004, he won re-election a third term with 70% of the vote. In 2006, he won re-election to a fourth term with 63% of the vote. In 2008, he won re-election to a fifth term with 60% of the vote. In 2010, he won re-election to a sixth term unopposed. In 2012, he decided against running for re-election, instead announcing, in October 2011, that he would seek the Republican nomination for the U.S. Senate seat vacated by retiring US Senator Herb Kohl.

==== 2012 U.S. Senate election ====
In October 2011, Fitzgerald announced that he would run for the United States Senate seat being vacated by retiring Senator Herb Kohl, a Democrat. He lost the nomination on August 14, 2012 in a four-way primary battle against former Governor Tommy Thompson (the winner), millionaire Eric Hovde, and former Congressman Mark Neumann.

== Personal life ==
Jeff Fitzgerald lives with his wife, Andrea, and two children in Horicon, Wisconsin. His older brother, Scott L. Fitzgerald, is the U.S. representative for Wisconsin's 5th congressional district, and the former State Senate Majority Leader. Jeff's state assembly district was coextensive with the northeastern portion of Scott's state senate district; in Wisconsin, state senate districts are formed by combining three state assembly districts.

Wisconsin State Assembly
Preceded by Robert Goetsch	Member of the Wisconsin State Assembly from the 39th district 2001–2013	Succeeded by Mark Born
Preceded by Michael J. Sheridan	Speaker of the Wisconsin State Assembly; 2011–2013	Succeeded by Robin Vos
