= Evan Wynn =

American politician

Member of the Wisconsin State Assembly from the 43rd district
- In office January 3, 2011 – January 7, 2013
- Preceded by: Kim Hixson
- Succeeded by: Andy Jorgensen

Personal details
- Born: June 20, 1962 (age 64) East St. Louis, Illinois
- Party: Republican
- Education: Murray State University, UW-Whitewater, Parkland College
- Profession: Paratrooper, Politician, Former Teacher

Evan Wynn (born June 20, 1962) is a former Wisconsin legislator.

Born in East St. Louis, Illinois, Wynn graduated from Steeleville High School in Steeleville, Illinois. He then attended Murray State University, Parkland College, and later graduated from University of Wisconsin–Whitewater in 2009. He was elected to the Wisconsin State Assembly in 2010. He served in the U.S. Marines Reserve from 1980 to 1984, and the U.S. Army from 1986 to 2006 when he served in the Iraq War. He is a member of the American legion, Gideons International, Wisconsin Farm Bureau and the National Rifle Association of America. Wynn was defeated in the general election held on November 6, 2012, by fellow member of the Wisconsin Assembly Andy Jorgensen.
