= Kenneth M. Schricker =

American politician

Kenneth M. Schricker (February 28, 1921 – March 1, 1978) was a member of the Wisconsin State Assembly. Schricker was elected to the Assembly in 1974, defeating Howard W. Cameron. He was a Republican.

== Career ==
Born in Washburn County, Wisconsin, Schricker served in the United States Navy Air Corps during World War II. Schricker was a locomotive engineer. He also served on the Spooner Town Board. He died while still in office.
