= Andy Jorgensen =

American politician

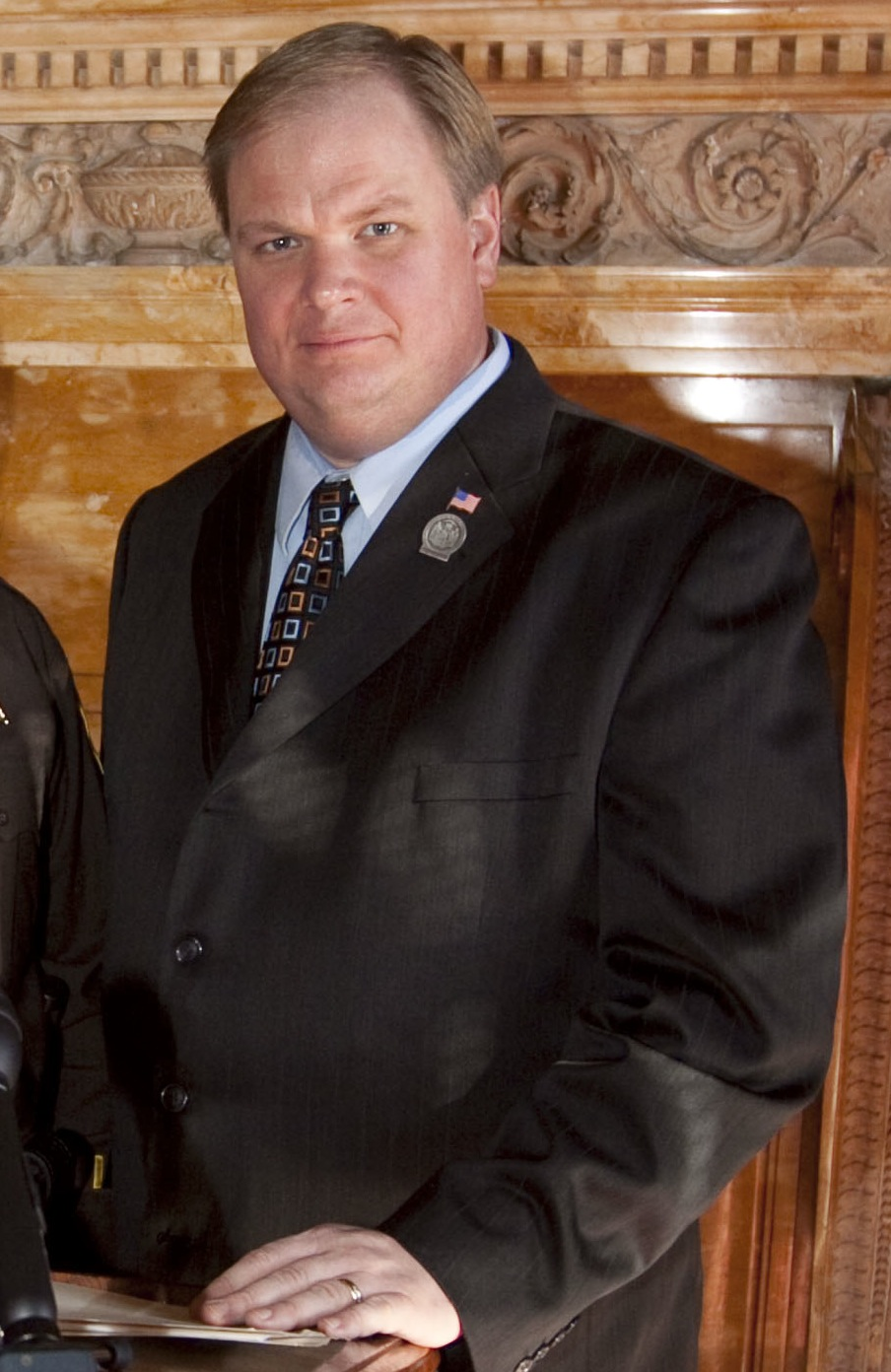
- Jorgensen in 2009

Member of the Wisconsin State Assembly
- In office January 7, 2013 – January 3, 2017
- Preceded by: Evan Wynn
- Succeeded by: Don Vruwink
- Constituency: 43rd district
- In office January 3, 2007 – January 7, 2013
- Preceded by: David W. Ward
- Succeeded by: John Jagler
- Constituency: 37th district

Personal details
- Born: September 10, 1967 (age 59) Berlin, Wisconsin
- Party: Democratic
- Spouse: married
- Education: Brown College (Minnesota)
- Occupation: radio broadcaster, auto worker, union steward

Andrew Earl Jorgensen (born September 10, 1967) is a former member of the Wisconsin State Assembly. He represented the 43rd Assembly District from 2013 to 2017 and had previously represented the 37th from 2007 to 2013, both times as a member of the Democratic Party. He was a member of the Committees on Agriculture, Biofuels and Sustainable Energy, Consumer Protection and Personal Privacy, and Rural Affairs. As a result of redistricting, Mr. Jorgensen's district was divided, and on November 6, 2012, he defeated incumbent Evan Wynn to represent the 43rd Assembly District.

Jorgensen was born in Berlin, Wisconsin. He graduated from Omro High School in Omro, Wisconsin in 1986. He attended the Brown Institute, in 1987, to train for a career in radio broadcasting. He worked as a DJ and program host at WNBK in New London, then moved to WFAW, in Fort Atkinson. In 1995, he began working on the assembly line at General Motors’ Janesville plant, where he served as a shop steward for UAW Local 95.

He is also an active member of Trinity Lutheran Church, where he teaches Sunday school. He and his wife have three children.
