= Tom Larson (Wisconsin politician) =

American politician (1948–2017)

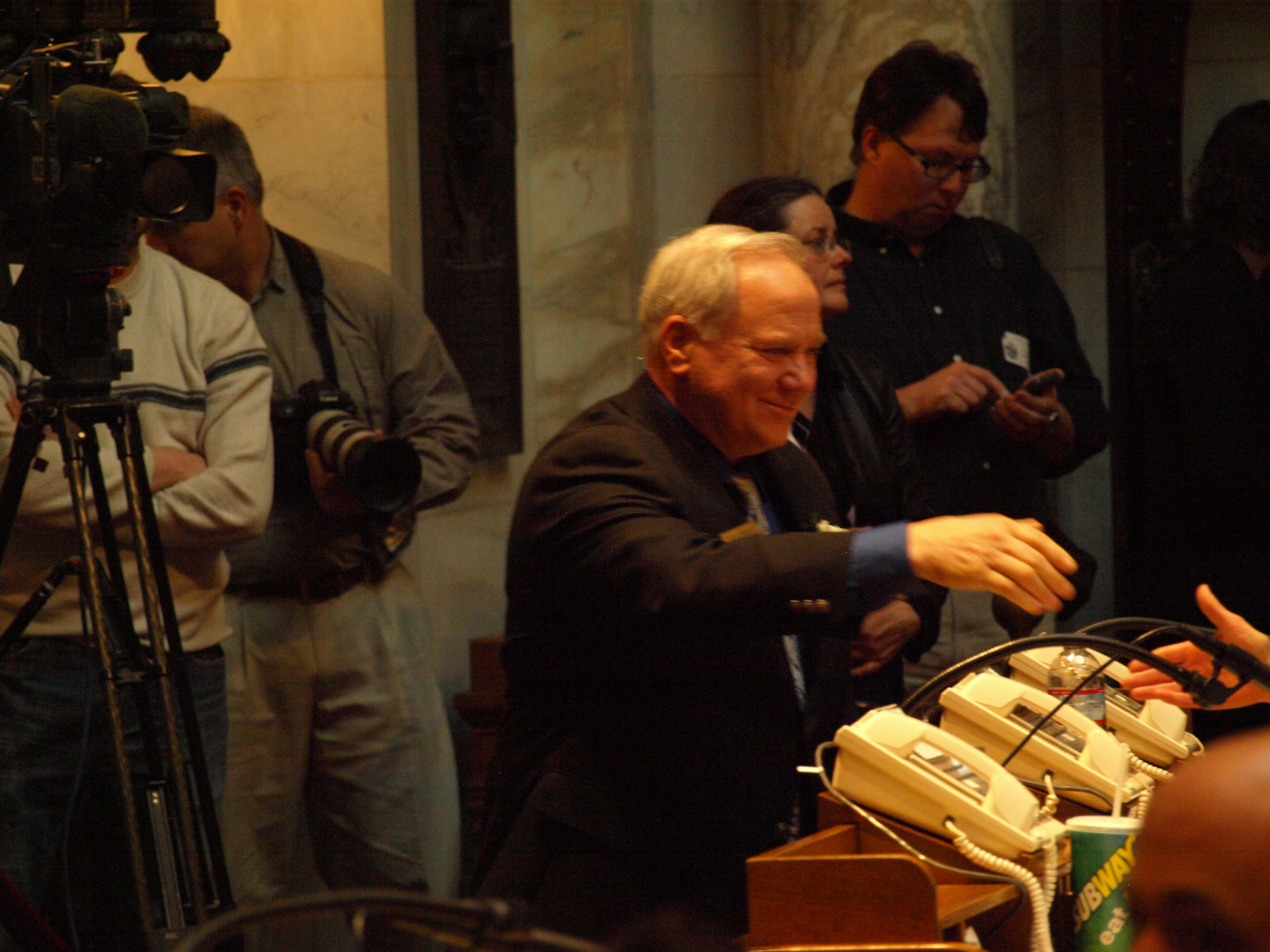
- Larson in 2013

Member of the Wisconsin State Assembly from the 67th district
- In office January 3, 2011 – January 3, 2017
- Preceded by: Jeffrey Wood
- Succeeded by: Rob Summerfield

Personal details
- Born: February 11, 1948 Eau Claire, Wisconsin
- Died: February 18, 2017 (aged 69) Bloomer, Wisconsin
- Party: Republican
- Education: Chippewa Valley Technical College
- Profession: Politician, Master Electrician

Thomas L Larson (February 11, 1948 – February 18, 2017) was an American politician and legislator.

Born in Eau Claire, Wisconsin to Wallace and Phyllis (DeLong) Larson, Tom lived in Colfax, Wisconsin and went to Colfax High School. Larson then attended the Chippewa Valley Technical College and was an electrician. He was elected to the Wisconsin State Assembly in 2010 and served until 2017. Larson died in Bloomer, Wisconsin from lung cancer.
