= Mary Hubler =

American politician (born 1952)

Member of the Wisconsin State Assembly from the 75th district
- In office January 7, 1985 – January 3, 2011
- Preceded by: Robert Cowles
- Succeeded by: Roger Rivard

Personal details
- Born: July 31, 1952 (age 74)
- Party: Democratic
- Education: University of Wisconsin, Superior, University of Wisconsin Law School
- Profession: attorney, Legislator, Educator

Mary Hubler (born July 31, 1952) is an American attorney and Democratic politician. She served 26 years in the Wisconsin State Assembly (1985–2011) representing Barron County and neighboring municipalities of northwest Wisconsin.

She was the chair of the Committee on Ethics and Standards of Conduct and a member of the Committee on Veterans and Military Affairs, the Joint Committee for Review of Administrative Rules, and the Special Committee on State Trails Policy. She was the co-chair for both the Joint Survey Committee on Retirement Systems and the Joint Survey Committee on Tax Exemptions.

Wisconsin State Assembly
| Preceded by Robert Cowles | Member of the Wisconsin State Assembly from the 75th district January 7, 1985 – January 3, 2011 | Succeeded by Roger Rivard |
