= 2004 Wisconsin Senate election =

2004 Wisconsin State Senate election
- November 2, 2004

16 of 33 seats in the Wisconsin Senate 17 seats needed for a majority

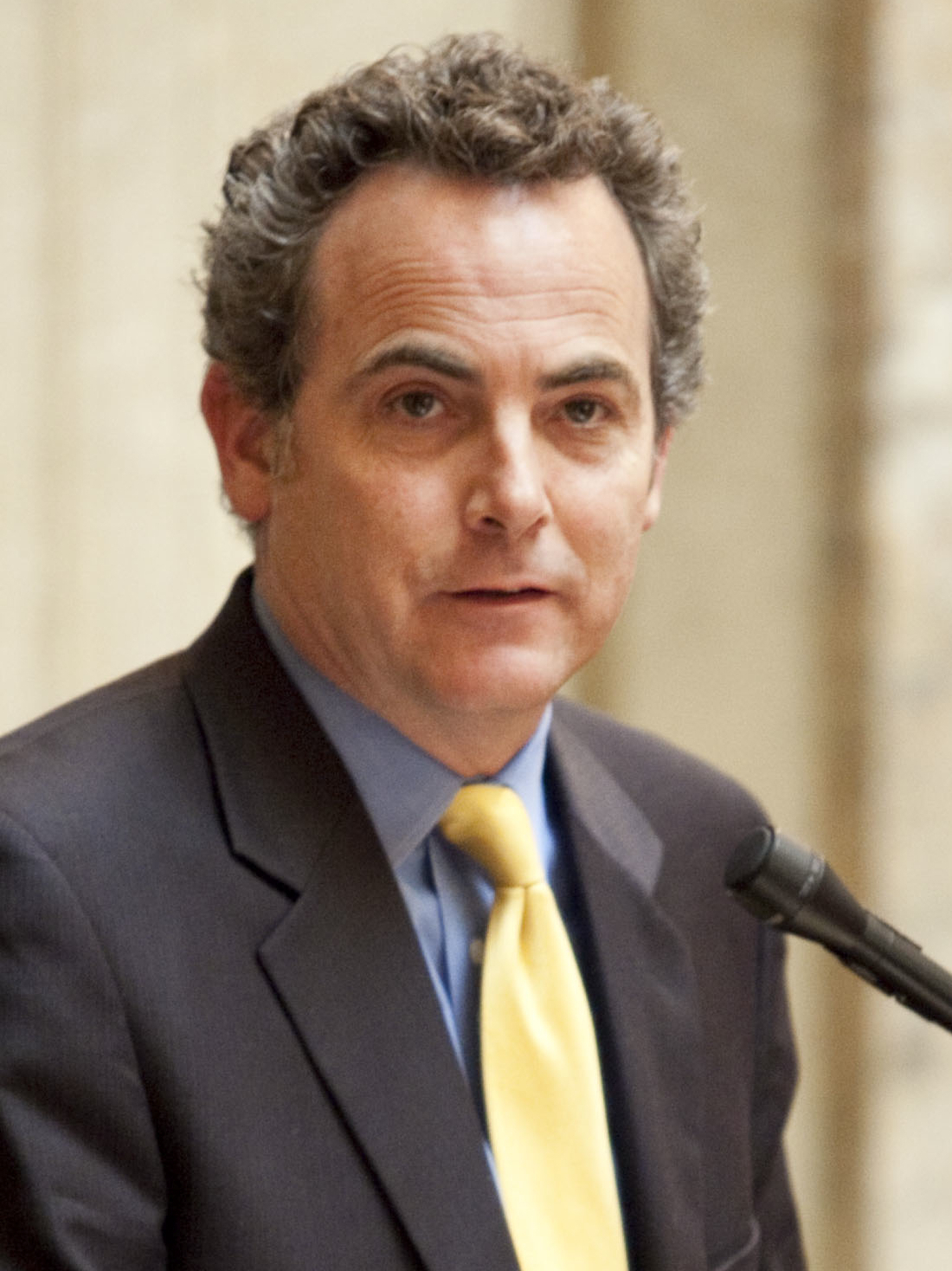
	Majority party	Minority party
Leader	Mary Panzer (lost renomination)	Jon Erpenbach
Party	Republican	Democratic
Leader since	January 25, 2000	January 6, 2003
Leader's seat	20th–West Bend	27th–Middleton
Last election	11 seats, 52.71%	6 seats, 45.93%
Seats before	18	15
Seats won	8	8
Seats after	19	14
Seat change	▲1	▼1
Popular vote	673,072	566,889
Percentage	53.06%	44.69%
Swing	▲0.35%	▼1.24%
- Republican hold Republican gain Democratic hold No election 50–60% 80–90% >90% 50–60% 60–70% 80–90% >90% No election
President before election
Alan Lasee
Republican
Elected President
Alan Lasee
Republican

The 2004 Wisconsin Senate election was held on Tuesday November 2, 2004, at the Fall general election in Wisconsin, alongside the election to the State Assembly and other statewide and local offices. The Sixteen even-numbered seats in Wisconsin Senate were up for election. Prior to the election 18 seats were held by Republicans and 15 were held by Democrats. The primary election was held on September 14, 2004.

This was the first state Senate elections held in these seats under the 2002 redistricting plan.

After the election, Republicans entered the 97th Wisconsin Legislature with 19 of 33 seats.

== Summary ==
Seats		Party (majority caucus shading)		Total
Seats		Republican	Democratic	Total
Last election (2002)		11	6	17
Total after last election (2002)		18	15	33
Total before this election		18	15	33
Up for election		7	9	16
of which:	Incumbent retiring	3	1	4
of which:	Vacated	0	0	0
of which:	Unopposed	3	2	5
This election		8	8	16
Change from last election		▲1	▼1	Steady
Total after this election		19	14	33
Change in total		▲1	▼1	Steady

Party	Candidates	Votes	
Party	Candidates	No.	%
Republican	13	673,072	53.06%
Democratic	11	566,889	44.69%
Green	1	16,807	1.33%
Libertarian	1	7,288	0.57%
Write-in	–	4,373	0.35%
Total		1,268,429	100.0%

=== Close races ===
Seats where the margin of victory was under 10%:

- State Senate district 22, 4.27%
- State Senate district 32, 5.07% (gain)
- State Senate district 12, 6.98%
- State Senate district 30, 9.20%

== Outgoing incumbent ==
=== Retiring ===
- Chuck Chvala (D–Monona), representing district 16 since 1985, retired.
- Mark Meyer (D–La Crosse), representing district 32 since 2000, retired.

=== Seeking other office ===
- Gwen Moore (D–Milwaukee), representing district 4 since 1992, ran successfully for U.S. House in the 4th district.
- Robert Welch (R–Marion), representing district 14 since 1995, ran unsuccessfully for U.S. Senate.

=== Lost renomination ===
- Mary Panzer (R–West Bend), representing district 20 since 1993, lost renomination to Glenn Grothman (R–West Bend).

== Results summary ==
Dist.	Incumbent				This race
Dist.	Member	Party	First elected	Status	Candidates
02	Robert Cowles	Republican	1987 (special)	Incumbent re-elected	▌ ✓ Robert Cowles (Rep.) 89.13%; ▌Roy Leyendecker (Rep.) 10.73%
04	Gwen Moore	Democratic	1992	Incumbent ran for U.S. House; New member elected. Democratic hold.	▌ ✓ Lena Taylor (Dem.) 99.16%
06	Spencer Coggs	Democratic	2003 (recall)	Incumbent re-elected	▌ ✓ Spencer Coggs (Dem.) 99.15%
08	Alberta Darling	Republican	1992	Incumbent re-elected	▌ ✓ Alberta Darling (Rep.) 56.94%; ▌Jennifer Morales (Dem.) 42.96%
10	Sheila Harsdorf	Republican	2000	Incumbent re-elected	▌ ✓ Sheila Harsdorf (Rep.) 59.21%; ▌Gary L. Bakke (Dem.) 40.73%
12	Roger Breske	Democratic	1992	Incumbent re-elected	▌ ✓ Roger Breske (Dem.) 53.47%; ▌Tom Tiffany (Rep.) 46.49%
14	Robert Welch	Republican	1995 (special)	Incumbent ran for U.S. Senate; New member elected. Republican hold.	▌ ✓ Luther Olsen (Rep.) 99.35%
16	Chuck Chvala	Democratic	1984	Incumbent retired New member elected. Democratic hold.	▌ Mark Miller (Dem.) 60.04%; ▌Eric P. Peterson (Rep.) 39.90%
18	Carol Roessler	Republican	1987 (special)	Incumbent re-elected	▌ ✓ Carol Roessler (Rep.) 98.60%
20	Mary Panzer	Republican	1993 (special)	Incumbent lost renomination New member elected. Republican hold.	▌ ✓ Glenn Grothman (Rep.) 99.15%
22	Robert Wirch	Democratic	1996	Incumbent re-elected	▌ ✓ Robert Wirch (Dem.) 52.11%; ▌Reince Priebus (Rep.) 47.84%
24	Julie Lassa	Democratic	2003 (special)	Incumbent re-elected	▌ ✓ Julie Lassa (Dem.) 67.57%; ▌Greg Swank (Rep.) 32.39%
26	Fred Risser	Democratic	1962 (special)	Incumbent re-elected	▌ ✓ Fred Risser (Rep.) 80.81%; ▌Tony Schultz (Grn.) 18.93%
28	Mary Lazich	Republican	1998 (special)	Incumbent re-elected	▌ ✓ Mary Lazich (Rep.) 99.27%
30	Dave Hansen	Democratic	2000	Incumbent re-elected	▌ ✓ Dave Hansen (Dem.) 54.55%; ▌Gary Drzewiecki (Rep.) 45.35%
32	Mark Meyer	Democratic	2000	Incumbent retired New member elected. Republican gain.	▌ ✓ Dan Kapanke (Rep.) 52.46%; ▌Brad Pfaff (Dem.) 47.39%

== Detailed results ==
=== District 2 ===
Incumbent Republican Robert Cowles ran for re-election. He defeated Libertarian Roy Leyendecker by a wide margin.

District 2 general election
Party	Candidate	Votes	%
Republican	Robert Cowles (incumbent)	60,546	89.13
Libertarian	Roy Leyendecker	7,288	10.73
Write-in		95	0.14
Total votes		67,929	100.0

=== District 4 ===
Incumbent Democrat Gwen Moore declined to seek re-election, instead running successfully for congress. State legislator Lena Taylor defeated fellow legislator Johnnie E. Morris-Tatum with a plurality 10-point margin. Taylor was elected unopposed in the general election.

District 4 Democratic primary
Party	Candidate	Votes	%
Democratic	Lena Taylor	10,042	46.80
Democratic	Johnnie E. Morris-Tatum	7,735	36.05
Democratic	James White	3,633	16.93
Write-in		25	0.07
Total votes		33,063	100.0

District 4 general election
Party	Candidate	Votes	%
Democratic	Lena Taylor	62,689	99.16
Write-in		534	0.84
Total votes		63,223	100.0

=== District 6 ===
Incumbent Democrat Spencer Coggs ran for re-election unopposed.

District 6 general election
Party	Candidate	Votes	%
Democratic	Spencer Coggs (incumbent)	59,463	99.15
Write-in		509	0.85
Total votes		24,939	100.0

=== District 8 ===
Incumbent Republican Alberta Darling ran for re-election. She defeated Democrat Jennifer Morales by a 14-point margin.

District 8 general election
Party	Candidate	Votes	%
Republican	Alberta Darling (incumbent)	55,731	56.94
Democratic	Jennifer Morales	42,048	42.96
Write-in		100	0.10
Total votes		97,879	100.0

=== District 10 ===
County results: Bakke—40–50% Bakke—50–60% Clausing—40–50% Clausing—50–60%

Incumbent Republican Sheila Harsdorf ran for re-election. She defeated Democrat Gary L. Bakke by a 19-point margin.

District 10 Democratic primary
Party	Candidate	Votes	%
Democratic	Gary L. Bakke	3,577	43.89
Democratic	Alice Clausing	3,438	42.19
Democratic	Elise O'Meara Nooney	718	8.81
Democratic	Dennis Paulaha	411	5.04
Write-in		5	0.06
Total votes		8,149	100.0

District 10 general election
Party	Candidate	Votes	%
Republican	Sheila Harsdorf (incumbent)	56,704	59.21
Democratic	Gary L. Bakke	39,001	40.73
Write-in		55	0.06
Total votes		95,760	100.0

=== District 12 ===
County results: Breske—50–60% Breske—60–70% Breske—80–90% Tiffany—50–60%

Incumbent Democrat Roger Breske ran for re-election. He defeated Republican Tom Tiffany by a seven-point margin.

District 12 Republican primary
Party	Candidate	Votes	%
Republican	Tom Tiffany	8,909	60.44
Republican	Gary Baier	2,998	20.34
Republican	William E. Raduege	2,828	19.19
Write-in		5	0.03
Total votes		14,740	100.0

District 12 general election
Party	Candidate	Votes	%
Democratic	Roger Breske (incumbent)	47,287	53.47
Republican	Tom Tiffany	41,119	46.49
Write-in		38	0.04
Total votes		88,444	100.0

=== District 14 ===
Incumbent Republican Robert Welch declined to seek re-election. Republican Luther Olsen ran unopposed in the general election.

District 14 Republican primary
Party	Candidate	Votes	%
Republican	Luther Olsen	10,224	57.24
Republican	Roger D. Cross	5,703	31.93
Republican	John C. Spillner Sr.	1,613	9.03
Write-in		323	1.81
Total votes		14,740	100.0

District 14 general election
Party	Candidate	Votes	%
Republican	Luther Olsen	57,548	99.35
Write-in		378	0.65
Total votes		57,926	100.0

=== District 16 ===
Incumbent Democrat and former Senate majority leader Chuck Chvala declined to seek re-election in the wake of the 2002 caucus scandal. Chvala, who had previously served as Democratic caucus leader until October 2002, was implicated in the wider caucus scandal that year, which saw legislative leaders in both parties charged with misusing state funds for campaign work. After facing calls to retire or resign during the last two years of his term, Chvala announced his retirement in March 2004, with Democratic representative Mark F. Miller announcing a campaign several days afterwards. He faced fellow Democratic legislator Tom Hebl, defeating him by a 17-point margin. Miller went on to face Republican Eric Peterson, who centered his campaign around Chvala's involvement in the caucus scandal, making numerous attempts to tie Miller to Chvala's misconduct in office. Miller went on to defeat Petersonn by a 20-point margin.

District 16 Democratic primary
Party	Candidate	Votes	%
Democratic	Mark F. Miller	8,582	58.16
Democratic	Tom Hebl	6,170	41.81
Write-in		4	0.03
Total votes		14,756	100.0

District 16 general election
Party	Candidate	Votes	%
Democratic	Mark F. Miller	58,147	60.04
Republican	Eric P. Peterson	38,643	39.90
Write-in		51	0.05
Total votes		96,841	100.0

=== District 18 ===
Incumbent Republican Carol Roessler ran for re-election unopposed.

District 18 general election
Party	Candidate	Votes	%
Republican	Carol Roessler (incumbent)	57,548	99.35
Write-in		378	0.65
Total votes		64,608	100.0

=== District 20 ===
Incumbent Republican Mary Panzer ran for re-election. She lost renomination to state representative Glenn Grothman by a 57-point margin. The primary was described as an ideological battle between staunch conservative Speaker of the assembly John Gard and Panzer, who had frustrated Gard's push for conservative priorities such as a Taxpayer's Bill of Rights Amendment. Grothman ran for election unopposed in the general election.

District 20 Republican primary
Party	Candidate	Votes	%
Republican	Glenn Grothman	27,732	78.84
Republican	Mary Panzer (incumbent)	7,430	21.12
Write-in		13	0.04
Total votes		35,175	100.0

District 20 general election
Party	Candidate	Votes	%
Republican	Glenn Grothman	75,424	99.15
Write-in		649	0.85
Total votes		76,073	100.0

=== District 22 ===
Incumbent Democrat Robert Wirch ran for re-election. He defeated Republican attorney Reince Priebus by a five-point margin. At the time, the race gained attention for the high amounts of funds Priebus had amassed for the campaign.

District 22 general election
Party	Candidate	Votes	%
Democratic	Robert Wirch (incumbent)	42,097	52.11
Republican	Reince Priebus	38,644	47.84
Write-in		38	0.05
Total votes		80,779	100.0

=== District 24 ===
Incumbent Democrat Julie Lassa ran for re-election. She defeated Republican Greg Swank by a wide margin.

District 22 general election
Party	Candidate	Votes	%
Democratic	Julie Lassa (incumbent)	58,259	67.57
Republican	Greg Swank	27,926	32.39
Write-in		35	0.04
Total votes		86,220	100.0

=== District 26 ===
Incumbent Democrat Fred Risser ran for re-election. He defeated Green party candidate Tony Schultz by as wide margin.

District 22 general election
Party	Candidate	Votes	%
Democratic	Fred Risser (incumbent)	71,745	80.81
Green	Tony Schultz	16,807	18.93
Write-in		225	0.25
Total votes		88,777	100.0

=== District 28 ===
Incumbent Republican Mary Lazich ran for re-election unopposed.

District 28 general election
Party	Candidate	Votes	%
Republican	Mary Lazich (incumbent)	73,899	99.27
Write-in		544	0.73
Total votes		74,443	100.0

=== District 30 ===
Incumbent Democrat Dave Hansen ran for re-election. In the Republican primary, former State senator Gary Drzewiecki defeated businessman David Steffen in a mild upset. Hansen defeated Drzewiecki in a rematch of the 2000 election by nine points.

District 30 Republican primary
Party	Candidate	Votes	%
Republican	Gary Drzewiecki	6,404	52.69
Republican	David Steffen	5,738	47.21
Write-in		11	0.09
Total votes		12,153	100.0

District 30 general election
Party	Candidate	Votes	%
Democratic	Dave Hansen (incumbent)	44,225	52.11
Republican	Gary Drzewiecki	36,766	45.35
Write-in		81	0.10
Total votes		81,072	100.0

=== District 32 ===
Incumbent Democrat Mark Meyer declined to seek re-election. business owner Dan Kapanke defeated Democrat Brad Pfaff by a five-point margin.

District 32 Democratic primary
Party	Candidate	Votes	%
Democratic	Brad Pfaff	8,637	79.13
Democratic	Monte L. Jacobson	2,258	20.69
Write-in		20	0.18
Total votes		10,915	100.0

District 32 general election
Party	Candidate	Votes	%
Republican	Dan Kapanke	46,416	52.46
Democratic	Brad Pfaff	41,928	47.39
Write-in		139	0.16
Total votes		88,483	100.0
