= 2020 Wisconsin Senate election =

- November 3, 2020

16 of 33 seats in the Wisconsin State Senate 17 seats needed for a majority
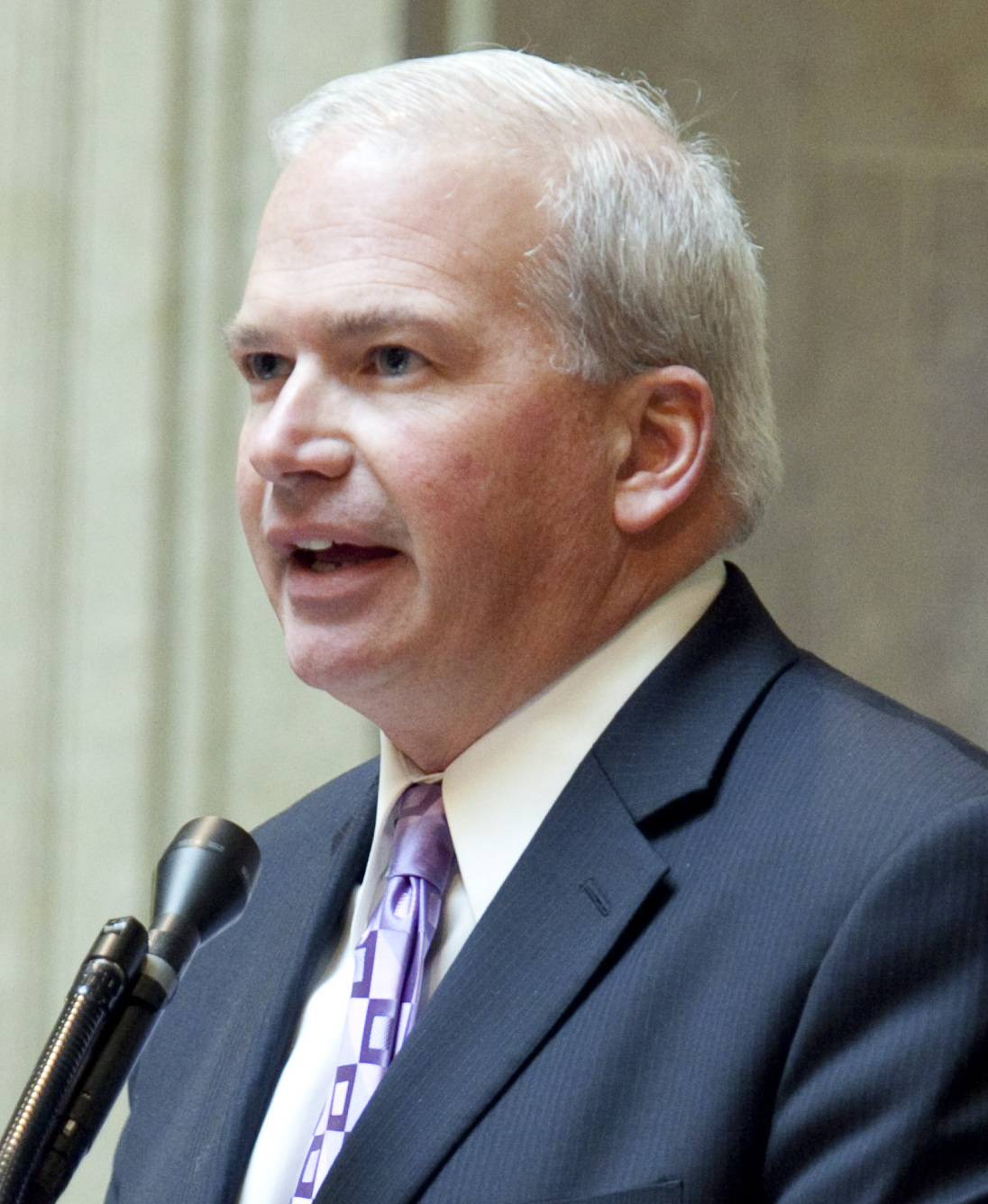

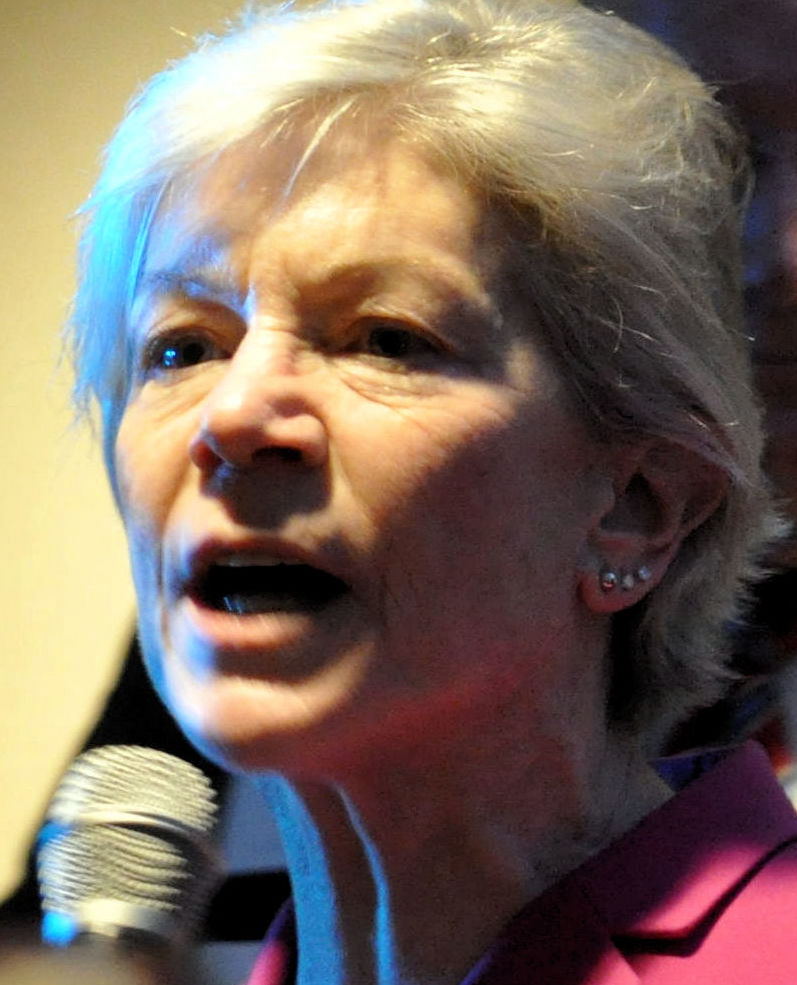
	Majority party	Minority party
Leader	Scott Fitzgerald (retired)	Janet Bewley
Party	Republican	Democratic
Leader since	January 1, 2007	April 24, 2020
Leader's seat	13th–Juneau	25th–Mason
Last election	11 seats, 52.31%	6 seats, 46.90%
Seats before	19	14
Seats won	10	6
Seats after	21	12
Seat change	▲2	▼2
Popular vote	1,665,487	1,402,108
Percentage	53.8%	45.29%
Swing	▲1.5 pp	▼1.6 pp
- Results of the elections: Republican hold Republican gain Democratic hold No election
President before election
Roger Roth
Republican
Elected President
Chris Kapenga
Republican

The 2020 Wisconsin Senate elections were held on Tuesday, November 3, 2020, at the Fall general election in Wisconsin. 16 of the 33 seats in the Wisconsin Senate were up for election—the even-numbered districts. Before the election, Republicans held 18 seats, Democrats held 13, and two were vacant. Of the seats up for election, seven were held by Republicans, seven were held by Democrats, one was vacated by a Democratic resignation, and one was vacated by a Republican resignation. The primary election was held on August 11, 2020.

Republicans maintained control of the Senate but fell one seat short of a supermajority, defeating one Democratic incumbent and winning an open seat previously held by a Democrat. After the elections, Republicans were set to enter the 105th Wisconsin Legislature with 21 of 33 seats, but one member resigned due to election to another office, leaving them with 20 seats at the start of the legislative term.

== Results summary ==
Seats		Party (majority caucus shading)		Total
Seats		Democratic	Republican	Total
Last election (2018)		6	11	17
Total after last election (2018)		14	19	33
Total before this election		14	19	31
Up for election		8	8	16
of which:	Incumbent retiring	3	2	5
of which:	Vacated	1	1	2
of which:	Unopposed	3	2	5
This election		6	10	16
Change from last election		Steady	▼1	▼1
Total after this election		12	21	33
Change in total		▼2	▲2	Steady

=== Close races ===
Seats where the margin of victory was under 10%:

1. State Senate district 32, 0.6%
2. State Senate district 8, 8.54%
3. State Senate district 30, 9.4% (gain)

== Outgoing incumbents ==
=== Retiring ===
- Dave Craig (R–Vernon), representing District 28 since 2017, declined to seek re-election.
- Dave Hansen (D–Green Bay), representing District 30 since 2001, declined to seek re-election.
- Mark F. Miller (D–Monona), representing District 16 since 2005, declined to seek re-election.
- Luther Olsen (R–Ripon), representing District 14 since 2005, declined to seek re-election
- Fred Risser (D–Madison), representing District 26 since 1963, declined to seek re-election.

=== Vacated office ===
- Jennifer Shilling (D–La Crosse), who had represented District 32 since 2011, resigned her seat on May 15, 2020 in order to explore "unspecified career opportunities."
- Tom Tiffany (R–Hazelhurst), representing District 12 since 2013, resigned on May 18, 2020, after winning the special election for Wisconsin's 7th congressional district.

== Predictions ==
Source	Ranking	As of
The Cook Political Report	Likely R	October 21, 2020

== Race summary ==
District	Incumbent				This race		
District	Member	Party	First elected	Status	Primary candidates	General election candidates	Result
2	Robert Cowles	Republican	1987	Running	Robert Cowles (Republican)	✓ Robert Cowles (Rep.)	Incumbent re-elected
4	Lena Taylor	Democratic	2004	Running	Lena Taylor (Democratic)	✓ Lena Taylor (Dem.)	Incumbent re-elected
6	La Tonya Johnson	Democratic	2016	Running	Alciro Deacon (Republican); La Tonya Johnson (Democratic); Cordelia Michelle Bryant (Democratic)	✓ La Tonya Johnson (Dem.) 88.83%; Alciro Deacon (Rep.) 11.17%	Incumbent re-elected
8	Alberta Darling	Republican	1992	Running	Alberta Darling (Republican); Neal Plotkin (Democratic)	✓ Alberta Darling (Rep.) 54.27%; Neal Plotkin (Dem.) 45.73%	Incumbent re-elected
10	Patty Schachtner	Democratic	2018 (special)	Running	Patty Schachtner (Democratic); Rob Stafsholt (Republican); Cherie Link (Republican)	✓ Rob Stafsholt (Rep) 59.92%; Patty Schachtner (Dem) 40.08%	Incumbent lost New member elected Republican gain
12	Tom Tiffany	Republican	2012	Vacant	Mary Felzkowski (Republican); Ed Vocke (Democratic)	✓ Mary Felzkowski (Rep.) 65.71%; Ed Vocke (Dem.) 34.29%	Incumbent vacated office to run for U.S. Representative; New member elected Republican hold
14	Luther Olsen	Republican	2004	Not running	Joni Anderson (Democratic); Joan Ballweg (Republican); Kenneth Van Dyke, Sr. (Republican)	✓ Joan Ballweg (Rep.) 64.91%; Joni Anderson (Dem.) 35.09%	Incumbent retired New member elected Republican hold
16	Mark F. Miller	Democratic	2004	Not running	Scott Barker (Republican); Melissa Agard (Democratic); Andrew McKinney (Democratic)	✓ Melissa Agard (Dem.) 73.5%; Scott Barker (Rep.) 26.5%	Incumbent retired New member elected Democratic hold
18	Dan Feyen	Republican	2016	Running	Dan Feyen (Republican); Aaron Wojciechowski (Democratic)	✓ Dan Feyen (Rep.) 59.13%; Aaron Wojciechowski (Dem.) 40.87%	Incumbent re-elected
20	Duey Stroebel	Republican	2014	Running	Duey Stroebel (Republican)	✓ Duey Stroebel (Rep.)	Incumbent re-elected
22	Robert Wirch	Democratic	1996	Running	Robert Wirch (Democratic)	✓ Robert Wirch (Dem.)	Incumbent re-elected
24	Patrick Testin	Republican	2016	Running	Patrick Testin (Republican); Paul Piotrowski (Democratic)	✓ Patrick Testin (Rep.) 56.47%; Paul Piotrowski (Dem) 43.53%	Incumbent re-elected
26	Fred Risser	Democratic	1962	Not running	Kelda Roys (Dem.); Brian Benford (Dem.); Amani Latimer Burris (Dem.); Nada Elmikashfi (Dem.); William Henry Davis III (Dem.); John Imes (Dem.); Aisha Moe (Dem.)	✓ Kelda Roys (Dem.)	Incumbent retired New member elected Democratic hold
28	Dave Craig	Republican	2016	Not running	Julian Bradley (Republican); Adam Murphy (Democratic); Steven Gerard Bobowski (Republican); Marina Croft (Republican); Jim Engstrand (Republican); Dan Griffin (Republican)	✓ Julian Bradley (Rep.) 59.66%; Adam Murphy (Dem.) 40.34%	Incumbent retired New member elected Republican hold
30	Dave Hansen	Democratic	2000	Not running	Jonathon Hansen (Democratic); Eric Wimberger (Republican); Sandra Jean Ewald (Democratic)	✓ Eric Wimberger (Rep.) 54.7%; Jonathon Hansen (Dem.) 45.3%	Incumbent retired New member elected Republican gain
32	Jennifer Shilling	Democratic	2011 (recall)	Vacant	Dan Kapanke (Rep.); Brad Pfaff (Dem.); Jayne Marie Swiggum (Dem.); Paul Michael Weber (Dem.)	✓ Brad Pfaff (Dem) 50.3%; Dan Kapanke (Rep.) 49.7%	Incumbent vacated office New member elected Democratic hold

== See also ==
- Voter suppression in the United States 2019–2020: Wisconsin
- 2020 Wisconsin elections
  - 2020 Wisconsin State Assembly election
  - 2020 Wisconsin Democratic presidential primary
  - 2020 Wisconsin Republican presidential primary
  - 2020 United States House of Representatives elections in Wisconsin
- 2020 United States elections
- Wisconsin Senate
- Elections in Wisconsin
