= 1996 Wisconsin Senate election =

1996 Wisconsin State Senate election
- November 5, 1996

16 of 33 seats in the Wisconsin Senate 17 seats needed for a majority
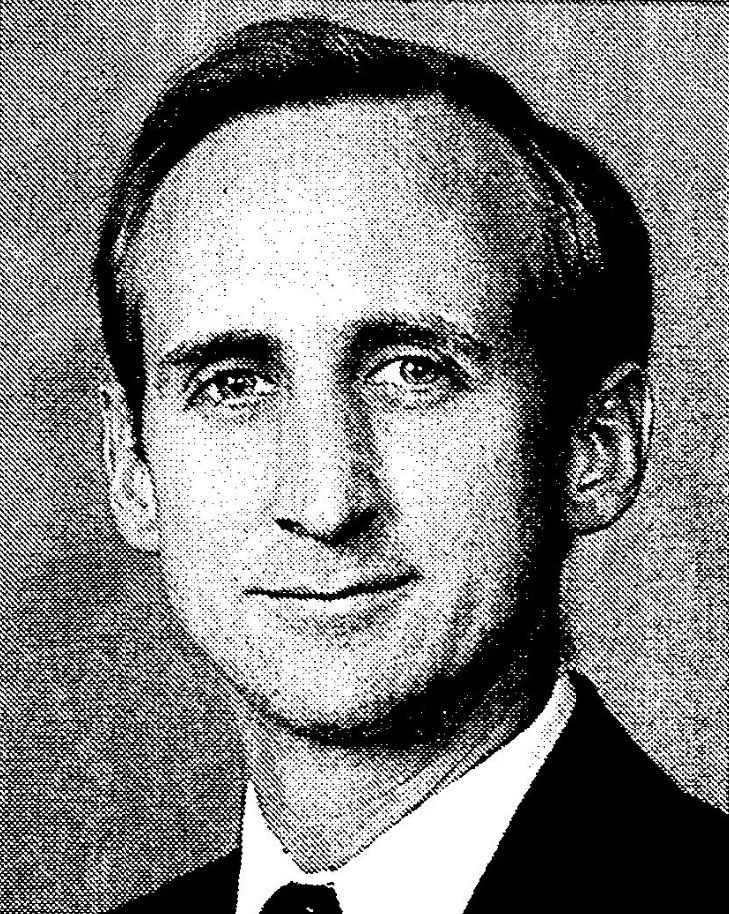

	Majority party	Minority party
Leader	Charles Chvala	Michael Ellis
Party	Democratic	Republican
Leader since	October 17, 1995	January 2, 1989
Leader's seat	16th–Madison	19th–Neenah
Last election	7 seats, TBD%	10 seats, TBD%
Seats before	17	16
Seats won	9	7
Seats after	17	16
Seat change	Steady	Steady
Popular vote	475,226	468,238
Percentage	49.25%	48.53%
- Democratic hold Republican hold No election 50–60% 80–90% >90% 50–60% 60–70% 70–80% >90% No election
President before election
Fred Risser
Democratic
Elected President
Fred Risser
Democratic

The 1996 Wisconsin Senate election were held on Tuesday, November 5, 1996. Sixteen of the 33 seats in the Wisconsin Senate were up for election—the even-numbered districts. At the time, Democrats held 17 seats while the Republicans held 16, having lost their majority only months prior due to the recalling of Senator George Petak from office.

== Summary ==
Seats		Party (majority caucus shading)		Total
Seats		Democratic	Republican	Total
Last election (1994)		7	10	17
Total after last election (1994)		16	17	33
Total before this election		17	16	33
Up for election		9	7	16
of which:	Incumbent retiring	1	0	1
of which:	Vacated	0	0	0
of which:	Unopposed	3	1	4
This election		9	7	16
Change from last election		▲2	▼3	
Total after this election		17	16	33
Change in total		Steady	Steady	

Popular vote
Democratic	49.25%
Republican	48.53%
Taxpayers	1.55%
Libertarian	0.67%

Senate seats won
Democratic	56.25%
Republican	43.75%

=== Close races ===
- State Senate district 30, 3.58%
- State Senate district 28, 4.08%
- State Senate district 10, 8.24%
- State Senate district 16, 8.97%

== Outgoing incumbents ==
=== Retiring ===
- Joseph F. Andrea (D–Kenosha), representing district 22 since 1984, decided to retire.

== Recall election ==
=== Background ===
In October 1995, Senator, George Petak, faced controversy when he changed his vote on a funding bill for the Miller Park stadium. Miller Park was being planned to replace the forty-year-old Milwaukee County Stadium and was being pushed by Republican Governor Tommy Thompson and Milwaukee Brewers owner and future-Commissioner of Baseball, Bud Selig. Petak had promised his constituents that he would vote against the bill, but changed his mind based on the belief that the Brewers would leave Wisconsin if a new stadium wasn't built.

Petak's change in vote supported a 0.1% increase in sales tax for five counties in the vicinity of the proposed stadium, which included Petak's home county of Racine. His actions caused outrage and frustration in his home district, and local Democrats were energized to collect signatures for a recall petition. After collecting 15,050 signatures, or 130% of the required 11,577 signatures, the recall was certified on March 26, 1996, and a recall election was ordered for June.

=== Petition ===
Dist.	Incumbent			Recall petition		
Dist.	Member	Party	First elected	Signatures required	Signatures approved (%)	Status
21	George Petak	Rep.	1990	11,577	15,050 (130%)	Petition certified on March 26, 1996. Recall held on June 4, 1996.

=== Results ===
Nine months after his vote on the stadium tax, Petak became the first Wisconsin state legislator to be removed from office in a recall election, when he was defeated by Democratic State Representative Kimberly Plache. As a result of the recall, control of the state Senate flipped to Democratic control for the rest of the session.

Dist.	Incumbent			This race		
Dist.	Member	Party	First elected	Primary	General	Result
21	George Petak	Republican	1990	George Petak (Rep.); William A. Pangman (Rep.); Kimberly Plache (Dem.)	▌ ✓ Kimberly Plache (Dem.) 51.22%; ▌George Petak (Rep.) 47.02%; ▌Todd Mascaretti (Lib.) 1.76%	Incumbent recalled. Democratic gain.

== Results summary ==
Dist.	Incumbent				This race (Note: Scattered votes omitted)
Dist.	Member	Party	First elected	Status	Candidates
02	Robert Cowles	Rep.	1987 (special)	Incumbent re-elected	▌ ✓ Robert Cowles (Rep.) 62.92%; ▌Patricia Buss (Dem.) 37.08%
04	Gwen Moore	Dem.	1988	Incumbent re-elected	▌ ✓ Gwen Moore (Dem.) 100%
06	Gary George	Dem.	1980	Incumbent re-elected	▌ ✓ Gary George (Dem.) 100%
08	Alberta Darling	Rep.	1992	Incumbent re-elected	▌ ✓ Alberta Darling (Rep.) 58.78%; ▌Randy Nash (Dem.) 38.62%; ▌Tim Gallert (Tax.) 2.60%
10	Alice Clausing	Dem.	1992	Incumbent re-elected	▌ ✓ Alice Clausing (Dem.) 54.12%; ▌Jay Griggs (Rep.) 45.88%
12	Roger Breske	Dem.	1990	Incumbent re-elected	▌ ✓ Roger Breske (Dem.) 57.39%; ▌Nancy Levanetz (Rep.) 42.57%
14	Robert Welch	Rep.	1995 (special)	Incumbent re-elected	▌ ✓ Robert Welch (Rep.) 100%
16	Charles Chvala	Dem.	1984	Incumbent re-elected	▌ ✓ Charles Chvala (Dem.) 53.67%; ▌Tom Metcalfe (Rep.) 44.70%; ▌Mike Oprish (Lib.) 1.63%
18	Carol Buettner	Rep.	1987 (special)	Incumbent re-elected	▌ ✓ Carol Buettner (Rep.) 73.77%; ▌Fred Frederickson (Dem.) 26.23%
20	Mary Panzer	Rep.	1993 (special)	Incumbent re-elected	▌ ✓ Mary Panzer (Rep.) 84.83%; ▌Kevin Scheunemann (Lib.) 8.18%; ▌Barry Moder (Tax.) 6.98%
22	Joseph F. Andrea	Dem.	1984	Incumbent Retiring. New member elected. Democratic hold	▌ ✓ Robert Wirch (Dem.) 56.81%; ▌Bruno Rizzo (Rep.) 43.19%
24	Kevin Shibilski	Dem.	1995 (special)	Incumbent re-elected	▌ ✓ Kevin Shibilski (Dem.) 84.08%; ▌Wayne Wiedeman (Tax.) 15.92%
26	Fred Risser	Dem.	1962 (special)	Incumbent re-elected	▌ ✓ Fred Risser (Rep.) 100%
28	Lynn Adelman	Dem.	1976	Incumbent re-elected	▌ ✓ Lynn Adelman (Dem.) 52.04%; ▌Lisa Soik (Rep.) 47.96%
30	Gary Drzewiecki	Rep.	1992	Incumbent re-elected	▌ ✓ Gary Drzewiecki (Rep.) 51.79%; ▌Barbara Lawton (Dem.) 48.21%
32	Brian Rude	Rep.	1984 (special)	Incumbent re-elected	▌ ✓ Brian Rude (Rep.) 75.10%; ▌David Wulf (Dem.) 24.90%
