= Jamie Wall (politician) =

21st century American politician

Member of the Wisconsin Senate from the 30th district
- Incumbent
- Assumed office January 6, 2025
- Preceded by: Eric Wimberger

Personal details
- Born: James Richard Wall Jr. September 7, 1971 (age 54) Green Bay, Wisconsin, U.S.
- Party: Democratic
- Education: University of Wisconsin–Madison; Oxford University
- Occupation: Consultant
- Website: Official website Campaign website

James Richard "Jamie" Wall Jr. (born September 1971) is an American business consultant and Democratic politician from Green Bay, Wisconsin. He is a member of the Wisconsin Senate, representing Wisconsin's 30th Senate district since 2025. Earlier in his career, Wall served as administrator of the Division of Economic Development in the Wisconsin Department of Commerce during Jim Doyle's first term as governor. He also ran unsuccessfully for U.S. House of Representatives in 2006 and 2012.

== Biography ==
Jamie Wall was born in Green Bay, Wisconsin, and was raised on his family's dairy farm in the nearby rural town of Holland. Wall graduated from Wrightstown High School in 1989, and was valedictorian of his class. He was the first member of his family to attend college, studying political science and history at the University of Wisconsin–Madison. He became involved in student government there and was co-president during his senior year. He was also active in campaigning on campus for Democratic Party presidential candidate Bill Clinton in the 1992 United States presidential election.

He earned his bachelor's degree in 1993, then took a six-week internship in the Office of the Vice President of the United States. He had to quit early, however, after his father became seriously ill. After his father's death in September 1993, Wall returned to politics, taking a job on Charles Chvala's 1994 campaign for governor of Wisconsin. Shortly after Chvala's defeat, Wall was announced as one of 32 Rhodes Scholarship recipients for 1995 and spent the next two years studying at Oxford University in England.

After completing his master's degree at Oxford, Wall worked in New York for management consulting firm McKinsey & Company, then joined a technology startup in Silicon Valley. He returned to Wisconsin in 2002 and partnered with a friend in establishing their own company in Green Bay, providing consulting and strategic planning services to businesses.

== Political career ==
Wall remained active in politics while conducting his consulting business. In 2002, he was involved in Jim Doyle's successful campaign for governor and was then part of Doyle's transition staff. Shortly after Doyle's inauguration, Wall was appointed to lead the Division of Economic Development in the Wisconsin Department of Commerce.

After traveling extensively around the state promoting economic development projects, Wall made his first bid for public office in 2005, when he announced his campaign for U.S. House of Representatives. He sought the Democratic nomination in Wisconsin's 8th congressional district following the announcement that incumbent Mark Green would not run for re-election in 2006. Wall had a strong start, raising $140,000 in his first quarter of fundraising and earning the endorsement of Dave Obey, the dean of the Wisconsin congressional delegation. Ultimately two other Democrats jumped into the race, former Brown County executive Nancy Nusbaum and physician Steve Kagan. Kagan prevailed in the primary, taking 47% of the vote.

Kagen served two terms until he was defeated in the 2010 election by Republican Reid Ribble. A year later, in the fall of 2011, Wall announced he would make another bid for Congress in the 2012 election, challenging Ribble in the 8th congressional district. This time Wall faced no opposition in the Democratic primary. In the general election, however, Ribble won by a comfortable margin, taking 56% of the vote.

For the next decade, Wall did not run for office again. Though, after the election of Democratic governor Tony Evers, he sought appointment as C.E.O. of the Wisconsin Economic Development Corporation, which had replaced the Department of Commerce. During these years, however, he helped found a regional non-profit economic development corporation called New North, Inc., which operates as a regional partner to the Wisconsin Economic Development Corporation for the northeast quarter of Wisconsin.

Wall returned to electoral politics in 2024, following the passage of a redistricting act undoing the decade-old Republican gerrymander of the Wisconsin Legislature. Wall announced he would run in the new 30th Senate district, comprising Green Bay, De Pere, Ashwaubenon, and Allouez. The new 30th Senate district was projected as one of the most competitive in the state, containing significant urban and suburban population. Wall faced no opposition in the Democratic primary. Although three Republican incumbents had been drawn into the new district, none of them ran in the highly competitive seat, with André Jacque seeking another office, Eric Wimberger relocating to another district, and Robert Cowles choosing to retire. Instead Wall faced Republican Jim Rafter, who had served as the village president of Allouez for the previous 8 years. Wall prevailed in the general election, receiving 52.5% of the vote and flipping the district to Democratic control. He took office in January 2025.

== Personal life and family ==
Jamie Wall is the only child of Jo Ann (née Gehl) and James R. "Jim" Wall. His father was a veteran of the Korean War, then worked as a corrections officer for 34 years. His mother was a nurse.

Their family farm in the town of Holland has been in the Wall family for five generations, since Jamie's great-great-grandfather, Irish American immigrant Richard Wall, settled there in 1855. Jamie's uncle, Jerome Wall, was chairman of the town of Holland for several years.

== Electoral history ==
=== U.S. House (2006) ===
Year	Election	Date	Elected				Defeated				Total	Plurality
2006	Primary	Sep. 12	Steve Kagen	Democratic	25,623	47.63%	Jamie Wall	Dem.	15,427	28.68%	53,797	10,196
2006	Primary	Sep. 12	Steve Kagen	Democratic	25,623	47.63%	Nancy Nusbaum	Dem.	12,731	23.66%	53,797	10,196

=== U.S. House (2012) ===
Year	Election	Date	Elected				Defeated				Total	Plurality
2012	General	Nov. 6	Reid Ribble (inc)	Republican	198,874	55.95%	Jamie Wall	Dem.	156,287	43.97%	355,464	42,587

=== Wisconsin Senate (2024) ===
Year	Election	Date	Elected				Defeated				Total	Plurality
2024	General	Nov. 5	Jamie Wall	Democratic	46,247	52.49%	Jim Rafter	Rep.	41,773	47.41%	88,106	4,474

Wisconsin Senate
Preceded by Eric Wimberger	Member of the Wisconsin Senate from the 30th district January 6, 2025 – present	Incumbent
