= 2000 Wisconsin Senate election =

2000 Wisconsin State Senate election
- November 7, 2000

16 of 33 seats in the Wisconsin Senate 17 seats needed for a majority
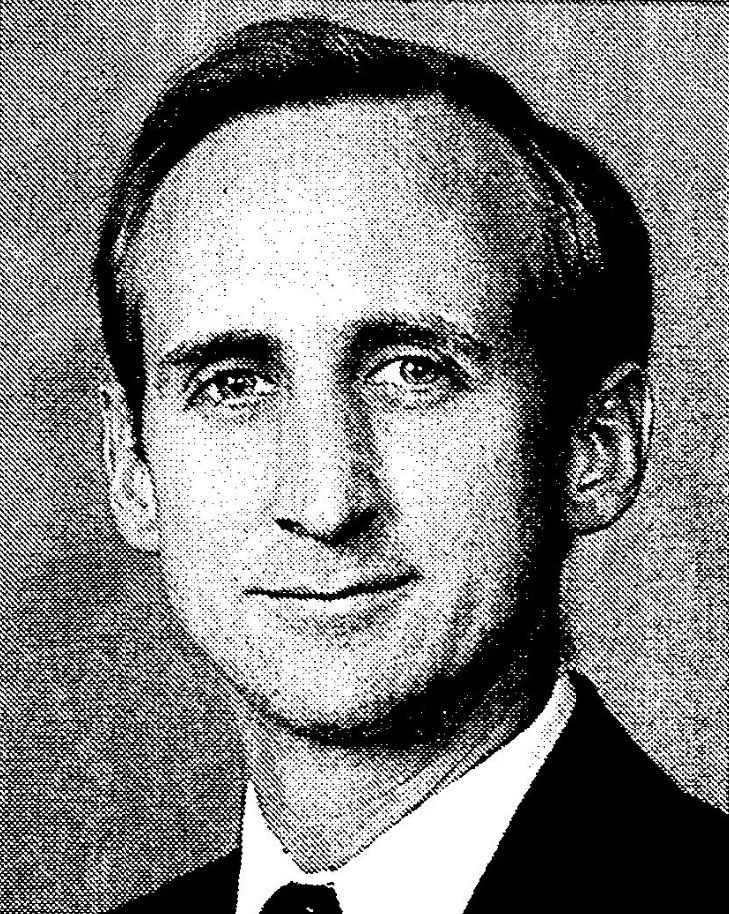

	Majority party	Minority party
Leader	Chuck Chvala	Mary Panzer
Party	Democratic	Republican
Leader since	October 17, 1995	January 25, 2000
Leader's seat	16th–Madison	20th–West Bend
Last election	9 seats, 46.13%	8 seats, 52.67%
Seats before	17	16
Seats won	9	7
Seats after	18	15
Seat change	▲1	▼1
Popular vote	604,520	521,245
Percentage	53.12%	45.81%
Swing	▲6.99%	▼6.86%
- Democratic hold Democratic gain Republican hold Republican gain No election 50–60% 80–90% >90% 50–60% 60–70% 70–80% >90% No election
President before election
Fred Risser
Democratic
Elected President
Fred Risser
Democratic

The 2000 Wisconsin Senate election was held on Tuesday November 7, 2000, at the Fall general election in Wisconsin, alongside the election to the State Assembly and other statewide and local offices. The Sixteen even-numbered seats in Wisconsin Senate were up for election. Prior to the election 17 seats were held by Democrats and 15 were held by Republicans, with one seat, formerly held by Republican Brian Rude vacant. The primary election was held on September 12, 2000.

== Summary ==
Seats		Party (majority caucus shading)		Total
Seats		Democratic	Republican	Total
Last election (1998)		8	8	16
Total after last election (1998)		17	16	33
Total before this election		17	16	33
Up for election		8	8	16
of which:	Incumbent retiring	0	0	0
of which:	Vacated	0	1	1
of which:	Unopposed	4	1	5
This election		9	7	16
Change from last election		▲1	▼1	Steady
Total after this election		18	15	33
Change in total		▲3	▼3	Steady

Party	Candidates	Votes	
Party	Candidates	No.	%
Democratic	15	604,520	44.69%
Republican	11	521,245	53.06%
Libertarian	1	7,278	0.64%
Independent	1	2,073	0.18%
Write-in	–	2,818	0.25%
Total		1,268,429	100.0%

Popular vote
Democratic	53.12%
Republican	45.81%
Libertarian	0.64%
Independent	0.18%
Scattering	0.25%

Senate seats (up)
Democratic	56.25%
Republican	43.75%

Senate seats (total)
Democratic	54.55%
Republican	45.45%

=== Close races ===
Seats where the margin of victory was under 10%:

- State Senate district 30, 1.62% (gain)
- State Senate district 32, 2.06% (gain)
- State Senate district 10, 3.19% (gain)

== Outgoing incumbents ==
=== Vacated office ===
- Brian Rude (R–Coon Valley), representing district 32 since 1984, resigned his seat on May 25, 2000.

== Candidates and results ==
Dist.	Incumbent				This race
Dist.	Member	Party	First elected	Status	Candidates
02	Robert Cowles	Republican	1987 (special)	Incumbent re-elected	▌ ✓ Robert Cowles (Rep.) 99.62%
04	Gwen Moore	Democratic	1992	Incumbent re-elected	▌ ✓ Gwen Moore (Dem.) 99.09%
06	Gary George	Democratic	1980	Incumbent re-elected	▌ ✓ Gary George (Dem.) 99.17%
08	Alberta Darling	Republican	1992	Incumbent re-elected	▌ ✓ Alberta Darling (Rep.) 65.88%; ▌Sara Lee Johann (Dem.) 33.95%
10	Alice Clausing	Democratic	1992	Incumbent lost re-election New member elected. Republican gain.	▌ ✓ Sheila Harsdorf (Rep.) 50.34%; ▌Alice Clausing (Dem.) 47.15%; ▌Jim Nelson (Ind) 2.50%
12	Roger Breske	Democratic	1992	Incumbent re-elected	▌ ✓ Roger Breske (Dem.) 88.34%; ▌John E. Bailey (Lib.) 11.54%
14	Robert Welch	Republican	1995 (special)	Incumbent re-elected	▌ ✓ Robert Welch (Rep.) 66.34%; ▌Dick Goldsmith (Dem.) 33.59%
16	Chuck Chvala	Democratic	1984	Incumbent re-elected	▌ Chuck Chvala (Dem.) 57.93%; ▌Lisa B. Nelson (Rep.) 42.01%
18	Carol Roessler	Republican	1987 (special)	Incumbent re-elected	▌ ✓ Carol Roessler (Rep.) 67.90%; ▌Kevin McGee (Dem.) 31.98%
20	Mary Panzer	Republican	1993 (special)	Incumbent re-elected	▌ ✓ Mary Panzer (Rep.) 73.03%; ▌Dale Koski (Dem.) 26.89%
22	Robert Wirch	Democratic	1996	Incumbent re-elected	▌ ✓ Robert Wirch (Dem.) 55.98%; ▌Dave Duecker (Rep.) 43.99%
24	Kevin Shibilski	Democratic	1995 (special)	Incumbent re-elected	▌ ✓ Kevin Shibilski (Dem.) 99.49%
26	Fred Risser	Democratic	1962 (special)	Incumbent re-elected	▌ ✓ Fred Risser (Rep.) 98.95%
28	Mary Lazich	Republican	1998 (special)	Incumbent re-elected	▌ ✓ Mary Lazich (Rep.) 67.48%; ▌Kathleen S. Arciszewski (Rep.) 32.46%
30	Gary Drzewiecki	Republican	1992	Incumbent lost re-election New member elected. Democratic gain.	▌ ✓ Dave Hansen (Dem.) 50.72%; ▌Gary Drzewiecki (Rep.) 49.10%
32	--Vacant (Note: Brian Rude (R) resigned May 25, 2000)--			Previous incumbent resigned New member elected. Democratic gain.	▌ ✓ Mark Meyer (Dem.) 50.96%; ▌Dan Kapanke (Rep.) 48.90%

== See also ==
- 2000 Wisconsin elections
  - 2000 Wisconsin State Assembly election
- 2000 United States elections
- Elections in Wisconsin
- Wisconsin Senate
