= Eric Wimberger =

21st century American politician (born 1979)

Member of the Wisconsin Senate
- Incumbent
- Assumed office January 6, 2025
- Preceded by: Robert Cowles
- Constituency: 2nd district
- In office January 4, 2021 – January 6, 2025
- Preceded by: Dave Hansen
- Succeeded by: Jamie Wall
- Constituency: 30th district

Personal details
- Born: April 2, 1979 (age 47) Green Bay, Wisconsin, U.S.
- Party: Republican
- Education: St. Cloud State University (B.S.); Marquette Law School (J.D.)
- Profession: Lawyer, politician
- Website: Official website; Campaign website

Military service
- Allegiance: United States
- Branch/service: United States Marine Corps
- Years of service: 2006–2010
- Rank: Captain, USMC
- Unit: Judge Advocate Division

Eric Wimberger (born April 2, 1979) is an American lawyer and Republican politician from De Pere, Wisconsin. He is a member of the Wisconsin Senate, representing Wisconsin's 2nd Senate district since January 2025; he previously represented the 30th Senate district from 2021 until 2025. Earlier in his career, he served as a United States Marine Corps officer for four years in the Judge Advocate Division.

== Early life and career ==
Eric Wimberger was born in 1979 in Green Bay, Wisconsin, and raised in neighboring De Pere. After graduating from high school, he attended St. Cloud State University in St. Cloud, Minnesota, earning his bachelor's degree in criminal justice in 2001. Following his undergraduate education, Wimberger spent a year employed as a truck driver for Schneider National, a long-haul trucking company, logging more than 120,000 miles.

He entered Marquette University Law School in 2002. After earning his J.D. in 2005, Wimberger received a commission with the United States Marine Corps. He spent four years in the Marine Corps, working in the Judge Advocate Division in Japan and Washington, D.C. He was honorably discharged in 2010 as a captain.

After his discharge, he returned to the Green Bay area and started a legal practice there.

== Political career ==
Wimberger made his first attempt at elected office in 2014, when he ran for Wisconsin State Assembly, challenging first-term Democratic incumbent Eric Genrich in the Green Bay-based 90th Assembly district. Despite a strong performance statewide by the Republican Party, Genrich prevailed in the general election with nearly 55% of the vote.

Two years later Wimberger made another attempt, this time challenging 16-year incumbent state senator Dave Hansen in the 30th State Senate district. Wimberger again fell short in the general election, but made a strong showing with nearly 49% of the vote.

In January 2020, Senator Hansen announced he would not seek re-election to a sixth term in 2020. Wimberger announced in April that he would make another run for the now-open state Senate seat. Wimberger was unopposed in the Republican primary and faced Hansen's nephew, De Pere alderman Jonathon Hansen, in the general election. The 30th Senate district was one of the most heavily contested elections in the state, with outside political action committees spending nearly $1,000,000 on both sides of the race. In one example, Wimberger's legal career came under fire from the Democratic PAC A Better Wisconsin, Together. One advertisement attacked Wimberger for his defense of a man accused of 213 counts of possessing child pornography. Another ad attacked him for his treatment of a teenage victim while he was defense counsel for a group of American Marines accused of raping her. Wimberger asserted that he was only doing his job—providing a vigorous defense for the accused.

Wimberger prevailed with 54% of the vote, one of two state Senate pickups for the Republicans in the 2020 election. Since 2023, Wimberger has been a member of the Legislature's powerful budget-writing Joint Finance Committee.

In 2024, the Wisconsin Legislature enacted a new redistricting law, after the Wisconsin Supreme Court struck down the previous map. The Green Bay metropolitan area was significantly affected, as the previous Republican maps had intentionally divided the metro area among three different Senate districts in a manner to dilute the Democratic votes there. Under the new maps, Wimberger's district—the 30th—took on most of the city of Green Bay, and its suburban neighbors Ashwaubenon, Allouez, Bellevue, and De Pere; all three incumbent Republican state senators in the region were drawn into the 30th district. The 30th district was also projected to be highly competitive under the new maps. Wimberger announced that he would establish residency in the neighboring 2nd Senate district, where the incumbent, Robert Cowles, later announced his retirement. Wimberger faced no opponent in the Republican primary and easily prevailed in the general election in the overwhelmingly Republican district.

== Personal life and family ==
Eric Wimberger lives in De Pere, Wisconsin. In addition to his legal work, he is a board member of the philanthropic Cloud Family Foundation. His mother, Wendy Wimberger, owns the Sweet Memories Candy Shoppe in Lakewood, Wisconsin.

== Electoral history ==
=== Wisconsin Assembly (2014) ===
Year	Election	Date	Elected				Defeated				Total	Plurality
2014	General	Nov. 4	Eric Genrich (inc)	Democratic	7,953	54.94%	Eric Wimberger	Rep.	5,342	36.90%	14,477	2,611
2014	General	Nov. 4	Eric Genrich (inc)	Democratic	7,953	54.94%	Shae Sortwell	Ind.	1,164	8.04%	14,477	2,611

=== Wisconsin Senate, 30th district (2016, 2020) ===
Year	Election	Date	Elected				Defeated				Total	Plurality
2016	General	Nov. 8	Dave Hansen (inc)	Democratic	40,214	51.27%	Eric Wimberger	Rep.	38,175	48.67%	78,436	2,039
2020	General	Nov. 3	Eric Wimberger	Republican	47,948	54.65%	Jonathon Hansen	Dem.	39,711	45.26%	87,733	8,237

=== Wisconsin Senate, 2nd district (2024) ===
Year	Election	Date	Elected				Defeated				Total	Plurality
2024	General	Nov. 5	Eric Wimberger (inc)	Republican	67,979	64.46%	Kelly Peterson	Dem.	37,430	35.49%	105,459	30,549

Wisconsin Senate
Preceded by Dave Hansen	Member of the Wisconsin Senate from the 30th district January 4, 2021 – January 6, 2025	Succeeded by Jamie Wall
Preceded by Robert Cowles	Member of the Wisconsin Senate from the 2nd district January 6, 2025 – present	Incumbent
