= Alberta Darling =

American politician (born 1944)

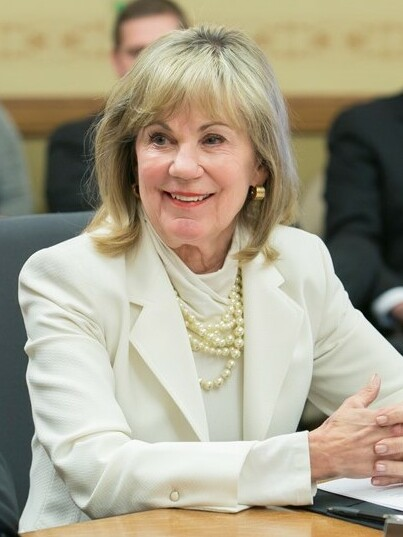
- Darling in 2018

Member of the Wisconsin Senate from the 8th district
- In office January 4, 1993 – December 1, 2022
- Preceded by: Joseph Czarnezki
- Succeeded by: Dan Knodl

Member of the Wisconsin State Assembly from the 10th district
- In office May 15, 1990 – January 4, 1993
- Preceded by: Betty Jo Nelsen
- Succeeded by: Annette Polly Williams

Personal details
- Born: Alberta Statkus; April 28, 1944 (age 82) Hammond, Indiana, U.S.
- Party: Republican
- Spouse: William Darling (m. 1967; died 2015)
- Children: 2
- Education: University of Wisconsin–Madison (B.S.)
- Profession: Teacher, Marketing Director

Alberta Darling (née Statkus; born April 28, 1944) is a retired American educator and Republican politician from Milwaukee County, Wisconsin. She served nearly 30 years as a member of the Wisconsin Senate, representing Wisconsin's 8th Senate district from 1993 through 2022. During her long career in the Senate, she served 11 years as Senate co-chair of the Wisconsin Legislature's powerful budget-writing Joint Finance Committee (2003–2004; 2011–2012; 2013–2020). Her constituency included many of the suburban municipalities directly north and northwest of Milwaukee and some northern parts of the city of Milwaukee. Before being elected to the Senate, she served about three years in the Wisconsin State Assembly (1990–1993).

== Personal life and education ==
Darling was born Alberta Statkus in Hammond, Indiana; she was raised in Peoria, Illinois, where she graduated from Richwoods High School. She attended the University of Wisconsin–Madison, receiving a Bachelor of Science degree in secondary education in 1966. After graduating from UW-Madison, she moved to Milwaukee and did graduate work at the University of Wisconsin–Milwaukee from 1972 to 1974.

Prior to her election to the legislature, Darling taught high school English and was later the marketing and business development director for the Milwaukee Art Museum.

Darling met her husband, William "Bill" Darling, during their time at UW-Madison. The two married in 1967, and up until his death in the spring of 2015, Bill was an ear, nose and throat surgeon in southeast Wisconsin. Darling and her husband had two children and three grandchildren. She is a longtime resident of River Hills, Wisconsin, which she represented in the Senate.

== Wisconsin State Legislature ==
Darling first joined the Wisconsin State Legislature by winning a special election in 1990 for the 10th district, defeating Rick Graber in the primary. She served the remainder of the term and a full two-year term in the State Assembly before being elected in 1992 to the State Senate, a seat she has held ever since. Darling faced a contentious election in 2008, though she fended off a challenge from State Representative Sheldon Wasserman by a mere percentage point and would go unopposed in the next two regular election cycles in 2012 and 2016. In 2020, Darling faced a challenge from Neal Plotkin, a sales representative and substitute teacher from Glendale. The race was heavily targeted by Democrats amidst eroding support for Republicans in suburban districts, and Darling was outspent as Plotkin was boosted by a significant edge in outside spending. However, Darling won re-election by eight percentage points (a margin nearly identical to the 2011 recall) as she garnered split-ticket support among Joe Biden voters to secure a comfortable win despite a razor-thin 167-vote margin in the presidential election in her district. Throughout her tenure in the Legislature, Darling has earned a reputation as a fiscal conservative with moderate views on some issues. She endorsed Ted Cruz over Donald Trump in the 2016 Republican presidential primary.

From 2000 to 2021, she served on the influential Joint Finance Committee (responsible for the state budget) and notably served as the longtime Senate co-chair. Her six sessions chairing the committee is tied for most in state history. During the 2021–2023 legislative session, Darling chaired the Committee on Education, served as the Vice-Chair of the Committee on Elections, Election Process Reform and Ethics and also served on the Committee on Judiciary and Public Safety, the Committee on Universities and Technical Colleges, the Joint Survey Committee on Retirement Systems, and the Joint Legislative Council. She is also a member of the Wisconsin State Fair Park Board and the Wisconsin Center District.

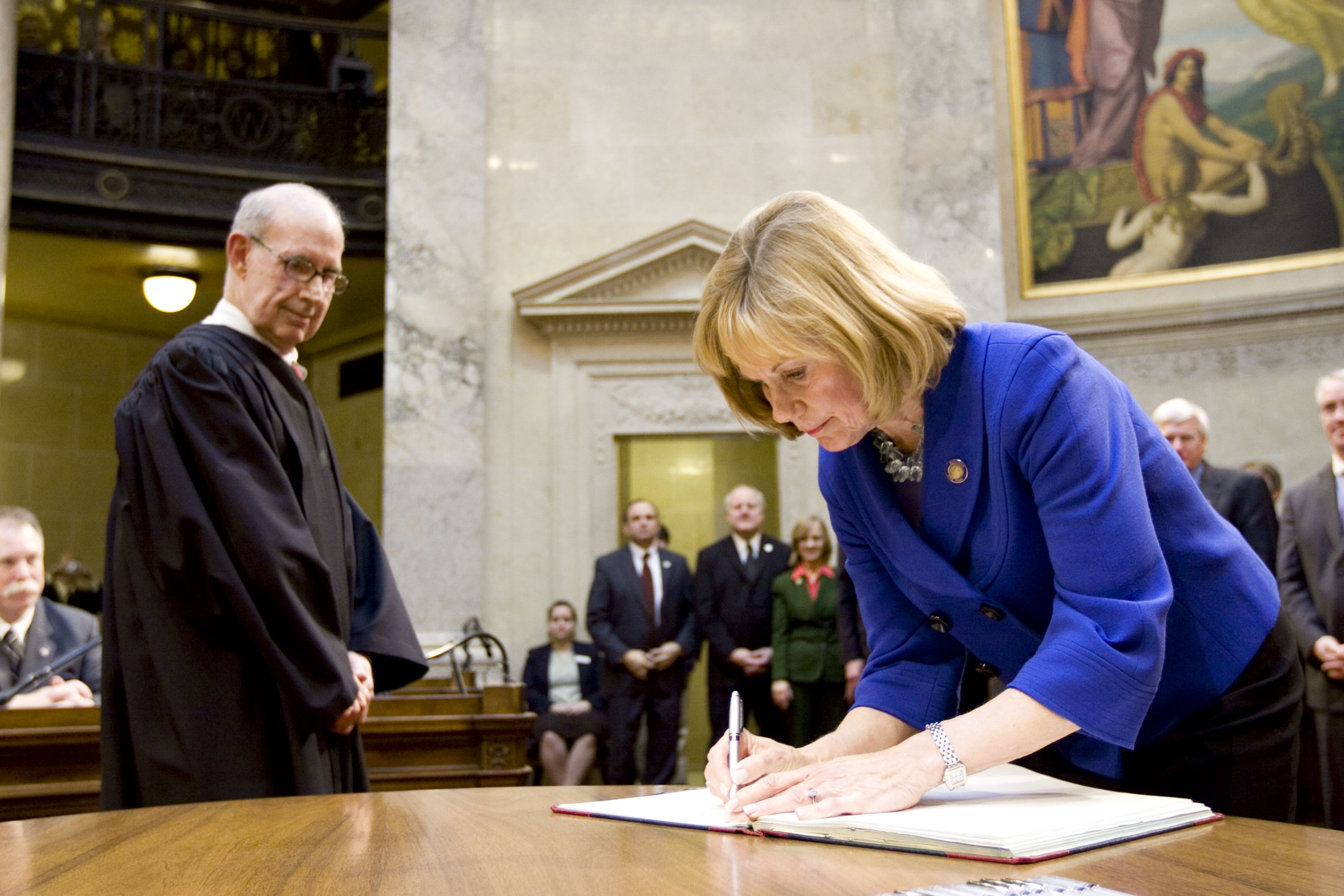
Darling during the senate's 2009 inauguration

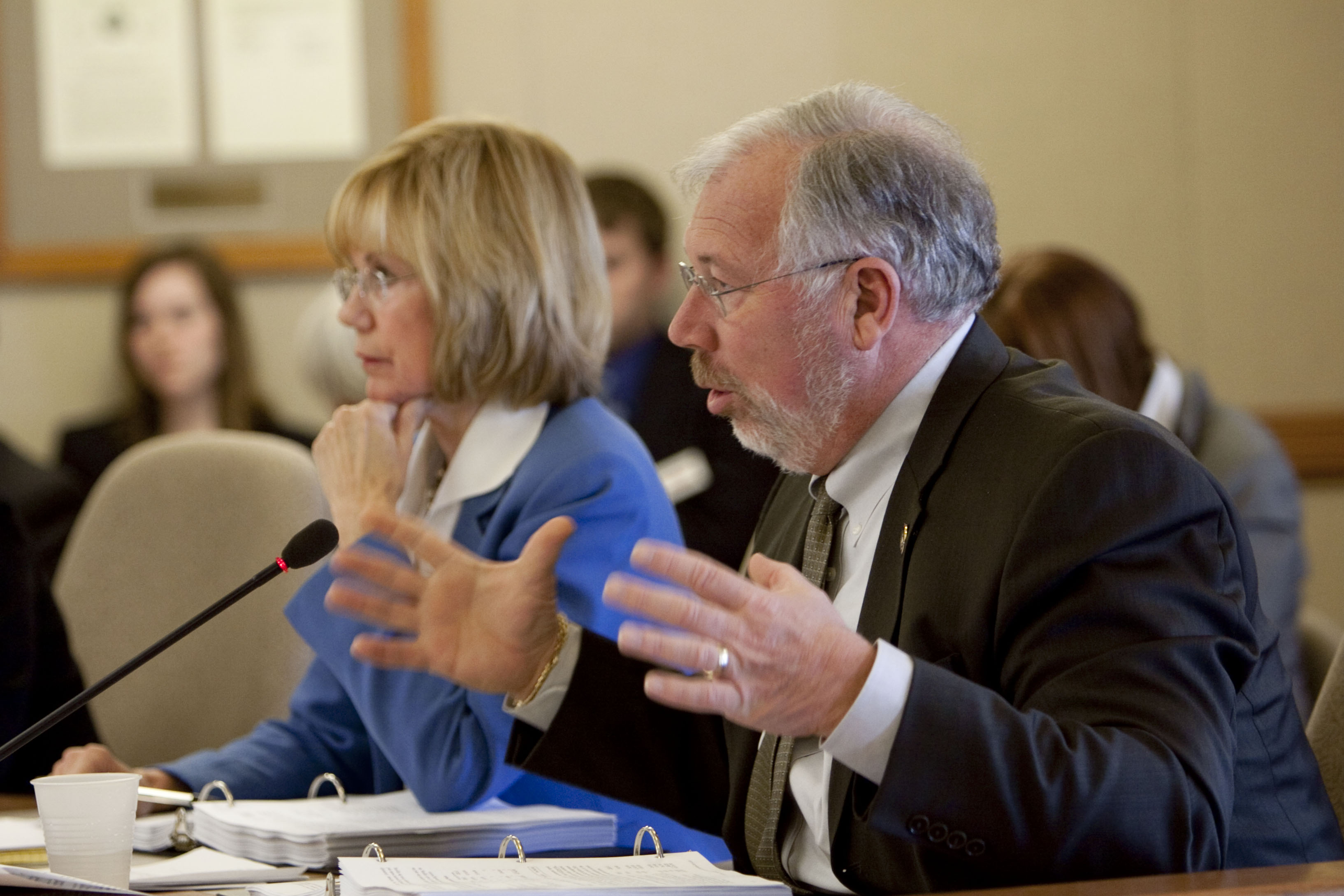
Darling and Sen. Luther Olsen participate in a 2009 committee meeting

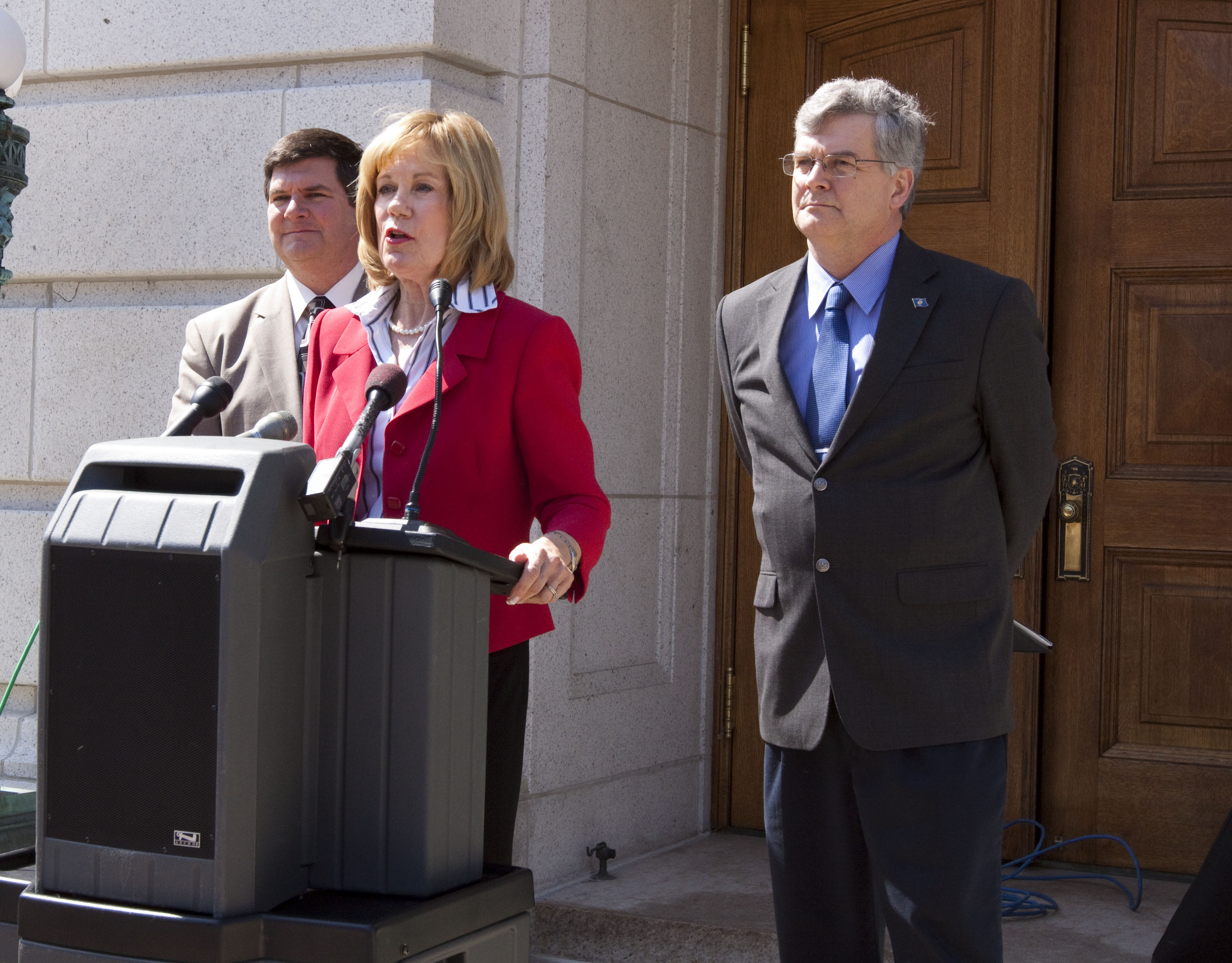
Darling (center) in 2009 with State Senator Pat Kreitlow (left) and State Representative Jeff Smith (right)

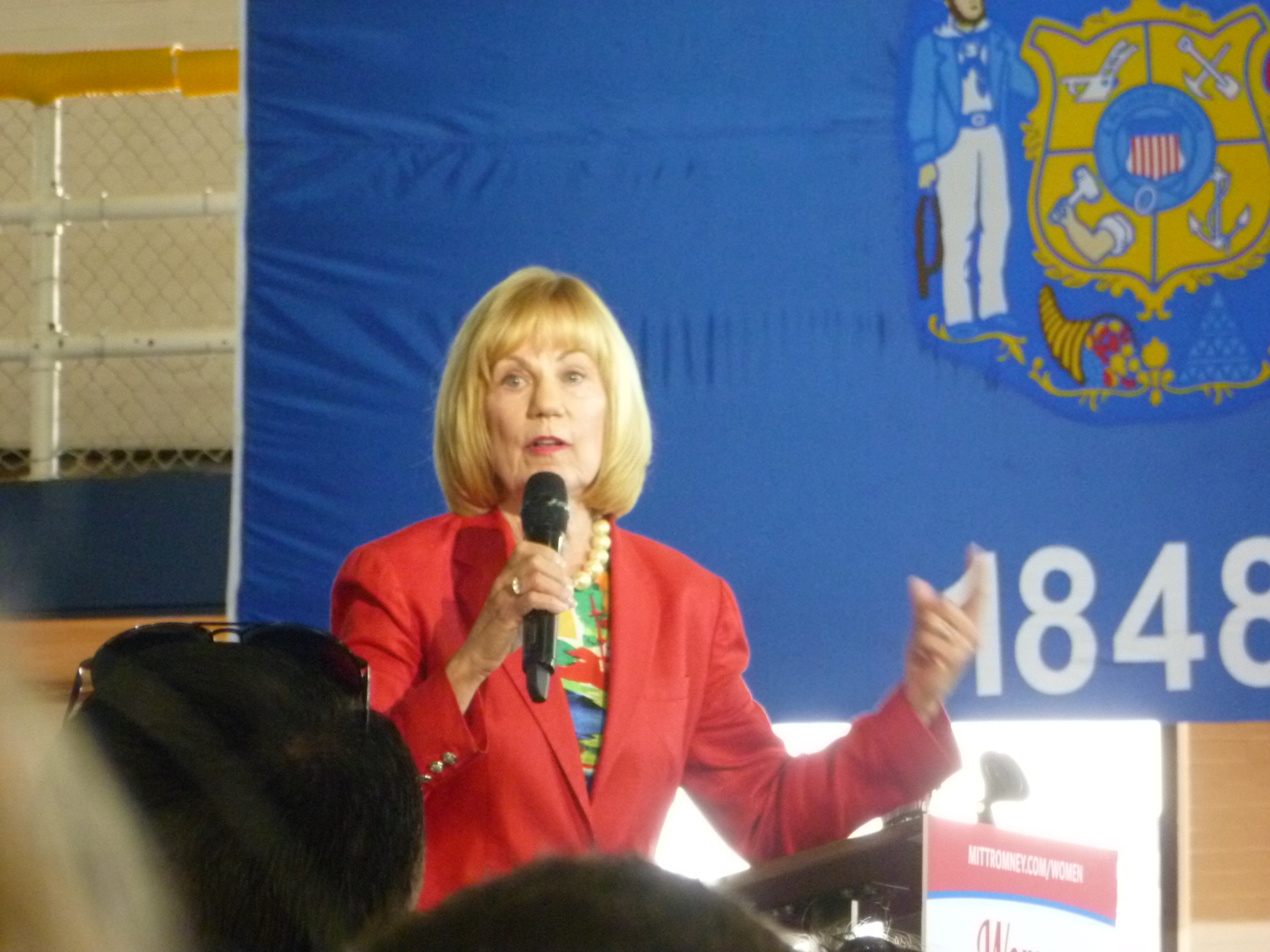
Darling campaign for Republican presidential nominee Mitt Romney for the 2012 presidential election

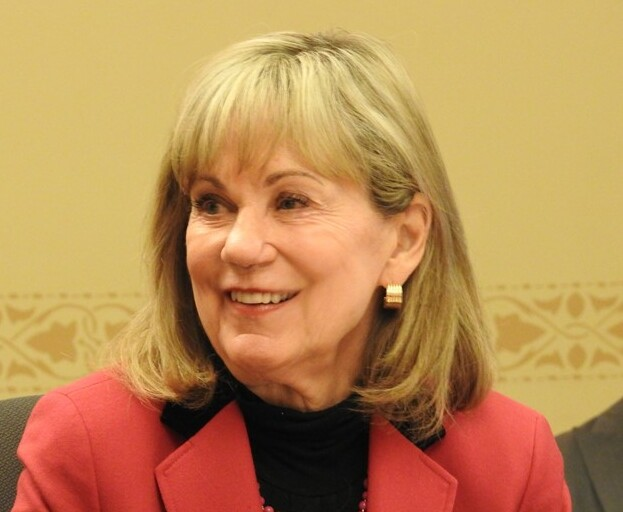
Darling in 2019

== 2011 recall ==
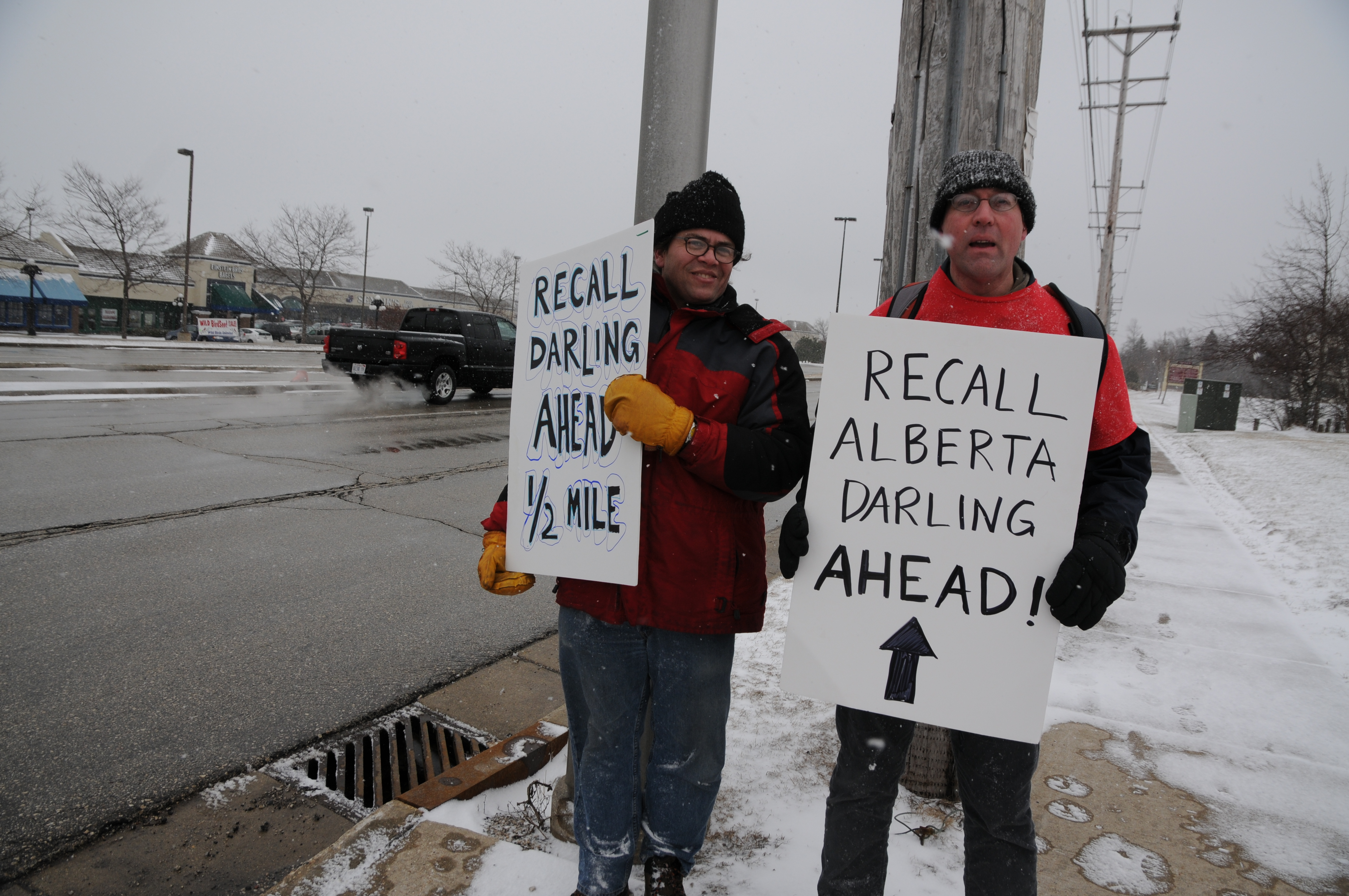
Opponents of Darling collecting signatures for her recall

Darling was one of nine Senators (six Republicans and three Democrats) to face a recall election effort in 2011 following the enactment of 2011 Wisconsin Act 10. On March 2, 2011, the "Committee to Recall Darling" officially registered with the Wisconsin Government Accountability Board and on April 20, 2011, the recall campaigns announced that they had gathered nearly 30,000 signatures – enough to trigger a recall election. The 8th Senate District was considered a heavy target for Democrats and outside spending, yet Darling would defeat Democratic challenger Sandy Pasch by a larger margin than she had won in 2008; 54 percent to 46 percent. The election was notably the last race to be called with the balance of the Senate and the ultimate fate of Republican reforms at stake, and received national coverage on election night as a result.

== Electoral history ==
=== Wisconsin Assembly (1990) ===
Year	Election	Date	Elected				Defeated				Total	Plurality
1990 (special)	Primary	Apr. 3	Alberta Darling	Republican	6,403	50.33%	Timothy D. Lawless	Rep.	4,481	35.22%	12,723	1,922
1990 (special)	Primary	Apr. 3	Alberta Darling	Republican	6,403	50.33%	Richard W. Graber	Rep.	1,839	14.45%	12,723	1,922
1990 (special)	Special	May 1	Alberta Darling	Republican	668	100.0%					668	668
1990	General	Nov. 6	Alberta Darling (inc)	Republican	12,572	73.25%	William R. Boyd	Dem.	4,591	26.75%	17,163	7,981

=== Wisconsin Senate (1992–2020) ===
Year	Election	Date	Elected				Defeated				Total	Plurality
1992	General	Nov. 3	Alberta Darling	Republican	55,130	67.41%	William C. Whitten	Dem.	26,656	32.59%	81,786	28,474
1996	General	Nov. 5	Alberta Darling (inc)	Republican	45,244	58.78%	Randy Nash	Dem.	29,728	38.62%	76,975	15,516
1996	General	Nov. 5	Alberta Darling (inc)	Republican	45,244	58.78%	Tim Gallert	Tax.	2,003	2.60%	76,975	15,516
2000	General	Nov. 7	Alberta Darling (inc)	Republican	57,041	65.88%	Sara Lee Johann	Dem.	29,396	33.95%	86,581	27,645
2004	General	Nov. 2	Alberta Darling (inc)	Republican	55,731	56.94%	Jennifer Morales	Dem.	42,048	42.96%	97,879	13,683
2008	General	Nov. 4	Alberta Darling (inc)	Republican	50,125	50.46%	Sheldon Wasserman	Dem.	49,118	49.45%	99,328	1,007
2011	Recall	Aug. 9	Alberta Darling (inc)	Republican	39,449	53.62%	Sandy Pasch	Dem.	34,071	46.31%	73,576	5,378
2012	General	Nov. 6	Alberta Darling (inc)	Republican	76,402	95.58%					79,934	72,870
2016	General	Nov. 8	Alberta Darling (inc)	Republican	77,331	95.51%					80,966	73,696
2020	General	Nov. 3	Alberta Darling (inc)	Republican	64,906	54.24%	Neal Plotkin	Dem.	54,693	45.70%	119,666	10,213

Wisconsin State Assembly
Preceded by Betty Jo Nelsen	Member of the Wisconsin State Assembly from the 10th district May 15, 1990 – January 4, 1993	Succeeded by Annette Polly Williams
Wisconsin Senate
Preceded by Joseph Czarnezki	Member of the Wisconsin Senate from the 8th district January 4, 1993 – December 1, 2022	Succeeded by Dan Knodl
