= Robert Cowles =

American politician (born 1950)

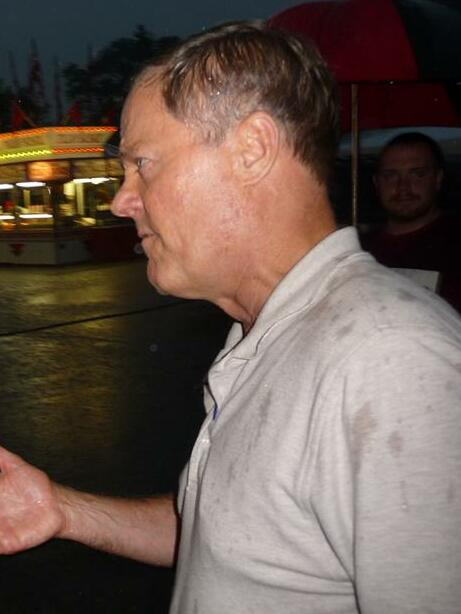
- Cowles in 2011

Member of the Wisconsin Senate from the 2nd district
- In office April 21, 1987 – January 6, 2025
- Preceded by: Don Hanaway
- Succeeded by: Eric Wimberger

Member of the Wisconsin State Assembly
- In office January 7, 1985 – April 21, 1987
- Preceded by: Gus Menos
- Succeeded by: James R. Charneski
- Constituency: 6th Assembly district
- In office January 3, 1983 – January 7, 1985
- Preceded by: Patricia Spafford Smith
- Succeeded by: Mary Hubler
- Constituency: 75th Assembly district

Personal details
- Born: Robert Lewis Cowles III; July 31, 1950 (age 76) Green Bay, Wisconsin, U.S.
- Party: Republican; Democratic (before 1980)
- Spouse: Rebecca St. Clair (div. 2003)
- Education: University of Wisconsin–Green Bay (BS)
- Website: https://legis.wisconsin.gov/senate/02/cowles/

Robert Lewis Cowles III (born July 31, 1950) is a retired American Republican politician from Green Bay, Wisconsin. He served 38 years as a member of the Wisconsin Senate, representing Wisconsin's 2nd Senate district from 1987 to 2025. Before being elected to the Senate, he served four years in the Wisconsin State Assembly (1983–1987).

== Early life and education ==
Robert Cowles was born and raised and lived most of his life in Green Bay, Wisconsin. He attended the University of Wisconsin–Green Bay, earning his bachelor's degree in math and science in 1975. After graduating, he briefly pursued his master's in public administration at University of Wisconsin–Green Bay, but did not complete that degree.

He was formerly a director of an alternative energy division for a communications construction company.

== Early political career ==
Despite his parents being prominent local Republicans, Cowles became active in politics with the Democratic Party during his college years. In 1974, he was a campaign co-chairman for unsuccessful Democratic Wisconsin State Assembly candidate Jon A. LeDuc. During the 1976 Democratic Party presidential primaries he was an organizer in Wisconsin for Arizona U.S. representative Mo Udall's presidential campaign. He was also active in the United States Junior Chamber, and was president of the group in 1977.

In 1978, Cowles made his first bid for state elected office. He ran for Wisconsin State Assembly in what was then the 4th Assembly district; in the Democratic primary, he faced the candidate he had previously worked for, Jon A. LeDuc, who was then making his third bid for election to the Assembly. Cowles and LeDuc ran on nearly identical policy platforms, both arguing for cuts to state bureaucracy and both proposing a plan for indexing the state income tax to inflation. For Wisconsin's then-surplus, they also both advocated sending the money to municipalities in shared revenue as part of a program for municipalities to cut property taxes. Cowles prevailed in the primary, receiving 57% of the vote, but was defeated in the general election by Republican Gary T. Dilweg.

After losing the 1978 election, Cowles reduced his political activity and re-emerged in 1982 as a Republican. On his party-change, he explained that he found the Republican Party better fit his conservative political philosophy.

That year, he ran for Assembly again in what was then the 75th Assembly district under the 1982 court-ordered redistricting plan. He faced two opponents in the Republican primary, but prevailed with 50% of the vote. He went on to defeat Democrat Joel Edler in the general election, receiving 56% of the vote. Another redistricting act was passed in 1983, Cowles ran for his second term in 1984 in what was then the 6th Assembly district. He prevailed in another contested primary, and went on to defeat Democrat Gregory Kirschling in the general election.

== Wisconsin Senate ==
While Cowles was being re-elected to the assembly in 1986, his district's state senator, Don Hanaway, was being elected Attorney General of Wisconsin. Hanaway still had two years remaining on his term in the Wisconsin Senate, and therefore a special election was called for the spring of 1987 to fill the vacancy in the 2nd Senate district. Cowles was one of four Republicans who entered the special primary to succeed Hanaway, he went on to win the primary with 41% of the vote over state representative Cathy Zeuske and former representative William J. Rogers. In the general election, he defeated Democrat Rosemary Hinkfuss. Since the 1987 special election, Cowles has been re-elected nine times and survived one recall election.

In the 106th Wisconsin Legislature, Cowles chairs the Senate Committee on Natural Resources and Energy; he has been chair of the Senate committee dealing with energy legislation since 2011, and also held the chair multiple times when Republicans held the majority between 1993 and 2006. (Note: Previous iterations of committees dealing with energy where Cowles served included the "Senate Committee on Energy, Consumer Protection, and Government Reform" (2013), "Senate Committee on Energy, Biotechnology, and Consumer Protection" (2011), "Senate Committee on Energy, Utilities and Information Technology" (2005), "Senate Committee on Energy and Utilities" (2003), "Senate Committee on Environment and Energy" (1995)) He also previously served as co-chair of the Joint Committee on Audit, and he sits on the Senate Committee on Transportation and Local Government; he has sat on the committee responsible for transportation issues since 2013.

=== Recall effort ===
At the start of the 100th Wisconsin Legislature, Cowles supported Governor Scott Walker's controversial "budget repair bill," which passed into law as 2011 Wisconsin Act 10 after months of intense partisan controversy and protest. Much of the controversy was caused by a provision of the law which removed the rights of public employee unions to engage in collective bargaining with state and municipal governments. The law's passage launched a state-wide effort to recall state elected officials who had supported the bill, and Cowles was one of the state senators targeted in that recall effort.

March 2, 2011, the "Committee to Recall Cowles" registered with the Wisconsin Government Accountability Board. On April 28, roughly 26,000 signatures to recall Cowles were filed with the Government Accountability Board. In late May 2011, the Wisconsin Government Accountability Board verified petitions against Cowles. The recall election was held on August 9, 2011, with Cowles defeating the Democratic challenger, Nancy Nusbaum, 60 percent to 40 percent.

=== Retirement ===
The 2024 redistricting act substantially redrew the maps in the Green Bay area. Cowles was drawn out of his 2nd Senate district seat and into the 30th Senate district with two other incumbent Republican state senators. Cowles initially announced he would relocate to the new 2nd Senate district, but later announced that he would retire and end his 42-year legislative career.

Just before the 2024 election, Cowles announced that he would vote for the Democratic Party presidential nominee, Kamala Harris, and stated that Donald Trump "has to be defeated". In announcing his decision, Cowles said, "I really think this is one of the most important things I've done... Cowles made this announcement in an episode of the Civic Media show, “Rational Revolution,” hosted by Mark Becker on October 24, 2024, Just before the Presidential Election, hoping to move the Needle. Cowles Said I believe this guy Trump is a Totalitarian and very much a Fascist,” said Cowles. The big picture that really came to me in recent days, in the last week, is thinking about thinking about fascism in World War II, and members of my own family that fought the fascists both in Japan and Germany, and all the guys that are buried all over the place of this country, in Arlington, he said. During the Radio show, Becker played a clip from Liz Cheney’s recent speech in Ripon, Wisconsin, endorsing Harris, and Cowles talked about agreeing with all of what she had to say. Hopefully, people will accept that and listen to me, those that have trusted me and believed in me will think about that, and if they're undecided, that we have to make a change here... Trump has to be defeated, and we have to protect the Constitution. And the country will go on, even with some liberal things that Harris might do, or might not do... You have to have the foundation of the Constitution, to protect democracy. If you don't have that, we will disappear."

== Personal life and family ==
Robert Cowles III is the eldest of three sons born to Robert Cowles Jr. and his wife Margaret (née Lindstrom). Robert Cowles Jr. was a mechanical engineer and a co-founder of Marathon Engineering; he was also an original shareholder in the Green Bay Packers. His father, Robert Cowles Sr., was a prominent physician and civic leader in Green Bay.

Through his paternal grandmother, Emily Cone Harris (née Murphy) Cowles, Cowles was an heir to a portion of the ownership of Horseshoe Bay Farms, Door County Wisconsin, Penobscot Mines Minnesota, The Pacific Lumber Company California, The Morley-Murphy Company, founded by her father, Frank Emery Murphy. Her uncle, William Herbert Murphy, was also a prominent businessman, and was one of the founders of the Lincoln Motor Company.

== Electoral history ==
=== Wisconsin Assembly, 4th district (1978) ===
Year	Election	Date	Elected				Defeated				Total	Plurality
1978	Primary	Sep. 12	Robert L. Cowles III	Democratic	1,908	57.37%	Jon A. LeDuc	Dem.	1,418	42.63%	3,326	490
1978	General	Nov. 7	Gary T. Dilweg	Republican	9,963	57.48%	Robert L. Cowles III	Dem.	7,369	42.52%	17,332	2,594

=== Wisconsin Assembly, 75th district (1982) ===
Year	Election	Date	Elected				Defeated				Total	Plurality
1982	Primary	Sep. 14	Robert L. Cowles III	Republican	1,960	50.20%	J. Roger Dernbach	Rep.	1,368	35.04%	3,904	592
1982	Primary	Sep. 14	Robert L. Cowles III	Republican	1,960	50.20%	Phyllis J. Kates	Rep.	576	14.75%	3,904	592
1982	General	Nov. 2	Robert L. Cowles III	Republican	9,235	56.71%	Joel Edler	Dem.	7,049	43.29%	16,284	2,186

=== Wisconsin Assembly, 6th district (1984, 1986) ===
Year	Election	Date	Elected				Defeated				Total	Plurality
1984	Primary	Sep. 11	Robert L. Cowles III	Republican	3,492	71.51%	Dudley D. Birder Jr.	Rep.	1,391	28.49%	4,883	2,101
1984	General	Nov. 6	Robert L. Cowles III	Republican	13,876	64.93%	Gregory J. Kirschling	Dem.	7,495	35.07%	21,371	6,381
1986	General	Nov. 4	Robert L. Cowles III (inc)	Republican	11,398	67.30%	Daniel L. Olejniczak	Dem.	5,539	32.70%	16,937	5,859

=== Wisconsin Senate (1987–2020) ===
Year	Election	Date	Elected				Defeated				Total	Plurality
1987 (special)	Primary	Feb. 17	Robert L. Cowles III	Republican	7,545	41.45%	Cathy Zeuske	Rep.	6,899	37.90%	18,203	646
1987 (special)	Primary	Feb. 17	Robert L. Cowles III	Republican	7,545	41.45%	Herbert Sandmire	Rep.	2,046	11.24%	18,203	646
1987 (special)	Primary	Feb. 17	Robert L. Cowles III	Republican	7,545	41.45%	William J. Rogers	Rep.	1,713	9.41%	18,203	646
1987 (special)	Special	Apr. 7	Robert L. Cowles III	Republican	23,297	55.46%	Rosemary Hinkfuss	Dem.	18,713	44.54%	42,010	4,584
1988	General	Nov. 8	Robert L. Cowles III (inc)	Republican	37,028	59.35%	Frederick C. Thurston	Dem.	25,361	40.65%	62,389	11,667
1992	General	Nov. 3	Robert L. Cowles III (inc)	Republican	40,570	58.05%	Patricia J. Buss	Dem.	29,324	41.95%	69,894	11,246
1996	General	Nov. 5	Robert L. Cowles III (inc)	Republican	40,467	62.92%	Patricia J. Buss	Dem.	23,849	37.08%	64,316	16,618
2000	General	Nov. 7	Robert L. Cowles III (inc)	Republican	55,223	99.62%	--unopposed--				55,434	55,012
2004	General	Nov. 2	Robert L. Cowles III (inc)	Republican	60,546	89.13%	Roy Leyendecker	Lib.	7,288	10.73%	67,929	53,258
2008	General	Nov. 4	Robert L. Cowles III (inc)	Republican	60,507	99.35%	--unopposed--				60,900	60,114
2011	Recall	Aug. 9	Robert L. Cowles III (inc)	Republican	27,037	57.44%	Nancy J. Nusbaum	Dem.	19,974	42.43%	47,073	7,063
2012	General	Nov. 6	Robert L. Cowles III (inc)	Republican	64,192	98.54%	--unopposed--				65,143	63,241
2016	General	Nov. 8	Robert L. Cowles III (inc)	Republican	57,269	65.00%	John N. Powers	Dem.	30,796	34.95%	88,109	26,473
2020	General	Nov. 3	Robert L. Cowles III (inc)	Republican	80,602	98.33%	--unopposed--				81,968	79,236

== Notes ==
Wisconsin State Assembly
Preceded by Patricia Spafford Smith	Member of the Wisconsin State Assembly from the 75th district January 3, 1983 – January 7, 1985	Succeeded by Mary Hubler
Preceded by Gus Menos	Member of the Wisconsin State Assembly from the 6th district January 7, 1985 – April 21, 1987	Succeeded by James R. Charneski
Wisconsin Senate
Preceded by Don Hanaway	Member of the Wisconsin Senate from the 2nd district April 21, 1987 – January 6, 2025	Succeeded by Eric Wimberger
