= Luther Olsen =

American politician

Luther S. Olsen
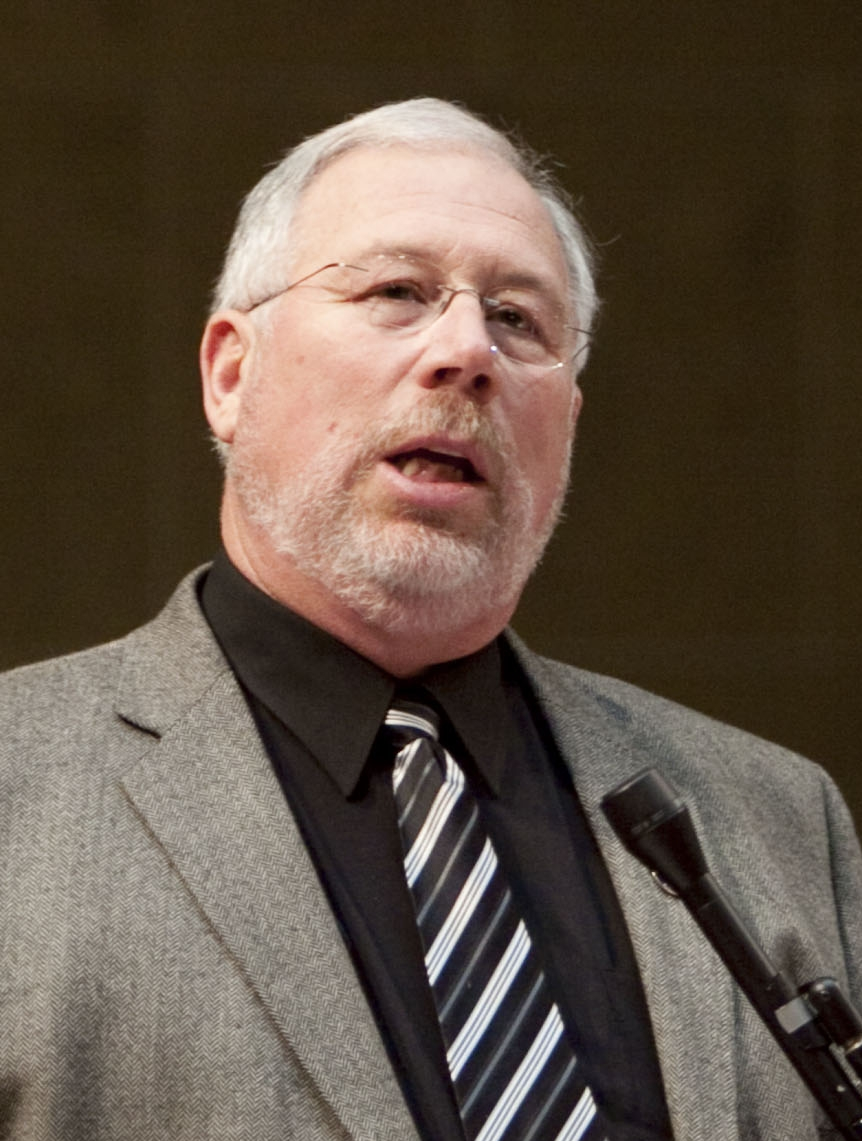
- Olsen in 2009

Member of the Wisconsin Senate from the 14th district
- In office January 3, 2005 – January 4, 2021
- Preceded by: Robert Welch
- Succeeded by: Joan Ballweg

Member of the Wisconsin State Assembly from the 41st district
- In office January 3, 1995 – January 3, 2005
- Preceded by: Robert Welch
- Succeeded by: Joan Ballweg

Personal details
- Born: February 26, 1951 (age 75) Berlin, Wisconsin, U.S.
- Party: Republican
- Spouse: Joan Wade
- Education: University of Wisconsin–Madison
- Profession: small business owner

Luther S. Olsen (born February 26, 1951) is an American politician and former member of the Wisconsin Legislature. A Republican, he served 16 years in the Wisconsin State Senate (2005–2021) and ten years in the Wisconsin State Assembly (1994–2005). Olsen was one of several Wisconsin state senators to survive the 2011 Wisconsin Senate recall elections.

== Early life, education, and early political career ==
Olsen was born on February 26, 1951, in Berlin, Wisconsin. In 1969, he graduated from Berlin High School. In 1973, he earned a B.S. from the University of Wisconsin–Madison. In 1976, he was elected to the Berlin School District Board, and was named President of the School Board in 1986. He left the board in 1997.

== Wisconsin Legislature ==
=== Elections ===
Before 2011

In Luther's political career prior to 2011, he had never faced a Democratic party opponent. In 1994, he was elected to the Wisconsin State Assembly. He won re-election in 1996, 1998, 2000, and 2002. In 2004, he was elected the Wisconsin Senate and re-election 2008.

His current Senate district is much more conservative than the state as a whole. In the 2008 presidential election, Democrat Barack Obama narrowly won with 52%, while he won statewide with 57%. In the 2010 Wisconsin gubernatorial election, Republican Scott Walker won with 57%, while he won statewide with 53%. In the 2011 Wisconsin judicial election, Republican David Prosser won the district with 55%, while winning statewide with just 50%.

2011 recall election

Olsen was the target of an active recall effort as part of the 2011 Wisconsin protests. On March 2, 2011, the "Committee to Recall Olsen" officially registered with the Wisconsin Government Accountability Board. On April 18, 2011, organizers filed petitions containing roughly 24,000 signatures to recall Olsen. If more than 14,733 of those signatures are found valid, a recall election will ensue. On April 21, 2011, State Representative Fred Clark (D - Baraboo) announced his candidacy against Olsen in a possible recall election. In late May 2011, the Wisconsin Government Accountability Board verified petitions against Olsen, overruling his challenges. The recall election was held on August 9, 2011. Olsen emphasized his pro-education record during his 17-year political career. He defended the $1 billion cut to public education in the 2011 budget as necessary "cuts that needed to be done." Olsen defeated State Rep. Fred Clark with 52% of the vote.

=== Tenure ===
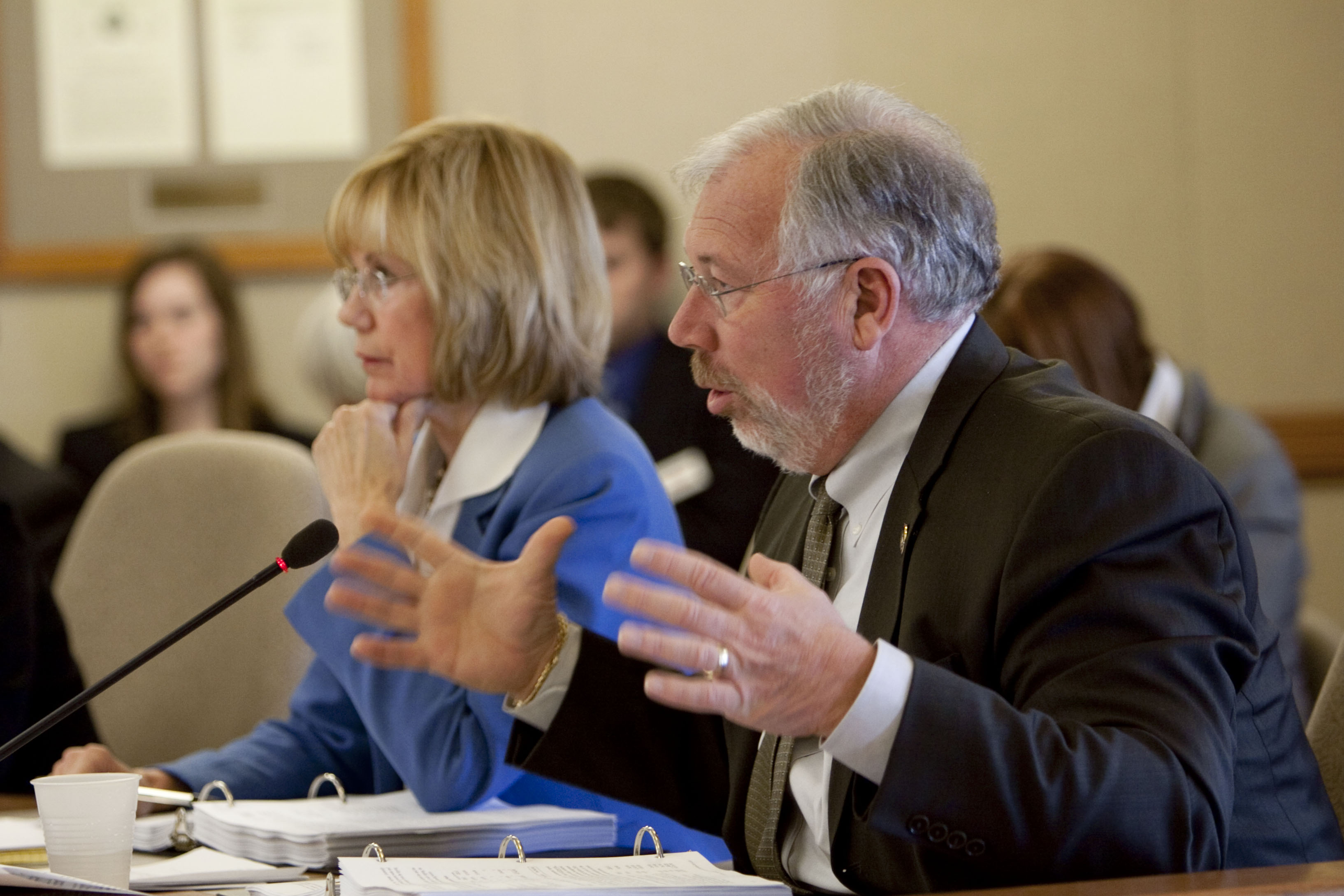
Olsen and Sen. Alberta Darling participating in a 2009 committee meeting

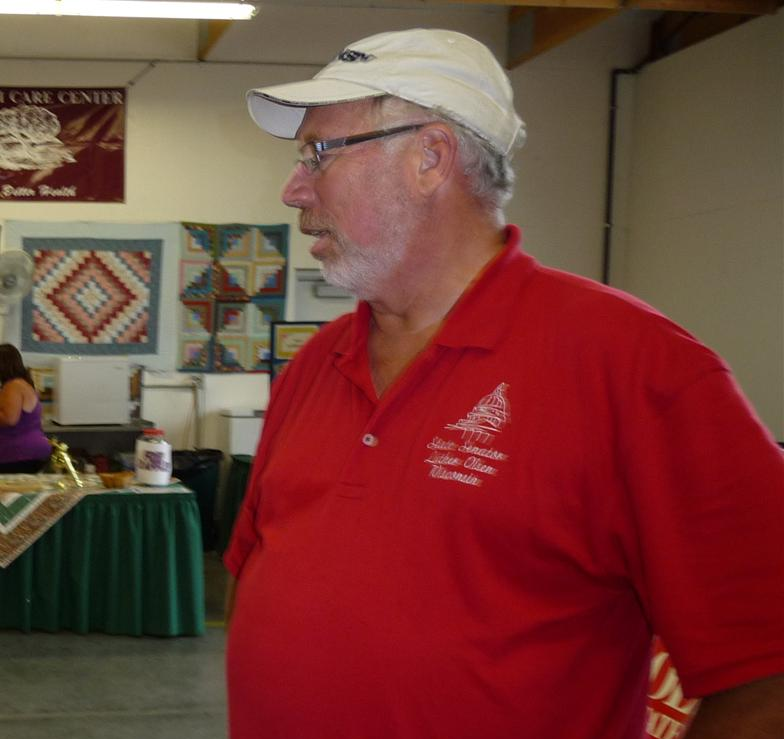
Olsen in 2011

During the 2011 Wisconsin protests regarding Governor Walker's budget repair bill, Olsen described the bill as "pretty radical" and mentioned that he had reservations regarding voting for collective bargaining repeal. Olsen ultimately voted for the bill.

In 2011, One Wisconsin Now filed an ethics complaint against Olsen with the Government Accountability Board. The complaint alleged that Olsen inserted language into a bill in order to financially help his wife. Olsen's wife, Joan Wade, responded to the complaint by calling it 'ridiculous.'

=== Committee assignments ===
Olsen was chairman of the Education Committee. He was also a member of the Finance, Insurance and Housing, and Finance committees.

== Electoral history ==
=== Wisconsin Assembly (1994–2002) ===
Year	Election	Date	Elected				Defeated				Total	Plurality
1994	Primary	Sep. 13	Luther S. Olsen	Republican	2,689	39.10%	Doug Lyke	Rep.	1,811	26.33%	6,878	878
1994	Primary	Sep. 13	Luther S. Olsen	Republican	2,689	39.10%	J. Derek Huseboe	Rep.	772	11.22%	6,878	878
1994	Primary	Sep. 13	Luther S. Olsen	Republican	2,689	39.10%	Lawrence D. Behlen	Rep.	693	10.08%	6,878	878
1994	Primary	Sep. 13	Luther S. Olsen	Republican	2,689	39.10%	Lonny Bigler	Rep.	472	6.86%	6,878	878
1994	Primary	Sep. 13	Luther S. Olsen	Republican	2,689	39.10%	Robert J. Wemmer	Rep.	441	6.41%	6,878	878
1994	General	Nov. 8	Luther S. Olsen	Republican	11,013	90.97%	Doug Lyke (write-in)	Rep.	1,093	9.03%	12,106	9,920
1996	General	Nov. 5	Luther S. Olsen (inc)	Republican	15,042	100.0%	--Unopposed--				15,042	N/A
1998	General	Nov. 3	Luther S. Olsen (inc)	Republican	13,475	99.89%	--Unopposed--				13,490	13,460
2000	General	Nov. 7	Luther S. Olsen (inc)	Republican	19,292	99.46%	--Unopposed--				19,396	19,188
2002	General	Nov. 5	Luther S. Olsen (inc)	Republican	13,497	99.53%	--Unopposed--				13,561	13,433

=== Wisconsin Senate (2004–2016) ===
Year	Election	Date	Elected				Defeated				Total	Plurality
2004	Primary	Sep. 14	Luther S. Olsen	Republican	10,224	57.24%	Roger D. Cross	Rep.	5,703	31.93%	17,863	4,521
2004	Primary	Sep. 14	Luther S. Olsen	Republican	10,224	57.24%	John C. Spillner Sr.	Rep.	1,613	9.03%	17,863	4,521
2004	General	Nov. 2	Luther S. Olsen	Republican	57,548	99.35%	--Unopposed--				57,926	57,170
2008	General	Nov. 4	Luther S. Olsen (inc)	Republican	54,138	99.36%	--Unopposed--				54,486	53,790
2011 (recall)	Recall	Aug. 9	Luther S. Olsen (inc)	Republican	26,553	52.10%	Fred Clark	Dem.	24,355	47.79%	50,964	2,198
2012	Primary	Aug. 14	Luther S. Olsen (inc)	Republican	14,782	77.26%	David Wayne Eiler	Rep.	4,341	22.69%	19,134	10,441
2012	General	Nov. 6	Luther S. Olsen (inc)	Republican	47,137	57.53%	Margarete Worthington	Dem.	34,742	42.40%	81,941	12,395
2016	General	Nov. 8	Luther S. Olsen (inc)	Republican	47,294	57.05%	Brian Smith	Dem.	35,555	42.89%	82,897	11,739

Wisconsin State Assembly
Preceded by Robert Welch	Member of the Wisconsin State Assembly from the 41st district 1994 – January 2005	Succeeded by Joan Ballweg
Wisconsin Senate
Preceded by Robert Welch	Member of the Wisconsin Senate from the 14th district January 2005 – January 4, 2021	Succeeded by Joan Ballweg
