= Dave Hansen (politician) =

American politician

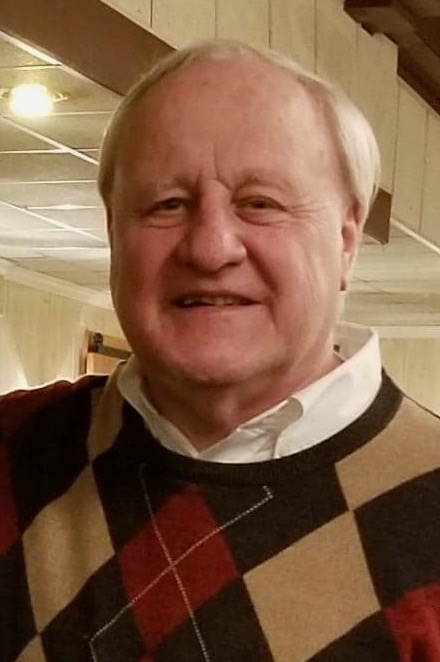
- Hansen in 2020

Majority Leader of the Wisconsin Senate
- In office December 15, 2010 – January 3, 2011
- Preceded by: Russ Decker
- Succeeded by: Scott Fitzgerald

Member of the Wisconsin Senate from the 30th district
- In office January 3, 2001 – January 4, 2021
- Preceded by: Gary Drzewiecki
- Succeeded by: Eric Wimberger

Personal details
- Born: December 18, 1947 (age 78) Green Bay, Wisconsin, U.S.
- Party: Democratic
- Spouse: Jane Dessart
- Children: 3
- Education: University of Wisconsin–Green Bay
- Website: Senate website

Dave Hansen (born December 18, 1947) is an American Democratic politician and former state legislator. He was a member of the Wisconsin State Senate from 2001 through 2021, representing the 30th senatorial district.

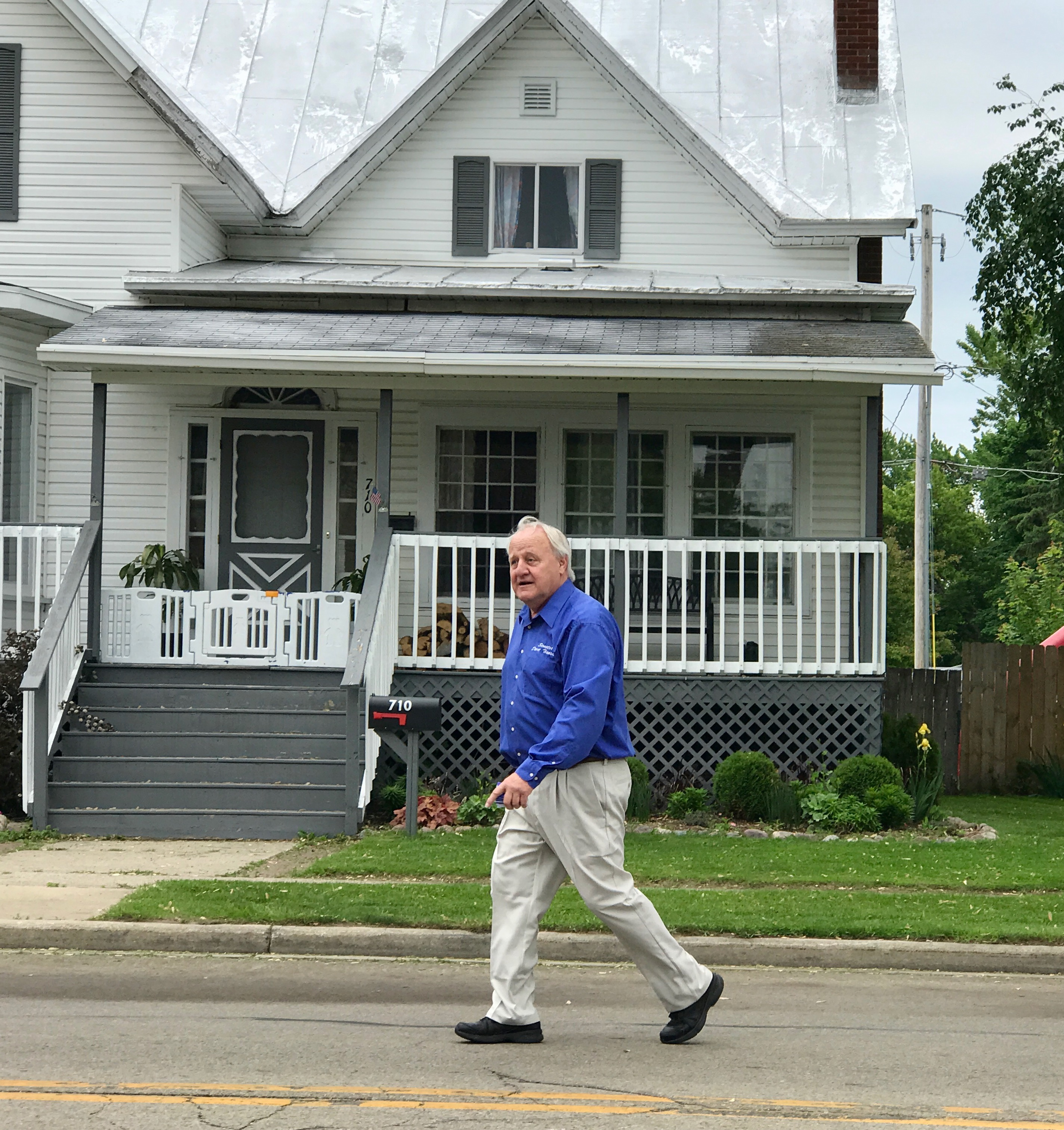
Hansen at Oconto 2018 Copperfest Parade

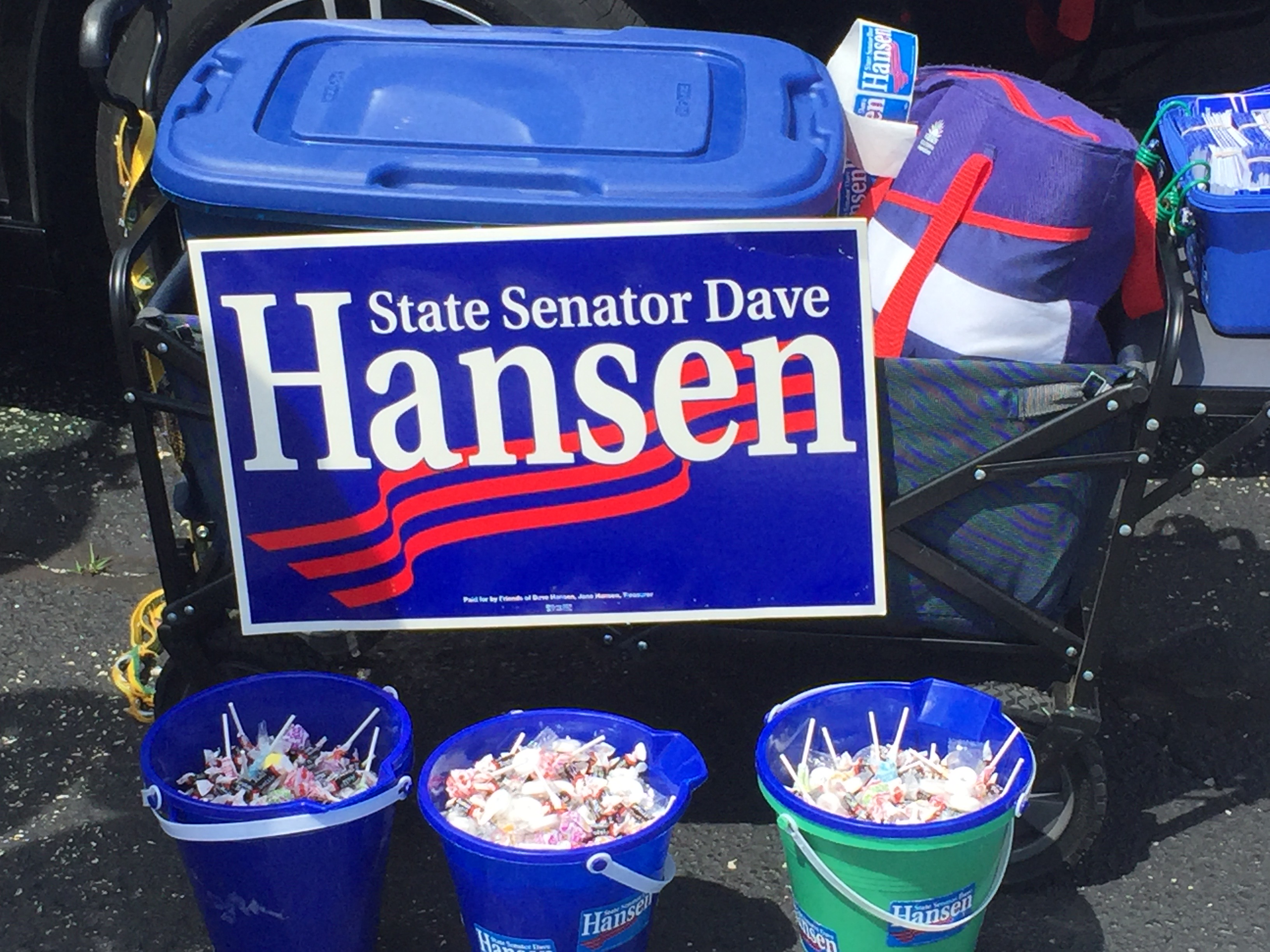
Hansen campaign logo

== Early life and education ==
Hansen was born in Green Bay, Wisconsin. He graduated from the University of Wisconsin–Green Bay in 1971, marrying Jane Dessart the same year; the couple has three children.

== Early career ==
Before being elected to public office, Hansen was a school teacher, a Teamster's Union steward, and also a truck driver for the City of Green Bay. He served on the Board of Supervisors for Brown County from 1996 to 2002.

== Wisconsin State Senate ==
Hansen was elected to the Wisconsin State Senate in November 2000. He defeated incumbent Republican Senator Gary Drzewiecki. He was re-elected in 2004, 2008, 2012, and 2016. He served as the Assistant Democratic Leader from 2003 until 2016.

=== 2011 Act 10 protests ===
On February 20, 2011, Hansen, along with the 13 other Democratic State Senators, fled the state to deny the State Senate a quorum on Governor Scott Walker's legislation, which, among other things, limited collective bargaining benefits for most municipal and state employees.

=== 2011 Recall effort ===
Hansen was the target of a recall effort as a result of his leaving the state in an attempt to prevent the Senate from being able to vote on Act 10. On July 19, however, he handily defeated his challenger and retained his seat.

A chronology of the recall effort:

- February 25: The committee "Recall Dave Hansen" officially registered with the Wisconsin Government Accountability Board. 13,582 signatures were required by April 26, 2011, to force a recall election. He was considered to be one of the three potentially vulnerable Democratic senators.
- April 21: Recall supporters filed about 18,872 signatures with Wisconsin's Government Accountability Board.
- June 10: Wisconsin's Government Accountability Board certified the recall election.
- July 19: Hansen defeated his recall challenger, Republican David VanderLeest, receiving 66% of the vote.

== Retirement ==
On January 9, 2020, Hansen announced he would retire after his term ended in January 2021. He cited the desire to spend more time with his wife, young grandchildren and older grandchildren as they start their careers. Hansen said he raised the possibility of retirement during a family get together over the Christmas holiday. He says his family was very supportive of the decision. Hansen said he was proud of bipartisan cooperation to pass legislation covering senior care and the Silver Alert system. But he also lamented the declining trend away from bipartisanship.

Senator Hansen's nephew, De Pere alderman Jonathon Hansen, ran in his uncle's senate district following his retirement.

Wisconsin Senate
Preceded by Gary Drzewiecki	Member of the Wisconsin Senate from the 30th district January 3, 2001 – January 4, 2021	Succeeded by Eric Wimberger
