= Charles Chvala =

American politician

Chuck Chvala
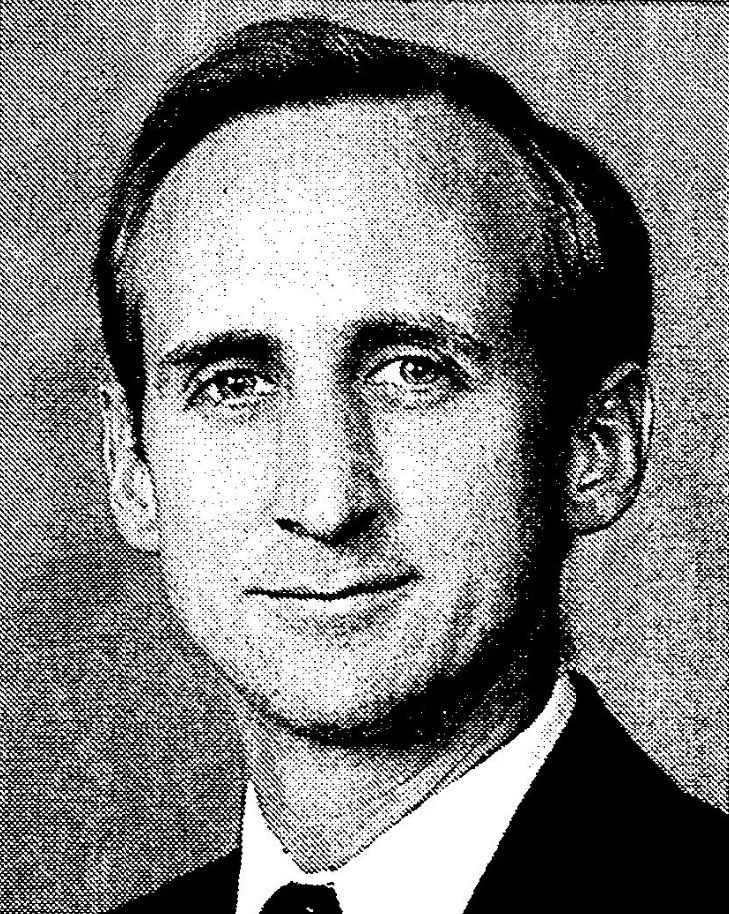

Majority Leader of the Wisconsin Senate
- In office January 4, 1999 – October 21, 2002
- Preceded by: Michael Ellis
- Succeeded by: Russ Decker (acting co-leader); Fred Risser (acting co-leader)
- In office June 14, 1996 – April 20, 1998
- Preceded by: Michael Ellis
- Succeeded by: Michael Ellis

Minority Leader of the Wisconsin Senate
- In office April 20, 1998 – January 4, 1999
- Preceded by: Michael Ellis
- Succeeded by: Michael Ellis
- In office October 17, 1995 – June 14, 1996
- Preceded by: Robert Jauch
- Succeeded by: Michael Ellis

Member of the Wisconsin Senate from the 16th district
- In office January 7, 1985 – January 3, 2005
- Preceded by: Carl W. Thompson
- Succeeded by: Mark F. Miller

Member of the Wisconsin State Assembly from the 98th district
- In office January 3, 1983 – January 7, 1985
- Preceded by: Edward Jackamonis
- Succeeded by: Peggy Rosenzweig

Personal details
- Born: December 5, 1954 (age 71) Merrill, Wisconsin, U.S.
- Party: Democratic
- Spouses: Tracyjean Rebenstorff (m. 1978; div. 1988); Barbara Worcester (m. 1991)
- Children: 2
- Education: University of Wisconsin, Madison (BA, JD)

Charles Joseph "Chuck" Chvala (born December 5, 1954) is an American real estate dealer, lawyer, and former politician. He served 20 years in the Wisconsin State Senate, representing Dane County, and was the Democratic caucus leader from 1995 through 2002. His political career was ended by a 2002 scandal which found he and other lawmakers had illegally utilized state employees for campaign work.

== Early life and career ==
Born in Merrill, Wisconsin, Chvala's family moved to Madison where he attended La Follette High School, and served as a student member of the Madison School Board. He earned his bachelor's degree in political science from the University of Wisconsin–Madison in 1978 and the same year earned his J.D. from the University of Wisconsin Law School.

Both of Chvala's parents were teachers in the Madison School District, and famously led a strike in the 1970s. His parents' involvement with the teachers' union was a springboard for his entrance into politics. He made his first run for Wisconsin State Assembly in 1978, relying on union support in the Democratic primary. He ultimately fell 174 votes short of David Travis, another first time candidate who would also go on to become a Democratic caucus leader in the 1990s.

Between 1978 and 1982, Chvala worked as a lawyer and legislative consultant in Madison. His clients included the Wisconsin Pharmaceutical Association and the Citizens Utility Board. He also served the boards of the non-profit organizations Vets House and The Attic.

== Political career ==
=== Legislative career ===
Following the court-ordered redistricting of 1982, Chvala ran in the newly drawn 98th Assembly district. Due to the drastic redistricting, there was no incumbent in the district. Chvala prevailed over a field of five Democrats in the primary, and went on to receive 70% of the vote in the general election.

In 1983, the Legislature passed another redistricting plan, superseding the court-ordered plan. Chvala chose to run for Wisconsin State Senate in 1984, in the redrawn 16th Senate district, which now stretched from Madison's east side through eastern Dane County, western Rock County, and across Green County. This time, Chvala faced no opposition in the Democratic primary, but had a more competitive general election, receiving 54% of the vote over Republican Thomas L. Storm. He was subsequently re-elected four times, serving until 2005.

=== Gubernatorial campaign ===
In 1994, Chvala sought to challenge incumbent Republican Governor Tommy Thompson. Chvala faced no opposition in the Democratic primary, but lost to Thompson in a landslide, receiving only 31% of the statewide vote.

=== Senate leadership ===
From 1995 to 2002 he led Senate Democrats during a time of razor-thin, one-vote party balances, leading to flips between Democratic and Republican leadership control in the event of legislative vacancies or intra-term seats changing hands due to special elections. Control of the legislature flipped four times during Chvala's tenure as Democratic caucus leader, twice due to intra-term special elections, and twice due to general election victories.

In the fall of 2002, Chvala and other legislative leaders were caught in a scandal arising from the use of state legislative staffers and resources for political campaign duties. He was charged with 20 felony counts, including extortion, misconduct in public office, and filing false election reports. He pleaded guilty to two counts, and was sentenced to nine months in jail with two years of probation.

=== After the legislature ===
While on probation, Chvala became involved in the real estate market in collaboration with his daughter, who was a licensed broker. His law license, which had been suspended following his guilty plea, was reinstated in 2008, enabling him to resume his legal practice. He also serves as a regular contributor to The Insiders, a political commentary series in Wisconsin.

== Personal life and family ==
Chvala married Tracyjean Rebenstorff in June 1978. They had two children together before divorcing in 1988.

Chvala subsequently married Barbara Worcester, a Senate legislative staffer, in 1991. Worcester continued her career in government after Chvala's resignation and served for many years as chief of staff to Democratic Senate leader Russ Decker. She now works as deputy chief of staff to Governor Tony Evers.

== Electoral history ==
=== Wisconsin Assembly (1978, 1982) ===
Wisconsin Assembly, 37th District Election, 1978
Party	Candidate	Votes	%	±%
Democratic Primary, September 12, 1978
Democratic	David M. Travis	2,043	31.61%	
Democratic	Charles J. Chvala	1,869	28.92%	
Democratic	Harold F. Klubertanz	1,624	25.13%	
Democratic	S. Michael Shivers	564	8.73%	
Democratic	Jeanne M. Tabbutt	363	5.61%	
Total votes		6,463	100%	

Wisconsin Assembly, 98th District Election, 1982
Party	Candidate	Votes	%	±%
Democratic Primary, September 14, 1982
Democratic	Charles J. Chvala	3,579	42.93%	
Democratic	Norman A. Cummings	1,497	17.96%	
Democratic	Rita Wlodarczyk	1,367	16.4%	
Democratic	Jane Hoepker	1,181	14.17%	
Democratic	Judson Knoll	712	8.54%	
Total votes		8336	100%	
General Election, November 3, 1982
Democratic	Charles J. Chvala	11,338	69.9%	
Republican	Robert T. Stanek	4,881	30.09%	
Total votes		16,219	100%	

=== Wisconsin Senate (1984–2000) ===
Year	Election	Date	Elected				Defeated				Total	Plurality
1984	General	Nov. 6	Charles Chvala	Democratic	34,296	54.03%	Thomas L. Storm	Rep.	29,177	45.97%	63,473	5,119
1988	General	Nov. 8	Charles Chvala (inc.)	Democratic	40,586	62.47%	J. Michael Blaca	Rep.	24,379	37.53%	64,965	16,207
1992	General	Nov. 3	Charles Chvala (inc.)	Democratic	46,888	63.63%	Eric D. Gordon	Rep.	26,799	36.37%	73,687	20,089
1996	General	Nov. 5	Charles Chvala (inc.)	Democratic	39,618	53.67%	Tom Metcalfe	Rep.	32,997	44.70%	73,819	6,621
1996	General	Nov. 5	Charles Chvala (inc.)	Democratic	39,618	53.67%	Mike A. Oprish	Lib.	1,204	1.63%	73,819	6,621
2000	General	Nov. 7	Charles Chvala (inc.)	Democratic	51,076	57.93%	Lisa B. Nelson	Rep.	37,037	42.01%	88,168	14,039

=== Wisconsin Governor (1994) ===
Wisconsin Gubernatorial Election, 1994
Party	Candidate	Votes	%	±%
General Election, November 8, 1994
Republican	Tommy Thompson (incumbent) & Scott McCallum (incumbent)	1,051,326	67.26%	+9.08%
Democratic	Charles Chvala & Dorothy K. Dean	482,850	30.89%	−10.89%
Libertarian	David S. Harmon & Kevin J. Robinson	11,639	0.74%	
Constitution	Edward J. Frami & Michael J. O'Hare	9,188	0.59%	
Independent	Michael J. Mangan	8,150	0.52%	
	Scattering	682	0.04%	
Plurality		568,476	36.35%	+19.97%
Total votes		1,563,153	100.0%	+13.34%
Republican hold				

Party political offices
Preceded by Thomas A. Loftus	Democratic nominee for Governor of Wisconsin; 1994	Succeeded by Ed Garvey
Wisconsin Senate
Preceded by Robert Jauch	Minority Leader of the Wisconsin Senate; 1995–1996	Succeeded by Michael Ellis
Preceded by Michael Ellis	Majority Leader of the Wisconsin Senate; 1996–1998	Succeeded by Michael Ellis
Preceded by Michael Ellis	Minority Leader of the Wisconsin Senate; 1998–1999	Succeeded by Michael Ellis
Preceded by Michael Ellis	Majority Leader of the Wisconsin Senate; 1999–2002	Succeeded by Russ Decker; Fred Risser as Acting Co-Majority Leaders of the Wisconsin Senate
