= Roger Breske =

American politician (1938-2012)

Wisconsin Commissioner of Railroads
- In office May 28, 2008 – March 1, 2011
- Appointed by: Jim Doyle
- Preceded by: Rodney W. Kreunen
- Succeeded by: Jeffrey Plale

Member of the Wisconsin Senate from the 12th district
- In office November 28, 1990 – June 4, 2008
- Preceded by: Lloyd H. Kincaid
- Succeeded by: Jim Holperin

Personal details
- Born: November 8, 1938 Elderon, Wisconsin, U.S.
- Died: April 3, 2012 (aged 73) Weston, Wisconsin, U.S.
- Resting place: Saint Philomenes Cemetery, Norrie, Wisconsin
- Party: Democratic
- Spouse: Karen Woznicki (m. 1959–2012)
- Children: 4
- Occupation: Tavern owner

Military service
- Allegiance: United States
- Branch/service: United States Army Reserve

Roger M. Breske (November 8, 1938 – April 3, 2012) was an American businessman and Democratic politician from Shawano County, Wisconsin. He was a member of the Wisconsin Senate from 1990 through 2008, representing the 12th district. He then served two years as Wisconsin Railroad Commissioner.

== Biography ==
Roger Breske was born November 8, 1938, in Elderon, Wisconsin, in eastern Marathon County. As a child, he attended school in the neighboring community of Wittenberg, Wisconsin, in Shawano County, and graduated from Wittenberg High School. As a young man, he served in the United States Army Reserve. He became the owner of a tavern and restaurant known as "Breske's Bar", which he operated for more than 20 years.

Through his tavern business, he became active in the Tavern League of Wisconsin, one of the most powerful business lobbies in the state. He first became president of the Marathon County Tavern League, and was then elected president of the state organization in 1985.

In 1990, Wisconsin state senator Lloyd H. Kincaid announced he would retire due to poor health before the end of his term, necessitating a special election that fall. Breske entered the race for the Democratic Party nomination, and prevailed in the crowded five-person primary, receiving 39% of the vote. Breske went on to win a close victory over his Republican opponent in the special election, which coincided with the November 6, 1990, general election.

Breske went on to win re-election in 1992, 1996, 2000, and 2004. He was considered a more conservative member of the Democratic caucus, and sometimes frustrated his party leadership. Most notoriously, in 2008 Breske managed to derail a statewide smoking ban which had been a signature issue pushed by Democratic governor Jim Doyle. The following Spring, Doyle appointed Breske to serve as Wisconsin Railroad Commissioner. Breske accepted the appointment and resigned from the Senate in June 2008.

Breske served until the end of his term, which ended on March 1, 2011, and did not seek re-appointment from the new Republican governor Scott Walker.

Breske died less than a year later, suffering a heart attack in his home on April 3, 2012.

== Personal life and family ==
Roger Breske married Karen Woznicki at St. Florian Catholic Church, in Hatley, Wisconsin, on April 25, 1959. They had four children together and were married for 53 years.

== Electoral history ==
=== Wisconsin Senate (1990–2004) ===
Year	Election	Date	Elected				Defeated				Total	Plurality
1990	Primary	Sep. 11	Roger Breske	Democratic	4,906	39.20%	Jolene Plautz	Dem.	4,309	34.43%	12,515	597
1990	Primary	Sep. 11	Roger Breske	Democratic	4,906	39.20%	Bonnie Stowers	Dem.	1,742	13.92%	12,515	597
1990	Primary	Sep. 11	Roger Breske	Democratic	4,906	39.20%	James V. Mabry	Dem.	1,010	8.07%	12,515	597
1990	Primary	Sep. 11	Roger Breske	Democratic	4,906	39.20%	Joseph Pasowicz	Dem.	548	4.38%	12,515	597
1990	Special	Nov. 6	Roger Breske	Democratic	24,350	50.93%	Gordon R. Connor	Rep.	23,462	49.07%	47,812	888
1992	Primary	Sep. 8	Roger Breske (inc)	Democratic	11,601	70.67%	Lloyd H. Kincaid	Dem.	4,815	29.33%	16,416	6,786
1992	General	Nov. 3	Roger Breske (inc)	Democratic	39,282	52.34%	Robert G. Ourada	Rep.	35,765	47.66%	75,047	3,517
1996	General	Nov. 5	Roger Breske (inc)	Democratic	40,220	57.41%	Nancy Levanetz	Rep.	29,838	42.59%	70,058	10,382
2000	General	Nov. 7	Roger Breske (inc)	Democratic	55,692	88.34%	John E. Bailey	Lib.	7,278	11.54%	63,045	48,414
2004	General	Nov. 2	Roger Breske (inc)	Democratic	47,287	53.47%	Tom Tiffany	Rep.	41,119	46.49%	88,444	6,168

Wisconsin Senate
Preceded by Lloyd H. Kincaid	Member of the Wisconsin Senate from the 12th district November 28, 1990 – June 4, 2008	Succeeded by Jim Holperin
Government offices
Preceded by Rodney W. Kreunen	Wisconsin Commissioner of Railroads; May 28, 2008 – March 2011	Succeeded by Jeffrey Plale
