= Carol Roessler =

American politician (born 1948)

Carol A. Roessler

Member of the Wisconsin Senate from the 18th district
- In office April 21, 1987 – July 4, 2008
- Preceded by: Scott McCallum
- Succeeded by: Randy Hopper

Member of the Wisconsin State Assembly
- In office January 7, 1985 – April 21, 1987
- Preceded by: Cathy Zeuske
- Succeeded by: Gregg Underheim
- Constituency: 54th district
- In office January 3, 1983 – January 7, 1985
- Preceded by: Randall J. Radtke
- Succeeded by: David Travis
- Constituency: 81st district

Personal details
- Born: January 16, 1948 (age 78) Madison, Wisconsin, U.S.
- Party: Republican
- Spouses: Douglas W. Buettner (div. 1993); Paul Roessler (m. 1997)

Carol A. Roessler (born January 16, 1948) is an American politician and public administrator. She served as a Republican in the Wisconsin State Senate (1987–2008) and State Assembly (1983–1987). She left the State Senate in 2008 to join the administration of Democratic Governor Jim Doyle as Administrator of State and Local Finance in the Wisconsin Department of Revenue. Until 1997, she was known as Carol A. Buettner.

== Biography ==
Born in Madison, Wisconsin, she graduated from Madison West High School and went on to earn her bachelor's degree from University of Wisconsin–Oshkosh.

She was elected as a Republican to the Wisconsin State Assembly in 1982, and was subsequently elected to the Wisconsin State Senate in an April 1987 special election.

Roessler later joined the faculty of Fox Valley Technical College.

== Personal life and family ==
Rossler married Douglas W. Buettner, an Oshkosh, Wisconsin rental property owner, and took his last name. They divorced in 1993 and, in 1997, she married Paul Roessler and took his name.
