= Gary Drzewiecki =

American businessman and politician

Gary Drzewiecki (born October 29, 1954) is an American businessman, tree farmer and former politician.

Born in Pulaski, Wisconsin, Drzewiecki went to University of Wisconsin–Stout. Drzewiecki is an investment counselor and tree farmer. He served on the Pulaski Board of Trustees and was the Pulaski village president.

He served in the Wisconsin State Senate as a Republican from 1993 to 2001. In November 2000, Drzewiecki was defeated in the general election. In 2006, Drewiecki ran for the Wisconsin State Assembly Republican primary election and narrowly lost the election to John Nygren.
