= 100th Wisconsin Legislature =

Wisconsin legislative term for 2011–12

←	99th	101st	→
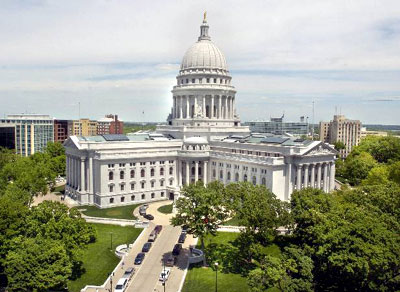
- Wisconsin State Capitol

Overview
- Legislative body: Wisconsin Legislature
- Meeting place: Wisconsin State Capitol
- Term: January 3, 2011 – January 7, 2013
- Election: November 2, 2010

Senate
- Members: 33
- Senate President: Michael G. Ellis (R); ^{until July 17, 2012}; Fred Risser (D); ^{from July 17, 2012}
- President pro tempore: Joseph K. Leibham (R); ^{until July 17, 2012}; Tim Carpenter (D); ^{from July 17, 2012}
- Party control: Republican; ^{until July 17, 2012}; Democratic; ^{from July 17, 2012}

Assembly
- Members: 99
- Assembly Speaker: Jeff Fitzgerald (R)
- Speaker pro tempore: Bill Kramer (R)
- Party control: Republican

Sessions
- Regular: January 3, 2011 – January 7, 2013

Special sessions
- Jan. 2011 Spec.: January 4, 2011 – September 27, 2011
- Jun. 2011 Extra.: June 14, 2011 – August 1, 2011
- Sep. 2011 Spec.: September 29, 2011 – December 8, 2011

The One-Hundredth Wisconsin Legislature convened from January 3, 2011, through January 7, 2013, in regular session, though it adjourned for legislative activity on May 22, 2012. The legislature also held two special sessions and an extraordinary session during this legislative term.

This session was the start of eight years of unified Republican control of the governor's office and both chambers of the legislature. In this session, new governor Scott Walker pushed through the controversial 2011 Wisconsin Act 10, referred to at the time as the "Budget Repair Bill". The most controversial provision of the law was the stripping of state employees of collective bargaining rights. During consideration of the bill, mass protests erupted at the state capitol, and Democratic state senators fled the state in order to deny the Senate a quorum needed for budgetary legislation. Republicans in the state senate were eventually able to circumvent the quorum issue by stripping out all budgetary items from the bill and passing it as ordinary legislation. The session also saw passage of 2011 Wisconsin Act 43, the dramatic gerrymander which successfully locked in Republican control of the legislature for the next decade.

Following the outrage over Act 10, recall elections were held in 2011 and 2012 in which 13 state senators were challenged. Three were eventually removed from office and replaced by Democrats—one other resigned, but was replaced by a senator of the same party. The result was that Democrats briefly regained the senate majority in the second half of 2012. The governor was also subject to a recall election in 2012, but survived with roughly the same election margin as he had won in the 2010 election.

Senators representing odd-numbered districts were newly elected for this session and were serving the first two years of a four-year term. Assembly members were elected to a two-year term. Assembly members and odd-numbered senators were elected in the general election of November 2, 2010. Senators representing even-numbered districts were serving the third and fourth year of their four-year term, having been elected in the general election held on November 4, 2008.

The governor of Wisconsin during this entire term was Republican Scott Walker, of Milwaukee County, serving the first two years of a four-year term, having won election in the 2010 Wisconsin gubernatorial election.

== Major events ==
- January 3, 2011: Inauguration of Scott Walker as the 45th Governor of Wisconsin.
- February 14, 2011: Major protests began at the Wisconsin State Capitol over the proposed "Budget Repair" Bill.
- February 17, 2011: 14 Democratic senators fled the state to deny the senate a quorum and prevent passage of the Budget Repair Bill.
- March 9, 2011: Senate Republicans amended the Budget Repair Bill to remove budgetary items, allowing it to pass without a quorum.
- July 19, 2011: Senator Dave Hansen survived a recall election.
- August 9, 2011: 2011 Wisconsin recall elections:
  - Senators Randy Hopper and Dan Kapanke were defeated in recall elections, they were replaced by Jessica King and Jennifer Shilling, respectively.
  - Senators Robert Cowles, Alberta Darling, Sheila Harsdorf, and Luther Olsen survived recall elections.
- August 16, 2011: Senators Jim Holperin and Robert Wirch survived recall elections.
- March 16, 2012: Pam Galloway resigned from the Wisconsin Senate.
- June 5, 2012: 2012 Wisconsin recall elections:
  - Governor Scott Walker survived a recall election.
  - Senator Van H. Wanggaard was defeated in a recall election and was replaced by John Lehman.
  - Senators Scott L. Fitzgerald and Terry Moulton survived recall elections.
  - Jerry Petrowski was elected to the Senate in a special election.

== Major legislation ==
- March 11, 2011: Act relating to state finances, collective bargaining for public employees, compensation and fringe benefits of public employees, the state civil service system, the Medical Assistance program, 2011 Act 10. The controversial Budget Repair Bill which removed collective bargaining rights from state employees, prompted months of protests at the state capitol, and ultimately led to recall elections for thirteen senators and Governor Scott Walker.
- August 9, 2011: Act relating to legislative redistricting, 2011 Act 43. An overhaul of Wisconsin legislative voting districts fortified the Republican majorities through gerrymandering.

== Party summary ==
=== Senate summary ===
Senate Partisan composition Democratic: 14 seats Republican: 19 seats

	Party (Shading indicates majority caucus)		Total	
	Democratic	Republican	Total	Vacant
End of previous Legislature	18	15	33	0
Start of Reg. Session	14	19	33	0
From Aug. 8, 2011 (Note: Republicans Randy Hopper (18th district) and Dan Kapanke (32nd district) were recalled from office.)	14	17	31	2
From Aug. 25, 2011 (Note: Democrats Jessica King (18th district) and Jennifer Shilling (32nd district) were sworn in to replace Randy Hopper and Dan Kapanke, respectively.)	16	17	33	0
From Mar. 17, 2012 (Note: Republican Pam Galloway (29th district) resigned.)	16	16	32	1
From Jul. 11, 2012 (Note: Republican Van H. Wanggaard (21st district) was recalled from office.)	16	15	31	2
From Jul. 17, 2012 (Note: Democrat John Lehman (21st district) and Republican Jerry Petrowski (29th district) were sworn in to replace Van H. Wanggaard and Pam Galloway, respectively.)	17	16	33	0
From Aug. 5, 2012 (Note: Republican Rich Zipperer (33rd district) resigned.)	17	15	32	1
From Dec. 14, 2012 (Note: Republican Paul Farrow (33rd district) was sworn in to succeed Rich Zipperer.)	17	16	33	0
Final voting share	51.52%	48.48%		
Beginning of the next Legislature	15	18	33	0

=== Assembly summary ===
Assembly Partisan composition Democratic: 39 seats Independent: 1 seat Republican: 59 seats

	Party (Shading indicates majority caucus)			Total	
	Dem.	Ind.	Rep.	Total	Vacant
End of previous Legislature	49	2	45	96	3
Start of Reg. Session (Note: Republicans Mark Gottlieb (60th district), Scott Gunderson (83rd district), and Michael Huebsch (94th district) resigned before the start of the term to accept appointments in Governor Scott Walker's administration.)	38	1	57	96	3
From Apr. 14, 2011 (Note: Democrat Joe Parisi (48th district) resigned after being elected county executive.)	37	1	57	95	4
From May 3, 2011 (Note: Republicans Duey Stroebel (60th district) and David Craig (83rd district) and Democrat Steve Doyle (94th district) were sworn in to replace Mark Gottlieb, Scott Gunderson, and Michael Huebsch, respectively.)	38	1	59	98	1
From Aug. 9, 2011 (Note: Democrat Jennifer Shilling (95th district) resigned after her election to the state senate. Democrat Chris Taylor (48th district) was sworn in to replace Joe Parisi.)	38	1	59	98	1
From Nov. 8, 2011 (Note: Democrat Jill Billings (95th district) was sworn in to replace Jennifer Shilling.)	39	1	59	99	0
From Jun. 5, 2012 (Note: Republican Jerry Petrowski (86th district) resigned after his election to the state senate.)	39	1	58	98	1
From Jul. 2, 2012 (Note: Democrat Barbara Toles (17th district) resigned.)	38	1	58	97	2
From Dec. 14, 2012 (Note: Republican Paul Farrow (98th district) resigned after his election to the state senate.)	38	1	57	96	3
Final voting share	39.58%	59.38%			
Beginning of the next Legislature	39	0	59	98	1

== Sessions ==
- Regular session: January 3, 2011 – January 7, 2013
- January 2011 special session: January 4, 2011 – September 27, 2011
- June 2011 extraordinary session: June 14, 2011 – August 1, 2011
- September 2011 special session: September 29, 2011 – December 8, 2011

== Leadership ==
=== Senate leadership ===
- President of the Senate: Michael G. Ellis (R–Neenah) (until Jul. 17, 2012)
  - Fred Risser (D–Madison) (after Jul. 17, 2012)
- President pro tempore: Joe Leibham (R–Sheboygan) (until Jul. 17, 2012)
  - Tim Carpenter (D–Milwaukee) (after Jul. 17, 2012)

Senate majority leadership

- Senate Majority Leader: Scott L. Fitzgerald (R–Juneau) (until Jul. 17, 2012)
  - Mark Miller (D–Monona) (after Jul. 17, 2012)
- Assistant Majority Leader: Glenn Grothman (R–West Bend) (until Jul. 17, 2012)
  - Dave Hansen (D–Green Bay) (after Jul. 17, 2012)
- Majority Caucus Chair: Dan Kapanke (R–La Crosse) (until Aug. 8, 2011)
  - Pam Galloway (R–Wausau) (from Aug. 2011 until Mar. 16, 2012)
  - Julie Lassa (D–Stevens Point) (after Jul. 17, 2012)
- Majority Caucus Vice Chair: Sheila Harsdorf (R–River Falls) (until Jul. 17, 2012)
  - Kathleen Vinehout (D–Alma) (after Jul. 17, 2012)

Senate minority leadership

- Senate Minority Leader: Mark Miller (D–Monona) (until Jul. 17, 2012)
  - Scott L. Fitzgerald (R–Juneau) (after Jul. 17, 2012)
- Assistant Minority Leader: Dave Hansen (D–Green Bay) (until Jul. 17, 2012)
  - Glenn Grothman (R–West Bend) (after Jul. 17, 2012)
- Minority Caucus Chair: Julie Lassa (D–Stevens Point) (until Jul. 17, 2012)
  - Neal Kedzie (R–Elkhorn) (after Jul. 17, 2012)
- Minority Caucus Vice Chair: Kathleen Vinehout (D–Alma) (until Jul. 17, 2012)
  - Sheila Harsdorf (R–River Falls) (after Jul. 17, 2012)

=== Assembly leadership ===
- Speaker of the Assembly: Jeff Fitzgerald (R–Horicon)
- Speaker pro tempore: Bill Kramer (R–Waukesha)

Assembly majority leadership (Republican)

- Assembly Majority Leader: Scott Suder (R–Abbotsford)
- Assistant Majority Leader: Dan Knodl (R–Germantown)
- Assembly Majority Caucus Chair: Joan Ballweg (R–Markesan)
- Assembly Majority Caucus Vice Chair: John Murtha (R–Baldwin)
- Assembly Majority Caucus Secretary: Mary Williams (R–Medford)
- Assembly Majority Caucus Sergeant-at-Arms: Samantha Kerkman (R–Randall)

Assembly minority leadership (Democratic)

- Assembly Minority Leader: Peter Barca (D–Kenosha)
- Assistant Minority Leader: Donna Seidel (D–Wausau)
- Assembly Minority Caucus Chair: Kelda Roys (D–Madison)
- Assembly Minority Caucus Vice Chair: Fred Clark (D–Baraboo)
- Assembly Minority Caucus Secretary: Penny Bernard Schaber (D–Appleton)
- Assembly Minority Caucus Sergeant-at-Arms: Josh Zepnick (D–Milwaukee)

== Members ==
=== Members of the Senate ===
Members of the Senate for the One-Hundredth Wisconsin Legislature:

Senate partisan representation Democratic: 14 seats Republican: 19 seats

Dist.	Senator	Party	Age (2011)	Home	First elected
01	Frank Lasee	Rep.	49	De Pere, Brown County	2010
02	Robert Cowles	Rep.	60	Green Bay, Brown County	1987
03	Tim Carpenter	Dem.	50	Milwaukee, Milwaukee County	2002
04	Lena Taylor	Dem.	44	Milwaukee, Milwaukee County	2004
05	Leah Vukmir	Rep.	52	Wauwatosa, Milwaukee County	2010
06	Spencer Coggs	Dem.	61	Milwaukee, Milwaukee County	2003
07	Chris Larson	Dem.	30	Milwaukee, Milwaukee County	2010
08	Alberta Darling	Rep.	66	River Hills, Milwaukee County	1992
09	Joe Leibham	Rep.	41	Sheboygan, Sheboygan County	2002
10	Sheila Harsdorf	Rep.	54	River Falls, Pierce County	2000
11	Neal Kedzie	Rep.	54	Elkhorn, Walworth County	2002
12	Jim Holperin	Dem.	60	Conover, Vilas County	2008
13	Scott L. Fitzgerald	Rep.	47	Juneau, Dodge County	1994
14	Luther Olsen	Rep.	59	Ripon, Fond du Lac County	2004
15	Timothy Cullen	Dem.	66	Janesville, Rock County	2010
16	Mark F. Miller	Dem.	67	Monona, Dane County	2004
17	Dale Schultz	Rep.	57	Richland Center, Richland County	1991
18	Randy Hopper (rec. Aug. 8, 2011)	Rep.	44	Fond du Lac, Fond du Lac County	2008
18	Jessica King (from Aug. 25, 2011)	Dem.	36	Oshkosh, Winnebago County	2011†
19	Michael Ellis	Rep.	69	Neenah, Winnebago County	1982
20	Glenn Grothman	Rep.	55	West Bend, Washington County	2004
21	Van H. Wanggaard (rec. Jul. 11, 2012)	Rep.	58	Racine, Racine County	2010
21	John Lehman (from Jul. 16, 2012)	Dem.	66	Racine, Racine County	2012†
22	Robert Wirch	Dem.	67	Pleasant Prairie, Kenosha County	1996
23	Terry Moulton	Rep.	64	Chippewa Falls, Chippewa County	2010
24	Julie Lassa	Dem.	40	Stevens Point, Portage County	2003
25	Robert Jauch	Dem.	65	Poplar, Douglas County	1986
26	Fred Risser	Dem.	83	Madison, Dane County	1962
27	Jon Erpenbach	Dem.	49	Waunakee, Dane County	1998
28	Mary Lazich	Rep.	58	New Berlin, Waukesha County	1998
29	Pam Galloway (res. Mar. 16, 2012)	Rep.	55	Wausau, Marathon County	2010
29	Jerry Petrowski (from July 17, 2012)	Rep.	62	Marathon, Marathon County	2012
30	Dave Hansen	Dem.	63	Green Bay, Brown County	2000
31	Kathleen Vinehout	Dem.	52	Alma, Buffalo County	2006
32	Dan Kapanke (rec. Aug. 8, 2011)	Rep.	63	La Crosse, La Crosse County	2004
32	Jennifer Shilling (from Aug. 25, 2011)	Dem.	42	La Crosse, La Crosse County	2011†
33	Rich Zipperer (res. Aug. 5, 2012)	Rep.	36	Pewaukee, Waukesha County	2010
33	--Vacant from Aug. 5, 2012--				

† Elected in a recall election (2011, 2012)

=== Members of the Assembly ===
Members of the Assembly for the One-Hundredth Wisconsin Legislature:

Assembly partisan representation Democratic: 39 seats Independent: 1 seat Republican: 59 seats

Senate District	Assembly District	Representative	Party	Age (2011)	Home	First Elected
01	01	Garey Bies	Rep.	64	Sister Bay	2000
01	02	Andre Jacque	Rep.	30	Bellevue	2010
01	03	Alvin Ott	Rep.	61	Forest Junction	1986
02	04	Chad Weininger	Rep.	38	Green Bay	2010
02	05	Jim Steineke	Rep.	40	Kaukauna	2010
02	06	Gary Tauchen	Rep.	57	Bonduel	2006
03	07	Peggy Krusick	Dem.	54	Milwaukee	1983
03	08	Jocasta Zamarripa	Dem.	34	Milwaukee	2010
03	09	Josh Zepnick	Dem.	42	Milwaukee	2002
04	10	Elizabeth M. Coggs	Dem.	54	Milwaukee	2010
04	11	Jason Fields	Dem.	36	Milwaukee	2004
04	12	Frederick P. Kessler	Dem.	70	Milwaukee	2004
05	13	David Cullen	Dem.	50	Milwaukee	1990
05	14	Dale P. Kooyenga	Rep.	31	Brookfield	2010
05	15	Tony Staskunas	Dem.	49	West Allis	1996
06	16	Leon Young	Dem.	43	Milwaukee	1992
06	17	Barbara Toles (res. Jul. 2, 2012)	Dem.	54	Milwaukee	2004
06	17	--Vacant from Jul. 2, 2012--				
06	18	Tamara Grigsby	Dem.	36	Milwaukee	2004
07	19	Jon Richards	Dem.	47	Milwaukee	1998
07	20	Christine Sinicki	Dem.	50	Bay View	1998
07	21	Mark Honadel	Rep.	54	South Milwaukee	2003
08	22	Sandy Pasch	Dem.	56	Whitefish Bay	2008
08	23	Jim Ott	Rep.	63	Mequon	2006
08	24	Dan Knodl	Rep.	52	Germantown	2008
09	25	Bob Ziegelbauer	Ind.	59	Manitowoc	1992
09	26	Mike Endsley	Rep.	48	Sheboygan	2010
09	27	Steve Kestell	Rep.	55	Herman	1998
10	28	Erik Severson	Rep.	36	Star Prairie	2010
10	29	John Murtha	Rep.	59	Baldwin	2006
10	30	Dean Knudson	Rep.	49	Hudson	2010
11	31	Stephen Nass	Rep.	58	Whitewater	1990
11	32	Tyler August	Rep.	27	Walworth	2010
11	33	Chris Kapenga	Rep.	38	Delafield	2010
12	34	Dan Meyer	Rep.	62	Eagle River	2000
12	35	Tom Tiffany	Rep.	53	Hazelhurst	2010
12	36	Jeffrey Mursau	Rep.	56	Crivitz	2004
13	37	Andy Jorgensen	Dem.	43	Fort Atkinson	2006
13	38	Joel Kleefisch	Rep.	39	Oconomowoc	2004
13	39	Jeff Fitzgerald	Rep.	44	Horicon	2000
14	40	Kevin David Petersen	Rep.	46	Waupaca	2006
14	41	Joan Ballweg	Rep.	58	Markesan	2004
14	42	Fred Clark	Dem.	51	Baraboo	2008
15	43	Evan Wynn	Rep.	48	Whitewater	2010
15	44	Joe Knilans	Rep.	46	Janesville	2010
15	45	Amy Loudenbeck	Rep.	41	Clinton	2010
16	46	Gary Hebl	Dem.	59	Sun Prairie	2004
16	47	Keith Ripp	Rep.	49	Lodi	2008
16	48	Joe Parisi (res. Apr. 14, 2011)	Dem.	50	Madison	2004
16	48	Chris Taylor (from Aug. 9, 2011)	Dem.	43	Madison	2011
17	49	Travis Tranel	Rep.	25	Cuba City	2010
17	50	Edward Brooks	Rep.	68	Reedsburg	2008
17	51	Howard Marklein	Rep.	56	Spring Green	2010
18	52	Jeremy Thiesfeldt	Rep.	44	Fond du Lac	2010
18	53	Richard Spanbauer	Rep.	64	Oshkosh	2008
18	54	Gordon Hintz	Dem.	37	Oshkosh	2006
19	55	Dean Kaufert	Rep.	53	Neenah	1990
19	56	Michelle Litjens	Rep.	38	Appleton	2010
19	57	Penny Bernard Schaber	Dem.	57	Appleton	2008
20	58	Patricia Strachota	Rep.	55	West Bend	2004
20	59	Daniel LeMahieu	Rep.	64	Cascade	2002
20	60	--Vacant until May 17, 2011--				
20	60	Duey Stroebel (from May 17, 2011)	Rep.	51	Cedarburg	2011
21	61	Robert L. Turner	Dem.	63	Racine	1990
21	62	Cory Mason	Dem.	37	Racine	2006
21	63	Robin Vos	Rep.	42	Burlington	2004
22	64	Peter Barca	Dem.	55	Kenosha	1993
22	65	John Steinbrink	Dem.	61	Pleasant Prairie	1996
22	66	Samantha Kerkman	Rep.	36	Randall	2000
23	67	Tom Larson	Rep.	62	Colfax	2010
23	68	Kathy Bernier	Rep.	54	Chippewa Falls	2010
23	69	Scott Suder	Rep.	42	Abbotsford	1998
24	70	Amy Sue Vruwink	Dem.	35	Milladore	2002
24	71	Louis Molepske	Dem.	36	Stevens Point	2003
24	72	Scott Krug	Rep.	35	Wisconsin Rapids	2010
25	73	Nick Milroy	Dem.	36	Superior	2008
25	74	Janet Bewley	Dem.	59	Ashland	2010
25	75	Roger Rivard	Rep.	58	Rice Lake	2010
26	76	Terese Berceau	Dem.	60	Madison	1998
26	77	Brett Hulsey	Dem.	51	Madison	2010
26	78	Mark Pocan	Dem.	46	Madison	1998
27	79	Sondy Pope-Roberts	Dem.	60	Verona	2002
27	80	Janis Ringhand	Dem.	60	Evansville	2010
27	81	Kelda Roys	Dem.	31	Madison	2008
28	82	Jeff Stone	Rep.	49	Greendale	1998
28	83	--Vacant until May 17, 2011--				
28	83	David Craig (from May 17, 2011)	Rep.	32	Vernon	2011
28	84	Mike Kuglitsch	Rep.	50	New Berlin	2010
29	85	Donna Seidel	Dem.	60	Wausau	2004
29	86	Jerry Petrowski (res. Jul. 17, 2012)	Rep.	60	Marathon	1998
29	86	--Vacant from Jul. 17, 2012--				
29	87	Mary Williams	Rep.	61	Medford	2002
30	88	John Klenke	Rep.	52	Green Bay	2010
30	89	John Nygren	Rep.	46	Marinette	2006
30	90	Karl Van Roy	Rep.	72	Howard	2002
31	91	Chris Danou	Dem.	43	Trempealeau	2008
31	92	Mark Radcliffe	Dem.	39	Black River Falls	2008
31	93	Warren Petryk	Rep.	55	Eleva	2010
32	94	--Vacant until May 17, 2011--				
32	94	Steve Doyle (from May 17, 2011)	Dem.	52	Onalaska	2011
32	95	Jennifer Shilling (res. Aug. 25, 2011)	Dem.	41	La Crosse	2000
32	95	Jill Billings (from Nov. 21, 2011)	Dem.	49	La Crosse	2011
32	96	Lee Nerison	Rep.	58	Westby	2004
33	97	Bill Kramer	Rep.	45	Waukesha	2006
33	98	Paul Farrow (res. Dec. 14, 2012)	Rep.	46	Pewaukee	2010
33	98	--Vacant from Dec. 14, 2012--				
33	99	Don Pridemore	Rep.	64	Hartford	2004

== Changes from the 99th Legislature ==
=== Open seats ===
On April 14, 2011, Joe Parisi resigned from the 48th District after being elected Dane County Executive.
