= Jill Billings =

21st century American politician (born 1962)

Member of the Wisconsin State Assembly from the 95th district
- Incumbent
- Assumed office November 21, 2011
- Preceded by: Jennifer Shilling

Member of the Board of Supervisors of La Crosse County, Wisconsin
- In office April 2004 – Current

Personal details
- Born: January 19, 1962 (age 64) Rochester, Minnesota
- Party: Democratic
- Children: 2
- Education: Augsburg College (BA)
- Profession: Educator, Legislator
- Website: Official website

Jill Elizabeth Billings (born January 19, 1962) is an American Democratic politician and retired educator from La Crosse, Wisconsin. She is a member of the Wisconsin State Assembly, representing Wisconsin's 95th Assembly district since November 2011. She is also a former member of the La Crosse County Board of Supervisors.

== Early life and career ==
Billings was born in Rochester, Minnesota; both of her grandfathers had been candidates for mayor. She studied communication and English at Augsburg College, before moving to La Crosse in 1990. She spent seven years as a teacher of English and citizenship to Hmong immigrants.

She worked on La Crosse County's land use plan, helped established a special rehabilitation court for persons convicted of driving while intoxicated, and worked on the county's Economic Development Fund. Between 2004 and 2012, she was a member of the La Crosse County board of supervisors, becoming vice chair of the County Health and Human Services Board and head of the Family Policy Board Executive Committee.

== Legislative race ==
On November 8, 2011, Billings was elected to the Wisconsin State Assembly in a special election in the 95th Assembly District (the city of La Crosse and portions of the towns of Campbell and Shelby), succeeding fellow Democrat Jennifer Shilling, who replaced Senator Dan Kapanke in the Wisconsin State Senate following a successful recall election against him. Billings took 72.5% of the vote against Republican David Drewes, a small government advocate and supporter of Governor Scott Walker. The district has elected Democrats to the Assembly consistently since 1974.

== Personal life ==
Billings has two children, Josh and Zoe.

== Electoral history ==
=== Wisconsin Assembly (2011–present) ===
Year	Election	Date	Elected				Defeated				Total	Plurality
2011	Primary	Oct. 11	Jill Billings	Democratic	2,735	51.98%	Christine J. Clair	Dem.	1,681	31.95%	5,262	1,054
2011	Primary	Oct. 11	Jill Billings	Democratic	2,735	51.98%	Nick Charles	Dem.	431	8.19%	5,262	1,054
2011	Primary	Oct. 11	Jill Billings	Democratic	2,735	51.98%	David Krump	Dem.	415	7.89%	5,262	1,054
2011	Special	Nov. 8	Jill Billings	Democratic	5,940	72.47%	David A. Drewes	Rep.	2,247	27.42%	15,596	1,150
2012	General	Nov. 6	Jill Billings (inc)	Democratic	22,531	98.89%	--unopposed--				22,783	22,279
2014	General	Nov. 4	Jill Billings (inc)	Democratic	17,037	100.0%	--unopposed--				17,037	17,037
2016	General	Nov. 8	Jill Billings (inc)	Democratic	23,020	100.0%	--unopposed--				23,020	23,020
2018	General	Nov. 6	Jill Billings (inc)	Democratic	21,989	100.0%	--unopposed--				21,989	21,989
2020	General	Nov. 3	Jill Billings (inc)	Democratic	19,684	65.63%	Jerome Gundersen	Rep.	10,271	34.25%	29,992	9,413
2022	General	Nov. 8	Jill Billings (inc)	Democratic	16,897	66.83%	Chris Woodard	Rep.	8,366	33.09%	25,285	8,531
2024	General	Nov. 5	Jill Billings (inc)	Democratic	16,461	51.99%	Cedric Schnitzler	Rep.	15,191	47.98%	31,660	1,270

Wisconsin State Assembly
Preceded by Jennifer Shilling	Member of the Wisconsin State Assembly from the 95th district November 21, 2011 – present	Incumbent
