= 2016 Wisconsin Senate election =

- November 8, 2016

16 of 33 seats in the Wisconsin State Senate 17 seats needed for a majority
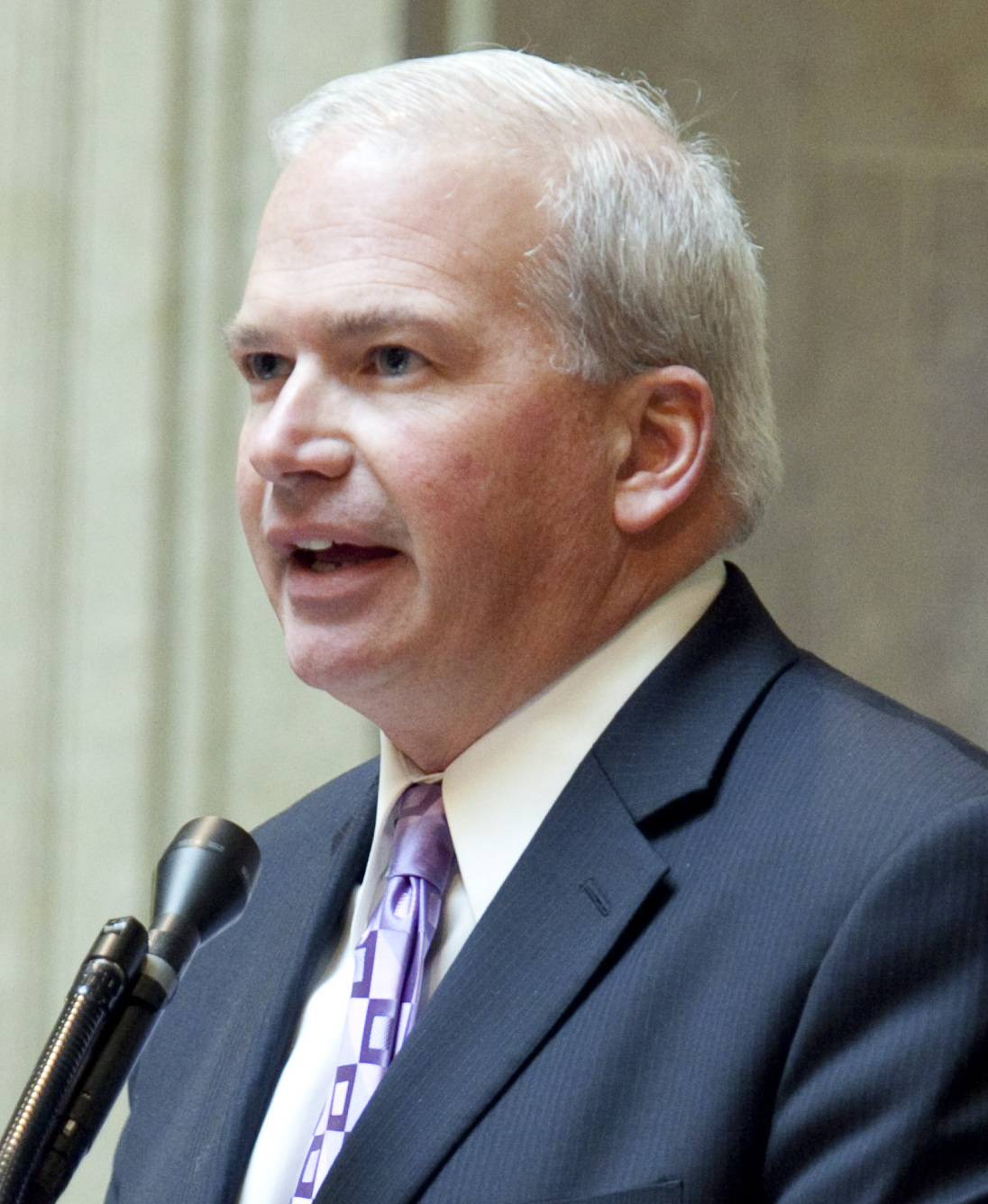

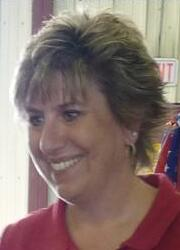
	Majority party	Minority party
Leader	Scott Fitzgerald	Jennifer Shilling
Party	Republican	Democratic
Leader since	January 1, 2007	January 5, 2015
Leader's seat	13th–Juneau	32nd–La Crosse
Last election	11 seats, 53.87%	6 seats, 45.80%
Seats before	19	14
Seats won	9	7
Seats after	20	13
Seat change	▲1	▼1
Popular vote	618,589	639,545
Percentage	48.62%	50.26%
- Results of the elections: Republican hold Republican gain Democratic hold No election
President before election
Mary Lazich
Republican
Elected President
Roger Roth
Republican

The 2016 Wisconsin Senate elections were held on Tuesday, November 8, 2016, at the Fall general election in Wisconsin. Sixteen of the 33 seats in the Wisconsin Senate were up for election—the even-numbered districts. Before the election, Republicans held 18 seats, Democrats held 14 seats, and 1 seat was vacant. Of the seats up for election, 8 were held by Democrats, 7 were held by Republicans, and 1 was vacant due to the recent death of a Republican member. The primary election was held on August 9, 2016.

Republicans consolidated their control of the Senate, flipping one Democrat-held seat, and entered the 103rd Wisconsin Legislature with 20 of 33 Senate seats.

== Results summary ==
Statewide results of the 2016 Wisconsin State Senate election:

Seats		Party (majority caucus shading)		Total
Seats		Democratic	Republican	Total
Last election (2014)		6	11	17
Total after last election (2014)		14	19	33
Total before this election		14	18	32
Up for election		8	8	16
of which:	Incumbent retiring	1	0	1
of which:	Vacated	0	1	1
of which:	Unopposed	5	3	8
This election		7	9	16
Change from last election		▼1	▲1	
Total after this election		13	20	33
Change in total		▼1	▲2	

Party	Candi- dates	Votes		Seats		
Party	Candi- dates	No.	%	No.	+/–	%
Republican Party	11	618,589	48.62%	9	▲1	56.25%
Democratic Party	13	639,545	50.26%	7	▼1	43.75%
Integrity Party	1	2,093	0.16%	0	Steady	0.00%
Scattering		12,126	0.95%	0	Steady	0.00%
Total	25	1,272,353	100.00%	16	Steady	100.00%

Popular vote
Democratic	50.26%
Republican	48.62%
Other	1.11%

Senate seats
Republican	56.25%
Democratic	43.75%

=== Close races ===
Seats where the margin of victory was under 10%:

1. State Senate district 32, 0.07%
2. State Senate district 30, 2.60%
3. State Senate district 24, 4.69% (gain)

== Outgoing incumbents ==
=== Retiring ===
- Nikiya Harris Dodd (D–Milwaukee), representing District 6 since 2013, did not run for re-election.

=== Vacated ===
- Rick Gudex (R–Fond du Lac), representing District 18 since 2013, did not run for re-election, then died by suicide before the election on October 12, 2016.

== Predictions ==
Source	Ranking	As of
Governing	Lean R	October 12, 2016

== Candidates and results ==
Dist.	Incumbent				This race (Note: Not all totals add up to 100% due to scattering)
Dist.	Member	Party	First elected	Status	Candidates
02	Robert Cowles	Rep.	1987 (special)	Incumbent re-elected	▌ ✓ Robert Cowles (Rep.) 65%; ▌John Powers (Dem.) 34.95%
04	Lena Taylor	Dem.	2004	Incumbent re-elected	▌ ✓ Lena Taylor (Dem.) 98.33%
06	Nikiya Harris Dodd	Dem.	2012	Incumbent retired. New member elected. Democratic hold.	▌ ✓ LaTonya Johnson (Dem.) 98.89%
08	Alberta Darling	Rep.	1992	Incumbent re-elected	▌ ✓ Alberta Darling (Rep.) 95.51%
10	Sheila Harsdorf	Rep.	2000	Incumbent re-elected	▌ ✓ Sheila Harsdorf (Rep.) 63.2%; ▌Diane Odeen (Dem.) 36.76%
12	Tom Tiffany	Rep.	2012	Incumbent re-elected	▌ ✓ Tom Tiffany (Rep.) 62.92%; ▌Bryan Van Stippen (Dem.) 37.04%
14	Luther Olsen	Rep.	2004	Incumbent re-elected	▌ ✓ Luther Olsen (Rep.) 57.05%; ▌Brian Smith (Dem.) 42.89%
16	Mark Miller	Dem.	2004	Incumbent re-elected	▌Mark Miller (Dem.) 98.39%
18	Vacant (Note: Incumbent Rick Gudex (Rep.) died on October 12, 2016)			Incumbent died. New member elected. Republican hold.	▌ ✓ Dan Feyen (Rep.) 55.83%; ▌Mark Harris (Dem.) 44.06%
20	Glenn Grothman	Rep.	2004	Incumbent re-elected	▌ ✓ Glenn Grothman (Rep.) 98.21%
22	Robert Wirch	Dem.	1996	Incumbent re-elected	▌ ✓ Robert Wirch (Dem.) 98.16%
24	Julie Lassa	Dem.	2003 (special)	Incumbent defeated. New member elected. Republican gain	▌ ✓ Patrick Testin (Rep.) 52.32%; ▌Julie Lassa (Dem.) 47.63%
26	Fred Risser	Dem.	1962 (special)	Incumbent re-elected	▌ ✓ Fred Risser (Rep.) 98.57%
28	Mary Lazich	Rep.	1998 (special)	Incumbent retired. New member elected. Republican hold.	▌ ✓ Dave Craig (Rep.) 98.10%
30	Dave Hansen	Dem.	2000	Incumbent re-elected	▌ ✓ Dave Hansen (Dem.) 51.27%; ▌Eric Wimberger (Rep.) 48.67%
32	Jennifer Shilling	Dem.	2011 (recall)	Incumbent re-elected	▌ ✓ Jennifer Shilling (Dem.) 48.86%; ▌Dan Kapanke (Rep.) 48.79%; ▌Chip DeNure (Ind.) 2.35%

== Detailed results ==
=== District 18 ===
Incumbent Republican Rick Gudex died on October 12, 2016, but had previously declined to seek re-election, leaving the district open. Within minutes of Gudex announcing his retirement, Fond du Lac county Republican chair Dan Feyen announced a campaign to succeed him. Two months later, Republican pastor Mark Elliott also announced a campaign. Despite what was expected to be a competitive primary, Feyen defeated Elliott by a 12-point margin.

In the Democratic primary, Winnebago County county executive Mark Harris announced a campaign to unseat Gudex, and was later followed by Oshkosh educator John Lemberger. The two candidates ran on two ends of the ideological spectrum, with Harris campaigning as a fiscally conservative democrat, while Lemberger was described as a progressive candidate similar to 2016 presidential candidate Bernie Sanders. Harris defeated Lemberger by a wide margin.

In February, the Republican-controlled legislature passed a bill which would bar state lawmakers from simultaneously serving as county executives. The bill was criticized on partisan grounds as the only political candidate this would have applied to, Harris, was a Democrat. Despite the bill's passage, Harris vowed to stay in the race.

Following the primaries, the race was expected to be competitive, despite the district's historical Republican lean. During his campaign, Harris touted his record as county executive, while Feyen campaigned on bringing jobs to the district. Throughout much of the campaign, Harris held a cash advantage over Feyen. Feyen defeated Harris by an 11-point margin.

District 18 Republican primary
Party	Candidate	Votes	%
Republican	Dan Feyen	5,225	55.97
Republican	Mark Elliott	4,108	44.00
Write-in		3	0.03
Total votes		9,336	100.0

District 18 Democratic primary
Party	Candidate	Votes	%
Democratic	Mark L. Harris	5,165	74.58
Democratic	John Lemberger	1,758	25.39
Write-in		2	0.03
Total votes		6,925	100.0

District 18 general election
Party	Candidate	Votes	%
Republican	Dan Feyen	46,076	55.83
Democratic	Mark L. Harris	36,366	44.06
Write-in		87	0.11
Total votes		82,529	100.0
Republican hold			

== See also ==
- 2016 Wisconsin elections
  - 2016 Wisconsin State Assembly election
  - 2016 United States presidential election in Wisconsin
  - 2016 United States Senate election in Wisconsin
  - 2016 United States House of Representatives elections in Wisconsin
- 2016 United States elections
- Wisconsin Senate
- Elections in Wisconsin
- Redistricting in Wisconsin
