= John Medinger =

American politician

John D. Medinger

49th Mayor of La Crosse, Wisconsin
- In office April 15, 1997 – April 19, 2005
- Preceded by: Patrick Zielke
- Succeeded by: Mark Johnsrud

Member of the Wisconsin State Assembly
- In office January 7, 1985 – January 4, 1993
- Preceded by: Midge Miller
- Succeeded by: Mark Meyer
- Constituency: 95th district
- In office January 3, 1983 – January 7, 1985
- Preceded by: Robert J. Larson
- Succeeded by: Jim Holperin
- Constituency: 34th district
- In office January 3, 1977 – January 3, 1983
- Preceded by: Paul Offner
- Succeeded by: Midge Miller
- Constituency: 95th district

Member of the Board of Supervisors of La Crosse County, Wisconsin, from the 14th district
- In office 2006–2012
- Preceded by: Mitzi Parr

Personal details
- Born: April 26, 1948 (age 78)
- Party: Democratic
- Spouse: Dee Medinger
- Education: University of Wisconsin–La Crosse (BA, MA)
- Occupation: Associate Lecturer of Political Science
- Profession: Teacher, Politician

John Donald Medinger (born April 26, 1948) is an American teacher, businessman, and Democratic politician from La Crosse, Wisconsin. He was the 49th mayor of La Crosse (1997–2005) and represented the area for 16 years in the Wisconsin State Assembly, from 1977 to 1993. He also served six years on the La Crosse County board of supervisors.

== Background ==
Born in La Crosse, Wisconsin, Medinger graduated from Aquinas High School. Medinger received his bachelor's and master's degree from University of Wisconsin–La Crosse. He was a teacher, gas station operator, and a volunteer in VISTA.

== Political life ==
Medinger was elected to the Wisconsin State Assembly in 1976, as a Democrat, representing the 95th district and served in that post for 16 years. He eventually became Assistant Majority Leader of the Assembly.

After he left the Assembly in 1992, he worked for United States Senator Russ Feingold until 1996. In the spring of 1997, after the retirement of longtime La Crosse Mayor Patrick Zielke, Medinger ran for mayor. He won the election over political newcomer Dan Herber. In 2001, he won reelection in a landslide over alderman Gerald Every. In 2005, he retired from the Mayor's Office.

After leaving the mayor's Office, Medinger worked in U.S. Senator Herb Kohl's La Crosse office. In December 2012 Medinger announced he would run again for La Crosse mayor in the spring of 2013, but dropped out of the race a few days later.

== Post-politics ==
Medinger worked at the University of Wisconsin–La Crosse as an associate lecturer of political science.

Medinger then served as a member of the La Crosse County Board from 2006 until the spring of 2012. He also served as United States Senator Herb Kohl's La Crosse area representative. Then he was hired to be United States Senator Tammy Baldwin's La Crosse's area representative. Medinger retired from that position on February 20, 2017.

John was names Marshal of the 133rd La Crosse Labor Day Parade and Festival held on Monday, September 2, 2024, in recognition of his lifelong commitment to working families in the Coulee Region and beyond.
