= Doris Hanson =

American politician and real estate broker (1925–2006)

7th Secretary of the Wisconsin Department of Administration
- In office January 3, 1983 – January 5, 1987
- Governor: Tony Earl
- Preceded by: Kenneth E. Lindner
- Succeeded by: James R. Klauser

Member of the Wisconsin State Assembly from the 48th district
- In office January 4, 1993 – January 4, 1999
- Preceded by: Sue Rohan
- Succeeded by: Mark F. Miller

Personal details
- Born: October 24, 1925 Madison, Wisconsin, U.S.
- Died: November 8, 2006 (aged 81) McFarland, Wisconsin, U.S.
- Resting place: Roselawn Memorial Park, Monona, Wisconsin
- Party: Democratic
- Education: University of Wisconsin–Madison
- Occupation: Realtor

Doris Jean Hanson (October 24, 1925 – November 8, 2006) was an American realtor, politician, and public administrator. She was the 7th secretary of the Wisconsin Department of Administration, and the first woman to hold that office. Later she was a member of the Wisconsin State Assembly, representing the east side of the city of Madison and central Dane County.

== Biography ==
Born in Madison, Wisconsin, Hanson went to University of Wisconsin–Madison. Governor Tony Earl appointed Hanson the first woman to be secretary of the Wisconsin Department of Administration. Hanson served as president of the village of McFarland, Wisconsin, from 1991 to 1995, and she was on the village board. Hanson served in the Wisconsin State Assembly from 1992 to 1998. After her retirement, Hanson served as director of TEACH Wisconsin.

Wisconsin State Assembly
Preceded by Sue Rohan	Member of the Wisconsin State Assembly from the 48th district January 4, 1993 – January 4, 1999	Succeeded by Mark F. Miller
Government offices
Preceded by Kenneth E. Lindner	Secretary of the Wisconsin Department of Administration; January 3, 1983 – January 5, 1987	Succeeded by James R. Klauser
