= Midge Miller =

20th century American politician and activist, member of the Wisconsin State Assembly

Marjorie Miller

Member of the Wisconsin State Assembly
- In office January 1, 1983 – January 1, 1985
- Preceded by: John Medinger
- Succeeded by: John Medinger
- Constituency: 95th district
- In office January 1, 1973 – January 1, 1983
- Preceded by: District established
- Succeeded by: Calvin Potter
- Constituency: 77th district
- In office January 1, 1971 – January 1, 1973
- Preceded by: Robert Uehling
- Succeeded by: District abolished
- Constituency: Dane 3rd district

Personal details
- Born: Marjorie Cavins; June 8, 1922 Morgantown, West Virginia, U.S.
- Died: April 17, 2009 (aged 86) Madison, Wisconsin, U.S.
- Party: Democratic
- Spouses: Harry Dean Leeper; (m. 1944; died 1954); Edward Ernst Miller; (m. 1963; died 1995)
- Children: 4 with Harry Leeper; 5 stepchildren, including Mark F. Miller
- Education: University of Wisconsin–Madison

Marjorie "Midge" Miller (June 8, 1922 – April 17, 2009) was an American politician and activist for peace, nuclear non-proliferation, and women's rights. She was a member of the Wisconsin State Assembly for 14 years, from 1971 until 1985, and ran the Wisconsin primary campaign of U.S. Senator Eugene McCarthy in his 1968 anti-Vietnam War bid against incumbent President Lyndon B. Johnson.

== Background ==
Miller was born Marjorie Cavins in Morgantown, West Virginia. Her first husband, Harry Dean Leeper (1920–1954), died in a shipwreck during a typhoon while the couple was working as missionaries in Japan. She returned to the United States, where she attended graduate school at the University of Wisconsin–Madison. While working for the United States Senate campaign of Gaylord Nelson, in 1962, she met University of Wisconsin Professor Ed Miller, who was also widowed. The two married in 1963. Midge served in the Wisconsin State Assembly from 1971 to 1985 and was a Democrat. Miller received her bachelor's and master's degree's from the University of Wisconsin–Madison. She served as assistant dean and coordinator for religious activities at University of Wisconsin–Madison.

== Politics ==
Miller opposed the Vietnam War in the 1960s. She was an early supporter of the 1968 presidential candidacy of United States Senator Eugene McCarthy (D-Minnesota), and eventually headed his Wisconsin campaign. It is believed that she was a major influence in convincing an initially reluctant Senator McCarthy to run for president, based in large part on his opposition to the Vietnam War. McCarthy was discounted by the political establishment as an underdog with virtually no chance of success, but Miller proved to be prescient in her belief that the time was right for his candidacy. In January of that year, McCarthy's opposition to the war resonated in a major way with voters in the 1968 New Hampshire presidential primary. Although McCarthy lost, he came in a close second to incumbent President Lyndon Johnson. With Midge Miller's support, McCarthy went on to defeat Johnson in the then-crucial Wisconsin primary the next month. Johnson, sensing in McCarthy's successes the devastating effect of the profundity of Democratic voter's disagreement with his Vietnam policy, made a surprise announcement on March 31, 1968, that he would not seek re-election.

This was just one example of the impact upon the national scene by the seven-term Wisconsin legislator, who defeated four well-known males for a state assembly seat long held by a Republican incumbent in 1970. An early leader in the national movement for women's rights, she counted among her admiring colleagues such movement leaders as Gloria Steinem and Bella Abzug. As a young woman who chose to reach out to the Japanese people following the Second World War by choosing to live with her family in the nuclear-bomb-produced shadows that remained of the cities of Hiroshima and Nagasaki, and she was internationally recognized for her lifelong devotion to the interrelated causes of nuclear non-proliferation and peace. Her "retirement" from the legislature in 1985 began another chapter in her activism, when she established the Madison Institute, a think-tank designed to counter the growing influence of the Right Wing in American politics.

As Madison's Capital Times associate editor John Nichols wrote upon her death, "Midge Miller changed America and the world. She made presidents quake in their boots. She made political parties reflect the will of their members rather than the bosses. She made a place for women in the electoral process -- and in the governing of the land. Then she got busy."

== September 11, 2001 ==
On September 11, 2001, when terrorists attacked the World Trade Center and The Pentagon, Miller was in a Senate office building on Capitol Hill. She had used a tax rebate provided by the new administration of George W. Bush and Dick Cheney to travel to Washington, D.C. to lobby against Bush's proposed Star Wars national missile defense program.

They told us all that they were evacuating the building. We were shuffled out ... [T]he guys out in front said the Pentagon was smoking. It sounded horrible. But I couldn't do anything about that, so I thought I'd better keep on lobbying ... [I] was saying, 'Look, we've just been given all the evidence we need that President Bush's national missile defense plan is not the answer. If you develop these Star Wars weapons in the heavens, the people who want to attack the United States will find another way to do it.'

— Anecdote from Midge Miller's obituary in The Capital Times

== Death ==
Midge Miller died in Madison, Wisconsin, aged 86, following a battle with cancer. She was preceded in death by her husband, Ed, who died in 1995.
