= Sue Rohan =

20th century American politician

Member of the Wisconsin State Assembly from the 48th district
- In office January 7, 1985 – June 1, 1992
- Preceded by: John Volk
- Succeeded by: Doris Hanson

Personal details
- Born: November 23, 1952 (age 73) Appleton, Wisconsin, U.S.
- Party: Democratic
- Spouse: Paul Magnuson (m. 1974; div. 1985)
- Children: 2
- Education: University of Wisconsin–Madison; George Washington University
- Occupation: Educator, policy advisor

Sue Anne Rohan (born November 23, 1952) is an American retired educator, healthcare industry policy advisor, and Democratic politician from Madison, Wisconsin. She served four terms in the Wisconsin State Assembly, representing the 48th Assembly district from 1985 to 1993. During the presidency of George W. Bush, she served as director of congressional hearings and policy presentations at the Centers for Medicare & Medicaid Services. She subsequently worked for 10 years as a senior policy advisor at Health Care Service Corporation.

Between 1974 and 1988 she went by her married name Sue Rohan Magnuson.

== Biography ==
Rohan was born in Appleton, Wisconsin, in 1952. As a child, she moved to Wausau, Wisconsin, with her parents, where she graduated from Wausau High School in 1970. She went on to attend the University of Wisconsin–Madison and earned her bachelor's degree in education in 1973. She remained in Madison, Wisconsin, after graduation and went to work as a teacher in the Madison Metropolitan School District.

== Political career ==
In 1983, she was elected to her first public office, when she ran for Madison Common Council.

In 1984, the Wisconsin Legislature had just gone through another redistricting. Charles Chvala—the incumbent state representative who resided in what had just been redrawn as the 48th Assembly district—announced that he would instead run for state senate. That same day, Rohan announced her candidacy for Wisconsin State Assembly in the 48th Assembly district seat. The heavily Democratic district eventually drew 8 other candidates into the Democratic primary; Rohan prevailed with 34% of the vote in the primary and went on to win 74% of the vote in the general election. She was re-elected three times, in 1986, 1988, and 1990.

While serving in the Legislature, Rohan returned to the University of Wisconsin and earned her master's degree in education administration in 1991. In 1992, she announced she would resign early, effective June 1, 1992, after receiving a job offer as an assistant to the president of the University of Wisconsin System.

== Later years ==
She left the University of Wisconsin after two years and went to work as an education specialist at the National Institute of Standards and Technology. In 2001, she moved to the Centers for Medicare & Medicaid Services where she was director of congressional hearings and policy presentations. She left government in 2006 and became vice president of the Academy of Health Information Professionals, then, in 2011, became a vice president of the Health Care Service Corporation. She moved to a senior advisor role in 2017, before retiring in 2021.

== Personal life and family ==
Sue Anne Rohan took the name Sue Rohan Magnuson when she married Paul Magnuson on August 3, 1974. They had two children together and were married about 11 years before filing for divorce in 1985. Sue subsequently reverted to using her maiden name.

Wisconsin State Assembly
Preceded by John Volk	Member of the Wisconsin State Assembly from the 48th district January 7, 1985 – June 1, 1992	Succeeded by Doris Hanson
