= Wisconsin's 95th Assembly district =

American legislative district in western Wisconsin

Wisconsin's 95th State Assembly district
- 2024 map defined in 2023 Wisc. Act 94; 2022 map defined in Johnson v. Wisconsin Elections Commission; 2011 map was defined in 2011 Wisc. Act 43
Assemblymember
Jill Billings; D–La Crosse
since November 21, 2011 (14 years)
- Demographics: 89.24% White; 2.22% Black; 3.79% Hispanic; 2.74% Asian; 1.5% Native American; 0.13% Hawaiian/Pacific Islander
- Population (2020) • Voting age: 59,805; 48,133
- Website: Official website
- Notes: Western Wisconsin

The 95th Assembly district of Wisconsin is one of 99 districts in the Wisconsin State Assembly. Located in western Wisconsin, the district comprises parts of central and eastern La Crosse County and western Monroe County. It includes the city of Sparta and much of the city of La Crosse, along with the villages of Bangor, Cashton, Melvina, Norwalk, and Rockland. The district includes the University of Wisconsin–La Crosse campus and Western Technical College. The district is represented by Democrat Jill Billings, since November 2011.

The 95th Assembly district is located within Wisconsin's 32nd Senate district, along with the 94th and 96th Assembly districts.

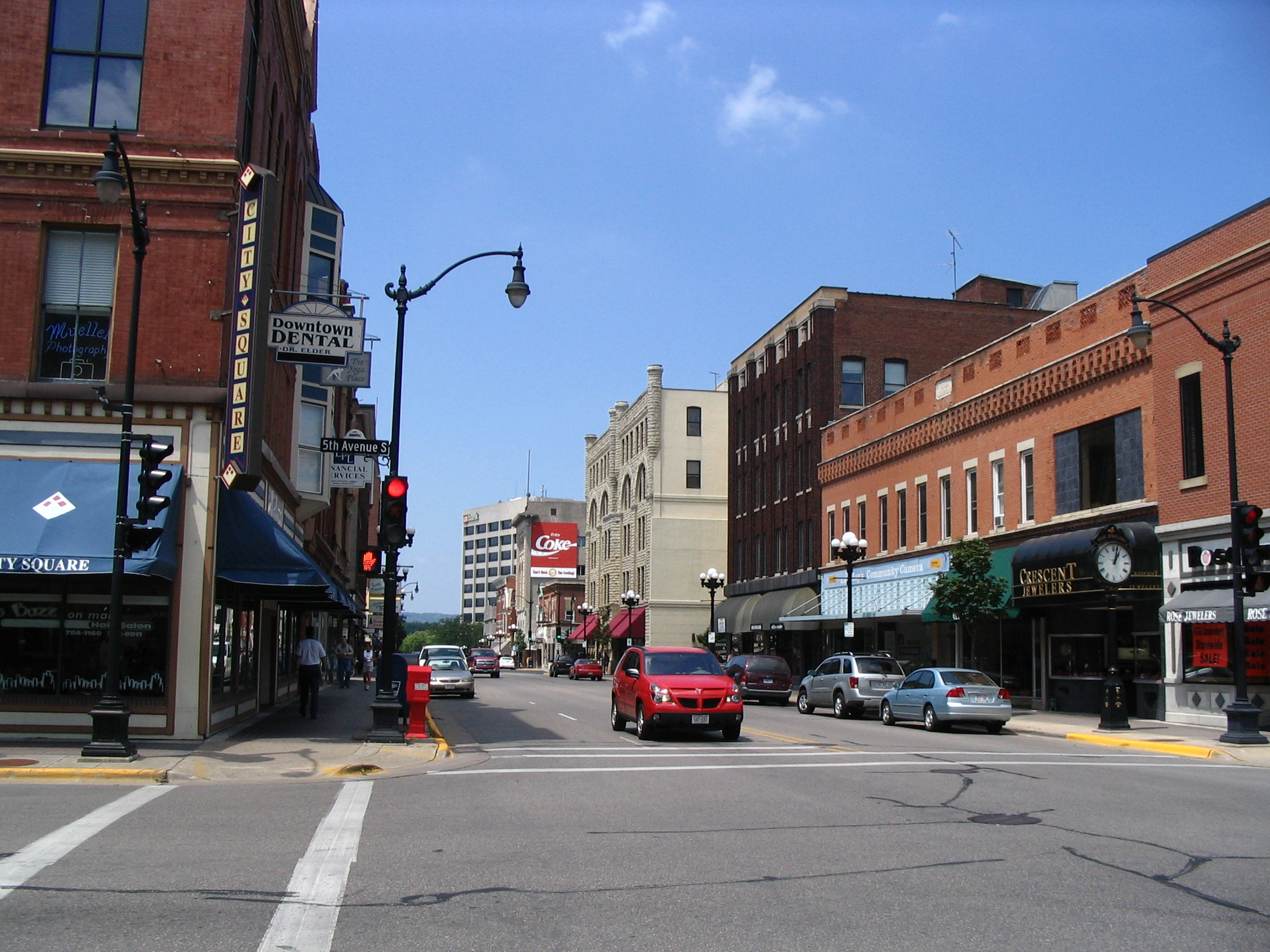
La Crosse Commercial Historic District

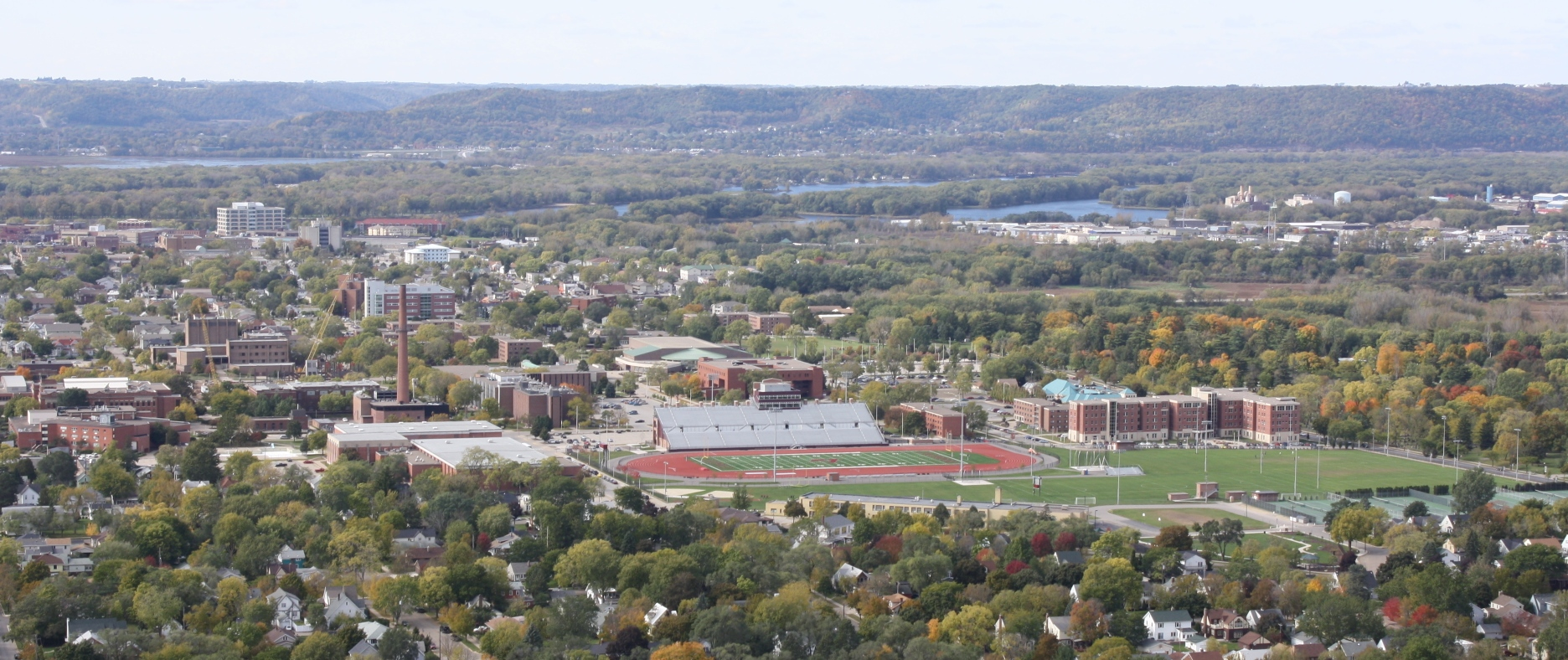
University of Wisconsin–La Crosse viewed from Grandad Bluff

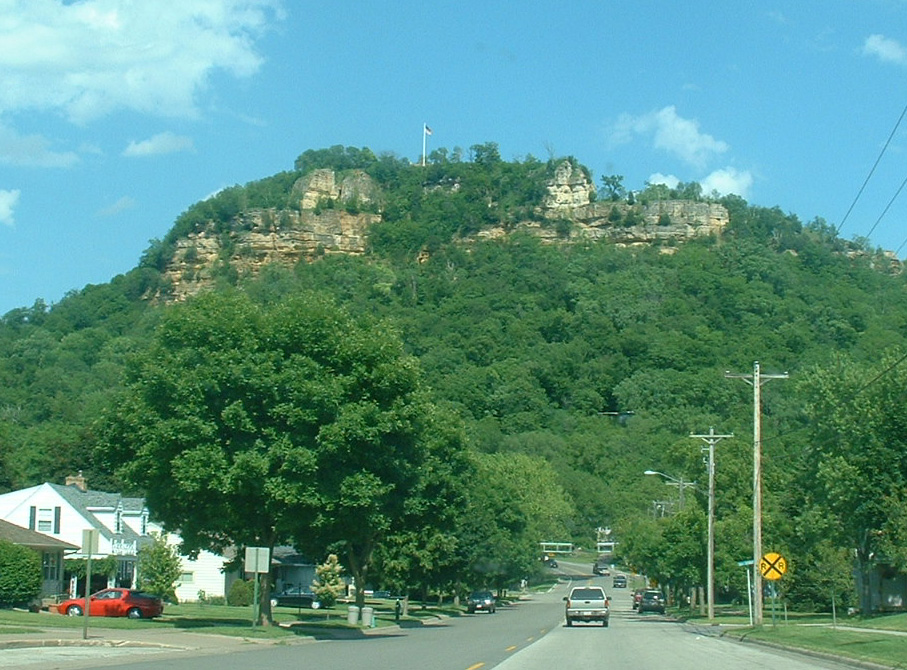
Grandad Bluff

== List of past representatives ==
List of representatives to the Wisconsin State Assembly from the 95th district
Member	Party	Residence	Counties represented	Term start	Term end	Ref.
District created
Lawrence R. Gibson	Rep.	La Crosse	La Crosse	January 1, 1973	January 6, 1975	
Paul Offner	Dem.	La Crosse	La Crosse	January 6, 1975	January 3, 1977	
John Medinger	Dem.	La Crosse	La Crosse	January 3, 1977	January 3, 1983	
Majorie Miller	Dem.	Madison	Dane	January 3, 1983	January 7, 1985	
John Medinger	Dem.	La Crosse	La Crosse	January 7, 1985	January 4, 1993	
Mark Meyer	Dem.	La Crosse	La Crosse	January 4, 1993	January 3, 2001	
Jennifer Shilling	Dem.	La Crosse	La Crosse	January 3, 2001	August 26, 2011	
--Vacant--			La Crosse	August 26, 2011	November 21, 2011	
Jill Billings	Dem.	La Crosse	La Crosse	November 21, 2011	Current	
