= Jennifer Shilling =

American politician, Wisconsin Senator

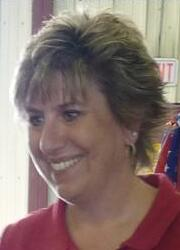
- Shilling in 2011

Minority Leader of the Wisconsin State Senate
- In office January 5, 2015 – April 24, 2020
- Preceded by: Chris Larson
- Succeeded by: Janet Bewley

Member of the Wisconsin Senate from the 32nd district
- In office August 25, 2011 – May 15, 2020
- Preceded by: Dan Kapanke
- Succeeded by: Brad Pfaff

Member of the Wisconsin State Assembly from the 95th district
- In office January 3, 2001 – August 25, 2011
- Preceded by: Mark Meyer
- Succeeded by: Jill Billings

Personal details
- Born: Jennifer Ehlenfeldt; July 4, 1969 (age 57) Oshkosh, Wisconsin, U.S.
- Party: Democratic
- Spouse: Chris Shilling (m. 2000)
- Children: 2
- Education: University of Wisconsin, La Crosse (BA)

Jennifer Shilling (née Ehlenfeldt; born July 4, 1969) is an American Democratic politician, lobbyist, and former state legislator. She was a member of the Wisconsin State Senate for nine years and was senate minority leader from 2015 to 2020. She previously served 10 years in the Wisconsin State Assembly, representing the city of La Crosse and La Crosse County.

== Background ==
Shilling was born Jennifer Ehlenfeldt on July 4, 1969, in Oshkosh, Wisconsin, to Richard and Lynn Ehlenfeldt. She graduated from Buffalo Grove High School in Buffalo Grove, Illinois. She served as a La Crosse County Supervisor from 1990 to 1992, and earned a joint B.A. in political science and public administration at the University of Wisconsin–La Crosse, graduating in 1992. Prior to being elected to the State Assembly, she worked as a legislative aide for Democratic United States Representative Ron Kind and later for State Representative Mark Meyer.

During her first week of work as an aide for Meyer, on January 8, 1993, Shilling's parents and five employees were murdered at the family's restaurant in Palatine, Illinois, during a robbery-murder now known as the Brown's Chicken massacre. Both of Shilling's younger sisters were also scheduled to be at the restaurant that night, but happened not to be present at the time of the killing.

== State Assembly ==
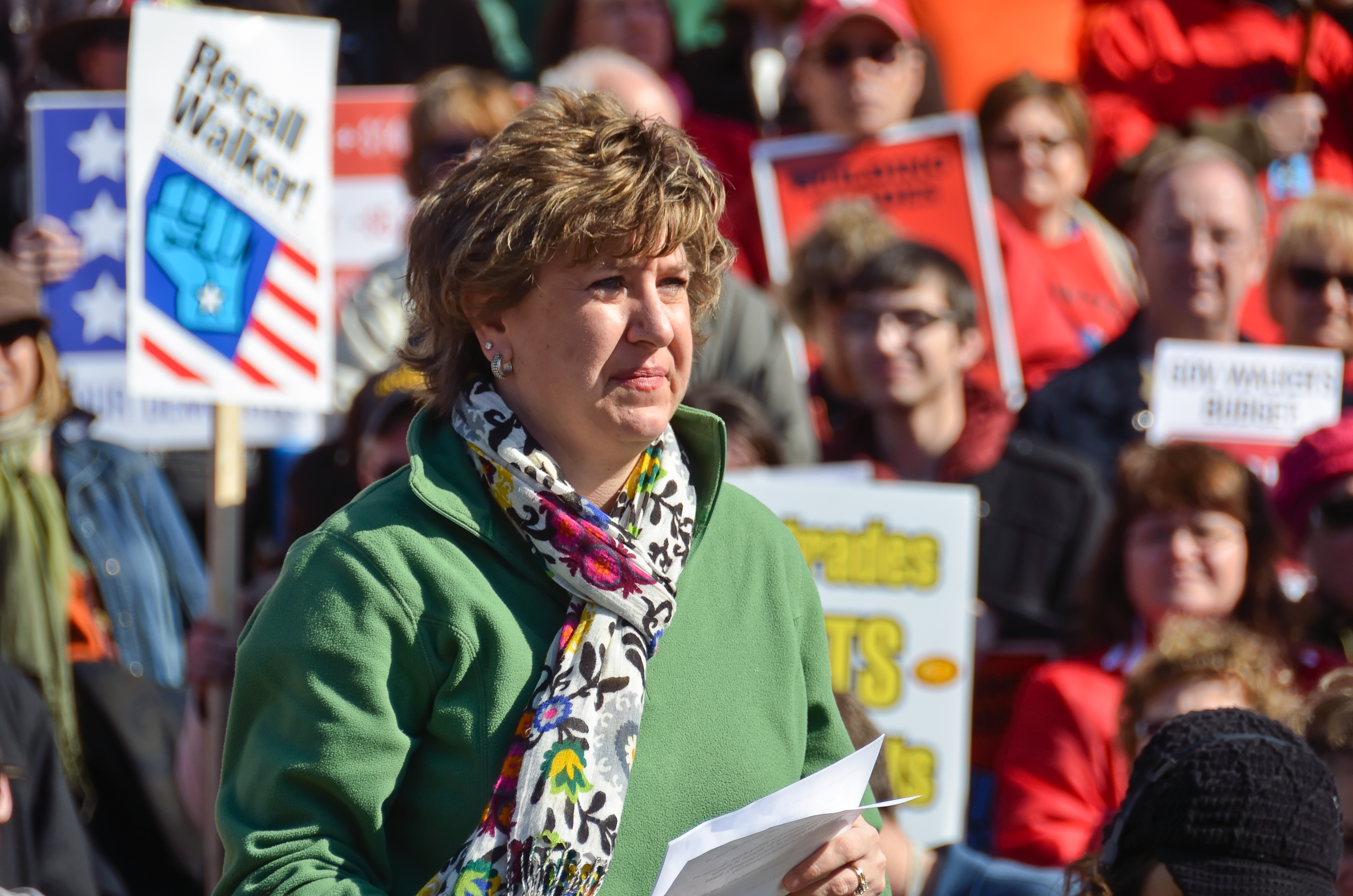
Shilling during the 2011 Wisconsin Protests (May 10, 2011)

In 2000, Ehlenfeldt was elected to succeed her boss, Mark Meyer, in the 95th Assembly District (Meyer was making a successful bid for the State Senate). She won her primary election with ease and won the general election with 13,789 votes to 11,530 for Republican nominee Deb Suchla. Subsequent to the November election, she married and had her name changed to Jennifer Shilling. She was assigned to the Assembly's standing committees on financial institutions, health, insurance and personal privacy, as well as the Legislative Advisory Committee to the Wisconsin-Minnesota Boundary Commission.

In the meantime, Shilling graduated from the Bowhay Institute on Legislative Leadership Development and the Citizen's Police Academy in La Crosse. In addition, she was also a member of the Wisconsin Technology Council Board of Directors. In 2001, she was selected to participate in the American Council of Young Political Leaders delegation to the Philippines, and in 2002 was the commencement speaker for graduation ceremonies at UW–La Crosse.

Re-elected in 2002, she remained on the financial institutions, health and insurance committees, and was also assigned to the committees on colleges and universities, and on highway safety. In 2008, running unopposed, Shilling won 97% of the vote.

== State Senate ==
On April 9, 2011, Shilling formally announced her intention to run in the Senate recall election against Republican Dan Kapanke. That summer, she defeated him in the recall election winning 55% of the vote, and took office August 26, 2011.

In March 2012, Bill Feehan, a La Crosse businessman and county board supervisor, announced that he would run against Shilling in the 2012 general election. In the newly redistricted district, Shilling took over 58% of the vote, with 51,091 votes to Feehan's 36,527.

In 2014, Shilling was elected Senate Minority Leader by fellow Democrats. Her top priorities include increasing spending on education, both at the K-12 and college level.

Shilling was re-elected in the November 2016 election.

In 2020, Shilling announced she would step down as Minority Leader and would not seek re-election in 2020. On May 15, 2020, Shilling resigned from the Wisconsin Senate.

== After the senate ==
Shilling announced after her senate resignation in 2020 that she would go to work as a lobbyist for Dairyland Power Cooperative—a La Crosse-based energy generation and transmission cooperative.

== Personal life ==
She and her husband, Chris, have two children.

== Electoral history ==
=== Wisconsin Assembly (2000–2010) ===
Year	Election	Date	Elected				Defeated				Total	Plurality
2000	Primary	Sep. 12	Jennifer Ehlenfeldt	Democratic	1,873	74.12%	Christine A. Kahlow	Dem.	650	25.72%	2,527	1,223
2000	General	Nov. 7	Jennifer Shilling	Democratic	13,789	54.31%	Deb Suchla	Rep.	11,530	45.41%	25,390	2,259
2002	General	Nov. 5	Jennifer Shilling (inc)	Democratic	10,686	63.92%	Jerome Gundersen	Rep.	6,004	35.91%	16,718	4,682
2004	General	Nov. 2	Jennifer Shilling (inc)	Democratic	22,879	98.60%	--Unopposed--				23,204	22,554
2006	General	Nov. 7	Jennifer Shilling (inc)	Democratic	15,925	98.44%	--Unopposed--				16,178	15,672
2008	General	Nov. 4	Jennifer Shilling (inc)	Democratic	22,341	97.29%	--Unopposed--				22,963	21,719
2010	General	Nov. 2	Jennifer Shilling (inc)	Democratic	11,893	63.53%	Nick Charles	Rep.	6,790	36.27%	18,720	5,103

=== Wisconsin Senate (2011–2016) ===
Year	Election	Date	Elected				Defeated				Total	Plurality
2011	Primary	Jul. 12	Jennifer Shilling	Democratic	25,340	70.19%	James D. Smith	Dem.	10,664	47.39%	36,102	14,676
2011	Recall	Aug. 9	Jennifer Shilling	Democratic	33,193	55.38%	Dan Kapanke (inc)	Rep.	26,724	44.58%	59,942	6,469
2012	General	Nov. 6	Jennifer Shilling (inc)	Democratic	51,153	58.28%	Bill Feehan	Rep.	36,545	41.64%	87,769	14,608
2016	Primary	Aug. 9	Jennifer Shilling (inc)	Democratic	10,957	91.45%	Jared William Landry	Dem.	1,024	8.55%	11,982	9,933
2016	General	Nov. 8	Jennifer Shilling (inc)	Democratic	43,585	48.86%	Dan Kapanke	Rep.	43,524	48.79%	89,206	61
2016	General	Nov. 8	Jennifer Shilling (inc)	Democratic	43,585	48.86%	Chip DeNure	Ind.	2,093	2.35%	89,206	61

Wisconsin State Assembly
Preceded by Mark Meyer	Member of the Wisconsin Assembly from the 95th district 2001–2011	Succeeded by Jill Billings
Wisconsin Senate
Preceded by Dan Kapanke	Member of the Wisconsin Senate from the 32nd district 2011–2020	Succeeded by Brad Pfaff
Preceded by Chris Larson	Minority Leader of the Wisconsin Senate; 2015–2020	Succeeded by Janet Bewley
