= Dan Kapanke =

American politician (born 1947)

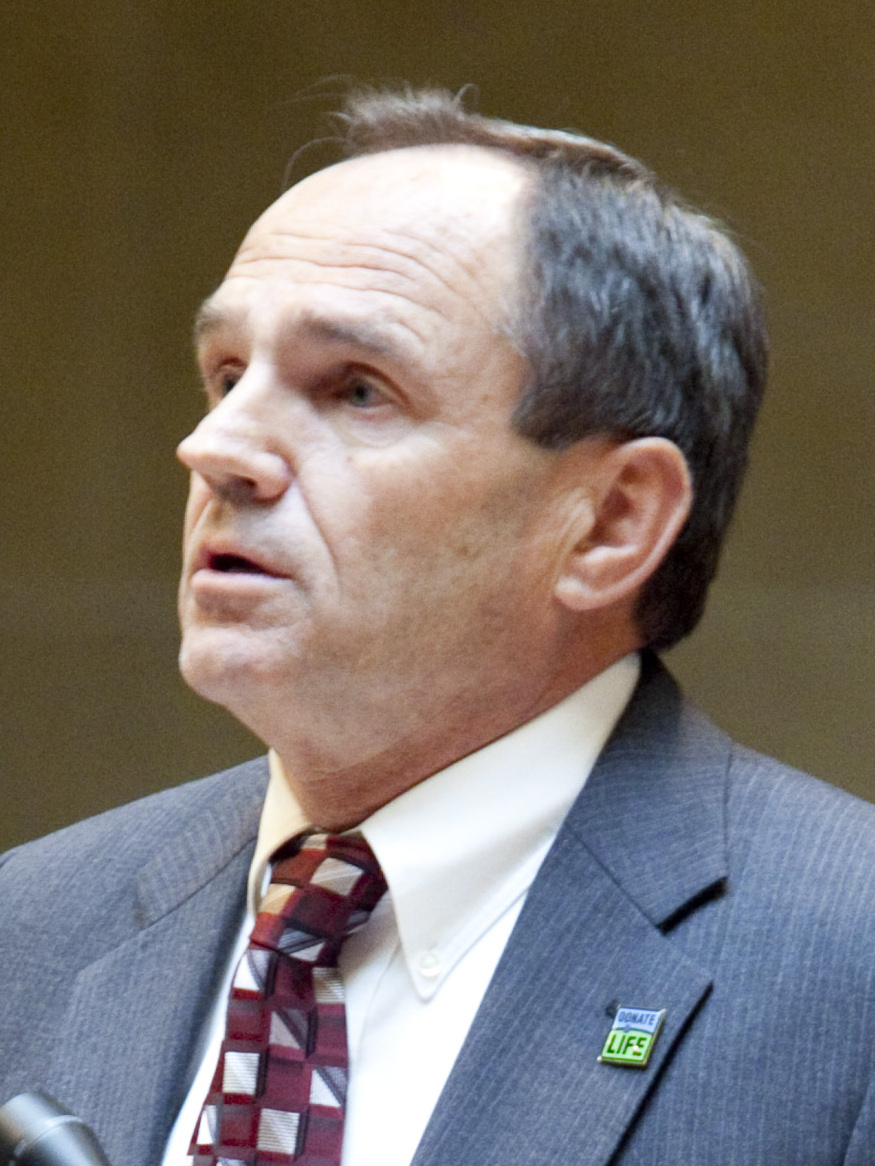
- Kapanke in 2009

Member of the Wisconsin Senate from the 32nd district
- In office January 3, 2005 – August 9, 2011
- Preceded by: Mark Meyer
- Succeeded by: Jennifer Shilling

Personal details
- Born: August 21, 1947 (age 79) La Crosse, Wisconsin, U.S.
- Party: Republican
- Spouse: Ruth
- Education: University of Wisconsin–La Crosse
- Profession: Businessman

Daniel E. Kapanke is an American businessman and politician who was a former Republican member of the Wisconsin Senate, representing the 32nd District from 2005 until losing his seat to Jennifer Shilling in the 2011 Wisconsin Senate recall elections.

== Early life, education and career ==
Kapanke was born in La Crosse, Wisconsin on August 21, 1947. He graduated from Luther High School in Onalaska in 1965. He later graduated from the University of Wisconsin–La Crosse, where he earned a B.S. in 1975 and a M.E.P.D. in Education in 1987. He served in the United States Marine Corps Reserve and in the Wisconsin National Guard. He also served on the Town of Campbell Board. He is the founding owner of the La Crosse Loggers Northwoods League baseball team and was a district sales manager at Kaltenberg Seed Farms for 30 years.

== Wisconsin Senate ==
Kapanke won election to the Wisconsin State Senate twice, first in 2004 against LaCrosse County Board Supervisor Brad Pfaff, and again in 2008 against La Crosse County Supervisor Tara Johnson.

Kapanke served as chair of the Senate Committee on Agriculture, Forestry, and Higher Education, and was also a member of the committees on Energy, Biotechnology, and Consumer Protection, on Financial Institutions and Rural Issues, and on Workforce Development, Small Business, and Tourism. He was also co-chair of the Joint Survey Committee on Retirement Systems.

Kapanke had been criticized for ethics violations, including using $32,000 from a lobbyist-funded charity to pay off personal debt, and violating the state's open records law, causing taxpayers to pay $38,000 in legal bills. According to Kapanke, the violations were unintentional.

=== 2010 U.S. congressional campaign ===
In the summer 2009, Kapanke announced his intention to run for the United States House of Representatives in Wisconsin's 3rd congressional district. His state senate district was largely coextensive with the central portion of the congressional district, including its second-largest city, La Crosse.

In October 2009, Kapanke was added to the National Republican Congressional Committee's Young Guns Program as an "On the Radar" candidate. This designation was only given to ten Republican Congressional candidates in the Midwest. During the same month, Congressional Quarterly readjusted the 3rd Congressional District political status from a "Safe Democratic" to a "Likely Democratic" district.

In September 2010, Kapanke defeated Bruce Evers in the Republican primary, winning approximately 78% of the vote. Kapanke then lost the general election to incumbent Congressman Ron Kind, taking 46 percent of the vote to Kind's 50 percent.

=== 2011 recall ===
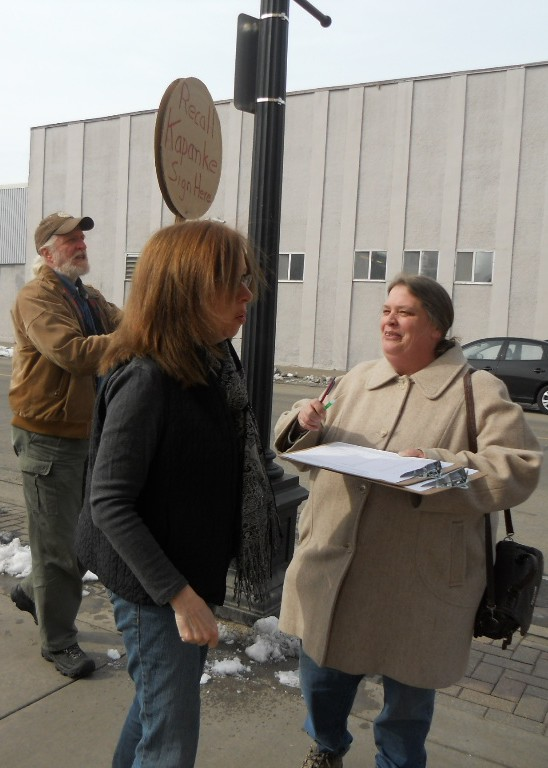
Signatures for the recall petition against Kapanke being collected on March 11, 2011

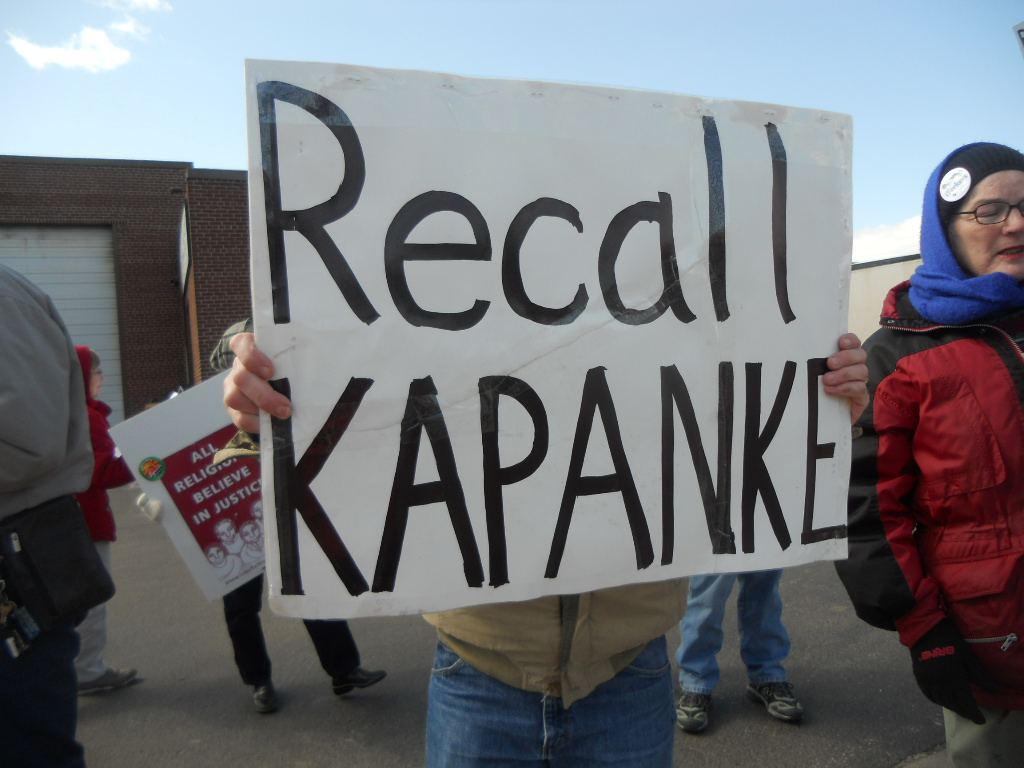
Opponents of Kapanke demonstrating their support for his recall

During the 2011 Wisconsin protests, Kapanke reported that he had received death threats from his vote, and claimed that the windshield of his car had been vandalized, causing him to cancel public appearances. However, a police report had previously concluded that the damage was instead caused by a stray rock. Nevertheless, Kapanke persisted in publicly blaming it on protesters; according to PolitiFact, "Kapanke allowed the myth of the smashed windshield to run wild and uncorrected for almost three weeks after he knew it was not true."

Kapanke was subject to an active recall effort to remove him from his seat in the Wisconsin Senate, as part of the 2011 Wisconsin protests. On March 2, 2011, the "Committee to Recall Kapanke" officially registered with the Wisconsin Government Accountability Board. 15,588 valid signatures of electors residing within the 32nd District had to be collected by May 2, 2011 to generate a recall election.

A March 9, 2011 poll by Survey USA indicated that 57% voters in Kapanke's district would vote for recall.

Kapanke indicated his strong support for Governor Scott Walker, explaining it by asking, "How can you go wrong following a leader that obviously gets his mission on this earth?", referring to their strong religious beliefs. At a separate occasion, he indicated that he did not believe that Walker's plans went far enough, and stated that public safety unions (police, firemen, and state patrol unions) should be included in the collective bargaining ban (under Walker's plan, they are exempt.)

On April 1, 2011, Wisconsin Democrats announced that they had enough signatures to recall Kapanke and filed petitions that day, with 22,561 signatures, 45% more than the 15,588 verifiable signatures required by the Wisconsin Government Accountability Board (GAB).

On April 9, 2011, State Rep. Jennifer Shilling (D - La Crosse) announced her candidacy against Kapanke in a possible recall election.

At a LaCrosse County Republican Party meeting held in late May 2011, party officials discussed the possibility of running an additional Democratic Party candidate against Rep. Shilling, with the intent being to force a primary election against a token opponent, delaying the date of the recall election. According to election clerks, this would cost the state $101,000. At the same meeting, Kapanke expressed concern over his re-election bid due to the large number of public workers in his district, saying that he hoped they would sleep through the election.

==== Kapanke challenges the petition ====
On April 15, 2011, Kapanke filed a challenge with the Government Accountability Board stating that the recall petitions should be thrown out as organizers neglected to file a required registration statement. According to Kapanke's challenge, a specific organizer, Patrick Scheller, is the Recall Petitioner, as he was the one delivering the 22,561 petitions, and thus should have filed the registration himself (which was instead filed by the Recall Committee.) Kapanke also challenged approximately 900 of the 22,561 signatures (15,588 valid signatures are required to force a recall election.)

Pro-recall organizers filed a rebuttal in response, arguing that Kapanke's argument "proceeds from a false factual premise", noting that Scheller was simply a representative of the recall committee, as "a committee can neither be an elector or hold a pen."

==== GAB rules against Kapanke ====
In late May, the Wisconsin Government Accountability Board (GAB) approved the recall petition against Senator Kapanke, rejecting his challenge. The date for the recall election was set for August 9, 2011, following a Democratic primary on July 12, 2011.

==== Recall results ====
Kapanke lost the recall effort to Shilling on August 9, 2011, earning 45% of the vote (26,724) to Shilling's 55% (33,192).

== Electoral history ==
=== Wisconsin Senate (2000–2011) ===
Year	Election	Date	Elected				Defeated				Total	Plurality
2000	Primary	Sep. 12	Dan Kapanke	Republican	7,449	57.42%	Mark Johnsrud	Rep.	3,232	24.92%	12,972	4,217
2000	Primary	Sep. 12	Dan Kapanke	Republican	7,449	57.42%	Ryan Olson	Rep.	922	7.11%	12,972	4,217
2000	Primary	Sep. 12	Dan Kapanke	Republican	7,449	57.42%	John Sarnowski	Rep.	730	5.63%	12,972	4,217
2000	Primary	Sep. 12	Dan Kapanke	Republican	7,449	57.42%	Ray Babb	Rep.	634	4.89%	12,972	4,217
2000	General	Nov. 7	Mark Meyer	Democratic	39,865	50.96%	Dan Kapanke	Rep.	38,248	48.90%	78,223	1,617
2004	General	Nov. 3	Dan Kapanke	Republican	46,416	52.46%	Brad Pfaff	Dem.	41,928	47.39%	88,483	4,488
2008	General	Nov. 4	Dan Kapanke (inc)	Republican	45,154	51.38%	Tara Johnson	Dem.	42,647	48.53%	87,881	2,507
2011	Recall	Aug. 9	Jennifer Shilling	Democratic	33,193	55.38%	Dan Kapanke (inc)	Rep.	26,724	44.58%	59,942	6,469

=== U.S. House of Representatives (2010) ===
Year	Election	Date	Elected				Defeated				Total	Plurality
2010	Primary	Sep. 14	Dan Kapanke	Republican	41,216	76.94%	Bruce F. Evers	Rep.	12,312	22.98%	53,570	28,904
2010	General	Nov. 2	Ron Kind (inc)	Democratic	126,380	50.28%	Dan Kapanke	Rep.	116,838	46.49%	251,340	9,542
2010	General	Nov. 2	Ron Kind (inc)	Democratic	126,380	50.28%	Michael Krsiean	Ind.	8,001	3.18%	251,340	9,542

=== Wisconsin Senate (2016, 2020) ===
Year	Election	Date	Elected				Defeated				Total	Plurality
2016	Primary	Aug. 9	Dan Kapanke	Republican	5,754	90.53%	John Sarnowski	Rep.	601	9.46%	6,356	5,153
2016	General	Nov. 8	Jennifer Shilling (inc)	Democratic	43,585	48.86%	Dan Kapanke	Rep.	43,524	48.79%	89,206	61
2016	General	Nov. 8	Jennifer Shilling (inc)	Democratic	43,585	48.86%	Chip DeNure	Ind.	2,093	2.35%	89,206	61
2020	General	Nov. 3	Brad Pfaff	Democratic	48,877	50.26%	Dan Kapanke	Rep.	48,295	49.67%	97,239	582
