= Campbell, Wisconsin =

- Town
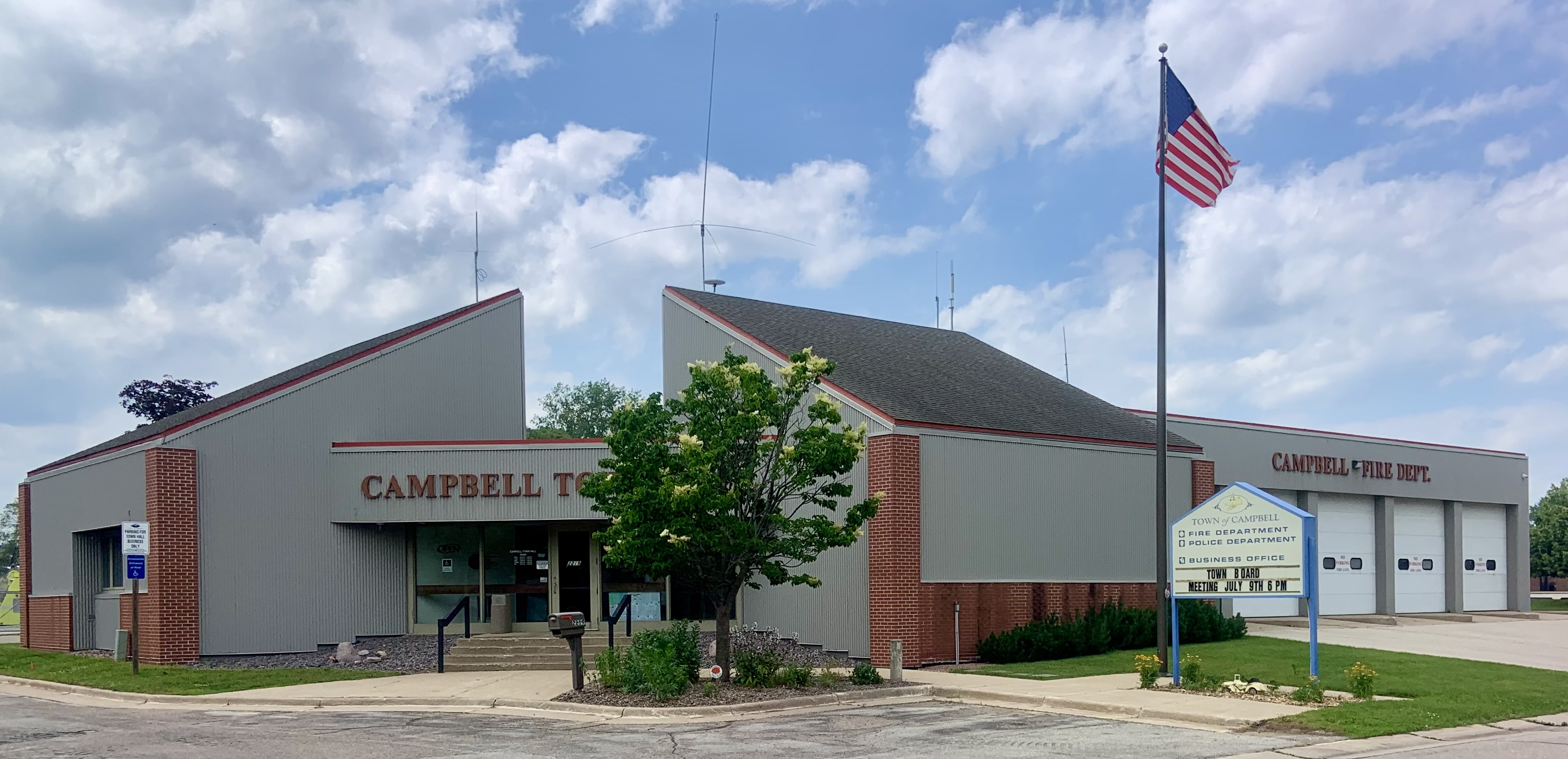
- Town of Campbell Town Hall

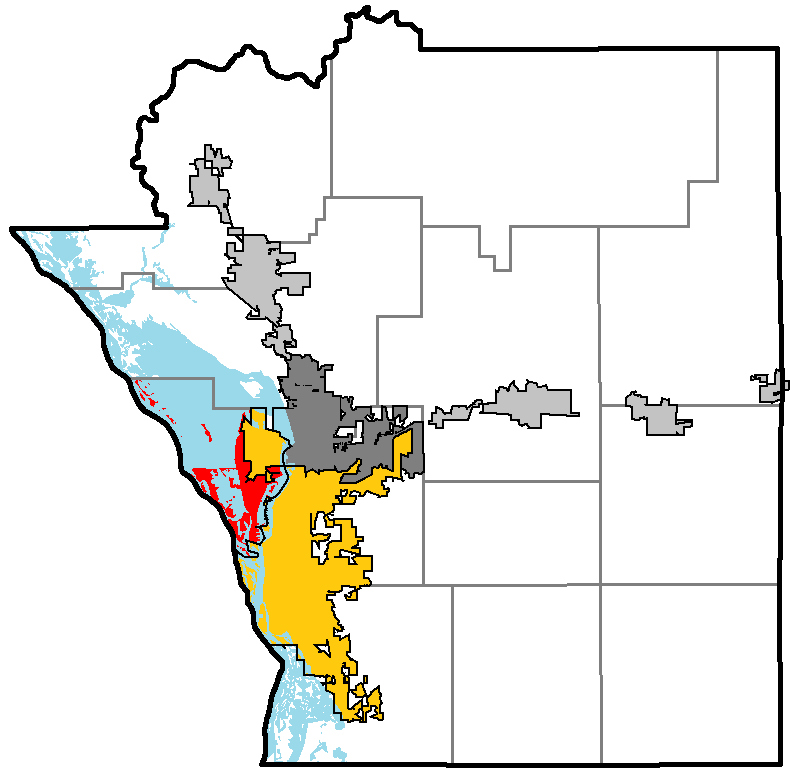
- Location of Campbell, La Crosse County

- Location of La Crosse County, Wisconsin
- Coordinates: 43°51′25″N 91°15′57″W
- Country: United States
- State: Wisconsin
- County: La Crosse

Area
  - Total: 12.6 sq mi (32.6 km^{2})
  - Land: 3.8 sq mi (9.9 km^{2})
  - Water: 8.7 sq mi (22.6 km^{2})
- Elevation: 659 ft (201 m)

Population (2020)
  - Total: 4,284
  - Density: 1,148/sq mi (443.2/km^{2})
- Time zone: UTC-6 (Central (CST))
  - Summer (DST): UTC-5 (CDT)
- Area code: 608
- FIPS code: 55-12300
- GNIS feature ID: 1582912
- Website: https://townofcampbellwi.gov/

Campbell was a township along the Mississippi River in La Crosse County, Wisconsin, United States. It was part of the La Crosse, Wisconsin Metropolitan Statistical Area. The population was 4,284 as of the 2020 Census.

All of the town's population resided in its eastern portion, on the section of French Island denoted French Island CDP by the United States Census Bureau. Some of the island is part of the city of La Crosse. The Town of Campbell bordered the city of La Crosse.

== History ==
The town was originally created in 1851, and was officially named after Erasmus D. Campbell, a former Lieutenant Governor of Wisconsin. Prior to its incorporation as the Village of French Island, the Town of Campbell was confined to part of a large island bordered by the Mississippi and Black rivers and Lake Onalaska. This island has been traditionally known as "French Island." Joseph French, one of the earliest settlers of the town arrived in May 1851. French's family originated from Leicestershire, England. Later, French-Canadian settlers, primarily farmers from the Canadian province of Quebec, settled on the island part of Campbell, then a much larger town between the incorporated settlements of Onalaska and La Crosse.

On October 1, 2025, Campbell submitted a request to incorporate as the Village of French Island.

On May 19, 2026, residents of the Town of Campbell voted in favor of incorporating as the Village of French Island by a margin of 1493 votes for a village and 30 against a village.

On May 21, 2026, the Town of Campbell ceased to exist as its entire land area was incorporated as the Village of French Island.

== Geography ==
According to the United States Census Bureau, the town had a total area of 12.57 square miles (32.556 km^{2}). Of this, 3.84 square miles (9.95 km^{2}) was land and 8.73 square miles (22.6 km^{2}) (69.44%) was water.

== Demographics ==
Historical population
Year	Pop.	±%
1980	4,118	—
1990	4,478	+8.7%
2000	4,410	−1.5%
2010	4,358	−1.2%
2020	4,284	−1.7%

As of the census of 2000, there were 4,410 people, 1,754 households, and 1,266 families residing in the town. The population density was 1,148.0 people per square mile (443.4/km^{2}). There were 1,823 housing units at an average density of 474.5 p|er square mile (183.3/km^{2}). The racial makeup of the town was 96.49% White, 0.52% African American, 0.52% Native American, 1.09% Asian, 0.02% Pacific Islander, 0.27% from other races, and 1.09% from two or more races. Hispanic or Latino of any race were 0.68% of the population.

There were 1,754 households, out of which 31.4% had children under the age of 18 living with them, 60.7% were married couples living together, 7.8% had a female householder with no husband present, and 27.8% were non-families. 21.6% of all households were made up of individuals, and 6.6% had someone living alone who was 65 years of age or older. The average household size was 2.51 and the average family size was 2.93.

In the town, the population was spread out, with 23.8% under the age of 18, 8.4% from 18 to 24, 27.3% from 25 to 44, 28.9% from 45 to 64, and 11.6% who were 65 years of age or older. The median age was 40 years. For every 100 females, there were 101.1 males. For every 100 females age 18 and over, there were 100.2 males.

The median income for a household in the town was $44,736, and the median income for a family was $55,439. Males had a median income of $37,165 versus $25,267 for females. The per capita income for the town was $20,741. About 4.6% of families and 5.1% of the population were below the poverty line, including 8.0% of those under age 18 and 1.5% of those age 65 or over.

== Notable people ==
- Dan Kapanke, businessman and politician
- Ron Kind, lawyer and politician

== Gallery ==
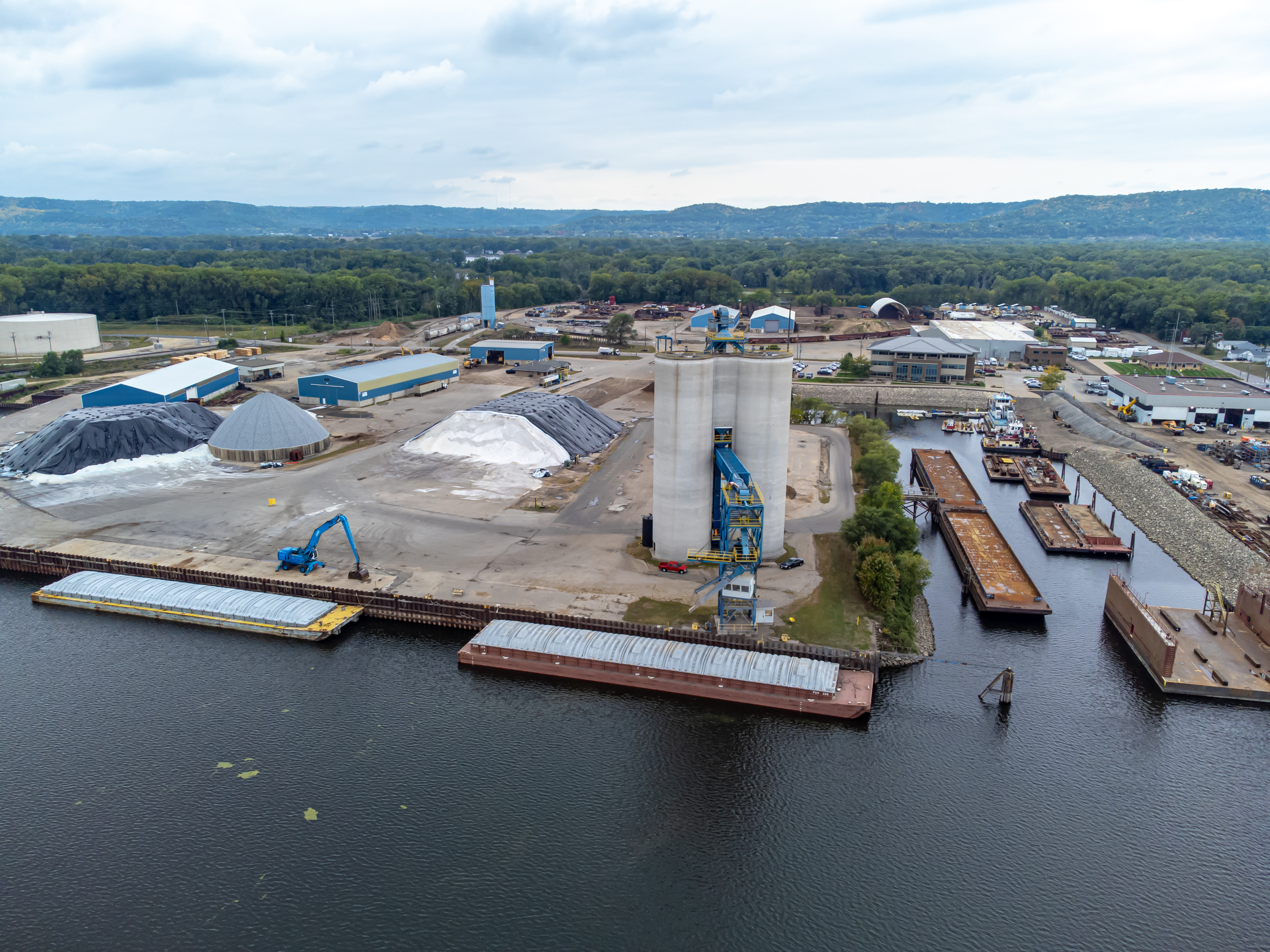
Cargill grain dock

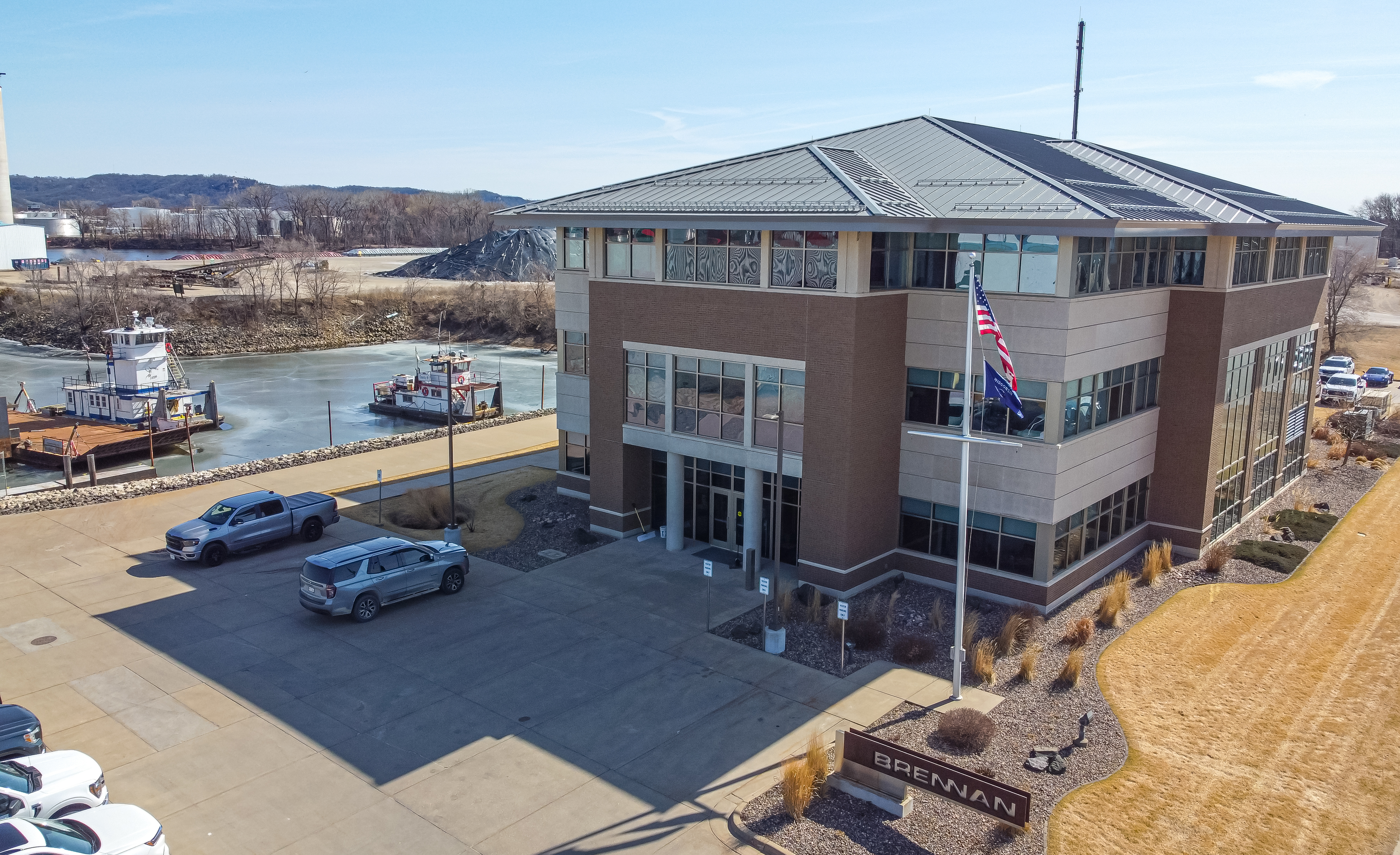
Brennan Marine

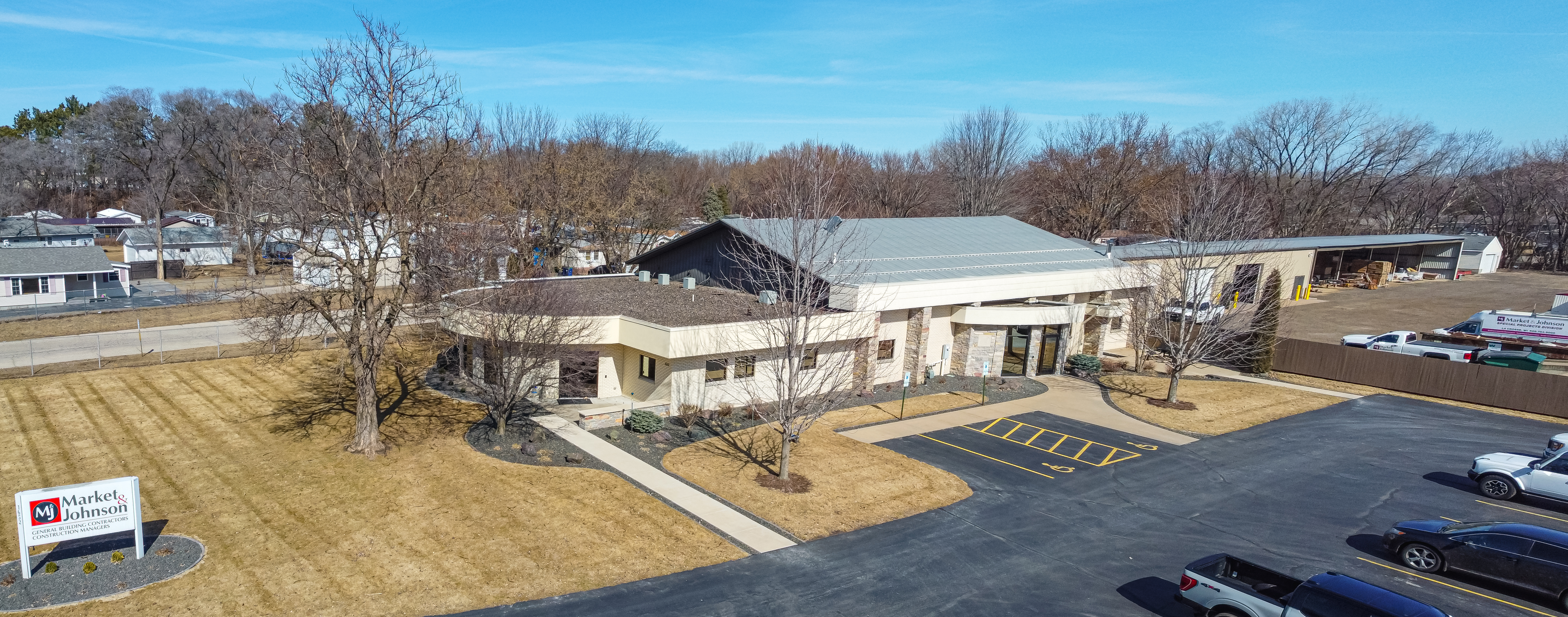
Market and Johnson

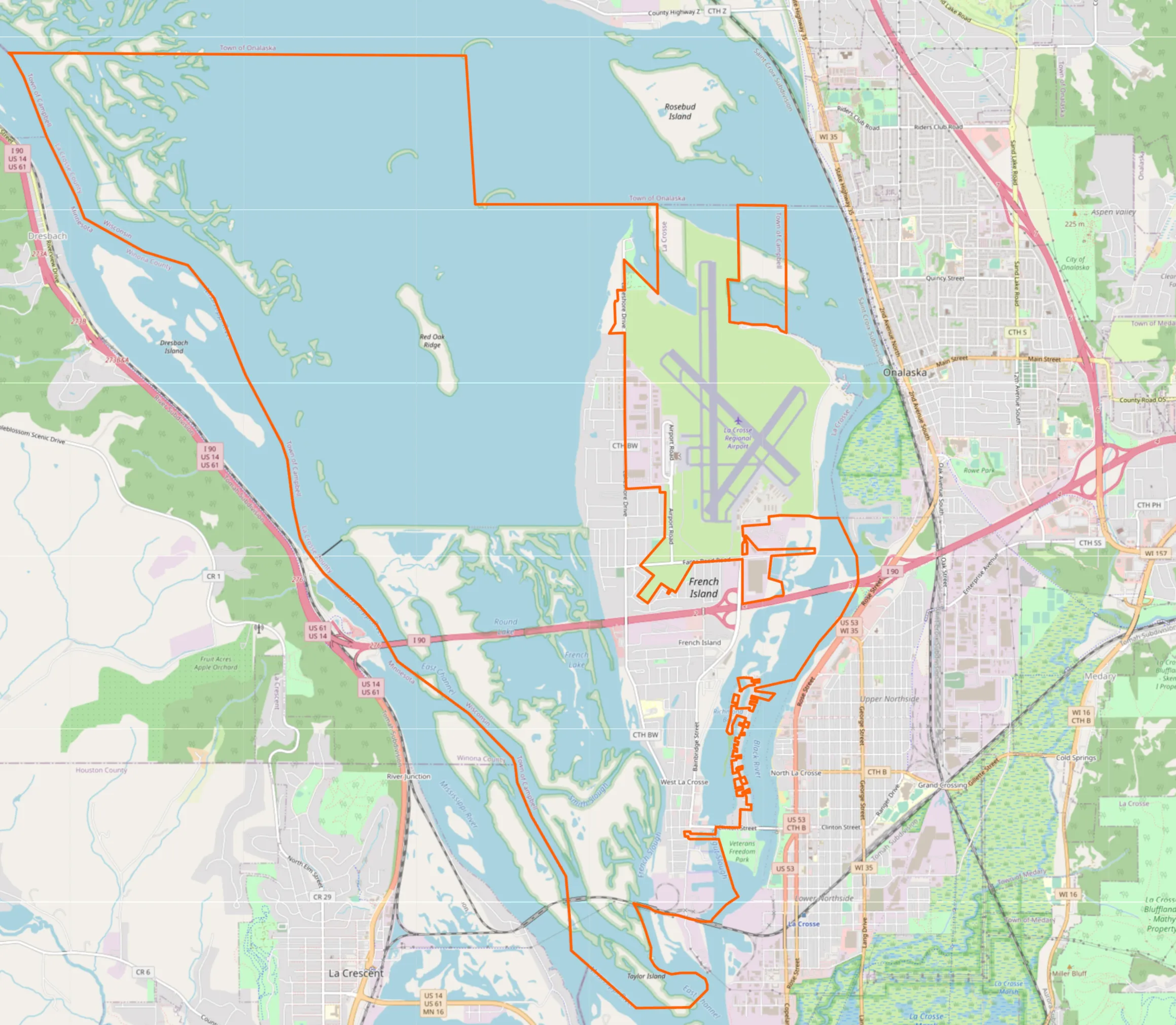
Town of Campbell map
