= Mark F. Miller =

American politician, Wisconsin State Senator

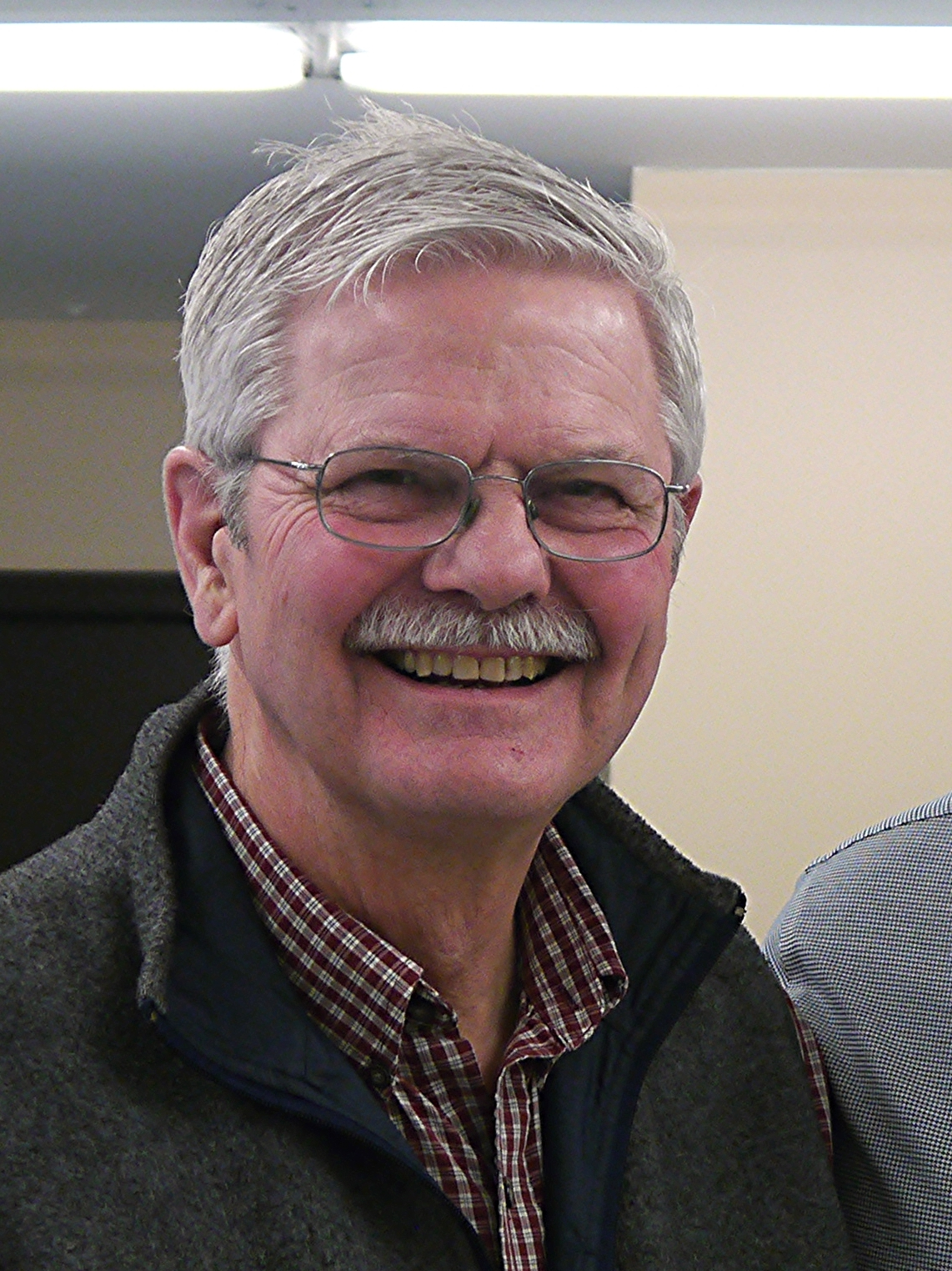
- Miller in 2014

Majority Leader of the Wisconsin Senate
- In office July 17, 2012 – January 7, 2013
- Preceded by: Scott L. Fitzgerald
- Succeeded by: Scott L. Fitzgerald

Minority Leader of the Wisconsin Senate
- In office January 12, 2011 – March 17, 2012
- Preceded by: Scott L. Fitzgerald
- Succeeded by: Scott L. Fitzgerald

Member of the Wisconsin Senate from the 16th district
- In office January 3, 2005 – January 4, 2021
- Preceded by: Charles Chvala
- Succeeded by: Melissa Agard

Member of the Wisconsin State Assembly from the 48th district
- In office January 4, 1999 – January 3, 2005
- Preceded by: Doris Hanson
- Succeeded by: Joe Parisi

Personal details
- Born: February 1, 1943 (age 83) Boston, Massachusetts, U.S.
- Party: Democratic
- Spouse: Jo Oyama-Miller
- Children: 3
- Parents: Edward Ernst Miller (father); Mary E. (Scoon) Miller (mother)
- Relatives: Midge Miller (stepmother)
- Education: University of Wisconsin–Madison
- Website: Senate website

Military service
- Allegiance: United States
- Branch/service: United States Air Force; Wis. National Guard
- Years of service: 1966-1995
- Rank: Lt. Colonel, ANG

Mark F. Miller (born February 1, 1943) is a retired American politician. A Democrat, he served 16 years in the Wisconsin Senate (2005–2021) and was majority leader in 2012. He also served 6 years in the Wisconsin State Assembly.

== Early life and family ==
Mark Miller was born in Boston, Massachusetts, in 1943, but moved to Wisconsin as a child and graduated from Middleton High School in Middleton. His father, Ed Miller, worked as a professor at the University of Wisconsin. His mother died in 1961, and, in 1963, Miller's father married Marjorie Leeper, who would later become well known in Wisconsin politics as Midge Miller. Midge became a significant activist in Wisconsin, running the Wisconsin presidential primary campaign of U.S. Senator Eugene McCarthy in 1968, and serving 14 years in the Wisconsin State Assembly. Mark Miller later credited his stepmother's example as important in his decision to go into public service.

Miller joined the Wisconsin Air National Guard in 1966 and became an aircraft pilot, he remained in the Guard until 1995. He married second-generation Japanese American Jo Oyama in 1968, just after the Supreme Court case of Loving v. Virginia struck down prohibitions against interracial marriage. Wisconsin never had a law prohibiting interracial marriage, but the couple lived for a time in Alabama, where Miller had been stationed with the Air National Guard. Miller referred to this experience as formative in discussing his perspective on marriage equality in the context of Wisconsin amending its Constitution to ban same-sex marriages in 2006. Miller and Jo have three children and reside in Monona, Wisconsin.

Miller obtained his Bachelor's degree in 1973, at age 30, from the University of Wisconsin–Madison. He worked in real estate and entered politics in 1996, when he was elected to the Dane County Board of Supervisors.

== Political career ==
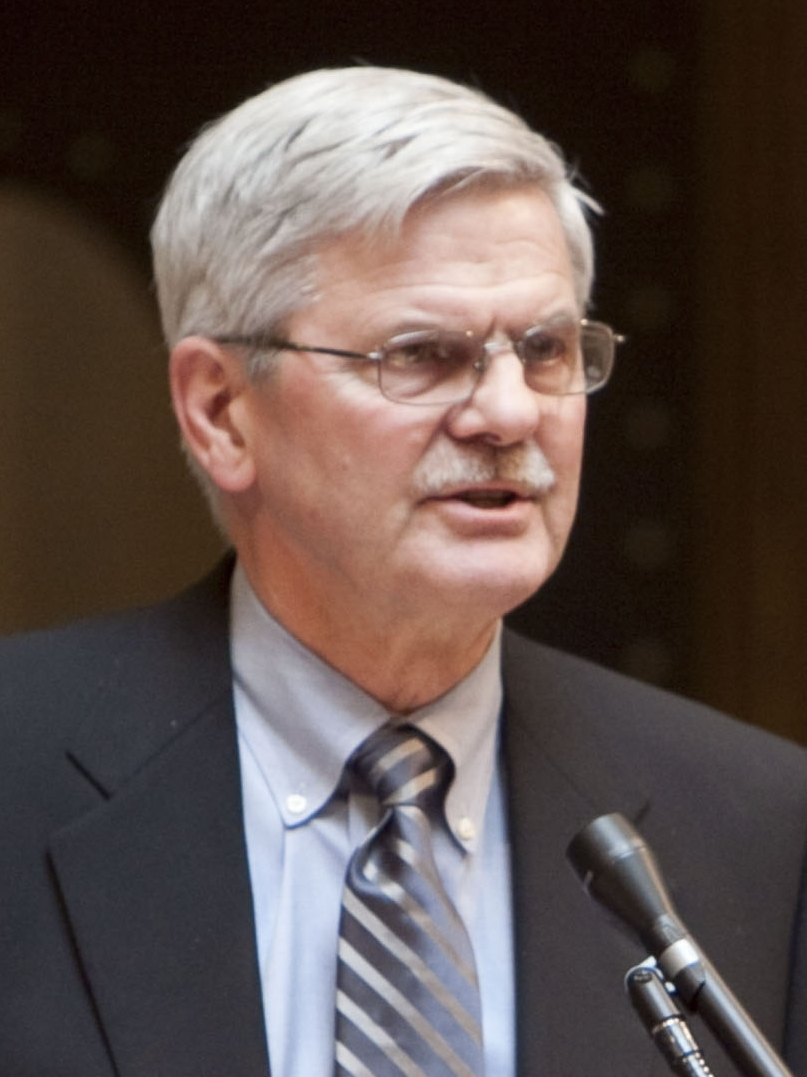
Miller in 2009

In 1998, Miller ran for Wisconsin State Assembly in a crowded Democratic primary to replace Doris Hanson, who had resigned to take a new job in the state government. Miller prevailed in the primary over Monona attorney Helen Marks Dicks, Madison city budget analyst Dan Bohrod, and Madison activist Barbara Pennington. In the general election, he faced Republican Madison consultant Kevin Miller, and won 68% of the vote in the Democrat-friendly district. Miller was re-elected in his Assembly seat in 2000 and 2002, and continued his education during this time, attending the Bowhay Institute for Legislative Leadership Development and the Flemming Fellows Leadership Institute.

In 2004 he seized an opportunity to run for the Wisconsin State Senate in the 16th district, where incumbent Charles Chvala was facing criminal indictment. Miller faced fellow-Assemblymember Tom Hebl in the Democratic primary and prevailed with about 58% of the vote.

Miller rose through the ranks in the Democratic caucus and was chosen as caucus chairman when the Democrats took the majority in 2007. Later that year, he became co-chair of the powerful Joint Finance Committee.

=== 2011 Wisconsin protests ===
The 2010 elections gave Republicans full control of state government with Scott Walker as Governor and new majorities in the Legislature. Miller was chosen as the new leader for Senate Democrats in the minority, and expressed interest in working with the new majority to advance the business of the state. However, Governor Walker's Budget Repair Bill—ending collective bargaining rights for public employee unions—was seen as so radical that it provoked massive protests at the State Capitol. As Republicans signaled their intent to quickly pass the legislation despite the protests, Miller fled the state with the 13 other Democratic State Senators, to deny the Senate a quorum. As the bill was nonetheless being passed during the evening hours of March 9, 2011, Miller commented acidly, "In 30 minutes, 18 senators undid 50 years of civil rights".

A series of recall elections followed the Budget Repair Bill controversy, as Democrats were targeted for leaving the state and Republicans were targeted for the legislation itself. Miller was one of the senators subject to a recall movement. Organizers of the recall came within 268 votes of recalling him and had the option of merging their signatures with those collected by the Utah-based group American Patriot Recall Coalition in order to meet the minimum number of signatures required. However, the group decided not to do so because they claimed "the APRC is a front group for either wrecking conservative causes or for simple money making."

=== Joint Senate Leader ===
Other recalls were more successful, and following the removal of two Republican senators in the 2011 recall elections and the resignation of Republican Senator Pam Galloway, the two parties were each left with 16 seats in the senate. A joint leadership then emerged with Miller, as the leader of the Democrats in the Senate, and Scott L. Fitzgerald, the leader of the Republicans in the Senate, as co-leaders. Democrats claimed the majority in July 2012 after a third Republican senator was defeated in a recall election, but as Republicans had already passed new redistricting legislation which locked in a majority through gerrymandering, the Democrats recall gains were wiped away in the 2012 general election. Miller stood down as leader after the election and supported the election of first term Milwaukee Senator Chris Larson as the Democrats' leader for the 2013-2014 session.

=== Retirement ===
In January 2020, Senator Miller announced he would not seek re-election to a fifth term in the Senate. He left office in January 2021.

== Electoral history ==
=== Wisconsin Assembly (1998, 2000, 2002) ===
Wisconsin Assembly, 48th District Election, 1998
Party	Candidate	Votes	%	±%
Primary Election, September 8, 1998
Democratic	Mark F. Miller	3,024	30.08%	
Republican	Kevin Miller	2,547	25.34%	
Democratic	Helen Marks Dicks	2,352	23.40%	
Democratic	Dan Bohrod	1,715	17.06%	
Democratic	Barbara Pennington	414	4.12%	
Total votes		10,052	100.0%	
General Election, November 3, 1998
Democratic	Mark F. Miller	13,498	68.44%	
Republican	Kevin Miller	6,224	31.56%	
Total votes		19,722	100.0%	
Democratic hold				

=== Wisconsin Senate (2004, 2008, 2012, 2016) ===
Wisconsin Senate, 16th District Election, 2004
Party	Candidate	Votes	%	±%
Primary Election, September 14, 2004
Republican	Eric P. Peterson	9,267	38.54%	
Democratic	Mark F. Miller	8,582	35.69%	
Democratic	Tom Hebl	6,170	25.66%	
	Scattering	26	0.11%	
Total votes		24,045	100.0%	
General Election, November 3, 2004
Democratic	Mark F. Miller	58,147	60.04%	
Republican	Eric P. Peterson	38,643	39.90%	
	Scattering	51	0.05%	
Plurality		19,504	20.14%	
Total votes		96,841	100.0%	
Democratic hold				

Wisconsin State Assembly
Preceded by Doris Hanson	Member of the Wisconsin State Assembly from the 48th district January 4, 1999 – January 3, 2005	Succeeded by Joe Parisi
Wisconsin Senate
Preceded by Charles Chvala	Member of the Wisconsin Senate from the 16th district 2005 – 2021	Succeeded by Melissa Agard
Preceded by Scott L. Fitzgerald	Minority Leader of the Wisconsin Senate; 2011 – 2012	Succeeded by Scott L. Fitzgerald
Preceded by Scott L. Fitzgerald	Majority Leader of the Wisconsin Senate; 2012 – 2013	Succeeded by Scott L. Fitzgerald
