= 2011 Wisconsin Senate recall elections =

- July 19, 2011 – August 16, 2011

9 of the 33 seats in the Wisconsin State Senate 17 seats needed for a majority
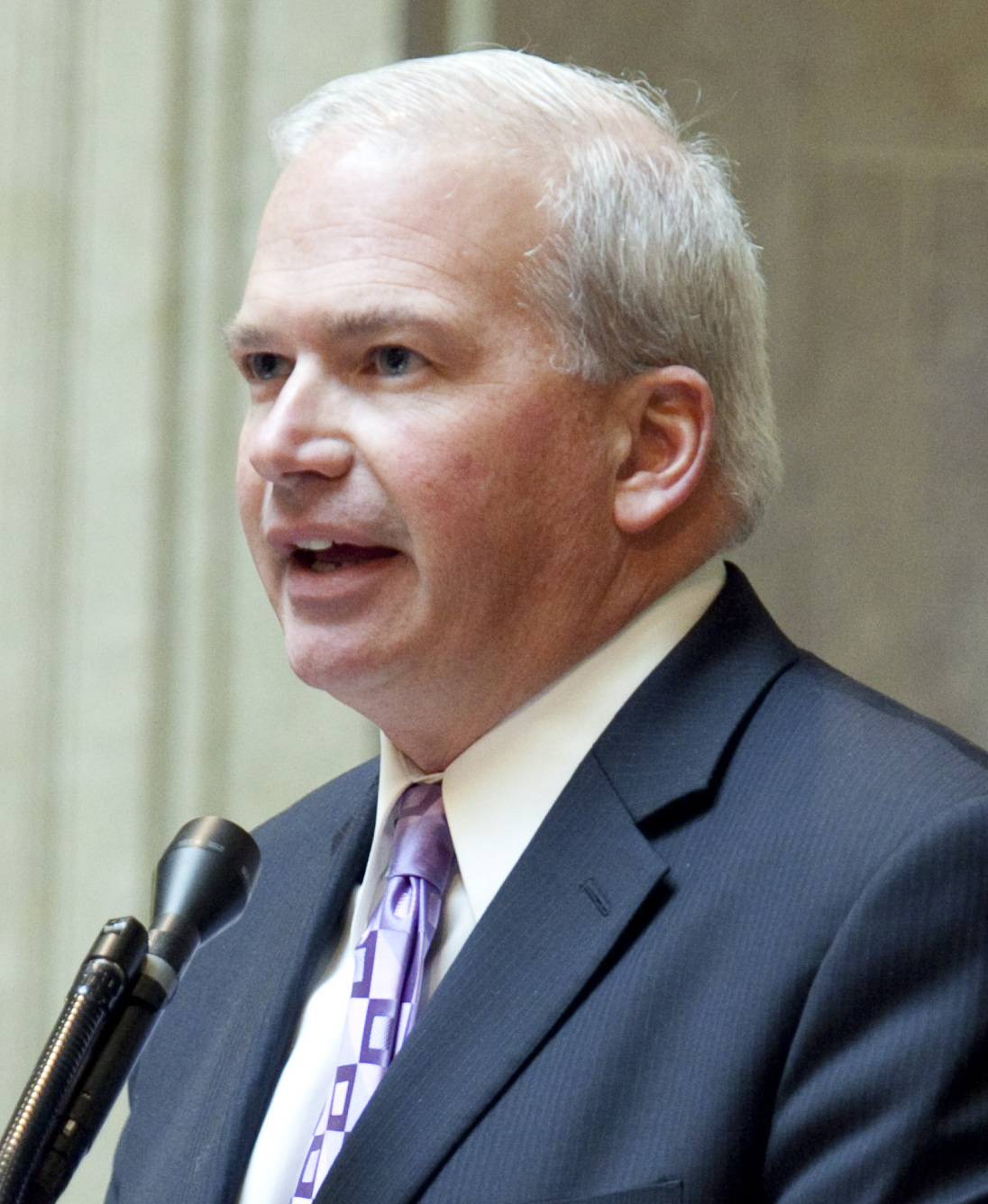

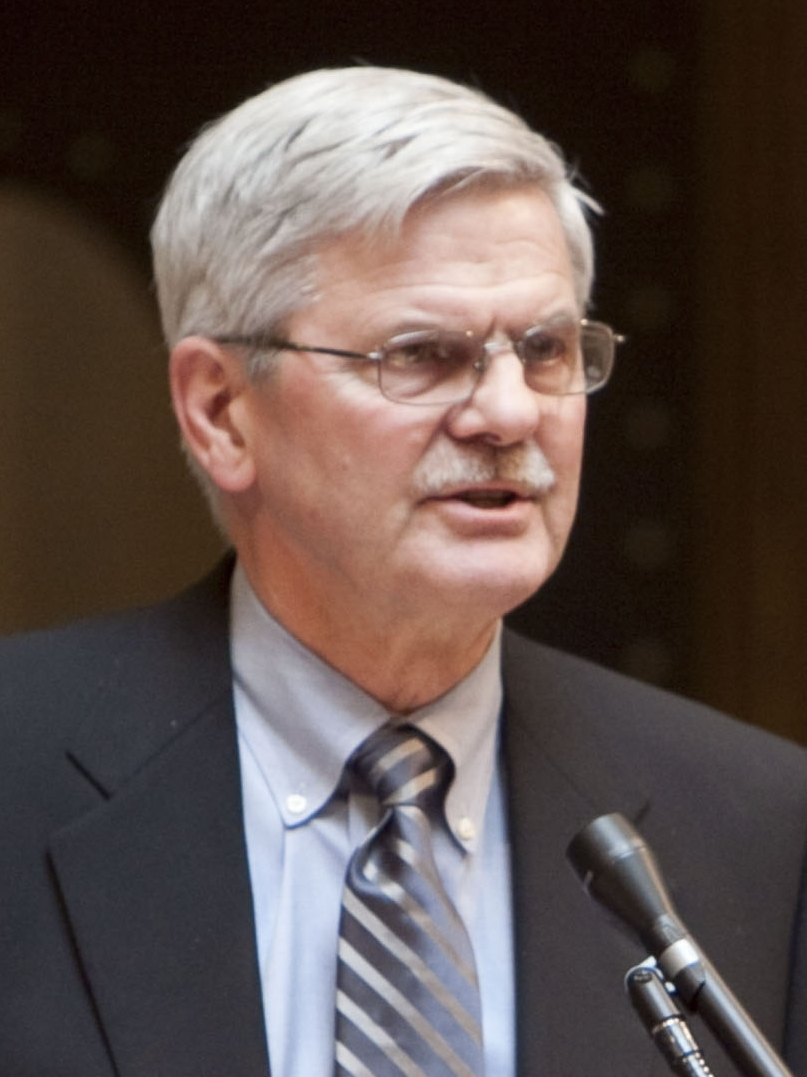
	Majority party	Minority party
Leader	Scott Fitzgerald	Mark Miller
Party	Republican	Democratic
Leader since	January 1, 2007	January 12, 2011
Leader's seat	13th–Juneau	16th–Monona
Last election	11 seats, 59.11%	6 seats, 40.54%
Seats before	19	14
Seats won	4	5
Seats after	17	16
Seat change	▼2	▲2
Popular vote	239,351	245,962
Percentage	49.3%	50.7%
- Republican hold Democratic gain Democratic hold No election 50–60% 50–60% 60–70%
President before election
Michael Ellis
Republican
Elected President
Michael Ellis
Republican

The 2011 Wisconsin Senate recall elections were a series of recall elections for nine Wisconsin state senators held on July 19, 2011, August 9, 2011, and August 16, 2011. Nine of the 33 seats in the Wisconsin Senate were up for election—all even-numbered districts. were held during the summer of 2011; one was held on July 19, and six on August 9, with two more held on August 16. Before the elections, six seats were held by Republicans, while three were held by Democrats. The primary election was held in July.

== Background ==
=== Act 10 ===
In the 2010 elections, Republicans won a trifecta for the first time since 1994. Using this newly-gained trifecta, Republicans began enacting a series of highly controversial pieces of legislation, with the chief among them being Wisconsin Act 10. Act 10, also known as the "Budget Repair Bill," sought to eliminate the collective bargaining rights of certain public-sector unions–with exemptions for certain public safety unions such as police, fire fighters, and sheriffs deputies being established. Supporters of the law claimed that the law would help balance the state's budget. The law also made it more difficult to certify and maintain a public employee union and made it more difficult for unions to collect dues from their members.

The law sparked strong backlash from public employees, especially teachers and students, who staged protests of the legislation across the state.

=== Legislative walkout ===
To prevent passage of the bill, all 14 Democratic members of the Wisconsin State Senate left the state of Wisconsin and traveled to Illinois in order to delay a vote on the bill and deprive the chamber of a quorum to prevent the passage of the bill. Republicans managed to pass the bill anyway the next month, but the fallout from the bill's passage led to the attempted recall of governor Scott Walker and the successful recall of multiple members of the Senate in 2011 and 2012.

Due to concerns that Republicans had been attempting to pass the Budget Repair bill without scheduling enough time for public review and debate, Senate Minority Leader Mark Miller led the entire Senate Democratic caucus in fleeing the state to prevent the quorum necessary for a vote on the bill.

Voters attempted to put 16 state senators up for recall, eight Democrats and eight Republicans, because of the budget bill proposed by Governor Scott Walker and circumstances surrounding it. Republicans targeted Democrats for leaving the state for three weeks to prevent the bill from receiving a vote, while Democrats targeted Republicans for voting to significantly limit public employee collective bargaining. Scholars could cite only three times in American history when more than one state legislator has been recalled at roughly the same time over the same issue.

The Wisconsin Government Accountability Board (GAB) certified six recall petitions filed against Republican senators and three recall petitions filed against Democratic senators. Democrats needed a net gain of three seats to take control of the Senate. Republicans needed a net gain of one seat to gain a quorum-proof supermajority on fiscal spending. Of the nine recall elections, Democrats retained all three of their challenged seats; Republicans saw two of their six challenged seats recalled thus they retained their majority in and control of the State Senate, albeit by a slightly narrower margin.

More than $35 million was spent on the recall races. The spending on the nine races compares to $19.3 million spent in 2010's 115 legislative races, and approached the $37.4 million spent in the race for governor.

== Campaign ==
=== Recall petitions ===
Dist.	Incumbent			Recall petition		
Dist.	Member	Party	First elected	Signatures required	Signatures approved (%)	Status
02	Robert Cowles	Rep.	1987 (special)	15,960	23,959 (150%)	Recall held on August 9.
08	Alberta Darling	Rep.	1990	20,343	22,243 (109%)	Recall held on August 9.
10	Sheila Harsdorf	Rep.	2000	15,744	23,685 (150%)	Recall held on August 9.
12	Jim Holperin	Dem.	2008	15,960	19,255 (121%)	Recall held on August 16.
14	Luther Olsen	Rep.	2004	14,733	22,207 (150%)	Recall held on August 9.
18	Randy Hopper	Rep.	2008	15,269	22,953 (150%)	Recall held on August 9.
20	Glenn Grothman	Rep.	2004	20,061	15,000 (75%)	Petition failed, Recall not held
22	Robert Wirch	Dem.	1996	13,537	17,138 (127%)	Recall held on August 16.
28	Mary Lazich	Rep.	1998 (special)	20,973	18,000 (85%)	Petition failed, Recall not held
30	Dave Hansen	Dem.	2000	13,852	15,540 (112%)	Recall held on July 19.
32	Dan Kapanke	Rep.	2004	15,588	21,776 (140%)	Recall held on August 9.

=== 'Placeholder' candidates ===
In all six Democratic-led recall attempts against Republican Senators, the Republican Party organized and supported the nominations of 'placeholder' candidates in the Democratic primaries (called "Fake Democrats" by some). According to the Republican Party of Wisconsin, the purpose of the placeholder candidates was to force Democratic primaries and delay the general election, allowing their incumbent Senators to have additional time to campaign. Robocalls were sent out to 20,000 conservative voters for candidate Isaac Weix in an effort to get Republicans to cross over and vote in the primary. All the placeholder candidates were defeated.

The cost to the state was estimated to be more than $475,000.

=== Recall controversies ===
Later that month, Americans for Prosperity, a conservative group, began sending absentee ballots to Democratic voters in all districts undergoing recall elections, with instructions to return the ballots to the city clerk before August 11 even though the recall election itself is being held August 9 in those districts. In addition, the voters were instructed to return the ballots to what was claimed to be "the absentee ballot processing center", but was actually a mailing address for conservative group Wisconsin Family Action.

On July 29, the Government Accountability Board criticized a Republican-allied voter ID advocacy group We're Watching Wisconsin Elections, for publishing reference guides for election observers that featured "numerous significant and factual errors." For example, the reference guides stated that student voters using their college ID must present "a tuition receipt with their name and address on it dated within the last 9 months". Wisconsin voter ID law does not actually require such a receipt.

=== Aftermath ===
The first general recall election also took place in that month, with Democratic Senator Dave Hansen retaining his seat. Six general elections took place on August 9 resulting in four Republican senators retaining their seats and two being defeated with Republicans keeping a majority in the Wisconsin Senate. Two Democratic incumbents (Wirch, Holperin) prevailed in their own recall races on August 16, which left Republicans with a net one-vote majority in the Wisconsin Senate.

== Results Summary ==
=== Close results ===
Seats where the margin of victory was under 10%:

1. State Senate district 18, 2.27% (gain)
2. State Senate district 14, 4.31%
3. State Senate district 8, 7.31%

== Race summary ==
Dist.	Incumbent			This race	
Dist.	Member	Party	First elected	Status	General
02	Robert Cowles	Republican	1987 (special)	Incumbent retained	▌ ✓ Robert Cowles (Rep.) 57.44%; ▌Nancy J. Nusbaum (Dem.) 42.43%
08	Alberta Darling	Republican	1992	Incumbent retained	▌ ✓ Alberta Darling (Rep.) 53.62%; ▌Sandy Pasch (Dem.) 46.31%
10	Sheila Harsdorf	Republican	2000	Incumbent retained	▌ ✓ Sheila Harsdorf (Rep.) 57.60%; ▌Shelly Moore (Dem.) 42.32%
12	Jim Holperin	Democratic	2008	Incumbent retained	▌ ✓ Jim Holperin (Dem.) 55.12%; ▌Kim Simac (Rep.) 44.68%
14	Luther Olsen	Republican	2004	Incumbent retained	▌ ✓ Luther Olsen (Rep.) 52.10%; ▌Fred Clark (Dem.) 47.79%
18	Randy Hopper	Republican	2008	Incumbent recalled. New member elected. Democratic gain.	▌ ✓ Jessica King (Dem.) 51.10%; ▌Randy Hopper (Rep.) 48.83%
22	Robert Wirch	Democratic	1996	Incumbent retained	▌ ✓ Robert Wirch (Dem.) 57.35%; ▌Jonathan Steitz (Rep.) 42.51%; ▌Brian Hardwood (Ind.; write-in) 0.05%
30	Dave Hansen	Democratic	2000	Incumbent retained	▌ ✓ Dave Hansen (Dem.) 65.93%; ▌David VanderLeest (Rep.) 33.05%
32	Dan Kapanke	Republican	2004	Incumbent recalled. New member elected. Democratic gain.	▌ ✓ Jennifer Shilling (Dem.) 55.38%; ▌Dan Kapanke (Rep.) 44.58%

== Detailed results ==
=== District 2 ===
Incumbent Republican Robert Cowles ran for re-election. He defeated Democrat Nancy Nusbaum and was retained in office.

=== District 8 ===
Incumbent Republican Alberta Darling ran for re-election. She defeated Democrat Sandy Pasch and was retained in office.

On August 1, the Republican Party of Wisconsin filed a complaint with the Government Accountability Board accusing Sandy Pasch's campaign of possible collusion with the group Citizen Action of Wisconsin, of which Pasch is a member of the board of directors. Pasch claimed she had had no contact with anyone at Citizen Action regarding any political activities. Gillian Morris, a spokeswoman for the Democratic Party of Wisconsin, and Robert Kraig, executive director of Citizen Action both stated that there was no coordination whatsoever between Pasch in the recall election, and Citizen Action.

=== District 10 ===
Incumbent Republican Sheila Harsdorf ran for re-election. She defeated Democrat Shelly Moore and was retained in office.

=== District 12 ===
Incumbent Democrat Jim Holperin ran for re-election. He defeated Republican Kim Simac and was retained in office

=== District 14 ===
Incumbent Republican Luther Olsen ran for re-election. He defeated Democratic state representative Fred Clark by a four-point margin and was retained in office

=== District 18 ===
Incumbent Republican Randy Hopper ran for re-election. He was defeated by Democratic Oshkosh deputy mayor Jessica King by a three-point margin and recalled from office.

=== District 22 ===
Incumbent Democrat Robert Wirch ran for re-election. He defeated Republican Jonathan Steitz by a 15-point margin and was retained in office.

=== District 30 ===
Incumbent Democrat Dave Hansen ran for re-election. He defeated Republican recall organizer David VanderLeest by a wide margin and was retained in office

Initially, Republican state representative John Nygren ran to face Hansen in the recall. At the end of the filing period he had filed 424 qualifying voter signatures, but during the signature challenge period, 39 signatures were challenged as not being from the 30th district, and 26 signatures were ruled to be invalid. As a result of Nygren's disqualification, VanderLeest was the only Republican candidate to face Hansen. After being disqualified from the ballot, Nygren filed a lawsuit in Dane County Court seeking to overturn the board's decision, but was unsuccessful.

=== District 32 ===
Incumbent Republican Dan Kapanke ran for re-election. He was defeated by Democratic state representative Jennifer Shilling by a 10-point margin and recalled from office.

== See also ==
- 2011 Wisconsin Act 10
- 2011 Wisconsin protests
- 2011 Wisconsin elections
  - 2011 Wisconsin Supreme Court election
