= Mark Meyer (politician) =

American politician and legislator

Mark Meyer (born September 3, 1963) is an American Democratic politician in Wisconsin.

Born in La Crosse, Wisconsin, Meyer graduated from University of Wisconsin–La Crosse and served on the La Crosse Common Council. Meyer served in the Wisconsin State Assembly 1993–2001. In 2001, he served in the Wisconsin State Senate until 2004. In 2004, Governor Jim Doyle appointed Meyer as commissioner of the Public Service Commission of Wisconsin to replace Ave Bie. He served a full 6-year term until he was replaced by Phil Montgomery in 2010.
