= Pauline Redmond Coggs =

- Pauline Redmond, from a 1935 magazine
- Born: 1912; Paris, Kentucky, US
- Died: July 17, 2005
- Occupation: Social worker

Pauline Redmond Coggs (1912 – July 17, 2005) was an American social worker, educator, and civil rights activist. She focused on combating unemployment, civil rights violations, poverty, and racism, as well as supporting communities of color, women, and other marginalized factions within the United States. Coggs began as a community organizer in Chicago, then served as a race relations adviser within the Office of Civilian Defense before assuming a position at the Washington DC Urban League. Her activism focused

The Pauline Redmond Coggs Foundation was launched in 1999 with the goal of serving African Americans through educational and family programs. The institution aimed to educate and financially empower African Americans through affording them skills and tools that were deprived of in traditional society.

== Early life ==
Coggs was born in 1912 in Paris, Kentucky, the third of four children, to father Rev. John B. Redmond and mother Josephine B. Redmond. Her father John Redmond was a prominent Methodist minister and educator, while mother Josephine was a teacher. Both John and Josephine hailed from the then segregated state of Mississippi. In her early life, Coggs was greatly influenced by her father's extensive involvement in community issues and her mother's emphasis on self-betterment. Coggs graduated from secondary school in Chicago and went on to further her studies at the University of Chicago, where she was awarded a bachelor's degree in Sociology and Psychology. While at the university, Coggs was selected for a fellowship to attend the University of Pittsburgh, where she attained a master's degree in Social Work. Eventually, all four of the Redmond children went on to actively participate in the civil rights movement, focusing on economic, social, and political issues that plagued their upbringing.

== Career ==
During her career Coggs focused on social work and social reform. She took a job as the Director of Youth Activities within the Chicago Urban League, where she adopted her strategy of community based, grassroots empowerment. In 1941, Coggs assumed employment at the Office of Civilian Defense, where she was appointed a race relations adviser. In conjunction with her work, Coggs was subsequently appointed in 1943 to a senior leadership position as Executive Director at the Washington DC Urban League, becoming the first African American woman to head the organization. During her tenure, Coggs was met with the opportunity to meet with the First Lady Eleanor Roosevelt; the two shared similar visions with regard to addressing human rights and liberties, and formed a close friendship.

During the same year, Coggs began work as a part-time professor at Howard University in Washington, D.C., working there until 1944. During this time, Coggs also authored Race Relations Advisers-Messiahs or Quislings, a book on the racial dynamics of society. After her tenure at Howard, Coggs taught in the Sociology department at the University of Wisconsin in Madison.

In the late 1940s, Coggs moved to Milwaukee, following her husband's graduation from law school. There, she was employed as a social worker by the Milwaukee Public School System and worked to obtain tenure as a professor at the University of Wisconsin Extension School of Social Welfare. Shortly after relocating to Milwaukee, Coggs was appointed to the state's Commission on Human Rights. Coggs was named the Assistant Executive Secretary of the Wisconsin Welfare Council from 1947 to 1948, where she assumed responsibilities of distributing vital resources to impoverished residents. During her time in Milwaukee, Coggs actively advocated for addressing the issues faced by young Black men and women. As a result, in 1959, Coggs was handpicked by the mayor of Milwaukee to study the nature of discrimination faced by black people in light of a shootout between a young black man and a Milwaukee police officer.

== Legacy ==
For her work, Coggs has been described as a trailblazer for racial advancement and equality and for her commitment to social reform.

=== Pauline Redmond Coggs Foundation ===
In honor of Cogg's achievements, her sorority Alpha Kappa Alpha sorority Incorporated, Epsilon Kappa Omega chapter established the Pauline Redmond Coggs Foundation in 1999 to provide charitable, educational and community services. Coggs served as the first president of that chapter. The foundation provides scholarships and establishes educational programs, with a focus on economically empowering and providing leadership development opportunities for those in disadvantaged communities. Other areas of focus include health, arts and the black family. The foundation hosts an Annual Debutante Cotillion for young women hailing from Milwaukee Public Schools and surrounding districts to celebrate their achievements. Debutantes are awarded scholarships based on their fundraising efforts and successful completion of the program. As of 2018, more than 800 young women have participated and been awarded over $800,000 in scholarships.

== Personal life ==
In 1942, Coggs married Theodore Washington Coggs, who is a graduate of Howard University. After Cogg's husband returned from World War II, the couple relocated to Madison, Wisconsin, where her husband earned a law degree at the University of Wisconsin in Madison. Coggs remained active in the public sphere after her husband's death in 1968. Through her marriage to Theodore Coggs, she is related to political leaders that included Senator Spencer Coggs, Marcia Coggs, Isaac Coggs and Milwaukee County Supervisor Elizabeth Coggs-Jones. In 2001, she suffered a series of strokes and died 4 years later on July 17, 2005, at the age of 93.
