= Coggs =

Coggs is a surname. Notable people with the surname include:

- Elizabeth M. Coggs (born 1956), American politician
- Granville C. Coggs (1925–2019), U.S. medical doctor, pilot with the Tuskegee Airmen
- Isaac N. Coggs (1920–1973), American politician
- Marcia P. Coggs (1928–2003), American politician
- Spencer Coggs (born 1949), American public administrator and politician
