= Darrin Madison =

21st century American politician

Member of the Wisconsin State Assembly from the 10th district
- Incumbent
- Assumed office January 3, 2023
- Preceded by: David Bowen

Personal details
- Born: February 1, 1997 (age 29) Milwaukee, Wisconsin, U.S.
- Party: Democratic
- Other political affiliations: Democratic Socialists of America
- Education: Howard University

Darrin Brian Madison Jr. (born February 1, 1997) is an American justice activist and Democratic politician from Milwaukee, Wisconsin. He is a member of the Wisconsin State Assembly, representing Wisconsin's 10th Assembly district since January 2023.

== Biography ==
Darrin Madison Jr. was born and raised in Milwaukee, Wisconsin. At a young age, he was introduced to activism through the "Young Scientist" program at Milwaukee's Urban Ecology Center. At age 14, he participated in the mass protests against 2011 Wisconsin Act 10—the Budget Repair Bill which abolished collective bargaining rights for public employees. Later that year, he joined Urban Underground, a youth-led social justice organization in Milwaukee. Through his teenage years, he worked on social justice campaigns fighting for youth jobs, education, public safety, sexual health, and environmental justice.

He graduated from Ronald Wilson Reagan College Preparatory High School in 2015 and went on to study at Howard University. While in Washington, D.C., he worked on political campaigns in Maryland, D.C., and Alaska. After attending Howard, Madison returned to Milwaukee as an AmeriCorps Public Allies volunteer, returning to the Urban Ecology Center and working with Milwaukee's Environmental Collaboration Office.

== Political career ==
In the 2020 general election, incumbent Milwaukee County Board of Supervisors member Supreme Moore Omokunde was elected to the Wisconsin State Assembly and therefore had to vacate his county board seat. A special election was called for the following spring election, and Madison was one of five candidates vying for the seat. Madison came in second in the nonpartisan primary and faced Priscilla Coggs-Jones in the general election. He ultimately fell just 12 votes short of Coggs-Jones in the April 2021 general election.

Later that year, Wisconsin State Assembly incumbent David Bowen announced he would run for Lieutenant Governor of Wisconsin rather than seek another term representing the 10th Assembly district. Madison entered the race for the Democratic Party nomination and defeated Glendale mayor Bryan Kennedy in the primary. Madison faced no opponent in the general election in the overwhelmingly Democratic district.

== Electoral history ==
=== Milwaukee County Board (2021) ===
Milwaukee County Board of Supervisors, 10th District Election, 2021
Party	Candidate	Votes	%	±%
Nonpartisan Primary, February 23, 2021
Nonpartisan	Priscilla E. Coggs-Jones	725	42.32%	
Nonpartisan	Darrin B. Madison Jr.	475	27.73%	
Nonpartisan	Danielle McClendon	193	11.27%	
Nonpartisan	Aleyah Anderson	165	9.63%	
Nonpartisan	James M. Ferguson II	146	8.52%	
	Scattering	9	0.53%	
Total votes		1,713	100.0%	
General Election, April 6, 2021
Nonpartisan	Priscilla E. Coggs-Jones	1,545	50.02%	
Nonpartisan	Darrin B. Madison Jr.	1,533	49.63%	
	Scattering	11	0.36%	
Plurality		12	0.39%	
Total votes		3,089	100.0%	

=== Wisconsin State Assembly (2022–present) ===
Year	Election	Date	Elected				Defeated				Total	Plurality
2022	Primary	Aug. 9	Darrin Madison	Democratic	5,069	58.20%	Bryan L. Kennedy	Dem.	3,621	41.57%	8,710	1,448
2022	General	Nov. 8	Darrin Madison	Democratic	20,730	98.79%	--Unopposed--				20,984	20,476
2024	General	Nov. 5	Darrin Madison (inc)	Democratic	24,882	98.65%	--Unopposed--				25,222	24,542

Wisconsin State Assembly
Preceded by David Bowen	Member of the Wisconsin State Assembly from the 10th district January 3, 2023 – present	Incumbent
