= Sheldon Wasserman =

American politician (born 1961)

Sheldon Wasserman M.D.

Member of the Milwaukee County Board of Supervisors from the 3rd district
- Incumbent
- Assumed office April 2016
- Preceded by: Gerry P. Broderick

Member of the Wisconsin State Assembly from the 22nd district
- In office January 2, 1995 – January 5, 2009
- Preceded by: Polly W. Beal
- Succeeded by: Sandy Pasch

Personal details
- Born: August 5, 1961 (age 65) Milwaukee, Wisconsin, U.S.
- Party: Democratic
- Spouse: Wendy Jill Wolfman (m. 1987)
- Children: 3
- Education: University of Wisconsin–Milwaukee (B.S.); Medical College of Wisconsin (M.D.)
- Profession: Physician, obstetrician
- Website: Campaign website Official website

Sheldon Allen Wasserman (born August 5, 1961) is an American physician and Democratic politician from Milwaukee, Wisconsin. He served 14 years as a member of the Wisconsin State Assembly, representing Wisconsin's 22nd Assembly district from 1995 to 2009. He is now a member of the Milwaukee County Board of Supervisors, representing Milwaukee's east side and lakefront since 2016.

== Biography ==
Sheldon Wasserman was born in August 1961, in Milwaukee, Wisconsin. He was raised and educated in Milwaukee, graduating from John Marshall High School in 1979. He attended the University of Wisconsin–Milwaukee, earning his bachelor's degree in 1983. He immediately continued his education at the Medical College of Wisconsin, completing his doctorate in 1987. He moved to Cincinnati, Ohio, where he performed his medical residency in obstetrics and gynaecology at Bethesda Oak Hospital.

After completing his residency, Wasserman returned to Milwaukee and was employed as an obstetrician at Northpoint Medical Clinic.

== Political career ==
In 1994, Wasserman made his first run for elected office, running for Wisconsin State Assembly. He ran as a Democrat, challenging first term incumbent Republican Polly W. Beal in the 22nd Assembly district. The 22nd district at the time comprised a small part of the northeast part of the city of Milwaukee and all of Milwaukee's northern lakeshore suburbs in northeast Milwaukee County. Nationally, the 1994 election was a Republican wave; Wasserman prevailed in his race by just 488 votes and was the only Democrat to unseat an incumbent Republican in Wisconsin that year.

Wasserman was re-elected six times, serving in the Assembly through 2008.

In 2008, rather than running for re-election, Wasserman ran for Wisconsin Senate, challenging incumbent Republican state senator Alberta Darling in the 8th Senate district. The 8th Senate district then comprised the northern quarter of Milwaukee County along with parts of southern Ozaukee County, northeast Waukesha County, and southeast Washington County. 2008 was a Democratic wave election, but Wasserman fell short in his race, finishing 1,007 votes behind Darling.

After leaving office in 2009, Wasserman was appointed to the state Medical Examining Board by governor Jim Doyle. Three years later, he was elected chairman of the board.

In 2016, after eight years out of politics, Wasserman announced he would run for office again. He ran for the open 3rd district seat on the Milwaukee County Board of Supervisors, and was elected without opposition. He is now in his fifth term.

== Personal life and family ==
Sheldon Wasserman is the eldest of three children of Yale and Merle (née Weiss) Wasserman. His father, Yale, worked as a dental surgeon.

Sheldon Wasserman married Wendy Jill Wolfman of Milwaukee in 1987. They met in Milwaukee but at the time were both living and working in Cincinnati; she was a speech pathologist at the Cincinnati Public Schools. They have three adult children and reside in Milwaukee.

== Electoral history ==
=== Wisconsin Assembly (1994–2006) ===
Year	Election	Date	Elected				Defeated				Total	Plurality
1994	General	Nov. 8	Sheldon A. Wasserman	Democratic	11,140	51.12%	Polly W. Beal (inc)	Rep.	10,652	48.88%	21,792	488
1996	General	Nov. 5	Sheldon A. Wasserman (inc)	Democratic	15,314	57.06%	Polly W. Beal	Rep.	11,526	42.94%	26,840	3,788
1998	General	Nov. 3	Sheldon A. Wasserman (inc)	Democratic	15,562	71.08%	David Tatarowicz	Rep.	6,332	28.92%	21,894	9,230
2000	General	Nov. 7	Sheldon A. Wasserman (inc)	Democratic	18,266	63.42%	Kevin Gerard	Rep.	10,510	36.49%	28,800	7,756
2002	General	Nov. 5	Sheldon A. Wasserman (inc)	Democratic	16,822	98.56%	--unopposed--				17,068	
2004	General	Nov. 2	Sheldon A. Wasserman (inc)	Democratic	21,750	65.36%	R. Jay Hintze	Rep.	11,495	34.54%	33,278	10,255
2006	General	Nov. 7	Sheldon A. Wasserman (inc)	Democratic	20,571	98.70%	--unopposed--				20,843	

=== Wisconsin Senate (2008) ===
Year	Election	Date	Elected				Defeated				Total	Plurality
2008	General	Nov. 4	Alberta Darling (inc)	Republican	50,125	50.46%	Sheldon A. Wasserman	Dem.	49,118	49.45%	99,328	1,007

Wisconsin State Assembly
Preceded by Polly W. Beal	Member of the Wisconsin State Assembly from the 22nd district January 2, 1995 – January 5, 2009	Succeeded by Sandy Pasch
