= David Bowen (Wisconsin politician) =

21st century American politician

Member of the Wisconsin State Assembly from the 10th district
- In office January 5, 2015 – January 2, 2023
- Preceded by: Sandy Pasch
- Succeeded by: Darrin Madison

Personal details
- Born: January 28, 1987 (age 39) Milwaukee, Wisconsin, U.S.
- Party: Democratic
- Education: University of Wisconsin–Milwaukee
- Website: Official website

David Bowen (born January 28, 1987) is an American politician from Milwaukee, Wisconsin. He was a member of the Wisconsin State Assembly, representing the 10th Assembly district from 2015 through 2022. He previously served on the Milwaukee County Board of Supervisors.

== Early life and education ==
Bowen was born in Milwaukee, the son of Jamaican immigrants. He graduated with honors from Bradley Tech High School in 2005. He participated in the youth leadership program of the Milwaukee non-profit organization Urban Underground and the Americorps program, Public Allies. He volunteered with Urban Underground while attending the University of Wisconsin–Milwaukee, studying community engagement and education. He earned his B.S. in community engagement and educational policy from UW-M.

While at UW-M, Bowen became program director at Urban Underground, served on the Medical College of Wisconsin's Violence Prevention Initiative Steering Committee and the City of Milwaukee's Homicide Review Commission.

== Career ==
In April 2012 he was elected to the County Board for District 10, at which time he was the youngest member of that board and one of the youngest black elected officials in the history of the Milwaukee metropolitan area. He was the lead author of a living wage bill requiring all companies doing business with Milwaukee County to be paid $11.32 an hour. County Executive Chris Abele's veto of the ordinance was over-ridden.

In 2014, when Democratic incumbent Sandy Pasch announced that she would not seek re-election, Bowen was one of four candidates seeking the Democratic nomination for Wisconsin State Assembly in the 10th Assembly district. Bowen received a majority of the votes in the August 2014 Democratic primary, and was unopposed in the general election. He was subsequently re-elected in 2016, 2018, and 2020, without facing an opponent.

In 2022, Bowen ran (unsuccessfully dropping out early) for the Democratic nomination for Lieutenant Governor of Wisconsin; fellow Democrat Darrin Madison was elected to succeed him in the Assembly. In 2023, he ran for an open seat on the Milwaukee Common Council, but fell 17 votes short of his opponent.

As of 2025, Bowen is leading Wisconsin Voices, a voter-engagement nonprofit.

== Politics ==
Bowen attended the 2016 Democratic National Convention as a superdelegate, and pledged his support to Bernie Sanders. Bowen was a superdelegate by virtue of his role as vice chair of the Democratic Party of Wisconsin.

In 2019, he ran for chairman of the Democratic Party of Wisconsin, but was defeated by Ben Wikler.

Wisconsin State Assembly
Preceded by Sandy Pasch	Member of the Wisconsin State Assembly from the 10th district January 5, 2015 – January 2, 2023	Succeeded by Darrin Madison
