= LaTonya Johnson (politician) =

American activist and politician

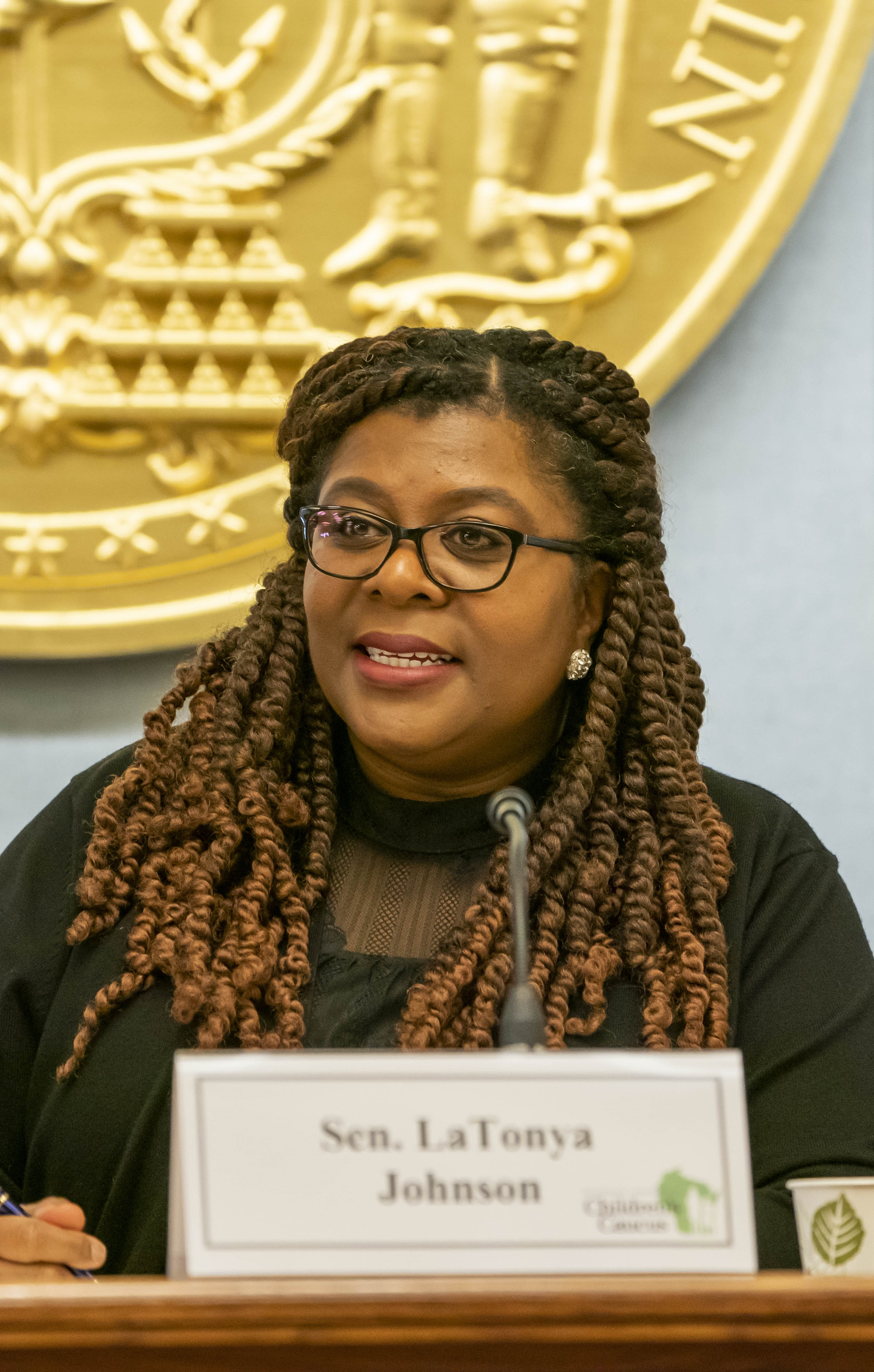
- Johnson in 2020

Member of the Wisconsin Senate from the 6th district
- Incumbent
- Assumed office January 3, 2017
- Preceded by: Nikiya Harris Dodd

Member of the Wisconsin State Assembly from the 17th district
- In office January 1, 2013 – January 3, 2017
- Preceded by: Barbara Toles
- Succeeded by: David Crowley

Personal details
- Born: June 22, 1972 (age 54) Somerville, Tennessee, U.S.
- Party: Democratic
- Children: 1
- Education: University of Wisconsin, Milwaukee; Tennessee State University (BS)
- Occupation: Politician, union president, business owner
- Website: Official website

LaTonya Johnson (born June 22, 1972) is an American activist and Democratic politician from Milwaukee, Wisconsin. She is a member of the Wisconsin Senate, representing the 6th Senate district since 2017. Before her election to the Senate, she served two terms in the Wisconsin State Assembly, and was president of AFSCME Local 502.

== Early life and career ==
Johnson was born June 22, 1972 in Somerville, Tennessee. During her teenage years she attended Graduate Bay View high school, graduating in 1990. After graduating high school Johnson attended the University of Wisconsin–Milwaukee from 1990 until 1992. In 1997, she enrolled in Tennessee State University, where she earned a B.S. degree in criminal justice, and has lived in Milwaukee for over thirty years. She owned and operated Anointed Child Care Service, an in-home daycare service, and served as president of Local 502 of AFSCME, the union which represents in-home daycare providers in Milwaukee County.

== Political career ==
=== Assembly ===
When Barbara Toles resigned from her Assembly District 17 seat, Johnson was one of four candidates who vied for the Democratic nomination in this recently redistricted inner city district. She achieved an easy plurality, with 43% of the vote, in a field which included a former Milwaukee Area Technical College Board member with UAW ties, and an aide to State Representative Elizabeth Coggs.

When Barbara Toles announced her retirement from the state assembly, Johnson was one of four candidates who attempted to seek the Democratic nomination. During the primary she faced Fred Royal, legislative aide to Elizabeth M. Coggs Tracey Dent, who was backed by the pro-school choice American Federation for Children, and Sam Coleman.

In the general election, she defeated Independent and banker, Anthony Edwards, by a wide margin.

=== Senate ===
In November 2016, Johnson was elected to the Wisconsin State Senate. She had easily defeated two opponents, local government lobbyist Thomas Harris and Milwaukee School Board member Michael Bonds, in the August Democratic primary, and was unopposed in the general election.

In 2020, Johnson faced a primary challenge from Michelle Bryant, the chief of staff to fellow senator Lena Taylor. During the campaign, the two ran on a broadly similar record, but the primary difference was on the topic of Mandatory minimum sentencing. In 2015 Johnson sponsored legislation when she was a member of the state assembly to establish mandatory minimums for violent offenders caught with firearms, Bryant on the other hand ran in the primary opposing that legislation and criticizing Johnson for advocating for such minimums. In the primary election, Johnson defeated Bryant by a large margin. Following the primary, Johnson criticized Lena Taylor for what she argued was a toxic climate created by her in the legislature as well as a series of incidents spanning back to 2013 when Johnson was first elected. Johnson was re-elected in the general election, defeating Republican Alciro Deacon by a wide margin.

In 2021 Johnson and state representative Shelia Stubbs unveiled the "Birth Equity Act" which was a set of six pieces of legislation which would provide post-delivery home wellness visits, designate pregnancy a qualifying event for employer-sponsored health plans, remove the sales tax on breastfeeding supplies and expand access to dental care for pregnant women who receive BadgerCare.

In April 2022, 10-year-old Lily Peters from Chippewa Falls, Wisconsin, went missing, triggering a search that ended in tragedy when her body was found. Despite the urgency of the situation, Lily's case did not meet the strict criteria for an Amber Alert, leaving her family and community feeling helpless and prompting a public outcry for change. Advocacy efforts, including a petition that received over 196,000 signatures, called for an expansion of the alert criteria to better protect children. The campaign, targeted at Senator Jesse James, did not result in legislation during the 2021-22 Legislative Session.

In October 2023, the case of 5-year-old Prince McCree from Milwaukee, Wisconsin, brought national attention to the limitations of the existing Amber Alert system. Prince went missing while at home, and despite efforts from his family and the Milwaukee Police Department to issue an Amber Alert, the request was denied due to the lack of information on a suspect. Tragically, Prince was found dead the following day, leading to a renewal in advocacy for a more inclusive alert system for missing children.

In response to disappearance of McCree, State Senator LaTonya Johnson collaborated with State Senator Jesse James to introduce the Protection and Recovery Involving Non-located Children Endangered (PRINCE) Act. Named in honor of Prince McCree, the PRINCE Act modifies the missing adult at risk criteria, currently used for the Silver Alert system, to include children under 10, or children under 18 who have a physical or mental disability that would prevent them from returning home safely. This legislation, which passed both the Wisconsin Senate and Assembly in February 2024, aims to ensure that every missing child receives immediate and widespread attention.

After the PRINCE Act passed the Assembly unanimously, Senator Johnson released a statement saying "The passage of this bill fulfills my promise to the families of Prince McCree and Lily Peters, and to the families of missing children around the state. I am deeply moved and grateful for the bipartisan support that the PRINCE Act received, and I look forward to seeing Governor Evers sign this bill into law."

During a debate in the state senate on the next state budget, Johnson criticized Republican policies she claimed contributed to crime in Milwaukee, including inaction on gun control. She provided an anecdote about how she had lost count of the number of funerals she had attended due to gun violence. Johnson accused Republicans of only taking action when crime affected their suburban communities. At the end of her speech, she stated "What about [the moms of children in the city], who had to say goodbye to their kids forever, because of their zip code? Fuck the suburbs, because they don't know a goddamn thing about life in the city." This comment received national attention, and Steve Schuster, head of the Wisconsin Law Journal, called for Johnson to resign over her comments. Others, such as Dan Schafer, came to her defense. Later, Johnson apologized for her comments, saying "Although I stand by the context of my speech, I could have used a different choice of words on the Senate floor. I apologize for using those specific words."

In 2024, Johnson was re-elected unopposed.

== Personal life ==
Johnson has one daughter, Sydney.

== Electoral history ==
=== Wisconsin Assembly (2012, 2014) ===
Year	Election	Date	Elected				Defeated				Total	Plurality
2012	Primary	Aug. 14	La Tonya Johnson	Democratic	2,054	42.98%	Fred Royal	Dem.	1,093	22.87%	4,779	961
2012	Primary	Aug. 14	La Tonya Johnson	Democratic	2,054	42.98%	Tracey Dent	Dem.	1,072	22.43%	4,779	961
2012	Primary	Aug. 14	La Tonya Johnson	Democratic	2,054	42.98%	Sam Coleman	Dem.	548	11.47%	4,779	961
2012	General	Nov. 6	La Tonya Johnson	Democratic	20,288	84.73%	Anthony R. Edwards	Ind.	3,573	14.92%	23,943	8,338
2012	General	Nov. 6	La Tonya Johnson	Democratic	20,288	84.73%	Virginia Pratt (write-in)	Rep.	6	0.03%	23,943	8,338
2014	General	Nov. 4	La Tonya Johnson (inc)	Democratic	19,666	87.25%	Eugenie M. Stackowitz	Ind.	2,802	12.43%	22,541	16864

=== Wisconsin Senate (2016–present) ===
Year	Election	Date	Elected				Defeated				Total	Plurality
2016	Primary	Aug. 9	La Tonya Johnson	Democratic	9,583	60.61%	Thomas Harris	Dem.	3,166	20.03%	15,810	6,417
2016	Primary	Aug. 9	La Tonya Johnson	Democratic	9,583	60.61%	Michael Bonds	Dem.	3,022	19.11%	15,810	6,417
2016	General	Nov. 8	La Tonya Johnson	Democratic	60,129	98.89%	--Unopposed--				60,805	59,453
2020	Primary	Aug. 11	La Tonya Johnson (inc)	Democratic	14,462	80.39%	Michelle Bryant	Dem.	3,515	19.54%	17,989	10,947
2020	General	Nov. 3	La Tonya Johnson (inc)	Democratic	60,057	88.51%	Alciro Deacon	Rep.	7,555	11.13%	67,855	52,502
2020	General	Nov. 3	La Tonya Johnson (inc)	Democratic	60,057	88.51%	Michelle Bryant (write-in)	Ind.	142	0.15%	67,855	52,502
2024	General	Nov. 5	La Tonya Johnson (inc)	Democratic	69,190	98.51%	--Unopposed--				70,233	68,147
