= Irene Trowell-Harris =

United States Air Force general

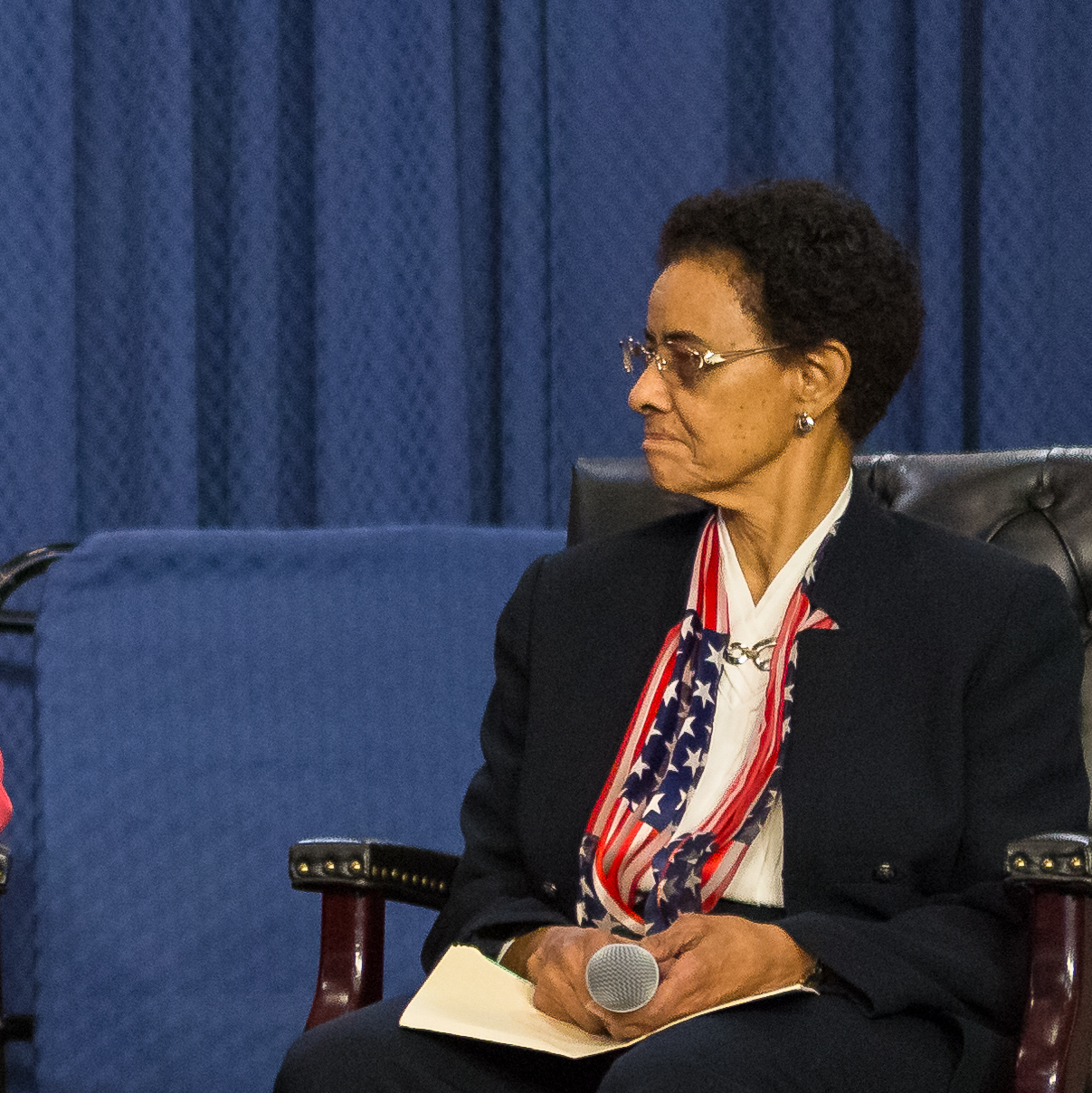
- Born: September 20, 1939 (age 86); Aiken, South Carolina, U.S.
- Occupations: nurse and major general
- Known for: first African American major general in the US National Guard

Irene Trowell-Harris (born September 20, 1939) is a retired American major general in the US National Guard. She was the first African American woman to achieve that rank.

== Life ==
Trowell-Harris was born in Aiken in South Carolina, where her family were cotton farmers and she would pick cotton like the other 12 members of her family. She was able to become a nurse as her community and church found the money to send her to Columbia College of Nursing. In April 1963, the New York Air National Guard made her a first lieutenant and the following year she joined the Flight nurse branch of the Aerospace School of Medicine in San Antonio, Texas. She became a flight nurse in February 1964 donning the silver flight wings that fulfilled a ten year old ambition to fly.

She went on to take a master's degree at Yale University in 1973 and a doctorate in education at Columbia University in 1983. Three years later she was given the command of the 105th USAF Clinic in Newburgh, New York. This was the first time that a first Air National Guard nurse had been sole charge of a clinic.

In 1987 she was promoted to major general in the US National Guard. She was the first African American woman to achieve that rank.

In 2001 she retired but decided to take a new role championing the rights of veterans.

She was voted one of the “21 Leaders for the 21st Century” by Women’s eNews.

In 2013 she placed funds with the American Nurses Foundation to create the "Dr. Irene Trowell-Harris Endowed Leadership Fund" to support nurses who aspire to be leaders.
