= Betty Jo Nelsen =

American politician (1935–2024)

Administrator of the Food and Nutrition Service
- In office January 16, 1990 – November 6, 1992
- President: George H. W. Bush
- Preceded by: S. Anna Kondratas
- Succeeded by: Andrew P. Hornsby Jr. (Acting)

Minority Leader of the Wisconsin Assembly
- In office January 5, 1987 – January 3, 1989
- Preceded by: Tommy Thompson
- Succeeded by: David Prosser Jr.

Member of the Wisconsin State Assembly
- In office January 7, 1985 – January 12, 1990
- Preceded by: Spencer Coggs
- Succeeded by: Alberta Darling
- Constituency: 10th District
- In office January 3, 1983 – January 7, 1985
- Preceded by: William J. Rogers
- Succeeded by: Gary J. Schmidt
- Constituency: 5th District
- In office July 24, 1979 – January 3, 1983
- Preceded by: Rod Johnston
- Succeeded by: Spencer Coggs
- Constituency: 10th District

Personal details
- Born: October 11, 1935 Boston, Massachusetts, U.S.
- Died: October 17, 2024 (aged 89)
- Party: Republican
- Children: 3
- Education: Massachusetts State College (BS)

Betty Jo Nelsen (October 11, 1935 – October 17, 2024) was an American politician and who served as Minority Leader of the Wisconsin State Assembly. A Republican, she represented the northeastern suburbs of Milwaukee from 1979 until 1990 in the Assembly. She left the Assembly to accept an appointment in the administration of President George H. W. Bush as Administrator of the Food and Nutrition Service within the United States Department of Agriculture.

== Background ==
Nelsen was born on October 11, 1935. She graduated from Dedham High School, and the University of Massachusetts Amherst in 1957.

Nelson was married with three children and resided in Shorewood, Wisconsin. She died on October 17, 2024, at the age of 89.

== Career ==
Nelsen was first elected to the Assembly as a Republican in a special election in July 1979. She was chosen by the Republican caucus as Minority Leader for the 1987-1988 session of the Assembly. Nelsen was re-elected five times, and remained a member of the Assembly until 1990, when she resigned to accept appointment to the U.S. Food and Nutrition Service in Washington, D.C.

President George H. W. Bush appointed her as Administrator of the Food and Nutrition Service within the U.S. Department of Agriculture in January 1990. She served in that role until the days after Bush's defeat in the 1992 presidential election, when she resigned and returned to the Milwaukee area. During 1992, President Bush had nominated her to become Assistant Secretary of Agriculture for Food and Consumer Services as well as a member of the board of directors of the Commodity Credit Corporation, but her nomination did not receive a vote by the United States Senate Committee on Agriculture, Nutrition and Forestry, and was returned without action when the Senate adjourned in October 1992.

After returning to Wisconsin, she was appointed by Governor Tommy Thompson to serve on the state Natural Resources Board.

Wisconsin State Assembly
Preceded by Rod Johnston	Member of the Wisconsin State Assembly from the 10th district July 24, 1979 – January 3, 1983	Succeeded by Spencer Coggs
Preceded by William J. Rogers	Member of the Wisconsin State Assembly from the 5th district January 3, 1983 – January 7, 1985	Succeeded by Gary J. Schmidt
Preceded by Spencer Coggs	Member of the Wisconsin State Assembly from the 10th district January 7, 1985 – January 12, 1990	Succeeded by Alberta Darling
Preceded by Tommy Thompson	Minority Leader of the Wisconsin State Assembly; January 5, 1987 – January 3, 1989	Succeeded by David Prosser Jr.
Government offices
Preceded by S. Anna Kondratas	Administrator of the Food and Nutrition Service; January 16, 1990 – November 6, 1992	Succeeded by Andrew P. Hornsby Jr. (Acting)
