= Wisconsin's 10th Assembly district =

American legislative district in Milwaukee County, Wisconsin

Wisconsin's 10th State Assembly district
- 2024 map defined in 2023 Wisc. Act 94; 2022 map defined in Johnson v. Wisconsin Elections Commission; 2011 map was defined in 2011 Wisc. Act 43
Assemblymember
Darrin Madison; D–Milwaukee
since January 3, 2023 (3 years)
- Demographics: 43.58% White; 47.19% Black; 5.05% Hispanic; 3.61% Asian; 1.46% Native American; 0.13% Hawaiian/Pacific Islander
- Population (2020) • Voting age: 59,503; 45,220
- Website: Official website
- Notes: Northeast Milwaukee County

The 10th Assembly district of Wisconsin is one of 99 districts in the Wisconsin State Assembly. Located in southeastern Wisconsin, the district is entirely contained within northeastern Milwaukee County. The district comprises several neighborhoods on the north side of the city of Milwaukee, including the Williamsburg Heights, Arlington Heights, and Grover Heights neighborhoods, as well as the neighboring village of Shorewood and the city of Glendale. The district is represented by Democrat Darrin Madison, since January 2023.

The 10th Assembly district is located within Wisconsin's 4th Senate district, along with the 11th and 12th Assembly districts.

== History ==
The district was created in the 1972 redistricting act (1971 Wisc. Act 304) which first established the numbered district system, replacing the previous system which allocated districts to specific counties. The 10th district was drawn roughly in line with the boundaries of the previous Milwaukee County 25th district, with the addition of the village of Bayside. The last representative of the Milwaukee 25th district, Jim Sensenbrenner, was elected as the first representative of the 10th Assembly district in the 1972 election.

The 10th district location has remained relatively consistent, in northern Milwaukee County, through all the redistrictings since 1972. The boundaries of the district have shifted over time to include more of the city of Milwaukee and fewer of the municipalities in the northeast corner of the county.

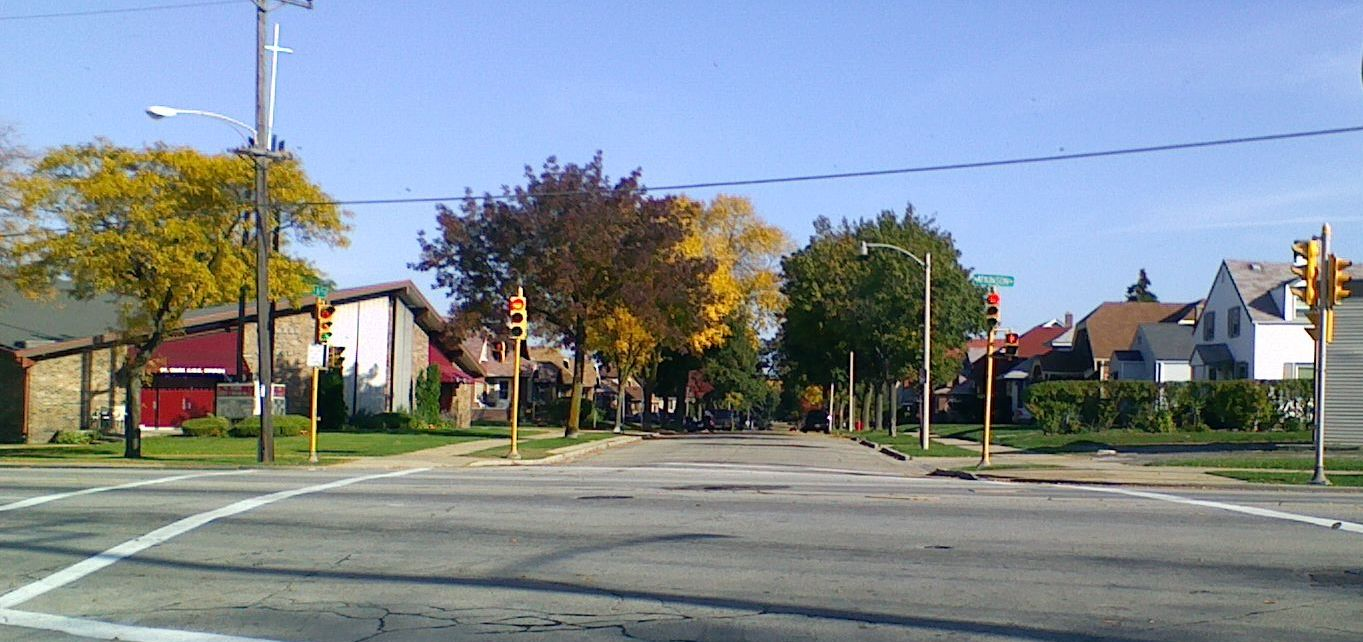
Arlington Heights

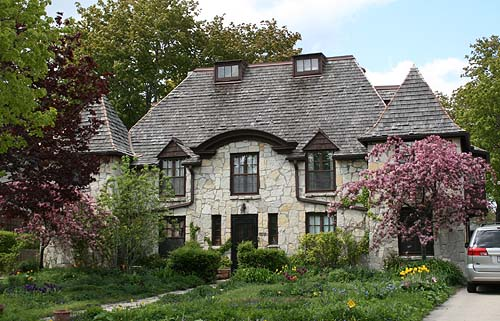
Thomas Bossert House in Shorewood

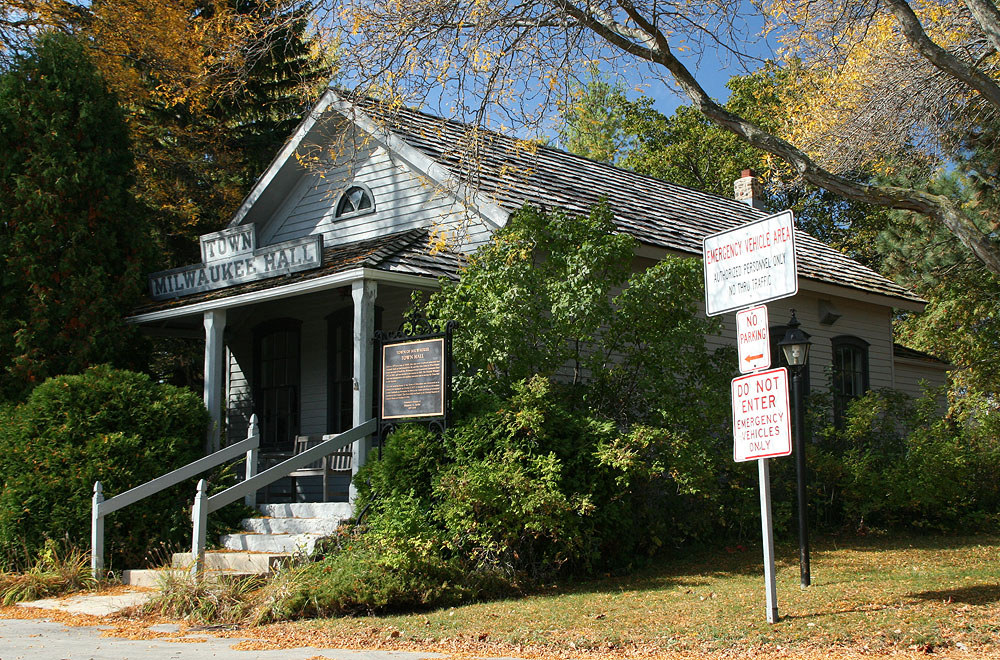
Old town hall of the former town of Milwaukee, now within the city of Glendale

== List of past representatives ==
List of representatives to the Wisconsin State Assembly from the 10th district
Member	Party	Residence	Counties represented	Term start	Term end	Ref.
District created
Jim Sensenbrenner	Rep.	Shorewood	Milwaukee County	January 1, 1973	April 2, 1975	
--Vacant--			Milwaukee County	April 2, 1975	September 2, 1975	
Rod Johnston	Rep.	Whitefish Bay	Milwaukee County	September 2, 1975	April 17, 1979	
--Vacant--			Milwaukee County	April 17, 1979	July 24, 1979	
Betty Jo Nelsen	Rep.	Shorewood	Milwaukee County	July 24, 1979	January 3, 1983	
Spencer Coggs	Dem.	Milwaukee	Milwaukee County	January 3, 1983	January 7, 1985	
Betty Jo Nelsen	Rep.	Shorewood	Milwaukee County	January 7, 1985	January 12, 1990	
--Vacant--			Milwaukee County	January 12, 1990	May 15, 1990	
Alberta Darling	Rep.	River Hills	Milwaukee County	May 15, 1990	January 4, 1993	
Annette Polly Williams	Dem.	Milwaukee	Milwaukee County	January 4, 1993	January 3, 2011	
Elizabeth M. Coggs	Dem.	Milwaukee	Milwaukee County	January 3, 2011	January 7, 2013	
Sandy Pasch	Dem.	Shorewood	Milwaukee County	January 7, 2013	January 5, 2015	
David Bowen	Dem.	Milwaukee	Milwaukee County	January 5, 2015	January 2, 2023	
Darrin Madison	Dem.	Milwaukee	Milwaukee County	January 3, 2023	Current	
