= Barbara Toles =

American politician

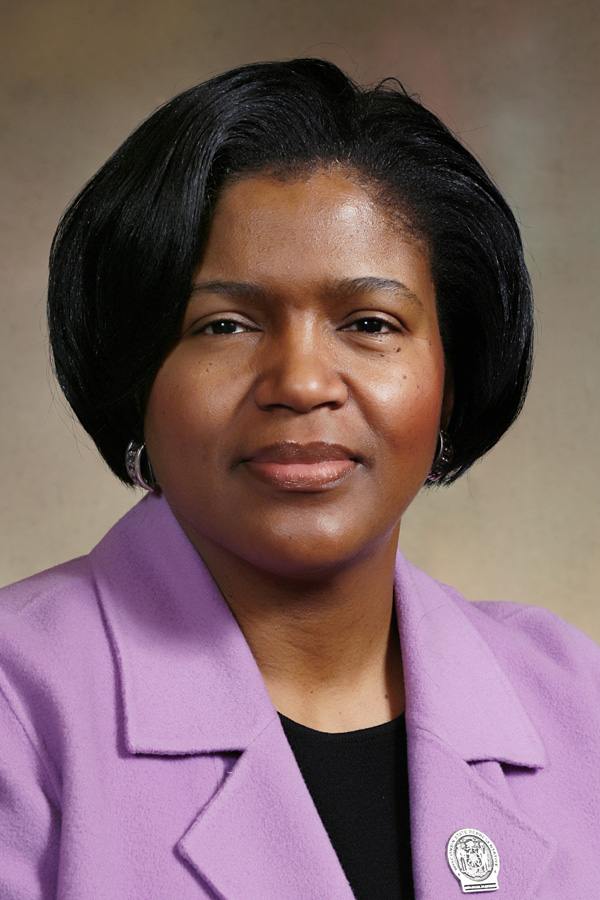

Member of the Wisconsin State Assembly from the 17th district
- In office February 3, 2004 – July 2, 2012
- Preceded by: G. Spencer Coggs
- Succeeded by: La Tonya Johnson

Personal details
- Born: July 31, 1956 (age 70) Milwaukee, Wisconsin, U.S.
- Party: Democratic
- Education: University of Wisconsin–Madison, Marquette University

Barbara L. Toles (born July 31, 1956) is an American community organizer and Democratic politician from Milwaukee, Wisconsin. She served eight years in the Wisconsin State Assembly, representing Wisconsin's 17th Assembly district from 2004 to 2012.

== Biography ==
Barbara Toles was born in Milwaukee, Wisconsin, in July 1956. She graduated from Milwaukee's West Division High School in 1973, and went on to earn her bachelor's degree from the University of Wisconsin–Madison, in 1979. After graduating she went to work as a teacher in Milwaukee and became a member of the American Federation of Teachers union Local 212. While working as a teacher, she continued her own education at Marquette University, and earned her M.Ed. degree in 1997.

In 2003, state representative Spencer Coggs won a recall election to replace scandal-plagued state senator Gary George. Coggs thus had to vacate his Assembly seat, necessitating a new special election in the 17th Assembly district. Toles ran as a Democrat for the vacant seat in the January 2004 special election. Her only opponent was independent Wendell Harris, and she prevailed with 79% of the vote. She was sworn in February 3, 2004.

Toles won re-election four times in the district. In April 2012, Toles announced she would not run for re-election. She later resigned her seat early, effective July 2, 2012.

Since leaving office, Toles has remained active with the teachers' union and the community. Most recently, she has been vocal in initiatives to increase road safety and decrease traffic deaths in Milwaukee.

Wisconsin State Assembly
Preceded by G. Spencer Coggs	Member of the Wisconsin State Assembly from the 17th district February 3, 2004 – July 2, 2012	Succeeded by La Tonya Johnson
