= Isaac N. Coggs =

20th century American politician

Isaac Coggs

Member of the Wisconsin State Assembly from the Milwaukee 6th district
- In office January 5, 1953 – January 4, 1965
- Preceded by: Le Roy Simmons
- Succeeded by: Lloyd Barbee

Personal details
- Born: June 5, 1920 Muskogee, Oklahoma, U.S.
- Died: April 8, 1973 (aged 52) Milwaukee, Wisconsin, U.S.
- Resting place: Forest Home Cemetery, Milwaukee
- Party: Democratic
- Spouse: Marcia Priscilla Young
- Children: 4, including Elizabeth M. Coggs
- Relatives: Spencer Coggs (nephew)
- Education: University of Wisconsin (B.S.)

Military service
- Allegiance: United States
- Branch/service: United States Army
- Years of service: 1943–1944
- Battles/wars: World War II

Isaac Newton Coggs (June 5, 1920 – April 8, 1973) was an American accountant, Democratic politician, and civil rights leader from Milwaukee, Wisconsin. He was a member of the Wisconsin State Assembly for six terms, from 1953 to 1965. In the Assembly, he was the second African American to chair a Wisconsin legislative committee. He was the first African American member of the Milwaukee County Board of Supervisors. He led an effort against housing discrimination in Milwaukee in the 1960s.

His wife, Marcia P. Coggs, and daughter, Elizabeth M. Coggs, later served in the Wisconsin State Assembly. His nephew, Spencer Coggs, also served in the Assembly and Wisconsin Senate.

== Early life and career ==
Born in Muskogee, Oklahoma, Coggs graduated from the University of Wisconsin–Madison and served in the United States Army during World War II. Coggs was an accountant by trade, and served as President of the Northside Milwaukee Businessmen's Association, member of the YMCA Board, American Legion, and Disabled American Veterans. He served in the Wisconsin State Assembly from 1953 to 1964, and then the Milwaukee County Board of Supervisors from 1964 until 1968.

During his time in the legislature, Coggs served as chairman of the Assembly Public Welfare Committee, as well as a member of the Revision Committee and Civil War Centennial Committee.

=== Civil rights legislation ===
In June 1961, Coggs introduced a Humans Rights bill in the Wisconsin Assembly with two civil rights provisions: a fair housing law and a plan to reform fair employment practices. Though Wisconsin Governor Gaylord Nelson supported the bill, it was met with resistance in committee, facing amendments to defeat or weaken it. The state National Association for the Advancement of Colored People called for a protest in response to the opposition to the bill on the steps of the Wisconsin State Capitol building. Seven hundred mostly supporters participated in nonviolent protests throughout the summer. On August 11, the bill was defeated in the assembly. Coggs was disappointed by his Democratic colleagues for their rejection of his legislation, stating that, "We have a case of Dixiecrats. The Mason-Dixon line may be just south of Wisconsin Avenue."

Coggs had a friendly relationship with President John F. Kennedy. Kennedy told Coggs that a picture of him hung in his office.

== Awards and honors ==
In 1978, Milwaukee Health Services, Inc. rededicated one of their health centers to be known as the "Isaac Coggs Heritage Health Center."

In 2017 Wisconsin Senate Joint Resolution 7, Coggs was honored for his service to the state.

Wisconsin State Assembly
| Preceded by Le Roy Simmons | Member of the Wisconsin State Assembly from the Milwaukee 6th district January 5, 1953 – January 4, 1965 | Succeeded by Lloyd Barbee |
