= Nikiya Harris Dodd =

American politician (born 1975)

Nikiya Q. Harris Dodd
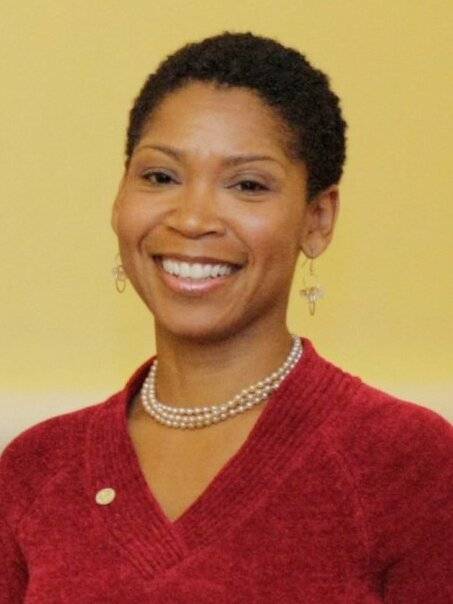
- Harris Dodd in 2011

Member of the Milwaukee Common Council from the 5th district
- In office November 13, 2018 – November 25, 2022
- Preceded by: Jim Bohl
- Succeeded by: Lamont T. Westmoreland

Member of the Wisconsin Senate from the 6th district
- In office January 7, 2013 – January 2, 2017
- Preceded by: Spencer Coggs
- Succeeded by: La Tonya Johnson

Personal details
- Born: February 22, 1975 (age 51)
- Party: Democratic
- Education: University of Wisconsin–Milwaukee (BA, MA)
- Profession: Politician

Nikiya Q. Dodd, formerly Nikiya Harris (born February 22, 1975) is a Wisconsin educator and politician who formerly served as a county supervisor of Milwaukee County, Wisconsin from 2010 through 2012, and as a Democratic member of the Wisconsin State Senate representing the 6th Senate district from 2013 to 2017. She served on the Milwaukee Common Council from 2018 until retiring at the end of November 2022.

== Early life, education, and career ==
Nikiya Harris was born and raised in Milwaukee. She is a graduate of Washington High School. A former pre-school teacher and pre-college coordinator, she graduated from the University of Wisconsin–Milwaukee with a bachelor's degree in community education and a master's degree in adult education.

Prior to serving in elected office, Harris worked in fund development for the Urban Ecology Center. Through her work, she empowered families to take back their neighborhoods and communities through environmental initiatives such as urban gardening, safe and clean parks, and involvement in recreational activities.

== Elected office ==
=== Milwaukee County Board of Supervisors ===
On May 25, 2010, Nikiya Harris was elected 2nd District County Supervisor in an eleven-candidate race. After her election to the Milwaukee County Board of Supervisors, she opposed Wisconsin Governor Scott Walker's Voter ID law. She eased voter access to the polls by pushing forth an initiative that allowed thousands of Milwaukee residents to receive a free birth certificate. She also proposed and executed a successful plan to remove oversight of the Milwaukee House of Corrections from the County Sheriff. Under the new plan, oversight shifted to a superintendent appointed by the Milwaukee County Board.

=== Wisconsin Senate ===
In 2012, Supervisor Harris ran for state senate in Wisconsin's 6th Senate District in a heavily-contested five-way primary after former senator Spencer Coggs was elected as County Treasurer. She won the primary with 47.9% of the vote. She was sworn into office on January 7, 2013.

During the 2013–2014 legislative session, Harris served on a number of committees in the Wisconsin State Legislature, including Education, Government Operations, Public Works, and Telecommunications, Judiciary and Labor, and Law Revision. She also served on the Joint Committee for Review of Administrative Rules. Harris Dodd currently serves on the Legislative Council Study Committee on Adoption Disruption and Dissolution, which held its first meeting in July 2014. During the same legislative session, Harris pushed for an increase to the minimum wage, access to job training, and affordable healthcare. She also put forth initiatives to repair Milwaukee's foreclosure crisis and reform Wisconsin's criminal justice system and mental health system.

In April 2014, Harris' bill creating the Milwaukee County Emergency Detention Pilot Program was signed into law. The program puts the authority to initiate emergency detentions into the hands of qualified mental health professionals rather than solely in the hands of the police. The law is intended to stop negative police interjection into mental health crisis situations.

She did not seek re-election in 2016, and was succeeded by fellow Democrat La Tonya Johnson.

=== Milwaukee Common Council ===
In 2018 she was elected as a Milwaukee City Alderman for the 5th District in a special election. In November 2022, Dodd (who had been missing a number of meetings) announced that she was resigning by the end of the month "[d]ue to serious family and medical issues that have taken priority".

== Subsequent career ==
After leaving the Milwaukee Common Council, Harris Dodd became development director at the Dr. Howard Fuller Collegiate Academy, a public charter high school in Milwaukee.

== Personal life ==
Determined to keep her siblings out of the foster care system after her mother's death, Harris became guardian to three of her younger siblings and raised them herself. Harris Dodd and her husband, Anthony Dodd Sr., live on Milwaukee's west side. On October 12, 2014, she gave birth to Anthony Thomas Dodd Jr.

Harris Dodd is a member of the Democratic Party of Wisconsin, as well as a member of the Milwaukee Child Welfare Partnership Council and the Wisconsin Housing and Economic Development Authority Board (WHEDA). She also serves on the Community Advisory Board for Felmers Chaney Correctional Center and is the vice-chair of the Milwaukee Black Male Achievement Advisory Council.
