= Sandy Pasch =

American Democratic politician (b. 1954)

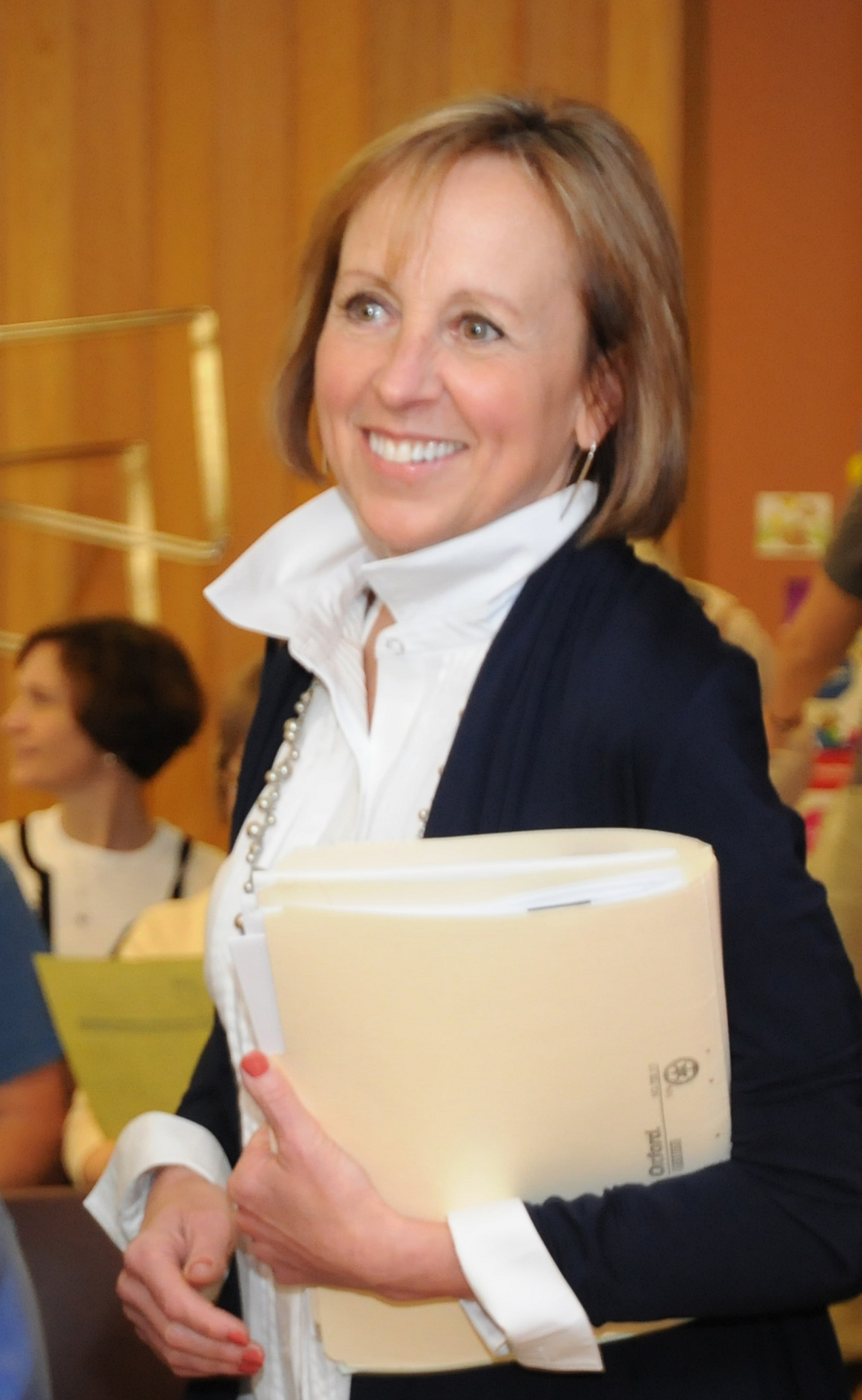
- Pasch in 2011.

Member of the Wisconsin State Assembly
- In office January 7, 2013 – January 5, 2015
- Preceded by: Elizabeth M. Coggs
- Succeeded by: David Bowen
- Constituency: 10th district
- In office January 5, 2009 – January 7, 2013
- Preceded by: Sheldon Wasserman
- Succeeded by: Don Pridemore
- Constituency: 22nd district

Personal details
- Born: Sandra Kawczynski; May 19, 1954 (age 72) Milwaukee, Wisconsin, U.S.
- Party: Democratic
- Children: 3
- Education: University of Wisconsin–Madison (B.S.N.); University of Rochester (M.S.N.); Medical College of Wisconsin (M.A.)
- Profession: Nurse, politician

Sandra Pasch (née Kawczynski; born May 19, 1954) is an American politician and nurse. She served six years in the Wisconsin State Assembly as a Democrat (2009–2015), representing north-central Milwaukee County.

== Background ==
Pasch was born Sandra Kawczynski in Milwaukee, on May 19, 1954. She graduated from Bay View High School in 1972; received a bachelor's degree in nursing at the University of Wisconsin–Madison in 1976; a Master of Science in Psychiatric-Mental Health Nursing at the University of Rochester in 1981; and a Master of Arts in Bioethics at the Medical College of Wisconsin in 1999. She worked as an assistant professor at Columbia College of Nursing; as a clinical nurse specialist; and as a community health nurse.

== Elective office ==
Pasch was elected to the assembly in 2008. After winning a four-way Democratic primary with a narrow plurality, she easily defeated Republican nominee Yash P. Wadhwa by 21,938 to 10,720. She was assigned to the standing committees on public health (serving as vice chair); on corrections and the courts; on criminal justice; on health and healthcare reform; and on housing.

In 2009, Pasch's campaign records showed that she received two contributions totaling $125 on February 18, during budget negotiations. This violated a new rule, passed two weeks prior, which restricted lawmakers from soliciting or accepting campaign contributions until the state budget was voted into law. According to Pasch, the date was a typo, and she did not receive any contributions after the budget negotiations began.

Sandy Pasch voted to pass the 2009 Wisconsin budget.

Pasch voted against censuring State Representative Jeffrey Wood after being arrested for driving while intoxicated and being in possession of THC and drug paraphernalia.

Pasch voted against requiring a two-thirds majority in the legislature in order to pass legislation to increase taxes.

On May 6, 2011, Pasch announced that she would be running for the Wisconsin State Senate's 8th District against incumbent Republican Alberta Darling, who was the subject of a recall election. She won her primary against Gladys Huber with over 60% of the votes cast, but lost the general election by an 8% margin.

Pasch serves on the board of Citizen Action of Wisconsin, a group which supported Pasch in the recall election. The treasurer of her campaign also serves as treasurer of Citizen Action. In August, Republicans filed a complaint alleging possible illegal coordination between Citizen Action of Wisconsin and Pasch's senate campaign. Both Pasch and the director of Citizen Action stated that there was no coordination whatsoever between the two

=== 2012 election ===
After her district was basically eliminated by the Republican-controlled legislature in 2011, Pasch announced that she would be moving from her home in Whitefish Bay into the Assembly district then represented by Elizabeth Coggs (who was running for the State Senate), which had been redistricted to include portions of Pasch's old district. Amid accusations of "carpetbagging" and assertions that up to half the seats currently held by African-Americans could go to white candidates, Pasch argued that "I agree diversity is important... But what is very, very important is that there is a representative in the district who will listen, who will take action after listening, someone who will fight"; and noted she is the only Jewish member of the Assembly. She was endorsed by Tamara Grigsby.

Calls by Coggs to the mostly-black voters at an inner-city candidate forum to "vote for someone who looks like you" led to accusations that she was attacking Pasch, the only white candidate in the race. Several African-American candidates at the forum decried her remarks as racist. None of Pasch's opponents (who included Ieshuh Griffin) had held elected office. "I don't think anyone should vote for anyone on account of their skin color," Griffin said of Coggs' remarks. "It's not about color." Coggs' predecessor, Polly Williams, describing Pasch as "a White suburban woman" who "can’t win in her own district", had already expressed concern that inner-city seats such as hers could be lost to white Democrats as a result of machinations by "non-Black forces from outside the community". Williams, like Coggs, endorsed one of Pasch's rivals. The 10th district Democratic nomination (tantamount to election in this heavily-Democratic district) was nonetheless taken by Pasch, with over 60% of the vote. She won the general election easily.

== 2014 election ==
In 2014, Pasch chose not to run for re-election. After a hard-fought Democratic primary (no other parties fielded candidates), the nomination went to County Supervisor David Bowen, whom Pasch had endorsed.

== Personal life ==
She is married and has three children. She is Jewish.

== Electoral history ==
Wisconsin State Senate District 8 Recall Election 2011
Party	Candidate	Votes	%	±%
Republican	Alberta Darling	39,471	54%	
Democratic	Sandra Pasch	34,096	46%	

Wisconsin State Assembly
Preceded by Sheldon Wasserman	Member of the Wisconsin State Assembly from the 22nd district January 5, 2009 – January 7, 2013	Succeeded by Don Pridemore
Preceded by Elizabeth M. Coggs	Member of the Wisconsin State Assembly from the 10th district January 7, 2013 – January 5, 2015	Succeeded by David Bowen
