= Lloyd Barbee =

American politician (1925–2002)

Member of the Wisconsin State Assembly
- In office January 1965 – January 3, 1977
- Succeeded by: Marcia P. Coggs
- Constituency: 6th district (1965–1973); 18th district (1973–1977)

Personal details
- Born: Lloyd Augustus Barbee; August 17, 1925 Memphis, Tennessee, U.S.
- Died: December 29, 2002 (aged 77) Milwaukee, Wisconsin, U.S.
- Party: Democratic
- Education: LeMoyne–Owen College (BA); University of Wisconsin–Madison (JD)

Military service
- Branch/service: United States Navy
- Years of service: 1943–1946

Lloyd Augustus Barbee (August 17, 1925 – December 29, 2002) was an American lawyer and politician who worked for civil rights. He led the effort to integrate the Milwaukee Public School system. He was a Democrat.

== Early life and education ==
Born in Memphis, Tennessee, Barbee joined the NAACP at age twelve. He served in the United States Navy from 1943 to 1946. In 1949, he earned a Bachelor of Arts degree in economics all-black LeMoyne–Owen College and enrolled at the University of Wisconsin Law School, but he soon dropped out due to the racial prejudice of some faculty and students. Later he returned to the University of Wisconsin. In 1955, he was elected president of the Madison chapter of the NAACP, and he completed law school in 1956.

== Career ==
In 1962 Barbee moved to Milwaukee, which was very racially segregated. In 1963, working for the NAACP, he challenged the Milwaukee Public Schools to integrate. The school system refused, claiming that the segregation of its schools resulted not from its policies, but from segregated neighborhoods. In response Barbee organized civil rights activists into the Milwaukee United School Integration Committee (MUSIC), which organized boycotts of the schools and blocked buses, aiming to bring attention to the problem.

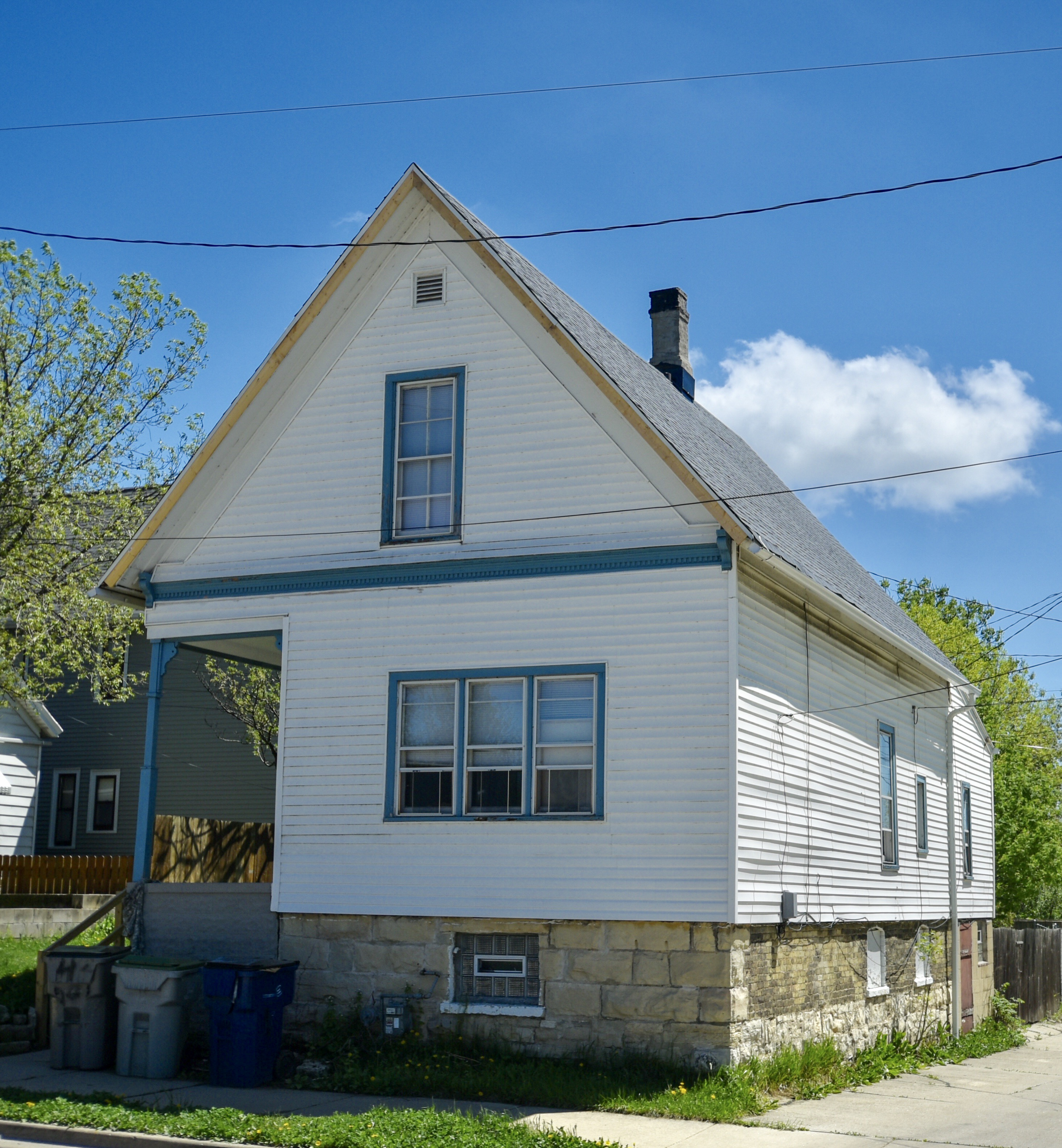
Barbee lived in this house on Near North Side from 1966 to 1980. It is listed on the National Register of Historic Places for its association with Barbee.

In 1964 Barbee ran to represent what was then the 6th district of Milwaukee in the Wisconsin State Assembly and won. From 1965 to 1977 he was the only African-American in the state legislature. During that time he introduced a State Fair Housing bill, and worked for fair employment, gay rights, women's rights, prison reform, legalization of drugs and prostitution, disarming police officers, and taxation of churches.

The school boycotts did not sway Milwaukee's school board, so in 1965 Barbee filed a federal lawsuit Amos et al. v. Board of School Directors of the City of Milwaukee, arguing that MPS's neighborhood school policy did indeed preserve and intensify school segregation. This claim was supported by research conducted by Barbee, Marilyn Morheuser and MUSIC volunteers. The case ground on for years, with Barbee often working alone against MPS's lawyers, but in 1976 federal judge John W. Reynolds Jr. ruled in favor of Barbee, writing "I have concluded that segregation exists in the Milwaukee public schools and that this segregation was intentionally created and maintained by the defendants." MPS appealed the decision all the way to the Supreme Court, but that court supported Judge Reynold's judgment and Barbee's case. In 1979, MPS agreed to change its policies, and began making progress toward integrating its schools.

In later years Barbee continued his law practice. From 1978 to 2000, he taught in the Africology department at the University of Wisconsin–Milwaukee, and he continued to work for justice and social change in Milwaukee until he died in 2002.
