= Spencer Coggs =

American politician (born 1949)

G. Spencer Coggs
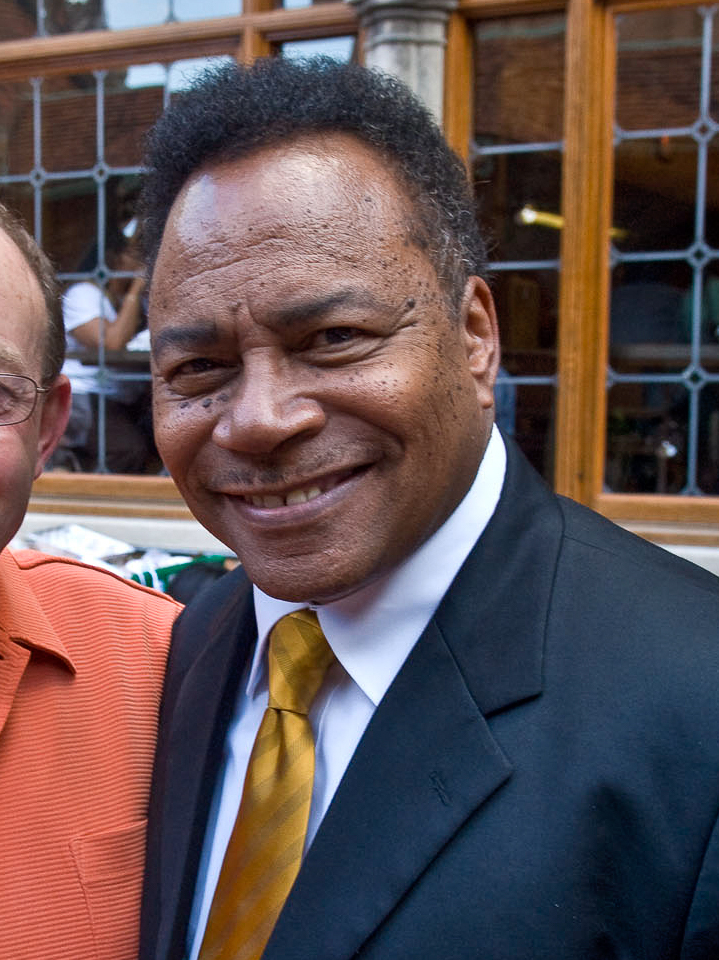
- Coggs in 2010

Milwaukee City Treasurer
- Incumbent
- Assumed office April 2012
- Preceded by: Wayne F. Whittow

Member of the Wisconsin Senate
- In office November 25, 2003 – January 6, 2013
- Preceded by: Gary George
- Succeeded by: Nikiya Harris
- Constituency: 6th district

Member of the Wisconsin State Assembly
- In office January 4, 1993 – November 25, 2003
- Preceded by: Annette Polly Williams
- Succeeded by: Barbara Toles
- Constituency: 17th district
- In office January 7, 1985 – January 4, 1993
- Preceded by: Jeannette Bell
- Succeeded by: Leon Young
- Constituency: 16th district
- In office January 3, 1983 – January 7, 1985
- Preceded by: Betty Jo Nelsen
- Succeeded by: Betty Jo Nelsen
- Constituency: 10th district

Personal details
- Born: August 6, 1949 (age 77) Milwaukee, Wisconsin, U.S.
- Party: Democratic
- Spouse: Married
- Children: 2
- Relatives: Isaac N. Coggs (uncle); Elizabeth M. Coggs (cousin)
- Education: Milwaukee Area Technical College (A.A.); University of Wisconsin–Milwaukee (B.S.)
- Profession: Health officer; politician

George Spencer Coggs (born August 6, 1949) is an American public administrator and Democratic politician from Milwaukee, Wisconsin who has served since 2012 as the Milwaukee City Treasurer. Coggs previously served 10 years in the Wisconsin Senate and 20 years in the Wisconsin State Assembly, representing Milwaukee's west side. His uncle, Isaac N. Coggs, and cousin, Elizabeth M. Coggs, also served in the Assembly.

== Early life, education and career ==
Coggs was a City of Milwaukee health officer (and Chief Steward of his AFSCME union local), postal worker and industrial printer.

== Wisconsin legislature ==
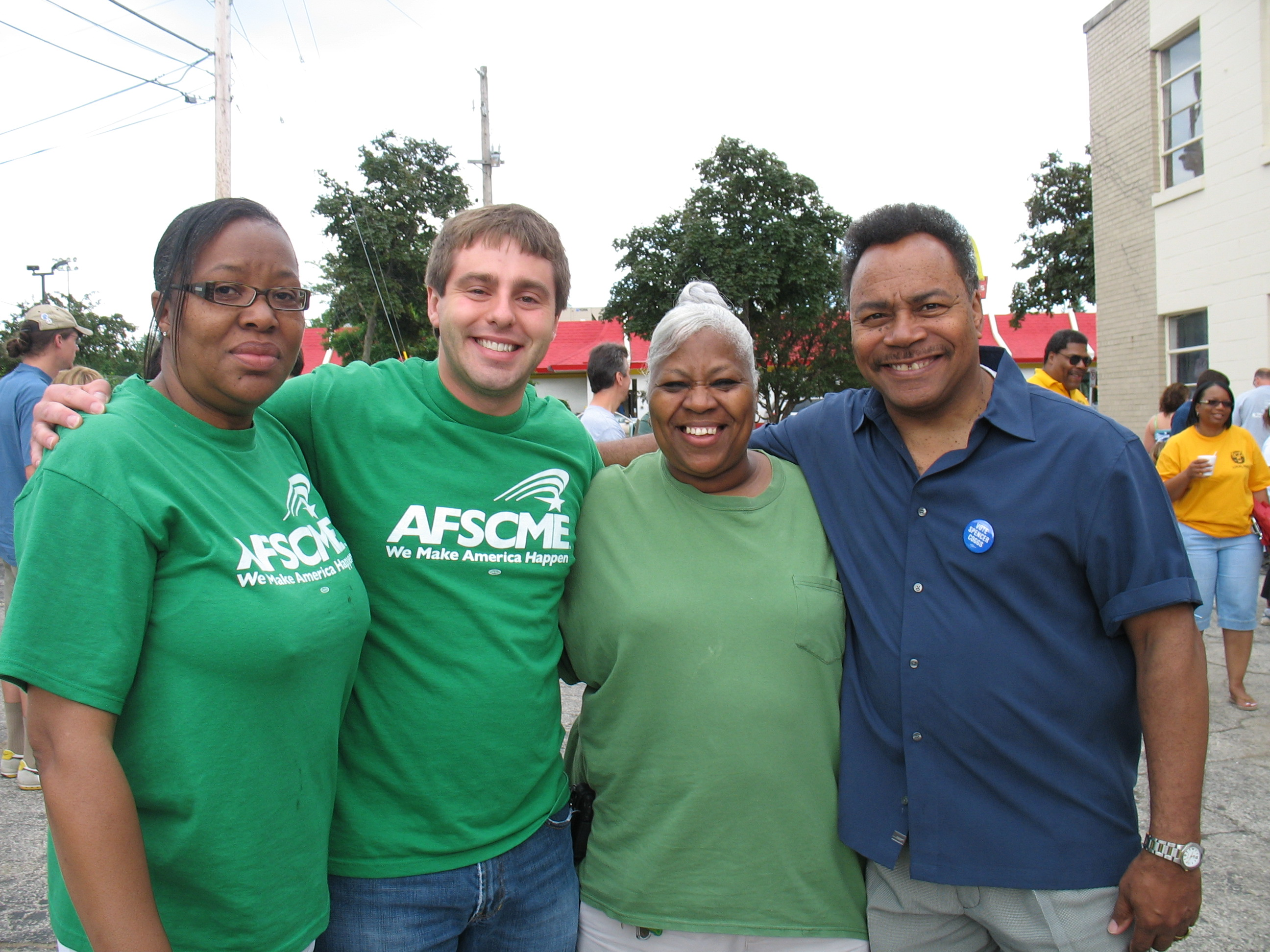
Coggs (right) with AFSCME organizers during campaign work for the 2008 elections

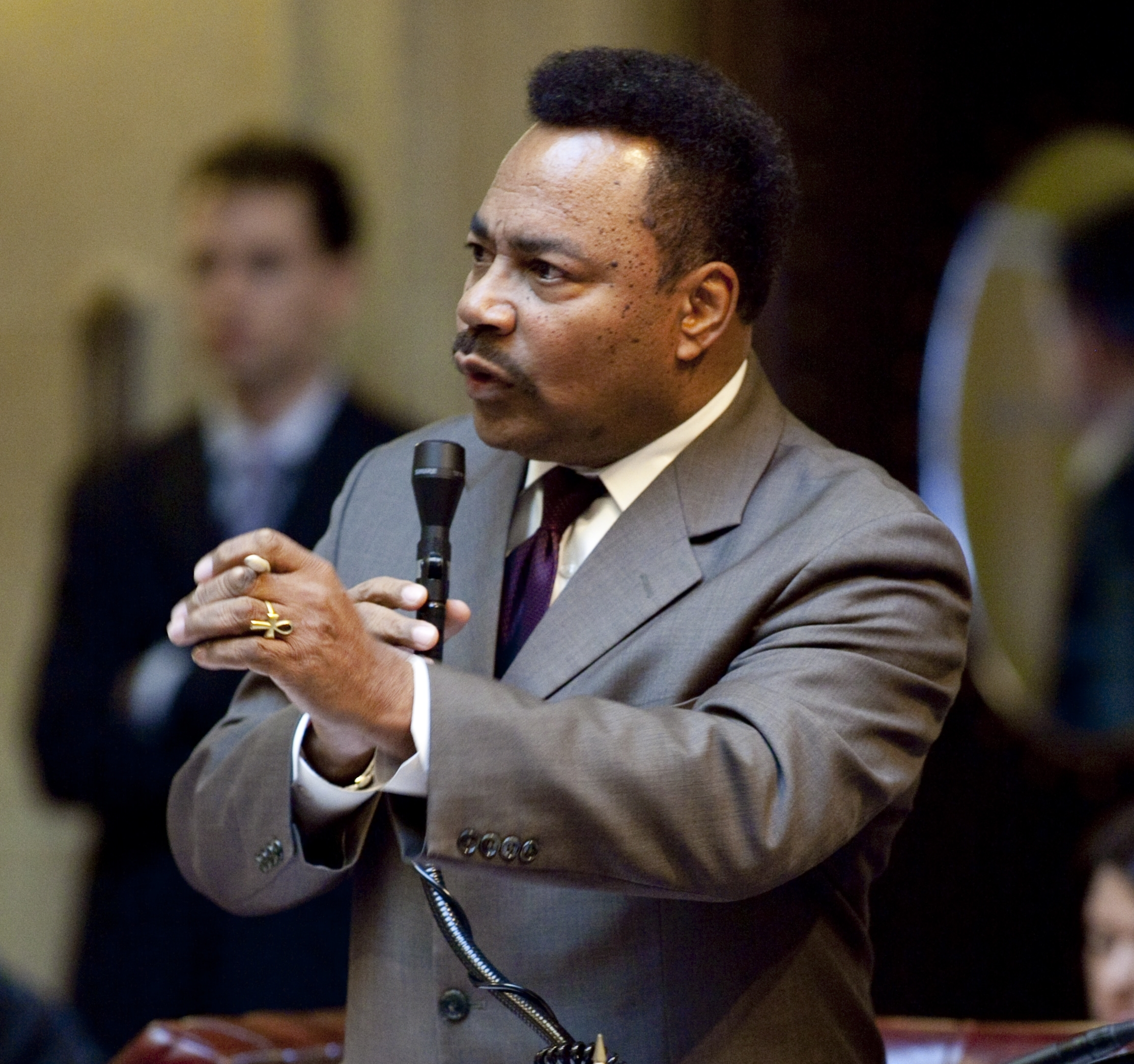
Coggs speaking in the state senate in 2009

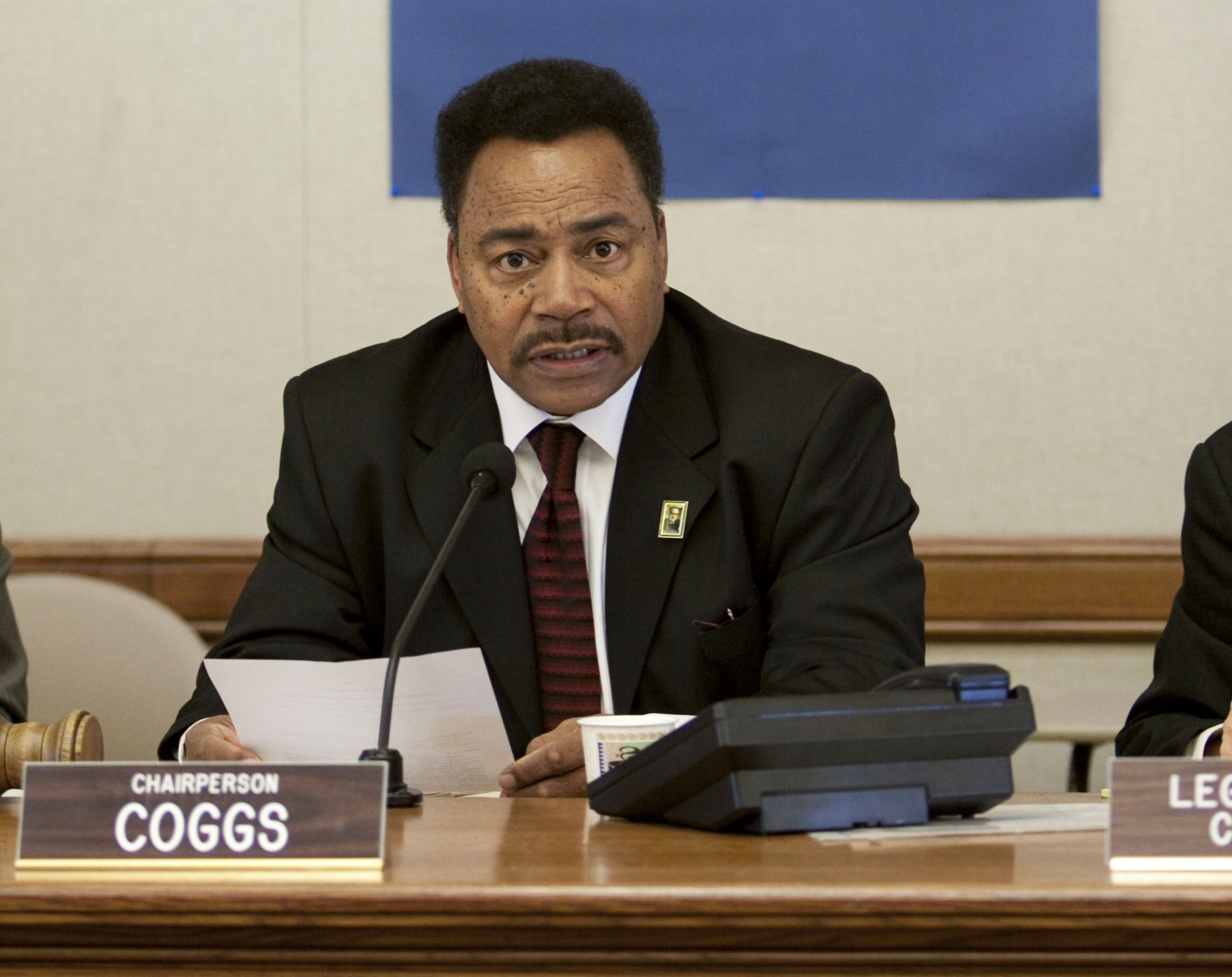
Coggs chairing a committee hearing in 2009

Coggs was elected to the Wisconsin State Assembly for what was then the 10th district in 1982 and reelected until 2002. During his time in the assembly he was the Majority Caucus Vice Chairperson in 1985, 1987 and 1989.

He was elected in 2003 to the state senate in a special election and reelected in 2004 and 2008. He sat on the Committee on Housing and Financial Institutions, and Joint Committee for Review of Criminal Penalties.

Coggs was vice president of the National Labor Caucus of State Legislators.

=== 2011 Wisconsin protests ===
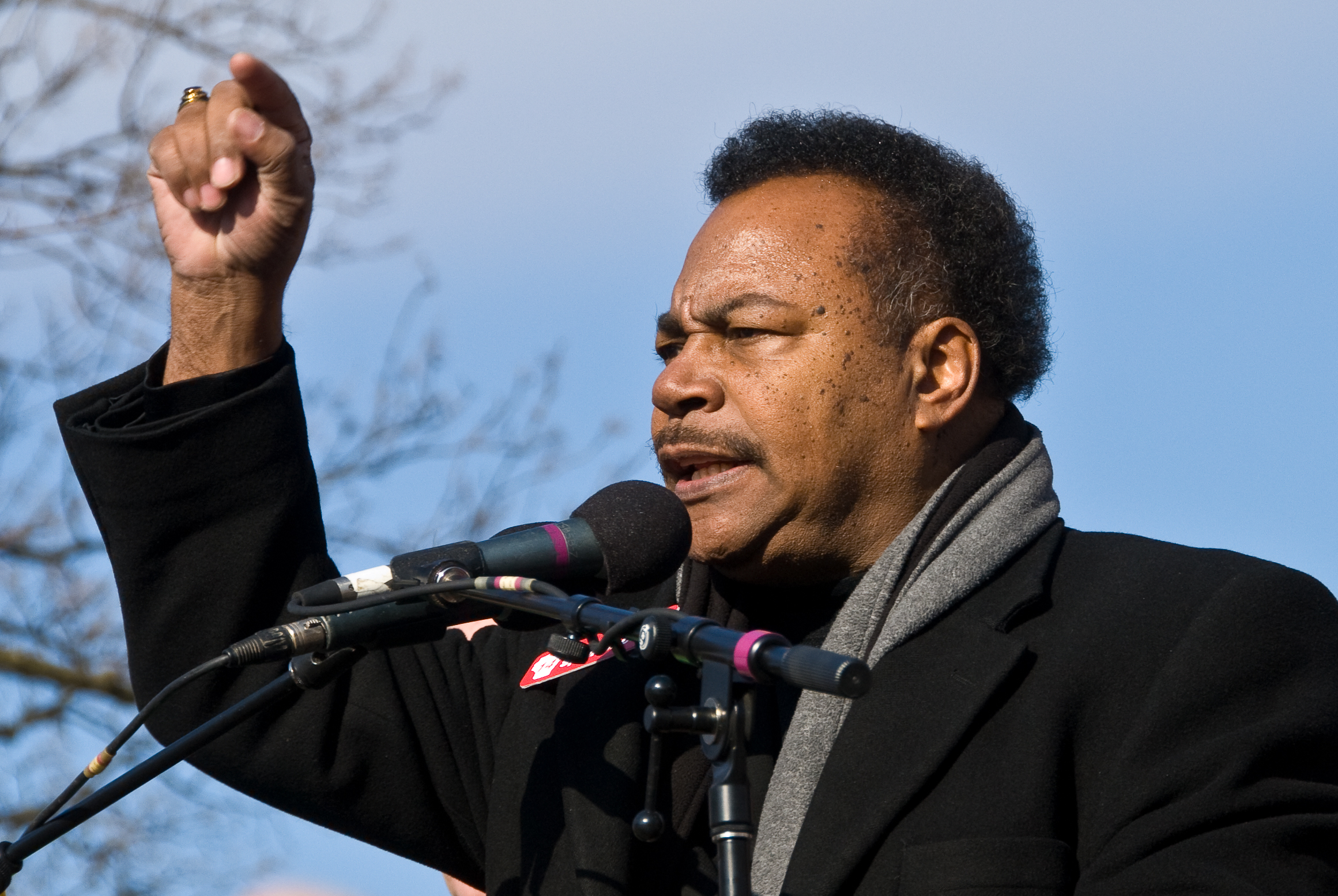
Coggs speaking during the protest outside of the Wisconsin State Capitol on March 12, 2011 during the 2011 Wisconsin protests

During the protests in Wisconsin, Coggs, along with the 13 other Democratic State Senators, fled the state to deny the State Senate a quorum on Governor Scott Walker's controversial "Budget Repair" legislation.

== Running for other offices ==
Coggs announced December 22, 2009, that he was running for the position of Lieutenant Governor of Wisconsin in 2010. (Current Lt. Gov. Barbara Lawton was not seeking a third term.) On September 14, he lost the Democratic nomination in a four-way race, with fellow legislator Tom Nelson winning an absolute majority (52%) over Coggs' 21% and two other candidates with smaller percentages.

In February 2012, Coggs was one of two State Senators (the other being fellow Democrat Tim Carpenter) to win a place on the ballot for Milwaukee City Treasurer in the Spring 2012 election, defeating former State Treasurer Dawn Marie Sass (like Coggs, a former AFSCME activist) and Socialist Rick Kissell in the non-partisan primary. Coggs polled 13,559 votes; Carpenter 12,880; Sass 5,089 and Kissell 2,241. In the general election, Coggs won with 35,096 votes to Carpenter's 34,293.

After he was sworn in as Treasurer in mid-April, Coggs announced that he would not be resigning his position as Senator until a new Senator could be elected. "With us in the state Senate tied 16–16, it just makes sense for me to keep my position. If I were to leave, I'm not saying my Republican friends would cause mischief, but I don't want to give them any temptation," he stated. He said that he would donate his second salary to an as-yet-unnamed charity. Two incumbent Assembly Democrats, his cousin Elizabeth Coggs and Sandy Pasch, had already announced that they would be running for the vacant seat (although Pasch later changed her mind). In the end, he was succeeded in the Senate by another Democrat, Nikiya Harris.
