= Columbia College of Nursing =

Nursing school in Wisconsin, US

Coordinates: 43.079387°N 87.883749°W

The Columbia College of Nursing (previously known as the Knowlton Hospital Training School and Columbia Hospital School of Nursing) is a nursing school, now located in Glendale, Wisconsin, a northern suburb of Milwaukee, Wisconsin, U.S.

== History ==
The Knowlton Hospital Training School was founded at the same time as Knowlton Hospital itself, in 1901. When Knowlton became Columbia Hospital in 1909, the name was changed to the Columbia Hospital School of Nursing. In June 2010, the College moved to a new structure in Glendale, as the existing Columbia Hospital was shutting down and the buildings (including those housing the College) were to be sold to the University of Wisconsin–Milwaukee. Columbia College of Nursing was acquired by Alverno College on July 1, 2020.

The college grants the Bachelor of Science in Nursing (BSN) degree.

== Notable faculty ==
- Sandy Pasch, Wisconsin state legislator, was an assistant professor at the college.
