= Urban Ecology Center =

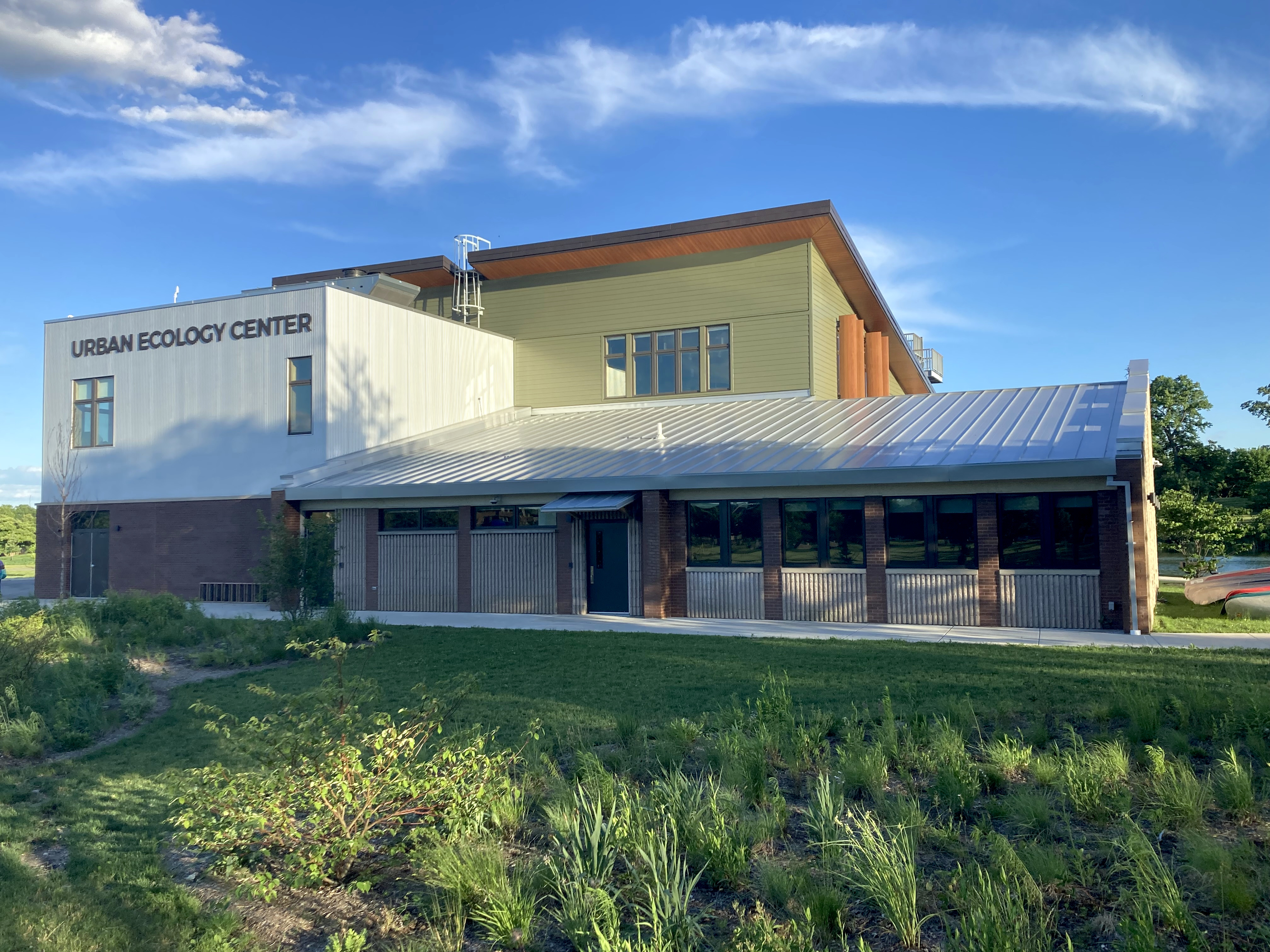
- Urban Ecology Center in Washington Park
- Founded: 1991
- Type: Non-profit
- Location: Riverside Park, Milwaukee, Wisconsin, US, 1500 E. Park Place (administrative offices)
- Coordinates: 43°04′03.5″N 87°53′26.8″W (administrative offices)
- Region served: Riverside Park; Washington Park; Menomonee Valley
- Key people: Ken Leinbach, Executive Director
- Website: Urban Ecology Center
- Formerly called: Riverside Urban; Environmental Center

The Urban Ecology Center is a nonprofit organization in Milwaukee, Wisconsin. Their mission is to educate the Milwaukee community about the environment, conservation, sustainability, and other issues related to urban ecology, as well as to preserve and protect the natural areas in the city.

In 1991, a group of residents of the Riverside Park neighborhood founded the Riverside Urban Environmental Center in response to the growing crime and pollution in Riverside Park. The neighborhood surrounding Riverside Park, was at one time an affluent neighborhood, which eventually became polluted and had an increase of criminal activity, while similar problems occurred in the neighborhoods surrounding Washington Park and Menomonee Valley.

The organization is headquartered in the Riverside Park neighborhood. There are two other branches: the Washington Park branch which opened in 2007 and the Menomonee Valley branch which opened in 2012.

== Branches ==
One of the organizations main focuses is to revitalize parks in urban neighborhoods to educate urban youth about environmentalism and nature. All three branches have a specific focus on urban nature and programs concerning conservation, which have revitalized their respective neighborhoods, which have experienced economic downturn and criminal activity.

=== Riverside Park ===
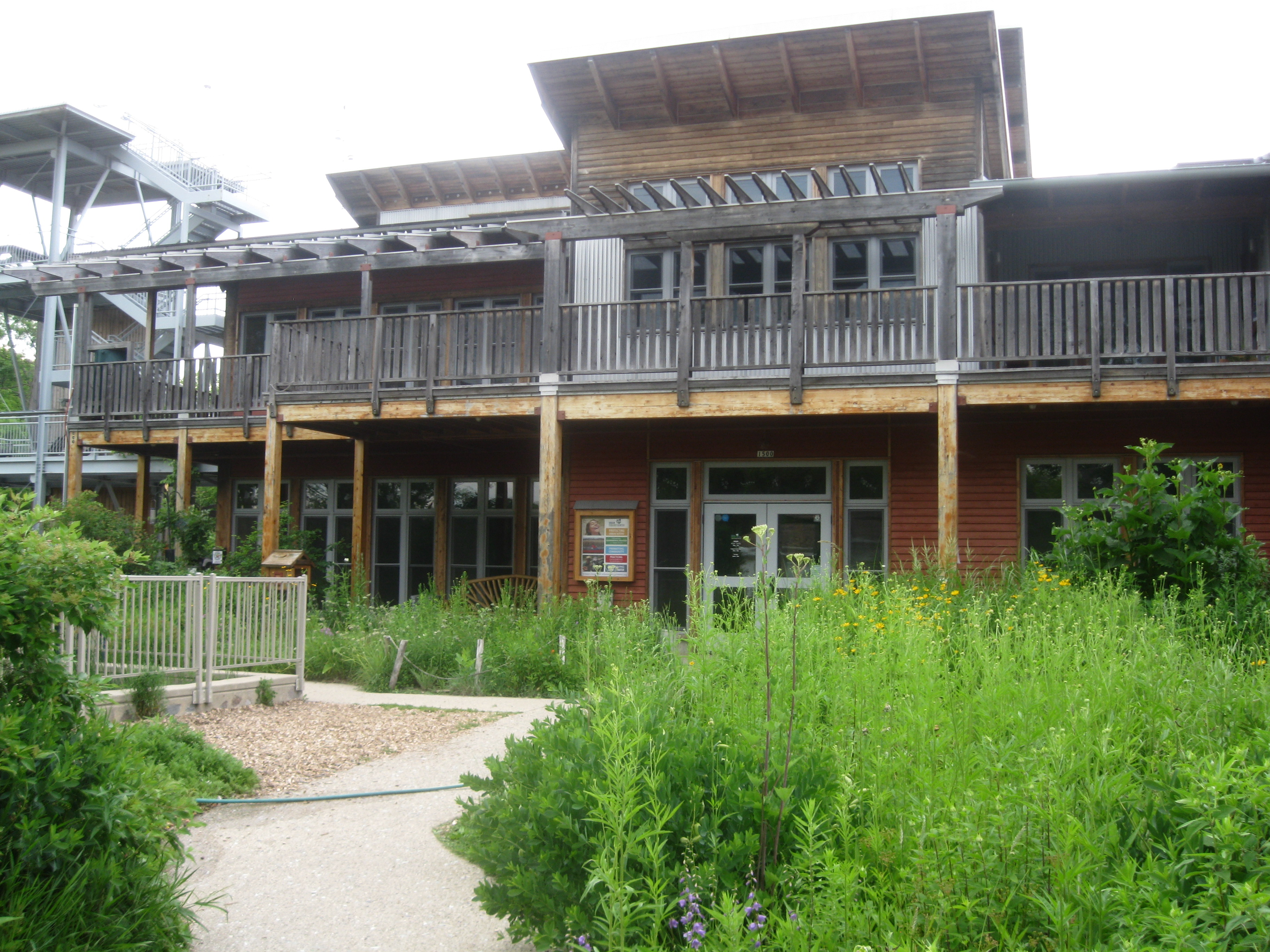
The entrance of the Riverside Park branch

Riverside Park is located near the Riverwest and East Side neighborhoods. The park itself is approximately 25 acres in size. (10.2 ha) Riverside Park itself has a rich history, it is one of the three parks in Milwaukee that was made by Frederick Law Olmsted, who was responsible for making some of the most famous and iconic parks in America. The park is a mainly temperate forest, composed of mainly deciduous and broadleaf trees. The Milwaukee River runs through the park, as well as the Oak Leaf Trail. The park has a wide variety of wildlife and is a migratory stop over site for many species. Many bird species live there, such as Great horned owls, Red-winged blackbirds, Downy woodpeckers, Magnolia warblers, and Nashville warblers. The park is also home to the Milwaukee Rotary Centennial Arboretum, a 40-acre (16.1 ha) Arboretum that was built on a former Brownfield land. There is a restored Oak savanna in the arboretum, one of the most endangered habitats in the United States. It is one of twenty two US Forest Service dedicated "Children's Forests", meaning the park has a specific focus of educating children and families, while preserving the natural habitat.

In 2007, Wisconsin's largest solar array was the 44.4 kW array on the Urban Ecology Center in Milwaukee.

== Notable associates ==
Wisconsin State Senator Nikiya Harris was formerly a special events coordinator and membership manager for the Center.
