= Polly W. Beal =

American politician

Polly W. Beal (born March 1, 1942) is a former member of the Wisconsin State Assembly.

== Biography ==
Beal was born on March 1, 1942, in Racine, Wisconsin. She graduated from Boston University. Beal is married with three children and has served as director of the Skylight Opera Theatre in Milwaukee, Wisconsin.

== Political career ==
Beal was a member of the Assembly in 1993. She is a Republican.
