= Annette Polly Williams =

American politician

Member of the Wisconsin State Assembly
- In office January 4, 1993 – January 3, 2011
- Preceded by: Alberta Darling
- Succeeded by: Elizabeth M. Coggs
- Constituency: 10th District
- In office January 7, 1985 – January 4, 1993
- Preceded by: Peggy Krusick
- Succeeded by: G. Spencer Coggs
- Constituency: 17th District
- In office January 3, 1983 – January 7, 1985
- Preceded by: Gus Menos
- Succeeded by: Gus Menos
- Constituency: 11th District
- In office January 5, 1981 – January 3, 1983
- Preceded by: Walter L. Ward Jr.
- Succeeded by: Joseph Czarnezki
- Constituency: 17th District

Personal details
- Born: January 10, 1937 Belzoni, Mississippi, U.S.
- Died: November 9, 2014 (aged 77) Milwaukee, Wisconsin, U.S.
- Party: Democratic

Annette Polly Williams (January 10, 1937 – November 9, 2014) was an American counselor, clerical worker and politician from Milwaukee who served 10 terms as a Democratic Party member of the Wisconsin State Assembly, representing her assembly district from her election in 1980 until January 3, 2011.

== Background ==
Williams was born in Belzoni, Mississippi, in 1937 and graduated from North Division High School, attended Milwaukee Area Technical College from 1971–73, then went on to earn a BS degree from the University of Wisconsin–Milwaukee in 1975. After working as a mental health assistant, counselor, cashier, clerk, keypunch operator, and typist, while raising four children. she was elected to the Assembly in 1980 and became a full-time legislator.

== Politics ==
Williams was active in civic affairs, serving on the board or advisory council of such organizations as Urban Day School, Inner City Council on Alcoholism, S.E. Wisconsin Health Systems Agency, Wisconsin Black Women's Network, Central City Bicycle Safety Program, Family Services of Milwaukee, and the Wisconsin Black Women's Assembly. In 1975, she became secretary of the Northside [Milwaukee] unit of the Democratic Party of Wisconsin, moving up to First Vice-President in 1977; and she served as a delegate to various state Democratic conventions and on committees for the state and congressional district units of the party. In 1975, she was also appointed to the Wisconsin State Equal Rights Council, where she would serve until 1980.

In 1980 she won the Democratic nomination in what was then the 17th Assembly district by a vote of 1291 to 762, unseating four-term incumbent Walter L. Ward Jr.; and was unopposed in the general election. She was assigned to the standing committees on commerce and consumer affairs; on aging, women and minorities; on consumer and commercial credit; on education; and on small business and economic development. In May 2010, Williams announced she would not seek reelection. She was succeeded by Elizabeth M. Coggs (D-WI).

=== School choice ===
Williams was the author of the United States' first school choice legislation, approving school choice in 1989, and expanding the program to include religious schools five years later. She lectured at institutions including Harvard, Yale, Marquette, Stanford, and Johns Hopkins universities. From 1990–97, she earned some $163,000 in honoraria and expenses, far more than any other legislator in Wisconsin. The legislation brought Williams national fame, but she began to disown both the choice program and its supporters. Williams later said Michael Joyce of the Lynde and Harry Bradley Foundation and other school choice proponents wanted to expand the program to middle-class families by ending the income limits ("Joyce wanted to make it universal") and called it "a Catholic program". She accused choice and voucher proponents of exploiting black parents and children, saying "I haven't changed. The people around me have changed." "I don't agree with the way things are going at all", she said in an interview in 2011. "It's no longer the program that I supported at first."

== Awards and honors ==
She received such awards as UW-Milwaukee Lifetime Achievement Award, UW-Milwaukee Alumni Association's Distinguished Alumnus, National Black Caucus of State Legislators President's Award for Distinguished Service, and she was named by The New York Times as one of "Thirteen Innovators Who Changed Education in the 20th Century".

== Death ==
Williams died on November 9, 2014, in Milwaukee, aged 77. The cause of death was not disclosed.
