= Marcia P. Coggs =

American politician

Marcia Coggs

Member of the Wisconsin State Assembly
- In office January 3, 1977 – January 4, 1993
- Preceded by: Lloyd Barbee
- Succeeded by: Antonio R. Riley
- Constituency: 18th District (1977-1983); 12th District (1983-1985); 18th District (1985-1993)

Personal details
- Born: April 5, 1928 Kansas City, Kansas
- Died: December 9, 2003 (aged 75) Milwaukee, Wisconsin
- Party: Democratic
- Spouse: Isaac N. Coggs (m. 1952; died 1973)

Marcia Coggs (born Marcia Priscilla Young, April 5, 1928 – December 9, 2003) was an American Democratic politician.

Born in Kansas City, Kansas, Coggs graduated from University of Wisconsin–Milwaukee. Coggs served in the Wisconsin State Assembly 1977-1993 from Milwaukee, Wisconsin. Coggs died at St. Mary's Hospital, in Milwaukee, Wisconsin from a long illness on December 9, 2003.

== Background ==
Marcia Priscilla Young was born in Kansas City, Kansas, the fifth of nine children. Her parents, Harold Clinton Young II and Elizabeth Patton Young, ran a printing business. Her grandfather, D.J. Young, one of the earliest pioneers of the Church of God in Christ. She attended the Milwaukee State Teachers College from 1955–56 and earned a Bachelor of Science degree from the University of Wisconsin-Milwaukee.

In 1952 she married Isaac N. Coggs, with whom she had four children including politician Elizabeth M. Coggs. The same year they were married, Isaac Coggs successfully ran for a seat in the Wisconsin State Assembly where he served for 12 years. They were married until his death in 1973.

== Career ==
Before entering politics, Marcia Coggs worked for 13 years for the former Milwaukee County Children's Home. She unsuccessfully ran for office in the Wisconsin State Senate in 1960. She successfully ran for Wisconsin State Assembly in 1976, just three years after the death of her husband. Early in her legislative career she was quoted as saying, "You cannot legislate the heart, but you can legislate laws. My mission is to work for social change. Period. When I say social change, that is self-explanatory - human needs."

Coggs was the first African-American woman elected to the state assembly. In addition, she was the first black person to sit on the state Legislature's Joint Finance Committee, serving from 1987 until 1993. She served on Health and Human Services Committee the entire time she was in office, and many of the committees on which she served were focused on children, families, and employment.
