= Elizabeth M. Coggs =

American politician (born 1956)

Elizabeth Coggs

Member of the Wisconsin State Assembly from the 10th district
- In office January 3, 2011 – January 7, 2013
- Preceded by: Annette Polly Williams
- Succeeded by: Sandy Pasch

Personal details
- Born: December 4, 1956 (age 69) Belzoni, Mississippi, U.S.
- Party: Democratic
- Spouse: Wendell Jones (div. 2008)
- Children: 3
- Parents: Isaac N. Coggs (father); Marcia Priscilla Young Coggs (mother)
- Relatives: Spencer Coggs (cousin)
- Website: Twitter

Elizabeth Monette "Beth" Coggs (born December 4, 1956) is an American community organizer and Democratic politician from Milwaukee, Wisconsin. She served one term in the Wisconsin State Assembly, representing the 10th Assembly district from 2011 to 2013. She previously served 12 years on the Milwaukee County Board of Supervisors, from 1988 to 2010. Both of her parents, Isaac N. Coggs and Marcia P. Coggs, also served in the State Assembly. Her cousin, Spencer Coggs, also served in the Assembly and the Wisconsin Senate.

She was previously known as Elizabeth Coggs-Jones during her marriage to Wendell Jones.

== Background ==
Elizabeth Monette Coggs was born in Milwaukee, Wisconsin. Coggs is a lifelong Milwaukee resident. Her father, Isaac Newton Coggs, was one of the third African-Americans elected to the State Assembly (in 1952) and the first African American elected to the Milwaukee County Board of Supervisors (in 1964). Her mother, Marcia Priscilla Young Coggs, was the first African-American woman elected to Wisconsin State Assembly (in 1976). Elizabeth graduated from Lincoln High School, and earned a Bachelor of Arts degree, majoring in African-American studies at the University of Wisconsin-Milwaukee.

== Politics ==
=== Milwaukee County Board ===
She was first elected a county supervisor in 1988, being re-elected from 1992 to 2008. As of 2010 she was the longest-serving member of the County Board.

=== State Assembly ===
In 2010 she defeated two other candidates, Stephanie Findley and Sherman Hill to win the primary election for the State Assembly, in the 10th District after Annette Polly Williams announced that she was not running for election.

Her only opponent was independent Ieshuh Griffin, who attracted national attention (including an appearance on The Daily Show) for eventually unsuccessful efforts to label herself as "NOT the 'whiteman's bitch'" (utilizing a state rule that allows independent candidates to use a five-word statement of purpose on the ballot to categorize themselves) on the election ballot. Coggs received 15,874 votes; Griffin 1223.

2010 See also: Wisconsin State Assembly elections, 2010 Coggs defeated Independent Ieshuh Griffin in the November 2 general election. Coggs was opposed in the primary election by Stephanie Findley and Sherman Hill.[7]

Wisconsin State Assembly, District 10 General Election (2010)

Candidates Votes

- Elizabeth Coggs (D)

15,874

- Ieshuh Griffin (I) 1,223

Wisconsin State Assembly, District 10 Democratic primary (2010) Candidates Votes Percent

- Elizabeth M. Coggs (D)

2,613 66.45%

- Stephanie Findley (D) 1,039 26.42%
- Sherman L. Hill (D) 268 6.82%

Campaign themes According to Coggs' campaign website, her focus is on faith, hope and harmony.[8]

Committee assignments 2011–2012 In the 2011-2012 legislative session, Coggs served on these committees:

- Aging and Long-Term Care Committee
- Consumer Protection Committee
- Urban and Local Affairs Committee

=== State Senate ===
In 2012, instead of running for re-election to the Assembly, she chose to run for the vacant Sixth Senate district, previously held by her cousin Spencer Coggs. Her July 2012 call to the mostly-black voters at an inner-city candidate forum to "vote for someone who looks like you" led to accusations that she was attacking Assemblywoman Sandy Pasch, the only white candidate in the race to replace Coggs in her 10th Assembly district seat (Pasch's current seat was eliminated by the Republican-led legislature during the most recent redistricting, and she had moved into the new 10th district). All her opponents were African-American, but several African-American candidates at the forum decried Coggs' remarks as racist. None of Pasch's opponents had held elected office. "I don't think anyone should vote for anyone on account of their skin color", opponent Ieshuh Griffin said of Coggs' remarks. "It's not about color."

Coggs' predecessor, Polly Williams, describing Pasch as "a White suburban woman" who "can't win in her own district", expressed concern that inner-city seats such as hers could be lost to white Democrats due to alleged machinations by "non-Black forces from outside the community". She lost the Democratic primary (tantamount to election in this inner-city seat) to County Supervisor Nikiya Harris. The 10th district Democratic nomination was taken by Pasch, with over 60% of the vote.

== Personal life ==
Elizabeth Coggs was married to Wendell Jones (they divorced in 2008), and is the mother of Priscilla, Chloé and Devona. She belongs to the Church of God in Christ. Another cousin, Leon Young, was a state legislator.

Wisconsin State Assembly
| Preceded by Annette Polly Williams | Member of the Wisconsin State Assembly from the 10th district January 3, 2011 – January 7, 2013 | Succeeded by Sandy Pasch |
