= Milwaukee County Board of Supervisors =

Agency overview
- Formed: 1835
- Jurisdiction: Milwaukee County, Wisconsin
- Headquarters: Milwaukee, Wisconsin
- Agency executives: Marcelia Nicholson, Chairwoman; Steven Shea, 1st Vice Chair; Priscilla Coggs-Jones, 2nd Vice Chair
- Website: milwaukee.gov

The Milwaukee County Board of Supervisors is the legislative branch of the government of Milwaukee County, Wisconsin, United States. Supervisors are elected to the board in nonpartisan elections. There are 18 supervisors. The county board has several committees and votes on issues involving the county, such as the budget.

== Board members ==
District	Supervisor
1	Anne O'Connor
2	Willie Johnson, Jr.
3	Sheldon Wasserman
4	Jack Eckblad
5	Sequanna Taylor
6	Shawn Rolland
7	Felesia Martin
8	Steven Shea, 1st Vice Chair
9	Patti Logsdon
10	Marcelia Nicholson, Chairwoman
11	Kathleen Vincent
12	Juan Miguel Martinez
13	Priscilla Coggs-Jones, 2nd Vice Chair
14	Caroline Gomez-Tom
15	Sky Capriolo
16	Justin Bielinski
17	Steve Taylor
18	Deanna Alexander

== History ==
=== Prestige ===
As of 1960, membership on the Board was considered more desirable than membership in the Wisconsin State Assembly, and incumbent legislators would often seek a position on the Board, resigning their legislative positions if they were victorious. By the early 21st century, this was no longer the case, and it was instead common for county supervisors to run for the legislature, even though Milwaukee County supervisors were paid fractionally more than the average salary for state legislators. Incumbent supervisors Elizabeth M. Coggs and Chris Larson were elected to the legislature, for example in 2010. An exception to this pattern was the case of Democratic State Representative David Cullen, who ran for and won a seat on the Board in early 2012, after a Republican legislature drastically redistricted his Assembly seat, where he had served for over two decades.

=== Pension controversy ===
Amidst a period of economic growth, in 1999, Milwaukee County was experiencing a problem with employee retention. Balancing local taxpayer pressures to not raise property taxes with the need to retain trained employees led the County's Human Resources Administrators to look at the County Pension fund which, invested in a successful stock market, had flourished.

County administrators, after consulting with the actuarial firm, Mercer and Associates, recommended that the County Board's Pension Study Committee pass approval of a controversial "backdrop benefit" employee pension plan designed for employee retention. Once passed, the plan could be advanced to the full County Board. In 2000, the head of the County's Human Resources department testified that, according to the Milwaukee's only daily newspaper, the "backdrop benefit cost estimate was done. County pension consultants from Mercer Inc. do not speak up, though say later they knew the remark was inaccurate." Administrators explained that the proposal was "revenue neutral" and that proceeds from investments would cover any expenses that could occur. After advancing to the full County Board, it was passed.

In 2002, a conservative based group with ties to the Republican party and aided by conservative talk radio show hosts on radio station WTMJ, launched a recall campaign against the Democratic County Executive which they claimed he masterminded for personal benefit despite the fact that he publicly signed a waiver of all backdrop benefits. Their claims were supported by a then little known State Representative, Scott Walker, who blamed the County Executive for the mess. After sufficient petitions were certified to force a recall, the County Executive chose to step down rather than face an election. In that same year, seven county board members who voted for the pension deal were recalled from office.

Pro-recall activists, having earned the right to special election to fill the vacated seat, supported Scott Walker as County Executive.

In 2009, a civil lawsuit was filed by Milwaukee County against Mercer Human Resource Consulting, Inc., a global financial-advice firm. In an out of court settlement, the County received $45 million from Mercer. Supervisors who had retained their seats despite recall attempts declared vindication.

=== 2013 restructuring ===
The same group that advocated for the recalls, called for reforms to the current county board and in May 2013, the Wisconsin Legislature passed a bill that would mandate a referendum that cut the supervisors salaries, ended health insurance and pension benefits, reduced the board's operating budget, and reduced the Milwaukee County Board of Supervisors terms of office from four-years to two-years.

2022 Re-Establishment of the Youth Commission

In 2022, the Milwaukee County Board of Supervisors voted to establish the Milwaukee County Youth Commission. The Milwaukee County Youth Commission was created to ensure that young people have a meaningful role in shaping the future of their communities. By giving youth a formal seat at the table in local government, the commission empowers the next generation of leaders to speak up on issues that directly impact their lives. It serves as a bridge between Milwaukee County officials and the diverse youth population they serve.
