= 93rd Wisconsin Legislature =

Wisconsin legislative term for 1997–1998

| ← | 92nd | 94th | → |
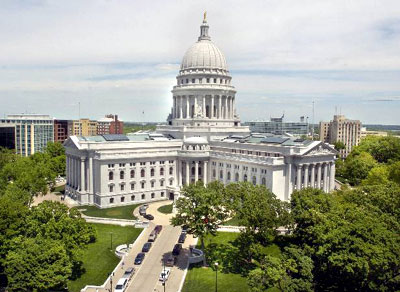
- Wisconsin State Capitol

Overview
- Legislative body: Wisconsin Legislature
- Meeting place: Wisconsin State Capitol
- Term: January 6, 1997 – January 4, 1999
- Election: November 5, 1996

Senate
- Members: 33
- Senate President: Fred Risser (D) ^{until Apr. 21, 1998}; Brian Rude (R) ^{after Apr. 21, 1998}
- President pro tempore: Gwen Moore (D) ^{until Apr. 21, 1998}; Alan Lasee (R) ^{after Apr. 21, 1998}
- Party control: Democratic ^{until Apr. 20, 1998}; Republican ^{after Apr. 21, 1998}

Assembly
- Members: 99
- Assembly Speaker: Ben Brancel (R) ^{until Nov. 2, 1997}; Scott R. Jensen (R) ^{after Nov. 4, 1997}
- Speaker pro tempore: Stephen Freese (R)
- Party control: Republican

Sessions
- Regular: January 6, 1997 – January 4, 1999

Special sessions
- Apr. 1998 Spec.: April 21, 1998 – May 21, 1998

The Ninety-Third Wisconsin Legislature convened from January 6, 1997, to January 4, 1999, in regular session, and also convened in an April 1998 special session.

This was the third consecutive session in which partisan control of the Senate changed during the legislative term.

Senators representing even-numbered districts were newly elected for this session and were serving the first two years of a four-year term. Assembly members were elected to a two-year term. Assembly members and even-numbered senators were elected in the general election of November 5, 1996. Senators representing odd-numbered districts were serving the third and fourth year of a four-year term, having been elected in the general election of November 8, 1994.

The governor of Wisconsin during this entire term was Republican Tommy Thompson, of Juneau County, serving the second two years of his third four-year term, having won re-election in the 1994 Wisconsin gubernatorial election.

== Major events ==
- January 20, 1997: Second inauguration of Bill Clinton as President of the United States.
- January 26, 1997: The Green Bay Packers won Super Bowl XXXI.
- November 13, 1997: Wisconsin state senator Lynn Adelman was confirmed as United States District Judge for the Eastern District of Wisconsin.
- September 10, 1998: Wisconsin Supreme Court justice Janine P. Geske resigned. Governor Tommy Thompson immediately appointed David Prosser Jr. to succeed her.
- November 3, 1998: 1998 United States general election:
  - Tommy Thompson (R) re-elected Governor of Wisconsin, the first person to win four terms as governor of Wisconsin.
  - Russ Feingold (D) re-elected United States senator from Wisconsin.
  - Wisconsin voters ratified two amendments to the state constitution:
    - Creating a right to keep and bear arms.
    - Changing sheriff terms to four years, allowing sheriffs to hold other nonpartisan offices, and allowing the legislature to call special elections to fill sheriff vacancies.
- December 19, 1998: The United States House of Representatives voted to impeach U.S. President Bill Clinton for perjury and obstruction of justice.

== Major legislation ==
- October 13, 1997: An Act relating to: state finances and appropriations, constituting the executive budget act of the 1997 legislature, and making appropriations, 1997 Act 27. Vetoed in part.

== Party summary ==
=== Senate summary ===
Senate partisan composition Democratic: 17 seats Republican: 16 seats

| | Party (Shading indicates majority caucus) | | Total | |
| | Dem. | Rep. | Total | Vacant |
|---|---|---|---|---|
| End of previous Legislature | 17 | 16 | 33 | 0 |
| Start of Reg. Session | 17 | 16 | 33 | 0 |
| From Dec. 23, 1997 (Note: Democrat Lynn Adelman (28th District) resigned after he was confirmed as a United States district judge.) | 16 | 16 | 32 | 1 |
| From Apr. 20, 1998 (Note: Republican Mary Lazich (28th District) was sworn in to replace Lynn Adelman.) | 16 | 17 | 33 | 0 |
| Final voting share | 48.48% | 51.52% | | |
| Beginning of the next Legislature | 17 | 16 | 33 | 0 |

=== Assembly summary ===
Assembly partisan composition Democratic: 47 seats Republican: 52 seats

| | Party (Shading indicates majority caucus) | | Total | |
| | Dem. | Rep. | Total | Vacant |
|---|---|---|---|---|
| End of previous Legislature | 47 | 51 | 98 | 1 |
| Start of Reg. Session | 47 | 52 | 99 | 0 |
| From Nov. 2, 1997 (Note: Republican Speaker Ben Brancel (42nd District) resigned after being appointed secretary of the Wisconsin Department of Agriculture, Trade and Consumer Protection.) | 47 | 51 | 98 | 1 |
| From Dec. 7, 1997 (Note: Democrat James A. Rutkowski (82nd District) resigned to accept appointment to a state commission.) | 46 | 51 | 97 | 2 |
| From Jan. 20, 1998 (Note: Republican Joan Wade Spillner (42nd District) was sworn in to replace Ben Brancel.) | 46 | 52 | 98 | 1 |
| From Apr. 15, 1998 (Note: Republican Jeff Stone (82nd District) was sworn in to replace James A. Rutkowski.) | 46 | 53 | 99 | 0 |
| From Apr. 20, 1998 (Note: Republican Mary Lazich (84th District) resigned after her election to the state senate.) | 46 | 52 | 98 | 1 |
| From Aug. 1, 1998 (Note: Democrat Barbara Linton (74th District) resigned.) | 45 | 52 | 97 | 2 |
| Final voting share | 46.39% | 53.61% | | |
| Beginning of the next Legislature | 44 | 55 | 99 | 0 |

== Sessions ==
- Regular session: January 6, 1997 – January 4, 1999
- Apr. 1998 special session: April 21, 1998 – May 21, 1998

== Leadership ==
=== Senate leadership ===
- President of the Senate: Fred Risser (D–Madison) (until Apr. 21, 1998)
  - Brian Rude (R–Coon Valley) (after Apr. 21, 1998)
- President pro tempore: Gwen Moore (D–Milwaukee) (until Apr. 21, 1998)
  - Alan Lasee (R–Rockland) (after Apr. 21, 1998)

==== Senate majority leadership ====
- Majority Leader: Charles Chvala (D–Madison) (until Apr. 21, 1998)
  - Michael G. Ellis (R–Neenah) (after Apr. 21, 1998)
- Assistant Majority Leader: Rodney C. Moen (D–Whitehall) (until Apr. 21, 1998)
  - Margaret Farrow (R–Elm Grove) (after Apr. 21, 1998)

==== Senate minority leadership ====
- Minority Leader: Michael G. Ellis (R–Neenah) (until Apr. 21, 1998)
  - Charles Chvala (D–Madison) (after Apr. 21, 1998)
- Assistant Minority Leader: Brian Rude (R–Coon Valley) (until Apr. 21, 1998)
  - Fred Risser (D–Madison) (after Apr. 21, 1998)

=== Assembly leadership ===
- Speaker of the Assembly: Ben Brancel (R–Douglas) (until Nov. 2, 1997)
  - Scott R. Jensen (R–Waukesha) (after Nov. 4, 1997)
- Speaker pro tempore: Stephen Freese (R–Jamestown)

==== Assembly majority leadership ====
- Majority Leader: Steven Foti (R–Oconomowoc)
- Assistant Majority Leader: Bonnie Ladwig (R–Caledonia)

==== Assembly minority leadership ====
- Minority Leader: Walter Kunicki (D–Milwaukee) (until May 26, 1998)
  - Shirley Krug (D–Milwaukee) (after May 26, 1998)
- Assistant Minority Leader: Marlin Schneider (D–Wisconsin Rapids)

== Members ==
=== Members of the Senate ===
Members of the Senate for the Ninety-Third Wisconsin Legislature:

Senate partisan representation Democratic: 17 seats Republican: 16 seats

| Dist. | Senator | Party | Age (1997) | Home | First elected |
|---|---|---|---|---|---|
| 01 | Alan Lasee | Rep. | 59 | Rockland, Brown County | 1977 |
| 02 | Robert Cowles | Rep. | 46 | Green Bay, Brown County | 1987 |
| 03 | Brian Burke | Dem. | 38 | Milwaukee, Milwaukee County | 1988 |
| 04 | Gwen Moore | Dem. | 45 | Milwaukee, Milwaukee County | 1992 |
| 05 | Peggy Rosenzweig | Rep. | 60 | Wauwatosa, Milwaukee County | 1993 |
| 06 | Gary George | Dem. | 42 | Milwaukee, Milwaukee County | 1980 |
| 07 | Richard Grobschmidt | Dem. | 48 | South Milwaukee, Milwaukee County | 1995 |
| 08 | Alberta Darling | Rep. | 52 | River Hills, Milwaukee County | 1992 |
| 09 | Calvin Potter | Dem. | 51 | Kohler, Sheboygan County | 1990 |
| 10 | Alice Clausing | Dem. | 52 | Menomonie, Dunn County | 1992 |
| 11 | Joanne Huelsman | Rep. | 58 | Waukesha, Waukesha County | 1990 |
| 12 | Roger Breske | Dem. | 58 | Elderon, Marathon County | 1990 |
| 13 | Scott Fitzgerald | Rep. | 33 | Juneau, Dodge County | 1994 |
| 14 | Robert T. Welch | Rep. | 38 | Marion, Waushara County | 1995 |
| 15 | Timothy Weeden | Rep. | 45 | Beloit, Rock County | 1987 |
| 16 | Charles Chvala | Dem. | 42 | Madison, Dane County | 1984 |
| 17 | Dale Schultz | Rep. | 43 | Richland Center, Richland County | 1991 |
| 18 | Carol Buettner | Rep. | 48 | Oshkosh, Winnebago County | 1987 |
| 19 | Michael G. Ellis | Rep. | 55 | Neenah, Winnebago County | 1982 |
| 20 | Mary Panzer | Rep. | 45 | West Bend, Washington County | 1993 |
| 21 | Kimberly Plache | Dem. | 35 | Racine, Racine County | 1996 |
| 22 | Bob Wirch | Dem. | 53 | Kenosha, Kenosha County | 1996 |
| 23 | David Zien | Rep. | 46 | Eau Claire, Eau Claire County | 1993 |
| 24 | Kevin Shibilski | Dem. | 35 | Stevens Point, Portage County | 1995 |
| 25 | Robert Jauch | Dem. | 51 | Poplar, Douglas County | 1986 |
| 26 | Fred Risser | Dem. | 69 | Madison, Dane County | 1962 |
| 27 | Joe Wineke | Dem. | 39 | Verona, Dane County | 1993 |
| 28 | Lynn Adelman (res. Dec. 23, 1997) | Dem. | 57 | Mukwonago, Waukesha County | 1976 |
| 28 | Mary Lazich (from Apr. 20, 1998) | Rep. | 45 | New Berlin, Waukesha County | 1998 |
| 29 | Russ Decker | Dem. | 43 | Schofield, Marathon County | 1990 |
| 30 | Gary Drzewiecki | Rep. | 42 | Pulaski, Brown County | 1992 |
| 31 | Rodney C. Moen | Dem. | 59 | Whitehall, Trempealeau County | 1982 |
| 32 | Brian Rude | Rep. | 41 | Coon Valley, Vernon County | 1984 |
| 33 | Margaret Farrow | Rep. | 62 | Elm Grove, Waukesha County | 1989 |

=== Members of the Assembly ===
Members of the Assembly for the Ninety-Third Wisconsin Legislature:

Assembly partisan representation Democratic: 47 seats Republican: 52 seats

| Senate Dist. | Dist. | Representative | Party | Age (1997) | Home | First Elected |
|---|---|---|---|---|---|---|
| 01 | 01 | David E. Hutchison | Rep. | 53 | Red River | 1994 |
| 01 | 02 | Frank Lasee | Rep. | 35 | Ledgeview | 1994 |
| 01 | 03 | Alvin Ott | Rep. | 47 | Brillion | 1986 |
| 02 | 04 | Mark A. Green | Rep. | 36 | Green Bay | 1992 |
| 02 | 05 | William N. Vander Loop | Dem. | 64 | Kaukauna | 1990 |
| 02 | 06 | John Ainsworth | Rep. | 56 | Waukechon | 1990 |
| 03 | 07 | Peter Bock | Dem. | 48 | Milwaukee | 1986 |
| 03 | 08 | Walter Kunicki | Dem. | 38 | Milwaukee | 1980 |
| 03 | 09 | Tim Carpenter | Dem. | 36 | Milwaukee | 1984 |
| 04 | 10 | Annette Polly Williams | Dem. | 59 | Milwaukee | 1980 |
| 04 | 11 | Johnnie E. Morris-Tatum | Dem. | 45 | Milwaukee | 1992 |
| 04 | 12 | Shirley Krug | Dem. | 38 | Milwaukee | 1984 |
| 05 | 13 | David Cullen | Dem. | 36 | Milwaukee | 1990 |
| 05 | 14 | Scott Walker | Rep. | 29 | Wauwatosa | 1993 |
| 05 | 15 | Tony Staskunas | Dem. | 35 | West Allis | 1996 |
| 06 | 16 | Leon Young | Dem. | 29 | Milwaukee | 1992 |
| 06 | 17 | Spencer Coggs | Dem. | 47 | Milwaukee | 1982 |
| 06 | 18 | Antonio R. Riley | Dem. | 33 | Milwaukee | 1992 |
| 07 | 19 | Barbara Notestein | Dem. | 47 | Milwaukee | 1984 |
| 07 | 20 | Rosemary Potter | Dem. | 44 | Milwaukee | 1989 |
| 07 | 21 | Jeffrey Plale | Dem. | 28 | South Milwaukee | 1996 |
| 08 | 22 | Sheldon Wasserman | Dem. | 35 | Milwaukee | 1994 |
| 08 | 23 | John La Fave | Dem. | 47 | Brown Deer | 1992 |
| 08 | 24 | Suzanne Jeskewitz | Rep. | 54 | Menomonee Falls | 1996 |
| 09 | 25 | Bob Ziegelbauer | Dem. | 45 | Manitowoc | 1992 |
| 09 | 26 | James Baumgart | Dem. | 58 | Sheboygan | 1990 |
| 09 | 27 | Clifford Otte | Rep. | 63 | Sheboygan Falls | 1992 |
| 10 | 28 | Robert M. Dueholm | Dem. | 51 | Bone Lake | 1994 |
| 10 | 29 | Joe Plouff | Dem. | 46 | Menomonie | 1996 |
| 10 | 30 | Sheila Harsdorf | Rep. | 40 | River Falls | 1988 |
| 11 | 31 | Stephen Nass | Rep. | 44 | Whitewater | 1990 |
| 11 | 32 | Scott R. Jensen | Rep. | 36 | Waukesha | 1992 |
| 11 | 33 | Daniel P. Vrakas | Rep. | 41 | Hartland | 1990 |
| 12 | 34 | Joe Handrick | Rep. | 35 | Minocqua | 1994 |
| 12 | 35 | Thomas D. Ourada | Rep. | 38 | Antigo | 1984 |
| 12 | 36 | Lorraine Seratti | Rep. | 47 | Florence | 1992 |
| 13 | 37 | David W. Ward | Rep. | 43 | Fort Atkinson | 1992 |
| 13 | 38 | Steven Foti | Rep. | 38 | Oconomowoc | 1982 |
| 13 | 39 | Robert Goetsch | Rep. | 63 | Oak Grove | 1982 |
| 14 | 40 | William Lorge | Rep. | 36 | Deer Creek | 1988 |
| 14 | 41 | Luther Olsen | Rep. | 45 | Aurora | 1994 |
| 14 | 42 | Ben Brancel (res. Nov. 2, 1997) | Rep. | 46 | Douglas | 1986 |
| 14 | 42 | Joan Wade Spillner (from Jan. 20, 1998) | Rep. | 35 | Mecan | 1998 |
| 15 | 43 | Neal Kedzie | Rep. | 40 | La Grange | 1996 |
| 15 | 44 | Wayne W. Wood | Dem. | 66 | Janesville | 1976 |
| 15 | 45 | Judy Robson | Dem. | 57 | Beloit | 1987 |
| 16 | 46 | Tom Hebl | Dem. | 51 | Sun Prairie | 1996 |
| 16 | 47 | Eugene Hahn | Rep. | 67 | Springvale | 1990 |
| 16 | 48 | Doris Hanson | Dem. | 71 | McFarland | 1992 |
| 17 | 49 | David A. Brandemuehl | Rep. | 65 | Mount Ida | 1986 |
| 17 | 50 | Sheryl Albers | Rep. | 42 | Westfield | 1991 |
| 17 | 51 | Stephen Freese | Rep. | 36 | Dodgeville | 1990 |
| 18 | 52 | John P. Dobyns | Rep. | 52 | Fond du Lac | 1992 |
| 18 | 53 | Carol Owens | Rep. | 65 | Nekimi | 1992 |
| 18 | 54 | Gregg Underheim | Rep. | 46 | Oshkosh | 1987 |
| 19 | 55 | Dean Kaufert | Rep. | 39 | Neenah | 1990 |
| 19 | 56 | Judith Klusman | Rep. | 40 | Clayton | 1988 |
| 19 | 57 | Steve Wieckert | Rep. | 42 | Appleton | 1996 |
| 20 | 58 | Michael A. Lehman | Rep. | 53 | Hartford | 1988 |
| 20 | 59 | Glenn Grothman | Rep. | 41 | West Bend | 1993 |
| 20 | 60 | Timothy Hoven | Rep. | 33 | Port Washington | 1994 |
| 21 | 61 | Robert L. Turner | Dem. | 49 | Racine | 1990 |
| 21 | 62 | John Lehman | Dem. | 51 | Racine | 1996 |
| 21 | 63 | Bonnie Ladwig | Rep. | 57 | Caledonia | 1992 |
| 22 | 64 | James Kreuser | Dem. | 41 | Kenosha | 1993 |
| 22 | 65 | John Steinbrink | Dem. | 47 | Pleasant Prairie | 1996 |
| 22 | 66 | Cloyd A. Porter | Rep. | 61 | Burlington | 1972 |
| 23 | 67 | Tom Sykora | Rep. | 50 | Eagle Point | 1996 |
| 23 | 68 | Chuck Schafer | Rep. | 33 | Lafayette | 1996 |
| 23 | 69 | Robert K. Zukowski | Rep. | 66 | Reseburg | 1992 |
| 24 | 70 | Donald W. Hasenohrl | Dem. | 61 | Pittsville | 1974 |
| 24 | 71 | William Murat | Dem. | 39 | Stevens Point | 1994 |
| 24 | 72 | Marlin Schneider | Dem. | 54 | Wisconsin Rapids | 1970 |
| 25 | 73 | Frank Boyle | Dem. | 51 | Summit | 1986 |
| 25 | 74 | Barbara Linton (res. Aug. 1, 1998) | Dem. | 44 | Ashland | 1986 |
| 25 | 74 | --Vacant from Aug. 1, 1998-- | | | | |
| 25 | 75 | Mary Hubler | Dem. | 44 | Rice Lake | 1984 |
| 26 | 76 | Rebecca Young | Dem. | 62 | Madison | 1984 |
| 26 | 77 | Spencer Black | Dem. | 46 | Madison | 1984 |
| 26 | 78 | Tammy Baldwin | Dem. | 34 | Madison | 1992 |
| 27 | 79 | Rick Skindrud | Rep. | 52 | Primrose | 1993 |
| 27 | 80 | Mike Powers | Rep. | 34 | Albany | 1994 |
| 27 | 81 | David Travis | Dem. | 48 | Madison | 1978 |
| 28 | 82 | James A. Rutkowski (res. Dec. 7, 1997) | Dem. | 54 | Greenfield | 1970 |
| 28 | 82 | Jeff Stone (from Apr. 15, 1998) | Rep. | 37 | Greenfield | 1998 |
| 28 | 83 | Scott Gunderson | Rep. | 40 | Waterford | 1994 |
| 28 | 84 | Mary Lazich (res. Apr. 20, 1998) | Rep. | 44 | New Berlin | 1992 |
| 28 | 84 | --Vacant from Apr. 20, 1998-- | | | | |
| 29 | 85 | Gregory Huber | Dem. | 40 | Wausau | 1988 |
| 29 | 86 | Thomas J. Springer | Dem. | 28 | Mosinee | 1991 |
| 29 | 87 | Martin Reynolds | Dem. | 46 | Ladysmith | 1990 |
| 30 | 88 | Carol Kelso | Rep. | 51 | Green Bay | 1988 |
| 30 | 89 | John Gard | Rep. | 33 | Peshtigo | 1987 |
| 30 | 90 | John Joseph Ryba | Dem. | 67 | Green Bay | 1992 |
| 31 | 91 | Barbara Gronemus | Dem. | 65 | Whitehall | 1982 |
| 31 | 92 | Terry Musser | Rep. | 49 | Irving | 1984 |
| 31 | 93 | Robin Kreibich | Rep. | 37 | Eau Claire | 1992 |
| 32 | 94 | Michael Huebsch | Rep. | 32 | Onalaska | 1994 |
| 32 | 95 | Mark Meyer | Dem. | 33 | La Crosse | 1992 |
| 32 | 96 | DuWayne Johnsrud | Rep. | 53 | Eastman | 1984 |
| 33 | 97 | Peggy Krusick | Dem. | 40 | Milwaukee | 1983 |
| 33 | 98 | Marc C. Duff | Rep. | 35 | New Berlin | 1988 |
| 33 | 99 | Frank Urban | Rep. | 66 | Brookfield | 1989 |

== Employees ==
=== Senate employees ===
- Chief Clerk: Donald J. Schneider
- Sergeant-at-Arms: Jon H. Hochkammer

=== Assembly employees ===
- Chief Clerk: Charles R. Sanders
- Sergeant-at-Arms: John A. Scocos
