= 94th Wisconsin Legislature =

Wisconsin legislative term for 1999–2000

←	93rd	95th	→
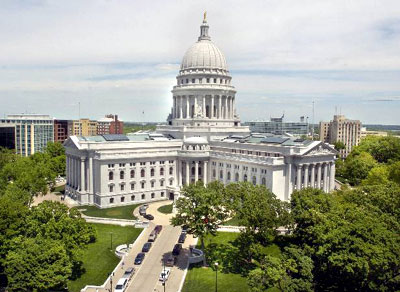
- Wisconsin State Capitol

Overview
- Legislative body: Wisconsin Legislature
- Meeting place: Wisconsin State Capitol
- Term: January 4, 1999 – January 1, 2001
- Election: November 3, 1998

Senate
- Members: 33
- Senate President: Fred Risser (D)
- President pro tempore: Gary R. George (D)
- Party control: Democratic

Assembly
- Members: 99
- Assembly Speaker: Scott R. Jensen (R)
- Speaker pro tempore: Stephen Freese (R)
- Party control: Republican

Sessions
- Regular: January 4, 1999 – January 3, 2001

Special sessions
- Oct. 1999 Spec.: October 27, 1999 – November 11, 1999
- May 2000 Spec.: May 4, 2000 – May 9, 2000

The Ninety-Fourth Wisconsin Legislature convened from January 4, 1999, to January 3, 2001, in regular session, and also convened in two special sessions.

Senators representing odd-numbered districts were newly elected for this session and were serving the first two years of a four-year term. Assembly members were elected to a two-year term. Assembly members and odd-numbered senators were elected in the general election of November 3, 1998. Senators representing even-numbered districts were serving the third and fourth year of a four-year term, having been elected in the general election of November 5, 1996.

The governor of Wisconsin during this entire term was Republican Tommy Thompson, of Juneau County, serving the first two years of his fourth four-year term, having won re-election in the 1998 Wisconsin gubernatorial election.

== Major events ==
- January 4, 1999: Fourth inauguration of Tommy Thompson as Governor of Wisconsin.
- February 12, 1999: In the United States Senate, the impeachment trial of U.S. President Bill Clinton ended with a verdict of "not guilty".
- March 29, 1999: The Dow Jones Industrial Average closed above 10,000 for the first time.
- April 6, 1999: 1999 Wisconsin Spring election:
  - Wisconsin voters ratified an amendment to the state constitution which adjusted what state gambling proceeds could be used for.
- May 1, 2000: The Wisconsin politics news website Wispolitics.com was launched.
- September 7, 2000: Wisconsin Supreme Court justice Donald W. Steinmetz resigned. Wisconsin governor Tommy Thompson appointed Diane S. Sykes to succeed him.
- November 7, 2000: 2000 United States general election:
  - The 2000 United States presidential election was too close to call, and hinged on a recount in Florida.
  - Herb Kohl (D) was re-elected as United States senator from Wisconsin.
- December 12, 2000: The United States Supreme Court ruled in the case Bush v. Gore, stating that there was not enough time to set standards and conduct a fair recount, thus the recount must end. George W. Bush was therefore declared the winner of the 2000 United States presidential election.

== Major legislation ==
- October 28, 1999: An Act relating to: state finances and appropriations, constituting the executive budget act of the 1999 legislature, 1999 Act 9. Vetoed in part.

== Party summary ==
=== Senate summary ===
Senate partisan composition Democratic: 17 seats Republican: 16 seats

	Party (Shading indicates majority caucus)		Total	
	Dem.	Rep.	Total	Vacant
End of previous Legislature	16	17	33	0
Start of Reg. Session	17	16	33	0
From May 25, 2000 (Note: Republican Brian Rude (32nd District) resigned.)	17	15	32	1
Final voting share	53.13%	46.88%		
Beginning of the next Legislature	18	15	33	0

=== Assembly summary ===
Assembly partisan composition Democratic: 45 seats Republican: 54 seats

	Party (Shading indicates majority caucus)		Total	
	Dem.	Rep.	Total	Vacant
End of previous Legislature	45	52	97	2
Start of Reg. Session	44	55	99	0
From Jan. 29, 1999 (Note: Republican Thomas D. Ourada (35th District) resigned.)	44	54	98	1
From May 12, 1999 (Note: Democrat Sarah Waukau (35th District) was sworn in to replace Thomas D. Ourada.)	45	54	99	0
Final voting share	45.45%	54.55%		
Beginning of the next Legislature	43	56	99	0

== Sessions ==
- Regular session: January 4, 1999 – January 3, 2001
- Oct. 1999 special session: October 27, 1999 – November 11, 1999
- May 2000 special session: May 4, 2000 – May 9, 2000

== Leadership ==
=== Senate leadership ===
- President of the Senate: Fred Risser (D–Madison)
- President pro tempore: Gary R. George (D–Milwaukee)

==== Senate majority leadership ====
- Majority Leader: Charles Chvala (D–Madison)
- Assistant Majority Leader: Rodney C. Moen (D–Whitehall)

==== Senate minority leadership ====
- Minority Leader: Michael G. Ellis (R–Neenah) (until Jan. 25, 2000)
  - Mary Panzer (R–West Bend) (after Jan. 25, 2000)
- Assistant Minority Leader: Brian Rude (R–Coon Valley) (until May 25, 2000)
  - Margaret Farrow (R–Pewaukee) (after May 30, 2000)

=== Assembly leadership ===
- Speaker of the Assembly: Scott R. Jensen (R–Waukesha)
- Speaker pro tempore: Stephen Freese (R–Jamestown)

==== Assembly majority leadership ====
- Majority Leader: Steven Foti (R–Oconomowoc)
- Assistant Majority Leader: Bonnie Ladwig (R–Mount Pleasant)

==== Assembly minority leadership ====
- Minority Leader: Shirley Krug (D–Milwaukee)
- Assistant Minority Leader: Marlin Schneider (D–Wisconsin Rapids)

== Members ==
=== Members of the Senate ===
Members of the Senate for the Ninety-Fourth Wisconsin Legislature:

Senate partisan representation Democratic: 17 seats Republican: 16 seats

Dist.	Senator	Party	Age (1999)	Home	First elected
01	Alan Lasee	Rep.	61	Rockland, Brown County	1977
02	Robert Cowles	Rep.	48	Green Bay, Brown County	1987
03	Brian Burke	Dem.	40	Milwaukee, Milwaukee County	1988
04	Gwen Moore	Dem.	47	Milwaukee, Milwaukee County	1992
05	Peggy Rosenzweig	Rep.	62	Wauwatosa, Milwaukee County	1993
06	Gary George	Dem.	44	Milwaukee, Milwaukee County	1980
07	Richard Grobschmidt	Dem.	50	South Milwaukee, Milwaukee County	1995
08	Alberta Darling	Rep.	54	River Hills, Milwaukee County	1992
09	James Baumgart	Dem.	60	Sheboygan, Sheboygan County	1998
10	Alice Clausing	Dem.	54	Menomonie, Dunn County	1992
11	Joanne Huelsman	Rep.	60	Waukesha, Waukesha County	1990
12	Roger Breske	Dem.	60	Elderon, Marathon County	1990
13	Scott Fitzgerald	Rep.	35	Clyman, Dodge County	1994
14	Robert T. Welch	Rep.	40	Marion, Waushara County	1995
15	Judy Robson	Dem.	59	Beloit, Rock County	1998
16	Charles Chvala	Dem.	44	Madison, Dane County	1984
17	Dale Schultz	Rep.	45	Richland Center, Richland County	1991
18	Carol Buettner	Rep.	50	Oshkosh, Winnebago County	1987
19	Michael G. Ellis	Rep.	57	Neenah, Winnebago County	1982
20	Mary Panzer	Rep.	47	West Bend, Washington County	1993
21	Kimberly Plache	Dem.	37	Racine, Racine County	1996
22	Bob Wirch	Dem.	55	Pleasant Prairie, Kenosha County	1996
23	David Zien	Rep.	48	Wheaton, Chippewa County	1993
24	Kevin Shibilski	Dem.	37	Stevens Point, Portage County	1995
25	Robert Jauch	Dem.	53	Poplar, Douglas County	1986
26	Fred Risser	Dem.	71	Madison, Dane County	1962
27	Jon Erpenbach	Dem.	37	Middleton, Dane County	1998
28	Mary Lazich	Rep.	46	New Berlin, Waukesha County	1998
29	Russ Decker	Dem.	45	Weston, Marathon County	1990
30	Gary Drzewiecki	Rep.	44	Pulaski, Brown County	1992
31	Rodney C. Moen	Dem.	61	Whitehall, Trempealeau County	1982
32	Brian Rude (res. May 25, 2000)	Rep.	43	Coon Valley, Vernon County	1984
32	--Vacant from May 25, 2000--				
33	Margaret Farrow	Rep.	64	Pewaukee, Waukesha County	1989

=== Members of the Assembly ===
Members of the Assembly for the Ninety-Fourth Wisconsin Legislature:

Assembly partisan representation Democratic: 45 seats Republican: 54 seats

Senate Dist.	Dist.	Representative	Party	Age (1999)	Home	First Elected
01	01	David E. Hutchison	Rep.	55	Red River	1994
01	02	Frank Lasee	Rep.	37	Ledgeview	1994
01	03	Alvin Ott	Rep.	49	Brillion	1986
02	04	Phil Montgomery	Rep.	41	Ashwaubenon	1998
02	05	Lee Meyerhofer	Dem.	34	Kaukauna	1998
02	06	John Ainsworth	Rep.	58	Waukechon	1990
03	07	Peter Bock	Dem.	50	Milwaukee	1986
03	08	Pedro Colón	Dem.	30	Milwaukee	1998
03	09	Tim Carpenter	Dem.	38	Milwaukee	1984
04	10	Annette Polly Williams	Dem.	61	Milwaukee	1980
04	11	Johnnie E. Morris-Tatum	Dem.	47	Milwaukee	1992
04	12	Shirley Krug	Dem.	40	Milwaukee	1984
05	13	David Cullen	Dem.	38	Milwaukee	1990
05	14	Scott Walker	Rep.	31	Wauwatosa	1993
05	15	Tony Staskunas	Dem.	37	West Allis	1996
06	16	Leon Young	Dem.	31	Milwaukee	1992
06	17	Spencer Coggs	Dem.	49	Milwaukee	1982
06	18	Antonio R. Riley	Dem.	35	Milwaukee	1992
07	19	Jon Richards	Dem.	35	Milwaukee	1998
07	20	Christine Sinicki	Dem.	38	Milwaukee	1998
07	21	Jeffrey Plale	Dem.	30	South Milwaukee	1996
08	22	Sheldon Wasserman	Dem.	37	Milwaukee	1994
08	23	John La Fave	Dem.	49	Brown Deer	1992
08	24	Suzanne Jeskewitz	Rep.	56	Menomonee Falls	1996
09	25	Bob Ziegelbauer	Dem.	47	Manitowoc	1992
09	26	Joe Leibham	Rep.	29	Sheboygan	1998
09	27	Steve Kestell	Rep.	43	Herman	1998
10	28	Mark Pettis	Rep.	48	La Follette	1998
10	29	Joe Plouff	Dem.	48	Menomonie	1996
10	30	Kitty Rhoades	Rep.	47	Hudson	1998
11	31	Stephen Nass	Rep.	46	Whitewater	1990
11	32	Scott R. Jensen	Rep.	38	Waukesha	1992
11	33	Daniel P. Vrakas	Rep.	43	Delafield	1990
12	34	Joe Handrick	Rep.	37	Minocqua	1994
12	35	Thomas D. Ourada (res. Jan. 29, 1999)	Rep.	40	Antigo	1984
12	35	Sarah Waukau (from May 12, 1999)	Dem.	52	Antigo	1999
12	36	Lorraine Seratti	Rep.	49	Florence	1992
13	37	David W. Ward	Rep.	45	Oakland	1992
13	38	Steven Foti	Rep.	40	Oconomowoc	1982
13	39	Robert Goetsch	Rep.	65	Oak Grove	1982
14	40	Jean Hundertmark	Rep.	44	Larrabee	1998
14	41	Luther Olsen	Rep.	47	Aurora	1994
14	42	Joan Wade Spillner	Rep.	36	Mecan	1998
15	43	Neal Kedzie	Rep.	42	La Grange	1996
15	44	Wayne W. Wood	Dem.	68	Janesville	1976
15	45	Dan Schooff	Dem.	27	Beloit	1998
16	46	Tom Hebl	Dem.	53	Sun Prairie	1996
16	47	Eugene Hahn	Rep.	69	Springvale	1990
16	48	Mark F. Miller	Dem.	55	Monona	1998
17	49	David A. Brandemuehl	Rep.	67	Mount Ida	1986
17	50	Sheryl Albers	Rep.	44	Westfield	1991
17	51	Stephen Freese	Rep.	38	Dodgeville	1990
18	52	John F. Townsend	Rep.	60	Fond du Lac	1998
18	53	Carol Owens	Rep.	67	Nekimi	1992
18	54	Gregg Underheim	Rep.	48	Oshkosh	1987
19	55	Dean Kaufert	Rep.	41	Neenah	1990
19	56	Judith Klusman	Rep.	42	Clayton	1988
19	57	Steve Wieckert	Rep.	44	Appleton	1996
20	58	Michael A. Lehman	Rep.	55	Hartford	1988
20	59	Glenn Grothman	Rep.	43	West Bend	1993
20	60	Timothy Hoven	Rep.	35	Port Washington	1994
21	61	Robert L. Turner	Dem.	51	Racine	1990
21	62	John Lehman	Dem.	53	Racine	1996
21	63	Bonnie Ladwig	Rep.	59	Mount Pleasant	1992
22	64	James Kreuser	Dem.	43	Kenosha	1993
22	65	John Steinbrink	Dem.	49	Pleasant Prairie	1996
22	66	Cloyd A. Porter	Rep.	63	Burlington	1972
23	67	Tom Sykora	Rep.	52	Eagle Point	1996
23	68	Larry Balow	Dem.	55	Eau Claire	1998
23	69	Scott Suder	Rep.	30	Abbotsford	1998
24	70	Donald W. Hasenohrl	Dem.	63	Pittsville	1974
24	71	Julie Lassa	Dem.	28	Plover	1998
24	72	Marlin Schneider	Dem.	56	Wisconsin Rapids	1970
25	73	Frank Boyle	Dem.	53	Summit	1986
25	74	Gary E. Sherman	Dem.	49	Port Wing	1998
25	75	Mary Hubler	Dem.	46	Rice Lake	1984
26	76	Terese Berceau	Dem.	48	Madison	1998
26	77	Spencer Black	Dem.	48	Madison	1984
26	78	Mark Pocan	Dem.	34	Madison	1998
27	79	Rick Skindrud	Rep.	54	Primrose	1993
27	80	Mike Powers	Rep.	36	Albany	1994
27	81	David Travis	Dem.	50	Madison	1978
28	82	Jeff Stone	Rep.	37	Greenfield	1998
28	83	Scott Gunderson	Rep.	42	Norway	1994
28	84	Mark Gundrum	Rep.	28	New Berlin	1998
29	85	Gregory Huber	Dem.	42	Wausau	1988
29	86	Jerry Petrowski	Rep.	38	Stettin	1998
29	87	Martin Reynolds	Dem.	48	Ladysmith	1990
30	88	Carol Kelso	Rep.	53	Green Bay	1988
30	89	John Gard	Rep.	35	Peshtigo	1987
30	90	John Joseph Ryba	Dem.	69	Green Bay	1992
31	91	Barbara Gronemus	Dem.	67	Whitehall	1982
31	92	Terry Musser	Rep.	51	Irving	1984
31	93	Robin Kreibich	Rep.	39	Eau Claire	1992
32	94	Michael Huebsch	Rep.	34	West Salem	1994
32	95	Mark Meyer	Dem.	35	La Crosse	1992
32	96	DuWayne Johnsrud	Rep.	55	Eastman	1984
33	97	Peggy Krusick	Dem.	42	Milwaukee	1983
33	98	Marc C. Duff	Rep.	37	New Berlin	1988
33	99	Frank Urban	Rep.	68	Brookfield	1989

== Employees ==
=== Senate employees ===
- Chief Clerk: Donald J. Schneider
- Sergeant-at-Arms: Jon H. Hochkammer

=== Assembly employees ===
- Chief Clerk: Charles R. Sanders
- Sergeant-at-Arms: Denise L. Solie
