= 92nd Wisconsin Legislature =

Wisconsin legislative term for 1995–1996

←	91st	93rd	→
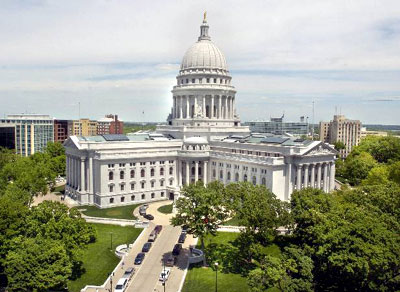
- Wisconsin State Capitol

Overview
- Legislative body: Wisconsin Legislature
- Meeting place: Wisconsin State Capitol
- Term: January 2, 1995 – January 6, 1997
- Election: November 8, 1994

Senate
- Members: 33
- Senate President: Brian Rude (R) ^{until Jun. 13, 1996}; Fred Risser (D) ^{after Jun. 13, 1996}
- President pro tempore: Alan Lasee (R) ^{until Jun. 13, 1996}
- Party control: Republican ^{until Jun. 13, 1996}; Democratic ^{after Jun. 13, 1996}

Assembly
- Members: 99
- Assembly Speaker: David Prosser Jr. (R)
- Speaker pro tempore: Stephen Freese (R)
- Party control: Republican

Sessions
- Regular: January 3, 1995 – January 6, 1997

Special sessions
- Jan. 1995 Spec.: January 14, 1995 – January 14, 1995
- Sep. 1995 Spec.: September 5, 1995 – October 12, 1995

The Ninety-Second Wisconsin Legislature convened from January 3, 1995, to January 6, 1997, in regular session, and also convened in two special sessions.

This session represented the first time the Republican Party of Wisconsin held full control of state government since 1970. They used that power to make extensive changes to the organization of state government, and implemented the landmark Wisconsin Works program, which became a model for the "welfare-to-work" programs of the 1990s. This session also saw the Legislature authorizing new taxes to fund the construction of Miller Park for the Milwaukee Brewers. The stadium tax plan, however, resulted in the Republicans losing control of the state Senate in a June 1996 recall election.

Senators representing odd-numbered districts were newly elected for this session and were serving the first two years of a four-year term. Assembly members were elected to a two-year term. Assembly members and odd-numbered senators were elected in the general election of November 8, 1994. Senators representing even-numbered districts were serving the third and fourth year of a four-year term, having been elected in the general election of November 3, 1992.

The governor of Wisconsin during this entire term was Republican Tommy Thompson, of Juneau County, serving the first two years of his third four-year term, having won re-election in the 1994 Wisconsin gubernatorial election.

== Major events ==
- January 3, 1995: Third inauguration of Tommy Thompson as Governor of Wisconsin.
- April 4, 1995: 1995 Wisconsin spring election:
  - Ann Walsh Bradley was elected to the Wisconsin Supreme Court to succeed Nathan Heffernan.
  - Wisconsin voters rejected three amendments to the state constitution:
    - Would have removed several masculine gender pronouns and replaced with gender-neutral pronouns.
    - Would have removed a prohibition on judicial officers accepting election or appointment to another non-judicial office within the term of their elected judicial term.
    - Would have allowed the state legislature to assign lottery profits to athletics facilities rather than the general state treasury.
- April 19, 1995: A truck bomb was detonated by anti-government terrorists at the Alfred P. Murrah Federal Building in Oklahoma City, Oklahoma, killing 168.
- July 12–16, 1995: A major heat wave effected Milwaukee and southeast Wisconsin.
- August 1, 1995: Roland B. Day became the 24th chief justice of the Wisconsin Supreme Court by rule of seniority, at the expiration of the term of chief justice Nathan Heffernan.
- November 14–19, 1995: Federal government shutdown.
- December 16, 1995 – January 6, 1996: Federal government shutdown.
- April 2, 1996: N. Patrick Crooks was elected to the Wisconsin Supreme Court to succeed Roland B. Day.
- June 14, 1996: State senator George Petak was defeated in a recall election by Kimberly Plache. Petak was the first Wisconsin state legislator to be successfully recalled from office.
- August 1, 1996: Shirley Abrahamson became the 25th chief justice of the Wisconsin Supreme Court by rule of seniority, at the expiration of the term of chief justice Roland B. Day.
- August 22, 1996: U.S. President Bill Clinton signed the Personal Responsibility and Work Opportunity Act, implementing federal welfare-to-work programs.
- November 5, 1996: 1996 United States general election:
  - Bill Clinton (D) re-elected President of the United States.
  - Wisconsin voters ratified an amendment to the state constitution making a person ineligible to run for office if they had previously been convicted of a felony or misdemeanor involving a violation of public trust.

== Major legislation ==
- July 28, 1995: An Act relating to: state finances and appropriations, constituting the executive budget act of the 1995 legislature, and making appropriations, 1995 Act 27. Among other things, created the Wisconsin Department of Financial Institutions and the Wisconsin Department of Tourism, moved the state lottery under the Wisconsin Department of Revenue, and renamed the Department of Business Development as the Department of Commerce. Welfare programs were also moved from the Department of Health and Social Services to the Department of Industry, Labor and Human Relations, which was renamed the Department of Industry, Labor and Job Development. It also enabled the governor to directly appoint a secretary of agriculture, rather than having that secretary chosen by the state board of agriculture.
- October 26, 1995: An Act ... relating to: creating a local professional baseball park district in certain jurisdictions; giving a local professional baseball park district the authority to issue bonds and granting income tax exemptions for interest income on bonds issued by the district; making a state moral obligation pledge with respect to bonds issued by a local professional baseball park district; giving a local professional baseball park district the authority to impose a sales tax and a use tax; creating an income and franchise tax exemption for a local professional baseball park district; requiring contributions to youth sports organizations; creating an exception for a local professional baseball park district from certain landlord−tenant provisions; increasing a limitation on certain economic development bonding by the Wisconsin Housing and Economic Development Authority; ~~a smoke−free environment;~~ making appropriations; and providing a penalty, 1995 Act 56. Vetoed in part, this law created the special tax-district in southeast Wisconsin to fund the building of Miller Park baseball stadium.
- May 9, 1996: An Act ... relating to: creating a new public assistance program for families with dependent children, modifying the sunset of the aid to families with dependent children program, modifying administration of the food stamp program, modifying the eligibility requirements of certain recipients of medical assistance, creating a program to provide payment to a relative, other than a parent, who is providing care and maintenance for a child, modifying the postsecondary education and vocational skills training option in the job opportunities and basic skills program, applying the learnfare provisions statewide to certain individuals who are 6 to 19 years of age, background investigations of day care center licensees, contractors, employes, prospective employes and adult residents, modifying eligibility requirements for low−income and at−risk child care, grants to certain individuals for vocational training or education, group health insurance reform, creating a tax exemption, making modifications to the job opportunities and basic skills program, making modifications to the food stamp employment and training program, ~~allowing advance payments of the earned income tax credit,~~ providing an exemption from emergency rule procedures, providing an exemption from rule−making procedures, granting rule−making authority, making appropriations and providing penalties, 1995 Act 289. Vetoed in part, this law implemented Wisconsin's landmark Wisconsin Works program, which became a model for the "welfare-to-work" programs of the 1990s. Also allowed the Wisconsin Department of Industry, Labor and Job Development to rename itself the Wisconsin Department of Workforce Development.
- June 11, 1996: An Act ... relating to: granting authority to the division of hearings and appeals in the department of administration to hold administrative hearings for the department of health and family services and the department of industry, labor and job development, granting rule−making authority and making appropriations, 1995 Act 370. Transferred administrative appeals hearings from the Department of Health Services or the Department of Industry, Labor and Job Development to a new division of the Wisconsin Department of Administration.

== Party summary ==
=== Senate summary ===
Senate partisan composition Democratic: 16 seats Republican: 17 seats

	Party (Shading indicates majority caucus)		Total	
	Dem.	Rep.	Total	Vacant
End of previous Legislature	16	17	33	0
Start of Reg. Session	16	17	33	0
From Feb. 17, 1995 (Note: Democrat David Helbach (24th District) resigned.)	15	17	32	1
From May 15, 1995 (Note: Democrat Kevin Shibilski (24th District) was sworn in to replace David Helbach.)	16	17	33	0
From Jul. 5, 1995 (Note: Republican Joseph Leean (14th District) resigned.)	16	16	32	1
From Sep. 13, 1995 (Note: Democrat John Plewa (7th District) died.)	15	16	31	2
From Sep. 20, 1995 (Note: Republican Robert T. Welch (14th District) was sworn in to replace Joseph Leean.)	15	17	32	1
From Jan. 2, 1996 (Note: Democrat Richard Grobschmidt (7th District) was sworn in to replace John Plewa.)	16	17	33	0
From Jun. 13, 1996 (Note: Republican George Petak (21st District) was recalled from office and replaced by Democrat Kimberly Plache.)	17	16	33	0
Final voting share	51.52%	48.48%		
Beginning of the next Legislature	17	16	33	0

=== Assembly summary ===
Assembly partisan composition Democratic: 48 seats Republican: 51 seats

	Party (Shading indicates majority caucus)		Total	
	Dem.	Rep.	Total	Vacant
End of previous Legislature	52	47	99	0
Start of Reg. Session	48	51	99	0
From Jan. 2, 1996 (Note: Democrat Richard Grobschmidt (21st District) resigned after his election to the state senate.)	47	51	98	1
From Mar. 26, 1996 (Note: Democrat Jeffrey Plale (21st District) was sworn in to replace Richard Grobschmidt.)	48	51	99	0
From Jun. 13, 1996 (Note: Democrat Kimberly Plache (62nd District) resigned after her election to the state senate.)	47	51	98	1
Final voting share	47.96%	52.04%		
Beginning of the next Legislature	47	52	99	0

== Sessions ==
- Regular session: January 3, 1995 – January 6, 1997
- Jan. 1995 special session: January 14, 1995
- Sep. 1995 special session: September 5, 1995 – October 12, 1995

== Leadership ==
=== Senate leadership ===
- President of the Senate: Brian Rude (R–Coon Valley) (until Jun. 13, 1996)
  - Fred Risser (D–Madison) (after Jun. 13, 1996)
- President pro tempore: Alan Lasee (R–Rockland) (until Jun. 13, 1996)

==== Senate majority leadership ====
- Majority Leader: Michael G. Ellis (R–Neenah) (until Jun. 13, 1996)
  - Charles Chvala (D–Madison) (after Jun. 13, 1996)
- Assistant Majority Leader: Margaret Farrow (R–Elm Grove) (until Jun. 13, 1996)
  - Rodney C. Moen (D–Whitehall) (after Jun. 13, 1996)

==== Senate minority leadership ====
- Minority Leader: Robert Jauch (D–Poplar) (until Oct. 17, 1995)
  - Charles Chvala (D–Madison) (from Oct. 24, 1995 to Jun. 13, 1996)
  - Michael G. Ellis (R–Neenah) (after Jun. 13, 1996)
- Assistant Minority Leader: Fred Risser (D–Madison) (until Jun. 13, 1996)
  - Brian Rude (R–Coon Valley) (after Jun. 13, 1996)

=== Assembly leadership ===
- Speaker of the Assembly: David Prosser Jr. (R–Appleton)
- Speaker pro tempore: Stephen Freese (R–Jamestown)

==== Assembly majority leadership ====
- Majority Leader: Scott R. Jensen (R–Waukesha)
- Assistant Majority Leader: Judith Klusman (R–Clayton)

==== Assembly minority leadership ====
- Minority Leader: Walter Kunicki (D–Milwaukee)
- Assistant Minority Leader: Marlin Schneider (D–Wisconsin Rapids)

== Members ==
=== Members of the Senate ===
Members of the Senate for the Ninety-Second Wisconsin Legislature:

Senate partisan representation Democratic: 16 seats Republican: 17 seats

Dist.	Senator	Party	Age (1995)	Home	First elected
01	Alan Lasee	Rep.	57	Rockland, Brown County	1977
02	Robert Cowles	Rep.	44	Green Bay, Brown County	1987
03	Brian Burke	Dem.	36	Milwaukee, Milwaukee County	1988
04	Gwen Moore	Dem.	43	Milwaukee, Milwaukee County	1992
05	Peggy Rosenzweig	Rep.	58	Wauwatosa, Milwaukee County	1993
06	Gary George	Dem.	40	Milwaukee, Milwaukee County	1980
07	John Plewa (died Sep. 13, 1995)	Dem.	49	Milwaukee, Milwaukee County	1984
07	Richard Grobschmidt (from Jan. 2, 1996)	Dem.	47	South Milwaukee, Milwaukee County	1995
08	Alberta Darling	Rep.	50	River Hills, Milwaukee County	1992
09	Calvin Potter	Dem.	49	Kohler, Sheboygan County	1990
10	Alice Clausing	Dem.	50	Menomonie, Dunn County	1992
11	Joanne Huelsman	Rep.	56	Waukesha, Waukesha County	1990
12	Roger Breske	Dem.	56	Elderon, Marathon County	1990
13	Scott Fitzgerald	Rep.	31	Juneau, Dodge County	1994
14	Joseph Leean (res. Jul. 5, 1995)	Rep.	52	Dayton, Waupaca County	1984
14	Robert T. Welch (from Sep. 20, 1995)	Rep.	37	Marion, Waushara County	1995
15	Timothy Weeden	Rep.	43	Beloit, Rock County	1987
16	Charles Chvala	Dem.	40	Madison, Dane County	1984
17	Dale Schultz	Rep.	41	Richland Center, Richland County	1991
18	Carol Buettner	Rep.	46	Oshkosh, Winnebago County	1987
19	Michael G. Ellis	Rep.	53	Neenah, Winnebago County	1982
20	Mary Panzer	Rep.	43	West Bend, Washington County	1993
21	George Petak (rem. Jun. 13, 1996)	Rep.	45	Racine, Racine County	1990
21	Kimberly Plache (from Jun. 13, 1996)	Dem.	35	Racine, Racine County	1996
22	Joseph F. Andrea	Dem.	67	Kenosha, Kenosha County	1984
23	David Zien	Rep.	44	Eau Claire, Eau Claire County	1993
24	David Helbach (res. Feb. 17, 1995)	Dem.	46	Stevens Point, Portage County	1983
24	Kevin Shibilski (from May 15, 1995)	Dem.	33	Stevens Point, Portage County	1995
25	Robert Jauch	Dem.	49	Poplar, Douglas County	1986
26	Fred Risser	Dem.	67	Madison, Dane County	1962
27	Joe Wineke	Dem.	37	Verona, Dane County	1993
28	Lynn Adelman	Dem.	55	Mukwonago, Waukesha County	1976
29	Russ Decker	Dem.	41	Schofield, Marathon County	1990
30	Gary Drzewiecki	Rep.	40	Pulaski, Brown County	1992
31	Rodney C. Moen	Dem.	57	Whitehall, Trempealeau County	1982
32	Brian Rude	Rep.	39	Coon Valley, Vernon County	1984
33	Margaret Farrow	Rep.	60	Elm Grove, Waukesha County	1989

=== Members of the Assembly ===
Members of the Assembly for the Ninety-Second Wisconsin Legislature:

Assembly partisan representation Democratic: 48 seats Republican: 51 seats

Senate Dist.	Dist.	Representative	Party	Age (1995)	Home	First Elected
01	01	David E. Hutchison	Rep.	51	Red River	1994
01	02	Frank Lasee	Rep.	33	Ledgeview	1994
01	03	Alvin Ott	Rep.	45	Brillion	1986
02	04	Mark A. Green	Rep.	34	Green Bay	1992
02	05	William N. Vander Loop	Dem.	62	Kaukauna	1990
02	06	John Ainsworth	Rep.	54	Waukechon	1990
03	07	Peter Bock	Dem.	46	Milwaukee	1986
03	08	Walter Kunicki	Dem.	36	Milwaukee	1980
03	09	Tim Carpenter	Dem.	34	Milwaukee	1984
04	10	Annette Polly Williams	Dem.	57	Milwaukee	1980
04	11	Johnnie E. Morris-Tatum	Dem.	43	Milwaukee	1992
04	12	Shirley Krug	Dem.	36	Milwaukee	1984
05	13	David Cullen	Dem.	34	Milwaukee	1990
05	14	Scott Walker	Rep.	27	Wauwatosa	1993
05	15	Jeannette Bell	Dem.	53	West Allis	1982
06	16	Leon Young	Dem.	27	Milwaukee	1992
06	17	Spencer Coggs	Dem.	45	Milwaukee	1982
06	18	Antonio R. Riley	Dem.	31	Milwaukee	1992
07	19	Barbara Notestein	Dem.	45	Milwaukee	1984
07	20	Rosemary Potter	Dem.	42	Milwaukee	1989
07	21	Richard Grobschmidt (res. Jan. 2, 1996)	Dem.	46	South Milwaukee	1984
07	21	Jeffrey Plale (from Mar. 26, 1996)	Dem.	27	South Milwaukee	1996
08	22	Sheldon Wasserman	Dem.	33	Milwaukee	1994
08	23	John La Fave	Dem.	45	Brown Deer	1992
08	24	Lolita Schneiders	Rep.	63	Menomonee Falls	1980
09	25	Bob Ziegelbauer	Dem.	43	Manitowoc	1992
09	26	James Baumgart	Dem.	56	Sheboygan	1990
09	27	Clifford Otte	Rep.	61	Sheboygan Falls	1992
10	28	Robert M. Dueholm	Dem.	49	Bone Lake	1994
10	29	Alvin Baldus	Dem.	68	Menomonie	1966
10	30	Sheila Harsdorf	Rep.	38	River Falls	1988
11	31	Stephen Nass	Rep.	42	Whitewater	1990
11	32	Scott R. Jensen	Rep.	34	Waukesha	1992
11	33	Daniel P. Vrakas	Rep.	39	Hartland	1990
12	34	Joe Handrick	Rep.	33	Minocqua	1994
12	35	Thomas D. Ourada	Rep.	36	Antigo	1984
12	36	Lorraine Seratti	Rep.	45	Florence	1992
13	37	David W. Ward	Rep.	41	Fort Atkinson	1992
13	38	Steven Foti	Rep.	36	Oconomowoc	1982
13	39	Robert Goetsch	Rep.	61	Oak Grove	1982
14	40	William Lorge	Rep.	34	Deer Creek	1988
14	41	Luther Olsen	Rep.	43	Aurora	1994
14	42	Ben Brancel	Rep.	44	Douglas	1986
15	43	Charles W. Coleman	Rep.	62	Richmond	1982
15	44	Wayne W. Wood	Dem.	64	Janesville	1976
15	45	Judy Robson	Dem.	55	Beloit	1987
16	46	Rudy Silbaugh	Rep.	64	Stoughton	1990
16	47	Eugene Hahn	Rep.	65	Springvale	1990
16	48	Doris Hanson	Dem.	69	McFarland	1992
17	49	David A. Brandemuehl	Rep.	63	Mount Ida	1986
17	50	Sheryl Albers	Rep.	40	Westfield	1991
17	51	Stephen Freese	Rep.	34	Dodgeville	1990
18	52	John P. Dobyns	Rep.	50	Fond du Lac	1992
18	53	Carol Owens	Rep.	63	Nekimi	1992
18	54	Gregg Underheim	Rep.	44	Oshkosh	1987
19	55	Dean Kaufert	Rep.	37	Neenah	1990
19	56	Judith Klusman	Rep.	38	Clayton	1988
19	57	David Prosser Jr.	Rep.	52	Appleton	1978
20	58	Michael A. Lehman	Rep.	51	Hartford	1988
20	59	Glenn Grothman	Rep.	39	West Bend	1993
20	60	Timothy Hoven	Rep.	31	Port Washington	1994
21	61	Robert L. Turner	Dem.	47	Racine	1990
21	62	Kimberly Plache (res. Jun. 13, 1996)	Dem.	33	Racine	1988
21	62	--Vacant from Jun. 13, 1996--				
21	63	Bonnie Ladwig	Rep.	55	Caledonia	1992
22	64	James Kreuser	Dem.	39	Kenosha	1993
22	65	Robert Wirch	Dem.	51	Kenosha	1992
22	66	Cloyd A. Porter	Rep.	59	Burlington	1972
23	67	Michael O. Wilder	Dem.	53	Chippewa Falls	1992
23	68	David Plombon	Dem.	33	Stanley	1993
23	69	Robert K. Zukowski	Rep.	64	Reseburg	1992
24	70	Donald W. Hasenohrl	Dem.	59	Pittsville	1974
24	71	William Murat	Dem.	37	Stevens Point	1994
24	72	Marlin Schneider	Dem.	52	Wisconsin Rapids	1970
25	73	Frank Boyle	Dem.	49	Summit	1986
25	74	Barbara Linton	Dem.	42	Ashland	1986
25	75	Mary Hubler	Dem.	42	Rice Lake	1984
26	76	Rebecca Young	Dem.	60	Madison	1984
26	77	Spencer Black	Dem.	44	Madison	1984
26	78	Tammy Baldwin	Dem.	32	Madison	1992
27	79	Rick Skindrud	Rep.	50	Primrose	1993
27	80	Mike Powers	Rep.	32	Albany	1994
27	81	David Travis	Dem.	46	Madison	1978
28	82	James A. Rutkowski	Dem.	52	Greenfield	1970
28	83	Scott Gunderson	Rep.	38	Waterford	1994
28	84	Mary Lazich	Rep.	42	New Berlin	1992
29	85	Gregory Huber	Dem.	38	Wausau	1988
29	86	Thomas J. Springer	Dem.	26	Mosinee	1991
29	87	Martin Reynolds	Dem.	44	Ladysmith	1990
30	88	Carol Kelso	Rep.	49	Green Bay	1988
30	89	John Gard	Rep.	31	Peshtigo	1987
30	90	John Joseph Ryba	Dem.	65	Green Bay	1992
31	91	Barbara Gronemus	Dem.	63	Whitehall	1982
31	92	Terry Musser	Rep.	47	Irving	1984
31	93	Robin Kreibich	Rep.	35	Eau Claire	1992
32	94	Michael Huebsch	Rep.	30	Onalaska	1994
32	95	Mark Meyer	Dem.	31	La Crosse	1992
32	96	DuWayne Johnsrud	Rep.	51	Eastman	1984
33	97	Peggy Krusick	Dem.	38	Milwaukee	1983
33	98	Marc C. Duff	Rep.	33	New Berlin	1988
33	99	Frank Urban	Rep.	64	Brookfield	1989

== Employees ==
=== Senate employees ===
- Chief Clerk: Donald J. Schneider
- Sergeant-at-Arms: Jon H. Hochkammer

=== Assembly employees ===
- Chief Clerk: Thomas T. Melvin (until Jan. 31, 1995)
  - Charles R. Sanders (after Jan. 31, 1995)
- Sergeant-at-Arms: John A. Scocos
