= 95th Wisconsin Legislature =

Wisconsin legislative term for 2001-2002

←	94th	96th	→
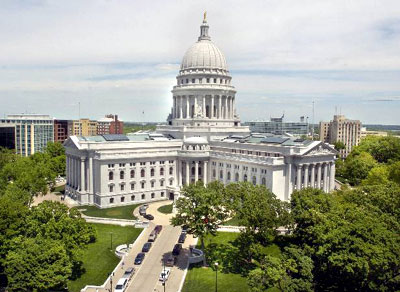
- Wisconsin State Capitol

Overview
- Legislative body: Wisconsin Legislature
- Meeting place: Wisconsin State Capitol
- Term: January 1, 2001 – January 6, 2003
- Election: November 7, 2000

Senate
- Members: 33
- Senate President: Fred Risser (D)
- President pro tempore: Gary R. George (D)
- Party control: Democratic

Assembly
- Members: 99
- Assembly Speaker: Scott Jensen (R)
- Speaker pro tempore: Stephen Freese (R)
- Party control: Republican

Sessions
- Regular: January 3, 2001 – January 6, 2003

Special sessions
- May 2001 Spec.: May 1, 2001 – May 3, 2001
- Jan. 2002 Spec.: January 22, 2002 – July 8, 2002
- May 2002 Spec.: May 13, 2002 – May 15, 2002

The Ninety-Fifth Wisconsin Legislature convened from January 3, 2001, to January 6, 2003, in regular session, and also convened in three special sessions.

During this session, an exposé by the Wisconsin State Journal revealed sprawling corruption in both chambers and both parties in the Wisconsin Legislature. In what was referred to as the "caucus scandal", five legislators, including leaders of both major parties, were eventually implicated and prosecuted for extensive use of state-paid legislative employees for political purposes.

Senators representing even-numbered districts were newly elected for this session and were serving the first two years of a four-year term. Assembly members were elected to a two-year term. Assembly members and even-numbered senators were elected in the general election of November 7, 2000. Senators representing odd-numbered districts were serving the third and fourth year of their four-year term, having been elected in the general election held on November 3, 1998.

The governor of Wisconsin at the start of this term was Republican Tommy Thompson, of Juneau County, serving the beginning of the third year of his fourth four-year term, having won re-election in the 1998 Wisconsin gubernatorial election. Thompson resigned February 1, 2001, to accept appointment as United States Secretary of Health and Human Services. At that time, the lieutenant governor, Republican Scott McCallum, of Columbia County, then ascended to become governor for the remainder of this legislative term.

== Major events ==
- January 20, 2001: Inauguration of George W. Bush as 43rd President of the United States.
- May 20, 2001: The Wisconsin State Journal published its initial exposé revealing state legislators had been misusing legislative staffers for political purposes.
- September 11, 2001: September 11 attacks destroyed the World Trade Center and damaged The Pentagon.
- October 1, 2001: Start of Operation Enduring Freedom.
- October 7, 2001: United States invasion of Afghanistan initiated the War in Afghanistan.
- May 30, 2002: A three-judge panel of the United States District Court for the Eastern District of Wisconsin published its decision in Baumgart v. Wendelberger, serving as the redistricting plan for Wisconsin for the 2000 United States census.
- November 5, 2002: 2002 United States general election:
  - Jim Doyle (D) elected Governor of Wisconsin.

== Major legislation ==
- August 31, 2001: An Act relating to: state finances and appropriations, constituting the executive budget act of the 2001 legislature, 2001 Act 16. Vetoed in part.

== Party summary ==
=== Senate summary ===
Senate partisan composition Democratic: 18 seats Republican: 15 seats

	Party (Shading indicates majority caucus)		Total	
	Democratic	Republican	Total	Vacant
End of previous Legislature	17	15	32	1
Start of Reg. Session	18	15	33	0
from May 9, 2001 (Note: Republican Margaret Farrow (District 33) resigned after being appointed Lieutenant Governor of Wisconsin.)	18	14	32	1
from July 18, 2001 (Note: Republican Theodore Kanavas (District 33) sworn in to replace Margaret Farrow.)	18	15	33	0
Final voting share	54.55%	45.45%		
Beginning of the next Legislature	13	18	31	2

=== Assembly summary ===
Assembly partisan composition Democratic: 43 seats Republican: 56 seats

	Party (Shading indicates majority caucus)		Total	
	Democratic	Republican	Total	Vacant
End of previous Legislature	45	54	99	0
Start of Reg. Session	43	56	99	0
From Aug. 31, 2001 (Note: Republican Joan Wade (42nd District) resigned.)	43	55	98	1
From Nov. 16, 2001 (Note: Republican Jacob Hines (42nd District) was sworn in to replace Joan Wade.)	43	56	99	0
From Apr. 30, 2002 (Note: Republican Scott Walker (14th District) resigned after his election as county executive.)	43	55	98	1
From Aug. 1, 2002 (Note: Republican Timothy Hoven (60th District) resigned.)	43	54	97	2
From Nov. 5, 2002 (Note: Republican Leah Vukmir (14th District) was sworn in to replace Scott Walker.)	43	55	98	1
Final voting share	43.88%	56.12%		
Beginning of the next Legislature	41	58	99	0

== Sessions ==
- Regular session: January 3, 2001 – January 6, 2003
- May 2001 special session: May 1, 2001 – May 3, 2001
- January 2002 special session: January 22, 2002 – July 8, 2002
- May 2002 special session: May 13, 2002 – May 15, 2002

== Leadership ==
=== Senate ===
- President: Fred Risser (D–Madison)
- President pro tempore: Gary R. George (D–Milwaukee)

==== Majority Leadership ====
- Majority Leader: Charles Chvala (D–Madison)
- Assistant Majority Leader: Rodney C. Moen (D–Whitehall)
- Majority Caucus Chair: Judy Robson (D–Beloit)

==== Minority Leadership ====
- Minority Leader: Mary Panzer (R–West Bend)
- Assistant Minority Leader: Margaret Farrow (R–Pewaukee) (until May 9, 2001)
  - Alan Lasee (R–Rockland) (after May 9, 2001)
- Minority Caucus Chair: David Zien (R–Wheaton)
- Minority Caucus Vice Chair: Carol Roessler (R–Oshkosh)

=== Assembly ===
- Speaker of the Assembly: Scott R. Jensen (R–Waukesha)
- Speaker pro tempore: Stephen Freese (R–Jamestown)

==== Majority Leadership ====
- Majority Leader: Steven Foti (R–Oconomowoc)
- Assistant Majority Leader: Bonnie Ladwig (R–Mount Pleasant)
- Majority Caucus Chair: Daniel P. Vrakas (R–Delafield)

==== Minority Leadership ====
- Minority Leader: Shirley Krug (D–Milwaukee) (until May 1, 2001)
  - Spencer Black (D–Madison) (after May 1, 2001)
- Assistant Minority Leader: Spencer Black (D–Madison) (until May 1, 2001)
  - James Kreuser (D–Kenosha) (after May 1, 2001)
- Minority Caucus Chair: Peter Bock (D–Milwaukee)

== Members ==
=== Members of the Senate ===
Members of the Senate for the Ninety-Fifth Wisconsin Legislature:

Senate partisan representation Democratic: 18 seats Republican: 15 seats

Dist.	Senator	Party	Age (2001)	Home	First elected
01	Alan Lasee	Rep.	63	De Pere, Brown County	1977
02	Robert Cowles	Rep.	50	Green Bay, Brown County	1987
03	Brian B. Burke	Dem.	42	Milwaukee, Milwaukee County	1988
04	Gwen Moore	Dem.	49	Milwaukee, Milwaukee County	1992
05	Peggy Rosenzweig	Rep.	64	Wauwatosa, Milwaukee County	1993
06	Gary R. George	Dem.	46	Milwaukee, Milwaukee County	1980
07	Richard Grobschmidt	Dem.	52	South Milwaukee, Milwaukee County	1995
08	Alberta Darling	Rep.	56	River Hills, Milwaukee County	1992
09	James Baumgart	Dem.	62	Sheboygan, Sheboygan County	1998
10	Sheila Harsdorf	Rep.	44	River Falls, Pierce County	2000
11	Joanne Huelsman	Rep.	62	Waukesha, Waukesha County	1990
12	Roger Breske	Dem.	62	Eland, Shawano County	1990
13	Scott L. Fitzgerald	Rep.	37	Juneau, Dodge County	1994
14	Robert T. Welch	Rep.	42	Redgranite, Waushara County	1995
15	Judy Robson	Dem.	61	Beloit, Rock County	1987
16	Charles Chvala	Dem.	46	Madison, Dane County	1984
17	Dale Schultz	Rep.	47	Richland Center, Richland County	1991
18	Carol Roessler	Rep.	52	Oshkosh, Winnebago County	1987
19	Michael G. Ellis	Rep.	59	Neenah, Winnebago County	1982
20	Mary Panzer	Rep.	49	West Bend, Washington County	1993
21	Kimberly Plache	Dem.	39	Racine, Racine County	1996
22	Robert Wirch	Dem.	57	Pleasant Prairie, Kenosha County	1996
23	David Zien	Rep.	50	Eau Claire, Eau Claire County	1993
24	Kevin Shibilski	Dem.	39	Stevens Point, Portage County	1995
25	Robert Jauch	Dem.	55	Poplar, Douglas County	1986
26	Fred Risser	Dem.	73	Madison, Dane County	1962
27	Jon Erpenbach	Dem.	39	Middleton, Dane County	1998
28	Mary Lazich	Rep.	48	New Berlin, Waukesha County	1998
29	Russ Decker	Dem.	47	Schofield, Marathon County	1990
30	Dave Hansen	Dem.	53	Green Bay, Brown County	2000
31	Rodney C. Moen	Dem.	63	Whitehall, Trempealeau County	1982
32	Mark Meyer	Dem.	37	La Crosse, La Crosse County	2000
33	Margaret Farrow (res. May 9, 2001)	Rep.	66	Pewaukee, Waukesha County	1989
33	Theodore Kanavas (from July 18, 2001)	Rep.	40	Brookfield, Waukesha County	2001

=== Members of the Assembly ===
Members of the Assembly for the Ninety-Fifth Wisconsin Legislature:

Assembly partisan representation Democratic: 43 seats Republican: 56 seats

Senate Dist.	Dist.	Representative	Party	Age (2001)	Home	First Elected
01	01	Garey Bies	Rep.	54	Sister Bay	2000
01	02	Frank Lasee	Rep.	39	Bellevue	1994
01	03	Alvin Ott	Rep.	51	Brillion	1986
02	04	Phil Montgomery	Rep.	43	Ashwaubenon	1998
02	05	Lee Meyerhofer	Dem.	36	Kaukauna	1998
02	06	John Ainsworth	Rep.	60	Waukechon	1990
03	07	Peter Bock	Dem.	52	Milwaukee	1986
03	08	Pedro Colón	Dem.	32	Milwaukee	1998
03	09	Tim Carpenter	Dem.	40	Milwaukee	1984
04	10	Annette Polly Williams	Dem.	63	Milwaukee	1980
04	11	Johnnie E. Morris-Tatum	Dem.	49	Milwaukee	1992
04	12	Shirley Krug	Dem.	42	Milwaukee	1984
05	13	David Cullen	Dem.	40	Milwaukee	1990
05	14	Scott Walker (res. Apr. 30, 2002)	Rep.	33	Wauwatosa	1993
05	14	Leah Vukmir (from Nov. 5, 2002)	Rep.	35	Wauwatosa	2002
05	15	Tony Staskunas	Dem.	39	West Allis	1996
06	16	Leon Young	Dem.	33	Milwaukee	1992
06	17	Spencer Coggs	Dem.	51	Milwaukee	1982
06	18	Antonio R. Riley	Dem.	37	Milwaukee	1992
07	19	Jon Richards	Dem.	37	Milwaukee	1998
07	20	Christine Sinicki	Dem.	40	Milwaukee	1998
07	21	Jeffrey Plale	Dem.	32	South Milwaukee	1996
08	22	Sheldon Wasserman	Dem.	39	Milwaukee	1994
08	23	John La Fave	Dem.	51	Milwaukee	1992
08	24	Suzanne Jeskewitz	Rep.	58	Menomonee Falls	1996
09	25	Bob Ziegelbauer	Dem.	49	Manitowoc	1992
09	26	Joe Leibham	Rep.	31	Sheboygan	1998
09	27	Steve Kestell	Rep.	45	Herman	1998
10	28	Mark Pettis	Rep.	50	La Follette	1998
10	29	Joe Plouff	Dem.	50	Menomonie	1996
10	30	Kitty Rhoades	Rep.	49	Hudson	1998
11	31	Stephen Nass	Rep.	48	Whitewater	1990
11	32	Scott R. Jensen	Rep.	40	Waukesha	1992
11	33	Daniel P. Vrakas	Rep.	45	Delafield	1990
12	34	Dan Meyer	Rep.	52	Eagle River	2000
12	35	Donald Friske	Rep.	39	Merrill	1999
12	36	Lorraine Seratti	Rep.	51	Florence	1992
13	37	David W. Ward	Rep.	47	Oakland	1992
13	38	Steven Foti	Rep.	42	Oconomowoc	1982
13	39	Jeff Fitzgerald	Rep.	34	Beaver Dam	2000
14	40	Jean Hundertmark	Rep.	46	Larrabee	1998
14	41	Luther Olsen	Rep.	49	Aurora	1994
14	42	Joan Wade (res. Aug. 31, 2001)	Rep.	38	Montello	1998
14	42	Jacob Hines (from Nov. 16, 2001 )	Rep.	74	Oxford	2001
15	43	Neal Kedzie	Rep.	44	La Grange	1996
15	44	Wayne W. Wood	Dem.	70	Janesville	1976
15	45	Dan Schooff	Dem.	29	Beloit	1998
16	46	Tom Hebl	Dem.	55	Sun Prairie	1996
16	47	Eugene Hahn	Rep.	71	Springvale	1990
16	48	Mark F. Miller	Dem.	57	Monona	1998
17	49	Gabe Loeffelholz	Rep.	60	Platteville	2000
17	50	Sheryl Albers	Rep.	46	Westfield	1991
17	51	Stephen Freese	Rep.	40	Dodgeville	1990
18	52	John F. Townsend	Rep.	62	Fond du Lac	1998
18	53	Carol Owens	Rep.	69	Nekimi	1992
18	54	Gregg Underheim	Rep.	50	Oshkosh	1987
19	55	Dean Kaufert	Rep.	43	Neenah	1990
19	56	Terri McCormick	Rep.	44	Appleton	2000
19	57	Steve Wieckert	Rep.	46	Appleton	1996
20	58	Michael A. Lehman	Rep.	57	Hartford	1988
20	59	Glenn Grothman	Rep.	45	West Bend	1993
20	60	Timothy Hoven (res. Aug. 1, 2002)	Rep.	37	Port Washington	1994
20	60	--Vacant from Aug. 1, 2002--				
21	61	Robert L. Turner	Dem.	53	Racine	1990
21	62	John Lehman	Dem.	55	Racine	1996
21	63	Bonnie Ladwig	Rep.	61	Mount Pleasant	1992
22	64	James Kreuser	Dem.	45	Kenosha	1993
22	65	John Steinbrink	Dem.	51	Pleasant Prairie	1996
22	66	Samantha Starzyk	Rep.	26	Randall	2000
23	67	Tom Sykora	Rep.	54	Eagle Point	1996
23	68	Larry Balow	Dem.	57	Eau Claire	1998
23	69	Scott Suder	Rep.	32	Abbotsford	1998
24	70	MaryAnn Lippert	Rep.	47	Pittsville	2000
24	71	Julie Lassa	Dem.	30	Plover	1998
24	72	Marlin Schneider	Dem.	58	Wisconsin Rapids	1970
25	73	Frank Boyle	Dem.	55	Summit	1986
25	74	Gary E. Sherman	Dem.	51	Port Wing	1998
25	75	Mary Hubler	Dem.	48	Rice Lake	1984
26	76	Terese Berceau	Dem.	50	Madison	1998
26	77	Spencer Black	Dem.	50	Madison	1984
26	78	Mark Pocan	Dem.	36	Madison	1998
27	79	Rick Skindrud	Rep.	56	Primrose	1993
27	80	Mike Powers	Rep.	38	Albany	1994
27	81	David Travis	Dem.	52	Madison	1978
28	82	Jeff Stone	Rep.	39	Greenfield	1998
28	83	Scott Gunderson	Rep.	44	Norway	1994
28	84	Mark Gundrum	Rep.	30	New Berlin	1998
29	85	Gregory Huber	Dem.	44	Wausau	1988
29	86	Jerry Petrowski	Rep.	40	Stettin	1998
29	87	Martin Reynolds	Dem.	50	Ladysmith	1990
30	88	Judy Krawczyk	Rep.	61	Green Bay	2000
30	89	John Gard	Rep.	37	Peshtigo	1987
30	90	John Joseph Ryba	Dem.	71	Green Bay	1992
31	91	Barbara Gronemus	Dem.	69	Whitehall	1982
31	92	Terry Musser	Rep.	53	Irving	1984
31	93	Robin Kreibich	Rep.	41	Eau Claire	1992
32	94	Michael Huebsch	Rep.	36	West Salem	1994
32	95	Jennifer Shilling	Dem.	31	La Crosse	2000
32	96	DuWayne Johnsrud	Rep.	57	Eastman	1984
33	97	Peggy Krusick	Dem.	44	Milwaukee	1983
33	98	Marc C. Duff	Rep.	39	New Berlin	1988
33	99	Frank Urban	Rep.	70	Brookfield	1989
