= 2022 Kenosha County Executive election =

- April 5, 2022

Nominee	Samantha Kerkman	Rebecca Matoska-Mentink
Party	Nonpartisan	Nonpartisan
Popular vote	14,693	13,886
Percentage	51.32%	48.50%
County Executive before election
James Kreuser
Nonpartisan
Elected County Executive
Samantha Kerkman
Nonpartisan

The 2022 Kenosha County Executive election took place on April 5, 2022 to elect the County Executive of Kenosha County, Wisconsin, US. Incumbent County Executive James Kreuser declined to seek re-election to a fifth term. In the first contested election since 2002, three candidates ran to succeed Kreuser: County Circuit Court Clerk Rebecca Matoska-Mentink, State Representative Samantha Kerkman, and County Board Supervisor Jerry Gulley.

In the primary election, Matoska-Mentink played first, winning 44 percent of the vote, while Kerkman defeated Gulley for second place, receiving 38 percent of the vote to his 17 percent. Though the race was formally nonpartisan, Matoska-Mentink, a Democrat, was endorsed by Kreuser and supported by the Kenosha County Democratic Party, while Kerkman, a Republican, was supported by local Republicans.

Kerkman narrowly won the election, winning 51 percent of the vote to Matoska-Mentink's 49 percent, becoming the first female County Executive in county history and the first Republican to be elected to the office.

== Primary election ==
=== Candidates ===
- Rebecca Matoska-Mentink, County Clerk of the Circuit Court
- Samantha Kerkman, State Representative
- Jerry Gulley, County Supervisor

==== Declined ====
- James Kreuser, incumbent County Executive

=== Results ===
Primary election results
Party	Candidate	Votes	%
Nonpartisan	Rebecca Matoska-Mentink	6,200	44.42%
Nonpartisan	Samantha Kerkman	5,298	37.96%
Nonpartisan	Jerry Gulley	2,438	17.47%
Write-in		22	0.16%
Total votes		13,958	100.00%

== General election ==
=== Results ===
2022 Kenosha County Executive election
Party	Candidate	Votes	%
Nonpartisan	Samantha Kerkman	14,693	51.32%
Nonpartisan	Rebecca Matoska-Mentink	13,886	48.50%
Write-in		51	0.18%
Total votes		28,630	100.00%
