= Jacob Hines =

American politician, veterinarian, and beef farmer (1927–2020)

Jacob Albert "Doc" Hines

Member of the Wisconsin State Assembly from the 42nd district
- In office November 16, 2001 – January 5, 2009
- Preceded by: Joan Wade
- Succeeded by: Fred Clark

Personal details
- Born: May 1, 1927 West Salem, Ohio
- Died: March 3, 2020 (aged 92) Texas
- Party: Republican
- Spouse(s): Genevieve Mantz; Pamela Ravines
- Children: 5
- Education: Ohio State University
- Profession: Politician, veterinarian, beef farmer

Jacob Albert "Doc" Hines (May 1, 1927 – March 3, 2020) was an American politician, veterinarian, and beef farmer.

Hines was born in West Salem, Ohio on May 1, 1927, and graduated from Homer High School in Homerville, Ohio. Hines served in the U.S. Army from 1945 to 1947 before returning to attended college. He received a Doctor of Veterinary Medicine from Ohio State University in 1953.

Hines moved to Oxford, Wisconsin, where he worked as a veterinarian and beef farmer. He served on the school board for the Westfield School District from 1969 to 1981. He was elected to the Wisconsin State Assembly in 2001 special election. He won re-election in 2002, 2004, and 2006. He was defeated in the 2008 election by Democrat Fred Clark.

Hines retired from his veterinary practice in 2004. In 2012, Hines moved to Texas and died there at the age of 92 on March 3, 2020.

== Electoral history ==
=== Wisconsin Assembly (1998) ===
Year	Election	Date	Elected				Defeated				Total	Plurality
1998 (special)	Primary	Dec. 16 (1997)	Joan Wade Spillner	Republican	1,502	25.52%	J.A. Hines	Rep.	1,067	18.13%	5,886	435
1998 (special)	Primary	Dec. 16 (1997)	Joan Wade Spillner	Republican	1,502	25.52%	Cathy Lathrop	Rep.	977	16.60%	5,886	435
1998 (special)	Primary	Dec. 16 (1997)	Joan Wade Spillner	Republican	1,502	25.52%	Scott Harold Southworth	Rep.	920	15.63%	5,886	435
1998 (special)	Primary	Dec. 16 (1997)	Joan Wade Spillner	Republican	1,502	25.52%	Bart Olson	Rep.	542	9.21%	5,886	435
1998 (special)	Primary	Dec. 16 (1997)	Joan Wade Spillner	Republican	1,502	25.52%	Jim Bowers	Rep.	361	6.13%	5,886	435
1998 (special)	Primary	Dec. 16 (1997)	Joan Wade Spillner	Republican	1,502	25.52%	Anna Lorge-Morgan	Rep.	178	3.02%	5,886	435
1998 (special)	Primary	Dec. 16 (1997)	Joan Wade Spillner	Republican	1,502	25.52%	Marc Gumz	Rep.	133	2.26%	5,886	435
1998 (special)	Primary	Dec. 16 (1997)	Joan Wade Spillner	Republican	1,502	25.52%	Ed Shields	Rep.	114	1.94%	5,886	435
1998 (special)	Primary	Dec. 16 (1997)	Joan Wade Spillner	Republican	1,502	25.52%	Frank Cook	Rep.	92	1.56%	5,886	435

=== Wisconsin Assembly (2001–2008) ===
Year	Election	Date	Elected				Defeated				Total	Plurality
2001 (special)	Primary	Oct. 9	J.A. Hines	Republican	1,104	28.66%	Bob Van Abel	Rep.	890	23.11%	3,852	214
2001 (special)	Primary	Oct. 9	J.A. Hines	Republican	1,104	28.66%	Lance Burri	Rep.	873	22.67%	3,852	214
2001 (special)	Primary	Oct. 9	J.A. Hines	Republican	1,104	28.66%	Dave Ament	Rep.	556	14.43%	3,852	214
2001 (special)	Primary	Oct. 9	J.A. Hines	Republican	1,104	28.66%	Bill Lorge	Rep.	324	8.41%	3,852	214
2001 (special)	Primary	Oct. 9	J.A. Hines	Republican	1,104	28.66%	Frank Cook	Rep.	101	2.62%	3,852	214
2001 (special)	General	Nov. 6	J.A. Hines	Republican	4,997	56.62%	Tim Henney	Dem.	3,801	43.06%	8,826	696
2002	General	Nov. 5	J.A. Hines (inc)	Republican	11,632	99.22%	--Unopposed--				11,723	11,541
2004	General	Nov. 2	J.A. Hines (inc)	Republican	14,211	52.40%	Tim Henney	Dem.	12,893	47.54%	27,119	1,318
2006	General	Nov. 7	J.A. Hines (inc)	Republican	10,989	53.50%	Tim Henney	Dem.	9,535	46.42%	20,541	1,454
2008	General	Nov. 4	Fred Clark	Democratic	15,936	58.47%	J.A. Hines (inc)	Rep.	11,304	41.47%	27,257	4,632
