= Hertel, Wisconsin =

- Unincorporated community
- Location within Wisconsin Location within the United States
- Coordinates: 45°48′31″N 92°10′31″W
- Country: United States
- State: Wisconsin
- County: Burnett
- Town: La Follette
- Elevation: 1,037 ft (316 m)
- Time zone: UTC-6 (Central (CST))
  - Summer (DST): UTC-5 (CDT)
- ZIP code: 54845
- Area codes: 715 & 534
- GNIS feature ID: 1566330

Hertel is an unincorporated community in the town of La Follette, Burnett County, Wisconsin, United States. It is along Wisconsin Highway 70. Hertel is 14 miles west of Spooner and 12 miles east of Siren.

The community was named for its first postmaster, Otto Hertel, who opened the post office in July 1898. The post office closed on September 13, 1997.
