= Sarah Waukau =

American politician

Sarah Waukau (born April 3, 1947) was a member of the Wisconsin State Assembly.

Born in Antigo, Wisconsin. She would graduate from the University of Wisconsin-Eau Claire. Waukau is a widow with two children.

== Career ==
Waukau was elected to the Assembly in 1999 in a special election following the resignation of Thomas D. Ourada. She was a member of the Antigo City Council from 1990 to 1992 and again from 1995 to 1999. Waukau is a Democrat.
