= Robert K. Zukowski =

American politician (1930–2015)

Robert Kenneth Zukowski (April 24, 1930 – June 1, 2015) was a Wisconsin dairy farmer, dairy field representative, and politician.

Born in the Town of Reseburg, Zukowski graduated from Thorp High School. He served in the United States Army in France, from 1954 to 1956. Zukowski served on the Thorp School Board from 1970 to 1973 and was the treasurer. He then served in the Wisconsin State Assembly from 1993 until 1999 and was a Republican. Zukowski died in Marshfield, Wisconsin.
