= Student Association at UWM =

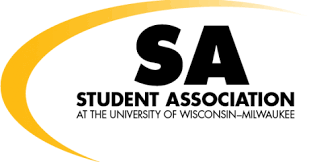
- Logo of the Student Association at UWM
- Type: Student Governance Body
- President: Jeremi Lukos
- Vice President of Student Affairs: Levi Valentine
- Vice President of Academic Affairs: TBD
- Chairperson of the SA Oversight and Appeals Commission: Rasheeda Parveen
- Formerly called: Commonwealth Executive Board, Wisconsin Student Government, University Student Government

The Student Association or SA is the official university recognized governance body for the students of the University of Wisconsin–Milwaukee. The SA is organized in accordance with Wis. Stats. § 36.09(5) to advocate on students' behalf; coordinate policy regarding student life, services, and interests at the University of Wisconsin–Milwaukee; and allocate a portion of Segregated University Fees. (SA Const. Article XII).

== Mission ==
"... to enrich the student experience at UWM, through representation, advocacy, and the funding of services and activities that improve student life." (SA Const. Preamble).
