= La Follette, Wisconsin =

- Town
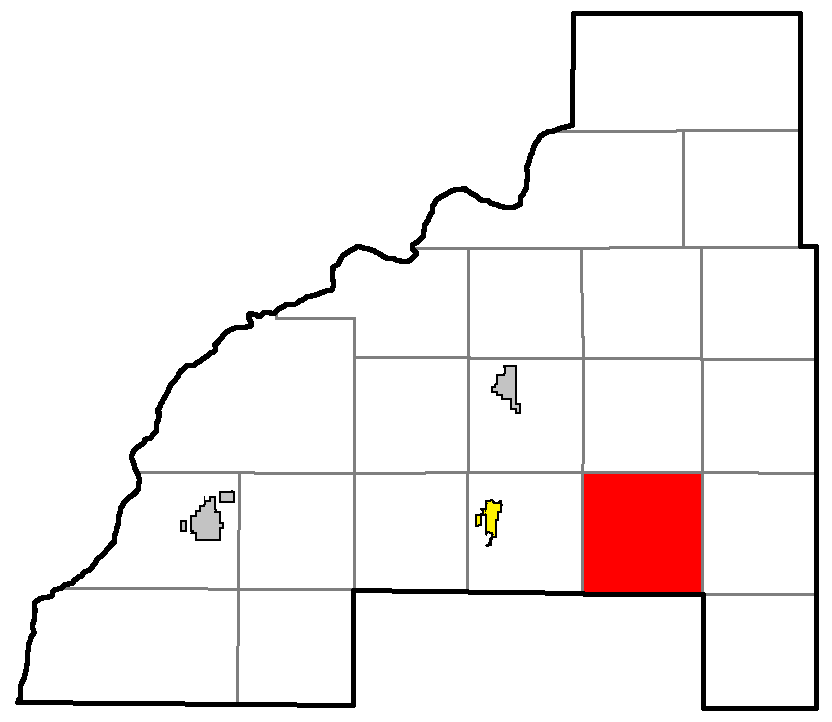
- Location of La Follette, within Burnett County
- Coordinates: 45°47′12″N 92°13′41″W
- Country: United States
- State: Wisconsin
- County: Burnett
- founded: 1901

Area
  - Total: 39.0 sq mi (101.0 km^{2})
  - Land: 37.1 sq mi (96.0 km^{2})
  - Water: 1.9 sq mi (5.0 km^{2})
- Elevation: 965 ft (294 m)

Population (2020)
  - Total: 559
  - Density: 15.1/sq mi (5.82/km^{2})
- Time zone: UTC-6 (Central (CST))
  - Summer (DST): UTC-5 (CDT)
- Area codes: 715 & 534
- FIPS code: 55-40975
- GNIS feature ID: 1583505

La Follette is a town in Burnett County in the U.S. state of Wisconsin. The population was 559 at the 2020 census. The unincorporated communities of Coomer and Hertel are located in the town.

== History ==
The town is named for U.S. senator and Wisconsin governor Robert M. La Follette.

== Geography ==
La Follette is located along the southern border of Burnett County, with Polk County to the south. According to the United States Census Bureau, the town has a total area of 39.0 square miles (101.0 km^{2}), of which 37.1 square miles (96.0 km^{2}) is land and 1.9 square miles (5.0 km^{2}), or 4.96%, is water.

== Demographics ==
As of the census of 2000, there were 511 people, 220 households, and 150 families residing in the town. The population density was 13.8 people per square mile (5.3/km^{2}). There were 490 housing units at an average density of 13.2 per square mile (5.1/km^{2}). The racial makeup of the town was 74.95% White, 0.39% African American, 22.70% Native American, and 1.96% from two or more races. Hispanic or Latino of any race were 0.39% of the population.

There were 220 households, out of which 24.1% had children under the age of 18 living with them, 50.5% were married couples living together, 10.0% had a female householder with no husband present, and 31.4% were non-families. 25.9% of all households were made up of individuals, and 14.1% had someone living alone who was 65 years of age or older. The average household size was 2.32 and the average family size was 2.70.

In the town, the population was spread out, with 20.9% under the age of 18, 7.0% from 18 to 24, 22.5% from 25 to 44, 28.6% from 45 to 64, and 20.9% who were 65 years of age or older. The median age was 45 years. For every 100 females, there were 98.1 males. For every 100 females age 18 and over, there were 94.2 males.

The median income for a household in the town was $30,104, and the median income for a family was $32,708. Males had a median income of $25,000 versus $27,188 for females. The per capita income for the town was $18,129. About 5.5% of families and 9.2% of the population were below the poverty line, including 16.0% of those under age 18 and 2.9% of those age 65 or over.
