= Elderon (town), Wisconsin =

Town in Marathon County, Wisconsin

Elderon, Wisconsin
- Town
- Town of Elderon
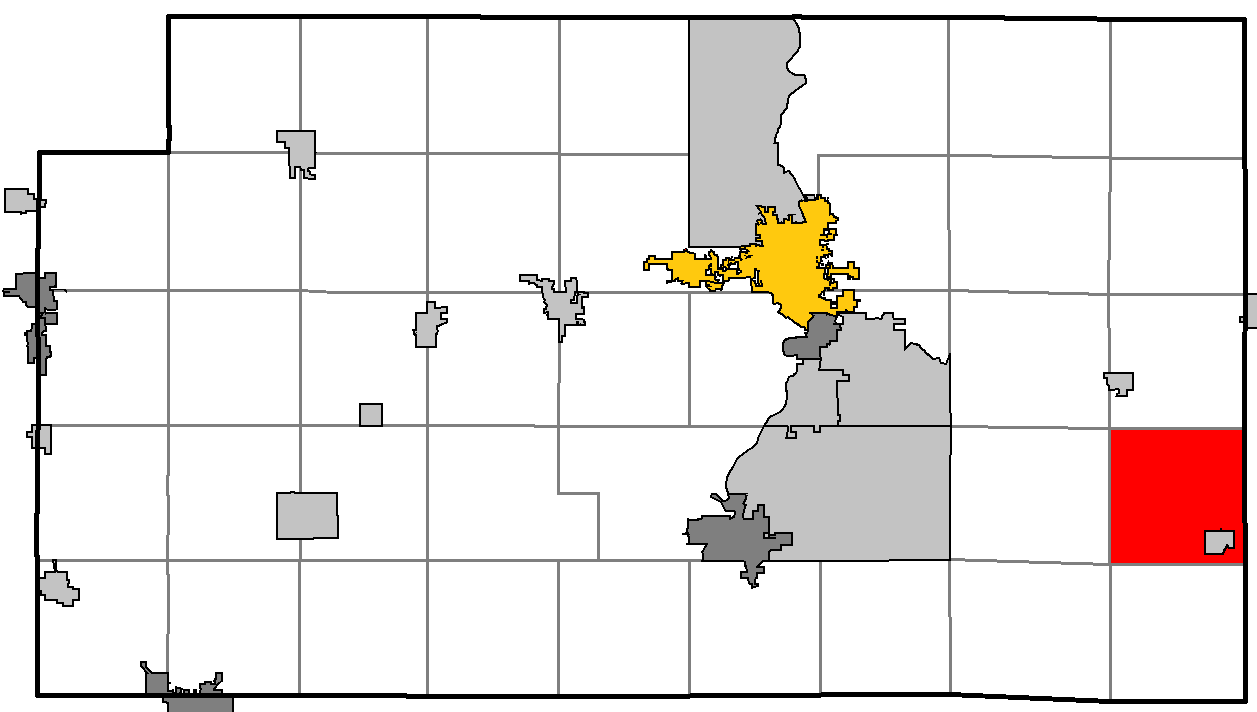
- Location of Elderon, Marathon County

- Location of Marathon County, Wisconsin
- Coordinates: 44°47′00″N 89°15′11″W
- Country: United States
- State: Wisconsin
- County: Marathon

Area
  - Total: 34.99 sq mi (90.6 km^{2})
  - Land: 34.57 sq mi (89.5 km^{2})
  - Water: 0.42 sq mi (1.1 km^{2})

Population (2020)
  - Total: 644
  - Density: 18.6/sq mi (7.19/km^{2})
- Time zone: UTC-6 (Central (CST))
  - Summer (DST): UTC-5 (CDT)
- Area code(s): 715 and 534
- GNIS feature ID: 1583144

Elderon is a town in Marathon County, Wisconsin, United States. It is part of the Wausau, Wisconsin Metropolitan Statistical Area. The population was 644 at the 2020 census. The unincorporated community of Ingersoll is located in the town.

== Geography ==
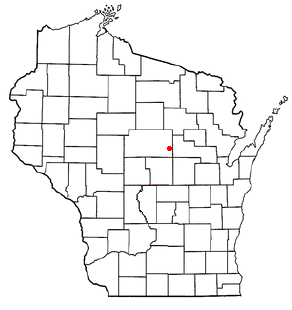
Location of xxx, Wisconsin

According to the United States Census Bureau, the town has a total area of 34.9 square miles (90.4 km^{2}), of which 34.6 square miles (89.6 km^{2}) is land and 0.3 square miles (0.8 km^{2}), or 0.89%, is water.

== Demographics ==
At the 2000 census there were 567 people, 224 households, and 161 families living in the town. The population density was 16.4 people per square mile (6.3/km^{2}). There were 260 housing units at an average density of 7.5 per square mile (2.9/km^{2}). The racial makeup of the town was 97.00% White, 1.06% Native American, 0.53% Asian, 0.88% from other races, and 0.53% from two or more races. 1.23% of the population were Hispanic or Latino of any race. Of the 224 households 33.5% had children under the age of 18 living with them, 65.6% were married couples living together, 5.4% had a female householder with no husband present, and 27.7% were non-families. 23.2% of households were one person and 6.7% were one person aged 65 or older. The average household size was 2.53 and the average family size was 3.03.

The age distribution was 24.3% under the age of 18, 4.8% from 18 to 24, 29.3% from 25 to 44, 28.4% from 45 to 64, and 13.2% 65 or older. The median age was 40 years. For every 100 females, there were 109.2 males. For every 100 females age 18 and over, there were 114.5 males.

The median household income was $36,667 and the median family income was $47,639. Males had a median income of $31,250 versus $20,694 for females. The per capita income for the town was $15,968. About 4.0% of families and 5.5% of the population were below the poverty line, including none of those under age 18 and 13.5% of those age 65 or over.

== Notable people ==
- Laurence J. Day, farmer, electrical contractor, and politician
