= Tom Sykora =

American politician

Tom Sykora (born August 6, 1946) is a Wisconsin legislator and business owner.

Born in Chippewa Falls, Wisconsin, Sykora is a business owner and Vietnam War veteran. Sykora was elected to the Wisconsin State Assembly in 1994. Sykora served in the Wisconsin State Assembly from 1995 until his retirement in 2003. He attended the University of Wisconsin-River Falls and the University of Wisconsin-Eau Claire.
