= Shirley Krug =

American politician

Minority Leader of the Wisconsin Assembly
- In office June 3, 1998 – May 1, 2001
- Preceded by: Walter Kunicki
- Succeeded by: Spencer Black

Member of the Wisconsin State Assembly
- In office January 4, 1993 – January 3, 2005
- Preceded by: Barbara Notestein
- Succeeded by: Fred Kessler
- Constituency: 12th district
- In office January 7, 1985 – January 4, 1993
- Preceded by: Walter Kunicki
- Succeeded by: Jeannette Bell
- Constituency: 15th district

Personal details
- Born: January 29, 1958 (age 68) Milwaukee, Wisconsin
- Party: Democratic
- Education: University of Wisconsin–Milwaukee (B.S., M.S.)

Shirley Krug (born January 29, 1958) is an American politician and public administrator from Wisconsin. A member of the Democratic Party, she represented Milwaukee in the Wisconsin State Assembly for 20 years, and was the first woman to serve as Democratic leader in the Wisconsin Legislature when she served nearly three years as Minority Leader.

== Early life and education ==
Born in Milwaukee, Wisconsin, Krug graduated from Milwaukee's John Marshall High School in 1975. She continued her education at the University of Wisconsin–Milwaukee earning her B.S. in economics, psychology, and anthropology in 1981 and M.S. in economics in 1983.

== Career ==
=== Academic ===
Krug was an adjunct professor of economics at the University of Wisconsin–Parkside before becoming a Member of Board Directors of the German American National Congress. She then served on the Lincoln Creek Steering Committee, the Friends of Havenwoods, Sierra Club, The Nature Conservancy, and on both Alumni and Student Association at UWM. While serving on those committees she was a recipient of numerous awards from Alliance for the Mentally Ill, the Lutheran Social Services, the Women's Network, the Environmental Decade and the Coalition Against Domestic Violence.

=== Assembly Member ===
Shirley Krug was elected to the Wisconsin State Assembly in 1984 and served from 1985 until 2005. During her time in office she was responsible for passing such legislations as Prevention of Child Abuse and Neglect, Crime Victims Rights' Enabling Legislation, reforms on Children in Need of Protection or Services and temporary restraining orders, Mental Health Consumer Protection Act, Full Funding for Earned Income Tax Credit and Mandatory Arrest for Domestic Violence.

In 1998, when long-serving Democratic floor leader Walter Kunicki announced he would stand down from his leadership role, Krug was elected as his successor, narrowly defeating Kenosha representative James Kreuser. Following the Democrat's disappointment in the 2000 election, however, Krug's leadership was challenged and, in May 2001, she was replaced by Madison representative Spencer Black. Her defeat as leader was seen as a repudiation of the Democratic Leadership Council, which she was perceived to be aligned with.

Shortly after losing her leadership post, Krug was embroiled in a minor scandal in the Legislature in which several legislators of both parties were implicated in the use of state resources on political activity, though no charges or reprimands occurred as a result of the investigation.

In 2004, Krug announced she would not seek re-election for the Assembly, but would instead run for United States House of Representatives in the 4th congressional district, where Jerry Kleczka had just announced his plans to retire. Krug, however, abandoned her congressional campaign after EMILY's List endorsed her Democratic primary opponent, Gwen Moore.

== Later years ==
Since leaving the Assembly, Krug has worked at a number of administrative jobs in the City of Milwaukee, as a commissioner for the Milwaukee Metropolitan Sewage District, as budget chief for Milwaukee's Department of Public Works, and as a commissioner on Milwaukee's Social Development Commission.

Wisconsin State Assembly
Preceded by Walter Kunicki	Member of the Wisconsin State Assembly from the 12th district January 7, 1985 – January 4, 1993	Succeeded by Jeannette Bell
Preceded by Barbara Notestein	Member of the Wisconsin State Assembly from the 15th district January 4, 1993 – January 3, 2005	Succeeded by Fred Kessler
Preceded by Walter Kunicki	Minority Leader of the Wisconsin State Assembly; June 3, 1998 – May 1, 2001	Succeeded by Spencer Black
