= Joe Handrick =

American politician (born 1965)

Joe Handrick (born November 2, 1965, in Minocqua, Wisconsin) was a member of the Wisconsin State Assembly and later Town Chairman in the Town of Minocqua. He graduated from Lakeland Union High School and the University of Wisconsin–Madison with a degree in Occupational Therapy. He is married and has three children.

== Career ==
Handrick was first elected to the Assembly in 1994 and re-elected in 1996 and 1998. Handrick was appointed Minocqua Town Chairman in January 2006 following the resignation of Chairman Don Gauger. Handrick was re-elected to this post in 2007 and 2009. Additionally, he was a member of the Oneida County, Wisconsin Board from 1994 to 1996 and a member of the Lakeland High School Board of Education from 2008 to 2011. He is a Republican.
