= Judith Klusman =

American politician

Judith Klusman is a former member of the Wisconsin State Assembly 1989-2000. She is also a current County Commissioner for Rowan County in North Carolina.

== Biography ==
Klusman was born on December 14, 1956, in Neenah, Wisconsin. She graduated from Winneconne High School, attended Concordia College and graduated in 2004 from Wartburg Theological Seminary. Klusman is married with two children.

== Career ==
Klusman was first elected to the Assembly in 1989 and became Assistant Majority Leader in 1995. She is a Republican. She became a pastor in the Evangelical Lutheran Church in America in 2004.

Klusman was elected to the Rowan County Commission in 2014. Klusman won the election by around one hundred votes.
