= Reseburg, Wisconsin =

- Town
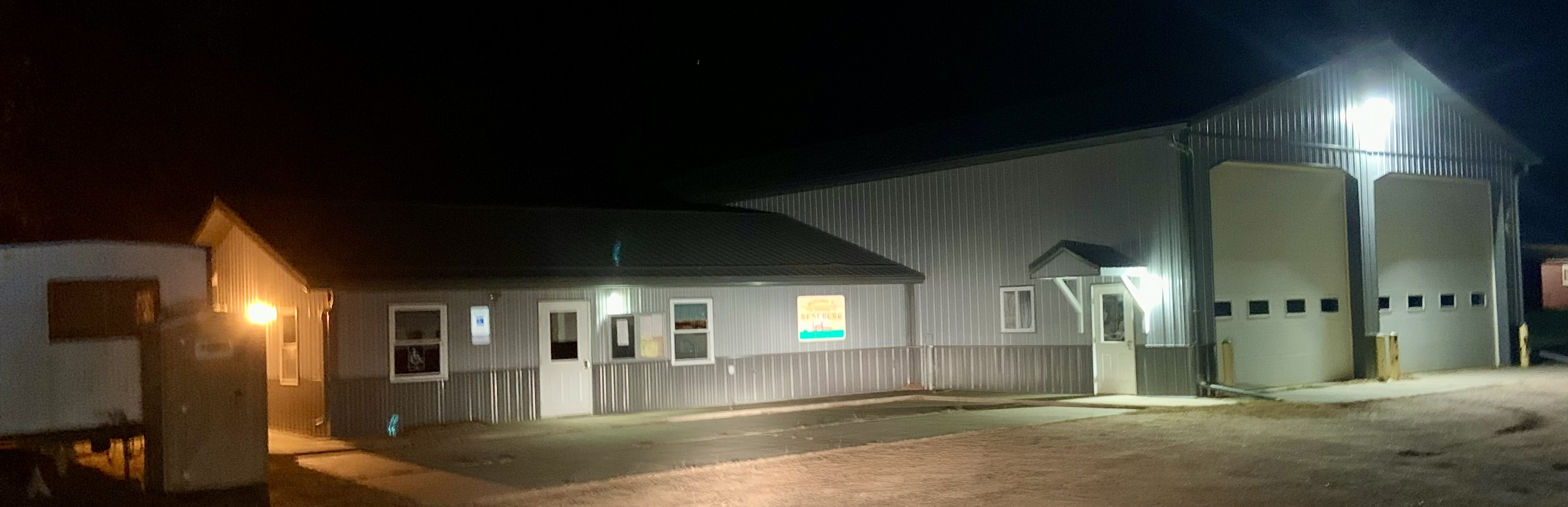
- Town hall

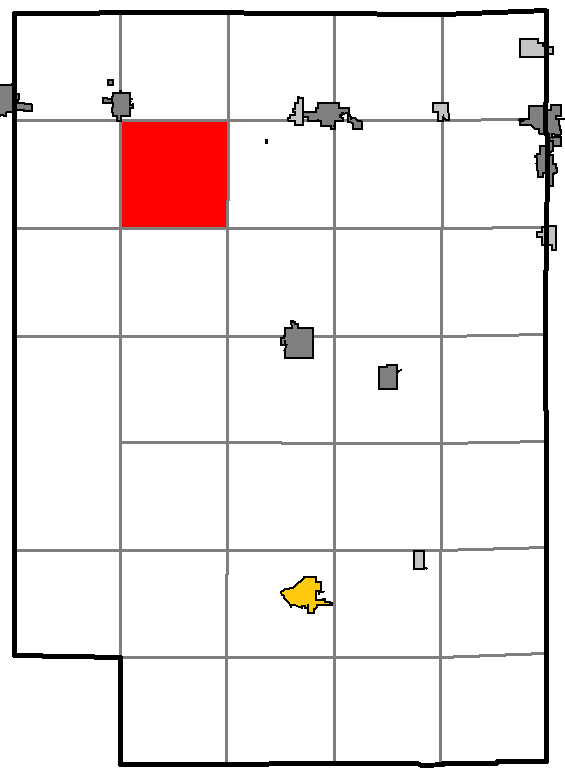
- Location of Reseburg, Clark County

- Location of Clark County, Wisconsin
- Coordinates: 44°54′N 90°44′W
- Country: United States
- State: Wisconsin
- County: Clark

Area
  - Total: 35.9 sq mi (93.1 km^{2})
  - Land: 35.9 sq mi (93.1 km^{2})
  - Water: 0 sq mi (0.0 km^{2})
- Elevation: 1,161 ft (354 m)

Population (2020)
  - Total: 793
  - Density: 22.1/sq mi (8.52/km^{2})
- Time zone: UTC-6 (Central (CST))
  - Summer (DST): UTC-5 (CDT)
- Area codes: 715 & 534
- FIPS code: 55-67025
- GNIS feature ID: 1584011

Reseburg is a town in Clark County in the U.S. state of Wisconsin. The population was 793 at the 2020 census.

== Geography ==
According to the United States Census Bureau, the town has a total area of 35.9 square miles (93.1 km^{2}), all land.

== Demographics ==
As of the census of 2000, there were 740 people, 206 households, and 173 families residing in the town. The population density was 20.6 people per square mile (7.9/km^{2}). There were 221 housing units at an average density of 6.1 per square mile (2.4/km^{2}). The racial makeup of the town was 99.05% White, and 0.95% from two or more races. Hispanic or Latino of any race were 0.14% of the population.

There were 206 households, out of which 50.0% had children under the age of 18 living with them, 72.8% were married couples living together, 6.3% had a female householder with no husband present, and 16.0% were non-families. 11.2% of all households were made up of individuals, and 4.9% had someone living alone who was 65 years of age or older. The average household size was 3.59 and the average family size was 3.99.

In the town, the population was spread out, with 39.9% under the age of 18, 9.9% from 18 to 24, 23.0% from 25 to 44, 17.7% from 45 to 64, and 9.6% who were 65 years of age or older. The median age was 25 years. For every 100 females, there were 98.4 males. For every 100 females age 18 and over, there were 108.9 males.

The median income for a household in the town was $34,750, and the median income for a family was $38,472. Males had a median income of $21,902 versus $16,667 for females. The per capita income for the town was $12,377. About 7.2% of families and 9.4% of the population were below the poverty line, including 9.0% of those under age 18 and 10.3% of those age 65 or over.
