= Spencer Black =

American politician

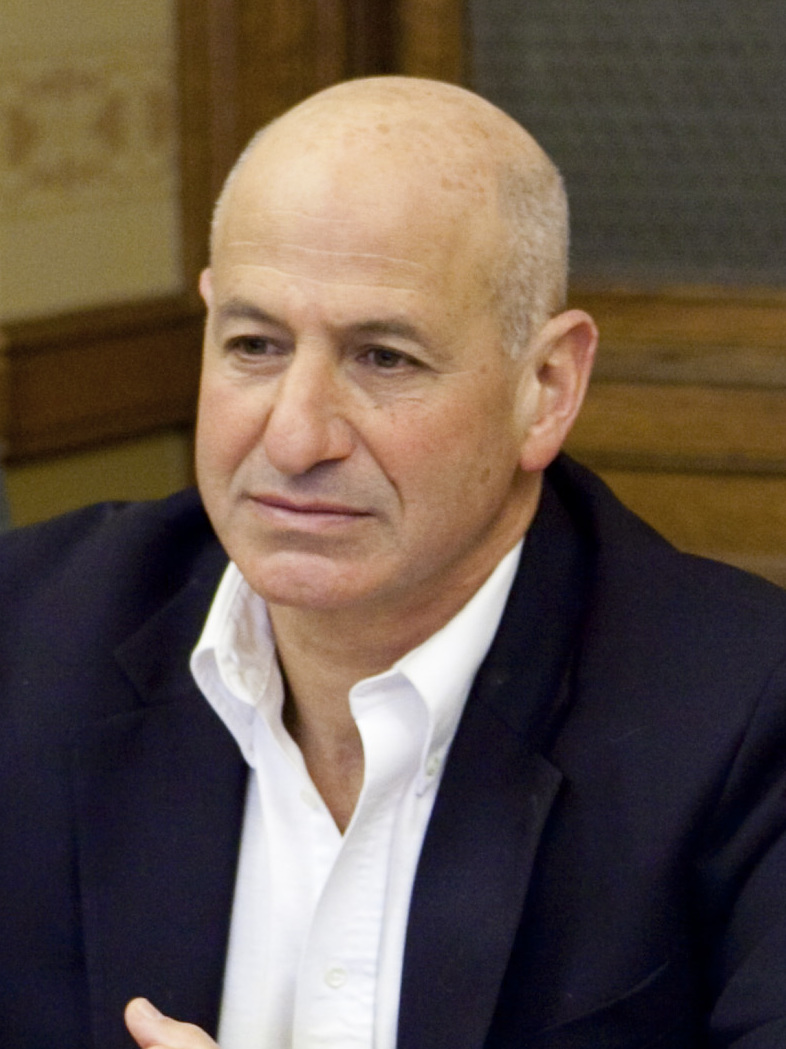
- Black in 2009

Minority Leader of the Wisconsin Assembly
- In office May 1, 2001 – November 13, 2002
- Preceded by: Shirley Krug
- Succeeded by: James Kreuser

Member of the Wisconsin State Assembly from the 77th district
- In office January 7, 1985 – January 3, 2011
- Preceded by: Calvin Potter
- Succeeded by: Brett Hulsey

Personal details
- Born: May 25, 1950 (age 76) New York, New York, U.S.
- Party: Democratic
- Spouse: Pam
- Children: 1 son
- Education: Stony Brook University; University of Wisconsin–Madison (M.S., M.P.P., M.P.A.)
- Profession: educator, politician

Spencer Black (born May 25, 1950) is an American educator and retired politician. A member of the Democratic Party, he represented Madison in the Wisconsin State Assembly for 26 years, and was Minority Leader for most of the 2001-2002 session.

== Early life and education ==
Born in New York City in 1951, Black graduated from New York's Stuyvesant High School and received his bachelor's degree in economics and history from the State University of New York at Stony Brook. He moved to Wisconsin to attend the University of Wisconsin–Madison for graduate studies, receiving his first master's degree in urban and regional planning in 1980, and receiving his Master of Public Policy and Public Administration in 1981.

He worked as a high school teacher and coach, as Curator of Education of the Wisconsin Historical Society and as a conservationist for the Sierra Club.

== Wisconsin Assembly ==
He was first elected to the Assembly in 1984 and was subsequently re-elected twelve times. In 1998, Black endorsed Kenosha representative James Kreuser in his unsuccessful bid for Democratic Minority Leader. A few years later, following Democrats' disappointment with the results of the 2000 election, Black challenged Marlin Schneider for the role of Assistant Minority Leader and won a surprising upset victory. He worked with Kreuser over the next few months to bring a challenge to Minority Leader Shirley Krug, culminating in their May 2001 victory in which Black was elected Minority Leader and Kreuser Assistant Minority Leader. Their victory was seen as a repudiation of the Democratic Leadership Council in Wisconsin, which some in the caucus blamed for a strategy which saw Democrats stuck in the minority. Black relinquished his leadership role after less than one session, endorsing Kreuser as his successor.

He served for many years as the Chair of the Assembly Natural Resources Committee. He authored numerous environmental laws including the Knowles-Nelson Stewardship Fund, the Mining Moratorium law, the Lower Wisconsin Riverway, the statewide recycling program, and the endangered species matching grant program.

== Later years ==
He is currently a Professor of Urban and Regional Planning at the University of Wisconsin-Madison and was Vice President of the 2014 board of directors for the Sierra Club, one of the nation's oldest and most prestigious environmental activists agencies. He continues to reside in Madison and often writes as an opinion columnist for The Capital Times.

Wisconsin State Assembly
Preceded by Calvin Potter	Member of the Wisconsin State Assembly from the 77th district January 7, 1985 – January 3, 2011	Succeeded by Brett Hulsey
Preceded by Shirley Krug	Minority Leader of the Wisconsin State Assembly; May 1, 2001 – November 13, 2002	Succeeded by James Kreuser
