= Thomas D. Ourada =

American politician

Thomas D. Ourada is a former member of the Wisconsin State Assembly.

== Biography ==
Ourada was born on December 17, 1958, in Antigo, Wisconsin. He graduated from Marquette University in 1981 and attended the University of Kentucky.

== Career ==
Ourada was first elected to the Assembly in 1984. In 1999, Ourada resigned from the Assembly. A special election was held to fill his vacancy, won by Sarah Waukau. Ourada is a Republican.
