= Stephen Freese =

American politician (1960–2024)

Stephen Freese (March 16, 1960 – August 28, 2024) was an American Republican politician from Wisconsin.

== Life and career ==
Born in Dubuque, Iowa, he went to high school in Hazel Green, Wisconsin and graduated from University of Wisconsin–Platteville. He served as a town officer and on the Grant County, Wisconsin. Freese served in the Wisconsin State Assembly from 1991 until 2007, when he was defeated in 2006.

Freese died from cancer on August 28, 2024, at the age of 64.
