= James Kreuser =

American politician in Wisconsin

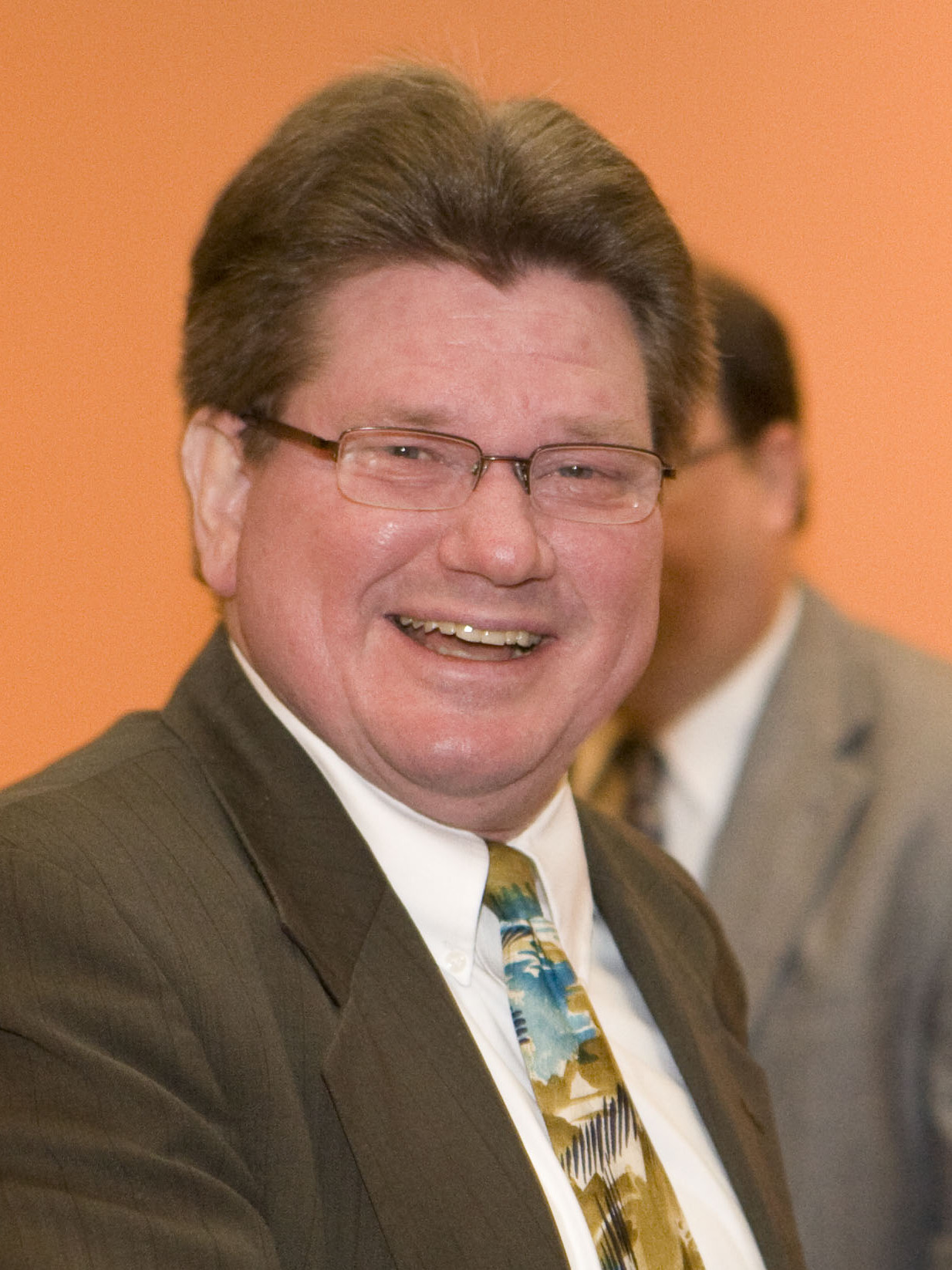
- Kreuser in 2008

County Executive of Kenosha County, Wisconsin
- In office June 12, 2008 – April 19, 2022
- Preceded by: Allan Kehl
- Succeeded by: Samantha Kerkman

Minority Leader of the Wisconsin State Assembly
- In office November 13, 2002 – January 5, 2009
- Preceded by: Spencer Black
- Succeeded by: Jeff Fitzgerald

Member of the Wisconsin State Assembly from the 64th district
- In office September 13, 1993 – January 5, 2009
- Preceded by: Peter W. Barca
- Succeeded by: Peter W. Barca

Personal details
- Born: May 20, 1961 (age 65) Kenosha, Wisconsin
- Party: Democratic
- Spouse: Jane
- Children: 2 sons
- Education: University of Wisconsin–Parkside (B.A., M.P.A.)
- Occupation: Politician

James E. "Jim" Kreuser (born May 20, 1961) is an American politician and former County Executive for Kenosha County, Wisconsin, serving from 2008 to 2022. A member of the Democratic Party, he previously represented Kenosha in the Wisconsin State Assembly for 15 years (1993–2008) and was the Assembly Minority Leader from 2003 through 2008.

== Early life ==
James Kreuser was born and raised in Kenosha, Wisconsin. He graduated from George Nelson Tremper High School in 1979 and earned his bachelor's degree in political science from Kenosha's University of Wisconsin–Parkside in 1983. He continued his education at Parkside and received his Master's in Public Administration in 1986.

== State Assembly ==
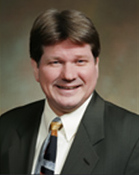
Kreuser in 2007

During his time at Parkside, Kreuser interned with Kenosha County Executive, John Collins, and, after completing his M.P.A., was hired as a full-time administrative assistant in the county executive's office. Kreuser later credited the experience he received working in the county executive's office, getting to know the county and state government, with enabling his success as a legislator.

He was still working for the county executive when, in 1993, a chain of events—starting with the appointment of local-area congressman Les Aspin to join the cabinet of newly inaugurated President Bill Clinton—resulted in a vacancy in the Wisconsin State Assembly district in which Kreuser resided. A special election was called for August 1993, and Kreuser was elected. He topped his two Democratic opponents in the primary, carrying just over 50% of the vote, then defeated his Republican general election opponent, William F. Cantwell, by a wide margin.

Kreuser went on to win re-election seven times, receiving attention and praise from his colleagues as an up-and-coming leader in the party. Senate Majority Leader Charles Chvala was quoted as saying Kreuser was, "destined to be a leader." He made his first bid for leadership in the Assembly Democratic caucus in the summer of 1998, when long-time Democratic leader Walter Kunicki stepped down from the role. Despite strong support from a geographically diverse coalition of the assembly, Kreuser fell one or two votes short of Milwaukee representative Shirley Krug, who became the first female caucus leader in state history.

In 2001, amid discontent within the caucus over the results of the 2000 election, Kreuser made a successful bid with Assistant Minority Leader Spencer Black of Madison, to challenge Krug as floor leader. Black was elevated to Minority Leader and Kreuser was elected as Assistant Minority Leader, in what was seen as a repudiation of the Democratic Leadership Council in Wisconsin.

Black stood down as leader at the end of the 2001-2002 term, and Kreuser was elected just after the 2002 election as the next Minority Leader. Over his three terms as minority leader, Democrats increased from 41 seats in the Assembly to 47.

== County Executive ==
In March 2008 another opportunity presented itself to Kreuser when Kenosha County Executive Allan Kehl announced his intention to resign his seat after being indicted for accepting illegal payments. Kreuser quickly jumped into the race, announcing his candidacy on March 25, 2008, and won the special election without opposition in June. At the time he announced his candidacy, he pledged not to run for re-election to the Assembly if he was chosen as County Executive.

Kreuser's move to vacate his Assembly leadership role was seen as a blow to Kenosha's influence in the state as Democrats were widely expected to win a majority in the upcoming 2008 election, where Kreuser would likely then become a candidate for Speaker or Majority Leader. Kreuser's successor as chairman of the Wisconsin Assembly Democratic Campaign Committee, Mark Pocan, went on to an influential career in the Assembly and has been a member of Congress since 2013.

== Personal life and family ==
Kreuser has been a member of the Danish Brotherhood in America, the Polish Legion of American Veterans, the American Association of University Women, Ducks Unlimited, and the United Food and Commercial Workers Local 1444. He has been involved with Kenosha organizations such as the Kenosha Sport Fishing and Conservation Association, the Urban League of Racine and Kenosha, the Kenosha Area Chamber of Commerce, the Boys and Girls Club of Kenosha, and the Friends of the Kenosha Public Museum.

He and his wife Jane have two adult sons.

== Electoral history ==
=== Wisconsin Assembly (1993–2008) ===
Wisconsin Assembly, 64th District Special Election, 1993
Party	Candidate	Votes	%	±%
Special Democratic Primary, August 3, 1993
Democratic	James E. Kreuser	2,832	50.73%	
Democratic	Louis I. Principe	1,640	29.37%	
Democratic	Dennis A. Shook	1,111	19.90%	
Plurality		1,192	21.35%	
Total votes		5,583	100.0%	
Special Election, August 31, 1993
Democratic	James E. Kreuser	2,940	68.01%	
Republican	William F. Cantwell	1,383	31.99%	
Plurality		1,557	36.02%	
Total votes		4,323	100.0%	-72.52%
Democratic hold				

=== Kenosha County executive (2008–2018) ===
Wisconsin State Assembly
Preceded by Peter W. Barca	Member of the Wisconsin State Assembly from the 64th district September 13, 1993 – January 5, 2009	Succeeded by Peter W. Barca
Preceded by Spencer Black	Minority Leader of the Wisconsin State Assembly; November 13, 2002 – January 5, 2009	Succeeded by Jeff Fitzgerald
Government offices
Preceded by Allan Kehl	County Executive of Kenosha County, Wisconsin; June 12, 2008 – present	Incumbent
