= John La Fave =

American politician

Member of the Wisconsin State Assembly from the 23rd district
- In office January 3, 1993 – January 6, 2003
- Preceded by: Thomas A. Hauke
- Succeeded by: Curt Gielow

Personal details
- Born: July 13, 1949 (age 77) Milwaukee, Wisconsin, U.S.
- Party: Democratic
- Children: 2
- Education: University of Wisconsin–Madison (B.S.)

John La Fave (born July 13, 1949) is an American politician who served as a member of the Wisconsin State Assembly from the 23rd district from 1993 to 2003.

== Early life and education ==
Born in Milwaukee, La Fave graduated from Wauwatosa West High School in 1967. He earned a Bachelor of Science degree in education from the University of Wisconsin in 1971.

== Career ==
He worked as a sales representative and an elementary school teacher before his 1992 election to the Wisconsin State Assembly. After leaving office in 2003, he became the register of deeds for Milwaukee County, Wisconsin. He retired in April 2019 after becoming subject to an investigation by the Federal Bureau of Investigation. He subsequently pleaded guilty to a federal felony count of wire fraud and was sentenced to two years probation and to pay $89,000 in restitution to the county for participating in a false invoicing scheme.

== Personal life ==
La Fave has practiced Transcendental Meditation since the late 1960s, and attended a special mass-meditation event at the Maharishi University of Management in Iowa held in the wake of the 9/11 attacks.
