= David Ward (Wisconsin politician) =

American politician

Member of the Wisconsin State Assembly from the 37th district
- In office January 4, 1993 – August 2, 2006
- Preceded by: Randall J. Radtke
- Succeeded by: Andy Jorgensen

Personal details
- Born: April 29, 1953 (age 73) Fort Atkinson, Wisconsin, U.S.
- Party: Republican
- Spouse: Jean
- Children: 1
- Education: University of Wisconsin–Platteville (B.S.)
- Occupation: Dairy farmer, politician, lobbyist

David W. Ward (born April 29, 1953) is a retired American dairy farmer, lobbyist, and Republican politician. He was a member of the Wisconsin State Assembly from 1993 through 2006, representing the western half of Jefferson County, and was a dairy lobbyist for Wisconsin's Cooperative Network until 2019.

== Biography ==
Born in Fort Atkinson, Wisconsin, Ward was raised on his family's dairy farm, first established at that location in 1844. He graduated from Fort Atkinson High School and went on to earn his bachelor's degree in agricultural economics from the University of Wisconsin–Platteville. After college, Ward returned to his family farm and applied some of what he had learned to the improvement of their dairy cattle herd, and the business status of their farm. Ward became active in the Jefferson County Farm Bureau, and eventually became its president. From 1987 through 1992, he was also a member of the board of directors of the Jefferson County Farmco Cooperative.

Through his involvement with the Farm Bureau, Ward became interested in politics, and, in 1992, ran for Wisconsin State Assembly in the 37th Assembly district. The district had previously been represented by Republican Randall J. Radtke, who was not seeking eighth term in the Assembly. He faced no opponent in the Republican primary, and went on to win 55% of the vote over Democrat Jane Marr in the 1992 general election. He was subsequently re-elected six times and resigned before the end of his seventh term, in August 2006.

Following his resignation, Ward became a lobbyist on dairy issues for Cooperative Network—a trade association representing the interests of cooperatives and their producer-members—and later became overall director of government relations for the network. He also became a part-time educator, teaching agricultural policy at the University of Wisconsin–Platteville.

In 2018 and 2019, he served on the Wisconsin Dairy Task Force 2.0, which worked to develop recommendations to help Wisconsin retain its status as a dairy leader.

== Electoral history ==
=== Wisconsin Assembly (1992–2004) ===
| Year | Election | Date | Elected | | | | Defeated | | | | Total | Plurality |
|---|---|---|---|---|---|---|---|---|---|---|---|---|
| 1992 | General | November 3 | David Ward | Republican | 12,963 | 55.16% | Jane Marr | Dem. | 10,538 | 44.84% | 23,501 | 2,425 |
| 1994 | General | November 8 | David Ward (inc.) | Republican | 8,897 | 61.88% | Jeff Pieterick | Dem. | 5,480 | 38.12% | 14,377 | 3,417 |
| 1996 | General | November 5 | David Ward (inc.) | Republican | 13,104 | 61.58% | Scott Waller | Dem. | 8,176 | 38.42% | 21,280 | 4,928 |
| 1998 | General | November 3 | David Ward (inc.) | Republican | 12,686 | 100.0% | | | | | 12,686 | 12,686 |
| 2000 | General | November 7 | David Ward (inc.) | Republican | 14,867 | 57.63% | Steven J. Nass | Dem. | 10,913 | 42.30% | 25,799 | 3,954 |
| 2002 | General | November 5 | David Ward (inc.) | Republican | 11,528 | 62.53% | Donald Scott Waller | Dem. | 6,896 | 37.40% | 18,437 | 4,632 |
| 2004 | General | November 2 | David Ward (inc.) | Republican | 17,403 | 59.80% | Gary R. Rattmann | Dem. | 11,677 | 40.13% | 29,101 | 5,726 |

Wisconsin State Assembly
| Preceded by Randall J. Radtke | Member of the Wisconsin State Assembly from the 37th district January 4, 1993 – August 2, 2006 | Succeeded by Andy Jorgensen |
