= Timothy Hoven =

American politician and businessman

Timothy Hoven (born December 22, 1963) is a Wisconsin politician and businessman.

Born in Milwaukee, Wisconsin, Hoven graduated from University of Wisconsin–Oshkosh with a degree in criminal justice. Beginning in 1995, Hoven served in the Wisconsin State Assembly. On August 1, 2002, Hoven resigned from the Wisconsin State Assembly to return to the private sector.
