= Eugene Hahn =

American politician (born 1929)

Member of the Wisconsin State Assembly from the 47th district
- In office 1991–2009
- Preceded by: Robert Thompson
- Succeeded by: Keith Ripp

Personal details
- Born: July 21, 1929 (age 97) Milwaukee, Wisconsin
- Party: Republican
- Profession: Politician, farmer

Eugene H. Hahn (born July 21, 1929) is a Wisconsin politician.

Hahn was born in Milwaukee but was raised in the Town of Springvale, Wisconsin. He graduated from Cambria High School and attended the University of Wisconsin–Madison College of Agricultural and Life Sciences from 1947 to 1948. He married Lorraine Eleanor Closs (1931–2021) in 1949. He worked as a farmer for most of his life.

Hahn first became involved in politics in 1957, when he was elected assessor for the Town of Springvale. He served as assessor until 1961. In 1972, Hahn was elected to the Board of Supervisors for Columbia County, where he served until 1991. He was elected to the Wisconsin State Assembly in 1990 and served there until his retirement in 2009.
