= Mike Powers (politician) =

American politician

Michael Powers (born March 31, 1962) is an American Republican politician.

Born in Madison, Wisconsin, Powers graduated from University of Wisconsin–Platteville in land reclamation. Powers served on the Green County, Wisconsin Board of Supervisors. Powers served in the Wisconsin State Assembly 1995-2005 from Albany, Wisconsin. In 2011, Powers worked in the Wisconsin Department of Agriculture, Trade and Consumer Protection. Powers worked as a Business Development Officer for the Wisconsin Housing and Economic Development Authority (WHEDA) specializing in small business loans and New Market Tax Credits as part of the Greater Wisconsin Opportunity Fund (GWOF). Powers was a featured speaker at the University of Wisconsin Nelson Institute for Environmental Studies. Powers worked for EcoEnergy, LLC, a division of the Morse Group, and assisted with the development of the EcoGrove Wind Farm in Stephenson County, IL for Acciona North America.
