= Rick Skindrud =

American politician

Richard A. "Rick" Skindrud (born September 15, 1944) is an American former truck driver, farmer, and Republican politician from Mt. Horeb, Wisconsin who served almost ten years as a member of the Wisconsin State Assembly. When he lost his office, he was then elected as Sergeant at Arms of that body.

== Background ==
Skindrud was born in Mt. Horeb on September 15, 1944; he is married, with 3 children. He served in the United States Army during the Vietnam War as a helicopter crew chief from 1965 to 1967. He worked as a truck driver and farmer, and in 1981 was appointed to the Town of Primrose land use Committee. He was elected to the Dane County board of supervisors in 1989, and served from 1989 to 1994.

== Legislative service ==
Skindrud was elected to the Assembly in a June 1993 special election, and was reelected in 1994–2000, even though Madison Magazine had in 1996 classified him as a "Lawmaker Who Just Takes Up Space" ("our 'State Capitol Furniture' category"), before losing in 2002 to Democrat Sondy Pope-Roberts (who had unsuccessfully challenged Skindrud in 2000). After he left office in 2003, he was elected as Sergeant at Arms of the Assembly by his fellow Republicans, who were in the majority at that time.
