= Martin Reynolds (politician) =

American politician from Wisconsin

Martin 'Marty' Reynolds (February 8, 1950 – March 23, 2026) was an American politician and plumbing contractor.

Born in Ladysmith, Wisconsin, Reynolds served in the United States Air Force and was a plumbing contractor. He served as mayor of Ladysmith from 1986 until 1992. In 1990, Reynolds, a Democrat, was elected to the Wisconsin State Assembly. Reynolds served in the Wisconsin State Assembly from 1991 until 2003, when he ran for Lieutenant Governor of Wisconsin with Ed Thompson on the Libertarian Party ticket in the 2002 Wisconsin Gubernatorial Election. Reynolds died on March 23, 2026.
