= DuWayne Johnsrud =

American politician and farmer

Member of the Wisconsin State Assembly from the 96th district
- In office January 7, 1985 – January 3, 2005
- Preceded by: David Clarenbach
- Succeeded by: Lee Nerison

Personal details
- Born: September 4, 1943 (age 82) Boscobel, Wisconsin, U.S.
- Party: Republican

DuWayne Johnsrud (born September 4, 1943) is an American Republican politician and farmer from Wisconsin.

== Background ==
Born in Boscobel, Wisconsin, Johnsrud was a farmer. He served in the Wisconsin State Assembly from 1985 to 2003. Johnsrud is also a competitive tobacco-spitter. In 1998, he placed fifth in a tobacco-spitting contest held in Westby, Wisconsin.
