= Lorraine Seratti =

American politician and businesswoman

Lorraine Seratti (born October 30, 1949) is an American Republican politician from Wisconsin.

Born in L'Anse, Michigan, Seratti was a businesswoman in Spread Eagle, Wisconsin. Seratti served in the Wisconsin State Assembly 1993 until 2005, when she announced her retirement from the Wisconsin State Assembly in 2004.
