= Marc C. Duff =

American politician

Member of the Wisconsin State Assembly
- In office January 4, 1993 – January 6, 2003
- Preceded by: Peggy Rosenzweig
- Succeeded by: Scott R. Jensen
- Constituency: 98th district
- In office January 2, 1989 – January 4, 1993
- Preceded by: John C. Schober
- Succeeded by: Mary Lazich
- Constituency: 84th district

Personal details
- Born: July 4, 1961 (age 65) Port Washington, Wisconsin
- Party: Republican
- Education: University of Wisconsin-Whitewater; Robert M. La Follette Institute of Public Affairs

Marc C. Duff (born July 4, 1961) is a former member of the Wisconsin State Assembly.

== Biography ==
Duff was born on July 4, 1961, in Port Washington, Wisconsin. He graduated from New Berlin Eisenhower Middle/High School in New Berlin, Wisconsin as well as the University of Wisconsin-Whitewater and the Robert M. La Follette Institute of Public Affairs at the University of Wisconsin-Madison. Duff is married with two children.

== Career ==
Duff was first elected to the Assembly in 1988. He was also a member of the Waukesha County, Wisconsin Board from 1988 to 1989. Duff was elected as a Republican.

Duff was the CFO of Racine Unified School District in Racine, Wisconsin and retired in April, 2021. Duff remains active in school business management.
