= Frank Urban =

American politician

Member of the Wisconsin State Assembly from the 99th district
- In office September 22, 1989 – January 6, 2003
- Preceded by: Margaret Farrow
- Succeeded by: Michael A. Lehman

Personal details
- Born: May 24, 1930 St. Louis, Missouri
- Died: October 25, 2008 (aged 78) Egypt
- Party: Republican
- Spouse: Lois Elaine Thurwachter Urban (1954-1991) Kathryn Bloomberg (1993-2008)
- Children: James, Barbara, Michael, Mark, David, Bruce and John (all with Lois)
- Education: University of Wisconsin–Madison

Frank Henry "Hank" Urban (May 24, 1930 – October 25, 2008) was a member of the Republican Party who served in the Wisconsin State Assembly from 1989 to 2001.

== Biography ==
He was a resident of Brookfield, Wisconsin and was married to Lois Elaine Thurwachter Urban, with whom he had seven children. The two were married for 37 years until her death in 1991 from complications of Alzheimer's disease. Soon after that, he married again. His second wife was Kate Bloomberg, a former Brookfield mayor and co-inventor of Shrinky Dinks, who he remained with until his death in 2008.

Urban was born in St. Louis, Missouri, graduated from the University of Wisconsin–Madison in 1951, and received his M.D. from the University of Wisconsin–Madison in 1954, specializing in dermatology. He served in the U.S. Army from 1954 to 1957, and was a veteran of the Korean War.

Urban served on the Elm Grove Village Board from 1985 to 1989, servings as its president from 1987 to 1989. He was elected to fill the 99th district seat left vacant by Margaret Farrow in a September 1989 special election.

In the Assembly, Urban was chairman of the Public Health committee. He was a boy scout leader and an accomplished model train collector.

Wisconsin State Assembly
Preceded by Margaret Farrow	Member of the Wisconsin State Assembly from the 99th district September 22, 1989 – January 6, 2003	Succeeded by Don Pridemore
