= Joan Wade =

American politician

Joan Wade (born March 16, 1962) is a former member of the Wisconsin State Assembly and the current Executive Director of the Association of Educational Service Agencies (AESA).

== Biography ==
Wade was born on March 16, 1962, in Portage, Wisconsin. She graduated from Portage High School as well as the University of Wisconsin-Whitewater, the University of Wisconsin-Madison, and Edgewood College.

Wade began her career as a library media specialist in Montello, Wisconsin. She later served in various administrative capacities in Wisconsin school districts including as Technology Coordinator for Portage Community School District, and Distance Learning Director for CESA 5.

Wade was first elected to the Assembly in January 1998 in a special election and remained a member until 2001. She served on the Education, Agriculture and Ways and Means Committees as well as chair of the state’s Tourism committee. Wade also served as a member of the UW-Oshkosh Chancellor's advisory Council, Badgernet Converged Network Advisory Board, Wisconsin Association of CESA Administrators, State Superintendents Educational Data Advisory Committee, and CESA Foundation Board. She is a Republican.

=== Controversy ===
In 2011, One Wisconsin Now filed an ethics complaint against Wade's husband, Wisconsin State Senator Luther Olsen with the Government Accountability Board. The complaint alleged that Olsen inserted language into a bill in order to financially help Wade in her position as CESA administrator. Wade responded to the complaint by calling it 'ridiculous.'

== Personal life ==
Wade has been married to Luther Olsen since 2006. Her first husband, John Spillner, Sr., was a candidate for the Wisconsin State Senate in 2004. She has two children.
