= Waukechon, Wisconsin =

- Town
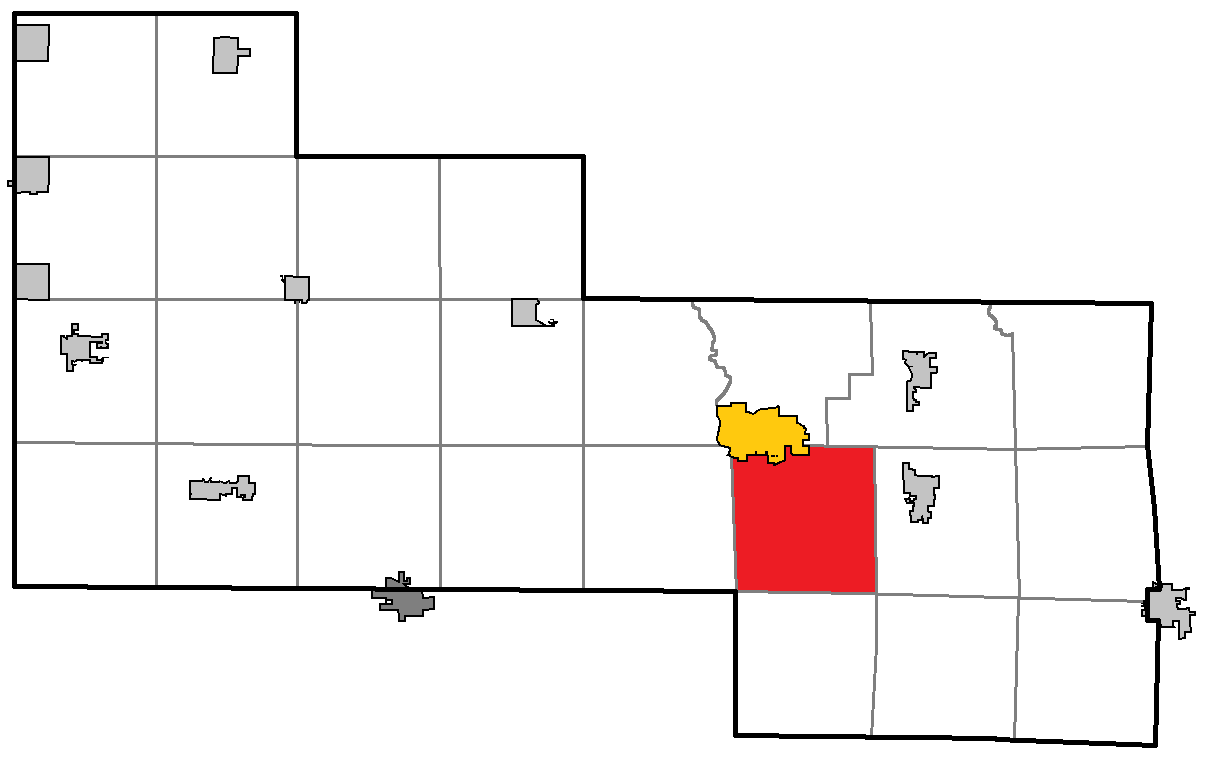
- Location of Waukechon, within Shawano County
- Coordinates: 44°44′2″N 88°32′45″W
- Country: United States
- State: Wisconsin
- County: Shawano

Area
  - Total: 35.9 sq mi (93.0 km^{2})
  - Land: 35.4 sq mi (91.7 km^{2})
  - Water: 0.50 sq mi (1.3 km^{2})
- Elevation: 823 ft (251 m)

Population (2020)
  - Total: 1,002
  - Density: 28.3/sq mi (10.9/km^{2})
- Time zone: UTC-6 (Central (CST))
  - Summer (DST): UTC-5 (CDT)
- FIPS code: 55-84225
- GNIS feature ID: 1584370

Waukechon is a town in Shawano County, Wisconsin, United States. The population was 1,002 at the 2020 census. The unincorporated community of Lunds is located in the town. Its Menominee name is Wākecānāpāēw, meaning "crooked beak man", a reference to the Thunderbird Clan of the Ho-Chunk.

== Geography ==
According to the United States Census Bureau, the town has a total area of 35.9 square miles (93.0 km^{2}), of which 35.4 square miles (91.7 km^{2}) is land and 0.5 square mile (1.3 km^{2}) (1.39%) is water.

== Demographics ==
As of the census of 2000, there were 928 people, 337 households, and 262 families residing in the town. The population density was 26.2 people per square mile (10.1/km^{2}). There were 362 housing units at an average density of 10.2 per square mile (3.9/km^{2}). The racial makeup of the town was 97.31% White, 1.19% Native American, 0.11% Asian, 0.65% from other races, and 0.75% from two or more races. Hispanic or Latino of any race were 0.75% of the population.

There were 337 households, out of which 38.0% had children under the age of 18 living with them, 68.5% were married couples living together, 3.9% had a female householder with no husband present, and 22.0% were non-families. 17.2% of all households were made up of individuals, and 6.8% had someone living alone who was 65 years of age or older. The average household size was 2.75 and the average family size was 3.12.

In the town, the population was spread out, with 28.4% under the age of 18, 5.9% from 18 to 24, 30.0% from 25 to 44, 22.7% from 45 to 64, and 12.9% who were 65 years of age or older. The median age was 38 years. For every 100 females, there were 110.0 males. For every 100 females age 18 and over, there were 110.8 males.

The median income for a household in the town was $46,000, and the median income for a family was $54,375. Males had a median income of $33,462 versus $20,156 for females. The per capita income for the town was $18,041. About 2.4% of families and 3.8% of the population were below the poverty line, including 3.2% of those under age 18 and 8.6% of those age 65 or over.
