= Westfield, Sauk County, Wisconsin =

Town of Westfield, Wisconsin
- Town
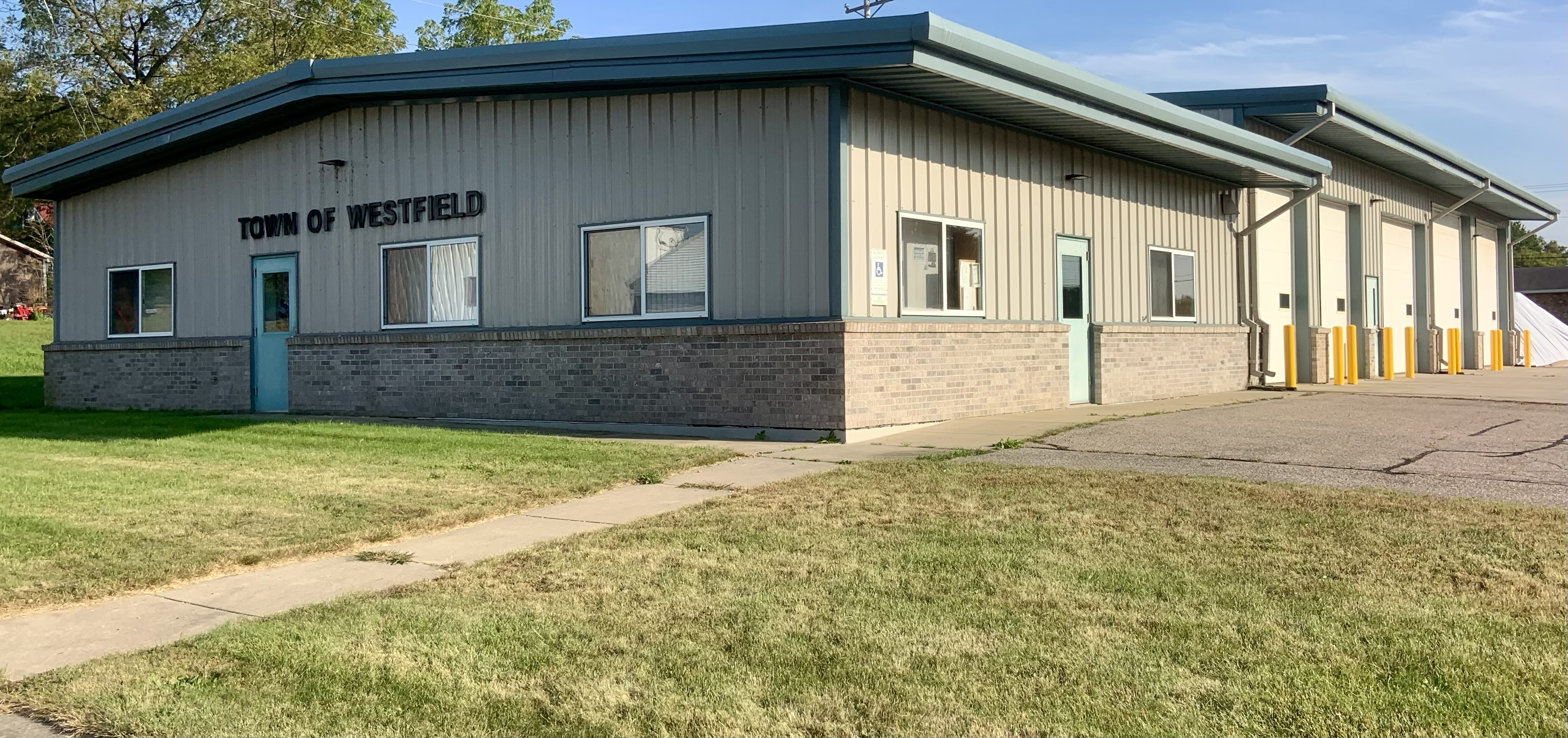
- Town hall in Loganville

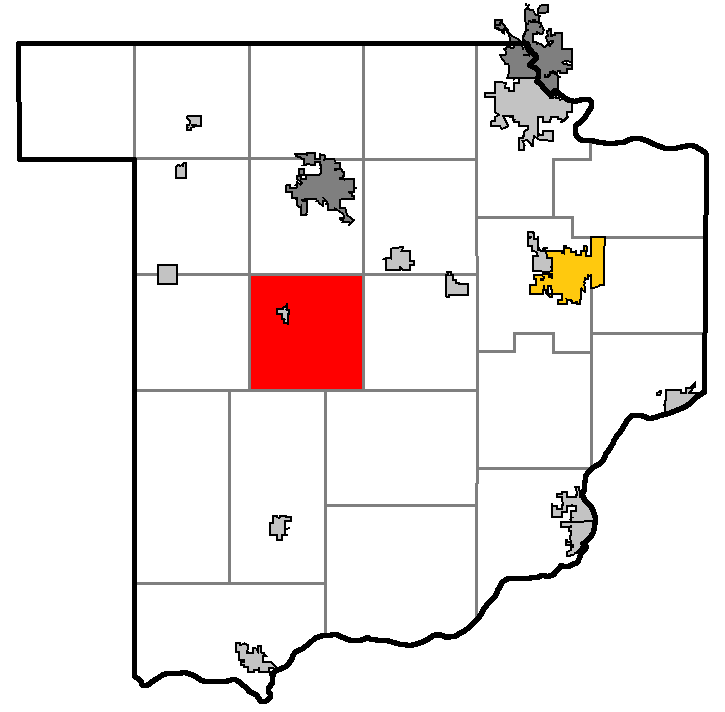
- Location of the Town of Westfield, Sauk County, Wisconsin

- Location of Sauk County, Wisconsin
- Coordinates: 43°25′24″N 89°59′56″W
- Country: United States
- State: Wisconsin
- County: Sauk

Area
  - Total: 35.8 sq mi (92.6 km^{2})
  - Land: 35.8 sq mi (92.6 km^{2})
  - Water: 0 sq mi (0.0 km^{2})
- Elevation: 1,096 ft (334 m)

Population (2020)
  - Total: 582
  - Density: 16.3/sq mi (6.29/km^{2})
- Time zone: UTC-6 (Central (CST))
  - Summer (DST): UTC-5 (CDT)
- Area code: 608
- FIPS code: 55-85625
- GNIS feature ID: 1584405

The Town of Westfield is located in Sauk County, Wisconsin, United States. The population was 582 at the 2020 census.

== Geography ==
According to the United States Census Bureau, the town has a total area of 35.8 square miles (92.6 km^{2}), of which 35.8 square miles (92.6 km^{2}) is land and 0.03% is water.

== Demographics ==
As of the census of 2000, there were 611 people, 202 households, and 171 families residing in the town. The population density was 17.1 people per square mile (6.6/km^{2}). There were 216 housing units at an average density of 6.0 per square mile (2.3/km^{2}). The racial makeup of the town was 99.18% White, 0.65% from other races, and 0.16% from two or more races. Hispanic or Latino of any race were 2.95% of the population.

There were 202 households, out of which 39.1% had children under the age of 18 living with them, 79.7% were married couples living together, 2.5% had a female householder with no husband present, and 15.3% were non-families. 11.4% of all households were made up of individuals, and 4.5% had someone living alone who was 65 years of age or older. The average household size was 3.02 and the average family size was 3.32.

The population was 30.8% under the age of 18, 6.9% from 18 to 24, 25.9% from 25 to 44, 25.0% from 45 to 64, and 11.5% who were 65 years of age or older. The median age was 37 years. For every 100 females, there were 115.9 males. For every 100 females age 18 and over, there were 108.4 males.

The median income for a household in the town was $42,188, and the median income for a family was $42,679. Males had a median income of $22,422 versus $20,694 for females. The per capita income for the town was $16,231. About 9.1% of families and 13.2% of the population were below the poverty line, including 23.6% of those under age 18 and 9.5% of those age 65 or over.
