= 2008 Wisconsin State Assembly election =

- November 4, 2008

All 99 seats in the Wisconsin State Assembly 50 seats needed for a majority
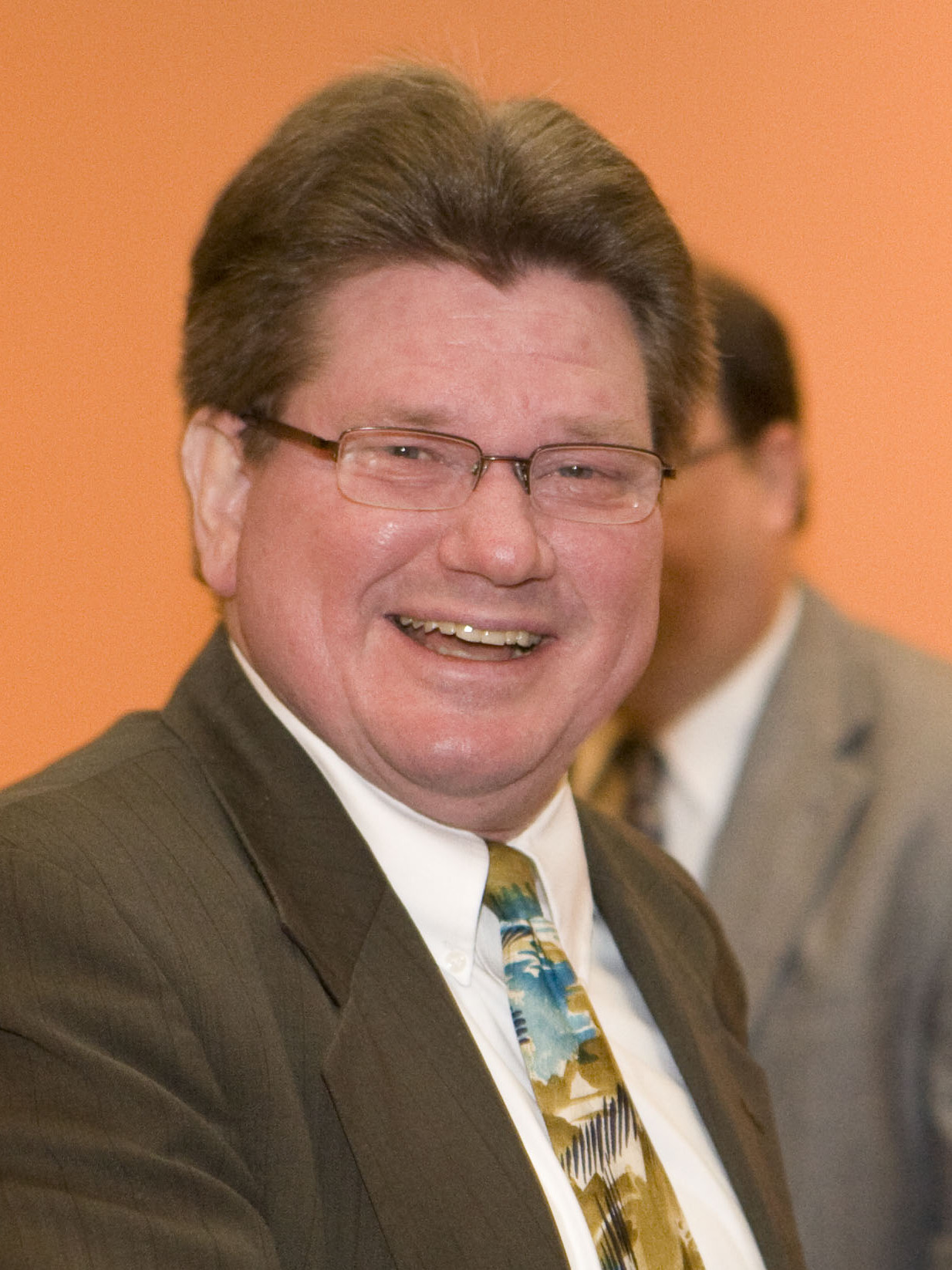

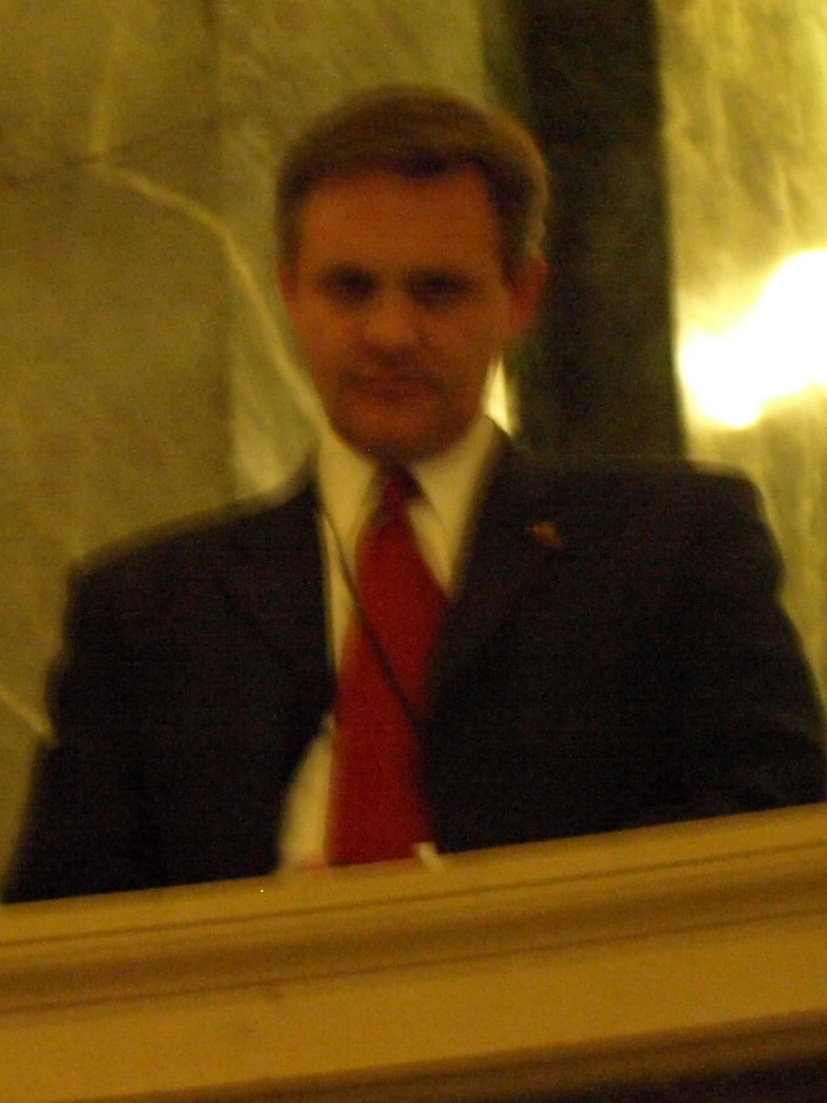
	Majority party	Minority party
Leader	James Kreuser (retired)	Michael Huebsch
Party	Democratic	Republican
Leader since	November 13, 2002	January 1, 2007
Leader's seat	64th–Kenosha	94th–West Salem
Last election	47 seats, TBD%	52 seats, TBD%
Seats before	47	51
Seats won	52	46
Seat change	▲5	▼5
Popular vote	1,478,815	1,161,265
Percentage	55.31%	43.43%
	Third party
Party	Independent
Last election	N/A
Seats before	1
Seats won	1
Seat change	Steady
Popular vote	26,037
Percentage	0.97%
- Democratic hold Democratic gain Republican hold Independent hold 50–60% 60–70% 80–90% >90% 40–50% 50–60% 60–70% 70–80% >90% 50–60%
Speaker before election
Michael Huebsch
Republican
Elected Speaker
Michael J. Sheridan
Democratic

The 2008 Wisconsin State Assembly election was held on Tuesday, November 4, 2008. All 99 seats in the Wisconsin State Assembly were up for election. Before the election, 51 Assembly seats were held by Republicans and 47 seats were held by Democrats. The primary election was held on September 9, 2008.

Democrats flipped five Republican-held seats and took the Assembly majority for the first time since 1994. They entered the 98th Wisconsin Legislature with 52 of 99 Assembly seats.

== Results summary ==
Seats		Party (majority caucus shading)			Total
Seats		Democratic	Independent	Republican	Total
Last election (2006)		47	0	52	99
Total after last election (2006)		47	0	52	99
Total before this election		47	1	51	99
Up for election		47	1	51	99
of which:	Incumbent retired	5	0	6	11
of which:	Vacated	0	0	0	0
of which:	Unopposed	20	0	4	24
This election		52	1	46	99
Change from last election		▲5	▲1	▼6	Steady
Total after this election		52	1	46	99
Change in total		▼3	Steady	▲3	Steady

Popular vote
Democratic	55.31%
Republican	43.43%
Independent	0.97%
Libertarian	0.29%

Assembly seats
Democratic	52.53%
Republican	46.46%
Independent	1.01%

=== Close races ===
Seats where the margin of victory was under 10%:

1. State Assembly district 47, 0.07%
2. State Assembly district 34, 0.64%
3. State Assembly district 67, 0.73%
4. State Assembly district 68, 0.88% (gain)
5. State Assembly district 87, 0.90%
6. State Assembly district 43, 2.42%
7. State Assembly district 1, 2.74%
8. State Assembly district 96, 3.46%
9. State Assembly district 36, 3.59%
10. State Assembly district 2, 4.30% (gain)
11. State Assembly district 21, 5.00%
12. State Assembly district 4, 5.53%
13. State Assembly district 92, 6.51% (gain)
14. State Assembly district 89, 7.14%
15. State Assembly district 90, 7.47%
16. State Assembly district 55, 7.86%
17. State Assembly district 49, 8.06%
18. State Assembly district 94, 8.13%
19. State Assembly district 97, 9.35%
20. State Assembly district 30, 9.57%

== Outgoing incumbents ==
=== Retiring ===
- Sheryl Albers (R–Reedsburg), representing district 50 since 1991, retired.
- Frank Boyle (D–Superior), representing district 73 since 1987, retired.
- Barbara Gronemus (D–Whitehall), representing district 91 since 1985, (Note: First elected to the 43rd district in 1982) retired.
- Eugene Hahn (R–Cambria), representing district 47 since 1991, retired.
- Suzanne Jeskewitz (R–Menomonee Falls), representing district 24 since 1997, retired.
- Terry Musser (R–Black River Falls), representing district 92 since 1984, retired.
- Carol Owens (R–Oshkosh), representing district 53 since 1993, retired.
- David Travis (D–Waunakee), representing district 81 since 1985, (Note: Previously represented the 37th district from 1979–1983 and the 93rd district from 1983–1985) retired.
- Steve Wieckert (R–Appleton), representing district 57 since 1996, retired.

=== Seeking other office ===
- James Kreuser (D–Kenosha), representing district 64 since 1993, retired to serve as County Executive of Kenosha County.
- Sheldon Wasserman (D–Milwaukee), representing District 22 since 1995, unsuccessfully ran for State Senate.

== Predictions ==
Source	Ranking	As of
Stateline	Tossup	October 15, 2008

== Race summary ==
District	Incumbent				This race	
District	Member	Party	First elected	Status	Candidates	Results
1	Garey Bies	Republican	2000	Ran	▌ ✓ Garey Bies (Rep.) 51.33%; ▌Dick Skare (Dem.) 48.59%	Incumbent re-elected
2	Frank Lasee	Republican	1994	Ran	▌ ✓ Ted Zigmunt (Dem.) 52.12%; ▌Frank Lasee (Rep.) 47.82%	Incumbent defeated. New member elected Democratic gain.
3	Al Ott	Republican	1986	Ran	▌ ✓ Al Ott (Rep.) 58.26%; ▌Justin Krueger (Dem.) 41.67%	Incumbent re-elected
4	Phil Montgomery	Republican	1998	Ran	▌ ✓ Phil Montgomery (Rep.) 52.73%; ▌Sam Dunlop (Dem.) 47.20%	Incumbent re-elected
5	Tom Nelson	Democratic	2004	Ran	▌ ✓ Tom Nelson (Dem.) 64.44%; ▌Jim Steineke (Rep.) 35.52%	Incumbent re-elected
6	Gary Tauchen	Republican	2006	Ran	▌ ✓ Gary Tauchen (Rep.) 55.02%; ▌John Powers (Dem.) 44.95%	Incumbent re-elected
7	Peggy Krusick	Democratic	1983 (special)	Ran	▌ ✓ Peggy Krusick (Dem.) 59.53%; ▌Corrine Wiesmueller (Rep.) 38.01%; ▌Brad Sponholz (Lib.) 2.35%	Incumbent re-elected
8	Pedro Colón	Democratic	1998	Ran	▌Pedro Colón (Dem.) 98.26%	Incumbent re-elected
9	Josh Zepnick	Democratic	2002	Ran	▌Josh Zepnick (Dem.) 98.53%	Incumbent re-elected
10	Annette Polly Williams	Democratic	1980 (Note: Elected to the 17th district in 1980 and 1984, the 11th in 1982, and the 10th in 1992)	Ran	▌Annette Polly Williams (Dem.) 99.19%	Incumbent re-elected
11	Jason Fields	Democratic	2004	Ran	▌Jason Fields (Dem.) 99.24%	Incumbent re-elected
12	Fred Kessler	Democratic	1960; 1962 (retired); 1964; 1972 (retired); 2004	Ran	▌Fred Kessler (Dem.) 98.92%	Incumbent re-elected
13	David Cullen	Democratic	1990 (special)	Ran	▌David Cullen (Dem.) 98.42%	Incumbent re-elected
14	Leah Vukmir	Republican	2002 (special)	Ran	▌ ✓ Leah Vukmir (Rep.) 62.28%; ▌Dave Hucke (Dem.) 37.55%	Incumbent re-elected
15	Tony Staskunas	Democratic	1996	Ran	▌ ✓ Tony Staskunas (Dem.) 60.45%; ▌David Nickel (Rep.) 39.40%	Incumbent re-elected
16	Leon Young	Democratic	1992	Ran	▌Leon Young (Dem.) 98.81%	Incumbent re-elected
17	Barbara Toles	Democratic	2004 (special)	Ran	▌Barbara Toles (Dem.) 99.20%	Incumbent re-elected
18	Tamara Grigsby	Democratic	2004	Ran	▌Tamara Grigsby (Dem.) 98.96%	Incumbent re-elected
19	Jon Richards	Democratic	1998	Ran	▌Jon Richards (Dem.) 98.52%	Incumbent re-elected
20	Christine Sinicki	Democratic	1998	Ran	▌Christine Sinicki (Dem.) 98.22%	Incumbent re-elected
21	Mark Honadel	Republican	2003 (special)	Ran	▌ ✓ Mark Honadel (Rep.) 52.43%; ▌Glen Brower (Dem.) 47.43%	Incumbent re-elected
22	Sheldon Wasserman	Democratic	1994	Ran for State Senate	▌ ✓ Sandy Pasch (Dem.) 67.06%; ▌Yash P. Wadhwa (Rep.) 32.77%	Incumbent retired. New member elected Democratic hold.
23	Jim Ott	Republican	2006	Ran	▌ ✓ Jim Ott (Rep.) 57.83%; ▌Rene Settle-Robinson (Dem.) 42.10%	Incumbent re-elected
24	Suzanne Jeskewitz	Republican	1996	Incumbent retired	▌ ✓ Dan Knodl (Rep.) 61.88%; ▌Charlene S. Brady (Dem.) 37.90%	Incumbent retired. New member elected Republican hold.
25	Bob Ziegelbauer	Democratic	1992	Ran	▌Bob Ziegelbauer (Dem.) 98.85%	Incumbent re-elected
26	Terry Van Akkeren	Democratic	2002	Ran	▌ ✓ Terry Van Akkeren (Dem.) 65.43%; ▌Alex Pieper (Rep.) 34.51%	Incumbent re-elected
27	Steve Kestell	Republican	1998	Ran	▌ ✓ Steve Kestell (Rep.) 65.95%; ▌Bob Cox (Dem.) 33.99%	Incumbent re-elected
28	Ann Hraychuck	Democratic	2006	Ran	▌ ✓ Ann Hraychuck (Dem.) 55.37%; ▌Kent Muschinske (Rep.) 44.59%	Incumbent re-elected
29	John Murtha	Republican	2006	Ran	▌ ✓ John Murtha (Rep.) 53.38%; ▌Chris Buckel (Dem.) 42.73%; ▌Craig Mohn (Lib.) 3.80%	Incumbent re-elected
30	Kitty Rhoades	Republican	1998	Ran	▌ ✓ Kitty Rhoades (Rep.) 54.74%; ▌Sarah A. Bruch (Dem.) 45.17%	Incumbent re-elected
31	Stephen Nass	Republican	1990	Ran	▌ ✓ Stephen Nass (Rep.) 66.66%; ▌Frank E. Urban (Dem.) 33.22%	Incumbent re-elected
32	Thomas Lothian	Republican	2002	Ran	▌ ✓ Thomas Lothian (Rep.) 51.65%; ▌Doug A. Harrod (Dem.) 41.23%; ▌John K. Finley (Ind.) 7.40%	Incumbent re-elected
33	Scott Newcomer	Republican	2005 (special)	Ran	▌Scott Newcomer (Rep.) 99.77%	Incumbent re-elected
34	Dan Meyer	Republican	1998	Ran	▌ ✓ Dan Meyer (Rep.) 50.28%; ▌Paul Tubbs (Dem.) 49.64%	Incumbent re-elected
35	Donald Friske	Republican	2000	Ran	▌ ✓ Donald Friske (Rep.) 56.72%; ▌Jay Schmelling (Dem.) 43.23%	Incumbent re-elected
36	Jeffrey Mursau	Republican	2004	Ran	▌ ✓ Jeffrey Mursau (Rep.) 51.78%; ▌Stan Gruszynski (Dem.) 48.19%	Incumbent re-elected
37	Andy Jorgensen	Democratic	2006	Ran	▌ ✓ Andy Jorgensen (Dem.) 59.23%; ▌Kent Koebke (Rep.) 40.64%	Incumbent re-elected
38	Joel Kleefisch	Republican	2004	Ran	▌ ✓ Joel Kleefisch (Rep.) 66.27%; ▌Dick Pas (Dem.) 33.62%	Incumbent re-elected
39	Jeff Fitzgerald	Republican	2000	Ran	▌ ✓ Jeff Fitzgerald (Rep.) 60.08%; ▌Aaron E. Onsrud (Dem.) 39.89%	Incumbent re-elected
40	Kevin David Petersen	Republican	2006	Ran	▌ ✓ Kevin David Petersen (Rep.) 58.29%; ▌Kevin M. Kuehl (Dem.) 41.67%	Incumbent re-elected
41	Joan Ballweg	Republican	2004	Ran	▌ ✓ Joan Ballweg (Rep.) 62.78%; ▌Scott Milheiser (Dem.) 37.14%	Incumbent re-elected
42	Jacob Hines	Republican	2001 (special)	Ran	▌ ✓ Fred Clark (Dem.) 58.47%; ▌Jacob Hines (Rep.) 41.47%	Incumbent defeated. New member elected Democratic gain.
43	Kim Hixson	Democratic	2006	Ran	▌ ✓ Kim Hixson (Dem.) 51.16%; ▌Debi Towns (Rep.) 48.74%	Incumbent re-elected
44	Michael J. Sheridan	Democratic	2004	Ran	▌Michael J. Sheridan (Dem.) 99.15%	Incumbent re-elected
45	Chuck Benedict	Democratic	2004	Ran	▌ ✓ Chuck Benedict (Dem.) 60.37%; ▌Mike Hahn (Rep.) 39.58%	Incumbent re-elected
46	Gary Hebl	Democratic	2004	Ran	▌ ✓ Gary Hebl (Dem.) 66.28%; ▌Kathy Maves (Rep.) 33.70%	Incumbent re-elected
47	Eugene Hahn	Republican	1990	Incumbent retired	▌ ✓ Keith Ripp (Rep.) 47.87%; ▌Trish O'Neil (Dem.) 47.80%; ▌Dennis E. Hruby (Ind.) 4.30%	Incumbent retired. New member elected Republican hold.
48	Joe Parisi	Democratic	2004	Ran	▌Joe Parisi (Dem.) 99.51%	Incumbent re-elected
49	Phil Garthwaite	Democratic	2006	Ran	▌ ✓ Phil Garthwaite (Dem.) 53.96%; ▌Travis Tranel (Rep.) 45.90%	Incumbent re-elected
50	Sheryl Albers	Republican	1991 (special)	Incumbent retired	▌ ✓ Ed Brooks (Rep.) 56.20%; ▌Tom Crofton (Dem.) 43.73%	Incumbent retired. New member elected Republican hold.
51	Steve Hilgenberg	Democratic	2006	Ran	▌ ✓ Steve Hilgenberg (Dem.) 56.84%; ▌Nathan R. Russell (Rep.) 43.12%	Incumbent re-elected
52	John Townsend	Republican	1998	Ran	▌ ✓ John Townsend (Rep.) 57.92%; ▌Jerry Keifenheim (Dem.) 42.02%	Incumbent re-elected
53	Carol Owens	Republican	1992	Incumbent retired	▌ ✓ Richard Spanbauer (Rep.) 63.80%; ▌Jeff Mann (Dem.) 36.11%	Incumbent retired. New member elected Republican hold.
54	Gordon Hintz	Democratic	2006	Ran	▌ ✓ Gordon Hintz (Dem.) 66.21%; ▌Mark Reiff (Rep.) 33.64%	Incumbent re-elected
55	Dean Kaufert	Republican	1991	Ran	▌ ✓ Dean Kaufert (Rep.) 53.88%; ▌Mark Westphal (Dem.) 46.02%	Incumbent re-elected
56	Roger Roth	Republican	2006	Ran	▌ ✓ Roger Roth (Rep.) 59.66%; ▌Susan Garcia Franz (Dem.) 40.24%	Incumbent re-elected
57	Steve Wieckert	Republican	1996	Incumbent retired	▌ ✓ Penny Bernard Schaber (Dem.) 56.98%; ▌Jo Egelhoff (Rep.) 42.82%	Incumbent retired. New member elected Democratic gain.
58	Patricia Strachota	Republican	2004	Ran	▌ ✓ Patricia Strachota (Rep.) 82.77%; ▌Greg Dombro (Ind.) 17.15%	Incumbent re-elected
59	Daniel LeMahieu	Republican	2002	Ran	▌Daniel LeMahieu (Rep.) 99.32%	Incumbent re-elected
60	Mark Gottlieb	Republican	2002	Ran	▌ ✓ Mark Gottlieb (Rep.) 70.29%; ▌Perry Duman (Dem.) 29.65%	Incumbent re-elected
61	Robert L. Turner	Democratic	1990	Ran	▌ ✓ Robert L. Turner (Dem.) 87.71%; ▌George Meyers (Lib.) 12.09%	Incumbent re-elected
62	Cory Mason	Democratic	2006	Ran	▌ ✓ Cory Mason (Dem.) 84.54%; ▌Keith Deschler (Lib.) 15.20%	Incumbent re-elected
63	Robin Vos	Republican	2004	Ran	▌ ✓ Robin Vos (Rep.) 61.51%; ▌Linda Flashinski (Dem.) 38.45%	Incumbent re-elected
64	James Kreuser	Democratic	1993 (special)	Retired to serve as Kenosha County Executive	▌Peter Barca (Dem.) 98.71%	Incumbent retired. New member elected Democratic hold.
65	John Steinbrink	Democratic	1996	Ran	▌ ✓ John Steinbrink (Dem.) 62.12%; ▌Alex Tiahnybok (Rep.) 37.75%	Incumbent re-elected
66	Samantha Kerkman	Republican	2000	Ran	▌ ✓ Samantha Kerkman (Rep.) 59.91%; ▌Larry Zamba (Dem.) 40.03%	Incumbent re-elected
67	Jeffrey Wood	Independent	2002 (Note: First elected as a Republican)	Ran	▌ ✓ Jeffrey Wood (Ind.) 50.28%; ▌Don Moga (Rep.) 49.55%	Incumbent re-elected
68	Terry Moulton	Republican	2004	Ran	▌ ✓ Kristen Dexter (Dem.) 50.35%; ▌Terry Moulton (Rep.) 49.47%	Incumbent defeated. New member elected Democratic gain.
69	Scott Suder	Republican	1998	Ran	▌ ✓ Scott Suder (Rep.) 59.46%; ▌Tim Swiggum (Dem.) 40.51%	Incumbent re-elected
70	Amy Sue Vruwink	Democratic	2002	Ran	▌ ✓ Amy Sue Vruwink (Dem.) 69.62%; ▌Dennis Seevers (Rep.) 30.34%	Incumbent re-elected
71	Louis Molepske	Democratic	2003 (special)	Ran	▌ ✓ Louis Molepske (Dem.) 68.61%; ▌Daron L. Jensen (Rep.) 31.24%	Incumbent re-elected
72	Marlin Schneider	Democratic	1970 (Note: Elected to Wood County's 2nd district in 1970, the 59th district in 1972, the 59th district in 1982, and the 72nd in 1984)	Ran	▌ ✓ Marlin Schneider (Dem.) 62.23%; ▌Jeff Tyberg (Rep.) 37.69%	Incumbent re-elected
73	Frank Boyle	Democratic	1986	Incumbent retired	▌ ✓ Nick Milroy (Dem.) 80.76%; ▌Jeffrey Monaghan (Ind.) 18.69%	Incumbent retired. New member elected Democratic hold.
74	Gary Sherman	Democratic	1998	Ran	▌ ✓ Gary Sherman (Dem.) 62.38%; ▌Shirl LaBarre (Rep.) 37.58%	Incumbent re-elected
75	Mary Hubler	Democratic	1984	Ran	▌Mary Hubler (Dem.) 99.03%	Incumbent re-elected
76	Terese Berceau	Democratic	1998	Ran	▌Terese Berceau (Dem.) 99.39%	Incumbent re-elected
77	Spencer Black	Democratic	1984	Ran	▌Spencer Black (Dem.) 99.40%	Incumbent re-elected
78	Mark Pocan	Democratic	1998	Ran	▌Mark Pocan (Dem.) 99.38%	Incumbent re-elected
79	Sondy Pope	Democratic	2002	Ran	▌ ✓ Sondy Pope (Dem.) 66.71%; ▌Carl Skalitzky (Rep.) 33.22%	Incumbent re-elected
80	Brett Davis	Republican	2004	Ran	▌ ✓ Brett Davis (Rep.) 56.10%; ▌John Waelti (Dem.) 43.86%	Incumbent re-elected
81	David Travis	Democratic	1978	Incumbent retired	▌Kelda Roys (Dem.) 98.89%	Incumbent retired. New member elected Democratic hold.
82	Jeff Stone	Republican	1998 (special)	Ran	▌Jeff Stone (Rep.) 99.02%	Incumbent re-elected
83	Scott Gunderson	Republican	1994	Ran	▌ ✓ Scott Gunderson (Rep.) 72.97%; ▌Aaron Robertson (Dem.) 26.98%	Incumbent re-elected
84	Mark Gundrum	Republican	1998	Ran	▌Mark Gundrum (Rep.) 99.46%	Incumbent re-elected
85	Donna Seidel	Democratic	2004	Ran	▌ ✓ Donna Seidel (Dem.) 64.08%; ▌Jess F. Kufahl (Rep.) 35.81%	Incumbent re-elected
86	Jerry Petrowski	Republican	1998	Ran	▌ ✓ Jerry Petrowski (Rep.) 55.90%; ▌Nate Myszka (Dem.) 44.06%	Incumbent re-elected
87	Mary Williams	Republican	2002	Ran	▌ ✓ Mary Williams (Rep.) 50.42%; ▌Judy Reas (Dem.) 49.52%	Incumbent re-elected
88	James Soletski	Democratic	2006	Ran	▌ ✓ James Soletski (Dem.) 55.86%; ▌Tony Theisen (Rep.) 44.03%	Incumbent re-elected
89	John Nygren	Republican	2006	Ran	▌ ✓ John Nygren (Rep.) 53.54%; ▌Randy Koehn (Dem.) 46.40%	Incumbent re-elected
90	Karl Van Roy	Republican	2002	Ran	▌ ✓ Karl Van Roy (Rep.) 53.70%; ▌Lou Ann Weix (Dem.) 46.23%	Incumbent re-elected
91	Barbara Gronemus	Democratic	1982	Incumbent retired	▌ ✓ Chris Danou (Dem.) 53.70%; ▌Dave Hegenbarth (Rep.) 42.97%; ▌Paul A. Beseler (Ind.) 2.64%; ▌Ted Burleson (Lib.) 0.95%	Incumbent retired. New member elected Democratic hold.
92	Terry Musser	Republican	1984	Incumbent retired	▌ ✓ Mark Radcliffe (Dem.) 53.17%; ▌Dan Hellman (Rep.) 46.66%	Incumbent retired. New member elected Democratic gain.
93	Jeff Smith	Democratic	2006	Ran	▌ ✓ Jeff Smith (Dem.) 59.35%; ▌Darcy Fields (Rep.) 40.52%	Incumbent re-elected
94	Michael Huebsch	Republican	1994	Ran	▌ ✓ Michael Huebsch (Rep.) 54.04%; ▌Cheryl Hancock (Dem.) 45.91%	Incumbent re-elected
95	Jennifer Shilling	Democratic	2000	Ran	▌Jennifer Shilling (Dem.) 97.29%	Incumbent re-elected
96	Lee Nerison	Republican	2004	Ran	▌ ✓ Lee Nerison (Rep.) 51.72%; ▌Dale Klemme (Dem.) 48.26%	Incumbent re-elected
97	Bill Kramer	Republican	2006	Ran	▌ ✓ Bill Kramer (Rep.) 54.62%; ▌Ruth Page Jones (Dem.) 45.27%	Incumbent re-elected
98	Rich Zipperer	Republican	2006	Ran	▌ ✓ Rich Zipperer (Rep.) 71.88%; ▌Victor Weers (Dem.) 28.07%	Incumbent re-elected
99	Don Pridemore	Republican	2004	Ran	▌Don Pridemore (Rep.) 99.40%	Incumbent re-elected

== See also ==
- 2008 Wisconsin elections
  - 2008 United States Presidential election in Wisconsin
  - 2008 United States House of Representatives elections in Wisconsin
  - 2008 Wisconsin Senate election
- 2008 United States elections
- Wisconsin State Assembly
- Elections in Wisconsin
- Redistricting in Wisconsin
