= 99th Wisconsin Legislature =

Wisconsin legislative term for 2009–2010

←	98th	100th	→
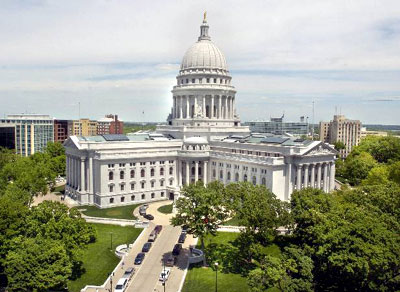
- Wisconsin State Capitol

Overview
- Legislative body: Wisconsin Legislature
- Meeting place: Wisconsin State Capitol
- Term: January 5, 2009 – January 3, 2011
- Election: November 4, 2008

Senate
- Members: 33
- Senate President: Fred A. Risser (D)
- President pro tempore: Pat Kreitlow (D)
- Party control: Democratic

Assembly
- Members: 99
- Assembly Speaker: Michael J. Sheridan (D)
- Speaker pro tempore: Tony Staskunas (D)
- Party control: Democratic

Sessions
- Regular: January 5, 2009 – January 3, 2011

Special sessions
- May 2009 Extra.: May 12, 2009 – May 13, 2009
- Jun. 2009 Extra.: June 9, 2009 – June 11, 2009
- Jun. 2009 Spec.: June 24, 2009 – June 27, 2009
- Dec. 2009 Extra.: December 16, 2009 – December 16, 2009
- Dec. 2009 Spec.: December 16, 2009 – March 4, 2010
- Dec. 2010 Extra.: December 15, 2010 – December 16, 2010

The Ninety-Ninth Wisconsin Legislature convened from January 5, 2009, through January 3, 2011, in regular session, though it adjourned for legislative activity on May 26, 2010. The legislature also held two special sessions and four extraordinary sessions during this legislative term.

This session represented the first time the Democratic Party of Wisconsin held full control of state government since 1986.

Senators representing even-numbered districts were newly elected for this session and were serving the first two years of a four-year term. Assembly members were elected to a two-year term. Assembly members and even-numbered senators were elected in the general election of November 4, 2008. Senators representing odd-numbered districts were serving the third and fourth year of their four-year term, having been elected in the general election held on November 7, 2006.

The governor of Wisconsin during this entire term was Democrat Jim Doyle, of Dane County, serving the second two years of his second four-year term, having won re-election in the 2006 Wisconsin gubernatorial election.

== Major events ==
- January 20, 2009: Barack Obama was inaugurated as the 44th President of the United States.
- February 17, 2009: The American Recovery and Reinvestment Act of 2009 was signed into law by President Obama.
- March 6, 2009: The Dow Jones Industrial Average hit 6,443.27, its lowest level of the 2008 financial crisis. It was 54% from its peak at 14,164 on October 9, 2007.
- May 12, 2009: The Wisconsin Senate called an extraordinary session to deal with Assembly Bill 255 – relating to eligibility for unemployment benefits and other matters relating to disbursement of funds from the federal American Recovery and Reinvestment Act of 2009.
- June 9, 2009: The Wisconsin Senate called an extraordinary session to deal with Senate Bill 232 – relating to payment of funds to state public schools.
- June 24, 2009: Wisconsin governor Jim Doyle called a Special session of the Legislature to act upon legislation relating to the hospital assessment, medical assistance and collecting federal revenue related to the assessment.
- November 2, 2010:
  - Scott Walker (R) elected Governor of Wisconsin.
  - Ron Johnson (R) elected United States senator from Wisconsin.
- December 16, 2009:
  - The Wisconsin Senate called an extraordinary session to deal with Senate Bill 66 – relating to laws on driving under the influence of alcohol.
  - Governor Doyle called a special session of the Legislature to act on Senate Bill 405 and Assembly Bill 534 – relating to rules governing the Milwaukee Public Schools.

== Major legislation ==
- January 29, 2009: Act relating to payment of Wisconsin supplemental and extended unemployment insurance benefits in this state. 2009 Wisc. Act 1
- May 15, 2009: Act relating to eligibility for unemployment insurance benefits and payment of extended benefits; excluding recovery and reinvestment act moneys from the calculation of expenditure restraint payments; eligibility for participation in the programs of a community action agency; financial assistance under the Clean Water Fund Program and the Safe Drinking Water Loan Program; the confidentiality of pupil records provided to the Department of Public Instruction; financial assistance for criminal justice programs; authorizing political subdivisions to make residential energy efficiency improvement loans and impose special charges for the loans; definition of low-income household under energy and weatherization assistance programs; eligibility and notice changes for state continuation of coverage for health insurance; changes to enterprise zone jobs credits; state aid to school districts; providing an exemption from emergency rule procedures; granting rule-making authority; and making an appropriation. 2009 Wisc. Act 11
- June 11, 2009: Act relating to the payment of state school aid in June 2009. 2009 Wisc. Act 23
- December 22, 2009: Act relating to operating a vehicle while intoxicated, granting rule-making authority, making an appropriation, and providing a penalty. 2009 Wisc. Act 100 – lowering the legal blood-alcohol limit for operating a vehicle from 0.1 to 0.08, among other changes to law.
- May 18, 2010: Act relating to financial assistance related to bioenergy feedstocks, biorefineries, and conversion to biomass energy; the definition of the term agricultural use for the purpose of determining the assessed value of a parcel of land; requiring a strategic bioenergy feedstock assessment; creation of a bioenergy council; the agricultural and forestry diversification programs; biofuels training assessment; a study of regulatory burdens relating to biofuel production facilities; marketing orders and agreements for bioenergy feedstocks; exempting personal renewable fuel production and use from the motor vehicle fuel tax, the petroleum inspection fee, and business tax registration requirements; an income and franchise tax credit for installing or retrofitting pumps that mix motor vehicle fuels from separate storage tanks; offering gasoline that is not blended with ethanol to motor fuel dealers; state renewable motor vehicle fuels sales goals; use of petroleum-based transportation fuels by state vehicles; use of alternative fuels in flex fuel vehicles owned by the state; use of public alternative fuel refueling facilities; duties of the Office of Energy Independence; granting rule-making authority; requiring the exercise of rule-making authority; making appropriations; and providing penalties. 2009 Wisc. Act 401

== Party summary ==
=== Senate summary ===
Senate Partisan composition Democratic: 18 seats Republican: 15 seats

	Party (Shading indicates majority caucus)		Total	
	Dem.	Rep.	Total	Vacant
End of previous Legislature	17	14	31	2
Start of Reg. Session	18	15	33	0
Final voting share	54.55%	45.45%		
Beginning of the next Legislature	14	19	33	0

=== Assembly summary ===
Assembly Partisan composition Democratic: 52 seats Independent: 1 seat Republican: 46 seats

	Party (Shading indicates majority caucus)			Total	
	Dem.	Ind.	Rep.	Total	Vacant
End of previous Legislature	47	0	52	99	0
Start of Reg. Session	52	1	46	99	0
From May 12, 2010 (Note: Democrat Gary Sherman (74th District) resigned to accept appointment to the Wisconsin Court of Appeals.)	51	1	46	98	1
From Jun. 21, 2010 (Note: Democrat Bob Ziegelbauer (25th District) changed his party affiliation to Independent.)	50	2	46	98	1
From Jul. 31, 2010 (Note: Republican Mark Gundrum (84th District) resigned after his election as a Wisconsin circuit court judge.)	50	2	45	97	2
From Sep. 20, 2010 (Note: Democrat Pedro Colón (8th District) resigned to accept appointment as a Wisconsin circuit court judge.)	49	2	45	96	3
Final voting share	51.04%	2.08%	46.88%		
Beginning of the next Legislature	38	1	57	96	3

== Sessions ==
- Regular session: January 5, 2009 – May 26, 2010
- May 2009 extraordinary session: May 12, 2009 – May 13, 2009
- June 2009 extraordinary session: June 9, 2009 – June 11, 2009
- June 2009 special session: June 24, 2009 – June 27, 2009
- December 2009 extraordinary session: December 16, 2009
- December 2009 special session: December 16, 2009 – March 4, 2010
- December 2010 extraordinary session: December 15, 2010 – December 16, 2010

== Leadership ==
=== Senate leadership ===
- President of the Senate: Fred Risser (D–Madison)
- President pro tempore: Pat Kreitlow (D–Chippewa Falls)

==== Senate majority leadership ====
- Majority Leader: Russ Decker (D–Weston) (until Dec. 15, 2010)
  - Dave Hansen (D–Green Bay) (after Dec. 15, 2010)
- Assistant Majority Leader: Dave Hansen (D–Green Bay) (until Dec. 15, 2010)
- Majority Caucus Chair: John W. Lehman (D–Racine)
- Majority Caucus Vice Chair: Kathleen Vinehout (D–Alma)
- Majority Caucus Sergeant-at-Arms: Jim Holperin (D–Conover)

==== Senate minority leadership ====
- Minority Leader: Scott L. Fitzgerald (R–Juneau)
- Assistant Minority Leader: Glenn Grothman (R–West Bend)
- Minority Caucus Chair: Joe Leibham (R–Sheboygan)
- Minority Caucus Vice Chair: Sheila Harsdorf (R–River Falls)

=== Assembly leadership ===
- Speaker of the Assembly: Michael J. Sheridan (D–Janesville)
- Speaker pro tempore: Tony Staskunas (D–West Allis)

==== Assembly majority leadership ====
- Assembly Majority Leader: Tom Nelson (D–Kaukauna)
- Assistant Majority Leader: Donna J. Seidel (D–Wausau)
- Assembly Caucus Chair: Peter W. Barca (D–Kenosha)
- Assembly Caucus Vice Chair: Barbara Toles (D–Milwaukee)
- Assembly Caucus Secretary: Ann Hraychuck (D–Balsam Lake)
- Assembly Caucus Sergeant-at-Arms: Marlin Schneider (D–Wisconsin Rapids)

==== Assembly minority leadership ====
- Assembly Minority Leader: Jeff Fitzgerald (R–Horicon)
- Assistant Minority Leader: Mark Gottlieb (R–Port Washington)
- Assembly Caucus Chair: Scott Suder (R–Abbotsford)
- Assembly Caucus Vice Chair: Joel Kleefisch (R–Oconomowoc)
- Assembly Caucus Secretary: Mary Williams (R–Medford)
- Assembly Caucus Sergeant-at-Arms: Gary Tauchen (R–Bonduel)

== Members ==
=== Members of the Senate ===
Members of the Senate for the Ninety-Ninth Wisconsin Legislature:

Senate partisan representation Democratic: 18 seats Republican: 15 seats

Dist.	Senator	Party	Age (2009)	Home	First elected
01	Alan Lasee	Rep.	71	Rockland, Brown County	1977
02	Robert Cowles	Rep.	58	Green Bay, Brown County	1987
03	Tim Carpenter	Dem.	48	Milwaukee, Milwaukee County	2002
04	Lena Taylor	Dem.	42	Milwaukee, Milwaukee County	2004
05	Jim Sullivan	Dem.	41	Wauwatosa, Milwaukee County	2006
06	Spencer Coggs	Dem.	59	Milwaukee, Milwaukee County	2003
07	Jeffrey Plale	Dem.	40	South Milwaukee, Milwaukee County	2003
08	Alberta Darling	Rep.	64	River Hills, Milwaukee County	1992
09	Joe Leibham	Rep.	39	Sheboygan, Sheboygan County	2002
10	Sheila Harsdorf	Rep.	52	River Falls, Pierce County	2000
11	Neal Kedzie	Rep.	52	Elkhorn, Walworth County	2002
12	Jim Holperin	Dem.	58	Conover, Shawano County	2008
13	Scott L. Fitzgerald	Rep.	45	Juneau, Dodge County	1994
14	Luther Olsen	Rep.	57	Ripon, Fond du Lac County	2004
15	Judy Robson	Dem.	70	Beloit, Rock County	1998
16	Mark Miller	Dem.	65	Monona, Dane County	2004
17	Dale Schultz	Rep.	55	Richland Center, Richland County	1991
18	Randy Hopper	Rep.	42	Fond du Lac, Fond du Lac County	2008
19	Michael G. Ellis	Rep.	67	Neenah, Winnebago County	1982
20	Glenn Grothman	Rep.	53	West Bend, Washington County	2004
21	John W. Lehman	Dem.	63	Racine, Racine County	2006
22	Robert Wirch	Dem.	65	Pleasant Prairie, Kenosha County	1996
23	Pat Kreitlow	Dem.	44	Chippewa Falls, Chippewa County	2006
24	Julie Lassa	Dem.	38	Stevens Point, Portage County	2003
25	Robert Jauch	Dem.	63	Poplar, Douglas County	1986
26	Fred Risser	Dem.	81	Madison, Dane County	1962
27	Jon Erpenbach	Dem.	47	Middleton, Dane County	1998
28	Mary Lazich	Rep.	56	New Berlin, Waukesha County	1998
29	Russ Decker	Dem.	55	Schofield, Marathon County	1990
30	Dave Hansen	Dem.	61	Green Bay, Brown County	2000
31	Kathleen Vinehout	Dem.	50	Alma, Buffalo County	2006
32	Dan Kapanke	Rep.	61	La Crosse, La Crosse County	2004
33	Theodore Kanavas	Rep.	47	Brookfield, Waukesha County	2001

=== Members of the Assembly ===
Members of the Assembly for the Ninety-Ninth Wisconsin Legislature:

Assembly partisan representation Democratic: 52 seats Independent: 1 seat Republican: 46 seats

Senate District	Assembly District	Representative	Party	Age (2009)	Home	First Elected
01	01	Garey Bies	Rep.	62	Sister Bay	2000
01	02	Ted Zigmunt	Dem.	57	Francis Creek	2008
01	03	Alvin Ott	Rep.	59	Brillion	1986
02	04	Phil Montgomery	Rep.	51	Green Bay	1998
02	05	Tom Nelson	Dem.	32	Kaukauna	2004
02	06	Gary Tauchen	Rep.	55	Bonduel	2006
03	07	Peggy Krusick	Dem.	52	Milwaukee	1983
03	08	Pedro Colón (res. Sep. 20, 2010)	Dem.	40	Milwaukee	1998
03	08	--Vacant from Sep. 20, 2010--				
03	09	Josh Zepnick	Dem.	40	Milwaukee	2002
04	10	Annette Polly Williams	Dem.	71	Milwaukee	1980
04	11	Jason Fields	Dem.	34	Milwaukee	2004
04	12	Fred Kessler	Dem.	68	Milwaukee	1960
05	13	David Cullen	Dem.	48	Milwaukee	1990
05	14	Leah Vukmir	Rep.	50	Wauwatosa	2002
05	15	Tony Staskunas	Dem.	47	West Allis	1996
06	16	Leon Young	Dem.	41	Milwaukee	1992
06	17	Barbara Toles	Dem.	52	Milwaukee	2004
06	18	Tamara Grigsby	Dem.	34	Milwaukee	2004
07	19	Jon Richards	Dem.	45	Milwaukee	1998
07	20	Christine Sinicki	Dem.	48	Milwaukee	1998
07	21	Mark Honadel	Rep.	52	South Milwaukee	2003
08	22	Sandy Pasch	Dem.	54	Whitefish Bay	2008
08	23	Jim Ott	Rep.	61	Mequon	2006
08	24	Dan Knodl	Rep.	50	Germantown	2008
09	25	Bob Ziegelbauer	Dem.	57	Manitowoc	1992
09	26	Terry Van Akkeren	Dem.	54	Sheboygan	2002
09	27	Steve Kestell	Rep.	53	Elkhart Lake	1998
10	28	Ann Hraychuck	Dem.	57	Balsam Lake	2006
10	29	John Murtha	Rep.	57	Baldwin	2006
10	30	Kitty Rhoades	Rep.	57	Hudson	1998
11	31	Stephen Nass	Rep.	56	La Grange	1990
11	32	Thomas Lothian	Rep.	80	Williams Bay	2002
11	33	Scott Newcomer	Rep.	43	Pewaukee	2006
12	34	Dan Meyer	Rep.	60	Eagle River	1998
12	35	Donald Friske	Rep.	47	Merrill	2000
12	36	Jeffrey Mursau	Rep.	54	Crivitz	2004
13	37	Andy Jorgensen	Dem.	41	Fort Atkinson	2004
13	38	Joel Kleefisch	Rep.	37	Oconomowoc	2004
13	39	Jeff Fitzgerald	Rep.	42	Horicon	2000
14	40	Kevin David Petersen	Rep.	44	Waupaca	2006
14	41	Joan Ballweg	Rep.	56	Markesan	2004
14	42	Fred Clark	Dem.	49	Baraboo	2008
15	43	Kim Hixson	Dem.	51	Whitewater	2006
15	44	Michael J. Sheridan	Dem.	50	Janesville	2004
15	45	Chuck Benedict	Dem.	62	Beloit	2004
16	46	Gary Hebl	Dem.	57	Sun Prairie	2004
16	47	Keith Ripp	Rep.	47	Lodi	2008
16	48	Joe Parisi	Dem.	48	Madison	2004
17	49	Phil Garthwaite	Dem.	36	Fennimore	2006
17	50	Ed Brooks	Rep.	66	Reedsburg	1991
17	51	Steve Hilgenberg	Dem.	64	Dodgeville	2006
18	52	John Townsend	Rep.	70	Fond du Lac	1998
18	53	Richard Spanbauer	Rep.	62	Oshkosh	2008
18	54	Gordon Hintz	Dem.	36	Oshkosh	2006
19	55	Dean Kaufert	Rep.	51	Neenah	1990
19	56	Roger Roth	Rep.	30	Appleton	2006
19	57	Penny Bernard Schaber	Dem.	55	Appleton	2008
20	58	Patricia Strachota	Rep.	53	West Bend	2004
20	59	Daniel LeMahieu	Rep.	62	Cascade	2002
20	60	Mark Gottlieb	Rep.	52	Port Washington	2002
21	61	Robert L. Turner	Dem.	61	Racine	1990
21	62	Cory Mason	Dem.	35	Racine	2006
21	63	Robin Vos	Rep.	40	Caledonia	2004
22	64	Peter W. Barca	Dem.	53	Kenosha	1984
22	65	John Steinbrink	Dem.	59	Pleasant Prairie	1996
22	66	Samantha Kerkman	Rep.	34	Randall	2000
23	67	Jeffrey Wood	Ind.	39	Chippewa Falls	2002
23	68	Kristen Dexter	Dem.	47	Eau Claire	2008
23	69	Scott Suder	Rep.	40	Abbotsford	1998
24	70	Amy Sue Vruwink	Dem.	33	Milladore	2002
24	71	Louis Molepske	Dem.	34	Stevens Point	2003
24	72	Marlin Schneider	Dem.	66	Wisconsin Rapids	1970
25	73	Nick Milroy	Dem.	34	Superior	2008
25	74	Gary Sherman (res. May 12, 2010)	Dem.	59	Port Wing	1998
25	74	--Vacant from May 12, 2010--				
25	75	Mary Hubler	Dem.	56	Rice Lake	1984
26	76	Terese Berceau	Dem.	58	Madison	1998
26	77	Spencer Black	Dem.	58	Madison	1984
26	78	Mark Pocan	Dem.	44	Madison	1998
27	79	Sondy Pope-Roberts	Dem.	58	Middleton	2002
27	80	Brett Davis	Rep.	33	Oregon	2004
27	81	Kelda Roys	Dem.	29	Madison	2008
28	82	Jeff Stone	Rep.	47	Greendale	1978
28	83	Scott Gunderson	Rep.	52	Waterford	1994
28	84	Mark Gundrum (res. Jul. 31, 2010)	Rep.	38	New Berlin	1998
28	84	--Vacant from Jul. 31, 2010--				
29	85	Donna Seidel	Dem.	58	Wausau	2004
29	86	Jerry Petrowski	Rep.	58	Marathon	1998
29	87	Mary Williams	Rep.	59	Medford	2002
30	88	James Soletski	Dem.	60	Green Bay	2006
30	89	John Nygren	Rep.	44	Marinette	2006
30	90	Karl Van Roy	Rep.	70	Green Bay	2002
31	91	Chris Danou	Dem.	41	Trempealeau	2008
31	92	Mark A. Radcliffe	Dem.	37	Black River Falls	2008
31	93	Jeff Smith	Dem.	53	Eau Claire	2006
32	94	Michael Huebsch	Rep.	44	West Salem	1994
32	95	Jennifer Shilling	Dem.	39	La Crosse	2000
32	96	Lee Nerison	Rep.	56	Westby	2004
33	97	Bill Kramer	Rep.	43	Waukesha	2006
33	98	Rich Zipperer	Rep.	34	Pewaukee	2006
33	99	Don Pridemore	Rep.	62	Hartford	2004

== Employees ==
=== Senate employees ===
- Chief Clerk: Robert J. Marchant
- Sergeant-at-Arms: Edward A. Blazel

=== Assembly employees ===
- Chief Clerk: Patrick E. Fuller
- Sergeant-at-Arms: William M. Nagy

== Changes from the 98th Legislature ==
=== Senate ===
==== Open seats ====
- In the 12th Senate district, Democrat Roger Breske was appointed Railroad Commissioner, leaving Democrat Jim Holperin to defeat Republican Tom Tiffany.
- In the 18th Senate district, Republican Carol Roessler was appointed Administrator of State and Local Finance, leaving Republican Randy Hopper to defeat Democrat Jessica King.

=== Assembly ===
==== Open seats ====
- In the 22nd Assembly district, Democrat Sheldon Wasserman ran for the Wisconsin State Senate, leaving fellow Democrat Sandy Pasch to defeat Republican Yash Wadhwa
- In the 24th Assembly district, Republican Suzanne Jeskewitz decided not to run for re-election, leaving Republican Dan Knodl to defeat Democrat Charlene Brady.
- In the 47th Assembly district, Republican Eugene Hahn declined to run for re-election, leaving Republican Keith Ripp to defeat Democrat Trish O'Neil in the contest for the open seat.
- In the 50th Assembly district, Republican Sheryl Albers retired, leaving Republican Ed Brooks to defeat Democrat Tom Crofton
- In the 53rd Assembly district, Republican Carol Owens retired, leaving Republican Richard Spanbauer to defeat Democrat Jeff Mann.
- In the 57th Assembly District, Republican Steve Wieckert retired, and Democrat Penny Bernard Schaber defeated Republican Jo Egelhoff in the general election
- In the 64th Assembly District, Democrat James Kreuser became County Executive for Kenosha County, leaving former Congressman and fellow Democrat Peter Barca to retake his former seat, running unopposed in the general election.
- In the 73rd Assembly district, Democrat Frank Boyle retired, leaving Democrat Nick Milroy to defeat the independent Jeff Monaghan.
- In the 81st Assembly district, Democrat David Travis retired, leaving Democrat Kelda Roys to win the seat after running unopposed in the general election.
- In the 91st Assembly district, Democrat Barbara Gronemus retired, leaving Democrat Chris Danou to defeat Republican Dave Hegenbarth.
- In the 92nd Assembly district, Republican Terry Musser retired, leaving Democrat Mark Radcliffe to defeat Dan Hellman

==== Incumbents defeated ====
- In the 2nd Assembly district, Republican Frank Lasee was defeated in the general election by Democrat Ted Zigmunt.
- In the 42nd Assembly district, Republican J.A. Hines lost his bid for re-election against Democrat Fred Clark
- In the 68th Assembly district, Republican Terry Moulton was defeated by Democrat Kristen Dexter.

==== Party affiliation ====
- In the 67th Assembly district, Jeffrey Wood successfully ran for re-election as an independent after dropping his affiliation with the Republican Party in 2008.
