= 97th Wisconsin Legislature =

Wisconsin legislative term for 2005-2006

←	96th	98th	→
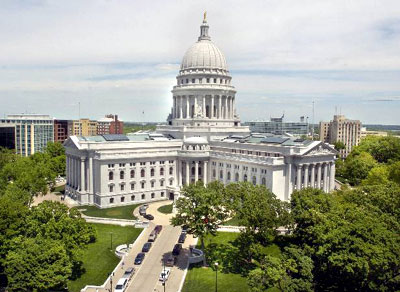
- Wisconsin State Capitol

Overview
- Legislative body: Wisconsin Legislature
- Meeting place: Wisconsin State Capitol
- Term: January 3, 2005 – January 1, 2007
- Election: November 2, 2004

Senate
- Members: 33
- Senate President: Alan Lasee (R)
- President pro tempore: David Zien (R)
- Party control: Republican

Assembly
- Members: 99
- Assembly Speaker: John Gard (R)
- Speaker pro tempore: Stephen Freese (R)
- Party control: Republican

Sessions
- Regular: January 3, 2005 – January 3, 2007

Special sessions
- Jan. 2005 Spec.: January 12, 2005 – January 20, 2005
- Jul. 2005 Extra.: July 20, 2005 – July 20, 2005
- Feb. 2006 Spec.: February 14, 2006 – March 7, 2006
- Apr. 2006 Extra.: April 25, 2006 – May 17, 2006

The Ninety-Seventh Wisconsin Legislature convened from January 3, 2005, to January 3, 2007, in regular session, and held two concurrent special sessions in January 2005 and February 2006, and two extraordinary sessions in July 2005 and April 2006.

Senators representing even-numbered districts were newly elected for this session and were serving the first two years of a four-year term. Assembly members were elected to a two-year term. Assembly members and even-numbered senators were elected in the general election of November 2, 2004. Senators representing odd-numbered districts were serving the third and fourth year of their four-year term, having been elected in the general election of November 5, 2002.

The governor of Wisconsin during this entire term was Democrat Jim Doyle, of Dane County, serving the second two years of a four-year term, having won election in the 2002 Wisconsin gubernatorial election.

== Major events ==
- January 20, 2005: Second inauguration of George W. Bush as President of the United States.
- April 5, 2005: 2005 Wisconsin spring election:
  - Wisconsin voters ratified an amendment to the state constitution to double the terms of several county officers from two years to four years.
- November 7, 2006: 2006 United States general election:
  - Jim Doyle (D) re-elected Governor of Wisconsin.
  - Wisconsin voters ratified an amendment to the state constitution defining marriage as between one man and one woman.

== Party summary ==
=== Senate summary ===
Senate partisan composition Democratic: 14 seats Republican: 19 seats

	Party (Shading indicates majority caucus)		Total	
	Democratic	Republican	Total	Vacant
End of previous Legislature	15	18	33	0
Start of session	14	19	33	0
Final voting share	42.42%	57.58%		
Beginning of the next Legislature	18	15	33	0

=== Assembly summary ===
Assembly partisan composition Democratic: 39 seats Republican: 60 seats

	Party (Shading indicates majority caucus)		Total	
	Democratic	Republican	Total	Vacant
End of previous Legislature	40	59	99	0
Start of session	39	60	99	0
From Oct. 31, 2005 (Note: Republican Daniel P. Vrakas (District 33) resigned after being elected county executive.)	39	59	98	1
From Jan. 17, 2006 (Note: Republican Scott Newcomer (District 33) was sworn in to replace Daniel P. Vrakas.)	39	60	99	0
From Mar. 21, 2006 (Note: Republican Scott Jensen (District 98) resigned.)	39	59	98	1
From Aug. 2, 2006 (Note: Republican David W. Ward (District 37) resigned.)	39	58	97	2
Final voting share	40.21%	59.79%		
Beginning of the next Legislature	47	52	99	0

== Sessions ==
- Regular session: January 3, 2005 – January 3, 2007
- January 2005 special session: January 12, 2005 – January 20, 2005
- July 2005 extraordinary session: July 20, 2005
- February 2006 special session: February 14, 2006 – March 7, 2006
- April 2006 extraordinary session: April 25, 2006 – May 17, 2006

== Leadership ==
=== Senate leadership ===
- President of the Senate: Alan Lasee (R–Rockland)
- President pro tempore: David Zien (R–Wheaton)

Majority leadership (Republican)

- Majority Leader: Dale Schultz (R–Richland Center)
- Assistant Majority Leader: Neal Kedzie (R–Elkhorn)
- Majority Caucus Chairperson: Ron Brown (R–Eau Claire)

Minority leadership (Democratic)

- Minority Leader: Judy Robson (D–Beloit)
- Assistant Minority Leader: Dave Hansen (D–Green Bay)
- Minority Caucus Chairperson: Jeffrey Plale (D–South Milwaukee)

=== Assembly leadership ===
- Speaker of the Assembly: John Gard (R–Peshtigo)
- Speaker pro tempore: Stephen Freese (R–Jamestown)

Majority leadership (Republican)

- Majority Leader: Michael Huebsch (R–West Salem)
- Assistant Majority Leader: Jeff Fitzgerald (R–Horicon)
- Majority Caucus Chairperson: Daniel P. Vrakas (R–Delafield) (until Oct. 31, 2005)
  - Mark Gundrum (R–New Berlin) (after Oct. 31, 2005)
- Majority Caucus Vice Chairperson: Mark Gottlieb (R–Port Washington)
- Majority Caucus Secretary: Carol Owens (R–Nekimi)
- Majority Caucus Sergeant at Arms: Jerry Petrowski (R–Stettin)

Minority leadership (Democratic)

- Minority Leader: James Kreuser (D–Kenosha)
- Assistant Minority Leader: Jon Richards (D–Milwaukee)
- Minority Caucus Chairperson: Robert L. Turner (D–Racine)
- Minority Caucus Vice Chairperson: Gary Sherman (D–Port Wing)
- Minority Caucus Secretary: Amy Sue Vruwink (D–Milladore)
- Minority Caucus Sergeant at Arms: Jennifer Shilling (D–La Crosse)

== Members ==
=== Members of the Senate ===
Members of the Wisconsin Senate for the Ninety-Seventh Wisconsin Legislature:

Senate partisan representation Democratic: 14 seats Republican: 19 seats

Dist.	Senator	Party	Age (2005)	Home	First elected
01	Alan Lasee	Rep.	67	Rockland, Brown County	1977
02	Robert Cowles	Rep.	54	Green Bay, Brown County	1987
03	Tim Carpenter	Dem.	44	Milwaukee, Milwaukee County	2002
04	Lena Taylor	Dem.	38	Milwaukee, Milwaukee County	2004
05	Tom Reynolds	Rep.	48	West Allis, Milwaukee County	2002
06	Spencer Coggs	Dem.	55	Milwaukee, Milwaukee County	2003
07	Jeffrey Plale	Dem.	36	South Milwaukee, Milwaukee County	2003
08	Alberta Darling	Rep.	60	River Hills, Milwaukee County	1992
09	Joe Leibham	Rep.	35	Sheboygan, Sheboygan County	2002
10	Sheila Harsdorf	Rep.	48	River Falls, Pierce County	2000
11	Neal Kedzie	Rep.	48	Elkhorn, Walworth County	2002
12	Roger Breske	Dem.	66	Elderon, Marathon County	1990
13	Scott L. Fitzgerald	Rep.	41	Clyman, Dodge County	1994
14	Luther Olsen	Rep.	53	Ripon, Fond du Lac County	2004
15	Judy Robson	Dem.	65	Beloit, Rock County	1987
16	Mark F. Miller	Dem.	61	Monona, Dane County	2004
17	Dale Schultz	Rep.	51	Richland Center, Richland County	1991
18	Carol Roessler	Rep.	56	Oshkosh, Winnebago County	1987
19	Michael G. Ellis	Rep.	63	Neenah, Winnebago County	1982
20	Glenn Grothman	Rep.	49	West Bend, Washington County	2004
21	Cathy Stepp	Rep.	41	Sturtevant, Racine County	2002
22	Robert Wirch	Dem.	61	Pleasant Prairie, Kenosha County	1996
23	David Zien	Rep.	54	Wheaton, Chippewa County	1993
24	Julie Lassa	Dem.	34	Stevens Point, Portage County	2003
25	Robert Jauch	Dem.	59	Poplar, Douglas County	1986
26	Fred Risser	Dem.	77	Madison, Dane County	1962
27	Jon Erpenbach	Dem.	43	Middleton, Dane County	1998
28	Mary Lazich	Rep.	52	New Berlin, Waukesha County	1998
29	Russ Decker	Dem.	51	Weston, Marathon County	1990
30	Dave Hansen	Dem.	57	Green Bay, Brown County	2000
31	Ron Brown	Rep.	58	Eau Claire, Eau Claire County	2002
32	Dan Kapanke	Rep.	57	La Crosse, La Crosse County	2004
33	Theodore Kanavas	Rep.	43	Brookfield, Waukesha County	2001

=== Members of the Assembly ===
Members of the Assembly for the Ninety-Seventh Wisconsin Legislature:

Assembly partisan representation Democratic: 39 seats Republican: 60 seats

Senate District	Assembly District	Representative	Party	Age (2005)	Home	First Elected
01	01	Garey Bies	Rep.	58	Sister Bay	2000
01	02	Frank Lasee	Rep.	43	Bellevue	1994
01	03	Alvin Ott	Rep.	55	Brillion	1986
02	04	Phil Montgomery	Rep.	47	Ashwaubenon	1998
02	05	Tom Nelson	Dem.	28	Kaukauna	2004
02	06	John Ainsworth	Rep.	64	Waukechon	1990
03	07	Peggy Krusick	Dem.	48	Milwaukee	1983
03	08	Pedro Colón	Dem.	36	Milwaukee	1998
03	09	Josh Zepnick	Dem.	36	Milwaukee	2002
04	10	Annette P. Williams	Dem.	67	Milwaukee	1980
04	11	Jason Fields	Dem.	30	Milwaukee	2004
04	12	Fred Kessler	Dem.	64	Milwaukee	1960
05	13	David Cullen	Dem.	44	Milwaukee	1990
05	14	Leah Vukmir	Rep.	46	Wauwatosa	2002
05	15	Tony Staskunas	Dem.	43	West Allis	1996
06	16	Leon Young	Dem.	37	Milwaukee	1992
06	17	Barbara Toles	Dem.	48	Milwaukee	2004
06	18	Tamara Grigsby	Dem.	30	Milwaukee	2004
07	19	Jon Richards	Dem.	41	Milwaukee	1998
07	20	Christine Sinicki	Dem.	44	Milwaukee	1998
07	21	Mark Honadel	Rep.	48	South Milwaukee	2003
08	22	Sheldon Wasserman	Dem.	43	Milwaukee	1994
08	23	Curt Gielow	Rep.	59	Mequon	2002
08	24	Suzanne Jeskewitz	Rep.	62	Menomonee Falls	1996
09	25	Bob Ziegelbauer	Dem.	53	Manitowoc	1992
09	26	Terry Van Akkeren	Dem.	50	Sheboygan	2002
09	27	Steve Kestell	Rep.	49	Herman	1998
10	28	Mark Pettis	Rep.	54	Hertel	1998
10	29	Andy Lamb	Rep.	31	Menomonie	2004
10	30	Kitty Rhoades	Rep.	53	Hudson	1998
11	31	Stephen Nass	Rep.	52	Whitewater	1990
11	32	Thomas Lothian	Rep.	76	Williams Bay	2002
11	33	Daniel P. Vrakas (res. Oct. 31, 2005)	Rep.	49	Hartland	1990
11	33	Scott Newcomer (res. Jan. 17, 2006)	Rep.	40	Hartland	2006
12	34	Dan Meyer	Rep.	56	Eagle River	2000
12	35	Donald Friske	Rep.	43	Merrill	2000
12	36	Jeffrey Mursau	Rep.	50	Crivitz	2004
13	37	David Ward (res. Aug. 2, 2006)	Rep.	51	Oakland	1992
13	37	--Vacant from Aug. 2, 2006--				
13	38	Joel Kleefisch	Rep.	33	Oconomowoc	2004
13	39	Jeff Fitzgerald	Rep.	38	Horicon	2000
14	40	Jean Hundertmark	Rep.	50	Clintonville	1998
14	41	Joan Ballweg	Rep.	52	Markesan	2004
14	42	J. A. Hines	Rep.	77	Oxford	2001
15	43	Debi Towns	Rep.	48	Janesville	2002
15	44	Michael J. Sheridan	Dem.	46	Janesville	2004
15	45	Chuck Benedict	Dem.	58	Beloit	2004
16	46	Gary Hebl	Dem.	53	Sun Prairie	2004
16	47	Eugene Hahn	Rep.	75	Springvale	1990
16	48	Joe Parisi	Dem.	44	Madison	2004
17	49	Gabe Loeffelholz	Rep.	64	Platteville	2000
17	50	Sheryl Albers	Rep.	50	Reedsburg	1991
17	51	Stephen Freese	Rep.	44	Dodgeville	1990
18	52	John Townsend	Rep.	66	Fond du Lac	1998
18	53	Carol Owens	Rep.	73	Nekimi	1992
18	54	Gregg Underheim	Rep.	54	Oshkosh	1987
19	55	Dean Kaufert	Rep.	47	Neenah	1990
19	56	Terri McCormick	Rep.	48	Appleton	2000
19	57	Steve Wieckert	Rep.	50	Appleton	1996
20	58	Patricia Strachota	Rep.	49	West Bend	2004
20	59	Daniel LeMahieu	Rep.	58	Oostburg	2002
20	60	Mark Gottlieb	Rep.	48	Port Washington	2002
21	61	Robert L. Turner	Dem.	57	Racine	1990
21	62	John Lehman	Dem.	59	Racine	1996
21	63	Robin Vos	Rep.	36	Caledonia	2004
22	64	James Kreuser	Dem.	43	Kenosha	1993
22	65	John Steinbrink	Dem.	55	Pleasant Prairie	1996
22	66	Samantha Kerkman	Rep.	30	Burlington	2000
23	67	Jeffrey Wood	Rep.	35	Chippewa Falls	2002
23	68	Terry Moulton	Rep.	58	Chippewa Falls	2004
23	69	Scott Suder	Rep.	36	Abbotsford	1998
24	70	Amy Sue Vruwink	Dem.	29	Milladore	2002
24	71	Louis Molepske	Dem.	30	Stevens Point	2003
24	72	Marlin Schneider	Dem.	62	Wisconsin Rapids	1970
25	73	Frank Boyle	Dem.	59	Summit	1986
25	74	Gary Sherman	Dem.	55	Port Wing	1998
25	75	Mary Hubler	Dem.	55	Rice Lake	1984
26	76	Terese Berceau	Dem.	54	Madison	1998
26	77	Spencer Black	Dem.	54	Madison	1984
26	78	Mark Pocan	Dem.	40	Madison	1998
27	79	Sondy Pope-Roberts	Dem.	54	Verona	2002
27	80	Brett Davis	Rep.	29	Oregon	2004
27	81	David Travis	Dem.	56	Waunakee	1978
28	82	Jeff Stone	Rep.	43	Greendale	1998
28	83	Scott Gunderson	Rep.	48	Waterford	1994
28	84	Mark Gundrum	Rep.	34	New Berlin	1998
29	85	Donna J. Seidel	Dem.	54	Wausau	2004
29	86	Jerry Petrowski	Rep.	54	Stettin	1998
29	87	Mary Williams	Rep.	55	Medford	2002
30	88	Judy Krawczyk	Rep.	65	Green Bay	2000
30	89	John Gard	Rep.	41	Peshtigo	1987
30	90	Karl Van Roy	Rep.	66	Green Bay	2002
31	91	Barbara Gronemus	Dem.	73	Whitehall	1982
31	92	Terry Musser	Rep.	57	Irving	1984
31	93	Robin Kreibich	Rep.	45	Eau Claire	1992
32	94	Michael Huebsch	Rep.	40	West Salem	1994
32	95	Jennifer Shilling	Dem.	35	La Crosse	2000
32	96	Lee Nerison	Rep.	52	Westby	2004
33	97	Ann Nischke	Rep.	53	Waukesha	2002
33	98	Scott Jensen (res. Mar. 21, 2006)	Rep.	44	Waukesha	1992
33	98	--Vacant from Mar. 21, 2006--				
33	99	Don Pridemore	Rep.	58	Hartford	2004
