= 96th Wisconsin Legislature =

Wisconsin legislative term for 2003-2004

| ← | 95th | 97th | → |
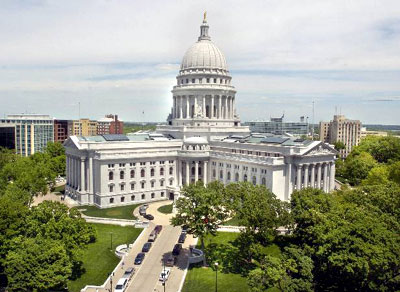
- Wisconsin State Capitol

Overview
- Legislative body: Wisconsin Legislature
- Meeting place: Wisconsin State Capitol
- Term: January 6, 2003 – January 3, 2005
- Election: November 5, 2002

Senate
- Members: 33
- Senate President: Alan Lasee (R)
- President pro tempore: Robert T. Welch (R)
- Party control: Republican

Assembly
- Members: 99
- Assembly Speaker: John Gard (R)
- Speaker pro tempore: Stephen Freese (R)
- Party control: Republican

Sessions
- Regular: January 6, 2003 – January 3, 2005

Special sessions
- Jan. 2003 Spec.: January 30, 2003 – February 20, 2003
- Feb. 2003 Extra.: February 20, 2003 – February 21, 2003
- Jul. 2003 Extra.: July 1, 2003 – July 2, 2003
- Aug. 2003 Extra.: August 11, 2003 – September 25, 2003
- Dec. 2003 Extra.: December 1, 2003 – February 5, 2004
- Mar. 2004 Extra.: March 11, 2004 – March 25, 2004
- May 2004 Extra.: May 18, 2004 – May 19, 2004
- Jul. 2004 Extra.: July 27, 2004 – July 28, 2004

The Ninety-Sixth Wisconsin Legislature convened from January 6, 2003, to January 3, 2005, in regular session, and held a concurrent special session from January 30, 2003, to February 20, 2003. They also held seven extraordinary sessions during the term.

This was the first legislative session after the redistricting of the Senate and Assembly according to the 2002 federal court decision, Baumgart v. Wendelberger.

Senators representing odd-numbered districts were newly elected for this session and were serving the first two years of a four-year term. Assembly members were elected to a two-year term. Assembly members and odd-numbered senators were elected in the general election of November 5, 2002. Senators representing even-numbered districts were serving the third and fourth year of their four-year term, having been elected in the general election of November 7, 2000.

The governor of Wisconsin during this entire term was Democrat Jim Doyle, of Dane County, serving the first two years of a four-year term, having won election in the 2002 Wisconsin gubernatorial election.

== Major events ==
- January 6, 2003: Inauguration of Jim Doyle as the 44th Governor of Wisconsin.
- February 1, 2003: U.S. Space Shuttle Columbia disintegrated during re-entry, killing all seven crew members aboard.
- March 20, 2003: The United States invaded Iraq, initiating the Iraq War.
- April 1, 2003: 2003 Wisconsin Spring election:
  - Patience D. Roggensack was elected to the Wisconsin Supreme Court to succeed William A. Bablitch.
  - Wisconsin voters ratified an amendment to the state constitution codifying the right to fish, hunt, trap, and take game.
- April 9, 2003: U.S. military forces seized control of Baghdad.
- April 14, 2003: The Human Genome Project was completed.
- May 28, 2003: The U.S. Jobs and Growth Tax Relief Reconciliation Act of 2003 was signed into law.
- July 14, 2003: Valerie Plame was outed as a CIA agent by columnist Robert Novak, initiating a scandal.
- December 8, 2003: The U.S. Medicare Prescription Drug, Improvement, and Modernization Act was signed into law.
- December 13, 2003: Saddam Hussein was captured by U.S. military forces in Ad-Dawr, Iraq.
- February 4, 2004: Facebook was created by Mark Zuckerberg at Harvard University.
- February 29, 2004: Haitian president Jean-Bertrand Aristide was overthrown in a coup d'état.
- March 29, 2004: Bulgaria, Estonia, Latvia, Lithuania, Romania, Slovakia, and Slovenia were admitted to NATO.
- May 17, 2004: Massachusetts became the first U.S. state to issue marriage licenses for Same-sex marriages.
- June 5, 2004: Former U.S. president Ronald Reagan died at his home in Los Angeles, California.
- September 13, 2004: The Federal Assault Weapons Ban expired.
- November 2, 2004: 2004 United States general election:
  - George W. Bush (R) re-elected as President of the United States.
  - Russ Feingold (D) re-elected as United States senator from Wisconsin.
- December 17, 2004: The U.S. Intelligence Reform and Terrorism Prevention Act was signed into law.
- December 26, 2004: The 2004 Indian Ocean earthquake and tsunami resulted in more than 200,000 deaths in southeast Asia.

== Party summary ==
=== Senate summary ===
Senate partisan composition Democratic: 15 seats Republican: 18 seats

| | Party (Shading indicates majority caucus) | | Total | |
| | Democratic | Republican | Total | Vacant |
|---|---|---|---|---|
| End of previous Legislature | 18 | 15 | 33 | 0 |
| Start of Reg. Session (Note: Democrats Richard Grobschmidt (District 7) and Kevin Shibilski (District 24) resigned before the start of the session to accept executive branch appointments.) | 13 | 18 | 31 | 2 |
| From May 9, 2003 (Note: Democrats Jeffrey Plale (District 7) and Julie Lassa (District 24) replaced Richard Grobschmidt and Kevin Shibilski, respectively.) | 15 | 18 | 33 | 0 |
| From Nov. 18, 2003 (Note: Democrat Gary R. George (District 6) was recalled from office.) | 14 | 18 | 32 | 1 |
| From Nov. 25, 2003 (Note: Democrat Spencer Coggs (District 6) was sworn in to replace Gary R. George.) | 15 | 18 | 33 | 0 |
| Final voting share | 45.45% | 54.55% | | |
| Beginning of the next Legislature | 14 | 19 | 33 | 0 |

=== Assembly summary ===
Assembly partisan composition Democratic: 40 seats Republican: 59 seats

| | Party (Shading indicates majority caucus) | | Total | |
| | Democratic | Republican | Total | Vacant |
|---|---|---|---|---|
| End of previous Legislature | 43 | 56 | 99 | 0 |
| Start of Reg. Session | 41 | 58 | 99 | 0 |
| From Feb. 1, 2003 (Note: Democrat Antonio R. Riley (District 18) resigned to accept an executive branch appointment.) | 40 | 58 | 98 | 1 |
| From Apr. 30, 2003 (Note: Democrat Lena Taylor (District 18) was sworn in to replace Antonio R. Riley.) | 41 | 58 | 99 | 0 |
| From May 9, 2003 (Note: Democrats Jeffrey Plale (District 21) and Julie Lassa (District 71) resigned after election to the Wisconsin Senate.) | 39 | 58 | 97 | 2 |
| From Aug. 4, 2003 (Note: Republican Mark Honadel (District 21) was sworn in to replace Jeffrey Plale.) | 39 | 59 | 98 | 1 |
| From Aug. 11, 2003 (Note: Democrat Louis Molepske (District 71) was sworn in to replace Julie Lassa.) | 40 | 59 | 99 | 0 |
| From Nov. 25, 2003 (Note: Democrat Spencer Coggs (District 17) resigned after his election to state senate.) | 39 | 59 | 98 | 1 |
| From Feb. 3, 2004 (Note: Democrat Barbara Toles (District 17) was sworn in to replace Spencer Coggs.) | 40 | 59 | 99 | 0 |
| Final voting share | 40.4% | 59.6% | | |
| Beginning of the next Legislature | 39 | 60 | 99 | 0 |

== Sessions ==
- Regular session: January 6, 2003 – January 3, 2005
- January 2003 Special session: January 30, 2003 – February 20, 2003
- February 2003 Extraordinary session: February 20, 2003 – February 21, 2003
- July 2003 Extraordinary session: July 1, 2003 – July 2, 2003
- August 2003 Extraordinary session: August 11, 2003 – September 25, 2003
- December 2003 Extraordinary session: December 1, 2003 – February 5, 2004
- March 2004 Extraordinary session: March 11, 2004 – March 25, 2004
- May 2004 Extraordinary session: May 18, 2004 – May 19, 2004
- July 2004 Extraordinary session: July 27, 2004 – July 28, 2004

== Leadership ==
=== Senate leadership ===
- President of the Senate: Alan Lasee (R–Rockland)
- President pro tempore: Robert Welch (R–Redgranite)

Majority leadership (Republican)

- Majority Leader: Mary Panzer (R–West Bend)
- Assistant Majority Leader: David Zien (R–Wheaton)
- Majority Caucus Chairperson: Mary Lazich (R–New Berlin)

Minority leadership (Democratic)

- Minority Leader: Jon Erpenbach (D–Middleton)
- Assistant Minority Leader: Dave Hansen (D–Green Bay)
- Minority Caucus Chairperson: Robert Wirch (D–Pleasant Prairie)

=== Assembly leadership ===
- Speaker of the Assembly: John Gard (R–Peshtigo)
- Speaker pro tempore: Stephen Freese (R–Jamestown)

Majority leadership (Republican)

- Majority Leader: Steven Foti (R–Oconomowoc)
- Assistant Majority Leader: Jean Hundertmark (R–Larrabee)
- Majority Caucus Chairperson: Daniel P. Vrakas (R–Delafield)
- Majority Caucus Vice Chairperson: Glenn Grothman (R–West Bend)
- Majority Caucus Secretary: Carol Owens (R–Nekimi)
- Majority Caucus Sergeant at Arms: Jerry Petrowski (R–Stettin)

Minority leadership (Democratic)

- Minority Leader: James Kreuser (D–Kenosha)
- Assistant Minority Leader: Jon Richards (D–Milwaukee)
- Minority Caucus Chairperson: Robert L. Turner (D–Racine)
- Minority Caucus Vice Chairperson: Gary Sherman (D–Port Wing)
- Minority Caucus Secretary: Amy Sue Vruwink (D–Milladore)
- Minority Caucus Sergeant at Arms: Jennifer Shilling (D–La Crosse)

== Members ==
=== Members of the Senate ===
Members of the Wisconsin Senate for the Ninety-Sixth Wisconsin Legislature:

Senate partisan representation Democratic: 15 seats Republican: 18 seats

| Dist. | Senator | Party | Age (2003) | Home | First elected |
|---|---|---|---|---|---|
| 01 | Alan Lasee | Rep. | 65 | De Pere, Brown County | 1977 |
| 02 | Robert Cowles | Rep. | 52 | Green Bay, Brown County | 1987 |
| 03 | Tim Carpenter | Dem. | 42 | Milwaukee, Milwaukee County | 2002 |
| 04 | Gwen Moore | Dem. | 51 | Milwaukee, Milwaukee County | 1992 |
| 05 | Tom Reynolds | Rep. | 46 | West Allis, Milwaukee County | 2002 |
| 06 | Gary R. George (rem. Nov. 18, 2003) | Dem. | 48 | Milwaukee, Milwaukee County | 1980 |
| 06 | Spencer Coggs (from Nov. 25, 2003) | Dem. | 54 | Milwaukee, Milwaukee County | 2003 |
| 07 | --Vacant until May 9, 2003-- | | | | |
| 07 | Jeffrey Plale (from May 9, 2003) | Dem. | 34 | South Milwaukee, Milwaukee County | 2003 |
| 08 | Alberta Darling | Rep. | 58 | River Hills, Milwaukee County | 1992 |
| 09 | Joe Leibham | Rep. | 33 | Sheboygan, Sheboygan County | 2002 |
| 10 | Sheila Harsdorf | Rep. | 46 | River Falls, Pierce County | 2000 |
| 11 | Neal Kedzie | Rep. | 46 | Elkhorn, Walworth County | 2002 |
| 12 | Roger Breske | Dem. | 64 | Eland, Shawano County | 1990 |
| 13 | Scott L. Fitzgerald | Rep. | 39 | Juneau, Dodge County | 1994 |
| 14 | Robert T. Welch | Rep. | 44 | Marion, Waushara County | 1995 |
| 15 | Judy Robson | Dem. | 63 | Beloit, Rock County | 1987 |
| 16 | Charles Chvala | Dem. | 48 | Monona, Dane County | 1984 |
| 17 | Dale Schultz | Rep. | 49 | Richland Center, Richland County | 1991 |
| 18 | Carol Roessler | Rep. | 54 | Oshkosh, Winnebago County | 1987 |
| 19 | Michael G. Ellis | Rep. | 61 | Neenah, Winnebago County | 1982 |
| 20 | Mary Panzer | Rep. | 51 | West Bend, Washington County | 1993 |
| 21 | Cathy Stepp | Rep. | 39 | Sturtevant, Racine County | 2002 |
| 22 | Robert Wirch | Dem. | 59 | Pleasant Prairie, Kenosha County | 1996 |
| 23 | David Zien | Rep. | 52 | Eau Claire, Eau Claire County | 1993 |
| 24 | --Vacant until May 9, 2003-- | | | | |
| 24 | Julie Lassa (from May 9, 2003) | Dem. | 32 | Stevens Point, Portage County | 2003 |
| 25 | Robert Jauch | Dem. | 57 | Poplar, Douglas County | 1986 |
| 26 | Fred Risser | Dem. | 75 | Madison, Dane County | 1962 |
| 27 | Jon Erpenbach | Dem. | 41 | Middleton, Dane County | 1998 |
| 28 | Mary Lazich | Rep. | 50 | New Berlin, Waukesha County | 1998 |
| 29 | Russ Decker | Dem. | 49 | Schofield, Marathon County | 1990 |
| 30 | Dave Hansen | Dem. | 55 | Green Bay, Brown County | 2000 |
| 31 | Ron Brown | Rep. | 56 | Eau Claire, Eau Claire County | 2002 |
| 32 | Mark Meyer | Dem. | 39 | La Crosse, La Crosse County | 2000 |
| 33 | Theodore Kanavas | Rep. | 41 | Brookfield, Waukesha County | 2001 |

=== Members of the Assembly ===
Members of the Assembly for the Ninety-Sixth Wisconsin Legislature:

Assembly partisan representation Democratic: 40 seats Republican: 59 seats

| Senate District | Assembly District | Representative | Party | Age (2003) | Residence | First elected |
|---|---|---|---|---|---|---|
| 01 | 01 | Garey Bies | Rep. | 56 | Sister Bay | 2000 |
| 01 | 02 | Frank Lasee | Rep. | 41 | Bellevue | 1994 |
| 01 | 03 | Alvin Ott | Rep. | 53 | Forest Junction | 1986 |
| 02 | 04 | Phil Montgomery | Rep. | 45 | Ashwaubenon | 1998 |
| 02 | 05 | Becky Weber | Rep. | 48 | Green Bay | 2002 |
| 02 | 06 | John Ainsworth | Rep. | 62 | Shawano | 1990 |
| 03 | 07 | Peggy Krusick | Dem. | 46 | Milwaukee | 1983 |
| 03 | 08 | Pedro Colón | Dem. | 34 | Milwaukee | 1998 |
| 03 | 09 | Josh Zepnick | Dem. | 34 | Milwaukee | 2002 |
| 04 | 10 | Annette P. Williams | Dem. | 65 | Milwaukee | 1980 |
| 04 | 11 | Johnnie E. Morris | Dem. | 51 | Milwaukee | 1992 |
| 04 | 12 | Shirley Krug | Dem. | 44 | Milwaukee | 1984 |
| 05 | 13 | David Cullen | Dem. | 42 | Milwaukee | 1990 |
| 05 | 14 | Leah Vukmir | Rep. | 44 | Wauwatosa | 2002 |
| 05 | 15 | Tony Staskunas | Dem. | 41 | West Allis | 1996 |
| 06 | 16 | Leon Young | Dem. | 35 | Milwaukee | 1992 |
| 06 | 17 | Spencer Coggs (res. Nov. 25, 2003) | Dem. | 53 | Milwaukee | 1982 |
| 06 | 17 | Barbara Toles (from Feb. 3, 2004) | Dem. | 47 | Milwaukee | 2004 |
| 06 | 18 | Antonio R. Riley (res. Feb. 1, 2003) | Dem. | 39 | Milwaukee | 1992 |
| 06 | 18 | Lena Taylor (from Apr. 30, 2003) | Dem. | 36 | Milwaukee | 2003 |
| 07 | 19 | Jon Richards | Dem. | 39 | Milwaukee | 1998 |
| 07 | 20 | Christine Sinicki | Dem. | 42 | Milwaukee | 1998 |
| 07 | 21 | Jeffrey Plale (res. May 9, 2003) | Dem. | 34 | South Milwaukee | 1996 |
| 07 | 21 | Mark Honadel (from Aug. 4, 2003) | Rep. | 46 | South Milwaukee | 2003 |
| 08 | 22 | Sheldon Wasserman | Dem. | 41 | Milwaukee | 1994 |
| 08 | 23 | Curt Gielow | Rep. | 57 | Mequon | 2002 |
| 08 | 24 | Suzanne Jeskewitz | Rep. | 60 | Menomonee Falls | 1996 |
| 09 | 25 | Bob Ziegelbauer | Dem. | 51 | Manitowoc | 1992 |
| 09 | 26 | Terry Van Akkeren | Dem. | 48 | Sheboygan | 2002 |
| 09 | 27 | Steve Kestell | Rep. | 47 | Elkhart Lake | 1998 |
| 10 | 28 | Mark Pettis | Rep. | 52 | Hertel | 1998 |
| 10 | 29 | Joe Plouff | Dem. | 52 | Menomonie | 1996 |
| 10 | 30 | Kitty Rhoades | Rep. | 51 | Hudson | 1998 |
| 11 | 31 | Stephen Nass | Rep. | 50 | Whitewater | 1990 |
| 11 | 32 | Thomas Lothian | Rep. | 74 | Williams Bay | 2002 |
| 11 | 33 | Daniel P. Vrakas | Rep. | 47 | Hartland | 1990 |
| 12 | 34 | Dan Meyer | Rep. | 54 | Eagle River | 2000 |
| 12 | 35 | Donald Friske | Rep. | 41 | Merrill | 2000 |
| 12 | 36 | Lorraine Seratti | Rep. | 53 | Spread Eagle | 1992 |
| 13 | 37 | David Ward | Rep. | 49 | Fort Atkinson | 1992 |
| 13 | 38 | Steven Foti | Rep. | 44 | Oconomowoc | 1982 |
| 13 | 39 | Jeff Fitzgerald | Rep. | 36 | Horicon | 2000 |
| 14 | 40 | Jean Hundertmark | Rep. | 48 | Clintonville | 1998 |
| 14 | 41 | Luther Olsen | Rep. | 51 | Berlin | 1994 |
| 14 | 42 | J. A. Hines | Rep. | 75 | Oxford | 2001 |
| 15 | 43 | Debi Towns | Rep. | 46 | Janesville | 2002 |
| 15 | 44 | Wayne W. Wood | Dem. | 72 | Janesville | 1976 |
| 15 | 45 | Dan Schooff | Dem. | 31 | Beloit | 1998 |
| 16 | 46 | Tom Hebl | Dem. | 57 | Sun Prairie | 1996 |
| 16 | 47 | Eugene Hahn | Rep. | 73 | Springvale | 1990 |
| 16 | 48 | Mark F. Miller | Dem. | 59 | Madison | 1998 |
| 17 | 49 | Gabe Loeffelholz | Rep. | 62 | Platteville | 2000 |
| 17 | 50 | Sheryl Albers | Rep. | 48 | Reedsburg | 1991 |
| 17 | 51 | Stephen Freese | Rep. | 42 | Dodgeville | 1990 |
| 18 | 52 | John Townsend | Rep. | 64 | Fond du Lac | 1998 |
| 18 | 53 | Carol Owens | Rep. | 71 | Oshkosh | 1992 |
| 18 | 54 | Gregg Underheim | Rep. | 52 | Oshkosh | 1987 |
| 19 | 55 | Dean Kaufert | Rep. | 45 | Neenah | 1990 |
| 19 | 56 | Terri McCormick | Rep. | 46 | Appleton | 2000 |
| 19 | 57 | Steve Wieckert | Rep. | 48 | Appleton | 1996 |
| 20 | 58 | Glenn Grothman | Rep. | 47 | West Bend | 1993 |
| 20 | 59 | Daniel LeMahieu | Rep. | 56 | Cascade | 2002 |
| 20 | 60 | Mark Gottlieb | Rep. | 46 | Port Washington | 2002 |
| 21 | 61 | Robert L. Turner | Dem. | 55 | Racine | 1990 |
| 21 | 62 | John Lehman | Dem. | 57 | Racine | 1996 |
| 21 | 63 | Bonnie Ladwig | Rep. | 63 | Mount Pleasant | 1992 |
| 22 | 64 | James Kreuser | Dem. | 41 | Kenosha | 1993 |
| 22 | 65 | John Steinbrink | Dem. | 53 | Pleasant Prairie | 1996 |
| 22 | 66 | Samantha Kerkman | Rep. | 28 | Burlington | 2000 |
| 23 | 67 | Jeffrey Wood | Rep. | 33 | Chippewa Falls | 2002 |
| 23 | 68 | Larry Balow | Dem. | 59 | Eau Claire | 1998 |
| 23 | 69 | Scott Suder | Rep. | 34 | Abbotsford | 1998 |
| 24 | 70 | Amy Sue Vruwink | Dem. | 27 | Milladore | 2002 |
| 24 | 71 | Julie Lassa (res. May 9, 2003) | Dem. | 32 | Stevens Point | 1998 |
| 24 | 71 | Louis Molepske (from Aug. 11, 2003) | Dem. | 29 | Stevens Point | 2003 |
| 24 | 72 | Marlin Schneider | Dem. | 60 | Wisconsin Rapids | 1970 |
| 25 | 73 | Frank Boyle | Dem. | 57 | Superior | 1986 |
| 25 | 74 | Gary Sherman | Dem. | 53 | Port Wing | 1998 |
| 25 | 75 | Mary Hubler | Dem. | 53 | Rice Lake | 1984 |
| 26 | 76 | Terese Berceau | Dem. | 52 | Madison | 1998 |
| 26 | 77 | Spencer Black | Dem. | 52 | Madison | 1984 |
| 26 | 78 | Mark Pocan | Dem. | 38 | Madison | 1998 |
| 27 | 79 | Sondy Pope-Roberts | Dem. | 52 | Verona | 2002 |
| 27 | 80 | Mike Powers | Rep. | 52 | Albany | 1994 |
| 27 | 81 | David Travis | Dem. | 54 | Waunakee | 1978 |
| 28 | 82 | Jeff Stone | Rep. | 41 | Greendale | 1998 |
| 28 | 83 | Scott Gunderson | Rep. | 46 | Waterford | 1994 |
| 28 | 84 | Mark Gundrum | Rep. | 32 | New Berlin | 1998 |
| 29 | 85 | Gregory Huber | Dem. | 46 | Wausau | 1988 |
| 29 | 86 | Jerry Petrowski | Rep. | 52 | Marathon | 1998 |
| 29 | 87 | Mary Williams | Rep. | 53 | Medford | 2002 |
| 30 | 88 | Judy Krawczyk | Rep. | 63 | Green Bay | 2000 |
| 30 | 89 | John Gard | Rep. | 39 | Peshtigo | 1987 |
| 30 | 90 | Karl Van Roy | Rep. | 64 | Green Bay | 2002 |
| 31 | 91 | Barbara Gronemus | Dem. | 71 | Whitehall | 1982 |
| 31 | 92 | Terry Musser | Rep. | 55 | Black River Falls | 1984 |
| 31 | 93 | Robin Kreibich | Rep. | 43 | Eau Claire | 1992 |
| 32 | 94 | Michael Huebsch | Rep. | 38 | West Salem | 1994 |
| 32 | 95 | Jennifer Shilling | Dem. | 33 | La Crosse | 2000 |
| 32 | 96 | DuWayne Johnsrud | Rep. | 59 | Eastman | 1984 |
| 33 | 97 | Ann Nischke | Rep. | 51 | Waukesha | 2002 |
| 33 | 98 | Scott Jensen | Rep. | 42 | Waukesha | 1992 |
| 33 | 99 | Michael Lehman | Rep. | 59 | Hartford | 1988 |

== Changes from the 95th Legislature ==
The most significant structural change to the Legislature between the 95th and 96th sessions was the reapportionment and redistricting of legislative seats. The new districts were defined in the federal court decision Baumgart v. Wendelberger, from a three-judge panel of the United States District Court for the Eastern District of Wisconsin.
