= 98th Wisconsin Legislature =

Wisconsin legislative term for 2007-2008

←	97th	99th	→
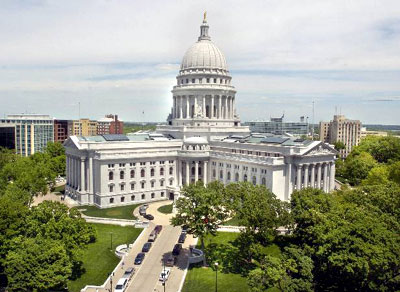
- Wisconsin State Capitol

Overview
- Legislative body: Wisconsin Legislature
- Meeting place: Wisconsin State Capitol
- Term: January 1, 2007 – January 5, 2009
- Election: November 7, 2006

Senate
- Members: 33
- Senate President: Fred Risser (D)
- President pro tempore: Tim Carpenter (D)
- Party control: Democratic

Assembly
- Members: 99
- Assembly Speaker: Michael Huebsch (R)
- Speaker pro tempore: Mark Gottlieb (R)
- Party control: Republican

Sessions
- Regular: January 3, 2007 – January 5, 2009

Special sessions
- Jan. 2007 Spec.: January 11, 2007 – February 1, 2007
- Oct. 2007 Spec.: October 15, 2007 – October 23, 2007
- Dec. 2007 Spec.: December 11, 2007 – May 14, 2008
- Mar. 2008 Spec.: March 12, 2008 – May 14, 2008
- Apr. 2008 Spec.: April 17, 2008 – May 15, 2008

The Ninety-Eighth Wisconsin Legislature convened from January 3, 2007, through January 5, 2009, in regular session, though it adjourned for legislative activity on June 11, 2008. The legislature also held five special sessions during the term.

Senators representing odd-numbered districts were newly elected for this session and were serving the first two years of a four-year term. Assembly members were elected to a two-year term. Assembly members and odd-numbered senators were elected in the general election of November 7, 2006. Senators representing even-numbered districts were serving the third and fourth year of their four-year term, having been elected in the general election held on November 2, 2004.

The governor of Wisconsin during this entire term was Democrat Jim Doyle, of Dane County, serving the first two years of his second four-year term, having won re-election in the 2006 Wisconsin gubernatorial election.

== Major events ==
- January 9, 2007: Apple Inc. CEO Steve Jobs introduced the first iPhone at a Macworld keynote in San Francisco.
- April 3, 2007: 2007 Wisconsin Spring election:
  - Annette Ziegler was elected a justice of the Wisconsin Supreme Court to succeed Jon P. Wilcox.
- April 1, 2008: 2008 Wisconsin Spring election:
  - Michael Gableman was elected a justice of the Wisconsin Supreme Court, defeating incumbent justice Louis B. Butler.
  - Wisconsin voters ratified an amendment to the state constitution putting some limits on the Governor's line-item veto powers.
- August 28, 2008: Barack Obama accepted the nomination of the Democratic Party for President of the United States, becoming the first African American presidential nominee of a major American political party.
- September 15, 2008: During the 2008 financial crisis, Lehman Brothers filed for bankruptcy—the largest bankruptcy in U.S. history.
- September 26, 2008: Washington Mutual filed for bankruptcy—the largest bank failure in U.S. history.
- September 29, 2008: The U.S. House of Representatives rejected the Emergency Economic Stabilization Act of 2008. In response, the Dow Jones Industrial Average dropped 777.68 points (6.98%)—at the time it was the largest point drop in the history of the exchange.
- October 3, 2008: U.S. President George W. Bush signed the Emergency Economic Stabilization Act of 2008, passed by the U.S. House of Representatives earlier that day.
- October 6–10, 2008: The Dow Jones Industrial Average fell 1,874.19 points, or 18.2%, on record-breaking volume.
- November 4, 2008: Barack Obama elected President of the United States.

== Major legislation ==
- February 16, 2007: An Act ... relating to: creation of a Government Accountability Board, enforcement of elections, ethics, and lobbying regulation laws, venue for prosecution of certain offenses, granting rule-making authority, making appropriations, and providing penalties (2007 Act 1). Created the Wisconsin Government Accountability Board and abolished the old state elections board and state ethics board.

== Party summary ==
=== Senate summary ===
Senate Partisan composition Democratic: 18 seats Republican: 15 seats

	Party (Shading indicates majority caucus)		Total	
	Dem.	Rep.	Total	Vacant
End of previous Legislature	14	19	33	0
Start of Reg. Session	18	15	33	0
From Jun. 4, 2008 (Note: Democrat Roger Breske (12th District) resigned to accept appointment as state commissioner of railroads.)	17	15	32	1
From Jul. 4, 2008 (Note: Republican Carol Roessler (18th District) resigned.)	17	14	31	2
Final voting share	53.13%	43.75%		
Beginning of the next Legislature	18	15	33	0

=== Assembly summary ===
Senate Partisan composition Democratic: 47 seats Republican: 52 seats

	Party (Shading indicates majority caucus)			Total	
	Dem.	Ind.	Rep.	Total	Vacant
End of previous Legislature	39	0	60	99	0
Start of Reg. Session	47	0	52	99	0
From Jul. 8, 2008 (Note: Republican Jeffrey Wood (67th District) changed his party affiliation to Independent.)	47	1	51	99	0
Final voting share	47.47%	1.01%	51.52%		
Beginning of the next Legislature	52	1	46	99	0

== Sessions ==
- Regular session: January 3, 2007 – January 5, 2009
- January 2007 special session: January 11, 2007 – February 1, 2007
- October 2007 special session: October 15, 2007 – October 23, 2007
- December 2007 special session: December 11, 2007 – May 14, 2008
- March 2008 special session: March 12, 2008 – May 14, 2008
- April 2008 special session: April 17, 2008 – May 15, 2008

== Leadership ==
=== Senate leadership ===
- President: Fred Risser (D–Madison)
- President pro tempore: Tim Carpenter (D–Milwaukee)

==== Majority leadership ====
- Majority Leader: Judy Robson (D–Beloit) (until Oct. 24, 2007)
  - Russ Decker (D–Weston) (after Oct. 24, 2007)
- Assistant Majority Leader: Dave Hansen (D–Green Bay)
- Majority Caucus Chair: Mark Miller (D–Monona)
- Majority Caucus Vice Chair: Jeffrey Plale (D–South Milwaukee)
- Majority Caucus Secretary: Jim Sullivan (D–Wauwatosa)
- Majority Caucus Sergeant-at-Arms: Spencer Coggs (D–Milwaukee)

==== Minority leadership ====
- Minority Leader: Scott L. Fitzgerald (R–Juneau)
- Assistant Minority Leader: Joe Leibham (R–Sheboygan)
- Minority Caucus Chair: Glenn Grothman (R–West Bend)
- Minority Caucus Vice Chair: Carol Roessler (R–Oshkosh)

=== Assembly leadership ===
- Speaker of the Assembly: Michael Huebsch (R–West Salem)
- Speaker pro tempore: Mark Gottlieb (R–Port Washington)

==== Majority leadership ====
- Majority Leader: Jeff Fitzgerald (R–Horicon)
- Assistant Majority Leader: Mark Gundrum (R–New Berlin)
- Majority Caucus Chair: Mark Honadel (R–South Milwaukee)
- Majority Caucus Vice Chair: Patricia Strachota (R–West Bend)
- Majority Caucus Secretary: Mary Williams (R–Medford)
- Majority Caucus Sergeant-at-Arms: Jerry Petrowski (R–Marathon)

==== Minority leadership ====
- Minority Leader: James Kreuser (D–Kenosha)
- Assistant Minority Leader: Jon Richards (D–Milwaukee)
- Minority Caucus Chair: Tony Staskunas (D–West Allis)
- Minority Caucus Vice Chair: Tamara Grigsby (D–Milwaukee)
- Minority Caucus Secretary: Donna J. Seidel (D–Wausau)
- Minority Caucus Sergeant-at-Arms: Ann Hraychuck (D–Balsam Lake)

== Members ==
=== Members of the Senate ===
Members of the Wisconsin Senate for the Ninety-Eighth Wisconsin Legislature:

Senate partisan representation Democratic: 18 seats Republican: 15 seats

Dist.	Senator	Party	Age (2007)	Home	First elected
01	Alan Lasee	Rep.	69	De Pere, Brown County	1977
02	Robert Cowles	Rep.	56	Green Bay, Brown County	1987
03	Tim Carpenter	Dem.	46	Milwaukee, Milwaukee County	2002
04	Lena Taylor	Dem.	40	Milwaukee, Milwaukee County	2004
05	Jim Sullivan	Dem.	39	Wauwatosa, Milwaukee County	2006
06	Spencer Coggs	Dem.	57	Milwaukee, Milwaukee County	2003
07	Jeffrey Plale	Dem.	38	South Milwaukee, Milwaukee County	2003
08	Alberta Darling	Rep.	62	River Hills, Milwaukee County	1992
09	Joe Leibham	Rep.	37	Sheboygan, Sheboygan County	2002
10	Sheila Harsdorf	Rep.	50	River Falls, Pierce County	2000
11	Neal Kedzie	Rep.	50	Elkhorn, Walworth County	2002
12	Roger Breske (res. Jun. 4, 2008)	Dem.	68	Eland, Shawano County	1990
12	--Vacant from Jun. 4, 2008--				
13	Scott L. Fitzgerald	Rep.	43	Juneau, Dodge County	1994
14	Luther Olsen	Rep.	55	Ripon, Fond du Lac County	2004
15	Judy Robson	Dem.	68	Beloit, Rock County	1998
16	Mark Miller	Dem.	63	Monona, Dane County	2004
17	Dale Schultz	Rep.	53	Richland Center, Richland County	1991
18	Carol Roessler (res. Jul. 4, 2008)	Rep.	58	Oshkosh, Winnebago County	1987
18	--Vacant from Jul. 4, 2008--				
19	Michael G. Ellis	Rep.	65	Neenah, Winnebago County	1982
20	Glenn Grothman	Rep.	51	West Bend, Washington County	2004
21	John W. Lehman	Dem.	61	Racine, Racine County	2006
22	Robert Wirch	Dem.	63	Pleasant Prairie, Kenosha County	1996
23	Pat Kreitlow	Dem.	42	Chippewa Falls, Chippewa County	2006
24	Julie Lassa	Dem.	36	Stevens Point, Portage County	2003
25	Robert Jauch	Dem.	61	Poplar, Douglas County	1986
26	Fred Risser	Dem.	79	Madison, Dane County	1962
27	Jon Erpenbach	Dem.	45	Middleton, Dane County	1998
28	Mary Lazich	Rep.	54	New Berlin, Waukesha County	1998
29	Russ Decker	Dem.	53	Schofield, Marathon County	1990
30	Dave Hansen	Dem.	59	Green Bay, Brown County	2000
31	Kathleen Vinehout	Dem.	48	Alma, Buffalo County	2006
32	Dan Kapanke	Rep.	59	La Crosse, La Crosse County	2004
33	Theodore Kanavas	Rep.	45	Brookfield, Waukesha County	2001

=== Members of the Assembly ===
Members of the Assembly for the Ninety-Eighth Wisconsin Legislature:

Assembly partisan representation Democratic: 47 seats Republican: 52 seats

Senate District	Assembly District	Representative	Party	Age (2007)	Home	First Elected
01	01	Garey Bies	Rep.	60	Sister Bay	2000
01	02	Frank Lasee	Rep.	45	Bellevue	1994
01	03	Alvin Ott	Rep.	57	Forest Junction	1986
02	04	Phil Montgomery	Rep.	49	Green Bay	1998
02	05	Tom Nelson	Dem.	30	Kaukauna	2004
02	06	Gary Tauchen	Rep.	53	Bonduel	2006
03	07	Peggy Krusick	Dem.	50	Milwaukee	1983
03	08	Pedro Colón	Dem.	38	Milwaukee	1998
03	09	Josh Zepnick	Dem.	38	Milwaukee	2002
04	10	Annette Polly Williams	Dem.	69	Milwaukee	1980
04	11	Jason Fields	Dem.	32	Milwaukee	2004
04	12	Fred Kessler	Dem.	66	Milwaukee	1960
05	13	David Cullen	Dem.	46	Milwaukee	1990
05	14	Leah Vukmir	Rep.	48	Wauwatosa	2002
05	15	Tony Staskunas	Dem.	45	West Allis	1996
06	16	Leon Young	Dem.	39	Milwaukee	1992
06	17	Barbara Toles	Dem.	50	Milwaukee	2004
06	18	Tamara Grigsby	Dem.	32	Milwaukee	2004
07	19	Jon Richards	Dem.	43	Milwaukee	1998
07	20	Christine Sinicki	Dem.	46	Milwaukee	1998
07	21	Mark Honadel	Rep.	50	South Milwaukee	2003
08	22	Sheldon Wasserman	Dem.	45	Milwaukee	1994
08	23	Jim Ott	Rep.	59	Mequon	2006
08	24	Suzanne Jeskewitz	Rep.	64	Menomonee Falls	1996
09	25	Bob Ziegelbauer	Dem.	55	Manitowoc	1992
09	26	Terry Van Akkeren	Dem.	52	Sheboygan	2002
09	27	Steve Kestell	Rep.	51	Elkhart Lake	1998
10	28	Ann Hraychuck	Dem.	55	Balsam Lake	2006
10	29	John Murtha	Rep.	55	Baldwin	2006
10	30	Kitty Rhoades	Rep.	55	Hudson	1998
11	31	Stephen Nass	Rep.	54	La Grange	1990
11	32	Thomas Lothian	Rep.	78	Williams Bay	2002
11	33	Scott Newcomer	Rep.	41	Pewaukee	2006
12	34	Dan Meyer	Rep.	58	Eagle River	2000
12	35	Donald Friske	Rep.	45	Merrill	2000
12	36	Jeffrey Mursau	Rep.	52	Crivitz	2004
13	37	Andy Jorgensen	Dem.	39	Fort Atkinson	2004
13	38	Joel Kleefisch	Rep.	35	Oconomowoc	2004
13	39	Jeff Fitzgerald	Rep.	40	Horicon	2000
14	40	Kevin David Petersen	Rep.	42	Waupaca	2006
14	41	Joan Ballweg	Rep.	54	Markesan	2004
14	42	J. A. Hines	Rep.	79	Oxford	2001
15	43	Kim Hixson	Dem.	49	Whitewater	2006
15	44	Michael J. Sheridan	Dem.	48	Janesville	2004
15	45	Chuck Benedict	Dem.	60	Beloit	2004
16	46	Gary Hebl	Dem.	55	Sun Prairie	2004
16	47	Eugene Hahn	Rep.	77	Cambria	1990
16	48	Joe Parisi	Dem.	46	Madison	2004
17	49	Phil Garthwaite	Dem.	34	Fennimore	2006
17	50	Sheryl Albers	Rep.	52	Reedsburg	1991
17	51	Steve Hilgenberg	Dem.	62	Dodgeville	2006
18	52	John Townsend	Rep.	68	Fond du Lac	1998
18	53	Carol Owens	Rep.	75	Oshkosh	1992
18	54	Gordon Hintz	Dem.	34	Oshkosh	2006
19	55	Dean Kaufert	Rep.	49	Neenah	1990
19	56	Roger Roth	Rep.	28	Appleton	2006
19	57	Steve Wieckert	Rep.	28	Appleton	1996
20	58	Patricia Strachota	Rep.	51	West Bend	2004
20	59	Daniel LeMahieu	Rep.	60	Cascade	2002
20	60	Mark Gottlieb	Rep.	50	Port Washington	2002
21	61	Robert L. Turner	Dem.	59	Racine	1990
21	62	Cory Mason	Dem.	33	Racine	2006
21	63	Robin Vos	Rep.	38	Caledonia	2004
22	64	James Kreuser	Dem.	45	Kenosha	1993
22	65	John Steinbrink	Dem.	57	Pleasant Prairie	1996
22	66	Samantha Kerkman	Rep.	32	Randall	2000
23	67	Jeffrey Wood	Rep.	37	Chippewa Falls	2002
23	68	Terry Moulton	Rep.	60	Eau Claire	2004
23	69	Scott Suder	Rep.	38	Abbotsford	1998
24	70	Amy Sue Vruwink	Dem.	31	Milladore	2002
24	71	Louis Molepske	Dem.	32	Stevens Point	2003
24	72	Marlin Schneider	Dem.	64	Wisconsin Rapids	1970
25	73	Frank Boyle	Dem.	61	Superior	1986
25	74	Gary Sherman	Dem.	57	Port Wing	1998
25	75	Mary Hubler	Dem.	54	Rice Lake	1984
26	76	Terese Berceau	Dem.	56	Madison	1998
26	77	Spencer Black	Dem.	56	Madison	1984
26	78	Mark Pocan	Dem.	42	Madison	1998
27	79	Sondy Pope-Roberts	Dem.	56	Verona	2002
27	80	Brett Davis	Rep.	31	Oregon	2004
27	81	David Travis	Dem.	58	Waunakee	1978
28	82	Jeff Stone	Rep.	45	Greendale	1978
28	83	Scott Gunderson	Rep.	50	Waterford	1994
28	84	Mark Gundrum	Rep.	36	New Berlin	1998
29	85	Donna Seidel	Dem.	56	Wausau	2004
29	86	Jerry Petrowski	Rep.	56	Marathon	1998
29	87	Mary Williams	Rep.	57	Medford	2002
30	88	James Soletski	Dem.	58	Green Bay	2006
30	89	John Nygren	Rep.	42	Marinette	2006
30	90	Karl Van Roy	Rep.	68	Green Bay	2002
31	91	Barbara Gronemus	Dem.	75	Whitehall	1982
31	92	Terry Musser	Rep.	59	Black River Falls	1984
31	93	Jeff Smith	Dem.	51	Eau Claire	2006
32	94	Michael Huebsch	Rep.	42	West Salem	1994
32	95	Jennifer Shilling	Dem.	37	La Crosse	2000
32	96	Lee Nerison	Rep.	54	Westby	2004
33	97	Bill Kramer	Rep.	41	Waukesha	2006
33	98	Rich Zipperer	Rep.	32	Pewaukee	2006
33	99	Don Pridemore	Rep.	60	Hartford	2004
