= Spanbauer =

Spanbauer is a surname. Notable people with the surname include:

- Richard Spanbauer (born 1946), American politician
- Tom Spanbauer (1946–2024), American writer
