= Mark Radcliffe (politician) =

American politician

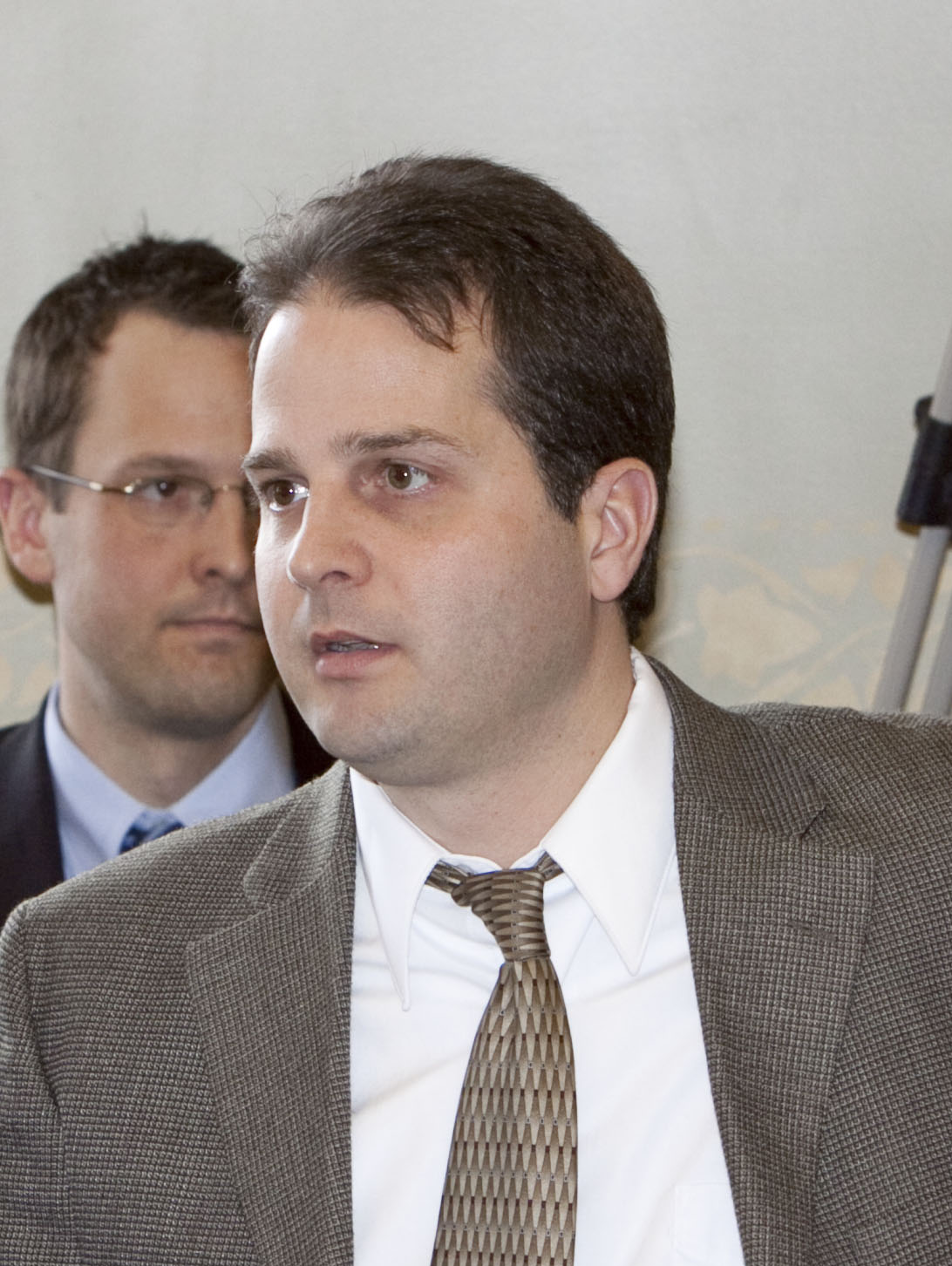
- Radcliffe in 2009

Member of the Wisconsin State Assembly from the 92nd district
- In office January 5, 2009 – January 7, 2013
- Preceded by: Terry Musser
- Succeeded by: Chris Danou

Personal details
- Born: June 20, 1971 (age 55) Madison, Wisconsin
- Party: Democratic
- Spouse: Becky
- Education: University of Wisconsin, Stevens Point, Hamline Law School
- Occupation: attorney

Mark A. Radcliffe (born June 20, 1971) is an American Democratic politician and lawyer. Radcliffe served in the Wisconsin State Assembly, representing the 92nd Assembly District from his election in 2008 until 2013, when his final term ended.

== Biography ==
Born in Madison, Wisconsin, Radcliffe graduated from Black River Falls High School. Radcliffe received his bachelor's degree from University of Wisconsin–Stevens Point and his J.D. degree from Hamline University Law School.

In April 2012, Radcliffe announced he would not seek reelection to the Wisconsin State Assembly.

He has been village attorney in Alma Center, Wisconsin, since 1999.
