= Richard Spanbauer =

Wisconsin politician, legislator, and businessman

Member of the Wisconsin State Assembly from the 53rd district
- In office January 5, 2009 – January 7, 2013
- Preceded by: Carol Owens
- Succeeded by: Michael Schraa

Personal details
- Born: March 5, 1946 (age 80) New York, New York
- Party: Republican
- Education: Fox Valley Technical College
- Profession: Politician, Businessman

Richard Spanbauer (March 5, 1946) is a Wisconsin politician, legislator, and businessman.

Born in New York City, Spanbauer graduated from Oshkosh High School in 1963 and served in the United States Marine Corps reserve from 1963 to 1969. Spanbauer went to Fox Valley Technical College and is a manufacturer and retailer in Oshkosh, Wisconsin. Spanbauer served as chairman of the Algoma Town Board from 2001 to 2009. He served in the Wisconsin Assembly from January 2009 until he retired in January 2013.
