= Kim Hixson =

American politician and Educator

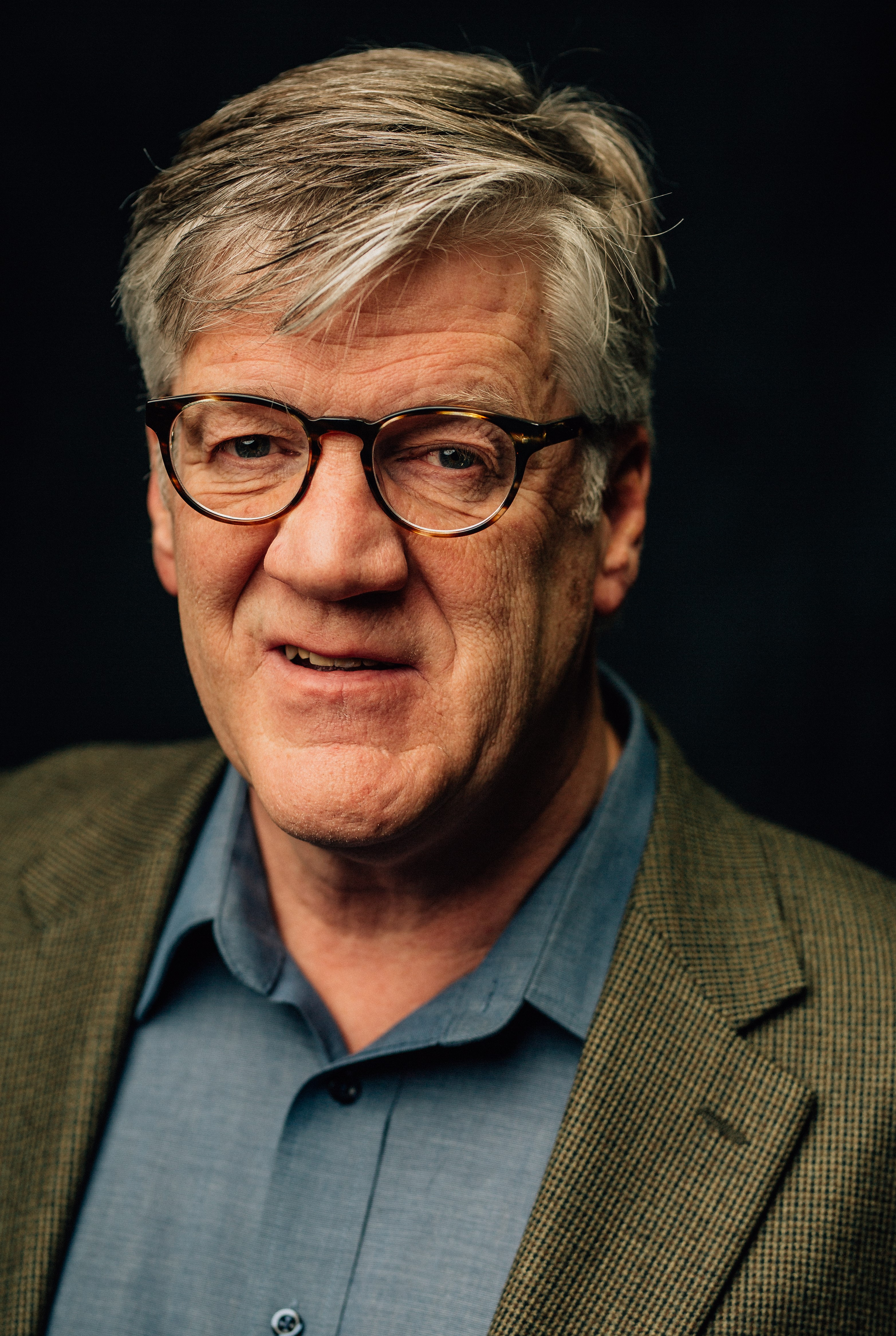

Member of the Wisconsin State Assembly from the 43rd district
- In office January 1, 2007 – January 3, 2011
- Preceded by: Debi Towns
- Succeeded by: Evan Wynn

Personal details
- Born: July 26, 1957 (age 69) Chattanooga, Tennessee, U.S.
- Party: Democratic
- Education: Chattanooga State Technical Community College (A.A.); University of Tennessee at Chattanooga (B.A., M.A.); Southern Illinois University (Ph.D.)

Thomas Kim Hixson (born July 26, 1957) is an American educator and former politician. He is the former dean of the College of Liberal Arts & Sciences at Frostburg State University. He previously served four years as a member of the Wisconsin State Assembly, representing Whitewater and Rock County as a Democrat (2007–2011).

== Biography ==
Hixson received an A.A. in Broadcasting at Chattanooga State Technical Community College, a B.A. in Advertising and English and a M.A. in Professional Writing from the University of Tennessee at Chattanooga, and a Ph.D. in Journalism from Southern Illinois University.

He is married, with a son and two daughters. Prior to his election to the Assembly, he was a professor of Advertising at the University of Wisconsin-Whitewater. He also served on the City of Whitewater Common Council and served as Council President.

In the Assembly, he chaired the Colleges and Universities Committee and served on the Education, Financial Institutions, Work Force Development, and Consumer Protection committees. He previously served on the Committees on Aging and Long Term Care and Rural Economic Development.

In 2010, he lost his re-election bid to republican nominee Evan Wynn.

Hixson returned to the University of Wisconsin–Whitewater after his legislative service. He served as chairperson of the Communication Department before relocating to Utah State University to serve as Department Head of Journalism and Communication in July 2016.

After 3 years at Utah State University, Hixson moved to Frostburg State University to serve as dean of Liberal Arts and Sciences in 2019. He stepped down in June 2022, though still teaches classes there as of 2023.

He has appeared in several motion pictures, most recently Public Enemies and Mr. 3000.
