= Ann Hraychuck =

American politician (1951–2021)

Member of the Wisconsin State Assembly from the 28th district
- In office January 2, 2007 – January 3, 2011
- Preceded by: Mark Pettis
- Succeeded by: Erik Severson

Personal details
- Born: Ann Marie Hoehne; July 24, 1951 Amery, Wisconsin
- Died: June 6, 2021 (aged 69) Ashley, North Dakota
- Party: Democratic
- Spouse: David N. Hraychuck (m. 1999)
- Website: www.annforassembly.com

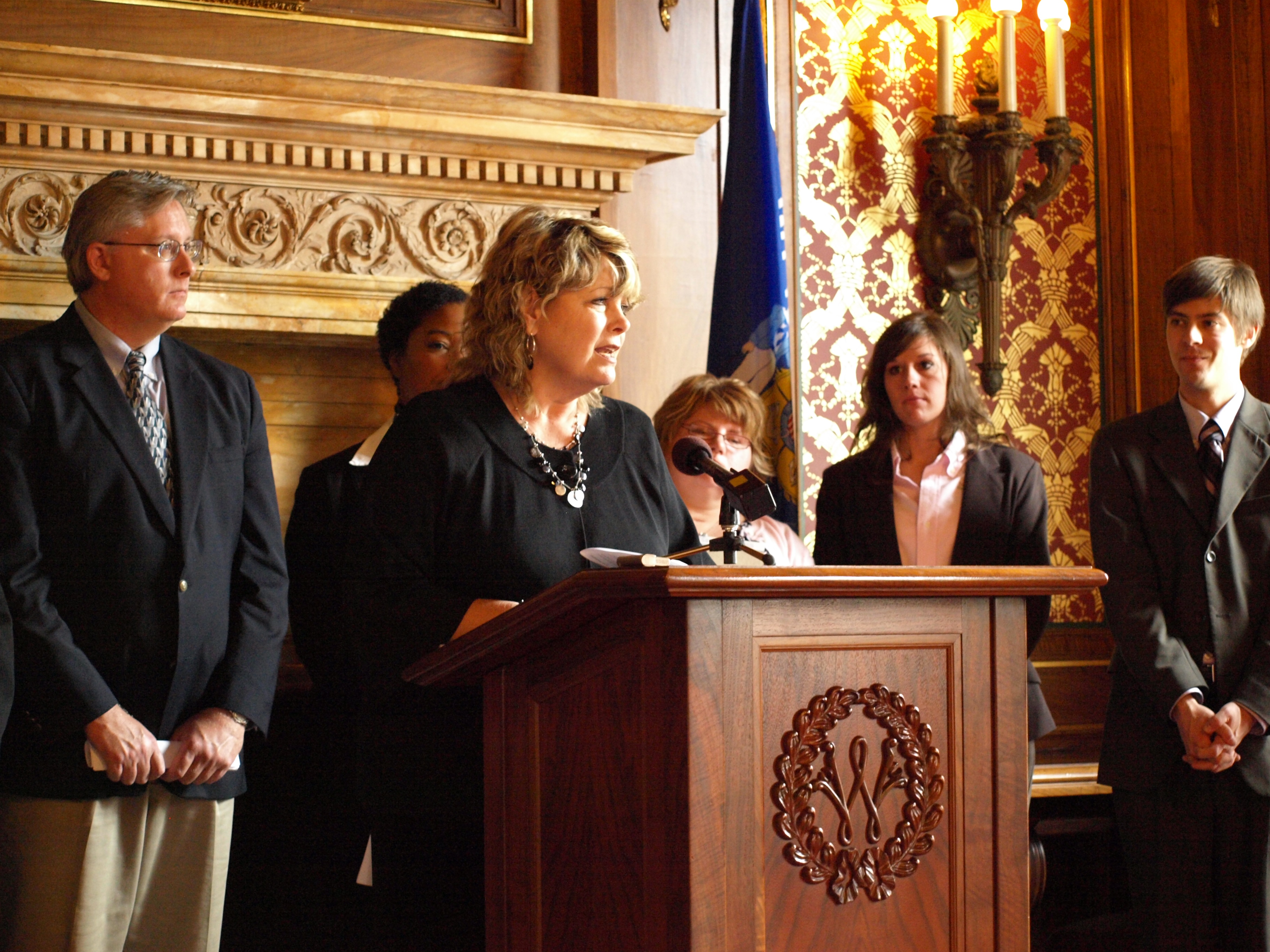

Ann Marie Hraychuck (July 24, 1951 – June 6, 2021) was an American politician who served as a Democratic Party member of the Wisconsin State Assembly, from Balsam Lake, Wisconsin representing the 28th Assembly District from her 2006 election until 2010. She served as Majority Caucus Secretary. She was defeated in 2010 by Erik Severson.

She died of cancer on June 6, 2021, in Ashley, North Dakota, at age 69.
