= Ann Nischke =

American politician

Ann Nischke (born January 19, 1951) is an American Republican politician from Wisconsin.

Born in Milwaukee, Nischke graduated from University of Wisconsin–Eau Claire in 1977. Nischke was elected to the Wisconsin State Assembly and served until 2007.
