= Stettin, Wisconsin =

Town of Stettin
- Town
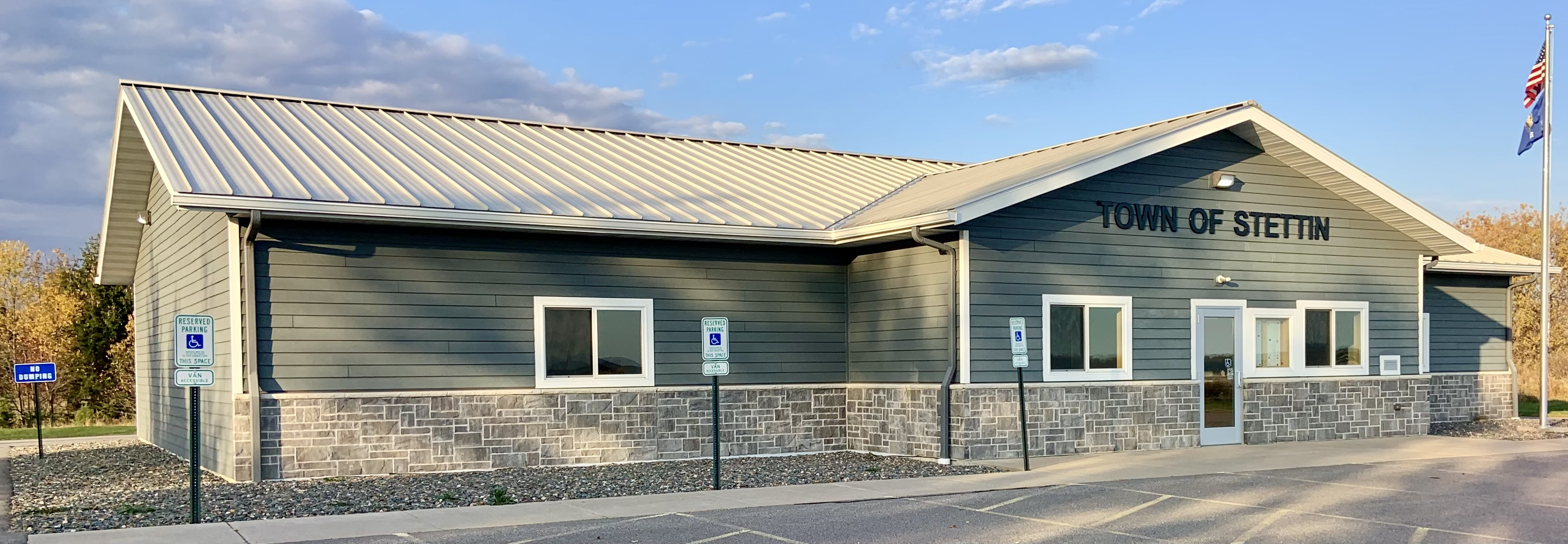
- Town hall

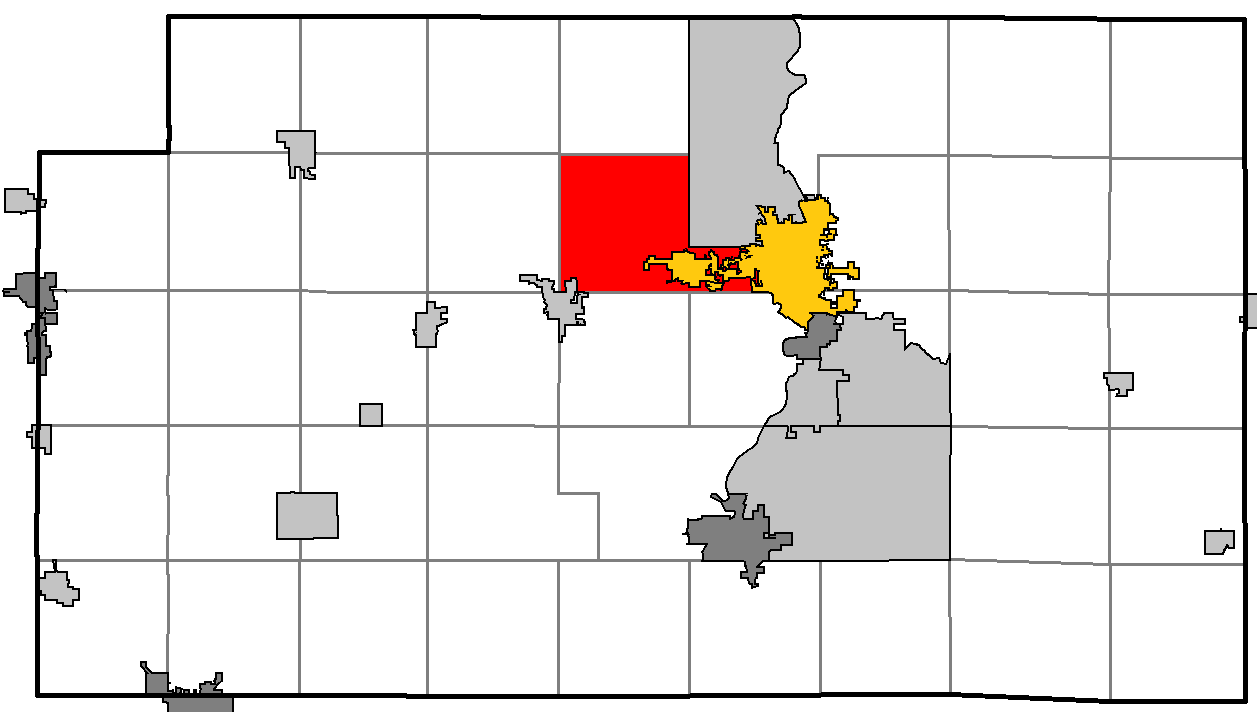
- Location of the Town of Stettin, Marathon County

- Location of Marathon County, Wisconsin
- Coordinates: 44°57′51″N 89°43′48″W
- Country: United States
- State: Wisconsin
- County: Marathon

Area
  - Total: 36.6 sq mi (94.7 km^{2})
  - Land: 36.4 sq mi (94.2 km^{2})
  - Water: 0.19 sq mi (0.5 km^{2})
- Elevation: 1,352 ft (412 m)

Population (2020)
  - Total: 2,580
  - Density: 70.9/sq mi (27.4/km^{2})
- Time zone: UTC-6 (Central (CST))
  - Summer (DST): UTC-5 (CDT)
- Area codes: 715 & 534
- FIPS code: 55-77150
- GNIS feature ID: 1584221
- Website: townofstettin.org

Stettin is a town in Marathon County, Wisconsin, United States. It is part of the Wausau, Wisconsin Metropolitan Statistical Area. The population was 2,554 at the 2010 census, and was 2580 in the 2020 census. The unincorporated community of Mount View is partially located in the town.

== Geography ==
According to the United States Census Bureau, the town has a total area of 36.6 square miles (94.7 km^{2}), of which 36.4 square miles (94.2 km^{2}) is land and 0.19 square miles (0.5 km^{2}), or 0.52%, is water.

== Demographics ==
As of the census of 2000, there were 2,191 people, 805 households, and 653 families living in the town. The population density was 58.9 people per square mile (22.7/km^{2}). There were 828 housing units at an average density of 22.2 per square mile (8.6/km^{2}). The racial makeup of the town was 96.76% White, 0.23% African American, 0.18% Native American, 2.19% Asian, 0.37% from other races, and 0.27% from two or more races. Hispanic or Latino of any race were 0.64% of the population.

There were 805 households, out of which 33.7% had children under the age of 18 living with them, 73.9% were married couples living together, 4.7% had a female householder with no husband present, and 18.8% were non-families. 14.7% of all households were made up of individuals, and 6.8% had someone living alone who was 65 years of age or older. The average household size was 2.72 and the average family size was 3.01.

The town's population distribution was 24.7% under the age of 18, 7.3% from 18 to 24, 26.0% from 25 to 44, 30.1% from 45 to 64, and 11.9% who were 65 years of age or older. The median age was 40 years. For every 100 females, there were 107.7 males. For every 100 females age 18 and over, there were 103.6 males.

The median income for a household in the town was $60,221, and the median income for a family was $64,803. Males had a median income of $41,141 versus $31,026 for females. The per capita income for the town was $26,269. About 0.6% of families and 1.6% of the population were below the poverty line, including none of those under the age of eighteen or sixty-five or over.
