= Steve Hilgenberg =

American politician (1944–2011)

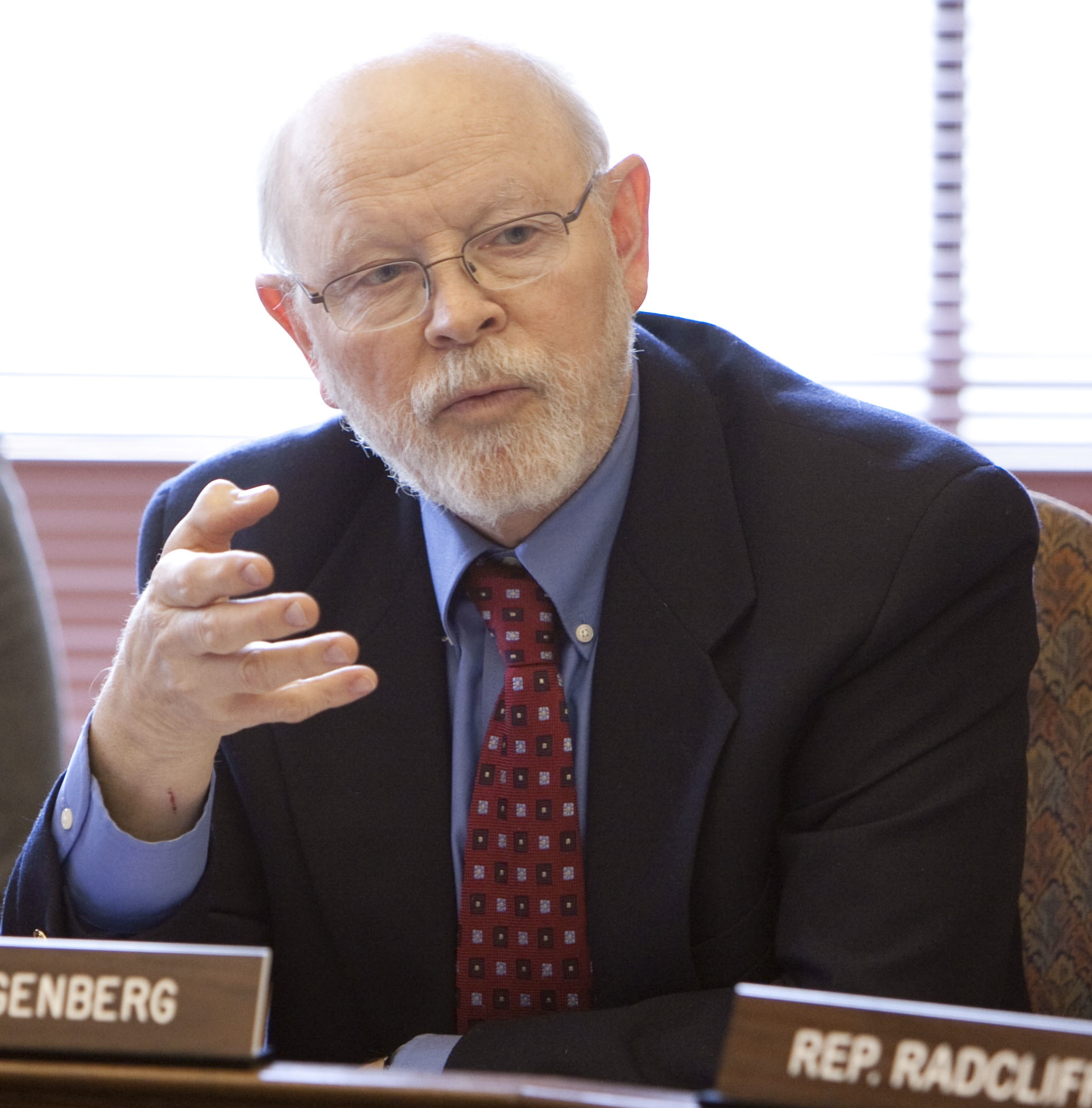
- Hilgenberg in 2009

Member of the Wisconsin State Assembly from the 51st district
- In office January 1, 2007 – January 3, 2011
- Preceded by: Stephen Freese
- Succeeded by: Howard Marklein

Personal details
- Born: November 26, 1944 Appleton, Wisconsin
- Died: March 27, 2011 (aged 66) Dodgeville, Wisconsin
- Party: Democratic
- Spouse: Mary Mayo
- Education: Madison Area Technical College
- Profession: Printer, small business owner

Steve Hilgenberg (November 26, 1944 – March 27, 2011) was an American politician. He was a Democratic member of the Wisconsin State Assembly, representing the 51st Assembly District 2007–2011. He was a member of the Committees on Insurance, Rural Economic Development, and Small Business.

Hilgenberg attended the University of Wisconsin and Madison Area Technical College. He served in the United States Army from 1966 to 1969 during the Vietnam War. He was the former owner and operator of a commercial printing business and a former member of the Dodgeville School Board.

In 2010, Hilgenberg announced he would not seek re-election due to health concerns.

He died of prostate cancer on March 27, 2011.
