= Debi Towns =

American politician

Debi Towns (born February 12, 1956) is an American Republican politician from Wisconsin.

Born in Sycamore, Illinois, Towns received her master's degree from the University of Wisconsin–Whitewater and her doctorate from Cardinal Stritch University in Milwaukee. Towns served in the Wisconsin State Assembly from 2003 to 2007, and was defeated for reelection in 2006.
