= Mark Pettis =

American politician

Mark Pettis (born December 18, 1950) is an American Republican politician from Wisconsin.

== Life and career ==
Born in Osceola, Wisconsin, Pettis served in the United States Navy. After military service, He worked in business and sales and lived in the La Follette. He served on the Burnett County, Wisconsin Board of Supervisors. Pettis began serving in the Wisconsin State Assembly in 1997 and served until his defeat in 2006.
