= Chuck Benedict =

American politician

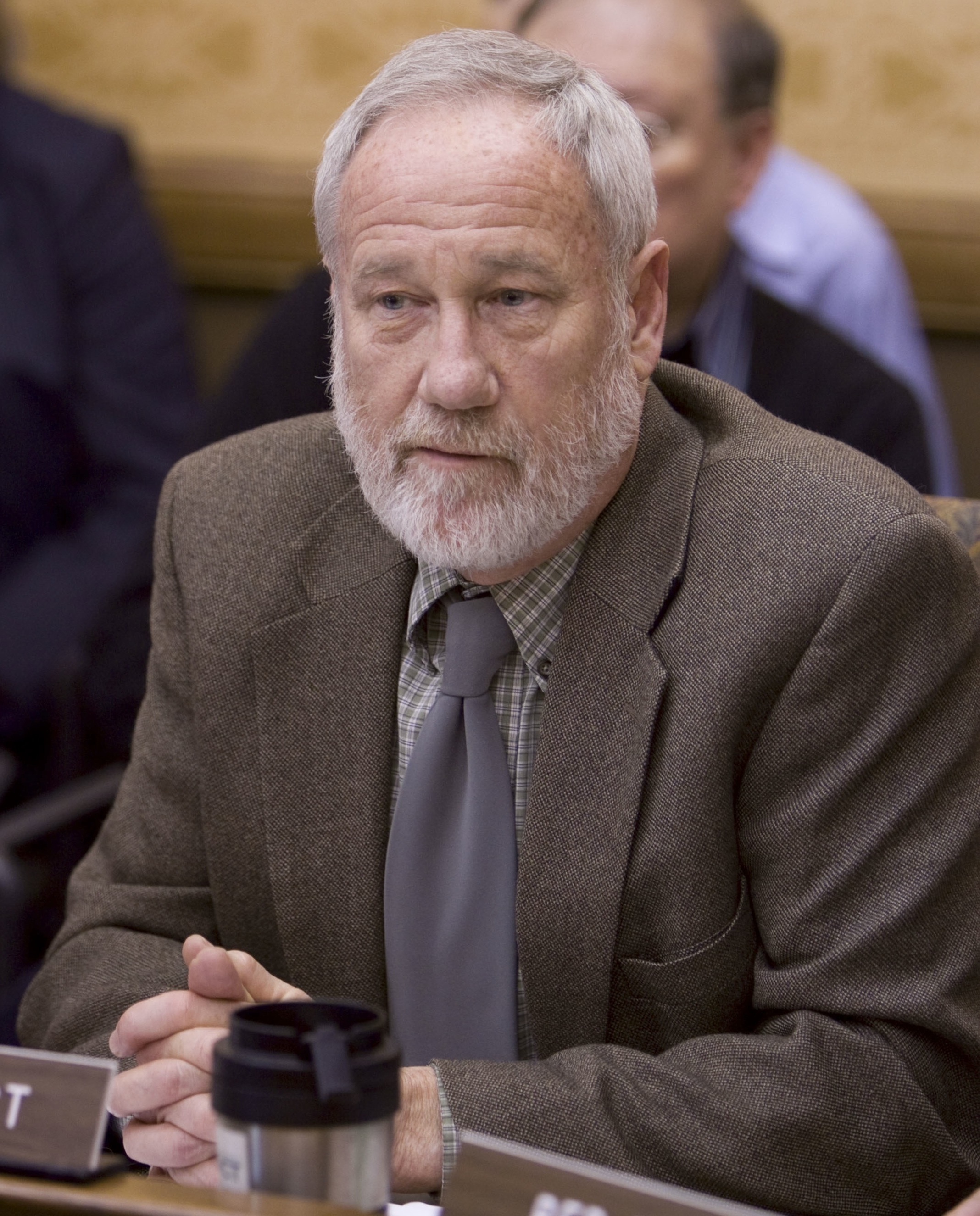
- Benedict in 2009

Member of the Wisconsin State Assembly from the 45th district
- In office January 3, 2005 – January 3, 2011
- Preceded by: Dan Schooff
- Succeeded by: Amy Loudenbeck

Personal details
- Born: August 13, 1946 (age 80) Norwalk, Connecticut
- Party: Democratic
- Education: Dartmouth College (AB); Princeton University (MA); University of Connecticut (MD)
- Profession: neurologist, educator

Charles P. "Chuck" Benedict (born 13 August 1946) is a former physician, educator and Democratic politician who served as a member of the Wisconsin State Assembly, representing the 45th Assembly District from 2005 until 2010.

In April 2010, Benedict announced he would not seek reelection.

== Education ==
In 1968, Benedict received his AB from Dartmouth College and in 1970 he received his MA from Princeton University. Nine years later he received his MD in 1979 from the University of Connecticut. Benedict also attended Duke University.

== Professional experience ==
Benedict was also a high school math and science teacher and a neurologist.

== Political experience ==
From 2004-2010 Benedict was an assembly member for Wisconsin State Assembly.
