= John Townsend (Wisconsin politician) =

American politician and legislator

John Townsend (born May 23, 1938) is a Wisconsin politician and legislator.

Born in St. Louis, Missouri, Townsend graduated from Wayne State University. He served on the Fond du Lac, Wisconsin Common Council. Townsend was elected to the Wisconsin State Assembly in 1999. In October 2009, Townsend announced his retirement from politics, confirming that he would not seek re-election.
