= Steve Wieckert =

American politician, legislator, and realtor

Steve Wieckert (October 26, 1954) is a Wisconsin politician, legislator, and realtor.

Born in Appleton, Wisconsin, Wieckert graduated from Appleton West High School and received his bachelors and masters from American University. Wieckert, who is a realtor, served in the Wisconsin State Assembly from 1997 until 2009.
