= Thomas Lothian =

American politician

Member of the Wisconsin State Assembly from the 32nd district
- In office 2003–2011
- Succeeded by: Tyler August

Personal details
- Born: December 14, 1928 Cleveland Heights, Ohio
- Died: May 14, 2015 (aged 86) Milwaukee, Wisconsin
- Party: Republican
- Education: Ohio State University
- Profession: Politician

Thomas Archer Lothian (December 14, 1928 – May 14, 2015) was a Wisconsin politician, legislator, and college professor.

== Early life and education ==
Born in Cleveland Heights, Ohio, Lothian was a son of John James and Catherine (née Rogers). After graduation from Cleveland Heights High School, he attended Ohio State University where received his B.A. in 1953. He also received M.A. in chemistry from the Illinois Institute of Technology.

== Career ==
Lothian was a college professor at the University of Illinois at Chicago. Lothian served as Williams Bay, Wisconsin, village trustee from 1974 to 1982 and on the Walworth County, Wisconsin Board of Supervisors from 1992 to 2003. Lothian then served in the Wisconsin State Assembly, from 2003 to 2011, for eight years and was a Republican. In March 2010, Lothian announced his retirement. He was succeeded by Rep. Tyler August. Lothian died on May 14, 2015, aged 86.

== Personal life ==
Outside of his political and professorship careers, Lothian was a past president of the Wisconsin Counties Association and the Lions Club. He was a member of many philanthropic organizations, including the Medinah Shriners and the Williams Bay Lions Club. Lothian was a Mason and was a member of the Scottish Rite of the Masons and former Master of the Glenview Masonic Lodge. He was a member and commodore of the Lake Geneva Yacht Club and served on the Board of Directors at the Geneva Lake Sailing School. As a Christian, Lothian was a member and deacon of the United Church of Christ in Williams Bay, Wisconsin.

Lothian married Carol Ann (née Vichek) Lothian on April 20, 1957, in Bedford, Ohio, and have two sons.
