= Mary Williams (Wisconsin politician) =

American politician and legislator

Member of the Wisconsin State Assembly from the 87th district
- In office January 6, 2003 – January 5, 2015
- Preceded by: Martin L. Reynolds
- Succeeded by: James W. Edming

Personal details
- Born: July 8, 1949 (age 77) Phillips, Wisconsin
- Party: Republican
- Education: UWSP
- Profession: Politician
- Website: Official website

Mary Williams (born July 8, 1949) is a Wisconsin politician and legislator.

Born in Phillips, Wisconsin, Williams graduated from University of Wisconsin–Stevens Point. Williams served in the Wisconsin State Assembly since 2003. Williams and her husband owned Cougar Enterprises, which operates fast food restaurants in Medford, Wisconsin and the surrounding area. They have sold their restaurant properties.

She was appointed to the Wisconsin state technical college system board by Scott Walker. When her term expired in May 2021, she refused to leave the board while continuing to vote and make motions.
