= Donald Friske =

American politician (born 1961)

Member of the Wisconsin State Assembly from the 35th district
- In office January 3, 2001 – January 2, 2011
- Preceded by: Sarah Waukau
- Succeeded by: Tom Tiffany

Personal details
- Born: November 9, 1961 (age 64) Tomahawk, Wisconsin, U.S.
- Party: Republican
- Children: 3

Military service
- Branch/service: United States Army
- Years of service: 1979–1985

Donald Friske (born November 9, 1961) is an American politician and businessman who served as a member of the Wisconsin State Assembly from 2001 to 2011.

== Early life and education ==
Born in Tomahawk, Wisconsin, Friske graduated from the Tomahawk High School and served in the United States Army from 1979 to 1985.

== Career ==
Friske served in the Wisconsin State Assembly from January 3, 2001, through January 2, 2011. In March 2010, Friske announced his retirement from the State Assembly, and was succeeded by Tom Tiffany. Friske now operates Carquest AutoParts franchises in Merrill and Tomahawk, Wisconsin. He had previously worked as a deputy sheriff.

Friske also served as Assistant Deputy Secretary of the Wisconsin Department of Corrections.

== Personal life ==
He lives in Merrill, Wisconsin. Friske is married and has three children.
