= Karl Van Roy =

American politician and legislator (1938–2022)

Member of the Wisconsin State Assembly from the 90th district
- In office January 5, 2003 – January 7, 2013
- Preceded by: John Joseph Ryba
- Succeeded by: Eric Genrich

Personal details
- Born: December 1, 1938 Green Bay, Wisconsin, U.S.
- Died: May 10, 2022 (aged 83) Rockland, Brown County, Wisconsin, U.S.
- Party: Republican
- Education: St. Norbert College
- Profession: Politician

Karl Van Roy (December 1, 1938 – May 10, 2022) was an American politician in the state of Wisconsin.

Born in Green Bay, Wisconsin, Van Roy graduated from St. Norbert College. He served in the United States Army from 1962 to 1964. Van Roy served in the Wisconsin State Assembly from 2003 until his retirement in 2013. Van Roy died on May 10, 2022, at the age of 83.
