= Suzanne Jeskewitz =

American legislator and politician

Suzanne Jeskewitz (born February 21, 1942) is a former Wisconsin legislator and politician.

Born in Galesville, Wisconsin, Jeskewitz graduated from Gale-Ettrick High School and then received her bachelor's degree from University of Wisconsin–La Crosse. She was in public relations, teaching, and a real estate broker. Jeskewitz served on the Waukesha County, Wisconsin Board of Supervisors from 1992 to 1996. She was then elected to the Wisconsin State Assembly in 1996, as a Republican. Jeskewitz served from 1996 until her retirement in 2009.
