= Carol Owens (politician) =

American politician and dairy farmer (1931–2012)

Carol L. Owens (August 8, 1931 – November 3, 2012) was an American politician and dairy farmer in the state of Wisconsin.

Born in Wabeno, Wisconsin, Owens and her husband owned and operated a dairy farm. In 1992, Owens was elected to the Wisconsin State Assembly. Owens served in the Wisconsin State Assembly from 1993 until her retirement in 2009. Owens died in Oshkosh, Wisconsin on November 3, 2012, at the age of 81.
