= Terry Musser =

American politician (1947–2018)

Terry M. Musser (November 15, 1947 November 1, 2018) was an American politician.

He was born in Black River Falls, Wisconsin and graduated from Melrose-Mindoro High School. He went to University of Wisconsin–La Crosse from 1973 to 1976. Musser served in the United States Army and was a Vietnam War veteran. He was a farmer and a driver license examiner. Musser served in the Wisconsin State Assembly from 1985 until his retirement in 2009. He was a Republican. Musser died on November 1, 2018, at Gundersen Health System in La Crosse, Wisconsin.
