= Wisconsin's 21st Assembly district =

American legislative district in Milwaukee County, Wisconsin

Wisconsin's 21st State Assembly district
- 2024 map defined in 2023 Wisc. Act 94; 2022 map defined in Johnson v. Wisconsin Elections Commission; 2011 map was defined in 2011 Wisc. Act 43
Assemblymember
Jessie Rodriguez; R–Oak Creek
since December 4, 2013 (12 years)
- Demographics: 76% White; 4.36% Black; 11.35% Hispanic; 6.4% Asian; 2.04% Native American; 0.11% Hawaiian/Pacific Islander
- Population (2020) • Voting age: 59,343; 46,426
- Website: Official website
- Notes: Milwaukee metro area (southeast)

The 21st Assembly district of Wisconsin is one of 99 districts in the Wisconsin State Assembly. Located in southeastern Wisconsin, the district contains part of southeast Milwaukee County, consisting of all of the suburban city of Oak Creek, far south wards of the city of Milwaukee including the Town of Lake, Tippecanoe, Holler Park, New Coeln, Maitland Park and Gra-Ram neighborhoods as well as a small part of the city of Greenfield. The district also contains Milwaukee Mitchell International Airport and the Oak Creek Power Plant. The district is represented by Republican Jessie Rodriguez, since winning a special election in November 2013.

The 21st Assembly district is located within Wisconsin's 7th Senate district, along with the 19th and 20th Assembly districts.

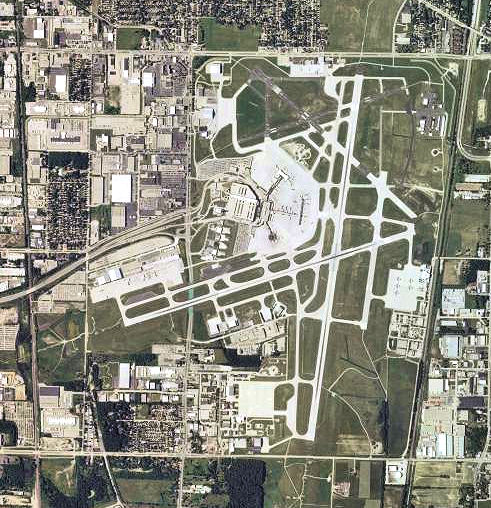
Milwaukee Mitchell International Airport

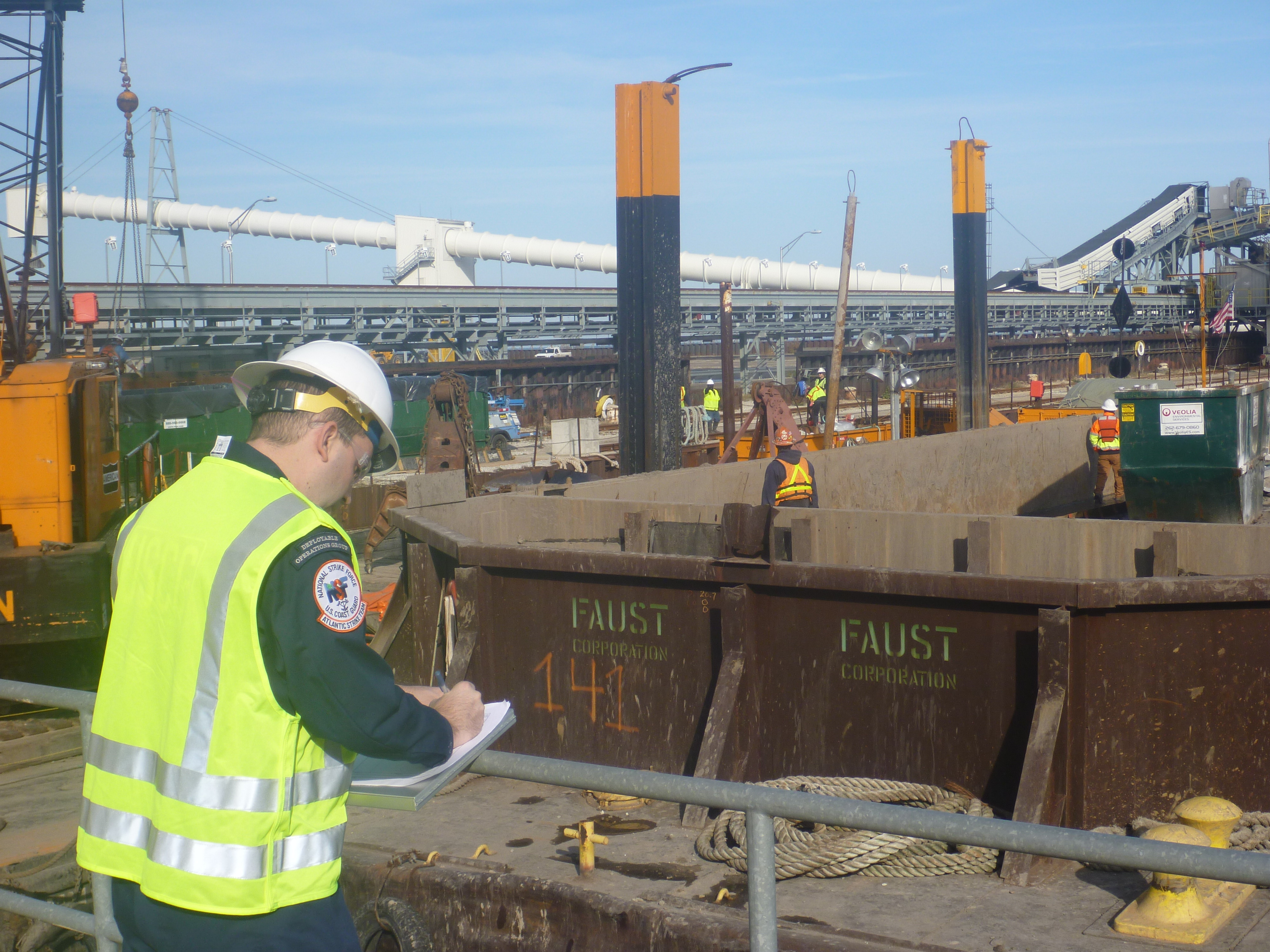
Oak Creek Power Plant

== History ==
The district was created in the 1972 redistricting act (1971 Wisc. Act 304) which first established the numbered district system, replacing the previous system which allocated districts to specific counties. The 21st district was drawn roughly in line with the boundaries of the previous Milwaukee County 24th district (the cities of South Milwaukee and Cudahy). The 21st district boundaries have remained relatively consistent in redistricting since 1972, with the major exception of the court-ordered 1982 redistricting, which scrambled all State Assembly districts and moved the 21st district to Racine County for the 1983–1984 legislative session.

== List of past representatives ==
List of representatives to the Wisconsin State Assembly from the 21st district
Member	Party	Residence	Counties represented	Term start	Term end	Ref.
District created
William P. Atkinson	Dem.	South Milwaukee	Milwaukee	January 1, 1973	January 6, 1975	
Chester A. Gerlach	Dem.	South Milwaukee	Milwaukee	January 6, 1975	January 3, 1983	
Ronald A. Sell	Dem.	Caledonia	Racine	January 3, 1983	January 7, 1985	
Richard Grobschmidt	Dem.	South Milwaukee	Milwaukee	January 7, 1985	January 2, 1996	
--Vacant--			Milwaukee	January 2, 1996	March 26, 1996	
Jeffrey Plale	Dem.	South Milwaukee	Milwaukee	March 26, 1996	May 9, 2003	
--Vacant--			Milwaukee	May 9, 2003	August 4, 2003	
Mark Honadel	Rep.	South Milwaukee	Milwaukee	August 4, 2003	September 18, 2013	
--Vacant--			Milwaukee	September 18, 2013	December 4, 2013	
Jessie Rodriguez	Rep.	Franklin	Milwaukee	December 4, 2013	Current	
Jessie Rodriguez	Rep.	Oak Creek	Milwaukee	December 4, 2013	Current	
Dan J. Bukiewicz	Dem.	Oak Creek	Milwaukee	Taking office January 2027		
