= Chester A. Gerlach =

American politician

Member of the Wisconsin State Assembly
- In office January 3, 1983 – January 7, 1985
- Preceded by: Daniel Fischer
- Succeeded by: Gervase Hephner
- Constituency: 3rd Assembly district
- In office January 6, 1975 – January 3, 1983
- Preceded by: William P. Atkinson
- Succeeded by: Ronald A. Sell
- Constituency: 21st Assembly district

Personal details
- Born: June 26, 1947 (age 79) Milwaukee, Wisconsin, U.S.
- Party: Democratic; Independent (2022)
- Spouse: Barbara
- Children: 3
- Education: St. Norbert College
- Occupation: Educator, politician, lobbyist (retired)

Chester A. "Chet" Gerlach (born June 26, 1947) is a retired American educator, lobbyist, and Democratic politician. He was a member of the Wisconsin State Assembly for five terms, representing Oak Creek and South Milwaukee from 1975 through 1984. After leaving the Assembly, he worked for many years as a lobbyist to the state government.

== Early life and education ==
Gerlach was born on June 26, 1947, in Milwaukee, Wisconsin. He graduated from Don Bosco High School and went on to earn his bachelor's degree from St. Norbert College in 1969. He then received his teaching certification from University of Wisconsin–Milwaukee in 1972 and worked as a teacher.

== Career ==
Gerlach was first elected to the Assembly in 1974, after he defeated incumbent state representative William P. Atkinson in a Democratic Party primary challenge. He was subsequently re-elected in 1976, 1978, and 1980. Following the court-ordered redistricting in 1982, he was elected to a fifth term in what was then the 3rd Assembly district. While serving in the Assembly, he was elected as assistant majority leader for the 1981–1982 session.

Another redistricting occurred in 1983, and rather than running for another term in another new district in 1984, he chose to run in the Democratic primary for an open seat in the Wisconsin State Senate. He came in a distant 2nd behind John Plewa, who went on to win the general election.

After leaving office, Gerlach spent much of the next 30 years as a political consultant and lobbyist to the state government. He subsequently moved to Elkhart Lake, in Sheboygan County, Wisconsin, where he retired in 2019.

In 2022, Gerlach chose to come out of retirement to enter the race for Wisconsin State Assembly in the 27th Assembly district, where he was then residing. The incumbent Republican had chosen not to run for re-election, and there was only one candidate in the race—Republican Amy Binsfeld. Gerlach chose to run as an independent, on a platform of bipartisan cooperation in Madison. Binsfeld ultimately prevailed in the 2022 general election with 64% of the vote.

== Personal life and family ==
Chester Gerlach lives with his wife Barbara in Elkhart Lake, Wisconsin. They have three adult children.

== Electoral history ==
=== Wisconsin Assembly, 21st district (1974–1980) ===
Year	Election	Date	Elected				Defeated				Total	Plurality
1974	Primary	Sep. 9	Chester A. Gerlach	Democratic	3,134	74.51%	William P. Atkinson (inc)	Dem.	928	22.06%	4,206	2,206
1974	Primary	Sep. 9	Chester A. Gerlach	Democratic	3,134	74.51%	John D. St. John	Dem.	122	2.90%	4,206	2,206
1974	General	Nov. 4	Chester A. Gerlach	Democratic	9,215	100.0%	--unopposed--				9,215	N/A
1976	General	Nov. 2	Chester A. Gerlach (inc)	Democratic	9,667	84.17%	Darlene J. Wink	Rep.	1,774	15.45%	11,485	7,893
1978	General	Nov. 6	Chester A. Gerlach (inc)	Democratic	20,264	96.84%	William A. Rinnemake	Rep.	3,743	15.19%	20,926	19,602
1980	Primary	Nov. 4	Chester A. Gerlach (inc)	Democratic	2,931	68.50%	Frank L. Chovanec	Dem.	1,348	31.50%	4,279	1,583
1980	General	Nov. 4	Chester A. Gerlach (inc)	Democratic	15,062	100.0%	--unopposed--				15,062	N/A

=== Wisconsin Assembly, 3rd district (1982) ===
Year	Election	Date	Elected				Defeated				Total	Plurality
1982	Primary	Sep. 14	Chester A. Gerlach	Democratic	6,479	77.71%	Conrad LeBeau	Dem.	1,858	22.29%	8,337	4,621
1982	General	Nov. 2	Chester A. Gerlach	Democratic	12,764	100.0%	--unopposed--				12,764	N/A

=== Wisconsin Senate (1984) ===
Year	Election	Date	Elected				Defeated				Total	Plurality
1984	Primary	Sep. 11	John Plewa	Democratic	11,603	62.42%	Chester A. Gerlach	Dem.	6,582	35.41%	18,590	5,021
1984	Primary	Sep. 11	John Plewa	Democratic	11,603	62.42%	Roman R. Blenski	Dem.	405	2.18%	18,590	5,021

=== Wisconsin Assembly, 27th district (2022) ===
Year	Election	Date	Elected				Defeated				Total	Plurality
2022	General	Nov. 5	Amy Binsfeld	Republican	17,132	64.41%	Chet Gerlach	Ind.	9,373	35.24%	26,599	7,759

Wisconsin State Assembly
Preceded by William P. Atkinson	Member of the Wisconsin State Assembly from the 21st district January 6, 1975 – January 3, 1983	Succeeded by Ronald A. Sell
Preceded by Daniel Fischer	Member of the Wisconsin State Assembly from the 3rd district January 3, 1983 – January 7, 1985	Succeeded by Gervase Hephner
