= Richard Grobschmidt =

American politician (1948–2016)

Member of the Wisconsin Senate from the 7th district
- In office January 2, 1996 – January 13, 2003
- Preceded by: John R. Plewa
- Succeeded by: Jeffrey Plale

Member of the Wisconsin State Assembly from the 21st district
- In office January 7, 1985 – January 2, 1996
- Preceded by: Ronald A. Sell
- Succeeded by: Jeffrey Plale

Personal details
- Born: May 3, 1948 Milwaukee, Wisconsin
- Died: July 23, 2016 (aged 68) Wauwatosa, Wisconsin
- Party: Democratic
- Spouse: Barbara Grobschmidt
- Profession: Educator, Politician

Richard Grobschmidt (May 3, 1948 – July 23, 2016) was an American educator and former Democratic politician from South Milwaukee, Wisconsin. He served five terms in the Wisconsin State Assembly (1985–1995) and parts of three terms in the Wisconsin State Senate (1995–2003), before resigning to take a position with the Wisconsin Department of Public Instruction.

== Background ==
Grobschmidt was born in Milwaukee on May 3, 1948, to Chester W. Grobschmidt and Leone Grobschmidt. His father was mayor of South Milwaukee from 1966 to 1994. Grobschmidt graduated from South Milwaukee High School in 1966; earned a B.S. from University of Wisconsin–Oshkosh in 1972, and a M.S. from University of Wisconsin–Milwaukee in 1979. He taught political science at South Milwaukee High before being elected to the Wisconsin Legislature.

== Legislative service ==
Grobschmidt was elected to the state Assembly in 1984, and re-elected for the next five terms for the 21st district, representing South Milwaukee and portions of Oak Creek. He was elected for the 7th district State Senate seat (representing several southeastern Milwaukee County suburbs, plus a fraction of eastern Milwaukee) in a November 1995 special election; and reelected in 1998 and 2002.

== Department of Public Instruction ==
In December 2002, he announced that he would resign his seat in January 2003 to take a position as Assistant Superintendent of Public Instruction under State Superintendent Elizabeth Burmaster. He retired from that position on September 10, 2010.

== Death and legacy ==
Grobschmidt died on July 23, 2016, in Wauwatosa, Wisconsin. A bridge on the Hank Aaron State Trail in Lakeshore State Park was named after Grobschmidt in 2017.
