= NCFE =

NCFE may refer to:

- National Committee for a Free Europe, an American anti-communist group
- NCFE (charity), formerly the Northern Council for Further Education, a British educational organisation
- National Century Financial Enterprises, an American company involved in the 2003 mutual fund scandal
