= Gary Pilgrim =

Gary Pilgrim (November 5, 1940 – December 25, 2025) was a retired investment manager and a founding partner of Pilgrim, Baxter, Hoyt & Greig, later known as Pilgrim Baxter & Associates. He was best known for his management of the PBHG Growth Fund, one of the most popular growth-style mutual funds of the mid- to late-1990s, and the market-timing scandal associated with that firm's downfall.

== Investing style ==
Pilgrim was considered an innovator in growth stock investing. Early in his career, he developed an aggressive style which utilized an unusually systematic method of identifying small, rapidly growing companies with the potential to beat quarterly earnings expectations, which would result in sharp upward movement of their stock price. He also exhibited little concern over high P/E ratios, and very little tolerance for companies that missed earnings estimates, resulting in relatively high portfolio turnover. This style, sometimes referred to as "earnings momentum", is characterized by high volatility, with a tendency toward dramatic gains or losses.

== Pilgrim, Baxter & Associates ==
Pilgrim started work as a loan officer at Philadelphia National Bank in 1967. He soon moved to the trust department, and over the next decade rose to the position of Senior Vice President. It was at PNB that he met Harold Baxter, Stephen Hoyt, and George Greig, with whom he left in 1982 to establish Pilgrim, Baxter, Hoyt & Greig. (With the departures of Hoyt and later Greig, the company was renamed Pilgrim Baxter & Associates.)

PBH&G was initially dedicated entirely to managing money for institutional pension funds, and as a result was virtually unknown to the general public. In 1985, they entered the mutual fund market with the PBHG Growth Fund. For its first eight years, the fund went largely undiscovered due to the fact that it was a load fund and was not marketed to the public. The fund returned 46.6% in 1993, and rose 225% over the three years ending November 1993. This performance came to light in late 1993 when the fund went no-load and received a torrent of media attention, beginning with the August edition of Money magazine in which it was declared that "few people other than his clients recognize the name of today's hottest fund manager: Gary Pilgrim." At a time when public awareness of mutual funds was rapidly increasing, Pilgrim quickly became one of the industry's most famous names. The fund continued to deliver very strong performance over the next three years - in the beginning of 1996, it had a three-year annualized return of nearly 30%. At the end of June 1996, it was the #1 performer among all equity funds over the previous 10 years, according to Lipper Analytical Services. Meanwhile, the fund's assets under management had increased from about US$8 million in 1993 to US$5 billion in mid-1996. During Pilgrim's peak popularity in 1996, Sheldon Jacobs, the editor in chief of the No-Load Fund Investor, stated, "I have never seen a group that has done so consistently well." The October 1996 Kiplinger's Personal Finance Magazine gave Pilgrim the following review: "Forget Peter Lynch: Gary Pilgrim is the best stock picker of the past five years and the past ten."

Unfortunately for many investors who, in response to massive media attention, bought into the fund at this time, late-1996 to early-1999 was a difficult period for PBHG Growth as market trends turned against small growth stocks, even as the economy at large flourished. During this 10-quarter period, the fund struggled to break even, while the S&P 500 returned 95%.

As the internet technology boom took off, however, PBHG Growth's performance skyrocketed, returning 93% in 1999. But with the economic downturn which began in early 2000, the fund, true to its volatile nature, began to fall precipitously, losing 34% in 2001 and 30% in 2002.

Pilgrim appeared in the 1998 and 2004 editions of Jason Kelly's book The Neatest Little Guide to Stock Market Investing as a "master" investor whose strategy should be studied, though probably not strictly emulated, by individuals seeking success in stock market investing.

== Quotes ==
"Anyone who sticks with a particular investment approach will be frustrated by the market occasionally. Our history suggests that we're usually in the top quartile or bottom quartile of returns and don't spend much time in the middle."

"I'm very confident that as long as I can put together a portfolio of companies growing 40% a year, these stocks can be leaders. In my mind, this is the natural state of affairs."

"As growth managers go, we're among the most aggressive because we always look for companies in the early to middle stages of maturity."

"I focus on companies that are doing well, not ones that have stumbled, or missed by just a little bit. I like to be in a good mood, and every stinker I don't get rid of just irritates me. I like to like my portfolio."

== Market timing ==
On November 20, 2003, both the Securities and Exchange Commission and New York Attorney General Eliot Spitzer filed charges against Pilgrim, Harold J. Baxter, and PBA for civil securities fraud and breach of fiduciary duties. Pilgrim was accused of allowing one of his friends, Michael Christiani, the manager of a hedge fund called Appalachian Trails L.P., to use a market timing strategy which rapidly traded shares of, among other funds, the PBHG Growth Fund. Though market timing is not illegal, it had begun to be considered potentially deleterious to buy-and-hold investors. In fact, at the time charges were brought in 2003, PBA had already expelled all market timers from its funds and had allowed no such activity since December 2001. There were no accusations or evidence of the illegal late trading which factored in several other cases of the 2003 mutual fund scandal.

On November 17, 2004, the S.E.C. announced a settlement which forbade Pilgrim and Baxter from publicly denying wrongdoing, and required each to personally pay US$80 million while PBA would pay US$90 million, for a total of US$250 million. In addition, both Pilgrim and Baxter were permanently forbidden from employment in an investment-advisory capacity.

Despite attempts to recover, the PBHG Funds brand was too badly damaged by the incident to remain viable. In 2004, PBA was renamed Liberty Ridge Capital by parent company Old Mutual. The PBHG Funds were absorbed into the Old Mutual Funds group, and Liberty Ridge Capital ceased operating in 2009.

== Philanthropy ==
In 1998, Pilgrim established the Pilgrim Foundation, with the purpose of benefiting vulnerable women and children in Chester County, Pennsylvania. The foundation has since expanded its mission to support non-profit work nationally and internationally.
