= Gervase Hephner =

20th century American politician

Gervase A. Hephner

Member of the Wisconsin State Assembly
- In office January 7, 1985 – January 5, 1987
- Preceded by: Chester A. Gerlach
- Succeeded by: Alvin Ott
- Constituency: 3rd Assembly district
- In office January 3, 1983 – January 7, 1985
- Preceded by: James A. Rutkowski
- Succeeded by: James A. Rutkowski
- Constituency: 82nd Assembly district
- In office January 1, 1973 – January 3, 1983
- Preceded by: Position established
- Succeeded by: Gus Menos
- Constituency: 6th Assembly district
- In office January 2, 1967 – January 1, 1973
- Preceded by: Wilmer H. Struebing
- Succeeded by: Position abolished
- Constituency: Calumet County district

Personal details
- Born: February 5, 1936 Rantoul, Wisconsin, U.S.
- Died: June 26, 2011 (aged 75) Calumet Medical Center; Chilton, Wisconsin, U.S.
- Resting place: Saint Augustine Cemetery, Chilton
- Party: Democratic
- Spouse: Kay Berger (m. 1956–2011)
- Children: 4
- Education: University of Wisconsin–Oshkosh (B.S.)
- Occupation: Farmer, politician

Military service
- Allegiance: United States
- Branch/service: United States Army
- Years of service: 1954–1956
- Rank: Specialist, USA
- Battles/wars: Korean War

Gervase Andrew Hephner (February 5, 1936 – June 26, 2011) was an American farmer, lobbyist, and Democratic politician from Chilton, Wisconsin. He served ten terms as a member of the Wisconsin State Assembly, representing Calumet County from 1967 to 1987.

== Early life and education ==
Gervase Hephner was born in a beetweeder's shack on his family farm in the town of Rantoul, Wisconsin. He attended parochial schools and graduated from Chilton High School. At age 18, he enlisted in the United States Army for service in the Korean War, and served as a driver for General Maxwell D. Taylor. He mustered out with the rank of specialist in 1956. He subsequently attended St. Norbert College in De Pere, Wisconsin, before earning his bachelor's degree from the University of Wisconsin–Oshkosh in 1960.

== Political career ==
As a young man, Hephner worked as a machinist, and was then employed as a sales representative with the Addressograph Multigraph Corporation after graduating from college. He became active in politics with the Democratic Party of Wisconsin during this era, and made his first run for public office in 1962, running for treasurer of Calumet County against Republican incumbent Merlin Zahn. At the same election, his younger brother, Patrick, ran for register of deeds in neighboring Winnebago County. Both brothers lost their elections.

Gervase was subsequently elected secretary of the Calumet County Democratic Party. In 1966, he won his first elected office, defeating incumbent Republican state representative Wilmer H. Struebing for his seat in the Wisconsin State Assembly. He ran on opposition to a recent hike in the gas tax, and capitalized on outrage against a recent 70% pay hike for state legislators. The state Republican Party was also embroiled in a small scandal as two of their leaders had been indicted for bribery. Hephner won a narrow victory in that election, prevailing by just 203 votes, but he went on to substantial victories running for re-election in that district in 1968 and 1970.

In 1971, Wisconsin underwent one of the most significant redistricting events in the state history, when the Legislature passed 1971 Wis. Act 304, reducing the number of state representatives from 100 to 99 and—for the first time—allowing legislative districts to cross county boundaries. In 1972, Hephner ran for election in the new 6th State Assembly district, comprising all of Calumet County along with much of rural eastern Fond du Lac County and small portions of northwest Sheboygan County and northern Washington County. In the new district, Hephner faced his first competitive primary election in 1972, but prevailed over Democratic challenger Bernard Brown. In the general election, he faced the chairman of the Fond du Lac County board of supervisors, Wilbert Halbach, and went on to win with 56% of the vote. Hephner would win four more elections in this district.

In 1982, the Wisconsin legislature failed to pass a redistricting plan, and a panel of United States federal judges imposed their own redistricting plan on the state. Under that plan, Hephner resided in the 82nd Assembly district, which then comprised most of Calumet County, parts of the city of Appleton, and several small municipalities in southeast Outagamie County. Hephner survived in the new district, defeating a Democratic primary challenge and a Republican opponent in the 1982 general election.

In the next legislative term, the Legislature and Governor agreed on a new redistricting plan to supersede the 1982 court-ordered map, so Hephner now saw his fourth and final district configuration. His district was renumbered as the 3rd State Assembly district under the 1983 plan. Under the new plan, the district took on nearly half of the city of Appleton and added a few additional municipalities from rural southeast Calumet County and northern Fond du Lac County. In the 1984 election, Hephner won his tenth and final term in the Wisconsin State Assembly with 57% of the vote, defeating Republican Alberta Churchill.

Hephner began openly campaigning to be appointed state secretary of agriculture after the December 1985 resignation of incumbent La Verne Ausman. During his campaign for that appointment, he began to privately inform Democratic leaders in the state that he would not run for Assembly again regardless of whether he received the appointment. In Wisconsin, the secretary of agriculture is chosen by a board, rather than a direct gubernatorial appointment, so the decision was somewhat removed from the hands of Democratic political operatives. Those operatives, however, did see opportunity for Hephner to seek higher office, and considered him a strong candidate to challenge Republican congressman Tom Petri. The state agriculture board ultimately chose non-political candidate Howard C. Richards for the secretary job.

Ultimately, the incumbent Lieutenant Governor of Wisconsin, James T. Flynn, announced he would not seek re-election, and Hephner quickly declared his candidacy for that office. He faced a crowded Democratic primary, but his principal opponent was Green Bay area state representative Sharon Metz. Metz also had a strong agriculture background, and emphasized the symbolic nature of her candidacy as potentially the first female lieutenant governor of the state. Hephner came in a distant second in the five-person primary field. The Democratic ticket went down to defeat in the 1986 general election.

After losing his bid for lieutenant governor, Hephner worked for nearly a decade as a lobbyist in Madison. He retired in 1993.

== Personal life and family ==
Gervase Hephner was the third of five children born to Marshall Hephner Sr. and his wife Hazel (née Senn). His younger brother, Patrick, was a career United States Navy officer, served three deployments to Vietnam, and retired with the rank of captain. Gervase ultimately inherited the family farm, which was established by his great-grandfather in 1866.

Two of their cousins were charged in separate bank robberies in the early 1960s, the latter was a major news story in Wisconsin 1965.

Gervase Hephner married Kay Berger in 1956. They had two daughters and two adopted sons, and were married for 55 years before his death in 2011. In addition to his work and political activities, Hephner was active in the Knights of Columbus and the Fraternal Order of Eagles, and planted thousands of trees on a plat of land he owned in Marinette County, Wisconsin.

Gervase Hephner died at Calumet Medical Center on June 26, 2011. His body was interred at Saint Augustine Catholic Cemetery in Chilton.

== Electoral history ==
=== Wisconsin Lieutenant Governor (1986) ===
Wisconsin Lieutenant Gubernatorial Election, 1986
Party	Candidate	Votes	%	±%
Democratic Primary, September 9, 1986
Democratic	Sharon Metz	101,753	42.01%	
Democratic	Gervase A. Hephner	52,313	21.60%	
Democratic	Cletus J. Johnson	50,795	20.97%	
Democratic	Taylor Benson	29,353	12.12%	
Democratic	Arlyn F. Wollenburg	7,984	3.30%	
Plurality		49,440	20.41%	
Total votes		242,198	100.0%	

Wisconsin State Assembly
Preceded by Wilmer H. Struebing	Member of the Wisconsin State Assembly from the Calumet County district January 2, 1967 – January 1, 1973	District abolished
District established by 1971 Wis. Act 304	Member of the Wisconsin State Assembly from the 6th district January 1, 1973 – January 3, 1983	Succeeded by Gus Menos
Preceded by James A. Rutkowski	Member of the Wisconsin State Assembly from the 82nd district January 3, 1983 – January 7, 1985	Succeeded by James A. Rutkowski
Preceded by Chester A. Gerlach	Member of the Wisconsin State Assembly from the 3rd district January 7, 1985 – January 5, 1987	Succeeded by Alvin Ott
