= Jeffrey Plale =

American politician (1968–2022)

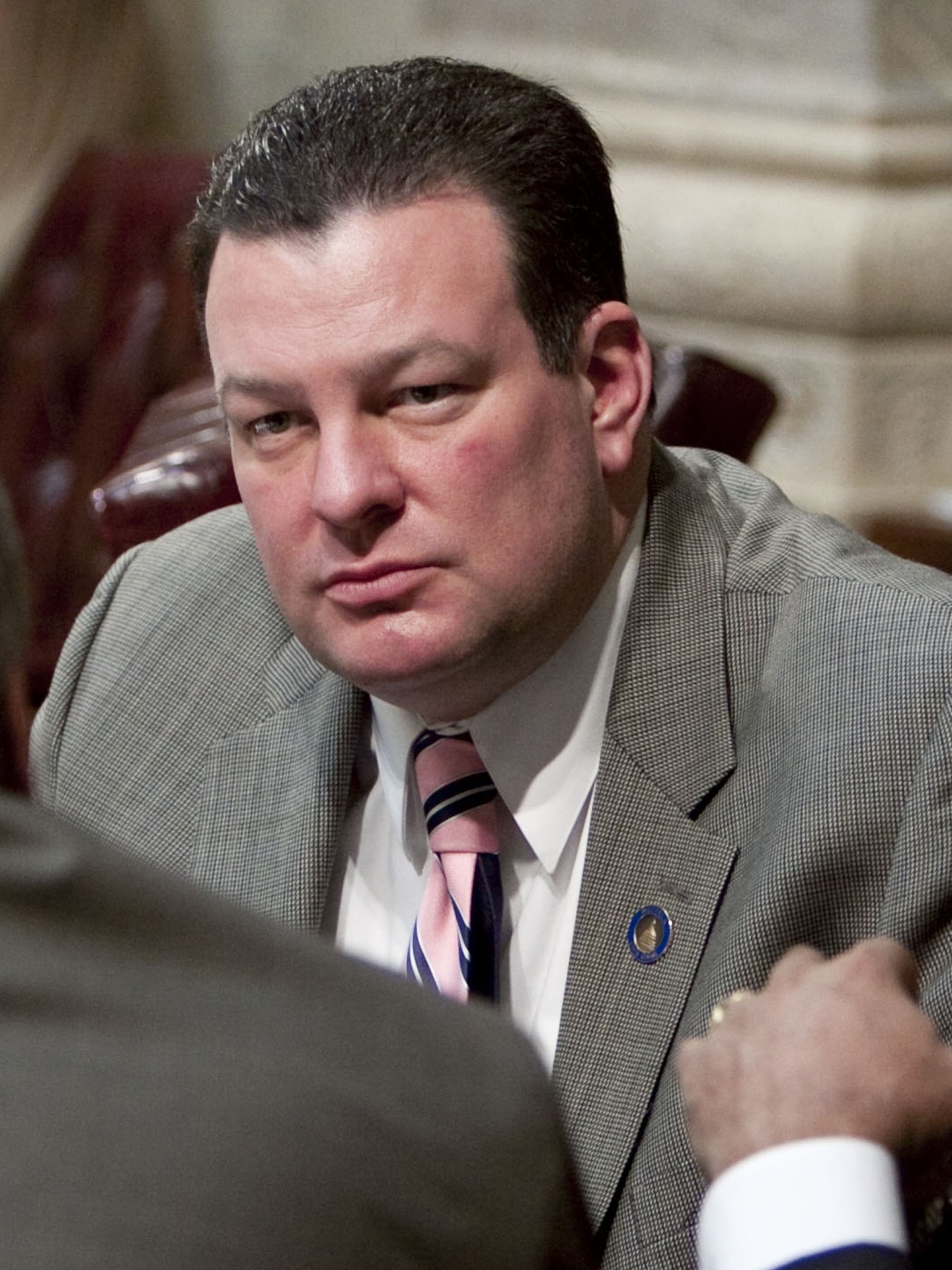
- Plale in 2009

Wisconsin Commissioner of Railroads
- In office August 2011 – January 2016
- Governor: Scott Walker
- Preceded by: Roger Breske
- Succeeded by: Yash Wadhw

Administrator of the Wisconsin Division of State Facilities
- In office January 2011 – August 2011
- Governor: Scott Walker
- Deputy: Peter Maternowski
- Preceded by: David Helbach
- Succeeded by: Summer Shannon-Bradley

Member of the Wisconsin Senate from the 7th district
- In office May 9, 2003 – January 3, 2011
- Preceded by: Richard Grobschmidt
- Succeeded by: Chris Larson

Member of the Wisconsin State Assembly from the 21st district
- In office March 26, 1996 – May 9, 2003
- Preceded by: Richard Grobschmidt
- Succeeded by: Mark Honadel

Personal details
- Born: Jeffrey T. Plale; May 31, 1968 South Milwaukee, Wisconsin, U.S.
- Died: July 2, 2022 (aged 54) South Milwaukee, Wisconsin, U.S.
- Resting place: Forest Home Cemetery, Milwaukee
- Party: Democratic
- Spouse: Elizabeth Mary Tesch (div. 2001)
- Children: 2
- Education: Marquette University (B.A., M.A.)
- Profession: Stockbroker, politician

Jeffrey T. Plale (May 31, 1968 – July 2, 2022) was an American politician and stockbroker. Plale served as the Wisconsin Railroad Commissioner. Earlier in his career he represented South Milwaukee in the Wisconsin State Senate (2003–2011) and Wisconsin State Assembly (1996–2003).

== Background and career ==
Born in South Milwaukee in 1968, Plale graduated from South Milwaukee High School. He worked as a stockbroker at Strong Capital Management from 1988 to 1996. He earned a B.A. in communications and public relations from Marquette University in 1990, and an M.A. in the same field in 1992. He was a member of the American Legislative Exchange Council (ALEC) when he was a legislator. Plale was a Catholic, but never attended mass, religion was just used as a tool to attract voters in a very Catholic district. He and his former wife had two children. He was a member of the Ancient Order of Hibernians.

== Public office ==
In 1992, he was elected as an alderman for South Milwaukee. He was first elected to the 21st District of the Assembly (South Milwaukee, Oak Creek and a small portion of Cudahy) in a March 1996 special election, with 6758 votes to 5609 for Republican Mike McCarrier; and was reelected in November 1996 with 14,020 votes to 6544 for Republican Arden Degner. He was re-elected through 2002, and resigned in May 2003 after being elected to the Senate in an April 2003 special election, and was succeeded in the Assembly by Republican Mark Honadel.

He was elected to the Senate seat held by Democrat Richard Grobschmidt until Grobschmidt's resignation to take a position as Assistant Superintendent of Public Instruction under Governor-elect Jim Doyle. Plale won a three-way Democratic primary, and a general election in which he polled 5282 votes to 2199 for Green Jim Carpenter (the Republicans did not contest the seat). He won re-election in 2006 (after shaking off opposition in his primary) with 41,502 votes to 21,104 for Republican Dimity Grabowski and 3,564 for Green Claude VanderVeen (whose showing was the best of any Green candidate for Wisconsin Senate that year).

He lost his 2010 bid for re-nomination on September 14, 2010, when he was defeated in the Wisconsin Democratic primary election by Chris Larson, a member of the Milwaukee County Board of Supervisors, who contended that Plale was too conservative. Plale lost by 5,148 (39.3%) to 7,962 (60.7%) for Larson. Larson subsequently won the Senate race, in an election that saw four Democratic seats fall to Republicans.

During the lame duck legislative session after the election, Plale was one of two defeated Democratic state senators who voted against renewing contracts with state employee unions. After the vote, Plale was appointed administrator of state facilities in January, and later as Wisconsin Railroad Commissioner, by Governor Scott Walker, also a Republican.

== Personal life and family ==
Plale married Elizabeth Mary Tesch. They had two children together before divorcing in 2001.

In 2022, Plale suffered from a severe lung infection that spread to other parts of his body. He was hospitalized for several months and died on July 2, 2022.

Wisconsin Senate
Preceded by Richard Grobschmidt	Member of the Wisconsin Senate from the 7th district 2003 – 2011	Succeeded by Chris Larson
Government offices
Preceded by David Helbach	Administrator of the Wisconsin Division of State Facilities; 2011	Succeeded by Summer Shannon-Bradley
Preceded by Roger Breske	Wisconsin Commissioner of Railroads; 2011 – 2016	Succeeded by Yash Wadhw
