= James A. Rutkowski =

20th century American politician

Member of the Wisconsin State Assembly
- In office January 7, 1985 – December 7, 1997
- Preceded by: Gervase Hephner
- Succeeded by: Jeff A. Stone
- Constituency: 82nd district
- In office January 3, 1983 – January 7, 1985
- Preceded by: David E. Paulson
- Succeeded by: David E. Paulson
- Constituency: 28th district
- In office January 1, 1973 – January 3, 1983
- Preceded by: District established
- Succeeded by: Gervase Hephner
- Constituency: 82nd district
- In office January 4, 1971 – January 1, 1973
- Preceded by: Jerry J. Wing
- Succeeded by: District abolished
- Constituency: Milwaukee 23rd district

Personal details
- Born: April 6, 1942 (age 84) Milwaukee, Wisconsin, U.S.
- Party: Democratic
- Spouse: Jean
- Children: None
- Education: Marquette University (B.S., J.D.)

Military service
- Allegiance: United States
- Branch/service: United States Army; U.S. Army Reserve
- Years of service: 1966–1972
- Unit: Army Security Agency; Judge Advocate General's Corps

James A. Rutkowski (born April 6, 1942) is a retired American attorney and Democratic politician. He served 27 years in the Wisconsin State Assembly (1971–1997) representing southwest Milwaukee County.

== Biography ==
Rutkowski was born on April 6, 1942, in Milwaukee, Wisconsin. He graduated from Bay View High School and Marquette University. In 1966, Rutkowski joined the United States Army Reserve. After initially serving in the United States Army Security Agency, he transferred to the Judge Advocate General's Corps in 1969. He remained with the Reserve until 1972. Additionally, Rutkowksi was a member of the faculty at Marquette University and the University of Wisconsin–Milwaukee. He is a member of the Knights of Columbus and the United States Junior Chamber.

== Political career ==
Rutkowski was elected to the Assembly in 1970. That same year, he was elected to be a trustee of Hales Corners, Wisconsin. He was reelected to the Assembly 13 times and resigned in December 1997 to accept an appointment to the state Labor and Industry Review Commission.
