= Jessie Rodriguez =

21st century American politician (born 1977)

Member of the Wisconsin State Assembly from the 21st district
- Incumbent
- Assumed office December 4, 2013
- Preceded by: Mark Honadel

Personal details
- Born: Yesenia Edelmira Garay; July 5, 1977 (age 49) Puerto El Triunfo, El Salvador
- Party: Republican
- Spouse: Aaron M. Rodriguez
- Children: 1
- Education: Marquette University (BA)
- Occupation: Public relations, politician
- Website: Official website

Yesenia Edelmira "Jessie" Rodriguez (née Garay born July 5, 1977) is a Salvadoran American immigrant and Republican politician from Milwaukee County, Wisconsin. She is a member of the Wisconsin State Assembly, representing Wisconsin's 21st Assembly district since December 2013. She is the first Hispanic immigrant elected to the Wisconsin Legislature.

== Early life and education ==
Jessie Rodriguez was born Yesenia Edelmira Garay, on July 5, 1977, in the Usulután Department, El Salvador. As a child, in 1984, she emigrated to the United States with her family, eventually settling in Milwaukee, Wisconsin. She graduated from Milwaukee's Alexander Hamilton High School in 1996 and went on to attend Milwaukee's Marquette University where she earned her bachelor's degree in communications in 2002. After graduating college, Jessie worked as an analyst for a large supermarket chain, but eventually landed a job as a communications outreach coordinator for Hispanics for School Choice.

== Political career ==
Her prominent role in the school voucher movement in Milwaukee County made Rodriguez a close political ally of Republican county executive and later governor Scott Walker.

When the Republican Legislature drew up their redistricting plan following the 2010 U.S. census, the 21st state Assembly district—then comprising the cities of Oak Creek and South Milwaukee—was slightly adjusted, adding just a few blocks of the neighboring city of Franklin. Those few blocks of Franklin contained the home where Rodriguez then resided.

In August 2013, the state representative in Rodriguez's new district, Mark Honadel, announced he would resign in the middle of his term to take a job in the private sector. Governor Walker called a special election in the 21st district seat, to serve out the remainder of the 2013–2014 term. Rodriguez won the special Republican primary for the seat in October, taking 48% of the vote against a field of four opponents. In its configuration at that time, the 21st Assembly district was considered competitive but slightly Republican-leaning—Republican presidential nominee Mitt Romney had edged out Barack Obama in the 2012 general election by two percentage points in the district. Rodriguez slightly overperformed that benchmark in her special election, defeating Democrat Elizabeth Coppola with 56% of the vote.

She was sworn in as a member of the Wisconsin State Assembly on December 4, 2013. She was re-elected without opposition at the 2014 general election and joined the Assembly Republican caucus leadership team in the 2015–2016 term as majority caucus secretary. She was comfortably re-elected in 2016, 2018, 2020, and 2022. In the 2021–2022 legislative term, Rodriguez stepped down from her caucus leadership position and was appointed to a coveted seat on the Joint Finance Committee; Joint Finance is considered the most powerful committee in the state legislature, whose 16 members oversee all of the state's appropriations and revenues.

In 2024, Wisconsin underwent a significant redistricting which undid the Republican partisan advantage that had existed in the state since 2011. Rodriguez's district was significantly affected as the more Republican leaning areas of Franklin were removed from the district and replaced with more Democratic leaning wards from the southern reaches of the city of Milwaukee. The neighboring Democratic-leaning city of South Milwaukee was also removed from the district. Under the new maps, she won re-election for the 21st Assembly district with 51.4% of the vote, making it one of the most politically competitive districts in the State Assembly.

== Personal life and family ==
Jessie Garay took the last name Rodriguez when she married Aaron Rodriguez. They have one child and reside in Oak Creek, Wisconsin.

== Electoral history ==
Year	Election	Date	Elected				Defeated				Total	Plurality
2013 (special)	Special; Primary	Oct. 22	Jessie Rodriguez	Republican	1,513	47.82%	Chris Kujawa	Rep.	866	27.37%	3,164	647
2013 (special)	Special; Primary	Oct. 22	Jessie Rodriguez	Republican	1,513	47.82%	Ken Gehl	Rep.	536	16.94%	3,164	647
2013 (special)	Special; Primary	Oct. 22	Jessie Rodriguez	Republican	1,513	47.82%	Larry Gamble	Rep.	170	5.37%	3,164	647
2013 (special)	Special; Primary	Oct. 22	Jessie Rodriguez	Republican	1,513	47.82%	Jason Red Arnold	Rep.	73	2.31%	3,164	647
2013 (special)	Special	Nov. 19	Jessie Rodriguez	Republican	4,557	56.40%	Elizabeth Coppola	Dem.	3,523	43.60%	8,080	1,034
2014	General	Nov. 4	Jessie Rodriguez (inc.)	Republican	16,051	96.54%	--unopposed--				16,626	15,476
2016	General	Nov. 8	Jessie Rodriguez (inc.)	Republican	16,589	59.30%	Jack Redmond	Dem.	11,338	40.53%	27,975	5,251
2018	General	Nov. 6	Jessie Rodriguez (inc.)	Republican	14,280	54.66%	Gabriel A. Gomez	Dem.	11,806	45.19%	26,123	2,474
2020	General	Nov. 3	Jessie Rodriguez (inc.)	Republican	17,729	54.61%	Erik Brooks	Dem.	14,708	45.30%	32,466	3,021
2022	General	Nov. 8	Jessie Rodriguez (inc.)	Republican	13,712	54.18%	Nathan M. Jurowski	Dem.	11,580	45.75%	25,309	2,132
2024	General	Nov. 5	Jessie Rodriguez (inc.)	Republican	16,923	51.27%	David L. Marstellar	Dem.	15,993	48.45%	33,009	930

Wisconsin State Assembly
Preceded by Mark Honadel	Member of the Wisconsin State Assembly from the 21st district December 4, 2013 – present	Incumbent
