= Robert Pozen =

American Businessman

Bob Pozen
- Born: Robert Charles Pozen; August 8, 1946 (age 80); Bridgeport, Connecticut, U.S.
- Education: Harvard University (BA); Yale University (JD)
- Spouse: Elizabeth Kelner Pozen
- Children: 2

Robert Charles Pozen (born August 8, 1946), known as "Bob", is an American financial executive with a strong interest in public policy. He is the former chairman of MFS Investment Management, the oldest mutual fund company in the United States. Previously, Pozen was the President of Fidelity Investments.

In 2001 and 2002, he served as a member of President George W. Bush's Commission to Strengthen Social Security. His proposal for utilizing a "progressive indexing" methodology to address Social Security's long-term solvency issue received national attention, including a mention during President Bush's 2006 State of the Union address.

He is a Senior Lecturer at the MIT Sloan School of Management and a nonresident senior fellow at the Brookings Institution. He is also an executive coach and mentor, teaching executives about how to be more productive.

== Early life, education and personal life ==
Pozen was born in Connecticut into a Jewish family, where he attended public high school and won a scholarship to attend Harvard College. In 1968, he graduated summa cum laude and Phi Beta Kappa from Harvard, which awarded him a Knox Traveling Fellowship.

In 1972, Pozen received a J.D. degree from Yale Law School, where he served on the editorial board of the Yale Law Journal. He received a JSD from Yale in 1973 for his doctoral thesis on state enterprises in Africa. He is a member of the Massachusetts, New York and Washington, D.C. bars.

He is married to Elizabeth Kelner Pozen, a psychotherapist and figurative painter. They live in Boston, Massachusetts, and have two adult children.

== Career ==
=== Investment industry ===
Pozen was an executive at Fidelity Investments from 1987 to 2001, eventually rising to vice chairman of the company and president of FMR Co., the investment adviser to Fidelity's mutual funds. In the latter role, he had oversight of Fidelity's global portfolio management and research teams; during his tenure as president, Fidelity's assets under management increased from $500 billion to $900 billion. He also was a director of Fidelity's insurance company and credit card bank.

Pozen became chairman of MFS Investment Management in February 2004. In that position, he advised the firm on strategic initiatives and long-term planning. Under his leadership, MFS's assets under management nearly tripled from $130 billion in 2004 to $360 billion in 2011. Speaking on corporate governance, he has been credited with enhancing the organization's legal, audit, and risk functions. He retired as Chairman in July 2010 and was Chairman Emeritus through 2011. In 2011, he was recognized for his work in the mutual fund industry with the Fund Action Lifetime Achievement Award.

=== Executive coaching ===
In 2019, he started teaching a course on "Maximizing Your Personal Productivity" for corporations around the globe as well as for the MIT Executive Education program. Pozen is also an executive coach. His teachings are based on his 2019 research published by MIT News, "How does your productivity stack up? Survey results and research by MIT Sloan's Bob Pozen reveal common habits and skills among highly productive managers". In 2012, Pozen published his book "Extreme Productivity: Boost Your Results, Reduce Your Hours" (2012, Harper Business) which set the foundation for his coursework.

=== Board service ===
Pozen joined the IFRS Foundation Trustees in January 2021. He is a member of the American Academy of Arts and Sciences, and has served as a director of Nielsen and Medtronic.

=== Teaching positions ===
- 1973–1974: Visiting professor, Georgetown University Law Center
- 1974–1978: Associate professor, New York University Law School
- 2002–2003: John Olin Visiting Professor, Harvard Law School
- 2006–2007: Senior lecturer, MIT Sloan School of Management
- 2007–2013: Senior lecturer, Harvard Business School
- 2013–present: Senior Lecturer, MIT Sloan School of Management

In December 2019, MIT announced the Miriam Pozen Prize to recognize outstanding financial policy research or practices. Pozen is funding the $200,000 prize, MIT's first in the financial policy area, which has since been awarded biennially. The inaugural recipient was former Federal Reserve Vice Chair Stanley Fischer in 2021, followed by former European Central Bank President Mario Draghi in 2023.

=== Public service ===
In addition to his private sector and teaching posts, Pozen has dedicated time during his career to public service. He was Associate General Counsel for the U.S. Securities and Exchange Commission (SEC) from 1977 to 1980.

In 2001 and 2002, he served as a member of President George W. Bush's Commission to Strengthen Social Security. His proposal for utilizing a "progressive indexing" methodology to address Social Security's long-term solvency issue received national attention, including a mention during President Bush's 2006 State of the Union address.

At the state level, Pozen served as Secretary of Economic Affairs in 2003 under then-Massachusetts Governor Mitt Romney during a time of economic uncertainty after the 2001 US recession. Pozen was responsible for all economic-related areas, including banking, technology, consumer affairs, insurance, and labor.

In 2007, Pozen served as chairman of the SEC's Committee to Improve Financial Reporting. Working with both private and public sector experts, the committee made several actionable recommendations to improve the U.S. financial reporting system, many of which have been implemented.

== Key publications ==
=== Selected books ===
- Remote Inc.: How to Thrive at Work…Wherever You Are (with Alexandra Samuel, 2021, Harper Business)
- Extreme Productivity: Boost Your Results, Reduce Your Hours (2012, Harper Business)
- The Fund Industry: How Your Money is Managed (with Theresa Hamacher, 2011, John Wiley)
- Too Big to Save? How to Fix the U.S. Financial System (2009, John Wiley)
- Financial Institutions: Investment Management (1997, West Publishing)

=== Selected productivity articles and videos by Pozen and about Pozen's work ===
- Fortune, "A new measure of success: Counting hours worked isn't cutting it anymore" (April 20, 2021)
- Fortune, "Why the Fed Lowering Interest Rates Would Be a Mistake" (July 29, 2019)
- MIT News, "How does your productivity stack up?" Survey results and research by MIT Sloan's Bob Pozen reveal common habits and skills among highly productive managers. (July 16, 2019)
- Harvard Business Review, "What Makes Some People More Productive Than Others" (with Kevin Downey, March 28, 2019)
- Fortune, "Americans Deserve to Know Who's Behind Online Political Ads" (with Dipayan Ghosh, November 2, 2018)
- Harvard Business Review, "Assessment: How Productive Are You?" (August 28, 2018)
- Fortune, "Having Too Much Employer Stock in Your 401(k) Is Dangerous. Just Look at GE" (with Ming Liu and Bethany Cianciolo, June 20, 2018)
- Fortune, "Commentary: The BlackRock Letter Sets Ambitious Goals. Here's How CEOs Can Meet Them." (February 9, 2018)
- MIT Sloan Executive Education innovation@work Blog, "Supercharge your productivity: 3 big ideas from Bob Pozen" (February 4, 2018)
- Fortune, "Commentary: Public Companies Are About to Be Flooded With Cash. How Will They Spend It?" (with Robert K. Steel, January 10, 2018)
- Fortune, "How President Trump Can Actually Pass Corporate Tax Reform" (April 5, 2017)
- Fortune, "Wall Street Could Still Love President Trump Even If Dodd-Frank Is Here to Stay" (February 8, 2017)
- Fortune, "Donald Trump's Tax Plan Could Tack $10 Trillion onto America's Debt" (March 8, 2016)
- MIT Sloan Executive Education, Video, "Maximizing Your Personal Productivity" (October 16, 2015)
- Fortune, "Pfizer's bid for AstraZeneca: It's time to reform the U.S. corporate tax system" (May 5, 2014)
- Fortune, "U.S. corporate tax reform: why Obama's good ideas don't add up" (February 5, 2015)
- Fortune, "myRA is not the way to save for retirement" (February 21, 2014)
- MIT Sloan Executive Education, "Five tips for improving every-day productivity" (February 13, 2014)
- Harvard Business Review, "The Delicate Art of Giving Feedback" (March 28, 2013)
- Fast Company, "Bob Pozen, Master Of Extreme Productivity, Shares His 3 Most Effective Career Tips" by Drake Baer (October 25, 2012)
- Harvard Business Review, "Managing Yourself: Extreme Productivity" May 2011

=== Selected financial articles ===
- Forbes, "Are Target-Date Funds Playing It Too Safe?" (discussing Pozen's 90/10 stock-cash strategy for retirees, August 2026)
- The Hill, "Investing in America: Why automatic retirement savings are the future"
- Barron's, "Traditional Financial Wisdom Says a 60-40 Portfolio Is Best. Is that Still True?" (June 2026)
- Wall Street Journal, "Don't Buy the 60-40 Portfolio. Go for 90-10 Instead" (May 2026)
- Washington Post, "Why is Trump blocking this bridge to Canada? Something stinks" (February 24, 2026)
- Morningstar, "Tariff ruling sparks 'refund chaos' that small businesses and families can't afford" (February 2026)
- MarketWatch, "Why 401(k) and other retirement savers can be thankful Fidelity's Ned Johnson was such a visionary" (March 2022)
- MarketWatch, "Activist shareholders are pushing companies to embrace ESG and other social causes, but one big question is still unanswered" (February 2022)
- CFO, "ISSB Represents a Big Step in ESG Disclosures" (February 1, 2022)
- International Banker, "The Paradox of AI and Investing" (with S.P. Kothari)
- MarketWatch, "Opinion: 7 states where Obamacare is cheaper and works better" (January 6, 2020)
- MarketWatch, "Opinion: This is the tax break America's 1% will cling to—even after death" (December 14, 2019)
- Harvard Business Review, "What Machine Learning Will Mean for Asset Managers" (with Jonathan Ruane, December 3, 2019)
- Financial Times, "Will bots replace humans in active equity investment?" (October 1, 2019)
- MarketWatch, "Opinion: Tie CEO pay to increases in shareholder value" (Sept 9, 2019)
- CFO, "What Canada Teaches Us About Internal Controls" (July 31, 2019)
- Pensions&Investments, "Commentary: Board composition drives performance in public plans" (August 19, 2019)
- MarketWatch, "Opinion: 401(k) retirees won't buy annuities unless they are better designed" (July 15, 2019)
- Wall Street Journal, Opinion, "Executive Pay Needs a Transparent Scorecard" (Robert J. Jackson Jr. and Robert C. Pozen April 10, 2019)
- Financial Times, "EU's attempt to tackle ‘ratings shopping' is falling short" (June 14, 2018)
- Financial Times, "Spotify's direct listing is a template for unicorns riding high" (January 20, 2018)
- Financial Times, "Trump tax bills push US jobs and factories abroad" (November 28, 2017)
- Financial Times, "In defence of quarterly reports" (October 9, 2016)
- Wall Street Journal, "Opinion: Keeping Corporate Managements Honest" (August 19, 2013)
- Financial Times, "Short-selling bans are a mistake" (August 12, 2011)
- Science Translational Medicine, "Defining Success for Translational Research Organizations" (with Heather Kline, August 3, 2011)
- Huffington Post, "Social Security Reform Is the Key to the Debt Ceiling Debate" (July 19, 2011)
- Washington Post, "A debt plan Republicans can support" (July 19, 2011)
- Washington Post, "Wading into money-market funds?" (with Theresa Hamacher, July 6, 2011)
- Financial Times, "Don't hobble money market funds" (with Theresa Hamacher, June 19, 2011)
- Harvard Business Review, "Managing Yourself: Extreme Productivity" (May 2011)
- Financial Times, "European funds are outgunning US rivals" (with Theresa Hamacher, April 13, 2011)
- Washington Post, "A bond backfire after racing to buy long-term Treasuries and sell tax-exempt funds" (with Theresa Hamacher, April 5, 2011)
- Morningstar Advisor, "The Global Fund-Leadership Playoffs: Europe vs. the U.S." (with Theresa Hamacher, April/May 2011)
- Forbes, "Heretic Reality: Mortgage Interest Deduction Needs To Be Slashed" (March 25, 2011)
- Washington Post, "Why Liberals Should Back Social Security Reform" (March 22, 2011)
- Financial Times, "Japan can rebuild on new economic foundations" (March 21, 2011)
- Wall Street Journal, "A New Model for Corporate Boards" (December 30, 2010)
- Harvard Business Review, "The Case for Professional Boards" (December 2010)
- New York Times, "For Social Security, A Birthday Makeover" (August 22, 2010)
- Wall Street Journal, "Bashing Beijing Will Not Help Our Trade Deficit" (August 20, 2010)
- Wall Street Journal, "$100,000 is Plenty for Deposit Insurance" (June 23, 2010)
- Financial Times, "Chatter About a New Global Currency is Overblown," (July 29, 2009)
- Forbes, "Stop Pining for Glass-Steagall," (September/October 2009)
- Wall Street Journal, "Systemic Risk and the Fed," (July 9, 2009)
- Wall Street Journal, "How to Value Toxic Bank Assets," (February 3, 2009)
- Financial Times, "Foundations to be Laid Before Bridging Gap," (November 19, 2008)
- New York Times, "Think First, Bail Out Later," (June 15, 2008)
- New York Times, "Reporting for Duty," (March 3, 2007)
- Harvard Business Review, "If Private Equity Sized Up Your Business," (November 2007)
- Fortune, "China Goes from Red to Gray," (June 26, 2006)
- Harvard Business Review, "Before You Split that CEO Chair," (April 2006)
- Pensions & Investments, "Overstating Performance," (February 20, 2006)
- USA Today, "Why My Plan to Fix Social Security Work," (June 13, 2005)
- Foreign Affairs, "Mind the Gap," Vol. 84, No. 2, 8-12 (March/April 2005)
- The Economist, "The Route to Real Pension Reform," 69 (January 8, 2005)
- Harvard Business Review, "Arm Yourself for the Coming Battle Over Social Security," Vol. 80 at 52 (November 2002)
- Harvard Business Review, "Institutional Investors: The Reluctant Activists," Vol. 72 of 140 (January/February 1994)
