= Mutual fund =

Professionally managed investment fund

A mutual fund is an investment fund that pools money from many investors to purchase securities. The term is typically used in the United States, Canada, and India. In Europe, UCITS funds, primarily registered in Luxembourg and Ireland, are considered mutual funds, while similar structures include the SICAV and the open-ended investment company (OEIC) in the UK.

While exchange-traded funds are generally more popular with investors due to their tradability, lower fees, and tax advantages, mutual funds are popular in the U.S. among sponsors of 401(k) plans since open-end funds are priced only at the end of the trading day and fractional shares are easily purchased, making it easy for direct investment from payroll.

Mutual funds are often classified by their principal investments: stock fund, bond fund, money market fund, or hybrid fund. Funds may also be categorized as index funds, which are passively managed funds that track the performance of an index, such as a stock market index or bond market index, or actively managed funds, which seek to outperform stock market indices but generally charge higher fees. The types of securities in which a particular fund may invest in are set forth in the fund's prospectus, a legal document that describes the fund's investment objective, investment approach and permitted investments. The investment objective describes the type of income that the fund seeks.

The primary structures of mutual funds are open-end funds, whereby shares are purchased and sold directly from the issuers at the net asset value, and less commonly, closed-end funds, which are sold on securities exchanges and for which no more shares can be created.

Mutual funds have advantages and disadvantages compared to direct investing in individual securities. The advantages of mutual funds include economies of scale, diversification, market liquidity, and professional investment management.

A mutual fund is technically a mutual organization. It is organized by a management company, which does not own the fund but receives a management fee. Mutual funds are regulated by governmental bodies and are subject to securities laws. Fund managers are required to publish information including performance, comparisons of performance to benchmarks, fees charged, and securities held. A single mutual fund may have several share classes, for which larger investors pay lower fees.

== Market size ==
At the end of 2023, open-end mutual fund assets worldwide were $69.0 trillion. The countries with the largest mutual fund industries are:

1. United States: $38.8 trillion
2. Luxembourg: $5.8 trillion
3. Ireland: $4.5 trillion
4. China: $3.4 trillion
5. Germany: $2.7 trillion
6. Australia: $2.6 trillion
7. France: $2.5 trillion
8. Japan: $2.2 trillion
9. United Kingdom: $2.0 trillion
10. Canada: $1.8 trillion

In the United States, at the end of 2024, 24% of household financial assets were invested in mutual funds. Almost half of U.S. mutual funds assets were held in individual retirement accounts, 401(k) plans, or other defined contribution retirement plans. Mutual funds accounted for 38% of the assets in individual retirement accounts and 60% of the assets in 401(k) plans.

== History ==
=== Early history ===
The first modern investment funds, the precursor of mutual funds, were established in the Dutch Republic. In response to the financial crisis of 1772–1773, Amsterdam-based businessman Abraham (or Adriaan) van Ketwich formed a trust named Eendragt Maakt Magt ("unity creates strength"). His aim was to provide small investors with an opportunity to diversify.

The first investment trust in the UK, the Scottish American Investment Trust formed in 1873, is considered the "most obvious progenitor" of the mutual fund, according to Diana B. Henriques.

One of the earliest investment companies in the U.S. similar to a modern mutual fund was the Boston Personal Property Trust, which was founded in 1893; however, its original intent was as a workaround to Massachusetts law restricting corporate real estate holdings rather than investing. Early U.S. funds were generally closed-end funds with a fixed number of shares that often traded at prices above the portfolio net asset value. The first open-end mutual fund with redeemable shares was established on March 21, 1924, as the Massachusetts Investors Trust, which is still in existence today and managed by MFS Investment Management.

In the U.S., there were nearly six times as many closed-end funds as mutual funds in 1929.

After the Wall Street Crash of 1929, the United States Congress passed a series of acts regulating the securities markets in general and mutual funds in particular.

- The Securities Act of 1933 requires that all investments sold to the public, including mutual funds, be registered with the SEC and that they provide prospective investors with a prospectus that discloses essential facts about the investment.
- The Securities Exchange Act of 1934 requires that issuers of securities, including mutual funds, report regularly to their investors. This act also created the Securities and Exchange Commission, which is the principal regulator of mutual funds.
- The Revenue Act of 1936 established guidelines for the taxation of mutual funds. It allowed mutual funds to be treated as a flow-through or pass-through entity, where income is passed through to investors who are responsible for the tax on that income.
- The Investment Company Act of 1940 established rules specifically governing mutual funds.

These new regulations encouraged the development of open-end mutual funds (as opposed to closed-end funds).

In 1936, U.S. mutual fund industry was nearly half as large as closed-end investment trusts. But mutual funds had grown to twice as large as closed-end funds by 1947; growth would accelerate to ten times as much by 1959. In terms of dollar amounts, mutual funds in the U.S. totaled $2 billion in value in 1950 and about $17 billion in 1960. The introduction of money market funds in the high-interest rate environment of the late 1970s boosted industry growth dramatically.

The first retail index funds appeared in the early 1970s, aiming to capture average market returns rather than doing detailed company-by-company analysis as earlier funds had done. Rex Sinquefield offered the first S&P 500 index fund to the general public starting in 1973, while employed at American National Bank of Chicago. Sinquefield's fund had $12 billion in assets after its first seven years. John "Mac" McQuown also began an index fund in 1973, though it was part of a large pension fund managed by Wells Fargo and not open to the general public. Batterymarch Financial, a small Boston firm then employing Jeremy Grantham, also offered index funds beginning in 1973 but it was such a revolutionary concept they did not have paying customers for over a year. John Bogle was another early pioneer of index funds with the First Index Investment Trust, formed in 1976 by The Vanguard Group; it is now called the "Vanguard 500 Index Fund" and is one of the largest mutual funds.

Beginning the 1980s, the mutual fund industry began a period of growth. According to Robert Pozen and Theresa Hamacher, growth was the result of three factors:

1. A bull market for both stocks and bonds,
2. New product introductions (including funds based on municipal bonds, various industry sectors, international funds, and target date funds) and
3. Wider distribution of fund shares. Among the new distribution channels were retirement plans. Mutual funds are now the a preferred investment option in certain types of retirement plans, specifically in 401(k), other defined contribution plans and in individual retirement accounts (IRAs), all of which surged in popularity in the 1980s.

The 2003 mutual fund scandal involved unequal treatment of fund shareholders whereby some fund management companies allowed favored investors to engage in prohibited late trading or market timing. The scandal was uncovered by former New York Attorney General Eliot Spitzer and led to an increase in regulation.

In a 2007 study about German mutual funds, Johannes Gomolka and Ralf Jasny found statistical evidence of illegal time zone arbitrage in trading of German mutual funds. Though reported to regulators, BaFin never commented on these results.

== Features ==
Like other types of investment funds, mutual funds have advantages and disadvantages compared to alternative structures or investing directly in individual securities. According to Robert Pozen and Theresa Hamacher, these are:

=== Advantages ===
- Increased opportunity for diversification: A fund diversifies by holding many securities. This diversification decreases risk.
- Daily liquidity: In the United States, mutual fund shares can be redeemed for their net asset value within seven days, but in practice the redemption is often much quicker. This liquidity can create asset–liability mismatch which poses challenges, which in part motivated an SEC liquidity management rule in 2016.
- Professional investment management: Open-and closed-end funds hire portfolio managers to supervise the fund's investments.
- Ability to participate in investments that may be available only to larger investors. For example, individual investors often find it difficult to invest directly in foreign markets.
- Service and convenience: Funds often provide services such as check writing.
- Government oversight: Mutual funds are regulated by a governmental body
- Transparency and ease of comparison: All mutual funds are required to report the same information to investors, which makes them easier to compare to each other.

=== Disadvantages ===
Mutual funds have disadvantages as well, which include:

- Fees
- Less control over the timing of recognition of gains
- Less predictable income
- No opportunity to customize
- Purchase and sale only once per day, at uncertain prices
- No intraday trading; no limit orders or shorting
- Potentially more cash drag, as mutual funds must hold more cash to meet redemptions
- Potentially higher taxes
- New investors inherit old tax liabilities
- When some investors join or leave the fund, the costs (both trading costs and stale pricing) are borne by all investors in the fund

Sometimes investors in mutual funds can face tax bills for taxes incurred before they bought into the fund.

John Bogle preferred mutual funds, regarding ETFs as encouraging trading and speculation. He was opposed to ETFs for high-fee actively-managed funds, and noted that many investors failed to capture the full returns of their funds by chasing returns (buying high and selling low).

== Expenses ==
Investors in a mutual fund pay the fund's expenses. Some of these expenses reduce the value of an investor's account; others are paid by the fund and reduce net asset value.

These expenses fall into five categories:

=== Management fee ===
The management fee is paid by the fund to the management company or sponsor that organizes the fund, provides the portfolio management or investment advisory services, and normally lends its brand name to the fund. The fund manager may also provide other administrative services. The management fee often has breakpoints, which means that it declines in percentage as the invested amount (in either the specific fund or in the fund family as a whole) increases. The fund's board reviews the management fee annually. Fund shareholders must vote on any proposed increase, but the fund manager or sponsor can agree to waive some or all of the management fees in order to lower the fund's expense ratio.

Index funds generally charge a lower management fee than actively-managed funds.

=== Distribution charges ===
When these expenses are charged separately, distribution charges pay for marketing, distribution of the fund's shares, and services to investors. There are three types of distribution charges.

- Front-end load or sales charge. A front-end load or sales charge is a commission paid to a broker by a mutual fund when shares are purchased. It is expressed as a percentage of the total amount invested or the "public offering price", which equals the net asset value plus the front-end load per share. The front-end load often declines as the amount invested increases, through breakpoints. The front-end load is paid by the investor; it is deducted from the amount invested.
- Back-end load. Some funds have a back-end load, which is paid by the investor when shares are redeemed. If the back-end load declines the longer the investor holds shares, it is called a contingent deferred sales charge (CDSC). Like the front-end load, the back-end load is paid by the investor; it is deducted from the redemption proceeds.
- Distribution and services fee. Some funds charge an annual fee to compensate the distributor of fund shares for providing ongoing services to fund shareholders. In the United States, this fee is sometimes called a 12b-1 fee, after the SEC rule authorizing it. The distribution and services fee is paid by the fund and reduces net asset value.

Distribution charges generally vary for each share class.

=== Securities transaction fees incurred by the fund ===
A mutual fund pays expenses related to buying or selling the securities in its portfolio. These expenses may include brokerage commissions. These costs are normally positively correlated with turnover.

=== Shareholder transaction fees ===
Shareholders may be required to pay fees for certain transactions, such as buying or selling shares of the fund. A fund may charge a fee for maintaining an individual retirement account for an investor.

Some funds charge redemption fees when an investor sells fund shares shortly after buying them (usually defined as within 30, 60, or 90 days of purchase). Redemption fees are computed as a percentage of the sale amount. Shareholder transaction fees are not part of the expense ratio.

=== Fund services charges ===
A mutual fund may pay for other services including:

- Board of directors or trustees fees and expenses
- Custody fee: paid to a custodian bank for holding the fund's portfolio in safekeeping and collecting income owed on the securities
- Fund administration fee: for overseeing all administrative affairs such as preparing financial statements and shareholder reports, SEC filings, monitoring compliance, computing total returns and other performance information, preparing/filing tax returns and all expenses of maintaining compliance with state blue sky laws
- Fund accounting fee: for performing investment or securities accounting services and computing the net asset value (usually every day the New York Stock Exchange is open)
- Professional services fees: legal and auditing fees
- Registration fees: paid to the SEC and state securities regulators
- Shareholder communications expenses: printing and mailing required documents to shareholders such as shareholder reports and prospectuses
- Transfer agent service fees and expenses: for keeping shareholder records, providing statements and tax forms to investors and providing telephone, internet and or other investor support and servicing
- Other/miscellaneous fees

The fund manager or sponsor may agree to subsidize some of these charges.

=== Expense ratio ===
The expense ratio equals recurring fees and expenses charged to the fund during the year divided by average net assets. The management fee and fund services charges are ordinarily included in the expense ratio. Front-end and back-end loads, securities transaction fees, and shareholder transaction fees are normally excluded.

To facilitate comparisons of expenses, regulators generally require that funds use the same formula to compute the expense ratio and publish the results.

=== Other fees ===
==== Purchase fee ====
Purchase Fee are fees that some funds charge their shareholders when they buy shares. Unlike a front-end sales load, a purchase fee is paid to the fund (not to a Stockbroker) and is typically imposed to defray some of the fund's costs associated with the purchase.

==== Redemption fee ====
Redemption fees are fees that some funds charge their shareholders when they sell or redeem shares. Unlike a deferred sales load, a redemption fee is paid to the fund (not to a Stockbroker) and is typically used to defray fund costs associated with a shareholder's redemption.

==== Exchange fee ====
Exchange fees are fees that some funds impose on shareholders if they exchange (transfer) to another fund within the same "family of funds".

==== Account fee ====
Account fees are fees that some funds separately impose on investors in connection with the maintenance of their accounts. For example, some funds impose an account maintenance fee on accounts whose value is less than a certain dollar amount.

==== Distribution and service fee ====
Distribution and service fees are fees paid by the fund out of fund assets to cover the costs of marketing and selling fund shares and sometimes to cover the costs of providing shareholder services. They are also called 12b-1 fees after section 12 of the Investment Company Act of 1940. "Distribution fees" include fees to compensate brokers and others who sell fund shares and to pay for advertising, the printing and mailing of prospectuses to new investors, and the printing and mailing of sales literature. "Shareholder Service Fees" are fees paid to persons to respond to investor inquiries and provide investors with information about their investments. Shareholder Servicing Fees can be paid inside or outside of a Rule 12b-1 Plan.

Funds can charge up to 0.25% in distribution fees and still describe themselves as "no-load".

=== Loads ===
==== Front-end load ====
Often associated with class 'A' shares of a mutual fund. Also known as Sales Charge, this is a fee paid when shares are purchased. Also known as a "front-end load", this fee typically goes to the brokers that sell the fund's shares. Front-end loads reduce the amount of your investment. For example, let's say you have $1,000 and want to invest it in a mutual fund with a 5% front-end load. The $50 sales load you must pay comes off the top, and the remaining $950 will be invested in the fund. The Maximum sales load under the Investment Company Act of 1940 is 9%. The maximum sales load under NASD Rules is 8 1/2%.

==== Back-end load ====
Associated with class "B" mutual fund shares. Known as a Contingent Deferred Sales Charge (CDSC or sometimes Deferred Sales Charge), this is a fee paid when shares are sold. Also known as a "back-end load", this fee typically goes to the stockbrokers that sell the fund's shares. Back-end loads start with a fee of about 5 to 6 percent, which incrementally discounts for each year that the investors own the fund’s shares. The rate at which the fee declines is disclosed in the prospectus. The amount of this type of load will depend on how long the investor holds his or her shares and typically decreases to zero if the investor holds his or her shares long enough.

==== Level load/low load ====
It's similar to a back-end load in that no sales charges are paid when buying the fund. Instead, a back-end load may be charged if the shares purchased are sold within a given time frame. The distinction between level loads and low loads as opposed to back-end loads is that this time frame where charges are levied is shorter.

==== No-load fund ====
Associated with Class "C" Shares. As the name implies, this means that the fund does not charge any type of sales load. But, as outlined above, not every type of shareholder fee is a "sales load". A no-load fund may charge fees that are not sales loads, such as purchase fees, redemption fees, exchange fees, and account fees. Class "C" shares have the highest annual expense charges.

== Share classes ==
A single mutual fund may give investors a choice of different combinations of front-end loads, back-end loads and distribution and services fees by offering several different types of shares, known as share classes. All of them invest in the same portfolio of securities, but each has different expenses and, therefore, different net asset values and different performance results. Some of these share classes may be available only to certain types of investors.

Typical share classes for funds sold through brokers or other intermediaries in the United States are:

- Class A shares usually charge a front-end sales load together with a small distribution and services fee.
- Class B shares usually do not have a front-end sales load; rather, they have a high contingent deferred sales charge (CDSC) that gradually declines over several years, combined with a high 12b-1 fee. Class B shares usually convert automatically to Class A shares after they have been held for a certain period.
- Class C shares usually have a high distribution and services fee and a modest contingent deferred sales charge that is discontinued after one or two years. Class C shares usually do not convert to another class. They are often called "level load" shares.
- Class I are usually subject to very high minimum investment requirements and are, therefore, known as "institutional" shares. They are no-load shares.
- Class R are usually for use in retirement plans such as 401(k) plans. They typically do not charge loads but do charge a small distribution and services fee.

No-load funds in the United States often have two classes of shares:

- Class I shares do not charge a distribution and services fee
- Class N shares charge a distribution and services fee of no more than 0.25% of fund assets

Neither class of shares typically charges a front-end or back-end load.

== See also ==
- 2003 mutual fund scandal
- Active management
- Asset management
- Collective trust fund
- Fund derivative
- Index fund
- Lipper average
- List of mutual funds in the United States by assets under management
- Money market fund
- Mutual funds in India
