= Wisconsin's 82nd Assembly district =

American legislative district for Waukesha, Wisconsin

Wisconsin's 82nd State Assembly district
- 2024 map defined in 2023 Wisc. Act 94; 2022 map defined in Johnson v. Wisconsin Elections Commission; 2011 map was defined in 2011 Wisc. Act 43
Assemblymember
Scott Allen; R–Waukesha
since January 6, 2025 (1 years)
- Demographics: 80.66% White; 3.5% Black; 10.9% Hispanic; 2.98% Asian; 1.61% Native American; 0.13% Hawaiian/Pacific Islander
- Population (2020) • Voting age: 58,981; 46,251
- Website: Official website
- Notes: Waukesha, Wisconsin

The 82nd Assembly district of Wisconsin is one of 99 districts in the Wisconsin State Assembly. Located in southeast Wisconsin, the district is entirely contained within central Waukesha County, including most of the city of Waukesha and part of the village of Waukesha. The district is represented by Republican Scott Allen, since January 2025; Allen previously represented the 97th district from 2015 to 2025.

The 82nd Assembly district is located within Wisconsin's 28th Senate district, along with the 83rd and 84th Assembly districts.

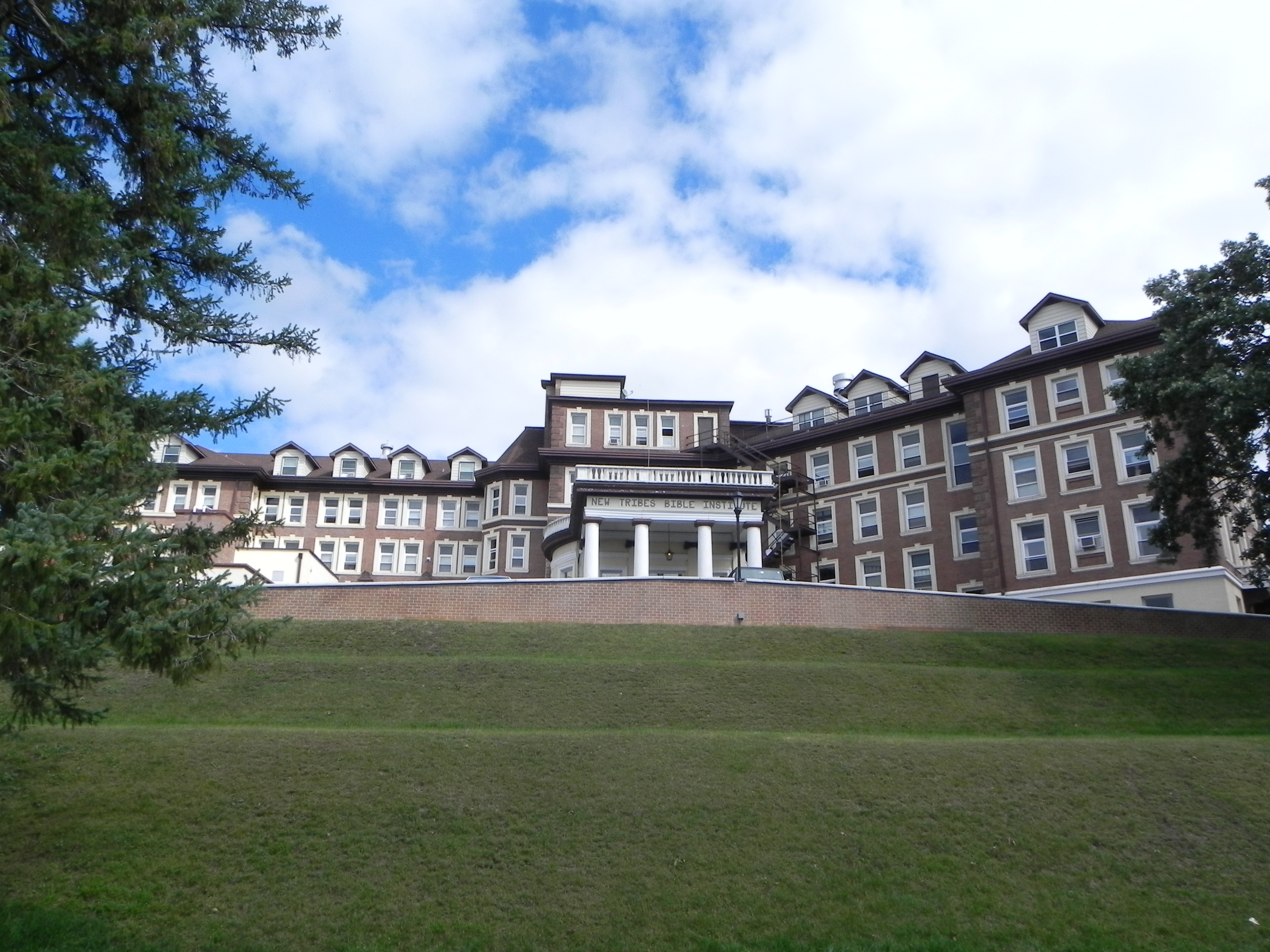
Resthaven Hotel in Waukesha

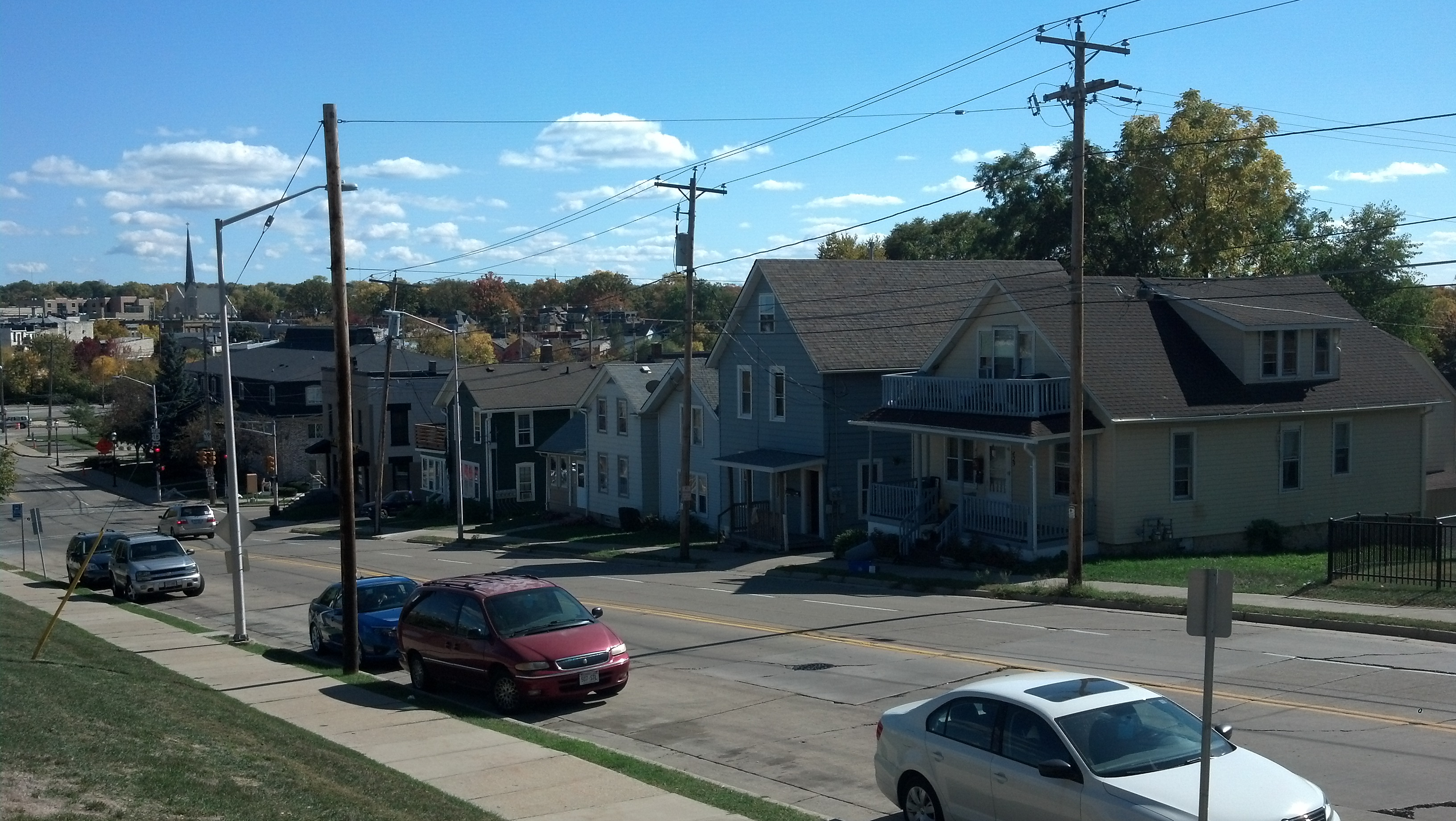
Madison Street Historic District in the city of Waukesha

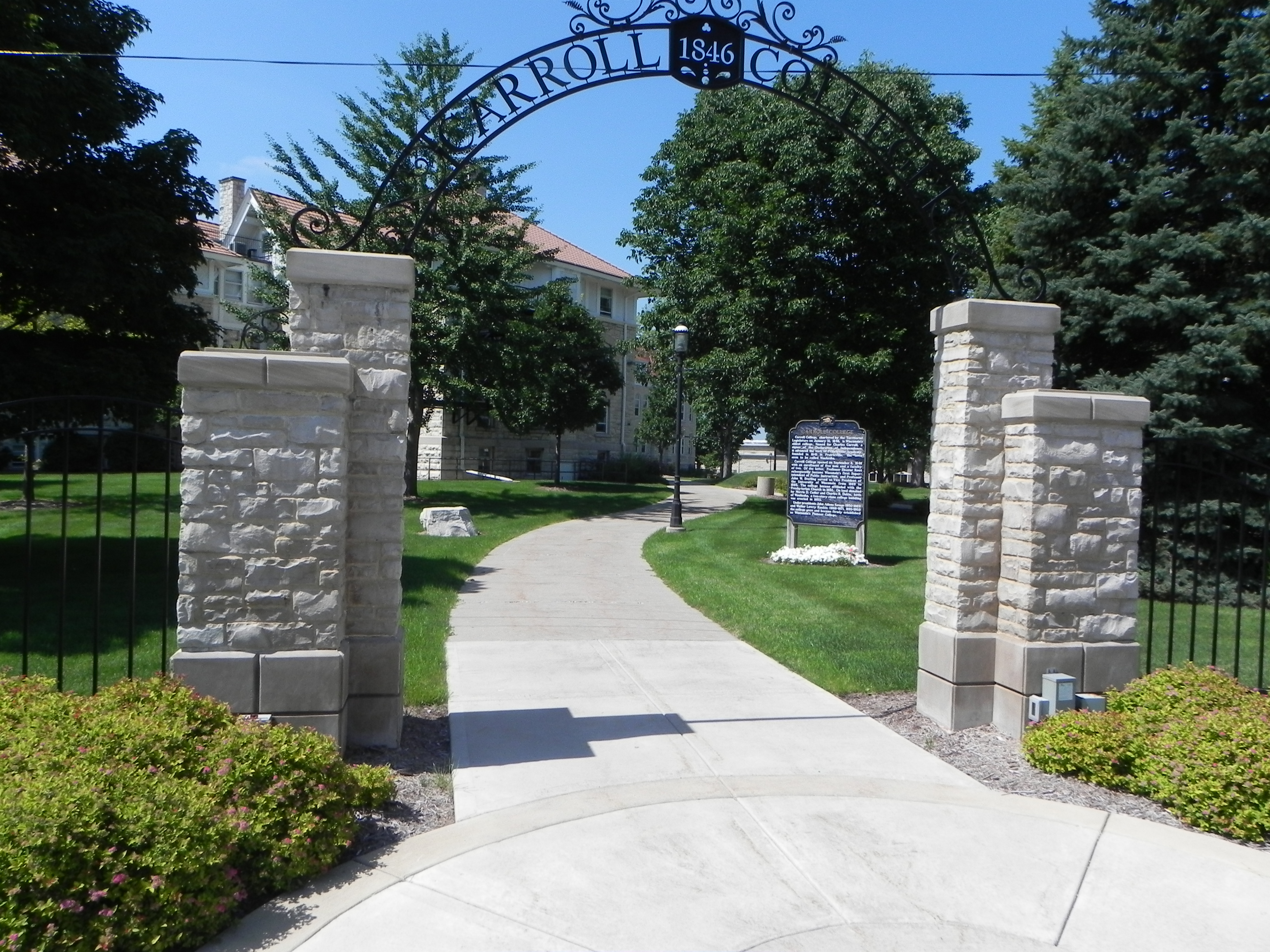
Carroll University

== List of past representatives ==
List of representatives to the Wisconsin State Assembly from the 82nd district
Member	Party	Residence	Counties represented	Term start	Term end	Ref.
District created
James A. Rutkowski	Dem.	Hales Corners	Milwaukee, Waukesha	January 1, 1973	January 3, 1983	
Gervase Hephner	Dem.	Chilton	Calumet, Outagamie	January 3, 1983	January 7, 1985	
James A. Rutkowski	Dem.	Hales Corners	Milwaukee	January 7, 1985	December 7, 1997	
James A. Rutkowski	Dem.	Hales Corners	Milwaukee, Racine	January 7, 1985	December 7, 1997	
--Vacant--			Milwaukee, Racine	December 7, 1997	April 15, 1998	
Jeff A. Stone	Rep.	Greendale	Milwaukee, Racine	April 15, 1998	October 14, 2013	
Jeff A. Stone	Rep.	Greendale	Milwaukee	April 15, 1998	October 14, 2013	
--Vacant--			Milwaukee	October 14, 2013	January 6, 2014	
Ken Skowronski	Rep.	Franklin	Milwaukee	January 6, 2014	January 2, 2023	
Chuck Wichgers	Rep.	Muskego	Milwaukee, Waukesha	January 3, 2023	January 6, 2025	
Scott Allen	Rep.	Waukesha	Waukesha	January 6, 2025	Current	
