= Ron Tusler =

American attorney and politician (born 1984)

Member of the Wisconsin State Assembly from the 3rd district
- Incumbent
- Assumed office January 3, 2017
- Preceded by: Alvin Ott

Personal details
- Born: March 21, 1984 (age 42) Appleton, Wisconsin, U.S.
- Party: Republican
- Spouse: Devon
- Children: Madeline Ann Tusler
- Education: University of Wisconsin-Milwaukee (BA); Marquette University (JD)
- Occupation: Attorney
- Website: Official website Campaign website

Ron W. Tusler (born March 21, 1984) is an American attorney and Republican politician from Calumet County, Wisconsin. He is a member of the Wisconsin State Assembly, representing the 3rd Assembly district since 2017.

== Early life and career ==
From Appleton, Wisconsin, Tusler received his bachelor's degree from University of Wisconsin–Milwaukee and his J.D. degree from Marquette University Law School. He practices law in Appleton and is involved with the Republican Party. Tusler was elected to the Wisconsin State Assembly in 2016. His great grandfather, Gordon A. Bubolz, served in the Wisconsin Senate.

== Wisconsin State Assembly ==
Tusler worked as the Elections Committee chair in November 2020 when Assembly Speaker Robin Vos called for an Assembly committee with subpoena powers to oversee an investigation into potential fraud surrounding alleged “concerns surfacing about mail-in ballot dumps and voter fraud” in Wisconsin. During this time, Vice chair Rep. Joe Sanfelippo (R-New Berlin) said the committee may need to overturn Wisconsin voters’ choice of Joe Biden and conduct a new election or order electors to vote instead to give the state’s 10 Electoral College votes to Donald Trump. Legal experts said either action is beyond the power of the committee and would violate state and federal law. During this time, Tusler did not respond to multiple inquiries about whether Sanfelippo was speaking in his leadership role for the caucus and, if not, whether they agree with the steps he laid out.

== Electoral history ==
=== Wisconsin Assembly (2016–present) ===
Year	Election	Date	Elected				Defeated				Total	Plurality
2016	Primary	Aug. 9	Ron Tusler	Republican	2,589	54.59%	Bradley B. Schinke	Rep.	1,218	25.68%	4,743	1,371
2016	Primary	Aug. 9	Ron Tusler	Republican	2,589	54.59%	Christopher Schaefer	Rep.	739	15.58%	4,743	1,371
2016	Primary	Aug. 9	Ron Tusler	Republican	2,589	54.59%	Josh Young	Rep.	197	4.15%	4,743	1,371
2016	General	Nov. 8	Ron Tusler	Republican	18,361	60.54%	Sharon M. Wasileski	Dem.	11,969	39.46%	30,330	6,392
2018	General	Nov. 6	Ron Tusler (inc)	Republican	15,847	57.37%	Scott Gavin	Dem.	11,775	42.63%	27,624	4,072
2020	General	Nov. 3	Ron Tusler (inc)	Republican	21,316	59.17%	Emily Voight	Dem.	14,703	40.82%	36,023	6,613
2022	General	Nov. 8	Ron Tusler (inc)	Republican	21,179	98.33%	--Unopposed--				21,539	20,819
2024	General	Nov. 5	Ron Tusler (inc)	Republican	23,344	64.47%	Jason J. Schmitz	Dem.	12,839	35.46%	36,211	10,505

Wisconsin State Assembly
Preceded by Alvin Ott	Member of the Wisconsin State Assembly from the 3rd district January 3, 2017 – present	Incumbent
