= Alvin Ott =

American politician

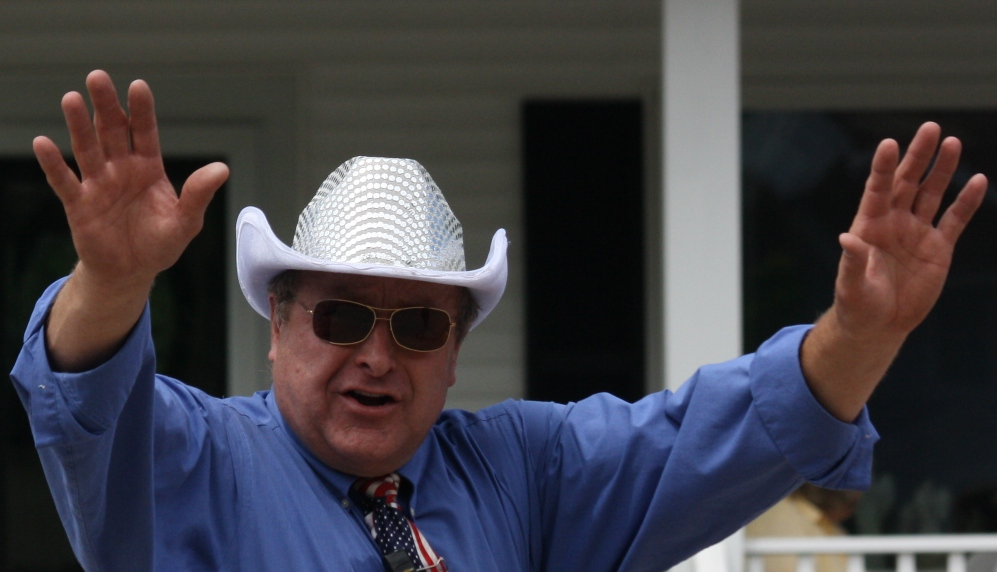

Member of the Wisconsin State Assembly from the 3rd district
- In office January 5, 1987 – January 3, 2017
- Preceded by: Gervase Hephner
- Succeeded by: Ron Tusler

Personal details
- Born: June 19, 1949 (age 77) Green Bay, Wisconsin, U.S.
- Party: Republican
- Spouse: Connie
- Children: 4
- Education: University of Wisconsin–Madison
- Profession: Farmer

Alvin "Al" Ott (born June 19, 1949) is a retired American farmer and Republican politician from Calumet County, Wisconsin. He served 30 years in the Wisconsin State Assembly, representing the 3rd Assembly district from 1987 to 2017.

== Biography ==
Alvin Ott was born in Green Bay, Wisconsin, in June 1949. He was raised in the town of Brillion, Wisconsin, and graduated from Brillion High School. He went on to attend the University of Wisconsin–Madison Farm and Industry Short Course, completing his studies in 1968.

He was elected to the Wisconsin State Assembly in 1986, and was subsequently re-elected 14 times. For nearly his entire legislative service, he was a member of the Assembly Committee on Agriculture, and served as chairman from 1995 until 2009.

Ott announced in the summer of 2016 that he would not run for re-election that year and would retire after 30 years in office.

Wisconsin State Assembly
Preceded by Gervase Hephner	Member of the Wisconsin State Assembly from the 3rd district January 5, 1987 – January 3, 2017	Succeeded by Ron Tusler
