= Wisconsin's 3rd Assembly district =

American legislative district in Calumet County and Manitowoc County, Wisconsin

Wisconsin's 3rd State Assembly district
- 2024 map defined in 2023 Wisc. Act 94; 2022 map defined in Johnson v. Wisconsin Elections Commission; 2011 map was defined in 2011 Wisc. Act 43
Assemblymember
Ron Tusler; R–Appleton
since January 3, 2017 (9 years, 290 days)
- Demographics: 90.83% White; 0.9% Black; 4.1% Hispanic; 2.2% Asian; 1.48% Native American; 0.09% Hawaiian/Pacific Islander
- Population (2020) • Voting age: 59,173; 44,983
- Website: Official website
- Notes: Northeast Wisconsin

The 3rd Assembly district of Wisconsin is one of 99 districts in the Wisconsin State Assembly. Located in northeast Wisconsin, the district comprises nearly all of Calumet County, and parts of western Manitowoc County. It includes the cities of Brillion, Chilton, and New Holstein, and the parts of Appleton and Menasha which fall within Calumet County. It also contains the villages of Hilbert, Potter, Sherwood, Stockbridge, St. Nazianz, Valders, and Whitelaw. The district is represented by Republican Ron Tusler, since January 2017.

The 3rd Assembly district is located within Wisconsin's 1st Senate district, along with the 1st and 2nd Assembly districts.

== History ==
The district was created in the 1972 redistricting act (1971 Wisc. Act 304) which first established the numbered district system, replacing the previous system which allocated districts to specific counties. The 3rd district was drawn mostly in line with the previous Manitowoc County 2nd district, but exchanged towns in southern Manitowoc for towns in southeastern Brown County, which previously made up the southern half of the Brown County 2nd district. The last representative of the Manitowoc 2nd district, Everett E. Bolle, went on to win the first election to represent the 3rd Assembly district.

The boundaries of the 3rd district have changed significantly over the various redistricting laws passed since 1972. The 1982 court-ordered redistricting, which completely scrambled State Assembly districts, moved the 3rd district to southeast Milwaukee County for the 1983–1984 session. The 1983 redistricting act restored the district closer to its previous location, but located it almost entirely in Calumet County. The 1992 court-ordered redistricting added more of southern Brown County and northern Fond du Lac County to the district and removed areas of southeastern Outagamie County. The 2002 court-ordered redistricting plan removed towns of Fond du Lac and southern Calumet, and added back areas of southeastern Outagamie County. The district only changed slightly in the 2011 redistricting act (2011 Wisc. Act 43), removing the remaining towns of Brown County from the district. The 2022 court-ordered redistricting shifted the district further west, adding part of Manitowoc County and shedding towns along the east shore of Lake Winnebago. The 2024 redistricting act restored nearly all of Calumet County to the district (excluding only the part of the city of Kiel that crosses into Calumet County), removed all territory in Outagamie County, and added more of rural western Manitowoc County.

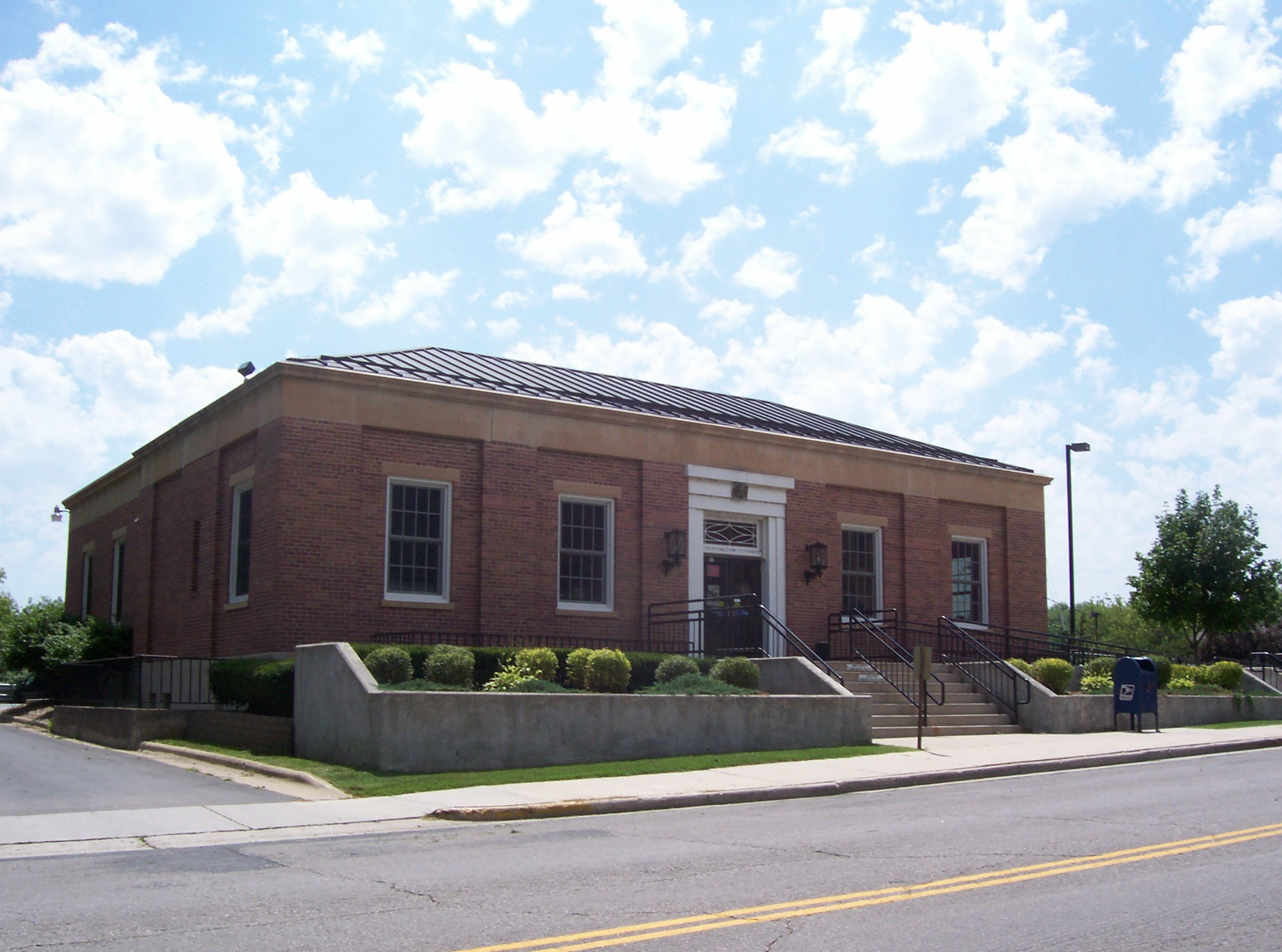
Chilton Post Office

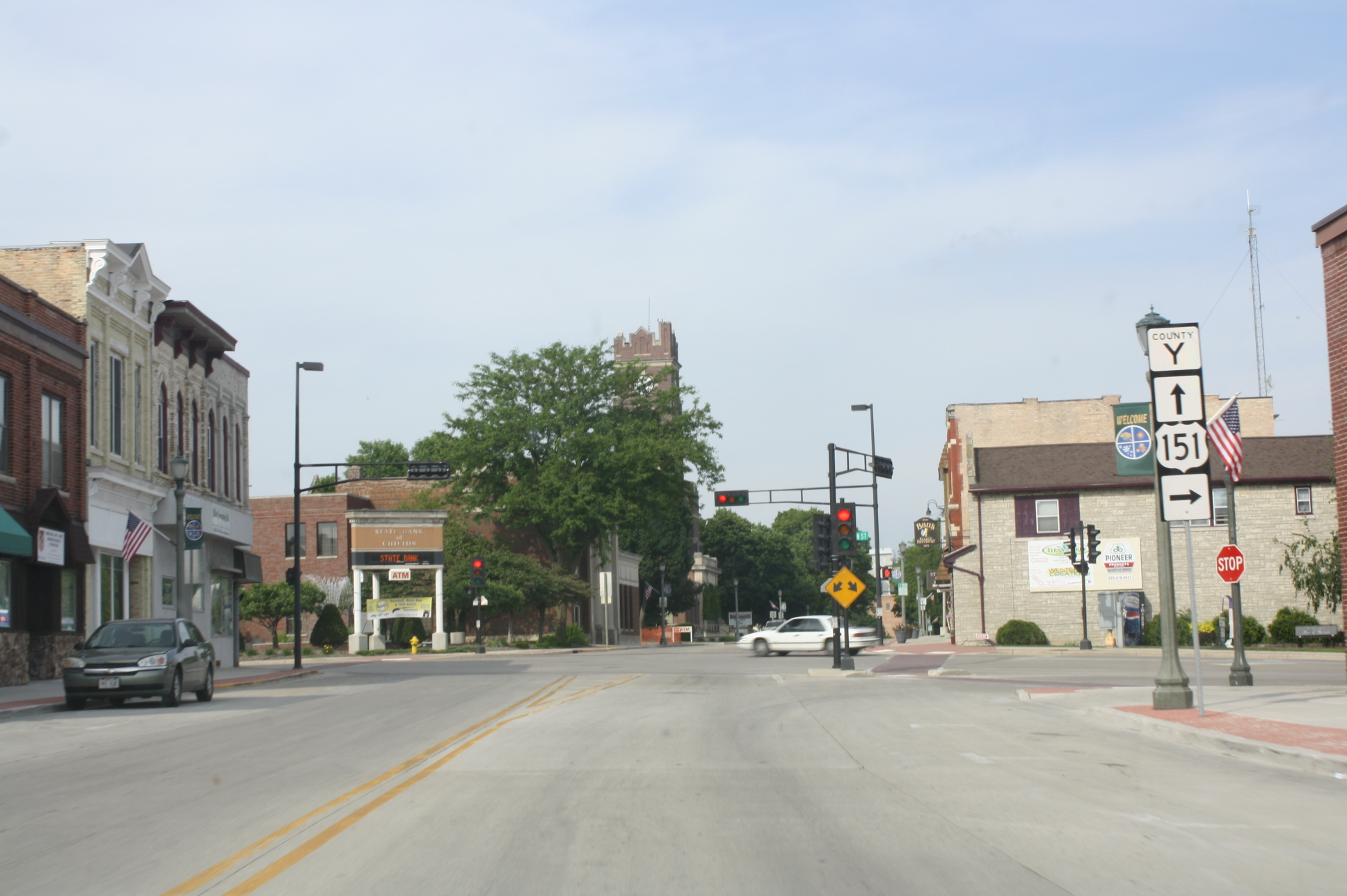
Uptown Chilton, Wisconsin

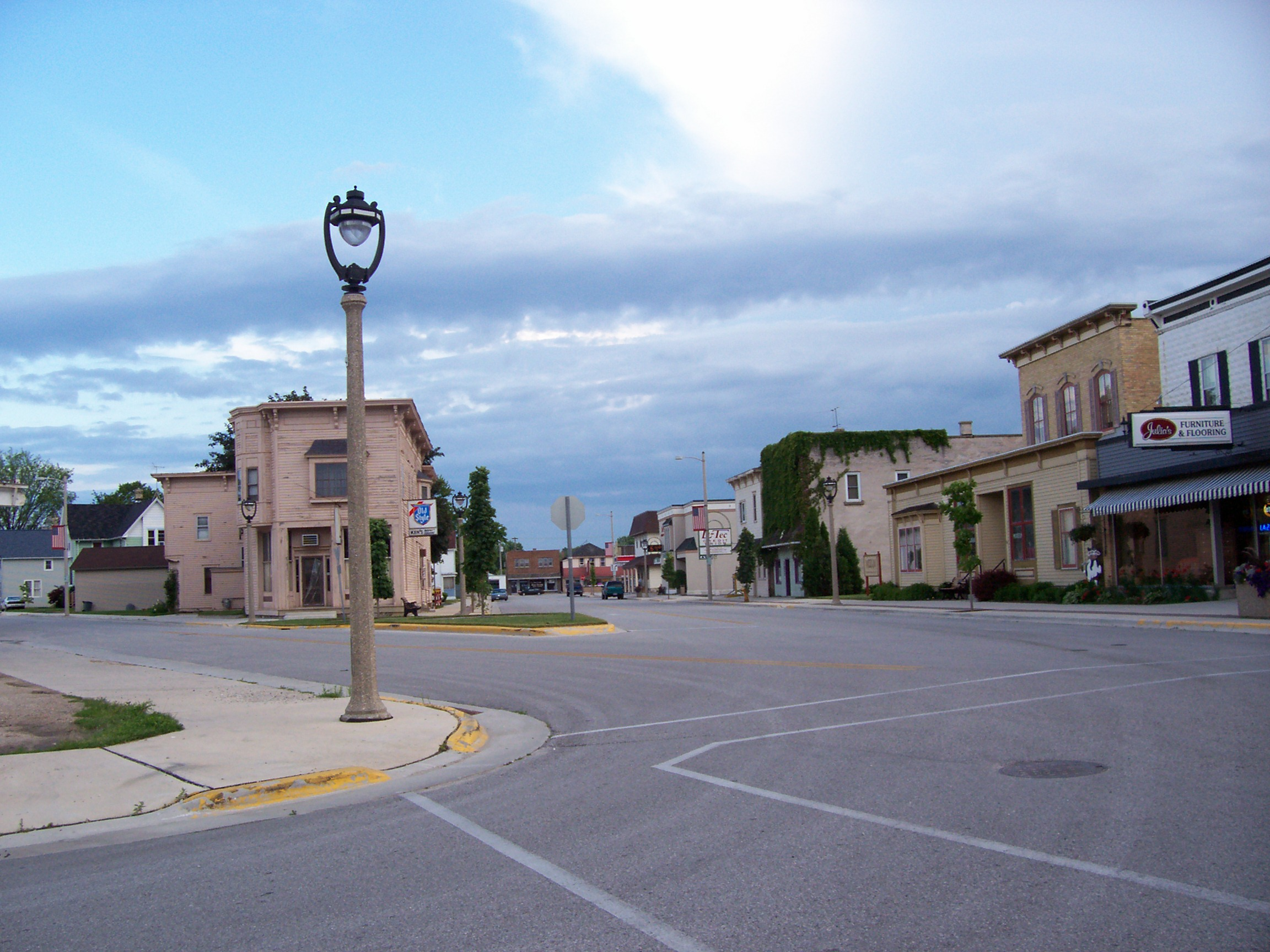
Downtown New Holstein

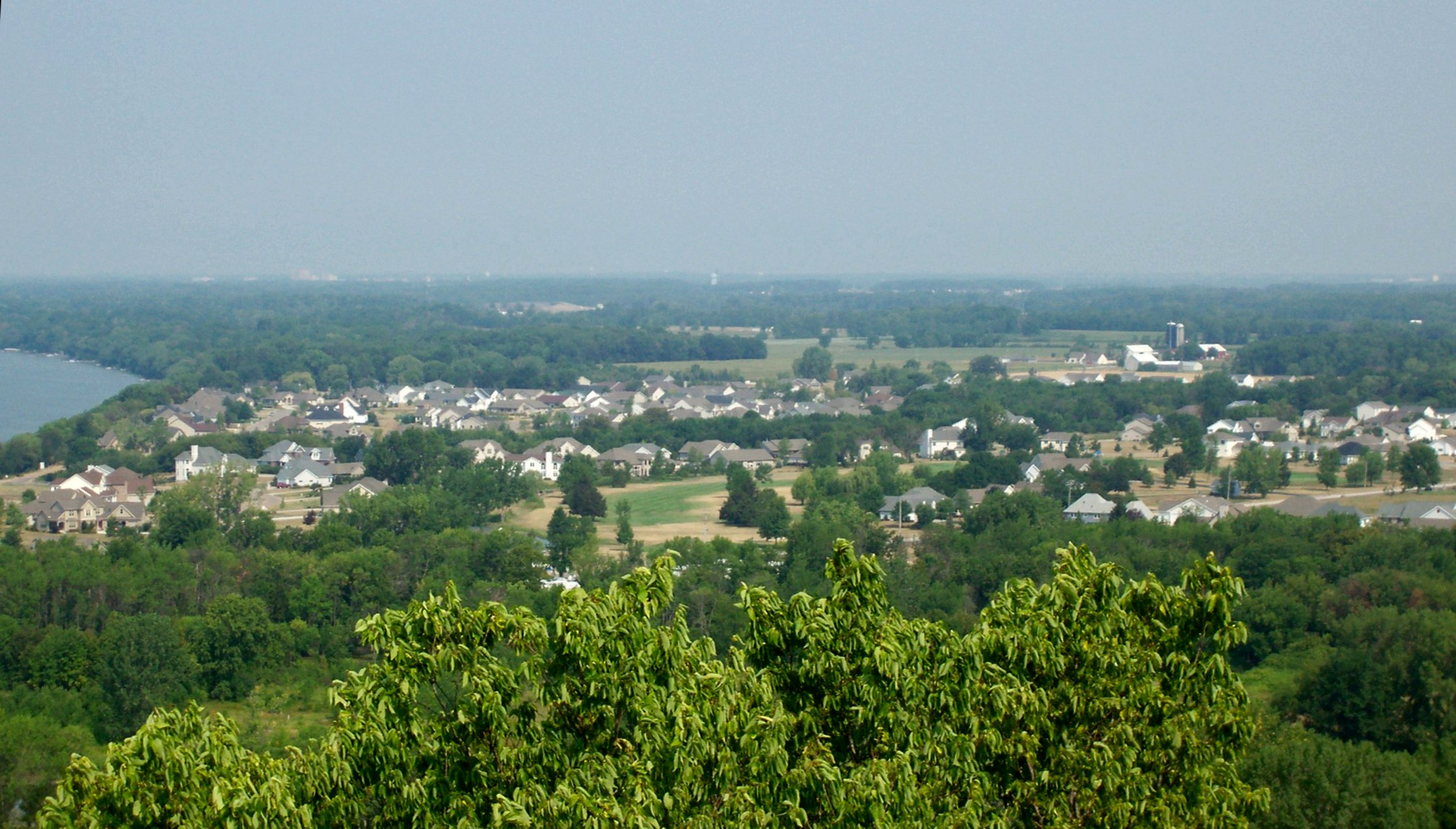
Sherwood viewed from High Cliff State Park

== List of past representatives ==
List of representatives to the Wisconsin State Assembly from the 3rd district
Member	Party	Residence	Counties represented	Term start	Term end	Ref.
District Created
Everett E. Bolle	Dem.	Francis Creek	Brown, Manitowoc	January 1, 1973	January 6, 1975	
Alan Lasee	Rep.	De Pere	Brown, Manitowoc	January 6, 1975	January 3, 1977	
Daniel Fischer	Dem.	Whitelaw	Brown, Manitowoc	January 3, 1977	January 3, 1983	
Chester A. Gerlach	Dem.	South Milwaukee	Milwaukee	January 3, 1983	January 7, 1985	
Gervase A. Hephner	Dem.	Chilton	Calumet, Fond du Lac, Outagamie	January 7, 1985	January 5, 1987	
Alvin Ott	Rep.	Forest Junction	Calumet, Fond du Lac, Outagamie	January 5, 1987	January 3, 2017	
Alvin Ott	Rep.	Forest Junction	Brown, Calumet, Fond du Lac, Outagamie	January 5, 1987	January 3, 2017	
Alvin Ott	Rep.	Forest Junction	Calumet, Outagamie	January 5, 1987	January 3, 2017	
Ron Tusler	Rep.	Appleton	Calumet, Outagamie	January 3, 2017	Current	
Ron Tusler	Rep.	Appleton	Calumet, Outagamie, Manitowoc	January 3, 2017	Current	
Ron Tusler	Rep.	Appleton	Calumet, Manitowoc	January 3, 2017	Current	
