= Mark Honadel =

American politician

Member of the Wisconsin State Assembly from the 21st district
- In office August 4, 2003 – September 18, 2013
- Preceded by: Jeffrey Plale
- Succeeded by: Jessie Rodriguez

Personal details
- Born: March 29, 1956 (age 70) Milwaukee, Wisconsin
- Party: Republican
- Profession: Politician

Mark R. Honadel (born March 29, 1956) is an American welder and independent businessman, a former professional metal fabricator, welding instructor, industrial manager, and was a Republican politician and legislator in Wisconsin.

Born in Milwaukee, Wisconsin, Honadel was raised in Oak Creek, Wisconsin, and graduated from Oak Creek High School in 1974. He attended Milwaukee Area Technical College and Marquette University.

Honadel was elected to the Wisconsin State Assembly in July 2003 in a special election, and was re-elected in 2004, 2006, 2008, 2010 and 2012. He represented South Milwaukee and surrounding areas. Honadel served as Majority Caucus Chairperson in 2007. In 2013 Honadel resigned from the Assembly for an undisclosed job in the private sector. His position was filled by a special election, won by Republican Jessie Rodriguez, on November 19, 2013.
