= Late trading =

Trading after markets close

Late trading is trading that executes after the market closes, while charging the share price of when the market was still open. This form of trading may be illegal, and is distinct from official after-hours trading.

== Mutual funds ==
In the mutual fund context, late trading involves placing orders for mutual fund shares after the close of the stock market, 4:00 p.m for the New York Stock Exchange, but still getting that day's closing price, rather than the next day's opening price. The price of mutual funds is usually set only once per day, so intraday prices are not applicable.

== Controversy ==
In the United States this practice is illegal under SEC rules but many mutual fund managers appear to have allowed exceptions for certain hedge funds and other favored investors who were able to obtain that day's price, notwithstanding that their orders were received after-hours.

== See also ==
- 2003 mutual fund scandal
