= 2003 mutual fund scandal =

2003 financial scandal

The 2003 mutual fund scandal was the result of the discovery of illegal late trading and market timing practices on the part of certain hedge fund and mutual fund companies.

== Spitzer investigation ==
On September 3, 2003, New York Attorney General Eliot Spitzer announced the issuance of a complaint against New Jersey hedge fund company Canary Capital Partners LLC, charging that they had engaged in "late trading" in collusion with Bank of America's Nations Funds. Bank of America is charged with permitting Canary to purchase mutual fund shares, after the markets had closed, at the closing price for that day. Spitzer's investigation was initiated after his office received a ten-minute June 2003 phone call from a Wall Street worker alerting them to an instance of the late trading problem.

Canary Capital settled the complaint for US$40 million, while neither admitting nor denying guilt in the matter. Bank of America stated that it would compensate its mutual fund shareholders for losses incurred by way of the illegal transactions.

=== "Late trading" ===
In the United States, mutual fund prices are set once daily at 4:00 p.m. Eastern time. "Late trading" occurs when traders are allowed to purchase fund shares after 4:00 p.m. at that day's closing price. Under law, most mutual fund trades received after 4:00 p.m. must be executed at the following day's closing price, but because some orders placed before 4:00 p.m. cannot be executed until after 4:00 p.m., brokers can collude with investors and submit post-4:00 p.m. trades as if they had been placed before 4:00 p.m. In 2003 several mutual fund companies and stock brokerage firms engaged in a trading practice which guaranteed profits for the stock brokerage firm’s insider managers and preferred customers.

To understand how this works, one needs to know how mutual funds shares are priced. Share values for mutual funds are not based upon bids from outside buyers. The price of a fund’s price was set in the evening based upon the value of the securities that it owned at the end of trading day, 4:00 PM Eastern Time. The law prohibited trading of mutual fund shares at any other price so the price set on Monday evening for a fund’s shares was available to anybody all day long on Tuesday until the market closed at 4:00 PM.

Pension funds and hedge funds are faced with unpredictable big inflows of cash on any given day. Their job is to put those funds to work as soon as possible.

Mutual funds were eager to take the money from these pension funds. The mutual fund’s management fees were based upon the amount of money (value of shares) held by the fund. More money held by the mutual fund meant more money at the end of the quarter for the fund’s managers. Pension managers had a legitimate problem with knowing just how much money they had to invest on any given day. There are changes from day to day as beneficiaries took withdrawals or employers made deposits.

An ostensibly harmless practice developed where mutual funds let it be known that they could be flexible about taking purchases at that day’s price after the closing, even though that was prohibited by their rules and exposed the fund's shareholders to abuse. This was a matter of accommodating pension managers and encouraging them to invest in that fund.

People were beginning to realize unanticipated uses for computer technology, in particular people realized they could track what was happening to the value of any mutual fund’s investments as quickly or even quicker than the mutual fund managers could using relatively simple spreadsheet programs. They realized that if permitted to buy after the close they could know what tomorrow’s price would be and provided they sold the shares tomorrow morning that they bought that evening would be guaranteed a profit, a profit that ordinary customers that played by the rules could not get and would be gained at a cost to the fund's other shareholders. The trades involved small variances in price but because the buyers were purchasing millions of dollars in mutual fund shares the guaranteed profits for these insiders was significant and secure.

Such trades could be made with information about after-hours market developments in other countries, for example. Traders would buy in at the previous day's close, and sell at the next day's close for a likely profit. This practice hurt long-term buy-and-hold investors in the mutual fund, who experienced a continued drain in the fund's net asset value (or NAV).

Late trading was not a new phenomenon. Prior to 1968, most mutual funds used "backward pricing," in which the fund could be bought at the previous closing price. Thus, traders could purchase mutual funds on a day when the market was up, at the previous day's lower closing price, and then sell at the purchase date's closing price for a guaranteed profit. To prevent the exploitation of backward pricing, the SEC issued Rule 22c-1, requiring forward pricing of mutual fund transactions. This rule was enforced by randomly checking timestamps on orders, but intentional falsification of timestamps was difficult to catch. In addition, New York's Martin Act can be interpreted to prohibit late trading as well, due to the unfair advantage the late trader gains over other traders.

=== "Market timing" ===
Spitzer and later the U.S. Securities and Exchange Commission (SEC) also charged that major mutual fund groups such as Janus, Bank One's One Group, and Strong Capital Management and others facilitated "market timing" trading for favored clients.

Market timing is an investment strategy in which an investor tries to profit from short-term market cycles by trading into and out of market sectors as they heat up and cool off. In a novel interpretation of New York's Martin Act, Spitzer contended that fund firms committed fraud when they allowed some clients to trade more frequently than allowed in their fund documents and prospectus.

In many cases, funds bar or limit frequent trading because the practice may increase the cost of administering a mutual fund borne by all shareholders in the fund. Market timers also can make managing the fund more difficult since the fund may need to keep extra cash to meet liquidity demands of selling timers, although if timers are trading opposite flows of other investors, they can moderate cash fluctuations. Those funds that did not limit frequent trading in their prospectus—as well as a small number of funds that cater specifically to market timers—were not charged.

Spitzer contended that some advisors allowed market timers in order to increase their assets under management (fund advisors are paid based on the amount of assets in the fund).

== SEC investigation ==
The SEC is charged with the regulation of the mutual fund industry in the United States. Following the announcement of Spitzer's complaint, the SEC launched its own investigation of the matter which revealed the practice of "front running". The SEC claimed that certain mutual fund companies alerted favored customers or partners when one or more of a company's funds planned to buy or sell a large stock position. The partner was then in a position to trade shares of the stock in advance of the fund's trading. Since mutual funds tend to hold large positions in specific stocks, any large selling or buying by the fund often impacts the value of the stock, from which the partner could stand to benefit. According to the SEC, the practice of front-running may constitute insider trading.

By early November, investigations led to the resignation of the chairmen of Strong Mutual Funds and Putnam Investments, both major mutual fund companies. In the case of Strong, the chairman Richard Strong was charged with market-timing trading involving his own company's funds. In December, Invesco (market-timing) and Prudential Securities (widespread late trading) were added to the list of implicated fund companies.

== Settlements and trials ==
Nearly all of the fund firms charged by Spitzer with allowing market timing or late trading had settled with his office and the SEC between mid-2004 and mid-2005.

One exception was J. W. Seligman, which chose in September 2005 to sue Spitzer in Federal court after their talks with Spitzer broke down. Seligman argued in its suit that Spitzer had overstepped his authority by attempting to oversee how Seligman's funds set their advisory fee and that the regulatory oversight of fees is left by Congress to the SEC. Separately, in August 2005 Spitzer lost the only trial arising from his investigations when a jury could not reach a verdict on all counts in a case brought against Theodore Sihpol, III, a broker with Bank of America who introduced Canary Capital to the bank. Though Spitzer threatened to retry Sihpol, he did not do so. In September 2005 Spitzer's office reached a plea bargain in a case brought against three executives charged with fraud for financing Canary and assisting its improper trading in mutual funds. That case against two Security Trust executives and one banker had appeared to be Spitzer's strongest, and the settlement seemed to reflect Spitzer's weakening hand in the wake of his defeat in the Sihpol case. The United States Second Circuit reversed the District Court In United States Security Commission v O`Malley on 19 May 2014 finding there was no consistent rule prohibiting Traders from engaging in market timing and therefore there was no requirement to disgorge profits made thereunder. This appeal related to a Rule 50 motion to dismiss on basis there was no credible evidence to leave to the jury as to breaching any duty of care and the Appeals Court Upheld same.

== List of implicated fund companies ==
- Alliance Capital
- Bear Stearns
- Bank One
- Canary Capital Partners
- Columbia Management Advisors
- Deutsche Bank
- Edward Jones Investments
- Federated Investors
- Franklin Templeton
- Fred Alger Management
- Fremont Group
- Goldman Sachs
- Invesco
- Janus Capital Group
- Marsh & McLennan Companies
- Morgan Stanley
- MFS Investment Management
- Nations Funds (Bank of America)
- Pilgrim Baxter (PBHG)
- PIMCO
- Prudential Securities
- Putnam Investments
- RS Investments
- Seligman
- Strong Capital Management
- Wachovia
- Waddell & Reed

== Timeline ==
- On April 28, 2003, every major US investment bank, including Merrill Lynch, Goldman Sachs, Morgan Stanley, Citigroup, Credit Suisse First Boston, Lehman Brothers Holdings, J.P. Morgan Chase, UBS Warburg, and U.S. Bancorp Piper Jaffray, were found to have aided and abetted efforts to defraud investors. The firms were fined a total of $1.4 billion by the SEC, triggering the creation of a Global Research Analyst Settlement Fund.
- In May, 2003, the SEC disclosed that several “brokerage firms paid rivals that agreed to publish positive reports on companies whose shares..they issued to the public. This practice made it appear that a throng of believers were recommending these companies' shares.” This was false. “From 1999 through 2001, for example, one firm paid about $2.7 million to approximately 25 other investment banks for these so-called research guarantees, regulators said. Nevertheless, the same firm boasted in its annual report to shareholders that it had come through investigations of analyst conflicts of interest with its ‘reputation for integrity’ maintained.”
- On September 3, 2003, the New York State Attorney General announced he had “obtained evidence of widespread illegal trading schemes, ‘late trading’ and ‘market timing,’ that potentially cost mutual fund shareholders billions of dollars annually. This, according to the Attorney General, was "like allowing betting on a horse race after the horses have crossed the finish line.”
- On September 4, 2003, a major investment bank, Goldman Sachs, admitted that it had violated anti-fraud laws. Specifically, the firm misused material, nonpublic information that the US Treasury would suspend issuance of the 30-year bond. The firm agreed to “pay over $9.3 million in penalties.” On April 28, 2003, the same firm was found to have “issued research reports that were not based on principles of fair dealing and good faith .. contained exaggerated or unwarranted claims.. and/or contained opinions for which there were no reasonable bases.” The firm was fined $110 million (for a total of $119.3 million in fines in six months).
- On September 17, 2003, New York Stock Exchange chairman Richard Grasso resigns in the aftermath of the scandal of a $140 million package.
- On October 28, 2003, the SEC filed enforcement actions against Putnam Investments and two portfolio managers alleging that they portfolio managers were market timing in funds that they managed.
- On November 20, 2003, the SEC announced “charges concerning undisclosed market timing against Harold J. Baxter and Gary L. Pilgrim in the Commissions’ pending action in federal district court in Philadelphia.” In a later settlement, Baxter and Pilgrim agreed to “pay $80 million – $60 million in disgorgement and $20 million in civil penalties.”
- On December 3, 2003, the SEC proposed new rules to stop after-hours trading in mutual funds.
- On December 18, 2003, the SEC “announced an enforcement action against Alliance Capital Management L.P. (Alliance Capital) for defrauding mutual fund investors. The SEC ordered Alliance Capital to pay $250 million. The SEC also ordered Alliance Capital to undertake certain compliance and fund governance reforms designed to prevent a recurrence of the kind of conduct described in the Commission's Order. Finally, the SEC found that “Alliance Capital breached its fiduciary duty to (its) funds and misled those who invested in them.”
- On October 8, 2004, the SEC “announced..enforcement actions against Invesco Funds Group, Inc. (IFG), AIM Advisors, Inc. (AIM Advisors), and AIM Distributors, Inc. (ADI). The Commission issued an order finding that IFG, AIM Advisors, and ADI violated the federal securities laws by facilitating widespread market timing trading in mutual funds with which each entity was affiliated. The settlements require IFG to pay $215 million in disgorgement and $110 million in civil penalties, and require AIM Advisors and ADI to pay, jointly and severally, $20 million in disgorgement and an aggregate $30 million in civil penalties.”
- On November 4, 2004, the SEC “filed a settled civil action in the United States District Court for the District of Columbia against Wachovia Corporation (Wachovia) for violations of proxy disclosure and other reporting requirements in connection with the 2001 merger between First Union Corporation (First Union) and Old Wachovia Corporation (Old Wachovia). Under the settlement, Wachovia must pay a $37 million penalty and is to be enjoined from future violations of the federal securities laws.”
- On November 30, 2004, the SEC announced “the filing..of charges against American International Group, Inc. (AIG) arising out of AIG’s offer and sale of an earnings management product.” The company “agreed to pay a total of $126 million, consisting of a penalty of $80 million, and disgorgement and prejudgment interest of $46 million.”
- On December 22, 2004, “the SEC, NASD and the New York Stock Exchange announced..enforcement proceedings against Edward D. Jones & Co., L.P., a registered broker-dealer headquartered in St. Louis, Missouri.” According to the announcement, “Edward Jones failed to adequately disclose revenue sharing payments that it received from a select group of mutual fund families that Edward Jones recommended to its customers.” The company agreed to “pay $75 million in disgorgement and civil penalties. All of that money will be placed in a Fair Fund for distribution to Edward Jones customers.”
- On January 25, 2005, “the SEC announced the filing in federal district court of separate settled civil injunctive actions against Morgan Stanley & Co. Incorporated (Morgan Stanley) and Goldman, Sachs & Co. (Goldman Sachs) relating to the firms' allocations of stock to institutional customers in initial public offerings (IPOs) underwritten by the firms during 1999 and 2000.”
- According to the Associated Press, on January 31, 2005, “the nation’s largest insurance brokerage company, Marsh & McLennan Companies Inc., based in New York, will pay $850 million to policyholders hurt by” corporate practices that included “bid rigging, price fixing and the use of hidden incentive fees.” The company will issue a public apology calling its conduct "unlawful" and "shameful," according to New York State Attorney General Eliot Spitzer. In addition, “the company will publicly promise to adopt reforms.”
- On Feb. 9, 2005, the SEC “announced the settlement of an enforcement action against Columbia Management Advisors, Inc. (Columbia Advisors), Columbia Funds Distributor, Inc. (Columbia Distributor), and three former Columbia executives in connection with undisclosed market timing arrangements in the Columbia funds. In settling the matter, the Columbia entities will pay $140 million, all of which will be distributed to investors harmed by the conduct. The SEC also brought fraud charges against two additional former Columbia senior executives in federal court in Boston.”
- On March 23, 2005, the SEC “announced that Putnam Investment Management, LLC (Putnam) will pay $40 million. The Commission issued an order that finds Putnam failed to adequately disclose to the Putnam Funds' Board of Trustees and the Putnam Funds' shareholders the conflicts of interest that arose from..arrangements for increased visibility within the broker-dealers' distribution systems.”
- On March 23, 2005, the SEC “announced that it instituted and simultaneously settled an enforcement action against Citigroup Global Markets, Inc. (CGMI) for failing to provide customers with important information relating to their purchases of mutual fund shares.”
- On April 19, 2005, the SEC “announced that KPMG LLP has agreed to settle the SEC's charges against it in connection with the audits of Xerox Corp. from 1997 through 2000.” As part of the settlement, KPMG paid a fine totaling $22.475 million.
- On April 12, 2005, the SEC “instituted and simultaneously settled an enforcement action against the New York Stock Exchange, Inc., finding that the NYSE, over the course of nearly four years, failed to police specialists, who engaged in widespread and unlawful proprietary trading on the floor of the NYSE.” As part of the settlement, the “NYSE agreed to an undertaking of $20 million to fund regulatory audits of the NYSE's regulatory program every two years through the year 2011.” On that same date, the Commission “instituted administrative and cease-and-desist proceedings against 20 former New York Stock Exchange specialists for fraudulent and other improper trading practices.”
- On April 19, 2005, the SEC announced “that KPMG LLP has agreed to settle the SEC's charges against it in connection with the audits of Xerox Corp. from 1997 through 2000. As part of the settlement, KPMG consented to the entry of a final judgment in the SEC's civil litigation against it pending in the U.S. District Court for the Southern District of New York. The final judgment..orders KPMG to pay disgorgement of $9.8 million (representing its audit fees for the 1997-2000 Xerox audits), prejudgment interest thereon in the amount of $2.675 million, and a $10 million civil penalty, for a total payment of $22.475 million.”
- On April 28, 2005, the SEC announced “that it has instituted settled enforcement proceedings against Tyson Foods, Inc. and its former Chairman and CEO Donald "Don" Tyson. The SEC charged that in proxy statements filed with the Commission from 1997 to 2003, Tyson Foods made misleading disclosures of perquisites and personal benefits provided to Don Tyson both prior to and after his retirement as senior chairman in October 2001.”
- On May 31, 2005, the SEC “announced settled fraud charges against two subsidiaries of Citigroup, Inc. relating to the creation and operation of an affiliated transfer agent that has served the Smith Barney family of mutual funds since 1999. Under the settlement, the respondents are ordered to pay $208 million in disgorgement and penalties and to comply with substantial remedial measures, including an undertaking to put out for competitive bidding certain contracts for transfer agency services for the mutual funds.”
- On June 2, 2005, the SEC “filed securities fraud charges against Amerindo Investment Advisors, Inc., Alberto William Vilar and Gary Alan Tanaka, Amerindo’s co-founders and principals, for misappropriating at least $5 million from an Amerindo client.”
- On June 9, 2005, the SEC announced that “Roys Poyiadjis, a former CEO of AremisSoft Corporation, which was a software company with offices in New Jersey, London, Cyprus, and India, agreed to final resolution of fraud charges brought against him by the SEC in October 2001. In documents filed with the federal district court in Manhattan, Poyiadjis consented to disgorge approximately $200 million of unlawful profit from his trading in AremisSoft stock—among the largest recoveries the SEC has obtained from an individual.”
- On July 20, 2005, the SEC “announced a settled administrative proceeding against Canadian Imperial Bank of Commerce's (CIBC) broker-dealer and financing subsidiaries for their role in facilitating deceptive market timing and late trading of mutual funds by certain customers. The Commission ordered the subsidiaries, CIBC World Markets Corp. (World Markets), a New York based broker-dealer, and Canadian Imperial Holdings Inc. (CIHI), to pay $125 million, consisting of $100 million in disgorgement and $25 million in penalties.”
- On August 15, 2005, the SEC “charged four brokers and a day trader with cheating investors through a fraudulent scheme that used squawk boxes to eavesdrop on the confidential order flow of major brokerages so they could ‘trade ahead’ of large orders at better prices.”
- On August 22, 2005, the SEC “filed civil fraud charges against two former officers of Bristol-Myers Squibb Company for orchestrating a fraudulent earnings management scheme that deceived investors about the true performance, profitability and growth trends of the company and its U.S. medicines business.”
- On August 23, 2005, the SEC “filed charges against two former top Kmart executives for misleading investors about Kmart's financial condition in the months preceding the company's bankruptcy.”
- On November 2, 2005, the SEC “filed enforcement actions against seven individuals alleging they aided and abetted a massive financial fraud by signing and returning materially false audit confirmations sent to them by the auditors of the U.S. Foodservice, Inc. subsidiary of Royal Ahold (Koninklijke Ahold N.V.).”
- On November 28, 2005, the SEC announced “that three affiliates of one of the country’s largest mutual fund managers have agreed to pay $72 million to settle charges they harmed long-term mutual fund shareholders by allowing undisclosed market timing and late trading by favored clients and an employee.”
- On December 1, 2005, the SEC “announced settled enforcement proceedings against American Express Financial Advisors Inc., now known as Ameriprise Financial, Inc. (AEFA), a registered broker-dealer headquartered in Minneapolis, Minn., related to allegations that AEFA failed to adequately disclose millions of dollars in revenue sharing payments that it received from a select group of mutual fund companies. As part of its settlement with the Commission, AEFA will pay $30 million in disgorgement and civil penalties, all of which will be placed in a Fair Fund for distribution to certain of AEFA's customers.”
- On December 1, 2005, the SEC “announced a settled administrative proceeding against Millennium Partners, L.P., Millennium Management, L.L.C., Millennium International Management, L.L.C., Israel Englander, Terence Feeney, Fred Stone, and Kovan Pillai for their participation in a fraudulent scheme to market time mutual funds. The respondents will pay over $180 million in disgorgement and penalties and undertake various compliance reforms to prevent recurrence of similar conduct.”
- On December 19, 2005, the SEC “announced that it filed and settled insider trading charges both against an accountant and a former executive of Sirius Satellite Radio, Inc. who illegally profited from advance knowledge of radio personality Howard Stern’s $500 million contract with Sirius.” [relevance?]
- On December 21, 2005, the SEC “sued top executives of National Century Financial Enterprises, Inc. (NCFE), alleging that they participated in a scheme to defraud investors in securities issued by the subsidiaries of the failed Dublin, Ohio company. NCFE, a private corporation, suddenly collapsed along with its subsidiaries in October 2002 when investors discovered that the companies had hidden massive cash and collateral shortfalls from investors and auditors. The collapse caused investor losses exceeding $2.6 billion and approximately 275 health-care providers were forced to file for bankruptcy protection.”
- On January 3, 2006, the SEC announced “that it filed charges against six former officers of Putnam Fiduciary Trust Company (PFTC), a Boston-based registered transfer agent, for engaging in a scheme beginning in January 2001 by which the defendants defrauded a defined contribution plan client and group of Putnam mutual funds of approximately $4 million.”
- On January 4, 2006, the SEC “filed securities fraud charges against McAfee, Inc., formerly known as Network Associates, Inc., a Santa Clara, California-based manufacturer and supplier of computer security and antivirus tools. McAfee consented, without admitting or denying the allegations of the complaint, to the entry of a Court order enjoining it from violating the antifraud, books and records, internal controls, and periodic reporting provisions of the federal securities laws. The order also requires that McAfee pay a $50 million civil penalty, which the Commission will seek to distribute to harmed investors pursuant to the Fair Funds provision of the Sarbanes–Oxley Act of 2002.”
- On January 9, 2006, the SEC “announced that Daniel Calugar and his former registered broker-dealer, Security Brokerage, Inc. (SBI), agreed to settle the SEC’s charges alleging that they defrauded mutual fund investors through improper late trading and market timing. As part of the settlement, Calugar will disgorge $103 million in ill-gotten gains and pay a civil penalty of $50 million.”
- On February 2, 2006, the SEC “announced that it filed an enforcement action against five former senior executives of General Re Corporation (Gen Re) and American International Group, Inc. (AIG) for helping AIG mislead investors through the use of fraudulent reinsurance transactions.”
- On February 9, 2006, the Commission announced “the filing and settlement of charges that American International Group, Inc. (AIG) committed securities fraud. The settlement is part of a global resolution of federal and state actions under which AIG will pay in excess of $1.6 billion to resolve claims related to improper accounting, bid rigging and practices involving workers’ compensation funds.”
- On March 9, 2006, the SEC filed a lawsuit “against registered investment adviser BMA Ventures, Inc. and its president, William Robert Kepler, 35, of Dallas, Texas, alleging that they illegally obtained approximately $1.9 million in a fraudulent ‘scalping’ scheme from January 2004 through March 2005. Scalping is the illegal practice of recommending that others purchase a security and secretly selling the same security contrary to the recommendation.”
- On March 16, 2006, the SEC “announced a settled enforcement action against Bear, Stearns & Co., Inc. (BS&Co.) and Bear, Stearns Securities Corp. (BSSC) (collectively, Bear Stearns), charging Bear Stearns with securities fraud for facilitating unlawful late trading and deceptive market timing of mutual funds by its customers and customers of its introducing brokers. The Commission issued an Order finding that from 1999 through September 2003, Bear Stearns provided technology, advice and deceptive devices that enabled its market timing customers and introducing brokers to late trade and to evade detection by mutual funds. Pursuant to the Order, Bear Stearns will pay $250 million, consisting of $160 million in disgorgement and a $90 million penalty.”
- On April 11, 2006, the SEC announced “charges against individuals involved in widespread and brazen international schemes of serial insider trading that yielded at least $6.7 million of illicit gains. The schemes were orchestrated by..a research analyst in the Fixed Income division of Goldman Sachs, and a former employee of Goldman Sachs.”
- On July 15, 2007, Delta Data launched a compliance solution for algometric trade analysis to identify market timing in mutual funds. This was the first step towards transparency into sub-accounted mutual fund positions.
