= Wilmer H. Struebing =

American politician

Wilmer H. Struebing (April 2, 1910 – January 7, 2003) was a member of the Wisconsin State Assembly.

== Biography ==
Struebing was born on April 2, 1910, in Brillion. On February 10, 1937, he married Henrietta Vaupel. They had four children. Struebing died on January 7, 2003, in New Holstein.

== Career ==
Struebing was a member of the Assembly from 1963 to 1967. Additionally, he was Chairman of the Brillion Town Board and a member of the Town of Brillion School Board and the Calumet County, Wisconsin Board. Later, he became Chief Clerk of the Assembly in 1967 and Assistant Chief Clerk of the Wisconsin State Senate.
