= MFS Investment Management =

American global investment manager

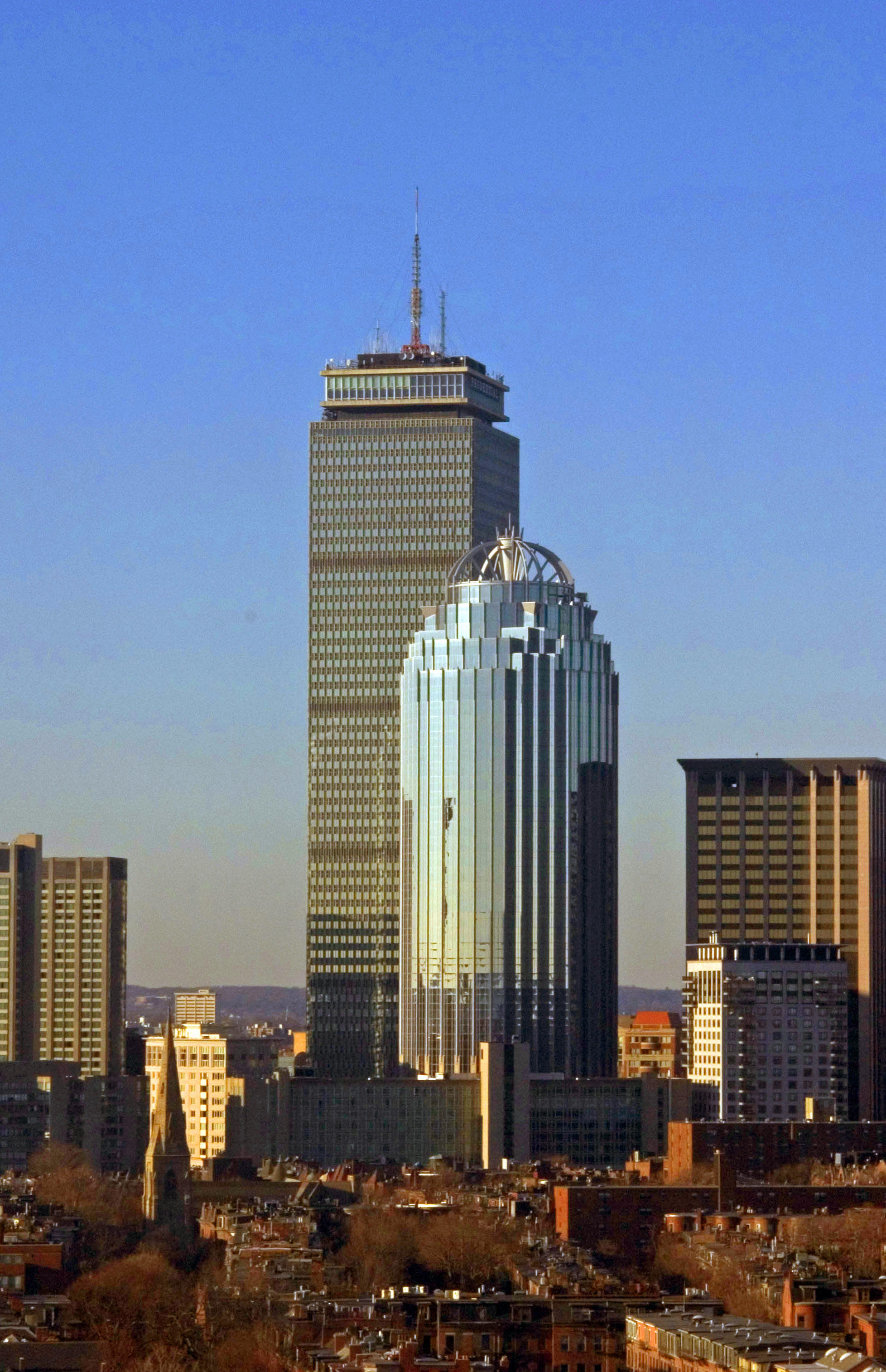
- Headquarters in Boston, Massachusetts
- Company type: Subsidiary
- Industry: Financial services
- Founded: 1924; 102 years ago
- Headquarters: 111 Huntington Avenue; Boston, Massachusetts, U.S.
- Key people: Ted Maloney, CEO; Carol Geremia, President
- Products: Mutual funds
- Services: Asset management
- AUM: US$645.3 billion (September 30, 2024)
- Number of employees: 1,900+ (2020)
- Parent: Sun Life Financial
- Website: mfs.com

MFS Investment Management (MFS) is an American global investment manager that was formerly known as Massachusetts Financial Services. Founded in 1924, MFS is one of the oldest asset management companies in the world and has been credited with pioneering the mutual fund. The first mutual fund, the Massachusetts Investors Trust fund, is still in operation today. MFS had $645.3 billion in assets under management as of September 30, 2024.

== History ==
The company was founded in 1924 by L. Sherman Adams, Charles H. Learoyd and Ashton L. Carr. The company's oldest fund is the Massachusetts Investors Trust, a mutual fund created with $50,000 at the company's inception and reported to be "the world's first open-end investment fund". The company used "brokerage channels" to market its shares to the public and later expanded to $14 million in assets over the next five years. During the stock market crash of 1929 the fund survived an 83% loss and went on to create a second fund in 1934. By 1959, the Massachusetts Investors Trust fund had become the largest mutual fund in the United States.

In 1969, MIT was reorganized as Massachusetts Financial Services (MFS) to reflect the firm's broadened scope of products and services.

In 1976, MFS offered one of the nation’s first national municipal bond funds (Managed Municipal Bond Trust) and in 1981, MFS launched the country’s first globally diversified fixed-income fund (Massachusetts Financial International Trust-Bond Portfolio). In 1986, MFS offered the first closed-end, high-yield municipal bond fund to be traded on the New York Stock Exchange.

In 1982, the company was acquired by Sun Life Financial of Canada.

In 1998, MFS Chairman and Chief Executive, A. Keith Brodkin died, causing a major shift in top management. MFS's assets under management grew from $55 billion to $90 billion between 1997 and 1998, and was reported to be the fastest growing company amongst the twenty largest that funds sold through brokers.

During the early 2000s, MFS and five other mutual fund companies in the Boston area were investigated by Massachusetts and New Hampshire regulators. That same year, the Securities and Exchange Commission alleged that MFS made "false and misleading" statements in its fund prospectus about its policy on market trading and market timing. This was part of a wide-ranging investigation; see 2003 mutual fund scandal for additional details. MFS paid $350 million to settle state and federal fraud charges. MFS appointed Robert Pozen as non-executive chairman from 2004 to 2010. MFS implemented company reforms to inform investors about fees, keep fund boards independent and create deterrents to market timing. This ended "soft-dollar" arrangements which allowed the swapping of brokerage commissions for market research and data.

From 2010 to 2020, assets under management grew from $253 billion to $528.4 billion.

In January 2025, MFS launched its first ETF products, including five different actively managed funds.

In December 2025, it was announced that MFS had agreed to transfer management of nine of its closed-ended funds, with a combined value of around £1.5 billion, to Aberdeen Investments. The reorganisation will consolidate the funds into two larger closed-ended vehicles, allowing Aberdeen to expand its presence in the US fixed income and municipal bond markets.

== See also ==
- Mutual fund
