= Strong Capital Management =

Defunct financial services firm based in Menomonee Falls, Wisconsin

- Industry: Investment management
- Founded: 1974; 52 years ago
- Defunct: 2004
- Fate: Acquired by Wells Fargo
- Headquarters: Menomonee Falls, Wisconsin
- Key people: Richard Strong
- Products: Financial services, Wealth management

Strong Capital Management was a financial services firm based in Menomonee Falls, Wisconsin. During its 30-year existence, it acquired other companies and expanded into the Israeli market. However, it became defunct after the 2003 mutual fund scandal amid charges of improper mutual fund trading.

In May 2004, the firm agreed to pay $80 million in restitution to investors, and founder/CEO Richard Strong agreed to personally pay an additional $60 million; two other executives were also sanctioned and fined. The agreement was reached in a settlement with the Securities and Exchange Commission, New York State Attorney General Eliot Spitzer, and Wisconsin Attorney General Peg Lautenschlager. Unlike most such settlements, the firm admitted wrongdoing and apologized to investors. Strong and the other two executives were barred from the securities industry for life, but no criminal charges were filed.

The settlement cleared the way for the company to be sold. It was acquired by Wells Fargo later in 2004.
