= William P. Atkinson =

American politician

William P. Atkinson (May 14, 1901 - November 1980) was a member of the Wisconsin State Assembly.

== Biography ==
Atkinson was born on May 14, 1901, in Wilkinsburg, Pennsylvania. He attended high school in San Antonio, Texas and Erie, Pennsylvania before graduating from Pennsylvania State University with a bachelor's degree in civil engineering. During World War II, he served in the United States Navy. Atkinson was a member of the Veterans of Foreign Wars, the American Legion, AMVETS, Catholic War Veterans, the Military Officers Association of America, the Fraternal Order of Eagles and the Knights of Columbus.

== Political career ==
Atkinson was elected to the Assembly in 1964 and was re-elected in 1966 and 1968. Previously, he was an alderman in South Milwaukee, Wisconsin from 1950 to 1956, as well as Mayor of South Milwaukee from 1956 to 1964. He was a Democrat.
