= Ronald A. Sell =

American politician

Ronald A. Sell (born April 17, 1945, in Hartford, Wisconsin), is a former member of the Wisconsin State Assembly. He graduated from the University of Wisconsin-Madison and the Lutheran School of Theology at Chicago and became a clergyman. Additionally, Sell attended The Pennsylvania State University — Dickinson School of Law. He is married with two children.

== Political career ==
Sell was elected to the Assembly in 1982. He is a Democrat.
