= Wisconsin's 7th Senate district =

American legislative district in Milwaukee County, Wisconsin

Wisconsin's 7th State Senate district
- 2024 map defined in 2023 Wisc. Act 94; 2022 map defined in Johnson v. Wisconsin Elections Commission; 2011 map was defined in 2011 Wisc. Act 43 composed of Assembly districts 19, 20, and 21
Senator
Chris Larson; D–Milwaukee
since January 3, 2011 (15 years, 309 days)
- Demographics: 78.35% White; 5.3% Black; 9.45% Hispanic; 4.7% Asian; 1.96% Native American; 0.13% Hawaiian/Pacific Islander
- Population (2020) • Voting age: 177,863; 150,001
- Website: Official website
- Notes: Milwaukee metro area (southeast)

The 7th Senate district of Wisconsin is one of 33 districts in the Wisconsin Senate. Located in southeast Wisconsin, the district comprises eastern and southeastern Milwaukee County, including downtown, south side, and lakeshore areas of the city of Milwaukee, as well as the cities of Cudahy, Oak Creek, South Milwaukee, and St. Francis, and part of the city of Greenfield. The district contains landmarks such as the University of Wisconsin–Milwaukee campus, the Milwaukee Art Museum (Quadracci Pavilion), the Port of Milwaukee, Milwaukee Mitchell International Airport, and the Henry Maier Festival Park, site of Milwaukee's annual Summerfest.

== Current elected officials ==
Chris Larson is the senator representing the 7th district. He was first elected in the 2010 general election, after defeating incumbent Jeffrey Plale in a primary challenge.

Each Wisconsin State Senate district is composed of three State Assembly districts. The 7th Senate district comprises the 19th, 20th, and 21st Assembly districts. The current representatives of those districts are:

- Assembly District 19: Ryan Clancy (D–Milwaukee)
- Assembly District 20: Christine Sinicki (D–Milwaukee)
- Assembly District 21: Jessie Rodriguez (R–Oak Creek)

The district is split between Wisconsin's 4th congressional district, which is represented by U.S. Representative Gwen Moore and Wisconsin's 1st congressional district, which is represented by U.S. Representative Bryan Steil. The part of the district in Greenfield is within Wisconsin's 5th congressional district, represented by Scott Fitzgerald.

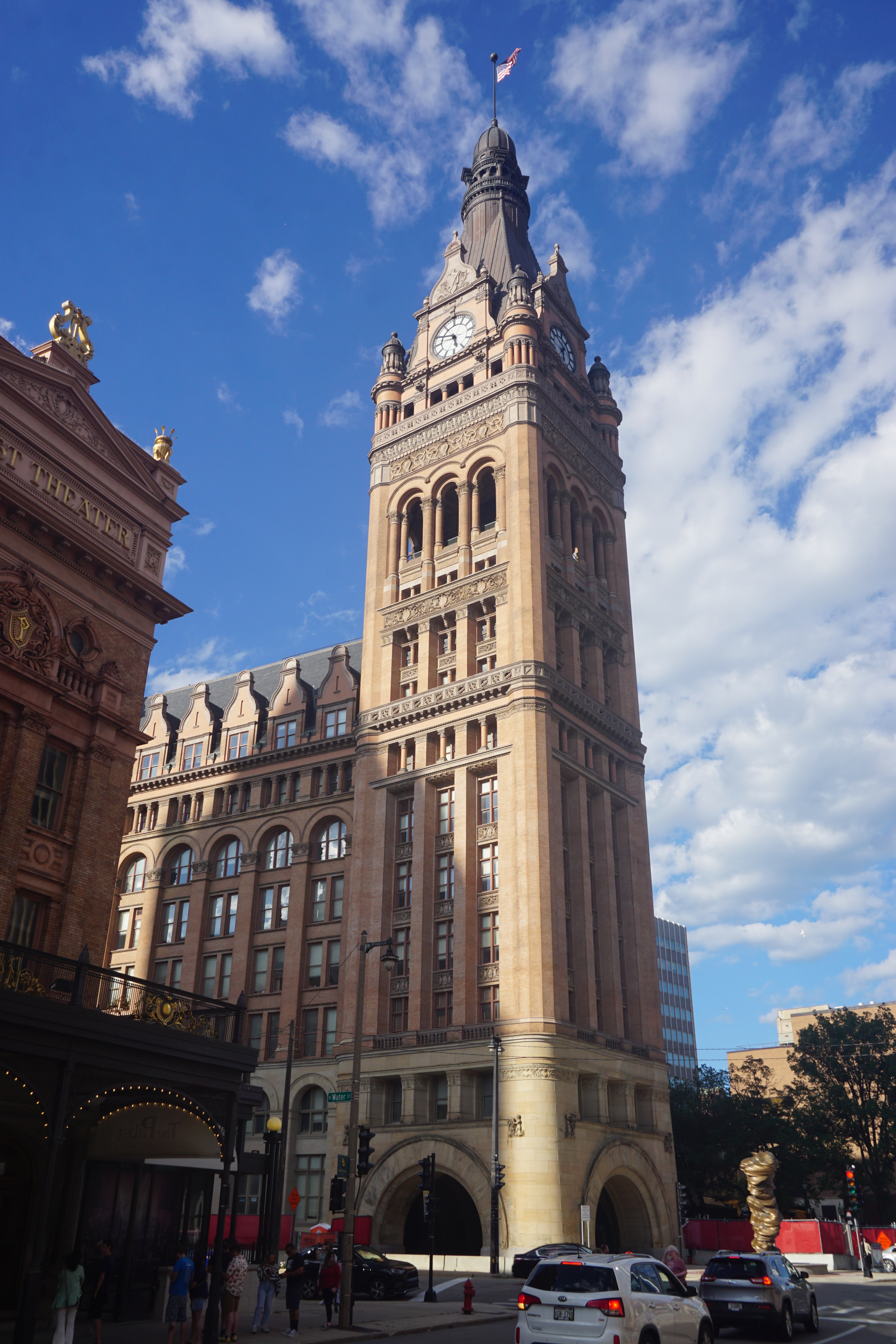
Milwaukee City Hall

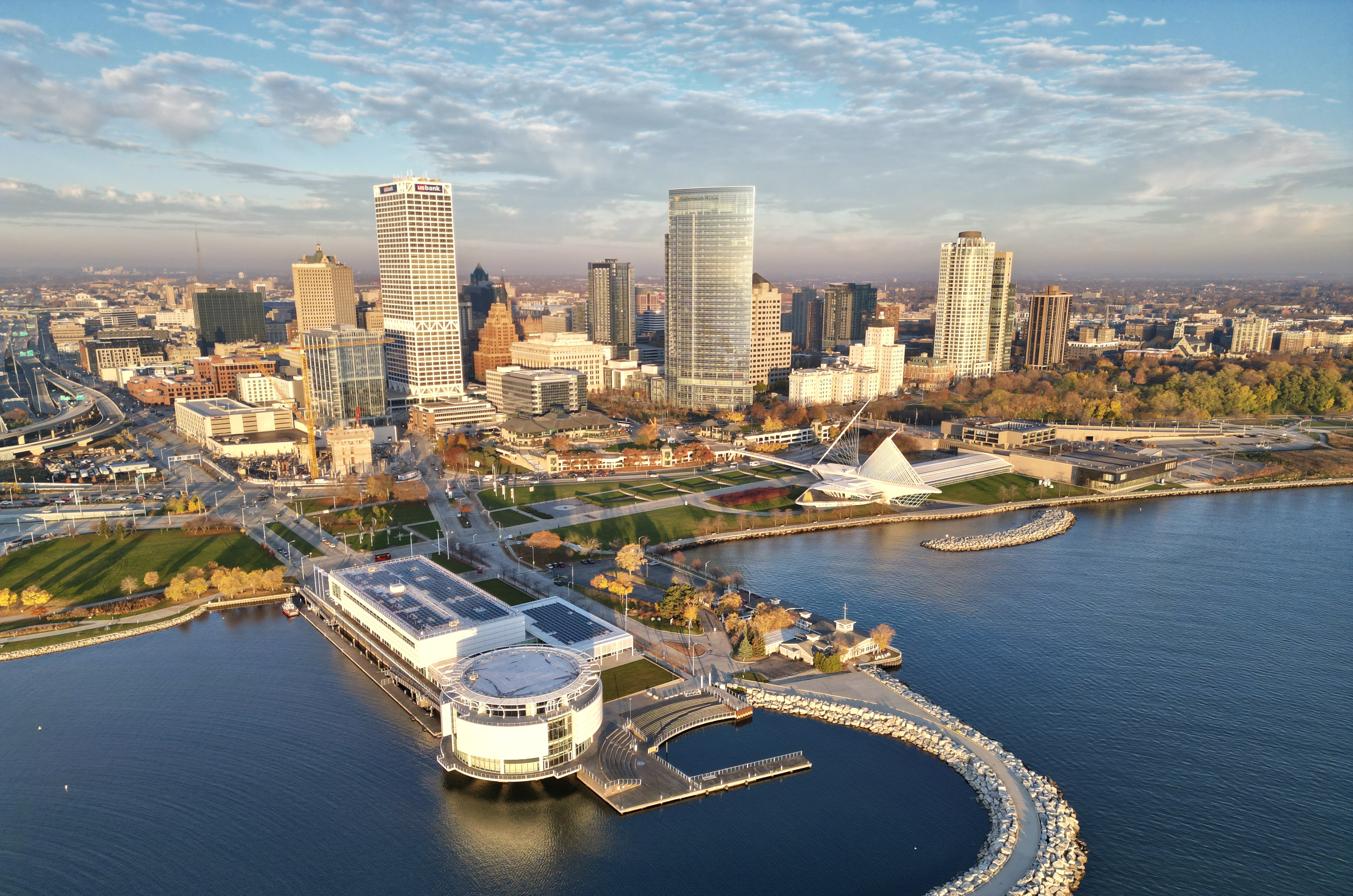
Downtown Milwaukee

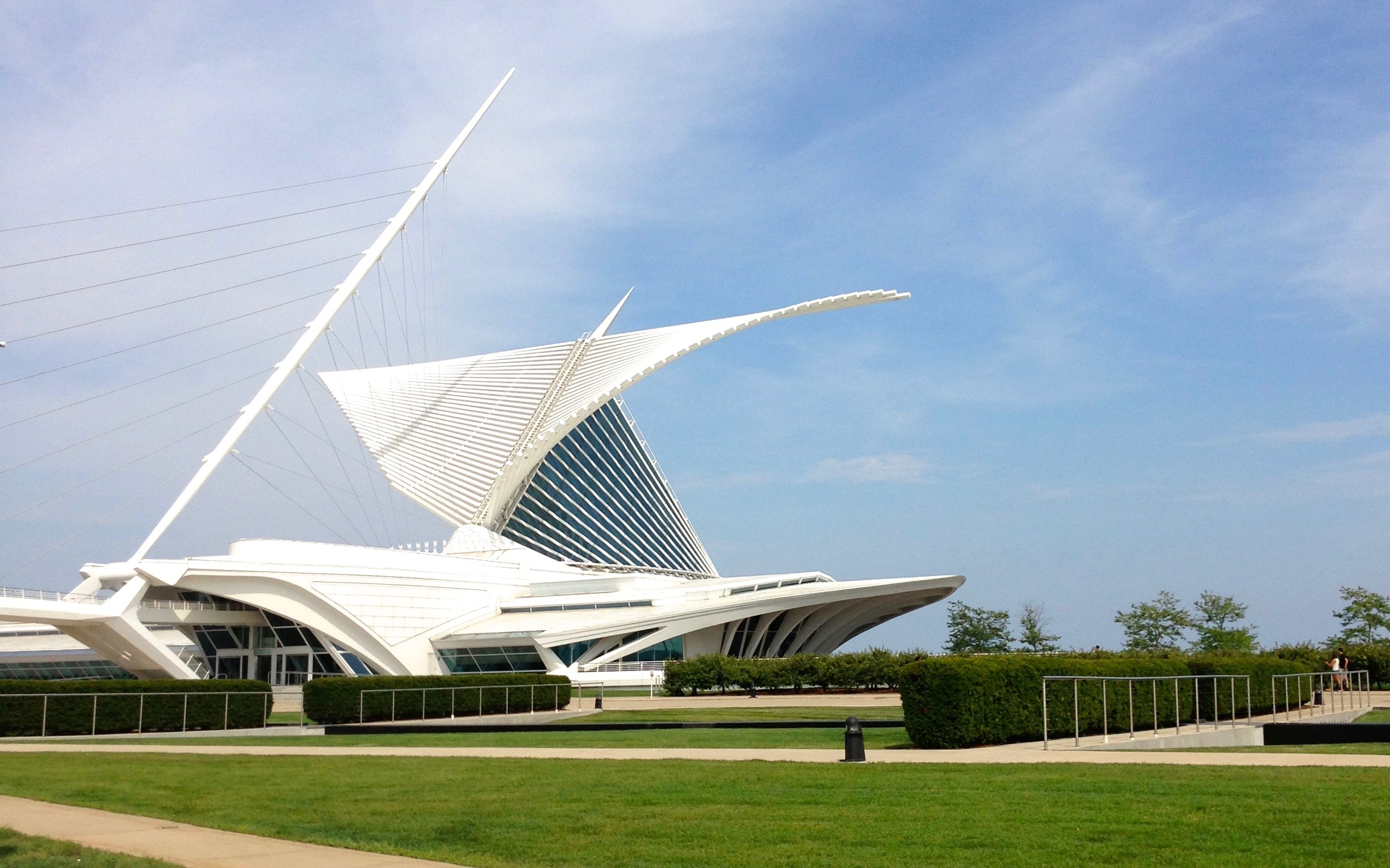
Milwaukee Art Museum

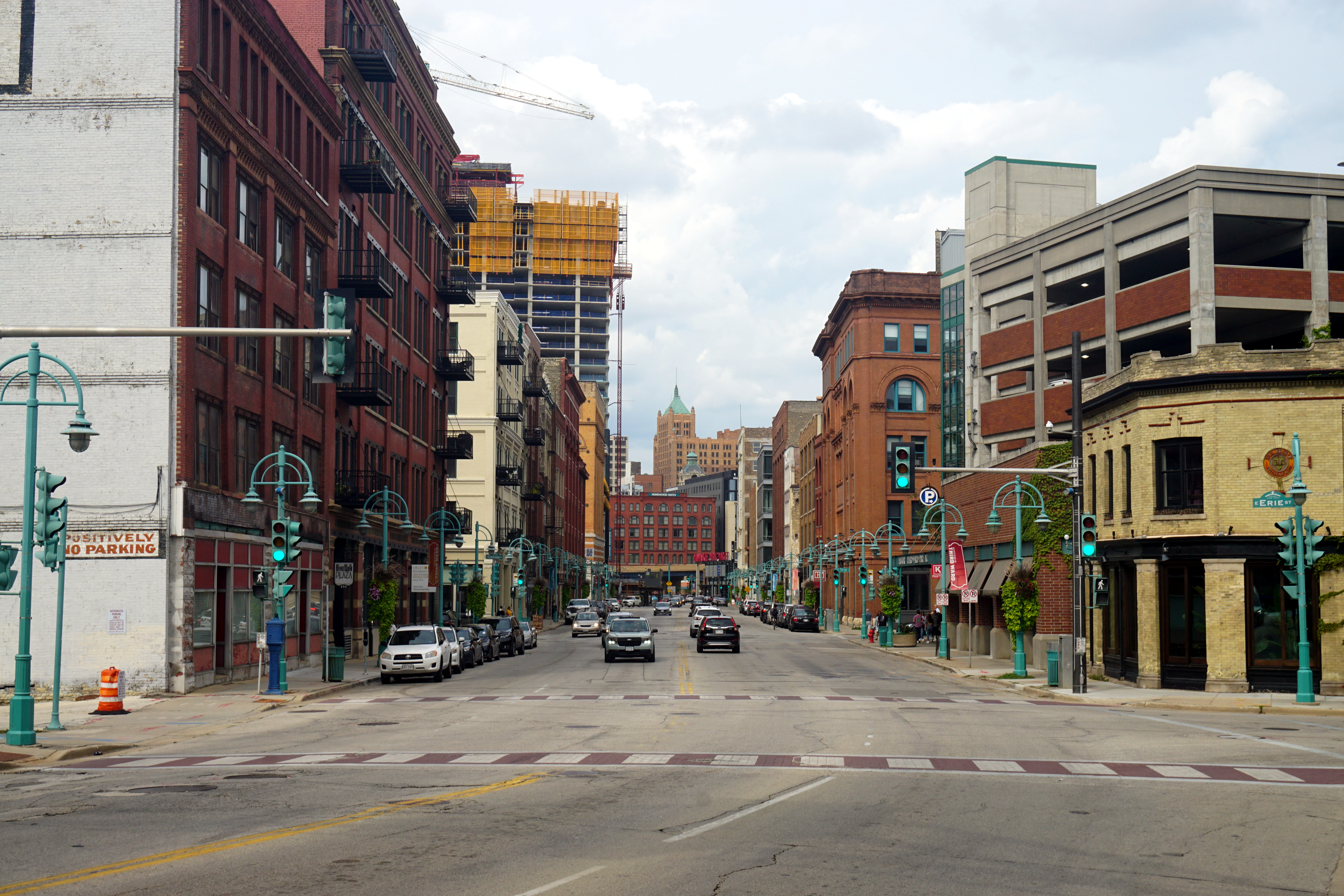
Historic Third Ward

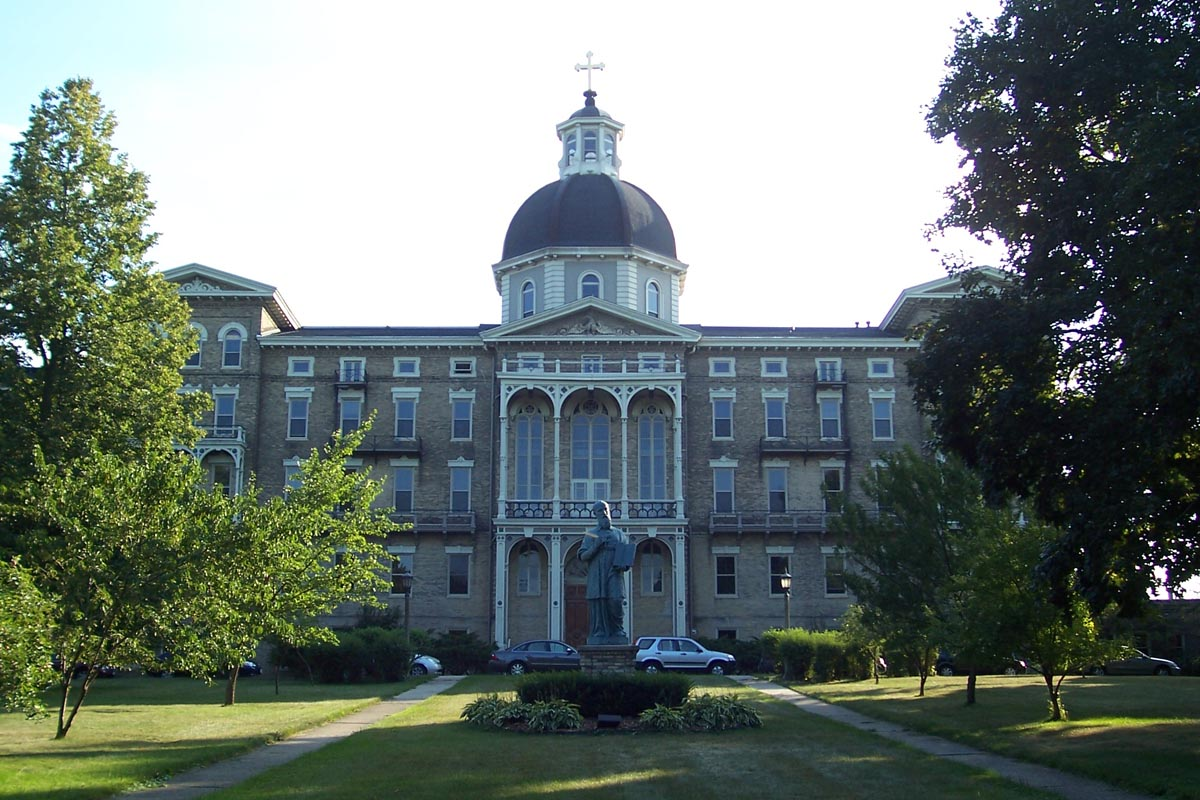
Saint Francis de Sales Seminary

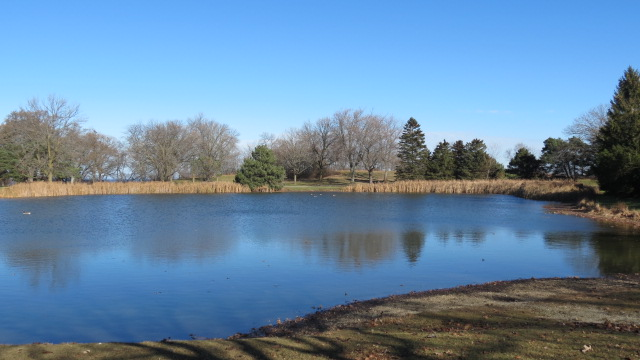
Pond in Sheridan Park, in Cudahy

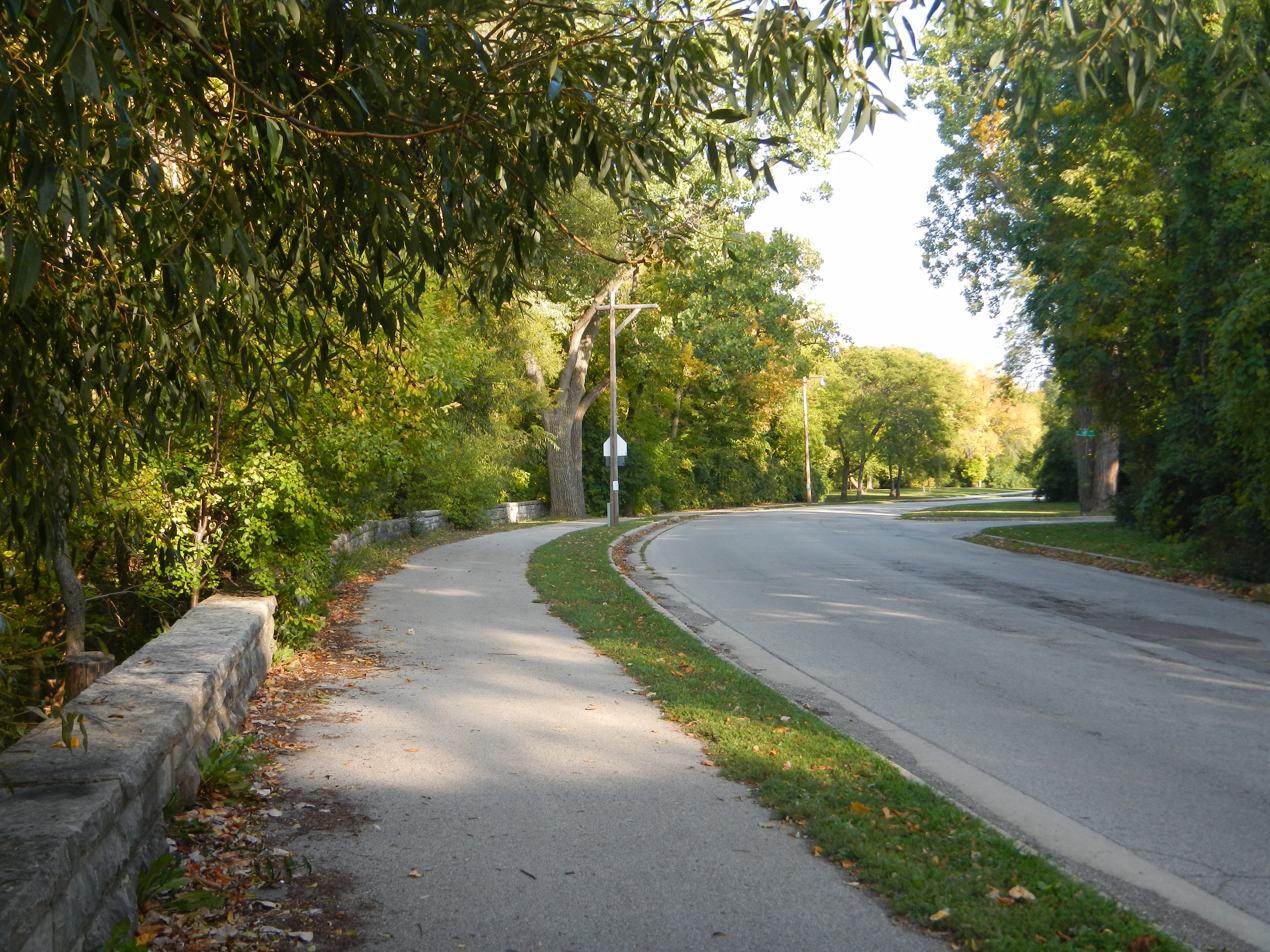
Section of Oak Creek Parkway in South Milwaukee

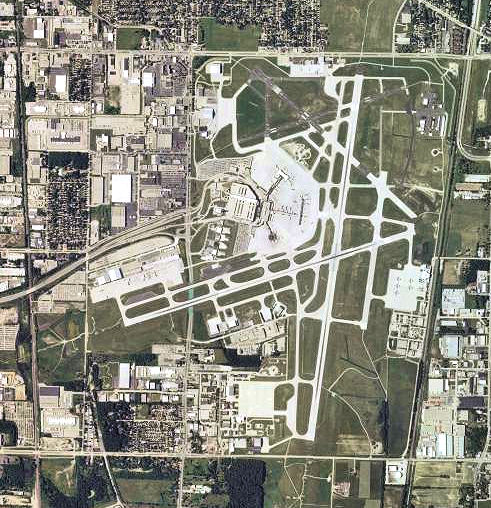
Milwaukee Mitchell International Airport

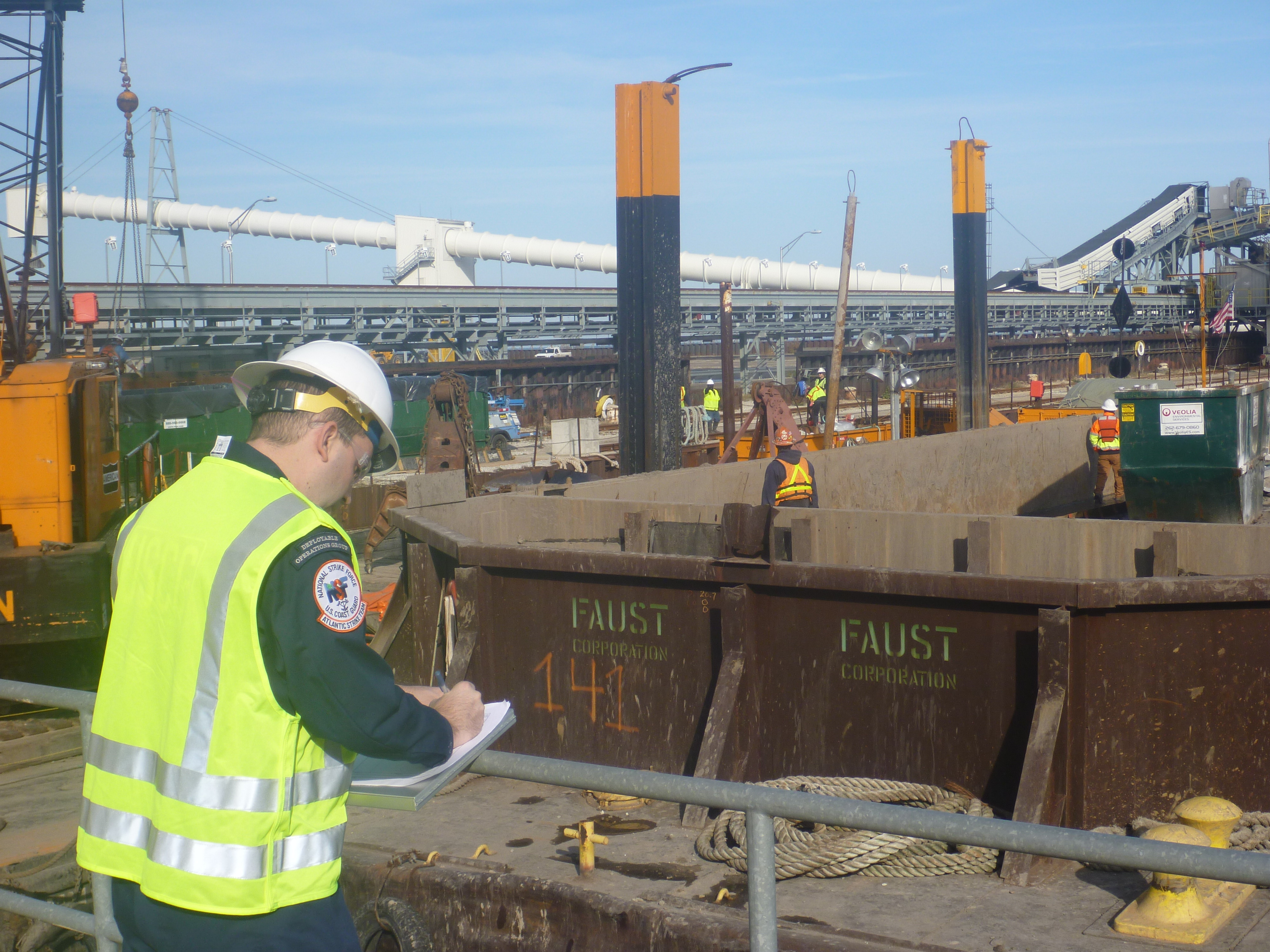
Oak Creek Power Plant

== List of senators ==
Note: the boundaries of districts have changed repeatedly over history. Previous politicians of a specific numbered district have represented a completely different geographic area, due to redistricting.

Member	Party	Electoral history	Years	Leg. Term	District
District established March 13, 1848, by Art. XIV, Wis. Const.
Thomas K. Gibson (Benton)	Democratic	Elected to the short term in May 1848.	June 5, 1848 – January 1, 1849	1st	Lafayette County
Dennis Murphy (Shullsburg)	Democratic	Elected in 1848.	January 1, 1849 – January 6, 1851	2nd 3rd	Lafayette County
Samuel G. Bugh (Shullsburg)	Democratic	Elected in 1850.	January 6, 1851 – January 3, 1853	4th 5th	Lafayette County
John W. Cary (Racine)	Democratic	Elected in 1852.	January 3, 1853 – January 1, 1855	6th 7th	1852–1855 1856–1860 1861–1865 1866–1870; Racine County
Charles Clement (Racine)	Republican	Elected in 1854.	January 1, 1855 – January 5, 1857	8th 9th	1852–1855 1856–1860 1861–1865 1866–1870; Racine County
Champion S. Chase (Racine)	Republican	Elected in 1856.	January 5, 1857 – January 3, 1859	10th 11th	1852–1855 1856–1860 1861–1865 1866–1870; Racine County
Nicholas D. Fratt (Racine)	Democratic	Elected in 1858.	January 3, 1859 – January 7, 1861	12th 13th	1852–1855 1856–1860 1861–1865 1866–1870; Racine County
William L. Utley (Racine)	Republican	Elected in 1860.	January 7, 1861 – January 5, 1863	14th 15th	1852–1855 1856–1860 1861–1865 1866–1870; Racine County
Timothy D. Morris (Whitesville)	Republican	Elected in 1862.	January 5, 1863 – January 2, 1865	16th	1852–1855 1856–1860 1861–1865 1866–1870; Racine County
Timothy D. Morris (Whitesville)	National; Union	Elected in 1862.	January 5, 1863 – January 2, 1865	17th	1852–1855 1856–1860 1861–1865 1866–1870; Racine County
Jerome Case (Racine)	National; Union	Elected in 1864.	January 2, 1865 – January 7, 1867	18th 19th	1852–1855 1856–1860 1861–1865 1866–1870; Racine County
Henry Stevens (Caledonia)	National; Union	Elected in 1866, 1868.	January 7, 1867 – January 2, 1871	20th 21st	1852–1855 1856–1860 1861–1865 1866–1870; Racine County
Henry Stevens (Caledonia)	Republican	Elected in 1866, 1868.	January 7, 1867 – January 2, 1871	22nd 23rd	1852–1855 1856–1860 1861–1865 1866–1870; Racine County
Philo Belden (Rochester)	Republican	Elected in 1870. Redistricted to the 5th district.	January 2, 1871 – January 1, 1872	24th	1852–1855 1856–1860 1861–1865 1866–1870; Racine County
William M. Colladay (Dunn)	Republican	Redistricted from the 11th district.	January 1, 1872 – January 6, 1873	25th	Eastern Dane County: Town of Albion; Town of Blooming Grove; Town of Bristol; Town of Burke; Town of Christiana; Town of Cottage Grove; Town of Deerfield; Town of Dunkirk; Town of Dunn; Town of Medina; Town of Pleasant Springs; Town of Sun Prairie; Town of Windsor; Town of York; City of Madison
John Anders Johnson (Madison)	Republican	Elected in 1872.	January 6, 1873 – January 4, 1875	26th 27th	Eastern Dane County: Town of Albion; Town of Blooming Grove; Town of Bristol; Town of Burke; Town of Christiana; Town of Cottage Grove; Town of Deerfield; Town of Dunkirk; Town of Dunn; Town of Medina; Town of Pleasant Springs; Town of Sun Prairie; Town of Windsor; Town of York; City of Madison
George E. Bryant (Madison)	Republican	Elected in 1874.	January 4, 1875 – January 1, 1877	28th 29th	Eastern Dane County: Town of Albion; Town of Blooming Grove; Town of Bristol; Town of Burke; Town of Christiana; Town of Cottage Grove; Town of Deerfield; Town of Dunkirk; Town of Dunn; Town of Medina; Town of Pleasant Springs; Town of Sun Prairie; Town of Windsor; Town of York; City of Madison
George A. Abert (Milwaukee)	Democratic	Elected in 1876.	January 1, 1877 – January 6, 1879	30th 31st	Central Milwaukee County: * Wards 2, 3, 4, 7, city of Milwaukee
Edwin Hyde (Milwaukee)	Republican	Elected in 1878.	January 6, 1879 – January 3, 1881	32nd 33rd	Central Milwaukee County: * Wards 2, 3, 4, 7, city of Milwaukee
Edward B. Simpson (Milwaukee)	Republican	Elected in 1880.	January 3, 1881 – January 1, 1883	34th 35th	Central Milwaukee County: * Wards 2, 3, 4, 7, city of Milwaukee
William S. Stanley (Milwaukee)	Republican	Elected in 1882.	January 1, 1883 – January 3, 1887	36th 37th	Central Milwaukee County: * Wards 2, 3, 4, 7, city of Milwaukee
Christian Widule (Milwaukee)	Republican	Elected in 1886.	January 3, 1887 – January 5, 1891	38th	Central Milwaukee County: * Wards 2, 3, 4, 7, city of Milwaukee
Christian Widule (Milwaukee)	Republican	Elected in 1886.	January 3, 1887 – January 5, 1891	39th	Most of Milwaukee County: Town of Franklin; Town of Granville; Town of Greenfield; Town of Lake; Town of Milwaukee; Town of Oak Creek; Town of Wauwatosa; Wards 10, 17, City of Milwaukee
Christian A. Koenitzer (Milwaukee)	Democratic	Elected in 1890.	January 5, 1891 – January 7, 1895	40th	Most of Milwaukee County: Town of Franklin; Town of Granville; Town of Greenfield; Town of Lake; Town of Milwaukee; Town of Oak Creek; Town of Wauwatosa; Wards 10, 17, City of Milwaukee
Christian A. Koenitzer (Milwaukee)	Democratic	Elected in 1890.	January 5, 1891 – January 7, 1895	41st	Northern Milwaukee County & Eastern Waukesha County: Milwaukee County; Town of Granville; Town of Milwaukee; Town of Wauwatosa; Ward 10, city of Milwaukee; Waukesha County; Town of Brookfield; Town of Menomonee; Town of Muskego; Town of New Berlin; Town of Vernon; Village of Waukesha; City of Waukesha; Ward 10, city of Milwaukee
Charles T. Fisher (Milwaukee)	Republican	Elected in 1894.	January 7, 1895 – January 2, 1899	42nd	Northern Milwaukee County & Eastern Waukesha County: Milwaukee County; Town of Granville; Town of Milwaukee; Town of Wauwatosa; Ward 10, city of Milwaukee; Waukesha County; Town of Brookfield; Town of Menomonee; Town of Muskego; Town of New Berlin; Town of Vernon; Village of Waukesha; City of Waukesha; Ward 10, city of Milwaukee
Charles T. Fisher (Milwaukee)	Republican	Elected in 1894.	January 7, 1895 – January 2, 1899	43rd	Southern Milwaukee County: Town of Franklin; Town of Greenfield; Town of Lake; Town of Oak Creek; Town of Wauwatosa; Village of Cudahy; Village of South Milwaukee; Village of Wauwatosa; Wards 14, 17, city of Milwaukee
Barney A. Eaton (Milwaukee)	Republican	Elected in 1898.	January 2, 1899 – January 7, 1907	44th 45th	Southern Milwaukee County: Town of Franklin; Town of Greenfield; Town of Lake; Town of Oak Creek; Town of Wauwatosa; Village of Cudahy; Village of South Milwaukee; Village of Wauwatosa; Wards 14, 17, city of Milwaukee
Barney A. Eaton (Milwaukee)	Republican	Re-elected in 1902.	January 2, 1899 – January 7, 1907	46th 47th	Southern Milwaukee County: Town of Franklin; Town of Greenfield; Town of Lake; Town of Oak Creek; Town of Wauwatosa; Village of Cudahy; City of South Milwaukee; City of Wauwatosa; Wards 14, 17, city of Milwaukee
George E. Page (Milwaukee)	Republican	Elected in 1906.	January 7, 1907 – January 2, 1911	48th 49th	Southern Milwaukee County: Town of Franklin; Town of Greenfield; Town of Lake; Town of Oak Creek; Town of Wauwatosa; Village of Cudahy; City of South Milwaukee; City of Wauwatosa; Wards 14, 17, city of Milwaukee
Gabriel Zophy (Milwaukee)	Social; Democratic	Elected in 1910.	January 2, 1911 – January 4, 1915	50th	Southern Milwaukee County: Town of Franklin; Town of Greenfield; Town of Lake; Town of Oak Creek; Town of Wauwatosa; Village of Cudahy; City of South Milwaukee; City of Wauwatosa; Wards 14, 17, city of Milwaukee
Gabriel Zophy (Milwaukee)	Social; Democratic	Elected in 1910.	January 2, 1911 – January 4, 1915	51st	Southern Milwaukee County: Town of Franklin; Town of Greenfield; Town of Lake; Town of Oak Creek; Village of West Milwaukee; City of Cudahy; City of South Milwaukee; City of West Allis; Wards 14, 17, 24, city of Milwaukee
Louis A. Arnold (Milwaukee)	Social; Democratic	Elected in 1914, 1918.	January 4, 1915 – January 1, 1923	52nd 53rd	Southern Milwaukee County: Town of Franklin; Town of Greenfield; Town of Lake; Town of Oak Creek; Village of West Milwaukee; City of Cudahy; City of South Milwaukee; City of West Allis; Wards 14, 17, 24, city of Milwaukee
Louis A. Arnold (Milwaukee)	Socialist	Elected in 1914, 1918.	January 4, 1915 – January 1, 1923	54th 55th	Southern Milwaukee County: Town of Franklin; Town of Greenfield; Town of Lake; Town of Oak Creek; Village of West Milwaukee; City of Cudahy; City of South Milwaukee; City of West Allis; Wards 14, 17, 24, city of Milwaukee
William F. Quick (Milwaukee)	Socialist	Elected in 1922.	January 1, 1923 – January 3, 1927	56th 57th	Southeast Milwaukee County: Town of Lake; Town of Oak Creek; City of Cudahy; City of South Milwaukee; Wards 5, 12, 17, city of Milwaukee
Herbert H. Smith (Milwaukee)	Republican	Elected in 1926.	January 3, 1927 – January 5, 1931	58th 59th	Southeast Milwaukee County: Town of Lake; Town of Oak Creek; City of Cudahy; City of South Milwaukee; Wards 5, 12, 17, city of Milwaukee
Leonard Fons (Milwaukee)	Republican	Elected in 1930.	January 5, 1931 – January 7, 1935	60th	Southeast Milwaukee County: Town of Lake; Town of Oak Creek; City of Cudahy; City of South Milwaukee; Wards 5, 12, 17, city of Milwaukee
Leonard Fons (Milwaukee)	Republican	Elected in 1930.	January 5, 1931 – January 7, 1935	61st	Southeast Milwaukee County: Town of Lake; Town of Oak Creek; City of Cudahy; City of South Milwaukee; Wards 12, 14, 17, 27, City of Milwaukee
Max Galasinski (Milwaukee)	Democratic	Elected in 1934.	January 7, 1935 – January 2, 1939	62nd 63rd	Southeast Milwaukee County: Town of Lake; Town of Oak Creek; City of Cudahy; City of South Milwaukee; Wards 12, 14, 17, 27, City of Milwaukee
Anthony P. Gawronski (Milwaukee)	Democratic	Elected in 1938, 1942, 1946. Resigned.	January 2, 1939 – December 17, 1948	64th 65th 66th 67th	Southeast Milwaukee County: Town of Lake; Town of Oak Creek; City of Cudahy; City of South Milwaukee; Wards 12, 14, 17, 27, City of Milwaukee
Anthony P. Gawronski (Milwaukee)	Democratic	Elected in 1938, 1942, 1946. Resigned.	January 2, 1939 – December 17, 1948	68th	Southeast Milwaukee County: Town of Lake; Town of Oak Creek; City of Cudahy; City of South Milwaukee; Wards 12, 14, 17, 27, City of Milwaukee
--Vacant--			December 17, 1948 – April 18, 1949	68th	Southeast Milwaukee County: Town of Lake; Town of Oak Creek; City of Cudahy; City of South Milwaukee; Wards 12, 14, 17, 27, City of Milwaukee
--Vacant--			December 17, 1948 – April 18, 1949	69th	Southeast Milwaukee County: Town of Lake; Town of Oak Creek; City of Cudahy; City of South Milwaukee; Wards 12, 14, 17, 27, City of Milwaukee
Roman R. Blenski (Milwaukee)	Democratic	Elected in 1949 special. Re-elected in 1950.	April 18, 1949 – January 3, 1955	69th	Southeast Milwaukee County: Town of Lake; Town of Oak Creek; City of Cudahy; City of South Milwaukee; Wards 12, 14, 17, 27, City of Milwaukee
Roman R. Blenski (Milwaukee)	Democratic	Elected in 1949 special. Re-elected in 1950.	April 18, 1949 – January 3, 1955	70th 71st	Southeast Milwaukee County: Town of Lake; Town of Oak Creek; City of Cudahy; City of South Milwaukee; Wards 12, 14, 17, 27, City of Milwaukee
Leland McParland (Cudahy)	Democratic	Elected in 1954, 1958, 1962.	January 3, 1955 – January 4, 1971	72nd 73rd 74th 75th 76th	Southern Milwaukee County: Town (later city) of Franklin; Town (later city) of Greenfield; Town (later city) of Oak Creek; Village of Greendale; Village of Hales Corners; City of Cudahy; City of Saint Francis; City of South Milwaukee; Ward 5, City of West Allis; Wards 17, 19, city of Milwaukee
Leland McParland (Cudahy)	Democratic	Elected in 1954, 1958, 1962.	January 3, 1955 – January 4, 1971	77th	Southeast Milwaukee County: City of Cudahy; City of Oak Creek; City of Saint Francis; City of South Milwaukee; Wards 17, 19, city of Milwaukee
Leland McParland (Cudahy)	Democratic	Re-elected in 1966.	January 3, 1955 – January 4, 1971	78th 79th	Southeast Milwaukee County: City of Cudahy; City of Oak Creek; City of Saint Francis; City of South Milwaukee; Wards 17, 19, city of Milwaukee
Kurt Frank (Milwaukee)	Democratic	Elected in 1970.	January 4, 1971 – January 3, 1983	80th	Southeast Milwaukee County: City of Cudahy; City of Oak Creek; City of Saint Francis; City of South Milwaukee; Wards 17, 19, city of Milwaukee
Kurt Frank (Milwaukee)	Democratic	Elected in 1970.	January 4, 1971 – January 3, 1983	81st	Southeast Milwaukee County: City of Cudahy; City of Oak Creek; City of Saint Francis; City of South Milwaukee; Wards 17, 20, City of Milwaukee
Kurt Frank (Milwaukee)	Democratic	Elected in 1974, 1978.	January 4, 1971 – January 3, 1983	82nd 83rd 84th 85th	Southeast Milwaukee County: City of Cudahy; City of Oak Creek; City of Saint Francis; City of South Milwaukee; Wards 17, 20, City of Milwaukee
Jerry Kleczka (Milwaukee)	Democratic	Elected in 1982. Resigned after election to U.S. House.	January 3, 1983 – April 3, 1984	86th	Southeast Milwaukee County: City of Cudahy; City of Saint Francis; City of South Milwaukee; Wards 205, 206, 234, 240-261, 263-281, city of Milwaukee; Wards 2, 6, 7, 9, 10, 11, 12, city of Oak Creek
--Vacant--			April 3, 1984 – November 13, 1984	86th	Southeast Milwaukee County: City of Cudahy; City of Saint Francis; City of South Milwaukee; Wards 205, 206, 234, 240-261, 263-281, city of Milwaukee; Wards 2, 6, 7, 9, 10, 11, 12, city of Oak Creek
John R. Plewa (Milwaukee)	Democratic	Elected in 1984 special. Re-elected in 1986, 1990.	November 13, 1984 – September 13, 1995	86th	Southeast Milwaukee County: City of Cudahy; City of Saint Francis; City of South Milwaukee; Wards 205, 206, 234, 240-261, 263-281, city of Milwaukee; Wards 2, 6, 7, 9, 10, 11, 12, city of Oak Creek
John R. Plewa (Milwaukee)	Democratic	Elected in 1984 special. Re-elected in 1986, 1990.	November 13, 1984 – September 13, 1995	87th 88th 89th 90th	Southeast Milwaukee County: City of Cudahy; City of Saint Francis; City of South Milwaukee; Wards 205, 206, 234, 240-261, 263-281, city of Milwaukee; Wards 2, 6, 7, 9, 10, 11, 12, city of Oak Creek
John R. Plewa (Milwaukee)	Democratic	Elected in 1984 special. Re-elected in 1986, 1990.	November 13, 1984 – September 13, 1995	91st	Southeast Milwaukee County: City of Cudahy; City of Oak Creek; City of Saint Francis; City of South Milwaukee; Wards 43, 45, 46, 48-57, 61, 62, 64, 235, 238-240, 242-251, 258-265, 268-270, city of Milwaukee
John R. Plewa (Milwaukee)	Democratic	Re-elected in 1994. Died in office.	November 13, 1984 – September 13, 1995	92nd	Southeast Milwaukee County: City of Cudahy; City of Oak Creek; City of Saint Francis; City of South Milwaukee; Wards 43, 45, 46, 48-57, 61, 62, 64, 235, 238-240, 242-251, 258-265, 268-270, city of Milwaukee
--Vacant--			September 13, 1995 – January 2, 1996	92nd	Southeast Milwaukee County: City of Cudahy; City of Oak Creek; City of Saint Francis; City of South Milwaukee; Wards 43, 45, 46, 48-57, 61, 62, 64, 235, 238-240, 242-251, 258-265, 268-270, city of Milwaukee
Richard Grobschmidt (South Milwaukee)	Democratic	Elected in 1995 special. Re-elected in 1998.	January 2, 1996 – January 13, 2003	92nd	Southeast Milwaukee County: City of Cudahy; City of Oak Creek; City of Saint Francis; City of South Milwaukee; Wards 43, 45, 46, 48-57, 61, 62, 64, 235, 238-240, 242-251, 258-265, 268-270, city of Milwaukee
Richard Grobschmidt (South Milwaukee)	Democratic	Elected in 1995 special. Re-elected in 1998.	January 2, 1996 – January 13, 2003	93rd 94th 95th	Southeast Milwaukee County: City of Cudahy; City of Oak Creek; City of Saint Francis; City of South Milwaukee; Wards 43, 45, 46, 48-57, 61, 62, 64, 235, 238-240, 242-251, 258-265, 268-270, city of Milwaukee
Richard Grobschmidt (South Milwaukee)	Democratic	Re-elected in 2002. Resigned.	January 2, 1996 – January 13, 2003	96th	Southeast Milwaukee County: City of Cudahy; City of Oak Creek; City of Saint Francis; City of South Milwaukee; Wards 39, 42-47, 49-59, 216, 222-230, 232-241, 249-257, city of Milwaukee
--Vacant--			January 13, 2003 – May 9, 2003	96th	Southeast Milwaukee County: City of Cudahy; City of Oak Creek; City of Saint Francis; City of South Milwaukee; Wards 39, 42-47, 49-59, 216, 222-230, 232-241, 249-257, city of Milwaukee
Jeffrey Plale (South Milwaukee)	Democratic	Elected in 2003 special. Re-elected in 2006.	May 9, 2003 – January 3, 2011	96th	Southeast Milwaukee County: City of Cudahy; City of Oak Creek; City of Saint Francis; City of South Milwaukee; Wards 39, 42-47, 49-59, 216, 222-230, 232-241, 249-257, city of Milwaukee
Jeffrey Plale (South Milwaukee)	Democratic	Elected in 2003 special. Re-elected in 2006.	May 9, 2003 – January 3, 2011	97th 98th 99th	Southeast Milwaukee County: City of Cudahy; City of Oak Creek; City of Saint Francis; City of South Milwaukee; Wards 39, 42-47, 49-59, 216, 222-230, 232-241, 249-257, city of Milwaukee
Chris Larson (Milwaukee)	Democratic	Elected in 2010.	January 3, 2011 – Current	100th	Southeast Milwaukee County: City of Cudahy; City of Oak Creek; City of Saint Francis; City of South Milwaukee; Wards 39, 42-47, 49-59, 216, 222-230, 232-241, 249-257, city of Milwaukee
Chris Larson (Milwaukee)	Democratic	Elected in 2010.	January 3, 2011 – Current	101st	Southeast Milwaukee County: City of Cudahy; City of Oak Creek; City of Saint Francis; City of South Milwaukee; blocks of the city of Milwaukee: U.S. census tract 7200, blocks 1000, 1001, 1002, 1003, 1004, 1005; U.S. census tract 7300, blocks 1000, 1001, 1002, 1003, 1004, 1005, 1006, 1007, 2000, 2001, 2002, 2003, 2004, 2005, 2006, 3000, 3001, 3002, 3003, 3004, 3005, 3006, 3007, 3008, 3009, 3010; U.S. census tract 7400, blocks 1000, 1001, 1002, 1003, 1004, 1005, 1006, 1007, 1008, 1009, 2002, 2003, 2004, 2005, 2006, 2007, 2008, 2009, 2010, 2011, 2012; U.S. census tract 7500, blocks 1000, 1001, 1002, 1003, 1004, 1005, 1006, 1007, 1008, 2000, 2001, 2002, 2003, 2004, 2005, 2006, 2007, 2008, 3000, 3001, 3002, 3003, 3004, 3005, 3006, 3007, 3008, 3009, 3010, 3011, 3012, 3013, 3014, 3015, 3016; U.S. census tract 7600, blocks 1000, 1001, 1002, 1003, 1004, 1005, 1006, 1007, 1008, 2000, 2001, 2002, 2003, 2004, 2005, 2006, 2007, 3000, 3001, 3002, 3003, 3004, 3005, 3006, 3007, 3008, 3009, 3010, 3011, 3012; U.S. census tract 7700, blocks 1000, 1001, 1002, 1003, 1004, 1005, 1006, 1007, 1008, 2000, 2001, 2002, 2003, 2004, 2005, 2006, 2007, 2008, 2009, 2010, 2011, 2012, 2013, 2014, 2015, 3000, 3001, 3002, 3003, 3004, 3005, 3006, 3007, 3008, 3009; U.S. census tract 7800, blocks 1000, 1001, 1002, 1003, 1004, 1005, 1006, 2000, 2001, 2002, 2003, 2004, 2005, 2006, 3000, 3001, 3002, 3003, 3004, 3005, 3006, 3007, 3008, 3009, 3010, 3011; U.S. census tract 7900, blocks 1000, 1001, 1002, 1003, 1004, 1005; U.S. census tract 10700, blocks 2016, 2017, 2022, 2023, 2024, 2026; U.S. census tract 10800, blocks 1000, 1001, 1002, 1003, 1004, 1005, 1006, 1007, 1008, 1009, 1010, 1011, 1012, 1013, 1014, 2000, 2001, 2002, 2003, 2004, 2005, 2006; U.S. census tract 11000, blocks 1000, 1001, 1002, 1003, 1004, 1005, 1006, 2000, 2001, 2002, 2003, 2004, 2005; U.S. census tract 11100, blocks 1000, 1001, 1002, 1003, 1004, 1005, 1006, 1007, 2000, 2001, 2002, 2003, 2004, 2005, 2006, 2007, 2008; U.S. census tract 11200, blocks 1000, 1001, 1002, 1003, 1004, 1005, 1006, 1007, 2000, 2001, 2002, 2003, 2004, 2005, 2006, 2007, 2008, 2009, 2010, 2011, 2012, 2013, 2014; U.S. census tract 11300, blocks 1000, 1001, 1002, 1003, 1004, 1005, 1006, 1007, 1008, 1009, 1010, 1011, 1012, 1013, 1014, 1015, 1016, 1017, 1018, 1019, 1020, 1021, 1022, 2000, 2001, 2002, 2003; U.S. census tract 11400, blocks 1026, 1027, 1028, 1030; U.S. census tract 14300, blocks 1000, 1001, 1002, 1003, 1004, 2000, 2001, 2002, 2003, 2004, 2005, 2006, 2007, 2008, 2009, 2010, 2011, 2012, 2013; U.S. census tract 14400, blocks 1000, 1001, 1002, 1003, 1004, 1005, 1006, 1007, 1008, 1009, 1010, 1011, 1012, 1013, 1014, 1015, 1016, 1017, 1018, 1019, 1020, 1021, 1022, 1023, 1024, 1025, 1026, 2000, 2001, 2002, 2003, 2004, 2005, 2006, 2007, 2008, 2009, 2010, 2011, 2012; U.S. census tract 16500, blocks 3000, 3021; U.S. census tract 16600, blocks 2017, 2018, 2025; U.S. census tract 17900, blocks 1000, 1001, 1002, 1006, 1007, 1008, 2000, 2001, 2002, 2005, 2006, 2007, 3000, 3001, 3002, 3003, 3004, 3005, 3006, 3007, 3008, 3009, 3010, 3011, 4000; U.S. census tract 18000, blocks 1003, 1004, 1005, 1006, 1007, 1008, 1009, 1010, 1011, 1012, 1013, 1014, 1015, 1016, 1017, 1018, 1019, 1020, 1021, 1022, 1023, 1024, 1025, 1026, 1027, 1028, 1029, 1030, 1031, 1032, 1033, 1034, 1035, 1036, 1037, 1038, 1039, 1040, 1041, 1042, 1043, 1044, 1045, 1046, 1047, 1048, 1049, 1050, 1051, 1052, 1053, 1054, 1055, 1056, 1057, 1058, 1059, 1060, 1061, 1062, 1063, 1064, 1065, 1066, 1067, 1068, 1069, 1070, 1071, 1072, 1073, 1074, 1075, 1076, 1077, 1078, 1079, 1080, 1081, 1082, 1083, 1084, 1086; U.S. census tract 18100, blocks 1004, 1005, 1006, 1007, 1008, 1009, 1010, 1011, 1012, 1013, 1014, 1015, 1016, 1017, 1018, 1019, 1020, 2000, 2001, 2002, 2003, 2004, 2005, 2006, 2007, 2008, 2009, 2010, 2011, 2012, 2013; U.S. census tract 18200, blocks 1000, 1001, 1002, 1003, 1004, 1005, 1006, 1007, 1008, 1009, 1010, 1011, 1012, 1013, 2002, 2003, 2004, 2005, 2006, 2007, 2008, 2009, 2010, 2011, 2012, 2013, 2014, 2015, 2016, 2017, 2018, 2019; U.S. census tract 18300, blocks 1000, 1001, 1002, 1003, 1004, 1005, 1006, 1007, 1008, 1009, 1010, 1011, 1012, 1013, 2000, 2001, 2002, 2003, 2004, 2005, 2006, 2007, 2008, 2009, 2010, 3000, 3001, 3002, 3003, 3004, 3005, 3006, 3007, 3008, 3009; U.S. census tract 18400, blocks 1000, 1001, 1002, 1003, 1004, 1005, 1006, 1007, 1008, 1009, 1010, 2000, 2001, 2002, 2004, 2005, 2006, 2007, 2008, 2009, 2010, 2011; U.S. census tract 18500, blocks 1029, 1030, 1031, 1032, 1033, 1034, 1035, 1036, 1037, 1038, 2000, 2001, 2002, 2003, 2004, 2005, 2006, 2007, 2008, 2009, 2010, 2011, 2012, 2013, 2014, 2015; U.S. census tract 20600, blocks 1000, 1001, 1002, 1003, 1004, 1005, 1006, 1007, 1008, 1009, 1010, 1011, 1012, 1013, 1014, 1015, 1016, 1017, 1018, 1019, 1020, 1021, 1022, 1023, 1024, 1025, 1026, 1027, 1028, 1029, 2000, 2001, 2002, 2003, 2004, 2005, 2006, 2007, 2008, 2009, 2010, 2011, 2012, 2013, 2014, 2015, 2016, 2017, 2018, 2019; U.S. census tract 20700, blocks 1000, 1001, 1002, 1003, 1004, 1005, 1006, 1007, 1008, 1009, 1010, 1011, 1012, 1013, 1014, 2000, 2001, 2002, 2003, 2004, 2005, 2006, 2007, 3000, 3001, 3002, 3003, 3004, 3005, 3006, 3007, 3008, 3009, 3010, 3011, 3012, 3013, 3014, 3015, 3016, 4000, 4001, 4002, 4003, 4004, 4005, 4006, 4007, 4008, 4009, 5000, 5001, 5002, 5003, 5004, 5005, 5006, 5007, 6000, 6001, 6002, 6003, 6004, 6005, 6006, 6007, 6008, 6009, 6010; U.S. census tract 20800, blocks 1000, 1001, 1002, 1003, 1004, 1005, 1006, 1007, 2000, 2001, 2002, 2003, 2004, 2005, 2006, 2007, 2008, 2009, 2010, 3000, 3001, 3002, 3003, 3004, 3005, 3006, 3007, 3008, 3009, 3010, 3011, 3012, 3013, 4002, 4003, 4004, 4005, 4006, 4007, 4008, 4009, 4010, 4011, 5000, 5001, 5002, 5003, 5004, 5005, 5006, 5007; U.S. census tract 20900, blocks 1000, 1001, 1002, 1003, 1004, 1005, 1006, 1007, 1008, 1009, 1010, 2000, 2001, 2002, 2003, 2004, 2005, 2006, 2007, 2008, 2009, 3000, 3001, 3002, 3003, 3004, 3005, 3006, 3007, 3008; U.S. census tract 21000, blocks 1001, 1002, 1003, 1004, 1005, 1006, 1007, 1008, 1009, 1010, 2000, 2001, 2002, 2003, 2004, 2005, 2006, 2007, 2008, 2009, 2010; U.S. census tract 21100, blocks 1000, 1001, 1002, 1003, 1004, 1005, 1006, 1007, 1008, 1009, 1010, 1011, 1012, 1013, 1014, 1015, 1016, 1017, 1018, 1019, 1020, 1021, 1022, 1023, 1024; U.S. census tract 21200, blocks 1000, 1001, 1002, 1003, 1004, 1005, 1006, 1007, 1008, 1009, 1010, 1011, 1012, 1013, 1014, 1015, 1016, 1017, 2000, 2001, 2002, 2003, 2004, 2006; U.S. census tract 21600, blocks 1000, 1001, 1002, 1003, 1004, 1005, 1006, 1007, 1008, 1014, 1015, 1016, 1017, 1018, 1019; U.S. census tract 21700, blocks 1000, 1001, 1002, 1003, 1004, 1005, 1006, 1007, 1008, 1009, 1010, 2000, 2001, 2002, 2003, 2004, 2005, 2006, 2007, 2008, 2009, 2010, 2011, 2012, 2013, 2014, 2015, 2016, 2017, 2018, 2019, 2020, 2021, 2022, 3000, 3001, 3002, 3003, 3004, 3005, 3006, 3007, 3008, 3009, 3010, 3011, 3012, 3013, 3014, 3015, 3016, 3017, 4000, 4001, 4002, 4003, 4004, 4005, 4006, 4007, 4008, 4009, 4010, 4011, 4012, 5000, 5001, 5002, 5003, 5004, 5005, 5006, 5007, 5008, 5009, 5010, 5011, 5012, 5013, 5014, 5015, 5016, 5017, 5018, 5019, 5020, 5021, 5022, 5023, 5024, 5025, 5026, 5027, 5028; U.S. census tract 21800, blocks 1000, 1001, 1002, 1003, 1004, 1005, 1006, 1007, 2000, 2001, 2002, 2003, 2004, 2005, 2006, 2007, 3000, 3002, 3003, 3004, 3005, 3006, 3007, 3008, 3009, 3010, 3011, 3012, 3013, 3014; U.S. census tract 120502, block 3028; U.S. census tract 160100, block 4000; U.S. census tract 185200, block 1028; U.S. census tract 186600, blocks 1000, 1001; U.S. census tract 186900, blocks 1000, 1001, 1002; U.S. census tract 187000, blocks 1000, 1001, 1002, 1003, 1004, 1005, 1006, 1007, 1008, 1009, 1010, 1011, 1012, 1013, 1014, 1015, 1016, 2000, 2001, 2002, 2003, 2004, 2005, 3000, 3001, 3002, 3003; U.S. census tract 187300, blocks 1000, 1001, 1002, 1003, 1004, 1005, 1006, 1009, 1010, 3009, 3010, 3011, 3012, 3013, 3014, 3015, 3026, 3027, 3028, 3029, 3030; U.S. census tract 187400, blocks 1000, 1001, 1002, 1003, 1004, 1005, 1006, 1007, 1008, 1009, 1010, 1011, 1012, 1013, 1014, 1015, 1016, 1017, 1018, 1019, 1020, 1021, 1022, 1023, 1024, 1027, 1028, 1029, 1030, 1031, 1032, 1033, 1034, 1035, 1036, 1037, 1038, 1039, 1040, 1041, 1042, 1043, 1044, 1045, 1046, 1047, 1048, 1049, 1050, 1051, 1052, 1053, 1054, 1055, 1056, 1057, 1058, 1059, 1068, 1069, 1070, 1071, 1072, 1073, 1074, 1075, 1076, 1077, 1078, 1079, 1080, 1081, 1102, 1103; U.S. census tract 980000, blocks 1002, 1003, 1004, 1005, 1006, 1007, 1010, 1011, 1012, 1013, 1014, 1015, 1016, 1017, 1018, 1019, 1020, 1021, 1022, 1023, 1025, 1026, 1027, 1028, 1029, 1030, 1031, 1034
Chris Larson (Milwaukee)	Democratic	Re-elected in 2014, 2018.	January 3, 2011 – Current	102nd 103rd 104th 105th	
Chris Larson (Milwaukee)	Democratic	Re-elected in 2022.	January 3, 2011 – Current	106th	Southeast Milwaukee County
Chris Larson (Milwaukee)	Democratic	Re-elected in 2022.	January 3, 2011 – Current	107th	Southeast Milwaukee County
Chris Larson (Milwaukee)	Democratic	Re-elected in 2026.	January 3, 2011 – Current	108th	Southeast Milwaukee County

== See also ==
- Political subdivisions of Wisconsin
