= Wisconsin's 20th Assembly district =

American legislative district in Milwaukee County, Wisconsin

Wisconsin's 20th State Assembly district
- 2024 map defined in 2023 Wisc. Act 94; 2022 map defined in Johnson v. Wisconsin Elections Commission; 2011 map was defined in 2011 Wisc. Act 43
Assemblymember
Christine Sinicki; D–Milwaukee
since January 4, 1999 (27 years)
- Demographics: 80.59% White; 4.04% Black; 10.82% Hispanic; 5.52% Asian; 1.4% Native American; 0.18% Hawaiian/Pacific Islander
- Population (2020) • Voting age: 59,200; 48,163
- Website: Official website
- Notes: Milwaukee metro area (south side)

The 20th Assembly district of Wisconsin is one of 99 districts in the Wisconsin State Assembly. Located in southeastern Wisconsin, the district is entirely contained in southeastern Milwaukee County. It comprises the suburban cities of Cudahy, South Milwaukee, and St. Francis, and some of the far south side of the city of Milwaukee including the Fernwood neighborhood and part of the Bay View neighborhood. The district also contains Saint Francis de Sales Seminary, Sheridan Park, and about half of the Oak Creek Parkway. The district is represented by Democrat Christine Sinicki, since January 1999.

The 20th Assembly district is located within Wisconsin's 7th Senate district, along with the 19th and 21st Assembly districts.

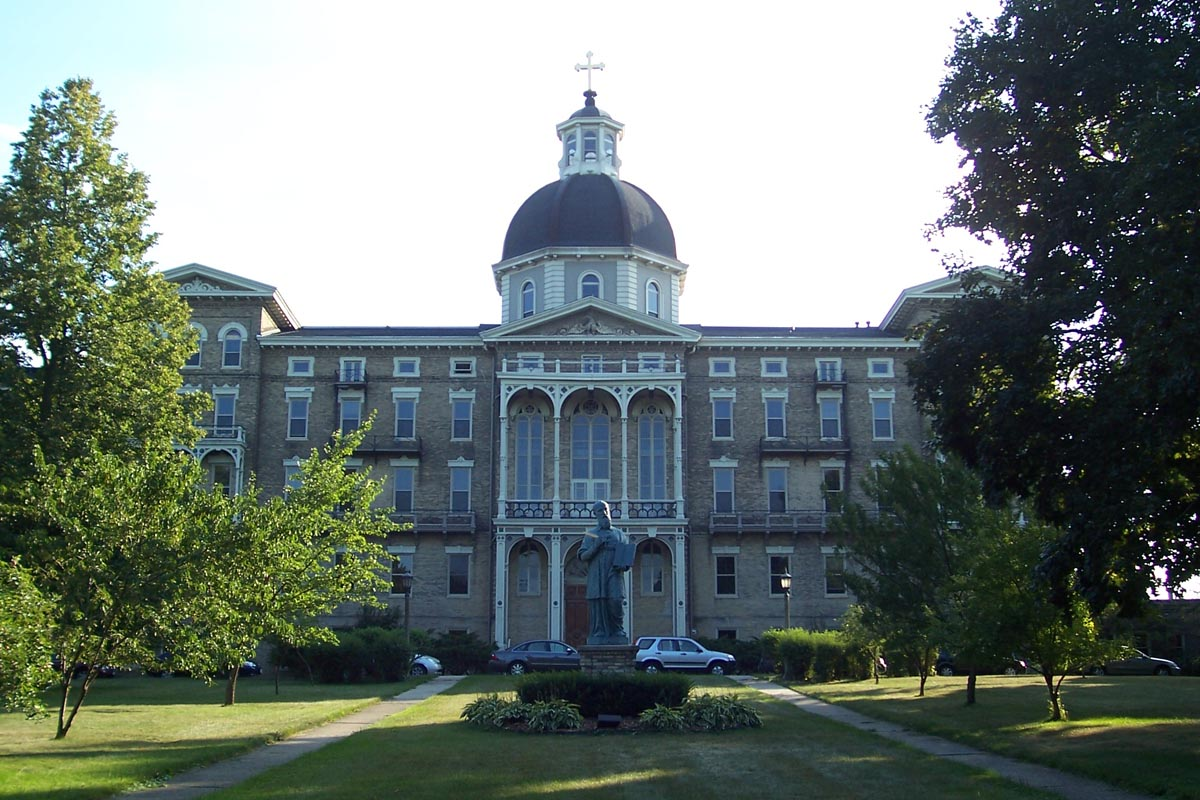
Saint Francis de Sales Seminary

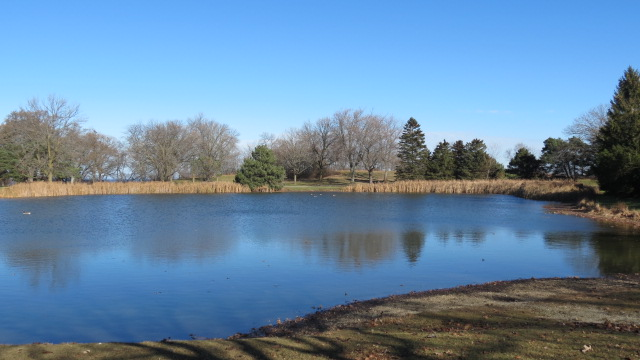
Pond in Sheridan Park, in Cudahy

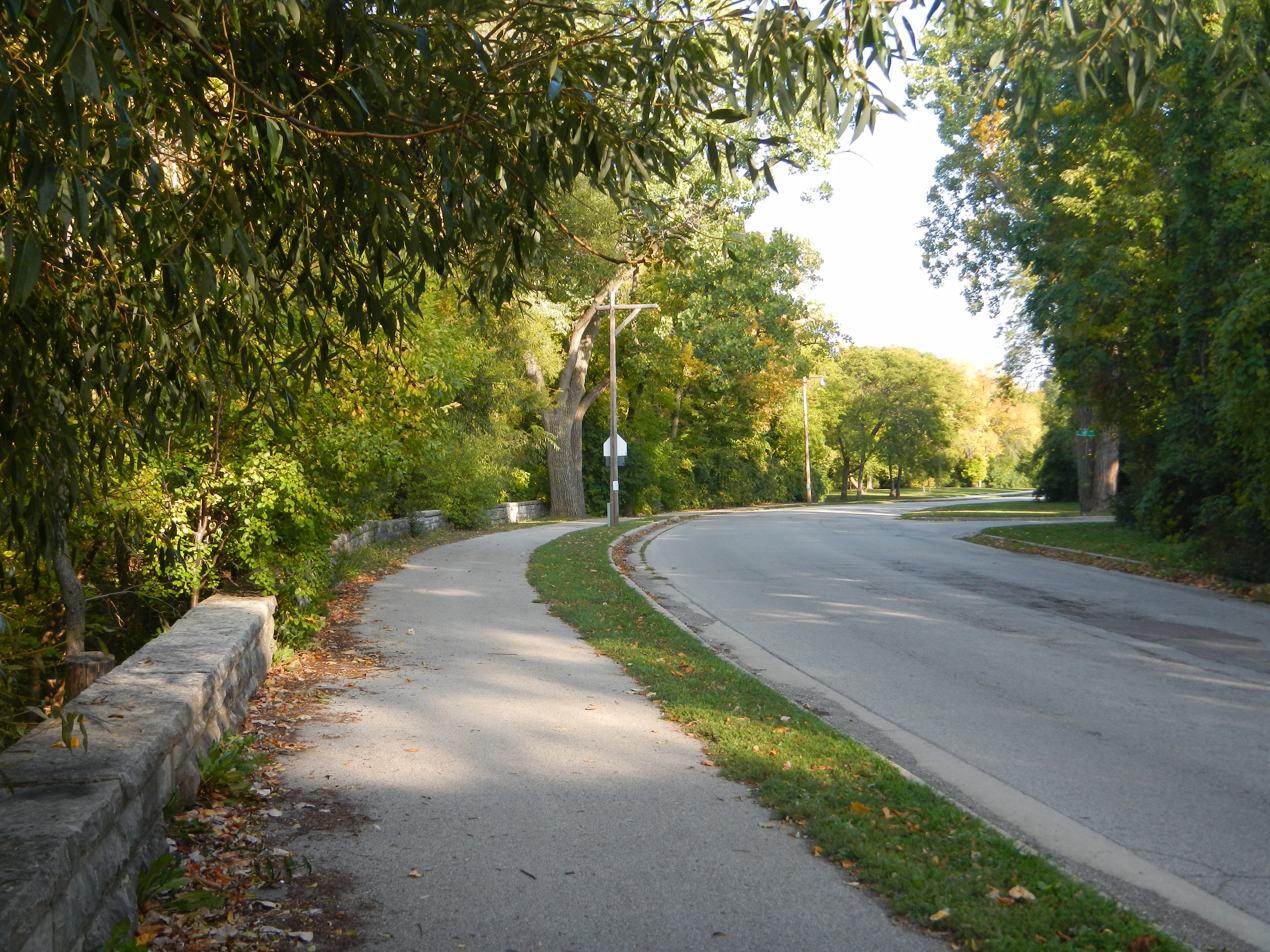
Section of Oak Creek Parkway in South Milwaukee

== List of past representatives ==
List of representatives to the Wisconsin State Assembly from the 20th district
Member	Party	Residence	Counties represented	Term start	Term end	Ref.
District created
John Plewa	Dem.	Milwaukee	Milwaukee	January 1, 1973	January 3, 1983	
James F. Rooney	Dem.	Racine	Racine	January 3, 1983	January 7, 1985	
Tim Carpenter	Dem.	Milwaukee	Milwaukee	January 7, 1985	January 4, 1993	
Rosemary Potter	Dem.	Milwaukee	Milwaukee	January 4, 1993	January 4, 1999	
Christine Sinicki	Dem.	Milwaukee	Milwaukee	January 4, 1999	Current	
