= Gabriel Zophy =

American politician

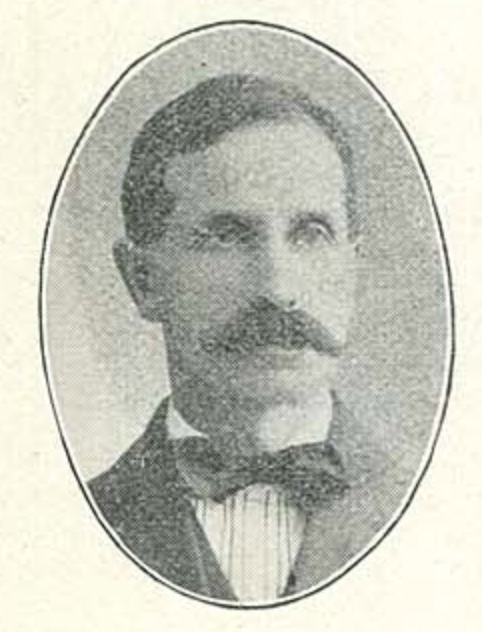
Gabriel Zophy, Swiss-born Wisconsin carpenter, contractor and Socialist politician

Gabriel Zophy (April 17, 1869 – September 9, 1947) was an American carpenter, building contractor, and Socialist from West Allis who served one term (1911–1914) as a member of the Wisconsin State Senate representing the Milwaukee County-based 7th Senate district (14th and 17th wards of the city of Milwaukee; the towns of Franklin, Greenfield, Lake, Oak Creek and Wauwatosa); cities of South Milwaukee, Wauwatosa, West Allis and Cudahy and the village of West Milwaukee).

== Background ==
Zophy was born on April 17, 1869, in Schwanden, Glarus, Switzerland. He came to the United States with his parents in 1870 to Juda, Wisconsin (in Green County), where he attended the public schools in winter and worked on farms in the summer. In 1885 he moved to Milwaukee where he learned the trade of carpentry, worked as a journeyman until 1894, when he engaged in the business of contracting and building which he since followed. He located In West Allis in 1901 before its incorporation as a village and took an active interest In public affairs. He became village trustee in 1903 serving one term. Later he was appointed school commissioner.

== Senate career ==
He was a member of the state Central Committee of the Social Democratic Party (as the party was still known in Wisconsin) from West Allis in 1910 when he was elected to the Senate (replacing Republican George E. Page) with 4,344 votes, to 3,864 for Republican George G. Brew (nominally a Progressive, but suspected of stalwart tendencies) and 3374 for Democrat Benjamin Steinel, and was assigned to the Senate's standing committee on State Affairs.

He was succeeded in the 1914 election by fellow Socialist Louis A. Arnold (with whom he later served on the board of directors of the Commonwealth Mutual Savings Bank, a Socialist-led institution, along with Charles B. Whitnall). He also served as vice-president of the bank.

Zophy died of a heart attack in 1947.
