= Barney Augustus Eaton =

American politician from Wisconsin

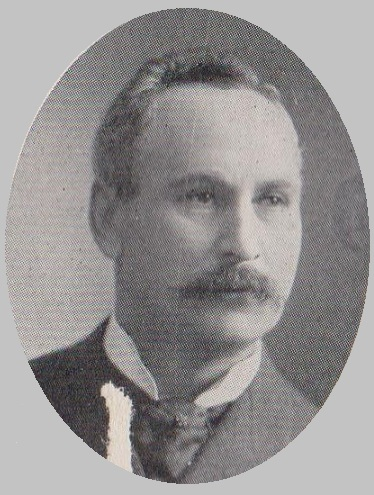

Member of the Wisconsin Senate from the 7th district
- In office 1899–1907
- Succeeded by: George E. Page

Wisconsin State Assembly
- In office 1895–1898

Personal details
- Born: October 29, 1853 Lake, Wisconsin
- Died: January 8, 1936 (aged 82) Milwaukee, Wisconsin
- Party: Republican

Barney Augustus Eaton (1853–1936) was a politician in Wisconsin.

== Biography ==
Eaton was born on October 29, 1853, in the town of Lake, Wisconsin. He would become a fruit farmer.

== Political career ==
Eaton was a member of the Wisconsin State Assembly from 1895 to 1898, and later the Wisconsin State Senate from 1899 to 1907. Additionally, he had been president of the village of Cudahy, Wisconsin, from 1895 to 1896, and president of the Cudahy School Board in 1895. He also served as the director of the Lake Fire Insurance Company for six years. He was a Republican.

He died on January 8, 1936, in Milwaukee. He is buried in Forest Home Cemetery, in Milwaukee.
