= George E. Page =

American politician (1873–1959)

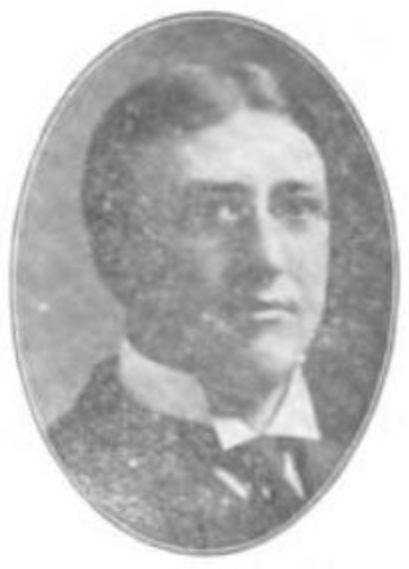

Member of the Wisconsin Senate from the 7th district
- In office January 7, 1907 – January 2, 1911
- Preceded by: Barney Augustus Eaton
- Succeeded by: Gabriel Zophy

Member of the Wisconsin State Assembly from the Milwaukee 3rd district
- In office January 2, 1905 – January 7, 1907
- Preceded by: Herman W. Waterman
- Succeeded by: William Disch

Personal details
- Born: March 19, 1873 Milwaukee, Wisconsin, U.S.
- Died: February 25, 1959 (aged 85) Milwaukee, Wisconsin, U.S.
- Resting place: Wisconsin Memorial Park, Brookfield, Wisconsin
- Party: Republican
- Spouse: Alma L. Volmer (m. 1898; died 1942)
- Children: George Edgar Page Jr.^{(b. 1898; died 1965)}; Merrill Justin Page^{(b. 1900; died 1952)}
- Education: Columbian University
- Profession: Lawyer

George Edgar Page Sr. (March 19, 1873 – February 25, 1959) was an American lawyer, judge, and Republican politician from Milwaukee County, Wisconsin. He was a member of the Wisconsin Senate (1907–1911) and State Assembly (1905–1907), representing the southern quarter of Milwaukee County.

== Background ==
Page was born in the city of Milwaukee on March 19, 1873, and was educated in the public schools of Milwaukee. He continuously resided there. He was elected to the office of justice of the peace for the 17th ward in 1900, but resigned the same year to enter the Law Department of the Columbian University in Washington, D.C. (later George Washington University Law School). Page graduated in 1903 and was admitted to the bar in the same year. He then served as Milwaukee District Court judge for twenty-four years. Page died in a hospital at age 85 in Milwaukee, Wisconsin, on February 25, 1959.

== Legislative career ==
Page was elected to the Assembly in 1904 and as state senator in 1906, receiving 4,250 votes against 2,603 for Anthony Szczerbinski (Democrat) and 2,737 for W. L. Hamann (Social Democrat). He was succeeded by Socialist Gabriel Zophy following the 1910 Socialist sweep of Milwaukee County offices.

Wisconsin State Assembly
Preceded by Herman W. Waterman	Member of the Wisconsin State Assembly from the Milwaukee 3rd district January 2, 1905 – January 7, 1907	Succeeded by William Disch
Wisconsin Senate
Preceded by Barney Augustus Eaton	Member of the Wisconsin Senate from the 7thdistrict January 7, 1907 – January 2, 1911	Succeeded by Gabriel Zophy
