= George G. Brew =

American politician

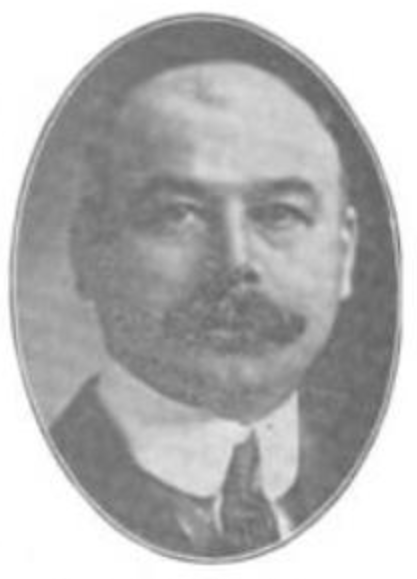

Member of the Wisconsin State Assembly from the 50th district
- In office 1908–1910
- Preceded by: Elmer E. Cain
- Succeeded by: Charles B. Perry

Personal details
- Born: 1868 Milwaukee, Wisconsin
- Died: January 31, 1937 (aged 68)
- Party: Republican
- Education: Spencerian Business College

George G. Brew (1868 – January 31, 1937) was a member of the Wisconsin State Assembly.

== Biography ==
Brew was born in Milwaukee, Wisconsin in 1868. He later moved to Greenfield, Wisconsin. He died on January 31, 1937.

== Career ==
Brew was elected to the Assembly in 1908. In 1910, he was a candidate for the Wisconsin State Senate, losing to Gabriel Zophy. Additionally, Brew was Village President (similar to Mayor) of West Milwaukee, Wisconsin. He was a Republican.
