= Edward B. Simpson =

American politician

Edward Bayles Simpson (November 21, 1835 – January 12, 1915) was a member of the Wisconsin State Assembly and the Wisconsin State Senate. He was born in Upper Canada, and settled in Princeton, Wisconsin in 1849 and Milwaukee, Wisconsin in 1861, where he was involved in the lumber business. Simpson was a member of the Assembly in 1879 and 1880. He had previously been an unsuccessful candidate for the Assembly twice. In 1881 and 1882, Simpson represented the 7th District in the Senate. Other positions he held include Town Clerk, Assessor and Treasurer of Princeton. He was a Republican.
