= William Wallace Johnson =

American politician

William Wallace Johnson (1813-1900) was a member of the Wisconsin State Assembly.

== Biography ==
Johnson was born on November 29, 1813, in Buckland, Massachusetts. The eighth child (of thirteen children) and second son of Capt. Othniel and Anna (Elmer) Johnson.

On October 24, 1838, Johnson married Abigail Clark (1812-1889). They would have six children between 1841 and 1849 (five of whom reached adulthood). On May 17, 1842, he and his family settled in Greenfield in Wisconsin Territory.

Johnson was a school board member (1842-1848) and a teacher in the Greenfield township and constructed with his own hands the Honey Creek School in 1843 and the Johnson School in 1847. He also served as Town Treasurer (1847-1848) and Town Clerk (1848-1855). In 1859, he was ordained a minister of the Methodist Episcopal Church. Also, from 1849 to 1900 he was Secretary of Honey Creek Cemetery Association.

He was also an enumerator during the 1880 U.S. Census.

Johnson died on September 6, 1900, in Greenfield, Wisconsin, and he is buried in Honey Creek Cemetery in West Allis, Wisconsin.

Johnson was the grandfather of painter Frank Tenney Johnson (1874-1939).

== Election to the Assembly ==
In the 1878 general election, Johnson ran as a Republican and would finish tied for first place with the Democratic candidate, Michael J. Egan, ahead of two others. A special election between Johnson and Egan was ordered by Governor William E. Smith. Johnson would emerge as the winner.
