= Thomas O'Neill (Wisconsin politician) =

American politician

Thomas O'Neill was a member of the Wisconsin State Assembly.

== Biography ==
O'Neill was born on June 21, 1821, in Dublin, Ireland. He settled in what is now the City of Greenfield, Wisconsin, in 1847. On February 12, 1874, in Milwaukee, he married Mary Reynolds, in a Catholic ceremony at St Gall's Church.

== Career ==
O'Neill was a member of the Wisconsin State Assembly during the 1875 session.
