= Christine Sinicki =

21st century American politician (born 1960)

Member of the Wisconsin State Assembly from the 20th district
- Incumbent
- Assumed office January 4, 1999
- Preceded by: Rosemary Potter

Chair of the Democratic Party of Milwaukee County
- In office 2021 – January 1, 2026
- Preceded by: Christopher Walton
- Succeeded by: Brett Timmerman

Personal details
- Born: Christine Harling; March 28, 1960 (age 66) Milwaukee, Wisconsin, U.S.
- Party: Democratic
- Spouse: Michael Sinicki
- Children: 2
- Occupation: politician
- Website: Official website

Christine M. Sinicki (née Harling; born March 28, 1960) is an American Democratic politician from Milwaukee, Wisconsin. She is a member of the Wisconsin State Assembly, representing the 20th Assembly district in southeast Milwaukee County since 1999. She is also chair of the Democratic Party of Milwaukee County, since 2021.

== Early life and career ==
Christine Sinicki was born Christine Harling in Milwaukee, Wisconsin. She was raised in Milwaukee's Bay View neighborhood and is a graduate of Bay View High School. After graduation, Sinicki worked as a waitress until becoming manager of a small business in Bay View. As a mother, she became involved in parent–teacher association meetings and was eventually elected president.

== Political career ==
Her involvement with the PTA, led her to run for a seat on the Milwaukee School Board, where she served until her election to the assembly.

In 1998, with the retirement of Democratic incumbent Rosemary Potter, Sinicki decided to jump into the race for Wisconsin State Assembly to succeed her. Sinicki didn't face a Democratic primary opponent, and easily prevailed over her Republican opponent in the general election, taking 60% of the vote. She is currently serving her 14th term representing this district.

In the Assembly, she currently serves on the committees on Labor and Integrated Employment, on Workforce Development, on Forestry, Parks and Outdoor Recreation, on Veterans and Military Affairs, and on State Affairs. She was chosen as Democratic caucus secretary for the 2001–2002 session, and as minority caucus sergeant-at-arms for the 2019–2020 session. She was selected as a Wisconsin delegate to the 2000 Democratic National Convention and was a presidential elector for Al Gore.

== Personal life ==
Sinicki and her husband, Michael, have two adult children. They reside in Bay View.

== Electoral history ==
=== Wisconsin Assembly (1998–present) ===
Year	Election	Date	Elected				Defeated				Total	Plurality
1998	General	Nov. 3	Christine Sinicki	Democratic	9,845	60.45%	Bryan J. Olen	Rep.	6,402	39.31%	16,286	3,443
2000	General	Nov. 7	Christine M. Sinicki	Democratic	17,436	98.57%	--Unopposed--				17,689	17,183
2002	Primary	Sep. 10	Christine M. Sinicki (inc)	Democratic	4,954	58.43%	Chris Pawlak	Dem.	3,512	41.42%	8,479	1,442
2002	General	Nov. 5	Christine M. Sinicki (inc)	Democratic	12,616	98.05%	--Unopposed--				12,867	12,365
2004	General	Nov. 2	Christine M. Sinicki (inc)	Democratic	17,285	61.20%	Bruce Schuknecht	Rep.	10,905	38.61%	28,242	6,380
2006	General	Nov. 7	Christine M. Sinicki (inc)	Democratic	15,682	98.36%	--Unopposed--				15,944	15,420
2008	Primary	Sep. 9	Christine M. Sinicki (inc)	Democratic	2,113	61.95%	Philip Landowski	Dem.	807	23.66%	3,411	1,306
2008	Primary	Sep. 9	Christine M. Sinicki (inc)	Democratic	2,113	61.95%	Steven Sutherland	Dem.	487	14.28%	3,411	1,306
2008	General	Nov. 4	Christine M. Sinicki (inc)	Democratic	19,917	98.22%	--Unopposed--				20,277	19,557
2010	General	Nov. 2	Christine M. Sinicki (inc)	Democratic	10,844	53.18%	Molly M. McGartland	Rep.	9,503	46.60%	20,391	1,341
2012	General	Nov. 6	Christine M. Sinicki (inc)	Democratic	16,995	57.52%	Molly M. McGartland	Rep.	12,500	42.31%	29,546	4,495
2014	General	Nov. 4	Christine M. Sinicki (inc)	Democratic	13,400	56.02%	Molly M. McGartland	Rep.	10,481	43.81%	23,922	2,919
2016	Primary	Aug. 9	Christine M. Sinicki (inc)	Democratic	3,530	59.64%	Julie Meyer	Dem.	2,374	40.11%	5,919	1,156
2016	General	Nov. 8	Christine M. Sinicki (inc)	Democratic	21,222	97.02%	--Unopposed--				21,873	20,571
2018	General	Nov. 6	Christine M. Sinicki (inc)	Democratic	20,245	96.09%	--Unopposed--				21,069	19,421
2020	General	Nov. 3	Christine M. Sinicki (inc)	Democratic	22,750	96.84%	--Unopposed--				23,492	22,008
2022	General	Nov. 8	Christine M. Sinicki (inc)	Democratic	17,863	66.32%	Scott Hermann	Rep.	9,043	33.57%	26,936	8,820
2024	General	Nov. 5	Christine M. Sinicki (inc)	Democratic	20,018	61.01%	Mike Moeller	Rep.	12,740	38.83%	32,811	7,278

Party political offices
Preceded by Christopher Walton	Chair of the Democratic Party of Milwaukee County; 2021–present	Incumbent
Wisconsin State Assembly
Preceded by Rosemary Potter	Member of the Wisconsin State Assembly from the 20th district January 4, 1999 – present	Incumbent
