= Herman W. Waterman =

American politician

Herman W. Waterman was an American politician. He was a member of the Wisconsin State Assembly.

== Biography ==
Waterman was born on January 7, 1868, in Portland, Maine. He moved to Milwaukee, Wisconsin, in 1889.

== Career ==
Waterman was elected to the Assembly in 1902. He was a Republican.
