= Oak Creek Parkway =

- U.S. National Register of Historic Places
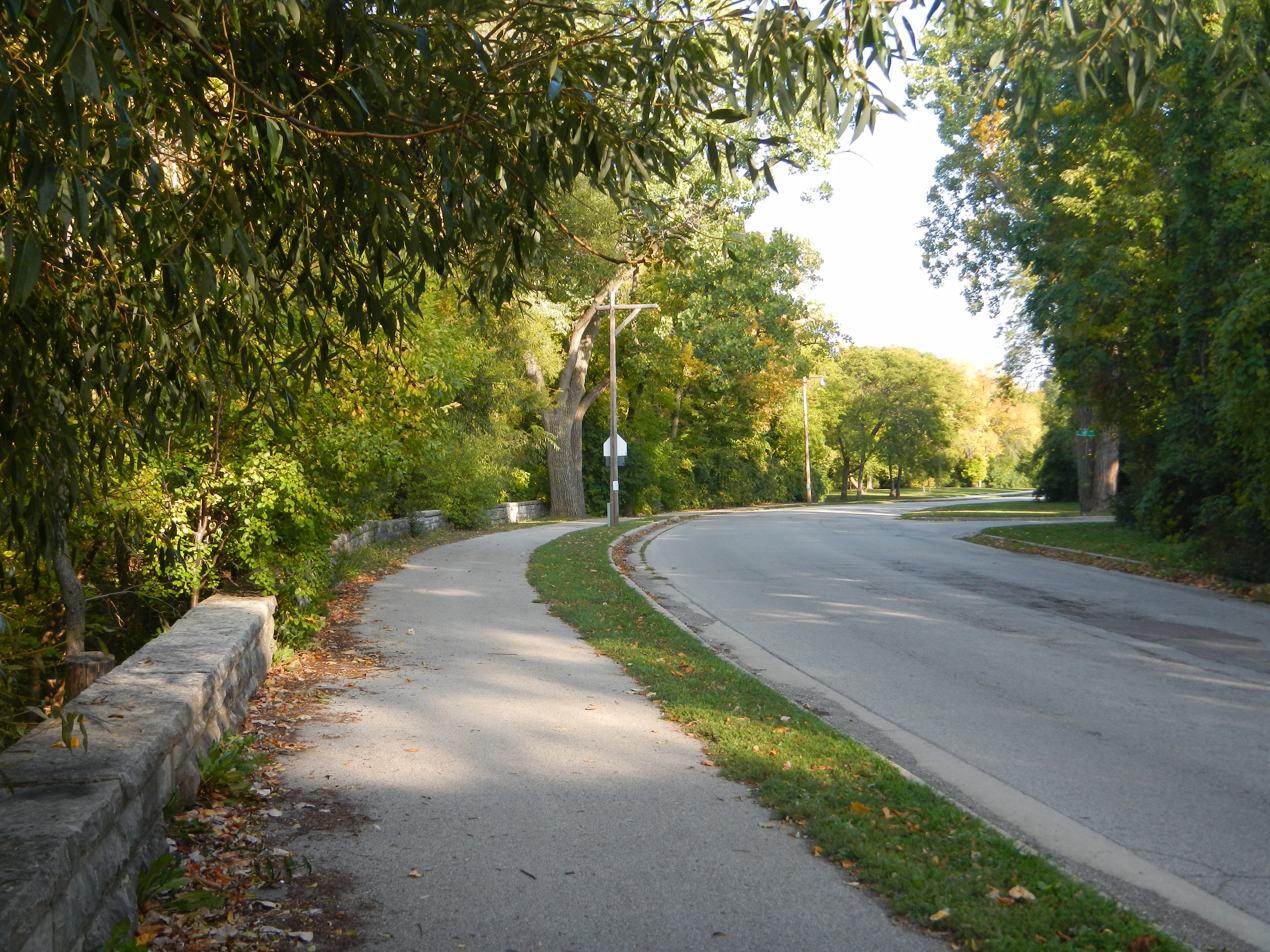
- Location: South Milwaukee, Wisconsin
- Architect: Alfred Boerner
- NRHP reference No.: 11000416
- Added to NRHP: June 27, 2011

The Oak Creek Parkway is an urban park strung along Oak Creek and other parts of South Milwaukee, Wisconsin. It was added to the National Register of Historic Places in 2011. The Oak Leaf Trail spans 135 miles and connects with the parkway at several points.

== History ==
Milwaukee landscape architect Alfred Boerner roughed out plans for the parkway in 1923, but nothing was built until 1930, when federal relief programs made resources available. The parkway was partially built by the Civilian Conservation Corps and the Works Progress Administration of the New Deal.
