= Sheridan Park =

Municipal park in Cudahy, Wisconsin, United States

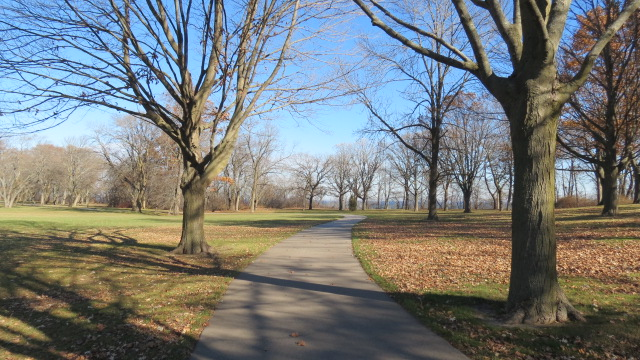
- A section of the Oak Leaf Trail in Sheridan Park
- Interactive map of Sheridan Park
- Location: Cudahy, Wisconsin
- Coordinates: 42.961105°N 87.847794°W
- Created: 1914
- Operator: Milwaukee County Parks Department
- Website: Official website

Sheridan Park is a municipal park in the city of Cudahy, Wisconsin. Situated on the shore of Lake Michigan, the park has trees, shrubs, and other plants native to this region of Wisconsin.

== History ==
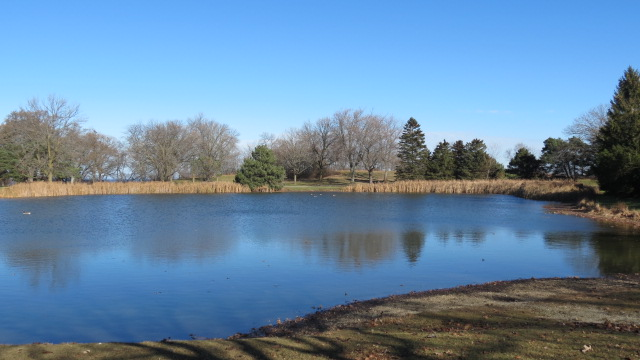
Sheridan Park pond

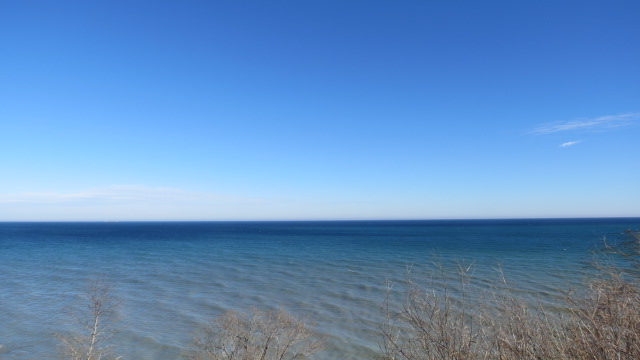
View of Lake Michigan from a bluff at Sheridan Park

The mayor of Cudahy, Wisconsin in 1913, Christ Woehsner, believed that a public park should be built on the shore of Lake Michigan. In a letter, he expressed his deep appreciation for the beauty that the area offered. The letter led to the purchase of land near the shore of Lake Michigan from the landowner, Patrick Cudahy. In 1914, the Public Park of Cudahy became an official park. In 1920, the name was changed to Sheridan Park in memory of Major-General Philip Henry Sheridan.

== Natural history ==
Sheridan Park contains distinct natural areas. There are open fields, wooded areas, bluffs, beaches, and a pond. The area along the bluff contains plant species native to this part of Wisconsin.

== Recreation ==
Adjacent to Lake Michigan, the park contains baseball/softball fields, basketball courts, tennis courts, a swimming pool, a children's playground, a picnic area, part of the Oak Leaf Trail, and a pond.

== Flora and fauna ==
- Fish: largemouth bass, panfish, Northern pike
- Birds: Canada geese, mallards
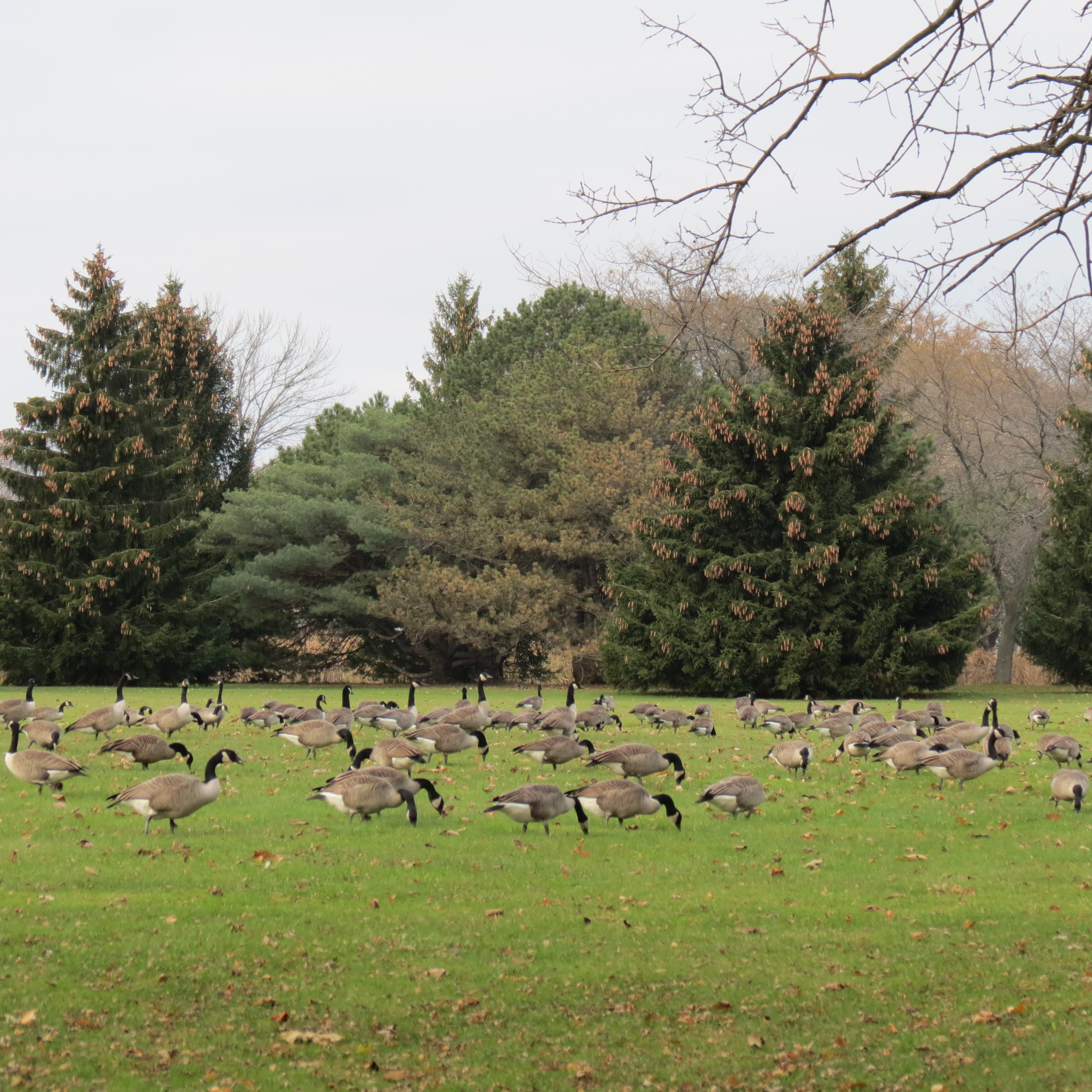
Canada geese

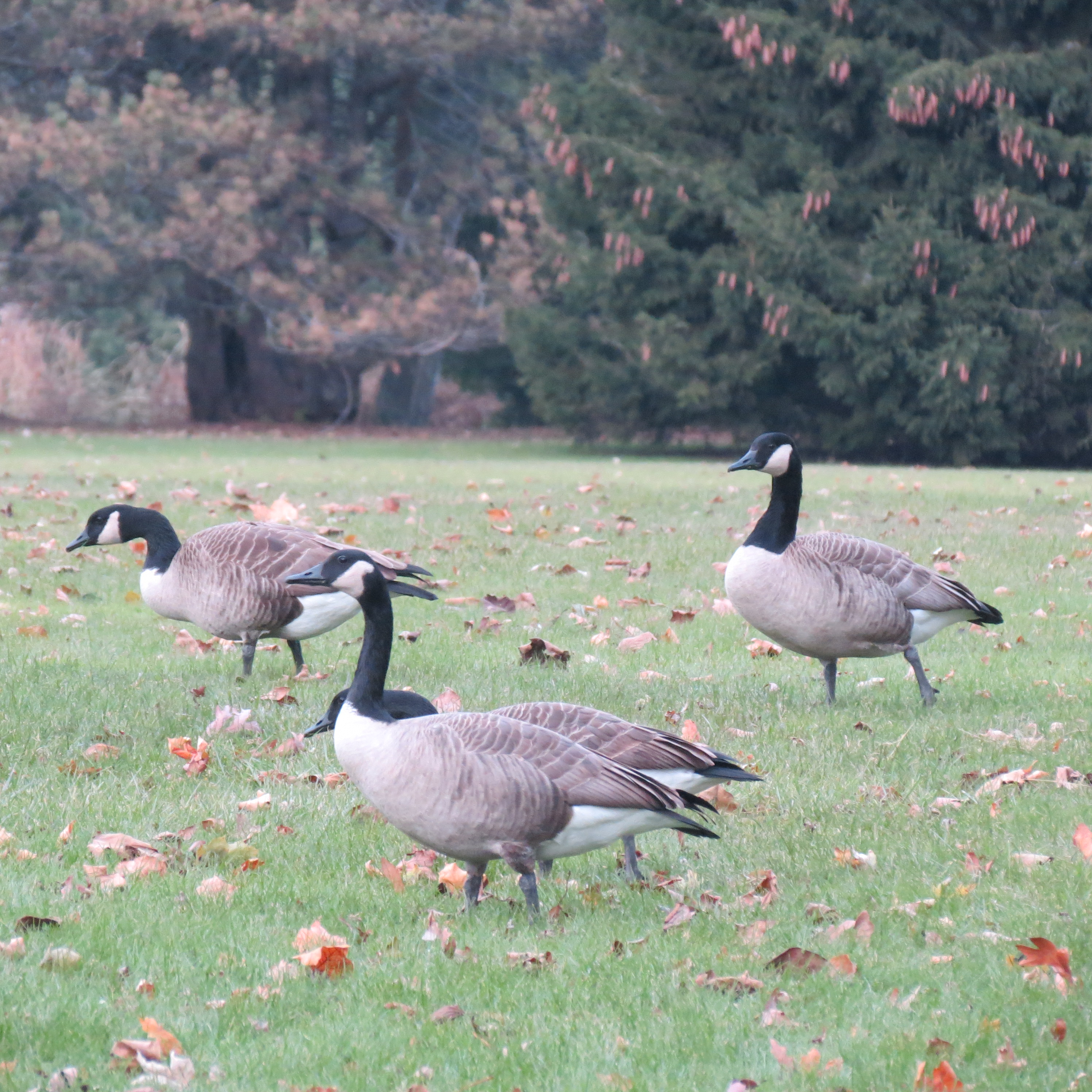
Canada geese

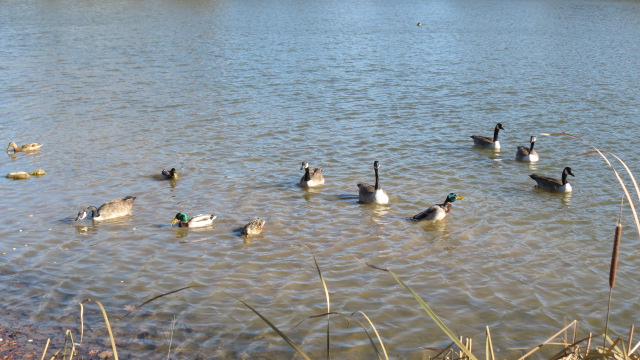
Mallards and Canada geese in Sheridan Park pond

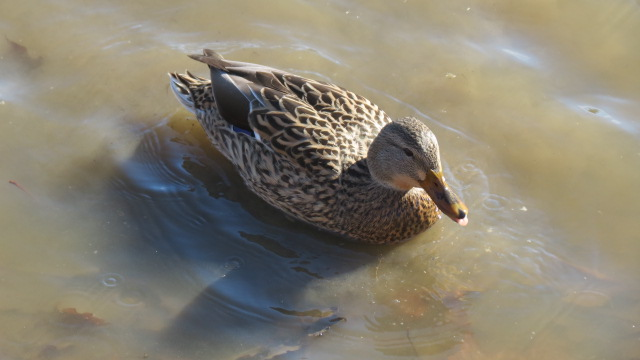
Female mallard in Sheridan Park pond
- Trees and plants: birch, red pine, spruce, staghorn sumac, red osier dogwood, rough-stemmed goldenrod, cattails, dandelion
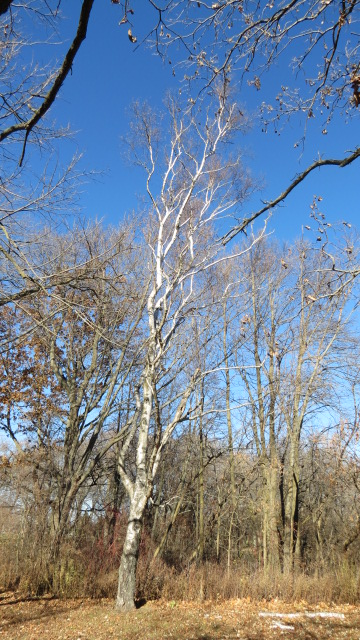
Birch tree

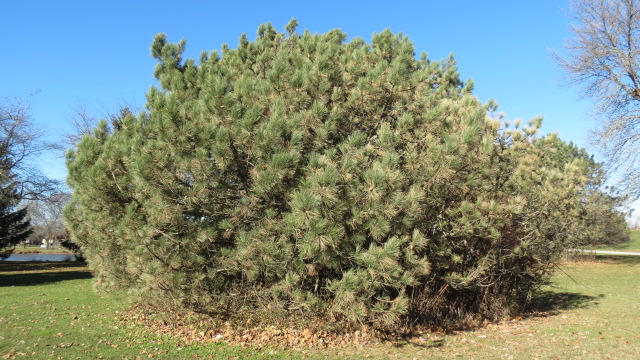
Red pine

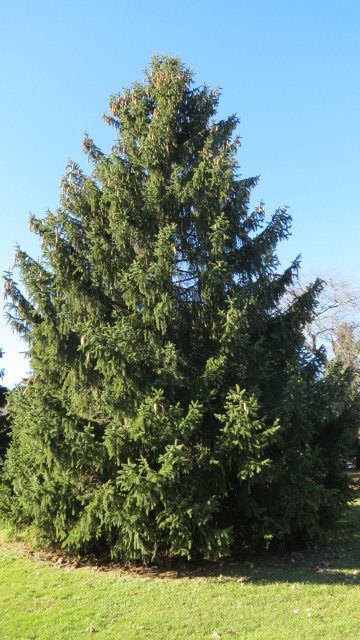
Spruce

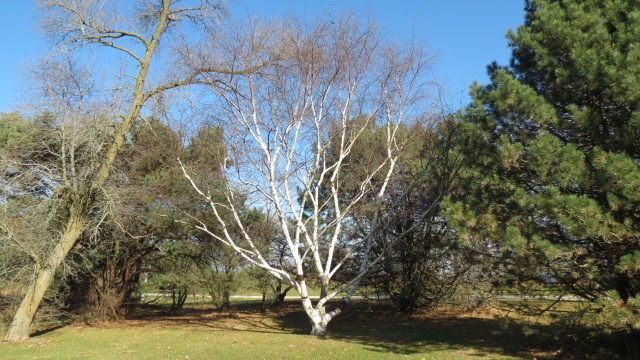
Birch tree

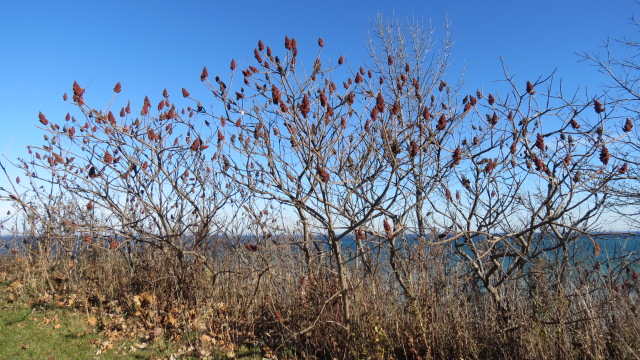
Staghorn sumac
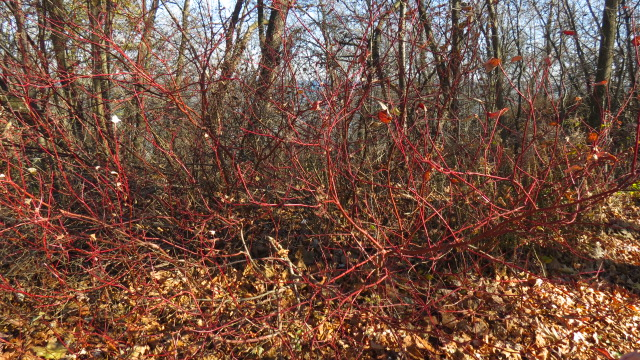
Red osier dogwood

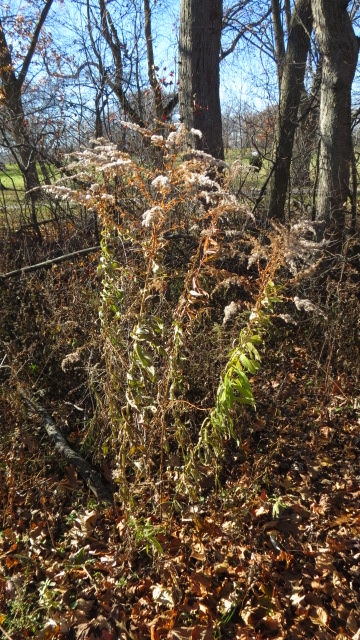
Rough-stemmed goldenrod

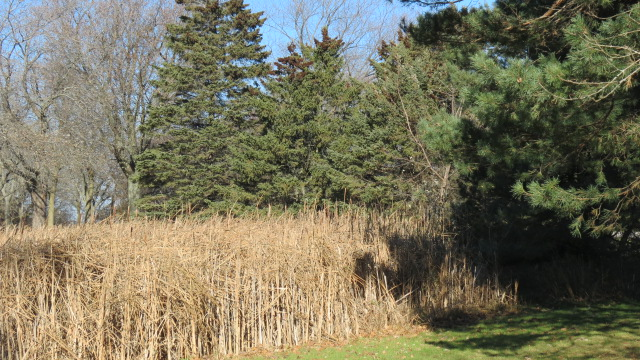
Cattails near Sheridan Park pond

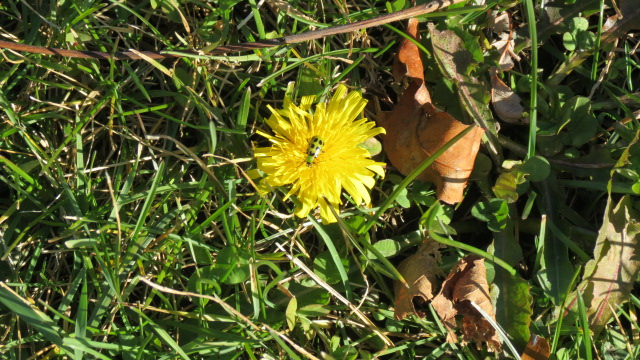
Dandelion
