= Greenfield, Wisconsin =

- City
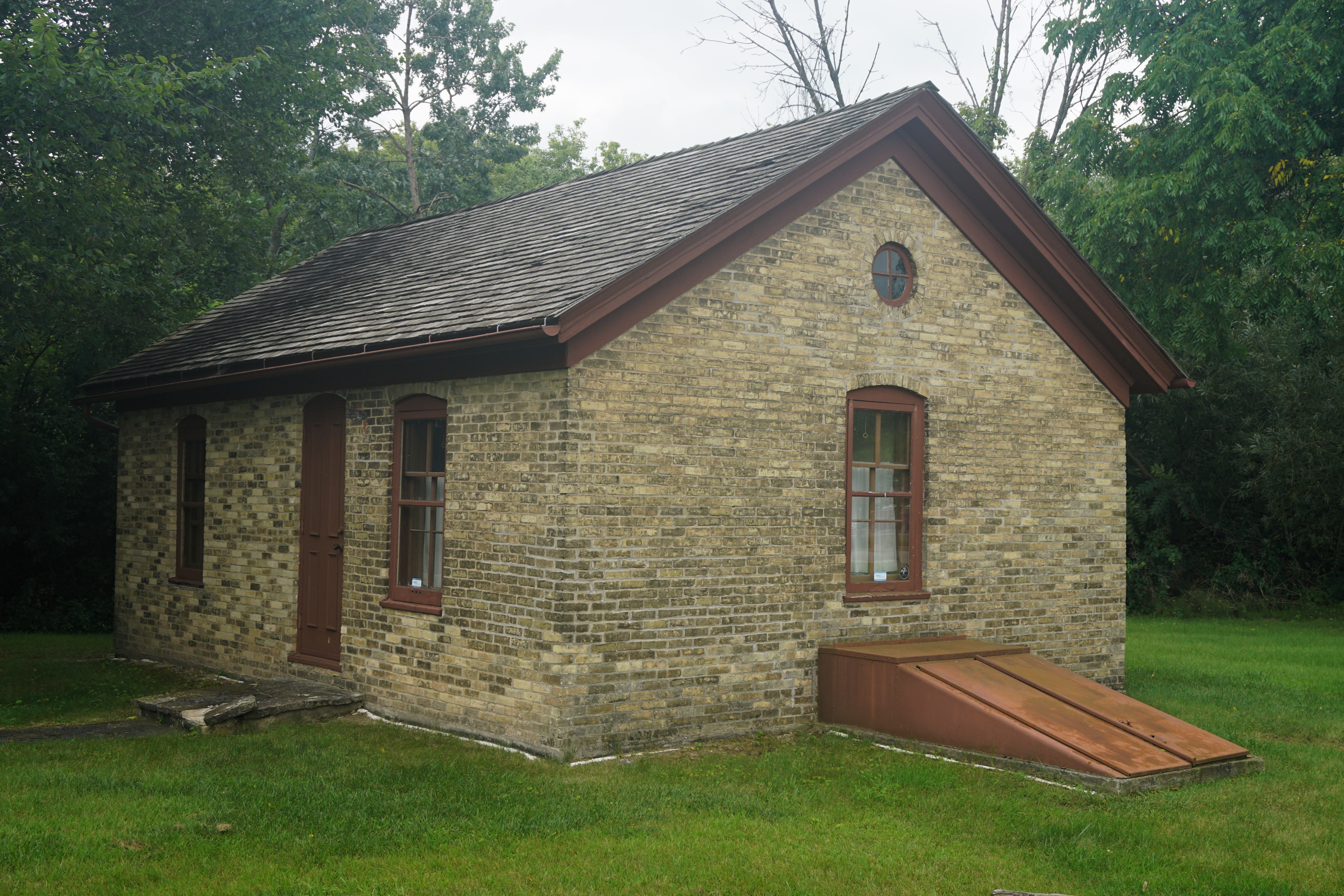
- Montag-Boogk Cream City Brick Home

- Motto: "Pledged to Progress"
- Interactive map of Greenfield, Wisconsin
- Location within Wisconsin Location within the United States
- Coordinates: 42°57′47″N 87°59′45″W
- Country: United States
- State: Wisconsin
- County: Milwaukee

Area
  - Total: 11.54 sq mi (29.88 km^{2})
  - Land: 11.53 sq mi (29.87 km^{2})
  - Water: 0.0039 sq mi (0.01 km^{2})
- Elevation: 794 ft (242 m)

Population (2020)
  - Total: 37,803
  - Estimate (2022): 37,071
  - Density: 3,278.1/sq mi (1,265.7/km^{2})
- Time zone: UTC−6 (Central (CST))
  - Summer (DST): UTC−5 (CDT)
- ZIP Code(s): 53219, 53220, 53221, 53228
- Area code: 414
- FIPS code: 55-31175
- GNIS feature ID: 1565841
- Website: www.ci.greenfield.wi.us

Greenfield is a city in Milwaukee County, Wisconsin, United States. The population was 37,803 as of the 2020 census. Greenfield is one of many bedroom communities in the Milwaukee metropolitan area.

== History ==
On March 8, 1839, the town of Kinnikennick was created by the territorial legislature, encompassing the western part of the town of Lake); and on December 20, 1839, the south portion of the town of Kinnikennick was split off to form the town of Franklin. As of the 1840 census, the population of Kinnikennick or Kinnikinnick was 404.

Postmaster Olney Harrington suggested the town be renamed to Greenfield in 1839 and in 1841 it was renamed. In 1957, Greenfield was the last municipality in Milwaukee to incorporate, by this stage being one third of its original size, after surrounding areas took parts of Greenfield when they incorporated.

== Geography ==
Greenfield is located at 42°57′47″N 87°59′45″W (42.963034, −87.995943). The Root River flows through the western part of the city.

According to the United States Census Bureau, the city has a total area of 11.52 square miles (29.84 km^{2}), of which 11.51 square miles (29.81 km^{2}; 7,366.40 acres; 2,981.08 ha) is land and 0.01 square miles (0.03 km^{2}; 6.40 acres; 2.59 ha) is water.

=== Climate ===
Greenfield

Climate chart (precipitation, max. and min. temperature)
J	F	M	A	M	J	J	A	S	O	N	D
97 −5 −11	101 −2 −10	68 6 −6	165 18 3	111 22 7	138 24 15	100 29 18	95 29 18	67 24 14	92 16 7	64 9 0	78 −2 −8
- █ Average max. and min. temperatures in °C
- █ Precipitation totals in mm
Imperial conversion
J	F	M	A	M	J	J	A	S	O	N	D
3.8 23 12	4 28 14	2.7 43 21	6.5 64 37	4.4 72 45	5.4 75 59	3.9 84 64	3.7 84 64	2.6 75 57	3.6 61 45	2.5 48 32	3.1 28 18
- █ Average max. and min. temperatures in °F
- █ Precipitation totals in inches

== Demographics ==
Historical population
Census	Pop.	Note	%±
1960	17,636		—
1970	24,424		38.5%
1980	31,353		28.4%
1990	33,403		6.5%
2000	35,476		6.2%
2010	36,720		3.5%
2020	37,803		2.9%
2022 (est.)	37,071		−1.9%
U.S. Decennial Census; 2010–2020

=== 2020 census ===
As of the 2020 census, Greenfield had a population of 37,803. The median age was 43.1 years. 17.9% of residents were under the age of 18 and 22.7% of residents were 65 years of age or older. For every 100 females there were 91.7 males, and for every 100 females age 18 and over there were 88.4 males age 18 and over.

100.0% of residents lived in urban areas, while 0.0% lived in rural areas.

There were 17,343 households in Greenfield, of which 22.2% had children under the age of 18 living in them. Of all households, 39.9% were married-couple households, 20.2% were households with a male householder and no spouse or partner present, and 31.4% were households with a female householder and no spouse or partner present. About 37.6% of all households were made up of individuals and 16.7% had someone living alone who was 65 years of age or older.

There were 18,035 housing units, of which 3.8% were vacant. The homeowner vacancy rate was 0.9% and the rental vacancy rate was 4.0%.

Racial composition as of the 2020 census
Race	Number	Percent
White	28,604	75.7%
Black or African American	1,590	4.2%
American Indian and Alaska Native	245	0.6%
Asian	2,271	6.0%
Native Hawaiian and Other Pacific Islander	9	0.0%
Some other race	1,819	4.8%
Two or more races	3,265	8.6%
Hispanic or Latino (of any race)	5,201	13.8%

=== 2010 census ===
As of the census of 2010, there were 36,720 people, 16,860 households, and 9,285 families living in the city. The population density was 3,190.3 inhabitants per square mile (1,231.8/km^{2}). There were 17,790 housing units at an average density of 1,545.6 per square mile (596.8/km^{2}). The racial makeup of the city was 88.6% White, 2.3% African American, 0.7% Native American, 3.9% Asian, 2.2% from other races, and 2.3% from two or more races. Hispanic or Latino of any race were 8.4% of the population.

There were 16,860 households, of which 22.4% had children under the age of 18 living with them, 41.9% were married couples living together, 9.2% had a female householder with no husband present, 4.0% had a male householder with no wife present, and 44.9% were non-families. 37.5% of all households were made up of individuals, and 16.5% had someone living alone who was 65 years of age or older. The average household size was 2.13 and the average family size was 2.83.

The median age in the city was 44.4 years. 17.6% of residents were under the age of 18; 8% were between the ages of 18 and 24; 25.2% were from 25 to 44; 28.7% were from 45 to 64; and 20.5% were 65 years of age or older. The gender makeup of the city was 47.6% male and 52.4% female.

=== 2000 census ===
As of the census of 2000, there were 35,476 people, 15,697 households, and 9,167 families living in the city. The population density was 3,072.5 people per square mile (1,185.9/km^{2}). There were 16,203 housing units at an average density of 1,403.3 per square mile (541.6/km^{2}). The racial makeup of the city was 93.72% White, 0.98% African American, 0.44% Native American, 2.26% Asian, 0.02% Pacific Islander, 1.31% from other races, and 1.28% from two or more races. Hispanic or Latino of any race were 3.88% of the population.

There were 15,697 households, out of which 22.6% had children under the age of 18 living with them, 47.3% were married couples living together, 8.0% had a female householder with no husband present, and 41.6% were non-families. 34.6% of all households were made up of individuals, and 14.4% had someone living alone who was 65 years of age or older. The average household size was 2.20 and the average family size was 2.87.

In the city, the population was spread out, with 18.9% under the age of 18, 8.1% from 18 to 24, 28.3% from 25 to 44, 24.3% from 45 to 64, and 20.5% who were 65 years of age or older. The median age was 42 years. For every 100 females, there were 88.4 males. For every 100 females age 18 and over, there were 84.7 males.

The median income for a household in the city was $44,230, and the median income for a family was $56,272. Males had a median income of $40,056 versus $30,212 for females. The per capita income for the city was $23,755. About 3.4% of families and 4.7% of the population were below the poverty line, including 6.9% of those under age 18 and 5.0% of those age 65 or over.

== Transportation ==
Greenfield is served by MCTS Routes 24, 28, 35, 55, 60, 76, and 92.

Since 2022, the Powerline Trail runs through the city.

Interstate 41 and Interstate 43 serve Greenfield.

The Milwaukee Electric Railway & Light interurban served Greenfield at Greenwood Junction.

== Notable people ==
- George G. Brew, politician
- Jon Dekker, professional football player
- Tyler Herro, professional Basketball player
- Dan Jansen, Olympic speed skater
- William Wallace Johnson, minister and politician
- Alan Kulwicki, NASCAR driver and 1992 NASCAR Winston Cup Series Champion
- Craig Kusick, professional baseball player
- Edmund T. Melms, politician
- Dan Nimmer, pianist for Wynton Marsalis
- Thomas O'Neill, politician
- Marjorie Peters, All-American Girls Professional Baseball League player born in Greenfield
- Brandin Podziemski, professional basketball player with the Golden State Warriors
- Robert Schmidt, politician
- Jeana Tomasino, Playmate of the Month in November 1980, actress, "Eliminator Girl" for ZZ Top music videos in the 1980s
- Matt Turk, professional football player and three-time Pro Bowl selection
- Bob Wieland, combat medic in Vietnam, amputee and marathoner; Greenfield High School baseball field was dedicated to him
- Billy Mitchell (1879–1936), distinguished U.S. Army general, who played a major role in the creation of the United States Air Force
