= Lake, Milwaukee County, Wisconsin =

Lake
- Former Town
- Location within the state of Wisconsin
- Coordinates: 42°58′19″N 87°55′12″W
- Country: United States
- State: Wisconsin
- County: Milwaukee
- Time zone: UTC-6 (Central (CST))
  - Summer (DST): UTC-5 (CDT)

Town of Lake, Milwaukee, Wisconsin
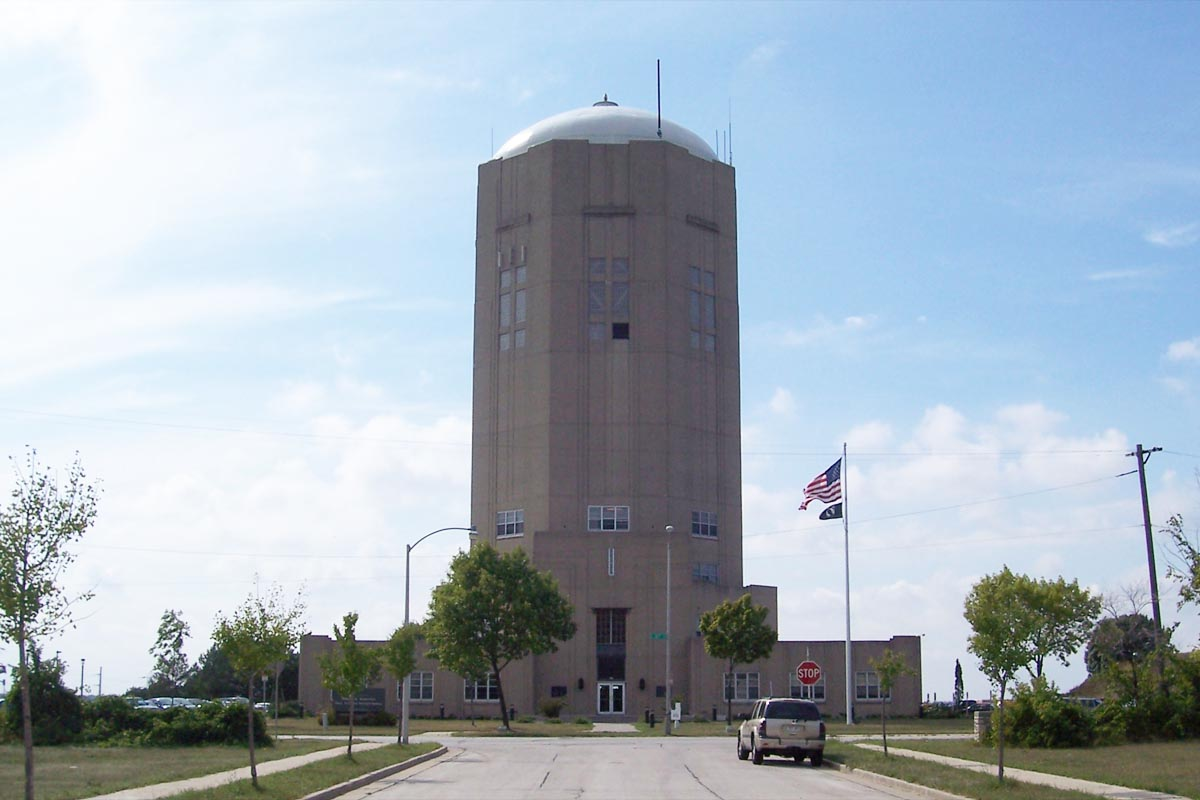
- Town of Lake Water Tower
- Interactive map of Town of Lake, Milwaukee, Wisconsin
- Coordinates: 42°57′59.274″N 87°54′34.2″W

Population
  - Total: 5,396

The Town of Lake was a town in Milwaukee County, Wisconsin, United States, which existed from January 2, 1838 to April 6, 1954. Currently, Lake has become a neighborhood of Milwaukee called Town of Lake.

== Geography ==
After 1840, using current street names, the Town of Lake encompassed the area bordered by Greenfield Ave to the north, Lake Michigan to the east, College Avenue to the south and 27th Street to the west. These areas now make up the cities of St. Francis and Cudahy as well as part of the South Side of the City of Milwaukee, Wisconsin.

== History ==
On January 2, 1838, the territorial legislature divided the County into two townships: the Town of Milwaukee, encompassing everything north of the present Greenfield Avenue, and the Town of Lake, encompassing everything South of the present Greenfield Avenue; "and the polls of election shall be opened at the house of Elisha Higgins, in said town." On March 8, 1839, a new Town of Kinnikennick was created, encompassing the western part of Lake (later the Towns of Greenfield and Franklin); and on August 13, 1840, the south portion of the Town of Lake was split off to form the town of Oak Creek. As of the 1840 census, the population of the Town of Lake (then including Oak Creek) was 418.

According to the 1855 Wisconsin State Census, the Town of Lake's population was 2,127, with 1,308 of them having foreign birth.

The next diminution of the town took place in 1879 when Bay View incorporated as a village. Milwaukee annexed the north portions of the town soon after, and Bay View voted to allow Milwaukee to annex it in 1887.

Patrick Cudahy bought land in the area in 1892 for his meatpacking business. In 1895, this area was incorporated as the Village of Cudahy. After becoming a city, Cudahy later annexed lands south to the border of South Milwaukee.

In July 1951, the area along Lake Michigan north of Cudahy and south of Milwaukee incorporated as the City of St. Francis in order to prevent annexation from Milwaukee and keep profits from the Lakeside Power Plant in the area.

The City of Milwaukee annexed the remaining portion of the town on April 6, 1954, at which point the town ceased to exist. The City of Milwaukee grew by about 15,000 people overnight.

As part of President Franklin D. Roosevelt's Public Works Administration New Deal, an octagonal tower was built in 1938. It was to be the Lake City Hall and doubled as a water tower. This landmark features Art Deco details such as empire lines on the façade, scallops above the entrance and stair railings with chevron designs in them. No longer needed by the neighboring Department of Water Works treatment plant to equalize water pressure, the internal tank was abandoned and the building updated for use as municipal office space in 2001.

In 1993, the Howard Avenue Water Purification Plant became the source of the Milwaukee Cryptosporidium outbreak, the largest documented waterborne disease outbreak in United States history.

== See also ==
- Neighborhoods of Milwaukee
