= 76th Wisconsin Legislature =

Wisconsin legislative term for 1963–1964

| ← | 75th | 77th | → |
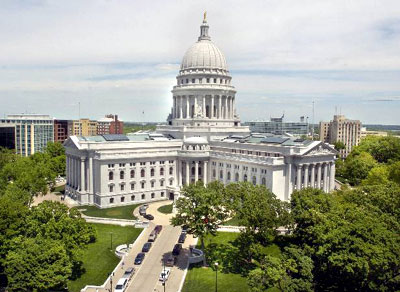
- Wisconsin State Capitol

Overview
- Legislative body: Wisconsin Legislature
- Meeting place: Wisconsin State Capitol
- Term: January 7, 1963 – January 4, 1965
- Election: November 6, 1962

Senate
- Members: 33
- Senate President: Jack B. Olson (R)
- President pro tempore: Frank E. Panzer (R)
- Party control: Republican

Assembly
- Members: 100
- Assembly Speaker: Robert Haase (R)
- Speaker pro tempore: Harold W. Clemens (R)
- Party control: Republican

Sessions
- Regular: January 9, 1963 – January 13, 1965

Special sessions
- Dec. 1963 Spec.: December 10, 1963 – December 13, 1963

The Seventy-Sixth Wisconsin Legislature convened from January 9, 1963, to January 13, 1965, in regular session, and convened in a special session in December 1963.

During this legislative session, the legislature and governor again failed at several attempts to pass a redistricting plan. The Wisconsin Supreme Court enacted its own redistricting plan in May 1964, making it the first time in Wisconsin history that the legislative maps were drawn by a court.

Senators representing odd-numbered districts were newly elected for this session and were serving the first two years of a four-year term. Assembly members were elected to a two-year term. Assembly members and odd-numbered senators were elected in the general election of November 6, 1962. Senators representing even-numbered districts were serving the third and fourth year of a four-year term, having been elected in the general election of November 8, 1960.

The governor of Wisconsin during this entire term was Democrat John W. Reynolds Jr., of Brown County, serving a two-year term, having won election in the 1962 Wisconsin gubernatorial election.

== Major events ==
- January 7, 1963: Inauguration of John W. Reynolds Jr. as the 36th Governor of Wisconsin.
- April 2, 1963: 1963 Wisconsin Spring election:
  - Bruce F. Beilfuss was elected to the Wisconsin Supreme Court to succeed Timothy Brown.
  - Wisconsin voters approved an amendment to the state constitution to allow the legislature to set methodology for equalization of property values for the purpose of calculating municipal and county debt limits.
  - Wisconsin voters also rejected two amendments to the state constitution:
    - to allow the legislature to change the salaries of state judges during their terms.
    - to change the timing of the decennial redistricting from the first session after the census to the second.
- August 28, 1963: Martin Luther King Jr. delivered his "I Have a Dream" speech on the steps of the Lincoln Memorial in Washington, D.C., during the March on Washington for Jobs and Freedom.
- November 22, 1963: U.S. President John F. Kennedy was assassinated in Dallas, Texas. Lyndon B. Johnson immediately succeeded him as the 36th President of the United States.
- January 1, 1964: George R. Currie became the 19th chief justice of the Wisconsin Supreme Court by rule of seniority, at the expiration of the term of chief justice Timothy Brown.
- January 23, 1964: The Twenty-fourth Amendment to the United States Constitution came into force when a sufficient number of states ratified.
- April 7, 1964: 1964 Wisconsin Spring election:
  - Wisconsin voters rejected three amendments to the state constitution:
    - to increase the maximum state appropriation for forestry improvements.
    - to adjust property valuation for municipal and county debt limit calculation for situations where a large amount of material property is suddenly removed.
    - to allow constitutional amendments to contain multiple related issues, rather than having each change as a separate amendment.
- May 14, 1964: The Wisconsin Supreme Court ruled in the case of Reynolds v. Zimmerman, creating new legislative districts for use in the remaining 1960s elections.
- July 2, 1964: U.S. President Lyndon B. Johnson signed the Civil Rights Act of 1964 into law.
- July 23, 1964: Wisconsin Supreme Court justice William H. Dieterich died in office.
- August 10, 1964: U.S. President Lyndon Johnson signed the Gulf of Tonkin Resolution, authorizing the use of American military force in Vietnam.
- August 11, 1964: Wisconsin Governor John W. Reynolds Jr. appointed Nathan Heffernan to the Wisconsin Supreme Court, to succeed the deceased justice William H. Dieterich.
- November 3, 1964: 1964 United States general election:
  - Lyndon B. Johnson (D) elected President of the United States.
  - Warren P. Knowles (R) elected Governor of Wisconsin.
  - William Proxmire (D) elected United States senator from Wisconsin.

== Major legislation ==
- May 23, 1963: An Act ... relating to the apportionment of congressional districts for Wisconsin, 1963 Act 63.
- 1963 Joint Resolution 7: Joint Resolution to amend article IV, section 26 of the constitution, relating to allowing increase or decreases for certain public officers during their term. Second legislative passage of a proposed amendment to the state constitution to allow the legislature to change the salaries of state judges during their terms. This amendment was rejected by voters at the April 1963 election.
- 1963 Joint Resolution 8: Joint Resolution to amend Article XI, section 3 of the constitution, relating to debt limits for units of local government. Second legislative passage of a proposed amendment to the state constitution to allow the legislature to set a process to equalize property values for use in calculating municipal and county debt limits. This amendment was approved by voters at the April 1963 election.
- 1963 Joint Resolution 9: Joint Resolution to amend Article IV, Section 3 of the constitution, relating to the time for apportionment of seats in the state legislature. Second legislative passage of a proposed amendment to the state constitution to change redistricting timing from the first session after the publishing of the census to the second. This amendment was rejected by voters at the April 1963 election.

== Party summary ==
=== Senate summary ===
Senate partisan composition Democratic: 11 seats Republican: 22 seats

| | Party (Shading indicates majority caucus) | | Total | |
| | Dem. | Rep. | Total | Vacant |
|---|---|---|---|---|
| End of previous Legislature | 10 | 20 | 30 | 3 |
| Start of Reg. Session | 11 | 22 | 33 | 0 |
| From May 10, 1964 (Note: Republican Charles J. Schmidt (5th District) resigned to join the Milwaukee common council.) | 10 | 22 | 32 | 1 |
| Final voting share | 31.25% | 68.75% | | |
| Beginning of the next Legislature | 13 | 20 | 33 | 0 |

=== Assembly summary ===
Assembly partisan composition Democratic: 47 seats Republican: 53 seats

| | Party (Shading indicates majority caucus) | | Total | |
| | Dem. | Rep. | Total | Vacant |
|---|---|---|---|---|
| End of previous Legislature | 44 | 54 | 98 | 2 |
| Start of Reg. Session (Note: Republican speaker David Blanchard (Rock County) died before the start of the session.) | 47 | 52 | 99 | 1 |
| From Apr. 9, 1963 (Note: Republican Carolyn Blanchard (Rock County) sworn in to replace David Blanchard.) | 47 | 53 | 100 | 0 |
| From Aug. 8, 1963 (Note: Republican Hugh A. Harper (Grant County) died.) | 47 | 52 | 99 | 1 |
| From Oct. 15, 1963 (Note: Republican Christian M. Stauffer (Green County) died.) | 47 | 51 | 98 | 2 |
| From Apr. 13, 1964 (Note: Republicans James N. Azim Jr. (Grant County) and G. Fred Galli (Green County) sworn in to replace Hugh A. Harper and Christian M. Stauffer.) | 47 | 53 | 100 | 0 |
| Final voting share | 47% | 53% | | |
| Beginning of the next Legislature | 51 | 49 | 100 | 0 |

== Sessions ==
- Regular session: January 9, 1963 – January 13, 1965
- December 1963 special session: December 10, 1963 – December 13, 1963

== Leaders ==
=== Senate leadership ===
- President of the Senate: Jack B. Olson (R)
- President pro tempore: Frank E. Panzer (R–Oakfield)
- Majority leader: Robert P. Knowles (R–New Richmond)
- Minority leader: Richard J. Zaborski (D–Milwaukee)

=== Assembly leadership ===
- Speaker of the Assembly: Robert Haase (R–Marinette)
- Speaker pro tempore: Harold W. Clemens (R–Oconomowoc)
- Majority leader: Paul Alfonsi (R–Minocqua)
- Minority leader: Robert T. Huber (D–West Allis)

== Members ==
=== Members of the Senate ===
Members of the Senate for the Seventy-Sixth Wisconsin Legislature:

Senate partisan representation Democratic: 11 seats Republican: 22 seats

| Dist. | Counties | Senator | Residence | Party |
|---|---|---|---|---|
| 01 | Door, Kewaunee, & Manitowoc | Alex Meunier | Sturgeon Bay | Rep. |
| 02 | Brown | Leo P. O'Brien | Green Bay | Rep. |
| 03 | Milwaukee (South City) | Casimir Kendziorski | Milwaukee | Dem. |
| 04 | Milwaukee (North County) | Jerris Leonard | Milwaukee | Rep. |
| 05 | Milwaukee (Northwest City) | Charles J. Schmidt (res. May 10, 1964) | Milwaukee | Dem. |
| 06 | Milwaukee (Northeast City) | Martin J. Schreiber | Milwaukee | Dem. |
| 07 | Milwaukee (South County & Southeast City) | Leland McParland | Cudahy | Dem. |
| 08 | Milwaukee (Western County) | Allen Busby | West Milwaukee | Rep. |
| 09 | Milwaukee (City Downtown) | Norman Sussman | Milwaukee | Dem. |
| 10 | Buffalo, Dunn, Pepin, Pierce, & St. Croix | Robert P. Knowles | New Richmond | Rep. |
| 11 | Milwaukee (Western City) | Richard J. Zaborski | Milwaukee | Dem. |
| 12 | Iron, Lincoln, Oneida, Price, Taylor, & Vilas | Clifford Krueger | Merrill | Rep. |
| 13 | Dodge & Washington | Frank E. Panzer | Oakfield | Rep. |
| 14 | Outagamie & Waupaca | Gerald Lorge | Bear Creek | Rep. |
| 15 | Rock | Peter P. Carr | Janesville | Rep. |
| 16 | Dane (Excluding Madison) | Carl W. Thompson | Stoughton | Dem. |
| 17 | Grant, Green, Iowa, & Lafayette | Gordon Roseleip | Darlington | Rep. |
| 18 | Fond du Lac, Green Lake & Waushara | Walter G. Hollander | Rosendale | Rep. |
| 19 | Calumet & Winnebago | William Draheim | Neenah | Rep. |
| 20 | Ozaukee & Sheboygan | Ernest Keppler | Sheboygan Falls | Rep. |
| 21 | Racine | Lynn E. Stalbaum | Racine | Dem. |
| 22 | Kenosha & Walworth | Earl D. Morton | Kenosha | Rep. |
| 23 | Barron, Burnett, Polk, Rusk, Sawyer, & Washburn | Holger Rasmusen | Spooner | Rep. |
| 24 | Clark, Portage, & Wood | John M. Potter | Port Edwards | Rep. |
| 25 | Ashland, Bayfield, & Douglas | Frank Christopherson Jr. | Superior | Dem. |
| 26 | Dane (Madison) | Fred Risser | Madison | Dem. |
| 27 | Columbia, Crawford, Richland, & Sauk | Jess Miller | Richland Center | Rep. |
| 28 | Chippewa & Eau Claire | Davis A. Donnelly | Eau Claire | Dem. |
| 29 | Marathon, Menominee, & Shawano | Charles F. Smith Jr. | Wausau | Rep. |
| 30 | Florence, Forest, Langlade, Marinette, & Oconto | Reuben La Fave | Oconto | Rep. |
| 31 | Adams, Juneau, Monroe, Marquette, & Vernon | J. Earl Leverich | Sparta | Rep. |
| 32 | Jackson, La Crosse, & Trempealeau | Raymond Bice Sr. | La Crosse | Rep. |
| 33 | Jefferson & Waukesha | Chester Dempsey | Hartland | Rep. |

=== Members of the Assembly ===
Members of the Assembly for the Seventy-Sixth Wisconsin Legislature:

Assembly partisan composition Democratic: 47 seats Republican: 53 seats

Milwaukee County districts

| Senate Dist. | County | Dist. | Representative | Party | Residence |
|---|---|---|---|---|---|
| 31 | Adams, Juneau, & Marquette | | Louis C. Romell | Rep. | Adams |
| 25 | Ashland & Bayfield | | Robert F. Barabe | Dem. | Mellen |
| 23 | Barron | | Thomas St. Angelo | Rep. | Cumberland |
| 02 | Brown | 1 | Jerome Quinn | Rep. | Green Bay |
| 02 | Brown | 2 | Alexander R. Grant | Rep. | Green Bay |
| 02 | Brown | 3 | Cletus J. Vanderperren | Dem. | Green Bay |
| 10 | Buffalo, Pepin, & Pierce | | Robert I. Johnson | Rep. | Mondovi |
| 23 | Burnett & Polk | | Harvey L. Dueholm | Dem. | Luck |
| 19 | Calumet | | Wilmer H. Struebing | Rep. | Brillion |
| 28 | Chippewa | | Edgar E. Lien | Rep. | Bloomer |
| 24 | Clark | | Frank Nikolay | Dem. | Abbotsford |
| 27 | Columbia | | Everett Bidwell | Rep. | Portage |
| 27 | Crawford & Richland | | Milford C. Kintz | Rep. | Richland Center |
| 26 | Dane | 1 | Norman C. Anderson | Dem. | Madison |
| 26 | Dane | 2 | Edward Nager | Dem. | Madison |
| 26 | Dane | 3 | Robert Uehling | Rep. | Madison |
| 16 | Dane | 4 | Jerome L. Blaska | Dem. | Sun Prairie |
| 16 | Dane | 5 | David D. O'Malley | Dem. | Waunakee |
| 13 | Dodge | 1 | Esther S. Doughty | Rep. | Horicon |
| 13 | Dodge | 2 | Elmer C. Nitschke | Rep. | Beaver Dam |
| 01 | Door & Kewaunee | | Lawrence Johnson | Rep. | Algoma |
| 25 | Douglas | 1 | Reino A. Perala | Dem. | Superior |
| 25 | Douglas | 2 | Charles J. Bouchard | Dem. | Brule |
| 10 | Dunn | | William E. Owen | Rep. | Menomonie |
| 28 | Eau Claire | 1 | Thomas H. Barland | Rep. | Eau Claire |
| 28 | Eau Claire | 2 | Louis V. Mato | Dem. | Fairchild |
| 30 | Florence, Forest, & Langlade | | Paul Dailey Jr. | Rep. | Elcho |
| 18 | Fond du Lac | 1 | Earl F. McEssy | Rep. | Fond du Lac |
| 18 | Fond du Lac | 2 | Fred W. Schlueter | Rep. | Ripon |
| 17 | Grant | | Hugh A. Harper (died Aug. 8, 1963) | Rep. | Lancaster |
| 17 | Grant | | James N. Azim Jr. (from Apr. 13, 1964) | Rep. | Muscoda |
| 17 | Green | | Christian M. Stauffer (died Oct. 15, 1963) | Rep. | Monticello |
| 17 | Green | | G. Fred Galli (from Apr. 13, 1964) | Rep. | Monroe |
| 18 | Green Lake & Waushara | | Franklin M. Jahnke | Rep. | Markesan |
| 17 | Iowa & Lafayette | | Walter B. Calvert | Rep. | Benton |
| 12 | Iron, Oneida, & Vilas | | Paul Alfonsi | Rep. | Minocqua |
| 32 | Jackson & Trempealeau | | Merlin J. Peterson | Rep. | Black River Falls |
| 33 | Jefferson | | Byron F. Wackett | Rep. | Watertown |
| 22 | Kenosha | 1 | George Molinaro | Dem. | Kenosha |
| 22 | Kenosha | 2 | Russell Olson | Rep. | Randall |
| 32 | La Crosse | 1 | D. Russell Wartinbee | Rep. | La Crosse |
| 32 | La Crosse | 2 | Norbert Nuttelman | Rep. | West Salem |
| 12 | Lincoln | | Fred C. Reger | Rep. | Merrill |
| 01 | Manitowoc | 1 | Eugene S. Kaufman | Dem. | Manitowoc |
| 01 | Manitowoc | 2 | Everett E. Bolle | Dem. | Two Rivers |
| 29 | Marathon | 1 | Ben A. Riehle | Dem. | Athens |
| 29 | Marathon | 2 | Dave Obey | Dem. | Wausau |
| 30 | Marinette | | Robert Haase | Rep. | Marinette |
| 29 | Menominee & Shawano | | Theodore Abrahamson | Rep. | Tigerton |
| 04 | Milwaukee | 1 | Stan Pelecky | Dem. | Milwaukee |
| 09 | Milwaukee | 2 | Frank G. Dionesopulos | Dem. | Milwaukee |
| 09 | Milwaukee | 3 | Angelo F. Greco | Dem. | Milwaukee |
| 11 | Milwaukee | 4 | Frank E. Schaeffer Jr. | Dem. | Milwaukee |
| 05 | Milwaukee | 5 | Mark W. Ryan | Dem. | Milwaukee |
| 09 | Milwaukee | 6 | Isaac N. Coggs | Dem. | Milwaukee |
| 06 | Milwaukee | 7 | Allen J. Flannigan | Dem. | Milwaukee |
| 11 | Milwaukee | 8 | Adrian Manders | Dem. | Milwaukee |
| 05 | Milwaukee | 9 | Joseph E. Jones | Dem. | Milwaukee |
| 06 | Milwaukee | 10 | Patrick H. Kelly | Dem. | Milwaukee |
| 03 | Milwaukee | 11 | Raymond J. Tobiasz | Dem. | Milwaukee |
| 03 | Milwaukee | 12 | Albert R. Tadych | Dem. | Milwaukee |
| 06 | Milwaukee | 13 | Raymond Lee Lathan | Dem. | Milwaukee |
| 03 | Milwaukee | 14 | Richard C. Nowakowski | Dem. | Milwaukee |
| 05 | Milwaukee | 15 | Wilfred Schuele | Dem. | Milwaukee |
| 11 | Milwaukee | 16 | Wayne F. Whittow | Dem. | Milwaukee |
| 07 | Milwaukee | 17 | John E. McCormick | Dem. | Milwaukee |
| 04 | Milwaukee | 18 | Michael J. Barron | Dem. | Milwaukee |
| 04 | Milwaukee | 19 | Nile Soik | Rep. | Whitefish Bay |
| 08 | Milwaukee | 20 | Glen Pommerening | Rep. | Wauwatosa |
| 08 | Milwaukee | 21 | Richard J. Lynch | Dem. | West Allis |
| 08 | Milwaukee | 22 | Robert T. Huber | Dem. | West Allis |
| 07 | Milwaukee | 23 | Robert Schmidt | Dem. | West Allis |
| 07 | Milwaukee | 24 | Lawrence P. Kelly | Dem. | Cudahy |
| 31 | Monroe | | Kyle Kenyon | Rep. | Tomah |
| 30 | Oconto | | Lloyd R. Baumgart | Rep. | Lena |
| 14 | Outagamie | 1 | Harold V. Froehlich | Rep. | Appleton |
| 14 | Outagamie | 2 | William J. Rogers | Dem. | Kaukauna |
| 20 | Ozaukee | | J. Curtis McKay | Rep. | Thiensville |
| 24 | Portage | | Norman Myhra | Dem. | Stevens Point |
| 12 | Price & Taylor | | Joseph Sweda | Dem. | Lublin |
| 21 | Racine | 1 | Earl W. Warren | Dem. | Racine |
| 21 | Racine | 2 | Roy E. Naleid | Dem. | Racine |
| 21 | Racine | 3 | Merrill E. Stalbaum | Rep. | Waterford |
| 15 | Rock | 1 | William Merriam | Rep. | Janesville |
| 15 | Rock | 2 | --Vacant until Apr. 9, 1963-- | | |
| 15 | Rock | 2 | Carolyn Blanchard (from Apr. 9, 1963) | Rep. | Edgerton |
| 15 | Rock | 3 | George B. Belting | Rep. | Beloit |
| 23 | Rusk, Sawyer, & Washburn | | Willis J. Hutnik | Rep. | Tony |
| 27 | Sauk | | Walter Terry | Rep. | Baraboo |
| 20 | Sheboygan | 1 | Kenneth Kunde | Dem. | Sheboygan |
| 20 | Sheboygan | 2 | Harry L. Gessert | Rep. | Elkhart Lake |
| 10 | St. Croix | | William W. Ward | Dem. | New Richmond |
| 16 | Vernon | | Bernard Lewison | Rep. | Viroqua |
| 22 | Walworth | | George M. Borg | Rep. | Delavan |
| 13 | Washington | | Elmer J. Schowalter | Rep. | Jackson |
| 33 | Waukesha | 1 | Vincent R. Mathews | Dem. | Waukesha |
| 33 | Waukesha | 2 | Harold W. Clemens | Rep. | Oconomowoc |
| 14 | Waupaca | | Richard E. Peterson | Rep. | Clintonville |
| 19 | Winnebago | 1 | William A. Steiger | Rep. | Oshkosh |
| 19 | Winnebago | 2 | Floyd E. Shurbert | Rep. | Oshkosh |
| 19 | Winnebago | 3 | David O. Martin | Rep. | Menasha |
| 24 | Wood | 1 | Raymond F. Heinzen | Rep. | Marshfield |
| 24 | Wood | 2 | Harvey F. Gee | Rep. | Wisconsin Rapids |

== Committees ==
=== Senate committees ===
- Senate Standing Committee on Agriculture – J. E. Leverich, chair
- Senate Standing Committee on Conservation – C. Krueger, chair
- Senate Standing Committee on Education – P. P. Carr, chair
- Senate Standing Committee on Governmental and Veterans Affairs – L. P. O'Brien, chair
- Senate Standing Committee on Highways – J. Miller, chair
- Senate Standing Committee on Interstate Cooperation – F. E. Panzer, chair
- Senate Standing Committee on the Judiciary – A. Busby, chair
- Senate Standing Committee on Labor, Taxation, Insurance, and Banking – G. Lorge, chair
- Senate Standing Committee on Public Welfare – C. Dempsey, chair
- Senate Standing Committee on Senate Organization – F. E. Panzer, chair
- Senate Special Committee on Committees – R. Bice, chair
- Senate Special Committee on Contingent Expenditures – R. La Fave, chair
- Senate Special Committee on Legislative Procedure – F. E. Panzer, chair

=== Assembly committees ===
- Assembly Standing Committee on Agriculture – W. Merriam, chair
- Assembly Standing Committee on Assembly Organization – R. Haase, chair
- Assembly Standing Committee on Commerce and Manufactures – J. Quinn, chair
- Assembly Standing Committee on Conservation – P. Alfonsi, chair
- Assembly Standing Committee on Contingent Expenditures – J. C. McKay, chair
- Assembly Standing Committee on Education – W. B. Calvert, chair
- Assembly Standing Committee on Elections – W. A. Steiger, chair
- Assembly Standing Committee on Engrossed Bills – F. W. Schlueter, chair
- Assembly Standing Committee on Enrolled Bills – W. E. Owen, chair
- Assembly Standing Committee on Excise and Fees – F. E. Shurbert, chair
- Assembly Standing Committee on Highways – E. C. Nitschke, chair
- Assembly Standing Committee on Insurance and Banking – K. Kenyon, chair
- Assembly Standing Committee on the Judiciary – R. E. Peterson, chair
- Assembly Standing Committee on Labor – W. J. Hutnik, chair
- Assembly Standing Committee on Municipalities – E. F. McEssy, chair
- Assembly Standing Committee on Printing – M. C. Kintz, chair
- Assembly Standing Committee on Public Welfare – W. Terry, chair
- Assembly Standing Committee on Revision – L. R. Baumgart, chair
- Assembly Standing Committee on Rules – P. Alfonsi, chair
- Assembly Standing Committee on State Affairs – F. M. Jahnke, chair
- Assembly Standing Committee on Taxation – E. Bidwell, chair
- Assembly Standing Committee on Third Reading – C. M. Stauffer, chair
- Assembly Standing Committee on Transportation – B. Lewison, chair
- Assembly Standing Committee on Veterans and Military Affairs – H. W. Clemens, chair

=== Joint committees ===
- Joint Standing Committee on Finance – W. G. Hollander (Sen.) & G. Pommerening (Asm.), co-chairs
- Joint Standing Committee on Legislative Organization – R. Haase, chair
- Joint Standing Committee on Revisions, Repeals, and Uniform Laws – E. Keppler (Sen.) & R. Uehling (Asm.), co-chairs
- Joint Legislative Council – R. Knowles, chair

== Employees ==
=== Senate employees ===
- Chief Clerk: Lawrence R. Larsen
- Sergeant-at-Arms: Harold E. Damon

=== Assembly employees ===
- Chief Clerk: Kenneth E. Priebe
- Sergeant-at-Arms: Norris J. Kellman
