= 75th Wisconsin Legislature =

Wisconsin legislative term for 1961–1962

←	74th	76th	→
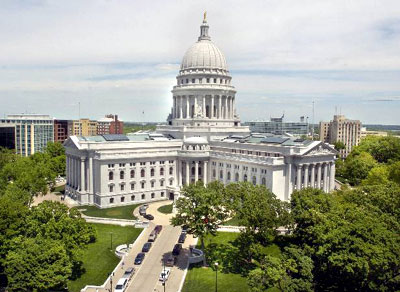
- Wisconsin State Capitol

Overview
- Legislative body: Wisconsin Legislature
- Meeting place: Wisconsin State Capitol
- Term: January 2, 1961 – January 7, 1963
- Election: November 8, 1960

Senate
- Members: 33
- Senate President: Warren P. Knowles (R)
- President pro tempore: Frank E. Panzer (R)
- Party control: Republican

Assembly
- Members: 100
- Assembly Speaker: David Blanchard (R) (until Dec. 23, 1962)
- Speaker pro tempore: Willis J. Hutnik (R)
- Party control: Republican

Sessions
- Regular: January 11, 1961 – January 9, 1963

The Seventy-Fifth Wisconsin Legislature convened from January 11, 1961, to January 9, 1963, in regular session. This was the first time that the legislative session was kept open for the entire term of the legislature.

This session represents the second time the Legislature failed to pass a redistricting act on schedule. Ultimately, the legislature and governor would not be able to agree on a redistricting act in the 1960s, and for the first time in state history, the maps would be drawn by the Wisconsin Supreme Court (in 1964).

Senators representing even-numbered districts were newly elected for this session and were serving the first two years of a four-year term. Assembly members were elected to a two-year term. Assembly members and even-numbered senators were elected in the general election of November 8, 1960. Senators representing odd-numbered districts were serving the third and fourth year of a four-year term, having been elected in the general election of November 4, 1958.

The governor of Wisconsin during this entire term was Democrat Gaylord Nelson, of Dane County, serving his second two-year term, having won re-election in the 1960 Wisconsin gubernatorial election.

== Major events ==
- January 2, 1961: Second inauguration of Gaylord Nelson as Governor of Wisconsin.
- January 20, 1961: Inauguration of John F. Kennedy as the 35th President of the United States.
- January 25, 1961: John F. Kennedy delivered the first live televised press conference by a U.S. president.
- March 1, 1961: U.S. President John F. Kennedy established the Peace Corps by executive order.
- March 29, 1961: The Twenty-third Amendment to the United States Constitution came into force after it was ratified by the requisite number of states.
- April 4, 1961: 1961 Wisconsin spring election:
  - Myron L. Gordon was elected to the Wisconsin Supreme Court to succeed John E. Martin.
  - Wisconsin voters approved four amendments to the state constitution:
    - Directing the legislature to set a plan for continuity of government.
    - Establishing taxation rules for commercial stock and property.
    - Allowing the legislature to set rules for municipal eminent domain seizures and removing a jury from the process.
    - Allowing an additional 10% municipal indebtedness for school purposes in districts that offer all levels of primary schooling.
  - Wisconsin voters also rejected two amendments to the state constitution:
    - Allowing sheriffs to serve successive terms. This was the fifth failed attempt to remove or alter these term limits for sheriffs.
    - Allowing the legislature to vote a pay increase for the same session of the legislature.
- April 12, 1961: Soviet cosmonaut Yuri Gagarin became the first human in space, piloting the Vostok 1 mission.
- April 19, 1961: The Bay of Pigs Invasion of Cuba ended in failure.
- May 5, 1961: Astronaut Alan Shepard became the first American in space, piloting the Mercury-Redstone 3.
- May 25, 1961: At a joint session of congress, U.S. President John F. Kennedy announced his goal to put a man on the Moon by the end of the decade.
- August 13, 1961: Construction of the Berlin Wall began.
- November 18, 1962: U.S. President John F. Kennedy ordered 18,000 U.S. military advisors to South Vietnam.
- December 31, 1961: The Green Bay Packers won the 1961 NFL Championship Game.
- January 1, 1962: Grover L. Broadfoot became the 17th chief justice of the Wisconsin Supreme Court by rule of seniority, at the expiration of the term of justice John E. Martin.
- May 18, 1962: Wisconsin Supreme Court chief justice Grover L. Broadfoot died in office. Justice Timothy Brown became the 18th chief justice of the Wisconsin Supreme Court due to the rule of seniority.
- October 28, 1962: Soviet Union leader Nikita Khrushchev announced that he ordered the removal of Soviet missile bases from Cuba, ending the Cuban Missile Crisis.
- November 6, 1962: 1962 United States general election:
  - John W. Reynolds Jr. (D) elected Governor of Wisconsin.
  - Gaylord Nelson (D) elected United States senator from Wisconsin.
  - Wisconsin voters approved three amendments to the state constitution:
    - Removing the exemption for "indians not taxed" from the legislative apportionment rules.
    - Allowing the legislature to create the office of county executive for counties with more than 500,000 residents (only Milwaukee County).
    - Establishing the rules of the veto power for the county executive.
- December 23, 1962: Wisconsin Assembly speaker David Blanchard died in office.
- December 30, 1962: The Green Bay Packers won the 1962 NFL Championship Game.

== Major legislation ==
- 1961 Joint Resolution 8: Second legislative passage of a proposed amendment to the state constitution to allow an additional 10% municipal indebtedness for school purposes in districts that offer all levels of primary schooling. This amendment was ratified by voters at the April 1961 election.
- 1961 Joint Resolution 9: Second legislative passage of a proposed amendment to the state constitution to allow sheriffs to serve successive terms. This amendment was rejected by voters at the April 1961 election.
- 1961 Joint Resolution 10: Second legislative passage of a proposed amendment to the state constitution to create section 34 of article IV, directing the legislature to create a plan for continuity of government in the event of an emergency. This amendment was ratified by voters at the April 1961 election.
- 1961 Joint Resolution 11: Second legislative passage of a proposed amendment to the state constitution to allow legislators to change their own salary within the same session. This amendment was rejected by voters at the April 1961 election.
- 1961 Joint Resolution 12: Second legislative passage of a proposed amendment to the state constitution to allow the legislature to set new rules for municipal eminent domain acquisitions, and removing the constitutional requirement for a jury verdict in such cases. This amendment was ratified by voters at the April 1961 election.
- 1961 Joint Resolution 13: Second legislative passage of a proposed amendment to the state constitution to add rules for taxation of commercial goods and property. This amendment was ratified by voters at the April 1961 election.
- 1961 Joint Resolution 32: Second legislative passage of a proposed amendment to the state constitution to remove exemption of "indians not taxed" from the legislative apportionment rules. This amendment was ratified by voters at the November 1962 election.
- 1961 Joint Resolution 64: Second legislative passage of two proposed amendments to the state constitution to allow the legislature to establish the office of county executive for any county with a population over five hundred thousand (at the time, only Milwaukee County fit this criterion). The amendment also proposed a veto power for the county executive over the acts of the county board, including a powerful partial veto for appropriations. Both amendments were ratified by voters at the November 1962 election.

== Party summary ==
=== Senate summary ===
Senate partisan composition Democratic: 12 seats Republican: 20 seats Vacant: 1 seat

	Party (Shading indicates majority caucus)		Total	
	Dem.	Rep.	Total	Vacant
End of previous Legislature	13	20	33	0
Start of Reg. Session	13	20	33	0
From Apr. 29, 1961 (Note: Democrat James B. Brennan (5th District) resigned to accept appointment as U.S. attorney.)	12	20	32	1
From Dec. 22, 1961 (Note: Democrat Carl Lauri (25th District) resigned to accept appointment to Wisconsin Industrial Commission.)	11	20	31	2
From Feb. 1, 1962 (Note: Democrat William R. Moser (6th District) resigned to accept appointment as a county judge.)	10	20	30	3
Final voting share	33.33%	66.67%		
Beginning of the next Legislature	11	22	33	0

=== Assembly summary ===
Assembly partisan composition Democratic: 45 seats Republican: 55 seats

	Party (Shading indicates majority caucus)		Total	
	Dem.	Rep.	Total	Vacant
End of previous Legislature	54	45	99	1
Start of Reg. Session	45	55	100	0
From Sep. 1, 1961 (Note: Democrat Henry A. Hillemann (Sheboygan County) resigned to accept appointment as executive secretary of the Wisconsin Judicial Council.)	44	55	99	1
From Dec. 23, 1962 (Note: Republican speaker David Blanchard (Rock County) died.)	44	54	98	2
Final voting share	44.9%	55.1%		
Beginning of the next Legislature	47	52	99	1

== Sessions ==
- Regular session: January 11, 1961 – January 9, 1963

== Leaders ==
=== Senate leadership ===
- President of the Senate: Warren P. Knowles (R)
- President pro tempore: Frank E. Panzer (R–Oakfield)
- Majority leader: Robert S. Travis (R–Platteville)
- Minority leader: William R. Moser (D–Milwaukee) (res. Jan. 30, 1962)

=== Assembly leadership ===
- Speaker of the Assembly: David Blanchard (R–Edgerton) (died Dec. 23, 1962)
- Speaker pro tempore: Willis J. Hutnik (R–Tony)
- Majority leader: Robert Haase (R–Marinette)
- Minority leader: Robert T. Huber (D–West Allis)

== Members ==
=== Members of the Senate ===
Members of the Senate for the Seventy-Fifth Wisconsin Legislature:

Senate partisan representation Democratic: 12 seats Republican: 20 seats Vacant: 1 seat

Dist.	Counties	Senator	Residence	Party
01	Door, Kewaunee, & Manitowoc	Alfred A. Laun Jr.	Kiel	Rep.
02	Brown	Leo P. O'Brien	Green Bay	Rep.
03	Milwaukee (South City)	Casimir Kendziorski	Milwaukee	Dem.
04	Milwaukee (North County)	Jerris Leonard	Milwaukee	Rep.
05	Milwaukee (Northwest City)	James B. Brennan (res. Apr. 29, 1961)	Milwaukee	Dem.
05	Milwaukee (Northwest City)	--Vacant from Apr. 29, 1961--		
06	Milwaukee (Northeast City)	William R. Moser (res. Feb. 1, 1962)	Milwaukee	Dem.
07	Milwaukee (South County & Southeast City)	Leland McParland	Cudahy	Dem.
08	Milwaukee (Western County)	Allen Busby	West Milwaukee	Rep.
09	Milwaukee (City Downtown)	Norman Sussman	Milwaukee	Dem.
10	Buffalo, Dunn, Pepin, Pierce, & St. Croix	Robert P. Knowles	New Richmond	Rep.
11	Milwaukee (Western City)	Richard J. Zaborski	Milwaukee	Dem.
12	Iron, Lincoln, Oneida, Price, Taylor, & Vilas	Clifford Krueger	Merrill	Rep.
13	Dodge & Washington	Frank E. Panzer	Oakfield	Rep.
14	Outagamie & Waupaca	Gerald Lorge	Bear Creek	Rep.
15	Rock	Peter P. Carr	Janesville	Rep.
16	Dane (Excluding Madison)	Carl W. Thompson	Stoughton	Dem.
17	Grant, Green, Iowa, & Lafayette	Robert S. Travis	Platteville	Rep.
18	Fond du Lac, Green Lake & Waushara	Walter G. Hollander	Rosendale	Rep.
19	Calumet & Winnebago	William Draheim	Neenah	Rep.
20	Ozaukee & Sheboygan	Ernest Keppler	Sheboygan Falls	Rep.
21	Racine	Lynn E. Stalbaum	Racine	Dem.
22	Kenosha & Walworth	Earl D. Morton	Kenosha	Rep.
23	Barron, Burnett, Polk, Rusk, Sawyer, & Washburn	Howard W. Cameron	Rice Lake	Dem.
24	Clark, Portage, & Wood	John M. Potter	Port Edwards	Rep.
25	Ashland, Bayfield, & Douglas	Carl Lauri (res. Dec. 22, 1961)	Superior	Dem.
26	Dane (Madison)	Horace W. Wilkie	Madison	Dem.
27	Columbia, Crawford, Richland, & Sauk	Jess Miller	Richland Center	Rep.
28	Chippewa & Eau Claire	Davis A. Donnelly	Eau Claire	Dem.
29	Marathon, Menominee, & Shawano	Robert W. Dean	Rothschild	Dem.
30	Florence, Forest, Langlade, Marinette, & Oconto	Reuben La Fave	Oconto	Rep.
31	Adams, Juneau, Monroe, Marquette, & Vernon	J. Earl Leverich	Sparta	Rep.
32	Jackson, La Crosse, & Trempealeau	Raymond Bice Sr.	La Crosse	Rep.
33	Jefferson & Waukesha	Chester Dempsey	Hartland	Rep.

=== Members of the Assembly ===
Members of the Assembly for the Seventy-Fifth Wisconsin Legislature:

Assembly partisan composition Democratic: 45 seats Republican: 55 seats

Milwaukee County districts

Senate Dist.	County	Dist.	Representative	Party	Residence
31	Adams, Juneau, & Marquette		Louis C. Romell	Rep.	Adams
25	Ashland & Bayfield		Robert F. Barabe	Dem.	Mellen
23	Barron		Thomas St. Angelo	Rep.	Cumberland
02	Brown	1	Jerome Quinn	Rep.	Green Bay
02	Brown	2	Alexander R. Grant	Rep.	Green Bay
02	Brown	3	Cletus J. Vanderperren	Dem.	Green Bay
10	Buffalo, Pepin, & Pierce		Robert I. Johnson	Rep.	Mondovi
23	Burnett & Polk		Harvey L. Dueholm	Dem.	Luck
19	Calumet		Gilbert Hipke	Rep.	New Holstein
28	Chippewa		Clifford E. Dorr	Dem.	Chippewa Falls
24	Clark		Frank Nikolay	Dem.	Abbotsford
27	Columbia		Everett Bidwell	Rep.	Portage
27	Crawford & Richland		Milford C. Kintz	Rep.	Richland Center
26	Dane	1	Norman C. Anderson	Dem.	Madison
26	Dane	2	Fred A. Risser	Dem.	Madison
26	Dane	3	Robert Uehling	Rep.	Madison
16	Dane	4	Jerome L. Blaska	Dem.	Sun Prairie
16	Dane	5	David D. O'Malley	Dem.	Waunakee
13	Dodge	1	Elmer L. Genzmer	Rep.	Mayville
13	Dodge	2	Elmer C. Nitschke	Rep.	Beaver Dam
01	Door & Kewaunee		Lawrence Johnson	Rep.	Algoma
25	Douglas	1	Reino A. Perala	Dem.	Superior
25	Douglas	2	Frank Christopherson Jr.	Dem.	Superior
10	Dunn		William E. Owen	Rep.	Menomonie
28	Eau Claire	1	Thomas H. Barland	Rep.	Eau Claire
28	Eau Claire	2	John T. Pritchard	Dem.	Eau Claire
30	Florence, Forest, & Langlade		John R. Gray	Dem.	Antigo
18	Fond du Lac	1	Earl F. McEssy	Rep.	Fond du Lac
18	Fond du Lac	2	Fred W. Schlueter	Rep.	Ripon
17	Grant		Hugh A. Harper	Rep.	Lancaster
17	Green		Christian M. Stauffer	Rep.	Monticello
18	Green Lake & Waushara		Franklin M. Jahnke	Rep.	Markesan
17	Iowa & Lafayette		Walter B. Calvert	Rep.	Benton
12	Iron, Oneida, & Vilas		Paul Alfonsi	Rep.	Minocqua
32	Jackson & Trempealeau		Merlin J. Peterson	Rep.	Black River Falls
33	Jefferson		Byron F. Wackett	Rep.	Watertown
22	Kenosha	1	George Molinaro	Dem.	Kenosha
22	Kenosha	2	Russell Olson	Rep.	Randall
32	La Crosse	1	D. Russell Wartinbee	Rep.	La Crosse
32	La Crosse	2	Norbert Nuttelman	Rep.	West Salem
12	Lincoln		Emil A. Hinz	Rep.	Merrill
01	Manitowoc	1	Hugo E. Vogel	Dem.	Manitowoc
01	Manitowoc	2	Everett E. Bolle	Dem.	Two Rivers
29	Marathon	1	Ben A. Riehle	Dem.	Athens
29	Marathon	2	Paul A. Luedtke	Rep.	Wausau
30	Marinette		Robert Haase	Rep.	Marinette
04	Milwaukee	1	Louis L. Merz	Dem.	Milwaukee
09	Milwaukee	2	Frank G. Dionesopulos	Dem.	Milwaukee
09	Milwaukee	3	Angelo F. Greco	Dem.	Milwaukee
11	Milwaukee	4	Frank E. Schaeffer Jr.	Dem.	Milwaukee
05	Milwaukee	5	Mark W. Ryan	Dem.	Milwaukee
09	Milwaukee	6	Isaac N. Coggs	Dem.	Milwaukee
06	Milwaukee	7	Allen J. Flannigan	Dem.	Milwaukee
11	Milwaukee	8	Adrian Manders	Dem.	Milwaukee
05	Milwaukee	9	Charles J. Schmidt	Dem.	Milwaukee
06	Milwaukee	10	Fred Kessler	Dem.	Milwaukee
03	Milwaukee	11	Raymond J. Tobiasz	Dem.	Milwaukee
03	Milwaukee	12	Albert R. Tadych	Dem.	Milwaukee
06	Milwaukee	13	Ervin Mueller	Dem.	Milwaukee
03	Milwaukee	14	Richard C. Nowakowski	Dem.	Milwaukee
05	Milwaukee	15	Wilfred Schuele	Dem.	Milwaukee
11	Milwaukee	16	Wayne F. Whittow	Dem.	Milwaukee
07	Milwaukee	17	John E. McCormick	Dem.	Milwaukee
04	Milwaukee	18	Michael J. Barron	Dem.	Milwaukee
04	Milwaukee	19	Nile Soik	Rep.	Whitefish Bay
08	Milwaukee	20	Glen Pommerening	Rep.	Wauwatosa
08	Milwaukee	21	Robert A. Collins	Dem.	Wauwatosa
08	Milwaukee	22	Robert T. Huber	Dem.	West Allis
07	Milwaukee	23	Robert Schmidt	Dem.	West Allis
07	Milwaukee	24	Sherman R. Sobocinski	Dem.	South Milwaukee
31	Monroe		Kyle Kenyon	Rep.	Tomah
30	Oconto		Lloyd R. Baumgart	Rep.	Lena
14	Outagamie	1	Kenneth E. Priebe	Rep.	Appleton
14	Outagamie	2	Marvin E. Babbitt	Rep.	Seymour
20	Ozaukee		J. Curtis McKay	Rep.	Thiensville
24	Portage		Norman Myhra	Dem.	Stevens Point
12	Price & Taylor		Vincent J. Zellinger	Rep.	Phillips
21	Racine	1	Earl W. Warren	Dem.	Racine
21	Racine	2	Roy E. Naleid	Dem.	Racine
21	Racine	3	Merrill E. Stalbaum	Rep.	Waterford
15	Rock	1	William Merriam	Rep.	Janesville
15	Rock	2	David Blanchard (died Dec. 23, 1962)	Rep.	Edgerton
15	Rock	3	George B. Belting	Rep.	Beloit
23	Rusk, Sawyer, & Washburn		Willis J. Hutnik	Rep.	Tony
27	Sauk		Walter Terry	Rep.	Baraboo
29	Shawano & Menominee		Theodore Abrahamson	Rep.	Tigerton
20	Sheboygan	1	Henry A. Hillemann (res. Sep. 1, 1961)	Dem.	Sheboygan
20	Sheboygan	2	Harry L. Gessert	Rep.	Elkhart Lake
10	St. Croix		William W. Ward	Dem.	New Richmond
16	Vernon		Bernard Lewison	Rep.	Viroqua
22	Walworth		George M. Borg	Rep.	Delavan
13	Washington		Elmer J. Schowalter	Rep.	Jackson
33	Waukesha	1	Vincent R. Mathews	Dem.	Waukesha
33	Waukesha	2	Harold W. Clemens	Rep.	Oconomowoc
14	Waupaca		Richard E. Peterson	Rep.	Clintonville
19	Winnebago	1	William A. Steiger	Rep.	Oshkosh
19	Winnebago	2	Floyd E. Shurbert	Rep.	Oshkosh
19	Winnebago	3	David O. Martin	Rep.	Menasha
24	Wood	1	Raymond F. Heinzen	Rep.	Marshfield
24	Wood	2	Harvey F. Gee	Rep.	Wisconsin Rapids

== Committees ==
=== Senate committees ===
- Senate Standing Committee on Agriculture – J. E. Leverich, chair
- Senate Standing Committee on Conservation – C. Krueger, chair
- Senate Standing Committee on Education – P. P. Carr, chair
- Senate Standing Committee on Governmental and Veterans Affairs – L. P. O'Brien, chair
- Senate Standing Committee on Highways – J. Miller, chair
- Senate Standing Committee on Interstate Cooperation – F. E. Panzer, chair
- Senate Standing Committee on the Judiciary – A. Busby, chair
- Senate Standing Committee on Labor, Taxation, Insurance, and Banking – A. A. Laun, chair
- Senate Standing Committee on Public Welfare – R. Bice, chair
- Senate Special Committee on Committees – C. Dempsey, chair
- Senate Special Committee on Contingent Expenditures – R. La Fave, chair
- Senate Special Committee on Legislative Procedure – F. E. Panzer, chair

=== Assembly committees ===
- Assembly Standing Committee on Agriculture – W. Merriam, chair
- Assembly Standing Committee on Commerce and Manufactures – G. Hipke, chair
- Assembly Standing Committee on Conservation – P. Alfonsi, chair
- Assembly Standing Committee on Contingent Expenditures – L. R. Baumgart, chair
- Assembly Standing Committee on Education – W. B. Calvert, chair
- Assembly Standing Committee on Elections – G. Pommerening, chair
- Assembly Standing Committee on Engrossed Bills – E. J. Schowalter, chair
- Assembly Standing Committee on Enrolled Bills – V. J. Zellinger, chair
- Assembly Standing Committee on Excise and Fees – F. E. Shurbert, chair
- Assembly Standing Committee on Highways – H. A. Harper, chair
- Assembly Standing Committee on Insurance and Banking – K. E. Priebe, chair
- Assembly Standing Committee on the Judiciary – R. E. Peterson, chair
- Assembly Standing Committee on Labor – E. L. Genzmer, chair
- Assembly Standing Committee on Municipalities – P. A. Luedtke, chair
- Assembly Standing Committee on Printing – M. C. Kintz, chair
- Assembly Standing Committee on Public Welfare – W. Terry, chair
- Assembly Standing Committee on Revision – W. E. Owen, chair
- Assembly Standing Committee on Rules – R. Haase, chair
- Assembly Standing Committee on State Affairs – W. J. Hutnik, chair
- Assembly Standing Committee on Taxation – G. B. Belting, chair
- Assembly Standing Committee on Third Reading – C. M. Stauffer, chair
- Assembly Standing Committee on Transportation – B. Lewison, chair
- Assembly Standing Committee on Veterans and Military Affairs – K. Kenyon, chair

=== Joint committees ===
- Joint Standing Committee on Finance – W. Draheim (Sen.) & E. Bidwell (Asm.), co-chairs
- Joint Standing Committee on Revisions, Repeals, and Uniform Laws – G. Lorge (Sen.) & R. Uehling (Asm.), co-chairs
- Joint Legislative Council – D. Blanchard, chair

== Employees ==
=== Senate employees ===
- Chief Clerk: Lawrence R. Larsen
- Sergeant-at-Arms: Harold E. Damon

=== Assembly employees ===
- Chief Clerk: Robert G. Marotz
- Sergeant-at-Arms: Norris J. Kellman
