= 77th Wisconsin Legislature =

Wisconsin legislative term for 1965–1966

←	76th	78th	→
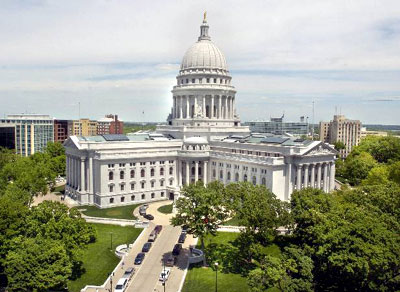
- Wisconsin State Capitol

Overview
- Legislative body: Wisconsin Legislature
- Meeting place: Wisconsin State Capitol
- Term: January 4, 1965 – January 2, 1967
- Election: November 3, 1964

Senate
- Members: 33
- Senate President: Patrick Lucey (D)
- President pro tempore: Frank E. Panzer (R)
- Party control: Republican

Assembly
- Members: 100
- Assembly Speaker: Robert T. Huber (D)
- Speaker pro tempore: George Molinaro (D)
- Party control: Democratic

Sessions
- Regular: January 13, 1965 – January 2, 1967

The Seventy-Seventh Wisconsin Legislature convened from January 13, 1965, to January 2, 1967, in regular session.

This was the first legislative session after the redistricting of the Senate and Assembly according to a decision of the Wisconsin Supreme Court in 1964.

Senators representing even-numbered districts were newly elected for this session and were serving the first two years of a four-year term. Assembly members were elected to a two-year term. Assembly members and even-numbered senators were elected in the general election of November 3, 1964. Senators representing odd-numbered districts were serving the third and fourth year of a four-year term, having been elected in the general election of November 6, 1962.

The governor of Wisconsin during this entire term was Republican Warren P. Knowles, of St. Croix County, serving a two-year term, having won election in the 1964 Wisconsin gubernatorial election.

== Major events ==
- January 4, 1965: Inauguration of Warren P. Knowles as the 37th Governor of Wisconsin.
- January 20, 1965: Second inauguration of Lyndon B. Johnson as President of the United States.
- April 6, 1965: 1965 Wisconsin Spring election:
  - Wisconsin voters approved two amendments to the state constitution:
    - Revising the definition of a lottery.
    - Abolishing the county offices of coroner and surveyor for counties with more than 500,000 people (at the time, only Milwaukee County).
- July 30, 1965: U.S. President Lyndon B. Johnson signed the Social Security Amendments of 1965, creating Medicare and Medicaid.
- January 2, 1966: The Green Bay Packers won the 1965 NFL Championship Game.
- April 5, 1966: 1966 Wisconsin Spring election:
  - Wisconsin voters approved four amendments to the state constitution:
    - To allow state legislators to serve in the military without vacating their legislative office.
    - To allow the legislature to create inferior courts.
    - To eliminate Section 15 of Article VII of the constitution, abolishing the office of justice of the peace.
    - To allow for indebtedness in special districts for public utilities.
- June 22, 1966: Wisconsin Assembly Republican leaders Paul Alfonsi and Willis J. Hutnik were indicted for accepting bribes. Alfonsi was ultimately convicted, but his conviction was overturned by the Wisconsin Supreme Court.
- July 27, 1966: The Wisconsin Supreme Court ruled in the case State v. Milwaukee Braves, Inc., lifting a lower court injunction and allowing the Milwaukee Braves to move to Atlanta.
- August 11, 1966: Wisconsin Supreme Court justice Thomas E. Fairchild resigned after he was confirmed as a judge of the United States Court of Appeals for the Seventh Circuit.
- August 24, 1966: Wisconsin Governor Warren P. Knowles appointed Leo B. Hanley to the Wisconsin Supreme Court, to succeed Thomas E. Fairchild.
- November 8, 1966: 1966 United States general election:
  - Warren P. Knowles (R) re-elected as Governor of Wisconsin.

== Major legislation ==
- December 30, 1965: An Act ... relating to a public defender at appellate level, 1965 Act 479. Created the position of state public defender and placed the role under supervision of the Wisconsin Supreme Court.
- 1965 Joint Resolution 2: Second legislative passage of a proposed amendment to the state constitution to revise the definition of lotteries. This amendment was ratified by voters at the April 1965 election.
- 1965 Joint Resolution 5: Second legislative passage of a proposed amendment to the state constitution to abolish the county offices of coroner and surveyor in counties with a population greater than 500,000 (at the time, this only applied to Milwaukee County). This amendment was ratified by voters at the April 1965 election.
- 1965 Joint Resolution 14: Second legislative passage of a proposed amendment to the state constitution to allow legislators to serve in the military without vacating their legislative seat. This amendment was ratified by voters at the April 1966 election.
- 1965 Joint Resolution 50: Second legislative passage of two proposed amendments to the state constitution to allow the legislature to create inferior courts and to abolish the office of justice of the peace. Both amendments were ratified by voters at the April 1966 election.

== Party summary ==
=== Senate summary ===
Senate partisan composition Democratic: 13 seats Republican: 20 seats

	Party (Shading indicates majority caucus)		Total	
	Dem.	Rep.	Total	Vacant
End of previous Legislature	10	22	32	1
Start of Reg. Session	13	20	33	0
Final voting share	39.39%	60.61%		
Beginning of the next Legislature	12	21	33	0

=== Assembly summary ===
Assembly partisan composition Democratic: 53 seats Republican: 47 seats

	Party (Shading indicates majority caucus)		Total	
	Dem.	Rep.	Total	Vacant
End of previous Legislature	47	53	100	0
Start of Reg. Session	52	48	100	0
From Feb. 17, 1965 (Note: Democrat Allen J. Flannigan (Milwaukee County) died.)	51	48	99	1
From May 11, 1965 (Note: Democrat William A. Johnson (Milwaukee County) was sworn in to replace Allen J. Flannigan.)	52	48	100	0
From Sep. 15, 1965 (Note: Republican Robert Haase (Florence & Marinette County) resigned to become state commissioner of insurance.)	52	47	99	1
From Nov. 24, 1965 (Note: Democrat Leslie R. Stevenson (Florence & Marinette County) was sworn in to replace Robert Haase.)	53	47	100	0
Final voting share	53%	47%		
Beginning of the next Legislature	48	52	100	0

== Sessions ==
- Regular session: January 13, 1965 – January 2, 1967

== Leaders ==
=== Senate leadership ===
- President of the Senate: Patrick Lucey (D)
- President pro tempore: Frank E. Panzer (R–Oakfield)
- Majority leader: Robert P. Knowles (R–New Richmond)
- Minority leader: Richard J. Zaborski (D–Milwaukee)

=== Assembly leadership ===
- Speaker of the Assembly: Robert T. Huber (D–West Allis)
- Speaker pro tempore: George Molinaro (D–Kenosha)
- Majority leader: Frank Nikolay (D–Abbotsford)
- Minority leader: Robert Haase (R–Marinette) (resigned Sep. 15, 1965)
  - Paul Alfonsi (R–Minocqua) (Oct. 4, 1965 – Jul. 8, 1966)

== Members ==
=== Members of the Senate ===
Members of the Senate for the Seventy-Seventh Wisconsin Legislature:

Senate partisan representation Democratic: 13 seats Republican: 20 seats

Dist.	Counties	Senator	Residence	Party
01	Door, Kewaunee, & Manitowoc	Alex Meunier	Sturgeon Bay	Rep.
02	Southern Brown & Calumet	Robert W. Warren	Green Bay	Rep.
03	Milwaukee (Southwest City)	Casimir Kendziorski	Milwaukee	Dem.
04	Milwaukee (North County)	Jerris Leonard	Milwaukee	Rep.
05	Milwaukee (Northwest City)	Wilfred Schuele	Milwaukee	Dem.
06	Milwaukee (North City)	Martin J. Schreiber	Milwaukee	Dem.
07	Milwaukee (Southeast County & Southeast City)	Leland McParland	Cudahy	Dem.
08	Milwaukee (Western County)	Allen Busby	West Milwaukee	Rep.
09	Milwaukee (City Downtown)	Norman Sussman	Milwaukee	Dem.
10	Buffalo, Burnett, Pepin, Pierce, Polk, & St. Croix	Robert P. Knowles	New Richmond	Rep.
11	Milwaukee (Western City)	Richard J. Zaborski	Milwaukee	Dem.
12	Clark, Forest, Lincoln, Oneida, Taylor, & Vilas	Clifford Krueger	Merrill	Rep.
13	Eastern Dodge, Jefferson, & Washington	Frank E. Panzer	Oakfield	Rep.
14	Outagamie & Waupaca	Gerald Lorge	Bear Creek	Rep.
15	Eastern Rock & Walworth	Peter P. Carr	Janesville	Rep.
16	Most of Dane & Western Rock	Carl W. Thompson	Stoughton	Dem.
17	Grant, Green, Iowa, Lafayette, & Richland	Gordon Roseleip	Darlington	Rep.
18	Fond du Lac & Western Dodge	Walter G. Hollander	Rosendale	Rep.
19	Winnebago	William Draheim	Neenah	Rep.
20	Ozaukee & Sheboygan	Ernest Keppler	Sheboygan Falls	Rep.
21	Racine (City & Southeast County)	Henry Dorman	Racine	Dem.
22	Kenosha	Joseph Lourigan	Kenosha	Dem.
23	Barron, Chippewa, Dunn, & Washburn	Holger Rasmusen	Spooner	Rep.
24	Green Lake, Portage, Waushara, & Wood	William C. Hansen	Stevens Point	Dem.
25	Ashland, Bayfield, Douglas, Iron, Price, Rusk, & Sawyer	Frank Christopherson Jr.	Superior	Dem.
26	Dane (Madison)	Fred Risser	Madison	Dem.
27	Adams, Columbia, Juneau, Marquette, & Sauk	Jess Miller	Richland Center	Rep.
28	Southwest Milwaukee, Most of Racine, & Southern Waukesha	Taylor Benson	Raymond	Dem.
29	Marathon, Menominee, & Shawano	Charles F. Smith Jr.	Wausau	Rep.
30	Northern Brown, Florence, Langlade, Marinette, & Oconto	Reuben La Fave	Oconto	Rep.
31	Eau Claire, Jackson, Monroe, & Trempealeau	J. Earl Leverich	Sparta	Rep.
32	Crawford, La Crosse, & Vernon	Raymond Bice Sr.	La Crosse	Rep.
33	Waukesha (Northern half)	Chester Dempsey	Hartland	Rep.

=== Members of the Assembly ===
Members of the Assembly for the Seventy-Seventh Wisconsin Legislature:

Assembly partisan composition Democratic: 53 seats Republican: 47 seats

Milwaukee County districts

Senate Dist.	County	Dist.	Representative	Party	Residence
27	Adams, Juneau, & Marquette		Louis C. Romell	Rep.	Adams
25	Ashland, Bayfield, & Iron		Bernard E. Gehrmann	Rep.	Ashland
23	Barron & Washburn		Fred J. Moser	Dem.	Cumberland
02	Brown	1	Jerome Quinn	Rep.	Green Bay
02	Brown	2	Lawrence J. Kafka	Rep.	New Denmark
02	Brown	3	Cletus J. Vanderperren	Dem.	Green Bay
10	Buffalo, Pepin, & Pierce		Milton S. Buchli	Dem.	Montana
10	Burnett & Polk		Harvey L. Dueholm	Dem.	Luck
02	Calumet		Wilmer H. Struebing	Rep.	Brillion
23	Chippewa		Bruce Peloquin	Dem.	Chippewa Falls
12	Clark		Frank Nikolay	Dem.	Abbotsford
27	Columbia		Everett Bidwell	Rep.	Portage
32	Crawford & Vernon		Bernard Lewison	Rep.	Viroqua
26	Dane	1	Norman C. Anderson	Dem.	Madison
26	Dane	2	Edward Nager	Dem.	Madison
26	Dane	3	Robert Uehling	Rep.	Madison
16	Dane	4	Jerome L. Blaska	Dem.	Sun Prairie
16	Dane	5	David D. O'Malley	Dem.	Waunakee
13	Dodge	1	Esther S. Doughty	Rep.	Horicon
18	Dodge	2	Elmer C. Nitschke	Rep.	Beaver Dam
01	Door & Kewaunee		Lawrence Johnson	Rep.	Algoma
25	Douglas		Reino A. Perala	Dem.	Superior
23	Dunn		Francis L. Peterson	Rep.	Boyceville
31	Eau Claire	1	Thomas H. Barland	Rep.	Eau Claire
31	Eau Claire	2	Louis V. Mato	Dem.	Fairchild
30	Florence & Marinette		Robert Haase (res. Sep. 15, 1965)	Rep.	Marinette
30	Florence & Marinette		Leslie R. Stevenson (from Nov. 24, 1965)	Dem.	Marinette
18	Fond du Lac	1	Earl F. McEssy	Rep.	Fond du Lac
18	Fond du Lac	2	William S. Schwefel	Rep.	Oakfield
12	Forest, Oneida, & Vilas		Paul Alfonsi	Rep.	Minocqua
17	Grant		James N. Azim Jr.	Rep.	Muscoda
17	Green & Lafayette		G. Fred Galli	Rep.	Monroe
24	Green Lake & Waushara		Franklin M. Jahnke	Rep.	Markesan
17	Iowa & Richland		Gregor J. Bock	Rep.	Highland
31	Jackson & Trempealeau		John Q. Radcliffe	Dem.	Strum
13	Jefferson		Byron F. Wackett	Rep.	Watertown
22	Kenosha	1	George Molinaro	Dem.	Kenosha
22	Kenosha	2	Earl H. Elfers	Dem.	Salem
32	La Crosse	1	D. Russell Wartinbee	Rep.	La Crosse
32	La Crosse	2	Norbert Nuttelman	Rep.	West Salem
30	Langlade & Oconto		Milton McDougal	Dem.	Oconto Falls
12	Lincoln & Taylor		Joseph Sweda	Dem.	Lublin
01	Manitowoc	1	Eugene S. Kaufman	Dem.	Manitowoc
01	Manitowoc	2	Everett E. Bolle	Dem.	Two Rivers
29	Marathon	1	Ben A. Riehle	Dem.	Athens
29	Marathon	2	Dave Obey	Dem.	Wausau
29	Menominee & Shawano		Herbert J. Grover	Dem.	Shawano
06	Milwaukee	1	Mark Lipscomb Jr.	Dem.	Milwaukee
05	Milwaukee	2	Joseph E. Jones	Dem.	Milwaukee
04	Milwaukee	3	Angelo F. Greco	Dem.	Milwaukee
09	Milwaukee	4	Frank E. Schaeffer Jr.	Dem.	Milwaukee
06	Milwaukee	5	Thomas M. Schaus	Dem.	Milwaukee
09	Milwaukee	6	Lloyd Barbee	Dem.	Milwaukee
06	Milwaukee	7	Allen J. Flannigan (died Feb. 17, 1965)	Dem.	Milwaukee
06	Milwaukee	7	William A. Johnson (from May 11, 1965)	Dem.	Milwaukee
11	Milwaukee	8	Adrian Manders	Dem.	Milwaukee
05	Milwaukee	9	Edward F. Mertz	Dem.	Milwaukee
11	Milwaukee	10	Fred Kessler	Dem.	Milwaukee
03	Milwaukee	11	Raymond J. Tobiasz	Dem.	Milwaukee
03	Milwaukee	12	Albert R. Tadych	Dem.	Milwaukee
09	Milwaukee	13	Ronald G. Parys	Dem.	Milwaukee
03	Milwaukee	14	Robert P. Kordus	Dem.	Milwaukee
05	Milwaukee	15	James McCann	Dem.	Milwaukee
11	Milwaukee	16	Wayne F. Whittow	Dem.	Milwaukee
07	Milwaukee	17	John E. McCormick	Dem.	Milwaukee
04	Milwaukee	18	Louis J. Ceci	Rep.	Milwaukee
07	Milwaukee	19	Daniel D. Hanna	Dem.	Milwaukee
08	Milwaukee	20	Glen Pommerening	Rep.	Wauwatosa
08	Milwaukee	21	Richard J. Lynch	Dem.	West Allis
08	Milwaukee	22	Robert T. Huber	Dem.	West Allis
28	Milwaukee	23	Robert Schmidt	Dem.	Greendale
07	Milwaukee	24	William P. Atkinson	Dem.	South Milwaukee
04	Milwaukee	25	Nile Soik	Rep.	Whitefish Bay
31	Monroe		Kyle Kenyon	Rep.	Tomah
14	Outagamie	1	Harold V. Froehlich	Rep.	Appleton
14	Outagamie	2	William J. Rogers	Dem.	Kaukauna
14	Outagamie	3	Ervin Conradt	Rep.	Shiocton
20	Ozaukee		J. Curtis McKay	Rep.	Thiensville
24	Portage		Norman Myhra	Dem.	Stevens Point
25	Price, Rusk & Sawyer		Willis J. Hutnik	Rep.	Ladysmith
21	Racine	1	Earl W. Warren	Dem.	Racine
21	Racine	2	Manny S. Brown	Dem.	Racine
28	Racine	3	Merrill E. Stalbaum	Rep.	Waterford
15	Rock	1	Lewis T. Mittness	Dem.	Janesville
16	Rock	2	Carolyn Blanchard	Rep.	Edgerton
15	Rock	3	George B. Belting	Rep.	Beloit
27	Sauk		Walter Terry	Rep.	Baraboo
20	Sheboygan	1	Kenneth Kunde	Dem.	Sheboygan
20	Sheboygan	2	Harry L. Gessert	Rep.	Elkhart Lake
10	St. Croix		Donald L. Iverson	Dem.	Hudson
22	Walworth		George M. Borg	Rep.	Delavan
13	Washington		Frederick C. Schroeder	Rep.	West Bend
33	Waukesha	1	Kenneth Merkel	Rep.	Brookfield
33	Waukesha	2	Harold W. Clemens	Rep.	Oconomowoc
33	Waukesha	3	Vincent R. Mathews	Dem.	Waukesha
28	Waukesha	4	John C. Shabaz	Rep.	New Berlin
14	Waupaca		Gerald K. Anderson	Rep.	Waupaca
19	Winnebago	1	William A. Steiger	Rep.	Oshkosh
19	Winnebago	2	Floyd E. Shurbert	Rep.	Oshkosh
19	Winnebago	3	David O. Martin	Rep.	Menasha
24	Wood	1	Raymond F. Heinzen	Rep.	Marshfield
24	Wood	2	Harvey F. Gee	Rep.	Wisconsin Rapids

== Committees ==
=== Senate committees ===
- Senate Standing Committee on Agriculture – J. E. Leverich, chair
- Senate Standing Committee on Conservation – C. Krueger, chair
- Senate Standing Committee on Education – P. P. Carr, chair
- Senate Standing Committee on Governmental and Veterans Affairs – W. Draheim, chair
- Senate Standing Committee on Highways – J. Miller, chair
- Senate Standing Committee on Interstate Cooperation – F. E. Panzer, chair
- Senate Standing Committee on the Judiciary – A. Busby, chair
- Senate Standing Committee on Labor, Taxation, Insurance, and Banking – G. Lorge, chair
- Senate Standing Committee on Public Welfare – C. Dempsey, chair
- Senate Standing Committee on Senate Organization – F. E. Panzer, chair
- Senate Special Committee on Committees – R. Bice, chair
- Senate Special Committee on Contingent Expenditures – R. La Fave, chair
- Senate Special Committee on Legislative Procedure – F. E. Panzer, chair

=== Assembly committees ===
- Assembly Standing Committee on Agriculture – D. D. O'Malley, chair
- Assembly Standing Committee on Assembly Organization – R. T. Huber, chair
- Assembly Standing Committee on Commerce and Manufactures – E. S. Kaufman, chair
- Assembly Standing Committee on Conservation – N. C. Anderson, chair
- Assembly Standing Committee on Contingent Expenditures – K. Kunde, chair
- Assembly Standing Committee on Education – A. F. Greco, chair
- Assembly Standing Committee on Elections – V. R. Mathews, chair
- Assembly Standing Committee on Engrossed Bills – E. H. Elfers, chair
- Assembly Standing Committee on Enrolled Bills – L. Barbee, chair
- Assembly Standing Committee on Excise and Fees – E. E. Bolle, chair
- Assembly Standing Committee on Highways – J. L. Blaska, chair
- Assembly Standing Committee on Insurance and Banking – J. E. McCormick, chair
- Assembly Standing Committee on the Judiciary – F. Nikolay, chair
- Assembly Standing Committee on Labor – J. E. Jones, chair
- Assembly Standing Committee on Municipalities – F. E. Schaeffer, chair
- Assembly Standing Committee on Printing – B. A. Riehle, chair
- Assembly Standing Committee on Public Welfare – H. L. Dueholm, chair
- Assembly Standing Committee on Revision – L. V. Mato, chair
- Assembly Standing Committee on Rules – F. Nikolay, chair
- Assembly Standing Committee on State Affairs – E. W. Warren, chair
- Assembly Standing Committee on Taxation – R. A. Perala, chair
- Assembly Standing Committee on Third Reading – M. Lipscomb, chair
- Assembly Standing Committee on Transportation – R. J. Tobiasz, chair
- Assembly Standing Committee on Veterans and Military Affairs – N. Myhra, chair

=== Joint committees ===
- Joint Standing Committee on Finance – W. G. Hollander (Sen.) & G. Molinaro (Asm.), co-chairs
- Joint Standing Committee on Legislative Organization – R. Haase, chair
- Joint Standing Committee on Revisions, Repeals, and Uniform Laws – E. Keppler (Sen.) & E. Nager (Asm.), co-chairs
- Joint Legislative Council – R. T. Huber, chair

== Employees ==
=== Senate employees ===
- Chief Clerk: Lawrence R. Larsen (died March 2, 1965)
  - William P. Nugent
- Sergeant-at-Arms: Harold E. Damon

=== Assembly employees ===
- Chief Clerk: James P. Buckley
- Sergeant-at-Arms: Thomas H. Browne

== Changes from the 76th Legislature ==
New districts for the 77th Legislature were defined in the case of State ex rel. Reynolds v. Zimmerman, decided by the Wisconsin Supreme Court in May 1964. This was the first time redistricting in Wisconsin was performed by a court.

=== Senate redistricting ===
==== Summary of Senate changes ====
- Only 5 districts were left unchanged.
- 7 counties were split into two or more districts, the most since the 1892 redistricting.
- 18 districts comprised at least some split county component, the most in the history of the state.
- Brown County went from having its own district to being split between two shared districts (2, 30).
- Kenosha County became its own district (22) after previously having been in a shared district with Walworth.
- Milwaukee County went from having 8 districts to 8 (3, 4, 5, 6, 7, 8, 9, 11) plus part of a 9th (28).
- Rock County went from having its own district to being split between two shared districts (15, 16).
- Winnebago County became its own district (19) after previously having been in a shared district with Calumet.

==== Senate districts ====
Map after redistricting, changes highlighted. Territory which was moved to a new district Districts which were entirely unchanged Districts which contain none of their prior territory

Dist.	76th Legislature	77th Legislature
1	Door, Kewaunee, Manitowoc counties	Door, Kewaunee, Manitowoc counties
2	Brown County	Brown (south & east), Calumet counties
3	Milwaukee County (city south)	Milwaukee County (city southwest)
4	Milwaukee County (northern quarter)	Milwaukee County (north)
5	Milwaukee County (city northwest)	Milwaukee County (city northwest)
6	Milwaukee County (city northeast)	Milwaukee County (city north)
7	Milwaukee County (southern quarter)	Milwaukee County (southeast)
8	Milwaukee County (middle-west)	Milwaukee County (middle-west)
9	Milwaukee County (city center)	Milwaukee County (city center)
10	Buffalo, Dunn, Pepin, Pierce, St. Croix counties	Buffalo, Burnett, Pepin, Pierce, Polk, St. Croix counties
11	Milwaukee County (city west)	Milwaukee County (city west)
12	Ashland, Iron, Price, Rusk, Sawyer, Vilas counties	Clark, Forest, Lincoln, Oneida, Taylor, Vilas counties
13	Dodge, Washington counties	Dodge (east half), Jefferson, Washington counties
14	Outagamie, Waupaca counties	Outagamie, Waupaca counties
15	Rock County	Rock (east half), Walworth counties
16	Dane County (excluding Madison)	Dane (excluding Madison), Rock (west half) counties
17	Grant, Green, Iowa, Lafayette counties	Grant, Green, Iowa, Lafayette, Richland counties
18	Fond du Lac, Green Lake, Waushara counties	Dodge (west half), Fond du Lac counties
19	Calumet, Winnebago counties	Winnebago County
20	Ozaukee, Sheboygan counties	Ozaukee, Sheboygan counties
21	Racine County	Racine County (southeast)
22	Kenosha, Walworth counties	Kenosha County
23	Barron, Burnett, Polk, Rusk, Sawyer, Washburn counties	Barron, Chippewa, Dunn, Washburn counties
24	Clark, Portage, Wood counties	Green Lake, Portage, Waushara, Wood counties
25	Ashland, Bayfield, Douglas counties	Ashland, Bayfield, Douglas, Iron, Price, Rusk, Sawyer counties
26	Dane County (Madison)	Dane County (Madison)
27	Columbia, Crawford, Richland, Sauk counties	Adams, Columbia, Juneau, Marquette, Sauk counties
28	Chippewa, Eau Claire counties	Milwaukee (southwest), Racine (most), Waukesha (south half) counties
29	Marathon, Menominee, Shawano counties	Marathon, Menominee, Shawano counties
30	Florence, Forest, Langlade, Marinette, Oconto counties	Brown (north & west), Florence, Langlade, Marinette, Oconto counties
31	Adams, Juneau, Monroe, Marquette, Vernon counties	Eau Claire, Jackson, Monroe, Trempealeau counties
32	Jackson, La Crosse, Trempealeau counties	Crawford, La Crosse, Vernon counties
33	Jefferson, Waukesha counties	Waukesha County (north half)

=== Assembly redistricting ===
==== Summary of Assembly changes ====
- Only 22 districts were left unchanged.
- Barron County went from having its own district to being in a shared district with Washburn.
- Douglas County went from having 2 districts to 1.
- Green County went from having its own district to being in a shared district with Lafayette.
- Lincoln County went from having its own district to being in a shared district with Taylor.
- Marinette County went from having its own district to being in a shared district with Florence.
- Oconto County went from having its own district to being in a shared district with Langlade.
- Milwaukee County went from having 24 districts to 25.
- Outagamie County went from having 2 districts to 3.
- Waukesha County went from having 2 districts to 3.

==== Assembly districts ====
County	Districts in 76th Legislature	Districts in 77th Legislature	Change
Adams	Shared with Juneau & Marquette	Shared with Juneau & Marquette	Steady
Ashland	Shared with Bayfield	Shared with Bayfield & Iron	▼
Barron	1 District	Shared with Washburn	▼
Bayfield	Shared with Ashland	Shared with Ashland & Iron	▼
Brown	3 Districts	3 Districts	Steady
Buffalo	Shared with Pepin & Pierce	Shared with Pepin & Pierce	Steady
Burnett	Shared with Polk	Shared with Polk	Steady
Calumet	1 District	1 District	Steady
Chippewa	1 District	1 District	Steady
Clark	1 District	1 District	Steady
Columbia	1 District	1 District	Steady
Crawford	Shared with Richland	Shared with Vernon	Steady
Dane	5 Districts	5 Districts	Steady
Dodge	2 Districts	2 Districts	Steady
Door	Shared with Kewaunee	Shared with Kewaunee	Steady
Douglas	2 Districts	1 District	▼
Dunn	1 District	1 District	Steady
Eau Claire	2 Districts	2 Districts	Steady
Florence	Shared with Forest & Langlade	Shared with Marinette	Steady
Fond du Lac	2 Districts	2 Districts	Steady
Forest	Shared with Florence & Langlade	Shared with Oneida & Vilas	Steady
Grant	1 District	1 District	Steady
Green	1 District	Shared with Lafayette	▼
Green Lake	Shared with Waushara	Shared with Waushara	Steady
Iowa	Shared with Lafayette	Shared with Richland	Steady
Iron	Shared with Oneida & Vilas	Shared with Ashland & Bayfield	Steady
Jackson	Shared with Trempealeau	Shared with Trempealeau	Steady
Jefferson	1 District	1 District	Steady
Juneau	Shared with Adams & Marquette	Shared with Adams & Marquette	Steady
Kenosha	2 Districts	2 Districts	Steady
Kewaunee	Shared with Door	Shared with Door	Steady
La Crosse	2 Districts	2 Districts	Steady
Lafayette	Shared with Iowa	Shared with Green	Steady
Langlade	Shared with Florence & Forest	Shared with Oconto	Steady
Lincoln	1 District	Shared with Taylor	▼
Manitowoc	2 Districts	2 Districts	Steady
Marathon	2 Districts	2 Districts	Steady
Marinette	1 District	Shared with Florence	▼
Marquette	Shared with Adams & Juneau	Shared with Adams & Juneau	Steady
Menominee	Shared with Shawano	Shared with Shawano	Steady
Milwaukee	24 Districts	25 Districts	▲
Monroe	1 District	1 District	Steady
Oconto	1 District	Shared with Langlade	▼
Oneida	Shared with Iron & Vilas	Shared with Forest & Vilas	Steady
Outagamie	2 Districts	3 Districts	▲
Ozaukee	1 District	1 District	Steady
Pepin	Shared with Buffalo & Pierce	Shared with Buffalo & Pierce	Steady
Pierce	Shared with Buffalo & Pepin	Shared with Buffalo & Pepin	Steady
Polk	Shared with Burnett	Shared with Burnett	Steady
Portage	1 District	1 District	Steady
Price	Shared with Taylor	Shared with Rusk & Sawyer	Steady
Racine	3 Districts	3 Districts	Steady
Richland	Shared with Crawford	Shared with Iowa	Steady
Rock	3 Districts	3 Districts	Steady
Rusk	Shared with Sawyer & Washburn	Shared with Price & Sawyer	Steady
Sauk	1 District	1 District	Steady
Sawyer	Shared with Rusk & Washburn	Shared with Price & Rusk	Steady
Shawano	Shared with Menominee	Shared with Menominee	Steady
Sheboygan	2 Districts	2 Districts	Steady
St. Croix	1 District	1 District	Steady
Taylor	Shared with Price	Shared with Lincoln	Steady
Trempealeau	Shared with Jackson	Shared with Jackson	Steady
Vernon	1 District	Shared with Crawford	Steady
Vilas	Shared with Iron & Oneida	Shared with Forest & Oneida	Steady
Walworth	1 District	1 District	Steady
Washburn	Shared with Rusk & Sawyer	Shared with Barron	Steady
Washington	1 District	1 District	Steady
Waukesha	2 Districts	4 Districts	▲
Waupaca	1 District	1 District	Steady
Waushara	Shared with Green Lake	Shared with Green Lake	Steady
Winnebago	3 Districts	3 Districts	Steady
Wood	2 District	2 District	Steady
