= Adams Center =

Adams Center may refer to places in the United States:

- Adams Center, New York, census-designated place
- Adams Center, Wisconsin, ghost town
- Adams Center (Montana), hall on the campus of the University of Montana
