= Wisconsin School for the Blind and Visually Impaired =

Coordinates: 42°39′53″N 89°02′23″W

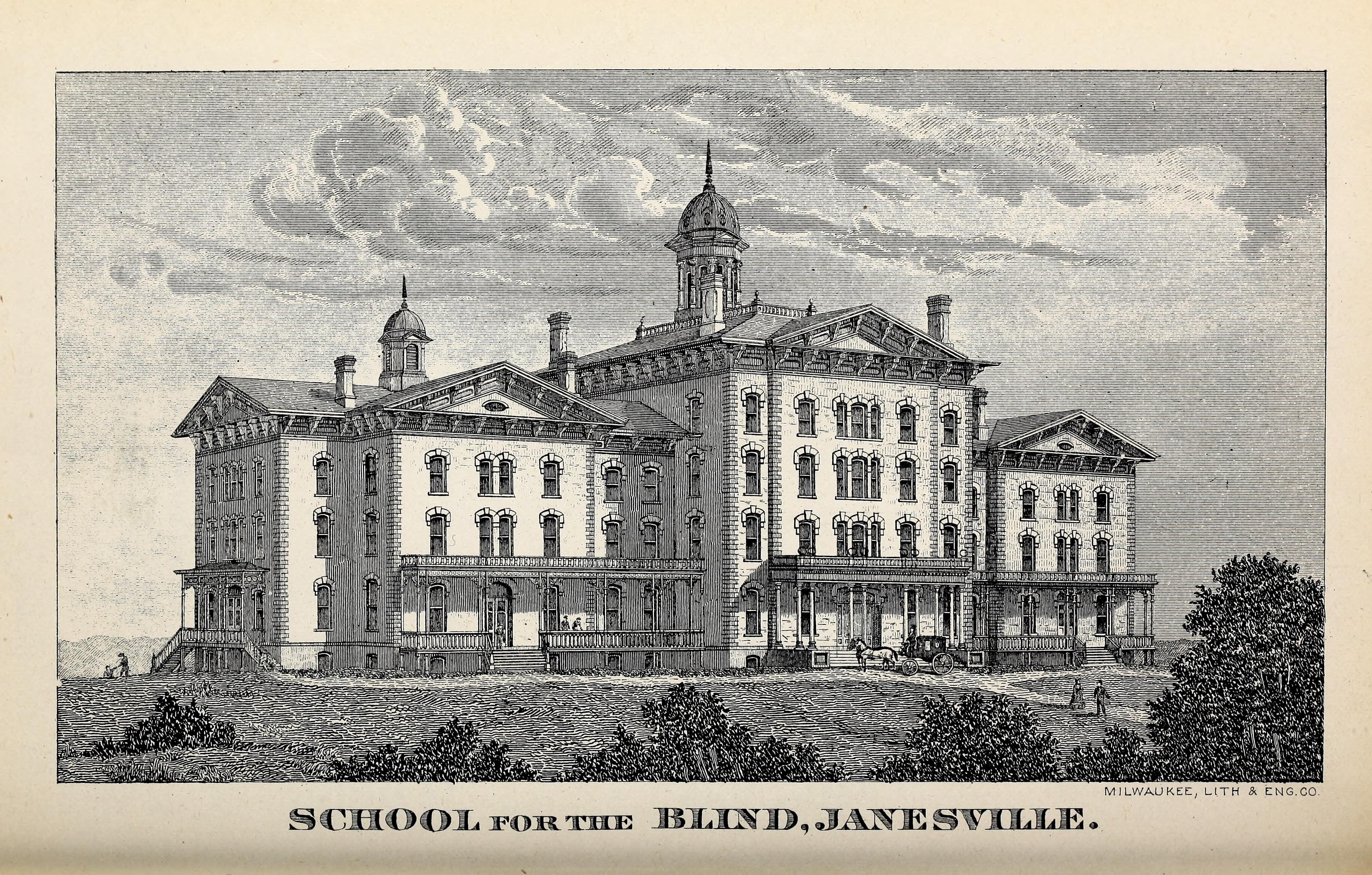
This picture of the school was published in 1893.

The Wisconsin School for the Blind and Visually Impaired (WSBVI) is a state school that specializes in teaching the visually impaired. It is operated by the Wisconsin Center for the Blind and Visually Impaired (WCBVI), a unit of the Wisconsin Department of Public Instruction. Founded in 1849, the school is located in Janesville, Wisconsin.

Originally known as the Wisconsin Institute for the Education of the Blind, the school changed its name in 1885 to the Wisconsin School for the Blind. In 1945 it became the Wisconsin School for the Visually Handicapped, and in 2012 it was renamed the Wisconsin School for the Blind and Visually Impaired.

Wisconsin youth who are blind or visually impaired are eligible to attend the regular school year program of the Wisconsin School for the Blind and Visually Impaired, which operates as part of the free public school system of the state. WSBVI is a residential school whose curriculum is both academic and applied. The school maintains a core academic curriculum, along with teaching functional life skills, including specialized skills related to blindness, vocational skills, physical education and recreation, and personal management. WSBVI cooperates with the School District of Janesville and Blackhawk Technical College. Most of the students in the WSBVI program have a disability in addition to visual impairment.

The school has a residential life, as in a dormitory program.

== Notable alumni ==
- John Kostuck, businessman/piano tuner, legislator
- Reino A. Perala, lawyer, hotel owner, legislator
