= G. Fred Galli =

American politician

Member of the Wisconsin State Assembly
- In office January 4, 1965 – January 10, 1967
- Preceded by: District established
- Succeeded by: Joseph E. Tregoning
- Constituency: Green–Lafayette district
- In office April 13, 1964 – January 4, 1965
- Preceded by: Christian M. Stauffer
- Succeeded by: District abolished
- Constituency: Green County district

Personal details
- Born: May 7, 1902 Corzoneso, Switzerland
- Died: January 10, 1967 (aged 64)
- Party: Republican
- Education: UW-Madison
- Profession: Cheesemaker, Politician

G. Fred Galli (May 7, 1902 – January 10, 1967) was an American cheesemaker and politician. He served as a member of the Wisconsin State Assembly in the 1960s.

== Early life and career ==
Galli was born in Corzoneso, Switzerland, and attended school in Laupen, Switzerland. He took dairying courses in Berne, Switzerland, and at the University of Wisconsin–Madison. He was a cheesemaker and grader in Monroe, Wisconsin, and managed the Cheese Producers Cooperative Association. He was a cheese judge at state fairs and at State Cheesemakers conventions. He served as director of the Monroe Chamber of Commerce and was a charter member and director of the Wisconsin Cheese Foundation.

== Political career ==
Galli served as an alderman from 1952 to 1960 and as president of the Monroe Common Council from 1956 to 1958. In 1964, Galli was elected in a special election as a Republican to the Wisconsin State Assembly to fill the vacancy caused by the death of Christ M. Stauffer. Galli was reelected in 1964 and 1966, and served in the Assembly until his death in 1967.
