= Thomas M. Schaus =

American politician

Thomas M. Schaus (born June 7, 1937, in Milwaukee, Wisconsin), was a member of the Wisconsin State Assembly. He graduated from West Division High School as well as Marquette University and the University of Wisconsin Law School. Schaus also served in the United States Marine Corps Reserve. He was a member of the Knights of Columbus and the Society of the Holy Name. He practiced law in Milwaukee. He died on May 11, 2004.

== Political career ==
Schaus was elected to the Assembly in 1964. He was a Democrat.
