= Paul Dailey Jr. =

American politician

Paul Dailey Jr. (1915-1990) was a former member of the Wisconsin State Assembly.

== Biography ==
Dailey was born on January 20, 1915, in Elcho, Wisconsin. He attended the University of Wisconsin–River Falls and the University of Minnesota. He died on March 3, 1990.

== Career ==
Dailey was elected to the Assembly in 1962. Additionally, he was a member of the school board and President of Elcho. He was a Republican.
