= Alexander R. Grant =

American politician (1925–2001)

Alexander R. Grant (November 28, 1925 – July 22, 2001) was a member of the Wisconsin State Assembly.

== Biography ==
Grant was born on November 28, 1925, in Chicago, Illinois and named after his father, who was the founder of what later became Grant Thornton LLP. He attended Madison West High School in Madison, Wisconsin, before graduating from the University of Wisconsin-Madison. During World War II and the Korean War, he served in the United States Navy. He died on July 22, 2001.

== Political career ==
Grant was elected to the assembly in 1960 and re-elected in 1962, but was defeated in the 1964 primary election by Lawrence J. Kafka. In addition, he was district attorney of Brown County, Wisconsin. He was a Republican. He then served as a Wisconsin Circuit Court judge from Brown County, Wisconsin, from 1982 to 1990.
