= Robert I. Johnson =

American politician (1928–2020)

Robert Iver Johnson (May 24, 1928 – July 18, 2020) was an American politician who was a member of the Wisconsin State Assembly.

== Biography ==
Robert Iver Johnson was born in Mondovi, Wisconsin on May 24, 1928. He would attend the University of Wisconsin-Madison. During the Korean War, he served in the United States Army. Johnson died in Mondovi on July 18, 2020, at the age of 92.

== Political career ==
Johnson was elected to the Assembly in 1960 and was re-elected in 1962. He was a Republican. Johnson ran for U.S. Senate in 1968, and for the 30th Assembly special election in 1977, losing in the Republican primary both times.
