= Mark Ryan (Wisconsin politician) =

American politician

Mark W. Ryan (November 9, 1924 – February 18, 1985) was an American politician who was a member of the Wisconsin State Assembly.

== Biography ==
Ryan was born in Milwaukee, Wisconsin. He attended Washington High School, as well as Wisconsin State College of Milwaukee, Spencerian College and the University of Wisconsin–Milwaukee. During World War II, he served in the United States Navy. Ryan was a member of the Veterans of Foreign Wars, the American Legion and Catholic War Veterans, as well as the Knights of Columbus and the Fraternal Order of Eagles.

== Political career ==
Ryan was elected to the Assembly in 1960. He was a Democrat.
