= Richard J. Lynch =

American law enforcement officer and politician

Richard J. Lynch (June 11, 1921 – May 30, 1997) was an American law enforcement officer and politician.

Born in Milwaukee, Wisconsin, Lynch graduated from West Allis High School. He then served in the United States Army during World War II. Lynch worked for the Milwaukee County Sheriff department. In 1963, 1965, and 1967, Lynch served in the Wisconsin State Assembly as a Democrat. Lynch died in Milwaukee, Wisconsin.
