= Charles F. Smith Jr. =

American politician

Charles Smith Jr.

Member of the Wisconsin Senate from the 29th district
- In office 1963–1967
- Succeeded by: Walter Chilsen

Personal details
- Born: July 16, 1918 Rhinelander, Wisconsin, U.S.
- Died: April 17, 2001 (aged 82) Wausau, Wisconsin, U.S.
- Party: Republican
- Education: University of Wisconsin–Madison
- Profession: Attorney

Charles F. Smith Jr. (July 16, 1918 – April 17, 2001) was a Republican member of the Wisconsin Senate, representing the 29th District from 1963 to 1967. He served on the Wausau, Wisconsin Common Council and the Marathon County, Wisconsin Board of Supervisors and was its chairman. Smith practiced law. He died in Wausau, Wisconsin.

Smith graduated from the University of Wisconsin–Madison with a B.A. in 1941, and a LL.B. in 1948. He was a veteran of World War II, serving in the Army overseas for four years.

He was a member of the Elks Lodge, American Legion, and the local Rotary Club.
