= Merlin J. Peterson =

American politician

Merlin Julius Peterson (December 30, 1901 – February 27, 1977) was a member of the Wisconsin State Assembly.

== Biography ==
Peterson was born on December 30, 1901, in Pigeon, Wisconsin. He attended school in Black River Falls, Wisconsin. Peterson was a stock buyer. Later, he joined the Wisconsin State Patrol. He died on February 27, 1977, in Black River Falls, Wisconsin.

== Political career ==
Peterson was elected to the Assembly in 1960 and re-elected in 1962. He was a Republican.
