= Norman Sussman =

American politician (1905–1969)

Member of the Wisconsin Senate from the 9th district
- In office January 2, 1961 – April 20, 1969
- Preceded by: Henry Maier
- Succeeded by: Ronald G. Parys

Member of the Wisconsin State Assembly from the Milwaukee 2nd district
- In office January 7, 1957 – January 2, 1961
- Preceded by: Walton Bryan Stewart
- Succeeded by: Frank G. Dionesopulos

Personal details
- Born: May 26, 1905 Philadelphia, Pennsylvania, U.S.
- Died: April 20, 1969 (aged 63) Doctors Hospital, Milwaukee, Wisconsin, U.S.
- Cause of death: Heart attack
- Resting place: Spring Hill Cemetery, Milwaukee, Wisconsin
- Party: Democratic

Norman Sussman (May 26, 1905 – April 20, 1969) was an American grocer and Democratic politician. He was a member of the Wisconsin State Senate from 1961 until his death in 1969. He previously served two terms in the State Assembly.

== Biography ==
Sussman was born on May 26, 1905, in Philadelphia, Pennsylvania. He graduated from Milwaukee Public Schools, and attended the Milwaukee School of Engineering for one year.

Sussman worked as a grocer, and as a business representative for the American Federation of State, County and Municipal Employees Local 2, before going to work at the Milwaukee Natatorium, of which he was assistant director when first elected to the Assembly.

Sussman died on April 20, 1969.

== Political career ==
Sussman was a member of the Assembly from 1957 to 1960 and of the Senate from 1961 to 1969. He was a Democrat.

Wisconsin State Assembly
Preceded by Walton Bryan Stewart	Member of the Wisconsin State Assembly from the Milwaukee 2nd district January 7, 1957 – January 2, 1961	Succeeded by Frank G. Dionesopulos
Wisconsin Senate
Preceded by Henry Maier	Member of the Wisconsin Senate from the 9th district January 2, 1961 – April 20, 1969	Succeeded by Ronald G. Parys
