= Monticello, Green County, Wisconsin =

Monticello, Wisconsin
- Village
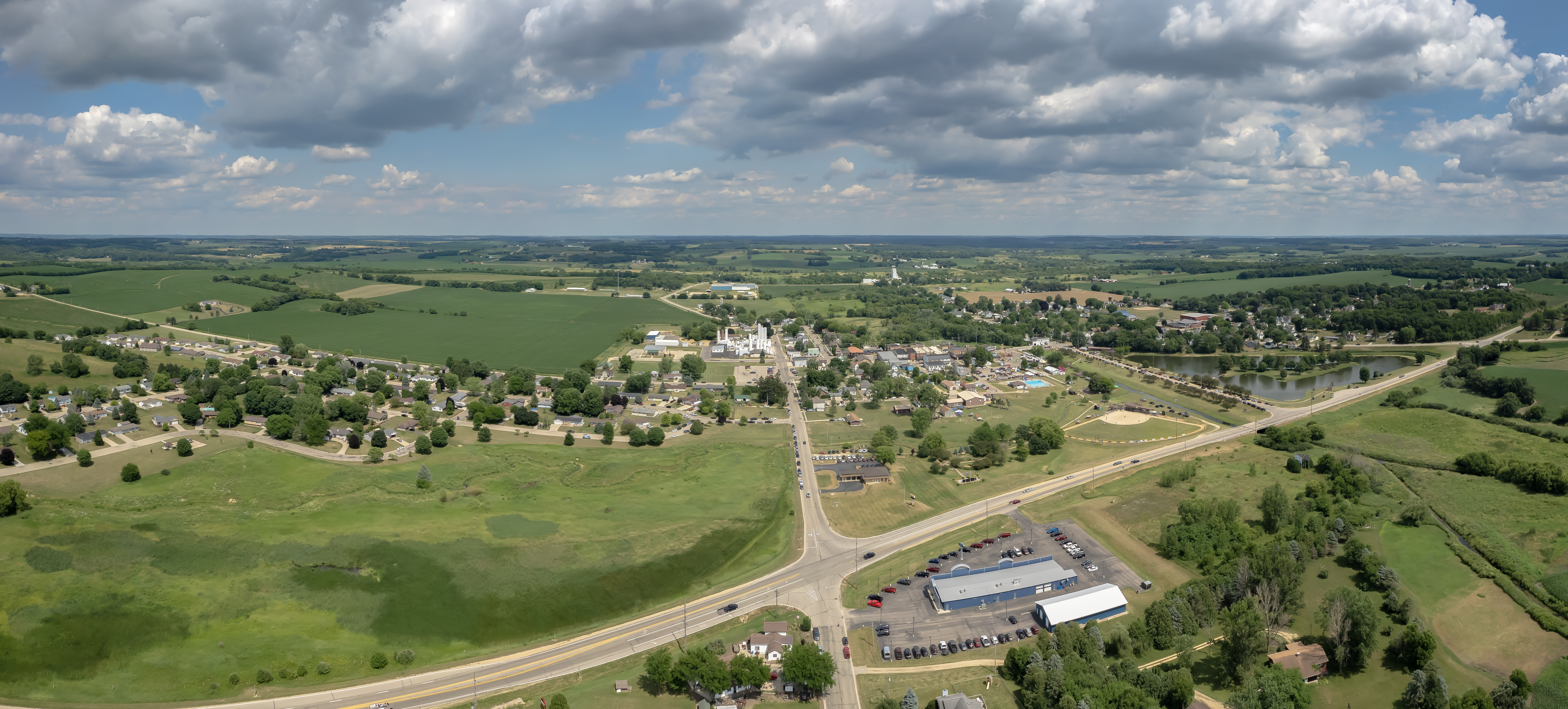
- Historic plaques in Monticello

- Location of Monticello in Green County, Wisconsin.
- Coordinates: 42°44′55″N 89°35′31″W
- Country: United States
- State: Wisconsin
- Counties: Green

Area
  - Total: 1.21 sq mi (3.13 km^{2})
  - Land: 1.19 sq mi (3.09 km^{2})
  - Water: 0.015 sq mi (0.04 km^{2})
- Elevation: 837 ft (255 m)

Population (2020)
  - Total: 1,192
  - Density: 999/sq mi (386/km^{2})
- Time zone: UTC-6 (Central (CST))
  - Summer (DST): UTC-5 (CDT)
- Postal code: 53570
- Area code: 608
- FIPS code: 55-54000
- GNIS feature ID: 1583746
- Website: http://www.monticello-wi.com

Monticello is a village in Green County, Wisconsin, United States. The population was 1,192 as of the 2020 census.

== Geography ==
According to the United States Census Bureau, the village has a total area of 1.18 square miles (3.06 km^{2}), of which 1.17 square miles (3.03 km^{2}) is land and 0.01 square miles (0.03 km^{2}) is water.

== Demographics ==
Historical population
Census	Pop.	Note	%±
1880	156		—
1890	407		160.9%
1900	559		37.3%
1910	671		20.0%
1920	677		0.9%
1930	644		−4.9%
1940	716		11.2%
1950	792		10.6%
1960	789		−0.4%
1970	870		10.3%
1980	1,021		17.4%
1990	1,140		11.7%
2000	1,146		0.5%
2010	1,217		6.2%
2020	1,192		−2.1%
U.S. Decennial Census

=== 2010 census ===
As of the census of 2010, there were 1,217 people, 538 households, and 321 families living in the village. The population density was 1,040.2 inhabitants per square mile (401.6/km^{2}). There were 566 housing units at an average density of 483.8 per square mile (186.8/km^{2}). The racial makeup of the village was 97.5% White, 0.2% African American, 0.1% Native American, 0.8% Asian, 0.6% from other races, and 0.9% from two or more races. Hispanic or Latino of any race were 2.0% of the population.

There were 538 households, of which 32.2% had children under the age of 18 living with them, 46.3% were married couples living together, 8.7% had a female householder with no husband present, 4.6% had a male householder with no wife present, and 40.3% were non-families. 33.1% of all households were made up of individuals, and 11.8% had someone living alone who was 65 years of age or older. The average household size was 2.26 and the average family size was 2.91.

The median age in the village was 39.2 years. 24.8% of residents were under the age of 18; 6.7% were between the ages of 18 and 24; 26.6% were from 25 to 44; 28.5% were from 45 to 64; and 13.4% were 65 years of age or older. The gender makeup of the village was 48.0% male and 52.0% female.

=== 2000 census ===
As of the census of 2000, there were 1,146 people, 498 households, and 310 families living in the village. The population density was 983.7 people per square mile (381.4/km^{2}). There were 517 housing units at an average density of 443.8/sq mi (172.1/km^{2}). The racial makeup of the village was 98.52% White, 0.09% African American, 0.17% Native American, 0.09% Asian, 0.52% from other races, and 0.61% from two or more races. Hispanic or Latino of any race were 1.05% of the population.

There were 498 households, out of which 28.7% had children under the age of 18 living with them, 53.2% were married couples living together, 6.0% had a female householder with no husband present, and 37.6% were non-families. 32.9% of all households were made up of individuals, and 15.1% had someone living alone who was 65 years of age or older. The average household size was 2.30 and the average family size was 2.95.

In the village, the population was spread out, with 24.3% under the age of 18, 7.6% from 18 to 24, 28.1% from 25 to 44, 24.6% from 45 to 64, and 15.4% who were 65 years of age or older. The median age was 39 years. For every 100 females, there were 96.9 males. For every 100 females age 18 and over, there were 93.1 males.

The median income for a household in the village was $44,087, and the median income for a family was $54,464. Males had a median income of $35,921 versus $22,688 for females. The per capita income for the village was $21,772. About 2.7% of families and 5.8% of the population were below the poverty line, including 8.3% of those under age 18 and 6.7% of those age 65 or over.

== Media ==
The Post Messenger Recorder is the area's weekly newspaper.

== Notable people ==
- Orrin Bacon, legislator and miller
- Eugene Clark, legislator
- Ray H. Schoonover, legislator and businessman
- Christ M. Stauffer, legislator.

== Education ==
Monticello High School is the area's high school.
