= Charles J. Schmidt =

American politician and businessman

Charles J. Schmidt (March 20, 1907 – September 8, 1966) was an American politician and businessman. He was a member of the Wisconsin State Assembly and the Wisconsin State Senate.

== Biography ==
Schmidt was born on March 20, 1907, in Milwaukee, Wisconsin. He attended South Division High School and the University of Wisconsin. He worked as an interior decorator and in real estate and insurance. He was also an inspector for the Wisconsin Industrial Commission and for the United States Department of Labor. During World War II, he was a member of the Wisconsin National Guard.

A Roman Catholic, Schmidt was a member of the Knights of Columbus and the Society of the Holy Name. Schmidt was married to Rae Mary Netzhammer. He died of cancer on September 8, 1966.

== Political career ==
From 1949 to 1963, Schmidt served in the Wisconsin State Assembly as a Democrat. In 1962, he was elected to the Wisconsin State Senate from the 5th District. He resigned from the position in 1964 following his election to the Milwaukee Common Council, a position he held until his death from cancer in 1966.
