= Richard C. Nowakowski =

American politician (born 1933)

Richard C. Nowakowski (born September 17, 1933) is an American politician who was a member of the Wisconsin State Assembly.

== Biography ==
Nowakowski was born on September 17, 1933, in Milwaukee. He attended South Division High School before moving on to Marquette University and the University of Miami. Nowakowski is a member of the Polish National Alliance, the Knights of Columbus and is a past Vice President of the Society of the Holy Name.

== Career ==
Nowakowski was a member of the Assembly from 1961 to 1963. He is a Democrat.
