= Eugene S. Kaufman =

American politician from Wisconsin

Eugene S. Kaufman (September 28, 1922 - March 28, 1976) was a former member of the Wisconsin State Assembly.

== Biography ==
Kaufman was born 1922 in Manitowoc, Wisconsin. He would graduate from Lincoln High School. During World War II, Kaufman served in the United States Army. He went on to be a member of the American Legion, Disabled American Veterans and AMVETS, as well as the Society of the Holy Name and the Knights of Columbus.

== Political career ==
Kaufman was elected to the Assembly in 1962, 1964 and 1966. Additionally, he was a member of the Manitowoc County, Wisconsin Board. He is a Democrat.
