= Frank Nikolay =

American politician (1922–2011)

Majority Leader of the Wisconsin State Assembly
- In office January 4, 1965 – January 2, 1967
- Preceded by: Paul Alfonsi
- Succeeded by: J. Curtis McKay

Member of the Wisconsin State Assembly from the Clark County district
- In office January 6, 1969 – January 4, 1971
- Preceded by: William C. Kavanaugh
- Succeeded by: Eugene Oberle
- In office January 5, 1959 – January 2, 1967
- Preceded by: Corwin C. Guell
- Succeeded by: William C. Kavanaugh

Personal details
- Born: September 1, 1922 Day, Wisconsin, U.S.
- Died: December 10, 2011 (aged 89) Abbotsford, Wisconsin, U.S.
- Party: Democratic
- Education: University of Wisconsin–Madison (BS) (LLB)
- Occupation: Attorney, politician

Frank Nikolay (September 1, 1922 – December 10, 2011) was an American politician and lawyer.

Born in Day, Wisconsin, Nikolay served in the Wisconsin National Guard and the United States Navy. He received his bachelor's degree and law degrees from University of Wisconsin–Madison and then practiced law in Abbotsford, Wisconsin. He was the United States Attorney for the Western District of Wisconsin from 1952 to 1953. He served on the Clark County, Wisconsin County Board of Supervisors. He also served in the Wisconsin State Assembly from 1959 to 1965 and 1969 as a Democrat. He died in Abbotsford, Wisconsin.
