= Kenneth E. Priebe =

American politician

Kenneth E. Priebe, Sr. (December 10, 1912 – April 1, 1986) was a member of the Wisconsin State Assembly.

== Biography ==
Priebe was born on December 10, 1912, in Black Creek, Wisconsin. He attended school in Appleton, Wisconsin. He died on April 1, 1986.

== Career ==
Priebe was elected to the Assembly in 1958 and re-elected in 1960. Additionally, he was President of the Appleton City Council. In 1963, Priebe became Chief Clerk of the Assembly. He was a Republican.
