= Gordon Roseleip =

American politician and businessman

Gordon Roseleip (July 30, 1912 – February 27, 1989) was an American, Republican politician and businessman from Wisconsin.

Born in Platteville, Wisconsin, Roseleip was a veteran of World War II and the Korean War and he later participated in a documentary about the resistance movement in Wisconsin. Roseleip was a businessman; he served in the Wisconsin State Senate from 1963 to 1975.

Roseleip was a strong opponent of equal rights for women, and he considered the defeat of a women's rights bill one of his successes. He was defeated in the 1974 election by a feminist and Wisconsin's first woman senator, Kathryn Morrison.

Roseleip is popularly known for his failed defense of a Wisconsin law prohibiting the sale of margarine. He was challenged to a blind taste test between butter and margarine, and he chose margarine as the better of the two. After his death, his family revealed that for years they had been serving him margarine (purchased in Iowa) instead of butter because margarine was believed to be healthier than butter at the time.
