= Lawrence R. Larsen =

20th century American politician

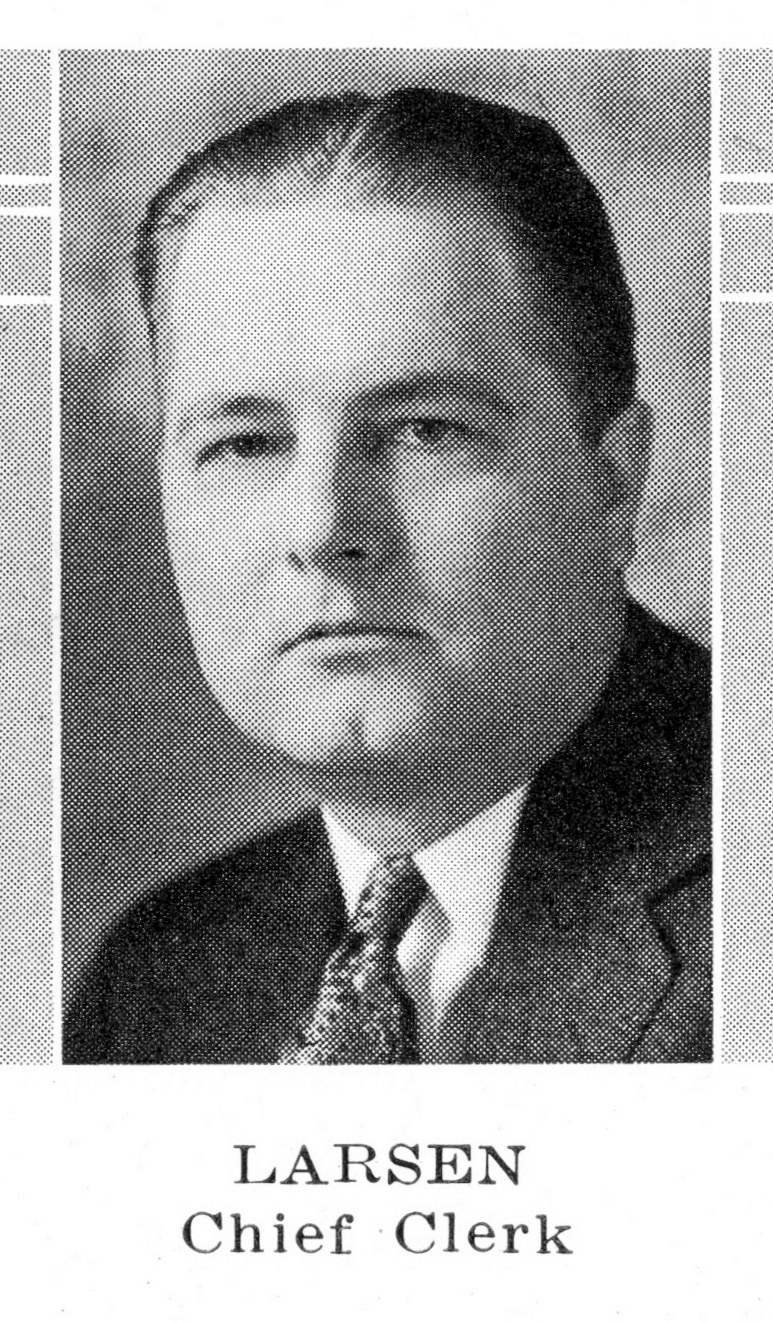

Chief Clerk of the Wisconsin Senate
- In office January 3, 1955 – March 2, 1965 (died)
- Preceded by: Thomas M. Donahue
- Succeeded by: William P. Nugent
- In office January 9, 1935 – January 6, 1947
- Preceded by: Robert A. Cobban
- Succeeded by: Thomas M. Donahue

Member of the Wisconsin State Assembly from the Racine 2nd district
- In office January 1, 1951 – January 3, 1955
- Preceded by: Thomas Cole Taylor
- Succeeded by: Roy E. Naleid

Personal details
- Born: March 23, 1897 Racine, Wisconsin, U.S.
- Died: March 2, 1965 (aged 67) Madison, Wisconsin, U.S.
- Resting place: Mound Cemetery, Racine
- Party: Republican; Democratic (before 1950)
- Spouse: Maude Moriarty (m. 1928–1965)

Military service
- Allegiance: United States
- Branch/service: United States Army
- Rank: Private, USA
- Battles/wars: World War I

Lawrence R. Larsen (March 23, 1897 – March 2, 1965) was a Danish American businessman and politician from Racine, Wisconsin. He served 11 terms as chief clerk of the Wisconsin Senate (1935–1947 & 1955–1965) and also served two terms as a member of the Wisconsin State Assembly (1951–1955).

== Early life and business career ==
Larsen was born to Danish immigrants in Racine, Wisconsin; Racine remained his primary residence for his entire life. He attended public schools and, at age 20, enlisted in the United States Army for service in World War I. He was stationed through most of his service in Shelby, Mississippi. After the war, he became active in the American Legion and Freemasonry. He also became active in the state Retail Merchants' Association through his grocery business and was elected to the board of directors of the retail association in 1921.

== Political career ==
Larsen was originally involved in politics as a member of the Democratic Party. He was chosen as chief clerk of the Wisconsin Senate in the 1935 session, when the Democrats briefly held control of the chamber in a coalition with Wisconsin Progressives. He was subsequently retained as chief clerk when the Progressives took the majority in 1937, and when the Republicans took the majority in 1939, remaining in office until the end of the 1945 session.

He subsequently identified as a member of the Republican Party and was elected to two terms in the Wisconsin State Assembly, representing Racine County's 2nd Assembly district. At the time, his district comprised most of the northern half of the city of Racine. He ran for a third term in 1954 but was defeated by Democrat Roy E. Naleid.

He left office in January 1955, but was immediately re-appointed as chief clerk of the Senate by the Republican majority. He was then re-appointed five more times, serving until his death in March 1965.

On March 2, 1965, Larsen collapsed in his office and was rushed to the University Hospital. He was rushed into surgery for what was described as a ruptured aorta and died at the hospital.

== Personal life and family ==
Lawrence Larsen married Maude Moriarty on August 6, 1928. They had no known children.

Wisconsin State Assembly
Preceded by Thomas Cole Taylor	Member of the Wisconsin State Assembly from the Racine 2nd district January 1, 1951 – January 3, 1955	Succeeded by Roy E. Naleid
Wisconsin Senate
Preceded by Robert A. Cobban	Chief Clerk of the Wisconsin Senate; January 9, 1935 – January 6, 1947	Succeeded by Thomas M. Donahue
Preceded by Thomas M. Donahue	Chief Clerk of the Wisconsin Senate; January 3, 1955 – March 2, 1965 (died)	Succeeded by William P. Nugent
