= Vincent R. Mathews =

American politician

Vincent R. Mathews was a member of the Wisconsin State Assembly.

== Biography ==
Mathews was born on June 8, 1912, in Watertown, Wisconsin. He graduated from Carroll University.

== Career ==
Mathews, a Democrat, was elected to the Assembly in 1958. Previously, he was a Waukesha, Wisconsin, alderman from 1946 to 1950. He also owned an insurance business in Waukesha. He died in Madison, Wisconsin, on April 7, 2005.
