= David D. O'Malley =

American politician

David Donald O'Malley (November 12, 1912 – October 7, 1986) was a member of the Wisconsin State Assembly.

== Biography ==
O'Malley was born on November 12, 1912, in Waunakee, Wisconsin. He attended the University of Wisconsin-Madison and was a member of the Knights of Columbus. He died of a heart attack in 1986.

== Career ==
O'Malley was elected to the Assembly in 1958 and served until 1977. He was succeeded by Thomas A. Loftus. In addition, he was supervisor of Waunakee and a member of the Dane County Board. He was a Democrat.
