= Ben A. Riehle =

20th century American politician

Member of the Wisconsin State Assembly from the Marathon 1st district
- In office January 3, 1955 – November 27, 1967 (died)
- Preceded by: Martin C. Lueck
- Succeeded by: Laurence J. Day

Personal details
- Born: Bunchard Anton Riehle; May 15, 1897 Rietbrock, Wisconsin, U.S.
- Died: November 27, 1967 (aged 70) Rietbrock, Wisconsin, U.S.
- Cause of death: Heart attack
- Resting place: Calvary Cemetery, Athens, Wisconsin
- Party: Democratic
- Spouse: Mildred Jacobitz (m. 1923–1967)
- Children: 11
- Occupation: Dairy farmer

Military service
- Allegiance: United States
- Branch/service: United States Army
- Years of service: 1918–1919
- Battles/wars: World War I

Bernard Anton "Ben" Riehle (born Bunchard Anton Riehle; May 15, 1897 – November 27, 1967) was an American dairy farmer and Democratic politician from Marathon County, Wisconsin. He served 12 years in the Wisconsin State Assembly, representing Marathon County from 1955 until his death in 1967.

== Biography ==
Ben Riehle was born on May 15, 1897, on his family farm in the town of Rietbrock, Marathon County, Wisconsin. He had only an eighth grade education and resided on the same family farm for his entire life. During World War I, he served in the United States Army, in the motor transport service. He died of a heart attack at his farm in Rietbrock, on November 27, 1967.

== Political career ==
Riehle was a member of the state assembly from 1955 until his death in 1967. Previously, he was a member of the Marathon County board of supervisors from 1941 to 1942, and was an unsuccessful candidate for the assembly in 1948.

== Personal life and family ==
Ben Riehle was the only son of five children born to William and Mathilda (née Kulas) Riehle. His mother was a German immigrant, his father was a first generation American, the son of German and Alsatian immigrants. His father established the family farm in Rietbrock in the 1880s and died in a farm accident in 1922.

Ben Riehle married Mildred Jacobitz in 1923. They had four sons and seven daughters together. All but one of their children survived him; his daughter Jean was killed in a traffic collision earlier in 1967.

Wisconsin State Assembly
| Preceded by Martin C. Lueck | Member of the Wisconsin State Assembly from the Marathon 1st district January 3, 1955 – November 27, 1967 | Succeeded by Laurence J. Day |
