= Norman Myhra =

American politician

Norman Lee Myhra (February 17, 1925 – January 16, 2010) was a Wisconsin legislator and businessman.

Born in Amherst, Wisconsin, Myhra served in World War II, losing both his hands in combat in 1944 at the age of 19, and he was in sales and the insurance business. He served in the Wisconsin State Assembly as a Democrat (succeeding fellow Democrat John Kostuck) from 1961 to 1966 from Stevens Point, Wisconsin. He died in Stevens Point.
