= Willis J. Hutnik =

American politician and businessman

Willis Hutnik

Member of the Wisconsin State Assembly
- In office 1954–1970

Personal details
- Born: March 23, 1915 Elk, Wisconsin
- Died: December 13, 1996 (aged 81) Mesa, Arizona
- Party: Republican
- Children: 4
- Education: University of Wisconsin–Madison

Willis J. Hutnik (born March 23, 1915) was an American politician and businessman who served as a member of the Wisconsin State Assembly from 1954 to 1970.

== Early life and education ==
Hutnik was born on March 23, 1915, in Elk, Wisconsin. He attended Phillips High School in Phillips, Wisconsin, Price County Normal School, Central State Teachers College in Ohio, and the University of Wisconsin–Madison.

== Career ==
Hutnik owned a school and office supply business in Tony, Wisconsin, where he worked as a teacher, principal, and real estate broker. Hutnik was elected to the Wisconsin State Assembly in 1952. He was a Republican. Hutnik left office in 1970.

A bill proposing to name a portion of Wisconsin Highway 27 in Rusk County, Wisconsin, and Sawyer County, Wisconsin, the Willis J. Hutnik Memorial Highway was brought before the Wisconsin Legislature in 2012. After his death, Hutnik's papers were donated to the University of Wisconsin–Eau Claire.

== Personal life ==
Hutnik has four children. He died in Mesa, Arizona, on December 13, 1996.
