= Robert P. Knowles =

20th century American politician

President pro tempore of the Wisconsin Senate
- In office January 1967 – January 1975
- Preceded by: Frank E. Panzer
- Succeeded by: Fred Risser

Member of the Wisconsin Senate from the 10th district
- In office April 19, 1955 – January 3, 1977
- Preceded by: Warren P. Knowles
- Succeeded by: Michele Radosevich

Personal details
- Born: February 25, 1916 River Falls, Wisconsin, U.S.
- Died: November 3, 1985 (aged 69) St. Croix County, Wisconsin, U.S.
- Resting place: Immaculate Conception Catholic Cemetery, New Richmond, Wisconsin
- Party: Republican
- Spouse: Madelyne Lucille Armstrong (m. 1941–1985)
- Children: Robert Pierce Knowles II^{(b. 1944; died 1998)}
- Relatives: Warren P. Knowles (brother)

Military service
- Allegiance: United States
- Branch/service: United States Army; Army Air Corps
- Years of service: 1942–1945
- Rank: 1st Lieutenant
- Battles/wars: World War II

Robert Pierce Knowles I (February 25, 1916 – November 3, 1985) was an American businessman and Republican politician. He served 22 years in the Wisconsin State Senate (1955–1977), representing several counties in western Wisconsin. He was the younger brother of Wisconsin Governor Warren P. Knowles (1965–1971).

== Biography ==
Born in River Falls, Wisconsin, Knowles served in the United States Army Air Forces during World War II. He then graduated from the University of Wisconsin–River Falls. He was in the insurance and real estate business. Knowles served in the Wisconsin State Senate from 1955 until 1975; his older brother was Warren P. Knowles, the 37th Governor of Wisconsin. Knowles was defeated for re election in 1976 by Democrat Michele Radosevich 52%-48%.

== Notes ==
Wisconsin Senate
Preceded by Warren P. Knowles	Member of the Wisconsin Senate from the 10th district April 19, 1955 – January 3, 1977	Succeeded by Michele Radosevich
Preceded by Frank E. Panzer	President pro tempore of the Wisconsin Senate; January 1967 – January 1975	Succeeded by Fred Risser
