= Albert R. Tadych =

American politician

Albert R. Tadych was a member of the Wisconsin State Assembly.

== Biography ==
Tadych was born on March 23, 1932, in Milwaukee, Wisconsin. He graduated from Marquette University and from Marquette University Law School. Tadych died on September 1, 2001.

== Career ==
Tadych was elected to the Assembly in 1960, 1962, and 1964. He was a Democrat. He lost the 1966 Democratic primary to Sam Orlich. Tadych lost Democratic primaries in 1970, 1972, 1974, and 1998.
