= Robert Uehling =

American politician

Robert Oscar Uehling (April 23, 1915 – November 29, 2001) was a member of the Wisconsin State Assembly.

== Biography ==
Uehling was born on April 23, 1915, in Wisconsin Rapids, Wisconsin. He attended Santa Monica College and the University of Wisconsin-Madison. During World War II and the Korean War, Uehling served as an officer in the United States Army and the Wisconsin Army National Guard. He died on November 29, 2001, in Madison, Wisconsin.

== Political career ==
Uehling served on the Madison City Council from 1959 to 1961. He was elected to the Assembly in 1960 and was re-elected in 1962 and 1964. Uehling was a Republican.
