= Frank G. Dionesopulos =

American politician

Frank G. Dionesopulos was a former member of the Wisconsin State Assembly.

== Biography ==
Dionesopulos was born on January 10, 1935, in Milwaukee, Wisconsin. He would attend the Spencerian Business College. He died in September 1982.

== Career ==
Dionesopulos was elected to the Assembly in 1960 and 1962. Additionally, he was Coroner of Milwaukee County, Wisconsin, from 1959 to 1960. He was a Democrat.
