= Kyle Kenyon =

20th century American politician

Charles Kyle Kenyon (March 22, 1924 – March 6, 1996) was an American Republican politician.

Born in Wyeville, Wisconsin, to Charles M. Kenyon and Harriet (Shookman) Kenyon, he served in the United States Army Air Forces during World War II. In 1951 he received his law degree from University of Wisconsin Law School and married Xena Cade. He practiced law in Tomah, Wisconsin until shortly before his death. Kenyon served in the Wisconsin State Assembly 1957–1970. Kenyon died in Tomah survived by his wife, Xena, and five children, Charles Kyle Kenyon, Jr., Kathleen Kenyon Harris, Elizabeth Kenyon Hart, John Cass Kenyon, and Helen Annemarie Kenyon.
