= Robert Haase =

20th century American politician

20th & 26th Wisconsin Insurance Commissioner
- In office April 24, 1987 – December 16, 1992
- Appointed by: Tommy Thompson
- Preceded by: Thomas P. Fox
- Succeeded by: John Torgerson (acting)
- In office September 15, 1965 – September 7, 1969
- Appointed by: Warren P. Knowles
- Preceded by: Charles L. Manson
- Succeeded by: Stanley C. Du Rose Jr.

64th Speaker of the Wisconsin State Assembly
- In office January 1963 – January 4, 1965
- Preceded by: David Blanchard
- Succeeded by: Robert T. Huber

Member of the Wisconsin State Assembly
- In office January 4, 1965 – September 15, 1965
- Preceded by: District created
- Succeeded by: Leslie R. Stevenson
- Constituency: Florence–Marinette district
- In office January 7, 1957 – January 4, 1965
- Preceded by: Roy H. Sengstock
- Succeeded by: District abolished
- Constituency: Marinette district

Personal details
- Born: May 10, 1923 Marinette, Wisconsin, U.S.
- Died: September 30, 2009 (aged 86) Mount Rainier, Maryland, U.S.
- Party: Republican
- Spouse: none
- Children: none
- Education: University of Wisconsin Law School
- Profession: Lawyer

Military service
- Allegiance: United States
- Branch/service: United States Army; U.S. Army Air Forces
- Years of service: 1942–1946
- Battles/wars: World War II

Robert D. Haase (May 10, 1923 – September 30, 2009) was an American lawyer and Republican politician from Marinette, Wisconsin. He was the 64th speaker of the Wisconsin State Assembly and served as Wisconsin's 20th and 26th state insurance commissioner during the administrations of governors Warren P. Knowles and Tommy Thompson.

== Biography ==
Born in Marinette, Wisconsin, Haase served in the United States Army Air Forces during World War II. In 1951, Haase received his law degree from the University of Wisconsin Law School. He served on the Marinette School Board and then served in the Wisconsin State Assembly, as a Republican, from 1957 until 1965 when he resigned on September 14, 1965, to become the Wisconsin state insurance commissioner; he served as speaker of the Wisconsin Assembly in the 1963 session. He also served as adjunct professor in the University Law School and University Business School. Haase died in Mount Rainier, Maryland.

Wisconsin State Assembly
Preceded by Roy H. Sengstock	Member of the Wisconsin State Assembly from the Marinette district January 7, 1957 – January 4, 1965	District abolished
District created	Member of the Wisconsin State Assembly from the Florence–Marinette district January 4, 1965 – January 2, 1967	Succeeded by Leslie R. Stevenson
Preceded by David Blanchard	Speaker of the Wisconsin State Assembly; January 1963 – January 4, 1965	Succeeded by Robert T. Huber
Government offices
Preceded by Charles L. Manson	Wisconsin Insurance Commissioner; September 15, 1965 – September 7, 1969	Succeeded by Stanley C. Du Rose Jr.
Preceded by Thomas P. Fox	Wisconsin Insurance Commissioner; April 24, 1987 – December 16, 1992	Succeeded by John Torgerson (acting)
