= Richard J. Zaborski =

American politician

Richard J. Zaborski (January 27, 1927 – January 9, 2001) was an American member of the Wisconsin State Senate.

== Biography ==
Zaborski was born on January 27, 1927, in Milwaukee, Wisconsin. He graduated from Messmer High School before graduating from Marquette University and attending the University of Wisconsin Law School. Zaborski served with the United States Army during World War II and the Korean War. He received the Purple Heart and participated in the Nuremberg Trials. Zaborski was a member of the American Legion and the Society of the Holy Name. He died on January 9, 2001.

== Political career ==
Zaborski was a member of the Senate from 1955 to 1966. He served two terms as the Senate Minority Leader. Previously, he was Chairman of the Milwaukee County, Wisconsin Democratic Party. He was Polish American.
