= Lawrence Johnson (Wisconsin politician) =

20th century American politician

Lawrence H. Johnson (April 26, 1908 – May 1, 1994) was a member of the Wisconsin State Assembly.

== Biography ==
Johnson was born on April 26, 1908, in Nadeau, Michigan. He graduated from high school in Sturgeon Bay, Wisconsin. He died on May 1, 1994.

== Career ==
Johnson was elected to the Assembly in 1960 and was re-elected in 1962 and 1964. Additionally, he was Clerk of Algoma, Wisconsin, and Chairman of the Kewaunee County, Wisconsin Board. He was a Republican.
