= Allen J. Flannigan =

American politician

Allen J. Flannigan was a member of the Wisconsin State Assembly.

== Biography ==
Flanngian was born on June 9, 1909, in Princeton, Indiana. He attended the University of Illinois at Urbana–Champaign and the University of Wisconsin–Madison. During World War II, he served in the United States Army Signal Corps. He worked as a teletype operator, telegram office manager, and then a tool grinder. Flannigan was involved with the United Steelworkers labor union. On February 17, 1965, Flannigan died in Milwaukee, Wisconsin, as a result of a fall on some ice at home.

== Political career ==
Flannigan was first elected to the Assembly in 1956 and was re-elected in 1958, 1960, 1962, and 1964. He was a Democrat.
