= George M. Borg =

American politician

George M. Borg (December 4, 1934 – September 7, 1971) was a Republican member of the Wisconsin State Assembly and the Wisconsin State Senate.

== Background ==
Borg was born in Colorado Springs, Colorado. He was an heir to the Borg-Warner fortune. His grandfather, Swedish immigrant Charles W. Borg (1861–1946), had co-founded Borg-Warner. He moved to Wisconsin in 1935 and attended the University of Wisconsin–Madison. He subsequently served in the United States Army.

== Legislative career ==
Borg became an alderman in Delavan, Wisconsin. He served three terms in the Assembly before challenging three-term incumbent Peter P. Carr for the Republican Senate nomination in 1966 after the district was changed by a redistricting. He unseated Carr in a three-way primary election race, and won the general election in a district of which the Milwaukee Journal said, "Democrats are as scarce as palm trees"; but resigned from the Senate on August 9, 1967. He had been reported as planning to challenge Democrat Lynn E. Stalbaum for his Congress seat; instead, the seat was reclaimed by Henry C. Schadeberg, whom Stalbaum had defeated two years earlier.

== Death ==
Borg died in 1971 as a result of injuries sustained in a motorcycle accident in Lake Geneva, Wisconsin. He had three children Erik, Tamara, and Karl.
