= Norbert Nuttelman =

American politician and farmer

Norbert Nuttelman (March 8, 1911 – June 14, 1986) was an American Republican politician and farmer from Wisconsin.

Born in La Crosse County, Wisconsin, Nuttelman was educated in the public schools in West Salem, Wisconsin. Nuttelman was a farmer and worked with the Farmers Home Administration. He served in the Wisconsin State Assembly 1961–1969. After his career in the Wisconsin Assembly, Nuttelman served on the La Crosse County Board of Supervisors until April 1986, when his health failed him. Has one son name John Nuttelman
