= Raymond J. Tobiasz =

American politician

Member of the Wisconsin State Assembly
- In office January 1, 1973 – January 6, 1975
- Preceded by: District established
- Succeeded by: Kevin Soucie
- Constituency: 7th district
- In office January 2, 1961 – January 1, 1973
- Preceded by: Ervin J. Ryczek
- Succeeded by: District abolished
- Constituency: Milwaukee–11th district

Personal details
- Born: May 10, 1916 Milwaukee, Wisconsin
- Died: March 1, 1976 (aged 59)

Raymond J. Tobiasz (May 10, 1916 – March 1, 1976) was a member and Sergeant at Arms of the Wisconsin State Assembly.

He was born in Milwaukee, Wisconsin and graduated from South Division High School. During World War II, Tobiasz served in the United States Army. He later became a member of AMVETS and the American Legion, as well as the Polish National Alliance and the Knights of Columbus. He died in his 60th year.

== Political career ==
Tobiasz was elected to the Assembly in 1960 and was re-elected in 1962, 1964, 1966, 1968, 1970 and 1972. He became Sergeant at Arms in 1975. Tobiasz was a Democrat.
