= Earl W. Warren =

American politician

Wisconsin State Assembly
- In office 1954–1970

Personal details
- Born: February 25, 1902 Hurley, Wisconsin
- Died: May 3, 1972 (aged 70)
- Party: Democratic
- Profession: Politician

Earl W. Warren (February 25, 1902 – May 3, 1972) was an American politician from Wisconsin. A member of the Democratic Party, Warren served in the State Assembly from 1954 to 1970.

== Early life and career ==
Warren was born on February 25, 1902, in Hurley, Wisconsin. He went on to work at the Young Radiator Company as an assembler.

== Political career ==
From 1948 to 1955, he was a member of the Racine County, Wisconsin Board. In 1954, he was elected to the Wisconsin State Assembly, and left office in 1970.

== Death and legacy ==
Warren died in his home on May 3, 1972, at the age of 70.
