= Walter G. Hollander =

American politician (1896–1990)

Walter Glen Hollander (September 8, 1896 – December 10, 1990) was a member of the Wisconsin State Senate.

== Biography ==
Hollander was born on September 8, 1896, in Fond du Lac County, Wisconsin. He graduated from Omro High School in Omro, Wisconsin. He died on December 10, 1990.

== Career ==
Hollander was first elected to the Senate in 1956 and remained a member until 1976, at which time he was succeeded by future Governor of Wisconsin Scott McCallum. Previously, he was a member of the Board of Fond du Lac County from 1938 to 1966, serving as chairman from 1953 to 1966. He was a Republican.
