= Frank E. Schaeffer Jr. =

American politician

Frank E. Schaeffer (February 1, 1905 – November 3, 1977) was a member of the Wisconsin State Assembly.

== Biography ==
Schaeffer was born on February 1, 1905, in Milwaukee, Wisconsin. He went on to be a painting contractor.

== Political career ==
Schaeffer was first elected to the Assembly in 1944 and remained a member until 1955. He was later elected again in 1958 and stayed in office until 1968. Schaeffer was a Democrat.
