= Angelo F. Greco =

American lawyer and politician

Angelo F. Greco (March 19, 1925 – April 29, 2004) was an American lawyer and politician.

Born in Milwaukee, Wisconsin, he served in the United States Army during World War II. He graduated from Lawrence University and received his law degree from University of Wisconsin Law School. He practiced law in Milwaukee. He served in the Wisconsin State Assembly 1961-1967 as a Democrat. He died in Milwaukee, Wisconsin.
