= Wilfred Schuele =

American politician (1906–1991)

Wilfred Schuele (May 15, 1906 - June 2, 1991) was a member of the Wisconsin State Assembly and Wisconsin State Senate.

== Background ==
Schuele was born on May 15, 1906. His birthplace has been reported to be either Milwaukee, Wisconsin or Hales Corners, Wisconsin, depending on the source. Schuele graduated from Boy's Technical High School and attended Marquette University. He has been listed as being a member of Woodmen of the World and the Fraternal Order of the Eagles.

== Career ==
Schuele was an unsuccessful candidate for the Assembly in 1956 before being elected in 1958. Later, he was a member of the Senate from 1964 to 1975. He was a Democrat.
