= Harry L. Gessert =

American politician

Harry L. Gessert was a member of the Wisconsin State Assembly.

== Biography ==
Gessert was born on July 16, 1901, in Elkhart Lake, Wisconsin. Gessert went to Elkhart Lake School and Plymouth Business College. He went on to operate a restaurant and a retail store. He died on May 19, 1992.

== Political career ==
Gessert was first elected to the Assembly in 1960. Previously, he was elected a justice of the peace in 1955 and a member of the Sheboygan County, Wisconsin Board in 1959. He was a Republican.
