= Reuben La Fave =

American politician

Reuben La Fave (September 27, 1915 – March 12, 1995) was a member of the Wisconsin State Assembly and the Wisconsin State Senate.

== Biography ==
La Fave was born in Oconto, Wisconsin on September 27, 1915. During the World War II era, he served as a chief petty officer in the United States Coast Guard Auxiliary. He died due to complications from a stroke in Portage, Wisconsin on March 12, 1995.

== Career ==
La Fave was a member of the Assembly from 1951 to 1955 and a member of the Senate from 1957 to 1976. He was also a member of the Oconto County, Wisconsin Board. La Fave was a Republican.
