= D. Russell Wartinbee =

American politician and educator

David Russell Wartinbee (November 11, 1903 – March 27, 1977) was an American, Republican politician and educator from Wisconsin.

Born in La Crosse, Wisconsin, Wartinbee received his degree in music from University of Wisconsin–Madison and his masters from University of Minnesota. He also went to what is now University of Wisconsin–La Crosse. He taught music and then history and social problems at La Crosse Central High School. He served in the Wisconsin State Assembly 1961–1967. He died in La Crosse in 1977.
