= Robert Schmidt (American politician) =

American businessman and politician

Robert Schmidt (August 2, 1913 – December 10, 1988) was an American businessman and politician.

Born in Kenosha, Wisconsin, Schmidt went to school in Greenfield, Wisconsin. He studied at West Allis Vocational School (Milwaukee Area Technical College) and political science at Marquette University. He owned a custard stand, liquor store, and was a tool and die maker. He served on the Greenfield Town Board and on the Milwaukee County Board of Supervisors. Schmidt was a Democrat. Schmidt served in the Wisconsin State Assembly from 1961 to 1967. At the time of his death, Schmidt owned a motel. He died of a stroke.
