= Roy E. Naleid =

American politician (1901–1987)

Roy E. Naleid (November 12, 1901 – July 7, 1987) was a member of the Wisconsin State Assembly.

== Biography ==
Naleid was born in Racine, Wisconsin. He attended Marquette University.

== Career ==
Naleid was elected to the Assembly in 1954. Additionally, he was Vice Chairman of the Racine County, Wisconsin Board. He was a Democrat. He died on July 7, 1987.
