= Raymond F. Heinzen =

American politician

Raymond F. Heinzen (1918-2005) was a member of the Wisconsin State Assembly and the Wisconsin State Senate.

== Biography ==
Heinzen was born on May 11, 1918, in Marshfield, Wisconsin. He attended what is now the University of Wisconsin-Madison and was a member of the Knights of Columbus. He died on September 12, 2005, in Arpin, Wisconsin.

== Career ==
Heinzen was elected to the Assembly in 1960 and to the Senate in 1968. He was a Republican.
