= Wayne F. Whittow =

American politician (1933–2025)

Wayne F. Whittow (August 16, 1933 – December 21, 2025) was an American Democratic politician from Milwaukee, Wisconsin. He served 36 years as city treasurer of Milwaukee (1976–2012), and previously served nine years in the Wisconsin Senate (1967–1976) and six years in the State Assembly (1961–1967).

== Background ==
Wayne F. Whittow was born in Milwaukee on August 16, 1933. He graduated from Washington High School in 1951, attended the University of Wisconsin–Milwaukee, and served in the U.S. Army from 1955 to 1957. He then went to work at the AC Spark Plug factory in their engineering administration department.

Whittow held both bachelor's and master's degrees in business administration from University of Wisconsin–Milwaukee. He was a lifelong resident of Milwaukee. Whittow and his wife, Paula, had three sons, as well as six grandchildren. He died on December 21, 2025, at the age of 92.

== Public office ==
In 1960, in his first race for public office at the age of 26 (his brother George was a city alderman), he received the Democratic nomination for Wisconsin State Assembly in Milwaukee County's 16th Assembly by a three-vote margin (1472–1469). He was then elected to the first of three consecutive terms in the Assembly. In 1967, he moved up to the Wisconsin State Senate, representing the 11th Senate District. He was twice re-elected, and eventually served as Senate Majority Leader until being elected Milwaukee City Treasurer in 1976. (He had previously run, unsuccessfully, for City Comptroller in 1968 and for City Treasurer in 1972).
