= Glen Pommerening =

American politician

Glen E. Pommerening (September 12, 1926 – September 10, 2013) was an American lawyer and politician.

Born in Milwaukee, Wisconsin, he received his bachelor's degree and law degrees from University of Wisconsin–Madison. He served in the Wisconsin State Assembly 1954–1966 as a Republican and then was appointed deputy secretary of the Wisconsin Department of Administration by Wisconsin Governor Warren Knowles. In 1970, Pommerening and his family moved to McLean, Virginia where he served in the United States Department of Justice and in the United States Bureau of Prisons. He died in Alexandria, Virginia of lung cancer.
