= Everett E. Bolle =

American politician

Everett E. Bolle (August 29, 1919 – September 7, 1987) was a member of the Wisconsin State Assembly.

He was born in Kossuth, Wisconsin. After graduating from high school in Two Rivers, Wisconsin, Bolle took part in the University of Wisconsin-Extension program. He was a member of the Society of the Holy Name and the Knights of Columbus. He died at age 68.

== Career ==
Bolle was first elected to the Assembly in 1960. He was defeated for re-election in 1974 by Alan Lasee. Additionally, Bolle was Supervisor of Francis Creek, Wisconsin. He was a Democrat.
