= John E. McCormick =

20th century American judge

The Honorable John E. McCormick

Wisconsin Circuit Court Judge for the Milwaukee Circuit, Branch 19
- In office August 1, 1978 – July 31, 2005
- Preceded by: Transitioned from 2nd circ.
- Succeeded by: Dennis R. Cimpl

Wisconsin Circuit Court Judge for the 2nd Circuit, Branch 19
- In office January 1, 1976 – July 31, 1978
- Preceded by: Position established
- Succeeded by: Transitioned to Milwaukee circ.

County Judge for Milwaukee County, Branch 10
- In office July 1972 – January 1, 1976
- Appointed by: Patrick Lucey
- Preceded by: John A. Fiorenza
- Succeeded by: Gary A. Gerlach

Member of the Wisconsin State Assembly from the Milwaukee 17th district
- In office January 1, 1961 – July 1972
- Preceded by: Howard F. Pellant
- Succeeded by: Position abolished

Personal details
- Born: May 20, 1924 Milwaukee, Wisconsin, U.S.
- Died: November 26, 2010 (aged 86) Milwaukee, Wisconsin, U.S.
- Resting place: Calvary Cemetery, Milwaukee
- Party: Democratic
- Spouse: Mary Jo Deppisch
- Children: 9
- Education: Marquette Law School (LL.B.)
- Profession: lawyer, judge

Military service
- Allegiance: United States
- Branch/service: United States Army; Army Air Corps
- Years of service: 1942–1945
- Battles/wars: World War II

John E. McCormick (May 20, 1924 – November 26, 2010) was an American lawyer, jurist, and Democratic politician from Milwaukee, Wisconsin. He served nearly 30 years as a Wisconsin circuit court judge in Milwaukee County, from 1976 to 2005. He previously represented the southeast side of the city of Milwaukee for 11 years in the Wisconsin State Assembly (1961–1972), and served four years as county judge (1972–1976).

== Biography ==
Born in Milwaukee, Wisconsin, McCormick served in the United States Army Air Corps during World War II. He graduated from Marquette University Law School in 1951. He was elected to the Wisconsin State Assembly in 1960 and served six terms until he was appointed County Judge in Milwaukee County in 1972. He was elected to the Wisconsin Circuit Court in Milwaukee County in 1976, and was re-elected every six years until his retirement in 2004. At the time of his death, he was the longest-serving judge in Milwaukee County history.

Judge McCormick was married to Mary Jo Deppisch for 49 years. They had nine children. His wife preceded him in death.

== Electoral history ==
=== Wisconsin Circuit Court (1975, 1981, 1987, 1993, 1999) ===
Wisconsin Circuit Court, 2nd Circuit, Branch 19 Election, 1975
Party	Candidate	Votes	%	±%
General Election, April 1, 1975
Nonpartisan	John E. McCormick	86,583	100.0%	
Total votes		'86,583'	'100.0%'	

Wisconsin Circuit Court, Milwaukee Circuit, Branch 19 Election, 1981
Party	Candidate	Votes	%	±%
General Election, April 7, 1981
Nonpartisan	John E. McCormick (incumbent)	67,398	100.0%	
Total votes		'67,398'	'100.0%'	

Wisconsin Circuit Court, Milwaukee Circuit, Branch 19 Election, 1987
Party	Candidate	Votes	%	±%
General Election, April 7, 1987
Nonpartisan	John E. McCormick (incumbent)	131,073	100.0%	
Total votes		'131,073'	'100.0%'	+94.48%

Wisconsin Circuit Court, Milwaukee Circuit, Branch 19 Election, 1993
Party	Candidate	Votes	%	±%
General Election, April 6, 1993
Nonpartisan	John E. McCormick (incumbent)	99,612	100.0%	
Total votes		'99,612'	'100.0%'	-24.00%

Wisconsin Circuit Court, Milwaukee Circuit, Branch 19 Election, 1999
Party	Candidate	Votes	%	±%
General Election, April 6, 1999
Nonpartisan	John E. McCormick (incumbent)	49,600	55.86%	
Nonpartisan	James Flynn	39,195	44.14%	
Total votes		'88,795'	'100.0%'	-10.86%

Wisconsin State Assembly
Preceded by Howard F. Pellant	Member of the Wisconsin State Assembly from the Milwaukee 17th district 1961–1972	District abolished
Legal offices
Preceded by John A. Fiorenza	County Judge for Milwaukee County, Branch 10; 1972 – 1976	Succeeded by Gary A. Gerlach
New branch established	Wisconsin Circuit Court Judge for the 2nd Circuit, Branch 19; 1976 – 1978	Circuit abolished
New circuit established	Wisconsin Circuit Court Judge for the Milwaukee Circuit, Branch 19; 1978 – 2005	Succeeded by Dennis R. Cimpl
