= Christian M. Stauffer =

American politician

Member of the Wisconsin State Assembly
- In office 1956–1963

Personal details
- Born: May 25, 1896 Monticello, Wisconsin, US
- Died: October 15, 1963 (aged 67) Monroe, Wisconsin, US
- Party: Republican
- Spouse: Ellen Ott Stauffer
- Children: Ruth Stauffer
- Profession: Farmer, Blacksmith, Welder Horseshoer, Politician

Christian "Christ" M. Stauffer (May 25, 1896 – October 15, 1963) was an American Republican member of the Wisconsin State Assembly in the late 1950s and early 1960s.

== Early life and career ==
Stauffer was born in Monticello, Wisconsin, and farmed as a partner with his brother until 1918. He also worked as a blacksmith, welder, and horseshoer. He served in the United States Army during World War I from 1918 to 1919.

== Political career ==
Vice President of the League of Wisconsin Municipalities for three years, Stauffer was active in civic, church, and fraternal organizations. He was fire chief from 1928 to 1948; president of school boards from 1930 to 1943; and the village president from 1935 to 1951. He also served two years each with the selective service board and the county school committee.

Elected to the Wisconsin State Assembly in 1956 and reelected in 1958, 1960 and 1962, Stauffer was Chairman of Assembly Committee on Third Reading; vice-chairman of Commerce and Manufactures Committee, a member of the Agriculture Committee, and served on Interstate Co-operation Committee.

== Death ==
Stauffer served in the Assembly until his death from a stroke in 1963. He was a member of the Reformed German Church of Monticello, Wisconsin. He is buried at Highland Cemetery in Monticello.
