= Floyd E. Shurbert =

American politician

Floyd Eddie Shurbert (October 30, 1900 – October 14, 1985) was a member of the Wisconsin State Assembly.

He was born on October 30, 1900, in Winnebago County, Wisconsin. Following highschool he attended Oshkosh Business College. He later resided in Oshkosh, Wisconsin. He died on October 14, 1985.

== Career ==
Between 1925 and 1954 he was a meat dealer and mink farmer. Shurbert was elected to the Assembly in 1958 and remained a member for at least a decade. Additionally, he was a member of the Winnebago County Board from 1954 to 1958. He was a Republican.
