= Peter P. Carr =

American politician

Peter P. Carr (August 6, 1890 – December 1, 1966) was an American grocer who served three terms as a Republican member of the Wisconsin State Senate from Rock County.

== Background ==
Carr was born in North Jutland County, Denmark on August 6, 1890. He was educated in Chicago public schools and at Chicago Business College. He became involved in the selling of seeds and the grocery business.

== Public office ==
During the Great Depression, Carr was Chairman of the President's Re-Employment Board of Rock County, Wisconsin. Later, he was President of the City Council of Janesville, Wisconsin. After winning a narrow plurality in a four-way Republican primary election which included former Progressive Assemblyman Stanley Slagg, he was elected in 1954 to the 15th (Rock County) Senate district without opposition in the general election, to succeed fellow Republican Robert Robinson, who had died December 26 of the prior year. He was re-elected in 1958 and 1962. In 1966 he lost the Republican nomination to youthful millionaire Assemblyman George M. Borg, coming in a weak third in a three-way race after the district was drastically changed by a redistricting. Borg was successful in the general election, and Carr died a few days later.

== Death and heritage ==
Carr died December 1, 1966. His papers are in the archives of the Wisconsin Historical Society.
