= Reino A. Perala =

American politician

Reino A. Perala (August 28, 1915 – February 25, 2002) was a member of the Wisconsin State Assembly.

He was born in Maple, Wisconsin. Perala was blind and graduated from the Wisconsin Center for the Blind and Visually Impaired before attending the University of Wisconsin–Superior and the University of Wisconsin–Madison.

== Career ==
Perala received his bachelor's degree and law degrees from University of Wisconsin–Madison. He practiced law and owned a hotel in Superior, Wisconsin. He was a justice of the peace. Perala was a member of the Assembly from 1953 to 1968. He was a Democrat.
