= Adams, Adams County, Wisconsin =

Adams, Wisconsin
- Town
- Town of Adams
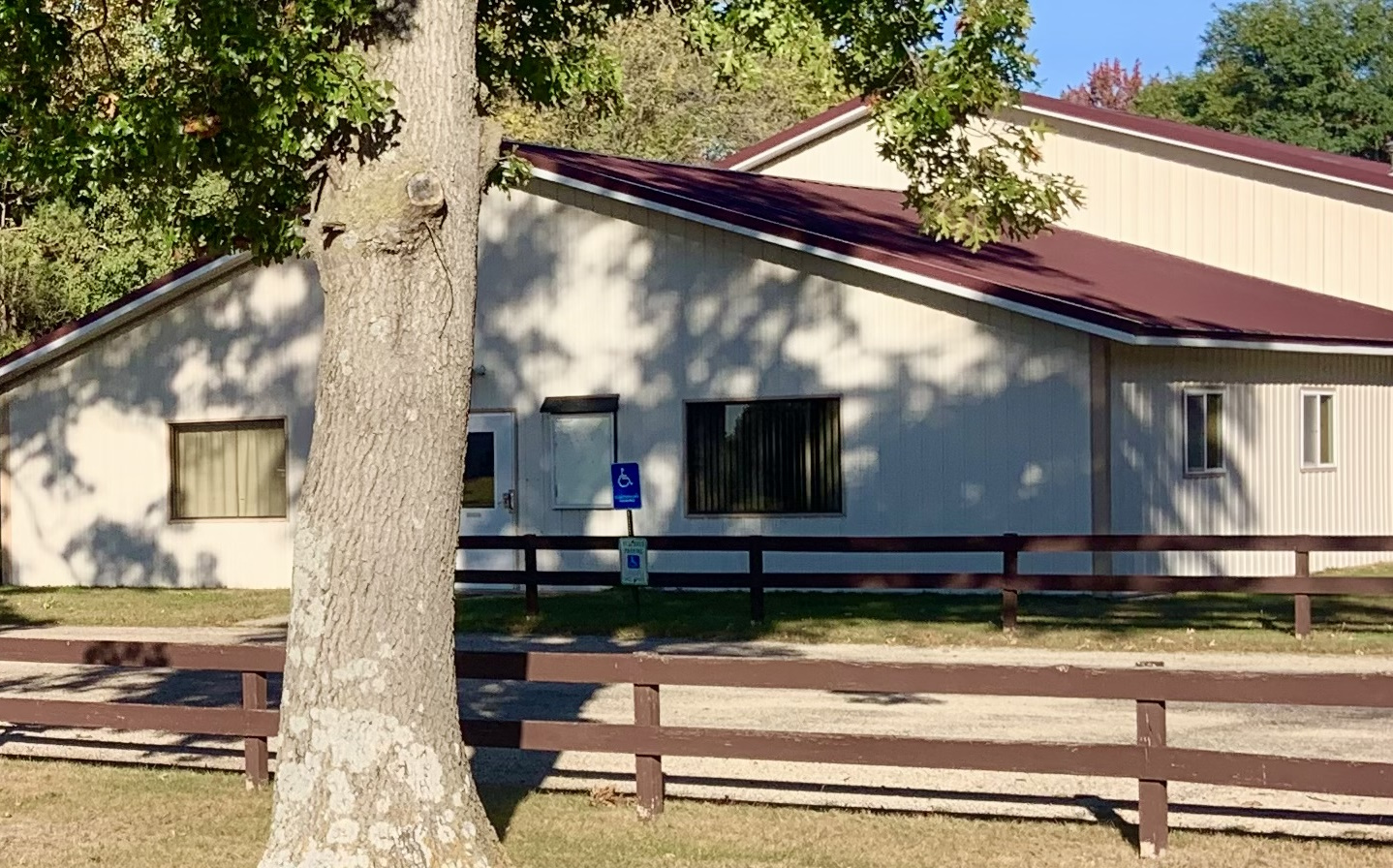
- Town hall

- Location in Adams County and the state of Wisconsin.

- Location within Wisconsin Location within the United States
- Coordinates: 43°56′41″N 89°49′0″W
- Country: United States
- State: Wisconsin
- County: Adams

Area
  - Total: 50.6 sq mi (131.0 km^{2})
  - Land: 50.3 sq mi (130.2 km^{2})
  - Water: 0.31 sq mi (0.8 km^{2})
- Elevation: 971 ft (296 m)

Population (2020)
  - Total: 1,378
  - Density: 27.41/sq mi (10.58/km^{2})
- Time zone: UTC-6 (Central (CST))
  - Summer (DST): UTC-5 (CDT)
- Area code: 608
- FIPS code: 55-00300
- GNIS feature ID: 1582654
- Website: townofadamswi.gov

Adams is a town in Adams County in the U.S. state of Wisconsin. The population was 1,378 at the 2020 census. The city of Adams is located within the town. The ghost town of Adams Center was also located in the town.

== Geography ==
According to the United States Census Bureau, the town has a total area of 50.6 square miles (131.0 km^{2}), of which 50.3 square miles (130.2 km^{2}) is land and 0.31 square miles (0.8 km^{2}), or 0.62%, is water.

== Demographics ==
Historical population
Census	Pop.	Note	%±
1870	425		—
1880	447		5.2%
1890	488		9.2%
1900	588		20.5%
1910	389		−33.8%
1920	442		13.6%
1930	418		−5.4%
1940	447		6.9%
1950	428		−4.3%
1960	497		16.1%
1970	692		39.2%
1980	961		38.9%
1990	1,170		21.7%
2000	1,267		8.3%
2010	1,345		6.2%
2020	1,378		2.5%
U.S. Decennial Census

As of the census of 2000, there were 1,267 people, 547 households, and 363 families residing in the town. The population density was 25.1 people per square mile (9.7 people/km^{2}). There were 856 housing units at an average density of 16.9 units per square mile (6.5 units/km^{2}). The racial makeup of the town was 97.55% White, 0.32% Black or African American, 0.71% Native American, 0.32% Asian, 0.63% from other races, and 0.47% from two or more races. Hispanic or Latino of any race were 1.66% of the population.

There were 547 households, out of which 22.7% had children under the age of 18 living with them, 53.6% were married couples living together, 7.7% had a female householder with no husband present, and 33.6% were non-families. 27.1% of all households were made up of individuals, and 11.9% had someone living alone who was 65 years of age or older. The average household size was 2.32 and the average family size was 2.75.

In the town, the population was spread out, with 21.1% under the age of 18, 7.3% from 18 to 24, 27.0% from 25 to 44, 27.6% from 45 to 64, and 17.0% who were 65 years of age or older. The median age was 42 years. For every 100 females, there were 102.7 males. For every 100 females age 18 and over, there were 101.6 males.

The median income for a household in the town was $34,286, and the median income for a family was $38,482. Males had a median income of $32,171 versus $22,188 for females. The per capita income for the town was $18,225. About 4.9% of families and 9.0% of the population were below the poverty line, including 8.4% of those under age 18 and 14.4% of those age 65 or over.

== Education ==
It is in the Adams-Friendship Area School District.
