= J. Curtis McKay =

American lawyer and politician

J. Curtis McKay (October 10, 1926 – March 23, 1998) was an American Republican lawyer and politician from Wisconsin.

Born in Chicago, Illinois, McKay graduated from Grinnell College and received his law degree from Northwestern University School of Law. He practiced law in Ozaukee County, Wisconsin and served in the Wisconsin State Assembly 1961–1967.
