= 1970 Wisconsin State Assembly election =

- November 3, 1970

All 100 seats in the Wisconsin State Assembly 51 seats needed for a majority

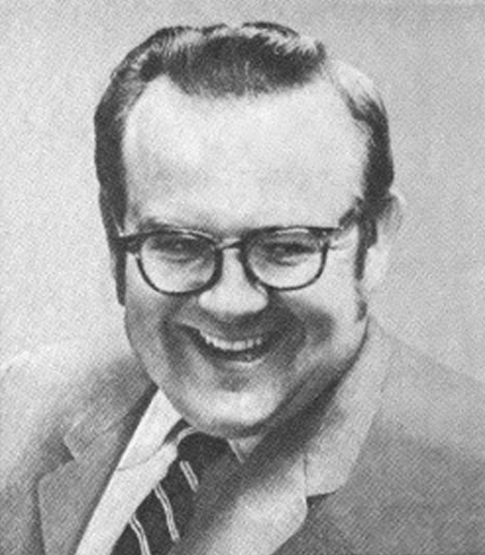
	Majority party	Minority party
Leader	Robert T. Huber	Harold V. Froehlich
Party	Democratic	Republican
Leader since	January 11, 1961	January 2, 1967
Leader's seat	Milwaukee 22nd–West Allis	Outagamie 1st–Appleton
Last election	46 seats, 46.42%	52 seats, 53.10%
Seats before	48	51
Seats won	67	33
Seat change	▲19	▼18
Popular vote	723,187	578,122
Percentage	55.23%	44.15%
Swing	▲8.81%	▼8.95%
	Third party
Party	Independent
Last election	0 seats, 0.49%
Seats before	1
Seats won	0
Seat change	▼1
Popular vote	5,054
Percentage	0.37%
Swing	▼0.12%
- Map of the incumbents: Democratic hold Democratic gain Republican hold
Speaker before election
Harold V. Froehlich
Republican
Elected Speaker
Robert T. Huber
Democratic

The 1970 Wisconsin State Assembly election was held on Tuesday, November 3, 1970. All 100 seats in the Wisconsin State Assembly were up for election. At the time of the election, 51 seats were held by the Republican Party, 48 by the Democratic Party, and one seat by an Independent. Two seats, formerly held by one Republican and one Democrat respectively, were vacant at the time of the election.

These were the final state assembly elections held under the 100 seat legislature, which was reduced to 99 seats as part of the 1970 United States redistricting cycle.

== Results Summary ==
Party	Candidates	Votes		Seats	
Party	Candidates	No.	%	No.	+/−
Democratic Party	100	723,187	55.23	67	+19
Republican Party	100	578,122	44.15	33	−18
Independent	5	4,861	0.37	0	−1
American Party	11	2,728	0.21	0	0
Socialist Workers	1	391	0.03	0	0
Write-in	1	193	0.01	0	0
Total		1,309,482	100.00	100	±0

=== Close races ===
1. Dodge County 1st district, 0.04%
2. Forest–Oneida–Vilas district, 0.28% (gain)
3. Rock County 2nd district, 0.54% (gain)
4. Brown County 2nd district, 1.17%
5. Wood County 2nd district, 1.42% (gain)
6. Manitowoc County 1st district, 1.51%
7. Langlade–Vilas district, 1.60%
8. Dodge County 2nd district, 2.14% (gain)
9. La Crosse County 2nd district, 2.40% (gain)
10. Fond du Lac County 1st district, 3.46%
11. St. Croix County District, 4.10% (gain)
12. Buffalo–Pepin–Pierce District, 4.26% (gain)
13. Dane County 4th district, 4.78% (gain)
14. Wood County 1st district, 4.84% (gain)
15. Kenosha County 2nd district, 5.18% (gain)
16. Washington County district, 5.60%
17. Waukesha County 3rd district, 5.79% (gain)
18. Door–Kewaunee district, 5.96% (gain)
19. Dane County 3rd district, 6.01% (gain)
20. Price–Rusk–Sawyer district, 7.72% (gain)
21. Brown County 1st district, 8.10%

== Outgoing incumbents ==
=== Retiring ===
- Paul Alfonsi (R–Minocqua), representing the Forest–Oneida–Vilas district since 1965, (Note: Represented the Iron–Oneida–Vilas district from 1959–1965 and the Iron–Vilas district from 1933–1941) retired.
- Vincent R. Mathews (D–Waukesha), representing Waukesha County's 3rd district since 1959, retired.
- John C. Van Hollen (R–Chetek), representing the Barron–Washburn district since 1967, retired.
- Earl W. Warren (D–Racine), representing Racine County's 1st district since 1955, retired.

=== Seeking other office ===
- David O. Martin (R–Menasha), representing Winnebago County's 3rd district since 1961, ran for Lieutenant Governor.
- Frank Nikolay (D–Colby), representing the Clark County district since 1969, (Note: Previously elected from 1959–1967)) ran for Lieutenant Governor.
- Bruce Peloquin (D–Chippewa Falls), representing the Chippewa County district since 1965, ran for Wisconsin State Senate.
- Jack D. Steinhilber (R–Oshkosh), representing Winnebago County's 1st district since 1967, ran for Wisconsin State Senate.

=== Vacated ===
- Ronald G. Parys (D–Milwaukee), representing Milwaukee County's 13th district since 1965, vacated his office in October 1969 after being elected to the Wisconsin State Senate.
- Stanley York (R–River Falls) representing the Buffalo–Pepin–Pierce district since 1967, vacated his office in February 1970 after being appointed to an executive office.

=== Lost renomination ===
- Gregor J. Bock (R–Highland), representing the Iowa–Richland district since 1961, lost renomination to Phillip Leyda (R–Richland Center).
- Kyle Kenyon (R–Tomah), representing the Monroe County district since 1957, lost renomination to Robert L. Quackenbush (R–Sparta).
- Oscar A. Laper Jr. (R–Rock Springs), representing the Sauk County district since 1967 lost renomination to Kenyon E. Giese (R–Loganville).

== Race summary ==
District		Incumbent				This race
District		Member	Party	First elected	Status	Candidates
Adams–Juneau–Marquette		Tommy Thompson	Republican	1966	Incumbent re-elected	▌ ✓ Tommy Thompson (Rep.) 65.69%; ▌Justin E. Tarvid (Dem.) 34.31%
Ashland–Bayfield–Iron		Ernest J. Korpela	Democratic	1968	Incumbent re-elected	▌ ✓ Ernest J. Korpela (Dem.) 70.68%; ▌John B. Chapple (Dem.) 29.32%
Barron–Washburn		John C. Van Hollen	Republican	1966	Incumbent retired. New member elected. Republican hold.	▌ ✓ Kenneth M. Schricker (Rep.) 65.88%; ▌George E. Helberg (Dem.) 34.11%
Brown	1	Jerome Quinn	Republican	1954	Incumbent re-elected	▌ ✓ Jerome Quinn (Rep.) 54.05%; ▌Cletus J. Johnson (Dem.) 45.95%
Brown	2	Lawrence J. Kafka	Republican	1964	Incumbent re-elected	▌ ✓ Lawrence J. Kafka (Rep.) 49.91%; ▌James N. DeLorme (Dem.) 48.74%; ▌Donald Lindgren (Amr.) 1.35%
Brown	3	Cletus J. Vanderperren	Democratic	1958	Incumbent re-elected	▌ ✓ Cletus J. Vanderperren (Dem.) 58.06%; ▌Francis E. Petras (Rep.) 40.57%; ▌Kenneth R. Dantoin Sr. (Amr.) 1.37%
Buffalo–Pepin–Pierce		--Vacant (Note: Stanley York (R) resigned February 1, 1970)--			Previous incumbent resigned Feb. 1, 1970. New member elected Democratic gain.	▌ ✓ Michael P. Early (Dem.) 52.13%; ▌Duanne L. Johnson (Rep.) 47.87%
Burnett–Polk		Harvey L. Dueholm	Democratic	1958	Incumbent re-elected	▌ ✓ Harvey L. Dueholm (Dem.) 55.62%; ▌Eugene L. Wycoff (Rep.) 44.38%
Calumet		Gervase Hephner	Democratic	1966	Incumbent re-elected	▌ ✓ Gervase Hephner (Dem.) 67.61%; ▌James Struebing (Rep.) 32.39%
Chippewa		Bruce Peloquin	Democratic	1964	Ran for State Senate. New member elected Democratic hold.	▌ ✓ Terry Willkom (Dem.) 58.83%; ▌Michael D. Stangel (Rep.) 41.17%
Clark		Frank Nikolay	Democratic	1958; 1966 (defeated); 1968	Ran for Lieutenant Governor. New member elected. Democratic hold.	▌ ✓ Eugene Oberle (Dem.) 55.70%; ▌William C. Kavanaugh (Rep.) 44.30%
Columbia		Wesley L. Packard	Republican	1966	Incumbent lost re-election. New member elected. Democratic gain.	▌ ✓ Robert Thompson (Dem.) 57.75%; ▌Wesley L. Packard (Rep.) 42.25%
Crawford–Vernon		Bernard Lewison	Republican	1954	Incumbent re-elected	▌ ✓ Bernard Lewison (Rep.) 56.11%; ▌James O. Peterson (Dem.) 43.89%
Dane	1	Norman C. Anderson	Democratic	1956; 1958 (defeated); 1960	Incumbent re-elected	▌ ✓ Norman C. Anderson (Dem.) 76.53%; ▌Duane Barmore (Rep.) 23.47%
Dane	2	Edward Nager	Democratic	1962	Incumbent re-elected	▌ ✓ Edward Nager (Dem.) 66.04%; ▌Rodney W. Kreunen (Rep.) 31.20%; ▌Patrick M. Quinn (Soc. Wor.) 2.76%
Dane	3	Robert Uehling	Republican	1960	Incumbent lost re-election. New member elected. Democratic gain.	▌ ✓ Midge Miller (Dem.) 52.73%; ▌Robert Uehling (Rep.) 46.72%; ▌Karl E. Koehler (Amr.) 0.55%
Dane	4	Russel R. Weisensel	Republican	1966	Incumbent lost re-election. New member elected. Democratic gain.	▌ ✓ Harland E. Everson (Dem.) 52.39%; ▌Russel R. Weisensel (Rep.) 47.61%
Dane	5	David D. O'Malley	Democratic	1958	Incumbent re-elected	▌ ✓ David D. O'Malley (Dem.) 63.34%; ▌Merton J. Walter (Rep.) 36.66%
Dodge	1	Esther Doughty Luckhardt	Republican	1962	Incumbent re-elected	▌ ✓ Esther Doughty Luckhardt (Rep.) 50.02%; ▌Phillip B. Luce (Dem.) 49.98%
Dodge	2	Elmer C. Nitschke	Republican	1948	Incumbent lost re-election. New member elected. Democratic gain.	▌ ✓ Thomas S. Hanson (Dem.) 51.07%; ▌Elmer C. Nitschke (Rep.) 48.93%
Door–Kewaunee		Lawrence Johnson	Republican	1960	Incumbent lost re-election. New member elected. Democratic gain.	▌ ✓ Lary J. Swoboda (Dem.) 52.98%; ▌Lawrence Johnson (Rep.) 47.02%
Douglas		Edward Stack	Democratic	1968	Incumbent re-elected	▌ ✓ Edward Stack (Dem.) 61.73%; ▌John R. Shepard (Rep.) 38.27%
Dunn		Alvin Baldus	Democratic	1966	Incumbent re-elected	▌ ✓ Alvin Baldus (Dem.) 64.64%; ▌John R. Shepard (Rep.) 35.36%
Eau Claire	1	Joseph Looby	Democratic	1968	Incumbent re-elected	▌ ✓ Joseph Looby (Dem.) 61.32%; ▌Gerald O. Amundson (Rep.) 38.68%
Eau Claire	2	Louis V. Mato	Democratic	1962	Incumbent re-elected	▌ ✓ Louis V. Mato (Dem.) 69.76%; ▌Gerald L. Wold (Rep.) 30.24%
Florence–Marinette		William LaFave	Republican	1968	Incumbent re-elected	▌ ✓ William LaFave (Rep.) 62.84%; ▌William H. Reines (Dem.) 37.16%
Fond du Lac	1	Earl F. McEssy	Republican	1956	Incumbent re-elected	▌ ✓ Earl F. McEssy (Rep.) 51.73%; ▌John A. Race (Dem.) 48.27%
Fond du Lac	2	William S. Schwefel	Republican	1964	Incumbent re-elected	▌ ✓ William S. Schwefel (Rep.) 65.07%; ▌Michael Thompson (Dem.) 34.93%
Forest–Oneida–Vilas		Paul Alfonsi	Republican	1932; 1940 (retired); 1958	Incumbent retired. New member elected. Democratic gain.	▌ ✓ Ellsworth Gaulke (Dem.) 50.14%; ▌Dennis F. Hastreiter (Rep.) 49.86%
Grant		James N. Azim Jr.	Republican	1964 (special)	Incumbent re-elected	▌ ✓ James N. Azim Jr. (Rep.) 67.45%; ▌Lloyd V. Grimes (Dem.) 32.55%
Green–Lafayette		Joseph E. Tregoning	Republican	1967 (special)	Incumbent re-elected	▌ ✓ Joseph E. Tregoning (Rep.) 67.52%; ▌Kenneth E. Nyland (Dem.) 32.48%
Green Lake–Waushara		Jon P. Wilcox	Republican	1968	Incumbent re-elected	▌ ✓ Jon P. Wilcox (Rep.) 69.77%; ▌James E. Schommer (Dem.) 30.23%
Iowa–Richland		Gregor J. Bock	Republican	1960	Incumbent lost renomination. New member elected. Democratic gain.	▌ ✓ Joanne M. Duren (Dem.) 57.05%; ▌Philip Leyda (Rep.) 42.95%
Jackson–Trempealeau		John Q. Radcliffe	Democratic	1964	Incumbent re-elected	▌ ✓ John Q. Radcliffe (Dem.) 70.20%; ▌Richard W. Ellingson (Rep.) 29.08%; ▌Marion C. Michaels (Rep.) 0.72%
Jefferson		Byron F. Wackett	Republican	1952	Incumbent re-elected	▌ ✓ Byron F. Wackett (Rep.) 56.32%; ▌Delos J. Seitz (Dem.) 43.68%
Kenosha	1	George Molinaro	Democratic	1946	Incumbent re-elected	▌ ✓ George Molinaro (Dem.) 79.54%; ▌William L. McCartin (Rep.) 20.46%
Kenosha	2	Russell Olson	Republican	1960; 1964 (defeated); 1966	Incumbent lost re-election. New member elected. Democratic gain.	▌ ✓ Eugene Dorff (Dem.) 52.59%; ▌Russell Olson (Rep.) 47.41%
La Crosse	1	Gerald Greider	Republican	1968	Incumbent re-elected	▌ ✓ Gerald Greider (Rep.) 56.96%; ▌Nelson L. Miller (Dem.) 43.04%
La Crosse	2	Norbert Nuttelman	Republican	1960	Incumbent lost re-election. New member elected. Democratic gain.	▌ ✓ Virgil Roberts (Dem.) 51.20%; ▌Norbert Nuttelman (Rep.) 48.80%
Langlade–Oconto		Milton McDougal	Republican	1964 (Note: First elected as a Democrat)	Incumbent re-elected	▌ ✓ Milton McDougal (Rep.) 50.80%; ▌Nelson L. Miller (Dem.) 49.20%
Lincoln–Taylor		Joseph Sweda	Democratic	1962	Incumbent re-elected	▌ ✓ Joseph Sweda (Dem.) 63.21%; ▌Carl S. Wallace (Rep.) 36.79%
Manitowoc	1	Donald K. Helgeson	Republican	1968	Incumbent re-elected	▌ ✓ Donald K. Helgeson (Rep.) 47.57%; ▌Eugene S. Kaufman (Dem.) 46.06%; ▌Marvin Holschbach (Amr.) 6.37%
Manitowoc	2	Everett E. Bolle	Democratic	1960	Incumbent re-elected	▌ ✓ Everett E. Bolle (Dem.) 62.69%; ▌Harold I. Kabat (Rep.) 35.15%; ▌Stanley C. Henschel (Amr.) 2.16%
Marathon	1	Laurence J. Day	Democratic	1968	Incumbent re-elected	▌ ✓ Laurence J. Day (Dem.) 70.81%; ▌Ernest L. Wiley (Rep.) 28.07%; ▌Thomas Stockheimer (Amr.) 1.12%
Marathon	2	Tony Earl	Democratic	1969 (special)	Incumbent re-elected	▌ ✓ Tony Earl (Dem.) 70.85%; ▌Thomas L. Miler (Rep.) 29.15%
Menominee–Shawano		Herbert J. Grover	Democratic	1964	Incumbent re-elected	▌ ✓ Herbert J. Grover (Dem.) 72.43%; ▌William H. Cantwell (Rep.) 27.57%
Milwaukee	1	Mark Lipscomb Jr.	Democratic	1964	Incumbent re-elected	▌ ✓ Mark Lipscomb Jr. (Dem.) 82.55%; ▌Derrel Wilkerson (Rep.) 13.63%; ▌Justus A. Stovall (Rep.) 3.82%
Milwaukee	2	Joseph E. Jones	Democratic	1962	Incumbent re-elected	▌ ✓ Joseph E. Jones (Dem.) 77.59%; ▌Rosella Morrice (Rep.) 22.41%
Milwaukee	3	Dennis Conta	Democratic	1968	Incumbent re-elected	▌ ✓ Dennis Conta (Dem.) 61.68%; ▌Stephen C. Birringer (Rep.) 37.92%; ▌James Eyman (Ind.) 0.22%; ▌Peter A. Manti (Ind.) 0.18%
Milwaukee	4	Harout O. Sanasarian	Democratic	1968	Incumbent re-elected	▌ ✓ Harout O. Sanasarian (Dem.) 72.97%; ▌John L. Maier (Rep.) 27.03%
Milwaukee	5	Paul Sicula	Democratic	1966	Incumbent re-elected	▌ ✓ Paul Sicula (Dem.) 69.75%; ▌Paul J. Utschig (Rep.) 30.25%
Milwaukee	6	Lloyd Barbee	Democratic	1964	Incumbent re-elected	▌ ✓ Lloyd Barbee (Dem.) 87.86%; ▌Elias Morales (Rep.) 12.14%
Milwaukee	7	William A. Johnson	Democratic	1965 (special)	Incumbent re-elected	▌ ✓ William A. Johnson (Dem.) 81.80%; ▌James LeRoy (Rep.) 18.20%
Milwaukee	8	Joseph Czerwinski	Democratic	1968	Incumbent re-elected	▌ ✓ Joseph Czerwinski (Dem.) 81.49%; ▌James Andreska (Rep.) 15.07%; ▌Eugene R. Schmitt (Amr.) 3.44%
Milwaukee	9	Robert L. Jackson Jr.	Democratic	1968	Incumbent re-elected	▌ ✓ Robert L. Jackson Jr. (Dem.) 62.26%; ▌Robert Kasten (Rep.) 37.74%
Milwaukee	10	Fred Kessler	Democratic	1960; 1962 (retired); 1964	Incumbent re-elected	▌ ✓ Fred Kessler (Dem.) 77.48%; ▌Paul E. Chovanec (Rep.) 22.52%
Milwaukee	11	Raymond J. Tobiasz	Democratic	1960	Incumbent re-elected	▌ ✓ Raymond J. Tobiasz (Dem.) 80.21%; ▌Merle A. Seibt (Rep.) 19.79%
Milwaukee	12	Sam L. Orlich	Democratic	1966	Incumbent re-elected	▌ ✓ Sam L. Orlich (Dem.) 83.82%; ▌Alfred E. Boyd (Rep.) 11.34%; ▌Dante Navarro (write-in) 3.07%; ▌Leonard W. Galbrecht (Amr.) 1.77%
Milwaukee	13	--Vacant (Note: Ronald G. Parys (D) resigned on October 14, 1969)--			District vacated. New member elected Democratic hold.	▌ ✓ Glenn E. Bultman (Dem.) 75.89%; ▌Millie Morries (Rep.) 24.11%
Milwaukee	14	Jerry Kleczka	Democratic	1968	Incumbent re-elected	▌ ✓ Jerry Kleczka (Dem.) 84.78%; ▌Leonard A. Fons (Rep.) 14.08%; ▌Paul A. Schmelter (Amr.) 1.14%
Milwaukee	15	Erwin G. Tamms	Republican	1968	Incumbent lost re-election. New member elected. Democratic gain.	▌ ✓ James W. Wahner (Dem.) 71.48%; ▌Erwin G. Tamms (Rep.) 28.52%
Milwaukee	16	Richard E. Pabst	Democratic	1966	Incumbent re-elected	▌ ✓ Richard E. Pabst (Dem.) 69.78%; ▌Carol Story Kopecky (Rep.) 29.48%; ▌Paul A. Schmelter (Amr.) 0.74%
Milwaukee	17	John E. McCormick	Democratic	1960	Incumbent re-elected	▌ ✓ John E. McCormick (Dem.) 77.41%; ▌Patricia Jo Rasch (Rep.) 22.59%
Milwaukee	18	Ervin Schneeberg	Republican	1968	Incumbent lost re-election. New member elected. Democratic gain.	▌ ✓ David Berger (Dem.) 59.87%; ▌Ervin Schneeberg (Rep.) 39.50%; ▌Richard J. Regan (Ind.) 0.63%
Milwaukee	19	Daniel D. Hanna	Democratic	1964	Incumbent re-elected	▌ ✓ Daniel D. Hanna (Dem.) 65.39%; ▌Stephen W. Baer (Rep.) 34.61%
Milwaukee	20	George Klicka	Republican	1966	Incumbent re-elected	▌ ✓ George Klicka (Rep.) 59.27%; ▌William D. Bauman (Dem.) 40.73%
Milwaukee	21	James J. Lynn	Democratic	1968	Incumbent re-elected	▌ ✓ James J. Lynn (Dem.) 58.64%; ▌Robert L. Dohnal (Rep.) 41.36%
Milwaukee	22	Robert T. Huber	Democratic	1948	Incumbent re-elected	▌ ✓ Robert T. Huber (Dem.) 76.80%; ▌Gary L. Biwersi (Rep.) 23.20%
Milwaukee	23	Jerry J. Wing	Independent	1968 (Note: First elected as a Republican)	Incumbent lost re-election. New member elected. Democratic gain.	▌ ✓ James A. Rutkowski (Dem.) 52.04%; ▌Jerry J. Wing (Ind) 24.19%; ▌Thomas H. Graf (Rep.) 23.77%
Milwaukee	24	William P. Atkinson	Democratic	1964	Incumbent re-elected	▌ ✓ William P. Atkinson (Dem.) 69.41%; ▌Peter Boyajian (Rep.) 30.59%
Milwaukee	25	Jim Sensenbrenner	Republican	1968	Incumbent re-elected	▌ ✓ F. James Sensenbrenner Jr. (Rep.) 70.23%; ▌Margaret Rounseville (Dem.) 29.77%
Monroe		Kyle Kenyon	Republican	1956	Incumbent lost renomination. New member elected. Republican hold.	▌ ✓ Robert Quackenbush (Rep.) 70.23%; ▌Dennis W. Hamilton (Dem.) 29.77%
Outagamie	1	Harold V. Froehlich	Republican	1962	Incumbent re-elected	▌ ✓ Harold V. Froehlich (Rep.) 57.43%; ▌Glenn W. Thompson (Dem.) 42.57%
Outagamie	2	William J. Rogers	Democratic	1962	Incumbent re-elected	▌ ✓ William J. Rogers (Dem.) 76.33%; ▌Russel H. Dix (Rep.) 23.67%
Outagamie	3	Ervin Conradt	Republican	1964	Incumbent re-elected	▌ ✓ Ervin Conradt (Rep.) 66.17%; ▌John A. Bowers (Dem.) 33.83%
Ozaukee		Herbert Schowalter	Republican	1968	Incumbent re-elected	▌ ✓ Herbert Schowalter (Rep.) 66.25%; ▌Michael J. Weber Jr. (Dem.) 33.75%
Portage		Leonard A. Groshek	Democratic	1968	Incumbent re-elected	▌ ✓ Leonard A. Groshek (Dem.) 57.75%; ▌Nancy P. Brown (Rep.) 42.25%
Price–Rusk–Sawyer		Willis J. Hutnik	Republican	1954	Incumbent lost re-election. New member elected. Democratic gain.	▌ ✓ John W. Slaby (Dem.) 53.86%; ▌Willis J. Hutnik (Rep.) 46.14%
Racine	1	Earl W. Warren	Democratic	1954	Incumbent retired. New member elected. Democratic hold.	▌ ✓ R. Michael Ferrall (Dem.) 55.71%; ▌William K. Kirt (Rep.) 44.29%
Racine	2	Manny S. Brown	Democratic	1964	Incumbent re-elected	▌ ✓ Manny S. Brown (Dem.) 54.92%; ▌Thomas Mortenson (Rep.) 45.08%
Racine	3	Merrill E. Stalbaum	Republican	1960	Incumbent re-elected	▌ ✓ Merrill E. Stalbaum (Rep.) 57.21%; ▌George H. Iverson (Dem.) 42.79%
Rock	1	Lewis T. Mittness	Democratic	1964	Incumbent re-elected	▌ ✓ Lewis T. Mittness (Dem.) 65.00%; ▌Bernard R. Losching (Rep.) 35.00%
Rock	2	Carolyn Blanchard	Republican	1963 (special)	Incumbent lost re-election. New member elected. Democratic gain.	▌ ✓ Janet Soergel Mielke (Dem.) 50.27%; ▌Carolyn Blanchard (Rep.) 49.73%
Rock	3	George B. Belting	Republican	1956	Incumbent lost re-election. New member elected. Democratic gain.	▌ ✓ Gary K. Johnson (Dem.) 57.79%; ▌George B. Belting (Rep.) 42.21%
Sauk		Oscar A. Laper Jr.	Republican	1966	Incumbent lost renomination. New member elected Republican hold.	▌ ✓ Kenyon E. Giese (Rep.) 57.21%; ▌John R. Gasser (Dem.) 42.79%
Sheboygan	1	Carl Otte	Democratic	1966	Incumbent re-elected	▌ ✓ Carl Otte (Dem.) 66.98%; ▌Karl Keil (Rep.) 33.02%
Sheboygan	2	Vernon R. Boeckmann	Democratic	1968	Incumbent re-elected	▌ ✓ Vernon R. Boeckmann (Dem.) 59.97%; ▌Ted C. Block (Rep.) 40.03%
St. Croix		Robert M. Boche	Republican	1966	Incumbent lost re-election. New member elected. Democratic gain.	▌ ✓ Leo Mohn (Dem.) 52.05%; ▌Robert M. Boche (Rep.) 47.95%
Walworth		Clarence J. Wilger	Republican	1966	Incumbent re-elected	▌ ✓ Clarence J. Wilger (Rep.) 59.67%; ▌Eleanora M. Wickstrom (Dem.) 40.33%
Washington		Frederick C. Schroeder	Republican	1964	Incumbent re-elected	▌ ✓ Frederick C. Schroeder (Rep.) 52.80%; ▌Lehman Eichstedt Jr. (Dem.) 47.20%
Waukesha	1	Kenneth Merkel	Republican	1964	Incumbent re-elected	▌ ✓ Kenneth Merkel (Rep.) 63.07%; ▌Harvey F. Jaeger (Dem.) 36.93%
Waukesha	2	John M. Alberts	Republican	1968	Incumbent re-elected	▌ ✓ John M. Alberts (Rep.) 60.31%; ▌Gerald J. Bagin (Dem.) 39.69%
Waukesha	3	Vincent R. Mathews	Democratic	1958	Incumbent retired. New member elected. Democratic hold.	▌ ✓ Edward Jackamonis (Dem.) 52.11%; ▌Rudolph V. Schoenecker (Rep.) 46.32%; ▌Thomas Eaton Jr. (Amr.) 1.56%
Waukesha	4	John C. Shabaz	Republican	1964	Incumbent re-elected	▌ ✓ John C. Shabaz (Rep.) 56.76%; ▌Philip A. Birdener (Dem.) 43.24%
Waupaca		Francis R. Byers	Republican	1968	Incumbent re-elected	▌ ✓ Francis R. Byers (Rep.) 68.53%; ▌Harold W. Routheaux (Dem.) 31.47%
Winnebago	1	Jack D. Steinhilber	Republican	1966	Ran for State Senate. New member elected Republican hold.	▌ ✓ Jon R. Guiles (Rep.) 55.81%; ▌James Manske (Dem.) 44.19%
Winnebago	2	Gordon R. Bradley	Republican	1966	Incumbent re-elected	▌ ✓ Gordon R. Bradley (Rep.) 60.43%; ▌Harry Lopas (Dem.) 39.57%
Winnebago	3	David O. Martin	Republican	1960	Incumbent ran for Lieutenant Governor. New member elected. Republican hold.	▌ ✓ Michael Ellis (Rep.) 61.79%; ▌Kenneth Walstrom (Dem.) 38.21%
Wood	1	John Parkin	Republican	1968	Incumbent lost re-election. New member elected. Democratic gain.	▌ ✓ John Oestreicher (Dem.) 52.42%; ▌John Parkin (Rep.) 47.58%
Wood	2	Harvey F. Gee	Republican	1960	Incumbent lost re-election. New member elected. Democratic gain.	▌ ✓ Marlin Schneider (Dem.) 50.71%; ▌Harvey F. Gee (Rep.) 49.29%
