= 79th Wisconsin Legislature =

Wisconsin legislative term for 1969–1970

←	78th	80th	→
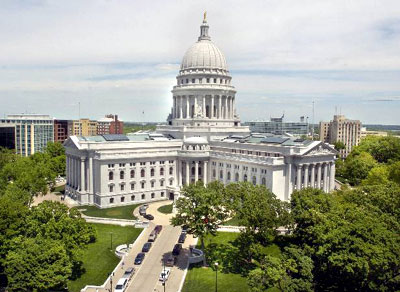
- Wisconsin State Capitol

Overview
- Legislative body: Wisconsin Legislature
- Meeting place: Wisconsin State Capitol
- Term: January 6, 1969 – January 4, 1971
- Election: November 5, 1968

Senate
- Members: 33
- Senate President: Jack B. Olson (R)
- President pro tempore: Robert P. Knowles (R)
- Party control: Republican

Assembly
- Members: 100
- Assembly Speaker: Harold V. Froehlich (R)
- Speaker pro tempore: Elmer C. Nitschke (R)
- Party control: Republican

Sessions
- Regular: January 6, 1969 – January 4, 1971

Special sessions
- Sep. 1969 Spec.: September 29, 1969 – January 17, 1970
- Dec. 1970 Spec.: December 22, 1970 – December 22, 1970

The Seventy-Ninth Wisconsin Legislature convened from January 6, 1969, to January 4, 1971, in regular session and also convened in two special sessions in the fall of 1969 and on December 22, 1970.

Senators representing even-numbered districts were newly elected for this session and were serving the first two years of a four-year term. Assembly members were elected to a two-year term. Assembly members and even-numbered senators were elected in the general election of November 5, 1968. Senators representing odd-numbered districts were serving the third and fourth year of a four-year term, having been elected in the general election of November 8, 1966.

The governor of Wisconsin during this entire term was Republican Warren P. Knowles, of St. Croix County, serving his third two-year term, having won re-election in the 1968 Wisconsin gubernatorial election.

== Major events ==
- January 6, 1969: Third inauguration of Warren P. Knowles as Governor of Wisconsin.
- January 20, 1969: Inauguration of Richard Nixon as the 37th President of the United States.
- January 21, 1969: Wisconsin U.S. representative Melvin Laird (WI-07) resigned from Congress to become United States Secretary of Defense.
- April 1, 1969: 1969 Wisconsin spring election:
  - Voters ratified two amendments to the state constitution:
    - Allowing the legislature to establish the office of county executive for all counties (it had previously been restricted to Milwaukee County).
    - Allowing the state to take on debt directly and end the practice of utilizing dummy corporations.
- July 20, 1969: As part of the Apollo 11 mission, American astronauts Neil Armstrong and Buzz Aldrin became the first humans to set foot on the Moon.
- October 29, 1969: The first message was sent over ARPANET, the forerunner of the internet.
- March 31, 1970: The Seattle Pilots professional baseball team was sold to a new ownership group led by Bud Selig, who immediately moved the franchise to Milwaukee and renamed them the Milwaukee Brewers.
- April 17, 1970: The Apollo 13 crew returned safely to Earth after suffering a catastrophic explosion on their spacecraft four days earlier.
- April 22, 1970: The first Earth Day was celebrated, organized by Wisconsin's junior United States senator, Gaylord Nelson.
- August 24, 1970: The Sterling Hall bombing on the University of Wisconsin–Madison campus killed a physics professor and injured three others.
- November 3, 1970: 1970 United States general election:
  - Patrick Lucey (D) elected Governor of Wisconsin.
  - William Proxmire (D) re-elected United States senator from Wisconsin.
- November 18, 1970: A three-judge panel of the United States District Court for the Eastern District of Wisconsin ruled in the case of Babbitz v. McCann, granting an injunction which prohibited enforcement of Wisconsin's laws against abortion, effectively making abortion legal in Wisconsin.

== Major legislation ==
- 1969 Joint Resolution 2: Second legislative passage of a proposed amendment to the state constitution to allow the legislature to establish the office of county executive for all Wisconsin counties. This amendment was ratified by voters at the April 1969 election.
- 1969 Joint Resolution 3: Second legislative passage of a proposed amendment to the state constitution to allow the state to take on debt without utilizing a shell corporation. This amendment was ratified by voters at the April 1969 election.

== Party summary ==
=== Senate summary ===
Senate partisan composition Democratic: 11 seats Vacant: 1 seat Republican: 21 seats

	Party (Shading indicates majority caucus)		Total	
	Dem.	Rep.	Total	Vacant
End of previous Legislature	12	21	33	0
Start of Reg. Session	10	23	33	0
From Apr. 20, 1969 (Note: Democrat Norman Sussman (9th District) died.)	9	23	32	1
From Aug. 26, 1969 (Note: Republican Frank E. Panzer (13th District) died.)	9	22	31	2
From Oct. 4, 1969 (Note: Republican Chester Dempsey (33rd District) died.)	9	21	30	3
From Oct. 14, 1969 (Note: Democrat Ronald G. Parys (9th District) was sworn in to replace Norman Sussman.)	10	21	31	2
From Nov. 11, 1969 (Note: Democrat Dale McKenna (13th District) was sworn in to replace Frank E. Panzer.)	11	21	32	1
Final voting share	34.38%	65.63%		
Beginning of the next Legislature	12	20	32	1

=== Assembly summary ===
Assembly partisan composition Democratic: 48 seats Independent: 1 seat Republican: 51 seats

	Party (Shading indicates majority caucus)			Total	
	Dem.	Ind.	Rep.	Total	Vacant
End of previous Legislature	46	0	52	98	2
Start of Reg. Session	48	0	52	100	0
From Apr. 1, 1969 (Note: Democrat Dave Obey (Marathon County) resigned after being elected to the U.S. House of Representatives.)	47	0	52	99	1
From Oct. 2, 1969 (Note: Republican Jerry J. Wing (Milwaukee County) switched his party affiliation to independent.)	47	1	51	99	1
From Oct. 14, 1969 (Note: Democrat Tony Earl (Marathon County) was sworn in to replace Dave Obey.)	48	1	51	100	0
Final voting share	49%		51%		
Beginning of the next Legislature	67	0	33	100	0

== Sessions ==
- Regular session: January 6, 1969 – January 4, 1971
- September 1969 special session: September 29, 1969 – January 17, 1970
- December 1970 special session: December 22, 1970

== Leaders ==
=== Senate leadership ===
- President of the Senate: Jack B. Olson (R)
- President pro tempore: Robert P. Knowles (R–New Richmond)
- Majority leader: Ernest Keppler (R–Sheboygan)
- Minority leader: Fred Risser (D–Madison)

=== Assembly leadership ===
- Speaker of the Assembly: Harold V. Froehlich (R–Appleton)
- Speaker pro tempore: Elmer C. Nitschke (R–Beaver Dam)
- Majority leader: Paul Alfonsi (R–Minocqua)
- Minority leader: Robert T. Huber (D–West Allis)

== Members ==
=== Members of the Senate ===
Members of the Senate for the Seventy-Ninth Wisconsin Legislature:

Senate partisan representation Democratic: 11 seats Vacant: 1 seat Republican: 21 seats

Dist.	Counties	Senator	Residence	Party
01	Door, Kewaunee, & Manitowoc	Alex Meunier	Sturgeon Bay	Rep.
02	Southern Brown & Calumet	Myron P. Lotto	Green Bay	Rep.
03	Milwaukee (Southwest City)	Casimir Kendziorski	Milwaukee	Dem.
04	Milwaukee (North County)	Nile Soik	Milwaukee	Rep.
05	Milwaukee (Northwest City)	Wilfred Schuele	Milwaukee	Dem.
06	Milwaukee (North City)	Martin J. Schreiber	Milwaukee	Dem.
07	Milwaukee (Southeast County & Southeast City)	Leland McParland	Cudahy	Dem.
08	Milwaukee (Western County)	Allen Busby	West Milwaukee	Rep.
09	Milwaukee (City Downtown)	Norman Sussman (died Apr. 20, 1969)	Milwaukee	Dem.
09	Milwaukee (City Downtown)	Ronald G. Parys (from Oct. 14, 1969)	Milwaukee	Dem.
10	Buffalo, Burnett, Pepin, Pierce, Polk, & St. Croix	Robert P. Knowles	New Richmond	Rep.
11	Milwaukee (Western City)	Wayne F. Whittow	Milwaukee	Dem.
12	Clark, Forest, Lincoln, Oneida, Taylor, & Vilas	Clifford Krueger	Merrill	Rep.
13	Eastern Dodge, Jefferson, & Washington	Frank E. Panzer (died Aug. 26, 1969)	Oakfield	Rep.
13	Eastern Dodge, Jefferson, & Washington	Dale McKenna (from Nov. 11, 1969)	Jefferson	Dem.
14	Outagamie & Waupaca	Gerald Lorge	Bear Creek	Rep.
15	Eastern Rock & Walworth	James D. Swan	Elkhorn	Rep.
16	Most of Dane & Western Rock	Carl W. Thompson	Stoughton	Dem.
17	Grant, Green, Iowa, Lafayette, & Richland	Gordon Roseleip	Darlington	Rep.
18	Fond du Lac & Western Dodge	Walter G. Hollander	Rosendale	Rep.
19	Winnebago	William Draheim	Neenah	Rep.
20	Ozaukee & Sheboygan	Ernest Keppler	Sheboygan	Rep.
21	Racine (City & Southeast County)	Henry Dorman	Racine	Dem.
22	Kenosha	Joseph Lourigan	Kenosha	Dem.
23	Barron, Chippewa, Dunn, & Washburn	Holger Rasmusen	Spooner	Rep.
24	Green Lake, Portage, Waushara, & Wood	Raymond F. Heinzen	Marshfield	Rep.
25	Ashland, Bayfield, Douglas, Iron, Price, Rusk, & Sawyer	Arthur Cirilli	Superior	Rep.
26	Dane (Madison)	Fred Risser	Madison	Dem.
27	Adams, Columbia, Juneau, Marquette, & Sauk	Walter Terry	Baraboo	Rep.
28	Southwest Milwaukee, Most of Racine, & Southern Waukesha	James Devitt	Greenfield	Rep.
29	Marathon, Menominee, & Shawano	Walter Chilsen	Wausau	Rep.
30	Northern Brown, Florence, Langlade, Marinette, & Oconto	Reuben La Fave	Oconto	Rep.
31	Eau Claire, Jackson, Monroe, & Trempealeau	Raymond C. Johnson	Eau Claire	Rep.
32	Crawford, La Crosse, & Vernon	Milo Knutson	La Crosse	Rep.
33	Waukesha (Northern half)	Chester Dempsey (died Oct. 4, 1969)	Hartland	Rep.
33	Waukesha (Northern half)	--Vacant from Oct. 4, 1969--		

=== Members of the Assembly ===
Members of the Assembly for the Seventy-Ninth Wisconsin Legislature:

Assembly partisan composition Democratic: 48 seats Independent: 1 seat Republican: 51 seats

Milwaukee County districts

Senate Dist.	County	Dist.	Representative	Party	Residence
27	Adams, Juneau, & Marquette		Tommy Thompson	Rep.	Elroy
25	Ashland, Bayfield, & Iron		Ernest J. Korpela	Dem.	Washburn
23	Barron & Washburn		John C. Van Hollen	Rep.	Chetek
02	Brown	1	Jerome Quinn	Rep.	Green Bay
02	Brown	2	Lawrence J. Kafka	Rep.	New Denmark
02	Brown	3	Cletus J. Vanderperren	Dem.	Green Bay
10	Buffalo, Pepin, & Pierce		Stanley York	Rep.	River Falls
10	Burnett & Polk		Harvey L. Dueholm	Dem.	Luck
02	Calumet		Gervase Hephner	Dem.	Chilton
23	Chippewa		Bruce Peloquin	Dem.	Chippewa Falls
12	Clark		Frank Nikolay	Dem.	Colby
27	Columbia		Wesley L. Packard	Rep.	Lodi
32	Crawford & Vernon		Bernard Lewison	Rep.	Viroqua
26	Dane	1	Norman C. Anderson	Dem.	Madison
26	Dane	2	Edward Nager	Dem.	Madison
26	Dane	3	Robert Uehling	Rep.	Madison
16	Dane	4	Russel R. Weisensel	Rep.	Sun Prairie
16	Dane	5	David D. O'Malley	Dem.	Waunakee
13	Dodge	1	Esther Doughty Luckhardt	Rep.	Horicon
18	Dodge	2	Elmer C. Nitschke	Rep.	Beaver Dam
01	Door & Kewaunee		Lawrence Johnson	Rep.	Algoma
25	Douglas		Edward Stack	Dem.	Superior
23	Dunn		Alvin Baldus	Dem.	Menomonie
31	Eau Claire	1	Joseph Looby	Dem.	Eau Claire
31	Eau Claire	2	Louis V. Mato	Dem.	Fairchild
30	Florence & Marinette		William LaFave	Rep.	Peshtigo
18	Fond du Lac	1	Earl F. McEssy	Rep.	Fond du Lac
18	Fond du Lac	2	William S. Schwefel	Rep.	Oakfield
12	Forest, Oneida, & Vilas		Paul Alfonsi	Rep.	Minocqua
17	Grant		James N. Azim Jr.	Rep.	Muscoda
17	Green & Lafayette		Joseph E. Tregoning	Rep.	Shullsburg
24	Green Lake & Waushara		Jon P. Wilcox	Rep.	Wautoma
17	Iowa & Richland		Gregor J. Bock	Rep.	Highland
31	Jackson & Trempealeau		John Q. Radcliffe	Dem.	Strum
13	Jefferson		Byron F. Wackett	Rep.	Watertown
22	Kenosha	1	George Molinaro	Dem.	Kenosha
22	Kenosha	2	Russell Olson	Rep.	Randall
32	La Crosse	1	Gerald Greider	Rep.	La Crosse
32	La Crosse	2	Norbert Nuttelman	Rep.	West Salem
30	Langlade & Oconto		Milton McDougal	Rep.	Oconto Falls
12	Lincoln & Taylor		Joseph Sweda	Dem.	Lublin
01	Manitowoc	1	Donald K. Helgeson	Rep.	Manitowoc
01	Manitowoc	2	Everett E. Bolle	Dem.	Two Rivers
29	Marathon	1	Laurence J. Day	Dem.	Athens
29	Marathon	2	Dave Obey (res. Apr. 1, 1969)	Dem.	Wausau
29	Marathon	2	Tony Earl (from Oct. 14, 1969)	Dem.	Wausau
29	Menominee & Shawano		Herbert J. Grover	Dem.	Shawano
06	Milwaukee	1	Mark Lipscomb Jr.	Dem.	Milwaukee
05	Milwaukee	2	Joseph E. Jones	Dem.	Milwaukee
04	Milwaukee	3	Dennis Conta	Dem.	Milwaukee
09	Milwaukee	4	Harout O. Sanasarian	Dem.	Milwaukee
06	Milwaukee	5	Paul Sicula	Dem.	Milwaukee
09	Milwaukee	6	Lloyd Barbee	Dem.	Milwaukee
06	Milwaukee	7	William A. Johnson	Dem.	Milwaukee
11	Milwaukee	8	Joseph Czerwinski	Dem.	Milwaukee
05	Milwaukee	9	Robert L. Jackson Jr.	Dem.	Milwaukee
11	Milwaukee	10	Fred Kessler	Dem.	Milwaukee
03	Milwaukee	11	Raymond J. Tobiasz	Dem.	Milwaukee
03	Milwaukee	12	Sam L. Orlich	Dem.	Milwaukee
09	Milwaukee	13	Ronald G. Parys	Dem.	Milwaukee
03	Milwaukee	14	Jerry Kleczka	Dem.	Milwaukee
05	Milwaukee	15	Erwin G. Tamms	Rep.	Milwaukee
11	Milwaukee	16	Richard E. Pabst	Dem.	Milwaukee
07	Milwaukee	17	John E. McCormick	Dem.	Milwaukee
04	Milwaukee	18	Ervin Schneeberg	Rep.	Milwaukee
07	Milwaukee	19	Daniel D. Hanna	Dem.	Milwaukee
08	Milwaukee	20	George Klicka	Rep.	Wauwatosa
08	Milwaukee	21	James J. Lynn	Dem.	West Allis
08	Milwaukee	22	Robert T. Huber	Dem.	West Allis
28	Milwaukee	23	Jerry J. Wing	Rep.	Greenfield
28	Milwaukee	23	Jerry J. Wing	Ind.	Greenfield
07	Milwaukee	24	William P. Atkinson	Dem.	South Milwaukee
04	Milwaukee	25	Jim Sensenbrenner	Rep.	Shorewood
31	Monroe		Kyle Kenyon	Rep.	Tomah
14	Outagamie	1	Harold V. Froehlich	Rep.	Appleton
14	Outagamie	2	William J. Rogers	Dem.	Kaukauna
14	Outagamie	3	Ervin Conradt	Rep.	Shiocton
20	Ozaukee		Herbert Schowalter	Rep.	Saukville
24	Portage		Leonard A. Groshek	Dem.	Stevens Point
25	Price, Rusk & Sawyer		Willis J. Hutnik	Rep.	Ladysmith
21	Racine	1	Earl W. Warren	Dem.	Racine
21	Racine	2	Manny S. Brown	Dem.	Racine
28	Racine	3	Merrill E. Stalbaum	Rep.	Waterford
15	Rock	1	Lewis T. Mittness	Dem.	Janesville
16	Rock	2	Carolyn Blanchard	Rep.	Edgerton
15	Rock	3	George B. Belting	Rep.	Beloit
27	Sauk		Oscar A. Laper Jr.	Rep.	Rock Springs
20	Sheboygan	1	Carl Otte	Dem.	Sheboygan
20	Sheboygan	2	Vernon R. Boeckmann	Dem.	Plymouth
10	St. Croix		Robert M. Boche	Rep.	Star Prairie
22	Walworth		Clarence J. Wilger	Rep.	Elkhorn
13	Washington		Frederick C. Schroeder	Rep.	West Bend
33	Waukesha	1	Kenneth Merkel	Rep.	Brookfield
33	Waukesha	2	John M. Alberts	Rep.	Oconomowoc
33	Waukesha	3	Vincent R. Mathews	Dem.	Waukesha
28	Waukesha	4	John C. Shabaz	Rep.	New Berlin
14	Waupaca		Francis R. Byers	Rep.	Waupaca
19	Winnebago	1	Jack D. Steinhilber	Rep.	Oshkosh
19	Winnebago	2	Gordon R. Bradley	Rep.	Oshkosh
19	Winnebago	3	David O. Martin	Rep.	Menasha
24	Wood	1	John Parkin	Rep.	Marshfield
24	Wood	2	Harvey F. Gee	Rep.	Wisconsin Rapids

== Committees ==
=== Senate committees ===
- Senate Standing Committee on Agriculture – W. Terry, chair
- Senate Standing Committee on Education – H. Rasmusen, chair
- Senate Standing Committee on Governmental and Veterans Affairs – W. Draheim, chair
- Senate Standing Committee on Health and Social Services – A. Cirilli, chair
- Senate Standing Committee on Interstate Cooperation – G. Lorge, chair
- Senate Standing Committee on the Judiciary – A. Busby, chair
- Senate Standing Committee on Labor, Taxation, Insurance, and Banking – G. Lorge, chair
- Senate Standing Committee on Natural Resources – C. Krueger, chair
- Senate Standing Committee on Transportation – R. La Fave, chair
- Senate Special Committee on Committees – G. Lorge, chair
- Senate Special Committee on Legislative Procedure – R. P. Knowles, chair
- Senate Special Committee on Senate Organization – E. Keppler, chair

=== Assembly committees ===
- Assembly Standing Committee on Agriculture – N. Nuttelman, chair
- Assembly Standing Committee on Commerce and Manufactures – F. C. Schroeder, chair
- Assembly Standing Committee on Conservation – P. Alfonsi, chair
- Assembly Standing Committee on Education – L. H. Johnson, chair
- Assembly Standing Committee on Elections – S. York, chair
- Assembly Standing Committee on Excise and Fees – E. F. McEssy, chair
- Assembly Standing Committee on Highways – W. J. Hutnik, chair
- Assembly Standing Committee on Insurance and Banking – K. Kenyon, chair
- Assembly Standing Committee on the Judiciary – G. B. Belting, chair
- Assembly Standing Committee on Labor – J. N. Azim, chair
- Assembly Standing Committee on Municipalities – J. D. Steinhilber, chair
- Assembly Standing Committee on Printing – E. Conradt, chair
- Assembly Standing Committee on Public Welfare – H. F. Gee, chair
- Assembly Standing Committee on State Affairs – B. Lewison, chair
- Assembly Standing Committee on Taxation – R. Uehling, chair
- Assembly Standing Committee on Tourism – W. L. Packard, chair
- Assembly Standing Committee on Transportation – E. C. Nitschke, chair
- Assembly Standing Committee on Veterans and Military Affairs – J. C. Van Hollen, chair
- Assembly Special Committee on Assembly Organization – H. V. Froehlich, chair
- Assembly Special Committee on Engrossed Bills – E. D. Luckhardt, chair
- Assembly Special Committee on Enrolled Bills – L. J. Kafka, chair
- Assembly Special Committee on Revision – J. Quinn, chair
- Assembly Special Committee on Rules – G. J. Bock, chair
- Assembly Special Committee on Third Reading – C. Blanchard, chair

=== Joint committees ===
- Joint Standing Committee on Finance – W. G. Hollander (Sen.) & B. F. Wackett (Asm.), co-chairs
- Joint Standing Committee on Legislative Organization – P. Alfonsi (Asm.), chair
- Joint Standing Committee on Revisions, Repeals, and Uniform Laws – G. Roseleip (Sen.) & J. Sensenbrenner (Asm.), co-chairs
- Joint Legislative Council – H. V. Froehlich, chair

== Employees ==
=== Senate employees ===
- Chief Clerk: William P. Nugent
- Sergeant-at-Arms: Kenneth Nicholson

=== Assembly employees ===
- Chief Clerk: Wilmer H. Struebing
- Sergeant-at-Arms: Louis C. Romell
