= 80th Wisconsin Legislature =

Wisconsin legislative term for 1971–1972

←	79th	81st	→
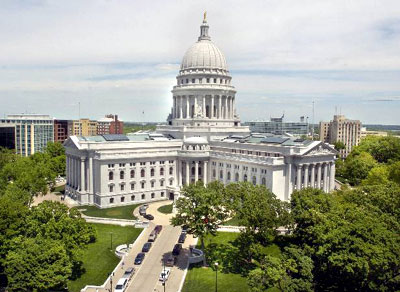
- Wisconsin State Capitol

Overview
- Legislative body: Wisconsin Legislature
- Meeting place: Wisconsin State Capitol
- Term: January 4, 1971 – January 1, 1973
- Election: November 3, 1970

Senate
- Members: 33
- Senate President: Martin J. Schreiber (D)
- President pro tempore: Robert P. Knowles (R)
- Party control: Republican

Assembly
- Members: 100
- Assembly Speaker: Robert T. Huber (D) ^{(res. Dec. 13, 1971)}; Norman C. Anderson (D) ^{(from Dec. 17, 1971)}
- Speaker pro tempore: Joseph Sweda (D)
- Party control: Democratic

Sessions
- Regular: January 4, 1971 – January 1, 1973

Special sessions
- Apr. 1972 Spec.: April 19, 1972 – April 28, 1972

The Eightieth Wisconsin Legislature convened from January 4, 1971, to January 1, 1973, in regular session, and also convened in a special session in April 1972.

The April 1972 special session was called to come to a final agreement on a pivotal redistricting plan, which eliminated an Assembly district and broke the longstanding precedent of adhering to county boundaries.

Senators representing odd-numbered districts were newly elected for this session and were serving the first two years of a four-year term. Assembly members were elected to a two-year term. Assembly members and odd-numbered senators were elected in the general election of November 3, 1970. Senators representing even-numbered districts were serving the third and fourth year of a four-year term, having been elected in the general election of November 5, 1968.

The governor of Wisconsin during this entire term was Democrat Patrick Lucey, of Crawford County, serving the first two years of a four-year term, having won election in the 1970 Wisconsin gubernatorial election.

== Major events ==
- January 4, 1971: Inauguration of Patrick Lucey as the 38th Governor of Wisconsin.
- March 1, 1971: A bomb exploded in a restroom in the United States Capitol, the Weather Underground claimed responsibility.
- April 30, 1971: The Milwaukee Bucks won the 1971 NBA Finals.
- May 3, 1971: The 1971 May Day protests against the Vietnam War began in Washington, D.C., attempting to disrupt government operations. Over 12,000 were arrested.
- July 1, 1971: The Twenty-sixth Amendment to the United States Constitution came into force when a sufficient number of states ratified.
- August 15, 1971: In what's known as the Nixon shock, U.S. President Richard Nixon signed Executive Order 11615, ending the convertibility of the U.S. dollar to gold at a fixed value. The order also imposed a 90-day freeze on wages, prices, and rents.
- December 13, 1971: Wisconsin Assembly speaker Robert T. Huber resigned his seat in the legislature to become chair of the state highway commission.
- April 4, 1972: 1972 Wisconsin Spring election:
  - Wisconsin voters ratified four amendments to the state constitution:
    - Allowing the legislature to create alternative systems of county government.
    - Allowing counties the option to retain the office of coroner or replace it with a medical examiner.
    - Allowing public school buildings to be utilized for civic, religious, or charitable events during non-school hours.
    - Allowing public school students to receive separate religious instruction outside of public school facilities during school hours.
- June 17, 1972: Five Nixon campaign operatives were arrested trying to break into the Democratic National Committee offices at the Watergate in Washington, D.C.
- November 7, 1972:
  - Richard Nixon (R) re-elected President of the United States.

== Major legislation ==
- November 19, 1971: An Act ... relating to redistricting this state pursuant to the congressional apportionment based on the 1970 census of population, 1971 Act 133.
- May 8, 1972: An Act ... relating to districting the senate and assembly based on the number of inhabitants shown by the certified results of the 1970 census of population, 1971 Act 304.

== Party summary ==
=== Senate summary ===
Senate partisan composition Democratic: 13 seats Republican: 20 seats

	Party (Shading indicates majority caucus)		Total	
	Dem.	Rep.	Total	Vacant
End of previous Legislature	11	21	32	1
Start of Reg. Session (Note: Democrat Martin J. Schreiber (6th District) resigned before the start of the session due to his election as Lieutenant Governor.)	12	20	32	1
From May 4, 1971 (Note: Democrat Mark Lipscomb Jr. (6th District) was sworn in to replace Martin J. Schreiber.)	13	20	33	0
Final voting share	39.39%	60.61%		
Beginning of the next Legislature	15	18	33	0

=== Assembly summary ===
Assembly partisan composition Democratic: 66 seats Republican: 34 seats

	Party (Shading indicates majority caucus)			Total	
	Dem.	Ind.	Rep.	Total	Vacant
End of previous Legislature	48	1	51	100	0
Start of Reg. Session	67	0	33	100	0
From Jan. 19, 1971 (Note: Democrat John Q. Radcliffe (Jackson & Trempealeau counties) resigned to accept appointment to the state highway commission.)	66	0	33	99	1
From Apr. 13, 1971 (Note: Republican Alan S. Robertson (Jackson & Trempealeau counties) was sworn in to replace John Q. Radcliffe.)	66	0	34	100	0
From May 4, 1971 (Note: Democrat Mark Lipscomb Jr. (Milwaukee County) resigned to take office in the state senate.)	65	0	34	99	1
From Sep. 20, 1971 (Note: Democrat Gus Menos (Milwaukee County) sworn in to replace Mark Lipscomb Jr.)	66	0	34	100	0
From Dec. 13, 1971 (Note: Democratic speaker Robert T. Huber (Milwaukee County) resigned to accept appointment to the state highway commission.)	65	0	34	99	1
From Apr. 19, 1972 (Note: Democrat Gary J. Barczak (Milwaukee County) was sworn in to replace Robert T. Huber.)	66	0	34	100	0
Final voting share	66%	34%			
Beginning of the next Legislature	62	0	37	99	0

== Sessions ==
- Regular session: January 4, 1971 – January 1, 1973
- April 1972 special session: April 19, 1972 – April 28, 1972

== Leaders ==
=== Senate leadership ===
- President of the Senate: Martin J. Schreiber (D)
- President pro tempore: Robert P. Knowles (R–New Richmond)
- Majority leader: Ernest Keppler (R–Sheboygan)
- Minority leader: Fred Risser (D–Madison)

=== Assembly leadership ===
- Speaker of the Assembly: Robert T. Huber (D–West Allis) (until Dec. 13, 1971)
  - Norman C. Anderson (D–Madison) (from Dec. 17, 1971)
- Speaker pro tempore: Joseph Sweda (D–Lublin)
- Majority leader: Norman C. Anderson (D–Madison) (until Dec. 17, 1971)
  - Tony Earl (D–Wausau) (from Dec. 17, 1971)
- Minority leader: Harold V. Froehlich (R–Appleton)

== Members ==
=== Members of the Senate ===
Members of the Senate for the Eightieth Wisconsin Legislature:

Senate partisan representation Democratic: 13 seats Republican: 20 seats

Dist.	Counties	Senator	Residence	Party
01	Door, Kewaunee, & Manitowoc	Jerome Martin	Whitelaw	Dem.
02	Southern Brown & Calumet	Myron P. Lotto	Green Bay	Rep.
03	Milwaukee (Southwest City)	Casimir Kendziorski	Milwaukee	Dem.
04	Milwaukee (North County)	Nile Soik	Milwaukee	Rep.
05	Milwaukee (Northwest City)	Wilfred Schuele	Milwaukee	Dem.
06	Milwaukee (North City)	--Vacant until May 4, 1971--		
06	Milwaukee (North City)	Mark Lipscomb Jr. (from May 4, 1971)	Milwaukee	Dem.
07	Milwaukee (Southeast County & Southeast City)	Kurt Frank	Milwaukee	Dem.
08	Milwaukee (Western County)	Allen Busby	West Milwaukee	Rep.
09	Milwaukee (City Downtown)	Ronald G. Parys	Milwaukee	Dem.
10	Buffalo, Burnett, Pepin, Pierce, Polk, & St. Croix	Robert P. Knowles	New Richmond	Rep.
11	Milwaukee (Western City)	Wayne F. Whittow	Milwaukee	Dem.
12	Clark, Forest, Lincoln, Oneida, Taylor, & Vilas	Clifford Krueger	Merrill	Rep.
13	Eastern Dodge, Jefferson, & Washington	Dale McKenna	Jefferson	Dem.
14	Outagamie & Waupaca	Gerald Lorge	Bear Creek	Rep.
15	Eastern Rock & Walworth	James D. Swan	Elkhorn	Rep.
16	Most of Dane & Western Rock	Carl W. Thompson	Stoughton	Dem.
17	Grant, Green, Iowa, Lafayette, & Richland	Gordon Roseleip	Darlington	Rep.
18	Fond du Lac & Western Dodge	Walter G. Hollander	Rosendale	Rep.
19	Winnebago	Jack D. Steinhilber	Oshkosh	Rep.
20	Ozaukee & Sheboygan	Ernest Keppler	Sheboygan	Rep.
21	Racine (City & Southeast County)	Henry Dorman	Racine	Dem.
22	Kenosha	Joseph Lourigan	Kenosha	Dem.
23	Barron, Chippewa, Dunn, & Washburn	Bruce Peloquin	Chippewa Falls	Dem.
24	Green Lake, Portage, Waushara, & Wood	Raymond F. Heinzen	Marshfield	Rep.
25	Ashland, Bayfield, Douglas, Iron, Price, Rusk, & Sawyer	Arthur Cirilli	Superior	Rep.
26	Dane (Madison)	Fred Risser	Madison	Dem.
27	Adams, Columbia, Juneau, Marquette, & Sauk	Everett Bidwell	Portage	Rep.
28	Southwest Milwaukee, Most of Racine, & Southern Waukesha	James Devitt	Greenfield	Rep.
29	Marathon, Menominee, & Shawano	Walter Chilsen	Wausau	Rep.
30	Northern Brown, Florence, Langlade, Marinette, & Oconto	Reuben La Fave	Oconto	Rep.
31	Eau Claire, Jackson, Monroe, & Trempealeau	Raymond C. Johnson	Eau Claire	Rep.
32	Crawford, La Crosse, & Vernon	Milo Knutson	La Crosse	Rep.
33	Waukesha (Northern half)	Roger P. Murphy	Waukesha	Rep.

=== Members of the Assembly ===
Members of the Assembly for the Eightieth Wisconsin Legislature:

Assembly partisan composition Democratic: 66 seats Republican: 34 seats

Milwaukee County districts

Senate Dist.	County	Dist.	Representative	Party	Residence
27	Adams, Juneau, & Marquette		Tommy Thompson	Rep.	Elroy
25	Ashland, Bayfield, & Iron		Ernest J. Korpela	Dem.	Washburn
23	Barron & Washburn		Kenneth M. Schricker	Rep.	Spooner
02	Brown	1	Jerome Quinn	Rep.	Green Bay
02	Brown	2	Lawrence J. Kafka	Rep.	New Denmark
02	Brown	3	Cletus J. Vanderperren	Dem.	Green Bay
10	Buffalo, Pepin, & Pierce		Michael P. Early	Dem.	River Falls
10	Burnett & Polk		Harvey L. Dueholm	Dem.	Luck
02	Calumet		Gervase Hephner	Dem.	Chilton
23	Chippewa		Terry A. Willkom	Dem.	Chippewa Falls
12	Clark		Eugene Oberle	Dem.	Stanley
27	Columbia		Robert M. Thompson	Dem.	Poynette
32	Crawford & Vernon		Bernard Lewison	Rep.	Viroqua
26	Dane	1	Norman C. Anderson	Dem.	Madison
26	Dane	2	Edward Nager	Dem.	Madison
26	Dane	3	Midge Miller	Dem.	Madison
16	Dane	4	Harland E. Everson	Dem.	Sun Prairie
16	Dane	5	David D. O'Malley	Dem.	Waunakee
13	Dodge	1	Esther Doughty Luckhardt	Rep.	Horicon
18	Dodge	2	Thomas S. Hanson	Dem.	Beaver Dam
01	Door & Kewaunee		Lary J. Swoboda	Dem.	Luxemburg
25	Douglas		Edward Stack	Dem.	Superior
23	Dunn		Alvin Baldus	Dem.	Menomonie
31	Eau Claire	1	Joseph Looby	Dem.	Eau Claire
31	Eau Claire	2	Louis V. Mato	Dem.	Fairchild
30	Florence & Marinette		William LaFave	Rep.	Peshtigo
18	Fond du Lac	1	Earl F. McEssy	Rep.	Fond du Lac
18	Fond du Lac	2	William S. Schwefel	Rep.	Oakfield
12	Forest, Oneida, & Vilas		Ellsworth K. Gaulke	Dem.	Lac du Flambeau
17	Grant		James N. Azim Jr.	Rep.	Muscoda
17	Green & Lafayette		Joseph E. Tregoning	Rep.	Shullsburg
24	Green Lake & Waushara		Jon P. Wilcox	Rep.	Wautoma
17	Iowa & Richland		Joanne M. Duren	Dem.	Cazenovia
31	Jackson & Trempealeau		John Q. Radcliffe (res. Jan. 19, 1971)	Dem.	Strum
31	Jackson & Trempealeau		Alan S. Robertson (from Apr. 13, 1971)	Rep.	Blair
13	Jefferson		Byron F. Wackett	Rep.	Watertown
22	Kenosha	1	George Molinaro	Dem.	Kenosha
22	Kenosha	2	Eugene Dorff	Dem.	Kenosha
32	La Crosse	1	Gerald Greider	Rep.	La Crosse
32	La Crosse	2	Virgil Roberts	Dem.	Holmen
30	Langlade & Oconto		Milton McDougal	Rep.	Oconto Falls
12	Lincoln & Taylor		Joseph Sweda	Dem.	Lublin
01	Manitowoc	1	Donald K. Helgeson	Rep.	Manitowoc
01	Manitowoc	2	Everett E. Bolle	Dem.	Two Rivers
29	Marathon	1	Laurence J. Day	Dem.	Athens
29	Marathon	2	Tony Earl	Dem.	Wausau
29	Menominee & Shawano		Herbert J. Grover	Dem.	Shawano
06	Milwaukee	1	Mark Lipscomb Jr. (res. May 4, 1971)	Dem.	Milwaukee
06	Milwaukee	1	Gus Menos (from Sep. 20, 1971)	Dem.	Milwaukee
05	Milwaukee	2	Joseph E. Jones	Dem.	Milwaukee
04	Milwaukee	3	Dennis Conta	Dem.	Milwaukee
09	Milwaukee	4	Harout O. Sanasarian	Dem.	Milwaukee
06	Milwaukee	5	Paul Sicula	Dem.	Milwaukee
09	Milwaukee	6	Lloyd Barbee	Dem.	Milwaukee
06	Milwaukee	7	William A. Johnson	Dem.	Milwaukee
11	Milwaukee	8	Joseph Czerwinski	Dem.	Milwaukee
05	Milwaukee	9	Robert L. Jackson Jr.	Dem.	Milwaukee
11	Milwaukee	10	Fred Kessler	Dem.	Milwaukee
03	Milwaukee	11	Raymond J. Tobiasz	Dem.	Milwaukee
03	Milwaukee	12	Sam L. Orlich	Dem.	Milwaukee
09	Milwaukee	13	Glenn E. Bultman	Dem.	Milwaukee
03	Milwaukee	14	Jerry Kleczka	Dem.	Milwaukee
05	Milwaukee	15	James W. Wahner	Dem.	Milwaukee
11	Milwaukee	16	Richard E. Pabst	Dem.	Milwaukee
07	Milwaukee	17	John E. McCormick	Dem.	Milwaukee
04	Milwaukee	18	David G. Berger	Dem.	Milwaukee
07	Milwaukee	19	Daniel D. Hanna	Dem.	Milwaukee
08	Milwaukee	20	George Klicka	Rep.	Wauwatosa
08	Milwaukee	21	James J. Lynn	Dem.	West Allis
08	Milwaukee	22	Robert T. Huber (res. Dec. 13, 1971)	Dem.	West Allis
08	Milwaukee	22	Gary J. Barczak (from Apr. 19, 1972)	Dem.	West Allis
28	Milwaukee	23	James A. Rutkowski	Dem.	Hales Corners
07	Milwaukee	24	William P. Atkinson	Dem.	South Milwaukee
04	Milwaukee	25	Jim Sensenbrenner	Rep.	Shorewood
31	Monroe		Robert Quackenbush	Rep.	Sparta
14	Outagamie	1	Harold V. Froehlich	Rep.	Appleton
14	Outagamie	2	William J. Rogers	Dem.	Kaukauna
14	Outagamie	3	Ervin Conradt	Rep.	Shiocton
20	Ozaukee		Herbert Schowalter	Rep.	Saukville
24	Portage		Leonard A. Groshek	Dem.	Stevens Point
25	Price, Rusk & Sawyer		John W. Slaby	Dem.	Phillips
21	Racine	1	R. Michael Ferrall	Dem.	Racine
21	Racine	2	Manny S. Brown	Dem.	Racine
28	Racine	3	Merrill E. Stalbaum	Rep.	Waterford
15	Rock	1	Lewis T. Mittness	Dem.	Janesville
16	Rock	2	Janet Soergel Mielke	Dem.	Milton
15	Rock	3	Gary K. Johnson	Dem.	Beloit
27	Sauk		Kenyon E. Giese	Rep.	Sauk City
20	Sheboygan	1	Carl Otte	Dem.	Sheboygan
20	Sheboygan	2	Vernon R. Boeckmann	Dem.	Plymouth
10	St. Croix		Leo Mohn	Dem.	Woodville
22	Walworth		Clarence J. Wilger	Rep.	Elkhorn
13	Washington		Frederick C. Schroeder	Rep.	West Bend
33	Waukesha	1	Kenneth Merkel	Rep.	Brookfield
33	Waukesha	2	John M. Alberts	Rep.	Oconomowoc
33	Waukesha	3	Edward Jackamonis	Dem.	Waukesha
28	Waukesha	4	John C. Shabaz	Rep.	New Berlin
14	Waupaca		Francis R. Byers	Rep.	Waupaca
19	Winnebago	1	Jon R. Guiles	Rep.	Oshkosh
19	Winnebago	2	Gordon R. Bradley	Rep.	Oshkosh
19	Winnebago	3	Michael G. Ellis	Rep.	Neenah
24	Wood	1	John Oestreicher	Dem.	Marshfield
24	Wood	2	Marlin Schneider	Dem.	Wisconsin Rapids

== Employees ==
=== Senate employees ===
- Chief Clerk: William P. Nugent
- Sergeant-at-Arms: Kenneth Nicholson

=== Assembly employees ===
- Chief Clerk: Thomas P. Fox
- Sergeant-at-Arms: William F. Quick
