= Wisconsin's Sauk County Assembly district =

Former American legislative district

Wisconsin's Sauk County State Assembly district
- Obsolete
- Notes: 1848–1851; 1912–1972

Wisconsin's Sauk County Assembly district was a district in the Wisconsin State Assembly for much of the history of the state of Wisconsin, up to the legislative redistricting reforms of 1972 which created the current numbered districts. Located in central Wisconsin, the district comprised the whole of Sauk County, Wisconsin, and was one of the 66 original Assembly districts defined in Article XIV of the Constitution of Wisconsin.

The district was in use for elections from 1848 through 1851, then again for elections from 1912 until 1970 (inclusive).

== List of representatives ==
List of representatives from the Sauk County district
Member	Party	Residence	Term start	Term end	Leg.
District created
Delando Pratt	Dem.	Baraboo	June 5, 1848	January 1, 1849	1st
Cyrus Leland	Dem.	Prairie du Sac	January 1, 1849	January 7, 1850	2nd
Caleb Crosswell	Dem.	Baraboo	January 7, 1850	January 6, 1851	3rd
Nathaniel Perkins	Dem.	Sauk City	January 6, 1851	January 5, 1852	4th
Jonathan W. Fyffe	Whig	Prairie du Sac	January 5, 1852	January 3, 1853	5th
District abolished by 1852 Wisconsin Act 499; Sauk County became part of the Adams–Sauk district
District re-established by 1911 Wisconsin Act 661
George Carpenter	Rep.	Baraboo	January 6, 1913	January 4, 1915	51st
Robert B. Dickie	Rep.	North Freedom	January 4, 1915	January 1, 1917	52nd
George Carpenter	Rep.	Baraboo	January 1, 1917	January 6, 1919	53rd
George H. Hood	Rep.	Baraboo	January 6, 1919	January 3, 1921	54th
Carl Koenig	Rep.	Westfield	January 3, 1921	January 1, 1923	55th
Dwight S. Welch	Rep.		January 1, 1923	January 5, 1925	56th
Carl Koenig	Rep.	Loganville	January 5, 1925	January 7, 1929	57th 58th
Robert J. Keller	Rep.	Sauk City	January 7, 1929	January 2, 1933	59th 60th
Isaac C. Evans	Dem.	Spring Green	January 2, 1933	January 7, 1935	61st
George J. Woerth	Prog.	Sauk City	January 7, 1935	January 2, 1939	62nd 63rd
Charles Enge	Rep.	Sauk City	January 2, 1939	January 6, 1941	64th
George J. Woerth	Prog.	Sauk City	January 6, 1941	January 4, 1943	65th
George J. Woerth	Rep.	Prairie du Sac	January 4, 1943	January 3, 1949	66th 67th 68th
J. Riley Stone	Rep.	Baraboo; Reedsburg	January 3, 1949	January 5, 1959	69th 70th 71st 72nd 73rd
Walter Terry	Rep.	Baraboo	January 5, 1959	January 2, 1967	74th 75th 76th 77th
Oscar A. Laper Jr.	Rep.	Rock Springs	January 2, 1967	January 4, 1971	78th 79th
Kenyon E. Giese	Rep.	Sauk City	January 4, 1971	January 1, 1973	80th
District abolished by 1971 Wisconsin Act 304; Sauk County divided into the 79th and 80th Assembly districts
