= Wisconsin's Iowa–Richland Assembly district =

Former American legislative district

Wisconsin's Iowa–Richland State Assembly district
- Obsolete
- Notes: 1964–1972

Wisconsin's Iowa–Richland Assembly district was a district in the Wisconsin State Assembly from 1964 until the legislative redistricting reforms of 1972 which created the current numbered districts. Located in southwest Wisconsin, the district comprised the whole of Iowa County and Richland County, Wisconsin. The district was created by the court-ordered redistricting that occurred as a remedy for the 1964 Wisconsin Supreme Court decision State ex rel. Reynolds v. Zimmerman (23 Wis. 2d 606).

== List of representatives ==
List of representatives from the Iowa–Richland district
Member	Party	Residence	Term start	Term end	Leg.
District created
Gregor J. Bock	Rep.	Highland	January 4, 1965	January 4, 1971	77th 78th 79th
Joanne M. Duren	Dem.	Cazenovia	January 4, 1971	January 1, 1973	80th
District abolished by 1971 Wisconsin Act 304; Iowa and Richland counties became part of the 50th Assembly district
