= Jim Moody =

20th century American politician

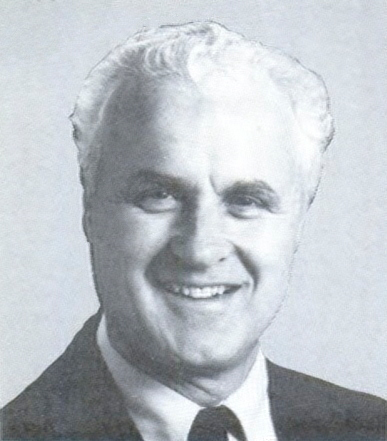
- Jim Moody in 1989

Member of the U.S. House of Representatives from Wisconsin's 5th district
- In office January 3, 1983 – January 3, 1993
- Preceded by: Henry S. Reuss
- Succeeded by: Tom Barrett

Member of the Wisconsin Senate from the 9th district
- In office January 1, 1979 – January 3, 1983
- Preceded by: Ronald G. Parys
- Succeeded by: Carl Otte

Member of the Wisconsin State Assembly from the 25th district
- In office January 3, 1977 – January 1, 1979
- Preceded by: Dennis Conta
- Succeeded by: Barbara Ulichny

Personal details
- Born: James Powers Moody; September 2, 1935 Richlands, Virginia, U.S.
- Died: March 22, 2019 (aged 83) Bethesda, Maryland, U.S.
- Party: Democratic
- Spouse: Janice Boettcher

James Powers Moody (September 2, 1935 – March 22, 2019) was an American economist and Democratic politician. He served five terms as the U.S. representative for Wisconsin's 5th congressional district (1983–1993). At the time, the 5th congressional district comprised the north half of Milwaukee County, including much of the city of Milwaukee. Earlier in his career, he represented downtown Milwaukee in the Wisconsin State Senate and Assembly.

== Background ==
Moody was born in Richlands, Virginia; he graduated from Anglo American High School in Athens, Greece, in 1953 and earned his bachelor's degree from Haverford College in 1957. After two years of financial work on Wall Street, he became the CARE representative in Yugoslavia. After two years in Yugoslavia, he was assigned by CARE to Iran to lead a special feeding program assisting hospitals and schools and direct periodic earthquake relief.

During the early Peace Corps period he set up the agency's first programs in Pakistan and Bangladesh—the first two Peace Corps programs in Continental Asia. His responsibilities included negotiating the country-PC agreements and matching volunteers with their assignments.

He returned to Washington, D.C., for the next year as Pak desk officer, then became the loan officer for the USAID capital development program for Southeast Asia. After two years at USAID he earned an MPA at Harvard's John F. Kennedy School of Government. He then earned a Ph.D. in economics at the University of California, Berkeley, after which he was employed as an Assistant Professor of Economics at the University of Wisconsin–Milwaukee. He also taught occasional courses at the University of Wisconsin–Madison.

== Political career ==
Taking leave from university teaching, Moody was elected to the Wisconsin State Assembly in 1976, then was elected to the State Senate in 1978, where among his contributions were bills that deregulated monopoly truck hauling in the state and ended the commitment to build a major freeway through Milwaukee's lakefront park. He was also the floor leader in passing no-fault divorce legislation and decriminalization of homosexual activities.

In 1982, he was elected to the United States Congress to represent Wisconsin's 5th congressional district, serving five terms through 1992. In Congress he was elected by his peers to the House Ways & Means Committee and there assigned to the International Trade and Health/Medicare subcommittees. Among his bills he sponsored or co-sponsored was legislation for single-payer universal health care, wilderness preservation, pro-competition truck hauling, as well as legislation to prevent federal start-up employment incentives to be used for strike breaking. While in Congress he co-founded the organization that became the National Security Archive Project which advocates for transparency in federal government actions, especially overseas. Also, based on his experience in Bangladesh, he co-founded the Congressional support coalition for International Family Planning (then a very embroiled issue strongly opposed by President Reagan). His 1992 race for the U.S. Senate—based on the "up or out" mantra of the Peace Corps—did not bring victory.

== Post-congressional career ==
Following the November 1992 election, Moody served as the deputy director of the team preparing President-elect Bill Clinton's first federal budget (labeled "Eat Your Broccoli First"). In 1994 he taught health care economics at the Medical College of Wisconsin and graduate level economics at the Maryland School of Public Policy.

In 1995 Moody became the Vice President and Chief Financial Officer of the UN agency International Fund for Agricultural Development, which focuses on raising productivity and living standards in the agricultural sectors of developing countries. Moody administered the agency's annual budget of $50 million and managed $25+ million of the agency's assets and investment portfolio.

In 1997, Moody became President and CEO of InterAction, a D.C.-based coalition of American non-profit organizations. In 2000 he became a Senior Financial Advisor at Morgan Stanley and in 2005 he moved to Merrill Lynch as Financial Advisor and Vice President. In November, 2012 he became an Investment Advisor Representative Associate at Oppenheimer.

He was a board member of the National Iranian American Council (NIAC).

Moody was married to Janice Boettcher and had a son and daughter. He was fluent in Greek, Spanish, Serbo-Croatian, Persian and French.

Moody died at a hospital in Maryland on March 22, 2019, at the age of 83.

Wisconsin State Assembly
Preceded by Dennis Conta	Member of the Wisconsin State Assembly from the 25th district January 3, 1977 – January 1, 1979	Succeeded by Barbara Ulichny
Wisconsin Senate
Preceded by Ronald G. Parys	Member of the Wisconsin Senate from the 9th district January 1, 1979 – January 3, 1983	Succeeded by Carl Otte
U.S. House of Representatives
Preceded by Henry S. Reuss	Member of the U.S. House of Representatives from Wisconsin's 5th congressional district 1983–1993	Succeeded by Tom Barrett
