= Bultman =

Bultman is a surname. Notable people with the surname include:

- Art Bultman (Arthur Frank Bultman; 1907–1967) was an American football player
- Fritz Bultman (1919–1985), American painter, sculptor, and collagist
- Glenn E. Bultman (born 1940), American politician
- Jan Bultman (born 1942), Dutch water polo player
- Marion Bultman (born 1960), Dutch sailor
- James Bultman, American football coach

== See also ==
- Rudolf Bultmann (1884–1976), German Lutheran theologian and academic
