= Greider =

Greider is a surname. Notable people with the surname include:

- Carol W. Greider (born 1961), American molecular biologist
- Gerald Greider (1923–1982), Republican politician in Wisconsin, USA
- Göran Greider (born 1959), Swedish social democratic journalist, author and poet
- William Greider (1936–2019), American economics author
