= Ervin Mueller =

20th century American politician

Member of the Wisconsin State Assembly from the Milwaukee 13th district
- In office January 2, 1961 – January 7, 1963
- Preceded by: Marty Larsen
- Succeeded by: Raymond Lee Lathan

Personal details
- Born: September 2, 1904 Milwaukee, Wisconsin, U.S.
- Died: July 26, 1986 (aged 81) Los Angeles County, California, U.S.
- Party: Republican; Democratic (before 1966)
- Spouse: Mabel Rose Kieffer (m. 1927–1986)
- Children: 4
- Occupation: Sales

Ervin William Mueller (September 2, 1904 – July 26, 1986) was an American salesman and politician from Milwaukee, Wisconsin. He was a Democratic member of the Wisconsin State Assembly in the 1961 session and later ran unsuccessfully for the Assembly as a Republican.

== Biography ==
Ervin Mueller was born in Milwaukee, Wisconsin, on September 2, 1904. He was educated in the Milwaukee public schools, and then attended Milwaukee's Hoffman Business College. He was employed in a food wholesale business for at least 25 years, working as a sales manager. He became involved with the Democratic Party of Wisconsin and was chairman of his local ward Democratic organization.

He was elected to the Wisconsin State Assembly in 1960, serving a two-year term. He ran for re-election in 1962 but was defeated in the Democratic primary. He subsequently joined the Republican Party and ran for Assembly again in 1966, but lost the general election to Democrat Joseph E. Jones.

Ervin Mueller died July 26, 1986, in Los Angeles County, California.

Wisconsin State Assembly
| Preceded by Marty Larsen | Member of the Wisconsin State Assembly from the Milwaukee 13th district January 2, 1961 – January 7, 1963 | Succeeded by Raymond Lee Lathan |
