= Herbert Schowalter =

20th century American politician

Member of the Wisconsin State Assembly from the Ozaukee County district
- In office January 6, 1969 – January 1, 1973
- Preceded by: J. Curtis McKay
- Succeeded by: District abolished

Personal details
- Born: March 30, 1927 Milwaukee, Wisconsin, U.S.
- Died: March 23, 1998 (aged 70) Mesa, Arizona, U.S.
- Cause of death: Pancreatic cancer
- Resting place: Queen of Heaven Catholic Cemetery, Mesa, Arizona
- Party: Republican
- Spouse: Geraldine Margaret Sinnen (m. 1949–1998)
- Children: 3
- Education: DeVry Technical Institute
- Occupation: Electrical engineer

Military service
- Allegiance: United States
- Branch/service: United States Navy
- Years of service: 1945–1946; 1951–1952
- Battles/wars: World War II; Korean War

Herbert Joseph Schowalter (March 30, 1927 – March 23, 1998) was an American electrical engineer and Republican politician from Saukville, Wisconsin. He served two terms in the Wisconsin State Assembly, representing Ozaukee County during the 1969 and 1971 sessions.

== Biography ==
Herbert Schowalter was born March 30, 1927, in Milwaukee, Wisconsin. As a child, he moved with his parents to Saukville, Wisconsin, and graduated from Port Washington High School in 1945. Immediately after graduating from high school, Schowalter enlisted in the United States Navy for service in World War II. After returning from the war, he began his career with the Square D company, but returned to school in 1949, moving to Chicago to pursue a degree in electrical engineering from DeVry Technical Institute, using the G.I. Bill. But as he was preparing to graduate in 1951, he was recalled to service in the U.S. Navy due to the Korean War.

After his second stint in the Navy, Schowalter returned to work at Square D, which was his primary employer for the rest of his career. Schowalter was active in local affairs as a member of the American Legion, the Catholic church community, and chamber of commerce. He entered elected office for the first time in 1961, when he became a member of the Saukville village board.

In 1968, incumbent state representative J. Curtis McKay chose not to run for re-election to the Wisconsin State Assembly. Schowalter entered the race for the Republican Party nomination in the district, which then comprised just his native Ozaukee County. He faced only one opponent in the Republican primary and prevailed with 83% of the vote. He went on to win 63% of the vote in the November 1968 general election and began his legislative service in the 79th Wisconsin Legislature. He was re-elected in 1970, and was regarded as a promising new member of the Republican conference, but he announced in 1972 that his employer, Square D, was transferring him out of state. He used his personal circumstances to accuse Democrats of pursuing policies in the state which drove employers to flee. Schowalter had advocated for a right-to-work law in Wisconsin earlier during the 1971 legislative session.

Shortly after the end of the 1971 legislative session, he relocated to Knightdale, North Carolina, where he resided for ten years. While in North Carolina, he developed neurological symptoms that were eventually diagnosed as Multiple Sclerosis, which soon forced his retirement. He subsequently moved to Mesa, Arizona, in 1983, and remained there until his death from pancreatic cancer in 1998. By the time of his cancer diagnosis in 1996, he was already nearly completely paralyzed and a wheelchair user due to his multiple sclerosis.

== Personal life and family ==
Herbert Schowalter married Geraldine Margaret Sinnen of Belgium, Wisconsin, on June 4, 1949. They were both active in the Catholic church in each community where they resided. They had three daughters together and were married for nearly 49 years before his death in 1998.

== Electoral history ==
=== Wisconsin Assembly (1968, 1970) ===
Year	Election	Date	Elected				Defeated				Total	Plurality
1968	Primary	Sep. 10	Herbert Schowalter	Republican	2,086	82.81%	Howard H. Lotze	Rep.	433	17.19%	2,519	1,653
1968	General	Nov. 5	Herbert Schowalter	Republican	12,753	63.42%	Marvin H. Huiras	Dem.	7,357	36.58%	20,110	5,396
1970	Primary	Sep. 8	Herbert Schowalter (inc)	Republican	3,070	83.88%	Dennis L. Mattson	Rep.	590	16.12%	3,660	2,480
1970	General	Nov. 3	Herbert Schowalter (inc)	Republican	11,197	66.25%	Michael J. Weber Jr.	Dem.	5,705	33.75%	16,902	5,492

Wisconsin State Assembly
Preceded by J. Curtis McKay	Member of the Wisconsin State Assembly from the Ozaukee County district January 6, 1969 – January 1, 1973	District abolished
