= James W. Wahner =

American politician

Majority Leader of the Wisconsin Assembly
- In office January 3, 1977 – January 26, 1980
- Preceded by: Terry A. Willkom
- Succeeded by: Gary K. Johnson

Member of the Wisconsin State Assembly
- In office January 1, 1973 – January 26, 1980
- Preceded by: District established
- Succeeded by: Lois Plous
- Constituency: 15th district
- In office January 4, 1971 – January 1, 1973
- Preceded by: Erwin G. Tamms
- Succeeded by: District abolished
- Constituency: Milwaukee 15th District

Personal details
- Born: November 10, 1939 (age 86) Milwaukee, Wisconsin
- Party: Democratic
- Education: American University (B.A.); University of Wisconsin–Milwaukee (M.A.)

Military service
- Allegiance: United States
- Branch/service: United States Army
- Years of service: 1959–1962

James W. Wahner (born November 10, 1939) is a retired American government administrator and Democratic politician. He served 9 years in the Wisconsin State Assembly, representing Milwaukee County, and was majority leader from January 1977 until his resignation in January 1980. He left the Assembly to serve as Midwest Regional Director of the Federal Emergency Management Agency in the administration of U.S. President Jimmy Carter.

== Biography ==
Wahner was born in Milwaukee, Wisconsin. He graduated from Mercer High School and served in the United States Army from 1959 to 1962. He received his bachelor's degree from American University in 1966 and his master's degree in political science from University of Wisconsin–Milwaukee. He also took graduate classes for his doctorate at University of Wisconsin–Milwaukee and also taught there. He was an aide to the mayor of Milwaukee and was a Democrat. Wahner served in the Wisconsin Assembly from 1971 to 1980. In the 1992 Wisconsin Spring Primary Election, Wahner ran for Milwaukee County Executive and lost the election.

Wisconsin State Assembly
Preceded by Erwin G. Tamms	Member of the Wisconsin State Assembly from the Milwaukee 15th district January 4, 1971 – January 1, 1973	District abolished
New district	Member of the Wisconsin State Assembly from the 15th district January 1, 1973 – January 26, 1980	Succeeded by Lois Plous
Preceded by Terry A. Willkom	Majority Leader of the Wisconsin Assembly; January 3, 1977 – January 26, 1980	Succeeded by Gary K. Johnson
