= Kenyon E. Giese =

American dairy farmer and politician (1933–1975)

Kenyon Giese

Member of the Wisconsin State Assembly
- In office January 1, 1973 – August 7, 1975
- Preceded by: District established
- Succeeded by: Leroy Litscher
- Constituency: 80th district
- In office January 4, 1971 – January 1, 1973
- Preceded by: Oscar A. Laper Jr.
- Succeeded by: District abolished
- Constituency: Sauk County district

Personal details
- Born: Kenyon Ezra Giese; December 21, 1933 Wisconsin, U.S.
- Died: August 7, 1975 (aged 41) Methodist Hospital, Madison, Wisconsin, U.S.
- Resting place: Bethlehem United Methodist Church Cemetery, Black Hawk, Wisconsin
- Party: Republican
- Spouse: Marilyn Bangs Dalton (m. 1959–1975)
- Education: University of Wisconsin-Madison (B.S.)
- Profession: dairy farmer, politician

Military service
- Allegiance: United States
- Branch/service: United States Army
- Years of service: 1957–1959

Kenyon Ezra Giese (December 21, 1933 – August 7, 1975) was an American dairy farmer and Republican politician. He was elected to three terms in the Wisconsin State Assembly, representing Sauk County, but died of cancer in the first year of his third term.

== Biography ==
Giese was born on December 21, 1933. He earned his bachelor's degree from the University of Wisconsin-Madison in 1955. From 1957 to 1959, he served in the United States Army.

== Political career ==
Giese was elected to the Assembly in 1970 and reelected in 1972 and 1974. He was a Republican. He died in office on August 7, 1975, following surgery for a brain tumor. He is buried at Bethlehem United Methodist Church Cemetery in Black Hawk, Wisconsin.
