= Brown Deer, Wisconsin =

Village in Milwaukee County, Wisconsin

- Village
- Location of Brown Deer in Milwaukee County, Wisconsin
- Coordinates: 43°10′22″N 87°58′40″W
- Country: United States
- State: Wisconsin
- County: Milwaukee

Area
  - Total: 4.39 sq mi (11.38 km^{2})
  - Land: 4.39 sq mi (11.38 km^{2})
  - Water: 0 sq mi (0.00 km^{2})
- Elevation: 692 ft (211 m)

Population (2020)
  - Total: 12,507
  - Density: 2,840/sq mi (1,095/km^{2})
- Time zone: UTC-6 (Central (CST))
  - Summer (DST): UTC-5 (CDT)
- Area code: 414
- FIPS code: 55-10375
- GNIS feature ID: 1562261
- Website: www.browndeerwi.org

Brown Deer is a village in Milwaukee County, Wisconsin, United States. A suburb of Milwaukee, it is part of the Milwaukee metropolitan area. The population was 12,507 at the 2020 census.

== History ==
The Brown Deer area was organized as part of the Town of Milwaukee in 1835, and the first white settlers began arriving around that time from New England and New York, including some settlers from Granville, New York. In 1841, the Town of Milwaukee was subdivided and the Brown Deer area became part of the new Town of Granville. In the 1800s, the town was a predominantly agricultural community, and many residents were of German and Irish extraction.

The Village of Brown Deer has its origins in a rural hamlet that formed at a crossroads in the northeastern quadrant of the Town of Granville in the 1870s. The area remained characteristically rural from the 19th century through the mid-1940s, when the post–World War II economic expansion caused a building boom in the area, and many of the farms were subdivided into suburban residential neighborhoods.

In the 1950s, Milwaukee mayor Frank Zeidler's administration pursued an agenda of annexing unincorporated areas of Milwaukee County to grow the city. In 1951 and 1952, the city began proceedings to annex parts of the Town of Granville. Some residents in the Brown Deer area did not want their community to become part of Milwaukee and organized to incorporate as a village in 1953 in order to stave off annexation. Milwaukee challenged the incorporation, but after a protracted court battle, the Wisconsin Supreme Court upheld Brown Deer's right to incorporate. When the Village of Brown Deer incorporated on January 20, 1955, it had an area of 1.8 square miles.

In 1955, the Village of Brown Deer and the City of Milwaukee scrambled to annex more of the Town of Granville, with Brown Deer making five annexations by the year's end. In 1956, the city and the village both attempted to annex all of the Town of Granville's remaining territory. The municipalities began a court battle that would last until 1962. Most of Granville's residents supported annexation by Milwaukee, but some favored Brown Deer's lower tax rates. The Wisconsin Supreme Court initially awarded the territory to Brown Deer, before overruling its own decision and awarding the territory to Milwaukee in 1959. The courts reaffirmed their decision in 1962 when they ruled that Brown Deer's 1956 annexation ordinances were invalid, and awarded sixteen square miles of the former Town of Granville to the City of Milwaukee.

In August 2013, the village was listed as 19th on CNNMoney's rankings of Best Places to Live – Where Homes Are Affordable, the highest ranking community in the state of Wisconsin.

== Geography ==
Brown Deer is located at 43°10′22″N 87°58′40″W (43.172858, −87.977899).

According to the United States Census Bureau, the village has a total area of 4.40 square miles (11.40 km^{2}), all land.

== Demographics ==
Historical population
| Census | Pop. | Note | %± |
|---|---|---|---|
| 1960 | 11,280 | | — |
| 1970 | 12,582 | | 11.5% |
| 1980 | 12,921 | | 2.7% |
| 1990 | 12,236 | | −5.3% |
| 2000 | 12,170 | | −0.5% |
| 2010 | 11,999 | | −1.4% |
| 2020 | 12,507 | | 4.2% |
U.S. Decennial Census

=== Racial and ethnic composition ===
Brown Deer village, Wisconsin – Racial and ethnic composition Note: the US Census treats Hispanic/Latino as an ethnic category. This table excludes Latinos from the racial categories and assigns them to a separate category. Hispanics/Latinos may be of any race.
| Race / Ethnicity (NH = Non-Hispanic) | Pop 2000 | Pop 2010 | Pop 2020 | % 2000 | % 2010 | % 2020 |
|---|---|---|---|---|---|---|
| White alone (NH) | 9,822 | 7,170 | 5,510 | 80.71% | 59.75% | 44.06% |
| Black or African American alone (NH) | 1,516 | 3,387 | 4,664 | 12.46% | 28.23% | 37.29% |
| Native American or Alaska Native alone (NH) | 28 | 42 | 37 | 0.23% | 0.35% | 0.30% |
| Asian alone (NH) | 318 | 582 | 976 | 2.61% | 4.85% | 7.80% |
| Native Hawaiian or Pacific Islander alone (NH) | 5 | 5 | 7 | 0.04% | 0.04% | 0.06% |
| Other race alone (NH) | 17 | 27 | 66 | 0.14% | 0.23% | 0.53% |
| Mixed race or Multiracial (NH) | 204 | 315 | 555 | 1.68% | 2.63% | 4.44% |
| Hispanic or Latino (any race) | 260 | 471 | 692 | 2.14% | 3.93% | 5.53% |
| Total | 12,170 | 11,999 | 12,507 | 100.00% | 100.00% | 100.00% |

=== Income and poverty ===
As of 2000 the median income for a household in the village was $61,097. The per capita income for the village was $28,525. About 5.8% people of all ages live below the poverty line. The median value of owner occupied housing units was $175,600.

=== 2020 census ===
As of the 2020 census, Brown Deer had a population of 12,507. The median age was 42.8 years. 20.5% of residents were under the age of 18 and 20.4% of residents were 65 years of age or older. For every 100 females there were 88.5 males, and for every 100 females age 18 and over there were 84.4 males age 18 and over.

100.0% of residents lived in urban areas, while 0.0% lived in rural areas.

There were 5,524 households in Brown Deer, of which 26.1% had children under the age of 18 living in them. Of all households, 39.8% were married-couple households, 18.7% were households with a male householder and no spouse or partner present, and 35.0% were households with a female householder and no spouse or partner present. About 36.0% of all households were made up of individuals and 15.5% had someone living alone who was 65 years of age or older.

There were 5,865 housing units, of which 5.8% were vacant. The homeowner vacancy rate was 1.0% and the rental vacancy rate was 8.6%.

Racial composition as of the 2020 census
| Race | Number | Percent |
|---|---|---|
| White | 5,634 | 45.0% |
| Black or African American | 4,731 | 37.8% |
| American Indian and Alaska Native | 44 | 0.4% |
| Asian | 992 | 7.9% |
| Native Hawaiian and Other Pacific Islander | 9 | 0.1% |
| Some other race | 277 | 2.2% |
| Two or more races | 820 | 6.6% |

=== 2010 census ===
As of the census of 2010, there were 11,999 people, 5,275 households, and 3,199 families residing in the village. The population density was 2,729.5 people per square mile (1,694.5/km^{2}). There were 5,579 housing units at an average density of 1,267.95 per square mile (787.8/km^{2}). The racial makeup of the village was 61.9% White, 28.6% African American, 0.04% Native American, 4.9% Asian, 0.1% Pacific Islander, 0.01% from other races, and 3.1% from two or more races. Hispanic or Latino of any race were 3.9% of the population.

Brown Deer is one of only three Milwaukee suburbs (Glendale and West Milwaukee being the others) where African-Americans make up at least 10% of the general population.

There were 5,275 households, of which 26.4% had children under the age of 18 living with them, 45.5% were married couples living together, 11.4% had a female householder with no husband present, and 39.4% were non-families. 33.7% of all households were made up of individuals living alone, and 12.5% had someone living alone who was 65 years of age or older. The average household size was 2.27 and the average family size was 2.91.

In the village, the population was spread out, with 20.9% under the age of 18, 7.5% from 18 to 24, 12.8% from 25 to 34, 20.7% from 35 to 49, 21.5% from 50 to 64, and 16.6% who were 65 years of age or older. The median age was 41.8 years. 52% of the population was female and 48% was male.

== Education ==
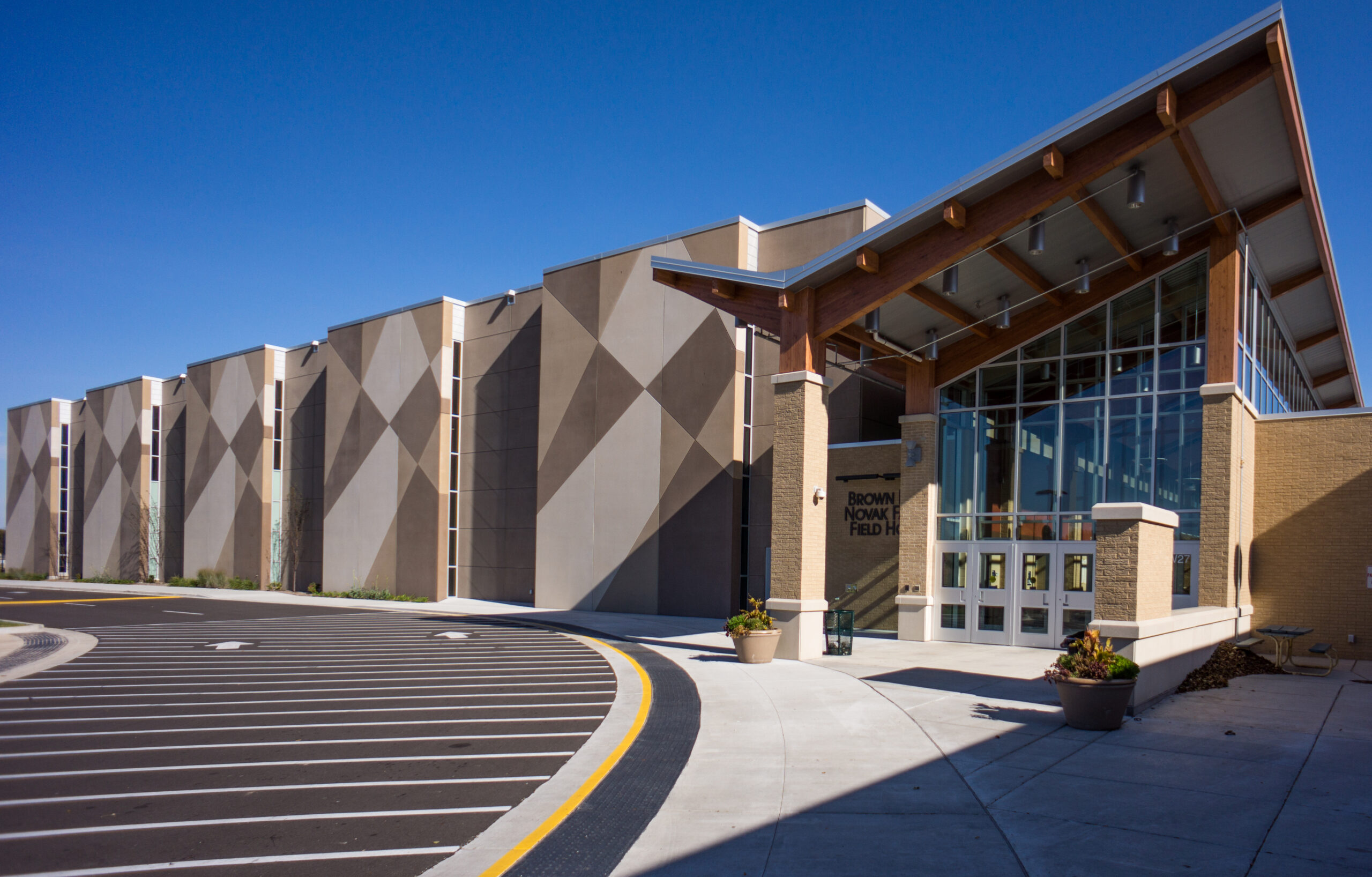
Brown Deer High School

It is in the Brown Deer School District.

Algonquin Elementary School was formerly located on N. 47th Street. It served kindergarten through 2nd grade until it was closed in 2007.

In 2007, the Brown Deer Schools merged Algonquin into Dean Elementary School (which formerly taught only K4 to 4th grade).

Dean Elementary School was formerly located on N. 55th Street. It served kindergarten through sixth graders but was closed and torn down in 2013. The school, now called Brown Deer Elementary School, serves K4–5th grade.

The former Brown Deer Middle School (6th to 8th grades) and Brown Deer High School (9th to 12th grades) were merged in 2013, so the school now serves 6th–12th grades.

Brown Deer Middle School/High School and Brown Deer Elementary School are located on N. 60th Street. Enrollment is about 1600 students in grades K through 12.

== Notable people ==
- Zack Baun, NFL linebacker
- Bruce Froemming, MLB umpire
- Dan Harmon, comedian and writer
- Steve Novak, basketball player for the Milwaukee Bucks
- Gareth Reynolds, comedian and podcaster
- Ervin Schneeberg, businessman and member of the Wisconsin State Assembly, born in Brown Deer
- Lindsay Peoples Wagner, journalist and editor
