= Raymond Lee Lathan =

American politician

Member of the Wisconsin State Assembly from the Milwaukee 13th district
- In office January 7, 1963 – January 4, 1965
- Preceded by: Ervin Mueller
- Succeeded by: Ronald G. Parys

Personal details
- Born: April 4, 1915 Birmingham, Alabama, U.S.
- Died: May 29, 1996 (aged 81) Milwaukee, Wisconsin, U.S.
- Party: Democratic
- Education: Selma University; Detroit Baptist Theological Seminary
- Occupation: Politician, Pastor

Raymond Lee Lathan (1915–1996) was an American politician who served in the Wisconsin State Assembly.

== Biography ==
Lathan was born on April 4, 1915, in Birmingham, Alabama. He graduated from Industrial High School before attending theological seminary. He graduated from Selma University Theological Seminary and from Detroit School of Ministry. Lathan was pastor of New Hope Baptist Church in Milwaukee and was involved in the Civil Rights Movement. He died on May 29, 1996, in Milwaukee, Wisconsin.

== Career ==
Lathan was elected to the Assembly in 1962. He was a Democrat.
