= Joseph P. Graw =

American businessman and politician (1915–2018)

Joseph Graw

Member of the Minnesota House of Representatives
- In office 1963–1974

Personal details
- Born: Joseph Peter Graw; August 8, 1915 Knoxville, Iowa, U.S.
- Died: August 29, 2018 (aged 103) Bloomington, Minnesota, U.S.

Military service
- Branch/service: United States Army
- Battles/wars: World War II

Joseph Peter Graw (August 8, 1915 – August 29, 2018) was an American businessman and politician who served in the Minnesota House of Representatives from 1963 to 1974. Graw also worked in the real estate and insurance business.

== Early life and education ==
Graw was born in Knoxville, Iowa. He graduated from Messmer High School in Milwaukee, Wisconsin. He attended Chicago Technical College and Northwestern University. Graw served in the United States Army during World War II and was commissioned a captain.

== Personal life ==
Graw has three children. He died in Bloomington, Minnesota, on August 29, 2018, at the age of 103.
