= Carl Koenig =

American politician

Carl Koenig was a member of the Wisconsin State Assembly.

== Biography ==
A German emigrant, Koenig was born on March 10, 1864. He would become a Lutheran church elder.

== Assembly career ==
Koenig was elected to the Assembly in 1920, 1924 and 1926. He was a Republican.
