= Marlin Schneider =

American Democratic politician (b. 1942)

Marlin D. Schneider

Member of the Wisconsin State Assembly
- In office January 7, 1985 – January 3, 2011
- Preceded by: Mary Panzer
- Succeeded by: Scott Krug
- Constituency: 72nd district
- In office January 3, 1983 – January 7, 1985
- Preceded by: Calvin Potter
- Succeeded by: Dwight A. York
- Constituency: 59th district
- In office January 1, 1973 – January 3, 1983
- Preceded by: District established
- Succeeded by: David Travis
- Constituency: 93rd district
- In office January 4, 1971 – January 1, 1973
- Preceded by: Harvey F. Gee
- Succeeded by: District abolished
- Constituency: Wood 2nd district

Personal details
- Born: November 16, 1942 (age 83) La Crosse, Wisconsin
- Party: Democratic
- Spouse(s): widowed, re-married
- Education: Wisconsin State University–La Crosse (B.S.); University of Wisconsin–Stevens Point (M.S.T.); University of Wisconsin–Madison (M.S.)
- Profession: educator
- Website: Archived official website
- Nickname: "Snarlin' Marlin"

Marlin D. Schneider (born November 16, 1942) is a retired American educator and Democratic politician. He served 40 years in the Wisconsin State Assembly (1971–2011), representing Wisconsin Rapids and neighboring parts of central Wisconsin. He is also known by his nickname: "Snarlin' Marlin."

== Early life and education ==
Born in La Crosse, Wisconsin, he graduated from La Crosse Central High School in 1960. He earned his bachelor's degree in 1965 at the University of Wisconsin–La Crosse, then known as "Wisconsin State University–La Crosse." He went to work as a social studies and history teacher at Lincoln High School in Wisconsin Rapids and joined the Wisconsin Education Association teachers' union. He also continued graduate studies during the summers at University of Wisconsin–Oshkosh (1966), University of Wisconsin–Platteville (1967), University of Wisconsin–Stevens Point (1968 & 1969), and Louisiana State University (1970) with a social sciences grant from the National Science Foundation. He ultimately received his master's degree in teaching from the University of Wisconsin–Stevens Point in 1976, and earned another master's degree from the University of Wisconsin–Madison in 1979. He also received a police academy certificate from the Madison Area Technical College in 1982.

== Political career ==
While studying at La Crosse, Schneider was a leader of the La Crosse Young Democrats. Through the activities of the teachers' union, Schneider became more involved with the Democratic Party of Wisconsin. In 1970, he was elected president of the local branch of the Wisconsin Education Association, and, a few months later, announced his candidacy for Wisconsin State Assembly. Schneider challenged incumbent Republican Harvey F. Gee. The protests against the Vietnam War on the University of Wisconsin campus were a major issue in the election. Schneider rebuked Gee for referring to the student protesters as "idiots," saying, "It may be popular to slander college students, but this kind of rhetoric doesn't help to heal the wounds of our society." He also went on the offensive against state Republicans, saying that, despite controlling all branches of government and the University Board of Regents, they had failed to deal with the campus issues in a way that restored peace, saying, "It seems ironic that while they talk about law and order, they have achieved so little of it." Schneider narrowly defeated Gee in the November general election, taking 50.7% of the vote.

He went on to win reelection 19 times. He was defeated in the Republican wave election of 2010 by Scott Krug, ending a 40-year run in the Wisconsin State Assembly.
