= Gary Johnson (Wisconsin politician) =

American politician (1939–2008)

Gary K. Johnson

Majority Leader of the Wisconsin Assembly
- In office January 26, 1980 – January 7, 1985
- Preceded by: James W. Wahner
- Succeeded by: Dismas Becker

Member of the Wisconsin State Assembly
- In office January 3, 1983 – January 7, 1985
- Preceded by: Barbara Ulichny
- Succeeded by: Vernon W. Holschbach
- Constituency: 25th district
- In office January 1, 1973 – January 3, 1983
- Preceded by: District created
- Succeeded by: Robert Quackenbush
- Constituency: 45th district
- In office January 4, 1971 – January 1, 1973
- Preceded by: George B. Belting
- Succeeded by: District abolished
- Constituency: Rock 3rd district

Personal details
- Born: September 14, 1939 Grand Forks, North Dakota, U.S.
- Died: August 8, 2008 (aged 68) Madison, Wisconsin, U.S.
- Party: Democratic
- Spouse: Heather
- Children: 3
- Education: Beloit College (B.A.)

Gary K. Johnson (September 14, 1939 – August 8, 2008) was an American educator and Democratic politician. He served 14 years in the Wisconsin State Assembly, representing southern Rock County, and was majority leader from 1980 until 1985. After leaving the Assembly, he worked for a time as Assistant Superintendent in the Wisconsin Department of Public Instruction.

== Early life and career ==
Born in Grand Forks, North Dakota, he moved to Beloit, Wisconsin, with his family as a child. He graduated from Beloit Memorial High School and went on to earn his bachelor's degree from Beloit College in 1963. Afterwards, he went back to Beloit Memorial High School as a social studies teacher. Through his work as an educator, he became involved in the Beloit Education Association, the local branch of the Wisconsin Education Association labor union, and would become president of the local organization.

== Public career ==
In 1970, Johnson was elected to the Wisconsin State Assembly in Rock County's 3rd district, defeating incumbent Republican George B. Belting. He was subsequently reelected 7 times, serving until 1985.

In 1980, Democratic Assembly Majority Leader James W. Wahner announced he would resign from the Assembly in order to accept an appointment in the federal government. Johnson, considered a moderate, was elected the new majority leader on the 2nd ballot, defeating Thomas A. Loftus (of the liberal wing) and Thomas A. Hauke (conservative). He remained majority leader until leaving the Assembly in 1985.

After leaving the Assembly, he worked briefly as a lobbyist for Wisconsin Bell, but, in 1986, accepted appointment as Assistant Superintendent in the Wisconsin Department of Public Instruction, under Superintendent Herbert J. Grover. He left government service again in 1990, and worked as a lobbyist until retiring in 1996.

== Personal life ==
Johnson and his wife, Heather, had three children together. He died at his home in Madison, Wisconsin, in August 2008.

Wisconsin State Assembly
Preceded by George B. Belting	Member of the Wisconsin State Assembly from the Rock 3rd district January 4, 1971 – January 1, 1973	District abolished
District created	Member of the Wisconsin State Assembly from the 45th district January 1, 1973 – January 3, 1983	Succeeded by Robert Quackenbush
Preceded by Barbara Ulichny	Member of the Wisconsin State Assembly from the 25th district January 3, 1983 – January 7, 1985	Succeeded by Vernon W. Holschbach
Preceded by James W. Wahner	Majority Leader of the Wisconsin Assembly; January 26, 1980 – January 7, 1985	Succeeded by Dismas Becker
