= Russel R. Weisensel =

American politician

Russel R. Weisensel (December 23, 1931 – January 5, 2013) was a member of the Wisconsin State Assembly.

== Biography ==
Weisensel was born on December 23, 1931, in Columbus, Wisconsin. He attended the University of Wisconsin-Extension program. While in the Wisconsin State Assembly, Weisensel supported bills for the disabled. He became a wheelchair user as a result of a farm accident on October 7, 1961. Weisensel died on January 5, 2013, at St. Mary's Hospital in Madison, Wisconsin.

== Career ==
Weisensel was elected to the Wisconsin State Assembly in November 1966 as a Republican, when he defeated Democrat Paul Villar and Jerome L. Blaska, who ran as an Independent. In November 1968, he defeated Democrat Harland E. Everson to retain his seat. In November 1970, he lost to Harland E. Everson, thus ending his career in the State Assembly.

He worked for the Wisconsin Agribusiness Council and served as its First Executive Director until his retirement in 2000. Weisensel was a lifelong agricultural champion. As an advocate for physically and mentally handicapped persons he established groundbreaking accommodations and services. Weisensel was recognized as the Wisconsin Handicapped Person of the Year in 1968; the University of Wisconsin–River Falls Honorary Recognition in 1993; and the University of Wisconsin–Madison Honorary Recognition in 1997.

Weisensel's wife Mary (née: Devine) ran for the Wisconsin State Assembly as a Republican in November 1980, however she was defeated by Democratic incumbent, Thomas A. Loftus.

== Other ==
On May 20, 2009, a road was named in their honor in the Town of Bristol, Dane County, Wisconsin. The road, named Russ & Mary Court, is located off Twin Lane Road, just south of Hwy. 151.
