= Harout O. Sanasarian =

20th century American politician

Member of the Wisconsin State Assembly
- In office January 1, 1973 – January 3, 1977
- Preceded by: District established
- Succeeded by: Stephen R. Leopold
- Constituency: 26th Assembly district
- In office January 6, 1969 – January 1, 1973
- Preceded by: Frank E. Schaeffer Jr.
- Succeeded by: District abolished
- Constituency: Milwaukee 4th district

Personal details
- Born: March 31, 1929 (age 97) Baghdad, Mandatory Iraq
- Party: Democratic
- Spouse: Joy A. Draak (died 2002)
- Children: 2
- Education: Milwaukee School of Engineering; University of Wisconsin–Milwaukee
- Occupation: Teacher

Harout O. Sanasarian (March 31, 1929 – November 11, 2015) was an Armenian American immigrant, teacher, and Democratic politician from Milwaukee, Wisconsin. He served four terms in the Wisconsin State Assembly, representing central Milwaukee from 1969 to 1977. He later served more than a decade as a member of the Milwaukee County board of supervisors.

== Early life and education ==
Sanasarian was born on March 31, 1929, in Baghdad to Armenian parents. As a child, he emigrated to the United States with his parents, settling in Milwaukee, Wisconsin. He graduated from Milwaukee's Union High School, then went on to attend the Milwaukee School of Engineering and the University of Wisconsin–Milwaukee, earning his bachelor's degree in political science in 1961.

== Political career ==
After obtaining his degree, Sanasarian went to work as a civics teacher in the Milwaukee Public Schools. As a teacher, he became active in the local teachers' union, the Milwaukee Teachers' Education Association, and through the union became active in politics with the Democratic Party of Wisconsin. He was first elected to the Assembly in 1968, running on the Democratic Party ticket in what was then Milwaukee County's 4th Assembly district. During his first term, state senator Norman Sussman died in office and a special election was held to fill the remainder of his term. Sanasarian ran in the Democratic primary, but fell 111 votes short of fellow state representative Ronald G. Parys. He was subsequently re-elected to his Assembly seat in 1970. After the major redistricting act in 1972, Sanasarian won two more terms—in 1972 and 1974—running in the new 26th State Assembly district.

While in office, he also served as an at-large delegate from Wisconsin to the 1972 Democratic National Convention.

In 1975, Sanasarian announced that he would run for election to the Milwaukee County board of supervisors rather than seeking another term in the Assembly, saying the job would allow him to remain closer to home. Around this same time, Sanasarian became an early supporter of Jimmy Carter's 1976 presidential campaign. He was appointed chairman of Carter's Wisconsin operation, at a time when most of the state's Democratic operation was supporting Mo Udall. Critically, he fought to have Carter's name listed as "Jimmy Carter" on the primary ballot, when state party Democrats tried to list him as "James E. Carter". After enlisting the support of Republican state elections board chair James Klauser and state attorney general Bronson La Follette, Sanasarian prevailed in his battle over Carter's ballot listing, and Carter went on to narrowly defeat Udall in the Wisconsin primary, setting him on course for the Democratic nomination. Sanasarian was back to work for Carter in the 1976 general election, helping Carter to a narrow victory over incumbent president Gerald Ford.

Two years later, Sanasarian entered the race for Lieutenant Governor of Wisconsin. Ultimately six other candidates entered the race. Sanasarian came in a distant 3rd, receiving just 12% of the vote. Sanasarian ultimately remained on the Milwaukee County board of supervisors for more than a decade. He was active in the Jimmy Carter's re-election campaign in 1980, served on the rules committee at the 1980 Democratic National Convention, and opposed Ted Kennedy's primary challenge.

== Personal life and family ==
Sanasarian married Joy A. Draak. Mrs. Sanasarian worked for 30 years as a librarian for the Milwaukee Journal Sentinel. They had two children and retired in 1991 to Florida, where she died in 2002. Sanasarian subsequently moved to Soddy-Daisy, Tennessee. He died on November 11, 2025.

== Electoral history ==
=== Wisconsin Assembly, Milwaukee 4th district (1968, 1970) ===
Year	Election	Date	Elected				Defeated				Total	Plurality
1968	Primary	Sep. 10	Harout Sanasarian	Democratic	885	51.45%	Frank E. Schaeffer Jr. (inc)	Dem.	577	33.55%	1,720	308
1968	Primary	Sep. 10	Harout Sanasarian	Democratic	885	51.45%	Ronald A. Kuisis	Dem.	258	15.00%	1,720	308
1968	General	Nov. 5	Harout Sanasarian	Democratic	3,957	59.41%	William P. McGovern	Rep.	2,703	40.59%	6,660	1,254
1970	General	Nov. 3	Harout Sanasarian (inc)	Democratic	8,908	88.05%	John L. Maier	Rep.	1,209	11.95%	10,117	7,699

=== Wisconsin Senate (1969) ===
Wisconsin Senate, 9th District Special Election, 1969
Party	Candidate	Votes	%	±%
Special Democratic Primary, September 9, 1969
Democratic	Ronald G. Parys	2,112	44.78%	
Democratic	Harout O. Sanasarian	2,001	39.08%	
Democratic	Richard B. Mackey	403	7.87%	
Democratic	Minnie Townsend	351	6.86%	
Democratic	Fred A. Hardy	253	4.94%	
Plurality		111	2.17%	
Total votes		5,120	100.0%	

=== Wisconsin Assembly, 26th district (1972, 1974) ===
Year	Election	Date	Elected				Defeated				Total	Plurality
1972	General	Nov. 7	Harout Sanasarian	Democratic	8,891	70.63%	Leonora L. Von Sehlen	Rep.	3,467	27.54%	12,589	5,424
1972	General	Nov. 7	Harout Sanasarian	Democratic	8,891	70.63%	Roy Vallarta	Amer.	231	1.83%	12,589	5,424
1974	General	Nov. 5	Harout Sanasarian (inc)	Democratic	4,416	100.0%					4,416	4,416

=== Wisconsin Lieutenant Governor (1978) ===
Wisconsin Lieutenant Gubernatorial Election, 1978
Party	Candidate	Votes	%	±%
Democratic Primary, September 12, 1978
Democratic	Doug La Follette	151,366	44.78%	
Democratic	Dale McKenna	47,257	13.98%	
Democratic	Harout O. Sanasarian	40,268	11.91%	
Democratic	Paul Offner	40,008	11.84%	
Democratic	Robert A. Anderson	21,230	6.28%	
Democratic	Charles E. Smith	19,504	5.77%	
Democratic	Monroe Swan	18,392	5.44%	
Plurality		104,109	30.80%	-41.51pp
Total votes		338,025	100.0%	+2.59%

Wisconsin State Assembly
Preceded by Frank E. Schaeffer Jr.	Member of the Wisconsin State Assembly from the Milwaukee 4th district January 6, 1969 – January 1, 1973	District abolished
District established by 1971 Wis. Act 304	Member of the Wisconsin State Assembly from the 26th district January 1, 1973 – January 3, 1977	Succeeded by Stephen R. Leopold
