= Black Hawk, Wisconsin =

- Unincorporated community
- Location within Wisconsin Location within the United States
- Coordinates: 43°16′09″N 89°55′38″W
- Country: United States
- State: Wisconsin
- County: Sauk
- Elevation: 778 ft (237 m)
- Time zone: UTC-6 (Central (CST))
  - Summer (DST): UTC-5 (CDT)
- Area code: 608
- GNIS feature ID: 1561864

Black Hawk is an unincorporated community in the town of Troy, Sauk County, Wisconsin, United States. Black Hawk is located on County Highway C 5.9 miles (9.5 km) east of Plain.

== History ==
A post office called Black Hawk was established in 1866, and remained in operation until 1906. The community was named after Black Hawk (1767–1838), Sauk and Fox leader.
