= Gregor J. Bock =

American politician

Gregor J. Bock (November 2, 1907 – October 17, 1991) was a member of the Wisconsin State Assembly.

== Biography ==
Bock was born on November 2, 1907, in Muscoda, Wisconsin. He attended the University of Wisconsin–Madison. Bock later became Fire Chief of Highland, Iowa County, Wisconsin and Deputy Sheriff of Iowa County, Wisconsin. He was a member of the Knights of Columbus. He died on October 17, 1991.

== Political career ==
Bock was elected to the Assembly in 1964 and re-elected in 1966 and 1968. Bock sought a fourth term in 1970, but was defeated by Phil Leyda in the party's nomination, and his seat ultimately went to the Democratic candidate, Joanne M. Duren. Previously, he was mayor of Highland and president of the Highland School Board from 1939 to 1943, and postmaster of Highland from 1941 to 1951. He was a Republican.
