= John W. Slaby =

American lawyer and politician

John William Slaby (September 23, 1934 – January 3, 2017) was an American lawyer and politician. He was a member of the Wisconsin State Assembly.

Slaby was born in Ashland, Wisconsin. He graduated from University of Wisconsin–Madison, in 1956, and received his law degree from University of Wisconsin Law School in 1958. He practiced law in Phillips, Wisconsin. Slaby served as district attorney for Price County, Wisconsin from 1960 to 1971 and was a Democrat. Slaby served in the Wisconsin State Assembly in 1971 and 1972. He died in Naples, Florida.
