= Jerry J. Wing =

American businessman and politician

Jerry J. Wing (June 21, 1923 – July 18, 1994) was an American businessman and politician.

Born in Appleton, Wisconsin, Wing served in the United States Army Air Forces during World War II. He was President of the W.B. Bottle Supply Company in Milwaukee, Wisconsin, retiring in 1988. In 1969, Wing served in the Wisconsin State Assembly as a Republican. He cast a key vote on the state budget that year after previously siding with the Democrats to stall the measure. Later, Wing became an Independent. He had lived in West Allis, Wisconsin. He died in Naples, Florida.
