= Jon R. Guiles =

American politician

Jon R. Guiles (born January 30, 1945) is an American lawyer and politician. He was a member of the Wisconsin State Assembly.

Born in Platteville, Wisconsin, Guiles received his bachelor's degree in economics from University of Wisconsin–Madison and his Juris Doctor degree from University of Wisconsin Law School. He practiced law in Oshkosh, Wisconsin. In 1971, he served in the Wisconsin State Assembly as a Republican.
