= James D. Swan =

American politician

James D. Swan (February 20, 1903 – June 25, 1977) was a vegetable farmer from Walworth County, Wisconsin, who served two terms as a Republican member of the Wisconsin State Senate.

== Background ==
Swan was born in Neosho Falls, Kansas, on February 20, 1903. He graduated from New Trier High School in Winnetka, Illinois, and earned a Bachelor of Science degree from Princeton University in 1925. He became a farmer, and served as President of the Wisconsin Potato and Vegetable Growers Association and of the Vegetable Growers Association of America.

== Public office ==
Swan had served as a member of his local school board and from 1937 to 1952 of his county drainage board. He was first elected to the senate in an October 1967 special election to replace fellow Republican George M. Borg (who had resigned), and was reelected in 1970. In 1974, he was defeated for re-election by Democrat Timothy Cullen.

== Death ==
Swan died June 25, 1977, in Madison.
