= Lewis T. Mittness =

20th century American politician

Sergeant-at-Arms of the Wisconsin State Assembly
- In office January 5, 1981 – January 7, 1985
- Preceded by: Joseph E. Jones
- Succeeded by: Patrick Essie

Member of the Wisconsin State Assembly
- In office January 1, 1973 – December 11, 1975
- Preceded by: District established
- Succeeded by: Wayne W. Wood
- Constituency: 48th district
- In office January 4, 1965 – January 1, 1973
- Preceded by: William Merriam
- Succeeded by: District abolished
- Constituency: Rock 1st district

Personal details
- Born: July 29, 1929 La Crosse, Wisconsin
- Died: May 27, 2006 (aged 76) Janesville, Wisconsin
- Party: Democratic
- Profession: Real estate agent

Lewis T. Mittness Jr. (July 29, 1929 – May 27, 2006) was a former member of the Wisconsin State Assembly.

== Biography ==
Mittness was born on July 29, 1929, in La Crosse, Wisconsin. He graduated from high school in Tomah, Wisconsin before attending the University of Wisconsin–La Crosse. He then received his bachelor's degree from the University of Wisconsin–Stevens Point and his master's degree from the University of Wisconsin–Madison. During the Korean War, he served in the United States Army. Mittness was in the real estate business. He resigned from the Assembly to become executive secretary of the Wisconsin Public Service Commission serving from 1975 to 1980. He then served as sergeant at arms in the Wisconsin Assembly from 1981 to 1984. He died in Janesville, Wisconsin on May 27, 2006.

== Political career ==
Mittness was a member of the Assembly from January 1965 to December 1975. He was a Democrat.
