= John Parkin (Wisconsin politician) =

American businessman and politician

Member of the Wisconsin State Assembly from the 1st Wood County district
- In office January 6, 1969 – January 4, 1971
- Preceded by: Raymond F. Heinzen
- Succeeded by: John Oestreicher

Personal details
- Born: April 10, 1918 Rochester, Minnesota
- Died: June 4, 2003 (aged 85) Atlanta, Georgia
- Party: Republican
- Education: University of Minnesota

John Wilbur Parkin (April 10, 1918 – June 4, 2003) was an American businessman and politician.

== Biography ==
Parkin was born on April 10, 1918, in Rochester, Minnesota, and went to Rochester High School. He went to University of Minnesota. Parkin moved to Marshfield, Wisconsin, and was involved in his family business: the Parkin Ice Cream Company. He served on the Wood County, Wisconsin Board of Supervisors and was chairman of the county board. He served in the Wisconsin Assembly in 1969 and 1970 and was a Republican. Parkin moved to Atlanta, Georgia and lived at King's Bridge Retirement Community. He died in Atlanta, Georgia.
