= William A. Johnson (Wisconsin politician) =

American politician (1922–1977)

Member of the Wisconsin State Assembly from the Milwaukee 7th district
- In office May 11, 1965 – March 15, 1972
- Preceded by: Allen J. Flannigan
- Succeeded by: District abolished

Personal details
- Born: February 3, 1922 Michigamme, Michigan, U.S.
- Died: June 8, 1977 (aged 55) Stoughton, Wisconsin, U.S.
- Cause of death: Heart attack
- Resting place: Lutheran East Cemetery, Stoughton
- Party: Democratic
- Spouse: Loraine Opalewski (m. 1942–1977)
- Children: 5

Military service
- Allegiance: United States
- Branch/service: United States Navy
- Years of service: 1943–1945
- Rank: Petty Officer 1st Class, USN
- Battles/wars: World War II

William Alfred Johnson (February 3, 1922 – June 8, 1977) was an American machinist, union leader, and Democratic politician from Milwaukee, Wisconsin. He served seven years in the Wisconsin State Assembly, from 1965 to 1972, and served the last five years of his life as a member of the Wisconsin Industry, Labor and Human Relations Commission. Prior to serving in public office, he was president of United Auto Workers Local 248 in Milwaukee.

== Biography ==
William A. Johnson was born February 3, 1922, in Michigamme, Michigan. As a child, he moved with his parents to Milwaukee, Wisconsin, where he was raised and educated. He graduated from Milwaukee's Riverside University High School in 1940. He enlisted in the United States Navy after the outbreak of World War II and rose to the rank of petty officer first class as a weapons technician.

After the war, he returned to Milwaukee and was employed as a machinist at the Allis-Chalmers plant. Through his work, he became a member of the United Auto Workers labor union and rose to become president of UAW Local 248 from 1959 to 1961. As president, he pursued disciplinary fines against several workers who had crossed a picket line during a 1959 strike. He became vice president of the Milwaukee County Labor Council and sat on the state advisory committee on workmen's compensation.

When incumbent state representative Allen J. Flannigan died at the start of the 1965 legislative term, Johnson jumped into the race to replace him. With labor support, Johnson secured the Democratic Party nomination over four competitors, taking 44% of the vote. He went on to win 71% of the vote in a low-turnout victory in the May 1965 special election over perennial Republican candidate, attorney Leon J. Dealy.

Johnson won re-election three times, and became chairman of the Assembly labor committee in the 1971 session. He resigned in the spring of 1972 to accept appointment from Governor Patrick Lucey to the state Industry, Labor and Human Relations Commission. He was reappointed by Lucey in 1975, and ultimately served on the commission until his death.

He died at his home in Stoughton, Wisconsin, of a heart attack, on June 8, 1977.

== Personal life and family ==
William Johnson married Loraine Opalewski in 1942. They had five children together.

== Electoral history ==
=== Wisconsin Assembly (1965, 1966, 1968, 1970) ===
Year	Election	Date	Elected				Defeated				Total	Plurality
1965	Primary	Apr. 6	William A. Johnson	Democratic	1,419	43.66%	William P. Keppler	Dem.	902	27.75%	3,250	517
1965	Primary	Apr. 6	William A. Johnson	Democratic	1,419	43.66%	John Schaller	Dem.	391	12.03%	3,250	517
1965	Primary	Apr. 6	William A. Johnson	Democratic	1,419	43.66%	Dale A. Anderson	Dem.	346	10.65%	3,250	517
1965	Primary	Apr. 6	William A. Johnson	Democratic	1,419	43.66%	Thomas J. Higgins	Dem.	192	5.91%	3,250	517
1965	Special	May 4	William A. Johnson	Democratic	1,500	71.50%	Leon J. Dealy	Rep.	598	28.50%	2,098	902
1966	General	Nov. 8	William A. Johnson (inc)	Democratic	4,381	76.50%	Leon J. Dealy	Rep.	1,346	23.50%	5,727	3,035
1968	General	Nov. 5	William A. Johnson (inc)	Democratic	6,222	79.81%	Leon J. Dealy	Rep.	1,574	20.19%	7,796	4,648
1970	General	Nov. 3	William A. Johnson (inc)	Democratic	3,802	81.80%	James LeRoy	Rep.	846	18.20%	4,648	2,956

Wisconsin State Assembly
Preceded by Allen J. Flannigan	Member of the Wisconsin State Assembly from the Milwaukee 7th district May 11, 1965 – March 15, 1972	District abolished
