= Ervin Schneeberg =

American businessman and politician

Ervin Schneeberg (April 7, 1919 – June 12, 1995) was an American businessman and politician.

Born in Brown Deer, Wisconsin, Schneeberg graduated from Custer High School and attended the University of Wisconsin–Milwaukee. He owned an insurance business and was in real estate. He served as town clerk of the town of Granville, Wisconsin. He then helped with the incorporation of the village of Brown Deer from part of the town of Granville and served as village clerk and village manager of the village of Brown Deer, Wisconsin. He also served on the Brown Deer School Board. He served in the Wisconsin State Assembly in 1969 as a Republican. He died in Brown Deer, Wisconsin.
