= Robert M. Boche =

American politician

Robert M. Boche (February 21, 1921 - November 25, 2004) was a member of the Wisconsin State Assembly.

== Biography ==
Boche was born on February 21, 1921, in Rosemount, Minnesota. He graduated from Rosemount High School before attending Globe University/Minnesota School of Business. Boche moved to New Richmond, Wisconsin and became active in his local church, as well as the United Packinghouse Workers of America and the International Red Cross and Red Crescent Movement.

== Career ==
Boche was elected to the Assembly in 1966 and was re-elected in 1968. He is a Republican.
