= Wesley L. Packard =

American politician

Wesley Lavern Packard (February 6, 1918 – September 25, 1972) was a member of the Wisconsin State Assembly.

== Biography ==
Packard was born on February 6, 1918, in Coffee Creek, Montana. He graduated from Poynette High School in Poynette, Wisconsin before attending the Reppert School of Auctioneering. During World War II, he served in the United States Army. He died on September 25, 1972.

== Political career ==
Packard was elected to the Assembly in 1966 and 1968. In addition, he was mayor of Lodi, Wisconsin from 1948 to 1952, as well as assessor of Lodi from 1959 to 1969. He was a Republican.
