= Eugene Oberle =

American politician

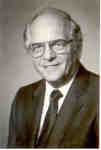
Eugene Oberle

Eugene William "Gene" Oberle (April 9, 1929 – May 24, 2010) was an American farmer and politician.

Born in Thorp, Wisconsin, Oberle served in the United States Navy from 1951 to 1955. He then owned and operated a dairy farm. He served in the Wisconsin State Assembly as a Democrat from 1971 to 1975. He then served as Register of Deeds for Clark County, Wisconsin from 1985 to 1999. He died in Eau Claire, Wisconsin.
