= John C. Van Hollen =

American politician (1933–2025)

John C. Van Hollen (June 27, 1933 – January 30, 2025) was a Wisconsin businessman and politician.

Born in Rhinelander, Wisconsin, he grew up in Chetek, Wisconsin. He served in the United States military during the Korean War and graduated from University of Wisconsin.

Van Hollen served in the Wisconsin State Assembly from 1967 to 1971. He owned a real estate business in Northern Wisconsin. His son, J. B. Van Hollen, served as Wisconsin Attorney General from 2007 to 2015. He died on January 30, 2025, in Titusville, Florida.

Wisconsin State Assembly
Preceded by Fred J. Moser	Member of the Wisconsin State Assembly from the Barron-Washburn district 1967–1971	Succeeded by Kenneth M. Schricker
