= Lawrence J. Kafka =

American politician

Lawrence J. Kafka (March 16, 1898 – August 3, 1977) was a member of the Wisconsin State Assembly.

== Biography ==
Kafka was born on March 16, 1898, in New Denmark, Wisconsin. He died on August 3, 1977.

== Career ==
Kafka defeated Alexander R. Grant in the 1964 Republican primary and then served as a member of the assembly from 1965 to 1972. In addition, he served as supervisor and chairman of New Denmark and a member and chairman of the Brown County, Wisconsin Board. He was a Republican.
