= Harvey F. Gee =

American politician (1908–1984)

Harvey F. Gee (1908-1984) was a member of the Wisconsin State Assembly.

== Biography ==
Gee was born on February 29, 1908, in Wisconsin Rapids, Wisconsin. He graduated from Rollins College. During World War II, he served in the United States Army. He died on January 5, 1984, at Riverside Hospital in Wisconsin Rapids, Wisconsin after a long illness.

== Political career ==
Gee was first elected to the Assembly in 1960. Additionally, he was a member of the Wood County, Wisconsin Board of Supervisors from 1938 to 1960. He was a Republican.
