= Harland E. Everson =

American politician (1917–1992)

Harland E. Everson (July 16, 1917 in Vernon County, Wisconsin – September 11, 1992) was a member of the Wisconsin State Assembly.

After graduating from Sparta High School in Sparta, Wisconsin, he attended George Washington University and the University of Wisconsin–Madison. He owned and operated the Edgerton Reporter. Everson died from an aneurysm at age 75.

== Career ==
Everson was elected to the Assembly in 1970. Additionally, he was a member of the Edgerton, Wisconsin Board of Education from 1970 to 1971. He was a Democrat.
