= Louis V. Mato =

American politician and businessman (1903–1989)

Louis V. Mato (July 20, 1903 – June 9, 1989) was an American politician and businessman.

Born in Pogradec then part of the Ottoman Empire, Mato went to school in Albania. He went to business school in Red Wing, Minnesota. Mato lived in Fairchild, Wisconsin. He sold chef supplies and owned a restaurant. He served on the Eau Claire County, Wisconsin Board of Supervisors and was the vice chairman. From 1963 to 1971, he served in the Wisconsin State Assembly and was a Democrat.
