= Donald K. Helgeson =

American politician

Donald K. Helgeson was a member of the Wisconsin State Assembly.

== Biography ==
Helgeson was born on May 30, 1932, in Manitowoc, Wisconsin. He graduated from high school in Valders, Wisconsin and from the University of Wisconsin-Madison. During the Korean War, he served in the United States Navy. Helgeson died in 1976.

== Political career ==
Helgeson was elected to the Assembly in 1968 and re-elected in 1970. He was a Republican.
