= Paul Sicula =

American lawyer and politician

Member of the Wisconsin State Assembly
- In office 1967–1977

Personal details
- Born: Paul E. Sicula; January 31, 1939 Milwaukee, Wisconsin, U.S.
- Died: March 17, 2017 (aged 78)
- Party: Democratic
- Education: Washington High School; University of Wisconsin–Madison
- Occupation: Politician, lawyer

Military service
- Allegiance: United States
- Branch/service: United States Army
- Battles/wars: Vietnam War

Paul E. Sicula (January 31, 1939 – March 17, 2017) was an American lawyer and politician.

== Biography ==
Sicula was born on January 31, 1939, in Milwaukee, Wisconsin. After graduating from Washington High School, Sicula graduated from the University of Wisconsin–Madison in 1962 and then received his law degree from the University of Wisconsin Law School. He then practiced law. During the Vietnam War, he served in the United States Army Reserve. Sicula died on March 17, 2017.

== Political career ==
Sicula was first elected to the Wisconsin State Assembly in 1966 and served from 1967 to 1977. He was a Democrat.
