= Ervin Conradt =

American politician

Ervin W. Conradt (October 4, 1916 – November 5, 2001) was an American politician and farmer.

Born in Bovina, Wisconsin, Conradt was a farmer. He served in the Town of Bovina as a supervisor and chairman and also on the Outagamie County Board of Supervisors. Conradt was in the Wisconsin State Assembly from 1965 to 1981 as a Republican. Conradt then became Wisconsin State Highway Commissioner. From 1994 to 1996, Conradt was mayor of Seymour, Wisconsin. He died in Appleton, Wisconsin.
