= Clarence J. Wilger =

American politician and conservation warden

Clarence J. Wilger (November 1, 1909 – March 20, 1976) was an American politician and conservation warden.

== Career ==
Born in Neillsville, Wisconsin, Wilger went to the Neillsville public schools. He was a Wisconsin conservation warden and had lived in Elkhorn, Wisconsin. He served in the Wisconsin State Assembly from 1967 to 1971. He was a Republican. He died at his home in rural Elkhorn, Wisconsin.
