= Terry A. Willkom =

American politician

Terry A. Willkom (born February 23, 1943, in Stanley, Wisconsin, died May 16, 2025) was a former member of the Wisconsin State Assembly. He graduated from McDonell Central Catholic High School in Chippewa Falls, Wisconsin and the University of Wisconsin-Eau Claire.

== Career ==
Willkom was a member of the Assembly from 1970 to 1976. Additionally, he was Chairman of the Chippewa County, Wisconsin Democratic Party.
