= Robert L. Jackson Jr. =

American politician

Robert L. Jackson Jr. (born February 20, 1936) is a former member of the Wisconsin State Assembly.

== Biography ==
Jackson was born on February 20, 1936, in Red Wing, Minnesota. After graduating from high school in Grinnell, Iowa, Jackson attended St. Ambrose University and the University of Wisconsin-Madison. He is married with three children.

== Career ==
Jackson was elected to the Assembly in 1968 and 1970. He is a Democrat.
