= William S. Schwefel =

American politician

William S. Schwefel was a member of the Wisconsin State Assembly.

== Biography ==
Schwefel was born on October 5, 1902, in LeRoy, Wisconsin. He attended high school in Brownsville, Wisconsin before attending the University of Wisconsin-Madison. Schwefel died on August 16, 1985.

== Career ==
Schwefel was first elected to the Assembly in 1964. He was a Republican.
