= James Lynn (Wisconsin politician) =

20th century American politician

James J. Lynn (October 12, 1916 – June 13, 2008) was an American businessman and Democratic politician from West Allis, Wisconsin. He served two terms in the Wisconsin State Assembly, representing west-central Milwaukee County.

== Biography ==
Lynn was born on October 12, 1916, in Milwaukee, Wisconsin. He attended Miami High School in Miami, Florida. During World War II, Lynn served in the United States Army. He was a member of the Knights of Columbus. He died on June 13, 2008.

== Political career ==
Lynn was elected to the Assembly in 1968. He was a Democrat.
