= Joseph Sweda =

American politician

Joseph Sweda (January 3, 1926 – April 1, 2015) was an American farmer and politician.

Born in Lublin, Wisconsin, Sweda went to Withee High School and then served in the United States Army Air Forces during World War II. Sweda was a farmer and had a business with his brothers hauling gravel and wood products. He served as chairman of the Roosevelt Town Board, on the Taylor County, Wisconsin Board of Supervisors, on the fire district board, and was a Democrat. Sweda served in the Wisconsin State Assembly from 1963 to 1974. He was appointed Wisconsin Highway Commissioner and later was Wisconsin Transportation Commissioner. Sweda died in Thorp, Wisconsin.
