= Erwin G. Tamms =

American politician

Erwin G. "Bud" Tamms (January 4, 1931 – October 21, 2011) was a member of the Wisconsin State Assembly.

== Biography ==
Tamms was born on January 4, 1931, in Milwaukee, Wisconsin. He attended Washington High School and the University of Wisconsin–Milwaukee. A Lutheran, Tamms served as a Sunday school teacher. He was married with three children. He started Tamms Lithography in 1968. Tamms died on October 21, 2011.

== Career ==
Tamms was elected to the Assembly in 1968. He is a Republican.
