= Jack D. Steinhilber =

American politician

Jack D. Steinhilber (September 14, 1931 – May 14, 2009) was an Oshkosh, Wisconsin lawyer, businessman and Republican politician, who served as Winnebago County district attorney, in the Wisconsin State Assembly, and in the Wisconsin Senate, as well as serving as Winnebago County county executive.

== Biography ==
Son of Elmer and Rose Steinhilber, Steinhilber graduated from Oshkosh High School in 1949, and attended Oshkosh State Teachers College and the University of Wisconsin–Madison, earning a BS in economics; then graduated from the University of Wisconsin Law School.

He practiced law in Oshkosh, and was elected Winnebago County district attorney in 1957, holding the post until 1964. He was elected to the State Assembly in 1966, served two terms, then in 1970 was elected to the State Senate for one term. (His legislative papers (1967–1974) are in the archives of the Wisconsin Historical Society.)

He was a candidate for the Republican nomination for Congressman from Wisconsin's 6th congressional district in the February 20, 1979 special primary, coming in third with 18.68% of the vote behind eventual winner Tom Petri and later Governor Tommy Thompson. He was an active Republican, serving in 1976 as chairman of the Wisconsin Citizens for Reagan and as a delegate to the 1980 Republican National Convention.

In 1993, he was elected Winnebago County executive for one term.

He married Gail Floether July 28, 1984; they had three children.
