= Sam L. Orlich =

American politician

Sam L. Orlich (February 18, 1939 – February 16, 2025) was a former member of the Wisconsin State Assembly.

== Biography ==
Orlich was born on February 18, 1939, in Milwaukee, Wisconsin. He graduated from South Division High School before attending Milwaukee Area Technical College and the University of Wisconsin–Milwaukee. Orlich was married with two children.

== Career ==
Orlich was elected to the Assembly in 1966. He was a Democrat.
