= Ronald G. Parys =

American politician from Wisconsin (1938–2007)

Member of the Wisconsin Senate from the 9th district
- In office October 14, 1969 – January 1, 1979
- Preceded by: Norman Sussman
- Succeeded by: Jim Moody

Member of the Wisconsin State Assembly from the Milwaukee 13th district
- In office January 4, 1965 – October 14, 1969
- Preceded by: Raymond Lee Lathan
- Succeeded by: Glenn E. Bultman

Personal details
- Born: October 7, 1938 Milwaukee, Wisconsin, U.S.
- Died: September 16, 2007 (aged 68) Englewood, Florida, U.S.
- Party: Democratic
- Spouse: Dawne
- Children: 4
- Education: Messmer High School; Riverside University High School
- Occupation: Politician

Military service
- Allegiance: United States
- Branch/service: United States Army (United States Army Reserve)

Ronald G. Parys (October 7, 1938 – September 16, 2007) was an American politician who was a member of the Wisconsin State Assembly and the Wisconsin State Senate.

== Biography ==
Parys was born on October 7, 1938, in Milwaukee, Wisconsin. He attended Messmer High School before graduating from Riverside University High School and served in the United States Army Reserve. Parys was survived by his wife Dawne and four adult children from an earlier marriage. On September 16, 2007, he died at his home in Englewood, Florida.

== Political career ==
Parys served three terms in the Assembly before being elected to the Senate from the 9th district in a special election in 1969. He was a strong advocate for the people of his district, which included some of Milwaukee's poorest neighborhoods. He also supported legalized gambling in the form of a State Lottery and Bingo, arguing that profits from these venues could aid a financially struggling public school system. He was a Democrat.
