= George B. Belting =

American politician

George B. Belting (July 15, 1914 – August 31, 1998) was an American politician. He was a member of the Wisconsin State Assembly.

== Biography ==
Belting was born on July 15, 1914, in De Soto, Wisconsin. He later moved to Beloit, Wisconsin. During World War II, he served in the United States Navy. He graduated from the University of Wisconsin, where he also became a member of the faculty. He died in Saint Petersburg, Florida, on August 31, 1998.

== Political career ==
Belting was a member of the Assembly from 1957 to 1970. He was a Republican.
