= John Q. Radcliffe =

American politician

John Q. Radcliffe (1920 – 2001) was an American politician. He was a member of the Wisconsin State Assembly.

== Biography ==
Radcliffe was born on May 19, 1920, in Little Falls, Wisconsin. He had an eighth grade education. During World War II, he served in the United States Navy aboard the USS Atherton. Radcliffe died on August 19, 2001, and is buried in Unity, Trempealeau County, Wisconsin.

== Political career ==
Radcliffe was elected to the Assembly in 1964. Previously, he was Chairman of the Trempealeau County, Wisconsin Democratic Party from 1961 to 1962. He remained a member of the Assembly until he resigned on January 19, 1971, to become the state's Highway Safety Coordinator.
