= Bernard Lewison =

American politician and businessman

Bernard Lewison (February 7, 1902 – January 13, 1984) was an American politician and businessman.

Born in Viroqua, Wisconsin, Lewison went to Lawrence University. He was a farmer, automobile dealer, body shop owner, saving and loan director, and real estate broker. Lewis served on the Vernon County, Wisconsin Board of Supervisors, the Viroqua Common Council, and was Mayor of Viroqua 1943–1948. Lewison served in the Wisconsin State Assembly 1955–1957, 1961–1981 as a Republican. He died in Madison, Wisconsin.
