= Vernon R. Boeckmann =

American politician

Vernon R. Boeckmann (April 16, 1927 – September 20, 2016) was an American politician.

Born in Sheboygan, Wisconsin, Boeckmann graduated from Plymouth High School in Plymouth, Wisconsin. Boeckmann served in the United States Army from 1945 to 1948. He took an extension course at the University of Wisconsin. Boeckmann served as deputy sheriff of Sheboygan County, Wisconsin. In 1967, Boeckmann served as sheriff of Sheboygan County and was a Democrat. In 1969 and 1971, Boeckmann served in the Wisconsin State Assembly. Again, Boeckmann served as Sheboygan County sheriff and resigned from the office on April 22, 1984.
