= Edward Stack (Wisconsin politician) =

American politician

Edward Stack was a member of the Wisconsin State Assembly.

== Biography ==
Stack was born on August 11, 1918, in Superior, Wisconsin. During World War II, he served in the United States Army. He was a member of the Veterans of Foreign Wars, as wells as the Fraternal Order of the Eagles and the Knights of Columbus. He died on December 31, 2006.

== Political career ==
Stack was elected to the Assembly in 1968. Additionally, he was a member of the Superior Common Council and Supervisor of the Douglas County, Wisconsin Board. He was a Democrat.
