= Laurence J. Day =

American farmer, electrical contractor, and politician

Laurence J. Day (October 18, 1913 – June 26, 1983) was an American farmer, electrical contractor, and politician.

Born in the town of Elderon, Wisconsin, Day went to refrigeration and electrical vocational schools. He was also involved with conservation and agriculture. Day served as clerk for the town of Elderon. He served in the Wisconsin State Assembly 1969–1977, as a Democrat. He died in Marshfield, Wisconsin.
