= Carl Otte =

American politician

Carl Otte (June 24, 1923 – January 13, 2011) was an American Democratic politician and legislator from Wisconsin.

Born in Sheboygan, Wisconsin, Otte served in the United States Army during World War II. Otte worked in a leather company and served on the Sheboygan County, Wisconsin Board of Supervisors. He served in the Wisconsin State Assembly 1967–1983 and then the Wisconsin State Senate 1983–1987.
