= Joanne M. Duren =

American politician (1931–2022)

Joanne M. Duren (October 11, 1931 – November 26, 2022) was an American politician and businesswoman.

Born in Cazenovia, Wisconsin, Duren graduated from Cazenovia High School. In 1950, she graduated from Madison Business College. Duren owned a secretarial service and was secretary for business people and public officials. Duren served as a Democrat in the Wisconsin State Assembly from 1971 to 1983. During the 1983 and 1985 sessions, Duren was the Wisconsin Assembly Chief Clerk.

Duren died on November 26, 2022, in Tucson, Arizona.
