= Oscar A. Laper Jr. =

American politician

Oscar August Laper, Jr. (July 13, 1915 in Markesan, Wisconsin – September 29, 1996 in Baraboo, Wisconsin), was a member of the Wisconsin State Assembly. He graduated from Northwestern College in 1937.

== Career ==
Laper served as president of the Wisconsin Association of Soil Conservation Districts in the 1960s. He was elected to the Assembly in 1966 and was re-elected in 1968. Additionally, he was Treasurer and Chairman of Excelsior, Sauk County, Wisconsin, as well as a member of the school board. He was a Republican.
