= Glenn E. Bultman =

American politician

Glenn E. Bultman is a former member of the Wisconsin State Assembly, United States.

== Biography ==
Bultman was born on December 11, 1940, in Milwaukee, Wisconsin. He graduated from Messmer High School and Marquette University. From 1966 to 1969, he was a member of the United States Army.

== Political career ==
Bultman was elected to the Assembly in 1970. He is a Democrat.
