= Gerald Greider =

American politician

Gerald Arthur Greider (August 30, 1923 – March 20, 1982) was an American Republican politician from Wisconsin.

Born in Greenville, Illinois, Greider was educated in the public schools in La Crosse, Wisconsin. Greider was a businessman and served on the La Crosse Common Council 1966–1968. Greider was vice president and secretary of a bakery in La Crosse. In 1972, he moved to Mason City, Iowa, where he died. Greider served in the Wisconsin State Assembly from 1969 to 1971.
