= Joseph E. Jones =

American politician

Joseph E. Jones (June 29, 1914 – May 8, 2003) was an American Democratic legislator.

Born in Antigo, Wisconsin, Jones went to Bowlby Business College, University of Wisconsin–Madison, Northwest University for Machinist Business College, and was a machinist. He served in the United States Army during World War II and the Korean War. He served in the Wisconsin State Assembly 1963-1971 from Milwaukee, Wisconsin. In 1977, Jones was elected sergeant at arms of the Wisconsin State Assembly. In 1990, Jones served on the Langlade County, Wisconsin Board of Supervisors. He died in Pearson, Wisconsin.
