= John W. Eber =

20th century American politician

51st Speaker of the Wisconsin State Assembly
- In office January 12, 1927 – January 7, 1929
- Preceded by: George A. Nelson
- Succeeded by: Charles B. Perry

Member of the Wisconsin State Assembly from the Milwaukee 10th district
- In office January 1, 1923 – January 2, 1933
- Preceded by: Fred Hasley
- Succeeded by: Frank Chermak

Personal details
- Born: October 16, 1895 Sheboygan, Wisconsin, U.S.
- Died: March 18, 1972 (aged 76) Milwaukee, Wisconsin, U.S.
- Resting place: Holy Cross Cemetery, Milwaukee
- Party: Progressive; Republican (before 1934)
- Spouse: Cecelia Mitchell (m. 1921; died 1956)
- Children: 1
- Education: Marquette University; University of Wisconsin–Extension
- Occupation: Real estate

John W. Eber (October 16, 1895 – March 18, 1972) was an American lawyer, businessman, and Progressive Republican politician from Milwaukee, Wisconsin. He was the 51st speaker of the Wisconsin State Assembly (1927–1928), and served ten years in the Assembly, representing the west side of the city of Milwaukee.

== Biography ==
Eber was born on October 16, 1895, in Sheboygan, Wisconsin. As a child he moved with his parents to St. Paul, Minnesota, and then to Milwaukee, Wisconsin, which was his primary residence for the rest of his life. He attended Marquette University and then the University of Wisconsin–Extension, then went into business with Willard P. Lyons in the insurance and real estate business.

Eber was first elected to the Wisconsin State Assembly in 1922, running on the Republican Party ticket. He represented Milwaukee's 10th Assembly district, which then comprised the 16th and 23rd wards of Milwaukee in the western part of the city. He was re-elected four times. He was chairman of the Judiciary Committee during the 1925–1926 session and was then chosen as speaker in the 1927–1928 session. He was the youngest speaker up to that time in Wisconsin history, but that record was broken a few years later by Cornelius T. Young.

Following redistricting in 1931, Eber resided in the new Milwaukee 8th Assembly district. He ran for a sixth term in the Assembly in 1932, but was defeated by Democrat James W. Higgins. He subsequently became a leader of the new Wisconsin Progressive Party, which had split from the Republican Party of Wisconsin after decades of factional fighting between Republican progressives and conservatives. He made another bid for a sixth term in 1934, running on the Progressive Party ticket, but lost to Democrat Donald P. Ryan.

Eber remained involved in public affairs after his election losses, and encouraged the public to become more educated about the business of the Legislature. He was also hired to handle legal work for the state branch of the Works Progress Administration. Eber subsequently settled into a law practice in Milwaukee.

Eber died of a heart attack at the Ambassador Hotel in Milwaukee on March 18, 1972.

== Personal life and family ==
On April 21, 1921, Eber married Cecelia "Celia" Mitchell of Waterford, New York. They had one daughter together and were married for 35 years before her death in 1956.

== Electoral history ==
=== Wisconsin Assembly (Milwaukee 10th district, 1922–1930) ===
Year	Election	Date	Elected				Defeated				Total	Plurality
1922	General	Nov. 7	John W. Eber	Republican	3,829	59.37%	William E. Jordan	Soc.	2,618	40.60%	6,449	1,211
1924	Primary	Sep. 2	John W. Eber (inc)	Republican			J. B. Retzer	Rep.				
1924	Primary	Sep. 2	John W. Eber (inc)	Republican			J. A. Lightner	Rep.				
1924	General	Nov. 4	John W. Eber (inc)	Republican	5,360	67.98%	Hugo Knuessel	Soc.	2,525	32.02%	7,885	2,835
1926	General	Nov. 2	John W. Eber (inc)	Republican	4,039	65.86%	Walter G. Otto	Soc.	2,094	34.14%	6,133	1,945
1928	General	Nov. 6	John W. Eber (inc)	Republican	6,922	49.88%	James D. Lawler	Dem.	4,655	33.55%	13,876	2,267
1928	General	Nov. 6	John W. Eber (inc)	Republican	6,922	49.88%	August Neitzel	Soc.	2,299	16.57%	13,876	2,267
1930	Primary	Sep. 16	John W. Eber (inc)	Republican	1,961	28.54%	Harold C. Schultz	Rep.	1,884	27.42%	6,871	77
1930	Primary	Sep. 16	John W. Eber (inc)	Republican	1,961	28.54%	Frank M. Stanton	Rep.	1,693	24.64%	6,871	77
1930	Primary	Sep. 16	John W. Eber (inc)	Republican	1,961	28.54%	John P. Murphy	Rep.	1,333	19.40%	6,871	77
1930	General	Nov. 6	John W. Eber (inc)	Republican	4,103	49.46%	Otto F. Erick	Soc.	2,513	30.29%	8,296	1,590
1930	General	Nov. 6	John W. Eber (inc)	Republican	4,103	49.46%	Richard F. Cline	Dem.	1,251	15.08%	8,296	1,590
1930	General	Nov. 6	John W. Eber (inc)	Republican	4,103	49.46%	John P. Murphy	Ind.	429	5.17%	8,296	1,590

=== Wisconsin Assembly (Milwaukee 8th district, 1932 & 1934) ===
Year	Election	Date	Elected				Defeated				Total	Plurality
1932	Primary	Sep. 20	John W. Eber	Republican	3,226	47.23%	McCarthy	Rep.	2,549	37.32%	6,830	677
1932	Primary	Sep. 20	John W. Eber	Republican	3,226	47.23%	John P. Murphy	Rep.	1,055	15.45%	6,830	677
1932	General	Nov. 8	James W. Higgins	Democratic	6,976	46.97%	John W. Eber	Rep.	4,872	32.81%	14,851	2,104
1932	General	Nov. 8	James W. Higgins	Democratic	6,976	46.97%	Frank Oldenburg	Soc.	3,003	20.22%	14,851	2,104
1934	Primary	Sep. 18	John W. Eber	Progressive	559	56.64%	Walter E. Wilson	Prog.	243	24.62%	987	316
1934	Primary	Sep. 18	John W. Eber	Progressive	559	56.64%	John P. Murphy	Prog.	185	18.74%	987	316
1934	General	Nov. 6	Donald P. Ryan	Democratic	3,716	35.35%	John W. Eber	Prog.	2,917	27.75%	10,513	799
1934	General	Nov. 6	Donald P. Ryan	Democratic	3,716	35.35%	Archie Bottoni	Soc.	2,143	20.38%	10,513	799
1934	General	Nov. 6	Donald P. Ryan	Democratic	3,716	35.35%	Leo B. Hanley	Rep.	1,737	16.52%	10,513	799

Wisconsin State Assembly
Preceded by Fred Hasley	Member of the Wisconsin State Assembly from the Milwaukee 10th district January 1, 1923 – January 2, 1933	Succeeded by Frank Chermak
Preceded by George A. Nelson	Speaker of the Wisconsin State Assembly; January 12, 1927 – January 7, 1929	Succeeded by Charles B. Perry
