= Riley S. Young =

American politician (1860–1952)

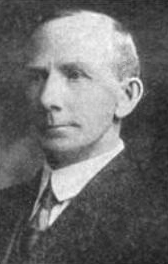

47th Speaker of the Wisconsin State Assembly
- In office January 1919 – January 1923
- Preceded by: Lawrence C. Whittet
- Succeeded by: John L. Dahl

Member of the Wisconsin State Assembly from the Walworth district
- In office January 1, 1917 – January 1, 1923
- Preceded by: George L. Harrington
- Succeeded by: Frank E. Lawson

Personal details
- Born: September 25, 1860 Sharon, Wisconsin, U.S.
- Died: June 28, 1952 (aged 91) Janesville, Wisconsin, U.S.
- Resting place: Darien Cemetery, Darien, Wisconsin
- Party: Republican
- Spouse: Elizabeth Williams (m. 1888; died 1931)
- Children: none

Riley S. Young (September 25, 1860 – June 28, 1952) was an American pharmacist, banker, and Republican politician. He was the 47th speaker of the Wisconsin State Assembly (1919–1923) and represented Walworth County.

== Biography ==
He was born in Sharon, Wisconsin. He graduated from high school in Delavan, Wisconsin in 1879. On April 11, 1888, he married Elizabeth Williams. Young eventually worked for the Hartford Fire Insurance Company.

Young died in Darien on June 28, 1952, at the age of 91.

== Political career ==
Young was first elected to the Assembly in 1916. He would later be chosen as Speaker for the 1919 and 1921 sessions. Previously, he had been Town Clerk of Darien (town), Wisconsin from 1887 to 1894. Young was a Republican.

Wisconsin State Assembly
Preceded by George L. Harrington	Member of the Wisconsin State Assembly from the Walworth district January 1, 1917 – January 1, 1923	Succeeded by Frank E. Lawson
Preceded by Lawrence C. Whittet	Speaker of the Wisconsin State Assembly; January 1919 – January 1923	Succeeded by John L. Dahl
