= Speaker of the Wisconsin State Assembly =

Presiding officer of the Wisconsin State Assembly

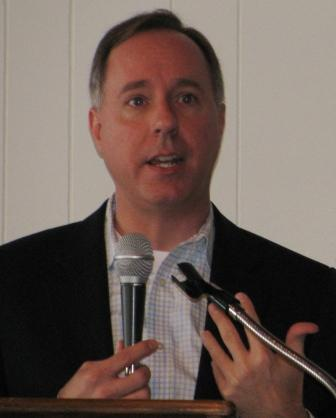
- Incumbent; Robin Vos since January 7, 2013
- Wisconsin State Assembly
- Style: Mr. Speaker (Informal); The Honorable (Formal)
- Status: Presiding officer
- Seat: Wisconsin State Capitol, Madison, Wisconsin
- Appointer: The Assembly
- Term length: At the Assembly's pleasure; elected at the beginning of the new Legislature by a majority of the representatives-elect, and upon a vacancy during a session.
- Constituting instrument: Constitution of Wisconsin
- Formation: June 5, 1848; 178 years ago
- First holder: Ninian E. Whiteside; June 5, 1848
- Deputy: Speaker pro tempore
- Salary: $53,299

The Speaker of the Wisconsin State Assembly is the presiding officer of the Wisconsin State Assembly, the lower house of the Wisconsin Legislature. Article IV of the Constitution of Wisconsin, ratified in 1848, establishes the legislature and specifies the election of officers. The role and responsibilities of the speaker are defined in the Assembly Rules, originally in Rule 1, and also, under the present rules, Rule 3.

== Selection ==
The speaker is chosen by a majority vote of the Assembly members at the start of each session or whenever a vacancy occurs in the role during a session, as such, the speaker is almost always the de facto leader of the Assembly's majority party. A speaker pro tempore is elected concurrent with the election of the speaker, to carry out the speaker's duties in his or her absence. Unlike the United States House of Representatives, the rules of the Assembly require that the speaker and speaker pro tempore be elected from among the members of the Assembly.

== Powers and duties ==
The speaker is empowered to make all Assembly committee assignments and office assignments for members, and supervises all officers of the Assembly. The speaker is required to authenticate all acts, orders, or proceedings from the Assembly, and, with the countersignature of the chief clerk, issues all subpoenas on behalf of the Assembly or its committees.

== Current Speaker ==
The current Speaker of the Assembly for the 105th Wisconsin Legislature is Robin Vos of Burlington, Racine County, Wisconsin. He is the 79th speaker since the establishment of the State Assembly and the 75th person to hold the office. He is currently serving his fourth term as speaker, first elected to the role on January 7, 2013.

The Speaker pro tempore is Representative Tyler August of Lake Geneva, Walworth County, Wisconsin. This is his third full term in the role after being elected by the caucus in the October 2013.

== List of speakers ==
=== Wisconsin Territory (1836–1848) ===
Assembly	Session (years)	Speaker	Party	Residence	Notes
1st	1st Session (1836)	Peter H. Engle	Democratic	Dubuque	
1st	2nd Session (1837 – 1838)	Isaac Leffler	Whig	Des Moines	
1st	Special Session (1838)	William B. Sheldon	Democratic	Milwaukee	
2nd	1st Session (1838)	John Wilford Blackstone Sr.	Whig	Iowa County	
2nd	2nd Session (1839)	Lucius Israel Barber	Whig	Milwaukee	
2nd	3rd Session (1839 – 1840)	Edward V. Whiton	Whig	Rock County	
2nd	4th Session (1840)	Nelson Dewey	Democratic	Grant County	
3rd	1st Session (1840 – 1841)	David Newland	Democratic	Iowa County	
3rd	2nd Session (1841 – 1842)	David Newland	Democratic	Iowa County	
4th	1st Session (1842 – 1843)	Albert Gallatin Ellis	Democratic	Portage	
4th	2nd Session (1843 – 1844)	George H. Walker	Democratic	Milwaukee	
4th	3rd Session (1845)	George H. Walker	Democratic	Milwaukee	
4th	4th Session (1846)	Mason C. Darling	Democratic	Fond du Lac	
5th	1st Session (1847)	William Shew	Democratic	Milwaukee	
5th	Special Session (1847)	Isaac P. Walker	Democratic	Milwaukee	
5th	2nd Session (1848)	Timothy Burns	Democratic	Iowa County	

=== Wisconsin State Assembly (1848–Present) ===
Order	Legislature (years)	Speaker	Party	Residence	Notes
1	1st (1848)	Ninian E. Whiteside	Democratic	Belmont, Lafayette County	
2	2nd (1849)	Harrison Carroll Hobart	Democratic	Sheboygan, Sheboygan County	
3	3rd (1850)	Moses M. Strong	Democratic	Mineral Point, Iowa County	
4	4th (1851)	Frederick W. Horn	Democratic	Cedarburg, Washington County	
5	5th (1852)	James McMillan Shafter	Whig	Sheboygan, Sheboygan County	
6	6th (1853)	Henry L. Palmer	Democratic	Milwaukee, Milwaukee County	
7	7th (1854)	Frederick W. Horn	Democratic	Cedarburg, Ozaukee County	
8	8th (1855)	Charles C. Sholes	Republican	Kenosha, Kenosha County	
9	9th (1856)	William Hull	Democratic	Potosi, Grant County	
10	10th (1857)	Wyman Spooner	Republican	Elkhorn, Walworth County	
11	11th (1858)	Frederick S. Lovell	Republican	Kenosha, Kenosha County	
12	12th (1859)	William P. Lyon	Republican	Racine, Racine County	
12	13th (1860)	William P. Lyon	Republican	Racine, Racine County	
13	14th (1861)	Amasa Cobb	Republican	Mineral Point, Iowa County	
14	15th (1862)	Joseph W. Beardsley	Union Democrat	Prescott, Pierce County	
15	16th (1863)	J. Allen Barber	Republican	Lancaster, Grant County	
16	17th (1864)	William W. Field	Union	Fennimore, Grant County	
16	18th (1865)	William W. Field	Union	Fennimore, Grant County	
17	19th (1866)	Henry D. Barron	Republican	St. Croix Falls, Polk County	
18	20th (1867)	Angus Cameron	Republican	La Crosse, La Crosse County	
19	21st (1868)	Alexander McDonald Thomson	Republican	Janesville, Rock County	
19	22nd (1869)	Alexander McDonald Thomson	Republican	Janesville, Rock County	
20	23rd (1870)	James M. Bingham	Republican	Palmyra, Jefferson County	
21	24th (1871)	William E. Smith	Republican	Fox Lake, Dodge County	
22	25th (1872)	Daniel Hall	Republican	Watertown, Jefferson County	
23	26th (1873)	Henry D. Barron	Republican	St. Croix Falls, Polk County	
24	27th (1874)	Gabriel Bouck	Democratic	Oshkosh, Winnebago County	
25	28th (1875)	Frederick W. Horn	Democratic	Cedarburg, Ozaukee County	
26	29th (1876)	Sam S. Fifield	Republican	Ashland, Ashland County	
27	30th (1877)	John B. Cassoday	Republican	Janesville, Rock County	
28	31st (1878)	Augustus Barrows	Greenbacker	Chippewa Falls, Chippewa County	
29	32nd (1879)	David M. Kelly	Republican	Green Bay, Brown County	
30	33rd (1880)	Alexander A. Arnold	Republican	Galesville, Trempealeau County	
31	34th (1881)	Ira B. Bradford	Republican	Augusta, Eau Claire County	
32	35th (1882)	Franklin L. Gilson	Republican	Ellsworth, Pierce County	
33	36th (1883 – 1884)	Earl P. Finch	Democratic	Oshkosh, Winnebago County	
34	37th (1885 – 1886)	Hiram Orlando Fairchild	Republican	Marinette, Marinette County	
35	38th (1887 – 1888)	Thomas Brooks Mills	Republican	Millston, Jackson County	
35	39th (1889 – 1890)	Thomas Brooks Mills	Republican	Millston, Jackson County	
36	40th (1891 – 1892)	James J. Hogan	Democratic	La Crosse, La Crosse County	
37	41st (1893 – 1894)	Edward Keogh	Democratic	Milwaukee, Milwaukee County	
38	42nd (1895 – 1896)	George B. Burrows	Republican	Madison, Dane County	
39	43rd (1897 – 1898)	George A. Buckstaff	Republican	Oshkosh, Winnebago County	
40	44th (1899 – 1900)	George H. Ray	Republican	La Crosse, La Crosse County	
40	45th (1901 – 1902)	George H. Ray	Republican	La Crosse, La Crosse County	
41	46th (1903 – 1904)	Irvine Lenroot	Republican	West Superior, Douglas County	
41	47th (1905 – 1906)	Irvine Lenroot	Republican	West Superior, Douglas County	
42	48th (1907 – 1908)	Herman L. Ekern	Republican	Whitehall, Trempealeau County	
43	49th (1909 – 1910)	Levi H. Bancroft	Republican	Richland Center, Richland County	
44	50th (1911 – 1912)	Charles A. Ingram	Republican	Durand, Pepin County	
45	51st (1913 – 1914)	Merlin Hull	Republican	Black River Falls, Jackson County	
46	52nd (1915 – 1916)	Lawrence C. Whittet	Republican	Edgerton, Rock County	
46	53rd (1917 – 1918)	Lawrence C. Whittet	Republican	Edgerton, Rock County	
47	54th (1919 – 1920)	Riley S. Young	Republican	Darien, Walworth County	
47	55th (1921 – 1922)	Riley S. Young	Republican	Darien, Walworth County	
48	56th (1923 – 1924)	John L. Dahl	Republican	Rice Lake, Barron County	
49	57th (1925 – 1926)	Herman W. Sachtjen	Republican	Madison, Dane County	
50	57th (1925 – 1926)	George A. Nelson	Republican	Milltown, Polk County	
51	58th (1927 – 1928)	John W. Eber	Republican	Milwaukee, Milwaukee County	
52	59th (1929 – 1930)	Charles B. Perry	Republican	Wauwatosa, Milwaukee County	
52	60th (1931 – 1932)	Charles B. Perry	Republican	Wauwatosa, Milwaukee County	
53	61st (1933 – 1934)	Cornelius T. Young	Democratic	Milwaukee, Milwaukee County	
54	62nd (1935 – 1936)	Jorge W. Carow	Progressive	Ladysmith, Rusk County	
55	63rd (1937 – 1938)	Paul R. Alfonsi	Progressive	Pence, Iron County	
56	64th (1939 – 1940)	Vernon Wallace Thomson	Republican	Richland Center, Richland County	
56	65th (1941 – 1942)	Vernon Wallace Thomson	Republican	Richland Center, Richland County	
56	66th (1943 – 1944)	Vernon Wallace Thomson	Republican	Richland Center, Richland County	
57	67th (1945 – 1946)	Donald C. McDowell	Republican	Soldiers Grove, Crawford County	
57	68th (1947 – 1948)	Donald C. McDowell	Republican	Soldiers Grove, Crawford County	
58	69th (1949 – 1950)	Alex L. Nicol	Republican	Sparta, Monroe County	
59	70th (1951 – 1952)	Ora R. Rice	Republican	Delavan, Walworth County	
59	71st (1953 – 1954)	Ora R. Rice	Republican	Delavan, Walworth County	
60	72nd (1955 – 1956)	Mark Catlin, Jr.	Republican	Appleton, Outagamie County	
61	73rd (1957 – 1958)	Robert G. Marotz	Republican	Shawano, Shawano County	
62	74th (1959 – 1960)	George Molinaro	Democratic	Kenosha, Kenosha County	
63	75th (1961 – 1962)	David J. Blanchard	Republican	Edgerton, Rock County	
64	76th (1963 – 1964)	Robert D. Haase	Republican	Marinette, Marinette County	
65	77th (1965 – 1966)	Robert T. Huber	Democratic	West Allis, Milwaukee County	
66	78th (1967 – 1968)	Harold Vernon Froehlich	Republican	Appleton, Outagamie County	
66	79th (1969 – 1970)	Harold Vernon Froehlich	Republican	Appleton, Outagamie County	
67	80th (1971 – 1972)	Robert T. Huber	Democratic	West Allis, Milwaukee County	
68	80th (1971 – 1972)	Norman C. Anderson	Democratic	Madison, Dane County	
68	81st (1973 – 1974)	Norman C. Anderson	Democratic	Madison, Dane County	
68	82nd (1975 – 1976)	Norman C. Anderson	Democratic	Madison, Dane County	
69	83rd (1977 – 1978)	Edward G. Jackamonis	Democratic	Waukesha, Waukesha County	
69	84th (1979 – 1980)	Edward G. Jackamonis	Democratic	Waukesha, Waukesha County	
69	85th (1981 – 1982)	Edward G. Jackamonis	Democratic	Waukesha, Waukesha County	
70	86th (1983 – 1984)	Thomas A. Loftus	Democratic	Sun Prairie, Dane County	
70	87th (1985 – 1986)	Thomas A. Loftus	Democratic	Sun Prairie, Dane County	
70	88th (1987 – 1988)	Thomas A. Loftus	Democratic	Sun Prairie, Dane County	
70	89th (1989 – 1990)	Thomas A. Loftus	Democratic	Sun Prairie, Dane County	
71	90th (1991 – 1992)	Walter Kunicki	Democratic	Milwaukee, Milwaukee County	
71	91st (1993 – 1994)	Walter Kunicki	Democratic	Milwaukee, Milwaukee County	
72	92nd (1995 – 1996)	David Prosser, Jr.	Republican	Appleton, Outagamie County	
73	93rd (1997 – 1998)	Ben Brancel	Republican	Endeavor, Marquette County	
74	93rd (1997 – 1998)	Scott R. Jensen	Republican	Waukesha, Waukesha County	
74	94th (1999 – 2000)	Scott R. Jensen	Republican	Waukesha, Waukesha County	
74	95th (2001 – 2002)	Scott R. Jensen	Republican	Waukesha, Waukesha County	
75	96th (2003 – 2004)	John Gard	Republican	Peshtigo, Marinette County	
75	97th (2005 – 2006)	John Gard	Republican	Peshtigo, Marinette County	
76	98th (2007 – 2008)	Michael Huebsch	Republican	West Salem, La Crosse County	
77	99th (2009 – 2010)	Michael J. Sheridan	Democratic	Janesville, Rock County	
78	100th (2011 – 2012)	Jeff Fitzgerald	Republican	Horicon, Dodge County	
79	101st (2013 – 2014)	Robin Vos	Republican	Burlington, Racine County	Longest-serving speaker
79	102nd (2015 – 2016)	Robin Vos	Republican	Burlington, Racine County	Longest-serving speaker
79	103rd (2017 – 2018)	Robin Vos	Republican	Burlington, Racine County	Longest-serving speaker
79	104th (2019 – 2020)	Robin Vos	Republican	Burlington, Racine County	Longest-serving speaker
79	105th (2021 – 2022)	Robin Vos	Republican	Burlington, Racine County	Longest-serving speaker
79	106th (2023 – 2024)	Robin Vos	Republican	Burlington, Racine County	Longest-serving speaker
79	107th (2025 – 2026)	Robin Vos	Republican	Burlington, Racine County	Longest-serving speaker
80	108th (2027 – 2028)	Greta Neubauer	Democratic	Racine, Racine County	

== See also ==
- Constitution of Wisconsin
- Wisconsin State Assembly
- Wisconsin Legislature
