= Sachtjen =

Sachtjen is a surname. Notable people with the surname include:

- Herman W. Sachtjen (1886–1978), American politician and jurist
- Tracy Sachtjen (born 1969), American curler
