= C59 =

C59 may refer to:

- ARM Cadete Francisco Márquez (C59), an Admirable-class minesweeper of the Mexican Navy
- Caldwell 59, a planetary nebula
- Caudron C.59, a French, two-seat biplane
- HMS Newfoundland (C59), a Fiji-class light cruiser of the Royal Navy
- JNR Class C59, a Japanese steam locomotive
- Lake Lawn Airport (FAA LID: C59), in Walworth County, Wisconsin
- Lockheed C-59 Lodestar, an American military aircraft
- Minimum Age (Industry) Convention (Revised), 1937 (ILO code C59), of the International Labour Organization
- Two Knights Defense (ECO: C59), a chess opening
- PSLV-C59, ISRO'S PSLV's 59th mission
