= Donald P. Ryan (Wisconsin politician) =

20th-century American politician

Member of the Wisconsin State Assembly from the Milwaukee 8th district
- In office January 7, 1935 – January 2, 1939
- Preceded by: James W. Higgins
- Succeeded by: Charles H. Judd

Personal details
- Born: February 5, 1909 Milwaukee, Wisconsin, U.S.
- Died: September 26, 1995 (aged 86) Milwaukee, Wisconsin, U.S.
- Resting place: Holy Cross Cemetery, Milwaukee
- Party: Democratic
- Spouse: Cecilia Mathilda Koering (m. 1936–1995)

Military service
- Allegiance: United States
- Branch/service: Wisconsin National Guard
- Unit: 105th Reg. U.S. Cavalry

Donald Patrick Ryan

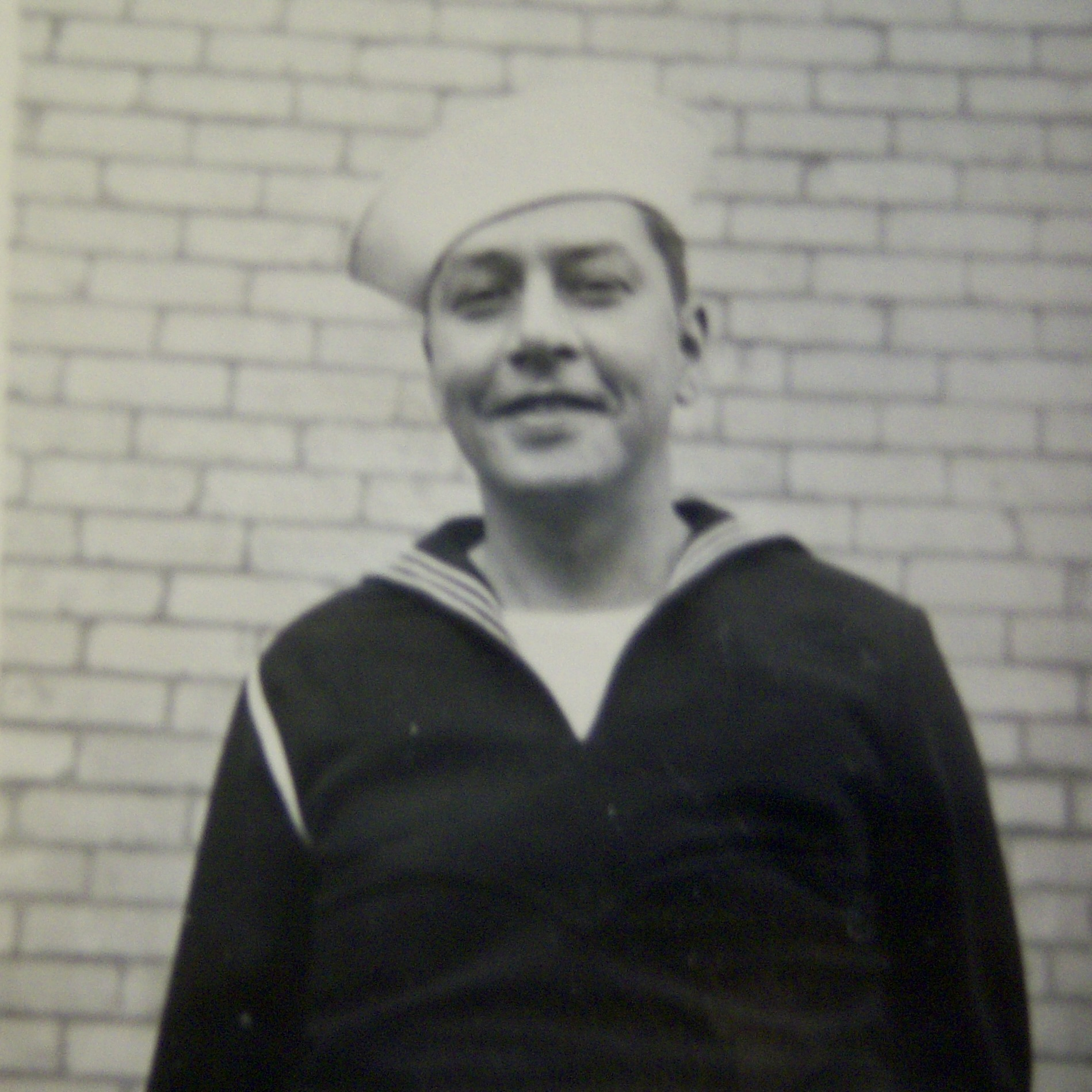
Donald P. Ryan home on leave from the U.S. Navy in 1942.

(February 5, 1909 – September 26, 1995) was an American Democratic politician from Milwaukee, Wisconsin. He was a member of the Wisconsin State Assembly for two terms, representing the west side of the city of Milwaukee from 1935 to 1939. He was one of the youngest state legislators in Wisconsin history, at just 24 years and 336 days old when first sworn in. Later, he enlisted in the U.S. Navy serving as one of the oldest seaman on board the aircraft carrier CV-17 Bunker Hill which fought in the Battle of the Philippines.

== Biography ==
Donald P. Ryan was born in Milwaukee, Wisconsin, on February 5, 1909, in an Irish Catholic family. He lived nearly his entire life in Milwaukee, attending St. Rose's Catholic School and then graduating from Saint Johns Cathedral High School in 1927. He worked as a fireman on the Milwaukee Railroad and was a member of the International Brotherhood of Electrical Workers labor union. He also served three years in the Wisconsin National Guard after graduating from high school.

He was elected to the Wisconsin State Assembly from Milwaukee County's 8th Assembly district in 1934 and re-elected in 1936. He served in the 1935–1936 and 1937–1938 sessions. At the time, he was the youngest member of the Legislature, being not quite 26 years old at the time of his inauguration. During this period he married Cecilia Mathilda Koering from Mazomanie, Wisconsin. He sought a third term in 1938 but was defeated in a primary challenge by Robert S. McCormack, who was defeated in the general election by Charles H. Judd.

Wisconsin State Assembly
Preceded by James W. Higgins	Member of the Wisconsin State Assembly from the Milwaukee 8th district January 7, 1935 – January 2, 1939	Succeeded by Charles H. Judd
