= Chermak =

Chermak is a surname. Notable people with the surname include:

- Cy Chermak (1929–2021), American producer and screenwriter
- Frank Chermak (1893–?), American politician
