= John L. Dahl =

20th century American politician

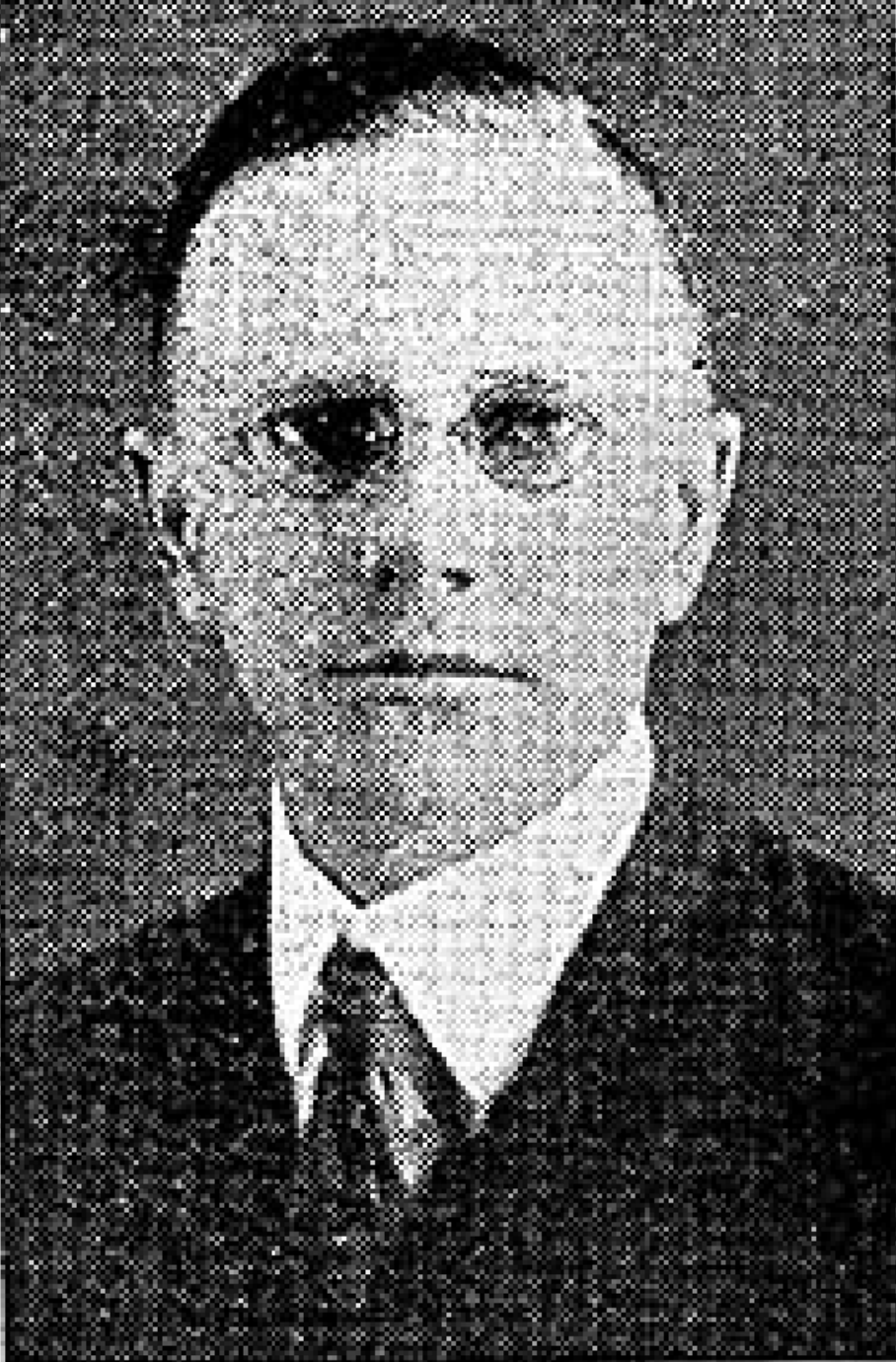
- Portrait from The Wisconsin Blue Book, 1921

48th Speaker of the Wisconsin State Assembly
- In office January 1923 – January 1925
- Preceded by: Riley S. Young
- Succeeded by: Herman W. Sachtjen

Member of the Wisconsin State Assembly from the Barron district
- In office January 3, 1921 – January 5, 1925
- Preceded by: Clarence Clinton Coe
- Succeeded by: Frank Roemhild

District Attorney of Barron County, Wisconsin
- In office January 6, 1919 – January 3, 1921
- Preceded by: John W. Soderberg
- Succeeded by: John W. Soderberg

Personal details
- Born: 1879 Unity, Trempealeau County, Wisconsin, U.S.
- Died: May 29, 1943 (aged 63–64) Strum, Wisconsin, U.S.
- Resting place: West Beef River Cemetery, Strum, Wisconsin
- Party: Republican
- Spouse: None
- Children: None
- Education: River Falls Normal School; University of Wisconsin; Hamilton College of Law
- Profession: lawyer

John L. Dahl (1879 – May 29, 1943) was an American lawyer and progressive Republican politician. He was the 48th speaker of the Wisconsin State Assembly (1923–1925) and represented Barron County.

== Biography ==
John Dahl was born in the town of Unity, Trempealeau County, Wisconsin, in 1879, the eldest of nine children born to Norwegian American immigrant parents. He was educated in public schools and then attended the River Falls Normal School. He went on to earn his bachelor's degree from the University of Wisconsin. He worked as a school principal and was city superintendent of schools. He established a farm, where he raised Holstein cattle and grew potatoes.

He later returned to school and graduated from the Hamilton College of Law in Chicago. He was admitted to the bar in 1916 and started a legal partnership, Dahl & Gannon, at Rice Lake, Wisconsin.

He served as county food administrator when the United States Food Administration was active, and, in 1918, was elected district attorney of Barron County, Wisconsin. He was a delegate to the 1920 Republican National Convention and was elected to the Wisconsin State Assembly that Fall. He was re-elected in 1922 and was chosen as speaker for the 1923–1924 session. His most notable achievement in the Legislature was passing additional funding for public schools.

After the 1924 legislative session, Dahl was accused of embezzling money from an acquaintance—Andrew Haugsboe. He fled the state and was arrested in Chicago in the fall of 1925. In order to avoid prosecution, Dahl signed a note pledging to repay the funds. The money had not been repaid by the time Haugsboe died, and the administrator of his estate sued to collect. The issue was still pending at the time of Dahl's death in 1943.

Dahl died at the home of his sisters on May 29, 1943.

== Electoral history ==
Wisconsin Assembly, Barron District Election, 1920
Party	Candidate	Votes	%	±%
General Election, November 2, 1920
Republican	John L. Dahl	4,679	61.60%	−12.97%
Independent	Lila J. Stout	2,917	38.40%	
Plurality		1,762	23.20%	-25.95%
Total votes		7,596	100.0%	+189.59%
Republican hold				

Wisconsin State Assembly
Preceded by Clarence Clinton Coe	Member of the Wisconsin State Assembly from the Barron district January 3, 1921 – January 5, 1925	Succeeded by Frank Roemhild
Preceded by Riley S. Young	Speaker of the Wisconsin State Assembly; January 1923 – January 1925	Succeeded by Herman W. Sachtjen
Legal offices
Preceded by John W. Soderberg	District Attorney of Barron County, Wisconsin; January 6, 1919 – January 3, 1921	Succeeded by John W. Soderberg
