= Albert E. Smith (Wisconsin politician) =

American politician

Albert E. Smith (1839 – after 1902) was a member of the Wisconsin State Assembly.

== Biography ==
Smith was born in Cape Vincent, New York in October 1839. Soon after, he moved with his parents to Wisconsin, settling in Walworth County, Wisconsin. During the American Civil War, he served with the 8th Wisconsin Volunteer Infantry Regiment of the Union Army, achieving the rank of captain.

== Political career ==
Smith was elected to the Assembly in 1900 and was re-elected in 1902. Additionally, he served as Mayor of Delavan, Wisconsin. He was a Republican.

== See also ==
- The Political Graveyard
