= Death of Carl Isaacs Jr. =

Formerly unidentified person

Carl Isaacs Jr.
- Photo of Carl Isaacs Jr. possibly taken by the Wisconsin Department of Corrections
- Born: Carl Junior Isaacs Jr. April 30, 1974
- Disappeared: April 16, 1995; Walworth, Wisconsin, U.S.
- Status: Identified on June 14, 2022
- Died: c. May or June of 1995 (aged 21)
- Body discovered: 10027 Waite Road, Beloit 42.596629°N 88.846621°W
- Resting place: Johnstown Center Cemetery, Rock County, Wisconsin
- Other names: John Clinton Doe, Rock County John Doe, "River Man"
- Height: Between 5 ft 5 in (1.65 m) and 5 ft 7 in (1.70 m)(approximate)

Carl Junior Isaacs Jr. (April 30, 1974 – c. May or June 1995) was a formerly unidentified American man from Delavan, Wisconsin whose skeletal remains were found alongside Turtle Creek in Bradford, near Clinton, Rock County, Wisconsin on November 26, 1995. He remained unidentified until February 2019, when the DNA Doe Project announced they had made a tentative identification, but his name was withheld until June 14, 2022. Prior to his 2022 identification, Isaacs was known as the Rock County John Doe and John Clinton Doe.

== Discovery ==
His nearly complete skeleton was found by hunters at approximately 9 a.m. within private property alongside the creek, in a remote, densely wooded 100-acre area owned by these hunters. His skeleton was mostly complete and articulated, lying on his belly, with his hands over his head, while his head and back were partially covered by a denim jacket. He was still dressed in contemporary clothing wore age-(minus a shoe), and was located on a steep embankment, ten feet from the creek and four feet from the barbed wire fence of the property.

It was initially estimated that the deceased died in the fall or winter of 1994, about one year before he was found, but later comparisons with more modern forensic facility research suggested that he may have died in the summer of 1995, around five months before his discovery.

The cause of death is currently unknown, as no signs of trauma were found on the decedent: a homicide was deemed unlikely, and no other causes could be determined. Analysis of his hair found no conclusive traces of opiates, making it unlikely that he had a long-term opioid addiction; however, this does not exclude the possibility that he was intoxicated or that he took hallucinogenic drugs before his death. It is believed he died from hypothermia from getting soaked in the creek - possibly after getting intoxicated - and becoming disoriented as a result.

His skull was cremated while the rest of his skeleton was buried in Johnstown Center Cemetery, Rock County, Wisconsin. His DNA and dental records are available.

== Physical description ==
The Caucasian male stood approximately 66'', or between 5 feet 4 inches or (1.65 m) and 5 feet 6 inches (1.70 m). His weight was estimated to be approximately 140 lb (64 kg). He was estimated to be between 17 and 20 years old. He had straight teeth and seemed to have received good dental care with only one or two fillings, and still had his wisdom teeth, with two having partially erupted and one being impacted.

The decedent wore a T-shirt with the trademarked logo of the British heavy metal group Venom on the back, which contained a golden five-pointed star surrounded by a circle with a goat head at the center and the caption "Welcome to hell" (the shirt was a model sold at their 1987 tour); gray urban camouflage fatigues of small/medium size; a lined flannel red and green jacket with a plaid design; size medium/34 boxer underwear with a Bart Simpson design; and a 1993 size 9-1/2 Black Nike Air Bound basketball shoe. Only one of the shoes were found at the site, lying near the skeleton.

The young man carried a distinctive pendant made from a dinner fork, shaped like the head of a goat. Other items found with the body were cigarette butts, a Budweiser disposable butane lighter with the caption "Proud to be Your Bud" printed on it, a tube of Carmex lip balm, and a black Aquatech watch.

His clothes, pendant and hair suggest that he was a heavy metal music aficionado and, as such, familiar with metal subculture, but investigations in the local metal circles did not bring conclusive results about his identity.

Several facial approximations were publicly released over time. The first reconstruction released by Project Edan in 2013 was considered to be inaccurate by authorities. The second reconstruction released in 2014 by the FBI was considered by official agencies to be the most accurate to date, depicting a 20-year-old youth with collar length, dark feathery hair, and high cheek bones. A third, colored and age-regressed version of the FBI approximation, regressed to approximately age 16, was released to the public in February 2016 to help identification.

== Investigation ==
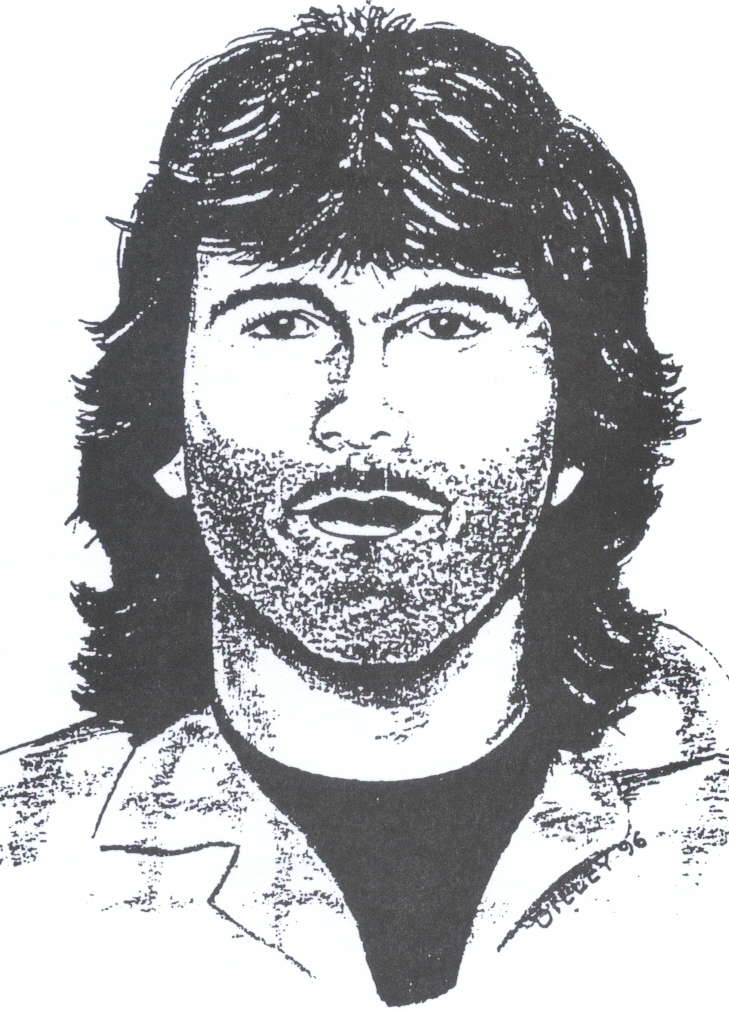
1994 eyewitness sketch of the man dubbed "River Guy", possibly the same man as Isaacs.

=== "River Guy" ===
Several witnesses remember seeing, on October 16, 1994, around 5:30 PM, a young man in his early twenties near the same area where the body was found. The man, who was wearing similar clothing as found with John Clinton Doe, was seen running and stumbling in Turtle Creek, visibly intoxicated and distraught. Dubbed "River Guy" by local investigators, he was reported by witnesses to have fallen in the water two or three times, trying to climb up the embankment and yelling at bystanders, telling them to get away from him. He also mentioned being wronged by a woman named Mary and being a fugitive. He was then seen sitting on the creek bank after his ramblings. Contrary to the FBI approximation of JCD, the 1994 police artist facial composite of "River Guy" shows him as having a light beard.

It was commonly believed by those close to the case that River Guy and John Clinton Doe were the same person. However, this hypothesis was challenged by the later forensic estimations based on body decomposition rates that JCD may have died later than originally determined, as late as May, 1995. As such this new range of the possible time of death (as late as the spring of 1995) did not correspond as closely with the date of "River Guy" sightings.

=== The pendant ===
In 2010, the distinctive goat pendant was traced by the Rock County Sheriff's detective working the case to a Janesville area craftsman. Active in the local metal scene, the man claimed to have made the pendant as well as sold or given similar items to a dozen people. However, none of these people could be traced back as John Clinton Doe.

=== Isotopic analysis ===
Isotopic analysis of the bones conducted in 2014 with the help of Smithsonian Institution scientists showed that the young man was from or had spent a significant amount of time in the Midwestern area, around the Great Lakes, which includes the states of Wisconsin, Illinois, Minnesota and Michigan. This, with the provenance of the goat pendant leads investigators to believe that the decedent was not living very far from where he was found.

=== DNA Genealogy ===
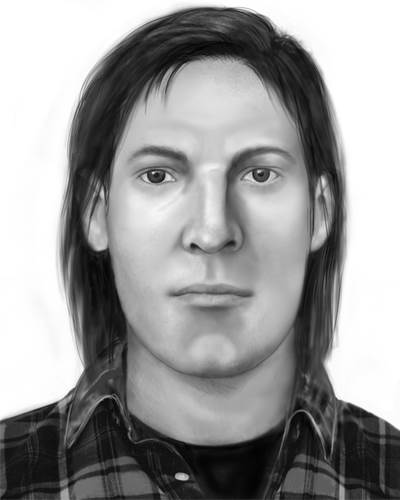
2014 reconstruction of Isaacs

At the request of the local law enforcement, in 2018 the DNA Doe Project took on the case in collaboration with NCMEC, Fulgent Genetics, Aerodyne Research Inc., and Full Genomes Corporation and attempted to identify the body by using autosomal DNA, the web site GEDmatch and genetic genealogy to trace relatives. In February 2019, the DNA Doe Project announced they had tentatively identified John Clinton Doe. His name was not released immediately pending announcement by the Rock County Sheriff's office.

=== Identification ===
On June 14, 2022, at 13:30 PM CST, the Rock County Sheriff's office held a press conference led by Sheriff Troy Knudson, in which the deceased individual was identified as Carl Junior Isaacs Jr. Isaacs lived in Delavan, Walworth County prior to his death. He had a criminal history of burglary, petty theft, and destruction of property. In March 1992, Isaacs was sentenced to 5 years in prison for burglary and vandalism of golf carts and other property at the Delbrook Golf Course in Delavan. He was at three different prisons beginning in April 1992. By the fall of 1993, Isaacs was imprisoned at the Oakhill Correctional Institute in Oregon, Wisconsin. There were periods of time in which he was released to house arrest and to a halfway house on Odana Road in Madison. In April 1995, Isaacs was at his mother's home in Walworth under house arrest. He disappeared from home on April 16, 1995, and was never seen or heard from again. A judge in Walworth County immediately signed an arrest warrant for Isaacs for probation violation. The warrant was renewed up through April 2018. The investigation into the manner and circumstances surrounding Isaacs' death was declared to be ongoing.

According to Sheriff Knudson, Isaacs had not been reported missing prior to his death. When asked about a photograph of Isaacs displayed at the press conference, Sheriff Knudson said that Isaacs had contact with the Wisconsin Department of Corrections, where the photo had potentially been taken.

== See also ==
- List of solved missing person cases
- List of unsolved deaths

== Gallery ==
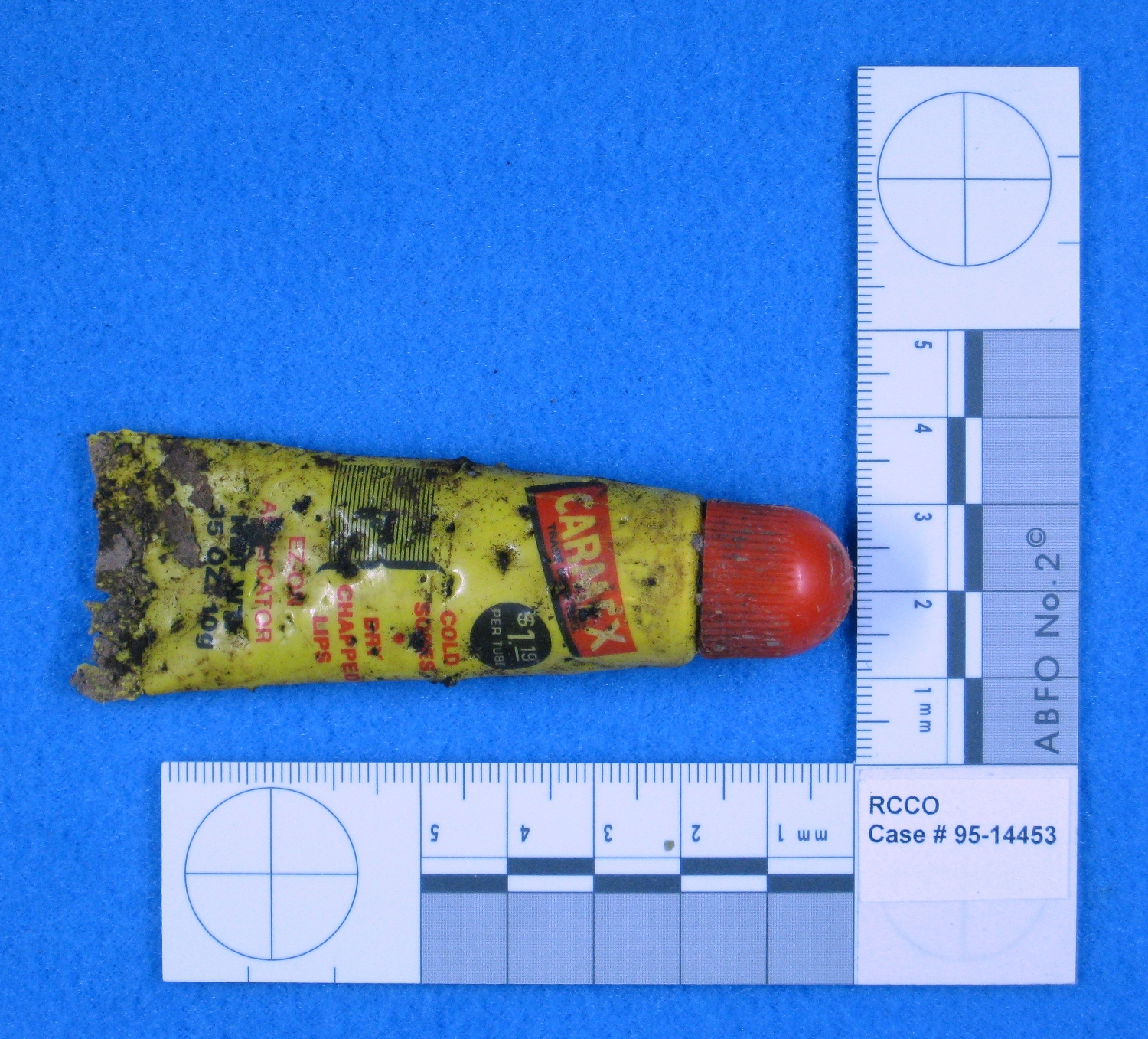
Carmex lip balm

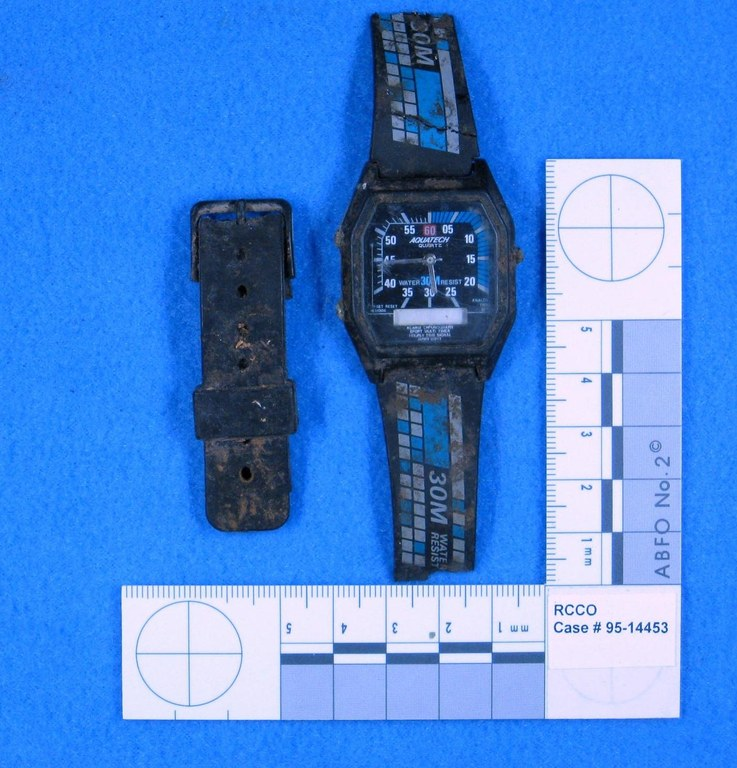
Black Aquatech quartz watch

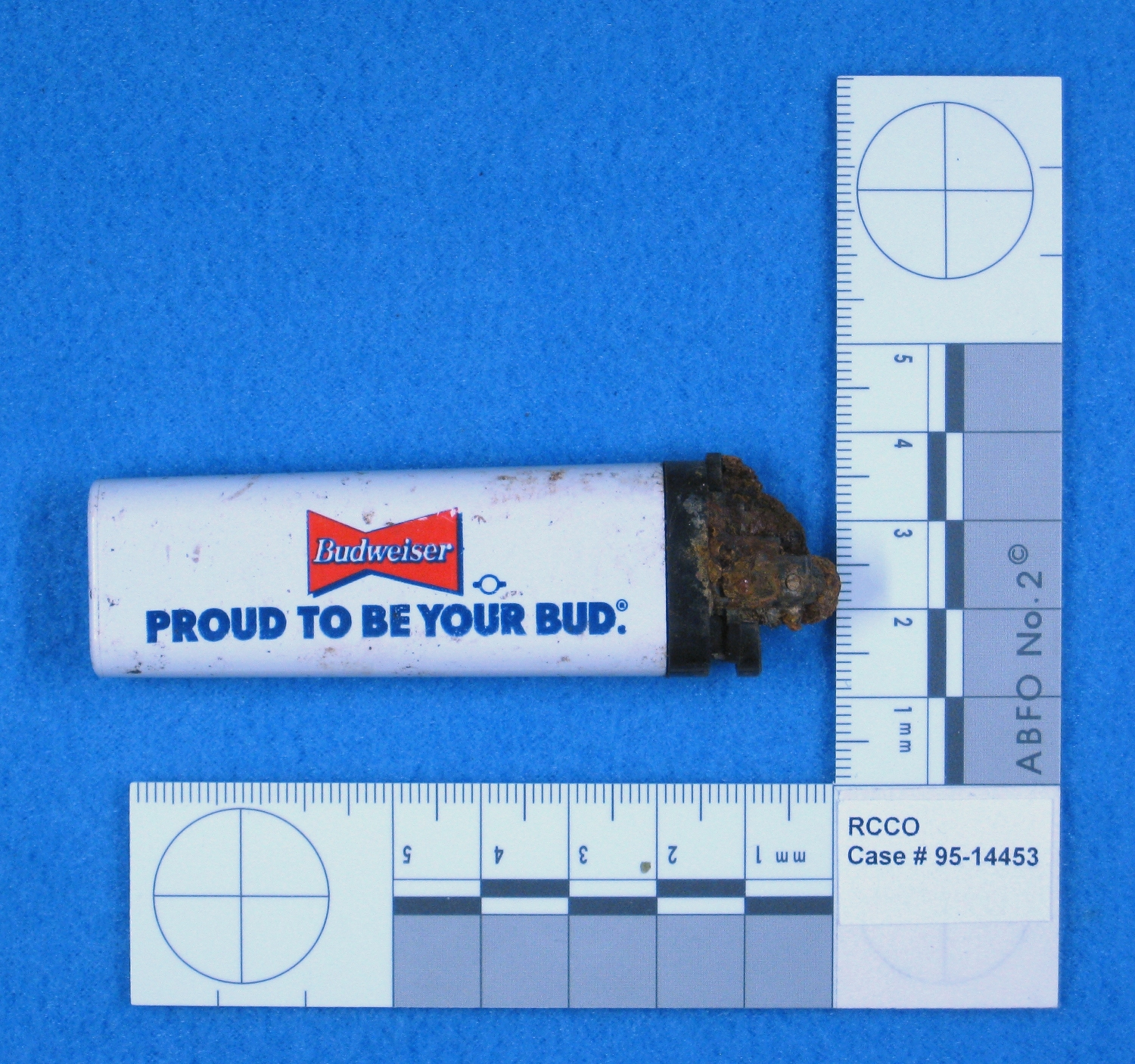
Budweiser butane disposable lighter.

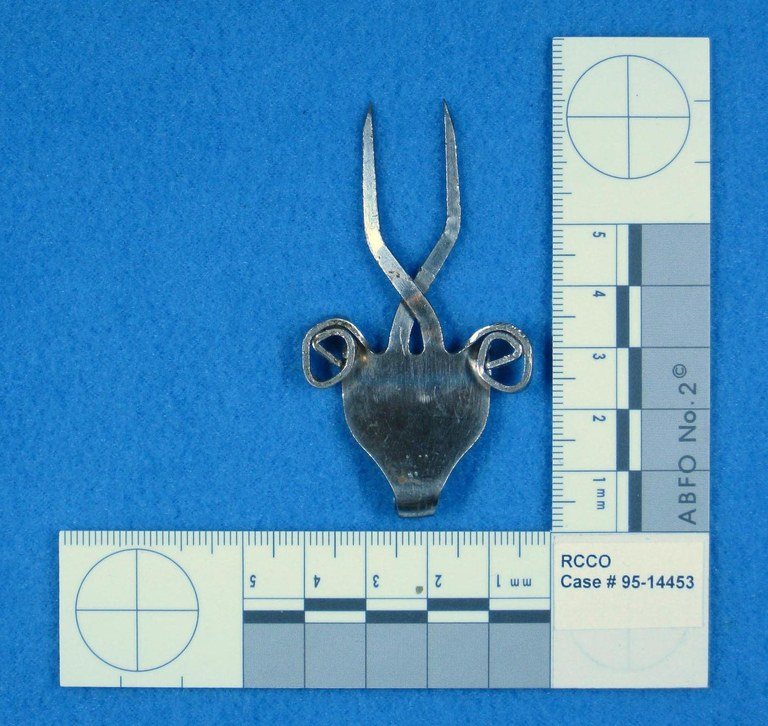
Homemade goat pendant made from a fork. The item was traced back to a Janesville craftsman
