= Herman W. Sachtjen =

American politician & jurist (1886–1978)

Herman Sachtjen

Wisconsin Circuit Judge for the 9th circuit, branch 2
- In office November 1, 1943 – December 1, 1956
- Appointed by: Walter Samuel Goodland
- Preceded by: August C. Hoppmann
- Succeeded by: Edwin M. Wilkie

Wisconsin Circuit Judge for the 9th circuit, branch 1
- In office January 1, 1926 – January 1, 1927
- Appointed by: John J. Blaine
- Preceded by: E. Ray Stevens
- Succeeded by: Albert G. Zimmerman

49th Speaker of the Wisconsin State Assembly
- In office January 14, 1925 – December 31, 1925
- Preceded by: John L. Dahl
- Succeeded by: George A. Nelson

Member of the Wisconsin State Assembly from the Dane 1st district
- In office January 3, 1921 – December 31, 1925
- Preceded by: Marcus E. Johnson
- Succeeded by: Alvin C. Reis

Personal details
- Born: November 28, 1886 Minneapolis, Minnesota, U.S.
- Died: March 24, 1978 (aged 91) Verona, Wisconsin, U.S.
- Resting place: Lakeview Lutheran Cemetery, Madison, Wisconsin
- Party: Progressive (1934–1946); Republican
- Spouse: Mabel Minne Homewood (died 1975)
- Children: William Charles Sachtjen; (b. 1918; died 1990); 3 others

Herman Wilhelm Gustav Sachtjen (November 28, 1886 – March 24, 1978) was an American lawyer, judge, and progressive Republican politician from Dane County, Wisconsin. He served as the 49th speaker of the Wisconsin State Assembly, and later served 14 years as a Wisconsin circuit court judge in south-central Wisconsin.

== Early life and education ==
Herman W. Sachtjen was born in Minneapolis, Minnesota, but soon returned with his family to Dane County, Wisconsin, to the farm in the town of Burke where his father had been born and raised.

He grew up working on the family farm. After receiving his early education in the rural county school in Burke, Sachtjen was sent to attend the public schools in the neighboring city of Madison, Wisconsin, for most of his primary education, graduating from Madison High School in 1905. He went on to attend the University of Wisconsin, earning his bachelor's degree in 1909 and graduating from the University of Wisconsin Law School in 1911.

== Career ==
After graduating, he practiced law in Madison for several years and quickly became involved in politics with the Republican Party of Wisconsin. He was secretary of the Dane County Republican committee in 1912 and 1913 and was chairman from 1916 through 1925.

In 1920, he was nominated by the Republican Party and elected without Democratic opposition to the Wisconsin State Assembly, representing Dane County's 1st Assembly district. At the time, the district solely comprised the city and town of Madison. He was re-elected with similarly little opposition in 1922. He won re-election in 1924 with a large majority over Democratic and Independent candidates.

In 1923 he was appointed state prohibition commissioner by Governor John J. Blaine, though Sachtjen was personally opposed to prohibition before, during, and after his time as commissioner. He resigned as commissioner in 1925 in order to devote his attention to serving as speaker of the Assembly during the 57th Wisconsin Legislature, but was re-appointed commissioner of prohibition again after the regular session of the Assembly concluded. He resigned again as prohibition commissioner and resigned from the Assembly in December 1925, when he was appointed Wisconsin circuit judge for branch 1 of the 9th circuit. As an appointee, he had to run for election to fill the remainder of the unexpired term in the Spring 1926 election, but was defeated by Dane County judge Albert G. Zimmerman. His term expired at the end of 1926.

He briefly returned to his legal practice, but was soon appointed Dane County divorce counsel by the circuit judges covering Dane county—August C. Hoppmann and his 1926 opponent Albert G. Zimmerman. He served in that role for the next 17 years. He challenged Zimmerman again in the judicial election of 1932 but lost again.

He returned to the judicial bench in 1943, when he was appointed to replace judge Hoppmann, who had died in office. This time he won a subsequent 1944 election to remain in office and was re-elected again without opposition in 1949 and 1955, serving for another 13 years. On turning 70 on November 28, 1956, he reached the mandatory retirement age that existed for Wisconsin judges at that time, and formally retired from the bench on December 1, 1956.

== Personal life and family ==
Sachtjen was the eldest of seven children born to William and Pauline (née Hartkopf) Sachtjen. William Sachtjen lived most of his life in Burke and served on the town board, the school board, and the county board. William Sachtjen's father was a German American immigrant, who settled in Dane County in 1848.

Herman Sachtjen married Mabel Minne Homewood of Prairie du Chien, Wisconsin, on September 15, 1915. They had four children together, though one died in infancy. Their eldest son was William Charles Sachtjen, who went on to serve as an officer in the United States Army during World War II and was elected Dane County judge and later a Wisconsin circuit judge for the 9th circuit, serving 12 years.

Herman and Mabel Sachtjen were married for nearly 60 years, until her death in 1975. He entered a retirement home in Verona, Wisconsin, where he died on March 24, 1978, at age 91.

== Electoral history ==
=== Wisconsin Assembly (1920, 1922, 1924) ===
Wisconsin Assembly, Dane 1st District Election, 1920
Party	Candidate	Votes	%	±%
General Election, November 2, 1920
Republican	Herman W. Sachtjen	11,261	96.38%	+27.45%
Independent	Taynton	423	3.62%	
Plurality		10,838	92.76%	+52.64%
Total votes		11,684	100.0%	+139.13%
Republican hold				

Wisconsin Assembly, Dane 1st District Election, 1922
Party	Candidate	Votes	%	±%
Republican Primary, September 5, 1922
Republican	Herman W. Sachtjen (incumbent)	6,229	57.60%	
Republican	Otto Toepfer	4,586	42.40%	
Plurality		1,643	15.19%	
Total votes		10,815	100.0%	
General Election, November 7, 1922
Republican	Herman W. Sachtjen (incumbent)	7,540	93.27%	−3.11%
Independent	W. J. Robinson	544	6.73%	
Plurality		6,996	86.54%	-6.22%
Total votes		8,084	100.0%	-30.81%
Republican hold				

Wisconsin Assembly, Dane 1st District Election, 1924
Party	Candidate	Votes	%	±%
General Election, November 4, 1924
Republican	Herman W. Sachtjen (incumbent)	12,108	58.90%	
Independent	James McDonald	5,890	28.65%	
Democratic	John H. Bowman	2,560	12.45%	
Plurality		6,218	30.25%	-56.30%
Total votes		20,558	100.0%	+154.30%
Republican hold				

=== Wisconsin circuit court (1926, 1932) ===
Wisconsin Circuit Court, 9th Circuit, Branch 1 Election, 1926
Party	Candidate	Votes	%	±%
General Election, April 6, 1926
Nonpartisan	A. G. Zimmerman	15,775	55.34%	
Nonpartisan	Herman W. Sachtjen (incumbent)	9,890	34.69%	
Nonpartisan	E. C. Frank Meier	2,841	9.97%	
Plurality		5,885	20.64%	
Total votes		28,506	100.0%	

Wisconsin Circuit Court, 9th Circuit, Branch 1 Election, 1932
Party	Candidate	Votes	%	±%
General Election, April 5, 1932
Nonpartisan	A. G. Zimmerman (incumbent)	23,276	59.33%	+3.99%
Nonpartisan	Herman W. Sachtjen	15,957	40.67%	+5.98%
Plurality		7,319	18.66%	
Total votes		39,233	100.0%	+37.63%

Wisconsin State Assembly
Preceded by Marcus E. Johnson	Member of the Wisconsin State Assembly from the Dane 1st district January 3, 1921 – December 31, 1925	Succeeded by Alvin C. Reis
Preceded by John L. Dahl	Speaker of the Wisconsin State Assembly; January 14, 1925 – December 31, 1925	Succeeded by George A. Nelson
Legal offices
Preceded by E. Ray Stevens	Wisconsin Circuit Judge for the 9th circuit, branch 1 January 1, 1926 – January 1, 1927	Succeeded by Albert G. Zimmerman
Preceded by August C. Hoppmann	Wisconsin Circuit Judge for the 9th circuit, branch 2 October 28, 1943 – December 1, 1956	Succeeded by Edwin M. Wilkie
