= Lake Lawn Resort =

Coordinates: 42°37′33″N 88°36′00″W

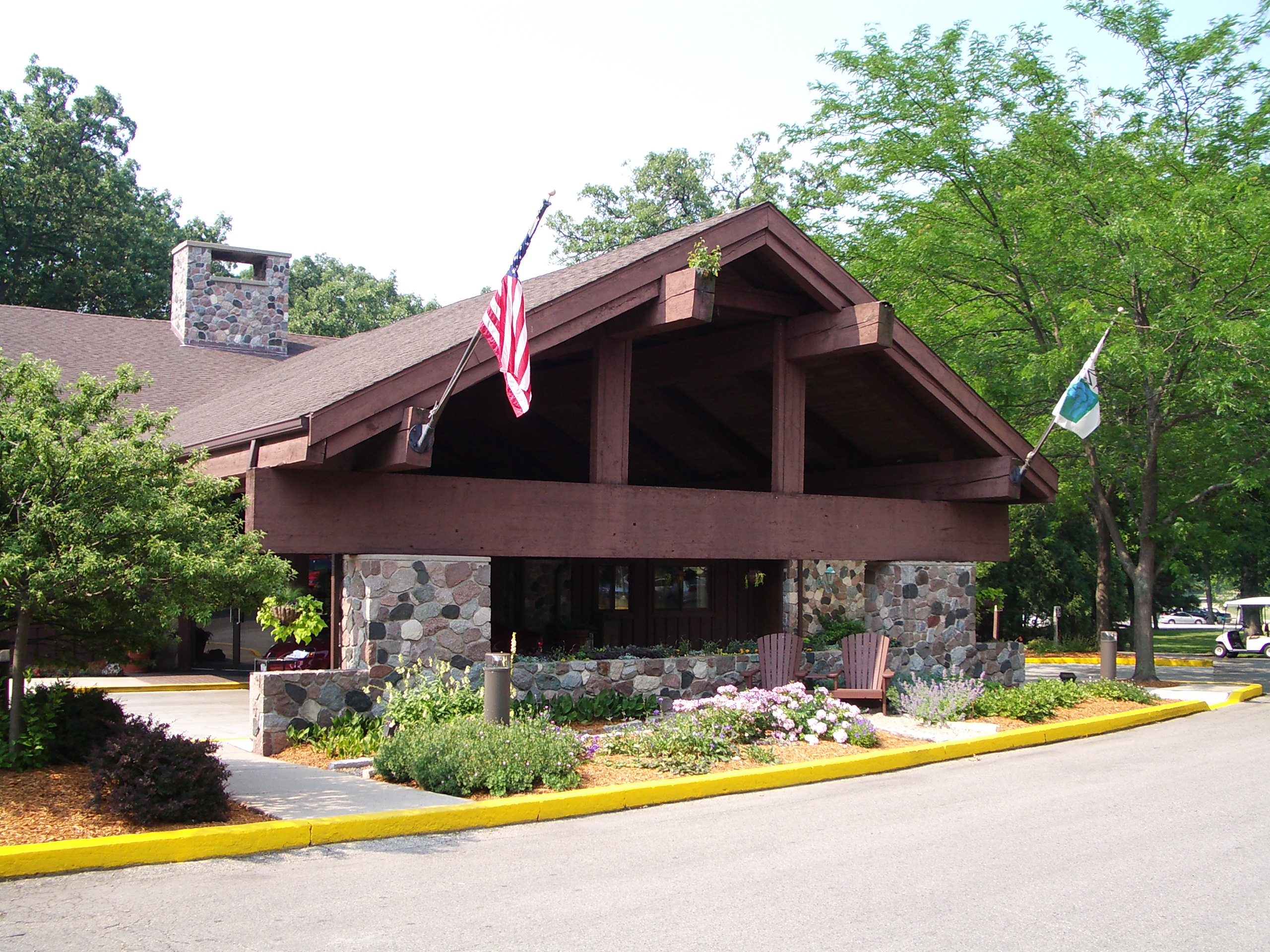
Exterior of Reception Area

Lake Lawn Resort is a resort in Delavan, Wisconsin, United States located on the shores on Delavan Lake. It is located off Highway 50 (Geneva Street), near Interstate 43. Lake Lawn has its own private airport, Lake Lawn Airport.

== History ==
The north shore of Delavan Lake, where Lake Lawn Resort is situated, was occupied by Native Americans as early as 1000 BC. The resort's construction unearthed many artifacts from these tribes that are currently on display throughout the facility. The original hotel was built there in 1878 as a place for members of the Mabie Circus to stay. When the circus was bought by Barnum and Bailey, it became the winter headquarters of that circus. Famously, when one of Barnum and Bailey's stage elephants died, the circus owners ordered that the elephant be pushed out onto the middle of the lake (conveniently the lake was frozen for the winter). Come springtime and thaw, the semi-preserved elephant's corpse sank under the water once the ice was sufficiently thin.

In 1923, Lake Lawn Lodge became a retreat for the employees of Commonwealth Edison, People's Light and Coke Company, and the Public Service Company of Northern Illinois. Commonwealth Edison added numerous facilities, including a golf course (opened 1928) and a ballroom. In 1929, Commonwealth Edison sold the property, and the new owner opened the hotel to the public; by 1942, the hotel would be open year-round. As the number of vacationers grew, the resort expanded, adding new dining and shopping facilities, a convention center, a remodeled golf course, and its own airport (opened 1948). Guest facilities expanded dramatically, with the addition of Timber Lodge (with an indoor pool and health club, 1958); Boulder Lodge (1962); Woodlawn Lodge (with its own indoor pool, 1968); the paired Shorewood Lodges (1973); and Norwood Lodge (1980). The ballroom burnt to the ground in spectacular fashion in 1978. Under the management of Ramada Inns, the resort added a new reception desk (1980) and outdoor pool (1985). Owing to its age, the majority of the main hotel was demolished in 1984, though the lobby of the main hotel was preserved and renamed the Great Room. Dick Nugent would redesign the golf course in 1990.

The resort underwent many ownership changes between 1990 and 2005. During this time, the complex added the slogan "Resort to the Finest"; shortly thereafter, it became "Lake Lawn Resort". Each change brought a round of renovations to public areas, guest rooms, or the golf course. Delavan Resort Holdings purchased the property in 2004 and embarked on an ambitious $390 million redevelopment plan. $40 million in renovations were completed in 2006 on all of the guest rooms, as well as Timber Pool; the health club area in Timber Lodge became a spa. Woodlawn Lodge, the only guest lodge not connected to the rest of the complex by a walkway, was completely emptied and remodeled using a "coastal" theme into Lakewood Suites; an outdoor pool was added to replace Woodlawn's indoor pool. As part of the redevelopment plan, the entire resort became a condotel, with individual rooms sold as condominium units and "rented" to vacationers. Delavan Resort Holdings would break a major contract involving these "condotel" holdings, leading to a $13.1 million lawsuit.

== Today ==
The present resort contains nearly 300 guest rooms, a conference center (with 22 meeting rooms), three restaurants, a gift shop, a golf course, driving range, airport, marina, three pools, game room, and a spa. On August 5, 2009, Anchor Bank of Madison foreclosed on the property; the bank would then buy the entire resort for $19.97 million at the foreclosure sale on October 7, 2010. Exactly two months later, Lake Lawn Resort was closed, putting 276 employees out of work. Six months after, a group of investors headed by local businessman Gregg Kunes formed Delavan Lake Lawn LLC and purchased the property for $9.5 million, with plans to reopen the facility as a resort. The golf course and marina reopened on May 27, 2011. The rest of the resort reopened on July 22, 2011. Though the airport is unmanned, the runway has been reopened.
