= George A. Nelson =

American farmer and politician (1873–1962)

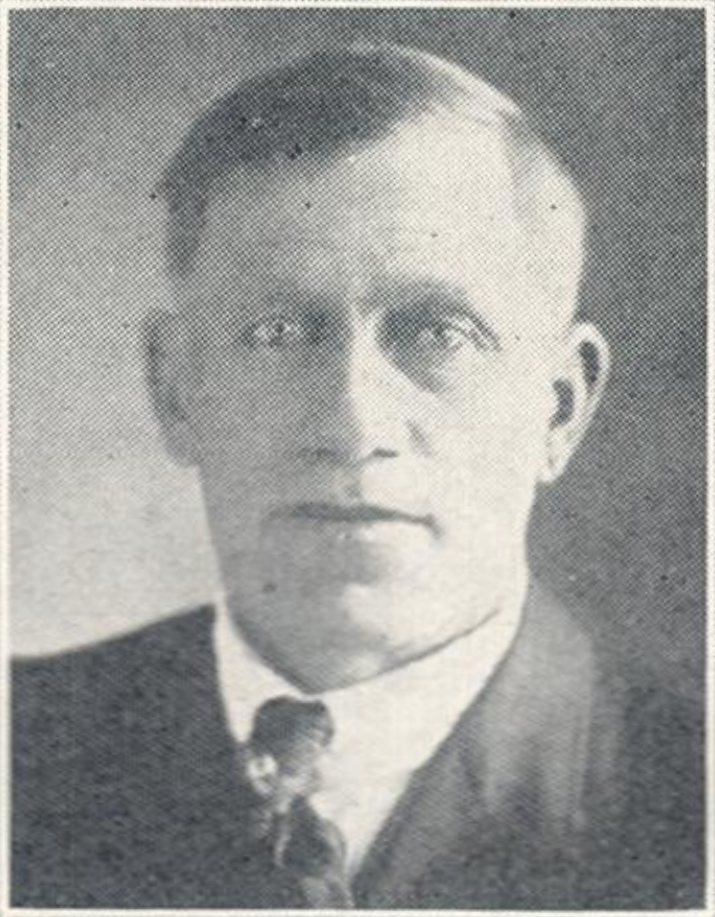
- Nelson, circa 1925

50th Speaker of the Wisconsin State Assembly
- In office April 15, 1926 – January 3, 1927
- Preceded by: Herman W. Sachtjen
- Succeeded by: John W. Eber

Member of the Wisconsin State Assembly from the Polk County district
- In office January 3, 1921 – January 3, 1927
- Preceded by: Axel Johnson
- Succeeded by: E. E. Husband

Personal details
- Born: November 15, 1873 Polk County, Wisconsin, U.S.
- Died: May 4, 1962 (aged 88) St. Croix Falls, Wisconsin, U.S.
- Resting place: Milltown Cemetery, Milltown, Wisconsin
- Party: Progressive (1938); Socialist (1930s); Republican (1920s); Social Democratic (before 1920)
- Spouse: Anna Christine Larsen
- Children: 7
- Occupation: Farmer

George A. Nelson (November 15, 1873 – May 4, 1962) was an American dairy farmer, farm organization leader, and socialist politician. He is best remembered as the 1936 candidate of the Socialist Party of America for Vice President of the United States and member of the Wisconsin Progressive Party. He previously served as the 50th speaker of the Wisconsin State Assembly, and represented Polk County in the Assembly for three terms.

== Early years ==
George A. Nelson was born of Danish parents on a Polk County, Wisconsin, farm on November 15, 1873. He worked as a farmhand in his youth but was restless and left young to see the world, sailing the length of the Mississippi River and working as a laborer, miner, and machinist in some 38 states of the union, Canada, and Mexico by the time he was 25.

Nelson was one of the original "Sourdoughs," a miner in the Yukon gold rush of 1898. While in the Yukon, George's friend pushed him out of the way of a falling rock during a mine collapse. George survived but his friend died. George paid to have his friend's body shipped back to his family in the lower 48 states. His adventure in the north proved to be successful and he returned to Polk County with enough gold to purchase a farm in Milltown, Wisconsin, where he worked throughout his life as a small-scale dairy farmer. At the time of his 1936 campaign for Vice President of the United States, Nelson's farm consisted of 180 acres (0.73 km^{2}), which supported 20 cows and produced various small crops.

Nelson eventually married; and was the father of seven children — four boys and three girls. The children assisted in the operation of the family farm and no additional labor was employed. Nelson was active in the cooperative movement, which touted over 450 cooperative creameries during the decade of the 1930s.

== Political career ==
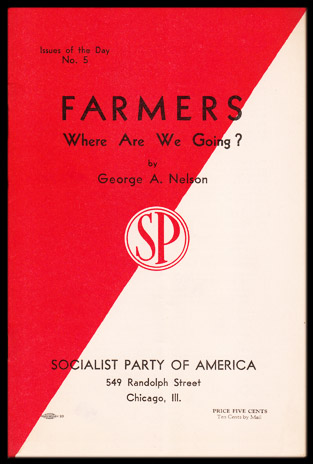
George Nelson was the author of two political pamphlets on agricultural issues published by the Socialist Party in the 1930s.

Nelson joined the Social Democratic Party of America headed by Victor L. Berger and Eugene V. Debs in 1899. He served as school clerk in 1901 for 35 years. Nelson was elected to the Wisconsin State Assembly and served as Speaker of the Assembly for the 1926 term.

Nelson was a member of the Board of Regents of the University of Wisconsin during the 1930s. He was a long-time leader of the American Society of Equity, a farmers' rights organization, serving as President of the Wisconsin Section from 1922 to 1931, and was active in the Farm Holiday Association, elected as a vice president in 1936.

In 1934, Nelson was the candidate of the Socialist Party of America for Governor of Wisconsin, receiving over 50,000 votes in the race.

George A. Nelson as he was drawn in the Socialist press during the 1936 campaign.

The 1936 Convention of the Socialist Party, held in Cleveland, Ohio, named Nelson to the ticket as the party's vice presidential nominee. With party leader Norman Thomas from New York state heading the ticket and making his traditional appeal to young and educated Americans, the selection of the Midwestern farmer Nelson was clearly intended as a calculated attempt at ticket balancing, a signal that the Socialist Party was ready to seriously join the growing movement for a Farmer-Labor party in America.

Nelson spent much of the 1936 campaign traveling across the midsection of the country, speaking in Minnesota and Indiana to labor and farmer groups in early July before addressing an anticipated crowd of 25,000 at the Wisconsin state picnic mid-month. The end of July saw Nelson making campaign stops in Illinois, where he spoke on behalf of John Fisher, the Socialist Party's candidate for governor.

After the campaign stint in the Midwest, Nelson was hustled back east to the core of the Socialist Party's strength. He spoke in Pennsylvania in early August before making his way to New York City at a reception in his honor on August 13, 1936, in the club room of the Hotel Delano, where he shared the podium with Harry W. Laidler, Socialist candidate for Governor of New York. At the New York event, Nelson declared that American farmers were "victims of the capitalist skin-game" and that the New Deal of President Franklin D. Roosevelt was ineffectual since "we can't regulate what we don't own." The end of August featured Nelson appearances in upstate New York, New Jersey, Washington, D.C., and Maryland.

Huge banners of Socialist candidates Norman Thomas and George Nelson flanked the rostrum at the final rally of the 1936 campaign, held at Madison Square Garden.

Nelson was a bitter opponent of the 1933 Agricultural Adjustment Act, a centerpiece of the New Deal's efforts to support American farmers by cutting production to raise market prices. He declared from the stump on the campaign trail:

"We farmers were asked to ship 6 million little pigs to fertilizer plants — not to slaughter houses. We then had the further privilege of buying back fertilizer so we could raise more and better corn to feed our hogs, so the hogs could be sent to the fertilizer plant to start the circle all over again!

"But there's a certain advantage to the plan. Mother can use all those fertilizer bags to sew patches on our overalls!"

After his eastern jaunt, Nelson then returned home to Wisconsin to speak at the Wisconsin State Fair at Milwaukee on August 28, a city with a Socialist local government. Nelson then immediately departed for another "Socialist city," making his first appearance on the same platform as SPA Presidential nominee Thomas at a "monster rally" held in Reading, Pennsylvania, on August 30.

In September, Nelson was sent into the South, including campaign stops in South Carolina, Georgia, and Florida. October saw Nelson's return to the Midwest, where he spoke across the states of Ohio, Indiana, and Missouri before heading for Kansas and Oklahoma.

The finale of the 1936 Socialist Party campaign took place on Sunday, November 1, 1936, when the party faithful gathered at Madison Square Garden in New York City to hear Thomas, Nelson, Laidler, black Congressional candidate Frank R. Crosswaith, and Milwaukee Mayor Daniel W. Hoan. Giant portraits of Norman Thomas and George Nelson flanked the stage, with a 40-foot (12 m) tall banner of a hand-and-torch — a Socialist Party emblem — immediately behind the rostrum. Hoan and Nelson spoke from Chicago, with their voices broadcast to the huge auditorium via radio hookup. Nelson's call for America to continue "the pioneering spirit of our forefathers" towards a socialist reorganization of society drew a mighty cheer from the gathering.

In 1938, Nelson was the candidate for Lieutenant Governor of Wisconsin of the Farmer-Labor Progressive Federation. After that federation ended in 1941, he was again candidate for Governor of Wisconsin in 1944.

== Death and legacy ==
George Nelson died on May 4, 1962, in a hospital in St. Croix Falls, Wisconsin.

Nelson was married and the father of four boys and three girls.

One who met Nelson during his 1936 New York City campaign stop recalled him:

"George Nelson is not one of the usual 'politician' types — a hail fellow well met one minute, a very exclusive, self-important individual the next. As he is on the platform, I can picture him on the farm. And the same kindly, unassuming ways that bespeak him a good neighbor, bespeak him a genuine comrade of the party. The word, comrade, on his lips is a heart-felt recognition of the need of one man for another, a need which capitalism exploits but which genuine Socialism serves."

== Works ==
- The Farce of Farm Relief. With Carrie Eddie Sheffler. Chicago: Socialist Party of America, n.d. [c. 1934].
- Farmers: Where Are We Going? Chicago: Socialist Party of America, 1934.

== Footnotes ==
Party political offices
Preceded by Frank Metcalfe	Socialist nominee for Governor of Wisconsin; 1934	Succeeded by Frank Zeidler (1942)
Preceded by James H. Maurer	Socialist nominee for Vice President of the United States; 1936	Succeeded by Maynard C. Krueger
Preceded by Henry Gunderson	Progressive nominee for Lieutenant Governor of Wisconsin; 1938	Succeeded by Anton M. Miller
Wisconsin State Assembly
Preceded by Axel Johnson	Member of the Wisconsin State Assembly from the Polk County district January 3, 1921 – January 3, 1927	Succeeded by E. E. Husband
Preceded by Herman W. Sachtjen	Speaker of the Wisconsin State Assembly; April 15, 1926 – January 3, 1927	Succeeded by John W. Eber
