= Lake Lawn Airport =

Airport in Wisconsin, United States

- IATA: none; ICAO: none; FAA LID: C59

Summary
- Airport type: Public
- Owner: Delevan Lake Lawn Management
- Serves: Delavan, Wisconsin
- Opened: April 1974
- Time zone: CST (UTC−06:00)
  - Summer (DST): CDT (UTC−05:00)
- Elevation AMSL: 981 ft (299 m)
- Coordinates: 42°38′03″N 088°36′04″W

Map
- Location of airport in Wisconsin C59 (the United States)

Runways
Direction	Length		Surface
Direction	ft	m	Surface
18/36	4,423	1,348	Asphalt

Statistics
- Aircraft operations (2023): 1,300
- Based aircraft (2024): 0
- Source: Federal Aviation Administration

Lake Lawn Airport, (FAA LID: C59) is a privately owned public use airport located 2 miles (3.2 km) east of the central business district of Delavan, Wisconsin, a city in Walworth County, Wisconsin, United States. The airport is part of the Lake Lawn Resort.

Although most airports in the United States use the same three-letter location identifier for the FAA and International Air Transport Association (IATA), this airport is assigned C59 by the FAA but has no designation from the IATA.

The airport does not have scheduled airline service. The closest airport with scheduled airline service is General Mitchell International Airport, about 42 miles (68 km) to the northeast.

== Facilities and aircraft ==
Lake Lawn Airport covers an area of 40 acres (16 ha) at an elevation of 981 feet (299 m) above mean sea level. It has one runway: 18/36 is 4,423 by 80 feet (1,348 x 24 m) with an asphalt surface.

For the 12-month period ending June 9, 2023, the airport had 1,300 aircraft operations, an average of 25 per week: 96% general aviation, 2% air taxi and 2% military.

In July 2024, there were no aircraft based at this airport.

== See also ==
- List of airports in Wisconsin
