= Frank B. James =

United States Air Force general (1912–2004)

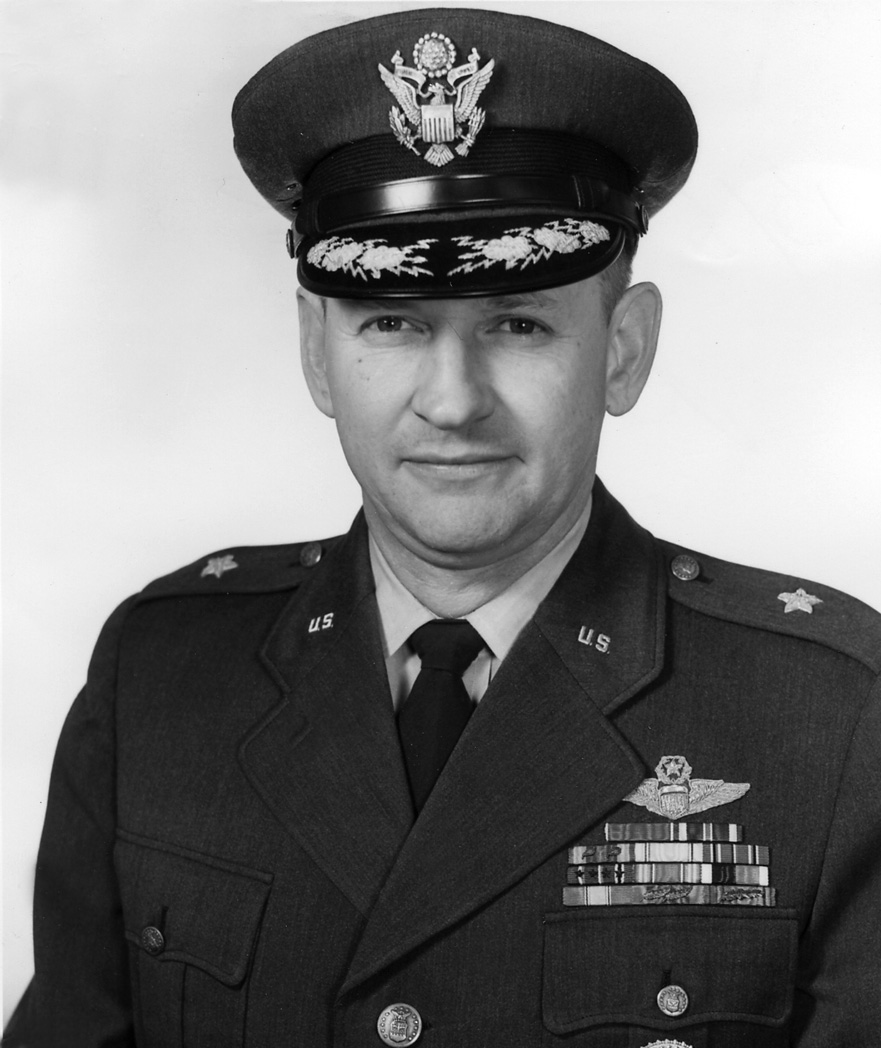
- Brigadier General Frank B. James
- Born: March 21, 1912; Delavan, Wisconsin
- Died: December 9, 2004 (aged 92); Palm Harbor, Florida
- Burial place: Arlington National Cemetery
- Military career
- Allegiance: United States of America
- Branch: United States Air Force
- Service years: 1937–1968
- Rank: Brigadier General
- Commands: 55th Fighter Group
- Conflicts: World War II
- Awards: Legion of Merit; Distinguished Flying Cross; Air Medal (3)

Frank B. James (March 21, 1912 – December 9, 2004) was a brigadier general in the United States Air Force.

== Early life ==
James was born on March 21, 1912, in Delavan, Wisconsin. In 1937, he graduated with a B.A. from the University of California, Los Angeles.

== Army Air Corps ==
James joined the United States Army Air Corps in 1937. In June 1938, he graduated from the Advanced Flying School at Kelly and received his pilot's wings and the rank of second lieutenant. His first assignment was with the 79th Pursuit Squadron, 20th Pursuit Group.

== World War II ==
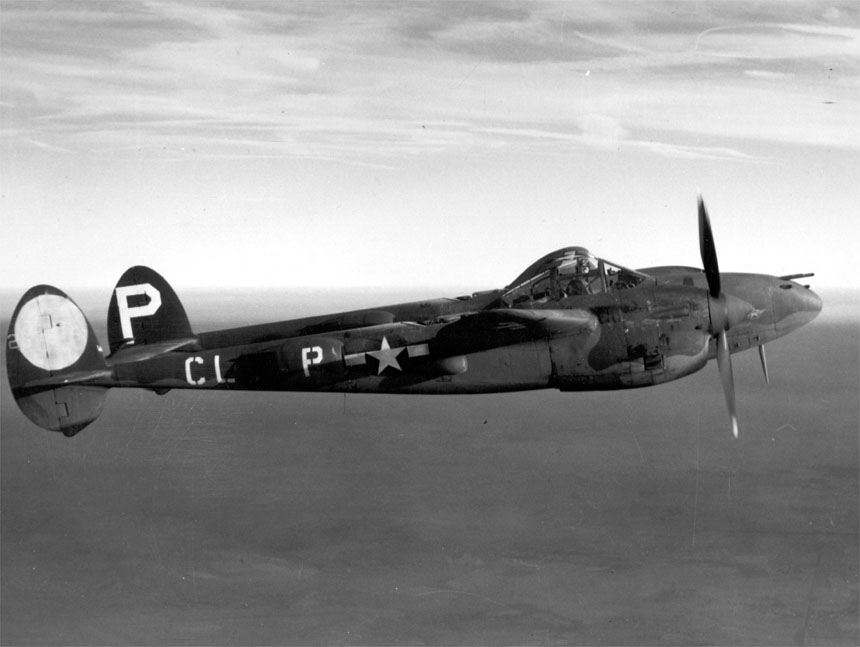
P-38 Lightning of the 55th Fighter Group

In 1941, he was named commanding officer of the 50th Flying Training Squadron, 14th Fighter Group. He took command of the 55th Fighter Group in 1943. It was during this time that the 55th Fighter Group was deployed to the United Kingdom to take part in World War II.

James became Chief of Combat Operations, Headquarters VIII Fighter Command, Eighth Air Force in March 1944. In October 1944, James was named Director of Fighter, Headquarters Eighth Air Force. He held this position until January 1945, when he was named Director of Operations, Headquarters Eighth Air Force.

== Cold War ==
Following his service in the war, James became commanding officer of McChord Field and was a member of the faculty at the Air Command and Staff College. He graduated from the Armed Forces Staff College in 1948 and held a faculty position there until 1950, when he was appointed U.S. Air Attaché to the Embassy of the United States in Moscow.

In 1951, James was named Assistant Chief of Staff for Intelligence and Assistant Chief of Staff for Operations, Headquarters Twelfth Air Force. James graduated from the Air War College in 1954 and that same year was named Air Force Assistant Director, Joint Intelligence Group, Joint Staff of the Joint Chiefs of Staff.

In 1956 James was again appointed U.S. Air Attaché, this time to the Embassy of the United States in London. Following that assignment, James was named Deputy Chief of Staff-Intelligence and Deputy Chief of Staff-Programs of the North American Aerospace Defense Command. His retirement was effective as of June 1, 1968.

== Death ==
After retirement, James lived in Oldsmar, Florida and died on December 9, 2004 in Palm Harbor. He and his wife Laverle F. (1916–1988) are buried at Arlington National Cemetery.

== Awards ==
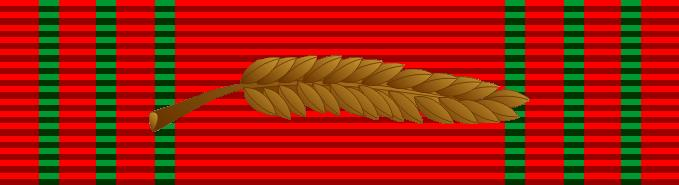
USAF Command pilot badge
Legion of Merit
Distinguished Flying Cross
Air Medal with two bronze oak leaf clusters
French Croix de Guerre with two Palms
Belgian Croix de Guerre with Palm
