= Frank E. Lawson =

American politician

Frank E. Lawson (born August 9, 1868, in Delavan, Wisconsin) was a member of the Wisconsin State Assembly. Lawson was elected to the Assembly in 1922, 1924 and 1926. Additionally, he was Town Clerk of Walworth (town), Wisconsin and President of the Village Board (similar to city council) of Walworth, Wisconsin. He was a Republican.
