= Unity, Trempealeau County, Wisconsin =

Unity, Wisconsin
- Town
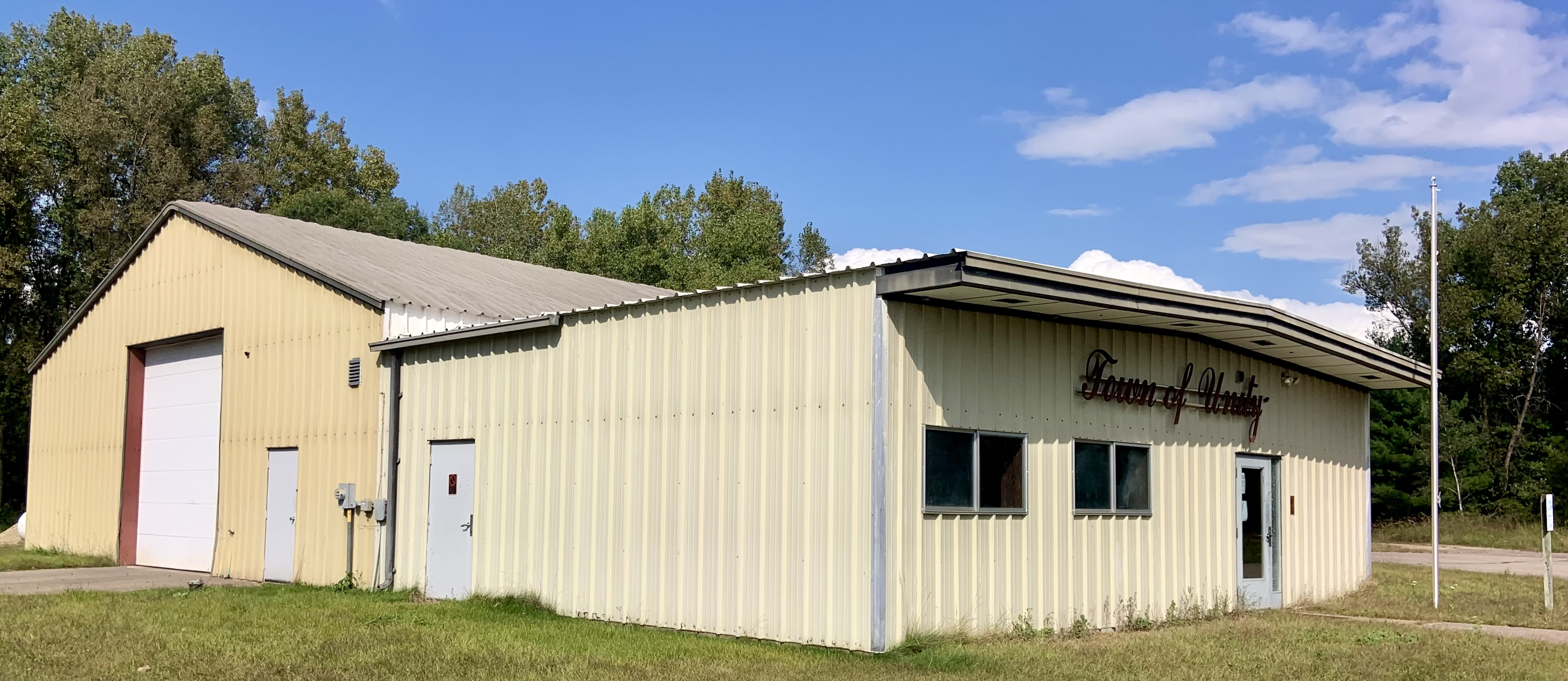
- Town hall near Strum

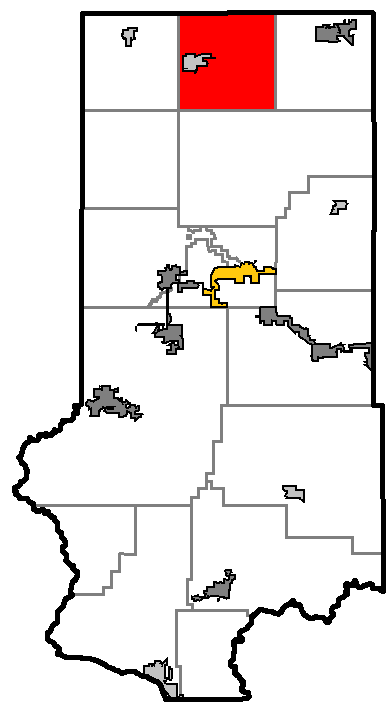
- Location of Unity, Trempealeau County, Wisconsin

- Location of Trempealeau County, Wisconsin
- Coordinates: 44°33′4″N 91°21′42″W
- Country: United States
- State: Wisconsin
- County: Trempealeau

Area
  - Total: 34.6 sq mi (89.6 km^{2})
  - Land: 34.6 sq mi (89.6 km^{2})
  - Water: 0 sq mi (0.0 km^{2})
- Elevation: 942 ft (287 m)

Population (2020)
  - Total: 511
  - Density: 14.8/sq mi (5.70/km^{2})
- Time zone: UTC-6 (Central (CST))
  - Summer (DST): UTC-5 (CDT)
- FIPS code: 55-81875
- GNIS feature ID: 1584320

Unity is a town in Trempealeau County, Wisconsin, United States. The population was 511 at the 2020 census.

== Geography ==
According to the United States Census Bureau, the town has a total area of 34.6 square miles (89.6 km^{2}), all land.

== Demographics ==
As of the census of 2000, there were 556 people, 200 households, and 166 families residing in the town. The population density was 16.1 people per square mile (6.2/km^{2}). There were 218 housing units at an average density of 6.3 per square mile (2.4/km^{2}). The racial makeup of the town was 99.64% White, and 0.36% from two or more races. Hispanic or Latino of any race were 0.72% of the population.

There were 200 households, out of which 41.0% had children under the age of 18 living with them, 70.5% were married couples living together, 3.5% had a female householder with no husband present, and 17.0% were non-families. 15.5% of all households were made up of individuals, and 6.0% had someone living alone who was 65 years of age or older. The average household size was 2.78 and the average family size was 3.07.

In the town, the population was 29.3% under the age of 18, 5.6% from 18 to 24, 31.3% from 25 to 44, 24.6% from 45 to 64, and 9.2% who were 65 years of age or older. The median age was 37 years. For every 100 females, there were 118.9 males. For every 100 females age 18 and over, there were 123.3 males.

The median income for a household in the town was $46,736, and the median income for a family was $48,068. Males had a median income of $31,696 versus $23,571 for females. The per capita income for the town was $16,967. About 1.7% of families and 2.4% of the population were below the poverty line, including 1.8% of those under age 18 and 4.1% of those age 65 or over.
