= Charles Judd (politician) =

American politician

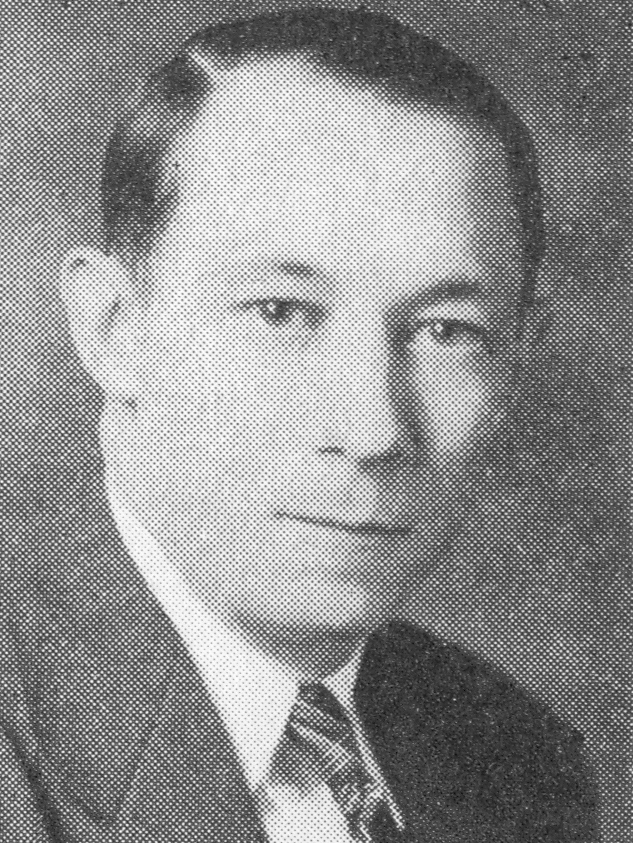
Judd circa 1940

Charles H. Judd (May 11, 1900 – March 16, 1973) was a member of the Wisconsin State Assembly.

== Biography ==
Judd was born on May 11, 1900, in Walworth County, Wisconsin. During World War I, he served in the United States Army. He died on March 16, 1973.

== Political career ==
Judd was a member of the Assembly from 1939 to 1940. He was a Republican.
