= Marcus E. Johnson =

American politician

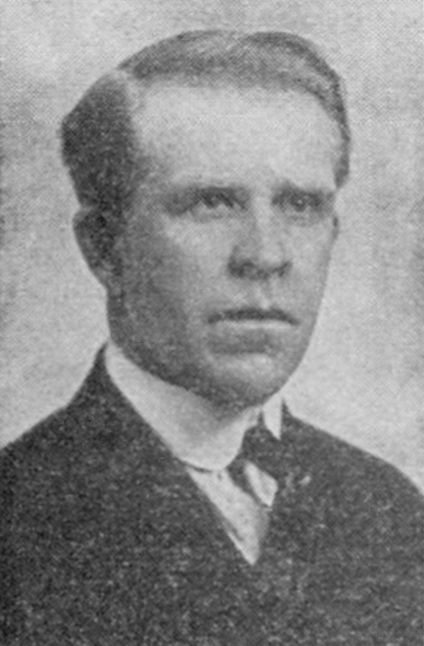

Member of the Wisconsin State Assembly
- In office 1919

Personal details
- Born: March 12, 1887 Dane County, Wisconsin, US
- Died: March 3, 1947 (aged 59) Madison, Wisconsin, US
- Party: Republican
- Occupation: Carpenter, teacher

Marcus E. Johnson (March 12, 1887 – March 3, 1947) was a member of the Wisconsin State Assembly.

== Biography ==
Johnson was born on March 12, 1887, in Dane County, Wisconsin. He would become an instructor at the University of Wisconsin–Madison.

He died in Madison, Wisconsin on March 3, 1947.

== Political career ==
Johnson was elected to the Assembly in 1918. Additionally, he was a Madison alderman (similar to city councilman). He was a Republican.
