= Lawrence C. Whittet =

American politician and businessman

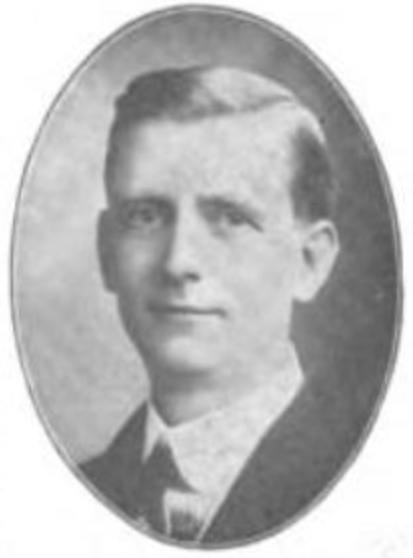

Member of the Wisconsin State Assembly
- Constituency: Rock County First District
- In office 1908–1910
- In office 1914–1920

Personal details
- Born: Lawrence Clarke Whittet; June 16, 1871 Albion, Dane County, Wisconsin
- Died: July 15, 1954 (aged 83) Edgerton, Wisconsin
- Party: Republican
- Education: University of Wisconsin
- Occupation: Businessman, politician

Lawrence Clarke Whittet (June 16, 1871 – July 15, 1954) was an American politician and businessman.

Born in the town of Albion, Dane County, Wisconsin, Whittet moved from a farm in Jefferson County, Wisconsin with his parents to Edgerton, Wisconsin. Whittet graduated from Edgerton High School and went to University of Wisconsin. Whittet and his brother owned the family business, a lumber yard and fuel business. Whittet served on the Rock County, Wisconsin Board of Education and on the board of education. He was postmaster in Edgerton. Whittet also served on the Edgerton Library Board. He was a Republican. In 1909 and from 1915 to 1919, Whittet served in the Wisconsin State Assembly and was speaker of the Assembly in 1917. Whittet then served as executive secretary for Wisconsin Governor Emanuel L. Philipp. Governor Albert Schmedeman appointed Whittet Wisconsin state director of the National Recovery Administration. Governor Philip La Follette appointed Whittet in charge of the state inspection and enforcement bureau. He was the supervisor of the oil inspection bureau under Governors Julius Heil and Walter Goodland. He was also executive director of the Association of Commerce in Milwaukee, Wisconsin. Whittet retired in 1949. Whittet died from pneumonia at his home in Edgerton, Wisconsin.
