= Frank Chermak =

20th century American politician

Franciscus "Frank" Chermak (September 20, 1893 – February 23, 1954) was a Slovak American immigrant, businessman, and Democratic politician. He was a member of the Wisconsin State Assembly, representing southeast Milwaukee County in the 1933–1934 session.

== Biography ==
Chermak was born on September 20, 1893, in Austria-Hungary. He later moved to Cudahy, Wisconsin.

== Career ==
Chermak was elected to the Assembly in 1932. He was a Democrat.
