= James W. Higgins =

American politician

James William Higgins (September 6, 1896 – February 15, 1945) was an American businessman and legislator.

Born in Milwaukee, Wisconsin in September 1896, he graduated from East Side High School (now Riverside University High School). Higgins served in the United States Navy during World War I and was a United States Food Administrator. He was manager of cleaning and dyeing businesses. He was also manager of the Orpheum Circuit Theatres and was a press agent. He served in the Wisconsin State Assembly in 1933 as a Democrat. He died on February 15, 1945, at the age of 48.
