= Delavan, Wisconsin =

- City
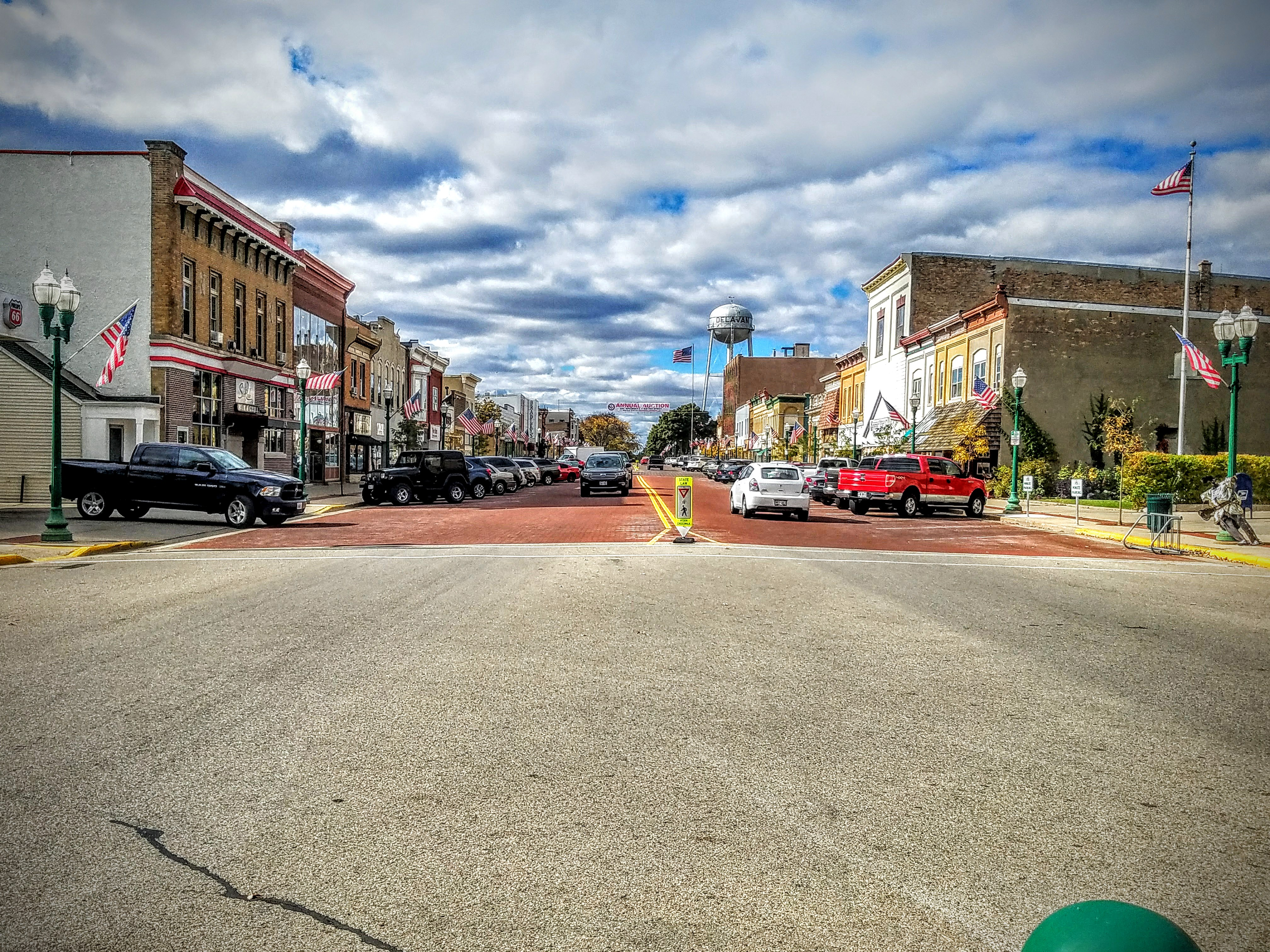
- Looking west towards downtown Delavan
- Motto: 19th Century Circus Capital of America
- Location of Delavan in Walworth County, Wisconsin

- Location within Wisconsin Location within the United States
- Coordinates: 42°37′59″N 88°38′37″W
- Country: United States
- State: Wisconsin
- County: Walworth County
- Incorporated (village): March 31, 1856
- Incorporated (city): July 21, 1897

Area
  - Total: 7.43 sq mi (19.24 km^{2})
  - Land: 6.97 sq mi (18.05 km^{2})
  - Water: 0.46 sq mi (1.19 km^{2}) 6.37%
- Elevation: 925 ft (282 m)

Population (2020)
  - Total: 8,505
  - Estimate (2021): 8,594
  - Density: 1,220.6/sq mi (471.3/km^{2})
- Time zone: UTC-6 (CST)
- ZIP Code: 53115
- Area code: 262
- FIPS code: 55-19450
- Website: ci.delavan.wi.us

Delavan is a city in Walworth County, Wisconsin, United States. The population was 8,505 at the 2020 census. It is located 45 miles (72 km) southwest of Milwaukee. The city is located partially within the Town of Delavan, but the two entities are politically independent. Delavan is home to Delavan Lake which brings in a large number of tourists each year, and is also close to Lake Geneva, another popular tourist destination.

== History ==
=== Origins ===
Delavan sits in the middle of what was once an inland sea. During the last ice age, the final glaciation, named the Michigan tongue, covered this region. The Michigan tongue descended along the area of Lake Michigan. The "Delavan lobe" of this glacier broke off, pushing southwest into the area of Walworth County.

The first humans known to inhabit the Delavan area were Native Americans around 1000 BCE. Later, between 500 and 1000 CE, Mound Builders lived in what is now the Delavan Lake area. Mound Builders were of the Woodland culture. The effigy mounds they erected along the shores of Delavan Lake numbered well over 200, according to an archeological survey done in the late 19th century by Beloit College. Many were along the north shore of the lake where Lake Lawn Resort now stands. The Potawotomi Indians settled around the lake in the late 18th century, although there were only an estimated 240 in the county. Some of their burial mounds are preserved in what is now Assembly Park.

From the mid-17th century through the mid-18th century, Delavan was part of "New France". It came under British rule in the Province of Quebec following the French and Indian War. In accordance with the Treaty of Paris (1783), it was turned over to the United States and became part of the newly established Northwest Territory.

=== American era ===
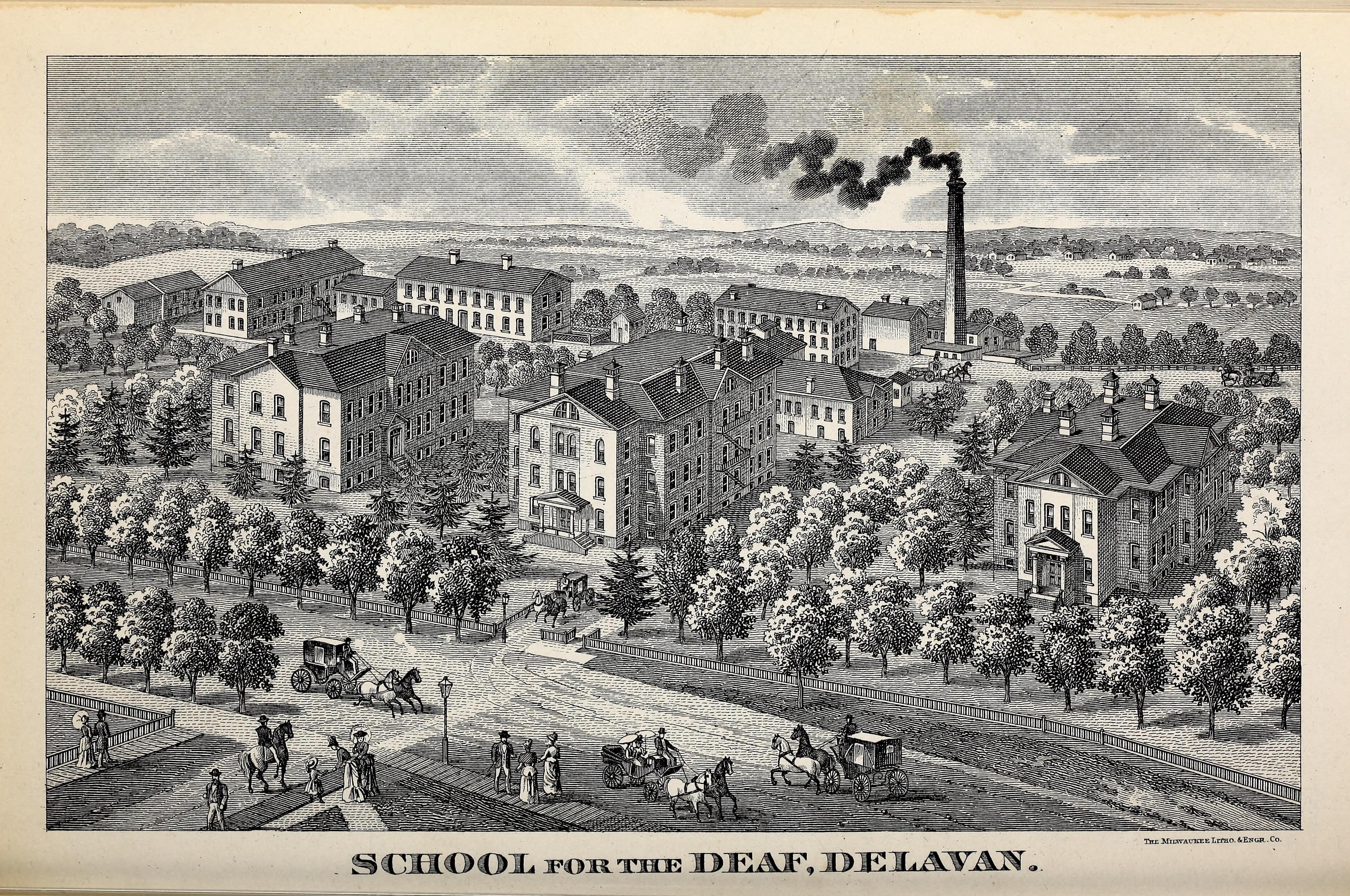
Illustration of the school for the deaf and surrounding area, published 1893

Between 1800 and 1836, the Delavan area was part of the Indiana Territory, followed by the Illinois Territory, finally becoming part of the Wisconsin Territory in 1836. Statehood was granted to Wisconsin in 1848.

Between 1847 and 1894, Delavan was home to 26 circus companies. The Mabie Brothers U.S. Olympic Circus, then the largest in America, arrived in 1847, to become the first circus to quarter in the territory of Wisconsin. Its famous rogue elephant, "Romeo", stood 10 1/2 feet (3.20 m) high, and 10,500 pounds (4,800 kg). The original P. T. Barnum Circus was organized here in 1871 by William C. Coup and Dan Costello. Over 130 members of Delavan's 19th century circus colony are buried in Spring Grove and St. Andrew cemeteries.

On July 21, 1948, Delavan was the site of Wisconsin's Circus Centennial as part of the state's celebration of 100 years of statehood. On May 2, 1966, Delavan was selected by the U.S. Post Office to issue on a first day cover basis, the five-cent American Circus commemorative postage stamp.

== Geography ==
Delavan is located at 42°39′N 88°38′W (42.630689, -88.638108).

According to the United States Census Bureau, the city has a total area of 7.22 square miles (18.70 km^{2}), of which 6.76 square miles (17.51 km^{2}) is land (94%) and 0.46 square miles (1.19 km^{2}) is water (6%).

== Demographics ==
Historical population
Census	Pop.	Note	%±
1860	1,549		—
1870	1,688		9.0%
1880	1,798		6.5%
1890	2,038		13.3%
1900	2,244		10.1%
1910	2,450		9.2%
1920	3,016		23.1%
1930	3,301		9.4%
1940	3,444		4.3%
1950	4,007		16.3%
1960	4,846		20.9%
1970	5,526		14.0%
1980	5,684		2.9%
1990	6,073		6.8%
2000	7,956		31.0%
2010	8,463		6.4%
2020	8,505		0.5%
U.S. Decennial Census; 2010–2020

=== 2010 census ===
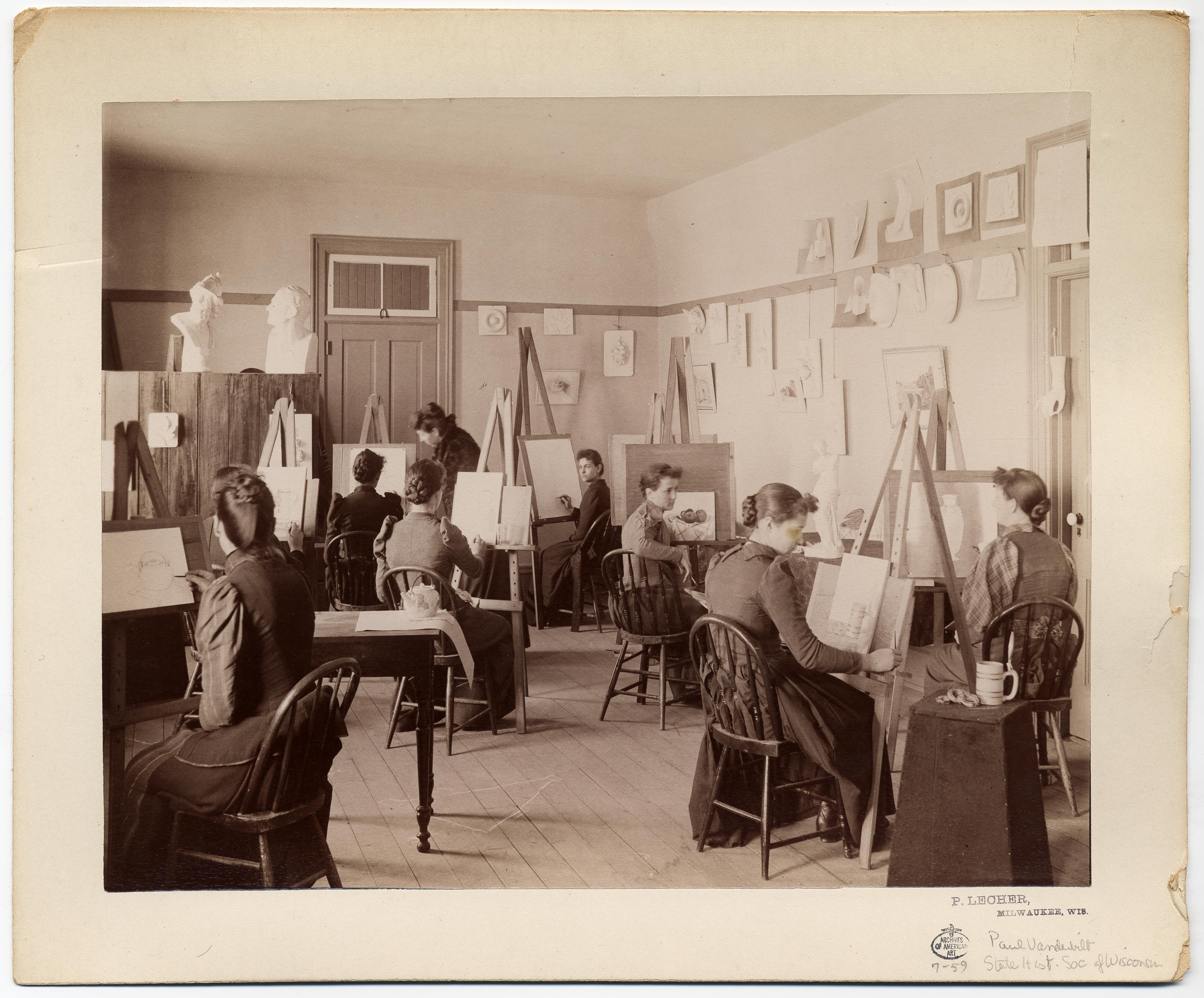
Art students at the State School for the Deaf, Delavan

As of the census of 2010, there were 8,463 people, 3,189 households, and 2,079 families residing in the city. The population density was 1,251.9 inhabitants per square mile (483.4/km^{2}). There were 3,500 housing units at an average density of 517.8 per square mile (199.9/km^{2}). The racial makeup of the city was 81.2% White, 1.7% African American, 0.7% Native American, 1.0% Asian, 12.7% from other races, and 2.6% from two or more races. Hispanic or Latino people of any race were 29.4% of the population.

There were 3,189 households, of which 36.9% had children under the age of 18 living with them, 44.9% were married couples living together, 14.1% had a female householder with no husband present, 6.1% had a male householder with no wife present, and 34.8% were non-families. 28.4% of all households were made up of individuals, and 11.9% had someone living alone who was 65 years of age or older. The average household size was 2.63 and the average family size was 3.25.

The median age in the city was 33.5 years. 28.1% of residents were under the age of 18; 9% were between the ages of 18 and 24; 26.8% were from 25 to 44; 23.5% were from 45 to 64; and 12.7% were 65 years of age or older. The gender makeup of the city was 49.3% male and 50.7% female.

== Economy ==
One of the major manufacturing and industrial centers of Walworth County, Delavan is home to over 230 businesses including such companies as Borg Indak, Pentair, Andes Candies, Waukesha Cherry-Burrell, Ajay Leisure Products and Outboard Marine Corp.

City events include the Delavan Train Show in March, Cinco de Mayo in May, and Scarecrow Fest in September.

== Education ==
The local school district has two elementary schools, Phoenix Middle School and Delavan Darien High School. There are also three private schools: St. Andrew's Parish School (Catholic), Our Redeemer Lutheran School, and Delavan Christian School (interdenominational). The Wisconsin School for the Deaf is located in Delavan.

== Transportation ==
Delavan was a stop on the Racine & Southwestern branch line of the Chicago, Milwaukee, St. Paul and Pacific Railroad, better known as the Milwaukee Road. In its 1980 bankruptcy, the Milwaukee Road disposed of the Southwestern Line. The Wisconsin and Southern Railroad continues to service Delavan from a connection at Bardwell to the west.

== Notable Buildings ==
=== Citizens Bank of Delavan ===
- Built in 1904, The bank was originally founded on March 14, 1875, by Thomas Perry James and associates.

== Notable Persons ==
- George M. Borg, Wisconsin State Senator
- William J. Borucki, space scientist
- Gary Burghoff, actor
- Willard H. Chandler, Wisconsin State Senator
- William Avery Cochrane, Wisconsin State Representative
- Roberta Cordano, 11th President of Gallaudet University
- Frank V. Dudley, landscape artist
- Ned Hollister, zoologist
- Carl Isaacs Jr., formerly unidentified decedent
- Willard W. Isham, Wisconsin State Representative
- Frank B. James, U.S. Air Force general
- Dave Kraayeveld, NFL player
- Daniel E. La Bar, Wisconsin State Representative
- Frank E. Lawson, Wisconsin State Representative
- William Merriam, Wisconsin State Representative
- William Moxley, U.S. Representative from Illinois
- Richard Quinney, sociologist
- Ora R. Rice, Speaker of the Wisconsin State Assembly
- Webb Schultz, MLB player
- Albert E. Smith, Wisconsin State Representative
- Alfred Delavan Thomas, United States District Court judge, North Dakota
- Scott Walker, Wisconsin State Governor
- Riley S. Young, Speaker of the Wisconsin State Assembly

== Gallery ==
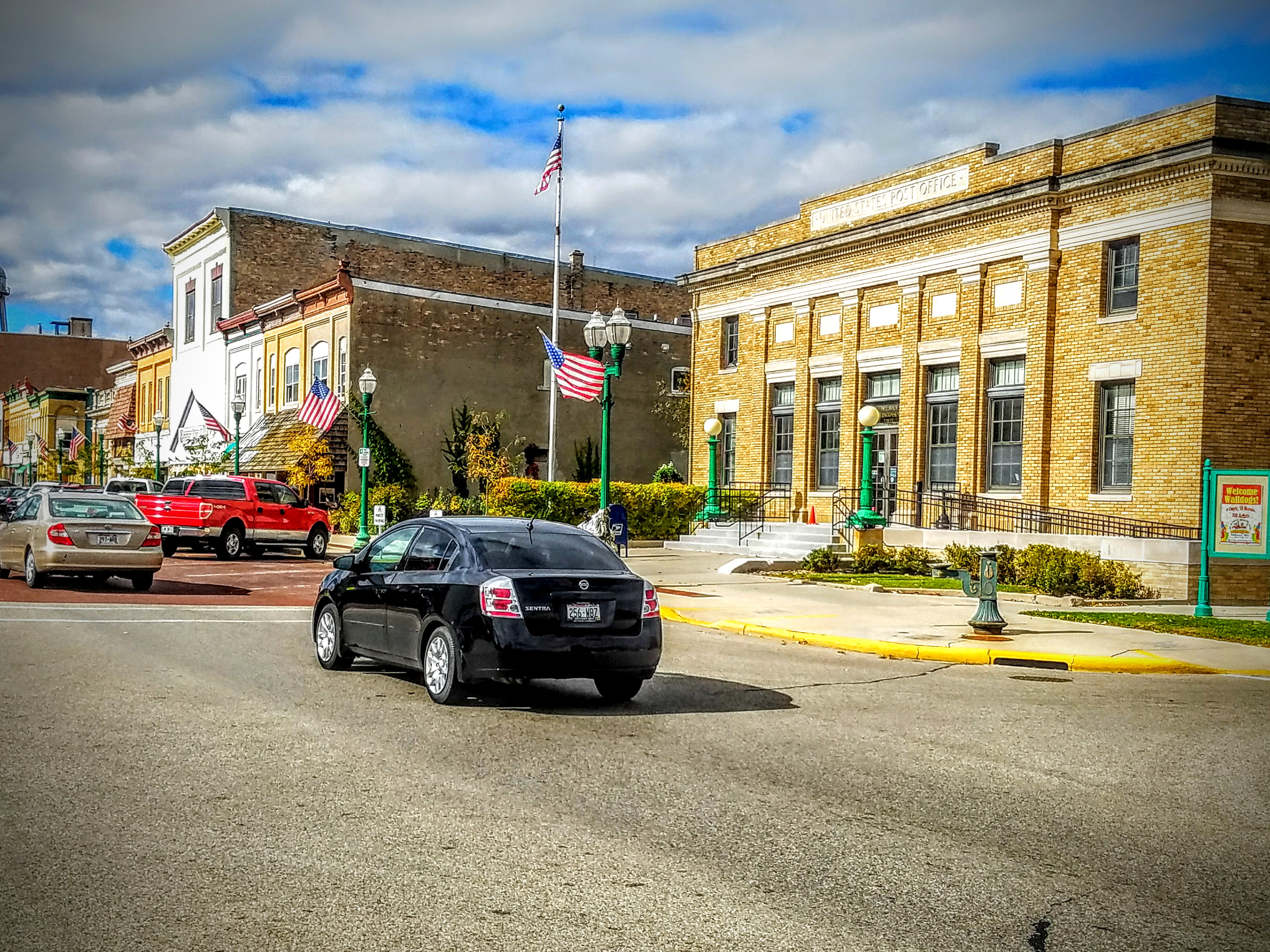
Downtown Delavan in the Fall

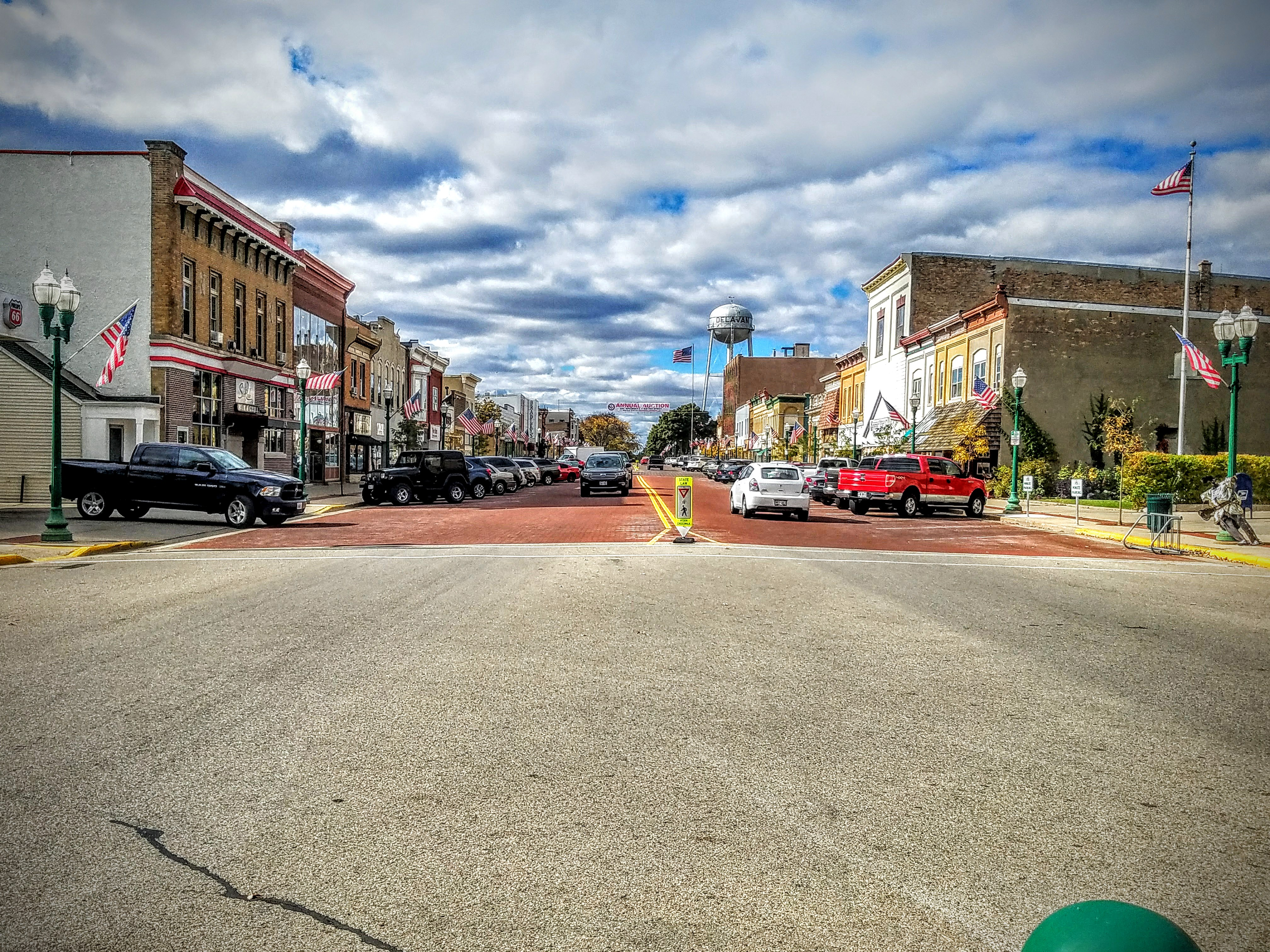
Looking West Towards Downtown

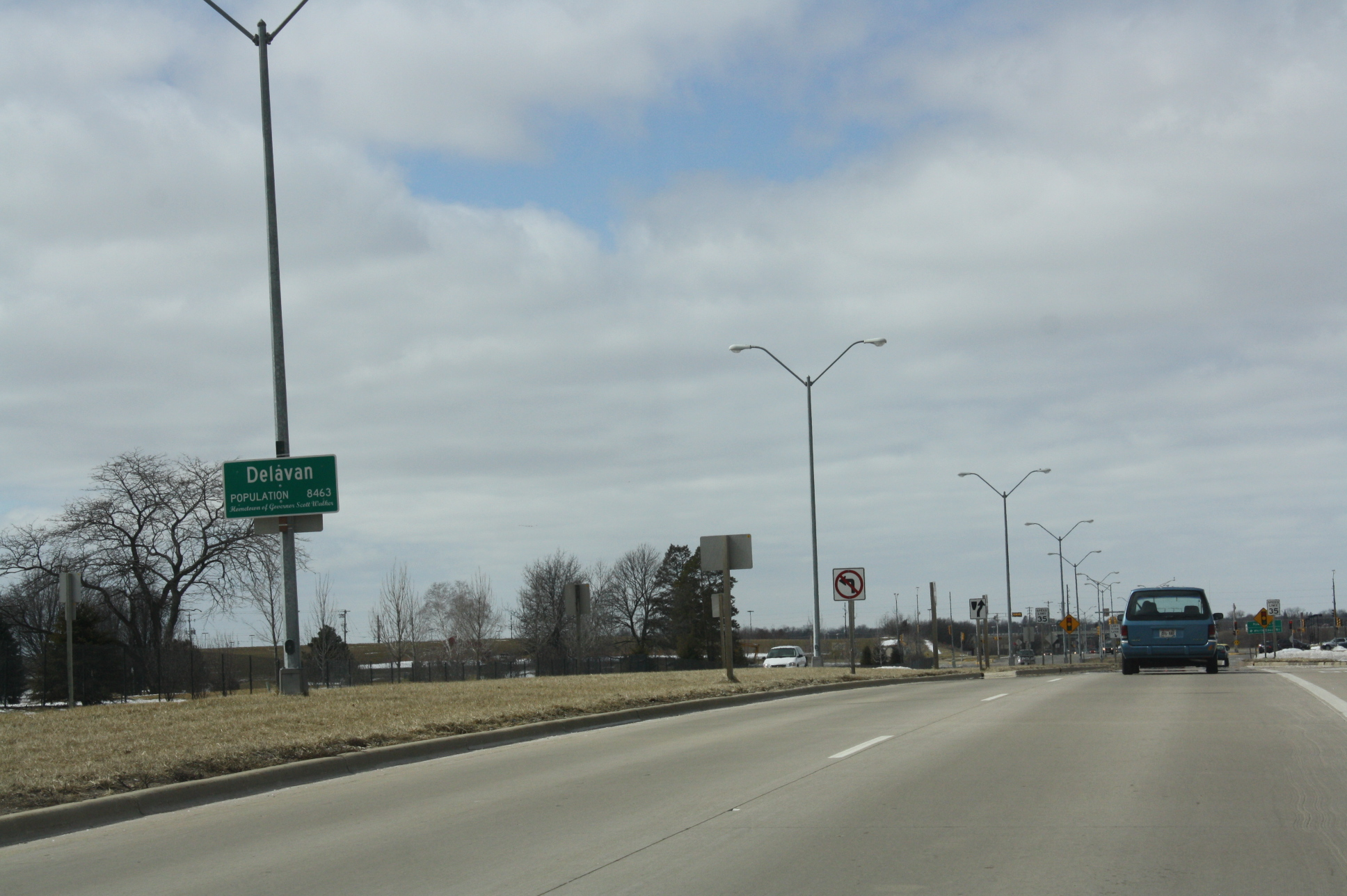
Delavan sign

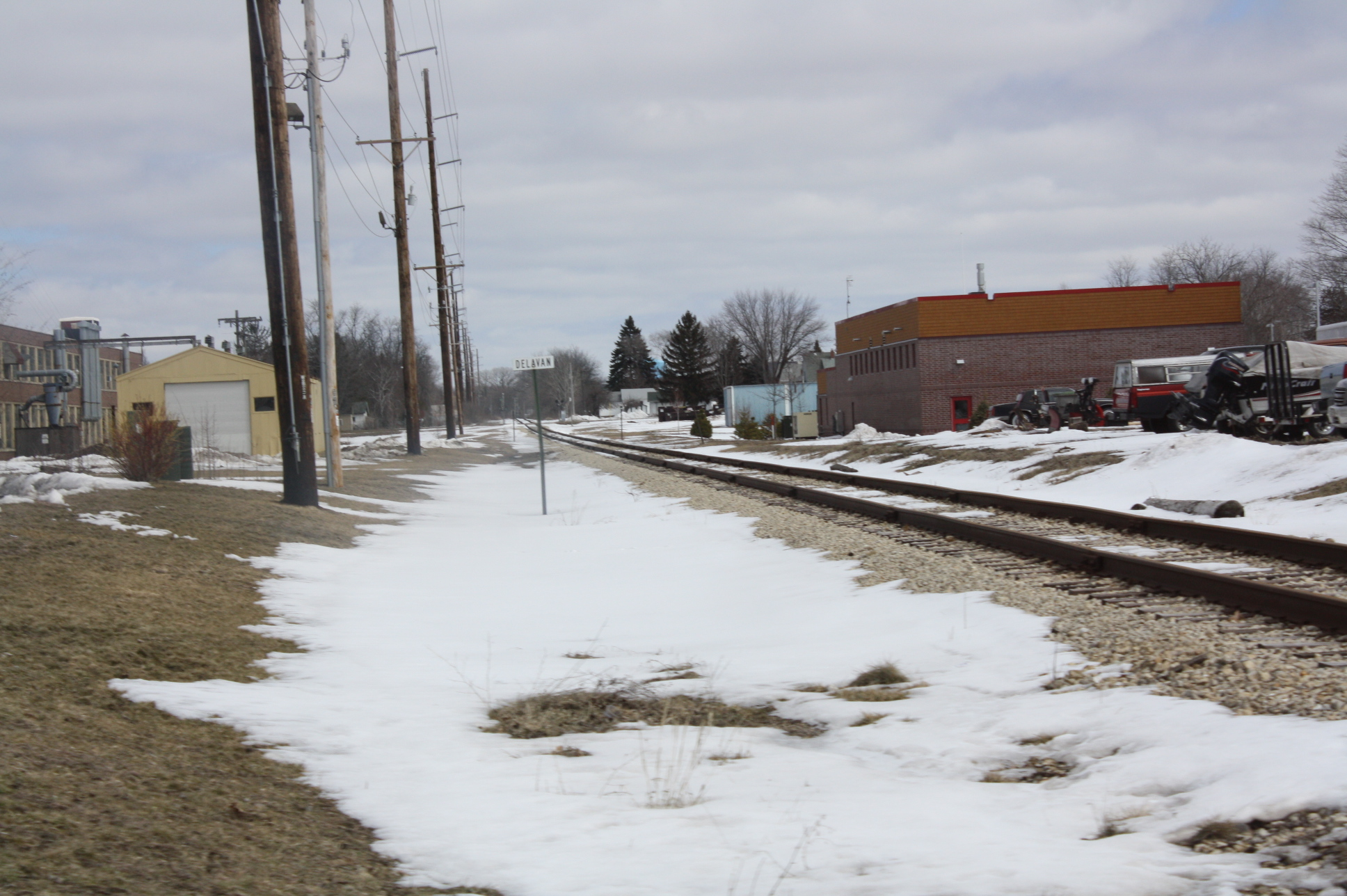
Railroad tracks in Delavan

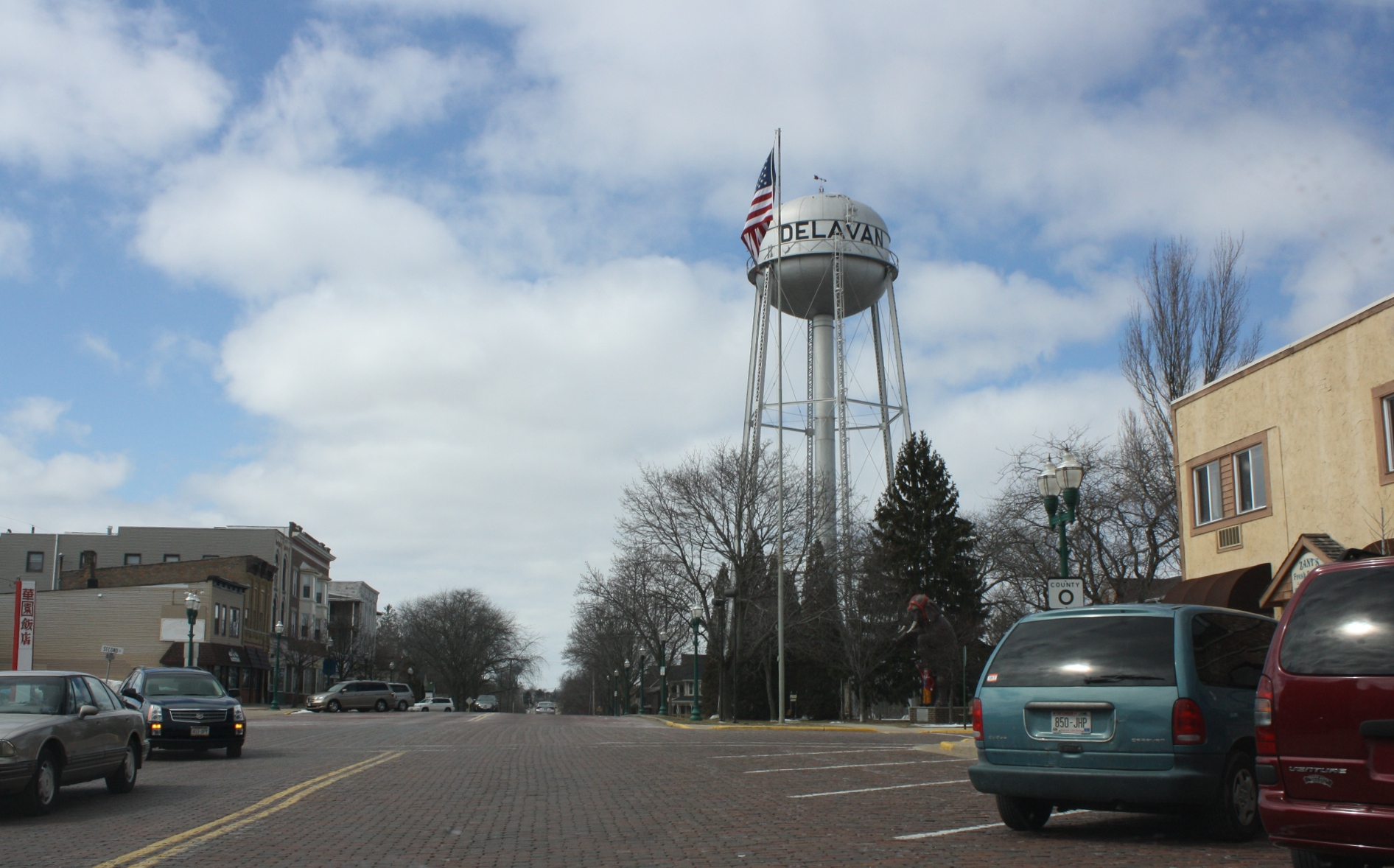
Water tower and Delavan's Vitrified Brick Street
