= 78th Wisconsin Legislature =

Wisconsin legislative term for 1967–1968

←	77th	79th	→
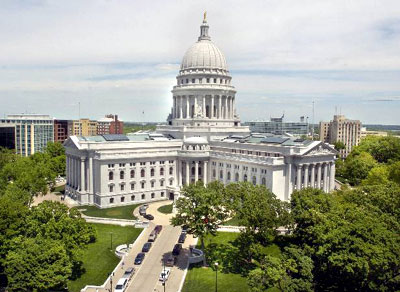
- Wisconsin State Capitol

Overview
- Legislative body: Wisconsin Legislature
- Meeting place: Wisconsin State Capitol
- Term: January 2, 1967 – January 6, 1969
- Election: November 8, 1966

Senate
- Members: 33
- Senate President: Jack B. Olson (R)
- President pro tempore: Robert P. Knowles (R)
- Party control: Republican

Assembly
- Members: 100
- Assembly Speaker: Harold V. Froehlich (R)
- Speaker pro tempore: Elmer C. Nitschke (R)
- Party control: Republican

Sessions
- Regular: January 11, 1967 – January 6, 1969

The Seventy-Eighth Wisconsin Legislature convened from January 11, 1967, to January 6, 1969, in regular session.

This session saw the culmination of Governor Warren P. Knowles state government reorganization and modernization plan, including the passage of the signature government reorganization law, which consolidated 85 executive branch agencies into 32 executive departments, and the passage of twelve amendments to the state constitution (the most in any single legislative session).

Senators representing odd-numbered districts were newly elected for this session and were serving the first two years of a four-year term. Assembly members were elected to a two-year term. Assembly members and odd-numbered senators were elected in the general election of November 8, 1966. Senators representing even-numbered districts were serving the third and fourth year of a four-year term, having been elected in the general election of November 3, 1964.

The governor of Wisconsin during this entire term was Republican Warren P. Knowles, of St. Croix County, serving his second two-year term, having won re-election in the 1966 Wisconsin gubernatorial election.

== Major events ==
- January 2, 1967: Second inauguration of Warren P. Knowles as Governor of Wisconsin.
- January 15, 1967: The Green Bay Packers won Super Bowl I.
- January 27, 1967: An accidental fire destroyed Apollo 1 during a launch rehearsal at Cape Canaveral, killing all three astronauts assigned to the mission.
- February 10, 1967: The Twenty-fifth Amendment to the United States Constitution came into force when a sufficient number of states ratified.
- March 4, 1967: Wisconsin Supreme Court justice Myron L. Gordon resigned after he was confirmed as a United States district judge for the Eastern District of Wisconsin.
- March 13, 1967: Wisconsin governor Warren P. Knowles appointed county judge Connor Hansen to the Wisconsin Supreme Court, to succeed Myron L. Gordon.
- April 4, 1967: 1967 Wisconsin Spring election:
  - Robert W. Hansen was elected to the Wisconsin Supreme Court, defeating incumbent chief justice George R. Currie. He was the only Wisconsin chief justice ever defeated seeking re-election.
  - Wisconsin voters ratified eight amendments to the state constitution:
    - Combining the election of governor and lieutenant governor into a single ticket election rather than two separate elections.
    - Doubling the term of the governor and lieutenant governor to four years from two.
    - Doubling the term of the secretary of state to four years from two.
    - Doubling the term of the attorney general to four years from two.
    - Doubling the term of the state treasurer to four years from two.
    - Abolishing term limits for sheriffs.
    - Adding section 23 to Article I of the constitution, establishing that the prohibition on sectarian instruction in public education should not prevent state entities from paying for transportation for children to attend private schools.
    - Allowing for judicial salary increases to take effect during the immediate term, rather than waiting until after the next election.
- July 30, 1967: A fight between teenagers in Milwaukee escalated into the 1967 Milwaukee riot—one of 159 race riots which swept the country in the long, hot summer of 1967.
- August 30, 1967: The United States Senate confirmed Thurgood Marshall as an associate justice of the United States Supreme Court, making him the first African American to serve on the court.
- October 18, 1967: A student anti-war protest on the campus of the University of Wisconsin–Madison devolved into a riot, injuring 76 people.
- December 31, 1967: The Green Bay Packers defeated the Dallas Cowboys in the 1967 NFL Championship Game. The game was referred to as "the Ice Bowl" due to the game-time temperature of −15 °F (−36 °F wind chill).
- January 1, 1968: E. Harold Hallows became the 20th chief justice of the Wisconsin Supreme Court by rule of seniority, at the expiration of the term of chief justice George R. Currie.
- January 14, 1968: The Green Bay Packers won Super Bowl II.
- March 31, 1968: U.S. president Lyndon B. Johnson announced, during a speech about the status of the Vietnam War, that he would not run for another term as president.
- April 2, 1968: 1968 Wisconsin Spring election:
  - Wisconsin voters ratified four amendments to the state constitution:
    - Allowing the legislature to hold more than one session per biennium.
    - Allowing the legislature to set a uniform retirement age for state judges.
    - Clarifying that a judge may serve in a temporary role by appointment beyond the retirement age.
    - Allowing for appropriations for forestry improvements from funding sources other than a property tax.
- April 4, 1968: Martin Luther King Jr. was assassinated in Memphis, Tennessee.
- June 6, 1968: Democratic presidential candidate Robert F. Kennedy was assassinated in Los Angeles, California.
- November 5, 1968: 1968 United States general election:
  - Richard Nixon (R) elected President of the United States.
  - Warren P. Knowles (R) re-elected to a third term as Governor of Wisconsin.
  - Gaylord Nelson (D) re-elected United States senator from Wisconsin.

== Major legislation ==
- July 19, 1967: An Act to provide for the functional reorganization of the executive branch of Wisconsin state government by the orderly transfer of all functions now assigned by law to the 91 separate departments of the executive branch into a streamlined new structure of constitutional offices, operating departments, and independent institutions and agencies, and to make appropriations, 1967 Act 75. This was the signature legislative package of the major executive branch reorganization, championed by governor Warren P. Knowles. It reorganized the state executive branch into 32 executive agencies, down from 85 (or 91 by some measures).

== Party summary ==
=== Senate summary ===
Senate partisan composition Democratic: 12 seats Republican: 21 seats

	Party (Shading indicates majority caucus)		Total	
	Dem.	Rep.	Total	Vacant
End of previous Legislature	13	20	33	0
Start of Reg. Session	12	21	33	0
From Aug. 9, 1967 (Note: Republican George M. Borg (15th District) resigned.)	12	20	32	1
From Oct. 17, 1967 (Note: Republican James D. Swan (15th District) was sworn in to replace George M. Borg.)	12	21	33	0
Final voting share	36.36%	63.64%		
Beginning of the next Legislature	10	23	33	0

=== Assembly summary ===
Assembly partisan composition Democratic: 48 seats Republican: 52 seats

	Party (Shading indicates majority caucus)		Total	
	Dem.	Rep.	Total	Vacant
End of previous Legislature	53	47	100	0
Start of Reg. Session	48	52	100	0
From Jan. 10, 1967 (Note: Republican G. Fred Galli (Green & Lafayette counties) died.)	48	51	99	1
From Apr. 10, 1967 (Note: Republican Joseph E. Tregoning (Green & Lafayette counties) was sworn in to replace G. Fred Galli.)	48	52	100	0
From Jun. 22, 1967 (Note: Democrat Adrian Manders (Milwaukee County) died.)	47	52	99	1
From Aug. 11, 1967 (Note: Democrat Kenneth Kunde (Sheboygan County) resigned.)	46	52	98	2
From Oct. 15, 1967 (Note: Republican James E. Held (Milwaukee County) died.)	46	51	97	3
From Oct. 16, 1967 (Note: Democrats Carl Otte (Sheboygan County) and Verna Manders (Milwaukee County) were sworn in to replace Kenneth Kunde and Adrian Manders.)	48	51	99	1
From Oct. 27, 1967 (Note: Democrat Milton McDougal (Langlade & Oconto counties) switched his part affiliation to Republican.)	47	52	99	1
From Nov. 27, 1967 (Note: Democrat Ben A. Riehle (Marathon County) died.)	46	52	98	2
Final voting share	46.94%	53.06%		
Beginning of the next Legislature	48	52	100	0

== Sessions ==
- Regular session: January 11, 1967 – January 6, 1969

== Leaders ==
=== Senate leadership ===
- President of the Senate: Jack B. Olson (R)
- President pro tempore: Robert P. Knowles (R–New Richmond)
- Majority leader: Jerris Leonard (R–Milwaukee)
- Minority leader: Fred Risser (D–Madison)

=== Assembly leadership ===
- Speaker of the Assembly: Harold V. Froehlich (R–Appleton)
- Speaker pro tempore: Elmer C. Nitschke (R–Beaver Dam)
- Majority leader: J. Curtis McKay (R–Thiensville)
- Minority leader: Robert T. Huber (D–West Allis)

== Members ==
=== Members of the Senate ===
Members of the Senate for the Seventy-Eighth Wisconsin Legislature:

Senate partisan representation Democratic: 12 seats Republican: 21 seats

Dist.	Counties	Senator	Residence	Party
01	Door, Kewaunee, & Manitowoc	Alex Meunier	Sturgeon Bay	Rep.
02	Southern Brown & Calumet	Robert W. Warren	Green Bay	Rep.
03	Milwaukee (Southwest City)	Casimir Kendziorski	Milwaukee	Dem.
04	Milwaukee (North County)	Jerris Leonard	Milwaukee	Rep.
05	Milwaukee (Northwest City)	Wilfred Schuele	Milwaukee	Dem.
06	Milwaukee (North City)	Martin J. Schreiber	Milwaukee	Dem.
07	Milwaukee (Southeast County & Southeast City)	Leland McParland	Cudahy	Dem.
08	Milwaukee (Western County)	Allen Busby	West Milwaukee	Rep.
09	Milwaukee (City Downtown)	Norman Sussman	Milwaukee	Dem.
10	Buffalo, Burnett, Pepin, Pierce, Polk, & St. Croix	Robert P. Knowles	New Richmond	Rep.
11	Milwaukee (Western City)	Wayne F. Whittow	Milwaukee	Dem.
12	Clark, Forest, Lincoln, Oneida, Taylor, & Vilas	Clifford Krueger	Merrill	Rep.
13	Eastern Dodge, Jefferson, & Washington	Frank E. Panzer	Oakfield	Rep.
14	Outagamie & Waupaca	Gerald Lorge	Bear Creek	Rep.
15	Eastern Rock & Walworth	George M. Borg (res. Aug. 9, 1967)	Delavan	Rep.
15	Eastern Rock & Walworth	James D. Swan (from Oct. 17, 1967)	Elkhorn	Rep.
16	Most of Dane & Western Rock	Carl W. Thompson	Stoughton	Dem.
17	Grant, Green, Iowa, Lafayette, & Richland	Gordon Roseleip	Darlington	Rep.
18	Fond du Lac & Western Dodge	Walter G. Hollander	Rosendale	Rep.
19	Winnebago	William Draheim	Neenah	Rep.
20	Ozaukee & Sheboygan	Ernest Keppler	Sheboygan	Rep.
21	Racine (City & Southeast County)	Henry Dorman	Racine	Dem.
22	Kenosha	Joseph Lourigan	Kenosha	Dem.
23	Barron, Chippewa, Dunn, & Washburn	Holger Rasmusen	Spooner	Rep.
24	Green Lake, Portage, Waushara, & Wood	William C. Hansen	Stevens Point	Dem.
25	Ashland, Bayfield, Douglas, Iron, Price, Rusk, & Sawyer	Arthur Cirilli	Superior	Rep.
26	Dane (Madison)	Fred Risser	Madison	Dem.
27	Adams, Columbia, Juneau, Marquette, & Sauk	Walter Terry	Baraboo	Rep.
28	Southwest Milwaukee, Most of Racine, & Southern Waukesha	Taylor Benson	Raymond	Dem.
29	Marathon, Menominee, & Shawano	Walter Chilsen	Wausau	Rep.
30	Northern Brown, Florence, Langlade, Marinette, & Oconto	Reuben La Fave	Oconto	Rep.
31	Eau Claire, Jackson, Monroe, & Trempealeau	Raymond C. Johnson	Eau Claire	Rep.
32	Crawford, La Crosse, & Vernon	Raymond Bice Sr.	La Crosse	Rep.
33	Waukesha (Northern half)	Chester Dempsey	Hartland	Rep.

=== Members of the Assembly ===
Members of the Assembly for the Seventy-Eighth Wisconsin Legislature:

Assembly partisan composition Democratic: 48 seats Republican: 52 seats

Milwaukee County districts

Senate Dist.	County	Dist.	Representative	Party	Residence
27	Adams, Juneau, & Marquette		Tommy Thompson	Rep.	Elroy
25	Ashland, Bayfield, & Iron		Bernard E. Gehrmann	Rep.	Ashland
23	Barron & Washburn		John C. Van Hollen	Rep.	Chetek
02	Brown	1	Jerome Quinn	Rep.	Green Bay
02	Brown	2	Lawrence J. Kafka	Rep.	New Denmark
02	Brown	3	Cletus J. Vanderperren	Dem.	Green Bay
10	Buffalo, Pepin, & Pierce		Stanley York	Rep.	River Falls
10	Burnett & Polk		Harvey L. Dueholm	Dem.	Luck
02	Calumet		Gervase Hephner	Dem.	Chilton
23	Chippewa		Bruce Peloquin	Dem.	Chippewa Falls
12	Clark		William C. Kavanaugh	Rep.	Greenwood
27	Columbia		Wesley L. Packard	Rep.	Lodi
32	Crawford & Vernon		Bernard Lewison	Rep.	Viroqua
26	Dane	1	Norman C. Anderson	Dem.	Madison
26	Dane	2	Edward Nager	Dem.	Madison
26	Dane	3	Robert Uehling	Rep.	Madison
16	Dane	4	Russel R. Weisensel	Rep.	Sun Prairie
16	Dane	5	David D. O'Malley	Dem.	Waunakee
13	Dodge	1	Esther Doughty Luckhardt	Rep.	Horicon
18	Dodge	2	Elmer C. Nitschke	Rep.	Beaver Dam
01	Door & Kewaunee		Lawrence Johnson	Rep.	Algoma
25	Douglas		Reino A. Perala	Dem.	Superior
23	Dunn		Alvin Baldus	Dem.	Menomonie
31	Eau Claire	1	Wilmer R. Waters	Rep.	Eau Claire
31	Eau Claire	2	Louis V. Mato	Dem.	Fairchild
30	Florence & Marinette		Leslie R. Stevenson	Dem.	Marinette
18	Fond du Lac	1	Earl F. McEssy	Rep.	Fond du Lac
18	Fond du Lac	2	William S. Schwefel	Rep.	Oakfield
12	Forest, Oneida, & Vilas		Paul Alfonsi	Rep.	Minocqua
17	Grant		James N. Azim Jr.	Rep.	Muscoda
17	Green & Lafayette		G. Fred Galli (died Jan. 10, 1967)	Rep.	Monroe
17	Green & Lafayette		Joseph E. Tregoning (from Apr. 10, 1967)	Rep.	Shullsburg
24	Green Lake & Waushara		Franklin M. Jahnke	Rep.	Markesan
17	Iowa & Richland		Gregor J. Bock	Rep.	Highland
31	Jackson & Trempealeau		John Q. Radcliffe	Dem.	Strum
13	Jefferson		Byron F. Wackett	Rep.	Watertown
22	Kenosha	1	George Molinaro	Dem.	Kenosha
22	Kenosha	2	Russell Olson	Rep.	Randall
32	La Crosse	1	D. Russell Wartinbee	Rep.	La Crosse
32	La Crosse	2	Norbert Nuttelman	Rep.	West Salem
30	Langlade & Oconto		Milton McDougal	Dem.	Oconto Falls
30	Langlade & Oconto		Milton McDougal	Rep.	Oconto Falls
12	Lincoln & Taylor		Joseph Sweda	Dem.	Lublin
01	Manitowoc	1	Eugene S. Kaufman	Dem.	Manitowoc
01	Manitowoc	2	Everett E. Bolle	Dem.	Two Rivers
29	Marathon	1	Ben A. Riehle (died Nov. 27, 1967)	Dem.	Athens
29	Marathon	1	--Vacant from Nov. 27, 1967--		
29	Marathon	2	Dave Obey	Dem.	Wausau
29	Menominee & Shawano		Herbert J. Grover	Dem.	Shawano
06	Milwaukee	1	Mark Lipscomb Jr.	Dem.	Milwaukee
05	Milwaukee	2	Joseph E. Jones	Dem.	Milwaukee
04	Milwaukee	3	Joseph F. Bellante Jr.	Rep.	Milwaukee
09	Milwaukee	4	Frank E. Schaeffer Jr.	Dem.	Milwaukee
06	Milwaukee	5	Paul Sicula	Dem.	Milwaukee
09	Milwaukee	6	Lloyd Barbee	Dem.	Milwaukee
06	Milwaukee	7	William A. Johnson	Dem.	Milwaukee
11	Milwaukee	8	Adrian Manders (died Jun. 22, 1967)	Dem.	Milwaukee
11	Milwaukee	8	Verna Manders (from Oct. 16, 1967)	Dem.	Milwaukee
05	Milwaukee	9	Edward F. Mertz	Dem.	Milwaukee
11	Milwaukee	10	Fred Kessler	Dem.	Milwaukee
03	Milwaukee	11	Raymond J. Tobiasz	Dem.	Milwaukee
03	Milwaukee	12	Sam L. Orlich	Dem.	Milwaukee
09	Milwaukee	13	Ronald G. Parys	Dem.	Milwaukee
03	Milwaukee	14	Robert P. Kordus	Dem.	Milwaukee
05	Milwaukee	15	James McCann	Dem.	Milwaukee
11	Milwaukee	16	Richard E. Pabst	Dem.	Milwaukee
07	Milwaukee	17	John E. McCormick	Dem.	Milwaukee
04	Milwaukee	18	James E. Held (died Oct. 15, 1967)	Rep.	Milwaukee
04	Milwaukee	18	--Vacant from Oct. 15, 1967--		
07	Milwaukee	19	Daniel D. Hanna	Dem.	Milwaukee
08	Milwaukee	20	George Klicka	Rep.	Wauwatosa
08	Milwaukee	21	Richard J. Lynch	Dem.	West Allis
08	Milwaukee	22	Robert T. Huber	Dem.	West Allis
28	Milwaukee	23	James C. Devitt	Dem.	Greendale
07	Milwaukee	24	William P. Atkinson	Dem.	South Milwaukee
04	Milwaukee	25	Nile Soik	Rep.	Whitefish Bay
31	Monroe		Kyle Kenyon	Rep.	Tomah
14	Outagamie	1	Harold V. Froehlich	Rep.	Appleton
14	Outagamie	2	William J. Rogers	Dem.	Kaukauna
14	Outagamie	3	Ervin Conradt	Rep.	Shiocton
20	Ozaukee		J. Curtis McKay	Rep.	Thiensville
24	Portage		Leonard A. Groshek	Dem.	Stevens Point
25	Price, Rusk & Sawyer		Willis J. Hutnik	Rep.	Ladysmith
21	Racine	1	Earl W. Warren	Dem.	Racine
21	Racine	2	Manny S. Brown	Dem.	Racine
28	Racine	3	Merrill E. Stalbaum	Rep.	Waterford
15	Rock	1	Lewis T. Mittness	Dem.	Janesville
16	Rock	2	Carolyn Blanchard	Rep.	Edgerton
15	Rock	3	George B. Belting	Rep.	Beloit
27	Sauk		Oscar A. Laper Jr.	Rep.	Rock Springs
20	Sheboygan	1	Kenneth Kunde (res. Aug. 11, 1967)	Dem.	Sheboygan
20	Sheboygan	1	Carl Otte (from Oct. 16, 1967)	Dem.	Sheboygan
20	Sheboygan	2	Harry L. Gessert	Rep.	Elkhart Lake
10	St. Croix		Robert M. Boche	Rep.	Star Prairie
22	Walworth		Clarence J. Wilger	Rep.	Elkhorn
13	Washington		Frederick C. Schroeder	Rep.	West Bend
33	Waukesha	1	Kenneth Merkel	Rep.	Brookfield
33	Waukesha	2	Harold W. Clemens	Rep.	Oconomowoc
33	Waukesha	3	Vincent R. Mathews	Dem.	Waukesha
28	Waukesha	4	John C. Shabaz	Rep.	New Berlin
14	Waupaca		Gerald K. Anderson	Rep.	Waupaca
19	Winnebago	1	Jack D. Steinhilber	Rep.	Oshkosh
19	Winnebago	2	Floyd E. Shurbert	Rep.	Oshkosh
19	Winnebago	3	David O. Martin	Rep.	Menasha
24	Wood	1	Raymond F. Heinzen	Rep.	Marshfield
24	Wood	2	Harvey F. Gee	Rep.	Wisconsin Rapids

== Committees ==
=== Senate committees ===
- Senate Standing Committee on Agriculture – F. E. Panzer, chair
- Senate Standing Committee on Conservation – C. Krueger, chair
- Senate Standing Committee on Education – H. Rasmusen, chair
- Senate Standing Committee on Governmental and Veterans Affairs – W. Draheim, chair
- Senate Standing Committee on Highways – R. La Fave, chair
- Senate Standing Committee on Interstate Cooperation – F. E. Panzer, chair
- Senate Standing Committee on the Judiciary – A. Busby, chair
- Senate Standing Committee on Labor, Taxation, Insurance, and Banking – G. Lorge, chair
- Senate Standing Committee on Public Welfare – A. Meunier, chair
- Senate Special Committee on Committees – R. Bice, chair
- Senate Special Committee on Legislative Procedure – R. P. Knowles, chair
- Senate Special Committee on Senate Organization – J. Leonard, chair

=== Assembly committees ===
- Assembly Standing Committee on Agriculture – N. Nuttelman, chair
- Assembly Standing Committee on Commerce and Manufactures – L. H. Johnson, chair
- Assembly Standing Committee on Conservation – P. Alfonsi, chair
- Assembly Standing Committee on Education – D. R. Wartinbee, chair
- Assembly Standing Committee on Elections – E. F. McEssy, chair
- Assembly Standing Committee on Excise and Fees – F. E. Shurbert, chair
- Assembly Standing Committee on Highways – W. J. Hutnik, chair
- Assembly Standing Committee on Insurance and Banking – K. Kenyon, chair
- Assembly Standing Committee on the Judiciary – G. K. Anderon, chair
- Assembly Standing Committee on Labor – N. Soik, chair
- Assembly Standing Committee on Municipalities – J. C. McKay, chair
- Assembly Standing Committee on Printing – F. C. Schroeder, chair
- Assembly Standing Committee on Public Welfare – H. F. Gee, chair
- Assembly Standing Committee on State Affairs – B. Lewison, chair
- Assembly Standing Committee on Taxation – F. M. Jahnke, chair
- Assembly Standing Committee on Transportation – E. C. Nitschke, chair
- Assembly Standing Committee on Veterans and Military Affairs – H. W. Clemens, chair
- Assembly Special Committee on Assembly Organization – H. V. Froehlich, chair
- Assembly Special Committee on Contingent Expenditures – G. J. Bock, chair
- Assembly Special Committee on Engrossed Bills – E. Doughty, chair
- Assembly Special Committee on Enrolled Bills – R. Uehling, chair
- Assembly Special Committee on Revision – H. L. Gessert, chair
- Assembly Special Committee on Rules – W. J. Hutnik, chair
- Assembly Special Committee on Third Reading – C. Blanchard, chair

=== Joint committees ===
- Joint Standing Committee on Finance – W. G. Hollander (Sen.) & B. F. Wackett (Asm.), co-chairs
- Joint Standing Committee on Legislative Organization – R. P. Knowles (Sen.) & H. V. Froehlich (Asm.), co-chairs
- Joint Standing Committee on Revisions, Repeals, and Uniform Laws – E. Keppler (Sen.) & G. B. Belting (Asm.), co-chairs
- Joint Legislative Council – J. Leonard, chair

== Employees ==
=== Senate employees ===
- Chief Clerk: William P. Nugent
- Sergeant-at-Arms: Harry O. Levander (died Nov. 16, 1967)
  - Kenneth Nicholson (from Nov. 16, 1967)

=== Assembly employees ===
- Chief Clerk: Arnold W. F. Langner (res. May 2, 1967)
  - Wilmer H. Struebing (from May 16, 1967)
- Sergeant-at-Arms: Louis C. Romell
