= Drew S. Days III =

American academic (1941–2020)

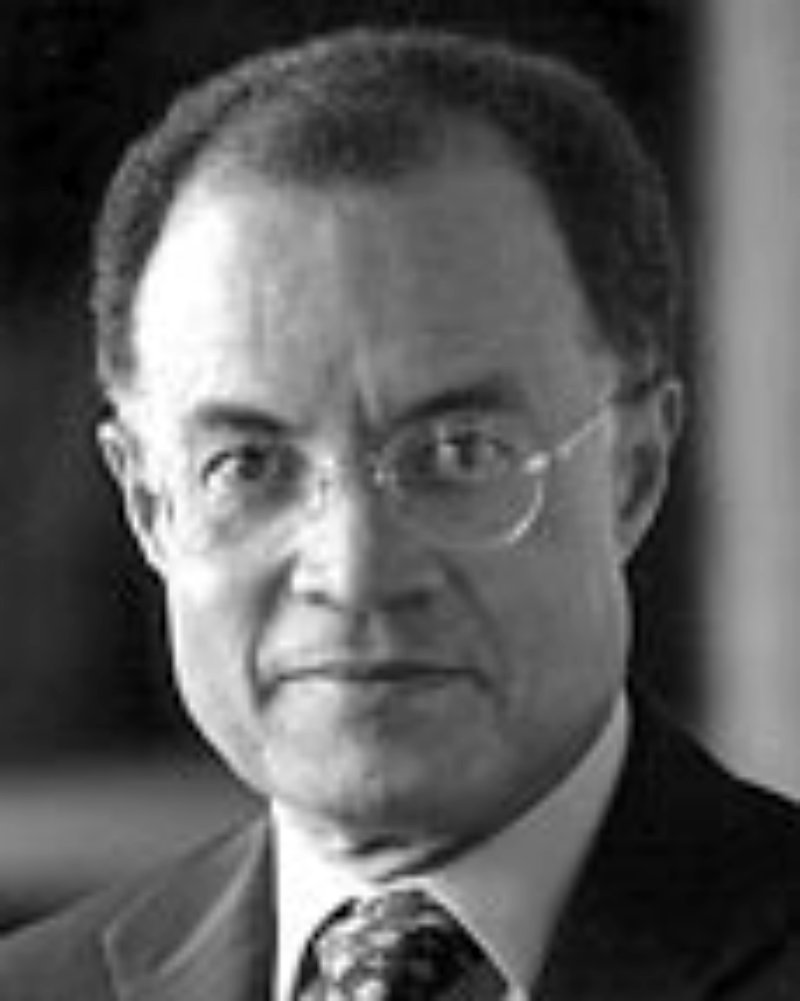

40th Solicitor General of the United States
- In office June 7, 1993 – June 28, 1996
- President: Bill Clinton
- Preceded by: Ken Starr
- Succeeded by: Seth P. Waxman

United States Assistant Attorney General for the Civil Rights Division
- In office 1977–1980
- President: Jimmy Carter
- Preceded by: John Stanley Pottinger
- Succeeded by: William Bradford Reynolds

Personal details
- Born: Drew Saunders Days III; August 29, 1941 Atlanta, Georgia, U.S.
- Died: November 15, 2020 (aged 79) New Haven, Connecticut, U.S.
- Party: Democratic
- Spouse: Ann Langdon (m. 1966)
- Children: 2
- Education: Hamilton College (BA); Yale University (JD)

Drew Saunders Days III (August 29, 1941 – November 15, 2020) was an American legal scholar who served as Solicitor General of the United States from 1993 to 1996 under President Bill Clinton. He also served as the first African American Assistant Attorney General for the Civil Rights Division in the Carter Administration from 1977 to 1980. He was the Alfred M. Rankin Professor of Law at Yale Law School, assuming that post in 1992, and joining the Yale Law faculty in 1981. From 1997 to 2011, he headed the Supreme Court and appellate practice at Morrison & Foerster LLP and was of counsel at the firm's Washington, D.C. office until his retirement from the firm in December, 2011. He earned his Juris Doctor degree at Yale Law School in 1966. He was admitted to practice law before the United States Supreme Court, and in the states of Illinois and New York.

== Education and early career ==
Days was born in Atlanta, Georgia, the son of Dorothea Jamerson, a schoolteacher, and Drew Saunders Days Jr., an insurance executive and accountant. He was a descendant of Reconstruction-era Georgia state senator Edwin Belcher.

He graduated from New Rochelle High School in New Rochelle, New York, before going on to attend Hamilton College, where he graduated cum laude in 1963 with an A.B. in English literature. Inspired by the civil rights leaders of that time, Days enrolled at Yale Law School where he graduated with a Juris Doctor degree in 1966. Days, a tenor, was a member of the Yale Russian Chorus during his years in New Haven, and remained active with the ensemble throughout his career. Upon graduation from law school, he briefly practiced law in Chicago, Illinois, before serving as a Peace Corps volunteer in Honduras for two years.

Returning to the United States in 1969, he became first assistant counsel at the NAACP Legal Defense and Educational Fund in New York City. Days worked at LDF for eight years litigating a range of civil rights cases.

== Appointments and professorship ==
In 1977, President Jimmy Carter nominated Days to serve as the Assistant Attorney General for Civil Rights in the United States Department of Justice. His tenure was marked by an aggressive enforcement of the nation's civil rights laws.

Days served in the Department of Justice until 1981 when he joined the faculty of the Yale Law School. In 1988 he founded the Orville H. Schell Jr. Center for Human Rights at Yale Law School and served as its director until 1993.

In 1993, Days was nominated by President Bill Clinton to serve as Solicitor General in the Department of Justice. In that position, he was responsible for representing the positions and interests of the United States in arguments before the Supreme Court. Shortly after his appointment, he argued the government's case before the Supreme Court that the lower court's decision in Knox v. United States was wrong, even though it had found in favor of the government. He urged the Supreme Court to vacate Stephen Knox's conviction for possession of child pornography; they remanded the case to Circuit Court. Law scholars like Ernest A. Young have scrutinized Days' oral argument in favor of the government in the landmark 1995 Supreme Court case United States v. Lopez, arguing that Days' repeated failure to give any Justice (particularly the then-median Justice Sandra Day O'Connor) an example of a situation in which the government could not regulate a given activity as beyond the Commerce Clause's power was a substantial contributor to the Court's eventual decision in Lopez to overturn a federal law as beyond the Commerce Clause's power for the first time since 1937.

== Private practice and alumni work ==
After leaving the Clinton administration, Days returned to Yale Law School and private practice. He was involved in national and international efforts to resolve social and economic issues—including Hurricane Katrina, poverty alleviation, the environment, and juvenile justice.

Days also served as a trustee at Hamilton College. In 2011, Hamilton opened the Days–Massolo Center with the goal of promoting diversity awareness and fostering dialogue among the wide variety of cultures represented on campus. The center is dedicated to Days and fellow Hamilton trustee Arthur J. Massolo.

== Selected bibliography ==
- Days III, Drew S. (2001), "Days, J., concurring", in Balkan, Jack; Ackerman, Bruce A. (eds.), What 'Brown v. Board of Education' should have said, New York: New York University Press, pp. 92–99, ISBN 9780814798904. Preview.

Legal offices
Preceded by William Bryson (Acting)	Solicitor General of the United States; 1993–1996	Succeeded by Walter Dellinger (Acting)
