= 1962 United States Senate election in Wisconsin =

- November 6, 1962
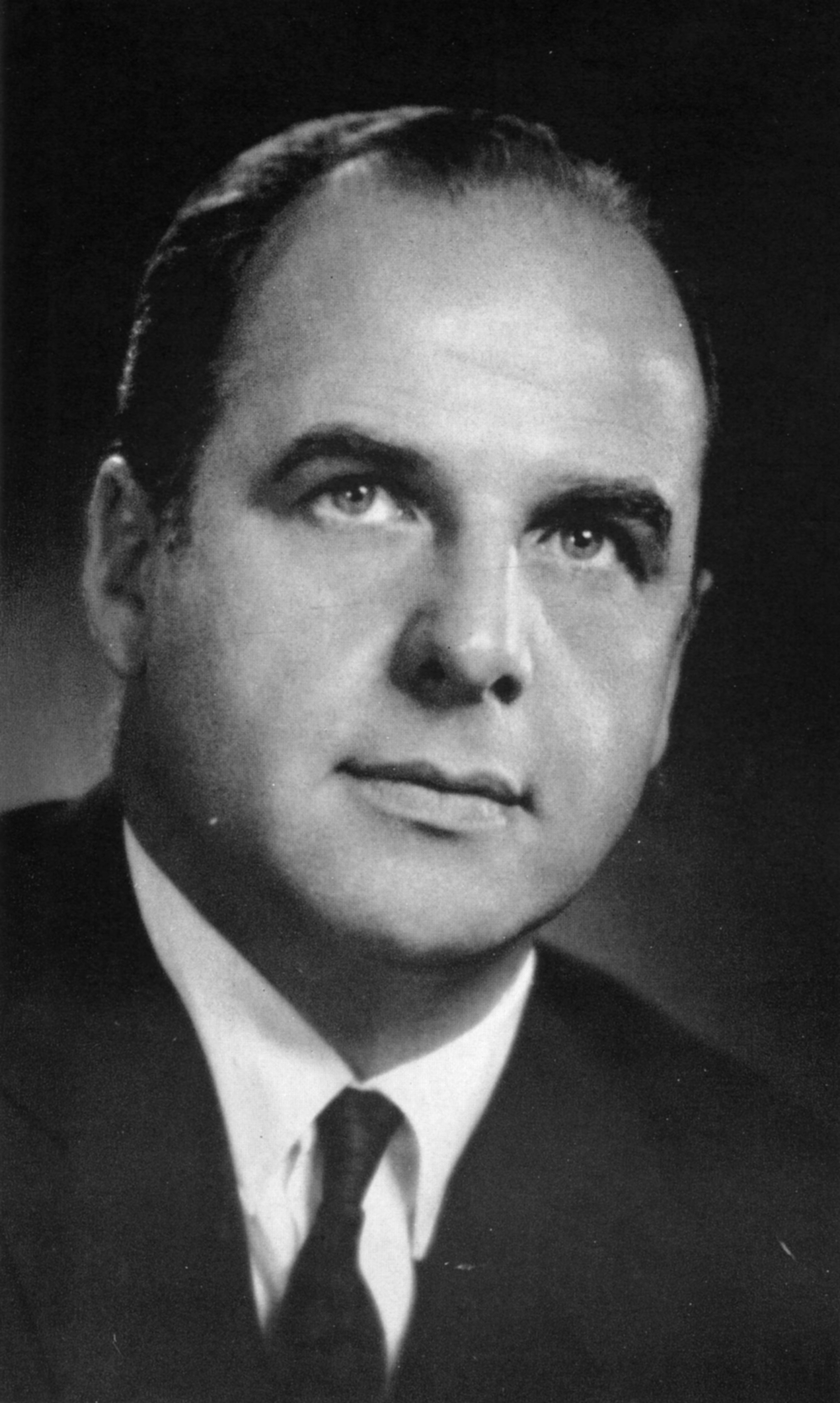

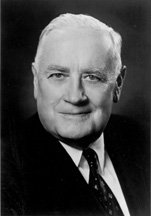
Nominee	Gaylord Nelson	Alexander Wiley
Party	Democratic	Republican
Popular vote	662,342	594,846
Percentage	52.26%	47.21%
- County results Nelson: 50–60% 60–70% Wiley: 40–50% 50–60% 60–70% 70–80%
U.S. senator before election
Alexander Wiley
Republican
Elected U.S. Senator
Gaylord A. Nelson
Democratic

The 1962 United States Senate election in Wisconsin was held on November 6, 1962. Incumbent Republican U.S. senator Alexander Wiley ran for re-election to a fifth term in office but was defeated by Democratic governor Gaylord A. Nelson. This was the first time since 1897 that Democrats held both Senate seats in the state.

== General ==
=== Candidates ===
- Gaylord A. Nelson, Governor of Wisconsin (Democratic)
- Alexander Wiley, incumbent U.S. senator since 1939 (Republican)
- William O. Hart (Independent)
- Georgia Cozzini, perennial candidate (Socialist Labor)
- Wayne Leverenz (Socialist Workers)

=== Results ===
General election results
Democratic	Gaylord A. Nelson	662,342	52.26
Republican	Alexander Wiley (incumbent)	594,846	47.21
Independent	William O. Hart	1,428	0.11
Socialist Labor	Georgia Cozzini	1,096	0.09
Socialist Workers	Wayne Leverenz	368	0.03
Party	Candidate	Votes	%
Total votes			
Turnout		???	
Democratic gain from Republican			

== See also ==
- United States Senate elections, 1962
