= United States Department of Justice Civil Rights Division =

Federal institution

- Seal of the United States Department of Justice

Division overview
- Formed: December 9, 1957
- Jurisdiction: United States federal government agency
- Headquarters: Robert F. Kennedy Department of Justice Building 950 Pennsylvania Avenue NW Washington, D.C., United States
- Annual budget: $107.8 million (2026)
- Division executive: Craig Trainor, Acting Assistant Attorney General
- Parent department: United States Department of Justice
- Key document: Civil Rights Act of 1957
- Website: justice.gov/crt

The United States Department of Justice Civil Rights Division is a division of the US Department of Justice that enforces federal statutes prohibiting discrimination on the basis of race, sex, disability, religion, and national origin.

The division was established on December 9, 1957, by order of Attorney General William P. Rogers, after the Civil Rights Act of 1957 created the head office of Assistant Attorney General for Civil Rights (AAG-CR; appointed by the president and confirmed by the Senate)

== Organization ==
- Assistant Attorney General for Civil Rights:
  - Appellate Section
  - Coordination and Review Section
  - Criminal Section
  - Disability Rights Section
  - Educational Opportunities Section
  - Employment Litigation Section
  - Housing and Civil Enforcement Section
  - Immigrant and Employee Rights Section
  - Policy & Strategy Section
  - Second Amendment Section
  - Special Litigation Section
  - Voting Section

== Jurisdiction ==
The division enforces

- the Civil Rights Acts of 1957, 1960, 1964, and 1968
- the Voting Rights Act of 1965, as amended through 2006
- the Equal Credit Opportunity Act of 1974
- the Americans with Disabilities Act of 1990
- the National Voter Registration Act of 1993
- the Matthew Shepard and James Byrd Jr. Hate Crimes Prevention Act of 2009
- the Uniformed and Overseas Citizens Absentee Voting Act of 1986
- the Voting Accessibility for the Elderly and Handicapped Act of 1984
- the Civil Rights of Institutionalized Persons Act of 1980, which authorizes the Attorney General to seek relief for persons confined in public institutions where conditions exist that deprive residents of their constitutional rights
- the Freedom of Access to Clinic Entrances Act of 1994
- the Police Misconduct Provision of the Violent Crime Control and Law Enforcement Act of 1994
- the Religious Land Use and Institutionalized Persons Act of 2000
- the Religious Freedom Restoration Act of 1993
- Section 102 of the Immigration Reform and Control Act of 1986 (IRCA), as amended, which prohibits discrimination on the basis of national origin and citizenship status as well as document abuse and retaliation under the Immigration and Nationality Act of 1952.

In addition, the division prosecutes actions under several criminal civil rights statutes which were designed to preserve personal liberties and safety.

== Office of the Assistant Attorney General for Civil Rights ==
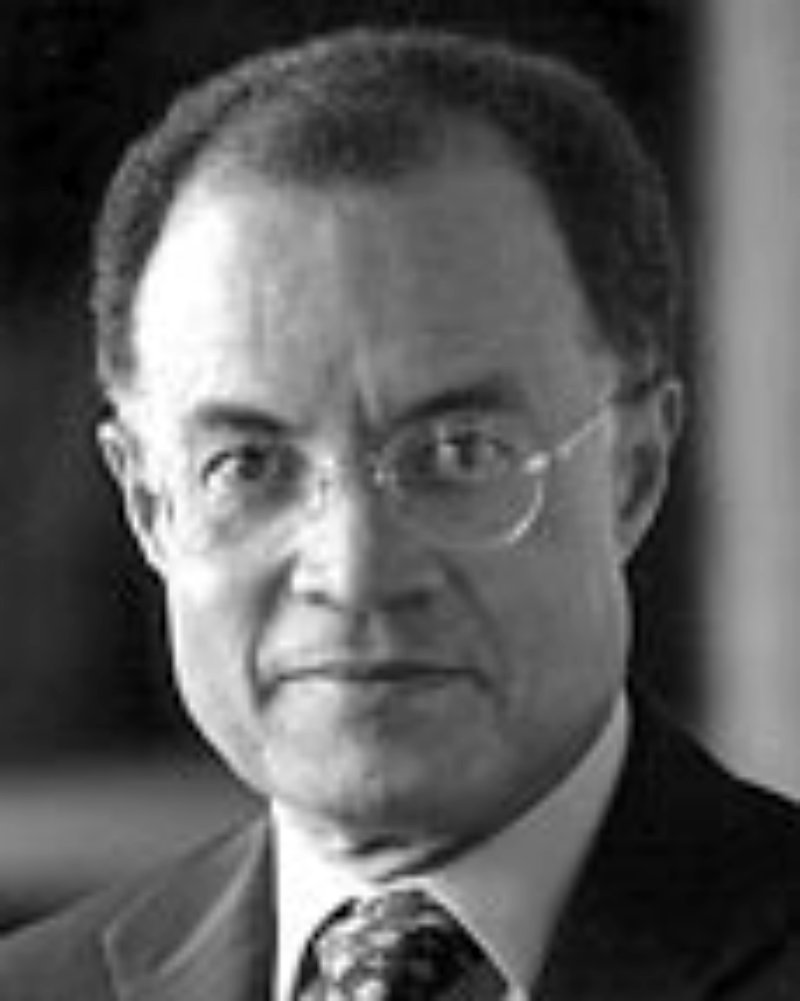
Drew S. Days III was the first African-American Assistant Attorney General for the Civil Rights Division.

denotes head that served as acting Assistant Attorney General

#	Head	Took office	Left office	Party	Administration	Ref.
1	W. Wilson White	1957	1960	Republican	Dwight D. Eisenhower	
2	Harold R. Tyler	1960	1961	Republican	Dwight D. Eisenhower	
3	Burke Marshall	1961	1965	Democratic	John F. Kennedy	
4	John Doar	1965	1967	Republican	Lyndon B. Johnson	
5	Stephen J. Pollak	1967	1969	Democratic	Lyndon B. Johnson	
6	Jerris Leonard	1969	1971	Republican	Richard Nixon	
7	David Luke Norman	1971	1973	Republican	Richard Nixon	
8	J. Stanley Pottinger	1973	1977	Republican	Richard Nixon	
9	Drew S. Days	1977	1980	Democratic	Jimmy Carter	
10	William Bradford Reynolds	1981	1988	Republican	Ronald Reagan	
–	William C. Lucas (acting)	1988	1989	Republican	Ronald Reagan	
–	James P. Turner (acting)	1989	1990	Republican	Ronald Reagan	
11	John R. Dunne	1990	1993	Republican	George H. W. Bush	
–	James P. Turner (acting)	1993	1994	Democratic	Bill Clinton	
12	Deval Patrick	1994	1997	Democratic	Bill Clinton	
13	Bill Lann Lee	1997	2001	Democratic	Bill Clinton	
14	Ralph F. Boyd Jr.	2001	2003	Republican	George W. Bush	
–	Bradley Schlozman (acting)	2003	2003	Republican	George W. Bush	
15	Alexander Acosta	2003	2005	Republican	George W. Bush	
16	Wan J. Kim	2005	2007	Republican	George W. Bush	
–	Grace Chung Becker (acting)	2008	2008	Republican	George W. Bush	
17	Thomas Perez	2009	2013	Democratic	Barack Obama	
–	Jocelyn Samuels (acting)	2013	2014	Democratic	Barack Obama	
–	Molly J. Moran (acting)	2014	2014	Democratic	Barack Obama	
–	Vanita Gupta (acting)	2014	2017	Democratic	Barack Obama	
–	Thomas E. Wheeler II (acting)	2017	2017	Republican	Donald Trump	
–	John M. Gore (acting)	2017	2018	Republican	Donald Trump	
18	Eric Dreiband	2018	2021	Republican	Donald Trump	
19	Kristen Clarke	2021	2025	Democratic	Joe Biden	
–	Mac Warner (acting)	2025	2025	Republican	Donald Trump	
20	Harmeet Dhillon	2025	2026	Republican	Donald Trump	
–	Jesus A. Osete (acting)	2026	2026	Republican	Donald Trump	
