= Jerris Leonard =

20th century American politician

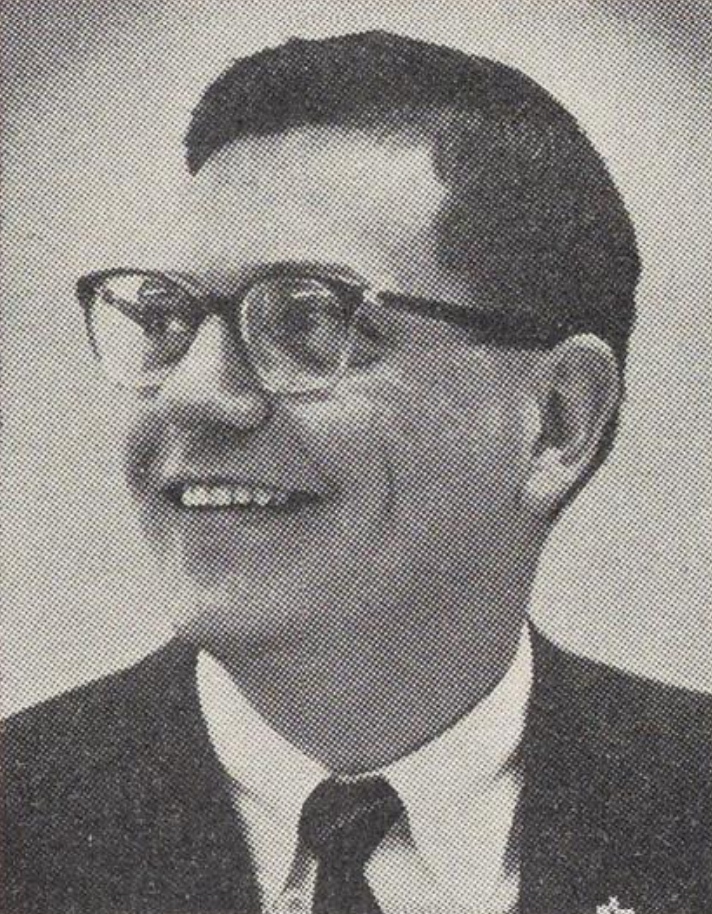

6th United States Assistant Attorney General for the Civil Rights Division
- In office 1969–1971
- President: Richard Nixon
- Preceded by: Stephen J. Pollak
- Succeeded by: David Luke Norman

Member of the Wisconsin Senate from the 4th district
- In office January 2, 1961 – January 6, 1969
- Preceded by: Kirby Hendee
- Succeeded by: Nile Soik

Member of the Wisconsin State Assembly from the Milwaukee 19th district
- In office January 7, 1957 – January 2, 1961
- Preceded by: William Kasik
- Succeeded by: Nile Soik

Personal details
- Born: January 17, 1931 Chicago, Illinois, U.S.
- Died: July 27, 2006 (aged 75) Bethesda, Maryland, U.S.
- Party: Republican
- Spouse: Mariellen C. Mathie (m. 1953–2006)
- Children: 6
- Education: Marquette University
- Profession: Lawyer, Politician

Jerris Gilbert Leonard Jr. (January 17, 1931 – July 27, 2006) was an American lawyer and Republican politician. He served as Assistant Attorney General for the Civil Rights Division in the United States Department of Justice during the first two years of the Richard Nixon administration. Prior to his federal service, he served eight years in the Wisconsin Senate (1961–1969) and four years in the State Assembly (1957–1961), representing northern Milwaukee County.

== Background and personal life ==
Leonard was born on January 17, 1931, to Jerris and Marie Leonard in Chicago, Illinois. His family moved to Milwaukee, Wisconsin, where he graduated from Rufus King High School. He earned a B.S. in business administration in 1952 from Marquette University, and in 1955 earned an LL.B. from Marquette University Law School.

On August 22, 1953, he married Mariellen C. Mathie, with whom he had six children. He died on July 27, 2006, in Bethesda, Maryland.

== Legislative service ==
Leonard was first elected to the Wisconsin State Assembly in 1956 to succeed William Kasik from the 19th Milwaukee County district, which included the Town of Milwaukee (but not the City of Milwaukee itself), Bayside, Fox Point, Glendale, Granville, River Hills, Shorewood, and Whitefish Bay. He served two terms, and advanced to the Wisconsin State Senate in 1960, serving two terms (1961–1969). He ran against United States Senator Gaylord Nelson in the 1968 United States Senate election and was defeated.

== Federal service ==
He was in the United States Department of Justice 1969–1973 during the administration of President Richard Nixon, serving as the first administrator of the Law Enforcement Assistance Administration.

== United Sciences of America, Inc. ==
In the 1980s Leonard served as president of United Sciences of America, Inc., a multi-level marketing company selling nutritional supplements, which was accused of deceptive practices and false claims, and eventually filed bankruptcy.

== Sources ==
- Papers of Jerris Leonard in the Wisconsin State Historical Society
- Wisconsin Senate Joint Resolution in memory of Jerris Leonard

Party political offices
Preceded by Alexander Wiley	Republican nominee for U.S. Senator from Wisconsin (Class 3); 1968	Succeeded by Tom Petri
Wisconsin State Assembly
Preceded by William Kasik	Member of the Wisconsin State Assembly from the Milwaukee 19th district January 7, 1957 – January 2, 1961	Succeeded by Nile Soik
Wisconsin Senate
Preceded by Kirby Hendee	Member of the Wisconsin Senate from the 4th district January 2, 1961 – January 6, 1969	Succeeded by Nile Soik
