= 1958 Wisconsin gubernatorial election =

- November 4, 1958
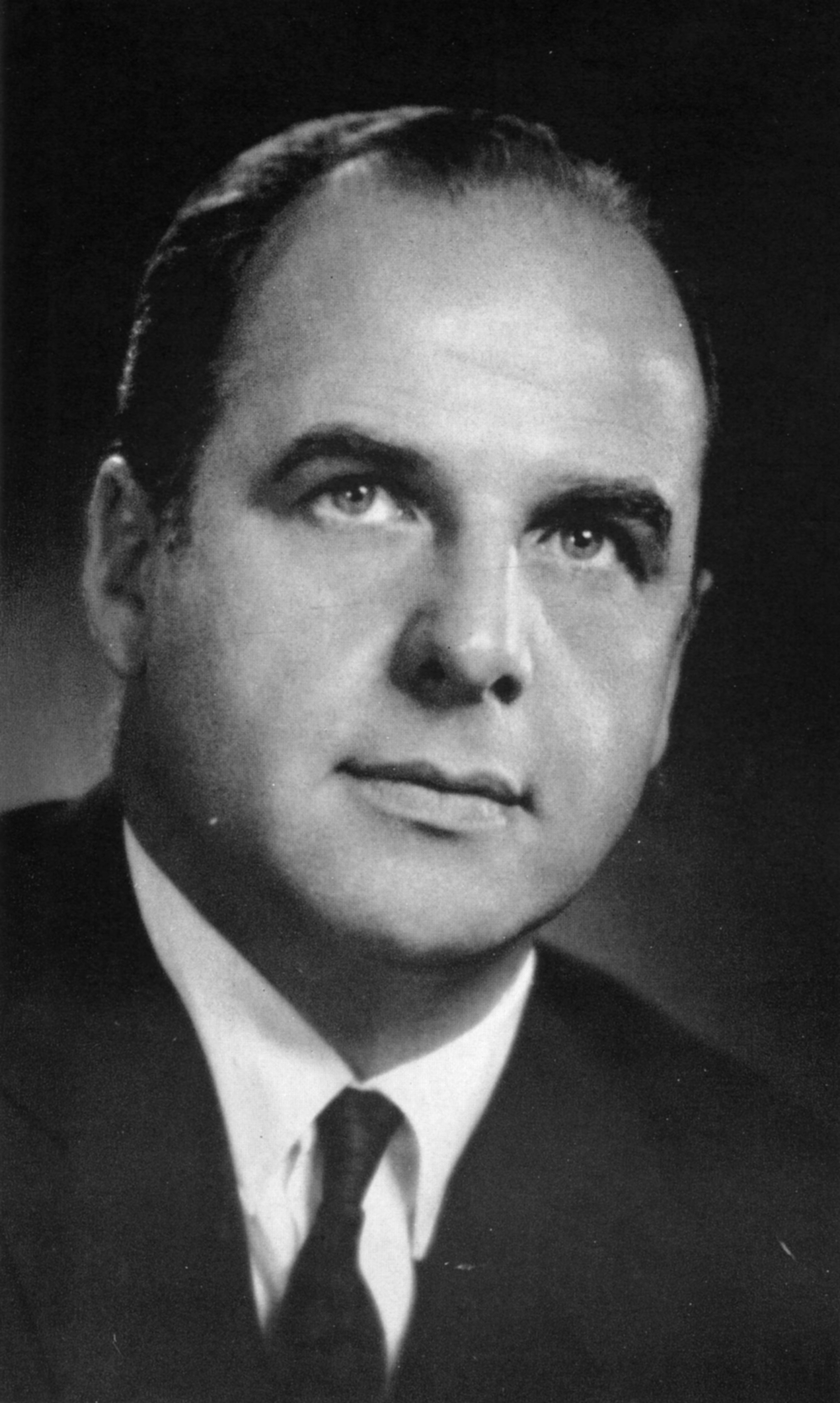

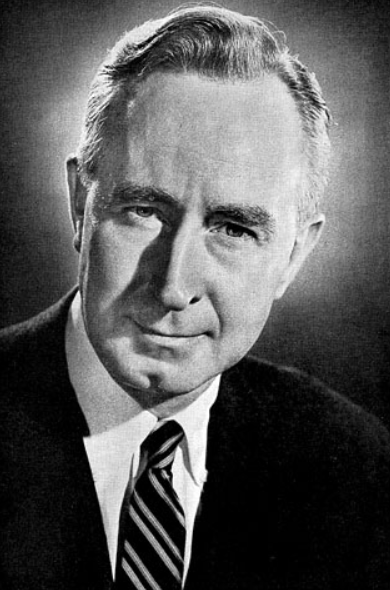
Nominee	Gaylord A. Nelson	Vernon W. Thomson
Party	Democratic	Republican
Popular vote	644,296	556,391
Percentage	53.59%	46.28%
- County results Nelson: 50–60% 60–70% 70–80% Thomson: 50–60% 60–70%
Governor before election
Vernon W. Thomson
Republican
Elected Governor
Gaylord A. Nelson
Democratic

The 1958 Wisconsin gubernatorial election was held on November 4, 1958. The Democratic nominee, state senator Gaylord A. Nelson, defeated the Republican incumbent governor, Vernon W. Thomson, receiving 53.59% of the vote.

This was the first Democratic victory in a Wisconsin gubernatorial election since 1932, and only the second since 1892. Nelson's share of the vote was the highest for a Democrat since 1873. As of 2024, this is the most recent gubernatorial election in which Vilas County has voted for the Democratic candidate.

== Primary election ==
The primary election was held on September 9, 1958. Both major party candidates were unopposed in their respective primaries.

=== Republican party ===
==== Candidates ====
- Vernon W. Thomson, incumbent governor

==== Results ====
Republican primary results
Party	Candidate	Votes	%
Republican	Vernon W. Thomson (incumbent)	241,816	100.00%
Total votes		241,816	100.00%

=== Democratic party ===
==== Candidates ====
- Gaylord A. Nelson, member of the Wisconsin State Senate since 1948.

==== Results ====
Democratic primary results
Party	Candidate	Votes	%
Democratic	Gaylord A. Nelson	234,345	100.00%
Total votes		234,345	100.00%

== General election ==
=== Candidates ===
- Gaylord A. Nelson, Democrat
- Vernon W. Thomson, Republican
- Wayne Leverenz, Independent

=== Results ===
1958 Wisconsin gubernatorial election
Party	Candidate	Votes	%	±%
Democratic	Gaylord A. Nelson	644,296	53.59%	+5.48%
Republican	Vernon W. Thomson (incumbent)	556,391	46.28%	−5.61%
Independent	Wayne Leverenz (Note: Not listed by county in the Blue Book but full results are listed in the Board of Canvassers report.)	1,485	0.12%	
	Scattering (Note: These are not listed in the Blue Book but are listed in the Board of Canvassers report.)	47	0.00%	
Majority		87,905	7.31%	
Total votes		1,202,219	100.00%	
Democratic gain from Republican		Swing	+11.09%	

=== Results by county ===
By backing Thomson, Oconto County voted for the losing candidate for the first time since 1875, breaking a streak of 40 consecutive elections of backing the eventual winner. Additionally, Clark County, Green County, and Waupaca County voted for the losing candidate for the first time since 1892.

County	Gaylord A. Nelson Democratic		Vernon W. Thomson Republican		Wayne Leverenz Independent		Margin		Total votes cast
County	#	%	#	%	#	%	#	%	Total votes cast
Adams	1,540	56.37%	1,190	43.56%	0	0.00%	350	12.81%	2,732 (Note: Includes 2 Scattering votes)
Ashland	3,773	59.14%	2,603	40.80%	4	0.06%	1,107	18.34%	6,380
Barron	4,928	51.05%	4,716	48.86%	9	0.09%	212	2.20%	9,653
Bayfield	2,739	59.18%	1,886	40.75%	3	0.06%	853	18.43%	4,628
Brown	16,747	44.30%	21,036	55.65%	19	0.05%	-4,289	-11.35%	37,802
Buffalo	1,779	49.33%	1,824	50.58%	3	0.08%	-45	-1.25%	3,606
Burnett	1,931	53.06%	1,703	46.80%	5	0.14%	228	6.27%	3,639
Calumet	2,596	40.22%	3,851	59.67%	0	0.00%	-1,255	-19.45%	6,454 (Note: Includes 7 Scattering votes)
Chippewa	7,055	58.29%	5,037	41.62%	11	0.09%	2,018	16.67%	12,103
Clark	4,809	49.33%	4,932	50.59%	7	0.07%	-123	-1.26%	9,748
Columbia	5,576	48.50%	5,918	51.47%	3	0.03%	-342	-2.97%	11,497
Crawford	2,548	47.18%	2,851	52.79%	2	0.04%	-303	-5.61%	5,401
Dane	39,790	62.12%	2,4251	37.86%	6	0.01%	15,539	24.26%	64,050 (Note: Includes 3 Scattering votes)
Dodge	8,013	45.76%	9,489	54.19%	8	0.05%	-1,476	-8.43%	17,510
Door	2,639	37.92%	4,316	62.01%	5	0.07%	-1,677	-24.09%	6,960
Douglas	11,016	64.38%	6,080	35.53%	15	0.09%	4,936	28.85%	17,111
Dunn	3,550	45.45%	4,258	54.51%	3	0.04%	-708	-9.06%	7,811
Eau Claire	10,347	56.65%	7,896	43.23%	22	0.12%	2,451	13.42%	18,265
Florence	856	55.51%	683	44.29%	3	0.19%	173	11.22%	1,542
Fond du Lac	10,590	44.42%	13,222	55.46%	27	0.11%	-2,632	-11.04%	23,841
Forest	1,965	65.02%	1,050	34.75%	7	0.23%	915	30.28%	3,022
Grant	4,517	34.26%	8,637	65.50%	32	0.24%	-4,120	-31.25%	13,186
Green	2,838	38.63%	4,506	61.34%	2	0.03%	-1,668	-22.71%	7,346
Green Lake	2,016	31.89%	4,291	67.87%	15	0.24%	-2,275	-35.99%	6,322
Iowa	2,663	45.20%	3,229	54.80%	0	0.00%	-566	-9.61%	5,892
Iron	2,463	70.59%	1,020	29.23%	6	0.17%	1,443	41.36%	3,489
Jackson	2,643	55.64%	2,104	44.29%	2	0.04%	539	11.35%	4,750 (Note: Includes 1 Scattering vote)
Jefferson	8,463	50.50%	8,285	49.43%	12	0.07%	178	1.06%	16,760
Juneau	3,002	46.53%	3,446	53.41%	4	0.06%	-444	-6.88%	6,452
Kenosha	17,699	59.79%	11,871	40.10%	31	0.10%	5,828	19.69%	29,601
Kewaunee	2,833	47.48%	3,132	52.49%	2	0.03%	-299	-5.01%	5,967
La Crosse	11,789	51.45%	11,035	48.16%	89	0.39%	754	3.29%	22,913
Lafayette	2,500	46.05%	2,929	53.95%	0	0.00%	-429	-7.90%	5,429
Langlade	3,727	53.67%	3,210	46.23%	7	0.10%	517	7.45%	6,944
Lincoln	3,840	50.74%	3,719	49.14%	9	0.12%	121	1.60%	7,568
Manitowoc	12,281	53.92%	10,417	45.73%	79	0.35%	1,864	8.18%	22,777
Marathon	16,064	56.65%	12,267	43.26%	23	0.08%	3,797	13.39%	28,356
Marinette	5,369	48.84%	5,618	51.11%	5	0.05%	-249	-2.27%	10,992
Marquette	941	36.73%	1,620	63.23%	1	0.04%	-679	-26.50%	2,562
Milwaukee	190,647	61.58%	118,310	38.22%	612	0.20%	72,337	23.37%	309,576
Monroe	4,422	49.85%	4,445	50.11%	0	0.00%	-23	-0.26%	8,871 (Note: Includes 4 Scattering votes)
Oconto	4,029	48.81%	4,222	51.14%	4	0.05%	-193	-2.34%	8,255
Oneida	5,090	57.34%	3,782	42.60%	5	0.06%	1,308	14.73%	8,877
Outagamie	10,611	39.19%	16,388	60.52%	78	0.29%	-5,777	-21.34%	27,077
Ozaukee	5,448	47.76%	5,956	52.21%	4	0.04%	-508	-4.45%	11,408
Pepin	838	48.33%	895	51.61%	1	0.06%	-57	-3.29%	1,734
Pierce	2,656	46.31%	3,079	53.69%	0	0.00%	-423	-7.38%	5,735
Polk	4,598	56.96%	3,470	42.98%	5	0.06%	1,128	13.97%	8,073
Portage	7,698	62.97%	4,510	36.89%	17	0.14%	3,188	26.08%	12,225
Price	3,043	56.10%	2,373	43.75%	8	0.15%	670	12.35%	5,424
Racine	26,423	60.49%	17,229	39.44%	32	0.07%	9,194	21.05%	43,684
Richland	2,756	43.64%	3,557	56.33%	2	0.03%	-801	-12.68%	6,315
Rock	14,166	47.03%	15,913	52.83%	39	0.13%	-1,747	-5.80%	30,119
Rusk	2,813	57.02%	2,114	42.85%	6	0.12%	699	14.17%	4,933
Sauk	5,539	46.50%	6,366	53.44%	6	0.05%	-827	-6.94%	11,912
Sawyer	1,591	45.48%	1,900	54.32%	0	0.00%	-309	-8.83%	3,498
Shawano	3,884	43.17%	5,109	56.78%	5	0.06%	-1,225	-13.61%	8,998
Sheboygan	15,777	51.56%	14,815	48.42%	0	0.00%	962	3.14%	30,599
St. Croix	4,431	50.01%	4,426	49.95%	3	0.03%	5	0.06%	8,860
Taylor	3,362	59.30%	2,303	40.62%	4	0.07%	1,059	18.68%	5,669
Trempealeau	3,670	53.68%	3,166	46.31%	1	0.01%	504	7.37%	6,837
Vernon	4,885	56.10%	3,819	43.86%	4	0.05%	1,066	12.24%	8,708
Vilas	2,398	51.70%	2,232	48.12%	8	0.17%	166	3.58%	4,638
Walworth	5,753	38.67%	9,116	61.27%	9	0.06%	-3,363	-22.60%	14,878
Washburn	1,784	49.04%	1,852	50.91%	2	0.05%	-68	-1.87%	3,638
Washington	5,768	46.14%	6,728	53.82%	5	0.04%	-960	-7.68%	12,502
Waukesha	20,637	48.45%	21,902	51.42%	57	0.13%	-1,265	-2.97%	42,596
Waupaca	3,972	37.09%	6,732	62.87%	4	0.04%	-2,760	-25.78%	10,708
Waushara	1,446	36.00%	2,569	63.95%	0	0.00%	-1,123	-27.96%	4,017
Winnebago	15,494	46.21%	17,979	53.62%	59	0.18%	-2,485	-7.41%	33,532
Wood	8,232	47.69%	9,006	52.17%	24	0.14%	-774	-4.48%	17,262
Total	644,296	53.59%	556,391	46.28%	1,485	0.12%	87,905	7.31%	1,202,219

==== Counties that flipped from Republican to Democratic ====
- Adams
- Barron
- Burnett
- Eau Claire
- Florence
- Jefferson
- La Crosse
- Langlade
- Lincoln
- Oneida
- Price
- Sheboygan
- St. Croix
- Taylor
- Vilas
