= William Bradford Reynolds =

American attorney (1942–2019)

10th United States Assistant Attorney General for the Civil Rights Division
- In office 1981 – December 9, 1988
- President: Ronald Reagan
- Preceded by: Drew S. Days III
- Succeeded by: John R. Dunne

Personal details
- Born: July 21, 1942 Bridgeport, Connecticut, U.S.
- Died: September 14, 2019 (aged 77) Seabrook Island, South Carolina, U.S.
- Party: Republican
- Education: Yale University (BA); Vanderbilt University (LLB)

William Bradford Reynolds (July 21, 1942 – September 14, 2019) was an American attorney who served as the United States Assistant Attorney General for the Civil Rights Division from 1981 to 1988.

Reynolds was senior counsel in the Baker Botts Antitrust and Competition division.

== Early life and education ==
Reynolds was born in Bridgeport, Connecticut to William Glasgow Reynolds, a patent lawyer for E.I. du Pont de Nemours & Company and Nancy Bradford du Pont.

He attended Phillips Academy in Andover, Massachusetts before attending Yale University, where he graduated with a bachelor's degree in 1964. Reynolds then attended and graduated with a LL.B. from Vanderbilt University Law School in 1967, where he was Order of the Coif and editor-in-chief of the Vanderbilt Law Review. In 1964, he received a B.A. from Yale University.

He worked as an associate at the law firm Sullivan & Cromwell in New York before taking on an assistant job in 1970 to Solicitor General Erwin N. Griswold in Washington. Three years later, he joined the law firm of Shaw, Pittman, Potts & Trowbridge, where he worked prior to his appointment to the Reagan Administration.

== Administrative career ==
In May 1981, Reynolds was chosen to serve as an Assistant Attorney General for civil rights. While his expertise was primarily in commercial litigation, he stated that his qualifications for the position was a background that would take a "hard, fresh look at the issue of remedies in the civil rights arena."

To many civil rights proponents in the 1980s, Reynolds was the quintessence of Reagan-era policies against civil rights enforcement. The civil rights division of the Justice Department was created by President Dwight Eisenhower in 1957. The Washington Post wrote in 1988 that Reynolds "will have a place in the history books as the first assistant attorney general for civil rights to try to get the federal government, local governments and even the courts to halt a wide range of established civil rights reforms, from affirmative action to busing." According to Nicholas Katzenbach:

The department is supposed to defend the disadvantaged, the people who are victims of discrimination. Either Mr. Reynolds doesn't understand what civil rights is all about or he is not interested in the pursuit of equality. Rights for Americans seems to him to mean rights for white males.

J. Harvie Wilkinson III, who worked as a deputy for Reynolds in 1982-83, argued that Reynolds (who argued for an open dialogue to issues rather than what Wilkinson called "uncontrovertible conventional wisdom") took much of the heat within the perception of the public and the Justice Department for his belief "in a quality education for all and that busing young students far from home was not a productive use of a child’s day." Among the instances of Reynolds being unsuccessful with legal fights included a 1983 fight that saw Reynolds try to combat the IRS when the tax status of Bob Jones University was removed due to not allowing black people to attend the school, which was unsuccessful. Two years later, he made an unsuccessful request to President Reagan to remove the requirement that firms doing business with the government must have affirmative action programs to hire minorities. In other matters, Reynolds served as one of three aides that assisted Attorney General Edwin Meese conduct his initial inquiry into the Iran-Contra Affair.

Reynolds was tapped for nomination for Associate Attorney General in 1985, which meant he would be subjected to the Senate Judiciary Committee. He was called "mean spirited", "rigid" and the "Scrooge of the Justice Department", "the principal architect of a comprehensive attack on our civil rights laws" and an "ideologue", with a "lack of respect for the Supreme Court and Congress". Other critics such as Senator Dennis DeConcini of Arizona contended that Reynolds simply had a habit of "bending and altering the truth", most notably when Reynolds apologized multiple times the week before the committee vote due to his recollection of discussing voting rights cases "may have failed him". On June 26, 1985, the committee voted to reject him by a vote of 10 to 8 (with two Republicans on the committee voting to join the eight Democrats on the no vote); motions to send the nomination to the Senate with no recommendation did not pass. Reynolds reportedly was "very hurt" by the rejection by the Senate. In 1987, with the departure of T. Kenneth Cribb, Reynolds to serve as counselor to Meese. With Meese having to deal with a criminal probe around ethical and legal matters, Reynolds was viewed as having more influence within the Justice Department. He was relieved of his duties as counselor in September 1988, one month after Dick Thornburgh succeeded Meese after his resignation. In November 1988, Reynolds announced he would resign from the civil rights department, effective on December 9.

== Personal life and death ==
Reynolds was married twice; he married Marguerite Lynn Morgan in 1964 and had four children with her prior to their divorce in 1984. He married Clare Matisans, a bookkeeper in the Arlington public school system in 1987.

He died of cancer on September 14, 2019, in Seabrook Island, South Carolina at age 77.

Legal offices
Preceded by Drew S. Days III	United States Assistant Attorney General for the Civil Rights Division; 1981–1988	Succeeded by William C. Lucas & James P. Turner; Acting; John R. Dunne; Fulltime
