= Clear Lake, Wisconsin =

- Village
- Location of Clear Lake in Polk County, Wisconsin
- Coordinates: 45°15′37″N 92°13′33″W
- Country: United States
- State: Wisconsin
- County: Polk

Area
  - Total: 2.63 sq mi (6.81 km^{2})
  - Land: 2.60 sq mi (6.74 km^{2})
  - Water: 0.027 sq mi (0.07 km^{2})
- Elevation: 1,171 ft (357 m)

Population (2020)
  - Total: 1,099
  - Density: 422/sq mi (163.1/km^{2})
- Time zone: UTC-6 (Central (CST))
  - Summer (DST): UTC-5 (CDT)
- ZIP code: 54005
- Area codes: 715 & 534
- FIPS code: 55-15275
- GNIS feature ID: 1582972
- Website: www.clearlake-wi.gov

Clear Lake is a village in Polk County, Wisconsin, United States. The population was 1,099 at the 2020 census. The village is adjacent to the Town of Clear Lake along U.S. Highway 63.

== Geography ==
Clear Lake is located at 45°15′1″N 92°16′18″W (45.250315, −92.271909).

According to the United States Census Bureau, the village has a total area of 2.63 square miles (6.81 km^{2}), of which 2.6 square miles (6.73 km^{2}) is land and 0.03 square miles (0.08 km^{2}) is water.

== Demographics ==
Historical population
Census	Pop.	Note	%±
1880	476		—
1900	527		—
1910	498		−5.5%
1920	689		38.4%
1930	733		6.4%
1940	670		−8.6%
1950	695		3.7%
1960	724		4.2%
1970	721		−0.4%
1980	899		24.7%
1990	932		3.7%
2000	1,051		12.8%
2010	1,070		1.8%
2020	1,099		2.7%
U.S. Decennial Census

=== 2010 census ===
As of the census of 2010, 1,070 people, 459 households, and 282 families lived in the village. The population density was 363.9 inhabitants per square mile (140.5/km^{2}). The 502 housing units had an average density of 170.7 per square mile (65.9/km^{2}). The racial makeup of the village was 97.4% White, 0.1% Native American, 0.2% Asian], 0.9% from other races, and 1.4% from two or more races. Hispanics or Latinos of any race were 2.8% of the population.

Of the 459 households, 30.5% had children under 18 living with them, 42.7% were married couples living together, 13.1% had a female householder with no husband present, 5.7% had a male householder with no wife present, and 38.6% were not families. About 33.6% of all households were made up of individuals, and 14.4% had someone living alone who was 65 or older. The average household size was 2.32, and the average family size was 2.94.

The median age in the village was 37.9 years. About 25.8% of residents were under 18, 7.1% were 18 to 24, 24.5% were 25 to 44, 26.4% were 45 to 64, and 16% were 65 or older. The gender makeup of the village was 48.8% male and 51.2% female.

=== 2000 census ===
As of the census of 2000, 1,051 people, 453 households, and 261 families were residing in the village. The population density was 397.1 people per square mile (153.1/km^{2}). The 478 housing units had an average density of 180.6 per square mile (69.6/km^{2}). The racial makeup of the village was 97.91% White, 0.57% Native American, 0.19% Asian, 0.57% from other races, and 0.76% from two or more races. About 3.14% of the population were Hispanics or Latinos of any race.

Of the 453 households, 27.4% had children under 18 living with them, 46.6% were married couples living together, 8.6% had a female householder with no husband present, and 42.2% were not families. About 36% of all households were made up of individuals, and 23.6% had someone living alone who was 65 or older. The average household size was 2.3, and the average family size was 3.03.

In the village, the age distribution was 24.5% under 18, 8.5% from 18 to 24, 26.3% from 25 to 44, 18.7% from 45 to 64, and 22.1% who were 65 or older. The median age was 39 years. For every 100 females, there were 90.7 males. For every 100 females 18 and over, there were 88.2 males.

The median income for a household in the village was $32,269, and for a family was $44,219. Males had a median income of $31,313 versus $22,917 for females. The per capita income for the village was $16,564. About 4.1% of families and 7.5% of the population were below the poverty line, including 5.1% of those under age 18 and 12.3% of those age 65 or over.

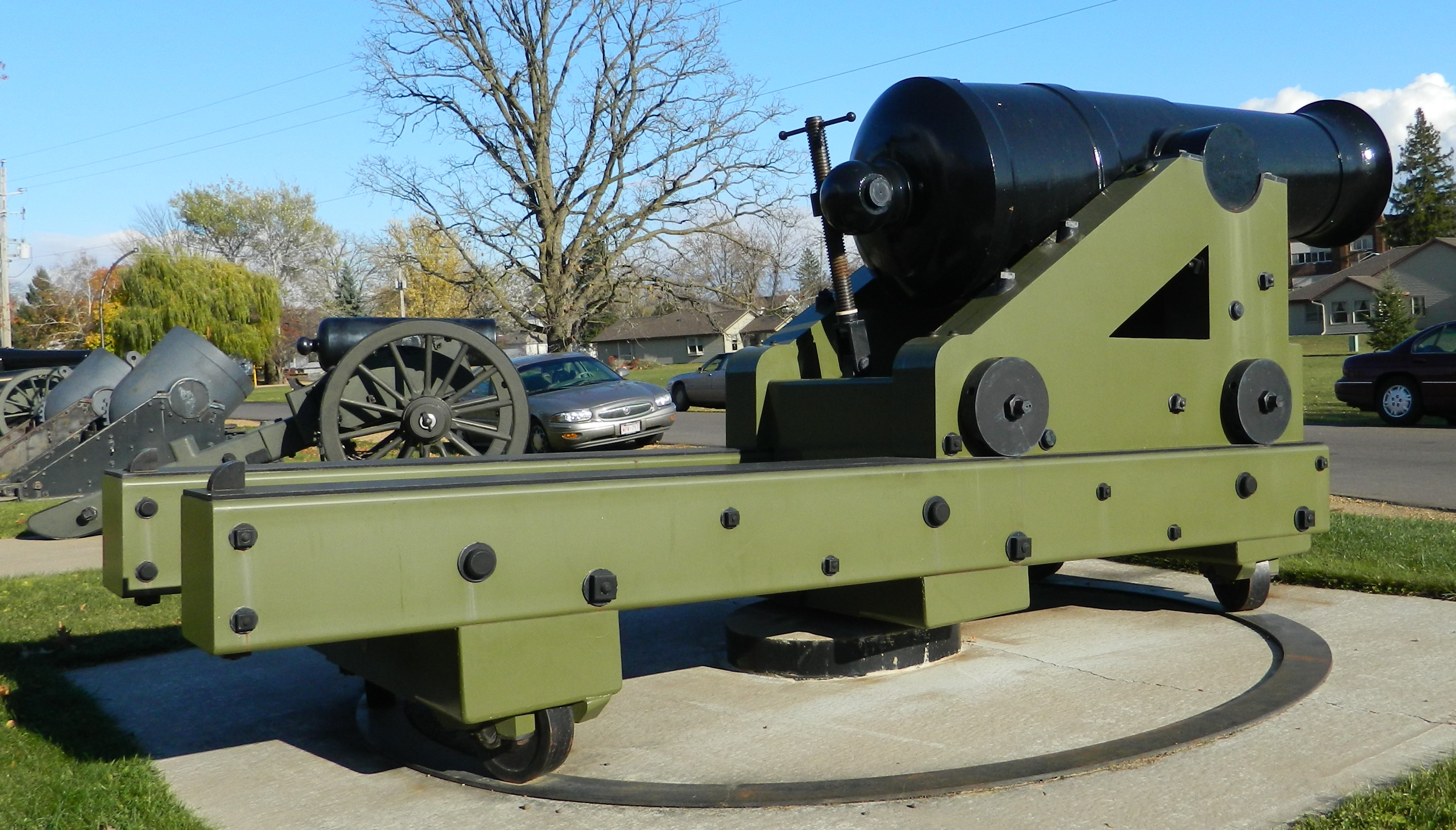
Old guns on display

== Culture ==
- Clear Lake has five Christian churches, representing various denominations.
- The Clear Lake All-Veteran's Memorial in Clear Lake Cemetery commemorates 1,700 local veterans on seven granite monuments.
- Clear Lake High School has posted only individual state champions in track and field and wrestling.
- Clear Lake is home to a five-time state champion and two-time global champion Destination ImagiNation team.
- In November 2007, a Hollywood film titled Clear Lake, WI, starring Michael Madsen, was filmed in the Clear Lake area.

== Notable people ==
- Burleigh Grimes – Hall of Fame Major League Baseball pitcher and manager (1916–1935)
- Adam M. Jarchow – lawyer and politician
- Gaylord Nelson – former Wisconsin governor and United States senator, founder of Earth Day
