= William Kasik =

American politician (1920–1986)

Member of the Wisconsin State Assembly from the Milwaukee 19th district
- In office 1955–1957
- Succeeded by: Jerris Leonard

Personal details
- Born: June 13, 1920 Milwaukee
- Died: March 1986 (aged 65)
- Party: Republican
- Education: University School of Milwaukee
- Profession: Insurance Agent

William R. Kasik (June 13, 1920 – March 1986) was a Wisconsin businessman and insurance agent who served one term as a Republican member of the Wisconsin State Assembly from the 19th Milwaukee County district.

== Background ==
Kasik was born in Milwaukee on June 13, 1920, and attended Milwaukee Country Day School and Milwaukee University School. He served in the United States Army during World War II, in 1942 and 1943. He was serving as vice-president of English Woolen Mills when he was elected to the Assembly.

== Legislative service ==
In 1954, Kasik was nominated to the Assembly from the 19th Milwaukee County district, which included the Town of Milwaukee (but not the City of Milwaukee itself), Bayside, Fox Point, Glendale, Granville, River Hills, Shorewood, and Whitefish Bay. Prior to redistricting, most of the district had been represented by fellow Republican Arthur R. Godar. He was nominated with only a plurality of votes in the Republican primary (2982 votes, to 2679 for Ervin Schneeberg and 613 for Henry Gefke); but had less trouble in the general election, defeating Democrat Stanley Lieberman by 15,685 to 6778. He was assigned to the standing committees on insurance and banking, and on taxation; and to a special committee on Urban Development (which was studying issues of annexation of particular concern to his suburban district). He was one of the sponsors of an unsuccessful bill for a statewide referendum in favor of a right-to-work law.

In 1956, Kasik (described as a "conservative Republican") served as an Eisenhower delegate to the 1956 Republican National Convention. He ran for the Republican nomination for the 4th Wisconsin State Senate district, losing narrowly (8803 to 8903) to eventual winner Kirby Hendee in a three-way primary race in which he carried the rest of the district, but lost by a hefty margin in Hendee's home village of Shorewood. Kasik was succeeded by fellow Republican Jerris Leonard.

== After the Assembly ==
At a 1957 Milwaukee County Republican meeting, Kasik referred to the state's United States senators Alexander Wiley and Joe McCarthy (themselves both Republicans) as "the senior [and] the junior windbags from Wisconsin".

In 1964, Kasik (now living in Mequon and working as an insurance agent) was one of three challengers to incumbent State Representative (and Assistant Majority Leader) J. Curtis McKay of Ozaukee County (a Goldwater supporter) in the Republican primary, coming in second with 1495 to McKay's 2317; McKay went on to win re-election in the general election, although the Goldwater candidacy was generally considered a disaster for the Republican Party statewide.

In 1979, Kasik was again a candidate for a Republican assembly nomination, but his candidacy was clouded by allegations that he had borrowed excessively from his mother's estate; he came in a distant third, with less than one-fourth the votes of eventual victor Betty Jo Nelsen.
