= David Luke Norman =

American attorney

Associate Judge of the Superior Court of the District of Columbia
- In office 1973–1983
- Appointed by: Richard Nixon
- Succeeded by: Nan R. Huhn

7th United States Assistant Attorney General for the Civil Rights Division
- In office August 19, 1971 – 1973
- President: Richard Nixon
- Preceded by: Jerris Leonard
- Succeeded by: John Stanley Pottinger

Personal details
- Born: October 12, 1924; Stromsburg, Nebraska
- Died: February 6, 1995 (aged 70); Washington, D.C.
- Political party: Republican

David Luke Norman (October 12, 1924 – February 6, 1995) was an American attorney who served as the United States Assistant Attorney General for the Civil Rights Division from 1971 to 1973 and as an Associate Judge of the Superior Court of the District of Columbia from 1973 to 1983.

He died of pneumonia on February 6, 1995, in Washington, D.C. at age 70.
