= 1974 United States Senate election in Wisconsin =

- November 5, 1974
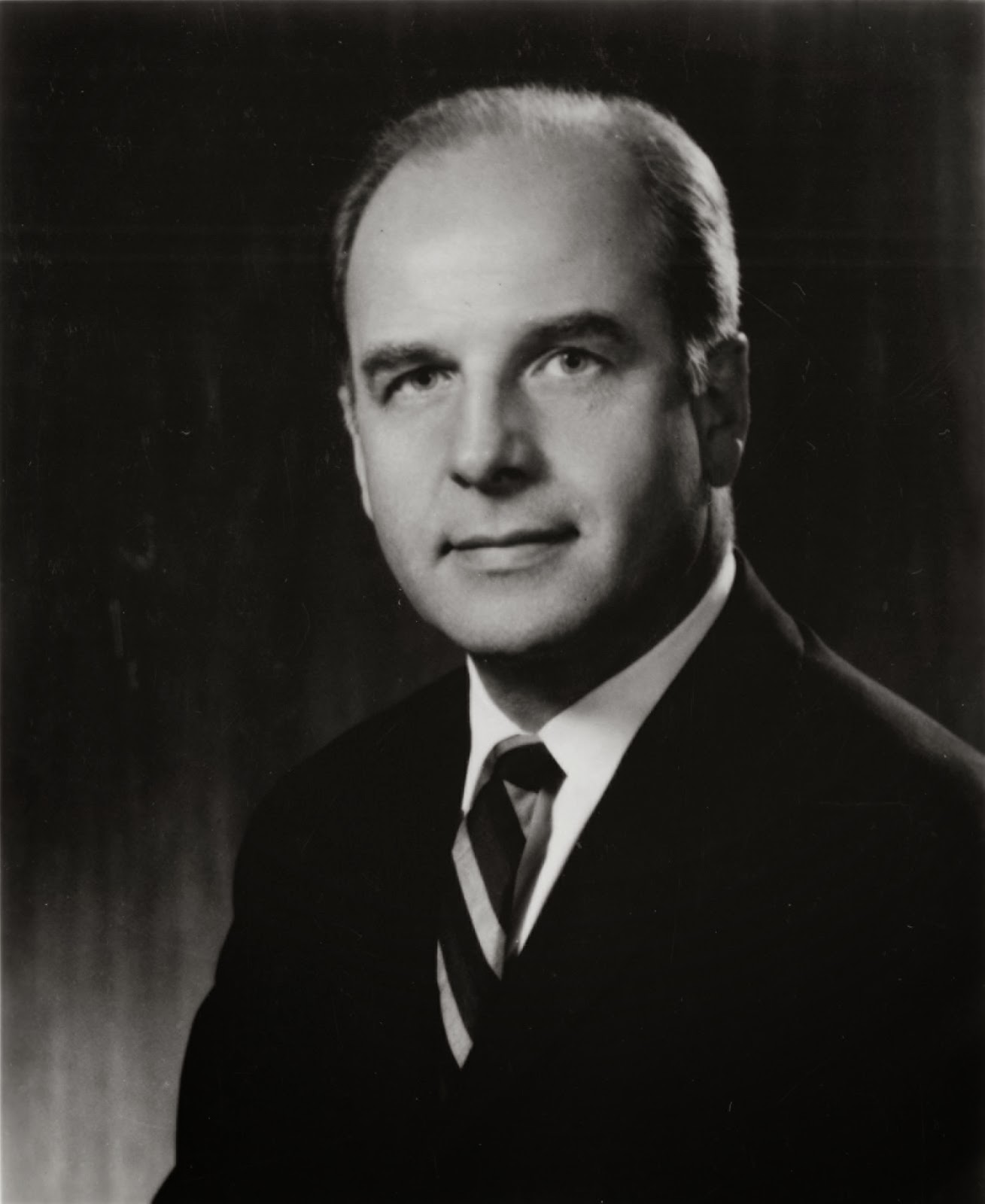

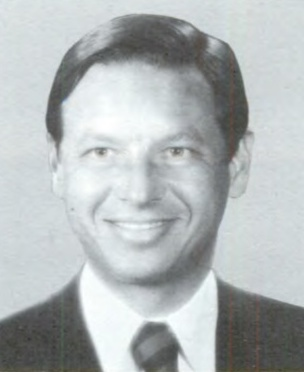
Nominee	Gaylord Nelson	Tom Petri
Party	Democratic	Republican
Popular vote	740,700	429,327
Percentage	61.75%	35.79%
- County results Nelson: 50–60% 60–70% 70–80% 80–90% Petri: 50–60% 60–70%
U.S. senator before election
Gaylord Nelson
Democratic
Elected U.S. Senator
Gaylord Nelson
Democratic

The 1974 United States Senate election in Wisconsin was held on November 5, 1974. Incumbent Democratic U.S. Senator Gaylord Nelson won re-election to a third term.

== Major candidates ==
=== Democratic ===
- Gaylord Nelson, incumbent U.S. senator since 1963

=== Republican ===
- Tom Petri, State Senator since 1973

== Results ==
General election results
Party	Candidate	Votes	%	±%
Democratic	Gaylord Nelson (incumbent)	740,700	61.75%	+0.06%
Republican	Tom Petri	429,327	35.79%	−2.52%
American	Gerald L. McFarren	24,003	2.00%	N/A
Lowering the Property Tax	Roman Blenski	5,396	0.45%	N/A

== See also ==
- United States Senate elections, 1974 and 1975
