= Ernest A. Young =

American law professor

Ernest A. Young Ernest A. Young
- Born: 1968 (age 57–58); Abilene, Texas, U.S.

Academic background
- Education: Harvard University; Dartmouth College

Academic work
- Discipline: Constitutional law

Ernest A. Young (born 1968) is a professor and author of constitutional law, the federal courts, and foreign relations law. He is an Alston & Bird Professor of Law at Duke University School of Law. Young is considered to be one of America's leading authorities on the constitutional law of federalism, and has researched and written extensively on the Rehnquist Court's "Federalist Revival".

== Education and career ==
Young was born in Abilene, Texas, in 1968. Beginning in 1999 he served as the Charles Alan Wright Chair in Federal Courts at the University of Texas at Austin School of Law, where he was a professor of law. In 2008 he joined the Duke Law faculty. Young graduated from Dartmouth College in 1990 and he earned his J.D. in 1993 from Harvard University. After law school, he served as a law clerk to Judge Michael Boudin of the 1st U.S. Circuit Court of Appeals (1993–94) and to Justice David Souter of the U.S. Supreme Court (1995–96). Young was elected to the American Law Institute in 2006. He was also a visiting professor at Harvard Law School and Villanova University School of Law, and an adjunct professor at Georgetown University Law Center.

Young has written on constitutional interpretation and constitutional theory. He has also studied in the area of maritime law and comparative constitutional law. He has also devoted much research and writing on the Rehnquist Court's "Federalist Revival".

== Awards ==
Young has earned several scholarly awards, which include:

- The Texas Exes Teaching Excellence Award, from the University of Texas
- The Paul M. Bator Award for excellence in teaching, scholarship, and public service, from the Federalist Society (2005)
- The Robert Murff Excellence Award from the Texas Campus Career Council for counseling law students as a judicial clerkship advisor.

== Works ==
- Young, Ernest A. (1999). "State Sovereign Immunity and the Future of Federalism". The Supreme Court Review. 1999. The University of Chicago Press: 1–79. doi:10.1086/scr.1999.3109705. JSTOR 3109705. S2CID 141988423.
- ——; Baker, Lynn A. (October 2001). "Federalism and the Double Standard of Judicial Review". Duke Law Journal. 51 (1). Duke University School of Law: 75–164. doi:10.2307/1373231. JSTOR 1373231.
- —— (November 2005). "Foreign Law and the Denominator Problem". Harvard Law Review. 119 (1). Harvard Law Review Association: 148–167. JSTOR 4093563.
- —— (December 2007). "The Constitution outside the Constitution". The Yale Law Journal. 117 (3). The Yale Law Journal Company, Inc.: 408–473. doi:10.2307/20455798. JSTOR 20455798.
- ——; Benjamin, Stuart Minor (May 2008). "Tennis with the Net down: Administrative Federalism without Congress". Duke Law Journal. 57 (7). Duke University School of Law: 2111–2155. JSTOR 40040641.
- —— (2012). The Supreme Court and the constitutional structure. New York, NY : Foundation Press, Thomson/West. ISBN 978-1-5994-1740-0.
- —— (2014). "The Puzzling Persistence of Dual Federalism". Nomos. 55. American Society for Political and Legal Philosophy: 34–82. JSTOR 24220374.
- —— (August 2015). "Federalism as a Constitutional Principle". University of Cincinnati Law Review. 83 (4). University of Cincinnati: 1057–1082.

== See also ==
- Constitution of the United States
- Bibliography of the United States Constitution
