= 1968 United States Senate election in Wisconsin =

- November 5, 1968
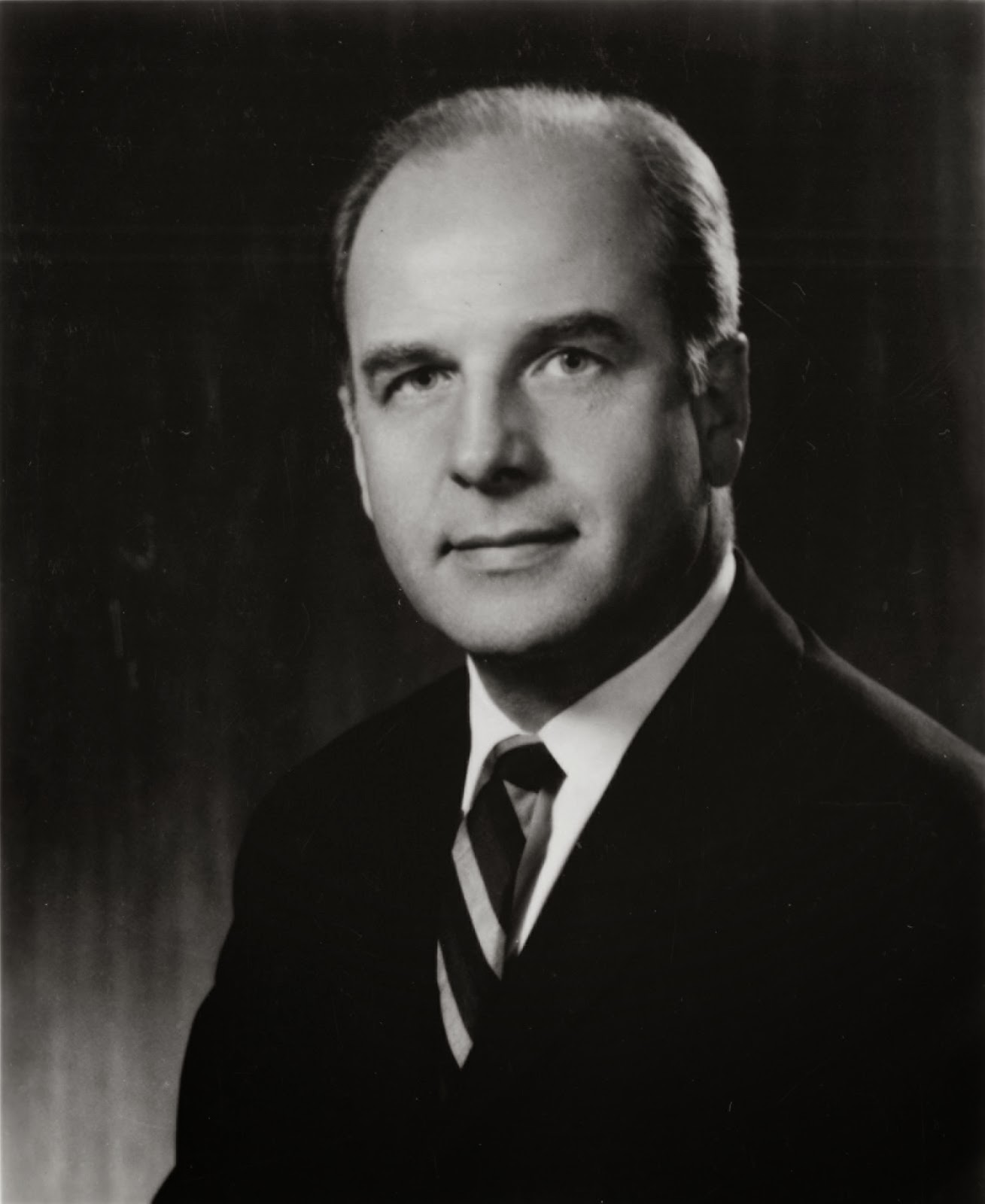

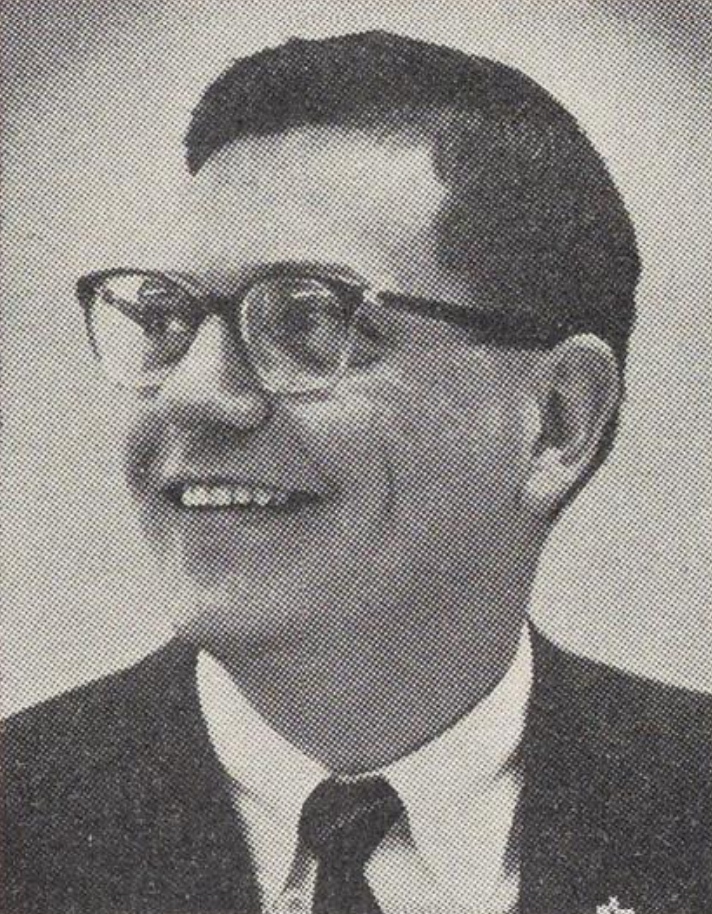
Nominee	Gaylord Nelson	Jerris Leonard
Party	Democratic	Republican
Popular vote	1,020,931	633,910
Percentage	61.69%	38.31%
- County results Nelson: 50–60% 60–70% 70–80% 80–90% Leonard: 50–60%
U.S. senator before election
Gaylord Nelson
Democratic
Elected U.S. Senator
Gaylord Nelson
Democratic

In the 1968 United States Senate election in Wisconsin, incumbent Democrat Gaylord A. Nelson defeated Republican Jerris Leonard.

== Major candidates ==
=== Democratic ===
- Gaylord Nelson, incumbent U.S. Senator since 1963

=== Republican ===
- Jerris Leonard, State Senator

== Results ==
General election results
Party	Candidate	Votes	%	±%
Democratic	Gaylord Nelson (incumbent)	1,020,931	61.69%	?
Republican	Jerris Leonard	633,910	38.31%	?

== See also ==
- United States Senate elections, 1968
