= Verna Manders =

American politician

Verna Manders (April 10, 1920 – April 1, 2010) was an American legislator, saleswoman, and receptionist.

Born in Green Bay, Wisconsin, Manders worked as a saleswoman, receptionist, factory worker, crossing guard. In 1967, Manders was elected in a special election, to the Wisconsin State Assembly, to succeed her husband Adrian Manders, who died in office. Manders was elected as a Democrat from Milwaukee, Wisconsin. Manders died in Milwaukee.
