= Adrian Manders =

American politician

Adrian Manders (April 17, 1912 – June 22, 1967) was an American politician.

Born in Wrightstown, Wisconsin, Manders was a sheet metal technician and real estate broker. He served as a Democratic in the Wisconsin State Assembly from Milwaukee, Wisconsin from 1961 to 1967, when he died in office from a heart attack. His wife Verna was elected in a special election to succeed her husband.
