= Daniel D. Hanna =

American politician

Daniel D. Hanna (1923-1993) was a member of the Wisconsin State Assembly.

== Biography ==
Hanna was born on December 5, 1923, in Milwaukee, Wisconsin. After graduating from high school in St. Francis, Wisconsin. Hanna attended Marquette University, the University of Illinois at Urbana-Champaign and the University of Oregon. During World War II, he served in the United States Army Medical Corps. Hanna died on June 21, 1993.

== Political career ==
Hanna was first elected to the Assembly in 1964. Previously, he was Supervisor of Lake, Milwaukee County, Wisconsin. He was a Democrat.

Wisconsin State Assembly
Preceded by Nile Soik	Member of the Wisconsin State Assembly from the 19th Milwaukee County district 1965–1973	Constituency abolished
