= Nile Soik =

American politician (1923-2001)

Member of the Wisconsin Senate from the 4th district
- In office January 6, 1969 – January 1, 1973
- Preceded by: Jerris Leonard
- Succeeded by: Bob Kasten

Member of the Wisconsin State Assembly
- In office January 4, 1965 – January 6, 1969
- Preceded by: District established
- Succeeded by: Jim Sensenbrenner
- Constituency: Milwaukee 25th district
- In office January 2, 1961 – January 4, 1965
- Preceded by: Jerris Leonard
- Succeeded by: Daniel D. Hanna
- Constituency: Milwaukee 19th district

Personal details
- Born: May 2, 1923 Milwaukee, Wisconsin, U.S.
- Died: August 3, 2001 (aged 78) Whitefish Bay, Wisconsin, U.S.
- Resting place: West Point Cemetery, West Point, New York
- Party: Republican
- Spouse: Carol Swanson (m. 1950–2001)
- Education: United States Military Academy; University of Wisconsin–Madison (M.B.A.); Cornell University (Ph.D.)

Military service
- Allegiance: United States
- Branch/service: United States Army; Army Corps of Engineers
- Rank: 1st Lieutenant

Nile Warren Soik (May 2, 1923 – August 3, 2001) was an American educator and Republican politician from Milwaukee, Wisconsin. He served four years in the Wisconsin Senate (1969–1973) and eight years in the Wisconsin State Assembly (1961–1969), representing northern Milwaukee County.

== Biography ==
Born in Milwaukee, Wisconsin, Soik graduated from Riverside University High School. He then graduated from the United States Military Academy in 1945 and served in the United States Army. Soik received his master's degree in business administration from University of Wisconsin–Madison in 1951 and his doctorate degree at Cornell University. Soik was a trainer in the human resource department at Allen-Bradley. He also taught at Milwaukee School of Engineering, Lakeland College, Marquette University, Milwaukee Area Technical College, and Cardinal Stritch University. He served in the Wisconsin State Assembly in 1961-1969 as a Republican and then in the Wisconsin State Senate in 1969–1973. He died in Whitefish Bay, Wisconsin.

Wisconsin State Assembly
Preceded by Jerris Leonard	Member of the Wisconsin State Assembly from the Milwaukee 19th district 1961–1965	Succeeded by Daniel D. Hanna
New constituency	Member of the Wisconsin State Assembly from the Milwaukee 25th district 1965–1969	Succeeded by Jim Sensenbrenner
Wisconsin Senate
Preceded by Jerris Leonard	Member of the Wisconsin Senate from the 4th district 1969–1973	Succeeded by Bob Kasten
