= Gaylord Nelson =

American politician (1916–2005)

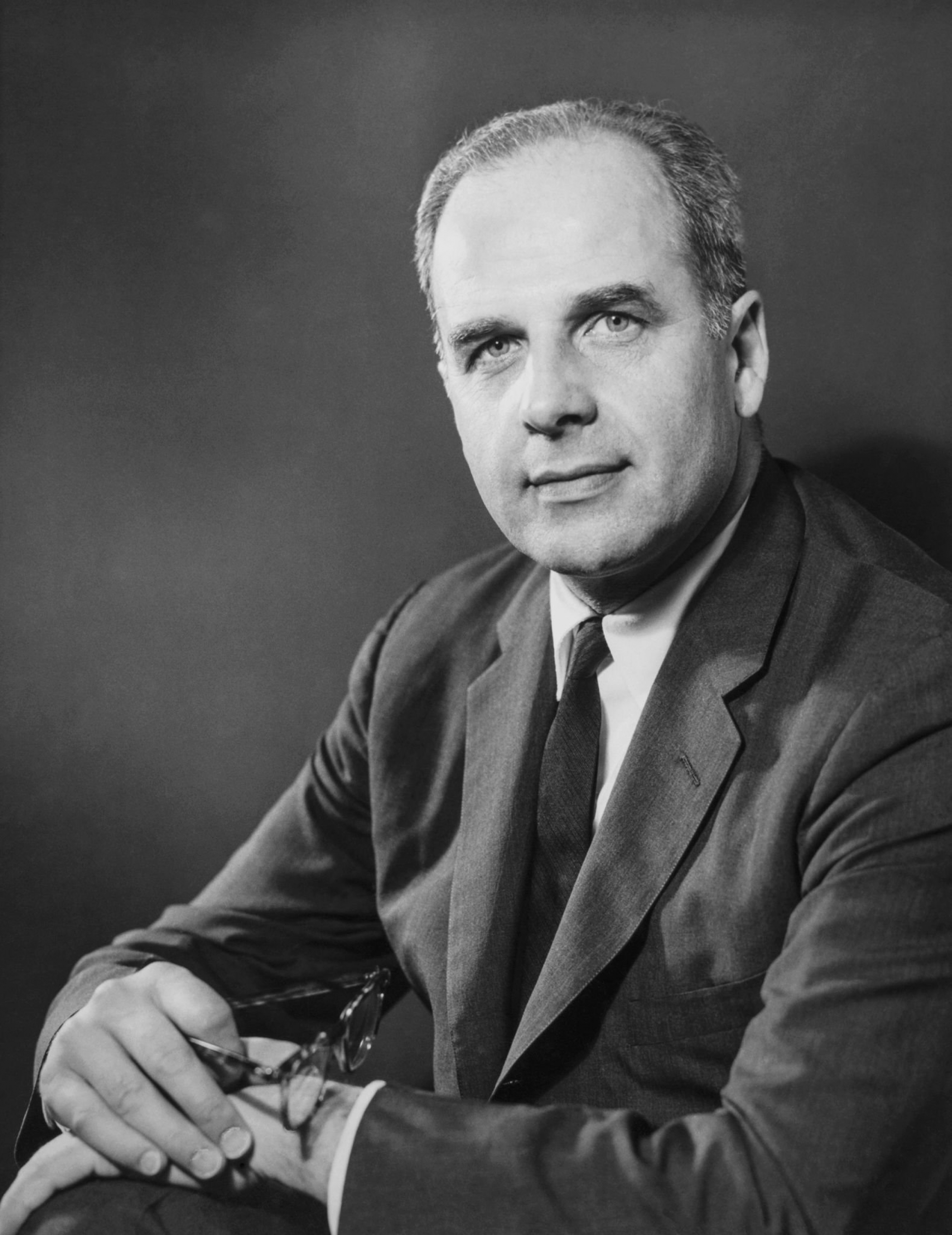
- Nelson in 1963

United States Senator from Wisconsin
- In office January 8, 1963 – January 3, 1981
- Preceded by: Alexander Wiley
- Succeeded by: Bob Kasten
Senate positions
Chair of the Senate Select Committee on Small Business
In office December 17, 1974 – January 3, 1981
Preceded by	Alan Bible
Succeeded by	Lowell Weicker (standing committee)

35th Governor of Wisconsin
- In office January 5, 1959 – January 7, 1963
- Lieutenant: Philleo Nash; Warren P. Knowles
- Preceded by: Vernon Wallace Thomson
- Succeeded by: John W. Reynolds Jr.

Member of the Wisconsin State Senate from the 26th district
- In office January 3, 1949 – January 5, 1959
- Preceded by: Fred Risser
- Succeeded by: Horace W. Wilkie

Personal details
- Born: Gaylord Anton Nelson; June 4, 1916 Clear Lake, Wisconsin, U.S.
- Died: July 3, 2005 (aged 89) Kensington, Maryland, U.S.
- Resting place: Clear Lake Cemetery, Clear Lake, Wisconsin
- Party: Democratic
- Spouse: Carrie Lee Dotson (m. 1947)
- Children: 3
- Education: San Jose State University (BA); University of Wisconsin–Madison (LLB)
- Awards: Presidential Medal of Freedom (1995)

Military service
- Allegiance: United States
- Branch/service: United States Army
- Battles/wars: World War II

Gaylord Anton Nelson (June 4, 1916 – July 3, 2005) was an American lawyer, Democratic politician, and environmentalist from Wisconsin. He served three terms as a United States senator from Wisconsin, from 1963 to 1981, and was chairman of the Senate Select Committee on Small Business for the last six years of his tenure. During his time in the U.S. Senate, he was the creator of Earth Day, which launched a new wave of environmental activism. After losing his bid for re-election in 1980, he continued his environmental activism as counselor for The Wilderness Society, and was honored with a Presidential Medal of Freedom for his environmental efforts by President Bill Clinton.

Before his election to the U.S. Senate, Nelson was the 35th governor of Wisconsin, serving two terms from 1959 to 1963, and represented Dane County for ten years in the Wisconsin Senate (1949–1959); when he was elected governor in 1958, Nelson was the first Democrat to win a gubernatorial election in Wisconsin since 1932, and only the second in the 20th century. He was a key figure in the merging of the remnants of the Wisconsin Progressive Party into the Democratic Party of Wisconsin through the 1940s and 1950s, transforming the Democrats from a permanent minority in the state to a viable contender for state offices.

== Early life and education ==
Nelson was born in 1916 in Clear Lake, Wisconsin, the son of Mary (Bradt), a nurse, and Anton Nelson, a country doctor. He had Norwegian and Irish ancestry. He grew up and was educated in the local public schools. In 1939, he received a bachelor's in political science at what is now San Jose State University in San Jose, California. In 1942, he received an LL.B. degree from the University of Wisconsin Law School in Madison and was admitted to the bar. He practiced as a lawyer before serving in the United States Army, during which time he saw action in the Okinawa campaign during World War II. He rose to the rank of first lieutenant.

== Politics ==
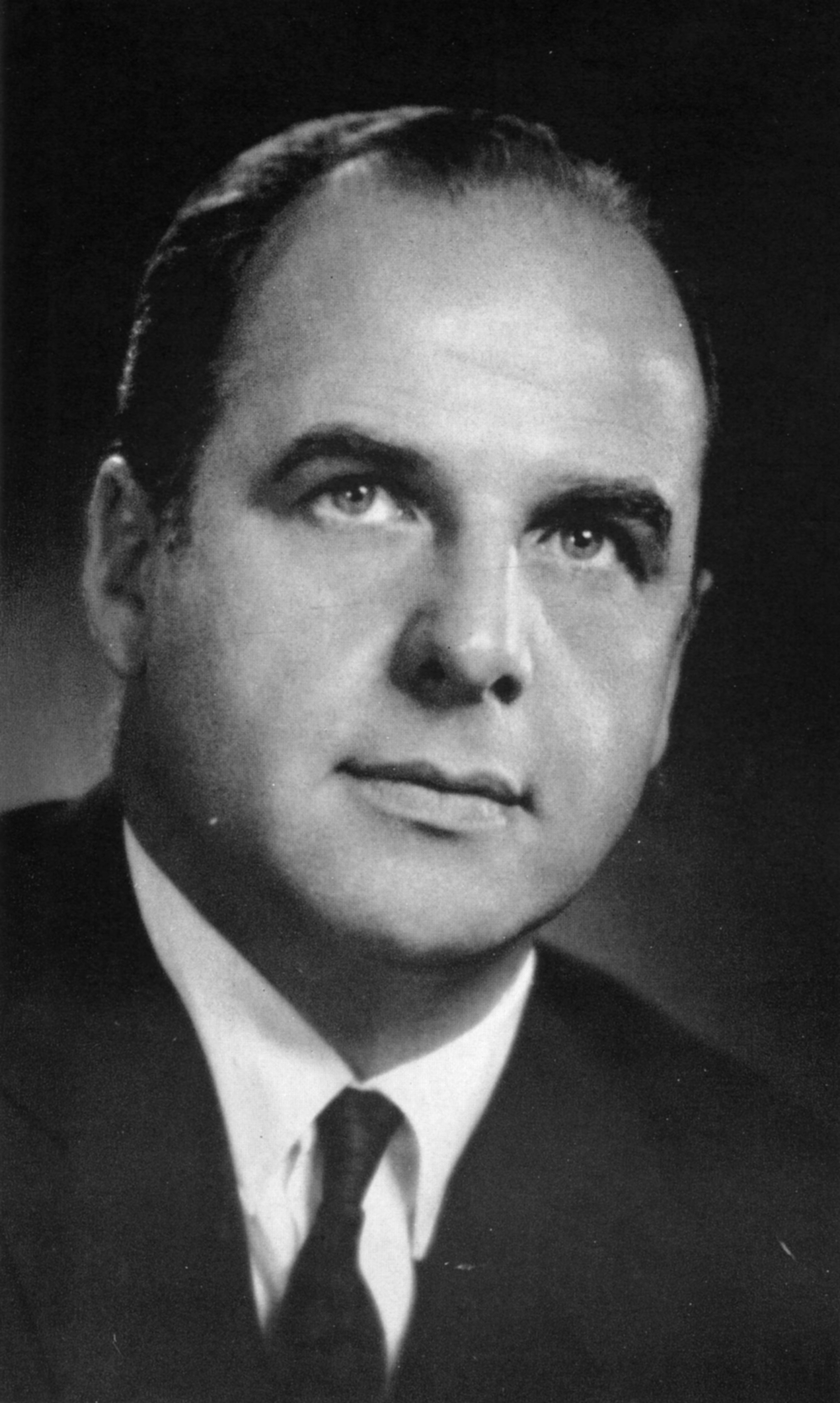
Nelson as Governor c. 1961

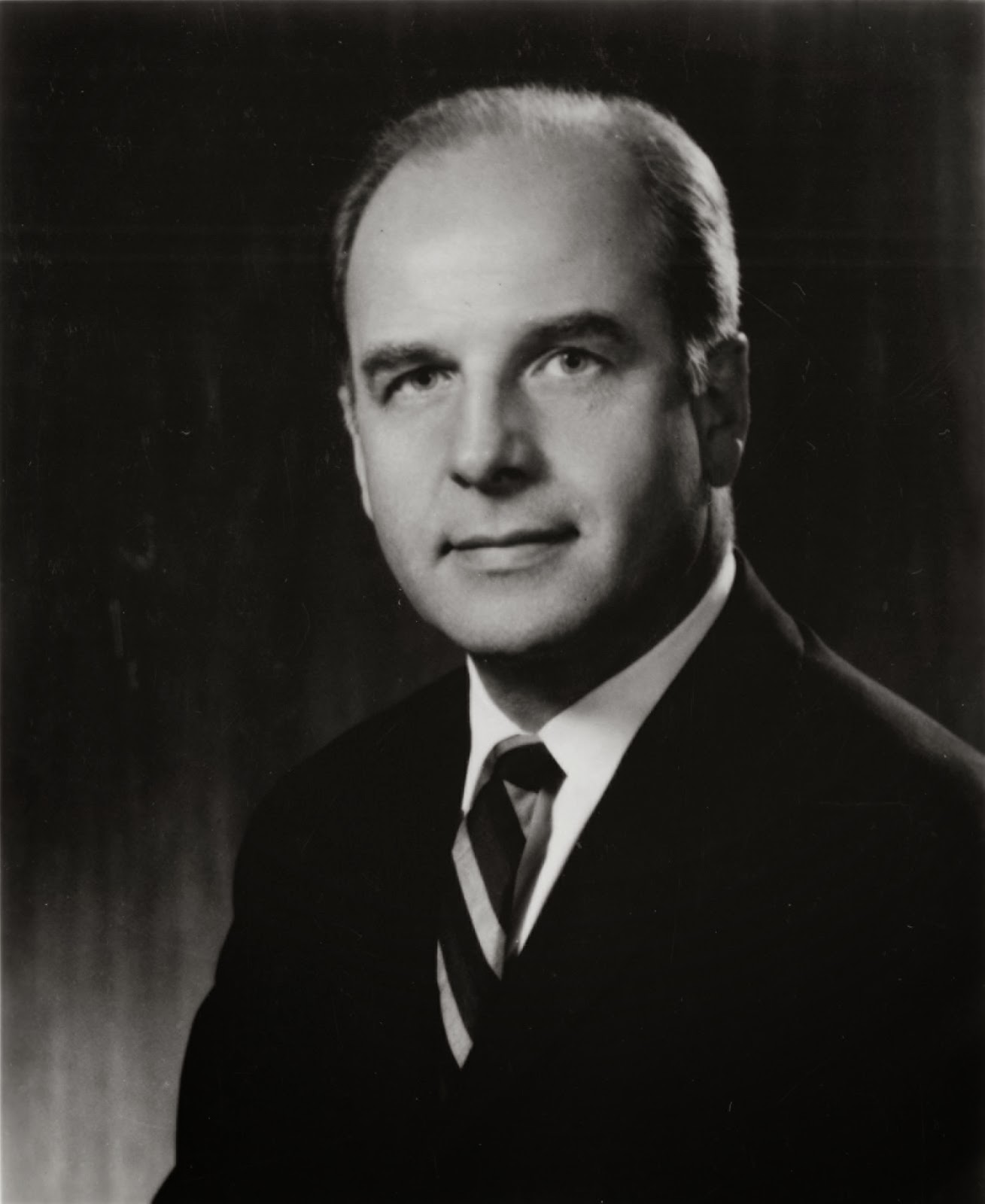
Nelson as U.S. Senator

In 1948, Nelson was elected to the Wisconsin State Senate. He remained there until 1958, when he was elected governor of Wisconsin. He served for four years as governor, in two two-year terms, before being elected to the United States Senate in 1962. He served three consecutive terms as a senator from 1963 to 1981. In 1963, he convinced President John F. Kennedy to take a national speaking tour to discuss conservation issues. Senator Nelson founded Earth Day, which began as a teach-in about environmental issues on April 22, 1970. During Congressional debate on air pollution and emissions from automobiles in 1970, Nelson also sponsored an amendment to the Clean Air Act which would have phased out gasoline-powered automobiles in favor of electric or steam-powered vehicles. The bill was defeated due to lobbying from automotive manufacturers.

During his 1968 re-election campaign, Nelson was praised by Vince Lombardi, the General Manager and former coach of the Green Bay Packers, as the "nation's #1 conservationist" at a banquet in Oshkosh. Nelson's campaign turned Lombardi's banquet speech into a radio and television campaign commercial, infuriating Lombardi, the Wisconsin Republican Party, and Vince's wife, Marie, who was a staunch Republican.

Although known primarily for his environmental work, Nelson also was a leading consumer advocate, strong supporter of civil rights and civil liberties, and one of the early outspoken opponents of the Vietnam War. In 1969, Nelson was one of four senators to introduce a bill to establish the Wisconsin Islands Wilderness.

In 1970, Nelson called for Congressional hearings on the safety of combined oral contraceptive pills, which were famously called "The Nelson Pill Hearings." As a result of the hearings, side-effect disclosure in patient inserts was required for the pill – the first such disclosure for a pharmaceutical drug.

Nelson further attempted to overhaul how pharmaceuticals were marketed, proposing a bill that would require drug manufacturers to prove both the safety and efficacy of their marketed drugs in 1971. His office received a memorandum in 1975 stating that both Sominex and its competitor Compoz had been shown ineffective when compared to placebos, in spite of the US$34 million spent on sleeping aids in 1974.

Nelson was also a noted advocate of small business. While chairman of the Senate Small Business Committee, he led successful efforts to authorize the first modern White House Conference on Small Business, create the system of Small Business Development Centers at U.S. universities, and improve the way that federal agencies regulate small businesses and other small entities, the Regulatory Flexibility Act.

In 1973, Nelson was one of the three senators who opposed the nomination of Gerald Ford to be Vice President (the other two being Thomas Eagleton and William Hathaway).

== Environmentalism ==
After Nelson's 1980 defeat for re-election, he became counselor for The Wilderness Society in January 1981. He received the Presidential Medal of Freedom in September 1995 in recognition of his environmental work.

Nelson was inducted into the Wisconsin Conservation Hall of Fame in 1986. The Wisconsin Conservation Hall of fame is located at the Schmeeckle Reserve Visitor Center in Stevens Point, Wisconsin. The visitor center is maintained by the University of Wisconsin-Stevens Point.

Nelson viewed the stabilization of the nation's population as an important aspect of environmentalism. In his words:

The bigger the population gets, the more serious the problems become ... We have to address the population issue. The United Nations, with the U.S. supporting it, took the position in Cairo in 1994 that every country was responsible for stabilizing its own population. It can be done. But in this country, it's phony to say "I'm for the environment but not for limiting immigration."

He also rejected the suggestion that economic development should take precedence over environmental protection:

The economy is a wholly owned subsidiary of the environment, not the other way around.

In 2002, Nelson appeared on To Tell the Truth as a contestant, with his founding of Earth Day highlighted.

== Death and legacy ==
Nelson died of cardiovascular failure at age 89 on July 3, 2005.

The Gaylord Nelson Institute for Environmental Studies (or Nelson Institute) at the University of Wisconsin–Madison is named after him in recognition of his love for nature. In addition, the Gaylord Nelson Wilderness in the Apostle Islands National Lakeshore –comprising more than 80% of the land area of the park – was named after him in honor of his efforts to have the park created. Governor Nelson State Park near Waunakee, Wisconsin, is also named after him. The elementary school in Clear Lake, Wisconsin is named Gaylord A. Nelson Educational Center.

Party political offices
Preceded by William Proxmire	Democratic nominee for Governor of Wisconsin; 1958, 1960	Succeeded by John Reynolds
Preceded by Henry Maier	Democratic nominee for U.S. Senator from Wisconsin (Class 3); 1962, 1968, 1974, 1980	Succeeded by Ed Garvey
Wisconsin Senate
Preceded by Fred Risser	Member of the Wisconsin Senate from the 26th district January 3, 1949 – January 5, 1959	Succeeded by Horace W. Wilkie
Political offices
Preceded by Vernon Wallace Thomson	Governor of Wisconsin; 1959–1963	Succeeded by John Reynolds
U.S. Senate
Preceded by Alexander Wiley	U.S. Senator (Class 3) from Wisconsin; 1963–1981; Served alongside: William Proxmire	Succeeded by Bob Kasten
Preceded by Alan Bible	Chair of the Senate Small Business Committee; 1974–1981	Succeeded by Lowell P. Weicker Jr.
