= 84th Wisconsin Legislature =

Wisconsin legislative term for 1979–1980

←	83rd	85th	→
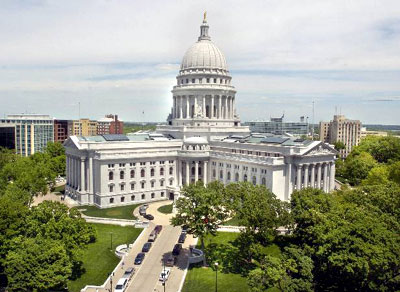
- Wisconsin State Capitol

Overview
- Legislative body: Wisconsin Legislature
- Meeting place: Wisconsin State Capitol
- Term: January 1, 1979 – January 5, 1981
- Election: November 7, 1978

Senate
- Members: 33
- Senate President: Russell Olson (R) ^{until May 1, 1979}; Fred Risser (D) ^{after May 1, 1979}
- President pro tempore: Fred Risser (D) ^{until May 1, 1979}
- Party control: Democratic

Assembly
- Members: 99
- Assembly Speaker: Edward Jackamonis (D)
- Speaker pro tempore: David Kedrowski (D)
- Party control: Democratic

Sessions
- Regular: January 3, 1979 – January 5, 1981

Special sessions
- Sep. 1979 Spec.: September 5, 1979 – September 5, 1979
- Jan. 1980 Spec.: January 22, 1980 – January 25, 1980
- Jun. 1980 Spec.: June 3, 1980 – July 3, 1980

The Eighty-Fourth Wisconsin Legislature convened from January 3, 1979, to January 5, 1981, in regular session, and also convened in three special sessions.

Senators representing odd-numbered districts were newly elected for this session and were serving the first two years of a four-year term. Assembly members were elected to a two-year term. Assembly members and odd-numbered senators were elected in the general election of November 7, 1978. Senators representing even-numbered districts were serving the third and fourth year of a four-year term, having been elected in the general election of November 2, 1976.

The governor of Wisconsin during this entire term was Republican Lee S. Dreyfus, of Portage County, serving the first two years of a four-year term, having won election in the 1978 Wisconsin gubernatorial election.

== Major events ==
- January 1, 1979: Inauguration of Lee S. Dreyfus as the 40th Governor of Wisconsin.
- March 28, 1979: A partial meltdown occurred at the Three Mile Island Nuclear Generating Station in Dauphin County, Pennsylvania.
- April 3, 1979: 1979 Wisconsin spring election:
  - Wisconsin voters approved four amendments to the state constitution:
    - Updating terms of the gubernatorial succession.
    - Providing that when there is a vacancy in the office of lieutenant governor, the governor can appoint a replacement with the consent of the Legislature.
    - Separating the office of Lieutenant Governor from the office of President of the Senate.
    - Making uniform the wording of the election terms for the three state administrative branch officials.
- November 4, 1979: 500 Iranian radicals, mostly students, invaded the U.S. Embassy in Tehran, taking 90 hostages and demanding that the United States return their recently deposed shah, Mohammad Reza Pahlavi, to stand trial in Iran.
- April 1, 1980: 1980 Wisconsin spring election:
  - Donald W. Steinmetz was elected to the Wisconsin Supreme Court to succeed Connor Hansen.
  - Ronald Reagan won the Wisconsin Republican presidential primary.
  - Jimmy Carter won the Wisconsin Democratic presidential primary.
- November 4, 1980: 1980 United States general election:
  - Ronald Reagan (R) elected President of the United States.
  - Bob Kasten (R) elected United States senator from Wisconsin.

== Major legislation ==
- 1979 Joint Resolution 3: Second legislative passage of four proposed amendments to the state constitution to clarify language about the gubernatorial succession, add a process by which the governor and legislature can fill a vacancy in the office of lieutenant governor, separate the office of Lieutenant Governor from the office of President of the Senate, and making uniform the language of the terms of election for the three administrative branch officials. All four amendments were ratified by voters at the April 1979 election.

== Party summary ==
=== Senate summary ===
Senate partisan composition Democratic: 21 seats Republican: 12 seats

	Party (Shading indicates majority caucus)		Total	
	Dem.	Rep.	Total	Vacant
End of previous Legislature	22	11	33	0
Start of Reg. Session (Note: Republicans Jim Sensenbrenner (4th District) and Ernest Keppler (20th District) resigned before the start of the session due election to other offices.)	21	10	31	2
From Apr. 3, 1979 (Note: Republican Tom Petri (2nd District) resigned after his election to the U.S. House of Representatives.)	21	9	30	3
From Apr. 17, 1979 (Note: Republicans Rod Johnston (4th District) and David W. Opitz (20th District) were sworn in to replace Jim Sensenbrenner and Ernest Keppler, respectively.)	21	11	32	1
From Jul. 11, 1979 (Note: Republican Don Hanaway (2nd District) was sworn in to replace Tom Petri.)	21	12	33	0
From Feb. 28, 1980 (Note: Republican Roger P. Murphy (33rd District) resigned after he was appointed a Wisconsin circuit court judge.)	21	11	32	1
From May 6, 1980 (Note: Republican Susan Engeleiter (33rd District) was sworn in to replace Roger P. Murphy.)	21	12	33	0
From Oct. 1, 1980 (Note: Democrat Peter D. Bear (13th District) resigned.)	20	12	32	1
From Oct. 22, 1980 (Note: Democrat Monroe Swan (6th District) was removed from office due to a criminal conviction.)	19	12	31	2
Final voting share	61.29%	35.48%		
Beginning of the next Legislature	20	13	33	0

=== Assembly summary ===
Assembly partisan composition Democratic: 60 seats Republican: 39 seats

	Party (Shading indicates majority caucus)		Total	
	Dem.	Rep.	Total	Vacant
End of previous Legislature	66	33	99	0
Start of Reg. Session	60	39	99	0
From Apr. 17, 1979 (Note: Republicans Rod Johnston (10th District) and David W. Opitz (60th District) resigned due to their elections to the state senate.)	60	37	97	2
From July 24, 1979 (Note: Republicans Betty Jo Nelsen (10th District) and Donald K. Stitt (60th District) were sworn in to replace Rod Johnston and David W. Opitz, respectively.)	60	39	99	0
From Jan. 26, 1980 (Note: Democrat James W. Wahner (15th District) resigned.)	59	39	98	1
From Apr. 29, 1980 (Note: Democrat Lois Plous (15th District) was sworn in to replace James W. Wahner.)	60	39	99	0
From Dec. 8, 1980 (Note: Republican Harry G. Snyder (84th District) resigned after he was appointed a Wisconsin circuit court judge.)	60	38	98	1
Final voting share	60.61%	39.39%		
Beginning of the next Legislature	59	39	98	1

== Sessions ==
- Regular session: January 3, 1979 – January 5, 1981
- September 1979 special session: September 5, 1979
- January 1980 special session: January 22, 1980 – January 25, 1980
- June 1980 special session: June 3, 1980 – July 3, 1980

== Leaders ==
=== Senate leadership ===
- President of the Senate: Russell Olson (R) (until May 1, 1979)
  - Fred Risser (D–Madison) (after May 1, 1979)
- President pro tempore: Fred Risser (D–Madison) (until May 1, 1979)

==== Senate majority leadership ====
- Majority Leader: William A. Bablitch (D–Stevens Point)
- Assistant Majority Leader: James T. Flynn (D–West Allis)

==== Senate minority leadership ====
- Minority Leader: Clifford Krueger (R–Merrill)
- Assistant Minority Leader: Roger P. Murphy (R–Waukesha) (until Feb. 28, 1980)

=== Assembly leadership ===
- Speaker of the Assembly: Edward Jackamonis (D–Waukesha)
- Speaker pro tempore: David Kedrowski (D–Washburn)

==== Assembly majority leadership ====
- Majority Leader: James W. Wahner (D–Milwaukee) (until Jan. 26, 1980)
  - Gary K. Johnson (after Jan. 26, 1980)
- Assistant Majority Leader: R. Michael Ferrall (D–Racine)

==== Assembly minority leadership ====
- Minority Leader: John C. Shabaz (R–New Berlin)
- Assistant Minority Leader: Tommy Thompson (R–Elroy)

== Members ==
=== Members of the Senate ===
Members of the Senate for the Eighty-Fourth Wisconsin Legislature:

Senate partisan representation Democratic: 21 seats Republican: 12 seats

Dist.	Senator	Party	Age (1979)	Home	First elected
01	Alan Lasee	Rep.	41	De Pere, Brown County	1977
02	Tom Petri (res. Apr. 3, 1979)	Rep.	38	Green Bay, Brown County	1972
02	Don Hanaway (from Jul. 11, 1979)	Rep.	45	De Pere, Brown County	1979
03	Jerry Kleczka	Dem.	35	Milwaukee, Milwaukee County	1974
04	--Vacant until Apr. 17, 1979--				
04	Rod Johnston (from Apr. 17, 1979)	Rep.	41	Whitefish Bay, Milwaukee County	1979
05	David Berger	Dem.	32	Milwaukee, Milwaukee County	1974
06	Monroe Swan (rem. Oct. 22, 1980)	Dem.	41	Milwaukee, Milwaukee County	1972
07	Kurt Frank	Dem.	33	Milwaukee, Milwaukee County	1970
08	James T. Flynn	Dem.	34	West Allis, Milwaukee County	1972
09	Jim Moody	Dem.	43	Milwaukee, Milwaukee County	1978
10	Michele Radosevich	Dem.	31	North Hudson, St. Croix County	1976
11	Warren Braun	Dem.	44	Milwaukee, Milwaukee County	1976
12	Clifford Krueger	Rep.	60	Merrill, Lincoln County	1946
13	Peter D. Bear (res. Oct. 1, 1980)	Dem.	26	Madison, Dane County	1978
14	Gerald Lorge	Rep.	56	Bear Creek, Outagamie County	1954
15	Timothy Cullen	Dem.	34	Janesville, Rock County	1974
16	Carl W. Thompson	Dem.	64	Stoughton, Dane County	1959
17	Richard Kreul	Rep.	54	Fennimore, Grant County	1978
18	Scott McCallum	Rep.	28	Fond du Lac, Fond du Lac County	1976
19	Gary Goyke	Dem.	31	Oshkosh, Winnebago County	1974
20	--Vacant until Apr. 17, 1979--				
20	David W. Opitz (from Apr. 17, 1979)	Rep.	33	Port Washington, Ozaukee County	1979
21	Joseph A. Strohl	Dem.	32	Racine, Racine County	1978
22	John J. Maurer	Dem.	56	Kenosha, Kenosha County	1975
23	Marvin J. Roshell	Dem.	46	Lafayette, Chippewa County	1978
24	William A. Bablitch	Dem.	37	Stevens Point, Portage County	1972
25	Daniel Theno	Rep.	31	Ashland, Ashland County	1972
26	Fred Risser	Dem.	51	Madison, Dane County	1962
27	Everett Bidwell	Rep.	79	Portage, Columbia County	1970
28	Lynn Adelman	Dem.	39	New Berlin, Waukesha County	1976
29	Walter Chilsen	Rep.	55	Wausau, Marathon County	1966
30	Jerome Van Sistine	Dem.	52	Green Bay, Brown County	1976
31	Thomas Harnisch	Dem.	31	Neillsville, Clark County	1974
32	Paul Offner	Dem.	36	La Crosse, La Crosse County	1968
33	Roger P. Murphy (res. Feb. 28, 1980)	Rep.	55	Waukesha, Waukesha County	1970
33	Susan Engeleiter (from May 6, 1980)	Rep.	28	Brookfield, Waukesha County	1980

=== Members of the Assembly ===
Members of the Assembly for the Eighty-Fourth Wisconsin Legislature:

Assembly partisan representation Democratic: 60 seats Republican: 39 seats

Senate Dist.	Dist.	Representative	Party	Age (1979)	Home	First Elected
01	01	Lary J. Swoboda	Dem.	39	Luxemburg	1970
01	02	Francis J. Lallensack	Dem.	62	Manitowoc	1972
01	03	Daniel Fischer	Dem.	26	Reedsville	1976
02	04	Gary T. Dilweg	Rep.	41	De Pere	1978
02	05	William J. Rogers	Dem.	48	Kaukauna	1962
02	06	Gervase Hephner	Dem.	42	Chilton	1966
03	07	Kevin Soucie	Dem.	24	Milwaukee	1974
03	08	John Norquist	Dem.	29	Milwaukee	1974
03	09	Phillip Tuczynski	Dem.	31	Milwaukee	1974
04	10	Rod Johnston (res. Apr. 17, 1979)	Rep.	41	Whitefish Bay	1975
04	10	Betty Jo Nelsen (from Jul. 24, 1979)	Rep.	43	Shorewood	1979
04	11	Gus Menos	Dem.	58	Milwaukee	1971
04	12	John L. Merkt	Rep.	32	Mequon	1976
05	13	Michael G. Kirby	Dem.	26	Milwaukee	1974
05	14	Robert E. Behnke	Dem.	46	Milwaukee	1972
05	15	James W. Wahner (res. Jan. 26, 1980)	Dem.	39	Milwaukee	1970
05	15	Lois Plous (from Apr. 29, 1980)	Dem.	41	Milwaukee	1980
06	16	William B. Broydrick	Dem.	30	Milwaukee	1978
06	17	Walter L. Ward Jr.	Dem.	35	Milwaukee	1972
06	18	Marcia P. Coggs	Dem.	50	Milwaukee	1976
07	19	Louise M. Tesmer	Dem.	36	Milwaukee	1972
07	20	John Plewa	Dem.	33	Milwaukee	1972
07	21	Chester A. Gerlach	Dem.	31	South Milwaukee	1974
08	22	George Klicka	Rep.	44	Wauwatosa	1966
08	23	Thomas A. Hauke	Dem.	40	West Allis	1972
08	24	Gary J. Barczak	Dem.	39	West Allis	1972
09	25	Barbara Ulichny	Dem.	31	Milwaukee	1978
09	26	Stephen R. Leopold	Dem.	34	Milwaukee	1976
09	27	Joseph Czerwinski	Dem.	34	Milwaukee	1968
10	28	David E. Paulson	Rep.	47	Amery	1978
10	29	Robert W. Harer	Rep.	37	Woodville	1978
10	30	James Harsdorf	Rep.	28	River Falls	1977
11	31	Mordecai Lee	Dem.	30	Milwaukee	1976
11	32	Dismas Becker	Dem.	42	Milwaukee	1977
11	33	Richard E. Pabst	Dem.	45	Milwaukee	1966
12	34	Robert J. Larson	Rep.	46	Medford	1978
12	35	Sheehan Donoghue	Rep.	35	Merrill	1972
12	36	Lloyd H. Kincaid	Dem.	53	Crandon	1972
13	37	David Travis	Dem.	30	Madison	1978
13	38	Harland E. Everson	Dem.	61	Edgerton	1970
13	39	Milton Lorman	Rep.	51	Fort Atkinson	1976
14	40	Francis R. Byers	Rep.	58	Marion	1968
14	41	Ervin Conradt	Rep.	62	Shiocton	1964
14	42	David Prosser Jr.	Rep.	36	Appleton	1978
15	43	Cloyd A. Porter	Rep.	43	Burlington	1972
15	44	Delmar DeLong	Rep.	47	Janesville	1972
15	45	Gary K. Johnson	Dem.	39	Beloit	1970
16	46	Thomas A. Loftus	Dem.	33	Sun Prairie	1976
16	47	Jonathan B. Barry	Dem.	33	Primrose	1976
16	48	Wayne W. Wood	Dem.	48	Janesville	1976
17	49	Robert S. Travis Jr.	Rep.	31	Platteville	1976
17	50	Joanne M. Duren	Dem.	47	Cazenovia	1970
17	51	Joseph E. Tregoning	Rep.	37	Shullsburg	1967
18	52	Earl F. McEssy	Rep.	65	Fond du Lac	1956
18	53	James R. Lewis	Rep.	42	West Bend	1972
18	54	Esther Doughty Luckhardt	Rep.	65	Horicon	1962
19	55	Michael G. Ellis	Rep.	36	Neenah	1970
19	56	Richard A. Flintrop	Dem.	33	Oshkosh	1972
19	57	Gordon R. Bradley	Rep.	57	Oshkosh	1968
20	58	Carl Otte	Dem.	55	Sheboygan	1967
20	59	Calvin Potter	Dem.	33	Kohler	1974
20	60	David W. Opitz (res. Apr. 17, 1979)	Rep.	33	Port Washington	1972
20	60	Donald K. Stitt (from Jul. 24, 1979)	Rep.	34	Port Washington	1979
21	61	James F. Rooney	Dem.	43	Racine	1972
21	62	R. Michael Ferrall	Dem.	42	Racine	1970
21	63	E. James Ladwig	Rep.	40	Caledonia	1978
22	64	Joseph F. Andrea	Dem.	51	Kenosha	1976
22	65	Eugene Dorff	Dem.	48	Kenosha	1970
22	66	Mary Wagner	Dem.	29	Salem	1978
23	67	David R. Hopkins	Rep.	40	Eagle Point	1978
23	68	William P. Gagin	Rep.	62	Eau Claire	1968
23	69	Richard Shoemaker	Dem.	27	Menomonie	1978
24	70	Donald W. Hasenohrl	Dem.	43	Pittsville	1974
24	71	David Helbach	Dem.	30	Stevens Point	1978
24	72	Patricia A. Goodrich	Rep.	45	Berlin	1974
25	73	Thomas B. Murray	Dem.	40	Superior	1972
25	74	David Kedrowski	Dem.	36	Washburn	1972
25	75	Patricia Spafford Smith	Dem.	53	Rice Lake	1978
26	76	Mary Lou Munts	Dem.	54	Madison	1972
26	77	Midge Miller	Dem.	56	Madison	1970
26	78	David Clarenbach	Dem.	25	Madison	1974
27	79	Tommy Thompson	Rep.	37	Elroy	1966
27	80	James F. Laatsch	Rep.	38	Arlington	1978
27	81	Randall J. Radtke	Rep.	27	Lake Mills	1978
28	82	James A. Rutkowski	Dem.	36	Hales Corners	1970
28	83	John C. Shabaz	Rep.	47	New Berlin	1964
28	84	Harry G. Snyder (res. Dec. 8, 1980)	Rep.	40	Oconomowoc	1974
29	85	Edward F. McClain	Dem.	43	Wausau	1974
29	86	Raymond Omernick	Rep.	55	Wittenburg	1978
29	87	Earl W. Schmidt	Rep.	42	Birnamwood	1974
30	88	Richard P. Matty	Rep.	46	Stephenson	1972
30	89	Cletus J. Vanderperren	Dem.	66	Pittsfield	1958
30	90	Sharon Metz	Dem.	44	Green Bay	1974
31	91	Steve Gunderson	Rep.	27	Osseo	1974
31	92	Robert Quackenbush	Rep.	55	Sparta	1970
31	93	Marlin Schneider	Dem.	36	Wisconsin Rapids	1970
32	94	Virgil Roberts	Dem.	56	Holmen	1970
32	95	John Medinger	Dem.	30	La Crosse	1976
32	96	Bernard Lewison	Rep.	76	Viroqua	1954
33	97	Ronald H. Lingren	Dem.	43	Menomonee Falls	1974
33	98	Edward Jackamonis	Dem.	39	Waukesha	1970
33	99	John M. Young	Rep.	52	Brookfield	1978

== Employees ==
=== Senate employees ===
- Chief Clerk: Donald J. Schneider
- Sergeant-at-Arms: Daniel B. Fields

=== Assembly employees ===
- Chief Clerk: Marcel Dandeneau
- Sergeant-at-Arms: Joseph E. Jones
