= 83rd Wisconsin Legislature =

Wisconsin legislative term for 1977–1978

←	82nd	84th	→
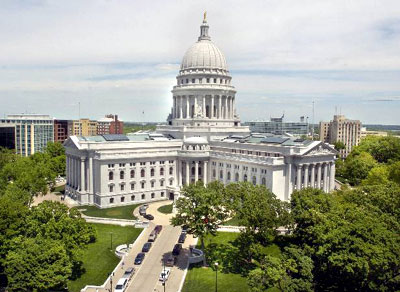
- Wisconsin State Capitol

Overview
- Legislative body: Wisconsin Legislature
- Meeting place: Wisconsin State Capitol
- Term: January 3, 1977 – January 1, 1979
- Election: November 2, 1976

Senate
- Members: 33
- Senate President: Martin J. Schreiber (D) ^{until July 6, 1977}
- President pro tempore: Fred Risser (D)
- Party control: Democratic

Assembly
- Members: 99
- Assembly Speaker: Edward Jackamonis (D)
- Speaker pro tempore: Michael P. Early (D)
- Party control: Democratic

Sessions
- Regular: January 3, 1977 – January 3, 1979

Special sessions
- Jun. 1977 Spec.: June 30, 1977 – June 30, 1977
- Nov. 1977 Spec.: November 7, 1977 – November 11, 1977
- Jun. 1978 Spec.: June 13, 1978 – June 15, 1978
- Dec. 1978 Spec.: December 20, 1978 – December 20, 1978

The Eighty-Third Wisconsin Legislature convened from January 3, 1977, to January 3, 1979, in regular session, and also convened in four special sessions.

This legislative session saw a dramatic overhaul of the Wisconsin judicial system as voters approved a series of amendments to the Constitution of Wisconsin which established the Wisconsin Court of Appeals and collapsed the county courts into the Wisconsin circuit court system. The amendment also established a constitutional basis for the powers of the Wisconsin Supreme Court to administer the state court system.

Senators representing even-numbered districts were newly elected for this session and were serving the first two years of a four-year term. Assembly members were elected to a two-year term. Assembly members and even-numbered senators were elected in the general election of November 2, 1976. Senators representing odd-numbered districts were serving the third and fourth year of a four-year term, having been elected in the general election of November 5, 1974.

The governor of Wisconsin for the first six months of this term was Democrat Patrick Lucey, of Crawford County, serving the third year of his second four-year term, having won re-election in the 1974 Wisconsin gubernatorial election. Lucey resigned on July 6, 1977, to accept appointment as United States Ambassador to Mexico. At that time, the lieutenant governor, Democrat Martin J. Schreiber, of Milwaukee County, then ascended to become governor for the remainder of this legislative term.

== Major events ==
- January 20, 1977: Inauguration of Jimmy Carter as 39th President of the United States.
- April 5, 1977: 1977 Wisconsin spring election:
  - William G. Callow was elected to the Wisconsin Supreme Court to succeed Robert W. Hansen.
  - Wisconsin voters ratified five amendments to the state constitution:
    - Allowing the legislature to authorize charitable raffle games as an exception to state gambling prohibitions.
    - Collapsing the county court system into the Wisconsin circuit courts.
    - Establishing the Wisconsin Court of Appeals.
    - Establishing disciplinary rules for the judiciary.
    - Repealing the mandatory retirement age for judges (70) and instead enabling the Legislature to set a mandatory retirement age. The legislature has never yet implemented such a law.
- July 3, 1977: About 20,000 members of the Wisconsin State Employee's Union started an illegal strike, paralyzing many state agencies and functions.
- July 6, 1977: Wisconsin governor Patrick Lucey resigned from office after he was confirmed by the United States Senate as Ambassador to Mexico. Lieutenant Governor Martin J. Schreiber immediately succeeded him as the 39th Governor of Wisconsin.
- July 21, 1977: The Wisconsin State Employee's Union strike came to an end after receiving concessions from the state government.
- August 4, 1977: U.S. President Jimmy Carter signed legislation creating the United States Department of Energy.
- January 24, 1978: The Great Blizzard of 1978 began, affecting all of the Great Lakes region.
- April 4, 1978: 1978 Wisconsin spring election:
  - John Louis Coffey was elected to the Wisconsin Supreme Court to succeed Leo B. Hanley.
  - Wisconsin voters rejected an amendment to the state constitution which would have allowed the Legislature to set up different forms of town government.
- August 6, 1978: Pope Paul VI died at Castel Gandolfo in Italy.
- August 26, 1978: The August 1978 papal conclave elected Cardinal-Priest Albino Luciani as the next pope, he then took the papal name Pope John Paul I.
- September 17, 1978: The Camp David Accords were signed between Israel and Egypt.
- September 28, 1978: Pope John Paul I died.
- October 16, 1978: The October 1978 papal conclave elected Cardinal-Priest Karol Józef Wojtyła as the next pope, he then took the papal name Pope John Paul II.
- November 7, 1978: 1978 United States general election:
  - Lee S. Dreyfus (R) elected Governor of Wisconsin.

== Major legislation ==
- June 29, 1977: An Act ... relating to state finances and appropriations, constituting the executive budget bill of the 1977 legislature, and making appropriations, 1977 Act 29. It was vetoed in part, but the vetoes were overridden. Established the office of secretary of the Department of Industry, Labor & Human Relations, making it a gubernatorial appointee. The Department of Agriculture was renamed the Wisconsin Department of Agriculture, Trade and Consumer Protection.

== Party summary ==
=== Senate summary ===
Senate partisan composition Democratic: 22 seats Republican: 11 seats

	Party (Shading indicates majority caucus)		Total	
	Dem.	Rep.	Total	Vacant
End of previous Legislature	18	14	32	1
Start of Reg. Session	23	10	33	0
From Jan. 29, 1977 (Note: Democrat Jerome Martin (1st District) died.)	22	10	32	1
From May 12, 1977 (Note: Republican Alan Lasee (1st District) was sworn in to replace Jerome Martin.)	22	11	33	0
Final voting share	66.67%	33.33%		
Beginning of the next Legislature	21	10	31	2

=== Assembly summary ===
Assembly partisan composition Democratic: 66 seats Republican: 33 seats

	Party (Shading indicates majority caucus)		Total	
	Dem.	Rep.	Total	Vacant
End of previous Legislature	63	36	99	0
Start of Reg. Session	66	33	99	0
From Jun. 27, 1977 (Note: Republican Lloyd H. Kincaid (36th District) switched his party affiliation to Democratic.)	67	32	99	0
From Jul. 25, 1977 (Note: Democrat Peter J. Tropman (32nd District) resigned.)	66	32	98	1
From Aug. 15, 1977 (Note: Democrat Michael P. Early (30th District) resigned after he was appointed secretary of the Wisconsin Department of Veterans Affairs.)	65	32	97	2
From Nov. 7, 1977 (Note: Republican James Harsdorf (30th District) and Democrat Dismas Becker (32nd District) were sworn in to replace Michael P. Early and Peter J. Tropman, respectively.)	66	33	99	0
From Nov. 14, 1977 (Note: Democrat Michael Elconin (16th District) resigned.)	65	33	98	1
From Jan. 24, 1978 (Note: Democrat William B. Broydrick (16th District) was sworn in to replace Michael Elconin.)	66	33	99	0
Final voting share	66.67%	33.33%		
Beginning of the next Legislature	60	39	99	0

== Sessions ==
- Regular session: January 3, 1977 – January 3, 1979
- June 1977 special session: June 30, 1977
- November 1977 special session: November 7, 1977 – November 11, 1977
- June 1978 special session: June 13, 1978 – June 15, 1978
- December 1978 special session: December 20, 1978

== Leaders ==
=== Senate leadership ===
- President of the Senate: Martin J. Schreiber (D) (until July 6, 1977)
- President pro tempore: Fred Risser (D–Madison)

==== Senate majority leadership ====
- Majority Leader: William A. Bablitch (D–Stevens Point)
- Assistant Majority Leader: Jerry Kleczka (D–Milwaukee)

==== Senate minority leadership ====
- Minority Leader: Clifford Krueger (R–Merrill)
- Assistant Minority Leader: Jim Sensenbrenner (R–Shorewood)

=== Assembly leadership ===
- Speaker of the Assembly: Edward Jackamonis (D–Waukesha)
- Speaker pro tempore: Michael P. Early (D–River Falls)

==== Assembly majority leadership ====
- Majority Leader: James W. Wahner (D–Milwaukee)
- Assistant Majority Leader: R. Michael Ferrall (D–Racine)

==== Assembly minority leadership ====
- Minority Leader: John C. Shabaz (R–New Berlin)
- Assistant Minority Leader: Tommy Thompson (R–Elroy)

== Members ==
=== Members of the Senate ===
Members of the Senate for the Eighty-Third Wisconsin Legislature:

Senate partisan representation Democratic: 23 seats Republican: 10 seats

Dist.	Senator	Party	Age (1977)	Home	First elected
01	Jerome Martin (died Jan. 27, 1977)	Dem.	68	Whitelaw, Manitowoc County	1970
01	Alan Lasee (from May 12, 1977)	Rep.	39	De Pere, Brown County	1977
02	Tom Petri	Rep.	36	Green Bay, Brown County	1972
03	Jerry Kleczka	Dem.	33	Milwaukee, Milwaukee County	1974
04	Jim Sensenbrenner	Rep.	33	Shorewood, Milwaukee County	1975
05	David Berger	Dem.	30	Milwaukee, Milwaukee County	1974
06	Monroe Swan	Dem.	39	Milwaukee, Milwaukee County	1972
07	Kurt Frank	Dem.	31	Milwaukee, Milwaukee County	1970
08	James T. Flynn	Dem.	32	West Allis, Milwaukee County	1972
09	Ronald G. Parys	Dem.	38	Milwaukee, Milwaukee County	1968
10	Michele Radosevich	Dem.	29	North Hudson, St. Croix County	1976
11	Warren Braun	Dem.	42	Milwaukee, Milwaukee County	1976
12	Clifford Krueger	Rep.	58	Merrill, Lincoln County	1946
13	Dale McKenna	Dem.	39	Jefferson, Jefferson County	1969
14	Gerald Lorge	Rep.	54	Bear Creek, Outagamie County	1954
15	Timothy Cullen	Dem.	32	Janesville, Rock County	1974
16	Carl W. Thompson	Dem.	62	Stoughton, Dane County	1959
17	Kathryn Morrison	Dem.	34	Platteville, Grant County	1974
18	Scott McCallum	Rep.	26	Fond du Lac, Fond du Lac County	1976
19	Gary Goyke	Dem.	29	Oshkosh, Winnebago County	1974
20	Ernest Keppler	Rep.	58	Sheboygan, Sheboygan County	1960
21	Henry Dorman	Dem.	60	Racine, Racine County	1965
22	John J. Maurer	Dem.	54	Kenosha, Kenosha County	1975
23	Bruce Peloquin	Dem.	40	Chippewa Falls, Chippewa County	1970
24	William A. Bablitch	Dem.	35	Stevens Point, Portage County	1972
25	Daniel Theno	Rep.	29	Ashland, Ashland County	1972
26	Fred Risser	Dem.	49	Madison, Dane County	1962
27	Everett Bidwell	Rep.	77	Portage, Columbia County	1970
28	Lynn Adelman	Dem.	37	New Berlin, Waukesha County	1976
29	Walter Chilsen	Rep.	53	Wausau, Marathon County	1966
30	Jerome Van Sistine	Dem.	50	Green Bay, Brown County	1976
31	Thomas Harnisch	Dem.	29	Neillsville, Clark County	1974
32	Paul Offner	Dem.	34	La Crosse, La Crosse County	1968
33	Roger P. Murphy	Rep.	53	Waukesha, Waukesha County	1970

=== Members of the Assembly ===
Members of the Assembly for the Eighty-Third Wisconsin Legislature:

Assembly partisan representation Democratic: 66 seats Republican: 33 seats

Senate Dist.	Dist.	Representative	Party	Age (1977)	Home	First Elected
01	01	Lary J. Swoboda	Dem.	37	Luxemburg	1970
01	02	Francis J. Lallensack	Dem.	60	Manitowoc	1972
01	03	Daniel Fischer	Dem.	24	Reedsville	1976
02	04	John C. Gower	Rep.	35	Green Bay	1972
02	05	William J. Rogers	Dem.	46	Kaukauna	1962
02	06	Gervase Hephner	Dem.	40	Chilton	1966
03	07	Kevin Soucie	Dem.	22	Milwaukee	1974
03	08	John Norquist	Dem.	27	Milwaukee	1974
03	09	Phillip Tuczynski	Dem.	29	Milwaukee	1974
04	10	Rod Johnston	Rep.	39	Fox Point	1975
04	11	Gus Menos	Dem.	56	Milwaukee	1971
04	12	John L. Merkt	Rep.	30	Mequon	1976
05	13	Michael G. Kirby	Dem.	24	Milwaukee	1974
05	14	Robert E. Behnke	Dem.	44	Milwaukee	1972
05	15	James W. Wahner	Dem.	37	Milwaukee	1970
06	16	Michael Elconin (res. Nov. 14, 1977)	Dem.	23	Milwaukee	1972
06	16	William B. Broydrick (from Jan. 24, 1978)	Dem.	29	Milwaukee	1978
06	17	Walter L. Ward Jr.	Dem.	33	Milwaukee	1972
06	18	Marcia P. Coggs	Dem.	48	Milwaukee	1976
07	19	Louise M. Tesmer	Dem.	34	Milwaukee	1972
07	20	John Plewa	Dem.	31	Milwaukee	1972
07	21	Chester A. Gerlach	Dem.	29	South Milwaukee	1974
08	22	George Klicka	Rep.	42	Wauwatosa	1966
08	23	Thomas A. Hauke	Dem.	38	West Allis	1972
08	24	Gary J. Barczak	Dem.	37	West Allis	1972
09	25	Jim Moody	Dem.	41	Milwaukee	1976
09	26	Stephen R. Leopold	Dem.	32	Milwaukee	1976
09	27	Joseph Czerwinski	Dem.	32	Milwaukee	1968
10	28	Harvey L. Dueholm	Dem.	66	Luck	1958
10	29	Leo Mohn	Dem.	51	Woodville	1970
10	30	Michael P. Early (res. Aug. 15, 1977)	Dem.	58	River Falls	1970
10	30	James Harsdorf (from Nov. 7, 1977)	Rep.	27	River Falls	1977
11	31	Mordecai Lee	Dem.	28	Milwaukee	1976
11	32	Peter J. Tropman (res. Jul. 25, 1977)	Dem.	32	Milwaukee	1972
11	32	Dismas Becker (from Nov. 7, 1977)	Dem.	41	Milwaukee	1977
11	33	Richard E. Pabst	Dem.	43	Milwaukee	1966
12	34	Stanley J. Lato	Dem.	52	Gilman	1974
12	35	Sheehan Donoghue	Rep.	33	Merrill	1972
12	36	Lloyd H. Kincaid	Rep.	51	Crandon	1972
12	36	Lloyd H. Kincaid	Dem.	51	Crandon	1972
13	37	Peter D. Bear	Dem.	24	Madison	1976
13	38	Harland E. Everson	Dem.	59	Edgerton	1970
13	39	Milton Lorman	Rep.	49	Fort Atkinson	1976
14	40	Francis R. Byers	Rep.	56	Marion	1968
14	41	Ervin Conradt	Rep.	60	Shiocton	1964
14	42	Toby Roth	Rep.	38	Appleton	1972
15	43	Cloyd A. Porter	Rep.	41	Burlington	1972
15	44	Delmar DeLong	Rep.	45	Janesville	1972
15	45	Gary K. Johnson	Dem.	37	Beloit	1970
16	46	Thomas A. Loftus	Dem.	31	Sun Prairie	1976
16	47	Jonathan B. Barry	Dem.	31	Primrose	1976
16	48	Wayne W. Wood	Dem.	46	Janesville	1976
17	49	Robert S. Travis Jr.	Rep.	29	Platteville	1976
17	50	Joanne M. Duren	Dem.	45	Cazenovia	1970
17	51	Joseph E. Tregoning	Rep.	35	Shullsburg	1967
18	52	Earl F. McEssy	Rep.	63	Fond du Lac	1956
18	53	James R. Lewis	Rep.	40	West Bend	1972
18	54	Esther Doughty Luckhardt	Rep.	63	Horicon	1962
19	55	Michael G. Ellis	Rep.	34	Neenah	1970
19	56	Richard A. Flintrop	Dem.	31	Oshkosh	1972
19	57	Gordon R. Bradley	Rep.	55	Oshkosh	1968
20	58	Carl Otte	Dem.	53	Sheboygan	1967
20	59	Calvin Potter	Dem.	31	Kohler	1974
20	60	David W. Opitz	Rep.	31	Saukville	1972
21	61	James F. Rooney	Dem.	41	Racine	1972
21	62	R. Michael Ferrall	Dem.	40	Racine	1970
21	63	Marcel Dandeneau	Dem.	45	Wind Point	1974
22	64	Joseph F. Andrea	Dem.	49	Kenosha	1976
22	65	Eugene Dorff	Dem.	46	Kenosha	1970
22	66	Russell Olson	Rep.	52	Randall	1960
23	67	Steven C. Brist	Dem.	22	Chippewa Falls	1976
23	68	Joseph Looby	Dem.	59	Eau Claire	1968
23	69	La Verne Ausman	Rep.	46	Elk Mound	1974
24	70	Donald W. Hasenohrl	Dem.	41	Pittsville	1974
24	71	Leonard A. Groshek	Dem.	63	Stevens Point	1966
24	72	Patricia A. Goodrich	Rep.	43	Berlin	1974
25	73	Thomas B. Murray	Dem.	38	Superior	1972
25	74	David Kedrowski	Dem.	34	Washburn	1972
25	75	Kenneth M. Schricker	Rep.	55	Spooner	1970
26	76	Mary Lou Munts	Dem.	52	Madison	1972
26	77	Midge Miller	Dem.	54	Madison	1970
26	78	David Clarenbach	Dem.	23	Madison	1974
27	79	Tommy Thompson	Rep.	35	Elroy	1966
27	80	Leroy Litscher	Dem.	54	Baraboo	1976
27	81	Thomas S. Hanson	Dem.	37	Beaver Dam	1974
28	82	James A. Rutkowski	Dem.	34	Hales Corners	1970
28	83	John C. Shabaz	Rep.	45	New Berlin	1964
28	84	Harry G. Snyder	Rep.	38	Oconomowoc	1974
29	85	Edward F. McClain	Dem.	41	Wausau	1974
29	86	Laurence J. Day	Dem.	63	Eland	1968
29	87	Earl W. Schmidt	Rep.	40	Shawano	1974
30	88	Richard P. Matty	Rep.	44	Crivitz	1972
30	89	Cletus J. Vanderperren	Dem.	64	Pittsfield	1958
30	90	Sharon Metz	Dem.	42	Green Bay	1974
31	91	Steve Gunderson	Rep.	25	Osseo	1974
31	92	Robert Quackenbush	Rep.	53	Sparta	1970
31	93	Marlin Schneider	Dem.	34	Wisconsin Rapids	1970
32	94	Virgil Roberts	Dem.	54	Holmen	1970
32	95	John Medinger	Dem.	28	La Crosse	1976
32	96	Bernard Lewison	Rep.	74	Viroqua	1954
33	97	Ronald H. Lingren	Dem.	41	Menomonee Falls	1974
33	98	Edward Jackamonis	Dem.	37	Waukesha	1970
33	99	Susan Shannon Engeleiter	Rep.	24	Brookfield	1974

== Employees ==
=== Senate employees ===
- Chief Clerk: Donald J. Schneider
- Sergeant-at-Arms: Robert M. Thompson

=== Assembly employees ===
- Chief Clerk: Everett E. Bolle
- Sergeant-at-Arms: Joseph E. Jones
