= 82nd Wisconsin Legislature =

Wisconsin legislative term for 1975–1976

| ← | 81st | 83rd | → |
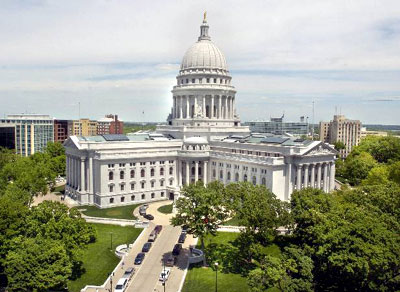
- Wisconsin State Capitol

Overview
- Legislative body: Wisconsin Legislature
- Meeting place: Wisconsin State Capitol
- Term: January 6, 1975 – January 3, 1977
- Election: November 5, 1974

Senate
- Members: 33
- Senate President: Martin J. Schreiber (D)
- President pro tempore: Fred Risser (D)
- Party control: Democratic

Assembly
- Members: 99
- Assembly Speaker: Norman C. Anderson (D)
- Speaker pro tempore: Edward Jackamonis (D)
- Party control: Democratic

Sessions
- Regular: January 6, 1975 – January 3, 1977

Special sessions
- Dec. 1975 Spec.: December 9, 1975 – December 11, 1975
- May 1976 Spec.: May 18, 1976 – May 18, 1976
- Jun. 1976 Spec.: June 15, 1976 – June 17, 1976
- Sep. 1976 Spec.: September 8, 1976 – September 8, 1976

The Eighty-Second Wisconsin Legislature convened from January 6, 1975, to January 3, 1977, in regular session, and also convened in four special sessions.

This was the first legislative term since 1893, when the Democratic Party of Wisconsin held the Governor's office and majorities in both chambers of the Legislature.

Senators representing odd-numbered districts were newly elected for this session and were serving the first two years of a four-year term. Assembly members were elected to a two-year term. Assembly members and odd-numbered senators were elected in the general election of November 5, 1974. Senators representing even-numbered districts were serving the third and fourth year of a four-year term, having been elected in the general election of November 7, 1972.

The governor of Wisconsin during this entire term was Democrat Patrick Lucey, of Crawford County, serving the first two years of his second four-year term, having won re-election in the 1974 Wisconsin gubernatorial election.

== Major events ==
- January 1, 1975: Former Attorney General of the United States John N. Mitchell was convicted of perjury for his part in the Watergate scandal. Former White House chief of staff H. R. Haldeman and former White House domestic affairs advisor John Ehrlichman were convicted on perjury, conspiracy, and obstruction charges.
- January 6, 1975: Second inauguration of Patrick Lucey as Governor of Wisconsin.
- April 1, 1975: 1975 Wisconsin Spring election:
  - Voters ratified two amendments to the state constitution:
    - Allowing the state to take on debt to make veterans' housing loans.
    - Repealing the section of the constitution which removed voting rights from any person found to have engaged in or facilitated a duel.
  - Voters also rejected two other amendments to the state constitution:
    - Would have allowed municipalities to bypass normal debt limits to pay for revenue-generating infrastructure.
    - Would have allowed the state to take on debt to fund transportation infrastructure (beyond the existing allowances for highways and port facilities). This referendum was later ruled invalid and ordered to be rerun.
- April 30, 1975: Saigon was captured by forces of the People's Army of Vietnam, effectively ending the Vietnam War.
- November 15, 1975: The 1st G6 summit was held at Rambouillet, France.
- April 6, 1976: 1976 Wisconsin Spring election:
  - Georgia Governor Jimmy Carter won the 1976 Wisconsin Democratic presidential primary.
  - Wisconsin voters rejected an amendment to the state constitution which would have raised the limit on municipal indebtedness.
- May 11, 1976: U.S. President Gerald Ford signed the Federal Election Campaign Act into law.
- May 23, 1976: Wisconsin Supreme Court chief justice Horace W. Wilkie died. Justice Bruce F. Beilfuss became the 22nd chief justice of the Wisconsin Supreme Court due to the rule of seniority.
- September 7, 1976: Wisconsin Governor Patrick Lucey appointed Shirley Abrahamson to the Wisconsin Supreme Court, to succeed Horace W. Wilkie. She was the first female justice of the Wisconsin Supreme Court.
- November 2, 1976: 1976 United States general election:
  - Jimmy Carter (D) elected President of the United States.
  - William Proxmire (D) re-elected United States senator from Wisconsin.
  - Wisconsin voters again rejected the amendment to the state constitution which would have allowed state to take on debt to fund transportation infrastructure.

== Major legislation ==
- July 30, 1975: An Act ... relating to state finances and appropriations constituting the executive budget bill of the' 1975 legislature, and making appropriations, 1975 Act 39. It was vetoed in part, but the vetoes were overridden. Established the office of secretary of the Department of Health and Social Services, making it a gubernatorial appointee.
- 1975 Joint Resolution 13: First legislative passage of a proposed a series of amendments to the state constitution to overhaul the state judiciary, establishing a court of appeals, collapsing the county courts into the circuit courts, and establishing the administrative powers of the supreme court over the subordinate state courts. These amendments were eventually ratified at the April 1977 election.

== Party summary ==
=== Senate summary ===
Senate partisan composition Democratic: 19 seats Republican: 14 seats

| | Party (Shading indicates majority caucus) | | Total | |
| | Dem. | Rep. | Total | Vacant |
|---|---|---|---|---|
| End of previous Legislature | 14 | 18 | 32 | 1 |
| Start of Reg. Session (Note: Republican Bob Kasten (4th District) and Democrat Doug La Follette (22nd District) resigned before the start of the session due to election to other offices.) | 18 | 13 | 31 | 2 |
| From Apr. 8, 1975 (Note: Republican Jim Sensenbrenner (4th District) and Democrat John J. Maurer (22nd District) were sworn in to replace Bob Kasten and Doug La Follette, respectively.) | 19 | 14 | 33 | 0 |
| From Apr. 30, 1976 (Note: Democrat Wayne F. Whittow (11th District) resigned after being elected Milwaukee city treasurer.) | 18 | 14 | 32 | 1 |
| From Dec. 8, 1976 (Note: Democrat Warren Braun (11th District) was sworn in to replace Wayne F. Whittow.) | 19 | 14 | 33 | 0 |
| Final voting share | 57.58% | 42.42% | | |
| Beginning of the next Legislature | 23 | 10 | 33 | 0 |

=== Assembly summary ===
Assembly partisan composition Democratic: 63 seats Republican: 36 seats

| | Party (Shading indicates majority caucus) | | Total | |
| | Dem. | Rep. | Total | Vacant |
|---|---|---|---|---|
| End of previous Legislature | 62 | 37 | 99 | 0 |
| Start of Reg. Session | 63 | 36 | 99 | 0 |
| From Apr. 8, 1975 (Note: Republican Jim Sensenbrenner (10th District) resigned after election to the state senate.) | 63 | 35 | 98 | 1 |
| From Sep. 2, 1975 (Note: Republican Rod Johnston (10th District) was sworn in to replace Jim Sensenbrenner.) | 63 | 36 | 99 | 0 |
| Final voting share | 63.64% | 36.36% | | |
| Beginning of the next Legislature | 66 | 33 | 99 | 0 |

== Sessions ==
- Regular session: January 6, 1975 – January 3, 1977
- December 1975 special session: December 9, 1975 – December 11, 1975
- May 1976 special session: May 18, 1976
- June 1976 special session: June 15, 1976 – June 17, 1976
- September 1976 special session: September 8, 1976

== Leaders ==
=== Senate leadership ===
- President of the Senate: Martin J. Schreiber (D)
- President pro tempore: Fred Risser (D–Madison)
- Majority leader: Wayne F. Whittow (D–Milwaukee) (res. Apr. 30, 1976)
  - William A. Bablitch (D–Stevens Point) (from May 17, 1976)
- Minority leader: Clifford Krueger (R–Merrill)

=== Assembly leadership ===
- Speaker of the Assembly: Norman C. Anderson (D–Madison)
- Speaker pro tempore: Edward Jackamonis (D–Waukesha)
- Majority leader: Terry A. Willkom (D–Chippewa Falls)
- Minority leader: John C. Shabaz (R–New Berlin)

== Members ==
=== Members of the Senate ===
Members of the Senate for the Eighty-Second Wisconsin Legislature:

Senate partisan representation Democratic: 19 seats Republican: 14 seats

| Dist. | Senator | Party | Age (1975) | Home | First elected |
|---|---|---|---|---|---|
| 01 | Jerome Martin | Dem. | 66 | Whitelaw, Manitowoc County | 1970 |
| 02 | Tom Petri | Rep. | 34 | Green Bay, Brown County | 1972 |
| 03 | Jerry Kleczka | Dem. | 31 | Milwaukee, Milwaukee County | 1974 |
| 04 | --Vacant until Apr. 8, 1975-- | | | | |
| 04 | Jim Sensenbrenner (from Apr. 8, 1975) | Rep. | 31 | Shorewood, Milwaukee County | 1975 |
| 05 | David Berger | Dem. | 28 | Milwaukee, Milwaukee County | 1974 |
| 06 | Monroe Swan | Dem. | 37 | Milwaukee, Milwaukee County | 1972 |
| 07 | Kurt Frank | Dem. | 29 | Milwaukee, Milwaukee County | 1970 |
| 08 | James T. Flynn | Dem. | 30 | West Allis, Milwaukee County | 1972 |
| 09 | Ronald G. Parys | Dem. | 36 | Milwaukee, Milwaukee County | 1968 |
| 10 | Robert P. Knowles | Rep. | 58 | New Richmond, St. Croix County | 1954 |
| 11 | Wayne F. Whittow (res. Apr. 30, 1976) | Dem. | 41 | Milwaukee, Milwaukee County | 1968 |
| 11 | Warren Braun (from Dec. 8, 1976) | Dem. | 42 | Milwaukee, Milwaukee County | 1976 |
| 12 | Clifford Krueger | Rep. | 56 | Merrill, Lincoln County | 1946 |
| 13 | Dale McKenna | Dem. | 37 | Jefferson, Jefferson County | 1969 |
| 14 | Gerald Lorge | Rep. | 52 | Bear Creek, Outagamie County | 1954 |
| 15 | Timothy Cullen | Dem. | 30 | Janesville, Rock County | 1974 |
| 16 | Carl W. Thompson | Dem. | 60 | Stoughton, Dane County | 1959 |
| 17 | Kathryn Morrison | Dem. | 32 | Platteville, Grant County | 1974 |
| 18 | Walter G. Hollander | Rep. | 78 | Rosendale, Fond du Lac County | 1956 |
| 19 | Gary Goyke | Dem. | 27 | Oshkosh, Winnebago County | 1974 |
| 20 | Ernest Keppler | Rep. | 56 | Sheboygan, Sheboygan County | 1960 |
| 21 | Henry Dorman | Dem. | 58 | Racine, Racine County | 1965 |
| 22 | --Vacant until Apr. 8, 1975-- | | | | |
| 22 | John J. Maurer (from Apr. 8, 1975) | Dem. | 52 | Kenosha, Kenosha County | 1975 |
| 23 | Bruce Peloquin | Dem. | 38 | Chippewa Falls, Chippewa County | 1970 |
| 24 | William A. Bablitch | Dem. | 33 | Stevens Point, Portage County | 1972 |
| 25 | Daniel Theno | Rep. | 27 | Ashland, Ashland County | 1972 |
| 26 | Fred Risser | Dem. | 47 | Madison, Dane County | 1962 |
| 27 | Everett Bidwell | Rep. | 75 | Portage, Columbia County | 1970 |
| 28 | James C. Devitt | Rep. | 45 | Greenfield, Milwaukee County | 1968 |
| 29 | Walter Chilsen | Rep. | 51 | Wausau, Marathon County | 1966 |
| 30 | Reuben La Fave | Rep. | 59 | Oconto, Oconto County | 1956 |
| 31 | Thomas Harnisch | Dem. | 27 | Neillsville, Clark County | 1974 |
| 32 | Milo Knutson | Rep. | 56 | La Crosse, La Crosse County | 1968 |
| 33 | Roger P. Murphy | Rep. | 51 | Waukesha, Waukesha County | 1970 |

=== Members of the Assembly ===
Members of the Assembly for the Eighty-Second Wisconsin Legislature:

Assembly partisan representation Democratic: 63 seats Republican: 36 seats

| Senate Dist. | Dist. | Representative | Party | Age (1975) | Home | First Elected |
|---|---|---|---|---|---|---|
| 01 | 01 | Lary J. Swoboda | Dem. | 35 | Luxemburg | 1970 |
| 01 | 02 | Francis J. Lallensack | Dem. | 58 | Manitowoc | 1972 |
| 01 | 03 | Alan Lasee | Rep. | 43 | De Pere | 1974 |
| 02 | 04 | John C. Gower | Rep. | 33 | Green Bay | 1972 |
| 02 | 05 | William J. Rogers | Dem. | 44 | Kaukauna | 1962 |
| 02 | 06 | Gervase Hephner | Dem. | 38 | Chilton | 1966 |
| 03 | 07 | Kevin Soucie | Dem. | 20 | Milwaukee | 1974 |
| 03 | 08 | John Norquist | Dem. | 25 | Milwaukee | 1974 |
| 03 | 09 | Phillip Tuczynski | Dem. | 27 | Milwaukee | 1974 |
| 04 | 10 | Jim Sensenbrenner (until Apr. 8, 1975) | Rep. | 31 | Shorewood | 1968 |
| 04 | 10 | Rod Johnston (from Sep. 2, 1975) | Rep. | 38 | Fox Point | 1975 |
| 04 | 11 | Gus Menos | Dem. | 54 | Milwaukee | 1971 |
| 04 | 12 | Frederick C. Schroeder | Rep. | 64 | Milwaukee | 1964 |
| 05 | 13 | Michael G. Kirby | Dem. | 22 | Milwaukee | 1974 |
| 05 | 14 | Robert E. Behnke | Dem. | 42 | Milwaukee | 1972 |
| 05 | 15 | James W. Wahner | Dem. | 35 | Milwaukee | 1970 |
| 06 | 16 | Michael Elconin | Dem. | 21 | Milwaukee | 1972 |
| 06 | 17 | Walter L. Ward Jr. | Dem. | 31 | Milwaukee | 1972 |
| 06 | 18 | Lloyd Barbee | Dem. | 49 | Milwaukee | 1964 |
| 07 | 19 | Louise M. Tesmer | Dem. | 32 | St. Francis | 1972 |
| 07 | 20 | John Plewa | Dem. | 29 | Milwaukee | 1972 |
| 07 | 21 | Chester A. Gerlach | Dem. | 27 | South Milwaukee | 1974 |
| 08 | 22 | George Klicka | Rep. | 40 | Wauwatosa | 1966 |
| 08 | 23 | Thomas A. Hauke | Dem. | 36 | West Allis | 1972 |
| 08 | 24 | Gary J. Barczak | Dem. | 35 | West Allis | 1972 |
| 09 | 25 | Dennis Conta | Dem. | 34 | Milwaukee | 1968 |
| 09 | 26 | Harout O. Sanasarian | Dem. | 45 | Milwaukee | 1968 |
| 09 | 27 | Joseph Czerwinski | Dem. | 30 | Milwaukee | 1968 |
| 10 | 28 | Harvey L. Dueholm | Dem. | 64 | Luck | 1958 |
| 10 | 29 | Leo Mohn | Dem. | 49 | Woodville | 1970 |
| 10 | 30 | Michael P. Early | Dem. | 56 | River Falls | 1970 |
| 11 | 31 | Paul Sicula | Dem. | 35 | Milwaukee | 1966 |
| 11 | 32 | Peter J. Tropman | Dem. | 30 | Milwaukee | 1972 |
| 11 | 33 | Richard E. Pabst | Dem. | 41 | Milwaukee | 1966 |
| 12 | 34 | Stanley J. Lato | Dem. | 50 | Gilman | 1974 |
| 12 | 35 | Sheehan Donoghue | Rep. | 31 | Merrill | 1972 |
| 12 | 36 | Lloyd H. Kincaid | Rep. | 49 | Crandon | 1972 |
| 13 | 37 | Norman C. Anderson | Dem. | 46 | Madison | 1956 |
| 13 | 38 | Harland E. Everson | Dem. | 57 | Edgerton | 1970 |
| 13 | 39 | Byron F. Wackett | Rep. | 62 | Watertown | 1952 |
| 14 | 40 | Francis R. Byers | Rep. | 54 | Marion | 1968 |
| 14 | 41 | Ervin Conradt | Rep. | 58 | Shiocton | 1964 |
| 14 | 42 | Toby Roth | Rep. | 36 | Appleton | 1972 |
| 15 | 43 | Cloyd A. Porter | Rep. | 39 | Burlington | 1972 |
| 15 | 44 | Delmar DeLong | Rep. | 43 | Janesville | 1972 |
| 15 | 45 | Gary K. Johnson | Dem. | 35 | Beloit | 1970 |
| 16 | 46 | David D. O'Malley | Dem. | 62 | Waunakee | 1958 |
| 16 | 47 | Lyman F. Anderson | Rep. | 48 | Oregon | 1974 |
| 16 | 48 | Lewis T. Mittness | Dem. | 45 | Janesville | 1964 |
| 17 | 49 | James N. Azim Jr. | Rep. | 38 | Muscoda | 1964 |
| 17 | 50 | Joanne M. Duren | Dem. | 43 | Cazenovia | 1970 |
| 17 | 51 | Joseph E. Tregoning | Rep. | 33 | Shullsburg | 1967 |
| 18 | 52 | Earl F. McEssy | Rep. | 61 | Fond du Lac | 1956 |
| 18 | 53 | James R. Lewis | Rep. | 38 | West Bend | 1972 |
| 18 | 54 | Esther Doughty Luckhardt | Rep. | 61 | Horicon | 1962 |
| 19 | 55 | Michael G. Ellis | Rep. | 32 | Neenah | 1970 |
| 19 | 56 | Richard A. Flintrop | Dem. | 29 | Oshkosh | 1972 |
| 19 | 57 | Gordon R. Bradley | Rep. | 53 | Oshkosh | 1968 |
| 20 | 58 | Carl Otte | Dem. | 51 | Sheboygan | 1967 |
| 20 | 59 | Calvin Potter | Dem. | 29 | Kohler | 1974 |
| 20 | 60 | David W. Opitz | Rep. | 29 | Saukville | 1972 |
| 21 | 61 | James F. Rooney | Dem. | 39 | Racine | 1972 |
| 21 | 62 | R. Michael Ferrall | Dem. | 38 | Racine | 1970 |
| 21 | 63 | Marcel Dandeneau | Dem. | 43 | Wind Point | 1974 |
| 22 | 64 | George Molinaro | Dem. | 72 | Kenosha | 1946 |
| 22 | 65 | Eugene Dorff | Dem. | 44 | Kenosha | 1970 |
| 22 | 66 | Russell Olson | Rep. | 50 | Randall | 1960 |
| 23 | 67 | Terry A. Willkom | Dem. | 31 | Chippewa Falls | 1970 |
| 23 | 68 | Joseph Looby | Dem. | 57 | Eau Claire | 1968 |
| 23 | 69 | La Verne Ausman | Rep. | 44 | Elk Mound | 1974 |
| 24 | 70 | Donald W. Hasenohrl | Dem. | 39 | Pittsville | 1974 |
| 24 | 71 | Leonard A. Groshek | Dem. | 61 | Stevens Point | 1966 |
| 24 | 72 | Patricia A. Goodrich | Rep. | 41 | Berlin | 1974 |
| 25 | 73 | Thomas B. Murray | Dem. | 36 | Superior | 1972 |
| 25 | 74 | David Kedrowski | Dem. | 32 | Washburn | 1972 |
| 25 | 75 | Kenneth M. Schricker | Rep. | 53 | Spooner | 1970 |
| 26 | 76 | Mary Lou Munts | Dem. | 50 | Madison | 1972 |
| 26 | 77 | Midge Miller | Dem. | 52 | Madison | 1970 |
| 26 | 78 | David Clarenbach | Dem. | 21 | Madison | 1974 |
| 27 | 79 | Tommy Thompson | Rep. | 33 | Elroy | 1966 |
| 27 | 80 | Kenyon E. Giese | Rep. | 41 | Sauk City | 1970 |
| 27 | 81 | Thomas S. Hanson | Dem. | 35 | Beaver Dam | 1974 |
| 28 | 82 | James A. Rutkowski | Dem. | 32 | Hales Corners | 1970 |
| 28 | 83 | John C. Shabaz | Rep. | 43 | New Berlin | 1964 |
| 28 | 84 | Harry G. Snyder | Rep. | 36 | Oconomowoc | 1974 |
| 29 | 85 | Edward F. McClain | Dem. | 39 | Wausau | 1974 |
| 29 | 86 | Laurence J. Day | Dem. | 61 | Eland | 1968 |
| 29 | 87 | Earl W. Schmidt | Rep. | 38 | Shawano | 1974 |
| 30 | 88 | Richard P. Matty | Rep. | 42 | Crivitz | 1972 |
| 30 | 89 | Cletus J. Vanderperren | Dem. | 62 | Pittsfield | 1958 |
| 30 | 90 | Sharon Metz | Dem. | 40 | Green Bay | 1974 |
| 31 | 91 | Steve Gunderson | Rep. | 23 | Osseo | 1974 |
| 31 | 92 | Robert Quackenbush | Rep. | 51 | Sparta | 1970 |
| 31 | 93 | Marlin Schneider | Dem. | 32 | Wisconsin Rapids | 1970 |
| 32 | 94 | Virgil Roberts | Dem. | 52 | Holmen | 1970 |
| 32 | 95 | Paul Offner | Dem. | 32 | La Crosse | 1974 |
| 32 | 96 | Bernard Lewison | Rep. | 72 | Viroqua | 1954 |
| 33 | 97 | Ronald H. Lingren | Dem. | 39 | Menomonee Falls | 1974 |
| 33 | 98 | Edward Jackamonis | Dem. | 35 | Waukesha | 1970 |
| 33 | 99 | Susan J. Shannon | Rep. | 22 | Brookfield | 1974 |

== Employees ==
=== Senate employees ===
- Chief Clerk: Glenn E. Bultman
- Sergeant-at-Arms: Robert M. Thompson

=== Assembly employees ===
- Chief Clerk: Everett E. Bolle
- Sergeant-at-Arms: Raymond J. Tobiasz
