= 85th Wisconsin Legislature =

Wisconsin legislative term for 1981–1982

| ← | 84th | 86th | → |
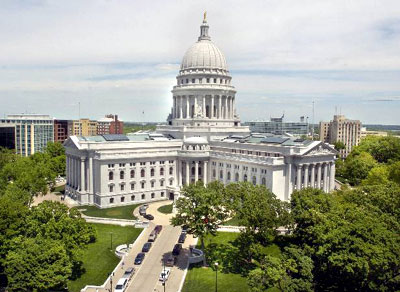
- Wisconsin State Capitol

Overview
- Legislative body: Wisconsin Legislature
- Meeting place: Wisconsin State Capitol
- Term: January 5, 1981 – January 3, 1983
- Election: November 4, 1980

Senate
- Members: 33
- Senate President: Fred Risser (D)
- Party control: Democratic

Assembly
- Members: 99
- Assembly Speaker: Edward Jackamonis (D)
- Deputy Speaker: Louise M. Tesmer (D)
- Party control: Democratic

Sessions
- Regular: January 5, 1981 – January 3, 1983

Special sessions
- Nov. 1981 Spec.: November 4, 1981 – November 17, 1981
- Apr. 1982 Spec.: April 6, 1982 – May 20, 1982
- May 1982 Spec.: May 26, 1982 – May 28, 1982

The Eighty-Fifth Wisconsin Legislature convened from January 5, 1981, to January 3, 1983, in regular session, and also convened in three special sessions.

This session represents the third time the Legislature failed to pass a redistricting act on schedule. Ultimately, a panel of federal judges would implement a punitive redistricting plan in 1982, and after Democrats gained unified control of government in 1983, they passed a superseding plan.

Senators representing even-numbered districts were newly elected for this session and were serving the first two years of a four-year term. Assembly members were elected to a two-year term. Assembly members and even-numbered senators were elected in the general election of November 4, 1980. Senators representing odd-numbered districts were serving the third and fourth year of a four-year term, having been elected in the general election of November 7, 1978.

The governor of Wisconsin during this entire term was Republican Lee S. Dreyfus, of Portage County, serving the second two years of a four-year term, having won election in the 1978 Wisconsin gubernatorial election.

== Major events ==
- January 20, 1981: Inauguration of Ronald Reagan as 40th President of the United States.
- March 30, 1981: U.S. President Ronald Reagan and three others were shot by John Hinckley Jr. in Washington, D.C.
- April 7, 1981: 1981 Wisconsin Spring election:
  - Wisconsin voters ratified five amendments to the state constitution:
    - Adding a provision for a recall primary when a nonpartisan official is recalled from office and more than two candidates seek the office.
    - Expanding debt options for municipal sewerage districts.
    - Amending the right to bail to allow the legislature to set additional circumstances where bail could be denied or revoked.
    - Updating conflicting language in the constitution relating to special corporations.
    - Removing a requirement for two-thirds vote on any changes to banking law.
- September 25, 1981: Sandra Day O'Connor became the first woman to serve on the United States Supreme Court.
- March 26, 1982: Wisconsin Supreme Court justice John Louis Coffey resigned from office after he was confirmed as a judge of the United States Court of Appeals for the Seventh Circuit.
- April 6, 1982: 1982 Wisconsin Spring election:
  - Wisconsin voters ratified an amendment to the state constitution allowing the Legislature to make counties financial liable for damages suffered by wrongful acts by sheriffs.
- April 15, 1982: Wisconsin governor Lee S. Dreyfus appointed Louis J. Ceci to the Wisconsin Supreme Court, to succeed John Louis Coffey.
- June 9, 1982: A three-judge panel of the United States District Court for the Eastern District of Wisconsin handed down their decision in the case of Wisconsin State AFL-CIO v. Elections Board, imposing new punitive legislative maps on Wisconsin.
- November 2, 1982: 1982 United States general election:
  - Tony Earl (D) elected Governor of Wisconsin.
  - William Proxmire (D) re-elected United States senator from Wisconsin.
  - Wisconsin voters ratified nine amendments to the state constitution:
    - Removing the words "man" and "men and "his" and "her" and replacing them with gender-neutral words.
    - Removing an exclusion on counting overseas soldiers and sailors from the language on redistricting.
    - Removing obsolete language left in the constitution by the 1881 term-lengths amendments.
    - Removing the requirement for a voice vote in the legislature for the election of their own officers.
    - Removing obsolete language left in the constitution by a 1902 amendment.
    - Removing obsolete language directing Civil War draft substitute payments to go into the state school fund.
    - Removing obsolete language dealing with the transition from the Wisconsin Territory into statehood in 1848.
    - Two amendments removing obsolete language left from the court transition amendments in 1977.

== Major legislation ==
- March 4, 1982: Joint Resolution ... relating to removal of obsolete provisions regarding transitions from territory to statehood, transitions in offices, legislative districting and elections, the school fund and masculine and feminine gender terminology, Enrolled Joint Resolution 29. This was the second legislative passage of a series of proposed amendments to the state constitution removing obsolete language from the constitution. These amendments were ratified by voters at the November 1982 election.

== Party summary ==
=== Senate summary ===
Senate partisan composition Democratic: 19 seats Republican: 14 seats

| | Party (Shading indicates majority caucus) | | Total | |
| | Dem. | Rep. | Total | Vacant |
|---|---|---|---|---|
| End of previous Legislature | 19 | 12 | 31 | 2 |
| Start of Reg. Session | 19 | 14 | 33 | 0 |
| Final voting share | 60.61% | 39.39% | | |
| Beginning of the next Legislature | 17 | 14 | 31 | 2 |

=== Assembly summary ===
Assembly partisan composition Democratic: 58 seats Republican: 40 seats Vacant: 1 seat

| | Party (Shading indicates majority caucus) | | Total | |
| | Dem. | Rep. | Total | Vacant |
|---|---|---|---|---|
| End of previous Legislature | 60 | 38 | 98 | 1 |
| Start of Reg. Session (Note: Republican Harry G. Snyder (84th District) resigned before the start of the session.) | 59 | 39 | 98 | 1 |
| From Apr. 15, 1981 (Note: Republican John M. Alberts (84th District) was sworn in to replace Harry G. Snyder.) | 59 | 40 | 99 | 0 |
| From Apr. 30, 1981 (Note: Democrat Jonathan B. Barry (47th District) resigned.) | 58 | 40 | 98 | 1 |
| From Nov. 1, 1981 (Note: Democrat William B. Broydrick (16th District) resigned.) | 57 | 40 | 97 | 2 |
| From Dec. 17, 1981 (Note: Republican John C. Shabaz (83rd District) resigned after he was confirmed as a United States district judge.) | 57 | 39 | 96 | 3 |
| From Jan. 15, 1982 (Note: Democrat Thomas W. Meaux (16th District) was sworn in to replace William B. Broydrick.) | 58 | 39 | 97 | 2 |
| From Apr. 14, 1982 (Note: Republican John C. Schober (83rd District) was sworn in to replace John C. Shabaz.) | 58 | 40 | 98 | 1 |
| From Jun. 25, 1982 (Note: Republican John T. Manske (47th District) was sworn in to replace Jonathan B. Barry.) | 58 | 41 | 99 | 0 |
| Final voting share | 58.59% | 41.41% | | |
| Beginning of the next Legislature | 59 | 40 | 99 | 0 |

== Sessions ==
- Regular session: January 5, 1981 – January 3, 1983
- November 1981 special session: November 4, 1981 – November 17, 1981
- April 1982 special session: April 6, 1982 – May 20, 1982
- May 1982 special session: May 26, 1982 – May 28, 1982

== Leaders ==
=== Senate leadership ===
- President of the Senate: Fred Risser (D–Madison)

==== Senate majority leadership ====
- Majority Leader: William A. Bablitch (D–Stevens Point) (until May 26, 1982)
  - Timothy Cullen (D–Janesville) (after May 26, 1982)
- Assistant Majority Leader: James T. Flynn (D–West Allis)

==== Senate minority leadership ====
- Minority Leader: Walter Chilsen (R–Wausau)
- Assistant Minority Leader: Don Hanaway (R–De Pere)

=== Assembly leadership ===
- Speaker of the Assembly: Edward Jackamonis (D–Waukesha)
- Deputy Speaker: Louise M. Tesmer (D–Milwaukee)

==== Assembly majority leadership ====
- Majority Leader: Thomas A. Loftus (D–Sun Prairie)
- Assistant Majority Leader: Chester A. Gerlach (D–South Milwaukee)

==== Assembly minority leadership ====
- Minority Leader: John C. Shabaz (R–New Berlin)
- Assistant Minority Leader: Tommy Thompson (R–Elroy)

== Members ==
=== Members of the Senate ===
Members of the Senate for the Eighty-Fifth Wisconsin Legislature:

Senate partisan representation Democratic: 19 seats Republican: 14 seats

| Dist. | Senator | Party | Age (1981) | Home | First elected |
|---|---|---|---|---|---|
| 01 | Alan Lasee | Rep. | 43 | De Pere, Brown County | 1977 |
| 02 | Don Hanaway | Rep. | 47 | De Pere, Brown County | 1979 |
| 03 | Jerry Kleczka | Dem. | 37 | Milwaukee, Milwaukee County | 1974 |
| 04 | Rod Johnston | Rep. | 43 | Whitefish Bay, Milwaukee County | 1979 |
| 05 | David Berger | Dem. | 34 | Milwaukee, Milwaukee County | 1974 |
| 06 | Gary George | Dem. | 26 | Milwaukee, Milwaukee County | 1980 |
| 07 | Kurt Frank | Dem. | 35 | Milwaukee, Milwaukee County | 1970 |
| 08 | James T. Flynn | Dem. | 36 | West Allis, Milwaukee County | 1972 |
| 09 | Jim Moody | Dem. | 45 | Milwaukee, Milwaukee County | 1978 |
| 10 | James Harsdorf | Rep. | 30 | River Falls, Pierce County | 1980 |
| 11 | Warren Braun | Dem. | 46 | Milwaukee, Milwaukee County | 1976 |
| 12 | Clifford Krueger | Rep. | 62 | Merrill, Lincoln County | 1946 |
| 13 | Barbara Lorman | Rep. | 48 | Fort Atkinson, Jefferson County | 1980 |
| 14 | Gerald Lorge | Rep. | 58 | Bear Creek, Outagamie County | 1954 |
| 15 | Timothy Cullen | Dem. | 36 | Janesville, Rock County | 1974 |
| 16 | Carl W. Thompson | Dem. | 66 | Stoughton, Dane County | 1959 |
| 17 | Richard Kreul | Rep. | 56 | Fennimore, Grant County | 1978 |
| 18 | Scott McCallum | Rep. | 30 | Fond du Lac, Fond du Lac County | 1976 |
| 19 | Gary Goyke | Dem. | 33 | Oshkosh, Winnebago County | 1974 |
| 20 | David W. Opitz | Rep. | 35 | Port Washington, Ozaukee County | 1979 |
| 21 | Joseph A. Strohl | Dem. | 34 | Racine, Racine County | 1978 |
| 22 | John J. Maurer | Dem. | 58 | Kenosha, Kenosha County | 1975 |
| 23 | Marvin J. Roshell | Dem. | 48 | Lafayette, Chippewa County | 1978 |
| 24 | William A. Bablitch | Dem. | 39 | Stevens Point, Portage County | 1972 |
| 25 | Daniel Theno | Rep. | 33 | Ashland, Ashland County | 1972 |
| 26 | Fred Risser | Dem. | 53 | Madison, Dane County | 1962 |
| 27 | Everett Bidwell | Rep. | 81 | Portage, Columbia County | 1970 |
| 28 | Lynn Adelman | Dem. | 41 | New Berlin, Waukesha County | 1976 |
| 29 | Walter Chilsen | Rep. | 57 | Wausau, Marathon County | 1966 |
| 30 | Jerome Van Sistine | Dem. | 54 | Green Bay, Brown County | 1976 |
| 31 | Thomas Harnisch | Dem. | 33 | Neillsville, Clark County | 1974 |
| 32 | Paul Offner | Dem. | 38 | La Crosse, La Crosse County | 1968 |
| 33 | Susan Engeleiter | Rep. | 28 | Brookfield, Waukesha County | 1980 |

=== Members of the Assembly ===
Members of the Assembly for the Eighty-Fifth Wisconsin Legislature:

Assembly partisan representation Democratic: 58 seats Republican: 40 seats Vacant: 1 seat

| Senate Dist. | Dist. | Representative | Party | Age (1981) | Home | First Elected |
|---|---|---|---|---|---|---|
| 01 | 01 | Lary J. Swoboda | Dem. | 41 | Luxemburg | 1970 |
| 01 | 02 | Vernon W. Holschbach | Dem. | 54 | Manitowoc | 1980 |
| 01 | 03 | Daniel Fischer | Dem. | 28 | Reedsville | 1976 |
| 02 | 04 | Gary T. Dilweg | Rep. | 43 | De Pere | 1978 |
| 02 | 05 | William J. Rogers | Dem. | 50 | Kaukauna | 1962 |
| 02 | 06 | Gervase Hephner | Dem. | 44 | Chilton | 1966 |
| 03 | 07 | Joseph Czarnezki | Dem. | 26 | Milwaukee | 1980 |
| 03 | 08 | John Norquist | Dem. | 31 | Milwaukee | 1974 |
| 03 | 09 | Phillip Tuczynski | Dem. | 33 | Milwaukee | 1974 |
| 04 | 10 | Betty Jo Nelsen | Rep. | 45 | Shorewood | 1979 |
| 04 | 11 | Gus Menos | Dem. | 60 | Milwaukee | 1971 |
| 04 | 12 | John L. Merkt | Rep. | 34 | Mequon | 1976 |
| 05 | 13 | Michael G. Kirby | Dem. | 28 | Milwaukee | 1974 |
| 05 | 14 | Robert E. Behnke | Dem. | 48 | Milwaukee | 1972 |
| 05 | 15 | Lois Plous | Dem. | 42 | Milwaukee | 1980 |
| 06 | 16 | William B. Broydrick (res. Nov. 1, 1981) | Dem. | 32 | Milwaukee | 1978 |
| 06 | 16 | Thomas W. Meaux (from Jan. 15, 1982) | Dem. | 27 | Milwaukee | 1982 |
| 06 | 17 | Annette Polly Williams | Dem. | 43 | Milwaukee | 1980 |
| 06 | 18 | Marcia P. Coggs | Dem. | 52 | Milwaukee | 1976 |
| 07 | 19 | Louise M. Tesmer | Dem. | 38 | Milwaukee | 1972 |
| 07 | 20 | John Plewa | Dem. | 35 | Milwaukee | 1972 |
| 07 | 21 | Chester A. Gerlach | Dem. | 33 | South Milwaukee | 1974 |
| 08 | 22 | George Klicka | Rep. | 46 | Wauwatosa | 1966 |
| 08 | 23 | Thomas A. Hauke | Dem. | 42 | West Allis | 1972 |
| 08 | 24 | Gary J. Barczak | Dem. | 41 | West Allis | 1972 |
| 09 | 25 | Barbara Ulichny | Dem. | 33 | Milwaukee | 1978 |
| 09 | 26 | Stephen R. Leopold | Dem. | 36 | Milwaukee | 1976 |
| 09 | 27 | Walter Kunicki | Dem. | 22 | Milwaukee | 1980 |
| 10 | 28 | David E. Paulson | Rep. | 49 | Amery | 1978 |
| 10 | 29 | Robert W. Harer | Rep. | 39 | Woodville | 1978 |
| 10 | 30 | Jule Berndt | Rep. | 56 | River Falls | 1980 |
| 11 | 31 | Mordecai Lee | Dem. | 32 | Milwaukee | 1976 |
| 11 | 32 | Dismas Becker | Dem. | 44 | Milwaukee | 1977 |
| 11 | 33 | Thomas J. Crawford | Dem. | 28 | Milwaukee | 1980 |
| 12 | 34 | Robert J. Larson | Rep. | 48 | Medford | 1978 |
| 12 | 35 | Sheehan Donoghue | Rep. | 37 | Merrill | 1972 |
| 12 | 36 | Lloyd H. Kincaid | Dem. | 55 | Crandon | 1972 |
| 13 | 37 | David Travis | Dem. | 32 | Madison | 1978 |
| 13 | 38 | Harland E. Everson | Dem. | 63 | Edgerton | 1970 |
| 13 | 39 | Randall S. Knox | Rep. | 31 | Jefferson | 1980 |
| 14 | 40 | Francis R. Byers | Rep. | 60 | Marion | 1968 |
| 14 | 41 | Ervin Conradt | Rep. | 64 | Shiocton | 1964 |
| 14 | 42 | David Prosser Jr. | Rep. | 38 | Appleton | 1978 |
| 15 | 43 | Cloyd A. Porter | Rep. | 45 | Burlington | 1972 |
| 15 | 44 | Delmar DeLong | Rep. | 49 | Janesville | 1972 |
| 15 | 45 | Gary K. Johnson | Dem. | 41 | Beloit | 1970 |
| 16 | 46 | Thomas A. Loftus | Dem. | 35 | Sun Prairie | 1976 |
| 16 | 47 | Jonathan B. Barry (res. Apr. 30, 1981) | Dem. | 35 | Primrose | 1976 |
| 16 | 47 | --Vacant from Apr. 30, 1981, to Jun. 25, 1982-- | | | | |
| 16 | 47 | John T. Manske (from Jun. 25, 1982) | Rep. | 29 | Milton | 1981 |
| 16 | 48 | Wayne W. Wood | Dem. | 50 | Janesville | 1976 |
| 17 | 49 | Robert S. Travis Jr. | Rep. | 33 | Platteville | 1976 |
| 17 | 50 | Joanne M. Duren | Dem. | 49 | Cazenovia | 1970 |
| 17 | 51 | Joseph E. Tregoning | Rep. | 39 | Shullsburg | 1967 |
| 18 | 52 | Earl F. McEssy | Rep. | 67 | Fond du Lac | 1956 |
| 18 | 53 | Mary Panzer | Rep. | 29 | Brownsville | 1980 |
| 18 | 54 | Esther Doughty Luckhardt | Rep. | 67 | Horicon | 1962 |
| 19 | 55 | Michael G. Ellis | Rep. | 38 | Neenah | 1970 |
| 19 | 56 | Richard A. Flintrop | Dem. | 35 | Oshkosh | 1972 |
| 19 | 57 | Gordon R. Bradley | Rep. | 59 | Oshkosh | 1968 |
| 20 | 58 | Carl Otte | Dem. | 57 | Sheboygan | 1967 |
| 20 | 59 | Calvin Potter | Dem. | 35 | Kohler | 1974 |
| 20 | 60 | Donald K. Stitt | Rep. | 36 | Port Washington | 1979 |
| 21 | 61 | James F. Rooney | Dem. | 45 | Racine | 1972 |
| 21 | 62 | Jeffrey A. Neubauer | Dem. | 25 | Racine | 1980 |
| 21 | 63 | E. James Ladwig | Rep. | 42 | Caledonia | 1978 |
| 22 | 64 | Joseph F. Andrea | Dem. | 53 | Kenosha | 1976 |
| 22 | 65 | Eugene Dorff | Dem. | 50 | Kenosha | 1970 |
| 22 | 66 | Mary Wagner | Dem. | 31 | Salem | 1978 |
| 23 | 67 | David R. Hopkins | Rep. | 42 | Eagle Point | 1978 |
| 23 | 68 | Joseph Looby | Dem. | 63 | Eau Claire | 1968 |
| 23 | 69 | Richard Shoemaker | Dem. | 29 | Menomonie | 1978 |
| 24 | 70 | Donald W. Hasenohrl | Dem. | 45 | Pittsville | 1974 |
| 24 | 71 | David Helbach | Dem. | 32 | Stevens Point | 1978 |
| 24 | 72 | Patricia A. Goodrich | Rep. | 47 | Berlin | 1974 |
| 25 | 73 | Thomas B. Murray | Dem. | 42 | Superior | 1972 |
| 25 | 74 | June Jaronitzky | Rep. | 42 | Tripp | 1980 |
| 25 | 75 | Patricia Spafford Smith | Dem. | 55 | Rice Lake | 1978 |
| 26 | 76 | Mary Lou Munts | Dem. | 56 | Madison | 1972 |
| 26 | 77 | Midge Miller | Dem. | 58 | Madison | 1970 |
| 26 | 78 | David Clarenbach | Dem. | 27 | Madison | 1974 |
| 27 | 79 | Tommy Thompson | Rep. | 39 | Elroy | 1966 |
| 27 | 80 | James F. Laatsch | Rep. | 40 | Arlington | 1978 |
| 27 | 81 | Randall J. Radtke | Rep. | 29 | Lake Mills | 1978 |
| 28 | 82 | James A. Rutkowski | Dem. | 38 | Hales Corners | 1970 |
| 28 | 83 | John C. Shabaz (res. Dec. 17, 1981) | Rep. | 29 | New Berlin | 1964 |
| 28 | 83 | John C. Schober (from Apr. 14, 1982) | Rep. | 50 | New Berlin | 1982 |
| 28 | 84 | --Vacant until Apr. 15, 1981-- | | | | |
| 28 | 84 | John M. Alberts (from Apr. 15, 1981) | Rep. | 47 | Oconomowoc | 1981 |
| 29 | 85 | John H. Robinson | Dem. | 25 | Wausau | 1980 |
| 29 | 86 | John L. McEwen | Rep. | 52 | Schofield | 1980 |
| 29 | 87 | Earl W. Schmidt | Rep. | 44 | Birnamwood | 1974 |
| 30 | 88 | Richard P. Matty | Rep. | 48 | Stephenson | 1972 |
| 30 | 89 | Cletus J. Vanderperren | Dem. | 68 | Pittsfield | 1958 |
| 30 | 90 | Sharon Metz | Dem. | 46 | Green Bay | 1974 |
| 31 | 91 | Alan S. Robertson | Rep. | 39 | Blair | 1980 |
| 31 | 92 | Robert Quackenbush | Rep. | 57 | Sparta | 1970 |
| 31 | 93 | Marlin Schneider | Dem. | 38 | Wisconsin Rapids | 1970 |
| 32 | 94 | Virgil Roberts | Dem. | 58 | Holmen | 1970 |
| 32 | 95 | John Medinger | Dem. | 32 | La Crosse | 1976 |
| 32 | 96 | Bernard Lewison | Rep. | 78 | Viroqua | 1954 |
| 33 | 97 | Lolita Schneiders | Rep. | 49 | Menomonee Falls | 1980 |
| 33 | 98 | Edward Jackamonis | Dem. | 41 | Waukesha | 1970 |
| 33 | 99 | John M. Young | Rep. | 54 | Brookfield | 1978 |

== Employees ==
=== Senate employees ===
- Chief Clerk: Donald J. Schneider
- Sergeant-at-Arms: Daniel B. Fields

=== Assembly employees ===
- Chief Clerk: David Kedrowski
- Sergeant-at-Arms: Lewis T. Mittness
