= 81st Wisconsin Legislature =

Wisconsin legislative term for 1973–1974

←	80th	82nd	→
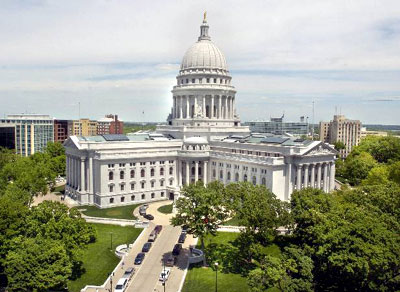
- Wisconsin State Capitol

Overview
- Legislative body: Wisconsin Legislature
- Meeting place: Wisconsin State Capitol
- Term: January 1, 1973 – January 6, 1975
- Election: November 7, 1972

Senate
- Members: 33
- Senate President: Martin J. Schreiber (D)
- President pro tempore: Robert P. Knowles (R)
- Party control: Republican

Assembly
- Members: 99
- Assembly Speaker: Norman C. Anderson (D)
- Speaker pro tempore: Joseph Sweda (D)
- Party control: Democratic

Sessions
- Regular: January 1, 1973 – January 6, 1975

Special sessions
- Dec. 1973 Spec.: December 17, 1973 – December 21, 1973
- Apr. 1974 Spec.: April 29, 1974 – June 13, 1974
- Nov. 1974 Spec.: November 19, 1974 – November 20, 1974

The Eighty-First Wisconsin Legislature convened from January 1, 1973, to January 6, 1975, in regular session, and also convened in three special sessions.

This was the first legislative session after the redistricting of the Senate and Assembly according to an act of the previous session. This was also the first legislative session under the current legislative configuration, with 99 members of the Assembly and 33 state senators, with each senate district comprising three assembly districts.

Senators representing even-numbered districts were newly elected for this session and were serving the first two years of a four-year term. Assembly members were elected to a two-year term. Assembly members and even-numbered senators were elected in the general election of November 7, 1972. Senators representing odd-numbered districts were serving the third and fourth year of a four-year term, having been elected in the general election of November 3, 1970.

The governor of Wisconsin during this entire term was Democrat Patrick Lucey, of Crawford County, serving the second two years of a four-year term, having won election in the 1970 Wisconsin gubernatorial election.

== Major events ==
- January 20, 1973: Second inauguration of Richard Nixon as President of the United States.
- January 27, 1973: The Paris Peace Accords were signed, ending the formal participation of the United States in the Vietnam War.
- October 10, 1973: U.S. Vice President Spiro Agnew pled no contest to a charge of felony tax evasion and resigned from office.
- December 6, 1973: Gerald Ford was sworn in as the 40th Vice President of the United States.
- August 1, 1974: Wisconsin Supreme Court chief justice E. Harold Hallows resigned. Justice Horace W. Wilkie became the 21st chief justice of the Wisconsin Supreme Court due to the rule of seniority.
- August 9, 1974: U.S. President Richard Nixon resigned from office in the midst of the Watergate scandal. Vice President Gerald Ford immediately succeeded him as the 38th President of the United States.
- November 5, 1974: 1974 United States general election:
  - Patrick Lucey (D) re-elected Governor of Wisconsin.
  - Gaylord Nelson (D) re-elected United States senator from Wisconsin.

== Major legislation ==
- August 4, 1973: An Act ... constituting the executive budget bill of the 1973 legislature, and making appropriations, 1973 Act 90. The 1973 budget, it also created the Wisconsin State Ethics Board.
- July 6, 1974: An Act ... relating to regulation of elections and campaign contributions and expenditures, providing penalties and making appropriations, 1973 Act 334. Created the Wisconsin State Elections Board.

== Party summary ==
=== Senate summary ===
Senate partisan composition Democratic: 15 seats Republican: 18 seats

	Party (Shading indicates majority caucus)		Total	
	Dem.	Rep.	Total	Vacant
End of previous Legislature	13	20	33	0
Start of Reg. Session	15	18	33	0
From Sep. 26, 1974 (Note: Democrat Casimir Kendziorski (3rd District) died.)	14	18	32	1
Final voting share	43.75%	56.25%		
Beginning of the next Legislature	18	13	31	2

=== Assembly summary ===
Assembly partisan composition Democratic: 62 seats Republican: 37 seats

	Party (Shading indicates majority caucus)		Total	
	Dem.	Rep.	Total	Vacant
End of previous Legislature	65	34	99	1
Start of Reg. Session	62	37	99	0
Final voting share	62.63%	37.37%		
Beginning of the next Legislature	63	36	99	0

== Sessions ==
- Regular session: January 1, 1973 – January 6, 1975
- December 1973 special session: December 17, 1973 – December 21, 1973
- April 1974 special session: April 29, 1974 – June 13, 1974
- November 1974 special session: November 19, 1974 – November 20, 1974

== Leaders ==
=== Senate leadership ===
- President of the Senate: Martin J. Schreiber (D)
- President pro tempore: Robert P. Knowles (R–New Richmond)
- Vice President of the Senate: Ernest Keppler (R–Sheboygan)
- Majority leader: Raymond C. Johnson (R–Eau Claire)
- Minority leader: Fred Risser (D–Madison)

=== Assembly leadership ===
- Speaker of the Assembly: Norman C. Anderson (D–Madison)
- Speaker pro tempore: Joseph Sweda (D–Lublin)
- Majority leader: Tony Earl (D–Wausau)
- Minority leader: John C. Shabaz (R–New Berlin)

== Members ==
=== Members of the Senate ===
Members of the Senate for the Eighty-First Wisconsin Legislature:

Senate partisan representation Democratic: 15 seats Republican: 18 seats

Dist.	Senator	Party	Age (1973)	Home	First elected
01	Jerome Martin	Dem.	64	Whitelaw, Manitowoc County	1970
02	Tom Petri	Rep.	32	Green Bay, Brown County	1972
03	Casimir Kendziorski (died Sep. 26, 1974)	Dem.	74	Milwaukee, Milwaukee County	1946
04	Robert Kasten	Rep.	30	Thiensville, Ozaukee County	1972
05	Wilfred Schuele	Dem.	66	Brookfield, Waukesha County	1964
06	Monroe Swan	Dem.	35	Milwaukee, Milwaukee County	1972
07	Kurt Frank	Dem.	27	Milwaukee, Milwaukee County	1970
08	James T. Flynn	Dem.	28	West Allis, Milwaukee County	1972
09	Ronald G. Parys	Dem.	34	Milwaukee, Milwaukee County	1968
10	Robert P. Knowles	Rep.	56	New Richmond, St. Croix County	1954
11	Wayne F. Whittow	Dem.	39	Milwaukee, Milwaukee County	1968
12	Clifford Krueger	Rep.	54	Merrill, Lincoln County	1946
13	Dale McKenna	Dem.	35	Jefferson, Jefferson County	1969
14	Gerald Lorge	Rep.	50	Bear Creek, Outagamie County	1954
15	James D. Swan	Rep.	69	Elkhorn, Walworth County	1967
16	Carl W. Thompson	Dem.	58	Stoughton, Dane County	1959
17	Gordon Roseleip	Rep.	60	Darlington, Lafayette County	1962
18	Walter G. Hollander	Rep.	76	Rosendale, Fond du Lac County	1956
19	Jack D. Steinhilber	Rep.	41	Oshkosh, Winnebago County	1970
20	Ernest Keppler	Rep.	54	Sheboygan, Sheboygan County	1960
21	Henry Dorman	Dem.	56	Racine, Racine County	1965
22	Doug La Follette	Dem.	32	Kenosha, Kenosha County	1972
23	Bruce Peloquin	Dem.	36	Chippewa Falls, Chippewa County	1970
24	William A. Bablitch	Dem.	31	Stevens Point, Portage County	1972
25	Daniel Theno	Rep.	25	Ashland, Ashland County	1972
26	Fred Risser	Dem.	45	Madison, Dane County	1962
27	Everett Bidwell	Rep.	73	Portage, Columbia County	1970
28	James C. Devitt	Rep.	43	Greenfield, Milwaukee County	1968
29	Walter Chilsen	Rep.	49	Wausau, Marathon County	1966
30	Reuben La Fave	Rep.	57	Oconto, Oconto County	1956
31	Raymond C. Johnson	Rep.	36	Eau Claire, Eau Claire County	1966
32	Milo Knutson	Rep.	54	La Crosse, La Crosse County	1968
33	Roger P. Murphy	Rep.	49	Waukesha, Waukesha County	1970

=== Members of the Assembly ===
Members of the Assembly for the Eighty-First Wisconsin Legislature:

Assembly partisan representation Democratic: 62 seats Republican: 37 seats

Senate Dist.	Dist.	Representative	Party	Age (1973)	Home	First Elected
01	01	Lary J. Swoboda	Dem.	33	Luxemburg	1970
01	02	Francis J. Lallensack	Dem.	56	Manitowoc	1972
01	03	Everett E. Bolle	Dem.	53	Francis Creek	1960
02	04	John C. Gower	Rep.	31	Green Bay	1972
02	05	William J. Rogers	Dem.	42	Kaukauna	1962
02	06	Gervase Hephner	Dem.	36	Chilton	1966
03	07	Raymond J. Tobiasz	Dem.	56	Milwaukee	1960
03	08	Earl Keegan Jr.	Dem.	51	Milwaukee	1972
03	09	Jerry Kleczka	Dem.	29	Milwaukee	1968
04	10	Jim Sensenbrenner	Rep.	29	Shorewood	1968
04	11	Gus Menos	Dem.	52	Milwaukee	1971
04	12	Frederick C. Schroeder	Rep.	62	Milwaukee	1964
05	13	David G. Berger	Dem.	26	Milwaukee	1970
05	14	Robert E. Behnke	Dem.	40	Milwaukee	1972
05	15	James W. Wahner	Dem.	33	Milwaukee	1970
06	16	Michael Elconin	Dem.	19	Milwaukee	1972
06	17	Walter L. Ward Jr.	Dem.	29	Milwaukee	1972
06	18	Lloyd Barbee	Dem.	47	Milwaukee	1964
07	19	Louise M. Tesmer	Dem.	30	St. Francis	1972
07	20	John Plewa	Dem.	27	Milwaukee	1972
07	21	William P. Atkinson	Dem.	71	South Milwaukee	1964
08	22	George Klicka	Rep.	38	Wauwatosa	1966
08	23	Thomas A. Hauke	Dem.	34	West Allis	1972
08	24	Gary J. Barczak	Dem.	33	West Allis	1972
09	25	Dennis Conta	Dem.	32	Milwaukee	1968
09	26	Harout O. Sanasarian	Dem.	43	Milwaukee	1968
09	27	Joseph Czerwinski	Dem.	28	Milwaukee	1968
10	28	Harvey L. Dueholm	Dem.	62	Luck	1958
10	29	Leo Mohn	Dem.	47	Woodville	1970
10	30	Michael P. Early	Dem.	54	River Falls	1970
11	31	Paul Sicula	Dem.	33	Milwaukee	1966
11	32	Peter J. Tropman	Dem.	28	Milwaukee	1972
11	33	Richard E. Pabst	Dem.	39	Milwaukee	1966
12	34	Joseph Sweda	Dem.	46	Lublin	1962
12	35	Sheehan Donoghue	Rep.	29	Merrill	1972
12	36	Lloyd H. Kincaid	Rep.	47	Crandon	1972
13	37	Norman C. Anderson	Dem.	44	Madison	1956
13	38	Harland E. Everson	Dem.	55	Edgerton	1970
13	39	Byron F. Wackett	Rep.	60	Watertown	1952
14	40	Francis R. Byers	Rep.	52	Marion	1968
14	41	Ervin Conradt	Rep.	56	Shiocton	1964
14	42	Toby Roth	Rep.	34	Appleton	1972
15	43	Cloyd A. Porter	Rep.	37	Burlington	1972
15	44	Delmar DeLong	Rep.	41	Janesville	1972
15	45	Gary K. Johnson	Dem.	33	Beloit	1970
16	46	David D. O'Malley	Dem.	60	Waunakee	1958
16	47	Janet Soergel Mielke	Dem.	35	Milton	1970
16	48	Lewis T. Mittness	Dem.	43	Janesville	1964
17	49	James N. Azim Jr.	Rep.	36	Muscoda	1964
17	50	Joanne M. Duren	Dem.	41	Cazenovia	1970
17	51	Joseph E. Tregoning	Rep.	31	Shullsburg	1967
18	52	Earl F. McEssy	Rep.	59	Fond du Lac	1956
18	53	James R. Lewis	Rep.	36	West Bend	1972
18	54	Esther Doughty Luckhardt	Rep.	59	Horicon	1962
19	55	Michael G. Ellis	Rep.	30	Neenah	1970
19	56	Richard A. Flintrop	Dem.	27	Oshkosh	1972
19	57	Gordon R. Bradley	Rep.	51	Oshkosh	1968
20	58	Carl Otte	Dem.	49	Sheboygan	1967
20	59	Bill B. Bruhy	Rep.	56	Plymouth	1972
20	60	David W. Opitz	Rep.	27	Saukville	1972
21	61	James F. Rooney	Dem.	37	Racine	1972
21	62	R. Michael Ferrall	Dem.	36	Racine	1970
21	63	Henry Rohner	Rep.	53	Mount Pleasant	1972
22	64	George Molinaro	Dem.	70	Kenosha	1946
22	65	Eugene Dorff	Dem.	42	Kenosha	1970
22	66	Russell Olson	Rep.	48	Randall	1960
23	67	Terry A. Willkom	Dem.	29	Chippewa Falls	1970
23	68	Joseph Looby	Dem.	55	Eau Claire	1968
23	69	Alvin Baldus	Dem.	46	Menomonie	1966
24	70	John Oestreicher	Dem.	36	Marshfield	1970
24	71	Leonard A. Groshek	Dem.	59	Stevens Point	1966
24	72	Jon P. Wilcox	Rep.	36	Wautoma	1968
25	73	Thomas B. Murray	Dem.	34	Superior	1972
25	74	David Kedrowski	Dem.	30	Washburn	1972
25	75	Kenneth M. Schricker	Rep.	51	Spooner	1970
26	76	Mary Lou Munts	Dem.	48	Madison	1972
26	77	Midge Miller	Dem.	50	Madison	1970
26	78	Edward Nager	Dem.	45	Madison	1962
27	79	Tommy Thompson	Rep.	31	Elroy	1966
27	80	Kenyon E. Giese	Rep.	39	Sauk City	1970
27	81	Mel J. Cyrak	Rep.	36	Lake Mills	1972
28	82	James A. Rutkowski	Dem.	30	Hales Corners	1970
28	83	John C. Shabaz	Rep.	41	New Berlin	1964
28	84	John M. Alberts	Rep.	39	Oconomowoc	1968
29	85	Tony Earl	Dem.	16	Wausau	1969
29	86	Laurence J. Day	Dem.	59	Eland	1968
29	87	Herbert J. Grover	Dem.	35	Shawano	1964
30	88	Richard P. Matty	Rep.	40	Crivitz	1972
30	89	Cletus J. Vanderperren	Dem.	60	Green Bay	1958
30	90	Jerome Quinn	Rep.	64	Green Bay	1954
31	91	Eugene Oberle	Dem.	43	Stanley	1970
31	92	Robert Quackenbush	Rep.	49	Sparta	1970
31	93	Marlin Schneider	Dem.	30	Wisconsin Rapids	1970
32	94	Virgil Roberts	Dem.	50	Holmen	1970
32	95	Lawrence R. Gibson	Rep.	60	La Crosse	1972
32	96	Bernard Lewison	Rep.	70	Viroqua	1954
33	97	John H. Niebler	Rep.	31	Menomonee Falls	1972
33	98	Edward Jackamonis	Dem.	33	Waukesha	1970
33	99	Kenneth Merkel	Rep.	46	Brookfield	1964

== Employees ==
=== Senate employees ===
- Chief Clerk: William P. Nugent
- Sergeant-at-Arms: Kenneth Nicholson

=== Assembly employees ===
- Chief Clerk: Thomas S. Hanson
- Sergeant-at-Arms: William F. Quick

== Changes from the 80th Legislature ==
New districts for the 81st Legislature were defined in 1971 Wisconsin Act 304, passed into law in the 80th Wisconsin Legislature. This was probably the most important redistricting in state history, as it established the current system of representation, ending the process of allocating Assembly districts by county and creating each Senate district as a combination of three whole Assembly districts.

=== Senate redistricting ===
==== Summary of Senate changes ====
- Every district saw its boundaries change.

==== Senate districts ====
Map after redistricting, changes highlighted. Territory which was moved to a new district

Dist.	80th Legislature	81st Legislature
1	Door, Kewaunee, Manitowoc counties	Door, Kewaunee, Manitowoc counties and parts of eastern Brown County
2	Brown (south & east), Calumet counties	Calumet County and parts of central Brown County, southwest Outagamie County, eastern Fond du Lac County, northwest Sheboygan County, and northern Washington County
3	Milwaukee County (city southwest)	Milwaukee County (city southwest)
4	Milwaukee County (north)	Northeast Milwaukee County and most of Washington County and part of southern Ozaukee County
5	Milwaukee County (city northwest)	Milwaukee County (northwest)
6	Milwaukee County (city north)	Milwaukee County (city north)
7	Milwaukee County (southeast)	Milwaukee County (southeast)
8	Milwaukee County (middle-west)	Milwaukee County (middle-west)
9	Milwaukee County (city center)	Milwaukee County (city center)
10	Buffalo, Burnett, Pepin, Pierce, Polk, St. Croix counties	Buffalo, Burnett, Pepin, Pierce, Polk, St. Croix counties and western Barron County and part of southwest Trempealeau County
11	Milwaukee County (city west)	Milwaukee County (city west)
12	Clark, Forest, Lincoln, Oneida, Taylor, Vilas counties	Florence, Forest, Lincoln, Oneida, Rusk, Taylor, Vilas counties and parts of northeast Clark County, southern Price County, western Oconto County, northern Marinette County, and most of Langlade County
13	Dodge (east half), Jefferson, Washington counties	Central and southern Jefferson County and eastern Dane County
14	Outagamie, Waupaca counties	Waupaca County and most of Outagamie County and parts of southern Shawano County
15	Rock (east half), Walworth counties	South and eastern Rock County and most of Walworth County and part of western Racine County
16	Dane (excluding Madison), Rock (west half) counties	Northern, western, and southern Dane County and northern Rock County
17	Grant, Green, Iowa, Lafayette, Richland counties	Green, Iowa, Lafayette, Richland counties and most of Grant County and parts of northwest Dane County and western Rock County
18	Dodge (west half), Fond du Lac counties	Most of Dodge County and parts of central Fond du Lac County and western Washington County
19	Winnebago County	Most of Winnebago County and part of northern Fond du Lac County
20	Ozaukee, Sheboygan counties	Most of Sheboygan County and most of Ozaukee County
21	Racine County (southeast)	Racine County (east)
22	Kenosha County	Kenosha County and parts of central Racine County and southeast Walworth County
23	Barron, Chippewa, Dunn, Washburn counties	Chippewa and Dunn counties and parts of western Eau Claire County and eastern Pepin County
24	Green Lake, Portage, Waushara, Wood counties	Green Lake and Portage counties and most of Waushara County and parts of northern Wood County, southern Marathon County, eastern Clark County, western Fond du Lac County, northwest Dodge County, and southwest Winnebago County
25	Ashland, Bayfield, Douglas, Iron, Price, Rusk, Sawyer counties	Ashland, Bayfield, Douglas, Iron, Sawyer, Washburn counties and eastern Barron County and northern Price County
26	Dane County (Madison)	Dane County (Madison)
27	Adams, Columbia, Juneau, Marquette, Sauk counties	Columbia, Marquette, Sauk counties and parts of southern Adams County, southern Juneau County, and western Dodge County
28	Milwaukee (southwest), Racine (most), Waukesha (south half) counties	Milwaukee (southwest) and most of Waukesha County and parts of eastern Jefferson County
29	Marathon, Menominee, Shawano counties	Menominee County and most of Marathon County and most of Shawano County and part of southern Langlade County
30	Brown (north & west), Florence, Langlade, Marinette, Oconto counties	Brown (north & west) and eastern Oconto County and southern Marinette County
31	Eau Claire, Jackson, Monroe, Trempealeau counties	Most of Eau Claire County, most of Jackson County, most of Monroe County, and most of Clark County, and northern Trempealeau County
32	Crawford, La Crosse, Vernon counties	Crawford, La Crosse, Vernon counties and parts of northwest Grant County, southwest Monroe County, southern Trempealeau County, and southeast Jackson County
33	Waukesha County (north half)	Waukesha County (northeast)

=== Assembly redistricting ===
==== Summary of Assembly changes ====
- 1 district was left unchanged (73—previously the Douglas County district).
- The Eau Claire–Chippewa Falls metro area was divided between four districts (67, 68, 69, 91) after previously being divided between three.
- The Green Bay metro area was divided between five districts (1, 3, 4, 5, 89) after previously being divided between three.
- The Madison metro area was divided between 7 districts (37, 38, 46, 47, 76, 77, 78) after previously being divided between five.
- The Racine–Kenosha metro area was divided between 6 districts (61, 62, 63, 64, 65, 66) after previously being divided between five.
- The Waukesha County suburbs of Milwaukee were divided between 6 districts (82, 83, 84, 97, 98, 99) after previously being divided between four.
- The size of Milwaukee County's delegation was roughly unchanged.
