= Jim Yeadon =

American politician who served on the Madison, Wisconsin, Common Council

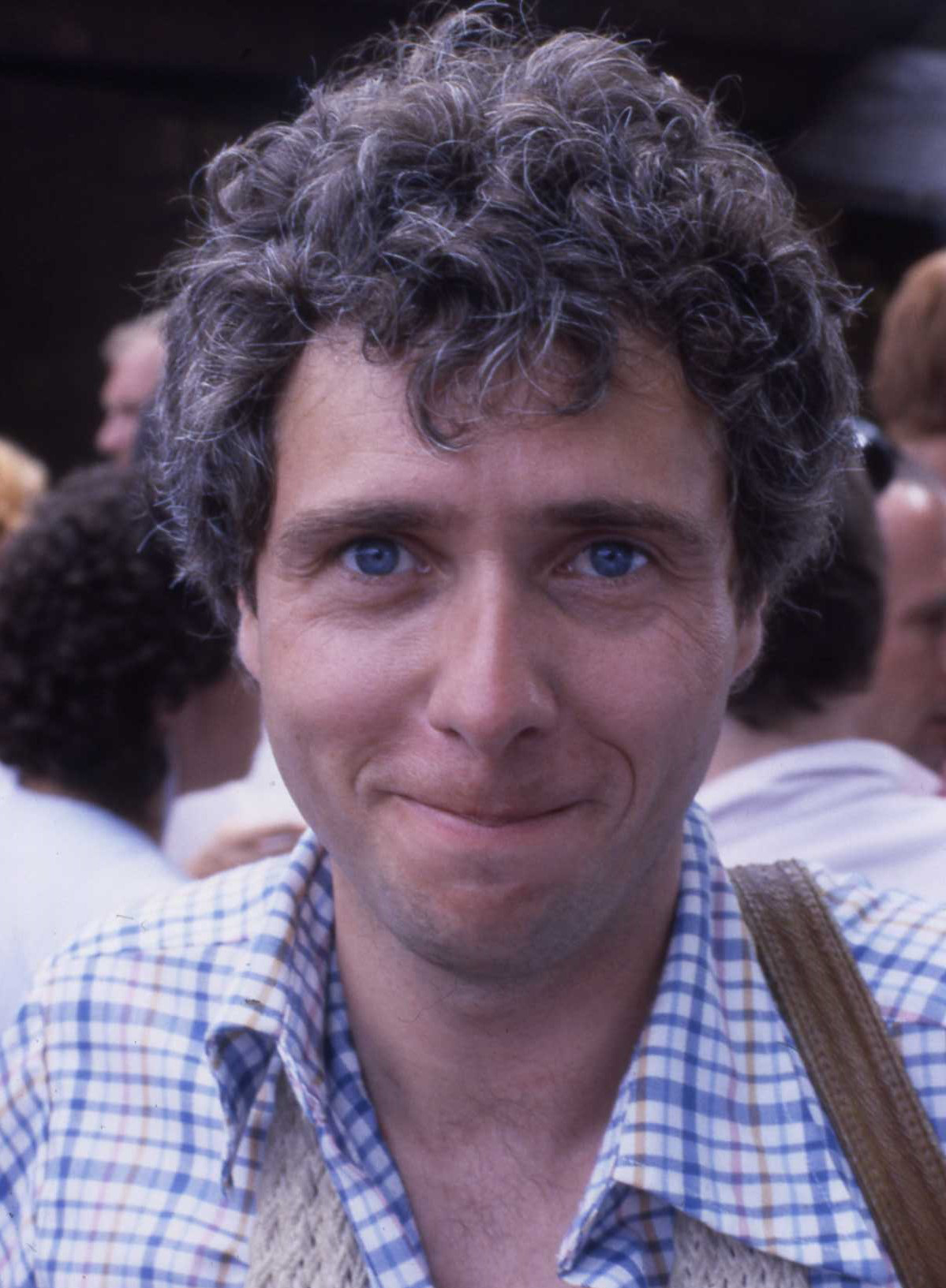
- Jim Yeadon in 1985

Member of the Madison Common Council from the 8th district
- In office 1976–1980
- Preceded by: Robert Wiedenbaum

Personal details
- Born: 1949 (age 76–77) Ontonagon, Michigan, United States
- Party: Independent
- Education: University of Wisconsin–Madison

Jim Yeadon (born 1949) is an American activist and politician who served on the Madison, Wisconsin, Common Council. First elected in 1977, Yeadon was the sixth openly gay or lesbian elected official in the United States, and the first male candidate who was openly gay at the time he was elected.

== Early life and education ==
Yeadon was born and raised in Ontonagon, Michigan. His father was an inventor, and the family moved frequently throughout his childhood. Yeadon's family moved to Manitowoc, Wisconsin, when he was in the ninth grade. He graduated from Lincoln High School in 1967. Yeadon earned an undergraduate degree in Indian Studies at the University of Wisconsin–Madison and then enrolled at the University of Wisconsin Law School.

== Advocacy and public office ==
Yeadon became a gay activist in the 1960s as a member of Wisconsin's first LGBTQ organization, the Madison Alliance for Homosexual Equality (MAHE). While a university student, he was also active in the Gay Law Student Association. During this time, Yeadon was appointed to the city's Equal Opportunities Commission.

=== Common Council (1976-1980) ===
After his initial appointment and subsequent election to the Madison Common Council at the age of 26, Yeadon was instrumental in framing the revised Equal Opportunities Ordinance which extended protections against discrimination in housing and employment to gays. It was a landmark achievement for LGBT rights in Wisconsin and across the nation. Yeadon was considered an authority on municipal gay rights ordinances in the mid-1970s.

Yeadon was the force behind the May 1977 "anti-Anita Bryant Bash" which attracted over 600 people to the Great Hall of the UW-Madison Memorial Union. As a City Council member, he worked on issues such as reforming the city Health Department, completing the State Street mall, legalizing marijuana, and extending bar hours until 2 a.m. A fellow alderman nicknamed him "the alderfaggot". Death threats and letters of encouragement came from across the United States during his time on the council.

Yeadon began practicing law in 1975, and after completing his City Council term in 1980 he began specializing in real estate law. In addition to his law practice, he has served as the director of the client rights office in the Wisconsin Department of Health Services Division of Mental Health and Substance Abuse.

== Personal life ==
During his early years in public life and activism, Yeadon was in a private relationship with David Clarenbach, a member of the Wisconsin Legislature and advocate for LGBT rights in Wisconsin.
