= Ernest J. Korpela =

20th century American politician

Member of the Wisconsin State Assembly from the Ashland–Bayfield–Iron district
- In office January 6, 1969 – January 1, 1973
- Preceded by: Bernard E. Gehrmann
- Succeeded by: District abolished

Personal details
- Born: December 19, 1936 (age 89) Wakefield, Michigan
- Party: Democratic
- Spouse: Janice Korpela
- Education: University of Wisconsin–Superior
- Profession: Educator

Ernest J. Korpela (born December 19, 1936) is a former member of the Wisconsin State Assembly.

== Biography ==
Korpela was born in Wakefield, Michigan. He attended Allan Hancock College and the University of Wisconsin-Superior.

== Career ==
Korpela was elected to the Assembly in 1968 and 1970. Previously, he was District Administrator of Schools in Solon Springs, Wisconsin from 1963–1966 and Superintendent of Schools of Washburn, Wisconsin, from 1966 to 1969. From 1969–1972 he served in the Wisconsin State Assembly serving on Assembly Education Committee and the Joint Committee on Finance in his second term. In 1972, Korpela was a candidate for the Wisconsin State Senate from the 25th district. He lost to Daniel Theno a Republican in a 3-way race when Edward Stack who Korpela had defeated in the Democratic primary filed as an independent drawing down over 5,000 votes. Korpela lost to Theno by 1,205 votes. Korpela is a Democrat. Korpela served as State Director of the Upper Great Lakes Regional Commission under Governor Martin Schreiber in late 1970s and as the Cooperative Educational Service Agency 12 Director for Northwestern Wisconsin (1981–1994). In retirement he served as interim Superintendent of Schools in Bayfield and Superior, Wisconsin(Source: Ernest Korpela 2/23/2018).

Korpela is the editor of the 2012 book Finn by Waino W. Korpela, published by Savage Press.
