= Tripp, Wisconsin =

- Town
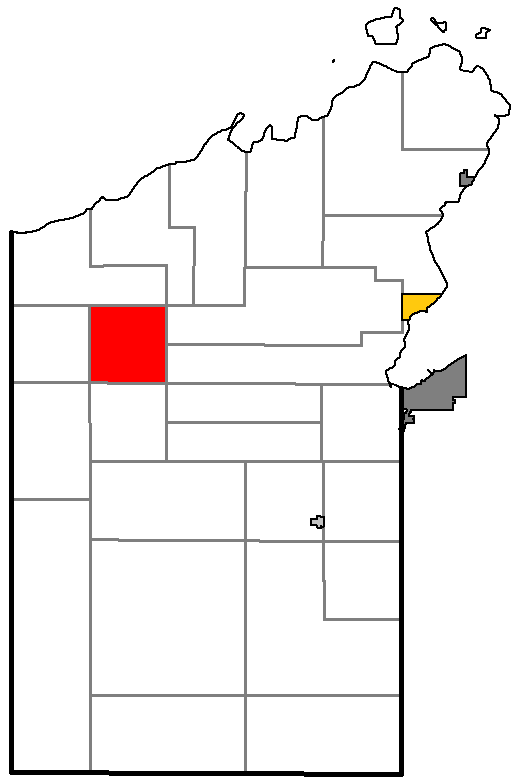
- Location of Tripp, within Bayfield County
- Coordinates: 46°37′5″N 91°21′46″W
- Country: United States
- State: Wisconsin
- County: Bayfield

Area
  - Total: 35.0 sq mi (90.6 km^{2})
  - Land: 34.7 sq mi (90.0 km^{2})
  - Water: 0.19 sq mi (0.5 km^{2})
- Elevation: 1,070 ft (326 m)

Population (2020)
  - Total: 244
  - Density: 7.02/sq mi (2.71/km^{2})
- Time zone: UTC-6 (Central (CST))
  - Summer (DST): UTC-5 (CDT)
- Area codes: 715 & 534
- FIPS code: 55-80750
- GNIS feature ID: 1584296

Tripp is a town in Bayfield County, Wisconsin, United States. The population was 244 at the 2020 census, up from 231 at the 2010 census.

== History ==
The town of Tripp was named after Winfield E. Tripp who settled on the Tripp homestead in the territory on October 14, 1890. Tripp was born in York County, Maine, on October 14, 1851. Tripp Territory was originally a part of the territory of Iron River, Wisconsin. On May 8, 1911, the legislature of Wisconsin created the town of Tripp from the north half of Iron River's territory. The first town meeting was held eight days later on May 16 at the Winfield E. Tripp home. The meeting was called to order by W.E. Tripp, and a special election board of three men was appointed, namely C.H. Townsend, R.E. Buck and Andrew Paulson, duly sworn. The inspectors of election appointed W.E. Tripp as clerk of this meeting with the full power of clerk. They then appointed C.H. Jackman and William G. Ziemer as ballot clerks, duly sworn. Printed tickets were prepared after a caucus had selected candidates for each of the offices and the polls held open until 5:00 P.M.

The ballot clerks kept a record of all the voters' names and a correct poll list was kept. The inspectors of the election made a written statement of the votes cast and the officers elected and read same in open town meeting. The whole number of votes cast was 13.

Officers elected:

- Chairman, W.E. Tripp, 13 votes.
- Supervisor, C.H. Townsend, 13 votes.
- Supervisor, John Schuett, 13 votes.
- Clerk, Andrew Paulson, 12 votes.
- Clerk, R.E. Buck 1 vote.
- Treasurer, Sophus Peterson, 13 votes.
- Assessor, R.E. Buck 13 votes.

Andrew Paulson would not qualify so C.H. Jackman was appointed clerk.

Justices of Peace:

- George Vinall
- W.E. Tripp
- J.C. Depta
- Sophus Peterson

All with 13 votes.

Constables:

- Gabriel Hegbloom
- W.G. Ziemer
- Luke Lavin
- All with 13 votes.

== Geography ==
According to the United States Census Bureau, the town has a total area of 35.0 square miles (90.6 km^{2}), of which 34.7 square miles (90.0 km^{2}) is land and 0.19 square miles (0.5 km^{2}), or 0.58%, is water.

== Demographics ==
As of the census of 2000, there were 209 people, 78 households, and 58 families residing in the town. The population density was 6.0 people per square mile (2.3/km^{2}). There were 130 housing units at an average density of 3.7 per square mile (1.4/km^{2}). The racial makeup of the town was 91.39% White, 0.96% African American, 4.78% Native American, and 2.87% from two or more races. Hispanic or Latino of any race were 0.48% of the population.

There were 78 households, out of which 41.0% had children under the age of 18 living with them, 64.1% were married couples living together, 2.6% had a female householder with no husband present, and 24.4% were non-families. 20.5% of all households were made up of individuals, and 6.4% had someone living alone who was 65 years of age or older. The average household size was 2.68 and the average family size was 3.08.

In the town, the population was spread out, with 30.6% under the age of 18, 3.8% from 18 to 24, 36.4% from 25 to 44, 20.1% from 45 to 64, and 9.1% who were 65 years of age or older. The median age was 34 years. For every 100 females, there were 120.0 males. For every 100 females age 18 and over, there were 123.1 males.

The median income for a household in the town was $35,000, and the median income for a family was $35,938. Males had a median income of $23,438 versus $16,250 for females. The per capita income for the town was $12,653. About 1.9% of families and 6.3% of the population were below the poverty line, including 10.2% of those under the age of eighteen and none of those 65 or over.
