= June Jaronitzky =

American politician (born 1938)

Member of the Wisconsin State Assembly
- In office January 3, 1983 – January 7, 1985
- Preceded by: Joanne M. Duren
- Succeeded by: Dale Schultz
- Constituency: 50th district
- In office January 5, 1981 – January 3, 1983
- Preceded by: David Kedrowski
- Succeeded by: Dale Bolle
- Constituency: 74th district

Personal details
- Born: June 9, 1938 (age 88) Edmonton, Alberta, Canada
- Party: Republican
- Education: Alberta College
- Profession: Former teacher

June Jaronitzky (born June 9, 1938) was a Republican politician and legislator from Wisconsin.

Born in Alberta, Canada, June graduated from Alberta College and MacTavish College. She served in the Wisconsin State Assembly for two terms. She was a member of the Bayfield County Republican Party, and the Iron River Speedway Association. June has worked many jobs including teaching, cheese making, and cost accounting. She has six children and is now retired in the Houston, Texas area.
