= Thomas S. Hanson =

American politician (born 1939)

Member of the Wisconsin State Assembly
- In office January 6, 1975 – January 1, 1979
- Preceded by: Mel J. Cyrak
- Succeeded by: Randall J. Radtke
- Constituency: 81st district
- In office January 4, 1971 – January 1, 1973
- Preceded by: Elmer C. Nitschke
- Succeeded by: District abolished
- Constituency: Dodge 2nd district

Personal details
- Born: September 14, 1939 (age 87) Oshkosh, Wisconsin, U.S.
- Party: Democratic
- Spouse: married
- Children: 4
- Education: University of Wisconsin–La Crosse (B.S.)

Thomas S. Hanson (born September 14, 1939) is a retired American teacher and Democratic politician. He served three terms in the Wisconsin State Assembly in the 1970s.

== Biography ==
Hanson was born on September 14, 1939, in Oshkosh, Wisconsin. He attended the University of Wisconsin–La Crosse, the Illinois Institute of Technology, the Stevens Institute of Technology and Marquette University.

== Career ==
Hanson was elected to the Assembly in 1970. He lost re-election in 1972 after redistricting, but subsequently regained his seat in 1974. He was a Democrat.
