= Robert W. Harer =

American politician

Robert W. Harer is a former member of the Wisconsin State Assembly.

== Biography ==
Harer was born on August 15, 1941, in Baldwin, Wisconsin. He is married with four children.

== Career ==
Harer was first elected to the Assembly in 1978. Additionally, he was a member of the Baldwin-Woodville District School Board from 1972 to 1978. He is a Republican.
