= James F. Laatsch =

American politician

James F. Laatsch is a former member of the Wisconsin State Assembly.

== Biography ==
Laatsch was born on April 16, 1940, in Tigerton, Wisconsin. He graduated from Concordia College, Concordia Senior College, and Concordia Seminary. Laatsch is married with three children.

== Career ==
Laatsch was elected to the Assembly in 1978 and re-elected in 1980. In 1982, he was defeated by Robert Thompson. He is a Republican.
