= Peter D. Bear =

American politician

Peter D. Bear is a former member of the Wisconsin State Assembly and Wisconsin State Senate.

== Biography ==
Bear was born on September 18, 1952, in Boston, Massachusetts. He graduated from The Bronx High School of Science in New York City before graduating with a B.A. from the University of Wisconsin-Madison and attending the University of Wisconsin Law School.

== Career ==
Bear was a Democratic member of the Assembly from 1977 to 1978. He was a member of the Senate from 1979 to 1980.

Wisconsin State Assembly
| Preceded by Norman C. Anderson | Member of the Wisconsin State Assembly from the 37th district January 3, 1977 – January 1, 1979 | Succeeded by David Travis |
Wisconsin Senate
| Preceded by Dale McKenna | Member of the Wisconsin Senate from the 13th district January 1, 1979 – October 1, 1980 | Succeeded by Barbara Lorman |
