= Michele Radosevich =

American politician and lawyer

Michele Radosevich (born October 7, 1947) is an American politician and lawyer.

Born in Minneapolis, Minnesota, Radosevich graduated from Marquette University in 1969. In 1976, Radosevich was elected to the Wisconsin State Senate serving from 1977 until 1981 as a Democrat. Radosevich moved to the state of Washington and graduated from the Seattle University School of Law, in 1994, and was admitted to the Washington State Bar. Radosevich practices law in Seattle, Washington.
