= Robert J. Larson =

American politician

Robert J. Larson is a former member of the Wisconsin State Assembly.

== Biography ==
Larson was born on December 4, 1932, in Osseo, Wisconsin. During the Korean War, Larson served in the United States Air Force. He later graduated from the University of Wisconsin–Eau Claire, the University of Wisconsin–Stout and the University of Minnesota. Larson is married with four children and six grandchildren.

== Political career ==
Larson was first elected to the Assembly in 1978. He is a Republican.
