= Stanley J. Lato =

American politician

Stanley Joseph Lato

Member of the Wisconsin State Assembly from the 34th district
- In office 1975–1979
- Preceded by: Joseph Sweda (Democrat)
- Succeeded by: Robert Larson (Republican)

Personal details
- Born: November 2, 1924 Thorp, Wisconsin
- Died: April 10, 2002 (aged 77)
- Party: Democratic
- Spouse: Elaine Barbara Lato
- Education: University of Wisconsin, Medford
- Profession: Dairy farmer, salesman, state representative

Stanley J. Lato (November 2, 1924 – April 10, 2002) was an American dairy farmer and politician.

Lato was born on November 2, 1924, in Thorp, Wisconsin. He graduated from Thorp High School. During World War II, Lato served in the United States Navy. Lato owned a dairy farm near Gilman WI. He was a member of the American Legion and the Veterans of Foreign Wars, as well as the Knights of Columbus. Lato died on April 10, 2002, in Stanley, Wisconsin.

== Political career ==
Lato was elected to the Wisconsin State Assembly in 1974 and 1976. Previously, he was chairman and Supervisor of Gilman, Taylor County, Wisconsin and Supervisor of Taylor County, Wisconsin from 1970 to 1972. He was a Democrat.

Lato introduced legislation to "encourage the consumption of Wisconsin cheese by designing an official logotype to serve as a recognizable identification mark appropriate for affixation to and display in connection with cheese produced in this state." The design for the cheese was the outline of the state of Wisconsin with the words "100% Wisconsin Cheese" and other specifications as deemed appropriate by the department of Commerce.

While serving he had committee assignments that included:

- 1975—Agriculture, Commerce and Consumer Affairs;Commerce & Consumer Affairs Com and its Subcom. on Costs of Retail Food Production; Health and Social Services; Tourism. Retail Food Production
- 1977—Agriculture, Commerce and Consumer Affairs; Revisions; State Affairs;
