= Randall J. Radtke =

American politician

Randall J. Radtke (born October 23, 1951, in Watertown, Wisconsin), is a former member of the Wisconsin State Assembly. He graduated from Watertown High School as well as the University of Wisconsin–Whitewater and the University of Wisconsin–Madison. He is married with two children and is a member of the Knights of Columbus.

== Career ==
Radtke was first elected to the Assembly in 1978 and served through 1992. He is a Republican.

He has been an active member of the Friends of Aztalan State Park, which has been noted as Wisconsin's premier archaeological site.
