= Kevin Soucie =

American politician

Member of the Wisconsin State Assembly from the 7th district
- In office January 6, 1975 – January 3, 1981
- Preceded by: Raymond J. Tobiasz
- Succeeded by: Joseph Czarnezki

Personal details
- Born: February 2, 1954 (age 72) Milwaukee, Wisconsin, U.S.
- Party: Democratic

Kevin Soucie (born February 2, 1954) is a former member of the Wisconsin State Assembly.

== Biography ==
Soucie was born on February 2, 1954, in Milwaukee, Wisconsin. He graduated from Alexander Hamilton High School before attending the University of Wisconsin–Madison and the University of Wisconsin–Milwaukee.

== Career ==
Soucie was elected to the Assembly in 1974. He is a Democrat.
