= Daniel Fischer (politician) =

American politician

Daniel Fischer is a former member of the Wisconsin State Assembly.

== Biography ==
Fischer was born on March 4, 1952, in Reedsville, Wisconsin. He graduated from the University of Wisconsin-Oshkosh and is married with one child.

== Career ==
Fischer was first elected to the Assembly in 1976. He is a Democrat.
