= David Clarenbach =

American politician

Speaker pro tempore of the Wisconsin State Assembly
- In office January 3, 1983 – January 4, 1993
- Preceded by: David Kedrowski (1981)
- Succeeded by: Tim Carpenter

Member of the Wisconsin State Assembly
- In office January 7, 1985 – January 4, 1993
- Preceded by: Wilfrid J. Turba
- Succeeded by: Tammy Baldwin
- Constituency: 78th district
- In office January 3, 1983 – January 7, 1985
- Preceded by: Bernard Lewison
- Succeeded by: DuWayne Johnsrud
- Constituency: 96th district
- In office January 6, 1975 – January 3, 1983
- Preceded by: Edward Nager
- Succeeded by: Wilfrid Turba
- Constituency: 78th district

Personal details
- Born: September 26, 1953 (age 72) St. Louis, Missouri, U.S.
- Party: Democratic
- Education: University of Wisconsin, Madison (attended)

David E. Clarenbach (born September 26, 1953) is a Wisconsin Democratic politician and gay activist who served nine terms in the Wisconsin State Assembly and as Speaker pro tempore for ten years.

== Early life and education ==
Clarenbach was born in St. Louis, Missouri and spent his kindergarten year in New York City before his parents moved to Madison. While in high school in Madison public schools, Clarenbach got involved in an effort to place student representatives on the Madison School Board, and in 1969, at age 16, he spent his spring break registering voters in rural Mississippi. Clarenbach studied politics at the University of Wisconsin–Madison from 1971 to 1976. He is the grandson of A. E. Frederick and son of National Organization for Women co-founder Kathryn F. Clarenbach and Henry Clarenbach, a delegate for Eugene McCarthy.

== Career ==
=== Elected office ===
Clarenbach was elected to the Dane County Board of Supervisors in 1972, at age 18. In 1974, he was elected a Madison alderman, before being elected to the Wisconsin State Assembly that same year at the age of 21, succeeding fellow Democrat Edward Nager.

In 1982, Clarenbach was widely credited with helping push through the first law in the country which prohibited discrimination in employment, housing and public accommodations on the basis of sexual orientation. It was a landmark achievement for LGBT rights in Wisconsin and across the nation. While in the assembly, Clarenbach also worked to improve lake quality and expand authority of the Wisconsin Department of Natural Resources, authored a new HIV confidentiality law, and an AIDS bill of rights.

In 1983 he was elected Speaker pro tempore of the Assembly, a position he held until 1993. Clarenbach served on the following committees: Agriculture; Assembly Organization; Financial Institutions and Insurance; Labor; Rules; Legislative Council; Judiciary; Commerce and Consumer Affairs; State Historical Society Board of Curators; and as chairperson of the Health Insurance Reform committee. His legislative papers are on deposit with the Wisconsin Historical Society.

Clarenbach did not seek re-election in 1992 but ran for Congress in Wisconsin's 2nd congressional district. In the Democratic primary election held on September 8, Clarenbach faced Ada Deer and lost with 31,961 votes (40.1%) to Deer's 47,777 (59.9%). Deer went on to lose to incumbent Republican Scott L. Klug in the general election.

He was succeeded in the assembly by Tammy Baldwin, who ran as the first openly gay legislative candidate in Wisconsin history.

=== Activism ===
Clarenbach led the Madison AIDS Support Network and later served as executive director of the Gay and Lesbian Victory Fund from 1996 to 1997. Clarenbach was also a member of the Urban League, Humane Society, ACLU of Wisconsin, and National Council of Senior Citizens. He was a voting delegate to the 1980, 1984 and 1988 Democratic National Conventions.

== Personal life ==
Clarenbach now works as a political consultant and lives in Madison, Wisconsin. He has served as the campaign treasurer for State Representative Chris Taylor.

=== Sexuality and political office ===
Clarenbach is openly gay, although he was not open during his political career in Madison. He told a reporter in 2001, "It was a different era. There were no openly gay elected officials.... Even in the liberal stronghold of Madison, it would have done more than raise eyebrows. It would’ve hampered a person's electability. Yet I think it's safe to say that every member of the Legislature and every member of the Capitol press corps knew I was gay.... The general consensus was not to intrude into one's personal life." He served as a mentor for fellow gay State Representative Tim Carpenter of Milwaukee. During his early years in public life and activism, Clarenbach was in a private relationship with Jim Yeadon, first openly-gay elected official and advocate for LGBT rights in Wisconsin.

Wisconsin State Assembly
Vacant Title last held by David Kedrowski; 1981	Speaker pro tempore of the Wisconsin State Assembly; 1983–1993	Succeeded by Tim Carpenter
