= John Gower (politician) =

American politician (1941–2011)

Member of the Wisconsin State Assembly from the 4th district
- In office January 1, 1973 – January 1, 1979
- Preceded by: District established
- Succeeded by: Gary T. Dilweg

Personal details
- Born: January 10, 1941 Kankakee, Illinois, U.S.
- Died: December 10, 2011 (aged 70) Green Bay, Wisconsin, U.S.
- Education: Marquette University

John C. Gower (January 10, 1941 – December 10, 2011) was an American Republican politician.

Born in Kankakee, Illinois, Gower received his bachelor and law degrees from Marquette University. Gower served as district attorney of Brown and Shawano Counties and on the Board of Supervisors of the two counties. He served in the Wisconsin State Assembly 1973–1979 from the 4th District. Gower died in Green Bay, Wisconsin on December 10, 2011. He was 70.
