= Stephen R. Leopold =

American politician

Stephen R. Leopold is a former member of the Wisconsin State Assembly.

== Biography ==
Leopold was born on June 19, 1944, in Jefferson City, Missouri. He graduated from Shorewood High School in Shorewood, Wisconsin, before earning a Bachelor of Arts degree from Stanford University in 1966 and attending graduate school at the University of Wisconsin–Milwaukee. During the Vietnam War, Leopold was a member of the United States Army Special Forces. He achieved the rank of captain before being held as a prisoner of war from 1968 to 1973. Leopold died in Puerto Vallarta, Mexico, on April 7, 2026, while undergoing heart surgery. Leopold was married with two children.

== Political career ==
Leopold was first elected to the Assembly in 1976. He is a Democrat.
