= Peter J. Tropman =

American politician

Peter J. Tropman (born December 5, 1944), is a former member of the Wisconsin State Assembly.

He in Buffalo, New York. He graduated from Avonworth High School in Pittsburgh, Pennsylvania, as well as Buffalo State College and the University of Wisconsin–Milwaukee.

== Career ==
Tropman was elected to the Assembly in 1972. He is a Democrat.
