= Jonathan B. Barry =

American politician

Jonathan B. Barry (born June 20, 1945) is an American politician, public servant, businessman, and farmer from Wisconsin. He was a member of the Wisconsin State Assembly from 1977–1981.

Born in Milwaukee, Wisconsin, Barry graduated from Shorewood High School. In 1967, he graduated from University of Wisconsin–Madison. He served in the Wisconsin State Assembly as a Democrat from 1977 to 1981 and was on the Dane County, Wisconsin Board of Supervisors. From 1981 to 1987, he was County Executive of Dane County. In 1986 he switched parties and ran for the Republican nomination for governor, finishing second to Tommy Thompson. He owns a farm in Dane County and is a businessman. In November 2015, Barry was appointed executive secretary of the Wisconsin Board of Commissioners of Public Lands. Barry also had served as Deputy Secretary of the Wisconsin Department of Safety and Professional Services and deputy secretary of the Wisconsin Department of Workforce Development.
