= David Kedrowski =

20th century American politician

Chief Clerk of the Wisconsin State Assembly
- In office January 5, 1981 – January 3, 1983
- Preceded by: Marcel Dandeneau
- Succeeded by: Joanne M. Duren

Member of the Wisconsin State Assembly from the 74th district
- In office January 1, 1973 – January 5, 1981
- Preceded by: District established
- Succeeded by: June Jaronitzky

Personal details
- Born: March 15, 1942 (age 84) Wisconsin Rapids, Wisconsin, U.S.
- Party: Democratic
- Spouse(s): Married, 2 children
- Education: University of Wisconsin–Stevens Point
- Profession: Teacher, politician

David R. Kedrowski (born March 15, 1942) is a retired American teacher and Democratic politician from Bayfield County, Wisconsin. He served eight years in the Wisconsin State Assembly, representing Wisconsin's 74th Assembly district from 1973 to 1981. He also served as chief clerk of the Assembly during the 85th Wisconsin Legislature (1981–1982).

== Biography ==
Born in Wisconsin Rapids, Wisconsin, Kedrowski graduated from the University of Wisconsin–Stevens Point in 1966. He served in the Wisconsin State Assembly for four terms, and was the Speaker pro tempore. He was a member of the Bayfield County Democratic Party, the Washburn Men's Club, and the Washburn Snowmobile Club.

Wisconsin State Assembly
Preceded by Ernest J. Korpela	Member of the Wisconsin State Assembly from the 74th district January 1, 1973 – January 5, 1981	Succeeded by June Jaronitzky
Preceded by Marcel Dandeneau	Chief Clerk of the Wisconsin State Assembly; January 5, 1981 – January 3, 1983	Succeeded by Joanne M. Duren
