= Richard E. Pabst =

American politician

Richard Elmer Pabst (November 3, 1933 – September 18, 2012) was a member of the Wisconsin State Assembly.

== Biography ==
Pabst was born on November 3, 1933, in Milwaukee, Wisconsin. After graduating from Pius XI High School, Pabst attended Milwaukee Area Technical College and the University of Wisconsin–Milwaukee. He also served in the United States Army.

Pabst died on September 18, 2012. He had two children and five grandchildren with his wife, Ruth.

== Political career ==
Pabst was elected to the Assembly in 1966. He was a Democrat.
