= Thomas Harnisch =

20th century American politician

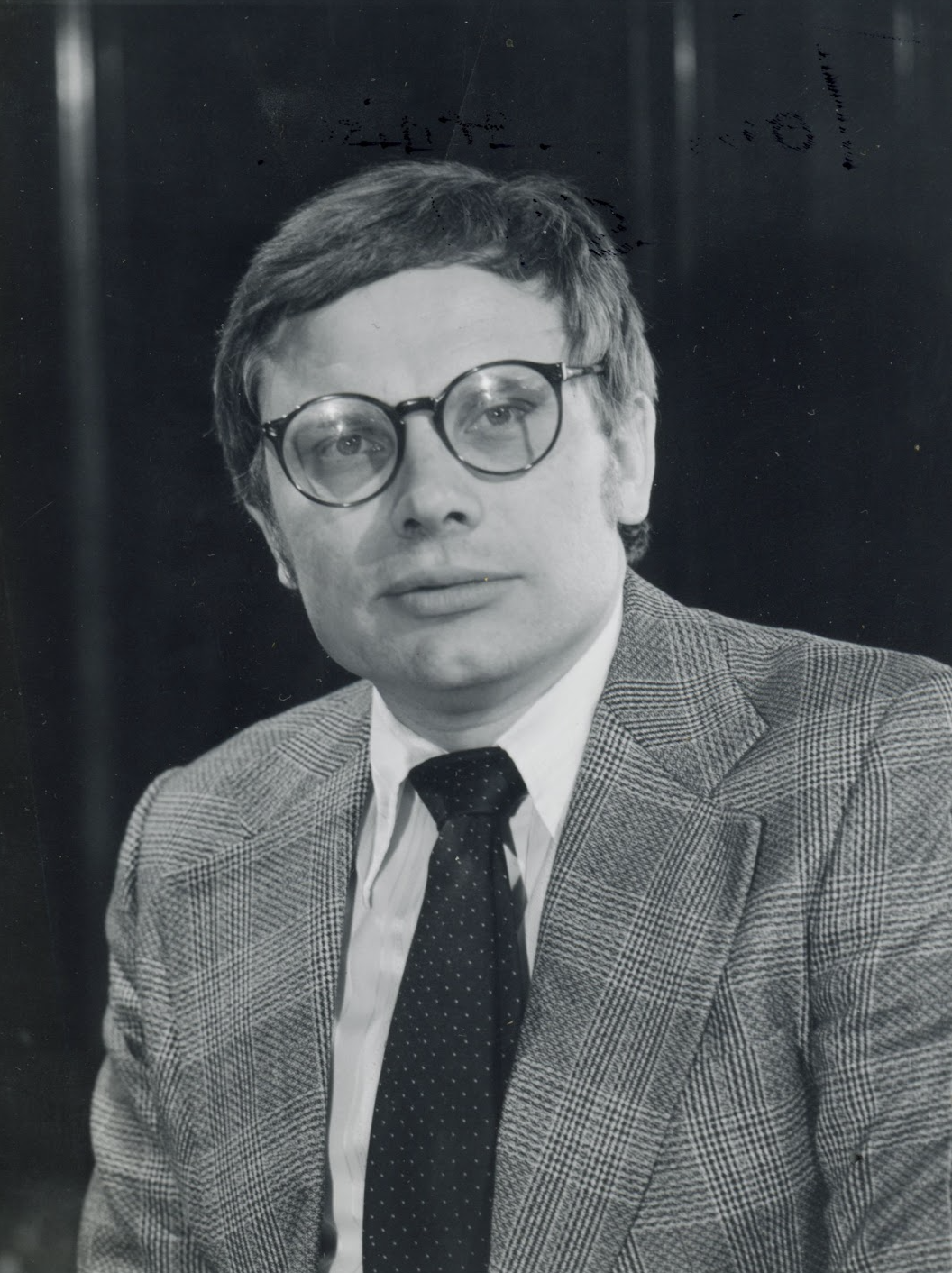

Member of the Wisconsin Senate from the 31st district
- In office January 6, 1975 – January 3, 1983
- Preceded by: Raymond C. Johnson
- Succeeded by: Rodney C. Moen

Personal details
- Born: January 16, 1947 (age 79) La Crosse, Wisconsin, U.S.
- Party: Democratic
- Spouse: Pamela Anne Theirl (m. 1977)
- Children: 5
- Education: University of Wisconsin–Madison; University of Minnesota Law School
- Profession: Lawyer

Thomas William Harnisch (born January 16, 1947) is an American lawyer and former politician from Clark County, Wisconsin. A Democrat, he served two terms in the Wisconsin Senate, representing Wisconsin's 31st Senate district from 1975 to 1983.

== Early life ==
Born in La Crosse, Wisconsin, Harnisch graduated from Gale-Ettrick High School. He earned a bachelor's degree from University of Wisconsin–Madison and a Juris Doctor degree from University of Minnesota Law School.

== Wisconsin Senate ==
Harnisch was a member of a class of freshman Senate Democrats that included Gary Goyke, Kathryn Morrison, and Timothy Cullen. The 1974 election marked the first time Democrats won control of the Wisconsin Senate since 1893.

Harnisch took an interest in higher education and conservation during his two terms in the Senate. He crafted legislation creating the University of Wisconsin School of Veterinary Medicine and was one of the leaders in creating the Robert M. La Follette School of Public Affairs at the University of Wisconsin–Madison. He also helped create a graduate program in energy analysis and policy at the University of Wisconsin–Madison.

Harnisch authored the Wisconsin Farmland Preservation Act, a state program designed to preserve farmland, provide property tax relief to farmers, and prevent soil erosion. He also authored legislation creating the Inland Waters Trout Stamp program, which used its proceeds for restoring and improving trout habitats. The program is considered a national model today. He was the architect of the Wisconsin Conservation Corps, a conservation and youth employment program modeled after the Civilian Conservation Corps. Harnisch introduced the legislation in 1981, which was vetoed by Governor Lee S. Dreyfus. The bill was reintroduced by Thomas A. Loftus and signed into law in 1983. Harnisch was appointed by Governor Tony Earl as the first chair of the Wisconsin Conservation Corps Board. The program remained active until 2003. He was also an early proponent of state policies to encourage recycling as well as investments in alternative energy sources, including solar energy.

In 1981, Harnisch faced an unsuccessful recall election campaign over his support for soil and water conservation legislation. The campaign drew controversy over alleged involvement by the Necedah Shrine religious group and the extremist organization Posse Comitatus. Harnisch was aided during the recall effort by attorney Russell Feingold.

== Post-Senate activities ==
Harnisch received the Wisconsin Idea Award in Natural Resource Policy in 1989 for his leadership in agricultural and rural development policy, including the Farmland Preservation Act. He remained active in politics as Wisconsin co-chair of the 1988 presidential campaign of Al Gore, later as a Gore delegate at the 1988 Democratic National Convention. He was long affiliated with the Wisconsin Towns Association later in his career.

== Personal life and family ==
Harnisch married Pamela Ann Theirl, a kindergarten teacher, on January 29, 1977. They have five adult children and still reside in Neillsville, Wisconsin.

== Electoral history ==
Wisconsin Senate 31st District, 1974
Party	Candidate	Votes	%	±%
Primary election, September 10, 1974
Democratic	Thomas Harnisch	4,017	46.35%	
Democratic	Albert T. Lahmeyer	3,005	34.68%	
Democratic	Marion C. Michaels	1,644	18.97%	
Total votes		8,666	100.0%	
General election, November 5, 1974
Democratic	Thomas Harnisch	21,675	56.11%	
Republican	Harold J. LaChapelle	16,955	43.89%	
Plurality		4,720	12.22%	
Total votes		38,639	100.0%	

Wisconsin Senate 31st District, 1978
Party	Candidate	Votes	%	±%
Primary election, September 12, 1978
Democratic	Thomas Harnisch	6,908	72.82%	
Democratic	John Q. Radcliffe	2,578	27.18%	
Total votes		9,486	100.0%	
General election, November 7, 1978
Democratic	Thomas Harnisch	23,746	50.38%	
Republican	Howard Sturtz	23,386	49.62%	
Plurality		360	.76%	
Total votes		47,132	100.0%	

Wisconsin Senate
Preceded by Raymond C. Johnson	Member of the Wisconsin Senate from the 31st district January 6, 1975 – January 3, 1983	Succeeded by Rodney C. Moen
