= Walter L. Ward Jr. =

American politician

Member of the Wisconsin State Assembly from the 17th district
- In office January 1, 1973 – January 5, 1981
- Preceded by: District created
- Succeeded by: Annette Polly Williams

Personal details
- Born: Walter L. Ward Jr. October 28, 1943 (age 82) Tullahoma, Tennessee
- Party: Democratic

Walter L. Ward Jr. (born October 28, 1943) was a member of the Wisconsin State Assembly.

== Early life ==
Ward was born on October 28, 1943, in Camp Forrest in Tullahoma, Tennessee. He graduated from the Rufus King International School - High School Campus before attending Milwaukee Area Technical College, the University of Wisconsin–Milwaukee and Marquette University.

== Career ==
Ward served in the Wisconsin Assembly from 1973 to 1981 and was a Democrat.

He was charged with sexual assault and was defeated in the next election. He was then accused of 85 election law violations for transferring funds from his campaign fund to his personal accounts. He was found guilty and sentenced to 30 days in jail. (1980)
