= Phillip James Tuczynski =

American politician

Member of the Wisconsin State Assembly from the 9th district
- In office January 6, 1975 – January 3, 1983
- Preceded by: Jerry Kleczka
- Succeeded by: Thomas W. Meaux

Personal details
- Born: January 11, 1947 (age 79) Milwaukee, Wisconsin
- Party: Democratic

Phillip James Tuczynski (born January 11, 1947) is a former member of the Wisconsin State Assembly.

He born in Milwaukee, Wisconsin. He attended the University of Wisconsin–Milwaukee and the University of Wisconsin Law School.

== Career ==
Tuczynski was first elected to the Assembly in 1974. He is a Democrat.
