= Joseph Czerwinski =

American legislator

Joseph Czerwinski (February 15, 1944 – August 14, 1998) was an American politician. He served in the Wisconsin State Assembly from 1969 to 1981.

Born in Milwaukee, Wisconsin, Czerwinski attended the University of Wisconsin–Milwaukee. Czerwinski served in the Wisconsin State Assembly as a Democrat from 1969 until 1981. He died in Milwaukee.
