= Roger P. Murphy =

American jurist and politician

Roger P. Murphy (October 17, 1923 – July 11, 2009) was an American jurist and politician.

Born in Lancaster, Wisconsin, Murphy graduated from University of Wisconsin–Madison and received his law degree from University of Wisconsin Law School. During World War II, Murphy served in the United States Army Air Forces. Murphy served as Waukesha County, Wisconsin District Attorney from 1961 until 1971 and lived in Waukesha, Wisconsin. He then served in the Wisconsin State Senate as a Republican from 1971 until he resigned in 1980 when he was appointed a Wisconsin Circuit Court judge serving until his retirement in 1999.
