= Richard A. Flintrop =

American politician

Richard Allan Flintrop (1945–2023) was a member of the Wisconsin State Assembly.

== Biography ==
Flintrop was born on December 15, 1945, in Milwaukee, Wisconsin. He graduated from East Troy High School in East Troy, Wisconsin, before attending the University of Wisconsin-Oshkosh, American University and George Washington University. He died from congestive heart failure on May 13, 2023.

== Career ==
Flintrop was elected to the Assembly in 1972. In 1979, he was a candidate in the Democratic primary for the United States House of Representatives from Wisconsin's 6th congressional district, losing to Gary R. Goyke. Goyke would lose to Tom Petri in the general election. Additionally, Flintrop was Vice Chairman of the Winnebago County, Wisconsin, Democratic Party.
