= David W. Opitz =

American politician

David W. Opitz is a former member of the Wisconsin State Assembly and the Wisconsin State Senate.

== Early life ==
Opitz was born on December 15, 1945, in Port Washington, Wisconsin. He graduated from Carroll University and became a biologist.

== Career ==
From 1971 to 1973, he served as Director of Environmental Health of Ozaukee County, Wisconsin. In 2019 Opitz was one of three plaintiffs in a suit filed in Ozaukee County District court that moved to hold Governor Evers of Wisconsin accountable to follow the law and require county clerks to clean the voter rolls every 30 days after receipt of a returned mailed postcard. Evers was ordering clerks to allow 200 days before cleaning up voter rolls. Local Judge Paul V. Malloy ordered that state law compelled him to order non conforming voter names of moved addresses be stricken from the voter rolls. Malloy refused to grant standing to the left leaning League of Women Voters, to intervene in the case.

The Wisconsin Democracy Campaign, which Malloy also denied standing, also filed suit in federal court to halt the contested purging. Wisconsin's Democratic Attorney General Josh Kaul also filed a notice of appeal to halt the voter roll updating, acting on behalf of the state's Elections Commission and requesting to stay of Malloy's order. The issue was brought before the court by the Wisconsin Institute for Law and Liberty (WILL). The Institute is a Wisconsin organization mostly supported by the Bradley Foundation, which funds such political causes. The lawsuit demanded that the Wisconsin Election Commission respond to a "Movers Report," generated from voter data analysis produced by the Electronic Registration Information Center (ERIC), a national, non-partisan partnership funded in 2012 by the Pew Charitable Trusts. ERIC shares voter registration information to improve the accuracy of voter rolls. The report tagged voters who may have moved to an address that had not yet been updated on their voter registration forms. Wisconsin may be forced to comply with Malloy's order.

On January 2, 2020, WILL said it asked the circuit court to hold the Elections Commission in contempt, fining it up to $12,000 daily, until it carries out Malloy's December 17, 2019, order to follow state law and purge from the voting rolls hundreds of thousands of registered voters who are confirmed to have moved to a different address, thus inflating the voter rolls. Those residents will need to register to vote at their new address. The case is being litigated in a state appeals court, but it was thought that the conservative leaning Wisconsin Supreme Court would be likely to hear it. Ozaukee County is heavily Republican, having voted for a Democratic presidential candidate only once after 1936 when it voted for Lyndon Johnson in 1964.

== Political career ==
Opitz was elected to the Assembly in 1972. In April 1979, Opitz won a special election to the state Senate from the 20th District and was reelected in 1980, remaining a member until 1984. He is a Republican. Opitz was appointed Chairman of the Wisconsin Republican Party by Gov. Tommy Thompson from 1990 to 1999.
