= Robert Quackenbush (politician) =

American politician (1923–2006)

Robert L. Quackenbush (November 15, 1923 – October 6, 2006) was a Wisconsin politician.

Born in Sparta, Wisconsin, he served in the United States Military during World War II. Quackenbush graduated from University of Wisconsin–La Crosse and served in the Wisconsin State Assembly from 1971 until 1983. Quachenbush taught school in Tomah, Wisconsin and worked for the Monroe County, Wisconsin Human Services.
