= George Klicka =

American politician

George H. Klicka (born December 23, 1934) is an American businessman and former politician.

Born in Milwaukee, Wisconsin, Klicka served in the United States Army and Wisconsin National Guard during the Berlin Crisis. He went to Marquette University and was a print ink salesman. He also owned and operated Air Clear Inc. Klicka served in the Wisconsin State Assembly 1967–1983 as a Republican and lived in Wauwatosa, Wisconsin.
