= Kurt Frank =

American politician

Kurt A. Frank was a Wisconsin lawyer who served three terms as a Democratic member of the Wisconsin State Senate.

== Biography ==
Frank was born on March 20, 1945, in Milwaukee, Wisconsin. He is a graduate of the University of Wisconsin–Milwaukee and Marquette University. Frank became a lawyer and served in the Army National Guard.

== Political career ==
In 1970, Frank unseated 73-year-old conservative Democratic incumbent Senator Leland McParland, who had been in the legislature since winning office in 1940, in a four-way Democratic primary. Frank served as a member of the Senate from 1971 to 1983; he did not run for re-election in 1982, after his district was redistricted, and was succeeded by fellow Democrat Gerald D. Kleczka.
