= Daniel Theno =

American politician and educator (born 1947)

Dan Theno

Member of the Wisconsin Senate from the 25th district
- In office January 1, 1973 – January 5, 1987
- Preceded by: Arthur Cirilli
- Succeeded by: Robert Jauch

Personal details
- Born: May 8, 1947 (age 79) Ashland, Wisconsin
- Party: Republican
- Education: University of Wisconsin–Madison

Daniel O. Theno (born May 8, 1947) was an American politician and educator.

Born in Ashland, Wisconsin, Theno graduated with a BS from the University of Wisconsin–Madison in 1969. He spent his senior year teaching at the University of Rio Grade do Sol in Porto Alegre, Brazil, under a university fellowship. He taught agriculture. Theno won a special election to the Wisconsin State Senate in 1972 from the 25th District of northern Wisconsin, defeating Ernest J. Korpela. He was re-elected in 1974, 1978, and 1982. In April 1986, Theno was elected mayor of Ashland, Wisconsin.
