= Delmar DeLong =

American lawyer, politician, and farmer (1931–1999)

Personal details
- Born: February 6, 1931 Beloit, Wisconsin, U.S.
- Died: October 7, 1999 (aged 68) Wisconsin, U.S.
- Party: Republican
- Education: University of Wisconsin–Madison
- Profession: Lawyer, politician, U.S. Army veteran

Delmar E. DeLong (June 7, 1931 – June 30, 1999) was an American lawyer, Wisconsin State Representative and farmer.

Born in Beloit, Wisconsin, DeLong served in the United States Army from 1953 to 1955. He received his bachelor's degree and law degrees from University of Wisconsin–Madison. He practiced law, was a farmer, and in the feed and grain business. He served as municipal court judge for the town of Turtle, Wisconsin, the Clinton, Wisconsin village board and Clinton Board of Education. He served in the Wisconsin State Assembly from 1973 to 1982 as a Republican. He also served on the Wisconsin Technical College Board. He died in Ocala, Florida.
