= Thomas B. Murray =

American politician

Thomas B. Murray was a member of the Wisconsin State Assembly.

== Biography ==
Murray was born Thomas Byron Murray on May 12, 1938, in Superior, Wisconsin. He graduated from the University of Wisconsin-Superior, served in the United States Army and was an undersheriff. He was married with two children. Murray died on January 6, 1998, in Duluth, Minnesota.

== Political career ==
Murray was a member of the Assembly from 1973 to 1981. Previously, he was a member of the Douglas County, Wisconsin Board of Supervisors. He was a Democrat.
