= Wisconsin's 94th Assembly district =

American legislative district in western Wisconsin

Wisconsin's 94th State Assembly district
- 2024 map defined in 2023 Wisc. Act 94; 2022 map defined in Johnson v. Wisconsin Elections Commission; 2011 map was defined in 2011 Wisc. Act 43
Assemblymember
Steve Doyle; D–Onalaska
since May 17, 2011 (15 years)
- Demographics: 90.67% White; 1.22% Black; 1.72% Hispanic; 4.61% Asian; 1.18% Native American; 0.08% Hawaiian/Pacific Islander
- Population (2020) • Voting age: 59,265; 45,020
- Website: Official website
- Notes: Western Wisconsin

The 94th Assembly district of Wisconsin is one of 99 districts in the Wisconsin State Assembly. Located in western Wisconsin, the district comprises parts of northern La Crosse County and southeast Trempealeau County. It includes the cities of Galesville and Onalaska, and the villages of Ettrick, Holmen, and West Salem, along with part of the north side of the city of La Crosse. The district is represented by Democrat Steve Doyle, since May 2011.

The 94th Assembly district is located within Wisconsin's 32nd Senate district, along with the 95th and 96th Assembly districts.

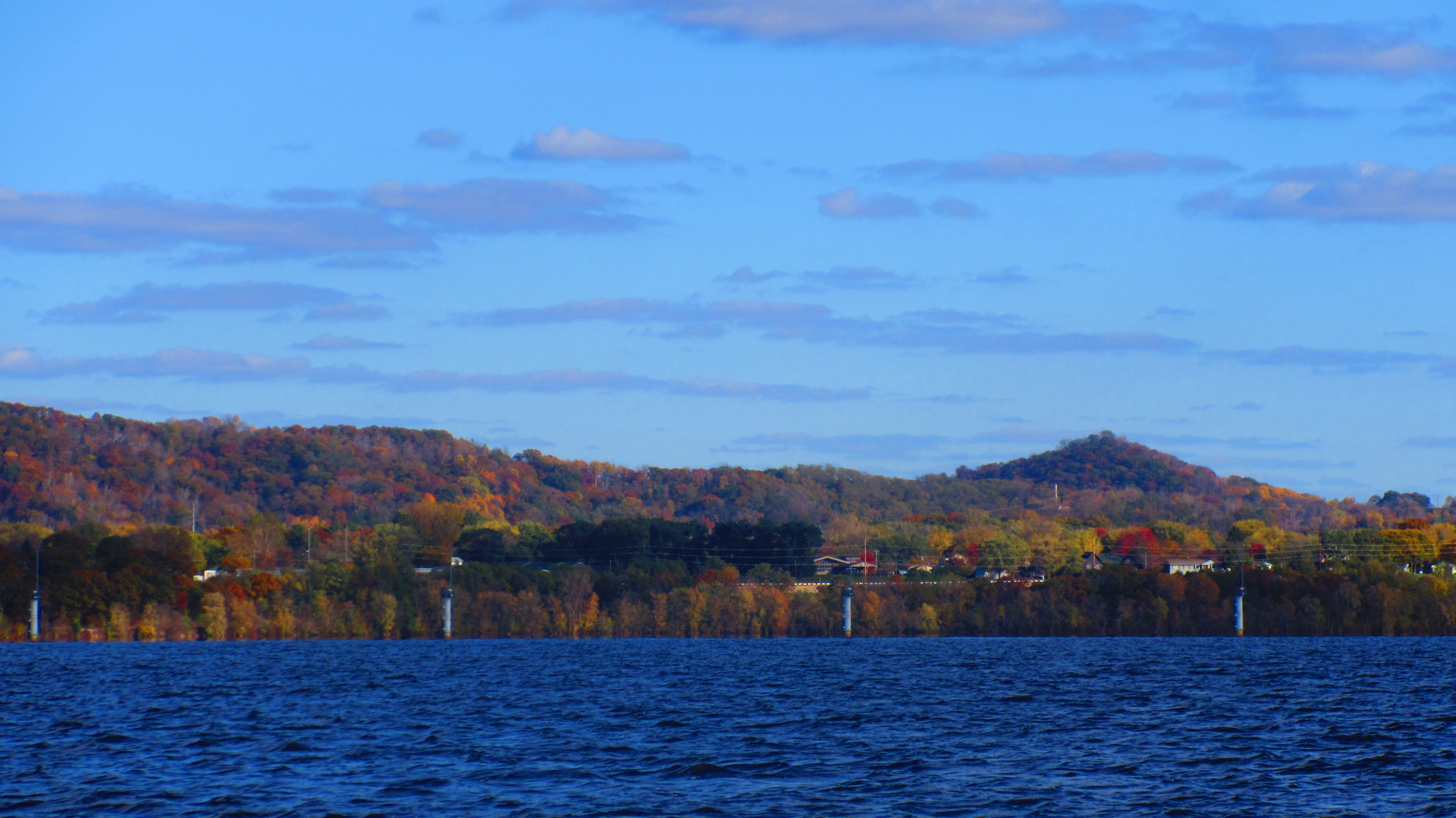
Onalaska viewed from Lake Onalaska

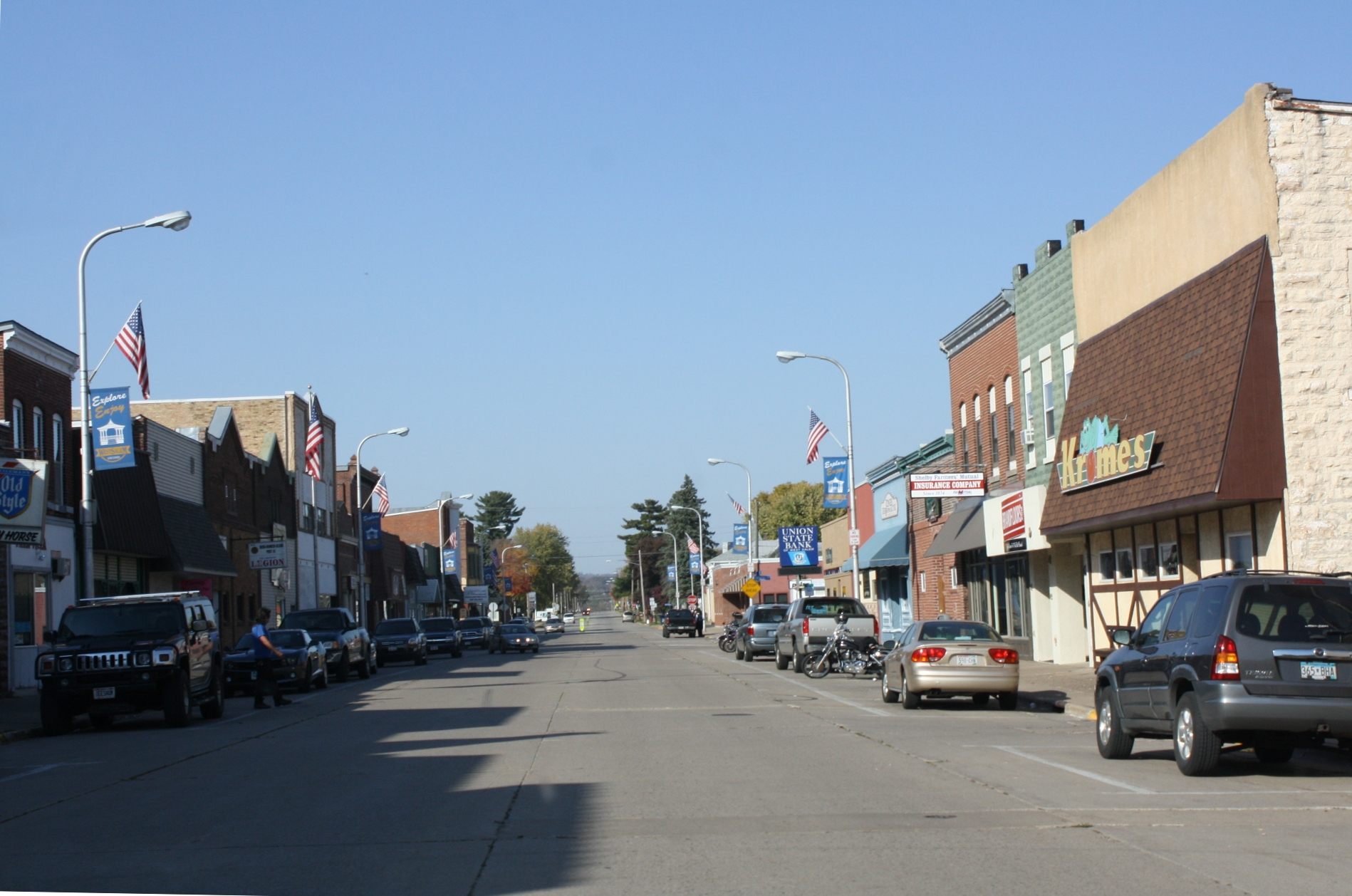
Village of West Salem

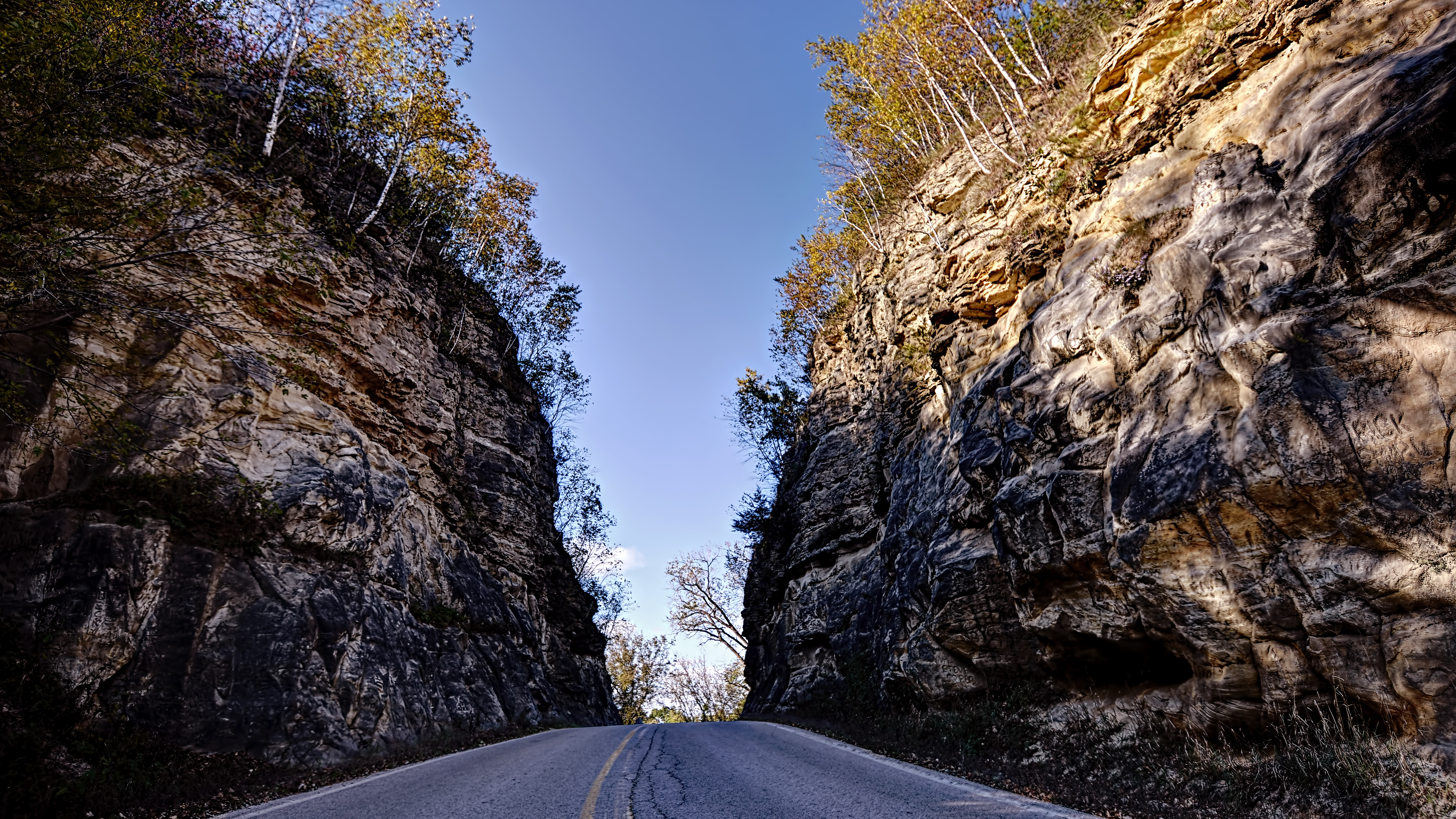
The Mindoro Cut in the town of Hamilton

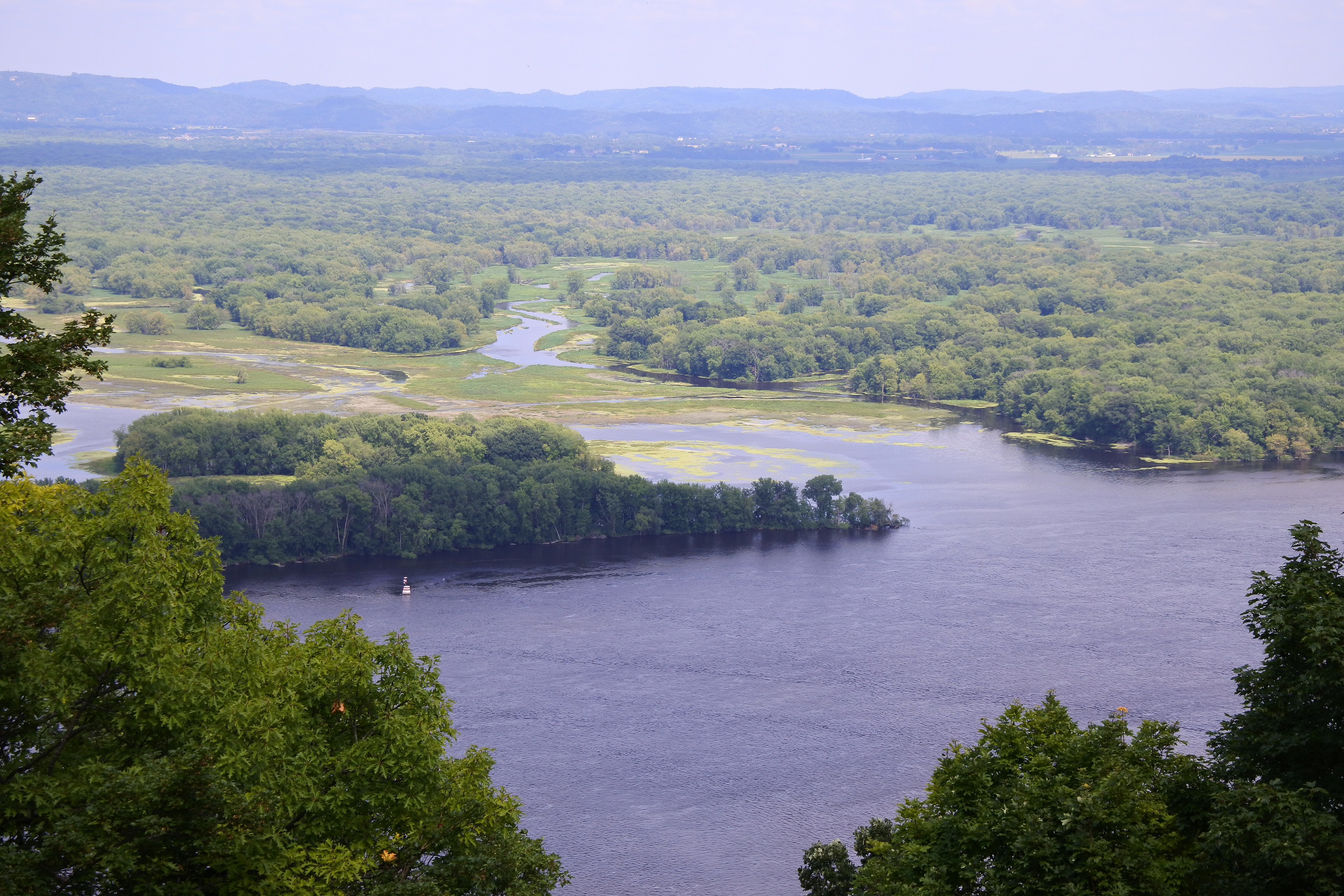
Black River delta

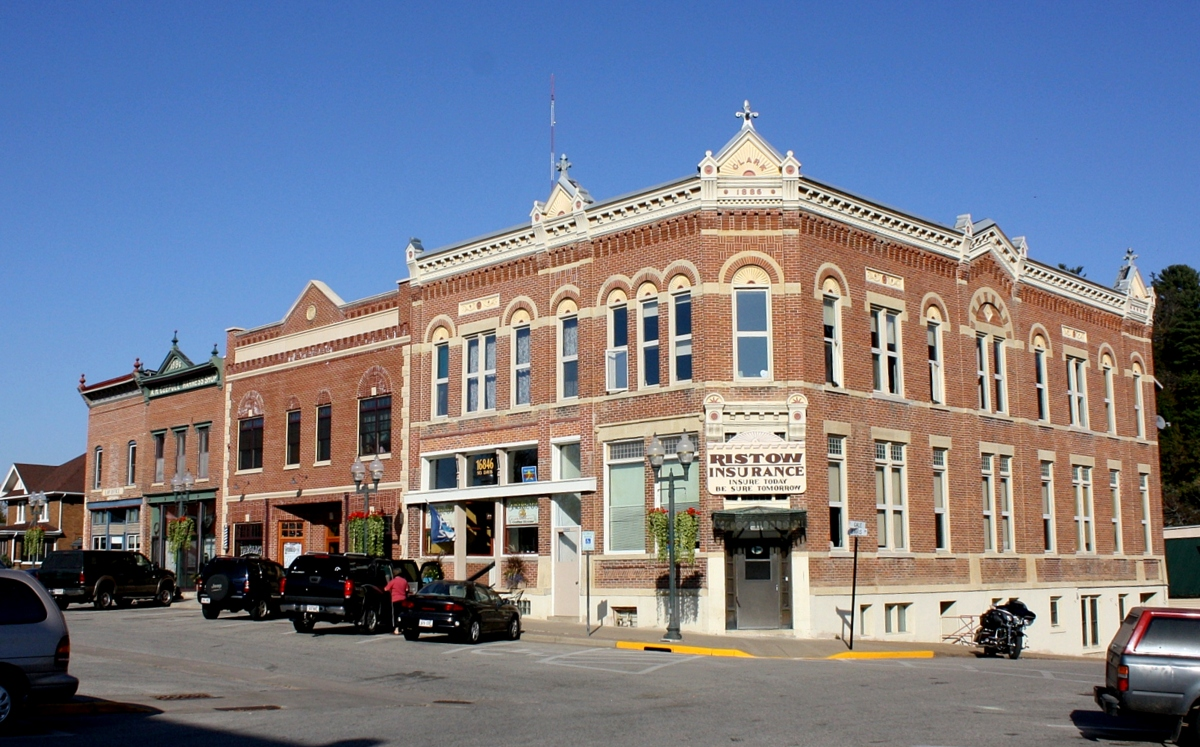
Downtown Historic District in Galesville

== History ==
The district was created in the 1972 redistricting act (1971 Wisc. Act 304) which first established the numbered district system, replacing the previous system which allocated districts to specific counties. The 94th district was drawn mostly in line with the boundaries of the previous La Crosse 2nd district, which comprised nearly all of La Crosse County outside of the city of La Crosse. The new district also comprised most of La Crosse County and extending north into southwest Jackson County and southern Trempealeau County. The last representative of the La Crosse 2nd district, Virgil Roberts, was elected in 1972 as the first representative of the 94th Assembly district. Over the decades, the location of the 94th district has been unusually consistent through redistricting cycles, with the only serious deviation being the 1982 court-ordered plan.

The 1982 court-ordered redistricting plan briefly moved the district into western Madison, but the 1983 redistricting act restored the district to its previous region. Under the 1983 plan, most of La Crosse County was restored to the district, but the areas in Trempealeau and Jackson were not retained. Instead the district stretched east into southwestern Monroe County. The 1992 plan shrunk the Monroe County portion of the district as population growth in La Crosse County outpaced the other parts of the district. The 2002 plan removed the remaining parts of the city of La Crosse from the district and added more of the remaining towns of La Crosse County and one additional town in Monroe County. The 2011 redistricting act removed the remaining parts of Monroe County from the district and exchanged the town of Campbell for most of the remaining parts of the town of Shelby. The 2022 court-ordered redistricting removed parts of northeastern La Crosse County and parts of the town of Shelby.

The 2024 redistricting (2023 Wisc. Act 94) removed the southern half of La Crosse County and added in areas of southern Trempealeau County. The 94th Assembly district has consistently been one of the most competitive districts in the state legislature, and that is projected to continue under the new map configuration.

== List of past representatives ==
List of representatives to the Wisconsin State Assembly from the 94th district
Member	Party	Residence	Counties represented	Term start	Term end	Ref.
District created
Virgil Roberts	Dem.	Holmen	La Crosse, Jackson, Trempealeau	January 1, 1973	January 3, 1983	
Mary Lou Munts	Dem.	Madison	Dane	January 3, 1983	January 7, 1985	
Sylvester G. Clements	Rep.	Washington	La Crosse, Monroe	January 7, 1985	January 5, 1987	
Virgil Roberts	Dem.	Holmen	La Crosse, Monroe	January 5, 1987	January 2, 1995	
Michael Huebsch	Rep.	West Salem	La Crosse, Monroe	January 2, 1995	January 3, 2011	
--Vacant--			La Crosse, Monroe	January 3, 2011	May 17, 2011	
Steve Doyle	Dem.	Onalaska	La Crosse	May 17, 2011	Current	

== Electoral history ==
Year	Date	Elected				Defeated				Total	Plurality	Other primary candidates
1972	Nov. 7	Virgil Roberts	Democratic	10,235	54.31%	Norbert Nuttelman	Rep.	8,609	45.69%	18,844	1,626	Leo P. Simones (Rep.)
1974	Nov. 5	Virgil Roberts (inc)	Democratic	7,823	57.37%	Fred W. Schomberg	Rep.	5,812	42.63%	13,635	2,011	Leo P. Simones (Rep.)
1976	Nov. 2	Virgil Roberts (inc)	Democratic	12,802	56.74%	Fred W. Schomberg	Rep.	9,762	43.26%	22,564	3,040	
1978	Nov. 7	Virgil Roberts (inc)	Democratic	7,794	50.69%	Stanley W. Peterson	Rep.	7,583	49.31%	15,377	211	Mary Jane Nelson (Rep.)
1980	Nov. 4	Virgil Roberts (inc)	Democratic	14,730	57.46%	Stanley W. Peterson	Rep.	10,904	42.54%	25,634	3,826	Myron E. Holley (Rep.); Terry M. Musser (Rep.)
1982	Nov. 2	Mary Lou Munts	Democratic	14,340	65.38%	Joyce D. Waldrop	Rep.	7,593	34.62%	21,933	6,747	Curis Vaughn Brink (Rep.)
1984	Nov. 6	Sylvester G. Clements	Republican	10,959	51.82%	Steve Doyle	Dem.	10,190	48.18%	21,149	769	Donald Bina (Dem.); Myron E. Holley (Rep.); Karle E. Krueger (Dem.); Robert M. Mason (Rep.)
1986	Nov. 4	Virgil Roberts	Democratic	8,734	50.38%	Sylvester G. Clements (inc)	Rep.	8,603	49.62%	17,337	131	Steven P. Doyle (Dem.)
1988	Nov. 8	Virgil Roberts (inc)	Democratic	11,422	50.50%	Sylvester G. Clements	Rep.	11,198	49.50%	22,620	224	Darrel A. Talcott (Rep.)
1990	Nov. 6	Virgil Roberts (inc)	Democratic	9,526	55.98%	Catherine Onsager	Rep.	7,490	44.02%	17,016	2,036	Sylvester G. Clements (Rep.); Michael Huebsch (Rep.); Wayne E. Selbrede (Rep.); Darrel A. Talcott (Rep.)
1992	Nov. 3	Virgil Roberts (inc)	Democratic	13,274	52.63%	Sylvester G. Clements	Rep.	11,948	47.37%	25,222	1,326	Robin R. Hanson (Rep.); Shirley Holman (Rep.)
1994	Nov. 8	Michael Huebsch	Republican	8,690	51.70%	Virgil Roberts (inc)	Dem.	8,118	48.30%	16,808	572	Sylvester G. Clements (Rep.)
1996	Nov. 5	Michael Huebsch	Republican	12,648	53.15%	Brad Pfaff	Dem.	10,580	44.46%	23,797	2,068	
1996	Nov. 5	Michael Huebsch	Republican	12,648	53.15%	Jim Milliren	Ind.	569	2.39%	23,797	2,068	
1998	Nov. 3	Michael Huebsch (inc)	Republican	12,797	68.20%	Rick Durst	Dem.	5,967	31.80%	18,764	6,830	
2000	Nov. 7	Michael Huebsch (inc)	Republican	19,275	67.85%	Dirk Mulder	Dem.	9,091	32.00%	28,407	10,184	
2002	Nov. 5	Michael Huebsch (inc)	Republican	11,136	60.33%	Vicki Burke	Dem.	7,304	39.57%	18,459	3,832	
2004	Nov. 2	Michael Huebsch (inc)	Republican	18,051	57.91%	Vicki Burke	Dem.	13,079	41.96%	31,169	4,972	Mark Seitz (Dem.)
2006	Nov. 7	Michael Huebsch (inc)	Republican	12,917	57.92%	James Kinsman	Dem.	8,059	36.14%	22,302	4,858	
2006	Nov. 7	Michael Huebsch (inc)	Republican	12,917	57.92%	John Sarnowski	Ind.	1,312	5.88%	22,302	4,858	
2008	Nov. 4	Michael Huebsch (inc)	Republican	17,719	54.04%	Cheryl Hancock	Dem.	15,054	45.91%	32,791	2,665	
2010	Nov. 2	Michael Huebsch (inc)	Republican	13,979	58.85%	Cheryl Hancock	Dem.	9,768	41.12%	23,754	4,211	
2011	May 3	Steve Doyle	Democratic	8,369	53.66%	John Lautz	Rep.	7,219	46.29%	15,596	1,150	Steve Freng (Rep.); Cheryl Hancock (Dem.); Jon Hetland (Rep.); Lynnetta Kopp (Rep.); Jake Speed (Rep.)
2012	Nov. 6	Steve Doyle (inc)	Democratic	18,566	60.59%	Bruce Evers	Rep.	12,068	39.38%	30,644	6,498	Kevin Hintz (Rep.)
2014	Nov. 4	Steve Doyle (inc)	Democratic	13,670	54.06%	Tracie Happel	Rep.	11,617	45.94%	25,287	2,053	
2016	Nov. 8	Steve Doyle (inc)	Democratic	16,721	52.63%	Julian Bradley	Rep.	15,049	47.37%	31,770	1,672	
2018	Nov. 6	Steve Doyle (inc)	Democratic	17,498	60.20%	Albert Rohland	Rep.	11,567	39.80%	29,065	5,931	
2020	Nov. 3	Steve Doyle (inc)	Democratic	19,186	52.44%	Kevin Hoyer	Rep.	16,526	45.17%	36,590	2,660	
2020	Nov. 3	Steve Doyle (inc)	Democratic	19,186	52.44%	Leroy Brown II	Ind.	868	2.37%	36,590	2,660	
2022	Nov. 8	Steve Doyle (inc)	Democratic	14,826	51.29%	Ryan Huebsch	Rep.	14,070	48.67%	28,907	756	
2024	Nov. 8	Steve Doyle (inc)	Democratic	18,436	50.29%	Ryan Huebsch	Rep.	18,219	49.70%	36,657	217	

|}
