= Mary Lou Munts =

20th century American politician

Member of the Wisconsin State Assembly
- In office January 3, 1983 – January 7, 1985
- Preceded by: Virgil Roberts
- Succeeded by: Sylvester G. Clements
- Constituency: 94th Assembly district
- In office January 1, 1973 – January 3, 1983
- Preceded by: Position established
- Succeeded by: Vernon W. Holschbach
- Constituency: 76th Assembly district

Personal details
- Born: Mary Louise Rogers; August 21, 1924 Chicago, Illinois, U.S.
- Died: December 22, 2013 (aged 89) Kennett Square, Pennsylvania, U.S.
- Party: Democratic
- Spouse: Raymond Munts (m. 1947; died 1992)
- Children: 4

Mary Louise "Mary Lou" Munts (née Rogers; August 21, 1924 – December 22, 2013) was an American lawyer, economist, and Democratic politician from Madison, Wisconsin. She served 12 years in the Wisconsin State Assembly, representing Madison's south side.

== Biography ==
Born in Chicago, Illinois, Munts graduated from Swarthmore College. She received her master's degree in economics from the University of Chicago and then her law degree from the University of Wisconsin Law School. From 1973 until 1985, Munts served in the Wisconsin State Assembly from Madison, Wisconsin. Munts was instrumental in securing the passage of Wisconsin's Marital Property Act (1986). In 1983m Munts became the Co-Chair of the Wisconsin Legislature's very powerful Joint Committee on Finance—the first woman to achieve that status. She retired from the Wisconsin Assembly in 1984 after being appointed to the Wisconsin Public Service Commission. In 1992, Munts was elected to the Common Cause National Governing Board and became a member of Common Cause Wisconsin shortly thereafter.

In 1984, Munts was appointed to the Public Service Commission of Wisconsin By Gov. Tony Earl (1983–87) and became chairman of the commission in 1986. In 1995, Munts became the Co-Chair of Common Cause Wisconsin with former moderate Republican strategist Bill Kraus. She advocated for stronger campaign finance reform and stronger ethics legislation—including the prosecution for felony misconduct in public office of Wisconsin legislative leaders Scott Jensen (R), Chuck Chvala (D), Brian Burke(D), and Steven Foti (R) during the infamous 2001-2002 Wisconsin Legislative Caucus Scandal. She retired from the CC/WI Board in 2005. Mary Lou Munts is remembered as one of the most effective and admired Dane County state legislators and public figures. And, as Co-chair of Common Cause in Wisconsin, as one of Wisconsin's leading political reform advocates. Munts died on December 22, 2013, in Kennett Square, Pennsylvania.
