= Farmington, La Crosse County, Wisconsin =

Farmington, Wisconsin
- Town
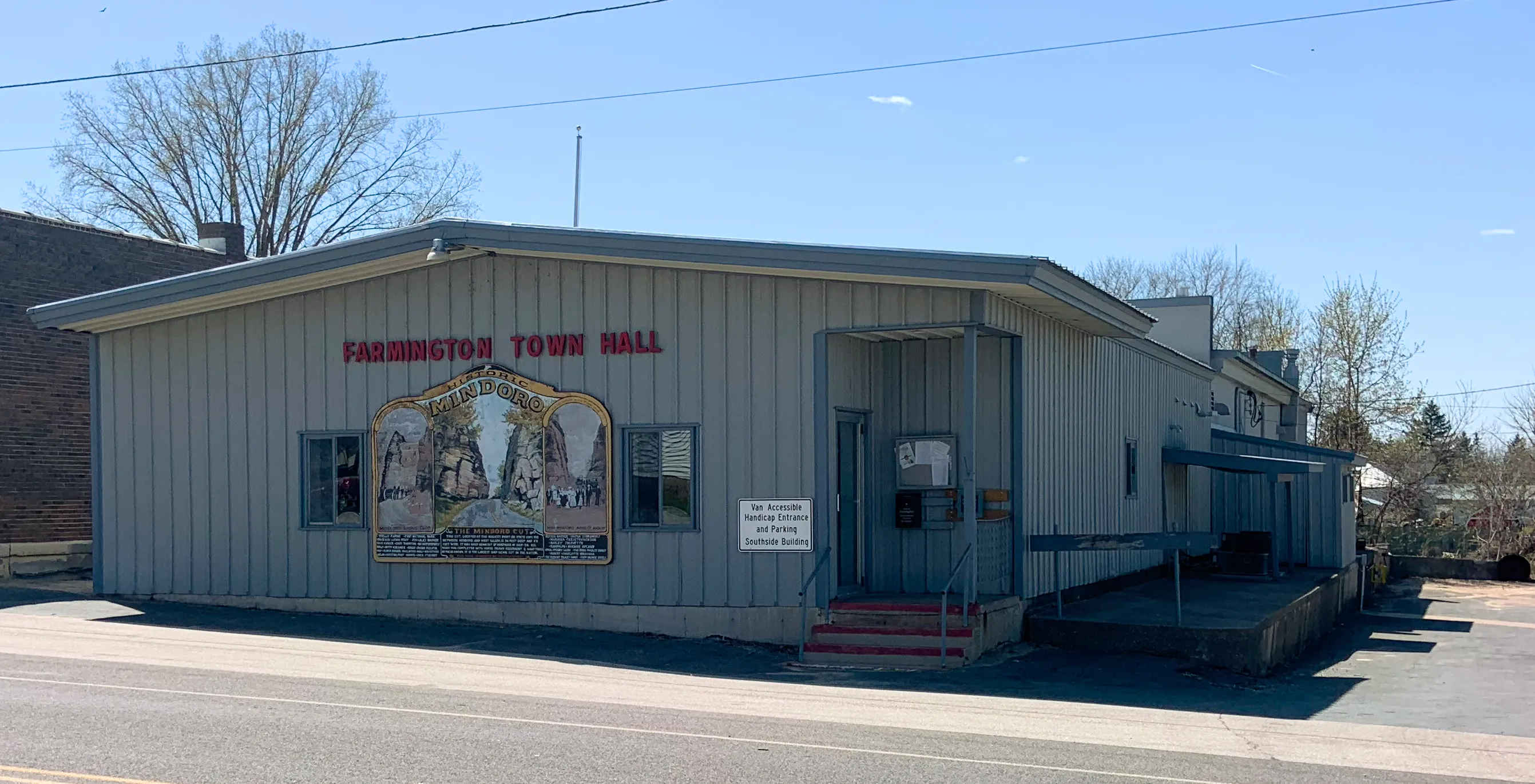
- Farmington Town Hall in Mindoro

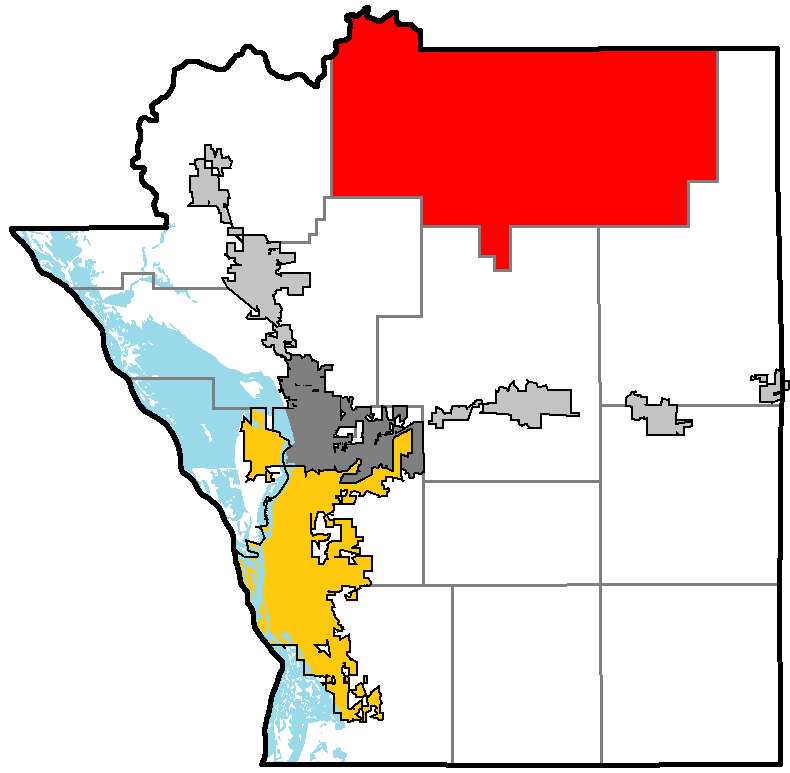
- Location of Farmington, La Crosse County

- Location of La Crosse County, Wisconsin
- Coordinates: 44°1′42″N 91°6′5″W
- Country: United States
- State: Wisconsin
- County: La Crosse

Area
  - Total: 75.5 sq mi (195.5 km^{2})
  - Land: 75.3 sq mi (195.1 km^{2})
  - Water: 0.15 sq mi (0.4 km^{2})
- Elevation: 790 ft (240 m)

Population (2020)
  - Total: 2,140
  - Density: 28.4/sq mi (11.0/km^{2})
- Time zone: UTC-6 (Central (CST))
  - Summer (DST): UTC-5 (CDT)
- ZIP Codes: 54636 (Holmen); 54644 (Mindoro)
- Area code: 608
- FIPS code: 55-063-25325
- GNIS feature ID: 1583191
- Website: www.townoffarmingtonlax.org

Farmington is a town in La Crosse County, Wisconsin, United States. The population was 2,061 at the 2010 census, up from 1,733 at the 2000 census. By the 2020 census, the population goes further up to 2,140. It is part of the La Crosse Metropolitan Statistical Area. The unincorporated communities of Burr Oak, Mindoro, and Stevenstown are in the town.

== Geography ==
Farmington is along the northern edge of La Crosse County, bordered to the north by Trempealeau, Jackson, and Monroe counties. Mindoro, the largest community, is in the center of the town, in the valley of Fleming Creek, also known as Lewis Valley. Wisconsin Highway 108 crosses the east-central part of town, leading north 9 miles (14 km) to Melrose and south the same distance to West Salem.

According to the United States Census Bureau, the town has a total area of 75.5 square miles (195.5 km^{2}), of which 75.3 square miles (195.1 km^{2}) are land and 0.2 square miles (0.4 km^{2}), or 0.22%, is water. The Black River, a tributary of the Mississippi River, forms the northwest border of the town, and Fleming Creek, a west-flowing tributary of the Black, drains most of the town's area.

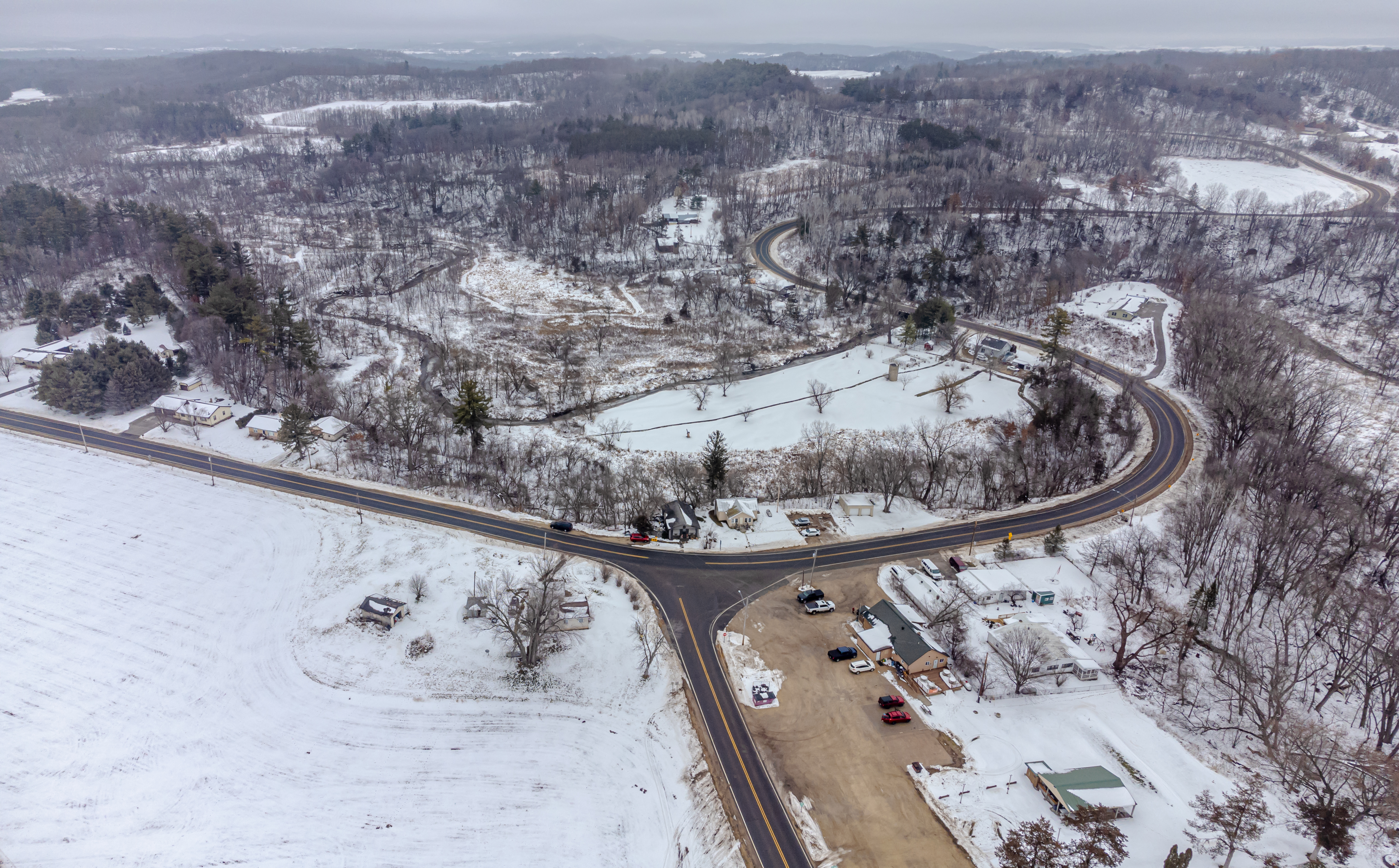
Stevenstown with Fleming Creek running through town

=== Geology ===
The Agger Rockshelter is located in the town. The Mindoro Cut is also located in the town, near Mindoro on County Trunk Highway C.

== Demographics ==
Historical population
Year	Pop.	±%
1980	1,507	—
1990	1,599	+6.1%
2000	1,733	+8.4%
2010	2,061	+18.9%

As of the census of 2000, there were 1,733 people, 664 households, and 505 families residing in the town. The population density was 23.0 people per square mile (8.9/km^{2}). There were 706 housing units at an average density of 9.4 per square mile (3.6/km^{2}). The racial makeup of the town was 97.46% White, 0.29% African American, 0.35% Native American, 0.81% Asian, 0.52% from other races, and 0.58% from two or more races. Hispanic or Latino of any race were 0.92% of the population.

There were 664 households, out of which 33.3% had children under the age of 18 living with them, 66.1% were married couples living together, 5.3% had a female householder with no husband present, and 23.9% were non-families. 18.7% of all households were made up of individuals, and 7.7% had someone living alone who was 65 years of age or older. The average household size was 2.61 and the average family size was 2.96.

In the town, the population was spread out, with 25.4% under the age of 18, 6.8% from 18 to 24, 29.8% from 25 to 44, 26.6% from 45 to 64, and 11.4% who were 65 years of age or older. The median age was 38 years. For every 100 females there were 110.3 males. For every 100 females age 18 and over, there were 106.1 males.

The median income for a household in the town was $41,477, and the median income for a family was $46,500. Males had a median income of $31,947 versus $23,250 for females. The per capita income for the town was $18,096. About 5.3% of families and 6.9% of the population were below the poverty line, including 3.8% of those under age 18 and 12.0% of those age 65 or over.
