= Steve Doyle (politician) =

American politician (born 1958)

Member of the Wisconsin State Assembly from the 94th district
- Incumbent
- Assumed office May 17, 2011
- Preceded by: Michael Huebsch

Chairman of the Board of Supervisors of La Crosse County, Wisconsin
- In office April 2002 – July 21, 2011
- Preceded by: James A. Ehrsam
- Succeeded by: Tara Johnson

Member of the Board of Supervisors of La Crosse County, Wisconsin
- Incumbent
- Assumed office April 2012
- Preceded by: Donald Bina
- Constituency: 20th district
- In office April 1986 – April 2012
- Preceded by: Charles H. Pierce
- Succeeded by: Robert Keil
- Constituency: 28th district

Personal details
- Born: May 21, 1958 (age 68) La Crosse, Wisconsin, U.S.
- Party: Democratic
- Spouse: Gloria L. Wicker (m. 1987)
- Children: 2
- Education: University of Wisconsin–La Crosse (BS); University of Wisconsin Law School (JD)
- Profession: lawyer, legislator
- Website: Official website

Steven Patrick Doyle (born May 21, 1958) is an American lawyer and Democratic politician from La Crosse County, Wisconsin. He is a member of the Wisconsin State Assembly, representing the 94th Assembly district since May 2011. He is also a member of the La Crosse County Board of Supervisors—since 1986—and was chairman of the board from 2002 through 2011.

== Early life and career ==
Steve Doyle was born and raised in La Crosse, Wisconsin. He graduated from La Crosse's Aquinas High School in 1976 and went on to the University of Wisconsin–La Crosse, where he earned his bachelor's degree in 1980, majoring in public administration and political science. After graduating, Doyle served an internship in the Washington, D.C., office of U.S. representative Alvin Baldus, then remained as a staffer for Baldus until he left office in January 1981.

Returning to Wisconsin, Doyle entered the University of Wisconsin Law School in Madison, Wisconsin, and began working as a full time legislative aide in the Wisconsin Legislature for state representative Joseph Andrea (D–Kenosha). He completed his J.D. in 1986. Doyle practices law in La Crosse, specializing in family law and mediation. He also taught local and state government and the American legal system at the University of Wisconsin–La Crosse.

== Political career ==
While still attending law school, Doyle made his first run for Wisconsin State Assembly in 1984. Doyle sought to succeed state representative Virgil Roberts, who was vacating his seat to run for state Senate. (Note: In the 1983–1984 term Virgil Roberts represented the 35th district, but a redistricting act in 1983 replaced that district with the 94th with slightly different borders.) In 1984, Wisconsin's 94th Assembly district comprised most of La Crosse County—excluding the city of La Crosse—and also included the southwest quarter of neighboring Monroe County. Doyle faced two opponents in the Democratic Party primary—truck driver Karl Krueger and former school board member Donald Bina. Doyle prevailed in the primary, taking 46% of the vote, and went on to a general election against La Crosse County supervisor Sylvester G. Clements. Doyle lost the general election by 769 votes, taking 48% of the vote.

A year later, Doyle entered the race for a seat on the La Crosse County Board of Supervisors, and won the seat at the 1986 Spring election. That summer, he declared another run for Wisconsin State Assembly, seeking a rematch with Clements. At the primary, however, former state representative Virgil Roberts—who had lost his election for state Senate in 1984—returned to run again for his former Assembly seat. Doyle lost the primary to Roberts, but received a respectable 45% of the vote.

Doyle has continued as a member of the county board of supervisors up to the present. He was elected chairman of the board of supervisors in 2002 and continued until resigning his chairmanship after his election to the Assembly in 2011.

On May 3, 2011, Doyle was elected to the Assembly in a special election to replace Republican Michael Huebsch. Doyle defeated John Lautz 54% to 46%. He has been re-elected seven times and, most recently, defeated Michael Huebsch's son, Ryan, in the 2024 general election.

== Personal life and family ==
Steven Doyle is one of six children born to Patrick and Elaine (née Herman) Doyle. Steve's parents were small business owners, running the electronics store Doyle T.V. for more than 40 years.

Steve Doyle married Gloria Lynne Wicker on August 8, 1987. They have two adult daughters and reside in Onalaska, Wisconsin. In their private time, the Doyles raise alpacas.

== Electoral history ==
=== Wisconsin Assembly (1984, 1986) ===
Year	Election	Date	Elected				Defeated				Total	Plurality
1984	Primary	Sep. 11	Steven P. Doyle	Democratic	1,150	45.89%	Donald Bina	Dem.	879	35.08%	2,506	271
1984	Primary	Sep. 11	Steven P. Doyle	Democratic	1,150	45.89%	Karl E. Krueger	Dem.	477	19.03%	2,506	271
1984	General	Nov. 6	Sylvester G. Clements	Republican	10,959	51.82%	Steven P. Doyle	Dem.	10,190	48.18%	21,149	769
1986	Primary	Sep. 9	Virgil Roberts	Democratic	1,280	55.12%	Steven P. Doyle	Dem.	1,042	44.88%	2,322	238

=== Wisconsin Assembly (2011–present) ===
Year	Election	Date	Elected				Defeated				Total	Plurality
2011	Primary	Apr. 7	Steve Doyle	Democratic	4,699	53.64%	Cheryl A. Hancock	Dem.	4,059	46.33%	8,761	640
2011	Special	May 3	Steve Doyle	Democratic	8,369	53.66%	John Lautz	Rep.	7,219	46.29%	15,596	1,150
2012	General	Nov. 6	Steve Doyle (inc)	Democratic	18,566	60.59%	Bruce Evers	Rep.	12,068	39.38%	30,644	6,498
2014	General	Nov. 4	Steve Doyle (inc)	Democratic	13,670	54.06%	Tracie Happel	Rep.	11,617	45.94%	25,287	2,053
2016	General	Nov. 8	Steve Doyle (inc)	Democratic	16,721	52.63%	Julian Bradley	Rep.	15,049	47.37%	31,770	1,672
2018	General	Nov. 6	Steve Doyle (inc)	Democratic	17,498	60.20%	Albert Rohland	Rep.	11,567	39.80%	29,065	5,931
2020	General	Nov. 3	Steve Doyle (inc)	Democratic	19,186	52.44%	Kevin Hoyer	Rep.	16,526	45.17%	36,590	2,660
2020	General	Nov. 3	Steve Doyle (inc)	Democratic	19,186	52.44%	Leroy Brown II	Ind.	868	2.37%	36,590	2,660
2022	General	Nov. 8	Steve Doyle (inc)	Democratic	14,826	51.29%	Ryan Huebsch	Rep.	14,070	48.67%	28,907	756
2024	General	Nov. 5	Steve Doyle (inc)	Democratic	18,436	50.29%	Ryan Huebsch	Rep.	18,219	49.70%	36,657	217

== Notes ==
Wisconsin State Assembly
Preceded by Michael Huebsch	Member of the Wisconsin State Assembly from the 94th district May 17, 2011 – present	Incumbent
