= Tainter Cave =

- U.S. National Register of Historic Places
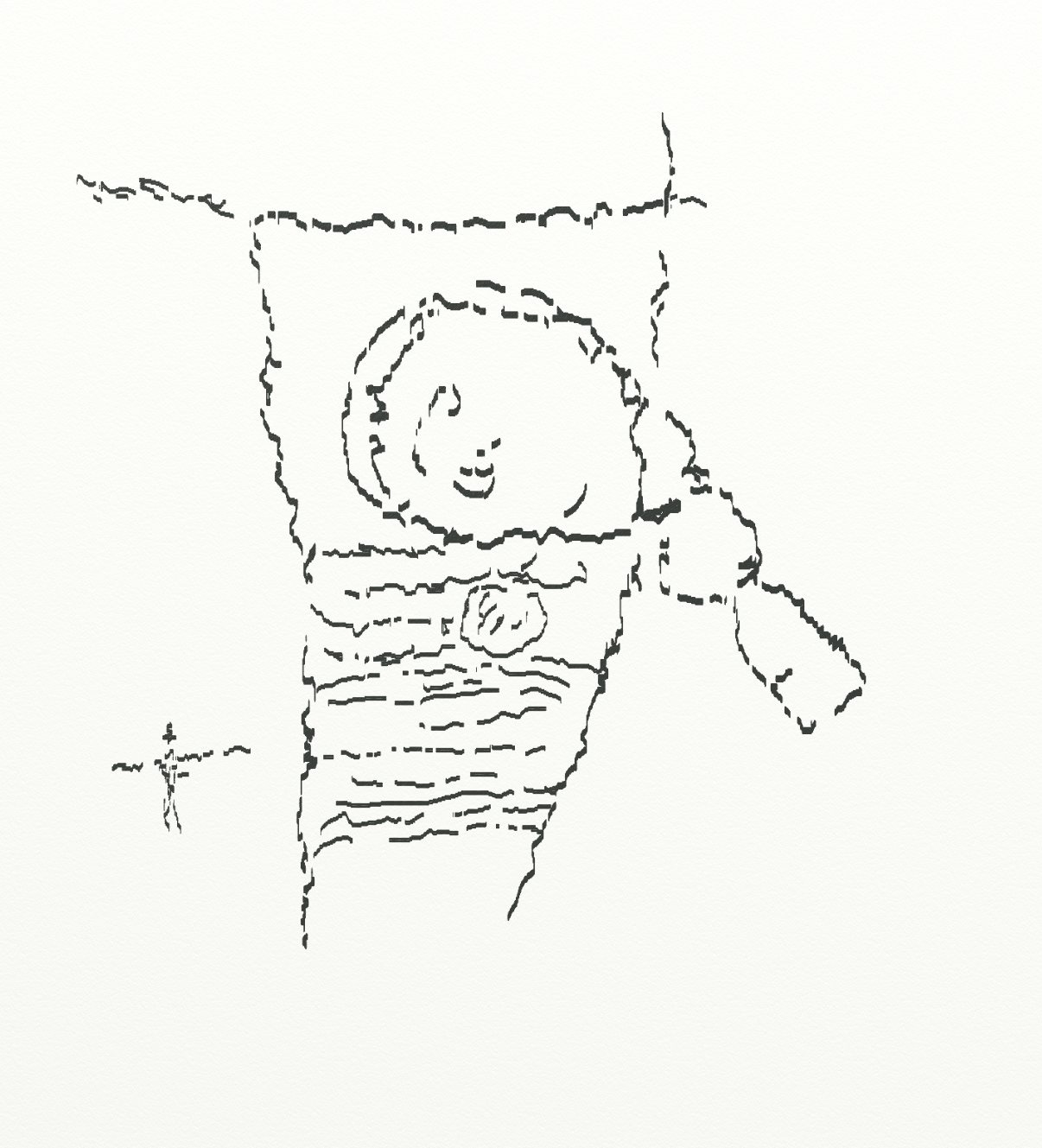
- Tracing of a pictograph from inside the cave's entrance. Robert F. Boszhardt posits this may represent a baby on a cradleboard.
- Nearest city: Clayton, Crawford County, Wisconsin
- NRHP reference No.: 01000106
- Added to NRHP: May 8, 2001

Tainter Cave, also known as Tombstone Cave, is a dry sandstone cave in Crawford County, Wisconsin, in which prehistoric Native Americans carved petroglyphs and drew pictographs, including birds, men, deer, and abstract designs. With over 100 pictographs, the cave holds more than any other known site in Wisconsin. It is also notable as the first archaeological site recorded in the dark zone of a cave in the Upper Midwest.

== Description and discovery ==
The cave is in a layer of St. Peter Sandstone near the top of a ridge in the Driftless Area. From the entrance on the east-facing side of the ridge, it penetrates over 175 feet to the southwest. The front of the first chamber is lit by natural light from the opening; the two chambers behind it are pitch black. The ceiling is generally low, requiring one to crawl or stoop.

The cave had been known to locals and cavers for many years. In 1967 it was mapped by the Wisconsin Speleological Society under the name "Tombstone Cave." In 1993 local cave enthusiast Daniel Arnold wrote to the Mississippi Valley Archaeological Center that the cave had a diamond-shaped carving near the entrance, interesting historic carvings, drawings of animals and human figures, with birch torches on the floor. Professional archaeologists visited in 1998 and determined that many of the images among the graffiti were probably made by prehistoric Native Americans. The cave was listed on the National Register of Historic Places in 2001.

== Chamber One ==
The entrance is a long horizontal crack, 35 feet across and four feet tall at the highest. Inside, the first chamber is about 60 feet deep, with slabs of rock fallen from the ceiling to the floor in places. Among the clearly modern graffiti are some carvings which are almost certainly Native American. There is a carved diamond with a dot in its center, similar to designs at the Viola Rockshelter, Bell Coulee Shelter, and other sites in the region. A line-drawing of a headless bird is carved near the bottom of a boulder.

On the ceiling inside the entrance, a panel of drawings shows a human figure with lines across the body – possibly a baby bundled on a cradleboard - with a line almost connecting it to a speckled bird. If it is a baby, the composition of baby connected to bird could represent a naming ceremony.

On the south wall are more drawings, including a deer or elk with a filled-in body and with forward-curving antlers. A sample of its pigment has been AMS-dated to within 60 years of 690 A.D., placing the artist in the Late Woodland period, during the time effigy mounds were being built. The style of the antlers is not seen elsewhere for this region and period.

On the west wall is a panel of drawings, including what could be depictions of spear tips and groups of abstract arcs and lines that resemble designs found elsewhere on Late Woodland pottery. A bird-like figure is high on the panel, a headless human (perhaps a shaman) in the middle, and a lizard-like creature at the bottom; the three might be deliberately arranged to represent an Upper, Middle and Lower-world.

Based on cultural materials found in the cave, it appears that people lived mainly in the first chamber, where there was some natural light. Deer bones were on the surface - many of them pulverized and partly charred - and shell fragments. Four pottery sherds were found - thin-walled and grit-tempered. The style of one matches examples of Millville-phase pottery from 250-500 A.D. Two other sherds have a dentate rocker-stamped style over a cord-marked exterior, similar to late Millville/Mills sherds at other sites from 250 to 700 A.D. A piece of wood charcoal from the floor was carbon-14 dated to 535 A.D.

Charred rolls of birch bark are also scattered around the floor, mostly along the walls in chambers one and two. These were apparently lit as torches, providing light at night and for the artists working in the dark parts of the cave.

== Chamber Two ==
At the back of the first chamber in the dark is a low opening into a totally dark chamber 75 feet by 10 to 15 feet wide, with the ceiling not quite high enough to stand up. Small rock is scattered along the walls, with a large collapse halfway down the chamber.

This dark chamber has fewer pictures than the first, and some have probably fallen with sections of wall that collapsed. But low on one side-wall is a panel of arranged creatures divided by a horizontal crack. Above the crack are three stylized headless birds, three sets of rake wings, some turkey-track bird feet, and a small creature that could be a canine. Below the crack is a grouping of deer and hunters with bows. The hunters' bodies are filled in with pigment, but the squarish deer are not. Instead, three of the deer have small deer drawn inside them - probably fetal fawns. Others have simple objects inside them. Lines connect many of the hunters' bows to the deer. The hunting scene probably depicts a group hunt in late winter or early spring, and the use of bows and arrows dates the drawing at or after 500-700 A.D., when bows are believed to enter this area. Everything recognizable below the crack are earth-bound creatures, and everything above are bird-like, except for that one small canine up with the birds.

Nearby on the ceiling is the faint image in black of an animal with four stumpy legs and two long, widespread horns. The long horns look more like bison occidentalis, which went extinct about 5000 years ago, than modern bison bison, with its short horns. If the former, the artist for this drawing would be a Paleo-Indian or Archaic person.

A well-preserved part of a moccasin was found on the floor of the second chamber - a section of a sole reaching from the toe to the back of the arch, where it must have been stitched to a heel section, based on stitch-holes still there. Stitch-holes on the side indicate it was stitched to uppers, and part of an upper flap remains with laces on the right side. The thick sole appears to be a hide of bison or elk. Flecks of grass are embedded in the inside, probably for insulation. A tiny section was AMS dated to A.D. 1440. This moccasin is an unusual find - the first known archaeological moccasin in the Midwest north of the Ozarks.

== Chamber Three ==
At the end of the second chamber the roof rises into a domed room about 50 feet long and 25 feet wide, with rubble on the floor. At the back of this chamber a narrow crawlspace continues for another 15 feet to where THE END is scratched on the wall.

This dark chamber too has fewer pictures, but on the ceiling just before the crawlspace are some images partially obscured by a coat of calcium. Of note is a drawing in black of a rectangular box containing two triangles. The box appears to be pierced by a spike, and both the spike and triangles are filled with criss-cross lines. The style is unlike anything previously found.

== Importance ==
Tainter Cave has been known to locals since the 1800s and it contains extensive graffiti left from their visits. Some prehistoric images have almost certainly been lost to natural roof collapses. But many Native American drawings remain in excellent condition. Some are in styles similar to art in other places, but some are in unique styles never seen before. The floor of the cave has not been excavated, and probably contains artifacts and refuse that can yield information about the people who inhabited and visited the cave. To protect these resources, a steel gate was installed in 2000, with slats to let bats in and out, but not trespassers.

Tainter Cave showed archaeologists that deep sandstone caves could exist in the Driftless area, and they could contain rock art. Once that was established, another deep sandstone cave with drawings was found 20 miles away - Larsen Cave.

For comparison, see Samuels' Cave, a sandstone cave in La Crosse County containing drawings by prehistoric Native Americans, but where those drawings have largely been destroyed by initial-carvers and natural processes.
