= Wisconsin's 96th Assembly district =

American legislative district in western Wisconsin

Wisconsin's 96th State Assembly district
- 2024 map defined in 2023 Wisc. Act 94; 2022 map defined in Johnson v. Wisconsin Elections Commission; 2011 map was defined in 2011 Wisc. Act 43
Assemblymember
Tara Johnson; D–Shelby
since January 6, 2025 (1 years)
- Demographics: 92.13% White; 1.85% Black; 1.75% Hispanic; 2.37% Asian; 1.25% Native American; 0.07% Hawaiian/Pacific Islander
- Population (2020) • Voting age: 59,415; 46,364
- Website: Official website
- Notes: Western Wisconsin

The 96th Assembly district of Wisconsin is one of 99 districts in the Wisconsin State Assembly. Located in western Wisconsin, the district comprises all of Vernon County and part of southwest La Crosse County. It includes part of the south side of the city of La Crosse and the cities of Hillsboro, Viroqua, and Westby, along with the villages of Chaseburg, Coon Valley, Genoa, La Farge, Ontario, Readstown, and Stoddard. It also contains Wildcat Mountain State Park and Viterbo University. The district is represented by Democrat Tara Johnson, since January 2025.

The 96th Assembly district is located within Wisconsin's 32nd Senate district, along with the 94th and 95th Assembly districts.

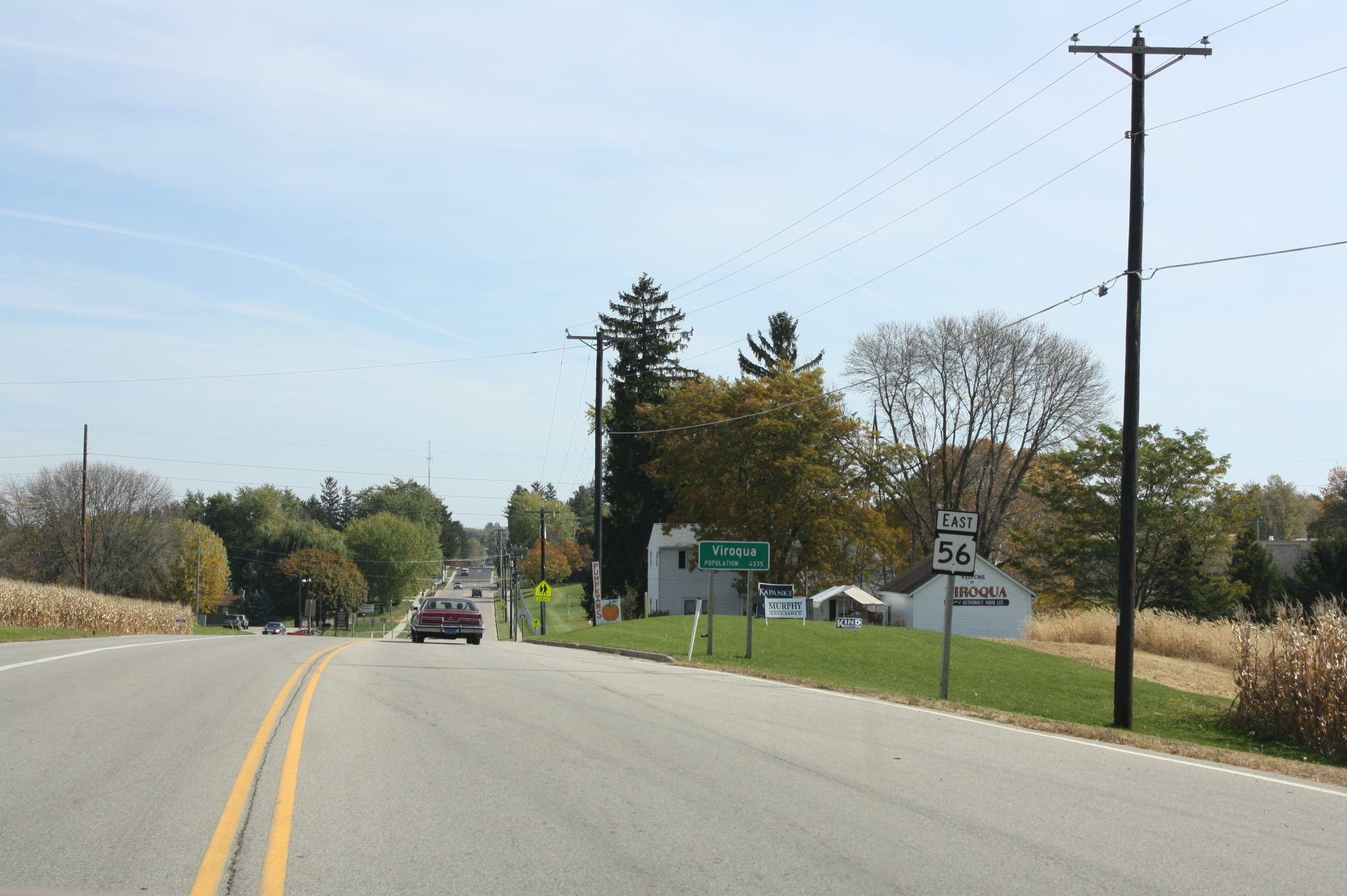
Entering Viroqua on Wisconsin Highway 56

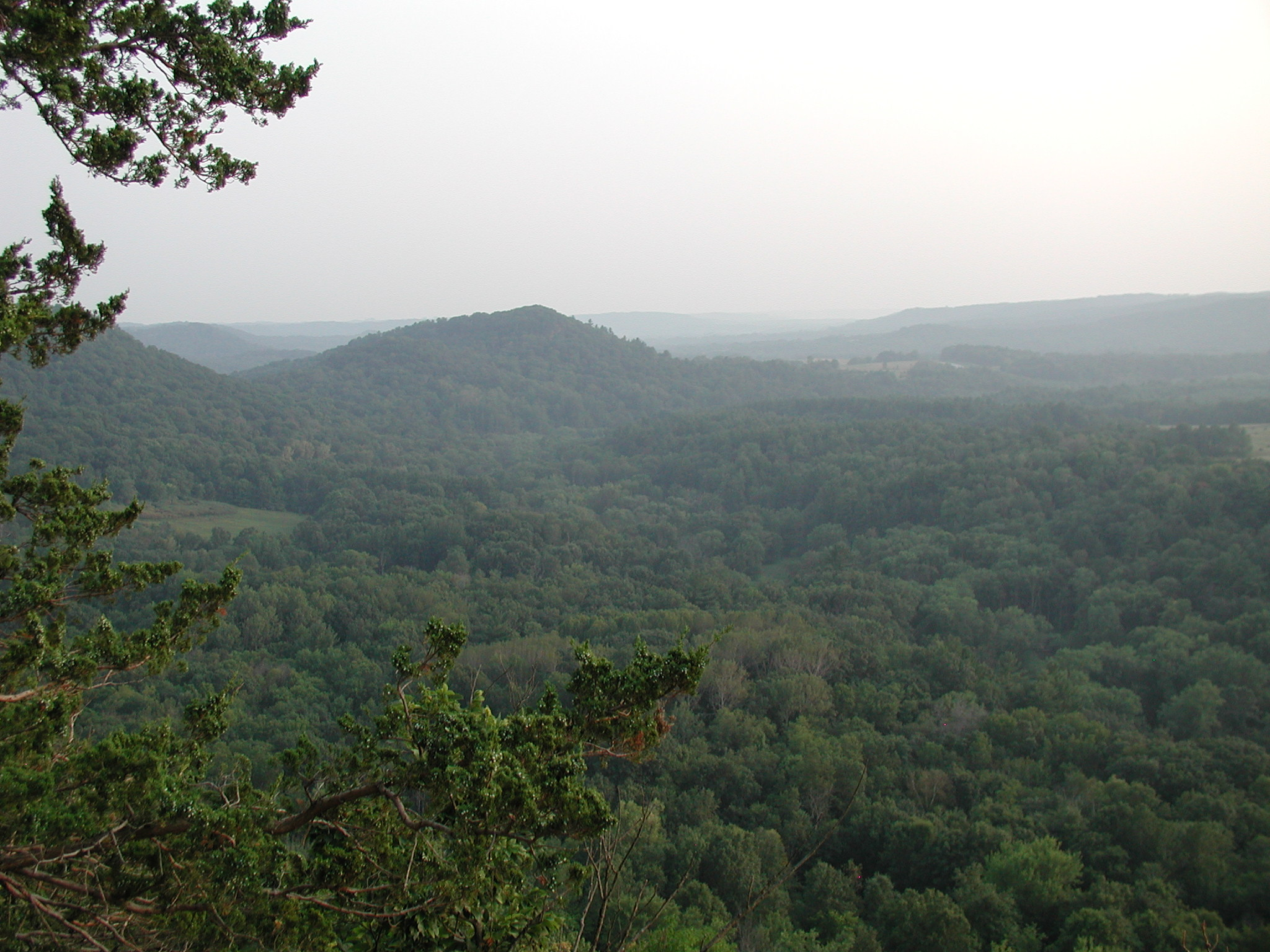
Wildcat Mountain State Park

== List of past representatives ==
List of representatives to the Wisconsin State Assembly from the 96th district
Member	Party	Residence	Counties represented	Term start	Term end	Ref.
District created
Bernard Lewison	Rep.	Viroqua	Crawford, Grant, Vernon	January 1, 1973	January 3, 1983	
David Clarenbach	Dem.	Madison	Dane	January 3, 1983	January 7, 1985	
DuWayne Johnsrud	Rep.	Eastman	Crawford, Grant, Vernon	January 7, 1985	January 3, 2005	
DuWayne Johnsrud	Rep.	Eastman	Crawford, Richland, Vernon	January 7, 1985	January 3, 2005	
DuWayne Johnsrud	Rep.	Eastman	Crawford, Monroe, Richland, Vernon	January 7, 1985	January 3, 2005	
Lee Nerison	Rep.	Westby	Crawford, Monroe, Richland, Vernon	January 3, 2005	January 7, 2019	
Lee Nerison	Rep.	Westby	Crawford, Monroe, Vernon	January 3, 2005	January 7, 2019	
Loren Oldenburg	Rep.	Viroqua	Crawford, Monroe, Vernon	January 7, 2019	January 6, 2025	
Tara Johnson	Dem.	Shelby	La Crosse, Vernon	January 6, 2025	Current	
