= Stevenstown, Wisconsin =

- Unincorporated community
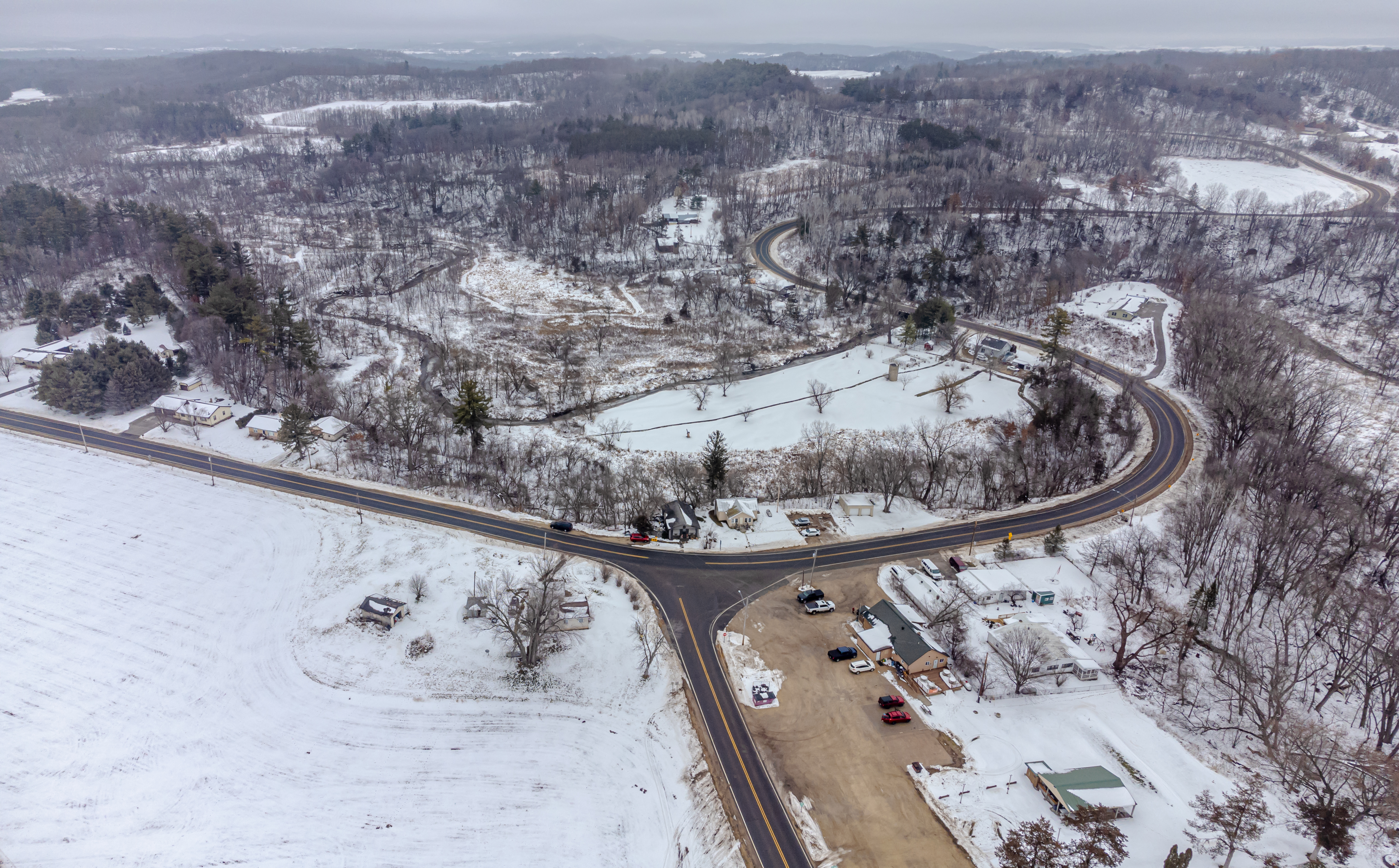
- Fleming Creek runs through town

- Location within Wisconsin Location within the United States
- Coordinates: 44°02′11″N 91°10′18″W
- Country: United States
- State: Wisconsin
- County: La Crosse
- Town: Farmington
- Elevation: 758 ft (231 m)
- Time zone: UTC-6 (Central (CST))
  - Summer (DST): UTC-5 (CDT)
- Area code: 608
- GNIS feature ID: 1574888

Stevenstown is a small unincorporated community in La Crosse County, Wisconsin, United States, in the town of Farmington. It is part of the La Crosse, Wisconsin Metropolitan Statistical Area.

== Landmarks ==
Stevenstown is notable for Agger Rockshelter, a rock shelter that was home to an ancient people, and is a farming community.
