= Mindoro, Wisconsin =

Census-designated place in Wisconsin, United States

- Census-designated place
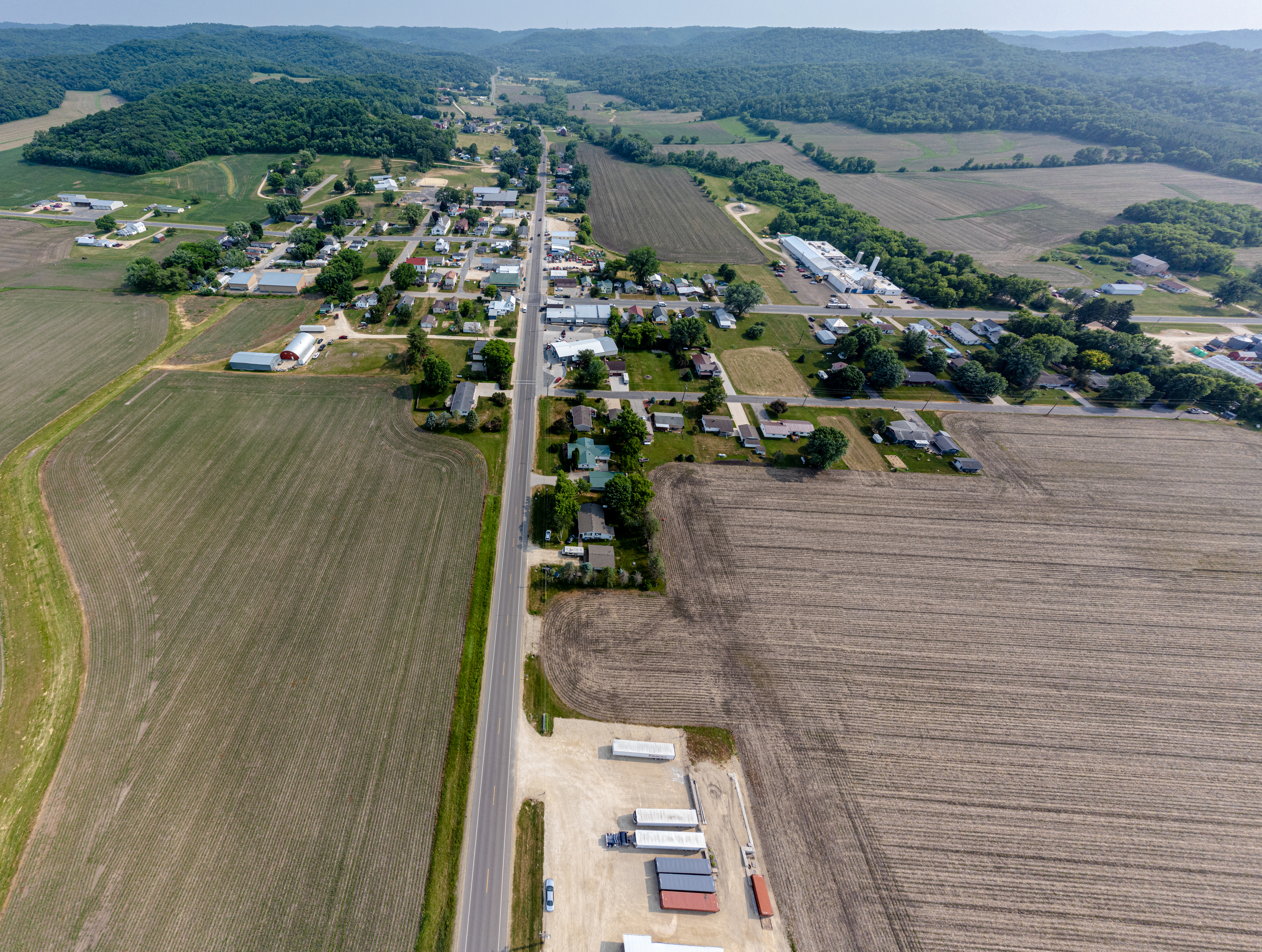
- Looking South on County C

- Location within Wisconsin Location within the United States
- Coordinates: 44°01′16″N 91°06′07″W
- Country: United States
- State: Wisconsin
- County: La Crosse
- Town: Farmington

Area
  - Total: 0.63 sq mi (1.64 km^{2})
  - Land: 0.63 sq mi (1.64 km^{2})
  - Water: 0 sq mi (0.0 km^{2})
- Elevation: 787 ft (240 m)
- Time zone: UTC-6 (Central (CST))
  - Summer (DST): UTC-5 (CDT)
- ZIP Code: 54644
- Area code: 608
- GNIS feature ID: 1569547
- FIPS code: 55-53050

Mindoro (/mɪnˈdɔːroʊ/ min-DOR-oh) is an unincorporated community and census-designated place (CDP) in La Crosse County, Wisconsin, United States, in the town of Farmington. It is part of the La Crosse Metropolitan Statistical Area. It was first listed as a CDP prior to the 2020 census. As of the 2020 census, Mindoro had a population of 291.

== Geography ==
Mindoro is in northern La Crosse County, west of the geographic center of the town of Farmington. It sits in the Lewis Valley, south of Fleming Creek, at the entrance to Severson Coulee. County Highway C passes through the community, leading south 10 miles (16 km) to West Salem and northeast 4 miles (6 km) to Burr Oak.

According to the U.S. Census Bureau, the Mindoro CDP has an area of 0.6 square miles (1.6 km^{2}), all land.

== Education ==
Mindoro, along with Melrose, Wisconsin and several other villages in the area are served by the Melrose-Mindoro Area School District.

== Landmarks ==
The Mindoro Cut is located 3.7 miles (6.0 km) south of Mindoro, on County Highway C.

The Bell Coulee Shelter, a rock shelter that was home to an ancient people, is southeast of Mindoro.

== Notable people ==
- Stanley R. Christianson, who posthumously was awarded the Medal of Honor for his role during the Korean War, was born in Mindoro
- Virgil Roberts, member of the Wisconsin State Assembly, born in Mindoro
- Gene Koss, glass artist and founder of the glass program at Tulane University, born in Mindoro

== See also ==
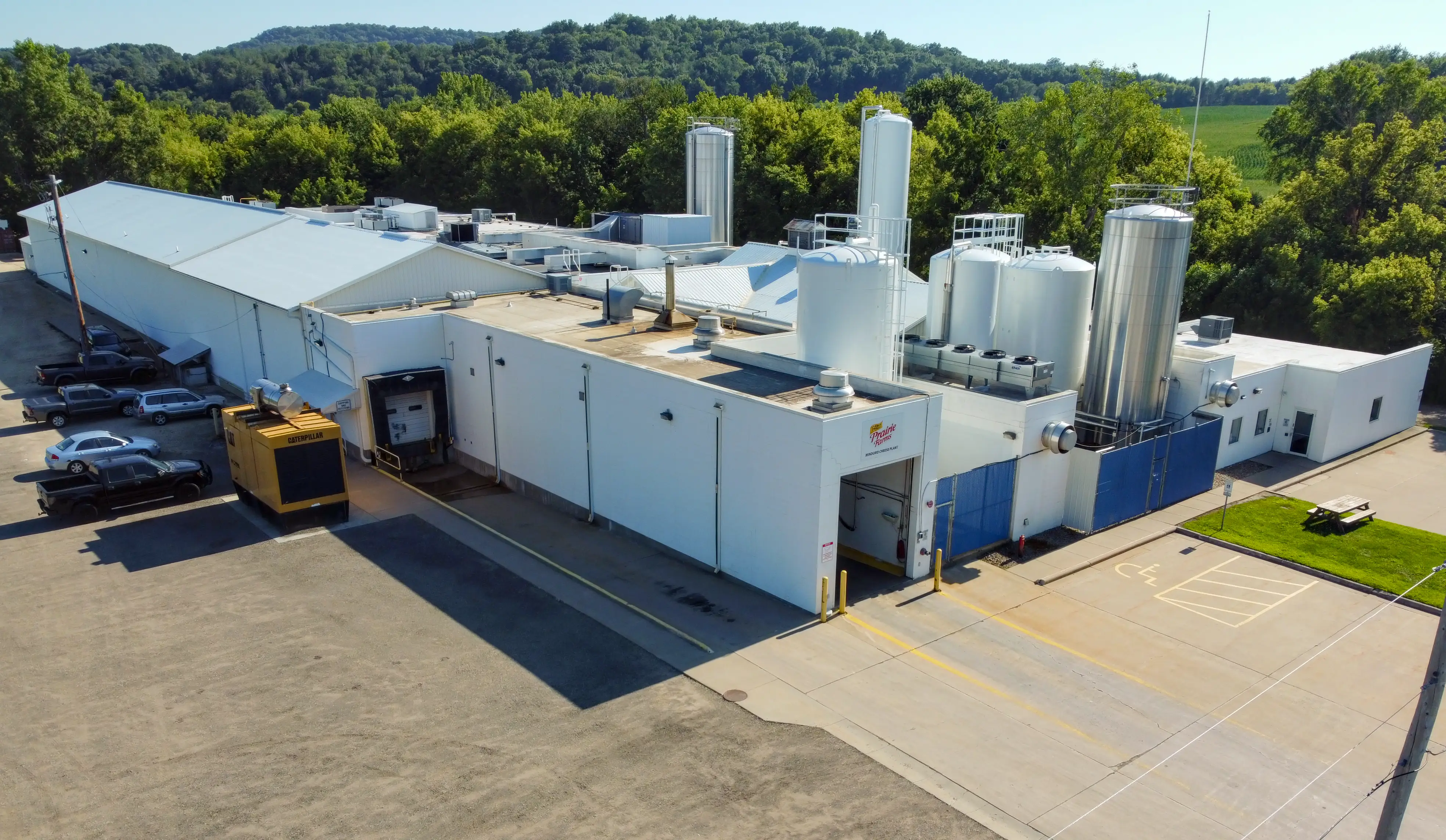
Prairie Farms factory in Mindoro

- Melrose-Mindoro High School
