= Francis E. Donoghue =

20th century American politician

Member of the Illinois House of Representatives from the 2nd district
- In office January 1907 – January 1909 Serving with Paul I. Zaabel, & Frank J. McNichols
- Preceded by: Paul I. Zaabel, Frank J. McNichols, & Frank D. Comerford
- Succeeded by: Paul I. Zaabel, Frank J. McNichols, & George L. McConnell
- In office January 1903 – January 1905 Serving with Charles W. Kopf & Benjamin F. Greenebaum
- Preceded by: Frank C. Farnum, & Augustus W. Nohe, & Francis J. Sullivan
- Succeeded by: Paul I. Zaabel, Frank J. McNichols, & Frank D. Comerford

Member of the Illinois House of Representatives from the 15th district
- In office January 1901 – January 1903 Serving with Charles W. Kopf & William J. Moran
- Preceded by: Patrick J. Meaney, Edward H. Rorig, & John Dockery
- Succeeded by: James P. Cavanagh, Peter Knolla, & Ladislas J. Fligel

Personal details
- Born: Francis Edmund Donoghue; November 27, 1873 Chicago, Illinois, U.S.
- Died: January 8, 1952 (aged 78) Augustana Hospital, Chicago, Illinois, U.S.
- Resting place: Calvary Catholic Cemetery, Evanston, Illinois
- Spouse: Mae Anson (died 1942)
- Children: Leonard Anson Donoghue^{(b. 1910; died 1992)}; Francis Edmund Donoghue^{(b. 1916; died 1997)}
- Relatives: Sheehan Donoghue (granddaughter)
- Profession: Lawyer

Francis Edmund "Frank" Donoghue (November 27, 1872 – January 8, 1952) was an American lawyer and Democratic politician from Chicago, Illinois. He served three terms in the Illinois House of Representatives, and later served 12 years as a Chicago municipal judge. He was also a co-owner of the Logan Squares Chicago City League baseball club. His brother, George Terry Donoghue, was the first general superintendent of the Chicago Park District; his granddaughter, Sheehan Donoghue, served in the Wisconsin State Assembly in the 1970s and 1980s.

== Biography ==
Francis Donoghue was born and raised in the Irish Catholic community in Chicago, Illinois. He graduated from St. Ignatius College Prep and went on to earn his law degree from Kent College in 1896. In 1900, he was elected to his first term in the Illinois House of Representatives, serving in the 42nd Illinois General Assembly. Following a 1901 redistricting, he was elected to his second term from another district in 1902, and was elected to a third term in 1906.

After leaving the House of Representatives, Donoghue became a business partner to Nixey Callahan in the ownership of the Logan Squares baseball club in the Chicago City League. The partnership lasted about five years. Donoghue subsequently worked as an attorney and dealt real estate. In 1931, he was appointed city fire attorney, and shortly thereafter he was hired as an assistant state's attorney in the office of the Cook County State's Attorney, where he remained until his election as a Chicago municipal judge, in 1938.

He served 12 years as municipal judge, retiring in 1950. He died two years later, on January 8, 1952, after a brief illness.

== Personal life and family ==
Francis Donoghue was one of eight children born to Irish American immigrant Michael Francis Donoghue and his wife Elizabeth Anne (née Shields). Michael Donoghue was a successful pioneer businessman in Chicago. Francis Donoghue's younger brother George Terry Donoghue, was the first general superintendent of the Chicago Park District, serving from its formation in 1934 until his retirement in 1960.

Francis Donoghue married Mae Anson, a daughter of Leonard Niles Anson, a pioneer businessman in Merrill, Wisconsin. They had at least two children together, she died in 1942. Their granddaughter, Sheehan Donoghue, went on to represent the Merrill area in the Wisconsin State Assembly for six terms in the 1970s and 1980s.

Illinois House of Representatives
Preceded by Patrick J. Meaney, Edward H. Rorig, & John Dockery	Member of the Illinois House of Representatives from the 15th district January 1901 – January 1903; Served alongside: Charles W. Kopf & William J. Moran	Succeeded by James P. Cavanagh, Peter Knolla, & Ladislas J. Fligel
Preceded by Frank C. Farnum, & Augustus W. Nohe, & Francis J. Sullivan	Member of the Illinois House of Representatives from the 15th district January 1903 – January 1905; Served alongside: Charles W. Kopf & Benjamin F. Greenebaum	Succeeded by Paul I. Zaabel, Frank J. McNichols, & Frank D. Comerford
Preceded by Paul I. Zaabel, Frank J. McNichols, & Frank D. Comerford	Member of the Illinois House of Representatives from the 15th district January 1903 – January 1905; Served alongside: Paul I. Zaabel, & Frank J. McNichols	Succeeded by Paul I. Zaabel, Frank J. McNichols, & George L. McConnell
