= Michael Huebsch =

American politician

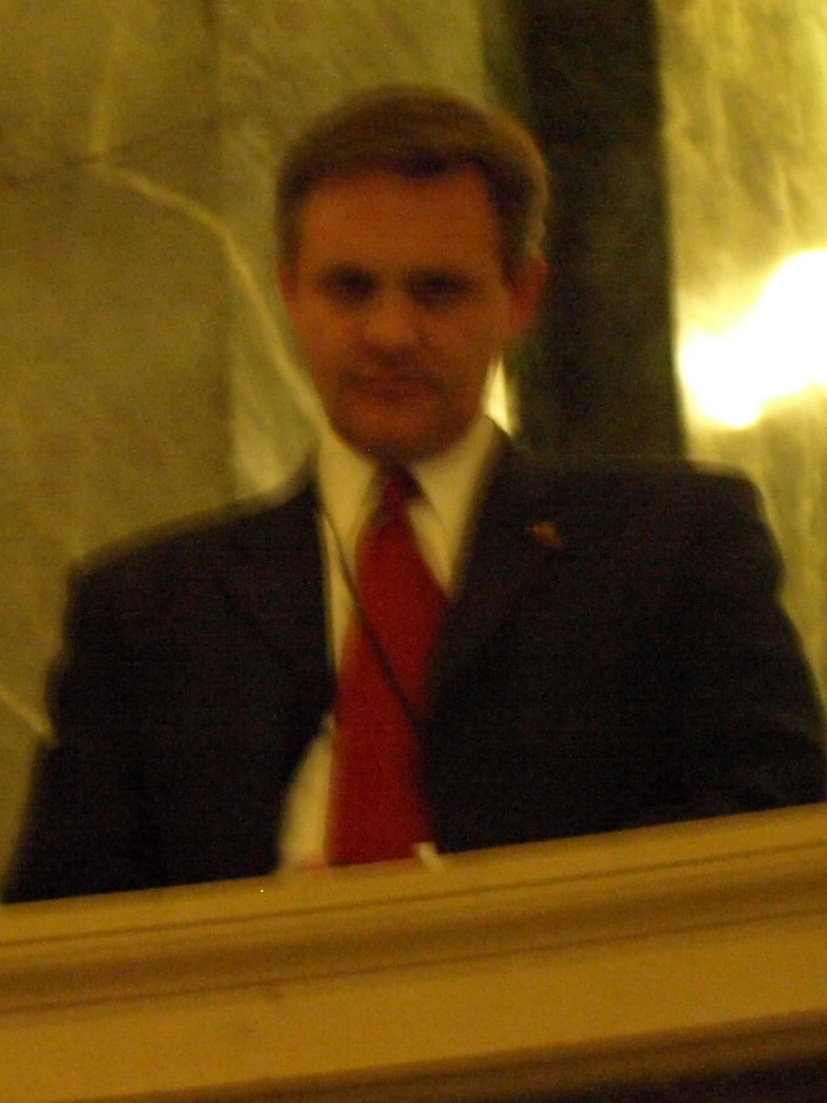
- Huebsch in 2011

15th Secretary of the Wisconsin Department of Administration
- In office January 3, 2011 – March 1, 2015
- Governor: Scott Walker
- Preceded by: Dan Schooff
- Succeeded by: Scott Neitzel

76th Speaker of the Wisconsin State Assembly
- In office January 1, 2007 – January 5, 2009
- Preceded by: John Gard
- Succeeded by: Michael J. Sheridan

Member of the Wisconsin State Assembly from the 94th district
- In office January 2, 1995 – January 3, 2011
- Preceded by: Virgil Roberts
- Succeeded by: Steve Doyle

Personal details
- Born: July 19, 1964 (age 62) Milwaukee, Wisconsin, U.S.
- Party: Republican
- Spouse: Valarie
- Children: 2
- Education: Oral Roberts University
- Profession: Politician

Michael D. "Mike" Huebsch (born July 19, 1964) is an American Republican politician from La Crosse County, Wisconsin. He was the 76th speaker of the Wisconsin State Assembly, serving a total of 16 years in the Assembly (1995–2011). He later served as the 15th secretary of the Wisconsin Department of Administration in the cabinet of Governor Scott Walker.

== Biography ==
Born in Milwaukee, Wisconsin, Huebsch graduated from Onalaska High School and attended Oral Roberts University. He served in the Wisconsin State Assembly from 1995 through 2011. From 2007 to 2009, he served as Speaker of the Assembly. Huebsch, his wife, and family live in West Salem, Wisconsin.

While in the State Assembly, he and fellow Republican representative and future governor Scott Walker were involved in the Jamyi Witch hiring controversy in 2001–02, in which they attempted to terminate the employment of state employee Jamyi Witch because of her beliefs as a Wiccan. Huebsch said that "Taxpayers shouldn't be forced to accept this hocus-pocus," proposing to delete the state appropriation which funded Witch's position. Huebsch and Walker were ultimately unsuccessful in terminating Witch's employment.

Huebsch resigned from the Assembly after Walker, having been elected governor in 2010, appointed Huebsch as Secretary of the Wisconsin Department of Administration on December 30, 2010.

In early 2015, Huebsch was appointed to the Public Service Commission of Wisconsin. He served until his resignation in February 2020.

Wisconsin State Assembly
Preceded by Virgil Roberts	Member of the Wisconsin State Assembly from the 94th district January 2, 1995 – January 3, 2011	Succeeded by Steve Doyle
Preceded by John Gard	Speaker of the Wisconsin State Assembly; January 1, 2007 – January 5, 2009	Succeeded by Michael J. Sheridan
Government offices
Preceded by Dan Schooff	Secretary of the Wisconsin Department of Administration; January 3, 2011 – March 1, 2015	Succeeded by Scott Neitzel
