= Loren Oldenburg =

American politician (born 1965)

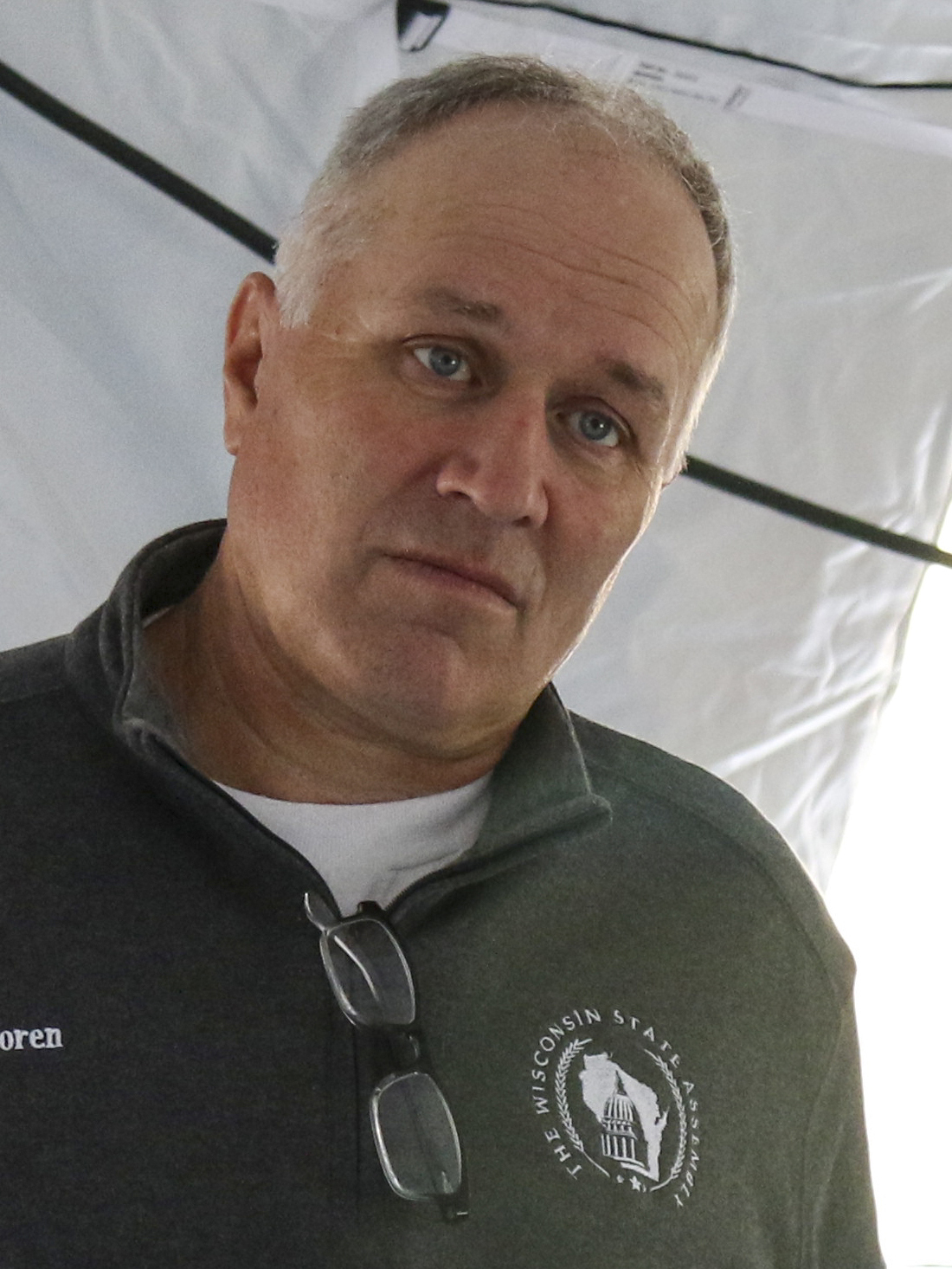

Member of the Wisconsin State Assembly from the 96th district
- In office January 7, 2019 – January 6, 2025
- Preceded by: Lee Nerison
- Succeeded by: Tara Johnson

Personal details
- Born: September 8, 1965 (age 61) Viroqua, Wisconsin, U.S.
- Party: Republican
- Spouse: Linda
- Education: University of Wisconsin–La Crosse
- Website: Official website

Loren Oldenburg (born September 8, 1965) is an American farmer and Republican politician from Vernon County, Wisconsin. He served three terms as a member of the Wisconsin State Assembly, representing Wisconsin's 96th Assembly district from 2019 to 2025. He previously served as chairman of the town board of Harmony, Vernon County, Wisconsin.

== Early life and career ==
Oldenburg was born in Viroqua, Vernon County, Wisconsin. A fourth generation farmer, he was raised and still resides on a 315-acre farm in Vernon County passed down from his great grandfather. Oldenburg graduated from Viroqua High School in 1984 and the University of Wisconsin–La Crosse.

He was active within his community, as a member and president of the Westby Cooperative Creamery, and, for the last 19 years, as a member and president of the Chaseburg Cenex Cooperative. He was elected to the Town Board of Harmony, Vernon County, and served as the Town Board chairman.

== State Assembly ==
He ran for the Wisconsin State Assembly in 2018, announcing his campaign just days after incumbent Lee Nerison announced his retirement. He was unopposed in the Republican primary and won a narrow victory over Democrat Paul Buhr in the November general election, carrying 52% of the vote.

In the Assembly, Oldenburg serves on the Committees on Consumer Protection, Energy and Utilities, Rural Development, and Workforce Development, and is vice chairman of the Committee on the Environment. He was also appointed to the Speaker's Task Force on Suicide Prevention, an issue that has become prominent in rural Wisconsin due to the increasing number of farm bankruptcies.

== Personal life and family ==
Oldenburg and his wife, Linda, reside and own the Oldenburg Centennial Farms in Vernon County, Wisconsin. They are members of the Viroqua Church of Christ.

== Electoral history ==
=== Wisconsin State Assembly (2018–present) ===
Year	Election	Date	Elected				Defeated				Total	Plurality
2018	General	Nov. 6	Loren Oldenburg	Republican	12,327	51.65%	Paul Buhr	Dem.	11,536	48.34%	23,866	791
2020	General	Nov. 3	Loren Oldenburg (inc)	Republican	16,812	56.27%	Josefine Jaynes	Dem.	13,059	43.71%	29,876	3,753
2022	General	Nov. 8	Loren Oldenburg (inc)	Republican	14,814	58.53%	Jayne M. Swiggum	Dem.	10,483	41.42%	25,308	4,331
2024	General	Nov. 5	Tara Johnson	Democratic	16,615	50.97%	Loren Oldenburg (inc)	Rep.	15,963	48.97%	32,595	652

Wisconsin State Assembly
Preceded by Lee Nerison	Member of the Wisconsin State Assembly from the 96th district January 7, 2019 – January 6, 2025	Succeeded by Tara Johnson
