= Tara Johnson =

21st century American politician

Member of the Wisconsin State Assembly from the 96th district
- Incumbent
- Assumed office January 6, 2025
- Preceded by: Loren Oldenburg

Chair of the Board of Supervisors of La Crosse County, Wisconsin
- In office July 21, 2011 – April 21, 2020
- Preceded by: Steve Doyle
- Succeeded by: Monica Kruse

Member of the La Crosse County Board of Supervisors
- In office April 2000 – April 21, 2020
- Preceded by: Lila Seager
- Succeeded by: Jamie O'Neill

Personal details
- Born: June 23, 1962 (age 64)
- Party: Democratic
- Spouses: Scott M. Finn (m. 1984; div. 1993); Timothy D. Padesky
- Children: 2
- Education: Carroll University
- Occupation: Politician
- Website: Campaign website

Tara J. Johnson (born June 23, 1962) is an American Democratic politician and retired nonprofit executive from La Crosse County, Wisconsin. She is a member of the Wisconsin State Assembly, representing Wisconsin's 96th Assembly district since 2025. She previously served as a member of the La Crosse County board of supervisors, from 2000 to 2020, and was the first female chairperson of the county board, holding that office from 2011 to 2020.

During her first marriage, she was known as Tara Johnson Finn.

== Early life and career ==
Tara Johnson graduated from Carroll University in 1984, with her bachelor's degree in German. Shortly after her college graduation, she went to work at the United Way of Greater Milwaukee. After five years, she transferred to the United Way of Brown County, Wisconsin, before becoming executive director of the United Way of the La Crosse Area in 1993. While working at the United Way, Johnson was a member of the AFSCME union, and often represented her colleagues in contract negotiations.

== Political career ==
Johnson made her first bid for public office in 2000. She sought a seat on the La Crosse County Board of Supervisors, challenging 12-year incumbent supervisor Lila Seager. Johnson didn't take issue with particular policies or votes of Seager, but offered her candidacy as a fresh perspective on the board. Johnson won the election by just 19 votes. She was subsequently re-elected nine times, serving until 2020.

=== State Senate run (2008) ===
In 2008, Johnson ran for Wisconsin Senate, challenging Republican incumbent Dan Kapanke in the 32nd Senate district. At the time, the 32nd Senate district comprised all of La Crosse, Crawford, and Vernon counties, along with the southern half of Monroe County and parts of northwest Richland County. The 32nd Senate district was one of the mostly hotly contested legislative races in the state that year; Johnson fell 2,507 votes short of Kapanke.

=== County board chair (2011–2020) ===
In 2011, La Crosse County board chair Steve Doyle was elected to the Wisconsin State Assembly and subsequently resigned the chair. Johnson was elected to succeed him, and became the first female chair of the La Crosse County board. She continued as chair until leaving office in April 2020.

=== U.S. House bid (2023–2024) ===
In the fall of 2023, Johnson announced that she would run for United States House of Representatives in Wisconsin's 3rd congressional district. At the time, she was the third Democrat to enter the race, seeking the party's nomination to challenge first term incumbent Republican Derrick Van Orden. A fourth Democrat, state representative Katrina Shankland, soon joined the race; Johnson opted to withdraw from the race after her father's death in January 2024.

=== State Assembly (2024) ===
Johnson's plans changed again two months later, after the legislature was forced to adopt a new redistricting act due to the Wisconsin Supreme Court striking down the previous decade-old Republican gerrymander. The La Crosse area was significantly impacted by the redistricting. The city of La Crosse, which had been entirely packed into the 95th Assembly district, was unpacked into the 94th, 95th, and 96th districts, creating three competitive but Democratic-leaning seats. The new 96th Assembly district comprised nearly all of Vernon County, along with the southwest corner of La Crosse County, including Johnson's hometown, Shelby.

Johnson was the first candidate to declare her candidacy for the seat, in March 2024. She was soon joined by Viroqua businessman and political newcomer Steven Campbell, setting up a contested Democratic primary. In the primary, Johnson emphasized her 20 years of experience on the county board, working in collaboration with the legislature and local governments. She won the primary in a landslide, taking 74% of the vote, and went on to face Republican incumbent Loren Oldenburg. Johnson narrowly defeated Oldenburg in the general election, receiving 51% of the vote. Johnson's victory won Democrats the district for the first time since 1985. She took office in January 2025.

== Personal life and family ==
Tara Johnson took the last name Finn when she married Scott Finn in 1984. They were married for nine years before divorcing in 1993. Tara subsequently returned to her maiden name before marrying Timothy Padesky, a union electrician. Johnson resides with her husband in the town of Shelby, Wisconsin, just outside of La Crosse; they have two adult children.

== Electoral history ==
=== Wisconsin Senate (2008) ===
Year	Election	Date	Elected				Defeated				Total	Plurality
2008	General	Nov. 4	Dan Kapanke (inc)	Republican	45,154	51.38%	Tara Johnson	Dem.	42,647	48.53%	87,881	2,507

=== Wisconsin Assembly (2024) ===
Year	Election	Date	Elected				Defeated				Total	Plurality
2024	Primary	Aug. 13	Tara Johnson	Democratic	6,391	74.14%	Steven Campbell	Dem.	2,226	25.82%	8,620	4,165
2024	General	Nov. 5	Tara Johnson	Democratic	16,615	50.97%	Loren Oldenburg (inc)	Rep.	15,963	48.97%	32,595	652

Wisconsin State Assembly
Preceded by Loren Oldenburg	Member of the Wisconsin State Assembly from the 96th district January 6, 2025 – present	Incumbent
Political offices
Preceded by Steve Doyle	Chair of the Board of Supervisors of La Crosse County, Wisconsin; July 21, 2011 – April 21, 2020	Succeeded by Monica Kruse
