= James F. Rooney =

American politician (1935–2025)

Chairman of the Wisconsin Waterways Commission
- In office September 26, 1985 – March 1, 2019
- Governor: Tony Earl; Tommy Thompson; Scott McCallum; Jim Doyle; Scott Walker; Tony Evers
- Preceded by: Francis Murphy
- Succeeded by: Roger Walsh

Member of the Wisconsin State Assembly
- In office January 3, 1983 – January 7, 1985
- Preceded by: John Plewa
- Succeeded by: Tim Carpenter
- Constituency: 20th district
- In office January 1, 1973 – January 3, 1983
- Preceded by: District established
- Succeeded by: Sheehan Donoghue
- Constituency: 61st district

Chairman of the Racine County Board of Supervisors
- In office April 20, 1982 – December 1984
- Preceded by: Elwood E. Hoeppner
- Succeeded by: Hubert Braun

Member of the Racine County Board of Supervisors from the 4th district
- In office April 20, 1998 – April 2000
- Preceded by: Patrick Verbeten
- Succeeded by: Kenneth Lumpkin
- In office April 19, 1966 – December 1984
- Preceded by: Raymond Fay
- Succeeded by: Herman F. Luedtke

Personal details
- Born: September 29, 1935 Racine, Wisconsin, U.S.
- Died: May 3, 2025 (aged 89) Mount Pleasant, Wisconsin, U.S.
- Party: Democratic
- Spouse: Nancy Lee Schultz
- Children: 4
- Occupation: politician, administrator

Military service
- Allegiance: United States
- Branch/service: United States Army
- Years of service: 1954–1956
- Rank: Private First Class

James Francis Rooney (September 29, 1935 – May 3, 2025) was an American public administrator and Democratic politician from Racine, Wisconsin. He represented Racine for 12 years in the Wisconsin State Assembly, from 1973 to 1985, and served in Racine County government for nearly 30 years. After leaving the Assembly, Rooney served another 24 years as chairman of the Wisconsin Waterways Commission (1985–2019) and was one of the key architects of Racine's lakefront revitalization. He served as chairman of the Racine Harbor Commission from 1970 to 2013, and remained on the commission until his retirement in 2019.

== Early life and career ==
Rooney was born in Racine, Wisconsin, and graduated from Racine's St. Catherine's High School in 1953. He was drafted into the United States Army in 1954, and served two years stationed at Fort Eustis, Virginia. He was employed as a surveyor and later business manager for many years for Nielsen & Madsen, an engineering consulting partnership in Racine.

== Public service ==
In 1966, Rooney made his first attempt at elected office, when he was elected to the Racine County Board of Supervisors with the endorsement of outgoing supervisor, Herman Luedtke. He was reelected nine times, serving concurrent with his Assembly career. At the start of the 1982 session, he was elected chairman of the County Board. He served as chairman until resigning from the board in December 1984. In 1970, he was also named Racine Harbor Commissioner, a position he held until 2019.

In 1972, Rooney ran for the Wisconsin State Assembly in the newly drawn 61st State Assembly district. The 61st district, covering northern Racine and the villages of Wind Point and North Bay, was drawn roughly in line with the former 2nd Racine County Assembly district, which had been occupied by Democrat Manny S. Brown since 1965. Brown did not run for election in the new seat, but Rooney did face an opponent in the Democratic primary—former radio news director John Flanagan. Rooney prevailed in the primary, and carried 56% of the general election vote in November over Republican Thomas C. Mortenson. He was subsequently reelected five times, serving 12 years.

In the Assembly, Rooney served for his entire legislative career on the Highways Committee, and served on the committees on Financial Institutions and Insurance, on Consumer and Commercial Credit, and on Insurance, Cooperatives and Risk Management. For the 1983–1984 session, he was elected Democratic caucus chairman. His most consequential legislative act was likely the creation of the Wisconsin Waterways Commission (1977 Wisc. Act 274). The law diverted a small percentage of the state gas tax for highway funding to be utilized for harbor and river improvements, including the harbor and lakefront projects that Rooney championed in Racine County.

In June 1984, Rooney announced he would seek appointment to the county highway commissioner job rather than running for reelection to the Assembly. In December 1984, he received the appointment from county executive Leonard Ziolkowski, received unanimous approval from the County Board, and resigned his seat on the County Board. Rooney served as highway commissioner until 1988, when he was appointed county public works commissioner, where he remained until retiring in 1994.

Concurrent with this service, in 1985, Governor Tony Earl appointed Rooney to chair the Wisconsin Waterways Commission, which he had largely been responsible for creating in 1977. Rooney had been critical of previous governors' appointments to the commission, which lacked representation from southeast lakefront communities which failed to prioritize improvements on Lake Michigan; with the support of Governor Earl and State Representative Jeffrey A. Neubauer, Rooney quickly began allocating grant money to Racine lakeshore improvements. Rooney was reappointed by governors Tommy Thompson, Jim Doyle, and Scott Walker and continued to serve as chairman of the commission until March 2019.

In 1998, Rooney returned to politics, narrowly winning another term on the County Board of Supervisors over local newspaper publisher Ken Lumpkin. In this term he served alongside his son, James C. Rooney. Rooney was defeated seeking reelection in 2000, in a rematch of his 1998 election.

A 2015 event on Racine's waterfront celebrated the completion of numerous harbor and lakefront projects and honored Rooney for his decades of service on the lakefront improvements. The event was co-hosted by Racine County Executive Jonathan Delagrave and Racine Mayor John Dickert. Delagrave remarked, "Racine's Lakefront, Marina and breakwater area are irreplaceable resources forour city and our county as a whole. I applaud and am thankful for the passion and dedication of all those involved, especially the persistence and vision of Jim Rooney."

Rooney served as chairman of the Racine Harbor Commission until 2013, a position he held since 1970. He ultimately retired from the commission in 2019.

== Personal life and death ==
James Rooney was a fourth generation Racinian—his great grandparents settled on Racine's north side in the 1850s, his grandfather was president of the local painter's union, and his father was President of the Racine City Council.

James Rooney and his wife, Nancy, have four adult children and still resided in Racine. Rooney was an avid sailor and owned two boats, he has been a member of the Racine Yacht Club for nearly 50 years, and was a member of the Kiwanis Club of Greater Racine.

Rooney died in Mount Pleasant, Wisconsin on May 3, 2025, at the age of 89.

== Electoral history ==
=== Wisconsin Assembly, 61st district (1972–1980) ===
Year	Election	Date	Elected				Defeated				Total	Plurality
1972	Primary	Sep. 12	James F. Rooney	Democratic	2,333	59.29%	John A. Flanagan	Dem.	1,344	34.16%	3,935	989
1972	Primary	Sep. 12	James F. Rooney	Democratic	2,333	59.29%	Curtis E. Sahakian	Dem.	258	6.56%	3,935	989
1972	General	Nov. 7	James F. Rooney	Democratic	9,261	56.39%	Thomas C. Mortenson	Rep.	7,162	43.61%	16,423	2,099
1974	Primary	Sep. 10	James F. Rooney (inc.)	Democratic	2,898	54.89%	Betty S. Rowley	Dem.	2,382	45.11%	5,280	516
1974	General	Nov. 5	James F. Rooney (inc.)	Democratic	5,881	57.82%	Anita M. Hunt	Rep.	4,291	42.18%	10,172	1,590
1976	General	Nov. 2	James F. Rooney (inc.)	Democratic	12,309	94.72%	Gary Pederson	Amer.	686	5.28%	12,995	11,623
1978	General	Nov. 7	James F. Rooney (inc.)	Democratic	7,911	68.88%	Gary Pederson	Rep.	3,575	31.12%	11,486	4,336
1980	General	Nov. 4	James F. Rooney (inc.)	Democratic	10,724	65.06%	Earl W. Bell	Rep.	5,758	34.94%	16,482	4,966

=== Wisconsin Assembly, 20th district (1982) ===
Year	Election	Date	Elected				Defeated				Total	Plurality
1982	General	Nov. 2	James F. Rooney	Democratic	10,393	73.84%	Hall L. Hardy	Rep.	3,682	26.16%	14,075	6,711

=== Racine County Board (1998–2000) ===
Year	Election	Date	Elected				Defeated				Total	Plurality
1998	General	Apr. 7	James F. Rooney	Democratic	174	50.73%	Kenneth Lumpkin	Dem.	169	49.27%	343	5
2000	General	Apr. 4	Kenneth Lumpkin	Democratic	222	52.36%	James F. Rooney (inc.)	Dem.	202	47.64%	424	20

Wisconsin State Assembly
New district	Member of the Wisconsin State Assembly from the 61st district January 1, 1973 – January 3, 1983	Succeeded by Sheehan Donoghue
Preceded by John Plewa	Member of the Wisconsin State Assembly from the 20th district January 3, 1983 – January 7, 1985	Succeeded by Tim Carpenter
Government offices
Preceded by Francis Murphy	Chairman of the Wisconsin Waterways Commission; September 26, 1985 – March 1, 2019	Succeeded by Roger Walsh
