= Jamyi Witch hiring controversy =

In 2001–2002 several Republican state representatives in Wisconsin objected to the hiring of Jamyi Witch, a Wiccan, as a prison chaplain. The objection to the hiring was led by Michael Huebsch and later joined by Scott Walker who was then a state representative.

== Genesis of issue ==
In December 2001, Mike Huebsch began leading efforts to block the funding for Witch's $32,500-a-year position. He stated taxpayers "shouldn't be forced to accept this hocus-pocus." The legislators had learned that Wisconsin Department of Corrections had recently hired Rev. Jamyi Witch as a prison chaplain at the Waupun Correctional Institution in Waupun, Wisconsin. Witch, who had volunteered for two years as a chaplain and had an extensive knowledge of alternative religions, had competed against nine other candidates for the civil service position and was hired as the most qualified candidate for the $32,500 per year job.

The chaplain was a practicing Wiccan and had, in fact, changed her last name to Witch in honor of her chosen religion.

== Hiring controversy ==
Huebsch and Walker objected publicly on the basis of her religion to the chaplain's hiring, saying: "Witch's hiring raises both personal and political concerns. Not only does she practice a different religion than most of the inmates – she practices a religion that actually offends people of many other faiths, including Christians, Muslims and Jews."

Huebsch and Walker threatened to launch a government investigation of the chaplain's hiring, "Taxpayers shouldn't be forced to accept this hocus-pocus," Huebsch stated. Huebsch proposed to delete the state appropriation which funded Witch's position, even though in the past he had repeatedly advocated increasing state funding for prison chaplains.

After several weeks of unwanted publicity, the chaplain began to receive calls and messages including a handful of death threats and reported that on one day alone she had received 432 emails and 76 phone messages at her home. She said the majority of the messages were strongly supportive.

== Conclusion ==
Walker and Huebsch, who had said they would draft legislation to prevent similar hirings by the state of Wisconsin, were ultimately unsuccessful in their efforts to terminate the employment of Witch, who was represented by the Wisconsin State Employees Union, founding body of the American Federation of State, County and Municipal Employees. Witch and the prison's only Muslim chaplain were subsequently excluded from the longstanding Waupun Clergy Association, which declared that it was open only to Christians.
