= Sheehan Donoghue =

20th century American politician

Member of the Wisconsin State Assembly
- In office January 3, 1983 – January 7, 1985
- Preceded by: James F. Rooney
- Succeeded by: Scott C. Fergus
- Constituency: 61st Assembly district
- In office January 1, 1973 – January 3, 1983
- Preceded by: District established
- Succeeded by: Virgil Roberts
- Constituency: 35th Assembly district

Personal details
- Born: December 13, 1943 (age 82) Hamilton, Ohio, U.S.
- Party: Republican
- Relatives: Francis E. Donoghue (grandfather)
- Education: University of Wisconsin–Madison (B.S.); University of Wisconsin Law School (J.D.)
- Profession: Lawyer, politician

Julia Sheehan Donoghue (born December 13, 1943) is a retired American lawyer and Republican politician from Merrill, Wisconsin. She was a member of the Wisconsin State Assembly for six terms, from 1973 through 1985. She later served more than a decade as a division head at the Wisconsin Department of Workforce Development. She is a granddaughter of Illinois politician and judge Francis E. Donoghue, and a descendant of Merrill pioneer Leonard Niles Anson.

== Early life and education ==
Donoghue was born on December 13, 1943, in Hamilton, Ohio. Her parents were natives of Merrill, Wisconsin, and returned there shortly after her birth. Donoghue graduated from Merrill High School in 1962 and went on to attend the University of Wisconsin–Madison, where she earned her bachelor's degree in political science in 1967.

== Political career ==
She became involved with the Republican Party of Wisconsin from a young age, and went to work as a research associate at the Republican National Committee after her college graduation. She was subsequently employed by President Richard Nixon's White House Conference on Food, Nutrition, and Health, then served as a management analyst with the New York Department of Health's bureau of lead poisoning control and preventive medicine, ultimately returning to Wisconsin in 1971.

Shortly after returning to Wisconsin, she resumed her interest in politics, and in 1972 she ran for Wisconsin State Assembly in the newly-drawn 35th Assembly district. At the time, the district comprised all of Lincoln County, most of Langlade County, and the western half of Oneida County, and no incumbent member lived within the boundaries of the new district. She defeated two opponents in the Republican primary, and went on to win the general election with 53% of the vote.

She was re-elected four times in her original district and was elected to a sixth term in what was then the 61st Assembly district after the 1982 court-ordered redistricting.

During the 1983 legislative term, she ran in a special election for Wisconsin Senate to replace Clifford Krueger, who had retired unexpectedly. She lost the election to Democrat Lloyd H. Kincaid, and the defeat caused her to re-evaluate her future. Rather than running for another term in the Assembly in 1984, Donoghue left politics and entered law school at her alma mater. She earned her J.D. from the University of Wisconsin Law School in 1987, and subsequently worked for several years as a lawyer in Walworth County, Wisconsin.

== Later years ==
In 1991, she was appointed administrator of the division of administrative services in the Wisconsin Department of Industry, Labor and Human Relations. Shortly after, she transitioned to become administrator of the department's equal rights division where she remained until her retirement.

After retiring from state government, Donoghue returned to northern Wisconsin, and still resides in rural Plum Lake, Wisconsin.

Donoghue remained vocal in politics. During the 2000 Republican Party presidential primaries, she was active in supporting the campaign of Arizona senator John McCain. In the 2012 United States Senate election in Wisconsin, she supported her former colleague Tommy Thompson. In the 2024 United States presidential election, she endorsed Democratic Party nominee Kamala Harris over Republican nominee Donald Trump, saying, "I feel that Republicans and Democrats and independents should all support Kamala Harris because we believe in the rule of law."

== Personal life and family ==
Sheehan Donoghue was one of four daughters of Leonard Anson Donoghue and his wife Julia (née Kelley) Donoghue. Leonard Anson Donoghue was the son of Francis E. Donoghue, who served in the Illinois House of Representatives and served as a municipal judge in Chicago. On his mother's side, Leonard Donoghue was a grandson of Leonard Niles Anson, who was an important pioneer of the city of Merrill, having founded the Gilkey Anson Company, organized the First National Bank of Merrill and the Lincoln County Bank, and served as mayor of Merrill in the 1890s.

Sheehan Donoghue never married, and hosted her parents in her home in their later years.

== Electoral history ==
=== Wisconsin Assembly, 35th district (1972–1980) ===
Year	Election	Date	Elected				Defeated				Total	Plurality
1972	Primary	Sep. 12	Sheehan Donoghue	Republican	3,042	43.90%	Bill L. Yoder	Rep.	2,037	29.39%	6,930	1,005
1972	Primary	Sep. 12	Sheehan Donoghue	Republican	3,042	43.90%	Phillip E. Brown	Rep.	1,851	26.71%	6,930	1,005
1972	General	Nov. 7	Sheehan Donoghue	Republican	10,438	53.27%	Patrick Nugent	Dem.	8,581	43.79%	19,596	1,857
1972	General	Nov. 7	Sheehan Donoghue	Republican	10,438	53.27%	F. Jack Shook	Amer.	577	2.94%	19,596	1,857
1974	General	Nov. 5	Sheehan Donoghue (inc)	Republican	9,341	58.30%	Gordon E. Schroeder	Dem.	6,682	41.70%	16,023	2,659
1976	General	Nov. 2	Sheehan Donoghue (inc)	Republican	12,902	58.25%	Richard W. Voss	Dem.	9,248	41.75%	22,150	3,654
1978	General	Nov. 7	Sheehan Donoghue (inc)	Republican	9,887	55.04%	Sandra Polinski	Dem.	8,076	44.96%	17,963	1,811
1980	General	Nov. 4	Sheehan Donoghue (inc)	Republican	15,642	64.25%	James V. Mabry	Dem.	8,702	35.75%	24,344	6,940

=== Wisconsin Assembly, 61st district (1982) ===
Wisconsin Assembly, 61st District Election, 1982
Party	Candidate	Votes	%	±%
General Election, November 2, 1982
Republican	Sheehan Donoghue	8,377	50.80%	
Democratic	Frank Murphy	8,112	49.20%	
Plurality		265	1.61%	-28.52%
Total votes		16,489	100.0%	+0.04%
Republican gain from Democratic				

=== Wisconsin Senate (1983) ===
Wisconsin Senate, 12th District Special Election, 1983
Party	Candidate	Votes	%	±%
Special Election, April 5, 1983
Democratic	Lloyd H. Kincaid	25,683	58.90%	
Republican	Sheehan Donoghue	17,925	41.10%	
Plurality		7,758	17.79%	
Total votes		43,608	100.0%	-21.65%
Democratic gain from Republican				

Wisconsin State Assembly
District established by 1971 Wis. Act 304	Member of the Wisconsin State Assembly from the 35th district January 1, 1973 – January 3, 1983	Succeeded by Virgil Roberts
Preceded by James F. Rooney	Member of the Wisconsin State Assembly from the 61st district January 3, 1983 – January 7, 1985	Succeeded by Scott C. Fergus
