= Stanley R. Christianson =

Stanley Reuben Christianson
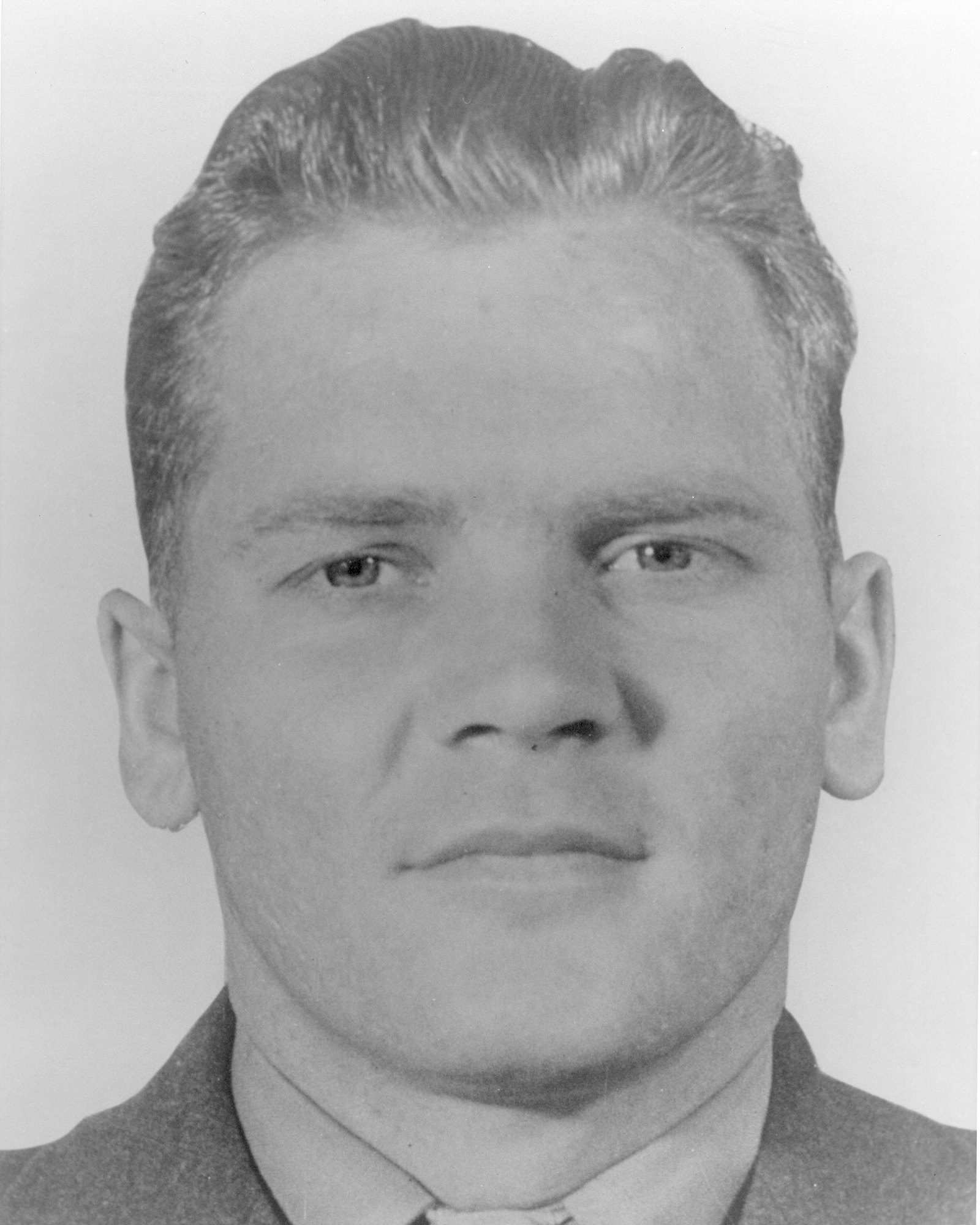
- Born: January 24, 1925; Mindoro, Wisconsin, United States
- Died: September 29, 1950 (aged 25) near Seoul, South Korea
- Burial place: Wet Coulee Cemetery, Mindoro, Wisconsin
- Military career
- Allegiance: United States
- Branch: United States Marine Corps
- Service years: 1942–1945; 1946–1950
- Rank: Corporal (posthumous)
- Unit: 2nd Battalion, 1st Marines
- Conflicts: World War II: Battle of Tarawa; Battle of Saipan; Battle of Tinian; Battle of Okinawa; Korean War: Battle of Inchon; UN September 1950 counteroffensive; Second Battle of Seoul (DOW)
- Awards: Medal of Honor; Bronze Star Medal; Purple Heart

Stanley R. Christianson (January 24, 1925 – September 29, 1950) was a Marine Corps private first class who posthumously received the Medal of Honor, the United States' highest military decoration for valor, for giving his life in a one-man stand against a ferocious attack which threatened to destroy his platoon in Korea on September 29, 1950.

The Medal of Honor was presented to his parents by Secretary of the Navy Dan A. Kimball in Washington, D.C., on August 30, 1951. The award was Christianson's second decoration in 16 days of fighting in Korea. Just 11 days before he was killed, he was awarded the Bronze Star Medal for another act of valor. The 25-year-old veteran of almost eight years in the Marine Corps also had been awarded a Letter of Commendation for meritorious service in the Pacific during World War II.

== Biography ==
Born January 24, 1925, in Mindoro, Wisconsin, Stanley Reuben Christianson attended school in La Crosse County, Wisconsin, and farmed for a time before enlisting in the Marine Corps Reserve on October 2, 1942, at the age of 17.

Following recruit training at San Diego, California, Christianson took advanced training with the 2nd Marine Division and went overseas with that outfit. He fought at Tarawa, Saipan, Tinian, and Okinawa, and served with the occupation forces in Japan.

Discharged in December 1945, Christianson re-enlisted in the regular Marine Corps three months later. He served at the Naval Air Station Pensacola Florida; as a Drill Instructor at Parris Island, South Carolina; at the Naval Ammunition Depot, Hastings, Nebraska; at the Brooklyn Navy Yard, Brooklyn, New York; and at Camp Lejeune, North Carolina, before going overseas to Korea with the 1st Marine Division in August 1950.

After participating in the Inchon landing, he was awarded the Bronze Star Medal on September 18, 1950. The citation said Private First Class Christianson, acting as an automatic rifleman during an assault, "fearlessly and courageously exposed himself to find the exact location of the enemy." Eleven days later, Christianson was killed near Seoul during the UN September 1950 counteroffensive.

== Medal of Honor citation ==
The President of the United States takes pride in presenting the MEDAL OF HONOR posthumously to

PRIVATE FIRST CLASS STANLEY R. CHRISTIANSON
UNITED STATES MARINE CORPS

for service as set forth in the following CITATION:

For conspicuous gallantry and intrepidity at the risk of his life above and beyond the call of duty while serving with Company E, Second Battalion, First Marines, First Marine Division (reinforced), in action against enemy aggressor forces at Hill 132, Seoul, Korea, in the early morning hours of September 29, 1950. Manning one of the several listening posts covering approaches to the platoon area when the enemy commenced the attack, Private First Class Christianson quickly sent another Marine to alert the rest of the platoon. Without orders, he remained in his position and, with full knowledge that he would have slight chance of escape, fired relentlessly at oncoming hostile troops attacking furiously with rifles, automatic weapons and incendiary grenades. Accounting for seven enemy dead in the immediate vicinity before his position was overrun and he himself fatally struck down, Private First Class Christianson, by his superb courage, valiant fighting spirit and devotion to duty, was responsible for allowing the rest of the platoon time to man positions, build up a stronger defense on that flank and repel the attack with 41 of the enemy destroyed, and many more wounded and three taken prisoner. His self-sacrificing actions in the face of overwhelming odds sustain and enhance the finest traditions of the United States Naval Service. Private First Class Christianson gallantly gave his life for his country.

/S/ HARRY S. TRUMAN

== Awards and decorations ==

1st row	Medal of Honor		
2nd row	Bronze Star Medal with "V" Device	Purple Heart	Navy and Marine Corps Commendation Medal
3rd row	Combat Action Ribbon with 1 5/16 inch star	Navy Presidential Unit Citation with 2 Service stars	Marine Corps Good Conduct Medal
4th row	American Campaign Medal	Asiatic-Pacific Campaign Medal with 4 Campaign stars	World War II Victory Medal
5th row	Navy Occupation Service Medal with 'Asia' and 'Europe' clasps	National Defense Service Medal	Korean Service Medal with 3 Campaign stars
6th row	Republic of Korea Presidential Unit Citation	United Nations Korea Medal	Korean War Service Medal

== See also ==
- List of Korean War Medal of Honor recipients
