= Lee Nerison =

American politician (born 1952)

Member of the Wisconsin State Assembly from the 96th district
- In office January 3, 2005 – January 7, 2019
- Preceded by: DuWayne Johnsrud
- Succeeded by: Loren Oldenburg

Personal details
- Born: July 31, 1952 (age 73) La Crosse, Wisconsin, U.S.
- Party: Republican
- Spouse: Laura
- Children: 3
- Profession: Dairy farmer

Lee A. Nerison (born July 31, 1952) is an American dairy farmer and retired politician. He served in the Wisconsin State Assembly for seven terms, from 2005 until 2019. A Republican, he represented southern suburbs of La Crosse as well as Crawford and Vernon counties and the southern half of Monroe County.

== Biography ==
Born in La Crosse, Wisconsin, Nerison is in the agricultural business and lives in Westby, Wisconsin.

Nerison was first elected to the Assembly in 2004. In the Assembly, he was the Chair of the Committee on Agriculture. He was also a member of the Committee on Natural Resources and the Committee on Veterans and Military Affairs.

On February 25, 2011, in the midst of the 2011 Wisconsin protests, Nerison was one of only four Republicans in the Wisconsin Assembly to vote against Governor Scott Walker's controversial budget repair bill.

In March 2018, Nerison announced that he would be retiring from the Wisconsin State Assembly at the end of the 2017–2018 term. He left office January 3, 2019.
