= Mindoro Cut =

Coordinates: 43.973853°N 91.095138°W

- U.S. National Register of Historic Places
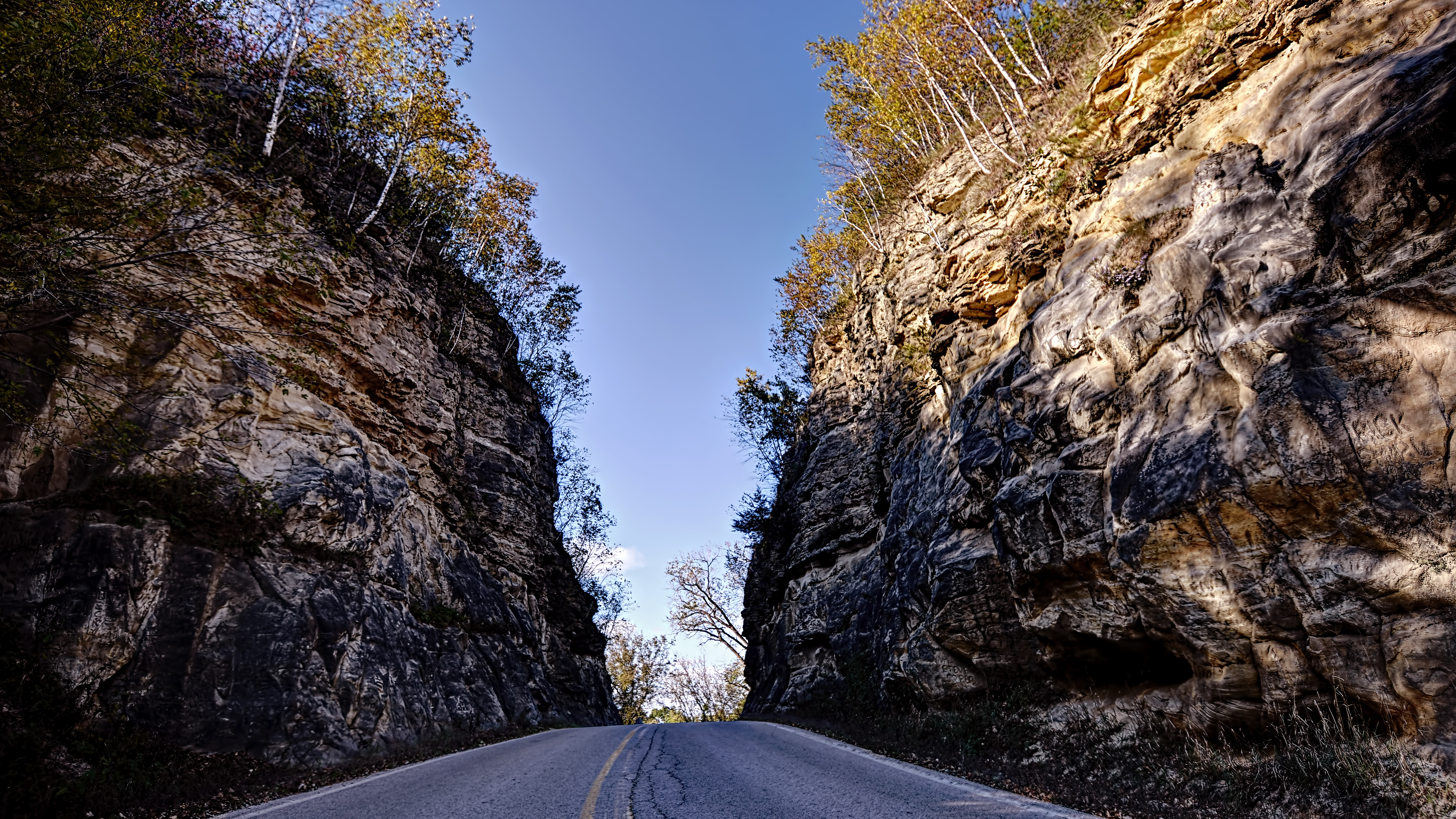
- Looking north

- Location within Wisconsin Location within the United States
- Location: CTH C, bet. Mindoro and West Salem, Town of Farmington, Wisconsin
- Built: 1908
- Architect: Miller, Louis A.
- NRHP reference No.: 07000428
- Added to NRHP: May 15, 2007

Mindoro Cut is a cut in the Town of Farmington in La Crosse County, Wisconsin, which carries County Trunk Highway C through Phillips Ridge, linking Mindoro with West Salem. The cut is 74 feet (23 m) deep, 86 feet (26 m) long, and 25 feet (7.6 m) wide; it is the second-deepest cut built by hand in the Western Hemisphere and the oldest functional cut which has not been improved upon. Work on the cut began in 1907 and concluded in 1908; the project was completed primarily with hand tools. The Mindoro Cut was added to the National Register of Historic Places in 2007.

== History ==
Mindoro farmers and La Crosse County officials commissioned the Mindoro Cut as part of the Good Roads Movement, linking a creamery in Mindoro with a railroad station in West Salem. Before the cut was made, Phillips Ridge was too steep to be traversed, so traffic to Mindoro had to take a longer route bypassing the ridge. Construction on the cut began in 1907 and was primarily conducted with hand tools, though dynamite was also used. Planners initially thought the ridge was composed entirely of sandstone; construction became more difficult when it was realized that the ridge had an interior made of hard dolomite. Since horses could not be effectively used on the steep slope, waste rock was removed from the site via wheelbarrows which were balanced on narrow, uneven planks. Louis Miller, a contractor and supervisor of the project, would fire workers who toppled their wheelbarrow three times; many workers reportedly left the job after bringing their first load down the ridge. Workers were paid $1.25 per day and purchased meals from an on-site cook shanty. The project was completed in 1908; its ultimate cost was $11,241.29, reportedly a loss to its contractors. The highway was paved through the cut and guardrails were put in place in 1920; the cut has not been changed since. The cut was added to the Wisconsin State Register of Historic Places in October 2006 and the National Register of Historic Places on May 15, 2007.

== Gallery ==
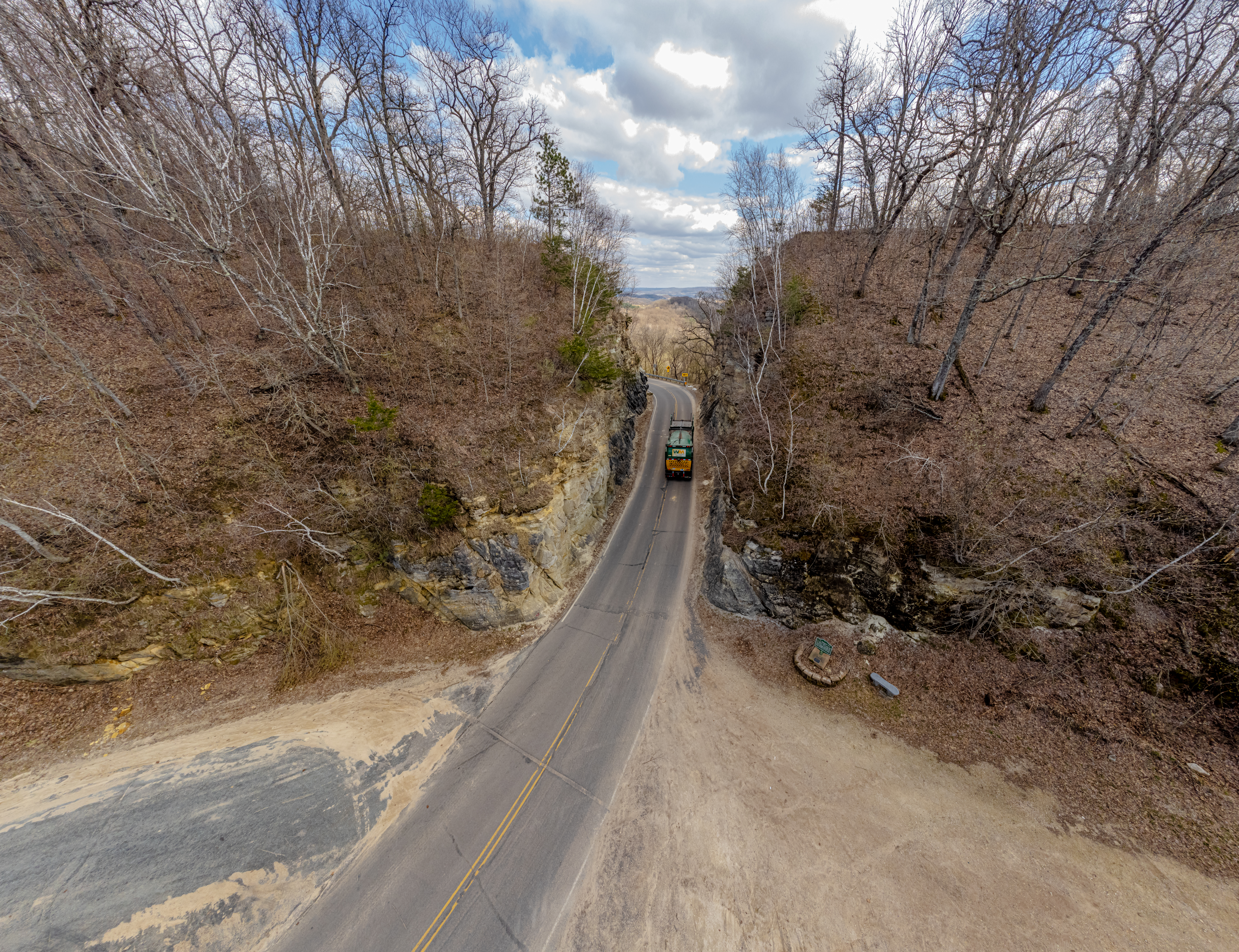

Aerial drone video

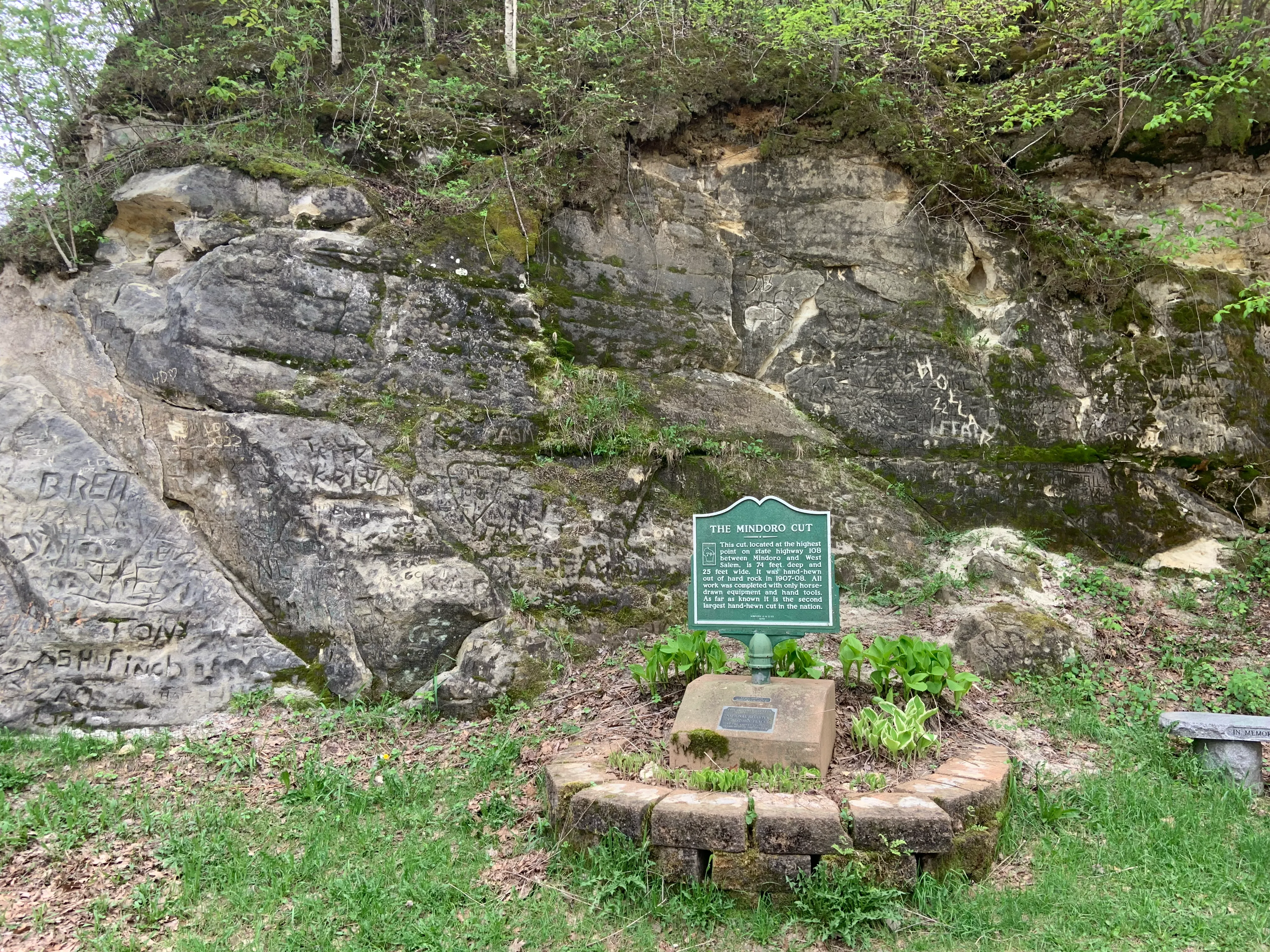
