= Virgil Roberts =

20th century American politician

Member of the Wisconsin State Assembly
- In office January 5, 1987 – January 2, 1995
- Preceded by: Sylvester G. Clements
- Succeeded by: Michael Huebsch
- Constituency: 94th Assembly district
- In office January 3, 1983 – January 7, 1985
- Preceded by: Sheehan Donoghue
- Succeeded by: Thomas D. Ourada
- Constituency: 35th Assembly district
- In office January 1, 1973 – January 3, 1983
- Preceded by: District established
- Succeeded by: Mary Lou Munts
- Constituency: 94th Assembly district
- In office January 4, 1971 – January 1, 1973
- Preceded by: Norbert Nuttelman
- Succeeded by: District abolished
- Constituency: La Crosse 2nd district

Personal details
- Born: April 13, 1922 Mindoro, Wisconsin, U.S.
- Died: April 6, 2011 (aged 88) La Crosse, Wisconsin, U.S.
- Resting place: Farmington Cemetery, Mindoro, Wisconsin
- Party: Democratic
- Spouse: Alice M. Evenson (m. 1945–2011)
- Children: 4
- Education: Winona State University
- Occupation: Train dispatcher, farmer

Virgil D. Roberts (April 13, 1922 – April 6, 2011) was an American farmer, train dispatcher, and Democratic politician from La Crosse County, Wisconsin. He was a member of the Wisconsin State Assembly for 22 years, representing La Crosse County from 1971 to 1985, and from 1987 to 1995.

== Early life ==
Born in Mindoro, Wisconsin, Roberts was rejected for military service during World War II because of a heart defect.

== Career ==
Roberts became interested in public service after taking a course at Winona State University. He later served on the local school board. Roberts worked as a train dispatcher and farmer. Later, Roberts served as a bank director.

From 1971 to 1985 and 1987 to 1993, Roberts served as a member of the Wisconsin State Assembly. He was an unsuccessful nominee for the Wisconsin State Senate in the 1984 election. Roberts was a Democrat.

== Death ==
He died on April 6, 2011, in La Crosse, Wisconsin, one week before his 89th birthday.

Wisconsin State Assembly
| Preceded by Norbert Nuttelman | Member of the Wisconsin State Assembly from the La Crosse 2nd district January 4, 1971 – January 1, 1973 | District abolished |
| District established by 1971 Wis. Act 304 | Member of the Wisconsin State Assembly from the 94th district January 1, 1973 – January 3, 1983 | Succeeded by Mary Lou Munts |
| Preceded by Sheehan Donoghue | Member of the Wisconsin State Assembly from the 35th district January 3, 1983 – January 7, 1985 | Succeeded by Thomas D. Ourada |
| Preceded by Sylvester G. Clements | Member of the Wisconsin State Assembly from the 94th district January 5, 1987 – January 2, 1995 | Succeeded by Michael Huebsch |
