= Agger Rockshelter =

- U.S. National Register of Historic Places
- Nearest city: Stevenstown, Wisconsin
- Area: Less than 1 acre (0.40 ha)
- NRHP reference No.: 87002239
- Added to NRHP: March 25, 1988

Agger Rockshelter is a prehistoric rock shelter located in Stevenstown, in La Crosse County, Wisconsin, United States. The shelter faces west and overlooks a tributary of the Black River. During the 1980s and 1990s the Mississippi Valley Archaeology Center conducted an extensive survey of the Driftless area which led to the discovery of unrecorded rock art.
