= Bell Coulee Shelter =

- U.S. National Register of Historic Places
- Nearest city: Mindoro, Wisconsin
- MPS: Wisconsin Indian Rock Art Sites MPS
- NRHP reference No.: 97000782
- Added to NRHP: July 9, 1997

Bell Coulee Shelter is a prehistoric rock shelter for ancient people, located in Mindoro, Wisconsin, in La Crosse County, Wisconsin.

The Bell Coulee Shelter is a rock art site listed on the National Register of Historic Places. It contains petroglyphs, where a hard object was used to carve or incise a rock surface, and/or pictographs, paintings on the rock using natural pigments.
