= Sylvester G. Clements =

American politician

Sylvester G. Clements (born May 1, 1936) is an American Republican politician, dairy farmer, and businessman.

== Career ==
Born in La Crosse, Wisconsin, Clements graduated from Aquinas High School in 1954 and served in the Wisconsin National Guard. Clements was a dairy farmer, truck driver, and businessman. He served on the La Crosse County, Wisconsin Board of Supervisors and on the Washington Town Board.

== Legislative service ==
He was elected to the Wisconsin State Assembly's newly redrawn 94th District in 1984, defeating Steve Doyle by 10,959 to Doyle's 10,190.

He ran for re-election in 1986, but was unseated by Democratic former State Representative Virgil Roberts, in a race tight enough that a recount was held. The final vote was 8,794 for Roberts to 8,603 for Clements.

== West Salem School Board ==
Clements served on the school board of the West Salem School District. He announced that he will not seek re-election to the West Salem School Board in the Wisconsin April spring election 2020.
