= Supreme Moore Omokunde =

American politician (born 1979)

- Omokunde in 2025

Member of the Wisconsin State Assembly from the 17th district
- Incumbent
- Assumed office January 4, 2021
- Preceded by: David Crowley

Member of the Milwaukee County Board of Supervisors from the 10th district
- In office April 2015 – December 18, 2020
- Preceded by: David Bowen
- Succeeded by: Priscilla Coggs-Jones

Personal details
- Born: August 22, 1979 (age 47) Milwaukee, Wisconsin, U.S.
- Party: Democratic
- Relatives: Gwen Moore (mother)
- Education: Marquette University; University of Wisconsin, Milwaukee

Supreme Moore Omokunde (born August 22, 1979) is an American community organizer and Democratic politician from Milwaukee, Wisconsin. He has also been known by the names Sowande Ajumoke Omokunde and Supreme Solar Allah. He is a member of the Wisconsin State Assembly, representing Wisconsin's 17th Assembly district since 2021. He was also a member of the Milwaukee County Board of Supervisors from 2015 through 2020.

He is the son of U.S. Representative Gwen Moore.

== Biography ==
Supreme Moore Omokunde was born and raised in Milwaukee, Wisconsin. He has worked as an organizer for several Milwaukee organizations, most recently working as community organizer for the Sherman Park Community Association.

He was elected to the Milwaukee County Board of Supervisors in a 2015 special election to replace David Bowen, who had been elected to the Wisconsin State Assembly. Moore Omokunde was re-elected in 2016 and 2018. During his time on the County Board, he was chair of the Health and Human Needs Committee and a member of the Finance and Audit Committee.

Moore Omokunde made his first attempt at election to the Wisconsin State Assembly in 2018. In May, Moore Omokunde informed incumbent Leon Young that he planned to make a primary challenge in the fall for his 16th assembly district seat. Young, who was in his 13th term in the Assembly, announced instead that he would not run for re-election. The announcement of an open seat resulted in a five-person primary field. Moore Omokunde earned the endorsement of the Wisconsin Working Families Party, but ultimately finished 245 votes short in the Democratic primary, losing to Kalan Haywood, who went on to become the youngest state legislator in Wisconsin history.

In 2020, following the resignation of Assemblyman David Crowley, who had been elected Milwaukee County Executive, Moore Omokunde announced his candidacy for the Assembly in Crowley's vacated 17th district seat. He won the Democratic primary with 48% of the vote, and soundly defeated Republican Abie Eisenbach in the general election. Following his election, Moore Omokunde announced he would resign his seat on the County Board effective December 18, 2020.

=== 2004 campaign vandalism incident ===
Following the heated 2004 presidential election, Moore Omokunde (then known as "Sowande Ajumoke Omokunde") was one of five young volunteers for the John Kerry campaign charged with felony destruction of property in connection with an incident in the early morning hours of election day, November 2, 2004. Also charged was Michael Pratt, the son of former Milwaukee City Council President and one-time acting-Mayor Marvin Pratt. The five were accused of slashing the tires of 25 cars and vans owned or rented by the Republican Party of Wisconsin in the parking lot of the party's offices in Milwaukee.

Four of the five, including Omokunde, eventually pleaded no contest to a lesser charge of misdemeanor damage to property. The fifth defendant refused the deal and was acquitted by the jury. According to the terms of their plea deal, the district attorney recommended each receive probation and a fine of $5,317. Judge Michael B. Brennan, however, rejected the sentencing recommendation and instead sentenced the four men to six months in jail. Moore Omokunde ultimately served four months and paid a $1,000 fine. The incident, trial, and sentencing provoked intense emotion throughout the state on both sides of the issue, and was brought up again in the 2008 election, forcing the Obama campaign to publicly disavow Omokunde.

== Personal life and family ==
Supreme Moore Omokunde is the son of Gwen Moore, Milwaukee's representative in the United States House of Representatives since 2005. He is a member of the Milwaukee Public Museum Board of Directors and a former Commissioner on the Milwaukee County Human Rights Commission.

== Electoral history ==
=== Milwaukee County Board (2015) ===
Milwaukee County Board, 10th District Special Election, 2015
| Party | Candidate | Votes | % | ±% |
|---|---|---|---|---|
General Election, April 8, 2015
| Nonpartisan | Supreme Moore Omokunde | 1,190 | 56.00% | |
| Nonpartisan | Solana Patterson-Ramos | 904 | 42.54% | |
| | Scattering | 31 | 1.46% | |
| Plurality | | 286 | 13.46% | |
| Total votes | | 2,125 | 100.0% | |

=== Wisconsin Assembly, 16th district (2018) ===
| Year | Election | Date | Elected | | | | Defeated | | | | Total | Plurality |
|---|---|---|---|---|---|---|---|---|---|---|---|---|
| 2018 | Primary | Aug. 14 | Kalan Haywood | Democratic | 2,324 | 37.35% | Supreme Moore Omokunde | Dem. | 2,079 | 33.41% | 6,222 | 245 |
| 2018 | Primary | Aug. 14 | Kalan Haywood | Democratic | 2,324 | 37.35% | Rick Banks | Dem. | 977 | 15.70% | 6,222 | 245 |
| 2018 | Primary | Aug. 14 | Kalan Haywood | Democratic | 2,324 | 37.35% | Danielle McClendon-Williams | Dem. | 454 | 7.30% | 6,222 | 245 |
| 2018 | Primary | Aug. 14 | Kalan Haywood | Democratic | 2,324 | 37.35% | Brandy Bond | Dem. | 367 | 5.90% | 6,222 | 245 |

=== Wisconsin Assembly, 17th district (2020–present) ===
| Year | Election | Date | Elected | | | | Defeated | | | | Total | Plurality |
|---|---|---|---|---|---|---|---|---|---|---|---|---|
| 2020 | Primary | Aug. 11 | Supreme Moore Omokunde | Democratic | 3,457 | 48.15% | Chris Walton | Dem. | 2,553 | 35.56% | 7,180 | 904 |
| 2020 | Primary | Aug. 11 | Supreme Moore Omokunde | Democratic | 3,457 | 48.15% | Mike Brox | Dem. | 1,157 | 16.11% | 7,180 | 904 |
| 2020 | General | Nov. 3 | Supreme Moore Omokunde | Democratic | 22,418 | 85.93% | Abie Eisenbach | Rep. | 3,638 | 13.94% | 26,089 | 18,780 |
| 2022 | General | Nov. 8 | Supreme Moore Omokunde (inc) | Democratic | 17,966 | 83.91% | Abie Eisenbach | Rep. | 3,410 | 15.93% | 21,412 | 14,556 |
| 2024 | General | Nov. 5 | Supreme Moore Omokunde (inc) | Democratic | 24,469 | 98.45% | --unopposed-- | | | | 24,854 | |
