= Walter Kunicki =

American politician (born 1958)

Walter J. Kunicki

71st Speaker of the Wisconsin State Assembly
- In office January 7, 1991 – January 3, 1995
- Preceded by: Thomas A. Loftus
- Succeeded by: David Prosser Jr.

Minority Leader of the Wisconsin Assembly
- In office January 3, 1995 – May 26, 1998
- Preceded by: David Prosser Jr.
- Succeeded by: Shirley Krug

Member of the Wisconsin State Assembly
- In office January 4, 1993 – January 1, 1999
- Preceded by: Peter Bock
- Succeeded by: Pedro Colón
- Constituency: 8th Assembly district
- In office January 3, 1985 – January 4, 1993
- Preceded by: Thomas W. Meaux
- Succeeded by: Tim Carpenter
- Constituency: 9th Assembly district
- In office January 3, 1983 – January 3, 1985
- Preceded by: Lois Plous
- Succeeded by: Shirley Krug
- Constituency: 15th Assembly district
- In office January 5, 1981 – January 3, 1983
- Preceded by: Joseph Czerwinski
- Succeeded by: Charles W. Coleman
- Constituency: 27th Assembly district

Personal details
- Born: June 9, 1958 (age 68) Milwaukee, Wisconsin, U.S.
- Party: Democratic
- Education: University of Wisconsin–Milwaukee (B.S., 1980)
- Profession: Lobbyist

Walter J. Kunicki (born June 9, 1958) is an American lobbyist and former politician from Milwaukee, Wisconsin. He served as the 71st speaker of the Wisconsin State Assembly, from 1991 to 1995. A Democrat, he represented south-central Milwaukee for 18 years in the Assembly. Since leaving office, he has lobbied on behalf of Wisconsin Gas LLC and WEC Energy Group, where he is now senior vice president for state public affairs.

== Biography ==
Born in Milwaukee, Wisconsin, Kunicki graduated from Milwaukee Technical High School and received his Bachelor's degree from the University of Wisconsin–Milwaukee in 1980.

That same year, he was elected to his first term in the Wisconsin State Assembly. He narrowly won the Democratic nomination for the seat, topping a crowded seven-candidate primary contest. He went on to win re-election 8 times, even as the district was redrawn in 1982, 1984, and 1992. In 1991, after the expiration of the term of Speaker Thomas A. Loftus, who had chosen to run for Governor of Wisconsin in 1990 rather than seek re-election to the Assembly, the members elected Kunicki as the new speaker. He continued as speaker until the Republicans took the majority in the 1994 election, and then became the Democrats' leader in the minority. He did not run for re-election in 1998.

Since leaving office, Kunicki has worked as a vice president at Wisconsin Energy Corporation, and has worked as a registered lobbyist for them in the Wisconsin Legislature. Kunicki is a member of the State Legislative Leaders Foundation and the National Speakers Conference.

== Personal life and family ==
Earlier in his career, Kunicki was an occupational health nurse and remained a member of the Wisconsin Nurses Association through his time as a legislator. He is married.

Kunicki's son, Kyle, ran unsuccessfully for the open 40th Assembly district in 2024.

== Electoral history ==
=== Wisconsin Assembly 27th District (1980) ===
Wisconsin Assembly, 27th District Election, 1980
Party	Candidate	Votes	%	±%
Democratic Primary, September 9, 1980
Democratic	Walter Kunicki	662	21.44%	
Democratic	Narciso L. Aleman	592	19.18%	
Democratic	Daryl Laatsch	567	18.37%	
Democratic	Sam L. Orlich	409	13.25%	
Democratic	Harvey J. Cooper	353	11.44%	
Democratic	John A. Tadych	341	11.05%	
Democratic	Barbara Svetlik	163	5.28%	
Plurality		70	2.27%	
Total votes		3,087	100.0%	
General Election, November 4, 1980
Democratic	Walter Kunicki	7,645	75.82%	
Republican	Roger Sullivan	2,438	24.18%	
Plurality		5,207	51.64%	
Total votes		10,083	100.0%	
Democratic hold				

Wisconsin State Assembly
Preceded by Joseph Czerwinski	Member of the Wisconsin State Assembly from the 27th district January 5, 1981 – January 3, 1983	Succeeded by Charles W. Coleman
Preceded by Lois Plous	Member of the Wisconsin State Assembly from the 15th district January 3, 1983 – January 3, 1985	Succeeded by Shirley Krug
Preceded by Thomas W. Meaux	Member of the Wisconsin State Assembly from the 9th district January 3, 1985 – January 4, 1993	Succeeded by Tim Carpenter
Preceded by Peter Bock	Member of the Wisconsin State Assembly from the 8th district January 4, 1993 – January 1, 1999	Succeeded by Pedro Colón
Preceded by Thomas A. Loftus	Speaker of the Wisconsin State Assembly; January 7, 1991 – January 3, 1995	Succeeded by David Prosser Jr.
Preceded by David Prosser Jr.	Minority Leader of the Wisconsin Assembly; January 3, 1995 – May 26, 1998	Succeeded by Shirley Krug
