= 2018 Wisconsin elections =

- April 3, 2018; November 6, 2018

The 2018 Wisconsin Fall general election was held in the U.S. state of Wisconsin on November 6, 2018. All of Wisconsin's partisan executive and administrative offices were up for election, as well as one of Wisconsin's U.S. Senate seats, Wisconsin's eight seats in the United States House of Representatives, 17 seats in the Wisconsin State Senate, and all 99 seats in the Wisconsin State Assembly. The 2018 Wisconsin Fall partisan primary was held on August 14, 2018. There were also special elections held during 2018 for three State Assembly seats and two state senate seats.

The Democrats swept in all of the fall elections for statewide officials, unseating three incumbent Republicans, including two-term governor Scott Walker, and winning the open race for state treasurer. Republicans maintained control of both chambers in the Wisconsin Legislature however, as well as a majority of the state's U.S. House seats.

The 2018 Wisconsin Spring election was held on April 3, 2018. This election featured a contested election for Wisconsin Supreme Court, as well as a referendum on an amendment to the Constitution of Wisconsin, and various other nonpartisan local and judicial races. The 2018 Wisconsin Spring primary was held on February 20, 2018.

In the nonpartisan Supreme Court election, the Wisconsin Democrats also claimed victory, as their preferred candidate defeated the Republicans' preferred candidate, reducing the Republican majority on the court to 4–3.

== Federal offices ==
=== U.S. Senate ===
Incumbent Democrat Tammy Baldwin, first elected in 2012, won re-election to a second term by an 11 percentage point margin against Republican challenger Leah Vukmir. This was the widest margin of victory won by a statewide candidate in Wisconsin's 2018 elections, and marked the widest margin won by a U.S. Senate candidate in Wisconsin since Herb Kohl's landslide victory in the 2006 election.

United States Senate election in Wisconsin, 2018
Party	Candidate	Votes	%
Democratic	Tammy Baldwin (incumbent)	1,472,914	55.4
Republican	Leah Vukmir	1,184,885	44.5
n/a	Write-ins	2,964	0.1
Total votes		2,660,763	100.0
Democratic hold			

=== U.S. House of Representatives ===
All 8 of Wisconsin's congressional districts were up for election in November. Seven incumbents ran for re-election, while the 1st district saw an open race after incumbent and then-Speaker of the House Paul Ryan announced his retirement. No seats flipped in the election, with Republicans continuing to hold five of the state's House seats to the Democrats' three.

District	Democratic		Republican		Others		Total		Result
District	Votes	%	Votes	%	Votes	%	Votes	%	Result
District 1	137,508	42.27%	177,492	54.56%	10,317	3.17%	325,317	100.00%	Republican hold
District 2	309,116	97.42%	0	0.00%	8,179	2.58%	317,295	100.00%	Democratic hold
District 3	187,888	59.65%	126,980	40.31%	121	0.04%	314,989	100.00%	Democratic hold
District 4	206,487	75.61%	59,091	21.64%	7,509	2.75%	273,087	100.00%	Democratic hold
District 5	138,385	37.99%	225,619	61.93%	284	0.08%	364,288	100.00%	Republican hold
District 6	144,536	44.46%	180,311	55.47%	218	0.07%	325,065	100.00%	Republican hold
District 7	124,307	38.50%	194,061	60.11%	4,472	1.39%	322,840	100.00%	Republican hold
District 8	119,265	36.28%	209,410	63.69%	99	0.03%	328,774	100.00%	Republican hold
Total	1,367,492	53.18%	1,172,964	45.61%	31,199	1.21%	2,571,655	100.00%	

== State ==
=== Executive ===
All of Wisconsin's executive offices saw close election results, with the largest vote difference in any race being eight-term incumbent secretary of state Doug La Follette‘s 5.5 percent margin of victory. Every executive office was won by the Democratic candidate.

==== Governor ====
Incumbent Republican governor Scott Walker, first elected in 2010, sought re-election to a third term. Despite having won two prior elections and a recall by fairly comfortable margins, Walker faced rising unpopularity due to his policies regarding infrastructure and education, among other issues, resulting in a close race. Low approval in Wisconsin of incumbent Republican U.S. President Donald Trump also harmed Walker in the election.

Walker was ultimately defeated by Democrat Tony Evers by a narrow one percent margin, ending eight years of unified Republican control of the state.

Other candidates included Libertarian Phil Anderson and Independent Maggie Turnbull.

Wisconsin gubernatorial election, 2018
Party	Candidate	Votes	%
Democratic	Tony Evers	1,324,307	49.5
Republican	Scott Walker (incumbent)	1,295,080	48.4
Libertarian	Phil Anderson	20,255	0.8
Independent	Maggie Turnbull	18,884	0.7
Green	Michael White	11,087	0.4
Independent	Arnie Enz	2,745	0.1
Write-in		980	0.1
Total votes		2,673,308	100.0
Democratic gain from Republican			

==== Lieutenant governor ====
Former state representative Mandela Barnes defeated incumbent Republican lieutenant governor Rebecca Kleefisch, who had served since 2011, and Libertarian Patrick Baird. Barnes became Wisconsin's first African-American lieutenant governor, and the second African-American ever elected to state office in Wisconsin.

==== Attorney general ====
Republican incumbent Brad Schimel, first elected in 2014, ran for re-election to a second term. Voting rights attorney and former federal prosecutor Josh Kaul, the Democratic nominee, defeated Schimel in the general election. Terry Larson, the Constitution Party nominee, also garnered around 2% of the vote, greater than the vote difference between Schimel and Kaul.

Wisconsin Attorney General election, 2018
Party	Candidate	Votes	%
Democratic	Josh Kaul	1,305,902	49.4
Republican	Brad Schimel (incumbent)	1,288,712	48.8
Constitution	Terry Larson	47,038	1.8
Write-in		1,199	0.0
Total votes		2,642,851	100.0
Democratic gain from Republican			

==== Secretary of state ====
Incumbent Democrat Doug La Follette, first elected in 1982 (and also serving from 1975 to 1979), won re-election to a tenth non-consecutive term. Madison Alderwoman Arvina Martin challenged La Follette in the Democratic primary.

Jay Schroeder was nominated in the Republican primary to run against La Follette, pledging to abolish the position if elected.

Libertarian sports announcer Rich Reynolds declared his candidacy for the position as well, joining the "TeamGuv" bill with Phil Anderson and Patrick Baird.

Governing magazine projected the race as "safe Democratic".

Wisconsin Secretary of State election, 2018
Party	Candidate	Votes	%
Democratic	Doug La Follette (incumbent)	1,380,752	52.7
Republican	Jay Schroeder	1,235,034	47.2
Write-in		2,162	0.1
Total votes		2,617,948	100.0
Democratic hold			

==== Treasurer ====
Earlier in the year, a referendum had been held on whether or not to abolish the State Treasurer office, a move that Wisconsin voters rejected by a margin of more than 20 percent.

Incumbent Republican Matt Adamczyk, first elected in 2014, chose not to run for reelection. Sarah Godlewski, the Democratic nominee, defeated Republican Travis Hartwig in the general.

Wisconsin Treasurer election, 2018
Party	Candidate	Votes	%
Democratic	Sarah Godlewski	1,324,110	50.9
Republican	Travis Hartwig	1,216,811	46.8
Constitution	Andrew Zuelke	59,570	2.2
Write-in		1,471	0.1
Total votes		2,601,962	100.0
Democratic gain from Republican			

=== Legislature ===
==== State senate ====
Two special elections had been held earlier in the year for the 1st and 10th districts. Both races were won by Democrats, despite the respective districts’ usual Republican leanings.

The 17 odd-numbered districts out of the 33 seats in the Wisconsin Senate were up for election in 2018, including the 1st district. In total, Republicans had 10 seats up for election, while Democrats had 7. André Jacque was able to win back the 1st district seat for Republicans from Democrat Caleb Frostman, who had defeated him in the June special election.

At the start of 2018, the senate had a composition of 18 Republicans and 13 Democrats with two vacancies. The net result of all 2018 state senate elections was a gain of one seat for both parties. When compared to the 2016 general election, however, the Republican majority was reduced from 20 to 13 (60.6%) to 19-14 (57.6%).

===== Summary =====
Affiliation	Party (Shading indicates majority caucus)		Total	
Affiliation	Democratic	Republican	Total	Vacant
Last election (2016)	13	20	33	0
Before 2018	13	18	31	2
After Jan. 16 special	14	18	32	1
After June 12 special	15	18	33	0
Up in 2018 general	7	10	17	
Incumbent retiring	1	2	3	
After 2018 elections	14	19	33	0
Voting share	42%	58%		

==== State Assembly ====
All 99 seats in the Wisconsin State Assembly were up for election in 2018. There were also two special elections for three Assembly vacancies during the course of 2018. Republicans lost one seat to the Democrats in the 2018 general election, resulting a 63-36 seat Republican majority going into the 2019-2020 session.

===== Summary =====
Affiliation	Party (Shading indicates majority caucus)		Total	
Affiliation	Democratic	Republican	Total	Vacant
Last election (2016)	35	64	99	0
Before 2018	34	62	96	3
After Jan. 16 special	35	63	98	1
After June 12 special	35	64	99	0
Up in 2018 general	35	64	99	
Incumbent retiring	4	9	13	
Incumbent lost primary	2	0	2	
Total without incumbent	6	9	15	
After 2018 elections	36	63	99	0
Voting share	36%	64%		

=== Judiciary ===
==== State Supreme Court ====
===== Results =====
2018 Wisconsin Supreme Court election
Primary election
Party	Candidate	Votes	%
Nonpartisan	Michael Screnock	247,582	46.28%
Nonpartisan	Rebecca Dallet	191,268	35.75%
Nonpartisan	Tim Burns	95,508	17.85%
Write-in		662	0.12%
Total votes		534,980	100.0%
General election
Nonpartisan	Rebecca Dallet	555,848	55.72%
Nonpartisan	Michael Screnock	440,808	44.19%
Write-in		829	0.08%
Total votes		997,485	100.0%

==== State Court of Appeals ====
Two seats on the Wisconsin Court of Appeals were up for election in 2018, but both seats were uncontested.

- In District I, Judge Timothy Dugan was elected to his first full term after being appointed by Governor Scott Walker in 2016.
- In District IV, Judge JoAnne Kloppenburg was elected to her second six-year term.

==== State Circuit Courts ====
Fifty three of the state's 249 circuit court seats were up for election in 2018. Eleven of those seats were contested. Only one incumbent was defeated seeking re-election, Shaughnessy Murphy—an appointee of Governor Scott Walker in the Eau Claire Circuit.

- In the Buffalo–Pepin circuit, district attorney Thomas W. Clark defeated family court commissioner Roger Hillestad to succeed retiring judge James J. Duvall.
- In Clark County's branch 1 election, former district attorney Lyndsey Boon Brunette defeated attorney Roberta Heckes to succeed retiring judge Jon Counsell.
- In Columbia County's branch 3 election, assistant district attorney Troy D. Cross defeated former Sauk County corporation counsel Brenda Yaskal to succeed retired judge Alan White. Attorneys Steven Sarbacker and Clifford Burdon were eliminated in the nonpartisan primary.
- In Dane County's branch 1 election, former assistant attorney general Susan M. Crawford defeated municipal judge Marilyn Townsend to succeed retiring judge Timothy Samuelson.
- In Eau Claire County's branch 5 election, attorney Sarah Harless defeated incumbent judge Shaughnessy Murphy.
- In Juneau County's branch 1 election, assistant Vernon County district attorney Stacy Smith defeated former district attorney Scott Southworth to succeed retired judge John Pier Roemer.
- In Manitowoc County's branch 2 election, attorney Jerilyn Dietz defeated attorney Ralph Sczygelski to succeed retiring judge Gary Bendix. Municipal judge Eric Pangburn, court commissioner Patricia Koppa, and attorney John Bilka were eliminated in the nonpartisan primary.
- In the Price County circuit, incumbent judge Kevin Klein defeated a challenge from district attorney Mark Fuhr.
- In Sauk County's branch 3 election, former district attorney Patricia Barrett defeated municipal judge Sandra Cardo Gorsuch to succeed retiring judge Guy Reynolds.
- In Waukesha County's branch 12 election, court commissioner Laura Lau defeated attorney Jack Melvin to succeed retiring judge Kathryn Foster.
- In Winnebago County's branch 1 election, attorney Teresa Basiliere defeated deputy district attorney Scott Ceman to succeed retiring judge Thomas Gritton.

Circuit	Branch	Incumbent	Elected			Defeated			Defeated in primary
Circuit	Branch	Incumbent	Name	Votes	%	Name	Votes	%	Name(s)
Ashland		Robert E. Eaton	Kelly J. McKnight	2,181	97.72%				
Brown	2	Thomas J. Walsh	Thomas J. Walsh	28,323	99.24%				
Brown	6	John P. Zakowski	John P. Zakowski	30,141	99.26%				
Buffalo–Pepin		James J. Duvall	Thomas W. Clark	2,650	56.58%	Roger M. Hillestad	2,030	43.34%	
Calumet		Jeffrey S. Froehlich	Jeffrey S. Froehlich	5,531	99.41%				
Chippewa	1	Steven H. Gibbs	Steven H. Gibbs	8,170	100.00%				
Clark		Jon M. Counsell	Lyndsey Boon Brunette	4,028	76.40%	Roberta A. Heckes	1,240	23.52%	
Columbia	3	Alan White	Troy D. Cross	5,059	50.27%	Brenda L. Yaskal	4,974	49.42%	Steven J. Sarbacker; Clifford C. Burdon
Dane	1	Timothy Samuelson	Susan M. Crawford	59,048	51.40%	Marilyn Townsend	55,234	49.08%	
Dane	8	Frank D. Remington	Frank D. Remington	84,723	98.62%				
Dane	11	Ellen K. Berz	Ellen K. Berz	84,711	98.74%				
Door	1	D. Todd Ehlers	D. Todd Ehlers	5,789	98.99%				
Eau Claire	3	William M. Gabler Sr.	Emily M. Long	13,036	98.89%				
Eau Claire	4	Jon M. Theisen	Jon M. Theisen	13,238	98.89%				
Eau Claire	5	Shaughnessy Murphy	Sarah Harless	10,530	61.28%	Shaughnessy Murphy	6,635	38.61%	
Jefferson	3	Robert F. Dehring Jr.	Robert F. Dehring Jr.	9,356	98.82%				
Juneau	1	John Pier Roemer	Stacy A. Smith	2,517	52.58%	Scott Harold Southworth	2,268	47.38%	
Kenosha	2	Jason A. Rossell	Jason A. Rossell	13,831	98.68%				
Manitowoc	2	Gary Bendix	Jerilyn M. Dietz	10,199	62.84%	Ralph Sczygelski	6,008	37.02%	Patricia Koppa; Eric Pangburn; John Bilka
Menominee–Shawano	2	William F. Kussel Jr.	William F. Kussel Jr.	4,586	100.00%				
Milwaukee	8	William Sosnay	William Sosnay	69,756	98.45%				
Milwaukee	17	Carolina Maria Stark	Carolina Maria Stark	70,087	98.65%				
Milwaukee	20	Dennis P. Moroney	Joseph Wall	68,878	98.65%				
Milwaukee	23	Lindsey Grady	Lindsey Grady	69,389	98.78%				
Milwaukee	28	Mark A. Sanders	Mark A. Sanders	68,935	98.77%				
Milwaukee	38	Jeffrey A. Wagner	Jeffrey A. Wagner	71,889	98.59%				
Milwaukee	39	Jane V. Carroll	Jane V. Carroll	68,981	98.82%				
Milwaukee	43	Marshall B. Murray	Marshall B. Murray	67,787	98.79%				
Monroe	3	J. David Rice	Rick Radcliffe	5,241	99.45%				
Oneida	2	Michael H. Bloom	Michael H. Bloom	5,896	99.44%				
Outagamie	4	Gregory B. Gill Jr.	Gregory B. Gill Jr.	18,226	100.00%				
Outagamie	5	Carrie Schneider	Carrie Schneider	18,875	100.00%				
Outagamie	7	John A. Des Jardins	John A. Des Jardins	18,841	100.00%				
Portage	1	Thomas B. Eagon	Thomas B. Eagon	8,620	99.52%				
Portage	3	Thomas T. Flugaur	Thomas T. Flugaur	8,655	99.40%				
Price		Kevin G. Klein	Kevin G. Klein	2,599	65.68%	Mark T. Fuhr	1,358	34.32%	
Racine	1	Wynne P. Laufenberg	Wynne P. Laufenberg	19,216	98.96%				
Racine	5	Mike Piontek	Mike Piontek	19,827	99.06%				
Racine	9	Robert S. Repischak	Robert S. Repischak	19,183	99.01%				
Racine	10	Timothy D. Boyle	Timothy D. Boyle	19,727	99.13%				
Richland		Andrew Sharp	Andrew Sharp	2,816	99.61%				
Rock	3	Jeffrey S. Kuglitsch	Jeffrey S. Kuglitsch	16,739	99.03%				
Rock	7	Barbara W. McCrory	Barbara W. McCrory	17,282	99.13%				
St. Croix	3	Scott R. Needham	Scott R. Needham	9,687	99.08%				
Sauk	3	Guy D. Reynolds	Patricia Barrett	5,701	50.11%	Sandra Cardo Gorsuch	5,675	49.89%	
Walworth	1	Phillip A. Koss	Phillip A. Koss	12,763	98.92%				
Washington	4	Andrew T. Gonring	Andrew T. Gonring	21,026	100.00%				
Waukesha	2	Jennifer R. Dorow	Jennifer R. Dorow	55,483	98.97%				
Waukesha	12	Kathryn W. Foster	Laura Lau	38,138	50.29%	Jack Melvin	37,517	49.47%	
Waupaca	3	Raymond S. Huber	Raymond S. Huber	5,979	99.52%				
Winnebago	1	Thomas J. Gritton	Teresa S. Basiliere	12,205	56.39%	Scott A. Ceman	9,391	43.39%	
Winnebago	4	Karen L. Seifert	Karen L. Seifert	16,960	99.18%				
Wood	2	Nicholas J. Brazeau, Jr.	Nicholas J. Brazeau Jr.	9,361	100.00%				

=== Ballot measures ===
==== Constitutional amendment ====
Question 1
- April 3, 2018
- Elimination of state treasurer. Shall sections 1 and 3 of article VI and sections 7 and 8 of article X of the constitution be amended, and section 17 of article XIV of the constitution be created, to eliminate the office of state treasurer from the constitution and to replace the state treasurer with the lieutenant governor as a member of the Board of Commissioners of Public Lands?

Results
Choice	Votes	%
Yes	365,120	38.55%
No	582,117	61.45%
Total votes	947,237	100.00%
- Yes: 50–60% No: 50–60% 60–70% 70–80%

In the Spring election, Wisconsin voters strongly rejected an amendment to the Constitution of Wisconsin which would have abolished the office of State Treasurer of Wisconsin.

Elimination of State Treasurer
Candidate	Votes	%
No	582,117	61
Yes	365,120	39
Total votes	947,237	100

== Local elections ==
=== Cannabis advisory questions ===
Voters in eleven Wisconsin counties approved non-binding referendums expressing support for legalizing medical cannabis, and voters in six counties approved non-binding referendums expressing support for legalizing recreational cannabis. The support for medical cannabis ranged from 67.1% in Clark County to 88.5% in Kenosha County, while support for recreational cannabis ranged from 60.2% in Racine county to 76.4% in Dane County. The 16 counties that weighed in accounted for over half the state's population.

County or city	Question	Yes	No
Brown County	“Should cannabis be legalized in Wisconsin for medicinal purposes, and regulated in the same manner as other prescription drugs?”	76%	24%
Clark County	“Should the State of Wisconsin legalize the use of marijuana for medical purposes and regulate its use in the same manner as other prescription drugs?”	67%	33%
Dane County	“Should marijuana be legalized, taxed and regulated in the same manner as alcohol for adults 21 years of age or older?”	76%	24%
Eau Claire County	"Should cannabis: Be legal for adult, 21 years of age and older, recreational or medical use, taxed and regulated like alcohol, with the proceeds from the taxes used for education, healthcare, and infrastructure in Wisconsin?	54%	N/A
Eau Claire County	"Should cannabis: Be legal for medical purposes only and available only by prescription through a medical dispensary?"	31%	N/A
Eau Claire County	"Should cannabis: Remain a criminally illegal drug as provided under current law?"	15%	N/A
Forest County	“Should the State of Wisconsin allow individuals with debilitating medical conditions to use and safely access marijuana for medical purposes, if those individuals have a written recommendation from a licensed Wisconsin physician?”	79%	21%
Kenosha County	“Should the State of Wisconsin allow individuals with debilitating medical conditions to use and safely access marijuana for medical purposes, if those individuals have a written recommendation from a licensed Wisconsin physician?”	88%	12%
La Crosse County	“Should the State of Wisconsin legalize the use of marijuana by adults 21 years or older, to be taxed and regulated in the same manner that alcohol is regulated in the State of Wisconsin, with proceeds from taxes used for education, healthcare, and infrastructure?”	63%	37%
Langlade County	“Should the State of Wisconsin allow individuals with debilitating medical conditions to use and safely access marijuana for medical purposes, if those individuals have a written recommendation from a licensed Wisconsin physician?”	77%	23%
Lincoln County	“Should the State of Wisconsin allow individuals with debilitating medical conditions to use and safely access marijuana for medical purposes, if those individuals have a written recommendation from a licensed Wisconsin physician?”	81%	19%
Marathon County	“Should the State of Wisconsin allow individuals with debilitating medical conditions to use and safely access marijuana for medical purposes, if those individuals have a written recommendation from a licensed Wisconsin physician?”	82%	18%
Marquette County	“Shall the County of Marquette, Wisconsin, adopt the following resolution? Resolved, that “We the People” of Marquette County, Wisconsin, support the right of its citizens to acquire, possess and use medical cannabis upon the recommendation of a licensed physician, and; Be It Further Resolved, that we strongly support a statewide referendum requesting Wisconsin to join with thirty-two (32) other states that have already approved the use of medical cannabis for the treatment of chronic pain, several debilitating diseases and disabling symptoms.”	78%	22%
Milwaukee County	“Do you favor allowing adults 21 years of age and older to engage in the personal use of marijuana, while also regulating commercial marijuana-related activities, and imposing a tax on the sale of marijuana?”	70%	30%
Portage County	“Should the State of Wisconsin allow individuals with debilitating medical conditions to use and safely access marijuana for medical [treatment] purposes, if those individuals have a written [treatment] recommendation from a licensed Wisconsin physician?”	83%	17%
Racine County	“Should marijuana be legalized for medicinal use?”	85%	15%
Racine County	“Should marijuana be legalized, taxed, and regulated in the same manner as alcohol for adults 21 years of age or older?”	59%	41%
Racine County	“Should proceeds from marijuana taxes be used to fund education, health care, and infrastructure?”	81%	19%
Rock County	“Should cannabis be legalized for adult use, taxed and regulated like alcohol, with the proceeds from the Taxes used for education, healthcare, and infrastructure?”	69%	31%
Sauk County	“Should the state of Wisconsin legalize medical marijuana so that people with debilitating medical conditions may access medical marijuana if they have a prescription from a licenses Wisconsin physician?”	80%	20%
City of Racine	“Should cannabis be legalized for adult recreational use in Wisconsin?”	66%	34%
City of Racine	“Should cannabis be legalized for medical use in Wisconsin?”	88%	12%
City of Racine	“Should cannabis sales be taxed and the revenue from such taxes be used for public education, health care, and infrastructure in Wisconsin?”	83%	17%
City of Racine	“Should cannabis be decriminalized in the State of Wisconsin?”	72%	28%
City of Waukesha	“Should cannabis be legalized in Wisconsin for medicinal purposes, and regulated in the same manner as other prescription drugs?”	77%	23%

== Post-election ==
=== Accusations of gerrymandering ===
In the weeks following the election, Wisconsin's legislative districts came under wide scrutiny as an example of gerrymandering due to the fact that while Republicans won a fairly wide majority in the Wisconsin State Assembly, the Democrats garnered nearly 9 percent more of the overall statewide vote. In addition, Wisconsin was notable for being the only state in the 2018 elections where Republicans won a majority of the state's seats in the U.S. House while Democrats won a majority of the overall votes.

=== Lame duck legislative session ===
Early in December 2018, a special legislative session was called by outgoing Governor Scott Walker to pass a series of bills to limit the powers of Governor-elect Tony Evers, whom Walker had lost to in the election, as well as incoming State attorney general Josh Kaul.

Other bills being considered included restrictions on early voting and the passage of Medicaid work requirements, which Walker had previously held off on due to the election. A similar law restricting early voting that was passed several years prior had been ruled as unconstitutional.

The bills were widely denounced by Democrats and others as a “power grab.” Congresswoman Gwen Moore of Wisconsin's 4th district described the move as a “coup” that “hijacked the voters’ will.” Lawsuits were filed by Evers and various labor unions almost immediately after Walker signed the bills into law.

== See also ==
- 2018 United States elections
- 2016 Wisconsin elections
- 2018 Wisconsin gubernatorial election
- 2018 Wisconsin State Senate election
- 2018 Wisconsin State Assembly election
