= Robert Behnke =

Robert Behnke may refer to:

- Robert E. Behnke (1932–1999), member of the Wisconsin State Assembly
- Robert J. Behnke (1929–2013), American fisheries biologist and conservationist
