= Peter Bock =

American politician

Member of the Wisconsin State Assembly
- In office January 4, 1993 – January 6, 2003
- Preceded by: Gwen Moore
- Succeeded by: Peggy Krusick
- Constituency: 7th district
- In office January 5, 1987 – January 4, 1993
- Preceded by: Thomas Crawford
- Succeeded by: Walter Kunicki
- Constituency: 8th district

Personal details
- Born: December 12, 1948 (age 77) Milwaukee, Wisconsin
- Party: Democratic

Peter Bock (born December 12, 1948) is a Wisconsin politician.

Born in Milwaukee, Wisconsin, Bock graduated from Marquette University High School and from the University of Wisconsin–Milwaukee. He also went to the University of Notre Dame. Bock worked at a parcel company and was a laborer. In 1986, he was elected to the Wisconsin State Assembly serving from 1987 until 2003 as a Democrat. In late 2002, upon his retirement from the Wisconsin Assembly, he married Kathleen Falk, the County Executive of Dane County, Wisconsin.
