= Tony Staskunas =

American politician

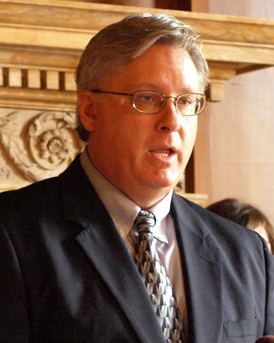
- Staskunas in 2009

Member of the Milwaukee County Board of Supervisors from the 16th district
- Incumbent
- Assumed office 2013

Member of the Wisconsin State Assembly from the 15th district
- In office January 1997 – January 7, 2013
- Preceded by: Jeannette Bell
- Succeeded by: Joe Sanfelippo

Member of the West Allis Common Council
- In office 1988–1997

Personal details
- Born: January 3, 1961 (age 65) West Allis, Wisconsin, U.S.
- Party: Democratic
- Spouse: Beth Staskunas
- Education: University of Wisconsin–Milwaukee, University of Wisconsin, Madison
- Profession: Attorney

Anthony J. Staskunas (born January 3, 1961) is an American Democratic politician and lawyer.

== Biography ==
Born in West Allis, Wisconsin, Staskunas graduated from Nathan Hale High School in West Allis. He received his bachelor's degree from University of Wisconsin–Milwaukee and his J.D. degree from University of Wisconsin Law School.

Staskunas served as an alderman on the West Allis Common Council from 1988 until 1997.

Staskunas was elected to the Wisconsin State Assembly in 1996, representing the 15th Assembly District. In April 2012, Staskunas announced his retirement from the Wisconsin State Assembly.

In April 2013, Staskunas was elected to the Milwaukee County Board of Supervisors. In 2023, he announced that he would not seek an additional term.
