= Thomas W. Meaux =

20th century American politician

Member of the Wisconsin State Assembly
- In office January 3, 1983 – November 30, 1983
- Preceded by: Phillip James Tuczynski
- Succeeded by: Tom Barrett
- Constituency: 9th Assembly district
- In office January 15, 1982 – January 3, 1983
- Preceded by: William B. Broydrick
- Succeeded by: Jeannette Bell
- Constituency: 16th Assembly district

Personal details
- Born: September 15, 1954 (age 71) Milwaukee, Wisconsin, U.S.
- Party: Democratic

Thomas W. Meaux (born September 15, 1954) is a former member of the Wisconsin State Assembly.

== Biography ==
Meaux was born on September 15, 1954, in Milwaukee, Wisconsin. He graduated from Marquette University High School before attending the University of Wisconsin–Eau Claire, California State University, Fullerton and the University of Wisconsin–Milwaukee.

== Career ==
Meaux was first elected to the Assembly in a special election on January 12, 1982. He is a Democrat.
