= Kalan Haywood =

21st century American politician (born 1999)

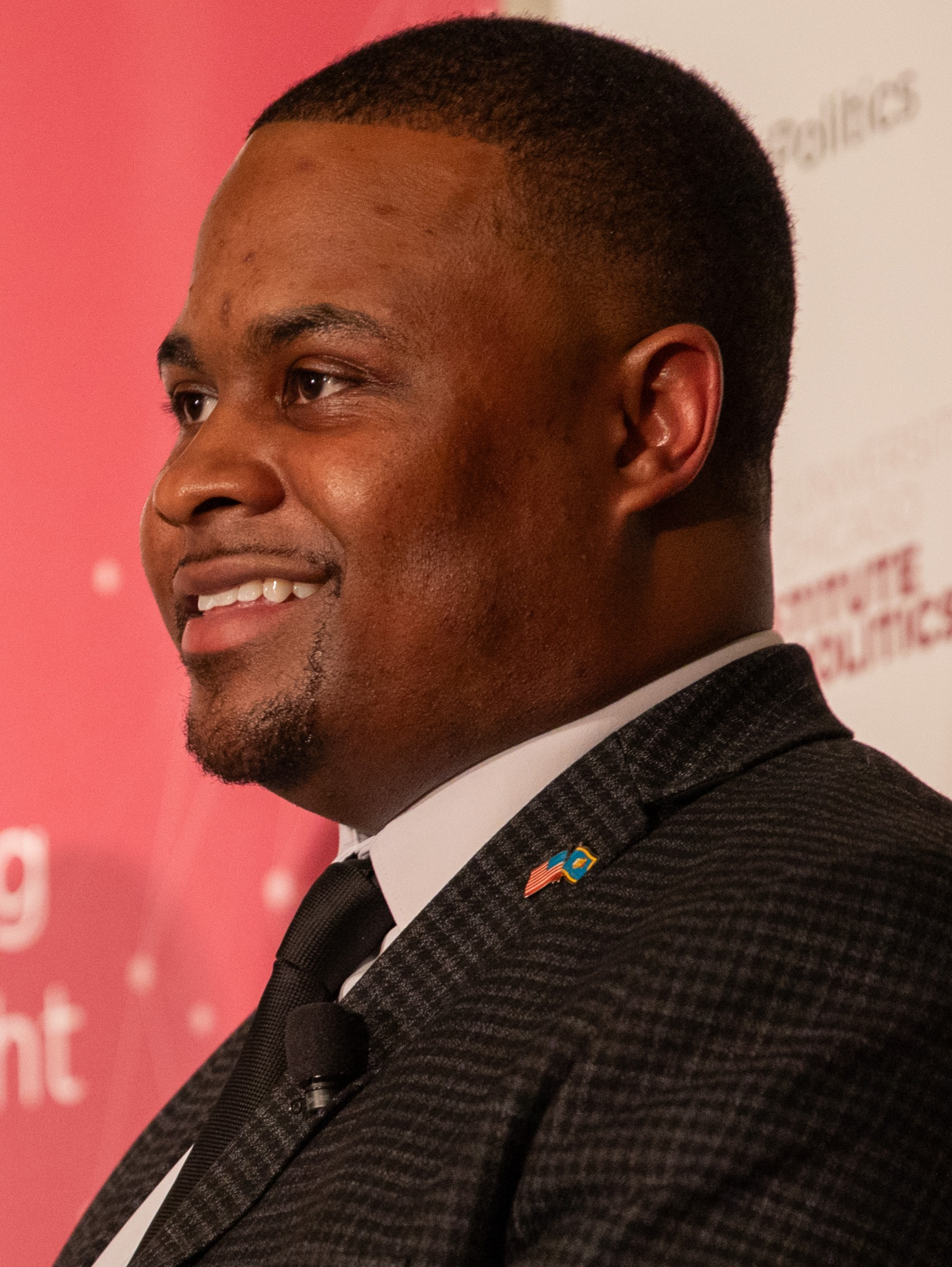

Assistant Minority Leader of the Wisconsin State Assembly
- Incumbent
- Assumed office February 11, 2022
- Leader: Greta Neubauer
- Preceded by: Dianne Hesselbein

Member of the Wisconsin State Assembly from the 16th district
- Incumbent
- Assumed office January 7, 2019
- Preceded by: Leon Young

Personal details
- Born: Kalan Haywood II; June 5, 1999 (age 27) Milwaukee, Wisconsin, U.S.
- Party: Democratic
- Education: Cardinal Stritch University; University of Wisconsin–Milwaukee
- Website: Official website

Kalan Haywood II (born June 5, 1999) is an American activist and Democratic politician from Milwaukee, Wisconsin. He is the assistant minority leader in the Wisconsin State Assembly since 2022, and has represented Wisconsin's 16th Assembly district in the Assembly since 2019.

Born in 1999, Haywood is the second youngest person ever elected to the Wisconsin Legislature (19 years old at the start of his first term), and remains one of the youngest legislators in the United States.

== Early life and education ==
Haywood was born on June 5, 1999, in Milwaukee, Wisconsin. He graduated from the Rufus King International High School and attended Cardinal Stritch University before its shutdown in 2023; he now attends the University of Wisconsin-Milwaukee, pursuing a finance major.

Haywood's father, Kalan Haywood Sr., is the founder of a real estate development firm and an influential man in Milwaukee.

== Career ==
Haywood served as president of the City of Milwaukee Youth Council. He also worked as a non-profit consultant and was a member of the City of Milwaukee Restorative Justice Advisory Committee.

Haywood was 19 years old when he won the Democratic primary election in August 2018 and the general election in November 2018, making him the youngest person serving in the Wisconsin Assembly and one of the youngest legislators in America.

In the fall of 2021, Haywood was elected by the Assembly Democratic caucus as their new assistant minority leader, following the resignation of the previous leadership team.

== Electoral history ==
=== Wisconsin Assembly (2018–present) ===
Year	Election	Date	Elected				Defeated				Total	Plurality
2018	Primary	Aug. 14	Kalan Haywood	Democratic	2,324	37.35%	Supreme Moore Omokunde	Dem.	2,079	33.41%	6,222	245
2018	Primary	Aug. 14	Kalan Haywood	Democratic	2,324	37.35%	Rick Banks	Dem.	977	15.70%	6,222	245
2018	Primary	Aug. 14	Kalan Haywood	Democratic	2,324	37.35%	Danielle McClendon-Williams	Dem.	454	7.30%	6,222	245
2018	Primary	Aug. 14	Kalan Haywood	Democratic	2,324	37.35%	Brandy Bond	Dem.	367	5.90%	6,222	245
2018	General	Nov. 6	Kalan Haywood	Democratic	16,861	98.80%	--Unopposed--				17,066	16,656
2020	General	Nov. 3	Kalan Haywood (inc)	Democratic	17,664	88.91%	Dennis C. Walton	Ind.	2,153	10.84%	19,867	15,511
2022	General	Nov. 8	Kalan Haywood (inc)	Democratic	14,158	98.75%	--Unopposed--				14,337	13,979
2024	General	Nov. 5	Kalan Haywood (inc)	Democratic	20,079	98.67%	--Unopposed--				20,350	19,808

Wisconsin State Assembly
Preceded by Leon Young	Member of the Wisconsin State Assembly from the 16th district January 7, 2019 – present	Incumbent
