= Wisconsin's 8th Assembly district =

American legislative district in Milwaukee, Wisconsin

Wisconsin's 8th State Assembly district
- 2024 map defined in 2023 Wisc. Act 94; 2022 map defined in Johnson v. Wisconsin Elections Commission; 2011 map was defined in 2011 Wisc. Act 43
Assemblymember
Sylvia Ortiz-Velez; D–Milwaukee
since January 4, 2021 (5 years, 309 days)
- Demographics: 19.84% White; 11.02% Black; 65.9% Hispanic; 3.74% Asian; 4.31% Native American; 0.17% Hawaiian/Pacific Islander
- Population (2020) • Voting age: 59,362; 40,439
- Website: Official website
- Notes: Central Milwaukee County

The 8th Assembly district of Wisconsin is one of 99 districts in the Wisconsin State Assembly. Located in southeast Wisconsin, the district is entirely contained within Milwaukee County. It comprises part of the city of Milwaukee's near-south side, including the Walker's Point Historic District, the Historic Mitchell Street neighborhood, and most of Lincoln Village. The district also contains St. Adalbert's Church, the Basilica of St. Josaphat, and St. Stanislaus Catholic Church, the historic epicenter of Milwaukee's Polish American community. The district is represented by Democrat Sylvia Ortiz-Velez, since January 2021.

The 8th Assembly district is located within Wisconsin's 3rd Senate district, along with the 7th and 9th Assembly districts.

== History ==
The district was created in the 1972 redistricting act (1971 Wisc. Act 304) which first established the numbered district system, replacing the previous system which allocated districts to specific counties. The 8th district was drawn in a new configuration crossing four of the former Milwaukee County Assembly districts, with about half of the new district's territory coming from the former Milwaukee 11th district. Although the configuration of the district has changed over the decades, it has always been located on the south side of the city of Milwaukee—with the exception of the 1983 session, under the federal maps which temporarily scrambled the Wisconsin Assembly districts. The district has been anchored with Walker's Point as its northeast boundary since the 1992 redistricting.

Notable former representatives of this district include John Norquist, the 43rd mayor of Milwaukee, Walter Kunicki, the 71st speaker of the Wisconsin Assembly, and Pedro Colón, the first Latino member of the Wisconsin Legislature and the first Latino judge of the Wisconsin Court of Appeals.

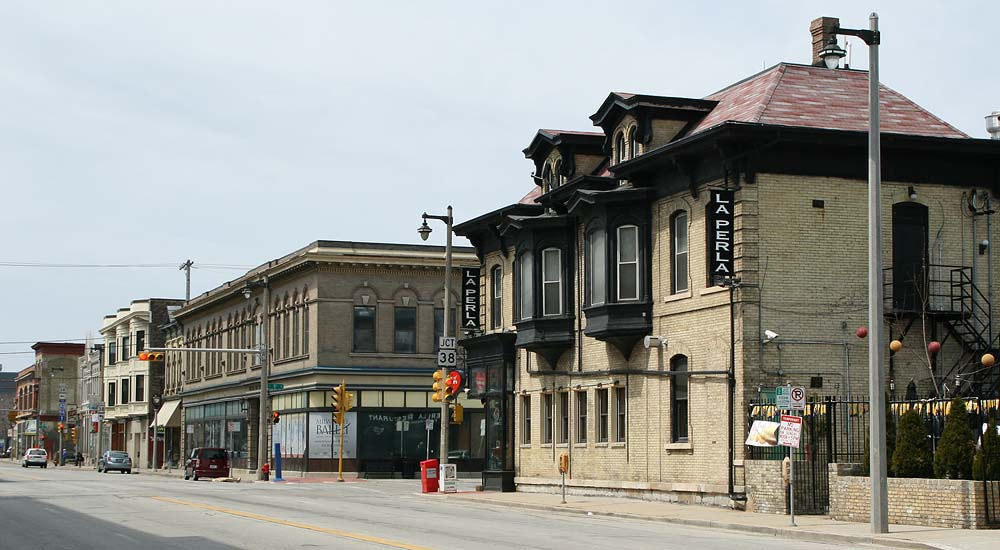
Walker's Point Historic District

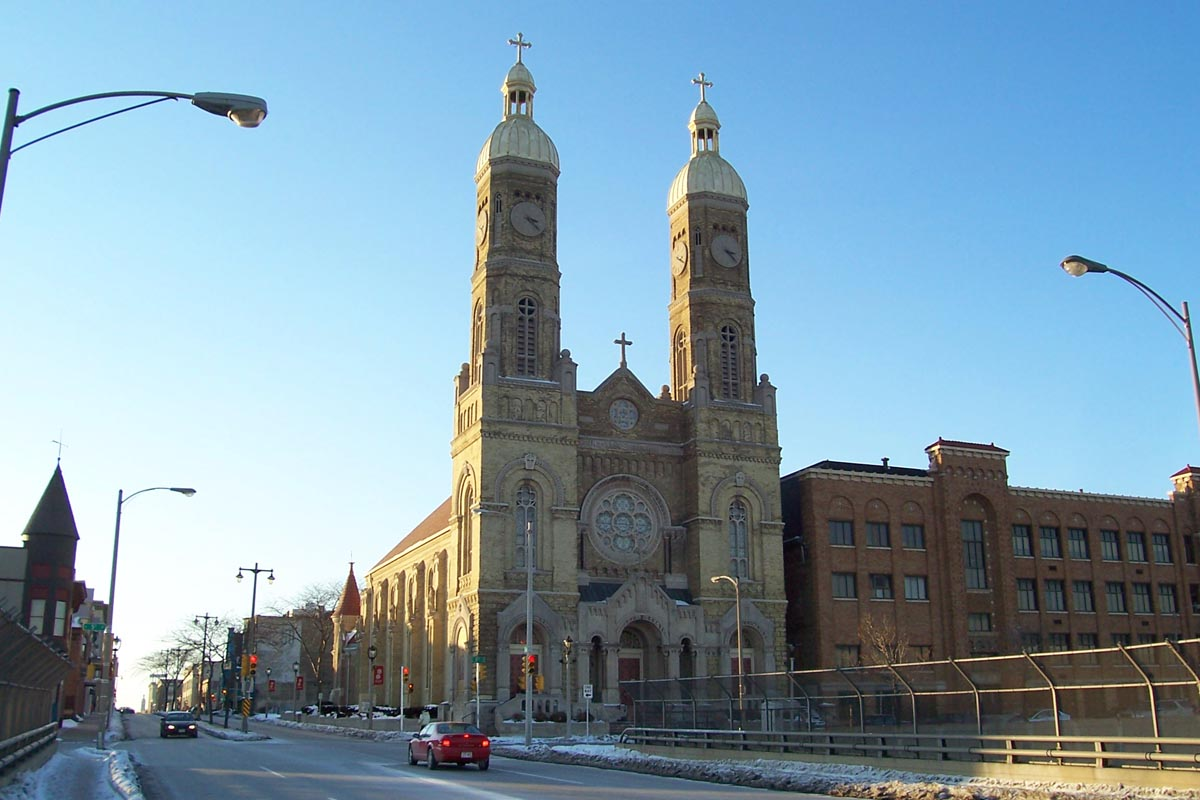
St. Stanislaus Catholic Church

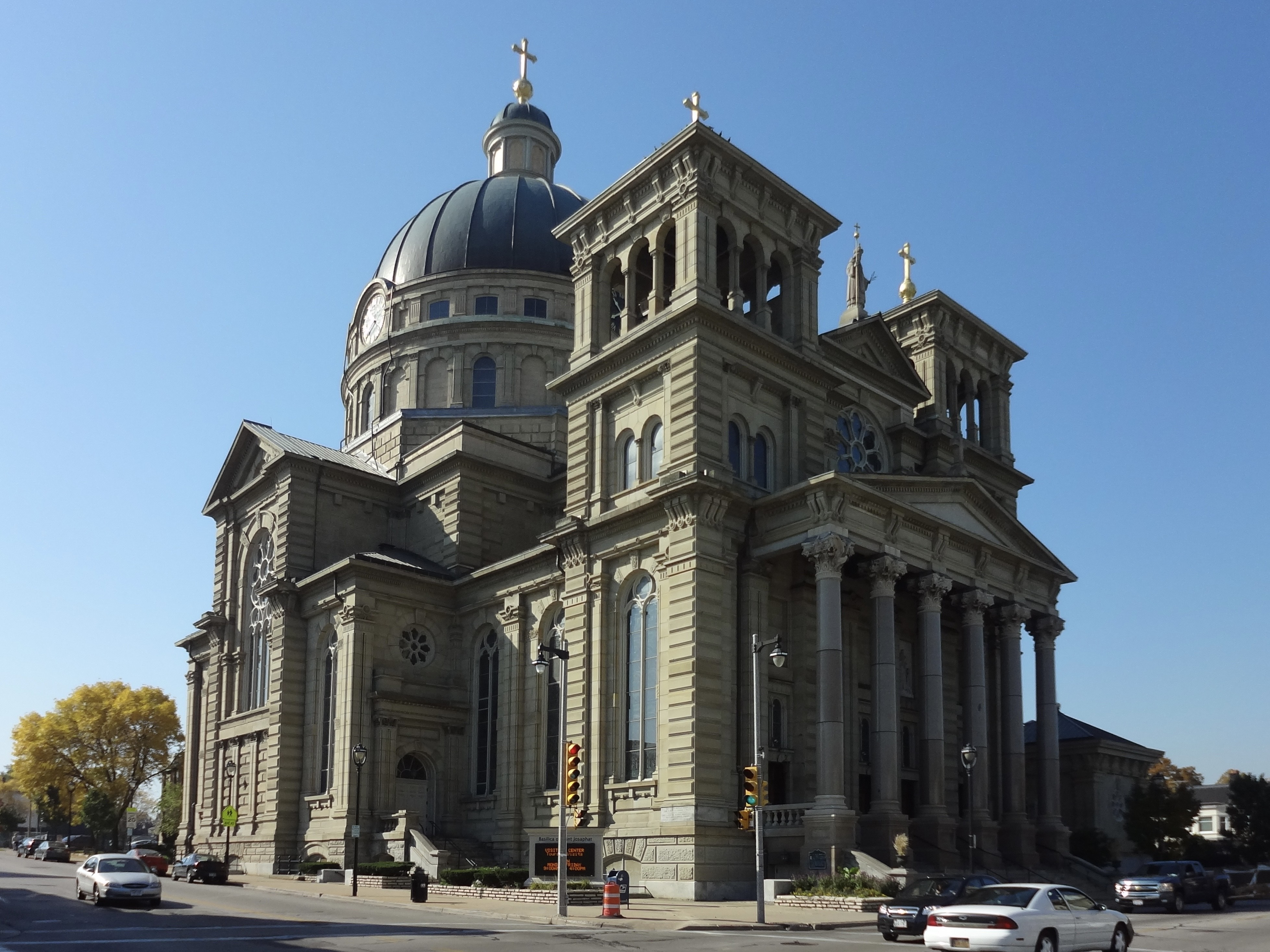
Basilica of St. Josaphat

== List of past representatives ==
List of representatives to the Wisconsin State Assembly from the 8th district
Member	Party	Residence	Counties represented	Term start	Term end	Ref.
District created
Earl Keegan Jr.	Democratic	Milwaukee	Milwaukee County	January 1, 1973	January 6, 1975	
John Norquist	Democratic	Milwaukee	Milwaukee County	January 6, 1975	January 3, 1983	
Lois Plous	Democratic	Milwaukee	Milwaukee County	January 3, 1983	January 7, 1985	
Thomas Crawford	Democratic	Milwaukee	Milwaukee County	January 7, 1985	January 5, 1987	
Peter Bock	Democratic	Milwaukee	Milwaukee County	January 5, 1987	January 4, 1993	
Walter Kunicki	Democratic	Milwaukee	Milwaukee County	January 4, 1993	January 1, 1999	
Pedro Colón	Democratic	Milwaukee	Milwaukee County	January 1, 1999	September 20, 2010	
--Vacant--			Milwaukee County	September 20, 2010	January 3, 2011	
JoCasta Zamarripa	Democratic	Milwaukee	Milwaukee County	January 3, 2011	January 4, 2021	
Sylvia Ortiz-Velez	Democratic	Milwaukee	Milwaukee County	January 4, 2021	Current	
Ismael Luna	Democratic	Milwaukee	Milwaukee County	Taking office January 2027		
