= 2027 Wisconsin Supreme Court election =

- April 6, 2027
Incumbent Justice
Annette Ziegler

The 2027 Wisconsin Supreme Court election will be held on April 6, 2027, to elect a justice of the Wisconsin Supreme Court for a ten-year term. Incumbent justice Annette Ziegler has announced that she will not run for re-election after serving on the court since August 2007. The filing deadline to appear on the ballot is January 1, 2027.

Because liberal justices already hold a 5–2 majority, the 2027 election is not expected to change the court's ideological majority. However, due to Ziegler aligning with the conservative minority on the court, a liberal victory would result in the court having a 6–1 liberal majority, likely solidifying the ideological lean of the court until at least 2033.

== Background ==
The Wisconsin Supreme Court tipped from a 4–3 conservative majority to a 4–3 liberal majority due to the 2023 Wisconsin Supreme Court election, which at that time was the most expensive judicial election in history. The liberals retained their 4–3 majority in the 2025 Wisconsin Supreme Court election, when that race surpassed 2023 to become the most expensive judicial election in history. The liberals increased their majority to 5–2 after the 2026 Wisconsin Supreme Court election, which secured a liberal majority until 2030.

The incumbent in 2027, Annette Ziegler, is a member of the conservative minority, and therefore the outcome of the election will not change the court's controlling ideology. If a liberal-backed candidate wins this race, it will result in a 6–1 liberal majority, solidifying their majority through at least 2033.

Ziegler announced in March 2026 that she would not run for re-election. This will be the fourth consecutive Wisconsin Supreme Court election without an incumbent on the ballot, an unprecedented streak.

== Candidates ==
=== Declared ===
- Lyndsey Brunette, (Note: Described by media outlets as liberal) Clark County circuit judge (2018–present) and former Clark County district attorney (2012–2016)
- Pedro Colón, (Note: Described by media outlets as liberal) Wisconsin Court of Appeals judge (2023–present) and former state representative (1999–2011)

=== Declined ===
- Shelley Grogan, Wisconsin Court of Appeals judge (2021–present)
- Annette Ziegler, (Note: Described by media outlets as conservative) incumbent Supreme Court justice (2007–present)

== Endorsements ==
Lyndsey Brunette

Statewide officials

- Barbara Lawton, former lieutenant governor of Wisconsin (2003–2011) (Democratic)

State legislators

- Jamie Wall, state senator from the 30th district (2025–present) (Democratic)
Pedro Colón

U.S. representatives

- Gwen Moore, WI-4 (2005–present) (Democratic)
- Mark Pocan, WI-2 (2013–present) (Democratic)

Statewide officials

- Jim Doyle, former governor of Wisconsin (2003–2011) (Democratic)

Judicial officials

- Louis Butler, former justice of the Wisconsin Supreme Court (2004–2008)
- Chris Taylor, justice of the Wisconsin Supreme Court (2026–present)

== See also ==
- 2027 Wisconsin elections
