= Lyndsey Brunette =

American judge (born 1983)

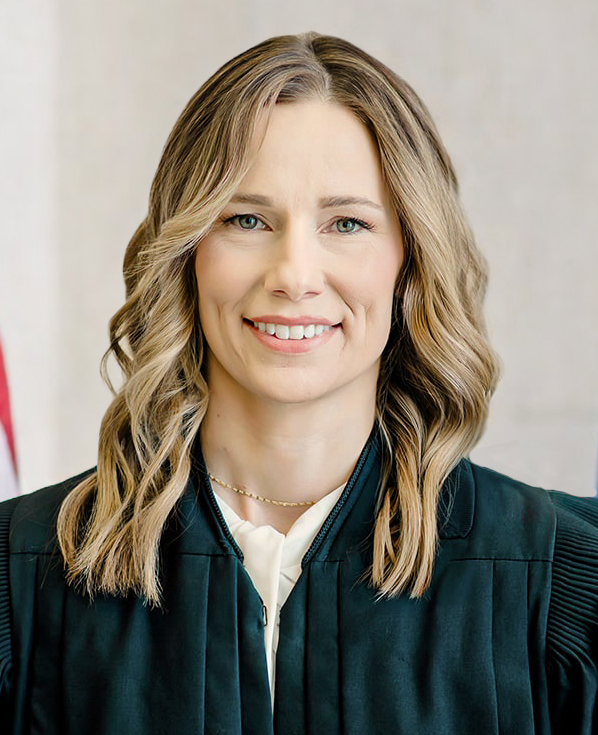

Judge of the Clark County Circuit Court Branch 1
- Incumbent
- Assumed office August 1, 2018
- Preceded by: Jon M. Counsell

District Attorney of Clark County, Wisconsin
- In office January 1, 2013 – January 1, 2017
- Preceded by: Darwin Zweig
- Succeeded by: Kerra Stumbris

Personal details
- Born: Lyndsey Boon; January 4, 1983 (age 43) Marshfield, Wisconsin, U.S.
- Party: Democratic
- Spouse: Jacob Brunette (m. 2007)
- Children: 5
- Education: University of Wisconsin, Eau Claire (BA); William Mitchell College of Law (JD)
- Website: Campaign website

Lyndsey Brunette (née Boon; born January 4, 1983) is an American lawyer and judge from Clark County, Wisconsin. She is a Wisconsin circuit court judge for Clark County since 2018, and previously served four years as district attorney of Clark County (2013–2017). She is a candidate for Wisconsin Supreme Court in the 2027 Wisconsin Supreme Court election.

Before winning elected office, she also served as a legal assistant in the county attorney's office in Hennepin County, Minnesota, under then-county attorney Amy Klobuchar, and served as corporation counsel for Clark County, Wisconsin. Earlier in her career, she used both her maiden name and married name, going by Lyndsey Boon Brunette, and her name appeared that way on the ballot for her 2012, 2018, and 2024 elections.

== Early life and education ==
Lyndsey Brunette was born Lyndsey Boon at Marshfield, Wisconsin, in January 1983. She was raised and educated and has lived most of her life in the vicinity of Neillsville, Wisconsin. After graduating from Neillsville High School in 2001, she went on to attend University of Wisconsin–Eau Claire, where she earned a bachelor's degree in criminal justice in 2005.

She immediately continued her education, pursuing her J.D. at William Mitchell College of Law, in Saint Paul, Minnesota. While in law school, she was also employed as an assistant in the county attorney's office in Hennepin County, Minnesota, under then-county attorney Amy Klobuchar. In the county attorney's office, she worked in the Gang Unit and the Adult Violent Crimes division.

== Early public offices ==
After completing law school, Brunette returned to the Neillsville area and was employed as corporation counsel for the government of Clark County, Wisconsin. In 2012, she announced that she would enter the open seat race for district attorney of Clark County, running on the Democratic Party ticket. She was opposed in the general election by Republican attorney Shari Post, but Brunette received an enthusiastic endorsement from the outgoing district attorney, Darwin Zwieg. Brunette prevailed, winning nearly 60% of the vote and running far ahead of other Democrats on the ballot in Clark County, including President Barack Obama, who—on the same ballot—received 44% of the vote in Clark County on his way to winning re-election. Brunette was the first woman to serve as Clark County district attorney.

While serving as district attorney, in 2014, Brunette was appointed special prosecutor to investigate the case of Wisconsin Rapids mayor Zach Vruwink. Vruwink had posted a photo of his completed ballot in the February 2014 spring primary election—an act which technically violated a 19th-century state law designed to discourage vote-buying schemes. The issue was raised in a legal complaint from conservative activist and unsuccessful Wisconsin Rapids city council candidate Steve Abrahamson, and resulted in the appointment of Brunette as a special prosecutor from outside the affected county. Brunette quickly concluded that Vruwink had no criminal intent, and the issue was not worth prosecutorial attention.

Brunette announced she would not run for re-election in 2016, choosing to spend time with her young and growing family. She was succeeded by assistant district attorney Kerra Stumbris, who was unopposed in the election.

== Wisconsin courts (2017–present) ==
Brunette worked as a family court commissioner after leaving the district attorney's office. Less than a year after leaving office, however, she announced that she would run for the Wisconsin circuit court seat in Clark County being vacated by the retirement of judge Jon Counsell. One other candidate filed to run for the office, attorney Roberta Heckes. Brunette again received glowing recommendations from her colleagues in county office, including the county corporation counsel, the county clerk of courts, and her predecessor as district attorney. Brunette won the April election by a wide margin, receiving over 75% of the vote.

She was sworn in as judge on August 1, 2018, and was re-elected without opposition in 2024.

In the spring of 2025, Brunette began to contact allies around the state as she considered a run for Wisconsin Supreme Court, seeking to challenge incumbent justice Rebecca Bradley in the 2026 election. A week after the initial report, however, in May 2025, she announced that she would pass on the 2026 race. Liberal candidate Chris Taylor ran instead in 2026, and Rebecca Bradley ultimately withdrew from the race; Taylor went on to win a landslide victory. Shortly after the April 2026 election, Brunette announced she would run in the 2027 Wisconsin Supreme Court election, when another open seat will be on the ballot. As a former Democratic elected official, she is considered a liberal candidate for the court.

== Personal life and family ==
Lyndsey Boon took the last name Brunette when she married Jake Brunette in 2008. They have five children, and still reside in the Neillsville area.

== Electoral history ==
=== Clark County District Attorney (2012) ===
Year	Election	Date	Elected				Defeated				Total	Plurality
2012	General	Nov. 6	Lyndsey Boon Brunette	Democratic	7,615	58.59%	Shari L. Post	Rep.	5,377	41.37%	12,998	2,238

=== Wisconsin Circuit Court (2018, 2024) ===
Year	Election	Date	Elected				Defeated				Total	Plurality
2018	General	Apr. 3	Lyndsey Boon Brunette	Nonpartisan	4,028	76.40%	Roberta A. Heckes	Non.	1,240	23.52%	5,272	2,788
2024	General	Apr. 2	Lyndsey Boon Brunette (inc)	Nonpartisan	4,991	99.11%	--unopposed--				5,036	4,946
