= Pedro Colón =

American politician and judge (born 1968)

Judge of the Wisconsin Court of Appeals for the 1st district
- Incumbent
- Assumed office November 20, 2023
- Appointed by: Tony Evers
- Preceded by: Timothy Dugan

Judge of the Milwaukee County Circuit Court Branch 18
- In office September 20, 2010 – November 20, 2023
- Appointed by: Jim Doyle
- Preceded by: Patricia McMahon
- Succeeded by: Ronnie Murray

Member of the Wisconsin State Assembly from the 8th district
- In office January 1, 1999 – September 20, 2010
- Preceded by: Walter Kunicki
- Succeeded by: JoCasta Zamarripa

Personal details
- Born: April 7, 1968 (age 58) Ponce, Puerto Rico
- Party: Democratic
- Spouse: Betty Ulmer
- Children: 2
- Education: Marquette University (BA); University of Wisconsin, Madison (JD)

Pedro A. Colón (born April 7, 1968) is an American lawyer, jurist, and Democratic politician from Milwaukee, Wisconsin. He is a judge of the Wisconsin Court of Appeals in the Milwaukee-based 2nd district since November 2023. He previously served 13 years as a Wisconsin circuit court judge in Milwaukee County. He is a candidate for Wisconsin Supreme Court in the 2027 election.

Prior to his judicial service, he was a member of the Wisconsin State Assembly for six terms, representing Wisconsin's 8th Assembly district from 1999 to 2010. He was the first Latino elected to the Wisconsin Legislature and the first Latino to judge on the Wisconsin Court of Appeals.

== Early life and education ==
Born in Ponce, Puerto Rico, April 7, 1968, Colón grew up on the South Side of Milwaukee and graduated from Milwaukee's Thomas More High School. He received his B.A. in political science from Marquette University in 1991, and his J.D. from the University of Wisconsin Law School in 1994.

== Political career ==
He was first elected to the State Assembly in 1998, making him the first Latino to be elected a member of either house of the Wisconsin Legislature; he was reelected in the next five elections. He served as vice-chair of the Joint Committee on Finance and of the Judiciary and Ethics Committee.

In 2003, he briefly entered the race for the 2004 Milwaukee mayoral election, but he withdrew from the race before the filing deadline; he endorsed and became a campaign co-chair to U.S. representative Tom Barrett, who went on to win the mayoral race. In 2008, Colón also made an unsuccessfully run for Milwaukee city attorney, challenging incumbent Grant Langley.

On May 26, 2010, Colón announced that he would not run for another term in the State Assembly; he also resigned from the Milwaukee Metropolitan Sewerage District Commission, which he once chaired. The next day, he confirmed that he was applying for a job as the deputy director of legal services at the Sewerage District, and had resigned to avoid a potential conflict of interest.

== Wisconsin courts ==
In September 2010, Governor Jim Doyle appointed Colón a Wisconsin circuit court judge for Milwaukee County. He was elected to a full term in the April 5, 2011, spring election, and was subsequently re-elected in 2017 and 2023.

Just after the 2023 election, Wisconsin Court of Appeals judge Timothy Dugan announced he would not run for re-election in 2024. Colón announced his campaign to succeed Dugan in May 2023. Dugan subsequently announced he would leave office early, in November 2023. Governor Tony Evers then appointed Colón to succeed Dugan in November to finish out the remaining year of his term. Colón was the first Latino to serve on the Wisconsin Court of Appeals.

When Wisconsin Supreme Court justice Ann Walsh Bradley announced that she would not run for re-election in 2025, Colón was discussed as a possible candidate to succeed her, but he ultimately did not enter that race. He was again suggested as a possible candidate in the 2026 Wisconsin Supreme Court election, but again deferred, endorsing his former Assembly colleague Chris Taylor. Shortly after Taylor's victory in the April 2026 election, Colón announced that he would run for state Supreme Court in the 2027 election.

== Personal life ==
He is married to Betty J. Ulmer; they have two daughters, Lily and Julia, and live in Walker's Point. Judge Colón is on the board of directors of the National Association of Latino Elected Officials.

Wisconsin State Assembly
Preceded by Walter Kunicki	Member of the Wisconsin State Assembly from the 8th district January 1, 1999 – September 20, 2010	Succeeded by JoCasta Zamarripa
Legal offices
Preceded by Patricia McMahon	Wisconsin Circuit Judge for the Milwaukee County Circuit, Branch 18; September 20, 2010 – November 20, 2023	Succeeded by Ronnie Murray
Preceded by Timothy Dugan	Judge of the Wisconsin Court of Appeals for the 1st district November 20, 2023 – present	Incumbent
