= Wisconsin's 15th Assembly district =

American legislative district in Waukesha County, Wisconsin

Wisconsin's 15th State Assembly district
- 2024 map defined in 2023 Wisc. Act 94; 2022 map defined in Johnson v. Wisconsin Elections Commission; 2011 map was defined in 2011 Wisc. Act 43
Assemblymember
Adam Neylon; R–Pewaukee
since January 6, 2025 (1 years)
- Demographics: 83.64% White; 2.12% Black; 4.06% Hispanic; 8.62% Asian; 0.96% Native American; 0.08% Hawaiian/Pacific Islander
- Population (2020) • Voting age: 59,411; 46,760
- Website: Official website
- Notes: Milwaukee metro area

The 15th Assembly district of Wisconsin is one of 99 districts in the Wisconsin State Assembly. Located in southeastern Wisconsin, the district comprises part of eastern Waukesha County. It contains all of the city of Pewaukee, and the village of Pewaukee, along with most of the city of Brookfield, and part of the city of Waukesha. The district also contains Waukesha County Technical College, Brookfield Square mall, and Capitol Airport. The district is represented by Republican Adam Neylon, since January 2025; Neylon previously represented the 98th district from April 2013 to January 2025.

The 15th Assembly district is located within Wisconsin's 5th Senate district, along with the 13th and 14th Assembly districts.

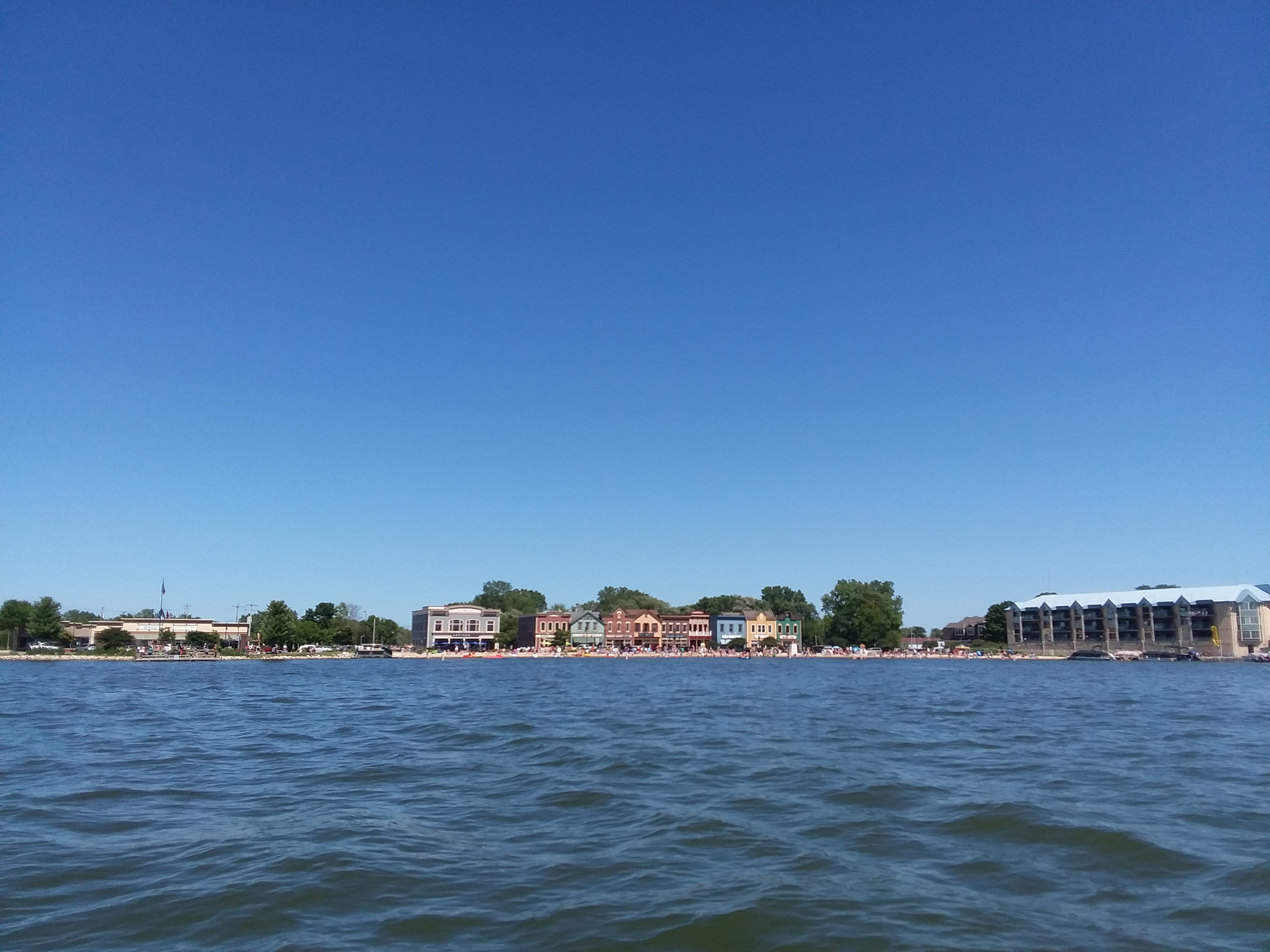
Pewaukee lakefront

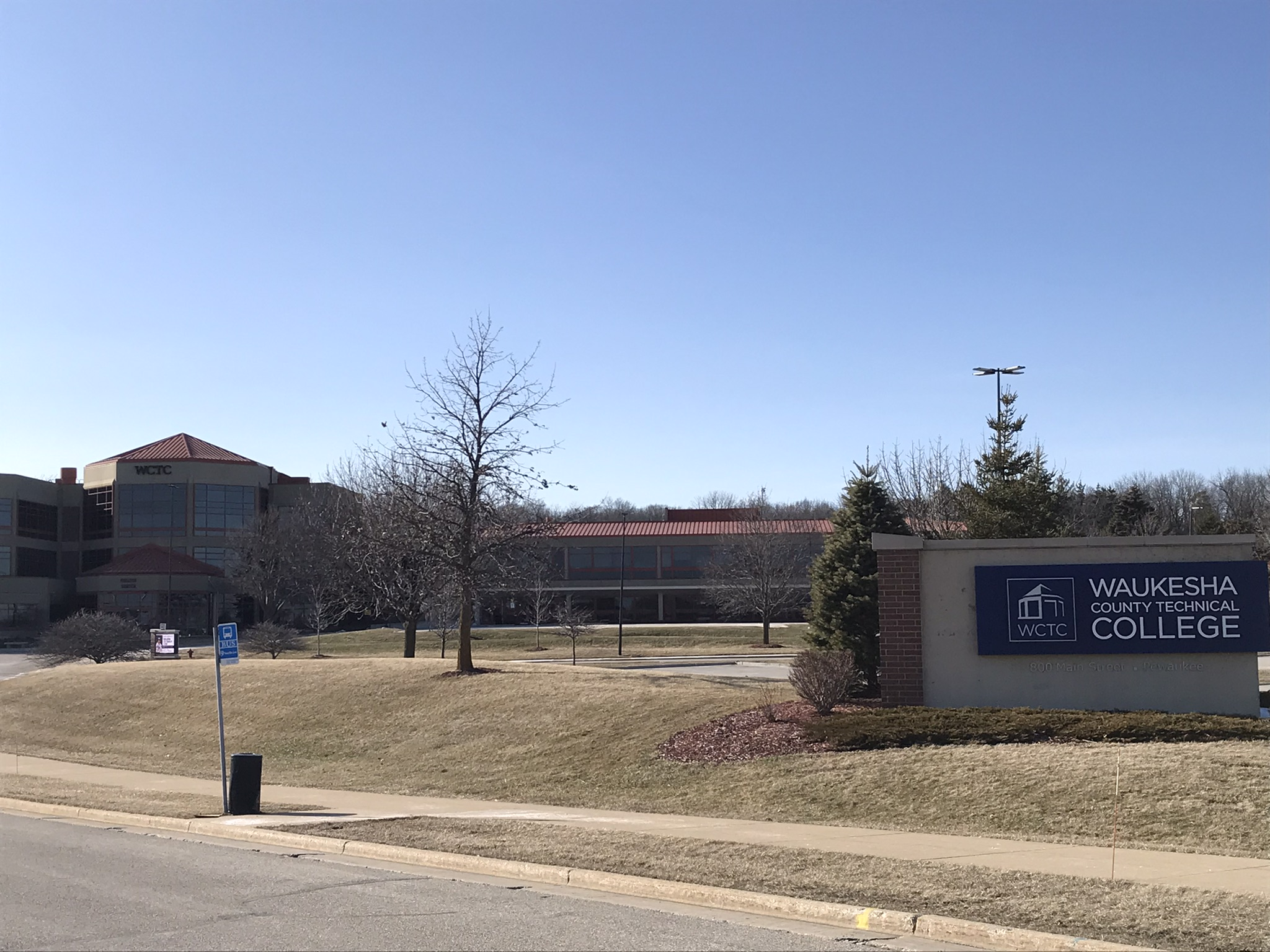
Waukesha County Technical College

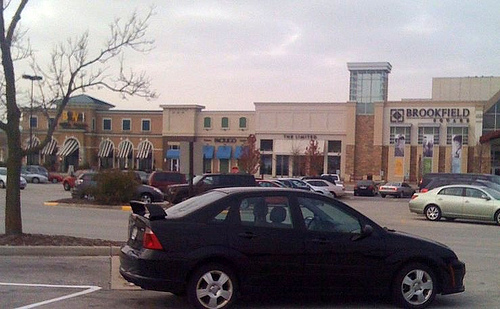
Brookfield Square

== List of past representatives ==
List of representatives to the Wisconsin State Assembly from the 15th district
Member	Party	Residence	Counties represented	Term start	Term end	Ref.
District created
James W. Wahner	Dem.	Milwaukee	Milwaukee County	January 1, 1973	January 26, 1980	
--Vacant--			Milwaukee County	January 26, 1980	April 30, 1980	
Lois Plous	Dem.	Milwaukee	Milwaukee County	April 30, 1980	January 3, 1983	
Walter Kunicki	Dem.	Milwaukee	Milwaukee County	January 3, 1983	January 7, 1985	
Shirley Krug	Dem.	Milwaukee	Milwaukee County	January 7, 1985	January 4, 1993	
Jeannette Bell	Dem.	West Allis	Milwaukee County	January 4, 1993	January 6, 1997	
Tony Staskunas	Dem.	West Allis	Milwaukee County	January 6, 1997	January 7, 2013	
Joe Sanfelippo	Rep.	New Berlin	Milwaukee, Waukesha	January 7, 2013	January 2, 2023	
Dave Maxey	Rep.	New Berlin	Milwaukee, Waukesha	January 3, 2023	January 6, 2025	
Adam Neylon	Rep.	Pewaukee	Waukesha County	January 6, 2025	Current	
