= Michael Elconin =

American politician (born 1953)

Member of the Wisconsin State Assembly from the 16th district
- In office January 1, 1973 – November 14, 1977
- Preceded by: District created
- Succeeded by: William B. Broydrick

Personal details
- Born: June 20, 1953 (age 73) Cleveland, Ohio, U.S.
- Party: Democratic

Michael Elconin (born June 20, 1953) is an American politician, investor, and technology consultant. He was a member of the Wisconsin State Assembly, representing the part of the north side of the city of Milwaukee during the 1970s. He was later executive secretary to Wisconsin Governor Martin J. Schreiber. He was the youngest member ever elected to the Wisconsin Legislature, and was just 19 years old when sworn in in January 1973.

== Biography ==
Born in Cleveland, Ohio, Elconin was elected to the Wisconsin State Assembly, as a Democrat, from Milwaukee, Wisconsin, in 1972, serving from 1973 to 1977. Elconin was elected to the Wisconsin State Legislature at age nineteen, defeating a 10-year incumbent, Joseph E. Jones, in the Democratic primary on September 12, 1972, and winning the general election on November 7, 1972. He is to this day the youngest person ever to be elected to the Wisconsin Legislature. He was re-elected twice (1974, 1976) and in his final term chaired the Assembly Committee on Criminal Justice and Public Safety, the Joint Committee on Court Reorganization, and the Milwaukee Caucus.

Elconin resigned the legislative seat in November 1977 to become executive secretary to Wisconsin Governor Martin J. Schreiber. He later was elected to the Milwaukee School Board and served from 1979 to 1983.

Elconin founded a software company named Software Banc, Inc., based in Milwaukee, Wisconsin. The privately held company was acquired by Physician's Computer Network (ticker: PCN) in 1997.

He is currently an investor and technology consultant in San Diego, California. He served as President of the San Diego Tech Coast Angels from 2007 to 2009.

Wisconsin State Assembly
New district	Member of the Wisconsin State Assembly from the 16th district January 1, 1973 – November 14, 1977	Succeeded by William B. Broydrick
