= Wisconsin's 17th Assembly district =

American legislative district in Milwaukee, Wisconsin

Wisconsin's 17th State Assembly district
- 2024 map defined in 2023 Wisc. Act 94; 2022 map defined in Johnson v. Wisconsin Elections Commission; 2011 map was defined in 2011 Wisc. Act 43
Assemblymember
Supreme Moore Omokunde; D–Milwaukee
since January 4, 2021 (5 years)
- Demographics: 29.1% White; 61.81% Black; 4.45% Hispanic; 4.25% Asian; 1.48% Native American; 0.14% Hawaiian/Pacific Islander
- Population (2020) • Voting age: 59,435; 43,760
- Website: Official website
- Notes: Milwaukee's west side

The 17th Assembly district of Wisconsin is one of 99 districts in the Wisconsin State Assembly. Located in southeast Wisconsin, the district is entirely contained within the boundaries of the city of Milwaukee in central Milwaukee County. It comprises neighborhoods of Milwaukee's west side, including northern Enderis Park, Capitol Heights, and Lincoln Creek. It includes the historic Holy Cross Catholic Cemetery and Mount Mary University. The district is represented by Democrat Supreme Moore Omokunde, since January 2021.

The 17th Assembly district is located within Wisconsin's 6th Senate district, along with the 16th and 18th Assembly districts.

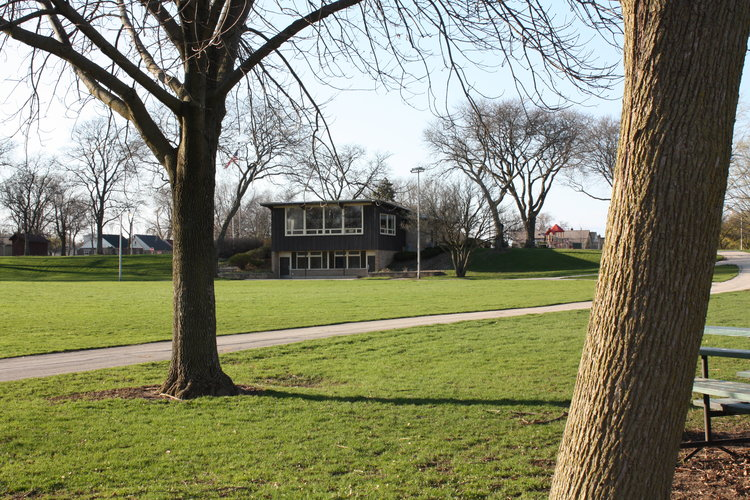
Cooper Park pavilion

== List of past representatives ==
List of representatives to the Wisconsin State Assembly from the 17th district
Member	Party	Residence	Counties represented	Term start	Term end	Ref.
District created
Walter L. Ward Jr.	Dem.	Milwaukee	Milwaukee	January 1, 1973	January 5, 1981	
Annette Polly Williams	Dem.	Milwaukee	Milwaukee	January 5, 1981	January 3, 1983	
Joseph Czarnezki	Dem.	Milwaukee	Milwaukee	January 3, 1983	April 13, 1983	
--Vacant--			Milwaukee	April 13, 1983	July 12, 1983	
Peggy Krusick	Dem.	Milwaukee	Milwaukee	July 12, 1983	January 7, 1985	
Annette Polly Williams	Dem.	Milwaukee	Milwaukee	January 7, 1985	January 4, 1993	
G. Spencer Coggs	Dem.	Milwaukee	Milwaukee	January 4, 1993	November 25, 2003	
--Vacant--			Milwaukee	November 25, 2003	February 3, 2004	
Barbara Toles	Dem.	Milwaukee	Milwaukee	February 3, 2004	July 2, 2012	
--Vacant--			Milwaukee	July 2, 2012	January 7, 2013	
LaTonya Johnson	Dem.	Milwaukee	Milwaukee	January 7, 2013	January 3, 2017	
David Crowley	Dem.	Milwaukee	Milwaukee	January 3, 2017	June 18, 2020	
--Vacant--			Milwaukee	June 18, 2020	January 4, 2021	
Supreme Moore Omokunde	Dem.	Milwaukee	Milwaukee	January 4, 2021	Current	
