= Jeannette Bell =

American politician

Mayor of West Allis, Wisconsin
- In office 1996–2008

Member of the Wisconsin State Assembly
- In office January 3, 1983 – January 1997
- Preceded by: William B. Broydrick
- Succeeded by: Tony Staskunas
- Constituency: 16th District (1983-1985); 15th District (1993-1997)

Personal details
- Born: September 2, 1941 (age 84) Milwaukee, Wisconsin
- Party: Democratic
- Education: University of Wisconsin–Milwaukee (BA)

Jeannette Lois Bell (née Jeske; born September 2, 1941) is an American Democratic politician and social worker from Wisconsin.

== Early life and education ==
Bell was born on September 2, 1941, in Milwaukee, Wisconsin. Her parents are Harold Arthur Jeske and Luella Ruth Jeske (née Block). She graduated from Rufus King International High School and received her bachelor's degree in legal studies from the University of Wisconsin–Milwaukee in 1988. She worked in a nursing home as an activities coordinator and as the supervisor of a youth employment program.

== Political career ==
From 1983 until 1997, Bell served in the Wisconsin State Assembly. In 1996, Bell resigned from the Wisconsin State Assembly to serve as Mayor of West Allis, Wisconsin until her retirement in 2008.

== Personal life ==
She married Chester Robert Bell and they have three children: Chester III, Colleen and Edith.
