= Lois Plous =

American politician

Member of the Wisconsin State Assembly
- In office April 29, 1980 – January 7, 1985
- Preceded by: John Norquist
- Succeeded by: Thomas Crawford
- Constituency: 8th District
- In office April 30, 1980 – January 3, 1983
- Preceded by: James W. Wahner
- Succeeded by: Walter Kunicki
- Constituency: 15th District

Personal details
- Born: August 14, 1938 (age 88) Milwaukee, Wisconsin
- Party: Democratic
- Education: University of Wisconsin–Milwaukee

Lois Plous (born August 14, 1938 in Milwaukee, Wisconsin.) served as a member of the Wisconsin State Assembly. She graduated from Washington High School and the University of Wisconsin–Milwaukee. Plous has two children.

== Career ==
Plous was first elected to the Assembly in a special election on April 29, 1980. She is a Democrat.
