= Wisconsin's 14th Assembly district =

American legislative district in Milwaukee County, Wisconsin

Wisconsin's 14th State Assembly district
- 2024 map defined in 2023 Wisc. Act 94; 2022 map defined in Johnson v. Wisconsin Elections Commission; 2011 map was defined in 2011 Wisc. Act 43
Assemblymember
Angelito Tenorio; D–West Allis
since January 6, 2025 (1 years)
- Demographics: 76.76% White; 6.72% Black; 10.81% Hispanic; 3.37% Asian; 2.72% Native American; 0.12% Hawaiian/Pacific Islander
- Population (2020) • Voting age: 59,463; 47,815
- Website: Official website
- Notes: Milwaukee metro area

The 14th Assembly district of Wisconsin is one of 99 districts in the Wisconsin State Assembly. Located in southeast Wisconsin, the district comprises parts of western Milwaukee County. It includes most of the city of West Allis and parts of western Milwaukee and southwest Wauwatosa. The district also contains the Wisconsin State Fair Park, Milwaukee County Zoo, Greenfield Park, and the Pettit National Ice Center. The district is represented by Democrat Angelito Tenorio, since January 2025.

The 14th Assembly district is located within Wisconsin's 5th Senate district, along with the 13th and 15th Assembly districts.

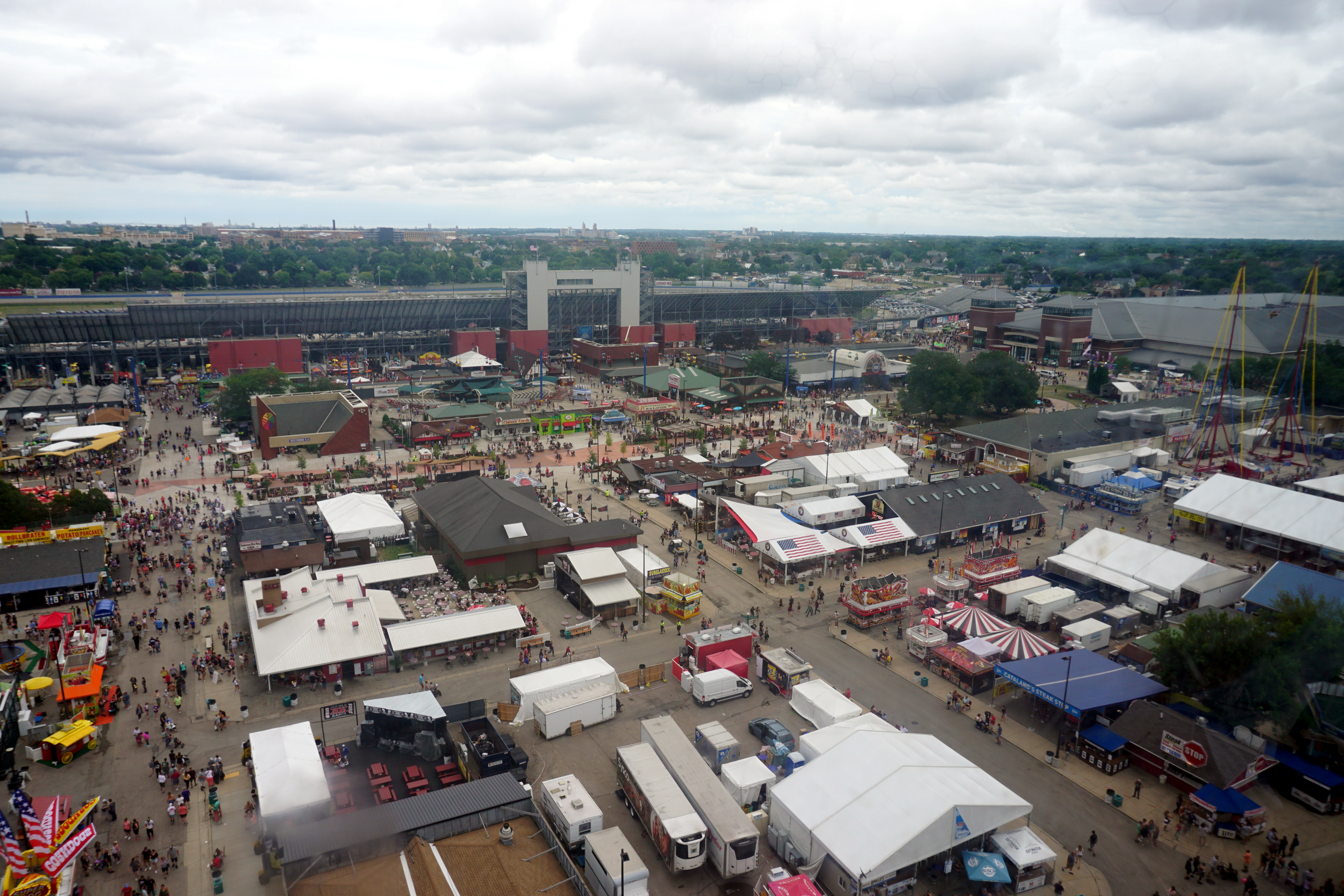
Wisconsin State Fair Park

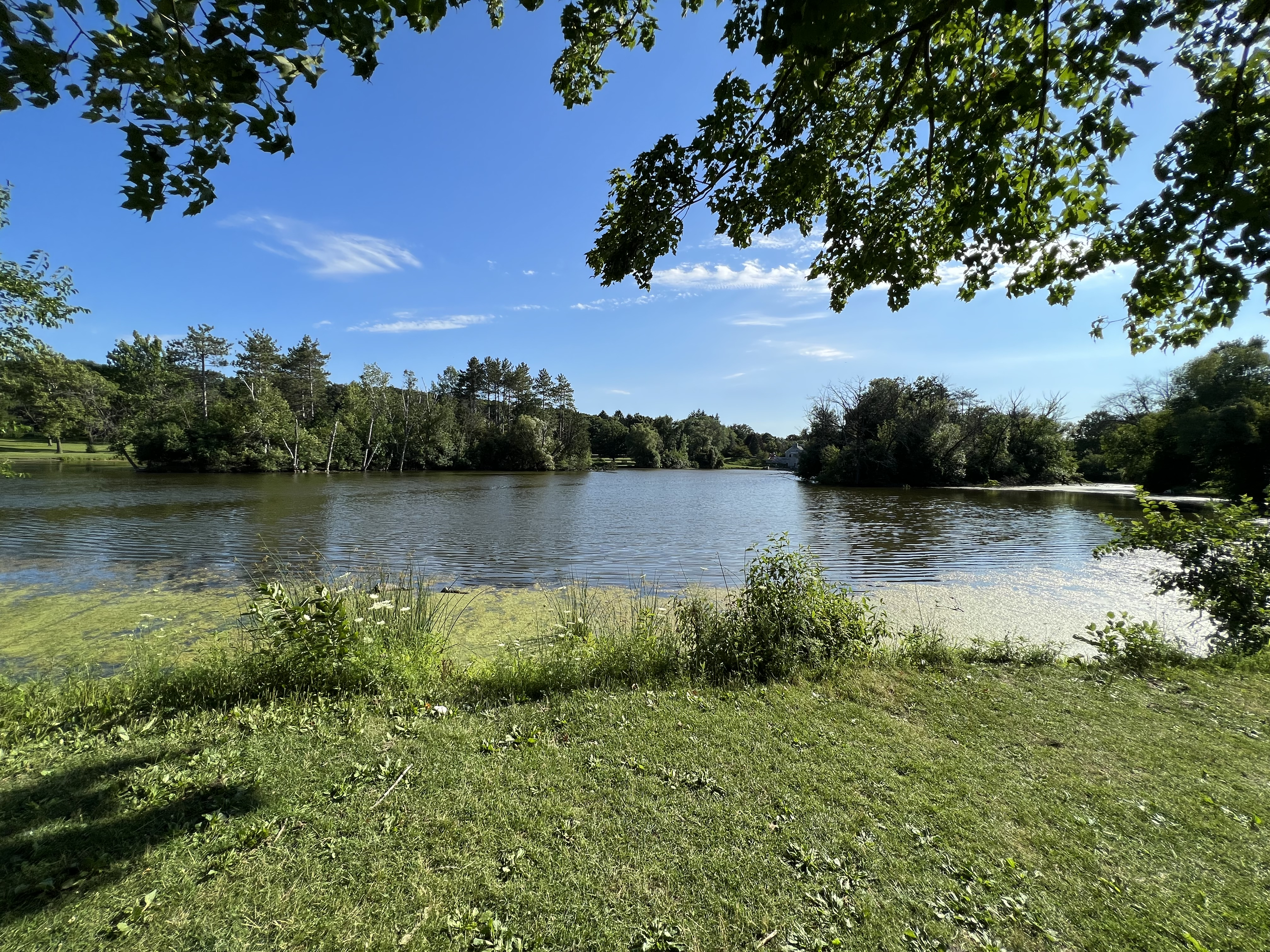
Greenfield Park

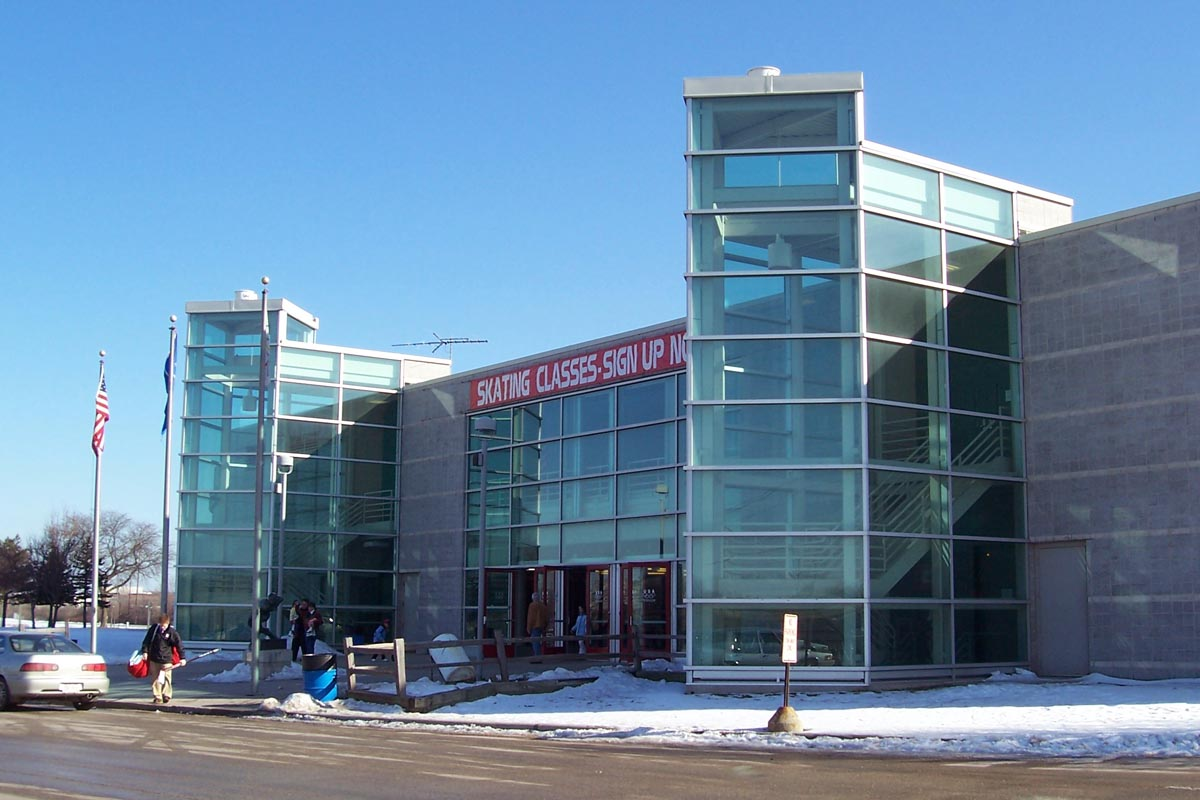
Pettit National Ice Center

== History ==
The district was created in the 1972 redistricting act (1971 Wisc. Act 304) which first established the numbered district system, replacing the previous system which allocated districts to specific counties. The 14th district was drawn mostly in line with the previous Milwaukee County 9th district, but removed all wards of the city of Glendale and added more wards from the city of Milwaukee, from what had previously been the Milwaukee County 18th district.

The district has remained in the same vicinity, but has crept south and west in redistrictings since 1972. The 2002 court-ordered redistricting was the first to extend the district into Waukesha County, when the district was drawn to comprise the eastern half of the city of Brookfield with the village of Elm Grove, in Waukesha County, along with the western half of the city of Wauwatosa and western wards of the cities of West Allis and Milwaukee, in Milwaukee County. The 2022 redistricting sought to cram more Democratic votes into this district in order to make the 13th Assembly district a more safely Republican seat, so all the Waukesha County wards were removed in favor of more of Milwaukee County. The 2024 redistricting act kept the district within Milwaukee County, but made it more compact, making it essentially a West Allis district with a few wards from neighboring Wauwatosa and Milwaukee.

Notable past representatives of the 14th Assembly district include Tom Barrett, the 44th mayor of Milwaukee, who also served in the United States House of Representatives, representing Wisconsin's 5th congressional district for five terms, and Scott Walker, who became the 45th governor of Wisconsin and was a candidate for President in the 2016 Republican Party presidential primaries.

== List of past representatives ==
List of representatives to the Wisconsin State Assembly from the 14th district
Member	Party	Residence	Counties represented	Term start	Term end	Ref.
District created
Robert E. Behnke	Dem.	Milwaukee	Milwaukee County	January 1, 1973	January 3, 1983	
Thomas J. Crawford	Dem.	Milwaukee	Milwaukee County	January 3, 1983	January 7, 1985	
Tom Barrett	Dem.	Milwaukee	Milwaukee County	January 7, 1985	December 13, 1989	
--Vacant--			Milwaukee County	December 13, 1989	May 15, 1990	
David Cullen	Dem.	Milwaukee	Milwaukee County	May 15, 1990	January 4, 1993	
Peggy Rosenzweig	Rep.	Wauwatosa	Milwaukee County	January 4, 1993	April 20, 1993	
--Vacant--			Milwaukee County	April 20, 1993	July 12, 1993	
Scott Walker	Rep.	Wauwatosa	Milwaukee County	July 12, 1993	April 30, 2002	
--Vacant--			Milwaukee County	April 30, 2002	November 5, 2002	
Leah Vukmir	Rep.	Wauwatosa	Milwaukee County	November 5, 2002	January 3, 2011	
Leah Vukmir	Rep.	Wauwatosa	Milwaukee, Waukesha	November 5, 2002	January 3, 2011	
Dale P. Kooyenga	Rep.	Brookfield	Milwaukee, Waukesha	January 3, 2011	January 7, 2019	
Robyn Vining	Dem.	Wauwatosa	Milwaukee, Waukesha	January 7, 2019	January 6, 2025	
Robyn Vining	Dem.	Wauwatosa	Milwaukee County	January 7, 2019	January 6, 2025	
Angelito Tenorio	Dem.	West Allis	Milwaukee County	January 6, 2025	Current	

== Electoral history ==
Year	Date	Elected				Defeated				Total	Plurality	Other primary candidates
2018	Nov. 6	Robyn Vining	Democratic	16,597	48.58%	Matt Adamczyk	Rep.	16,459	48.18%	34,162	138	
2018	Nov. 6	Robyn Vining	Democratic	16,597	48.58%	Rick Braun	Lib.	691	2.02%	34,162	138	
2018	Nov. 6	Robyn Vining	Democratic	16,597	48.58%	Steven Shevey	Ind.	402	1.18%	34,162	138	
2020	Nov. 3	Robyn Vining (inc)	Democratic	21,370	53.99%	Bonnie Lee	Rep.	18,186	45.95%	39,579	3,184	
2022	Nov. 8	Robyn Vining (inc)	Democratic	17,703	63.35%	Keva Turner	Rep.	10,219	36.57%	27,946	7,484	
2024	Nov. 5	Angelito Tenorio	Democratic	15,637	52.66%	Jim Engstrand	Rep.	12,896	43.43%	29,693	2,741	Nathan R. Kieso (Dem.); Brady Coulthard (Dem.)
2024	Nov. 5	Angelito Tenorio	Democratic	15,637	52.66%	Steven Shevey	Ind.	1,117	3.76%	29,693	2,741	Nathan R. Kieso (Dem.); Brady Coulthard (Dem.)
