= Thomas Crawford (Wisconsin politician) =

20th-century American politician

Member of the Wisconsin State Assembly
- In office January 7, 1985 – January 5, 1987
- Preceded by: Lois Plous
- Succeeded by: Peter Bock
- Constituency: 8th Assembly district
- In office January 3, 1983 – January 7, 1985
- Preceded by: Robert E. Behnke
- Succeeded by: Tom Barrett
- Constituency: 14th Assembly district
- In office January 3, 1981 – January 3, 1983
- Preceded by: Richard E. Pabst
- Succeeded by: Robert Goetsch
- Constituency: 33rd Assembly district

Personal details
- Born: Thomas James Crawford; July 25, 1952 (age 73) Kenosha, Wisconsin, U.S.
- Party: Democratic
- Education: University of Wisconsin–Milwaukee (B.A.); University of Wisconsin Law School (J.D.)
- Profession: Attorney

Thomas James Crawford (born July 25, 1952) is an American lawyer and former politician from Milwaukee, Wisconsin. He served three terms as a Democratic member of the Wisconsin State Assembly, representing the west side of the city of Milwaukee from 1981 to 1987. He now works as a senior staff attorney for the Milwaukee Metropolitan Sewerage District.

== Biography ==
Thomas James Crawford was born on July 25, 1952, in Kenosha, Wisconsin. He was raised and educated in Kenosha, graduating from Kenosha's Tremper High School. He went on to earn his bachelor's degree from the University of Wisconsin–Milwaukee, and then obtained his J.D. from the University of Wisconsin Law School in 1978.

== Career ==
Crawford was elected to the Assembly as a Democrat in 1980. He was re-elected in 1982 and 1984.

In 1986, Crawford considered a run for attorney general of Wisconsin, but ultimately did not enter the race. Soon after that decision, Crawford also announced that he would not run for re-election to his Assembly seat.

Shortly after leaving office, Crawford was hired as a staff attorney for the Milwaukee Metropolitan Sewerage District, remaining in that role for the next 35 years.

Wisconsin State Assembly
| Preceded by Richard E. Pabst | Member of the Wisconsin State Assembly from the 33rd district January 3, 1981 – January 3, 1983 | Succeeded by Robert Goetsch |
| Preceded by Robert E. Behnke | Member of the Wisconsin State Assembly from the 14th district January 3, 1983 – January 7, 1985 | Succeeded by Tom Barrett |
| Preceded by Lois Plous | Member of the Wisconsin State Assembly from the 8th district January 7, 1985 – January 5, 1987 | Succeeded by Peter Bock |
