= Joe Sanfelippo =

21st century American politician

Member of the Wisconsin State Assembly from the 15th district
- In office January 7, 2013 – January 2, 2023
- Preceded by: Tony Staskunas
- Succeeded by: Dave Maxey

Personal details
- Born: February 26, 1964 (age 62) Milwaukee, Wisconsin, U.S.
- Party: Republican
- Spouse: Rebecca Mane Sanfelippo
- Education: Marquette University
- Profession: Politician

Joe Sanfelippo (born February 26, 1964) is an American businessman and politician. He was a member of the Wisconsin State Assembly, representing Wisconsin's 15th Assembly district from 2013 to 2023.

== Biography ==
From West Allis, Wisconsin, Sanfelippo went to Marquette University and then opened a landscape company. Sanfelippo served on the Milwaukee County, Wisconsin Board of Supervisors. In November 2012, Sanfelippo was elected to the Wisconsin State Assembly as a Republican.

On February 13, 2020, speaking on the radio for the Wisconsin Republican Party, and in support of a crime bill, Sanfelippo stated, "FBI data shows violent crime rates increased in all but two Wisconsin cities between 2008 and 2017." The national media fact-checking organization, PolitiFact evaluated his claim and found it to be "Pants On Fire" in error. His conclusions were based on flawed data, and almost entirely false. Crime in fact had increased slightly in Milwaukee, but essentially nowhere else, according to state and FBI numbers. Some of those organizations and municipalities generating the numbers had also somewhat changed reporting systems, so it was not possible to establish Sanfelippo's claims as facts.

After Joe Biden won the 2020 presidential election, Sanfelippo made unsubstantiated claims of voter fraud and suggested that Wisconsin should ignore the results of the election and that the state's electors should choose either Trump or Biden. Sanfelipp also suggested nullifying the election results and holding a new election.

Wisconsin State Assembly
Preceded by Tony Staskunas	Member of the Wisconsin State Assembly from the 15th district January 7, 2013 – January 2, 2023	Succeeded by Dave Maxey
