= William B. Broydrick =

20th century American politician

Member of the Wisconsin State Assembly from the 16th district
- In office January 24, 1978 – November 1, 1981
- Preceded by: Michael Elconin
- Succeeded by: Thomas W. Meaux

Personal details
- Born: October 30, 1948 (age 77) Boston, Massachusetts, U.S.
- Party: Democratic

William B. Broydrick (born October 30, 1948, in Boston, Massachusetts), was a member of the Wisconsin State Assembly, serving in the 16th Assembly District. He graduated from Cornell University with a B.A. in Government in 1970 and attended Johns Hopkins University 1970–1971. Broydrick is married with one child.

== Career ==
Broydrick was first elected to the Wisconsin State Assembly in a special election in January 1978 and reelected in 1978. He is a Democrat.

Prior to his time as a legislator he served as former Congressman Les Aspin's press secretary, managed Congressman Robert Cornell's campaign, and became former Wisconsin Governor Patrick Lucey’s senior administrative assistant. In 1993, Broydrick led the Office of Legislative Affairs where he served as a consultant to the Department of Defense.

Broydrick is now the Principal Lobbyist at Broydrick & Associates, a Washington, D.C., lobbying firm founded by him and his wife in 1981. In 2018 the firm served over 20 clients in industries including pharmaceuticals, finance, agriculture, infrastructure and manufacturing.

Broydrick is listed on Marquette University's Les Aspin Center for Government National Board of Visitors.

Mr. & Mrs. Broydrick have hosted many fundraisers and dinners at their Georgetown home, including a commemorative toast to JFK who once resided in their neighborhood.

In 2007 Broydrick's phone number turned up among a list of contacts of Deborah Jeane Palfrey.

In 2010 Broydrick & Associates sold a portion of the Wisconsin lobbying firm to three of the firm's employees, which now operates as the Madison, Wisconsin-based firm Hubbard, Wilson & Zelenkova. Broydrick continues to work as a lobbyist in Washington, D.C.
