= Leon Young (Wisconsin politician) =

American politician

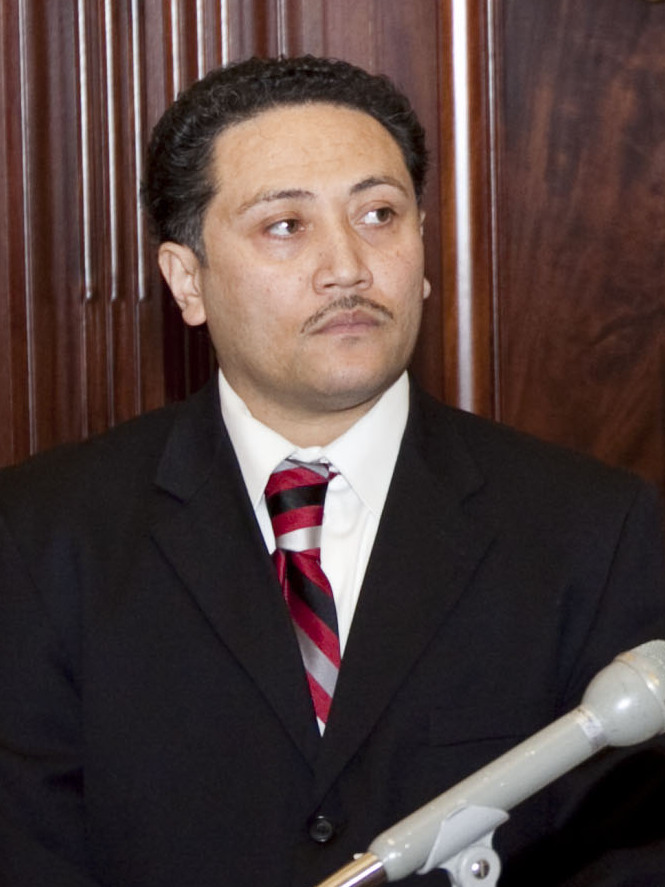
- Young in 2009

Member of the Wisconsin State Assembly from the 16th district
- In office January 4, 1993 – January 7, 2019
- Preceded by: G. Spencer Coggs
- Succeeded by: Kalan Haywood

Personal details
- Born: July 4, 1967 (age 59) Los Angeles, California
- Party: Democratic
- Occupation: former police officer

Leon D. Young (born July 4, 1967) is a police officer and former Democratic member of the Wisconsin State Assembly, representing the 16th Assembly District from 1992 until 2018.

== Political career ==
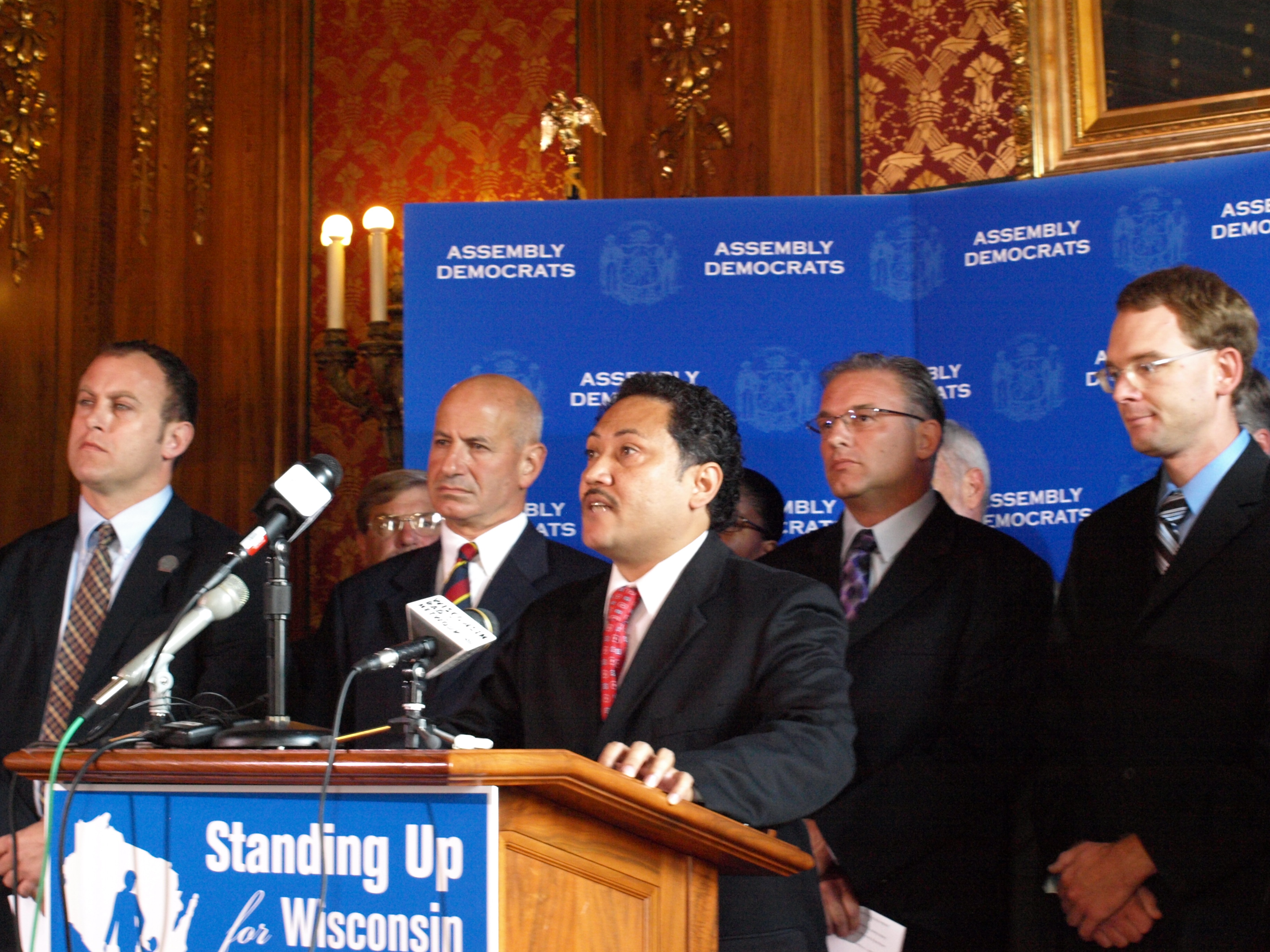
Young speaking at a 2009 press conference

In 1992, his aunt, incumbent Marcia P. Coggs (18th District), waited until just hours before the deadline for filing nomination papers to announce her retirement. Only one potential competitor had time to file nomination papers, since no challengers had planned to file against Coggs for the Democratic nomination (tantamount to election in this heavily-African-American, reliably Democratic district). (Wisconsin's statutes have been changed to prevent such a surprise being repeated.) Young was elected to his aunt's seat and has been re-elected ever since.

In 2018, Young announced that he was retiring from politics, and that he intended to resume working as a police officer.
