= Robert E. Behnke =

American politician

Member of the Wisconsin State Assembly from the 14th district
- In office January 1, 1973 – January 3, 1983
- Preceded by: District created
- Succeeded by: Thomas Crawford

Personal details
- Born: Robert E. Behnke; April 7, 1932 Milwaukee, Wisconsin, US
- Died: March 26, 1999 (aged 66)
- Party: Democratic

Robert E. Behnke (April 7, 1932, in Milwaukee, Wisconsin – March 26, 1999), was a member of the Wisconsin State Assembly. He graduated from high school in Wautoma, Wisconsin. Robert Behnke died on March 26, 1999. He was married with five children.

== Career ==
Behnke was a Democratic member of the Assembly from 1973 to 1983. He represented the 14th District.
