= John Pier Roemer =

American judge (1953–2022)

Wisconsin Circuit Court Judge for the Juneau circuit, branch 1
- In office August 1, 2004 – August 2017
- Preceded by: Dennis Schuh
- Succeeded by: Stacy A. Smith

Personal details
- Born: August 9, 1953 Milwaukee, Wisconsin, U.S.
- Died: June 3, 2022 (aged 68) New Lisbon, Wisconsin, U.S.
- Cause of death: Homicide
- Spouse: Vivian M. Schroeder (m. 1980; died 2018)
- Children: three sons
- Education: Hamline University School of Law
- Profession: Lawyer, judge

Military service
- Allegiance: United States
- Branch/service: U.S. Army Reserve
- Years of service: 1984–2002
- Rank: Lt. Colonel, USAR

John Pier "Jack" Roemer Jr. (August 9, 1953 – June 3, 2022) was an American lawyer and judge in the U.S. state of Wisconsin. He served 13 years as Wisconsin circuit court judge for Juneau County. He was assassinated in 2022, five years after retiring from the court.

== Biography ==
John Pier Roemer Jr. was born in Milwaukee, Wisconsin, in August 1953. He attended Hamline University School of Law, in St. Paul, Minnesota, and graduated in 1983. He worked as an attorney in private practice for several years, and also worked as a public defender in Baraboo, Wisconsin. He was commissioned as an officer in the United States Army Reserve around this time and served in the Reserves until retiring as a lieutenant colonel in 2002.

In 1992, he was hired as an assistant district attorney in Juneau County, Wisconsin, under district attorney Dennis Schuh. He and Schuh worked together until the death of Juneau County Wisconsin circuit court judge John W. Brady in 2003. After Brady's death, Governor Jim Doyle appointed Schuh to the vacant judgeship. With Schuh's elevation, Roemer became acting district attorney, but soon announced his own candidacy for the judgeship, challenging Schuh in the Spring 2004 election.

Roemer prevailed in the election, receiving 62% of the vote. He took office in August 2004 and was re-elected without opposition in 2010 and 2016. He retired shortly after the start of his third term, in August 2017, to spend more time with his ailing wife.

== Assassination ==
On June 3, 2022, Roemer was shot and killed in his home by Douglas K. Uhde. Uhde had appeared in Roemer's court in 2005 and was convicted and sentenced to six years in prison for armed burglary with a dangerous weapon. After killing Roemer, Uhde shot himself, but was still alive when discovered by police. Uhde died at a nearby hospital four days later.

Uhde was described by police as a likely "grievance collector" and had a list of other targets which included Democratic Wisconsin governor Tony Evers, Democratic Michigan governor Gretchen Whitmer, and Republican U.S. Senate leader Mitch McConnell.

== Personal life and family ==
John Roemer married Vivian Mae Schroeder on November 20, 1980; Vivian died August 8, 2018. They had three sons. Roemer was active in the St. Paul's Evangelical Lutheran Church in Mauston, Wisconsin.

== Electoral history ==
=== Wisconsin Circuit Court (2004) ===
Wisconsin Circuit Court, Juneau Circuit Election, 2004
Party	Candidate	Votes	%	±%
General Election, April 6, 2004
Nonpartisan	John P. Roemer	3,326	61.93%	
Nonpartisan	Dennis Schuh (incumbent)	2,040	37.98%	
	Scattering	5	0.09%	
Plurality		1,286	23.94%	
Total votes		5,371	100.0%	

== See also ==
- List of homicides in Wisconsin

Legal offices
Preceded by Dennis Schuh	Wisconsin Circuit Court Judge for the Juneau circuit, branch 1 August 1, 2004 – August 2017	Succeeded by Stacy A. Smith
