= Wisconsin's 16th Assembly district =

American legislative district in Milwaukee, Wisconsin

Wisconsin's 16th State Assembly district
- 2024 map defined in 2023 Wisc. Act 94; 2022 map defined in Johnson v. Wisconsin Elections Commission; 2011 map was defined in 2011 Wisc. Act 43
Assemblymember
Kalan Haywood; D–Milwaukee
since January 7, 2019 (7 years)
- Demographics: 32.03% White; 54.13% Black; 7.08% Hispanic; 6.25% Asian; 1.66% Native American; 0.16% Hawaiian/Pacific Islander
- Population (2020) • Voting age: 59,714; 45,615
- Website: Official website
- Notes: Downtown Milwaukee

The 16th Assembly district of Wisconsin is one of 99 districts in the Wisconsin State Assembly. Located in southeast Wisconsin, the district is entirely contained within the boundaries of the city of Milwaukee in central Milwaukee County. It comprises much of downtown Milwaukee, including the campus of Marquette University, Milwaukee Rescue Mission, Fiserv Forum, the Milwaukee Public Museum, and the Marquette Interchange. The district is represented by Democrat Kalan Haywood, since January 2019.

The 16th Assembly district is located within Wisconsin's 6th Senate district, along with the 17th and 18th Assembly districts.

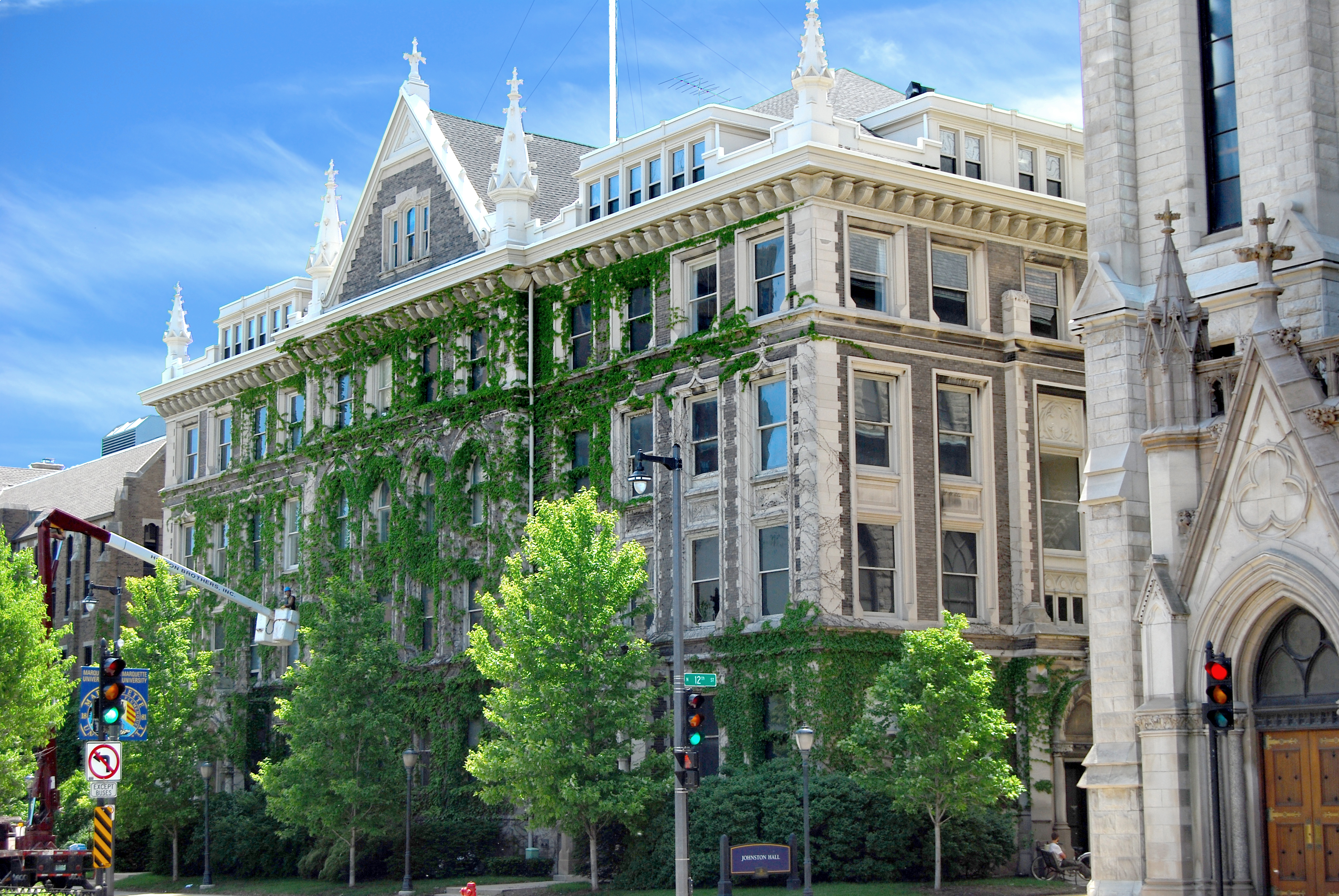
Johnson Hall, Marquette University

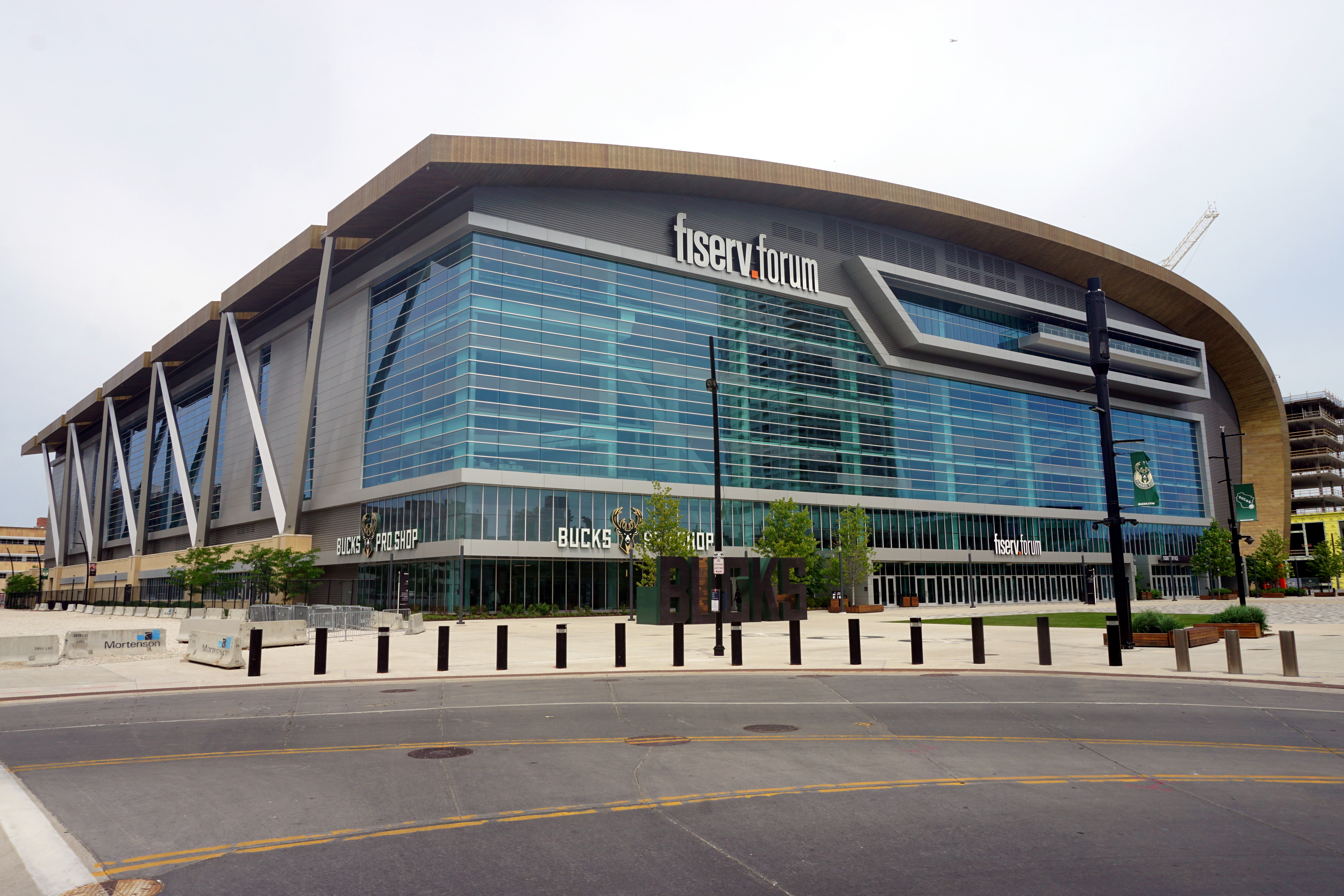
Fiserv Forum

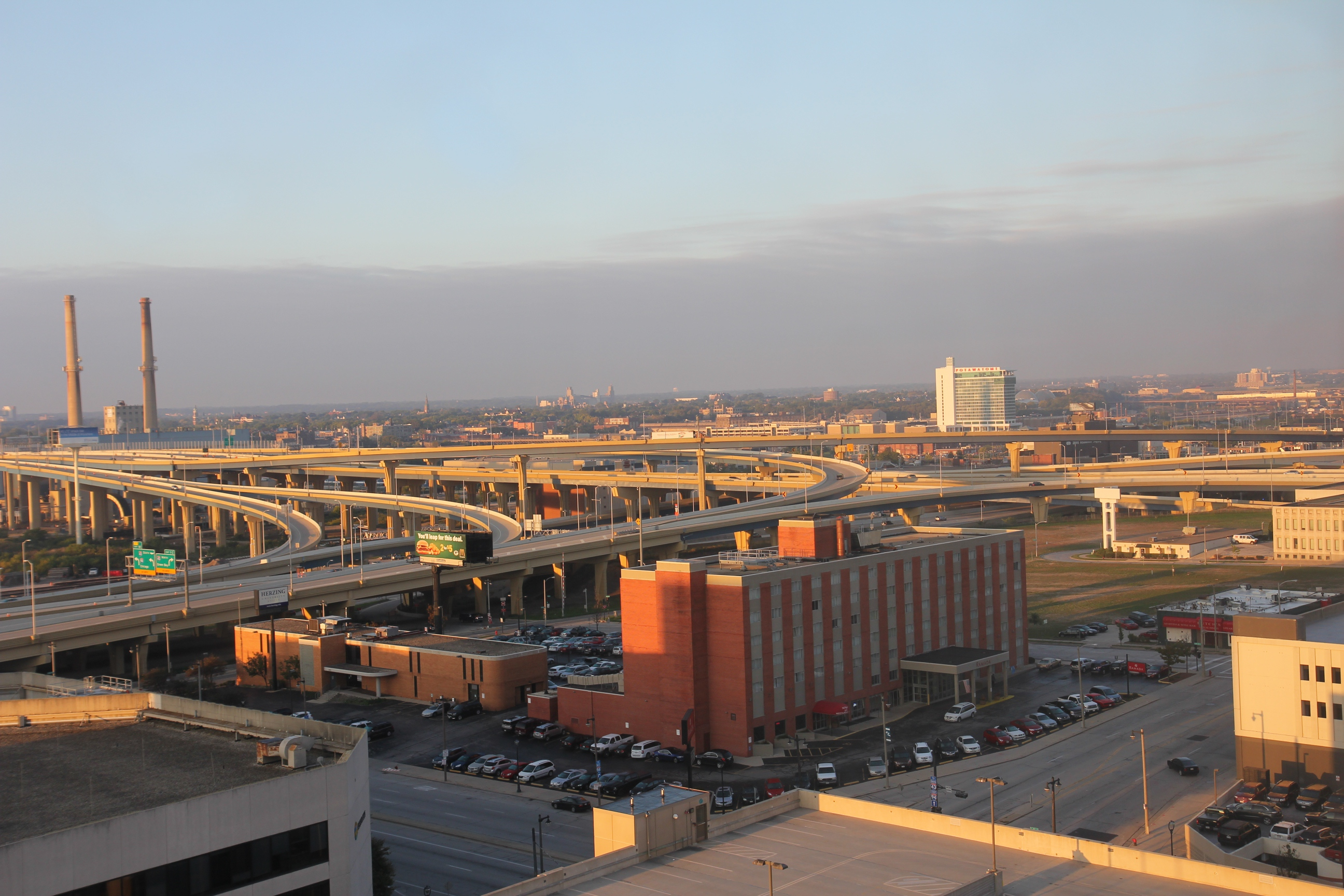
Marquette Interchange

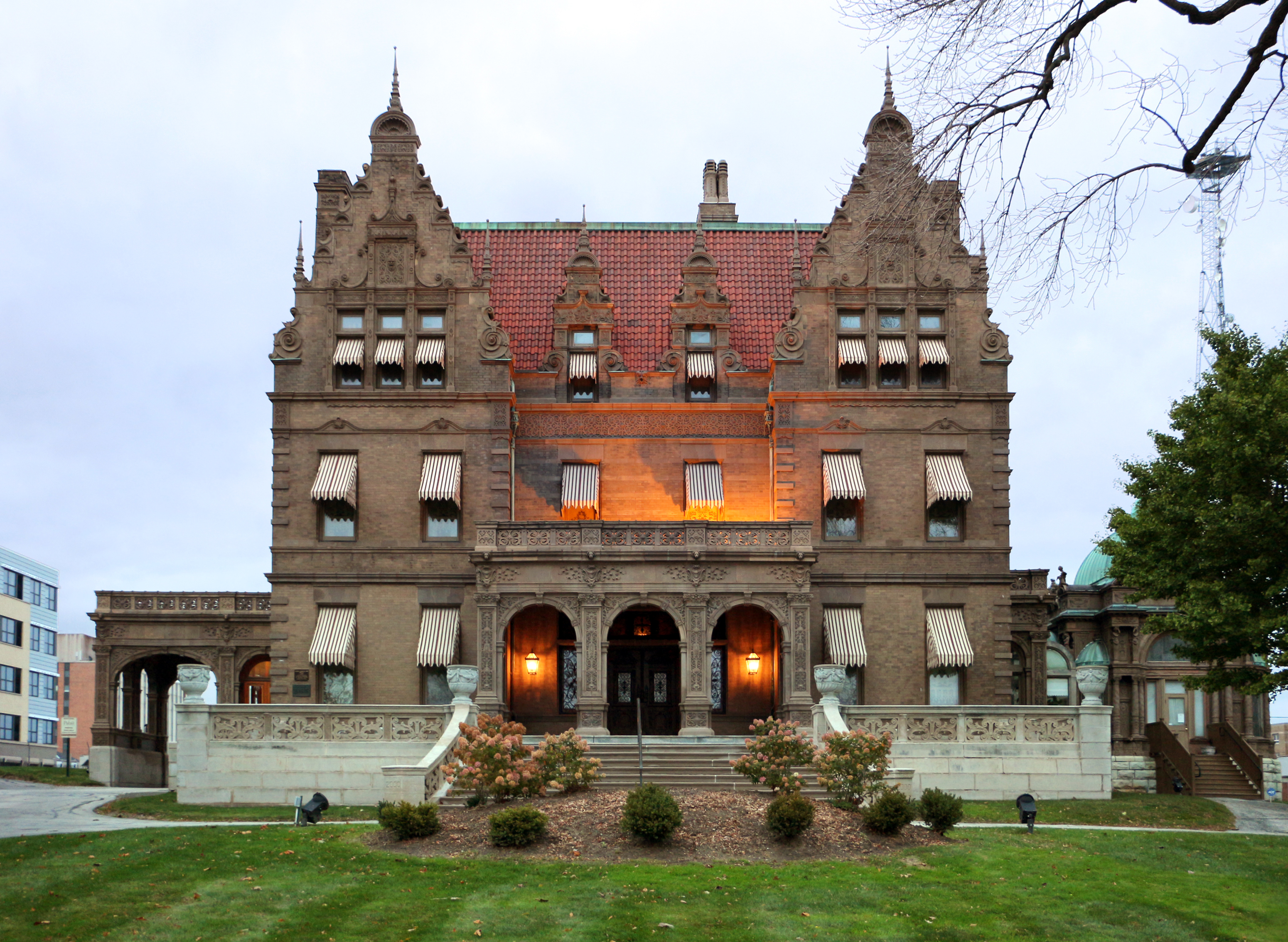
Pabst Mansion

== History ==
The district was created in the 1972 redistricting act (1971 Wisc. Act 304) which first established the numbered district system, replacing the previous system which allocated districts to specific counties. The 16th district was drawn somewhat in line with the previous Milwaukee County 2nd district, with some of the southwest wards exchanged for more in the southeast and northeast.

With the exception of the 1982 court-ordered redistricting plan, which moved the district to cover West Allis, in the western part of the county, the district has otherwise remained in north-central Milwaukee County within the boundaries of the city of Milwaukee. The current 16th Assembly district is only slightly south of the original boundaries of the district, and contains several of the same neighborhoods.

The 16th district has been represented by two of the youngest members of the Assembly in Wisconsin history, Michael Elconin, who entered office in 1973 at age 19, and current representative Kalan Haywood, who was also only 19 when sworn in in 2019.

== List of past representatives ==
List of representatives to the Wisconsin State Assembly from the 16th district
Member	Party	Residence	Counties represented	Term start	Term end	Ref.
District created
Michael Elconin	Dem.	Milwaukee	Milwaukee	January 1, 1973	November 14, 1977	
--Vacant--			Milwaukee	November 14, 1977	January 24, 1978	
William B. Broydrick	Dem.	Milwaukee	Milwaukee	January 24, 1978	November 1, 1981	
--Vacant--			Milwaukee	November 1, 1981	January 15, 1982	
Thomas W. Meaux	Dem.	Milwaukee	Milwaukee	January 15, 1982	January 3, 1983	
Jeannette Bell	Dem.	West Allis	Milwaukee	January 3, 1983	January 7, 1985	
G. Spencer Coggs	Dem.	Milwaukee	Milwaukee	January 7, 1985	January 4, 1993	
Leon Young	Dem.	Milwaukee	Milwaukee	January 4, 1993	January 7, 2019	
Kalan Haywood	Dem.	Milwaukee	Milwaukee	January 7, 2019	Current	
