= Wisconsin's 30th Assembly district =

American legislative district in western Wisconsin

Wisconsin's 30th State Assembly district
- 2024 map defined in 2023 Wisc. Act 94; 2022 map defined in Johnson v. Wisconsin Elections Commission; 2011 map was defined in 2011 Wisc. Act 43
Assemblymember
Shannon Zimmerman; R–River Falls
since January 3, 2017 (9 years)
- Demographics: 91.47% White; 1.58% Black; 2.69% Hispanic; 1.71% Asian; 1.74% Native American; 0.14% Hawaiian/Pacific Islander
- Population (2020) • Voting age: 59,314; 46,155
- Website: Official website
- Notes: Northwest Wisconsin

The 30th Assembly district of Wisconsin is one of 99 districts in the Wisconsin State Assembly. Located in western Wisconsin, the district comprises parts of southwest St. Croix County and northwest Pierce County. It includes the cities of Hudson and River Falls, as well as the village of North Hudson. It also contains the University of Wisconsin–River Falls campus, Willow River State Park, and Kinnickinnic State Park. The district is represented by Republican Shannon Zimmerman, since January 2017.

The 30th Assembly district is located within Wisconsin's 10th Senate district, along with the 28th and 29th Assembly districts.

The 30th Assembly district is contained within the Wisconsin portion of the Minneapolis-Saint Paul Metropolitan Area.

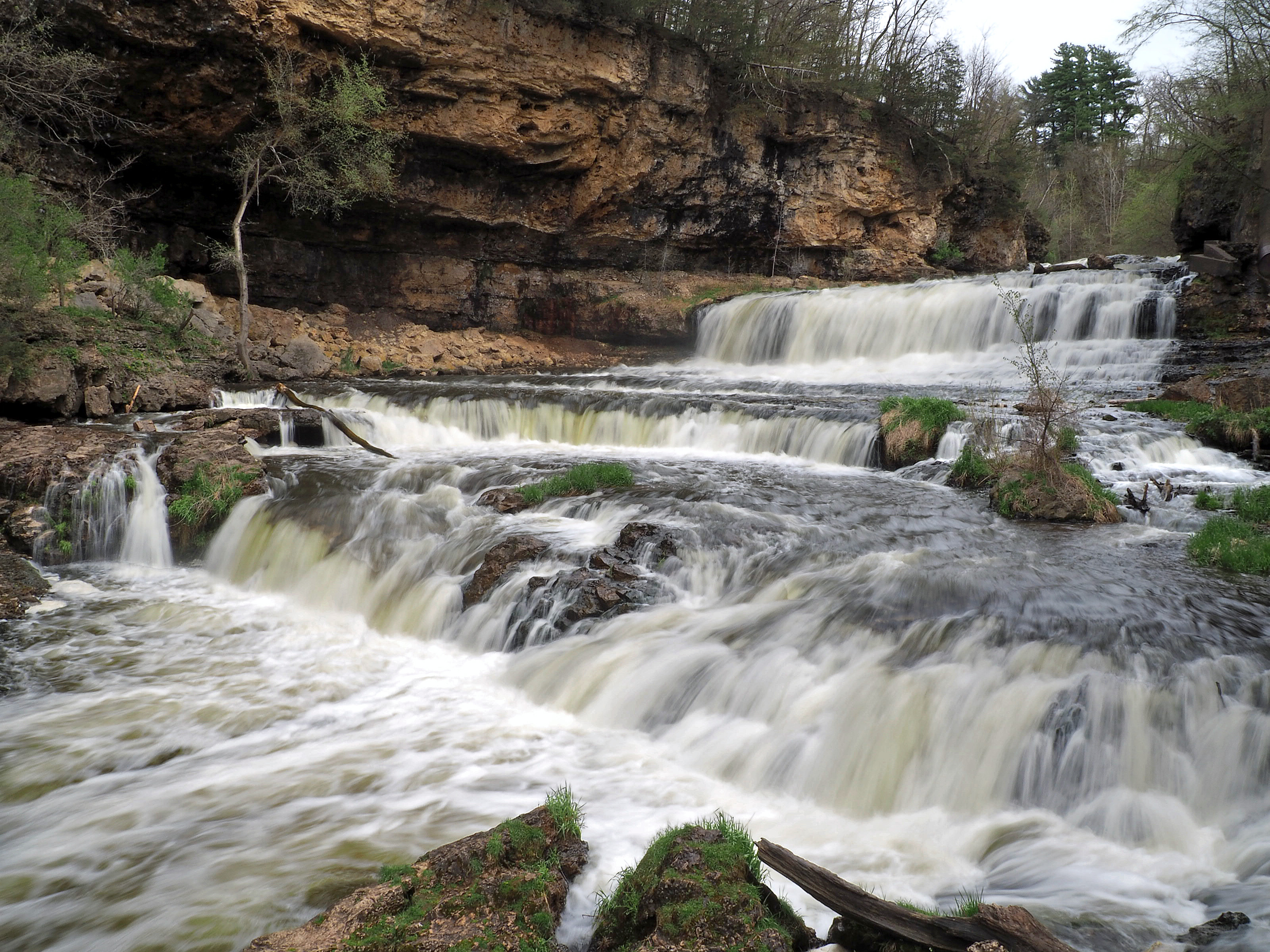
Willow Falls in Willow River State Park

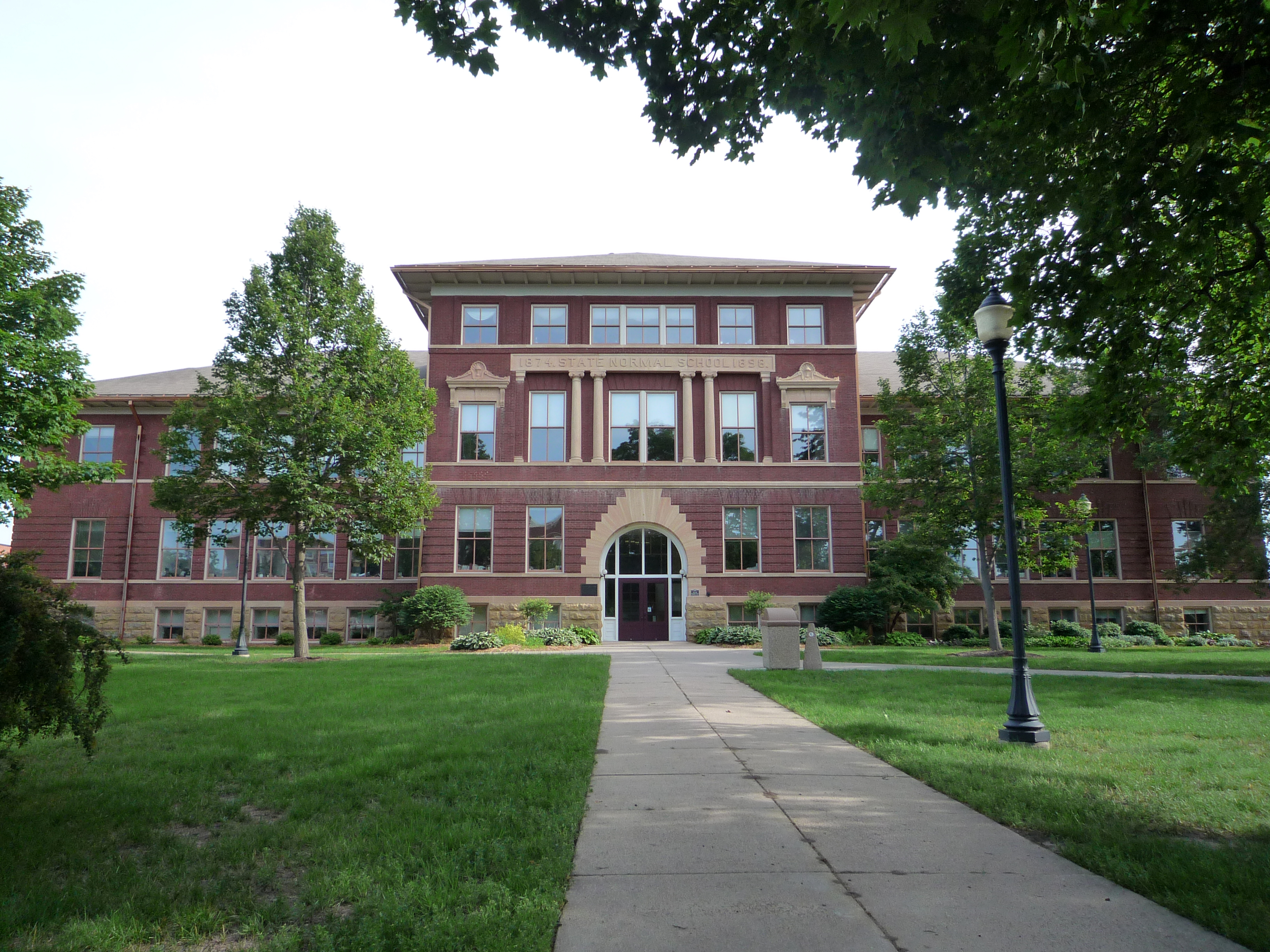
South Hall, on the University of Wisconsin–River Falls campus

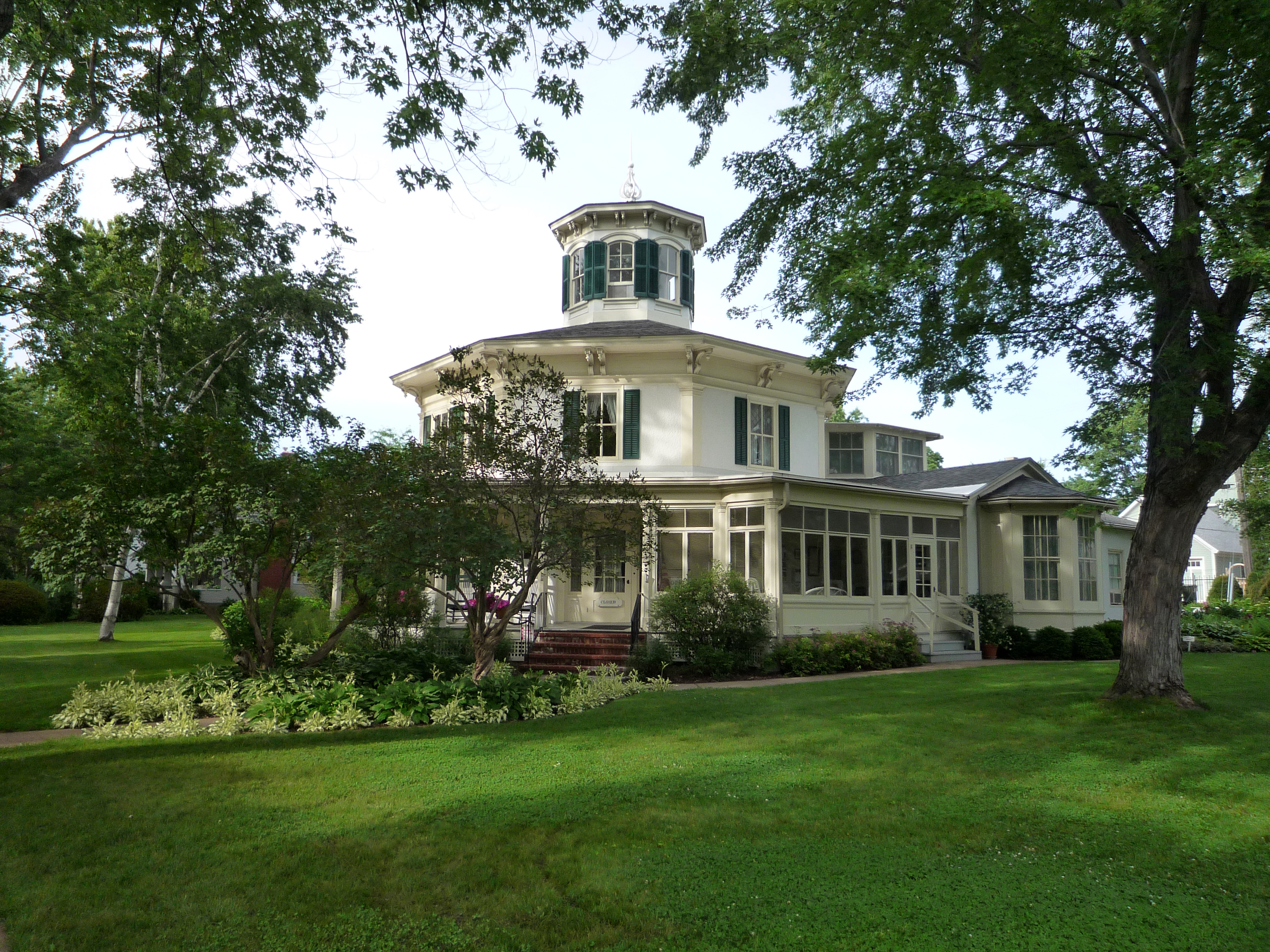
John S. Moffat House in Hudson

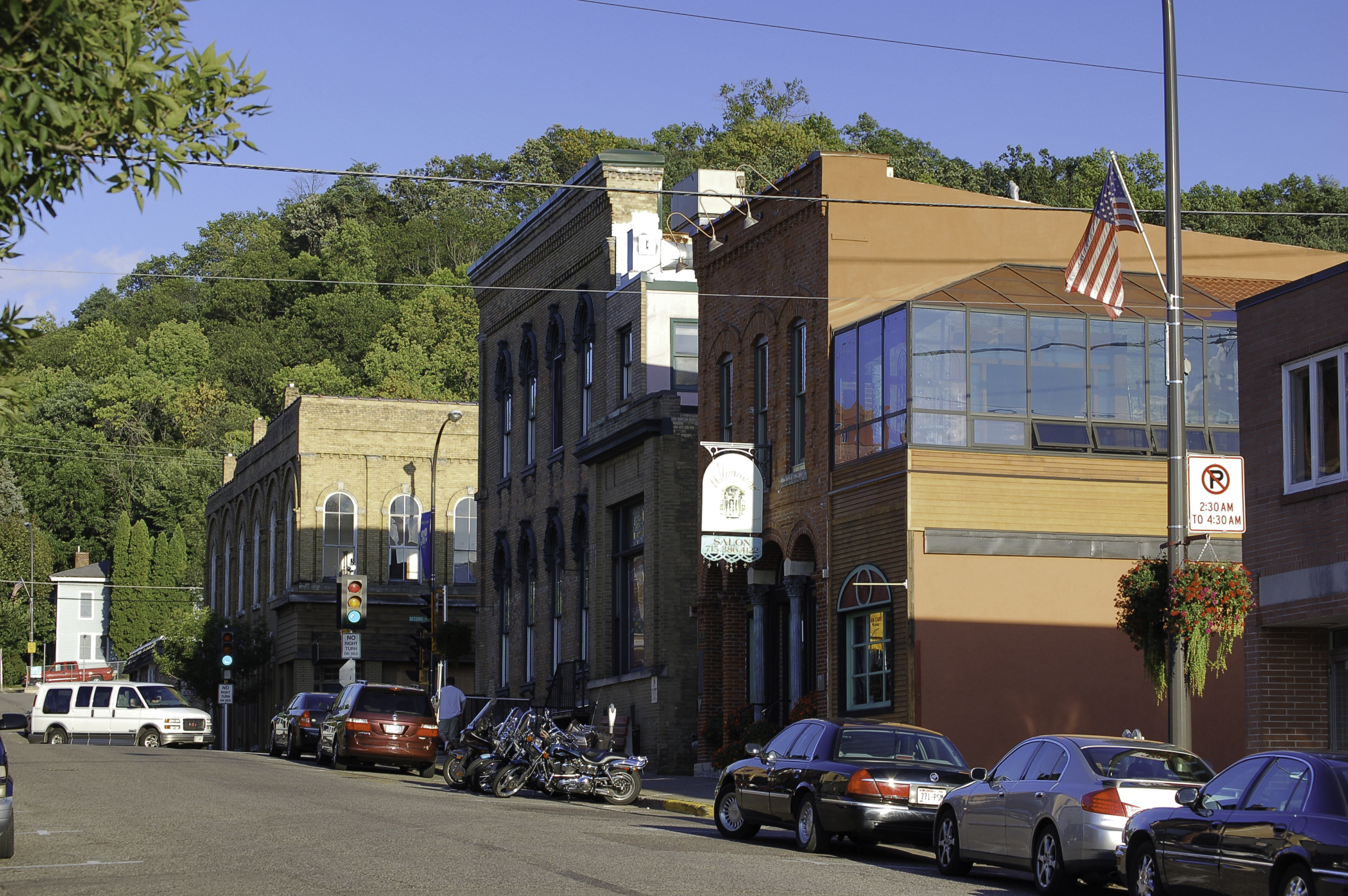
Downtown Hudson

== History ==
The district was created in the 1972 redistricting act (1971 Wisc. Act 304) which first established the numbered district system, replacing the previous system which allocated districts to specific counties. The 30th district was drawn mostly in line with the boundaries of the previous Buffalo County–Pepin County–Pierce County district, exchanging part of northeast Pierce County for part of western Trempealeau County. The last representative of the Buffalo–Pepin–Pierce district, Michael P. Early, was elected in 1972 as the first representative of the 30th Assembly district.

The 1982 court-ordered redistricting briefly moved the 30th district to eastern Waukesha County. The 1983 redistricting act moved it back to western Wisconsin, but in a much smaller geographic space than 1972, comprising just Pierce County and part of southwest St. Croix County, including the cities of Hudson and River Falls. As population grew in the two cities, the 1992 court-ordered plan removed more rural parts of northeast Pierce County and central St. Croix County, but maintained the core population of the district. The 2002 redistricting continued that trend, with the district comprising just the western third of Pierce County and a strip of southwest St. Croix County. The 2011 redistricting act (2011 Wisc. Act 43) also continued with Hudson and River Falls as the core of the district, but removed most of the rest of Pierce County and shifted the district north to contain more of St. Croix County. The 2022 court-ordered redistricting severed the Hudson and River Falls connection, removing nearly all of River Falls from the district and expanding it to include much more of rural St. Croix County.

The 2024 redistricting (2023 Wisc. Act 94) restored the old Hudson and River Falls core of the district, moving it back into northwest Pierce County and southwest St. Croix County. Under the new map configuration, the 30th Assembly district is projected to be one of the most competitive districts in the state legislature.

== List of past representatives ==
List of representatives to the Wisconsin State Assembly from the 30th district
Member	Party	Residence	Counties represented	Term start	Term end	Ref.
District created
Michael P. Early	Dem.	River Falls	Buffalo, Pepin, Pierce, Trempealeau	January 1, 1973	August 15, 1977	
--Vacant--			Buffalo, Pepin, Pierce, Trempealeau	August 15, 1977	November 7, 1977	
James Harsdorf	Rep.	River Falls	Buffalo, Pepin, Pierce, Trempealeau	November 7, 1977	January 5, 1981	
Jule Berndt	Rep.	River Falls	Buffalo, Pepin, Pierce, Trempealeau	January 5, 1981	January 3, 1983	
John C. Schober	Rep.	New Berlin	Waukesha	January 3, 1983	January 7, 1985	
William Berndt	Rep.	River Falls	Pierce, St. Croix	January 7, 1985	January 2, 1989	
Sheila Harsdorf	Rep.	River Falls	Pierce, St. Croix	January 2, 1989	January 4, 1999	
Kitty Rhoades	Rep.	Hudson	Pierce, St. Croix	January 4, 1999	January 3, 2011	
Dean Knudson	Rep.	Hudson	Pierce, St. Croix	January 3, 2011	January 3, 2017	
Shannon Zimmerman	Rep.	River Falls	Pierce, St. Croix	January 3, 2017	Current	
Kevin Knoke	Dem.	Hudson	Pierce, St. Croix	Taking office January 2027		

== Electoral history ==
Year	Date	Elected				Defeated				Total	Plurality	Other primary candidates
1972	Nov. 7	Michael P. Early	Democratic	10,443	57.88%	Robert M. Stoughton	Rep.	7,475	41.43%	18,043	2,968	
1972	Nov. 7	Michael P. Early	Democratic	10,443	57.88%	Donald Kohr	Amer.	125	0.69%	18,043	2,968	
1974	Nov. 5	Michael P. Early (inc)	Democratic	8,515	58.68%	William S. Hall	Rep.	5,829	40.17%	14,511	2,686	
1974	Nov. 5	Michael P. Early (inc)	Democratic	8,515	58.68%	Merlon Lingenfelter	Amer.	167	1.15%	14,511	2,686	
1976	Nov. 2	Michael P. Early (inc.)	Democratic	14,657	71.56%	Myrtle J. Wright	Rep.	5,824	28.44%	20,481	8,833	
1977	Oct. 25	James Harsdorf	Republican	3,920	51.07%	Rodney J. Nilsestuen	Dem.	3,755	48.93%	7,675	165	George C. Banta (Rep.); Robert I. Johnson (Rep.); Michael J. Manion (Rep.); Richard Truax (Rep.)
1978	Nov. 7	James Harsdorf (inc)	Republican	8,033	57.80%	William O. Early	Dem.	5,866	42.20%	13,899	2,167	
1980	Nov. 4	Jule Berndt	Republican	10,911	52.31%	Earl Gilson	Dem.	9,947	47.69%	20,858	964	Louellyn Nestingen (Dem.)
1982	Nov. 2	John C. Schober	Republican	10,078	67.60%	Victor S. Preuss	Dem.	4,830	32.40%	14,908	5,248	A. Vernon Jensen (Dem.)
1984	Nov. 6	William Berndt	Republican	11,512	51.25%	Earl Gilson	Dem.	10,949	48.75%	22,461	563	
1986	Nov. 4	William Berndt (inc)	Republican	7,091	53.52%	Margaret Baldwin	Dem.	6,159	46.48%	13,250	932	Earl Gilson (Dem.)
1988	Nov. 8	Sheila Harsdorf	Republican	13,480	56.04%	Brenda L. Kittilson	Dem.	10,575	43.96%	24,055	2,905	Earl Gilson (Dem.); Tobi R. Miller (Rep.)
1990	Nov. 6	Sheila Harsdorf (inc)	Republican	9,626	67.11%	David Balin	Dem.	4,717	32.89%	14,343	4,909	
1992	Nov. 3	Sheila Harsdorf (inc)	Republican	17,950	92.58%	M. Felderman-Baldwin	Ind.	1,438	7.42%	19,388	16,512	
1994	Nov. 8	Sheila Harsdorf (inc)	Republican	10,413	68.31%	Jill Ann Berke	Dem.	4,830	31.69%	15,243	5,583	
1996	Nov. 5	Sheila Harsdorf (inc)	Republican	13,604	57.98%	James R. Johnson	Dem.	9,861	42.02%	23,465	3,743	
1998	Nov. 3	Kitty Rhoades	Republican	9,755	57.29%	James R. Johnson	Dem.	7,272	42.71%	17,027	2,483	Jay Griggs (Rep.)
2000	Nov. 7	Kitty Rhoades (inc)	Republican	17,303	62.76%	Laurie J. Lundgaard	Dem.	10,247	37.17%	27,568	7,056	
2002	Nov. 5	Kitty Rhoades (inc)	Republican	12,563	69.01%	Bob Feickert	Dem.	5,635	30.95%	18,205	6,928	
2004	Nov. 2	Kitty Rhoades (inc)	Republican	20,540	61.09%	Tom Parent	Dem.	13,071	38.87%	33,624	7,469	
2006	Nov. 7	Kitty Rhoades (inc)	Republican	12,790	57.40%	Dan Gorman	Dem.	9,479	42.54%	22,282	3,311	
2008	Nov. 4	Kitty Rhoades (inc)	Republican	19,729	54.74%	Sarah A. Bruch	Dem.	16,278	45.17%	36,041	3,451	Bob Hughes (Rep.)
2010	Nov. 2	Dean Knudson	Republican	14,124	62.00%	Matt Borup	Dem.	8,629	37.88%	22,780	5,495	Ben Plunkett (Dem.)
2012	Nov. 6	Dean Knudson (inc)	Republican	17,261	55.79%	Diane Odeen	Dem.	13,657	44.14%	30,938	3,604	
2014	Nov. 4	Dean Knudson (inc)	Republican	13,951	59.70%	Darrel Laumann	Dem.	8,658	37.05%	23,368	5,293	
2014	Nov. 4	Dean Knudson (inc)	Republican	13,951	59.70%	Laurie Kroeger	Ind.	747	3.20%	23,368	5,293	
2016	Nov. 8	Shannon Zimmerman	Republican	17,790	56.05%	Scott J. Nelson	Dem.	12,358	38.94%	31,739	5,432	Paul W. Berning (Rep.)
2016	Nov. 8	Shannon Zimmerman	Republican	17,790	56.05%	Aaron S. Taylor	Ind.	1,574	4.96%	31,739	5,432	Paul W. Berning (Rep.)
2018	Nov. 6	Shannon Zimmerman (inc)	Republican	15,240	53.91%	Barry Hammarback	Dem.	13,015	46.04%	28,271	2,225	
2020	Nov. 3	Shannon Zimmerman (inc)	Republican	20,711	55.88%	Sarah Yacoub	Dem.	16,322	44.04%	37,062	4,389	
2022	Nov. 8	Shannon Zimmerman (inc)	Republican	17,719	58.48%	Sarah Yacoub	Dem.	12,557	41.44%	30,301	5,162	
