= John C. Schober =

American politician

Member of the Wisconsin State Assembly
- In office January 7, 1985 – January 2, 1989
- Preceded by: Sharon Metz
- Succeeded by: Marc C. Duff
- Constituency: 84th district
- In office January 3, 1983 – January 7, 1985
- Preceded by: Jule Berndt
- Succeeded by: William Berndt
- Constituency: 30th district
- In office April 14, 1982 – January 3, 1983
- Preceded by: John C. Shabaz
- Succeeded by: William J. Rogers
- Constituency: 83rd district

Personal details
- Born: June 25, 1951 (age 75) Waukesha, Wisconsin, U.S.
- Education: Marquette University; Marquette University Law School
- Profession: lawyer, politician

John C. Schober (born June 25, 1951) is an American lawyer and politician.

Born in Waukesha, Wisconsin, Schober graduated from New Berlin High School in New Berlin, Wisconsin. He received his bachelor's degree from Marquette University and his J.D. degree from Marquette University Law School. Schober practiced law in New Berlin and village attorney for Big Bend, Wisconsin. Schober served on the New Berlin Common Council (city council), and was president of the council. In the April 1982 special election, Schober was elected to the Wisconsin State Assembly as a Republican and then served until 1989.
