= Shannon Zimmerman =

21st century American politician (born 1972)

Member of the Wisconsin State Assembly from the 30th district
- Incumbent
- Assumed office January 3, 2017
- Preceded by: Dean Knudson

Personal details
- Born: March 15, 1972 (age 54) Madison, Wisconsin, U.S.
- Party: Republican
- Spouse: Angel
- Children: 2
- Education: Chippewa Valley Technical College; University of Wisconsin–Milwaukee
- Occupation: businessman, politician
- Website: Official website Campaign website

Shannon M. Zimmerman (born March 15, 1972) is an American Republican politician and businessman from River Falls, Wisconsin. He is a member of the Wisconsin State Assembly, representing Wisconsin's 30th Assembly district since 2017.

== Early life and education ==
Shannon Zimmerman was born in Madison, Wisconsin in March 1972. For much of his youth Zimmerman was raised in rural northwest Wisconsin, attending public school in Augusta, Wisconsin, in the Augusta Area School District and graduating from Augusta High School in 1990. Zimmerman was a member of the WI State Football Team Champions in Division 6, November 1989. After this he went on to attend Chippewa Valley Technical College and later transferred to the University of Wisconsin–Milwaukee.

== Business career ==
In 1996, after attending the University of Wisconsin–Milwaukee, Zimmerman founded Sajan Inc., a local language translation company, and served as its CEO.

Due to the 2008 financial crisis, MathStar, a Minnesota-based semi-conductor manufacturer, had gone into sharp decline, being delisted from the Nasdaq in early 2008. After negotiating with various companies, MathStar entered negotiations with Zimmerman's company regarding a reverse merger. Eventually the two companies merged in 2010, with Zimmerman remaining as CEO of the company.

Zimmerman leads Sajan to INC 500 status. Sajan, Inc was recognized for reaching the elite INC 500. Business growth and success paved the way to this achievement. https://www.wisbusiness.com/2008/inc-magazine-reveals-its-27th-annual-list-of-americas-500-fastest-growing-private-companies/

In 2012, Zimmerman and his family founded Belle Vinez Vineyard and Winery, expanding it to include a retail section in 2015. They eventually sold the winery in 2022.

== Political career ==
=== State Assembly ===
After representing the district since 2011, representative Dean Knudson decided not to seek re-election, leaving the district open. In the race, Zimmerman ran for the nomination against local Hudson-based insurance agent Paul Berning. In the general election, Zimmerman defeated Democrat Scott Nelson and Independent Aaron Taylor.

After his election, Zimmerman drew criticism after comments he made in a 2013 UWRF School of Business & Economics lecture resurfaced where he was asked what language was the most challenging to translate, with Zimmerman responding "it's woman, right? (Citing the book 'Men are from Mars, Women from Venus') Sometimes she says this, but she means this." With Zimmerman playing his remarks off as a joke.

During Zimmerman's 2020 re-election campaign complaints were submitted to the Wisconsin Elections Commission alleging he did not reside in the district he represented, and had falsely claimed his residency. These complaints drew on the fact Zimmerman had two residencies, one in Clifton, Wisconsin, that he maintained for tax purposes, and a residency in River Falls, Wisconsin, that he maintained for voting purposes, with the complaint alleging he did not live in the latter property. Eventually, the complaint was rejected by the WEC after a 4-2 vote, saying there was "no reasonable suspicion" that Zimmerman had violated the law.

In 2024 Wisconsin saw a significant redrawing of the state legislative maps which undid the Republican gerrymander that had been created back in 2011. Zimmerman's district was redrawn to be similar to the borders prior to the 2021 redistricting, centering around the cities of Hudson and River Falls, as opposed to moving the two cities into in their own districts. Under the new lines, the 30th Assembly district was projected to be one of the most competitive districts in the state assembly.

Zimmerman defeated Democrat Alison Page, a former healthcare executive, in the general election by an 8-point margin.

=== State Senate special election ===
In 2018, after accepting a position within the Scott Walker administration, Sheila Harsdorf resigned her seat in the Wisconsin Senate to become Wisconsin's Secretary of Agriculture. With this open district, Zimmerman announced his candidacy for the special election for the district. During the campaign he largely self-funded, outspending his opponent Adam Jarchow two-to-one. Additionally, Zimmerman differentiated himself from Jarchow due to his support for the Foxconn deal, claiming during the campaign that Jarchow had opposed the deal and stood in opposition to then governor Scott Walker.

In the primary, Zimmerman was defeated by Jarchow by a 12 point margin.

== Personal life ==
Zimmerman and his wife are both members of the Baptist Eagle Brook Church. Angel Zimmerman was a co-founder of Sajan and served as Chief Operating Officer (COO) until 2015.

== Electoral history ==
=== State Assembly (2016–present) ===
| Year | Election | Date | Elected | | | | Defeated | | | | Total | Plurality |
|---|---|---|---|---|---|---|---|---|---|---|---|---|
| 2016 | Primary | Aug. 9 | Shannon Zimmerman | Republican | 1,565 | 57.77% | Paul Berning | Rep. | 1,138 | 42.01% | 2,709 | 427 |
| 2016 | General | Nov. 8 | Shannon Zimmerman | Republican | 17,790 | 56.05% | Scott J. Nelson | Dem. | 12,358 | 38.94% | 31,739 | 5,432 |
| 2016 | General | Nov. 8 | Shannon Zimmerman | Republican | 17,790 | 56.05% | Aaron S. Taylor | Ind. | 1,574 | 4.96% | 31,739 | 5,432 |
| 2018 | General | Nov. 6 | Shannon Zimmerman (inc) | Republican | 15,240 | 53.91% | Barry Hammarback | Dem. | 13,015 | 46.04% | 28,271 | 2,225 |
| 2020 | General | Nov. 3 | Shannon Zimmerman (inc) | Republican | 20,711 | 55.88% | Sarah Yacoub | Dem. | 16,322 | 44.04% | 37,062 | 4,389 |
| 2022 | General | Nov. 8 | Shannon Zimmerman (inc) | Republican | 17,719 | 58.48% | Sarah Yacoub | Dem. | 12,557 | 41.44% | 30,301 | 5,162 |
| 2024 | General | Nov. 5 | Shannon Zimmerman (inc) | Republican | 20,309 | 54.21% | Alison Page | Dem. | 17,117 | 45.69% | 37,464 | 3,192 |

=== State Senate (2017) ===
| Year | Election | Date | Elected | | | | Defeated | | | | Total | Plurality |
|---|---|---|---|---|---|---|---|---|---|---|---|---|
| 2018 (special) | Primary | Dec. 19 (2017) | Adam Jarchow | Republican | 4,023 | 55.94% | Shannon Zimmerman | Rep. | 3,161 | 43.95% | 7,192 | 862 |

Wisconsin State Assembly
| Preceded by Dean Knudson | Member of the Wisconsin State Assembly from the 30th district January 3, 2017 – present | Incumbent |
