= Senator Harsdorf =

Senator Harsdorf may refer to:

- James Harsdorf (born 1950), Wisconsin State Senate
- Sheila Harsdorf (born 1956), Wisconsin State Senate
