= Joseph E. Tregoning =

20th century American politician

Acting Secretary of the Wisconsin Department of Agriculture, Trade and Consumer Protection
- In office August 1, 1997 – November 2, 1997
- Governor: Tommy Thompson
- Preceded by: Alan Tracy
- Succeeded by: Ben Brancel

Member of the Wisconsin State Assembly
- In office January 7, 1985 – May 28, 1990
- Preceded by: Patricia Spafford Smith
- Succeeded by: Stephen Freese
- Constituency: 51st Assembly district
- In office January 3, 1983 – January 7, 1985
- Preceded by: Harland E. Everson
- Succeeded by: Margaret S. Lewis
- Constituency: 38th Assembly district
- In office January 1, 1973 – January 3, 1983
- Preceded by: District created
- Succeeded by: Patricia Spafford Smith
- Constituency: 51st Assembly district
- In office April 10, 1967 – January 1, 1973
- Preceded by: G. Fred Galli
- Succeeded by: District abolished
- Constituency: Green–Lafayette district

Personal details
- Born: April 26, 1941 Dubuque, Iowa, U.S.
- Died: October 10, 2019 (aged 78) Madison, Wisconsin, U.S.
- Resting place: Evergreen Cemetery, Shullsburg, Wisconsin
- Party: Republican
- Spouse: Jeanne M. Brunette (m. 1971; died 2016)
- Children: Joshua Tregoning
- Occupation: Farmer

Joseph E. Tregoning (May 26, 1941 – October 10, 2019) was an American dairy farmer, businessman, and Republican politician from Shullsburg, Wisconsin. He served 23 years in the Wisconsin State Assembly, from 1967 to 1990. He subsequently served as deputy secretary of the Wisconsin Department of Agriculture, Trade and Consumer Protection under governor Tommy Thompson, and was acting secretary in late 1997.

== Biography ==
Joseph Tregoning was born on May 26, 1941, in Dubuque, Iowa. He was raised and educated in Shullsburg, Wisconsin, where his father owned a farm. He graduated from Shullsburg High School.

== Political career ==
Joe became active locally in the Republican Party of Wisconsin, and from 1964 to 1967 he served as chairman of the Lafayette County Republican Party.

In 1966, Tregoning made his first bid for Wisconsin State Assembly, launching a primary challenge against incumbent state representative G. Fred Galli in the Green–Lafayette district. Galli was just completing his first term in the Assembly, and was facing a challenge from both Tregoning, who was then-chair of the Lafayette County Republican Party, and from Madeline Stauffacher, who was then-chair of the Green County Republican Party. In the three-way primary, Galli prevailed, receiving 52% to Tregoning's 26% of the vote.

However, just after the start of 1967 legislative term, Galli died of a sudden heart attack. Tregoning decided to run again in the special election to succeed him and serve out the remainder of his term in the 78th Wisconsin Legislature. Tregoning again faced two opponents in the Republican primary, and prevailed narrowly over Monroe businessman Robert E. Tschudy. He easily prevailed in the April special election, defeating Democratic dairy farmer Thomas W. McCarthy. He easily won election to a full term in 1968, and was re-election in 1970 in the then-heavily Republican district.

The 1971 legislative term saw the passage of a major redistricting law. Districts were given a formal numbering, and Tregoning's district was made the 51st Assembly district. The boundaries of the district only slightly changed, removing some areas of northeastern Lafayette and northwestern Green counties and adding some territory of western Rock County. The district remained significantly Republican, and Tregoning easily won re-election in 1972 and 1974.

Just after the 1974 election, Tregoning suffered a severe injury while working on his farm. A piece of his clothing became stuck in a powered post hole digger. His left arm was severed, his right arm, left shoulder, left leg, and several ribs were broken, and he received a concussion. After a long hospitalization and moths of recovery, he returned to the State Capitol for the first time in April 1975.

After his accident, Tregoning won three more terms in that Assembly district. In 1982, the Wisconsin legislature underwent another drastic redistricting by court-order. This time, Tregoning's district was significantly effected. The court plan placed his native Lafayette County in the 38th Assembly district; Green and Rock counties were removed entirely, replaced by Iowa County and parts of southern Sauk County. The 1982 election was the closest of Tregoning's career, as he received only 52% of the vote. It was his only election in the 38th Assembly district, as a 1983 act of the legislature superseded the court-ordered district plan. The 1983 act restored his previous district number—51—but made only slight changes to the district boundaries from the 1982 plan, removing the areas of Sauk County and adding areas of southeast Grant County.

Tregoning went on to win the 1984 election under the new 51st Assembly district. In 1986, he faced his first primary challenge since winning office in 1967. His challenger was 26 year old Hazel Green farmer Stephen Freese, who charged that Tregoning, after 19 years in office, had lost touch with his district. Freese ran hard, knocking on 10,000 doors in the district, but fell 326 votes short in the primary. Tregoning went on to win the 1986 general election and one more term in 1988. Freese would ultimately succeed Tregoning.

== Department of Agriculture ==
In 1990, Wisconsin agriculture secretary Howard C. Richards announced his plan to retire and Tregoning decided to seek the office. At that time, the secretary was selected by a board of commissioners, not directly appointed by the governor. Tregoning was one of three finalists, along with former Republican legislator James Harsdorf and Alan Tracy, a close aide of the outgoing secretary. The board ultimately selected Alan Tracy as the next secretary, but immediately after his appointment, Tracy hired Tregoning as his executive assistant.

Tracy and Tregoning served together for over 7 years, and during that time the governor was given authority to directly appoint the secretary. When that change occurred, in 1995, then-governor Tommy Thompson considered replacing Tracy with a political appointee, but deferred. In 1996 and 1997, Tracy and his then-deputy, Elizabeth Kohl, were accused of mismanagement and harassment. The accusations culminated in both of their resignations in June of that year. Tregoning took over as acting secretary of the Wisconsin Department of Agriculture, Trade and Consumer Protection, and served in that capacity until Governor Thompson appointed a successor in November. The new secretary, Ben Brancel, chose to keep Tregoning on as deputy secretary.

Tregoning lost his title in 2001, when Tommy Thompson was replaced as governor by Scott McCallum. McCallum appointed his own secretary and deputy secretary, but allowed Tregoning to remain on as an employee of the department. Nevertheless, Tregoning's ouster was met with bipartisan disappointment in the state capitol. Tregoning accepted the demotion to assistant to new secretary James Harsdorf and was later assigned administrator of the division of agricultural development. He remained in that role until his retirement in 2003.

== Personal life and family ==
Joe Tregoning married Jeanne M. Brunette in 1971. They met when Jeanne was assigned as to his legislative office as a secretary during his first legislative term. Jeanne was a Democrat and the granddaughter of state legislator E. F. Brunette. After working in Joe's office during the 1967 session, Jeanne was hired as a staffer on the Kellett Commission on reorganization of state government.

Jeanne and Joe Tregoning had one son together before Jeanne was paralyzed in an automobile accident in 1972. Joe spent the next 44 years as her primary caregiver, even after his own serious accident in 1974.

Outside of politics, Tregoning was active in the Full Gospel Business Men's Fellowship International and Freemasonry. After leaving the Department of Agriculture, Tregoning largely stayed out of public affairs, but did weigh in occasionally to support candidates, including his friend former governor Tommy Thompson in his 2012 U.S. Senate campaign.

Jeanne M. Tregoning died at age 75 in Madison, Wisconsin on August 9, 2016; Joe died on October 10, 2019. He was survived by his son and three grandchildren.

== Electoral history ==
=== Wisconsin Assembly, Green–Lafayette district (1966–1970) ===
Year	Election	Date	Elected				Defeated				Total	Plurality
1966	Primary	Sep. 13	G. Fred Galli (inc)	Republican	4,145	52.52%	Joseph E. Tregoning	Rep.	2,073	26.27%	7,892	2,072
1966	Primary	Sep. 13	G. Fred Galli (inc)	Republican	4,145	52.52%	Madeline Stauffacher	Rep.	1,674	21.21%	7,892	2,072
1967 Special	Special; Primary	Mar. 7	Joseph E. Tregoning	Republican	2,082	45.38%	Robert E. Tschudy	Rep.	1,823	39.73%	4,588	259
1967 Special	Special; Primary	Mar. 7	Joseph E. Tregoning	Republican	2,082	45.38%	Madeline Stauffacher	Rep.	683	14.89%	4,588	259
1967 Special	Special	Apr. 4	Joseph E. Tregoning	Republican	6,848	77.45%	Thomas W. McCarthy	Dem.	1,994	22.55%	8,842	4,854
1968	General	Nov. 5	Joseph E. Tregoning (inc)	Republican	12,025	69.89%	Cecil McWilliams	Dem.	5,180	30.11%	17,205	6,845
1970	General	Nov. 3	Joseph E. Tregoning (inc)	Republican	8,875	67.52%	Kenneth E. Nyland	Dem.	4,270	32.48%	13,145	4,605

=== Wisconsin Assembly, 51st district (1972–1980) ===
Year	Election	Date	Elected				Defeated				Total	Plurality
1972	General	Nov. 7	Joseph E. Tregoning	Republican	12,507	70.75%	Theodore C. Weiss	Dem.	5,171	29.25%	17,678	7,336
1974	General	Nov. 5	Joseph E. Tregoning (inc)	Republican	8,595	64.17%	Donald M. Stauffacher	Dem.	4,800	35.83%	13,395	3,795
1976	General	Nov. 2	Joseph E. Tregoning (inc)	Republican	13,961	68.96%	Barbara A. Bogden	Dem.	6,284	31.04%	20,245	7,677
1976	General	Nov. 7	Joseph E. Tregoning (inc)	Republican	11,294	100.0%					11,294	11,294
1980	General	Nov. 4	Joseph E. Tregoning (inc)	Republican	14,833	68.78%	Terry McDonald	Dem.	6,733	31.22%	21,566	8,100

=== Wisconsin Assembly, 38th district (1982) ===
Year	Election	Date	Elected				Defeated				Total	Plurality
1982	General	Nov. 2	Joseph E. Tregoning	Republican	8,348	52.12%	Terry McDonald	Dem.	7,524	46.98%	21,566	8,100
1982	General	Nov. 2	Joseph E. Tregoning	Republican	8,348	52.12%	James Garrett Coffer	Lib.	145	0.91%	21,566	8,100

=== Wisconsin Assembly, 51st district (1984–1988) ===
Year	Election	Date	Elected				Defeated				Total	Plurality
1984	General	Nov. 6	Joseph E. Tregoning	Republican	11,799	61.49%	Peter G. Lewis	Dem.	7,389	38.51%	19,188	4,410
1986	Primary	Sep. 9	Joseph E. Tregoning (inc)	Republican	2,751	53.49%	Stephen Freese	Rep.	2,392	46.51%	5,143	359
1986	General	Nov. 4	Joseph E. Tregoning (inc)	Republican	7,458	55.95%	Peter G. Lewis	Dem.	5,872	44.05%	13,330	1,586
1988	General	Nov. 8	Joseph E. Tregoning (inc)	Republican	10,384	54.39%	Peter G. Lewis	Dem.	8,707	45.61%	19,091	1,677

Wisconsin State Assembly
Preceded by G. Fred Galli	Member of the Wisconsin State Assembly from the Green–Lafayette district April 10, 1967 – January 1, 1973	District abolished
District established by 1971 Wis. Act 304	Member of the Wisconsin State Assembly from the 51st district January 1, 1973 – January 3, 1983	Succeeded by Patricia Spafford Smith
Preceded by Harland E. Everson	Member of the Wisconsin State Assembly from the 38th district January 3, 1983 – January 7, 1985	Succeeded by Margaret S. Lewis
Preceded by Patricia Spafford Smith	Member of the Wisconsin State Assembly from the 51st district January 7, 1985 – May 28, 1990	Succeeded by Stephen Freese
Government offices
Preceded by Alan Tracy	Acting Secretary of the Wisconsin Department of Agriculture, Trade and Consumer Protection; August 1, 1997 – November 2, 1997	Succeeded by Ben Brancel
