= Buchli =

Buchli is a surname. Notable people with the surname include:

- Jakob Buchli (1876–1945), Swiss engineer
  - Buchli drive, locomotive transmission system invented by Jakob Buchli
- James Buchli (born 1945), American engineer and aviator
- Milton S. Buchli (1910–2003), American politician
