= Wisconsin's Buffalo–Pepin–Pierce Assembly district =

Wisconsin's Buffalo–Pepin–Pierce State Assembly district
- Obsolete
- Notes: 1954–1970

The Buffalo–Pepin–Pierce district of Wisconsin was a district in the Wisconsin State Assembly. Located in Western Wisconsin, the district consisted of Buffalo, Pepin, and Pierce counties. The district was first created via the 1951 redistricting plan, which combined the Pierce County district with the Buffalo–Pepin district. The new district was first represented by Republican representative Mamre H. Ward from 1955 to 1959. The district was last represented by Democrat Michael P. Early from 1971 to 1973, when the district was dissolved and replaced with the numbered district system by the 1972 redistricting act.

== List of representatives ==
Member	Party	Residence	Term start	Term end	Leg.
District created
Mamre H. Ward	Rep.	Durand	January 3, 1955	January 5, 1959	72nd 73rd
Edwin Rohl	Dem.	Prescott	January 5, 1959	January 2, 1961	74th
Robert I. Johnson	Rep.	Mondovi	January 2, 1961	January 4, 1965	75th 76th
Milton S. Buchli	Dem.	Montana	January 4, 1965	January 2, 1967	77th
Stanley York	Rep.	River Falls	January 2, 1967	January 6, 1969	78th
Stanley York	Rep.	River Falls	January 6, 1969	February 1, 1970	79th
--Vacant--			February 1, 1970	January 4, 1971	79th
Michael P. Early	Dem.	River Falls	January 4, 1971	January 1, 1973	80th
District abolished by 1971 Wisconsin Act 304; The Buffalo–Pepin–Pierce district was roughly replaced by the 30th Assembly district
