= Alice Clausing =

American politician

Member of the Wisconsin Senate from the 10th district
- In office January 4, 1993 – January 1, 2001
- Preceded by: William Berndt
- Succeeded by: Sheila Harsdorf

Personal details
- Born: June 7, 1944 (age 82) Port Washington, Wisconsin, U.S.
- Party: Democratic
- Spouse: Howard
- Children: 2
- Education: University of Wisconsin-Oshkosh, University of Wisconsin-Stout
- Occupation: Educator, politician

Alice Clausing (born June 7, 1944) is an American Democratic politician and educator from Port Washington, Wisconsin. She was a member of the Wisconsin State Senate, representing Wisconsin's 10th Senate district from 1993 until 2001.

== Early life and career ==
Clausing was born on June 7, 1944, in Port Washington, Wisconsin. She graduated from Port Washington High School in 1962. She is a graduate of the University of Wisconsin–Oshkosh and the University of Wisconsin–Stout. She was an educator and landlord of rental properties. She married Howard F. Clausing, also from Port Washington, in 1966 and their two children were born in the city as well.

In 1989 Clausing had been teaching her children how to swim at the local lake when she noticed the abnormal level of algae in the water, caused by phosphorus pollution. As a response, she began engaging in activism to clean up the lake, gathering 3,500 signatures to petition the Wisconsin Department of Natural Resources to reform various regulations surrounding pollution. When the legislation to reform the rules was put to a vote, William "Bill" Berndt voted against the amendment, killing the bill. In response to the end of that piece of legislation, Clausing announced her campaign to unseat Berndt and did so in the 1992 Senate elections. After her election, the rule change was successfully passed

== State Senate ==
Clausing was first elected to the Senate in 1992. She would serve as a member from 1993 until 2001, after she was defeated for re-election in 2000 by Sheila Harsdorf.

At the time of her election, Clausing had been the third Democrat to represent the district in the 20th century.

Running for re-election in 2000, Clausing faced a difficult race. Millions of dollars were being spent by outside groups in races like hers, as control of the state senate would play a role in which party would direct the redistricting process in Wisconsin for the next decade. According to Mike McCabe, director of the Wisconsin Democracy Campaign, Clausing's race had become the "worst example of runaway spending in the 2000 election..." Despite the high spending in support of her candidacy, and her own fundraising advantage over her Republican opponent, Clausing went down in defeat in the general election to former state representative Sheila Harsdorf with 47% of the vote.

Following her defeat, Clausing was selected by the Democratic Party to be an elector for the Al Gore-Joe Lieberman ticket in the 2000 United States presidential election.

In 2004, Clausing entered the Democratic primary to face Harsdorf but was defeated by Gary L. Bakke, who went on to be defeated by Harsdorf in the general election.
