= Dean Knudson =

American Republican politician

Dean R. Knudson

Chairman of the Wisconsin Elections Commission
- In office June 11, 2018 – June 3, 2020
- Preceded by: Mark L. Thomsen
- Succeeded by: Ann S. Jacobs

Member of the Wisconsin Elections Commission
- In office September 25, 2017 – June 8, 2022
- Appointed by: Robin Vos
- Preceded by: Steve King
- Succeeded by: Don M. Millis

Member of the Wisconsin State Assembly from the 30th district
- In office January 3, 2011 – January 3, 2017
- Preceded by: Kitty Rhoades
- Succeeded by: Shannon Zimmerman

52nd Mayor of Hudson, Wisconsin
- In office April 15, 2008 – November 5, 2010
- Preceded by: Jack Breault
- Succeeded by: Alan Burchill

Member of the City Council of Hudson, Wisconsin
- In office April 1996 – April 2002

Personal details
- Born: April 29, 1961 (age 65) Mayville, North Dakota, U.S.
- Party: Republican
- Spouse: Joy Schlichting Knudson (m. 1987)
- Children: Sonya, Reed
- Education: North Dakota State University; Iowa State University College of Veterinary Medicine
- Profession: Veterinarian, politician, businessman

Dean R. Knudson (born April 29, 1961) is an American veterinarian and Republican politician. He was one of the architects of the Wisconsin Elections Commission in 2015, and served on the commission as an appointee of Assembly speaker Robin Vos from September 2017 until his sudden resignation in June 2022. He served as chairman of the commission from June 2018 through June 2020, and was expected to serve as chair again from June 2022 to June 2024, but he resigned suddenly after losing the support of Republican leaders in the state.

Previously, Knudson was a member of the Wisconsin State Assembly, representing parts of St. Croix and Pierce counties from 2011 to 2017. He also served as the 52nd Mayor of Hudson, Wisconsin, from April 2008 until November 2010, when he resigned after his election to the Assembly.

== Early life and career ==
Knudson was born in Mayville, North Dakota, and raised on his family's farm. He graduated from Mayville-Portland High School and attended North Dakota State University. He went on to receive his Doctor of Veterinary Medicine degree from Iowa State University in 1986.

After receiving his degree, he moved to Florida with his wife, Joy, to start a veterinary practice. But they returned to the midwest just a few years later, in 1989, settling at Hudson, Wisconsin. They continued their veterinary practice and became involved in local affairs, including the Hudson Chamber of Commerce and Rotary Club.

== Political career ==
=== Hudson (1996–2008) ===
Knudson first became involved with politics after the Hudson City Council voted to raise taxes in 1996. He ran for and won a seat on the council with a tax-cutting agenda, and was re-elected twice. He left office in 2002 to devote more attention to his family and business, but, in 2008, Hudson's long-time Mayor, Jack Breault, announced he would not seek another term. Knudson decided to run.

The 2008 mayoral election took an unusual twist when Knudson's opponent, Todd Erskine, suspended his campaign and released an endorsement of Knudson. "I think he's more qualified for the job," Erskine said of Knudson. "So I'm supporting him." In 2010, he again did not face serious opposition when seeking re-election. He defeated a write-in candidate, 24-year-old Iraq War veteran Kevin Hartman, with over 93% of the vote.

=== Wisconsin Legislature (2011–2017) ===
Only a few weeks after winning re-election as mayor, however, Knudson declared he would run for the Wisconsin State Assembly to replace incumbent Kitty Rhoades, who did not plan to seek re-election. Knudson was not opposed in the Republican primary and won a strong majority in the general election, defeating Democrat Matt Borup with 62% of the vote. He was re-elected in 2012 and 2014, but declined to run for a fourth term in 2016.

During the 2015–2016 session of the Legislature, Knudson lead the push in the Wisconsin Assembly to overhaul the Wisconsin Government Accountability Board. The legislature ultimately acted to abolish the Accountability Board, which had overseen state campaigns, elections, and ethics laws since 2008, and replaced it with two new commissions—the Wisconsin Elections Commission and the Wisconsin Ethics Commission.

=== Elections Commission (2017–present) ===
One of the first appointees to the new Wisconsin Elections Commission was Republican businessman Steve King, to the seat reserved for the appointee of the Speaker of the Wisconsin State Assembly. But only a few months after beginning that role, he was nominated by President Donald Trump to serve as U.S. Ambassador to the Czech Republic. Upon his confirmation as Ambassador, in August 2017, King resigned from the commission. Knudson was subsequently appointed by Speaker Robin Vos to replace him on the Wisconsin Elections Commission.

Knudson was chosen by the commissioners for a two-year term as chairman in 2018.

Knudson became a controversial figure with state Republicans following the 2020 United States presidential election, when Knudson, a Republican, acknowledged that the election had been fair and that Joe Biden was the legitimate winner of Wisconsin's electoral votes. Knudson was the subject of public and personal attacks from elected Republicans and right wing commentators for much of 2021 and 2022, and also became a Republican target for voting with Democratic members of the commission to approve additional absentee voter options in the midst of the COVID-19 pandemic, although in most cases those decisions by the commission were unanimous. Republicans began calling for his resignation shortly after the 2020 election.

The Wisconsin Election Commission chair is chosen by the members of the commission every two years, alternating between Republican and Democratic chairs. The May 25, 2022, session of the commission was set to choose the next chair from among the Republican members, to serve from June 2022 through June 2024. Knudson was widely expected to be elected chair, but he surprised the state by announcing instead that he would resign from the commission because he felt he had lost the support of his party.

Knudson said, "integrity demands acknowledging the truth, even when the truth is painful. In this case, the painful truth is that President (Donald) Trump lost the election in 2020, lost the election in Wisconsin in 2020, and the loss was not due to election fraud," and continued, "Now, it’s become clear to me that I cannot be effective in my role of representing Republicans on the commission."

Knudson said he would continue to serve until his successor was named by Speaker Robin Vos, but would not accept the role of chairman. His term on the commission was scheduled to last until June 2024.

== Personal life ==
Knudson married Joy Schlichting in 1987, they have two adult children. Both Knudson and his wife are veterinary doctors.

== Electoral history ==
=== Hudson Mayor (2008, 2010) ===
| Year | Election | Date | Elected | | | | Defeated | | | | Total | Plurality |
|---|---|---|---|---|---|---|---|---|---|---|---|---|
| 2008 | General | Apr. 1 | Dean Knudson | Nonpartisan | 1,556 | 87.32% | R. Todd Erskine (withdrawn) | Non. | 226 | 12.68% | 1,782 | 1,330 |
| 2010 | General | Apr. 6 | Dean Knudson (inc) | Nonpartisan | 702 | 94.86% | Kevin Hartman (write-in) | Non. | 38 | 5.14% | 740 | 664 |

=== Wisconsin Assembly (2010–2014) ===
| Year | Election | Date | Elected | | | | Defeated | | | | Total | Plurality |
|---|---|---|---|---|---|---|---|---|---|---|---|---|
| 2010 | General | Nov. 2 | Dean Knudson | Republican | 14,124 | 62.00% | Matt Borup | Dem. | 8,629 | 37.88% | 22,780 | 5,495 |
| 2012 | General | Nov. 6 | Dean Knudson (inc) | Republican | 17,261 | 55.79% | Diane Odeen | Dem. | 13,657 | 44.14% | 30,938 | 3,604 |
| 2014 | General | Nov. 4 | Dean Knudson (inc) | Republican | 13,951 | 59.70% | Darrel Laumann | Dem. | 8,658 | 37.05% | 23,368 | 5,293 |
| 2014 | General | Nov. 4 | Dean Knudson (inc) | Republican | 13,951 | 59.70% | Laurie Kroeger | Ind. | 747 | 3.20% | 23,368 | 5,293 |

Wisconsin State Assembly
| Preceded by Kitty Rhoades | Member of the Wisconsin State Assembly from the 30th district January 3, 2011 – January 3, 2017 | Succeeded by Shannon Zimmerman |
Political offices
| Preceded by Jack Breault | Mayor of Hudson, Wisconsin; April 15, 2008 – November 5, 2010 | Succeeded by Alan Burchill |
Legal offices
| Preceded by Mark L. Thomsen | Chairman of the Wisconsin Elections Commission; June 11, 2018 – June 3, 2020 | Succeeded by Ann S. Jacobs |
