= Montana (community), Wisconsin =

Montana, Wisconsin
- Unincorporated community
- Location within Wisconsin Location within the United States
- Coordinates: 44°20′29″N 91°39′54″W
- Country: United States
- State: Wisconsin
- County: Buffalo
- Town: Montana
- Elevation: 814 ft (248 m)
- Time zone: UTC-6 (Central (CST))
  - Summer (DST): UTC-5 (CDT)
- Area codes: 715 & 534
- GNIS feature ID: 1569667

Montana is an unincorporated community located in the town of Montana, in Buffalo County, Wisconsin, United States. Montana is located at the junction of County Highways C and U, 11.5 miles (18.5 km) northeast of Cochrane.

== History ==
A post office called Montana was established in 1873, and remained in operation until 1907. The community was named after the Montana Territory.
