= Ben Brancel =

American politician (born 1950)

7th & 10th Secretary of the Wisconsin Department of Agriculture, Trade and Consumer Protection
- In office January 3, 2011 – August 13, 2017
- Governor: Scott Walker
- Preceded by: Randall Romanski (acting)
- Succeeded by: Sheila Harsdorf
- In office November 2, 1997 – February 15, 2001
- Governor: Tommy Thompson
- Preceded by: Joseph E. Tregoning (acting)
- Succeeded by: James Harsdorf

73rd Speaker of the Wisconsin State Assembly
- In office January 3, 1997 – November 2, 1997
- Preceded by: David Prosser Jr.
- Succeeded by: Scott Jensen

Member of the Wisconsin State Assembly from the 42nd district
- In office January 5, 1987 – November 2, 1997
- Preceded by: Tommy Thompson
- Succeeded by: Joan Wade

Personal details
- Born: July 31, 1950 (age 76) Portage, Wisconsin, U.S.
- Party: Republican
- Spouse: Gail
- Education: University of Wisconsin–Platteville

Ben Brancel (born July 31, 1950) is a retired American farmer and Republican politician from Marquette County, Wisconsin. He served as the 7th and 10th secretary of the Wisconsin Department of Agriculture, Trade and Consumer Protection, during the administrations of governors Tommy Thompson and Scott Walker. Earlier, he was the 73rd speaker of the Wisconsin State Assembly, having served 10 years in the Assembly, representing the 42nd Assembly district.

== Biography ==
Born in Portage, Wisconsin, Brancel graduated from the University of Wisconsin–Platteville. Brancel served on the town board and board of education. Brancel managed a dairy operation for 22 years and now runs a 290-acre family farm with his wife, son, and daughter-in-law. From 1987 until 1997, he served in the Wisconsin State Assembly representing District 42, and served as Speaker of the House. In 1997, Brancel resigned from the Wisconsin Assembly to serve as Wisconsin Secretary of Agriculture, Trade, and Consumer Protection in Governor Tommy Thompson's administration. He served in that capacity until 2001. In 2001, Brancel was appointed as director of the Wisconsin Farm Service Agency by the Bush Administration, where he served until early 2009. Later that year, he served as the part-time state relations liaison for the University of Wisconsin-Madison's College of Agricultural and Life Sciences.

In January 2011, Brancel was appointed by Governor Scott Walker to serve as Agriculture, Trade, and Consumer Protection Secretary once again.

Wisconsin State Assembly
Preceded by Tommy Thompson	Member of the Wisconsin State Assembly from the 42nd district January 5, 1987 – November 2, 1997	Succeeded by Joan Wade
Preceded by David Prosser Jr.	Speaker of the Wisconsin State Assembly; January 3, 1997 – November 2, 1997	Succeeded by Scott Jensen
Government offices
Preceded by Joseph E. Tregoning (acting)	Secretary of the Wisconsin Department of Agriculture, Trade and Consumer Protection; November 2, 1997 – February 15, 2001	Succeeded by James Harsdorf
Preceded by Randall Romanski (acting)	Secretary of the Wisconsin Department of Agriculture, Trade and Consumer Protection; January 3, 2011 – August 13, 2017	Succeeded by Sheila Harsdorf
