= Michael P. Early =

American politician

2nd Secretary of the Wisconsin Department of Veterans Affairs
- In office August 15, 1977 – November 1, 1977
- Governor: Martin J. Schreiber
- Preceded by: Clifford R. Wills (acting)
- Succeeded by: John R. Moses

Member of the Wisconsin State Assembly
- In office January 1, 1973 – August 15, 1977
- Preceded by: District established
- Succeeded by: James Harsdorf
- Constituency: 30th district
- In office January 4, 1971 – January 1, 1973
- Preceded by: Stanley York
- Succeeded by: District abolished
- Constituency: Buffalo–Pepin–Pierce district

Personal details
- Born: March 10, 1918 New Richmond, Wisconsin, U.S.
- Died: March 29, 1993 (aged 75) River Falls Hospital; River Falls, Wisconsin, U.S.
- Cause of death: Heart attack
- Resting place: Immaculate Conception Catholic Church Cemetery, New Richmond, Wisconsin
- Party: Democratic
- Spouse: Dorothy E. Burke (m. 1944–1993)
- Children: 7
- Occupation: plumber, contractor, politician

Military service
- Allegiance: United States
- Branch/service: United States Army
- Years of service: 1941–1945
- Battles/wars: World War II: Pacific War

Michael Patrick Early (March 10, 1918 – March 29, 1993) was an American plumber, contractor, and Democratic politician. He served six years in the Wisconsin State Assembly, representing Buffalo, Pepin, and Pierce counties. He was briefly the 2nd Secretary of the Wisconsin Department of Veterans Affairs, but the firing of his predecessor was invalidated by the Wisconsin Supreme Court just three months after he was appointed.

== Biography ==
Early was born on March 10, 1918, in New Richmond, Wisconsin. He graduated from New Richmond High School in 1935 and went to work as a plumber and pipefitter. In 1941, he enlisted for service in the United States Army a month before the Attack on Pearl Harbor. Originally planning to enter the Corps of Engineers, he was eventually assigned to the Airborne Infantry in the Pacific theater of World War II. He received a medical discharge in 1945. On his return, he attended Washburne Technical School in Chicago, was certified a master plumber, and became a plumbing and heating contractor.

From 1963 to 1971, Early was Police Commissioner of River Falls, Wisconsin. In 1970 he entered the race for Wisconsin State Assembly to fill the open seat representing Buffalo, Pepin, and Pierce counties. He prevailed in a tight election with Duanne Johnson of Pepin County, carrying only his home county, Pierce, but by a large enough margin to win the overall vote. Early was subsequently reelected three times.

Early was licensed as an aircraft pilot in 1962 and owned his own single-engine plane, a Mooney M20. While serving in the Assembly, he used his plane to commute to the Wisconsin State Capitol, and sometimes shuttled other representatives with him.

In 1977, he resigned his Assembly seat after he was appointed Secretary of the Wisconsin Department of Veterans Affairs by the state Veterans Affairs Board. The previous secretary, John R. Moses, had been fired by the board.

Moses had been leading the Department of Veterans Affairs for over 15 years due to a quirk of the law which created his position placing no term limit. By the 1970s, with a lifetime appointment and the support of state veterans groups, he had become a powerful political force in the state. He had a difficult relationship with Governor Patrick Lucey, and, in 1977, he had run into additional controversy over the handling of a veterans' mortgage program, which appeared to be allowing certain mortgage servicers to skim a percentage of the benefits. At Lucey's urging, the Legislature voted to allow the Veterans Affairs Board the right to terminate Moses' employment. Moses subsequently announced he would resign, but then attempted to withdraw his resignation following the resignation of Governor Lucey. Moses feuded for months with the Veterans Affairs Board until they finally voted to remove him from office in May 1977. Moses, however, sued the Board and, in November 1977, the Wisconsin Supreme Court ruled in his favor, invalidating his firing.

With his appointment to Veterans Affairs invalidated and having already resigned his Assembly seat, Early was left without a job. Governor Martin J. Schreiber appointed him administrator of the Division of Emergency Government (civil defense) in the Department of Local Affairs and Development, where he served until his retirement in 1982.

== Personal life and family ==
Early married Dorothy E. Burke of Minneapolis on July 27, 1945, in Chicago. They had six sons and one daughter.

Michael Early died at River Falls Hospital in 1993, after suffering a heart attack.

Wisconsin State Assembly
Preceded by Stanley York	Member of the Wisconsin State Assembly from the Buffalo–Pepin–Pierce district January 4, 1971 – January 1, 1973	District abolished
New district	Member of the Wisconsin State Assembly from the 30th district January 1, 1973 – August 15, 1977	Succeeded by James Harsdorf
Government offices
Preceded by Clifford R. Wills (acting)	Secretary of the Wisconsin Department of Veterans Affairs; August 15, 1977 – November 1, 1977	Succeeded by John R. Moses
