= Stanley York =

American politician (1931–2024)

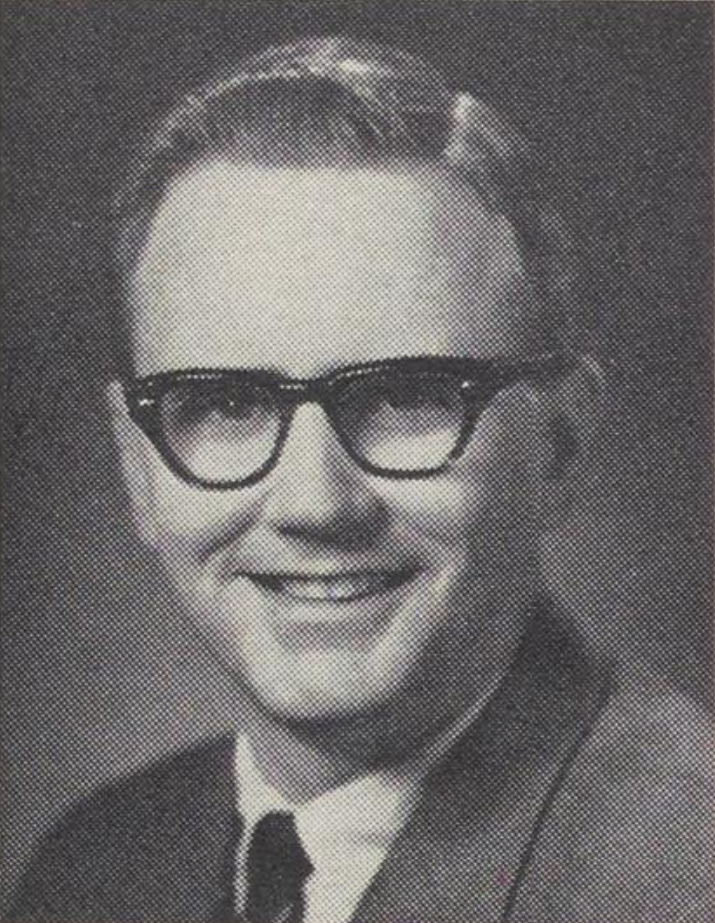

Member of the Wisconsin State Assembly from the Buffalo–Pepin–Pierce district
- In office January 2, 1967 – February 1, 1970
- Preceded by: Milton S. Buchli
- Succeeded by: Michael P. Early

Personal details
- Born: August 29, 1931 Milwaukee, Wisconsin, U.S.
- Died: July 21, 2024 (aged 92)
- Party: Republican
- Children: 3
- Education: Beloit College (B.A.); Andover Newton Theological School (B.D.)

Stanley York (August 29, 1931 – July 21, 2024) was an American Republican politician and minister from River Falls, Wisconsin. He was a member of the Wisconsin State Assembly, representing Buffalo, Pepin, and Pierce counties from 1967 until his resignation in 1970.

== Early life and career ==
Born in Milwaukee, Wisconsin, York attended Wauwatosa, Wisconsin public schools. In 1953, he graduated from Beloit College and then graduated from Andover Newton Theological School in 1957 with a degree in theology. Following his graduation from Andover Newton, York made his way to Waushara County, where he served as a pastor in Redgranite and Berlin in neighboring Green Lake County. He soon moved to River Falls, Wisconsin, where he became a pastor for the First Congregational Church in the city.

== Political career ==
In the initial stages of the 1966 campaign, York sat on a committee to seek a Republican candidate to face incumbent Democrat Milton S. Buchli, however was later convinced to run by his colleagues. After serving as pastor for that church for four years, York took a partial leave of absence and announced his campaign for state Assembly in the Buffalo–Pepin–Pierce district against Buchli. York's campaign focused on his background as a pastor, and advocated for a policy of fiscal responsibility and welfare reform. During his campaign he also faced questions over whether he could be both a pastor and a politician. In the lead-up to the November election, the district was increasingly viewed by Republican campaign strategists as vulnerable to flipping. On the day of the election York defeated Buchli and aided in flipping the State Assembly back to Republican control. His campaign was described as well-organized in several local newspapers.

York was sworn in on January 2, 1967. He gave the opening prayer for the state assembly that term. One of the first bills York introduced that session, on February 2, would have allowed banks to set up new branches within their own county if no other banks operated in a municipality, which was previously illegal. He also introduced a second bill to require a 15-day drivers license suspension for motorists convicted of going 20 miles or more over local speed limits. The bill later was taken up by state senator Robert P. Knowles, however it faced opposition from the banking industry. To prevent future instances of bribery, like had been seen a year prior, York proposed a bill in April, cosponsored by Speaker Harold V. Froehlich and assistant majority leader David Martin, which would clarify what outside funds legislators were allowed to accept. It would also bar legislators from accepting money for speaking within their districts.

During his first term he was regarded in the Wisconsin press as a rising figure in state politics and future leader.

== Post-legislative career ==
In 1970, he resigned from the assembly to accept Governor Warren P. Knowles's appointment as a member of the Industry, Labor and Human Relations Commission.

In 1976, he was a candidate for the United States Senate, losing to incumbent William Proxmire 72% to 27%. Following his defeat he helped fuel speculation on his political future when he announced he was considering a future run for statewide office. Republican figures and state newspapers speculated that he would run for governor in 1978 against then-governor Patrick Lucey. However York ended almost a year and a half of speculation when he declined to run for the nomination in May 1978.

== Personal life ==
York died at the age of 92 on July 21, 2024.

== Electoral history ==
=== Wisconsin Assembly (1966, 1968) ===
Year	Election	Date	Elected				Defeated				Total	Plurality
1966	General	Nov. 8	Stanley York	Republican	6,166	55.38%	Milton S. Buchli (inc)	Dem.	4,967	44.62%	11,133	1,199
1968	General	Nov. 5	Stanley York (inc)	Republican	11,278	64.10%	Etta Close	Dem.	6,317	35.90%	17,595	4,961

=== U.S. Senate (1976) ===
Year	Election	Date	Elected				Defeated				Total	Plurality
1976	General	Nov. 2	William Proxmire (inc)	Democratic	1,396,970	72.20%	Stanley York	Rep.	521,902	26.97%	1,935,183	875,068
1976	General	Nov. 2	William Proxmire (inc)	Democratic	1,396,970	72.20%	William Hart	Ind.	7,354	0.38%	1,935,183	875,068
1976	General	Nov. 2	William Proxmire (inc)	Democratic	1,396,970	72.20%	Robert Schwarz	Ind.	4,876	0.25%	1,935,183	875,068
1976	General	Nov. 2	William Proxmire (inc)	Democratic	1,396,970	72.20%	Michael A. MacLaurin	Ind.	2,148	0.11%	1,935,183	875,068
1976	General	Nov. 2	William Proxmire (inc)	Democratic	1,396,970	72.20%	Robert Nordlander	Ind.	1,731	0.09%	1,935,183	875,068

Wisconsin State Assembly
Preceded by Milton S. Buchli	Member of the Wisconsin State Assembly from the Buffalo-Pepin-Pierce district 1967–1970	Succeeded by Michael P. Early
Party political offices
Preceded by John E. Erickson	Republican nominee for U.S. Senator from Wisconsin (Class 1); 1976	Succeeded by Scott McCallum
