= 1976 United States Senate election in Wisconsin =

- November 2, 1976
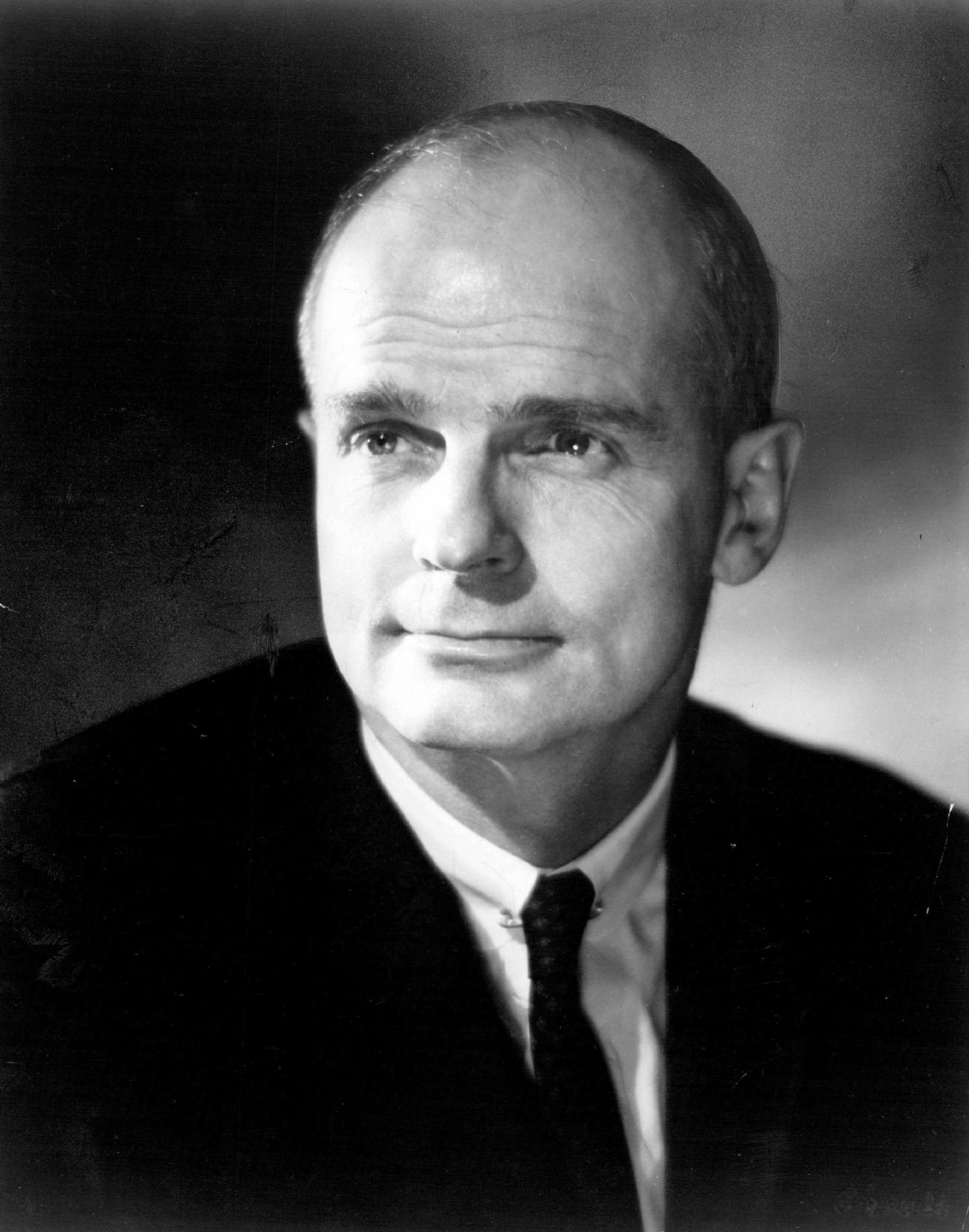

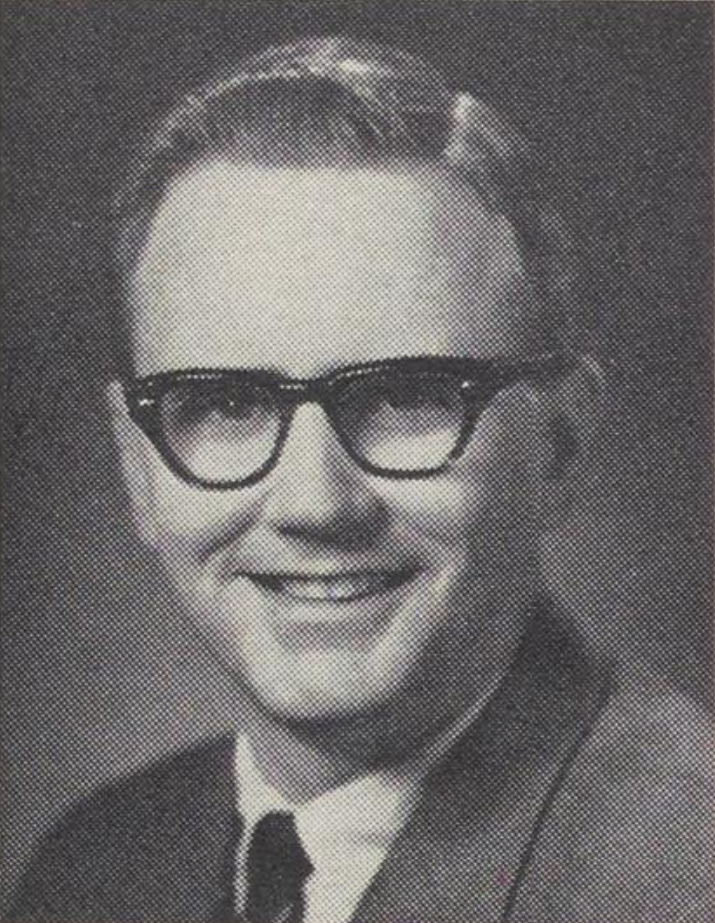
Nominee	William Proxmire	Stanley York
Party	Democratic	Republican
Popular vote	1,396,970	521,902
Percentage	72.20%	26.97%
- County results Proxmire: 50–60% 60–70% 70–80% 80–90%
U.S. senator before election
William Proxmire
Democratic
Elected U.S. Senator
William Proxmire
Democratic

The 1976 United States Senate election in Wisconsin was held on November 2, 1976. Incumbent Democrat William Proxmire defeated Republican nominee Stanley York in a landslide, taking 72.20% of the vote.

== General election ==
=== Candidates ===
- William O. Hart (Independent)
- Michael A. MacLaurin (Independent)
- Robert E. Nordlander (Socialist Labor)
- William Proxmire, incumbent senator since 1957 (Democratic)
- Robert Schwarz (Socialist Workers)
- Stanley York, former state representative from River Falls (Republican)

=== Results ===
1976 United States Senate election in Wisconsin
Party	Candidate	Votes	%	±%
Democratic	William Proxmire (incumbent)	1,396,970	72.20%	
Republican	Stanley York	521,902	26.97%	
Independent	William O. Hart	7,354	0.38%	
Socialist Workers	Robert Schwarz	4,876	0.25%	
Independent	Michael A. MacLaurin	2,148	0.11%	
Socialist Labor	Robert E. Nordlander	1,731	0.09%	
Majority		875,068		
Turnout		1,935,183		
Democratic hold		Swing		

== See also ==
- 1976 United States Senate elections
