= Wisconsin Department of Agriculture, Trade and Consumer Protection =

Wisconsin government agency that regulates agriculture, trade & commercial activity

Agency overview
- Formed: 1929
- Preceding agencies: Wisconsin Department of Agriculture (1915–1929); Wisconsin Department of Markets (1921–1929)
- Jurisdiction: Wisconsin
- Headquarters: 2811 Agriculture Dr; Madison, Wisconsin; 43°3′37.512″N 89°17′18.672″W
- Employees: 630.29 (2019)
- Annual budget: $193,595,700 (2019)
- Agency executives: Randy Romanski, Secretary; Angela James, Deputy Secretary; Eric Ebersberger, Assistant Deputy Secretary
- Parent agency: State of Wisconsin
- Website: http://www.datcp.wi.gov/

The Wisconsin Department of Agriculture, Trade and Consumer Protection is a governmental agency of the U.S. state of Wisconsin responsible for regulating agriculture, trade, and commercial activity in the state. The department is administered by a secretary who is appointed by the governor and confirmed by the Senate.

The department is directed and supervised by a nine-member Board of Agriculture, Trade and Consumer Protection, who serve staggered six year terms and are appointed by the governor. Two of the board members are required to be consumer representatives, while the other seven are required to have an agricultural background.

== History ==
The department traces its history back to the Wisconsin Territory, with early efforts to establish inspection of food and other farm products and establish a program to regulate weights and measures. County treasurers were then empowered to enforce standards. In 1867, the state government established a position under the State Treasurer to enforce further quality standards. That system was supplemented in 1889 with the creation of the Office of Dairy and Food Commissioner to enforce food safety, food labeling, and laws on weights and measures. The state also established a State Veterinarian to evaluate farm animals, a state board of agriculture, an inspector of apiaries, a state orchard and nursery inspector, a state supervisor of illuminating oils, and a state humane agent.

The first state Department of Agriculture was created in 1915 by Governor Emanuel L. Philipp, by merging the functions of these several different inspectors and regulators. The department was led by a commissioner, appointed by the governor and confirmed by the State Senate.

The Division of Markets was created within the department of Agriculture in 1919, in order to improve and promote the market for Wisconsin farm products. The division was established as a separate Department of Markets in 1921, and granted additional powers to regulate unfair competition and trade practices.

The Departments of Agriculture and the Department of Markets were re-combined in 1929 as the Department of Agriculture and Markets. The department was overseen by three commissioners who were all appointed by the governor, and a secretary selected by the commissioners.

In 1939, the department was renamed the Department of Agriculture. The department was then overseen by a seven-member Board of Agriculture, who were all appointed by the governor and confirmed by the state Senate. All seven members were required to have an agricultural background. This board appointed the department's Secretary.

The department was renamed again in 1977 to its present name—the Department of Agriculture, Trade and Consumer Protection. The 1977 law also established that one of the seven members of the Board of Agriculture must be a consumer representative.

In 1995, the state legislature changed the law around appointment of the secretary of the department, allowing for a direct gubernatorial appointment, rather than a selection by the Board. The Board was also expanded to eight members, with two being consumer representatives. The Board was expanded again in 1997 to nine members.

== Divisions ==
- Agricultural Development: promotes Wisconsin products and provides counseling and mediation services to farmers
- Agricultural Resource Management: protects resources and public health
- Animal Health: works to diagnose, prevent, and control serious animal diseases
- Food Safety: regulates food production
- Management Services: provides the administrative work for the department
- Trade and Consumer Protection: enforces consumer protection laws

== Secretaries and Commissioners ==
=== Commissioners of Agriculture (1915–1929) ===
Commissioner	Took office	Left office	Notes
Christian P. Norgord	August 5, 1915	May 24, 1923	Appointed by Governor Emanuel L. Philipp. Reappointed by Governor John J. Blaine.
John D. Jones Jr.	May 24, 1923	March 24, 1927	Appointed by Governor John J. Blaine.
Walter A. Duffy	March 24, 1927	September 16, 1929	Appointed by Governor Fred R. Zimmerman. Served until position abolished.

=== Commissioners of Markets (1919–1929) ===
Commissioner	Took office	Left office	Notes
James B. Borden	August 21, 1919	August 22, 1919	Selected by committee, confirmed by Governor Emanuel L. Philipp. Resigned due to conflicts of interest.
Edward Nordman	August 28, 1919	September 6, 1927	Selected by committee, confirmed by Governor Emanuel L. Philipp.
James Vint	September 12, 1927	September 16, 1929	Appointed by Fred R. Zimmerman. Served until position abolished.

=== Secretary of Agriculture and Markets (1929–1937) ===
Secretary	Took office	Left office	Notes
Oscar J. Thompson	January 1, 1930	1937	Appointed by the Commission of Agriculture and Markets.

=== Secretaries (1967–present) ===
#	Secretary	Took office	Left office	Notes
1	Donald N. McDowell	August 1, 1967	April 1, 1969	Appointed by Board.
2	Donald Wilkinson	April 1, 1969	July 24, 1975	Appointed by Board.
–	Arthur Kurtz	July 24, 1975	January 19, 1976	Acting secretary
3	Gary E. Rohde	January 19, 1976	August 17, 1981	Appointed by Board.
–	Joseph Tuss	August 17, 1981	November 1, 1981	Acting secretary
4	La Verne Ausman	November 1, 1981	December 19, 1985	Appointed by Board.
–	John Cottingham	December 19, 1985	May 1, 1986	Acting secretary
5	Howard C. Richards	May 1, 1986	April 13, 1990	Appointed by Board.
6	Alan Tracy	April 13, 1990	July 31, 1997	Appointed by Board.
–	Joseph E. Tregoning	August 1, 1997	November 2, 1997	Acting secretary
7	Ben Brancel	November 2, 1997	February 15, 2001	Appointed by Governor Tommy Thompson.
8	James Harsdorf	February 15, 2001	January 6, 2003	Appointed by Governor Scott McCallum.
9	Rod Nilsestuen	January 6, 2003	July 21, 2010	Appointed by Governor Jim Doyle. Died in office.
–	Randall Romanski	July 21, 2010	January 3, 2011	Acting secretary
10	Ben Brancel	January 3, 2011	August 13, 2017	Appointed by Governor Scott Walker.
11	Sheila Harsdorf	November 13, 2017	January 7, 2019	Appointed by Governor Scott Walker.
12	Brad Pfaff	January 7, 2019	November 5, 2019	Appointed by Governor Tony Evers, never confirmed.
13	Randall Romanski	November 5, 2019	present	Acting secretary until September 28, 2021. Appointed by Governor Tony Evers.
