= Montana, Wisconsin =

- Town
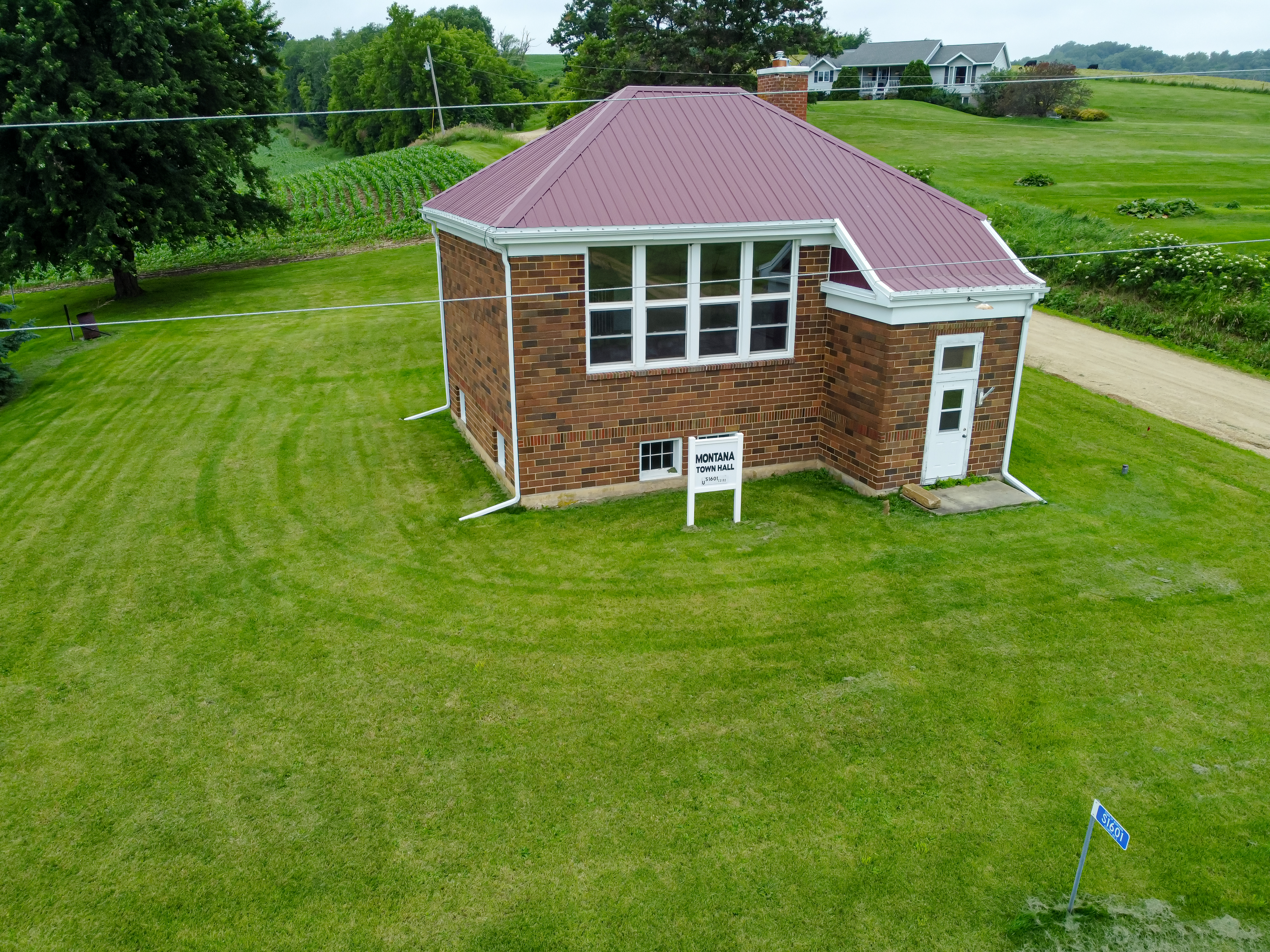
- Town hall

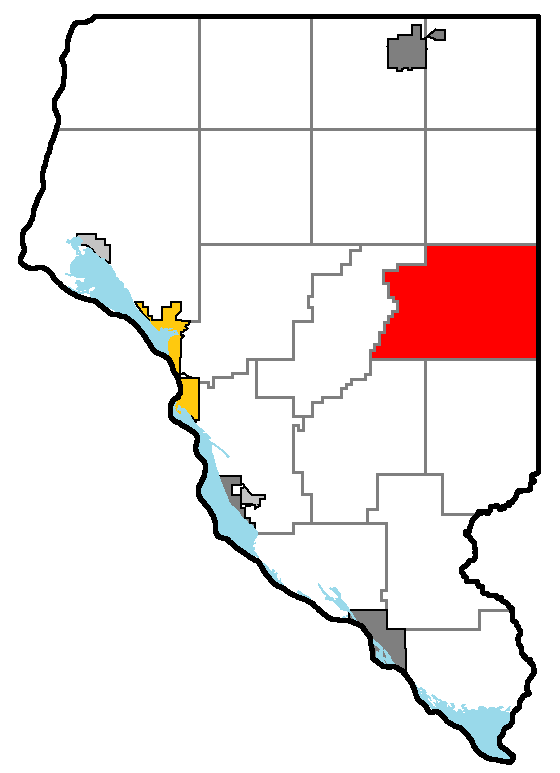
- Location of Montana, Buffalo County

- Location of Buffalo County
- Coordinates: 44°22′19″N 91°36′50″W
- Country: United States
- State: Wisconsin
- County: Buffalo

Area
  - Total: 47.2 sq mi (122.2 km^{2})
  - Land: 47.1 sq mi (122.1 km^{2})
  - Water: 0.039 sq mi (0.1 km^{2})
- Elevation: 879 ft (268 m)

Population (2020)
  - Total: 268
  - Density: 5.68/sq mi (2.19/km^{2})
- Time zone: UTC-6 (Central (CST))
  - Summer (DST): UTC-5 (CDT)
- FIPS code: 55-53850
- GNIS feature ID: 1583742
- Website: https://montanawi.gov/

Montana is a town in Buffalo County in the U.S. state of Wisconsin. The population was 268 at the 2020 census. The unincorporated community of Montana is located in the town.

== Geography ==
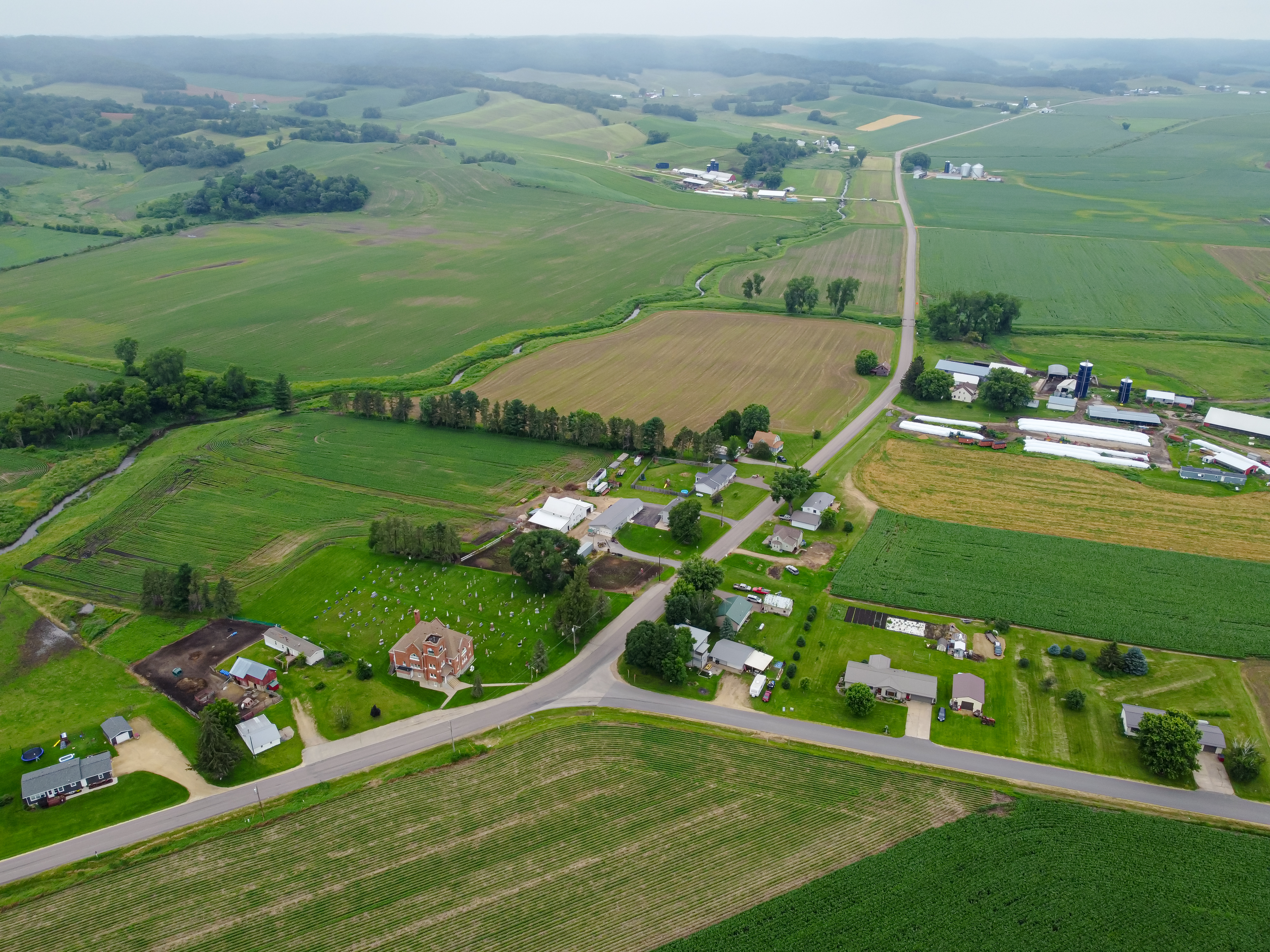
County C and County U junction in town

Montana is located along the eastern border of Buffalo County, with Trempealeau County to the east. According to the United States Census Bureau, the town has a total area of 47.2 square miles (122.2 km^{2}), of which 47.1 square miles (122.1 km^{2}) is land and 0.039 square miles (0.1 km^{2}), or 0.09%, is water.

== Demographics ==
As of the census of 2000, there were 306 people, 109 households, and 80 families residing in the town. The population density was 6.5 people per square mile (2.5/km^{2}). There were 116 housing units at an average density of 2.5 per square mile (0.9/km^{2}). The racial makeup of the town was 99.67% White, and 0.33% from two or more races.

There were 109 households, out of which 42.2% had children under the age of 18 living with them, 62.4% were married couples living together, 3.7% had a female householder with no husband present, and 26.6% were non-families. 25.7% of all households were made up of individuals, and 7.3% had someone living alone who was 65 years of age or older. The average household size was 2.81 and the average family size was 3.36.

In the town, the population was spread out, with 32.4% under the age of 18, 4.9% from 18 to 24, 33.0% from 25 to 44, 20.3% from 45 to 64, and 9.5% who were 65 years of age or older. The median age was 35 years. For every 100 females, there were 94.9 males. For every 100 females age 18 and over, there were 111.2 males.

The median income for a household in the town was $34,375, and the median income for a family was $42,000. Males had a median income of $26,250 versus $20,625 for females. The per capita income for the town was $18,708. None of the families and 3.3% of the population were living below the poverty line.

== History ==
The town of Montana was created on November 12, 1867. The town's first settlers were Christian Kindschy, Ulrich Von Wald and August Helwig.

== Notable people ==
- Milton S. Buchli, legislator
- Bill Moffitt, Father of Billie Jean King
