= James Harsdorf =

American politician (born 1950)

8th Secretary of the Wisconsin Department of Agriculture, Trade and Consumer Protection
- In office February 15, 2001 – January 6, 2003
- Governor: Scott McCallum
- Preceded by: Ben Brancel
- Succeeded by: Rod Nilsestuen

Minority Leader of the Wisconsin Senate
- In office January 3, 1983 – January 7, 1985
- Preceded by: Walter Chilsen
- Succeeded by: Susan Engeleiter

Member of the Wisconsin Senate from the 10th district
- In office January 5, 1981 – January 2, 1989
- Preceded by: Michele Radosevich
- Succeeded by: Richard Shoemaker

Member of the Wisconsin State Assembly from the 30th district
- In office November 7, 1977 – January 5, 1981
- Preceded by: Michael P. Early
- Succeeded by: Jule Berndt

Personal details
- Born: November 7, 1950 (age 76) Stillwater, Minnesota, U.S.
- Party: Republican
- Spouse: Lanette
- Children: 4
- Relatives: Sheila Harsdorf (sister)
- Education: University of Minnesota
- Occupation: Farmer

James E. Harsdorf (born November 7, 1950) is an American dairy farmer and Republican politician from the Pierce County, Wisconsin. He was the 8th secretary of the Wisconsin Department of Agriculture, Trade and Consumer Protection, serving in the administration of Governor Scott McCallum, and previously served eight years in the Wisconsin Senate and three years in the State Assembly, representing parts of northwestern Wisconsin. His sister, Sheila Harsdorf, also served in the state Legislature, representing both districts he had, and was later secretary of the same department.

== Biography ==
Born in Stillwater, Minnesota, Harsdorf graduated from the University of Minnesota with a degree in animal science. He was elected to the Wisconsin State Assembly in a 1977 special election, defeating future Wisconsin Secretary of Agriculture Rod Nilsestuen, and served until 1981. He won election to the Wisconsin State Senate in 1980, defeating first-term incumbent Democrat Michele Radosevich. He served from 1981 to 1989.

In 1996, he ran for the United States House of Representatives in the open seat for Wisconsin's 3rd congressional district. He was defeated by Democrat Ron Kind, receiving 48% of the vote.

Harsdorf's younger sister, Sheila, was elected to his former assembly seat in 1988, and served in that body until 1999. She subsequently ran for and won his old senate seat, serving from 2001 to 2017.

Wisconsin State Assembly
Preceded by Michael P. Early	Member of the Wisconsin State Assembly from the 30th district November 7, 1977 – January 5, 1981	Succeeded by Jule Berndt
Wisconsin Senate
Preceded by Michele Radosevich	Member of the Wisconsin Senate from the 10th district January 5, 1981 – January 2, 1989	Succeeded by Richard Shoemaker
Government offices
Preceded by Ben Brancel	Secretary of the Wisconsin Department of Agriculture, Trade and Consumer Protection; February 15, 2001 – January 6, 2003	Succeeded by Rod Nilsestuen
