= Milton S. Buchli =

20th century American politician

Member of the Wisconsin State Assembly from the Buffalo–Pepin–Pierce district
- In office January 4, 1965 – January 2, 1967
- Preceded by: Robert I. Johnson
- Succeeded by: Stanley York

Personal details
- Born: August 18, 1910 Montana, Wisconsin, U.S.
- Died: May 5, 2003 (aged 92)
- Party: Democratic
- Spouse: Erna Riesch
- Occupation: Farmer

Milton S. Buchli (August 18, 1910 – May 5, 2003) was a former American farmer and former Democratic politician in the state of Wisconsin.

== Biography ==
Buchli was born to Sam and Agnes Buchli in Montana, Wisconsin. He married Erna Riesch on June 4, 1941. Buchli died at age 93. He was a Methodist.

Buchli served as chairman of the Buffalo County, Wisconsin Democratic Party from 1950 to 1956, and was a member of the Wisconsin Democratic State Central Committee. In 1956 he unsuccessfully ran for a seat in the Wisconsin State Assembly. Eventually he was elected, serving in the Assembly from 1965 to 1966, when he was defeated by Stanley York. Buchli also worked as a school teacher and a farmer, and he served in the United States Army during World War II.

== See also ==
- The Political Graveyard
