= Kitty Rhoades =

American politician (1951–2016)

Secretary of the Wisconsin Department of Health Services
- In office February 22, 2013 – June 18, 2016
- Governor: Scott Walker
- Preceded by: Dennis Smith
- Succeeded by: Linda Seemeyer

Member of the Wisconsin State Assembly from the 30th district
- In office January 4, 1999 – January 3, 2011
- Preceded by: Sheila Harsdorf
- Succeeded by: Dean Knudson

Personal details
- Born: Kitty Richie; April 7, 1951 Hudson, Wisconsin, U.S.
- Died: June 18, 2016 (aged 64) Madison, Wisconsin, U.S.
- Party: Republican
- Education: University of Wisconsin–River Falls (BA); Illinois State University (MEd)

Kitty Rhoades (née Richie) (April 7, 1951 – June 18, 2016) was an American politician. She served as a member of the Wisconsin State Assembly, where she represented the 30th district, before serving as Secretary of the Wisconsin Department of Health Services.

== Early life and education ==
Born in Hudson, Wisconsin, Rhoades received a bachelor's degree from the University of Wisconsin–River Falls and a master's degree in education from Illinois State University.

== Career ==
Rhoades worked as an educator, small business owner, and consultant. In 1998, she was elected to the Wisconsin State Assembly as a Republican.

In the 1990s, Rhoades proposed the term Winnesota to describe Wisconsin's St. Croix and Pierce Counties, which border Minnesota and are within the U.S. Census Bureau's Minneapolis-Saint Paul Metropolitan Area. According to Rhoades, "I still call my area Winnesota. We are in Wisconsin, but it sure is hard to remember it."

Rhoades retired from the state Assembly in 2010, and took a position with the administration of then-Governor Scott Walker in 2011 as Deputy Secretary of the Department of Health Services. In February 2013, following the resignation of Dennis Smith, she was appointed Secretary.

== Death ==
Rhoades died on June 18, 2016, in Madison, Wisconsin from pneumonia.

== Electoral history ==
=== Wisconsin State Assembly (1998–2008) ===
Year	Election	Date	Elected				Defeated				Total	Plurality
1998	Primary	Sep. 8	Kitty Rhoades	Republican	2,788	68.25%	Jay Griggs	Rep.	1,297	31.75%	4,085	1,491
1998	General	Nov. 3	Kitty Rhoades	Republican	9,755	57.29%	James R. Johnson	Dem.	7,272	42.71%	17,027	2,483
2000	General	Nov. 7	Kitty Rhoades (inc)	Republican	17,303	62.76%	Laurie J. Lundgaard	Dem.	10,247	37.17%	27,568	7,056
2002	General	Nov. 5	Kitty Rhoades (inc)	Republican	12,563	69.01%	Bob Feickert	Dem.	5,635	30.95%	18,205	6,928
2004	General	Nov. 2	Kitty Rhoades (inc)	Republican	20,540	61.09%	Tom Parent	Dem.	13,071	38.87%	33,624	7,469
2006	General	Nov. 7	Kitty Rhoades (inc)	Republican	12,790	57.40%	Dan Gorman	Dem.	9,479	42.54%	22,282	3,311
2008	Primary	Sep. 9	Kitty Rhoades (inc)	Republican	2,432	86.70%	Bob Hughes	Rep.	372	13.26%	2,805	2,060
2008	General	Nov. 4	Kitty Rhoades (inc)	Republican	19,729	54.74%	Sarah A. Bruch	Dem.	16,278	45.17%	36,041	3,451
