= Sheila Harsdorf =

American politician (born 1956)

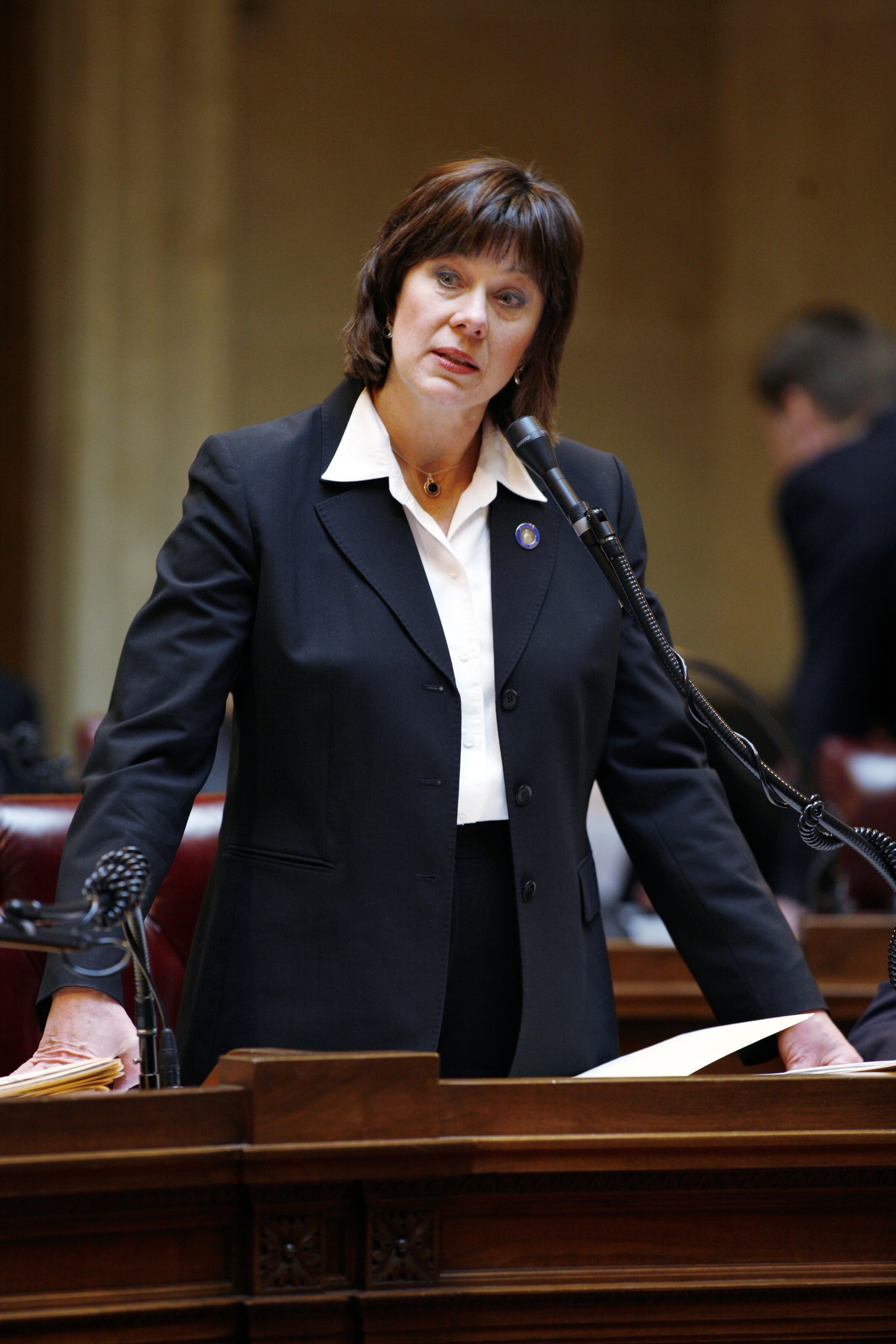
- Harsdorf in 2008

11th Secretary of the Wisconsin Department of Agriculture, Trade and Consumer Protection
- In office November 13, 2017 – January 7, 2019
- Governor: Scott Walker
- Preceded by: Ben Brancel
- Succeeded by: Brad Pfaff (acting)

Member of the Wisconsin Senate from the 10th district
- In office January 8, 2001 – November 10, 2017
- Preceded by: Alice Clausing
- Succeeded by: Patty Schachtner

Member of the Wisconsin State Assembly from the 30th district
- In office January 3, 1989 – January 4, 1999
- Preceded by: William Berndt
- Succeeded by: Kitty Rhoades

Personal details
- Born: July 25, 1956 (age 70) Stillwater, Minnesota, U.S.
- Party: Republican
- Children: 1
- Relatives: James Harsdorf (brother)
- Education: University of Minnesota
- Occupation: Dairy farmer, legislator

Sheila E. Harsdorf (born July 25, 1956) is an American dairy farmer and Republican politician from Pierce County, Wisconsin. She served as the 11th secretary of the Wisconsin Department of Agriculture, Trade and Consumer Protection, during the administration of Governor Scott Walker. She previously served ten years in the Wisconsin State Assembly and 17 years in the State Senate. Her brother, James Harsdorf, also served in the state Legislature, and was also secretary of the Wisconsin Department of Agriculture, Trade and Consumer Protection.

== Early life, education and career ==
Harsdorf was born in Stillwater, Minnesota, in 1956 and her family moved to River Falls, Wisconsin, in 1970. Harsdorf graduated from the University of Minnesota in 1978 with a B.S. in Animal Science, and returned to River Falls to become a loan officer for the Production Credit Association while farming part-time on the Harsdorf family dairy farm. Two years later, she and her older brother, Jim, became partners in the family business.

While farming full-time, Harsdorf was a member of the Pierce County Farm Bureau Board of Directors from 1982 to 1988, serving as treasurer for three years. She also served as chair of the Pierce County Dairy Promotion Committee in 1986. She was a member of the Board of Directors of the Pierce-Pepin Holstein Breeders Association, was a graduate of the Wisconsin Rural Leadership Program, and was involved in Pierce County 4-H as a member of the Dairy Committee and a coach of the Dairy Judging Team.

== Wisconsin legislature ==
=== State Assembly ===
In 1988, Harsdorf ran for and won the seat of the 30th Assembly District in the Wisconsin State Assembly. She won a total of five consecutive elections, finishing her last term in 1999.

During Harsdorf's time in the State Assembly, she served on the Assembly committees on Natural Resources, on Veterans and Military Affairs, and on Agriculture, and was the ranking Republican on the Colleges and Universities Committee. She also served on the Legislative Advisory Committee on the Minnesota-Wisconsin Boundary Area Commission and on the Legislative Council Special Committee on Land Use. In 1995, she was appointed to the prestigious Joint Finance Committee, a 16-member committee responsible for drafting the state's biennial budget.

=== State Senate ===
In 2000, Harsdorf entered the 10th State Senate District race against Democratic Senator Alice Clausing, a two-term incumbent. The 10th Senate District comprises all of St. Croix County and portions of Burnett, Dunn, Pierce and Polk counties in the northwestern part of the state. She defeated Clausing and independent candidate Jim Nelson in the general election. She was re-elected in 2004, defeating challenger Gary Bakke, and 2008, defeating challenger Alison Page.

Harsdorf served as chair of the Senate Committee on State and Federal Relations and Information Technology and vice chair of the Committee on Agriculture, Forestry, and Higher Education. She also served as co-chair of the Joint Committee on Information Policy and Technology, and as a member of the Joint Committee on Finance. She previously served as chair of the Higher Education and Tourism Committee, as the ranking Republican on the Agriculture and Higher Education Committee, and as a member of the Commerce, Utilities, Energy and Rail Committee and the Joint Legislative Council. She was also a member of the Mississippi River Parkway Commission.

==== Recall effort ====
Harsdorf was subject to a recall effort as part of the 2011 Wisconsin protests. Recall organizers filed an estimated 23,000 signatures with the Wisconsin Government Accountability Board, which verified the petitions and overruled challenges by Harsdorf. The recall election was set for August 9, 2011. Teacher and educators' union official Shelly Moore ran against Harsdorf in the recall election. Harsdorf defeated Moore, 58 percent to 42 percent in the recall election.

=== Cabinet appointment ===
In November 2017, Harsdorf was appointed Wisconsin Secretary of Agriculture, Trade and Consumer Protection by Governor Scott Walker. Her brother, Jim, had previously served in the same role under Governors Scott McCallum and Jim Doyle from 2001 to 2003. Harsdorf is the first woman to head DATCP in the department's 88-year history.

== Personal life ==
In her hometown of River Falls, Harsdorf is a member of Luther Memorial Church. Harsdorf is a past member of the Kinnickinnic River Land Trust Board and the Wisconsin Conservation Corps Board. She is also a former president of the Wisconsin FFA Foundation Sponsor's Board.

== Electoral history ==
Wisconsin State Senate District 10 election 2000
Party	Candidate	Votes	%	±%
Republican	Sheila Harsdorf	41,694	50.0%	
Democratic	Alice Clausing (incumbent)	39,046	47.0%	
Independent	Jim Nelson	2,073	3	
Total votes		82,821	100.0%	
Republican gain from Democratic				

Wisconsin State Senate District 10 election 2004
Party	Candidate	Votes	%	±%
Republican	Sheila Harsdorf	56,704	59	
Democratic	Gary L. Bakke	39,001	41	
	Scattering	55		
Total votes		95,760	100.0%	
Republican hold				

Wisconsin State Senate District 10 election 2008
Party	Candidate	Votes	%	±%
Republican	Sheila Harsdorf	55,816	56.40%	
Democratic	Alison H. Page	43,041	43.49%	
	Scattering	110	.11%	
Total votes		98,967	100.0%	
Republican hold				

Wisconsin State Senate District 10 recall election 2011
Party	Candidate	Votes	%	±%
Republican	Sheila Harsdorf	37,099	58%	
Democratic	Shelly Moore	27,250	42%	

Wisconsin State Senate District 10 election 2012
Party	Candidate	Votes	%	±%
Republican	Sheila Harsdorf	51,911	59.2%	
Democratic	Daniel Olson	35,728	40.7%	
	Scattering	95	.11%	
Total votes		87,734	100.0%	
Republican hold				

Wisconsin State Senate District 10 election 2016
Party	Candidate	Votes	%	±%
Republican	Sheila Harsdorf	54,496	63.2	
Democratic	Diane Odeen	32,863	36.8	
Total votes		89,937	100.0%	
Republican hold				

Source: Wisconsin Bluebook

Wisconsin State Assembly
Preceded by William Berndt	Member of the Wisconsin State Assembly from the 30th district January 3, 1989 – January 4, 1999	Succeeded by Kitty Rhoades
Wisconsin Senate
Preceded by Alice Clausing	Member of the Wisconsin Senate from the 10th district January 8, 2001 – November 10, 2017	Succeeded by Patty Schachtner
Government offices
Preceded by Ben Brancel	Secretary of the Wisconsin Department of Agriculture, Trade and Consumer Protection; November 13, 2017 – January 7, 2019	Succeeded by Brad Pfaff
