= Jule Berndt =

American politician

Jule Berndt (April 18, 1924 – December 7, 1997) was an American Lutheran clergyman and politician.

Born in Oshkosh, Wisconsin, Berndt attended Winneconne High School, in Winneconne, Wisconsin, and then served in the United States Army Air Forces during World War II as a navigator. He received his bachelor's degree from the University of Wisconsin and his master's degree in theology from Wartburg Theological Seminary. He married Lois Kroeschel and had two children, Leah and Bill. Berndt was pastor of Lutheran Churches in Milwaukee, Sturgeon Bay, Eau Claire, and River Falls, Wisconsin. He served in the Wisconsin State Assembly in 1981 as a Republican, while living in River Falls, Wisconsin. He died in River Falls.
