= William Berndt =

American politician

William F. Berndt is a former member of the Wisconsin State Assembly and Wisconsin State Senate.

== Biography ==
Berndt was born on July 18, 1956 to Jule and Lois Berndt. He graduated from River Falls High School in River Falls, Wisconsin, class of 1974, before attending the University of Wisconsin–River Falls and the University of Minnesota. Berndt is married with a son and daughter. He owned a furniture manufacturing company.

== Career ==
Berndt served as a Republican in the Assembly, he was first elected in 1984 and was re-elected in 1986. He was elected to the Senate in a special election in 1989 and served until 1993.
