= 86th Wisconsin Legislature =

Wisconsin legislative term for 1983–1984

| ← | 85th | 87th | → |
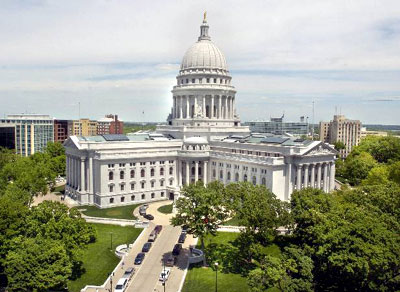
- Wisconsin State Capitol

Overview
- Legislative body: Wisconsin Legislature
- Meeting place: Wisconsin State Capitol
- Term: January 3, 1983 – January 7, 1985
- Election: November 2, 1982

Senate
- Members: 33
- Senate President: Fred Risser (D)
- President pro tempore: William A. Bablitch (D) ^{until July 31, 1983}
- Party control: Democratic

Assembly
- Members: 99
- Assembly Speaker: Thomas A. Loftus (D)
- Speaker pro tempore: David Clarenbach (D)
- Party control: Democratic

Sessions
- Regular: January 3, 1983 – January 7, 1985

Special sessions
- Jan. 1983 Spec.: January 4, 1983 – January 6, 1983
- Apr. 1983 Spec.: April 12, 1983 – April 14, 1983
- Jul. 1983 Spec.: July 11, 1983 – July 14, 1983
- Oct. 1983 Spec.: October 18, 1983 – October 28, 1983
- Feb. 1984 Spec.: February 2, 1984 – February 4, 1984
- May 1984 Spec.: May 22, 1984 – May 24, 1984

The Eighty-Sixth Wisconsin Legislature convened from January 3, 1983, to January 7, 1985, in regular session, and also convened in six special sessions.

This was the only legislative session under the legislative redistricting plan imposed by a panel of federal judges in 1982 in the case Wisconsin State AFL-CIO v. Elections Board. The district plan was intended to be punitive, scrambling the district numbers and putting incumbents in head-to-head contests. During this session, the legislature and governor agreed on a new redistricting plan to supersede the court plan, the only time this has been done in Wisconsin history.

Senators representing odd-numbered districts were newly elected for this session and were serving the first two years of a four-year term. Assembly members were elected to a two-year term. Assembly members and odd-numbered senators were elected in the general election of November 2, 1982. Senators representing even-numbered districts were serving the third and fourth year of a four-year term, having been elected in the general election of November 4, 1980.

The governor of Wisconsin during this entire term was Democrat Tony Earl, of Marathon County, serving the first two years of a four-year term, having won election in the 1982 Wisconsin gubernatorial election.

== Major events ==
- January 3, 1983: Inauguration of Tony Earl as the 41st Governor of Wisconsin.
- April 5, 1983: Wisconsin state senator William A. Bablitch was elected to the Wisconsin Supreme Court to succeed Bruce F. Beilfuss.
- April 18, 1983: A car bomb detonated in front of the U.S. embassy in Beirut, killing 63 people.
- August 1, 1983: Nathan Heffernan became the 23rd chief justice of the Wisconsin Supreme Court by rule of seniority, at the expiration of the term of chief justice Bruce F. Beilfuss.
- October 23, 1983: Simultaneous truck bombings in Beirut destroyed a United States Marine Corps barracks and a French Army barracks, killing 241 U.S. servicemen, 58 French paratroopers, and 6 Lebanese civilians.
- November 6, 1984: 1984 United States general election:
  - Ronald Reagan (R) re-elected President of the United States

== Major legislation ==
- July 19, 1983: An Act ... relating to redistricting the senate and assembly based on the 1980 federal census of population and making miscellaneous changes in the statutes pertaining to decennial legislative redistricting, 1983 Act 29.
- April 9, 1984: An Act ... relating to establishing a system of marital property shared by husband and wife and providing penalties, 1983 Act 186. Wisconsin's update to marital property laws to default to a shared property standard. Wisconsin was the first state to implement this change.

== Party summary ==
=== Senate summary ===
Senate partisan composition Democratic: 19 seats Republican: 14 seats

| | Party (Shading indicates majority caucus) | | Total | |
| | Dem. | Rep. | Total | Vacant |
|---|---|---|---|---|
| End of previous Legislature | 19 | 14 | 33 | 0 |
| Start of Reg. Session (Note: Democrat James T. Flynn (8th District) and Republican Clifford Krueger (12th District) resigned before the start of the session.) | 17 | 14 | 32 | 1 |
| From Apr. 13, 1983 (Note: Democrat Joseph Czarnezki (8th District) and Lloyd H. Kincaid (12th District) were sworn in to replace James T. Flynn and Clifford Krueger, respectively.) | 19 | 14 | 33 | 0 |
| From Jul. 31, 1983 (Note: Democrat William A. Bablitch (24th District) resigned after his election to the Wisconsin Supreme Court.) | 18 | 14 | 32 | 1 |
| From Aug. 12, 1983 (Note: Democrat David Helbach (24th District) was sworn in to replace William A. Bablitch.) | 19 | 14 | 33 | 0 |
| From Jan. 3, 1984 (Note: Democrat Paul Offner (32nd District) resigned.) | 18 | 14 | 32 | 1 |
| From Apr. 3, 1984 (Note: Democrat Jerry Kleczka (7th District) resigned after his election to the U.S. House of Representatives.) | 17 | 14 | 31 | 2 |
| From Apr. 23, 1984 (Note: Republican Brian Rude (32nd District) was sworn in to replace Paul Offner.) | 17 | 15 | 32 | 1 |
| From Nov. 13, 1984 (Note: Democrat John Plewa (7th District) was sworn in to replace Jerry Kleczka.) | 18 | 15 | 33 | 0 |
| Final voting share | 54.55% | 45.45% | | |
| Beginning of the next Legislature | 19 | 14 | 33 | 0 |

=== Assembly summary ===
Assembly partisan composition Democratic: 59 seats Republican: 40 seats

| | Party (Shading indicates majority caucus) | | Total | |
| | Dem. | Rep. | Total | Vacant |
|---|---|---|---|---|
| End of previous Legislature | 58 | 41 | 99 | 0 |
| Start of Reg. Session | 59 | 40 | 99 | 0 |
| From Apr. 13, 1983 (Note: Democrats Joseph Czarnezki (17th District) and Lloyd H. Kincaid (48th District) resigned after their election to the state senate.) | 57 | 40 | 97 | 2 |
| From Jul. 12, 1983 (Note: Democrats Peggy Krusick (17th District) and John Volk (48th District) were sworn in to replace Joseph Czarnezki and Lloyd H. Kincaid, respectively.) | 59 | 40 | 99 | 0 |
| From Aug. 12, 1983 (Note: Democrat David Helbach (58th District) resigned after his election to the state senate.) | 58 | 40 | 98 | 1 |
| From Nov. 11, 1983 (Note: Democrat William Horvath (58th District) was sworn in to replace David Helbach.) | 59 | 40 | 99 | 0 |
| From Nov. 30, 1983 (Note: Democrat Thomas W. Meaux (9th District) resigned after his election to the Milwaukee County board of supervisors.) | 58 | 40 | 98 | 1 |
| From Apr. 5, 1984 (Note: Democrat Thomas Barrett (9th District) was sworn in to replace Thomas W. Meaux.) | 59 | 40 | 99 | 0 |
| From Apr. 23, 1984 (Note: Republican Brian Rude (36th District) resigned after his election to the state senate.) | 59 | 39 | 98 | 1 |
| From Nov. 12, 1984 (Note: Democrat John Plewa (2nd District) resigned after his election to the state senate.) | 58 | 39 | 97 | 2 |
| Final voting share | 59.18% | 40.82% | | |
| Beginning of the next Legislature | 52 | 47 | 99 | 0 |

== Sessions ==
- Regular session: January 3, 1983 – January 7, 1985
- January 1983 special session: January 4, 1983 – January 6, 1983
- April 1983 special session: April 12, 1983 – April 14, 1983
- July 1983 special session: July 11, 1983 – July 14, 1983
- October 1983 special session: October 18, 1983 – October 28, 1983
- February 1984 special session: February 2, 1984 – February 4, 1984
- May 1984 special session: May 22, 1984 – May 24, 1984

== Leaders ==
=== Senate leadership ===
- President of the Senate: Fred Risser (D–Madison)
- President pro tempore: William A. Bablitch (D–Stevens Point) (until July 31, 1983)

==== Senate majority leadership ====
- Majority Leader: Timothy Cullen (D–Janesville)
- Assistant Majority Leader: Paul Offner (D–La Crosse) (until Jan. 3, 1984)
  - John Norquist (D–Milwaukee) (after Jan. 11, 1984)

==== Senate minority leadership ====
- Minority Leader: James Harsdorf (R–River Falls)
- Assistant Minority Leader: Susan Engeleiter (R–Menomonee Falls)

=== Assembly leadership ===
- Speaker of the Assembly: Thomas A. Loftus (D–Sun Prairie)
- Speaker pro tempore: David Clarenbach (D–Madison)

==== Assembly majority leadership ====
- Majority Leader: Gary K. Johnson (D–Beloit)
- Assistant Majority Leader: Richard Shoemaker (D–Menomonie)

==== Assembly minority leadership ====
- Minority Leader: Tommy Thompson (R–Elroy)
- Assistant Minority Leader: Robert S. Travis Jr. (R–Platteville)

== Members ==
=== Members of the Senate ===
Members of the Senate for the Eighty-Sixth Wisconsin Legislature:

Senate partisan representation Democratic: 19 seats Republican: 14 seats

| Dist. | Senator | Party | Age (1983) | Home | First elected |
|---|---|---|---|---|---|
| 01 | Alan Lasee | Rep. | 45 | De Pere, Brown County | 1977 |
| 02 | Don Hanaway | Rep. | 49 | De Pere, Brown County | 1979 |
| 03 | John Norquist | Dem. | 33 | Milwaukee, Milwaukee County | 1982 |
| 04 | Rod Johnston | Rep. | 45 | Whitefish Bay, Milwaukee County | 1979 |
| 05 | Mordecai Lee | Dem. | 34 | Milwaukee, Milwaukee County | 1982 |
| 06 | Gary George | Dem. | 28 | Milwaukee, Milwaukee County | 1980 |
| 07 | Jerry Kleczka (res. Apr. 3, 1984) | Dem. | 39 | Milwaukee, Milwaukee County | 1974 |
| 07 | John Plewa (from Nov. 13, 1984) | Dem. | 39 | Milwaukee, Milwaukee County | 1984 |
| 08 | --Vacant until Apr. 13, 1983-- | | | | |
| 08 | Joseph Czarnezki (from Apr. 13, 1983) | Dem. | 28 | Milwaukee, Milwaukee County | 1983 |
| 09 | Carl Otte | Dem. | 59 | Sheboygan, Sheboygan County | 1982 |
| 10 | James Harsdorf | Rep. | 32 | River Falls, Pierce County | 1980 |
| 11 | J. Mac Davis | Rep. | 30 | Waukesha, Waukesha County | 1976 |
| 12 | --Vacant until Apr. 13, 1983-- | | | | |
| 12 | Lloyd H. Kincaid (from Apr. 13, 1983) | Dem. | 57 | Crandon, Forest County | 1983 |
| 13 | Barbara Lorman | Rep. | 50 | Fort Atkinson, Jefferson County | 1980 |
| 14 | Gerald Lorge | Rep. | 60 | Bear Creek, Outagamie County | 1954 |
| 15 | Timothy Cullen | Dem. | 38 | Janesville, Rock County | 1974 |
| 16 | Carl W. Thompson | Dem. | 68 | Stoughton, Dane County | 1959 |
| 17 | Richard Kreul | Rep. | 58 | Fennimore, Grant County | 1978 |
| 18 | Scott McCallum | Rep. | 32 | Fond du Lac, Fond du Lac County | 1976 |
| 19 | Michael G. Ellis | Rep. | 41 | Neenah, Winnebago County | 1982 |
| 20 | David W. Opitz | Rep. | 37 | Port Washington, Ozaukee County | 1979 |
| 21 | Joseph A. Strohl | Dem. | 36 | Racine, Racine County | 1978 |
| 22 | John J. Maurer | Dem. | 60 | Kenosha, Kenosha County | 1975 |
| 23 | Marvin J. Roshell | Dem. | 50 | Lafayette, Chippewa County | 1978 |
| 24 | William A. Bablitch (res. Jul. 31, 1983) | Dem. | 41 | Stevens Point, Portage County | 1972 |
| 24 | David Helbach (after Aug. 12, 1983) | Dem. | 34 | Stevens Point, Portage County | 1983 |
| 25 | Daniel Theno | Rep. | 35 | Ashland, Ashland County | 1972 |
| 26 | Fred Risser | Dem. | 55 | Madison, Dane County | 1962 |
| 27 | Russ Feingold | Dem. | 29 | Middleton, Dane County | 1982 |
| 28 | Lynn Adelman | Dem. | 43 | New Berlin, Waukesha County | 1976 |
| 29 | Walter Chilsen | Rep. | 59 | Wausau, Marathon County | 1966 |
| 30 | Jerome Van Sistine | Dem. | 56 | Green Bay, Brown County | 1976 |
| 31 | Rodney C. Moen | Dem. | 45 | Whitehall, Trempealeau County | 1982 |
| 32 | Paul Offner (res. Jan. 3, 1984) | Dem. | 40 | La Crosse, La Crosse County | 1968 |
| 32 | Brian Rude (from Apr. 23, 1984) | Rep. | 28 | Coon Valley, Vernon County | 1984 |
| 33 | Susan Engeleiter | Rep. | 30 | Menomonee Falls, Waukesha County | 1980 |

=== Members of the Assembly ===
Members of the Assembly for the Eighty-Sixth Wisconsin Legislature:

Assembly partisan representation Democratic: 59 seats Republican: 40 seats

| Senate Dist. | Dist. | Representative | Party | Age (1983) | Home | First Elected |
|---|---|---|---|---|---|---|
| 01 | 73 | Lary J. Swoboda | Dem. | 43 | Luxemburg | 1970 |
| 01 | 74 | Dale Bolle | Dem. | 59 | Whitelaw | 1982 |
| 01 | 75 | Robert Cowles | Rep. | 32 | Green Bay | 1982 |
| 02 | 54 | Cathy Zeuske | Rep. | 24 | Shawano | 1982 |
| 02 | 82 | Gervase Hephner | Dem. | 46 | Chilton | 1966 |
| 02 | 83 | William J. Rogers | Dem. | 52 | Kaukauna | 1962 |
| 03 | 13 | Dismas Becker | Dem. | 46 | Milwaukee | 1977 |
| 03 | 14 | Thomas J. Crawford | Dem. | 30 | Milwaukee | 1980 |
| 03 | 15 | Walter Kunicki | Dem. | 24 | Milwaukee | 1980 |
| 04 | 04 | Barbara Ulichny | Dem. | 35 | Milwaukee | 1978 |
| 04 | 05 | Betty Jo Nelsen | Rep. | 47 | Shorewood | 1979 |
| 04 | 06 | Gus Menos | Dem. | 62 | Milwaukee | 1971 |
| 05 | 07 | Thomas Seery | Dem. | 37 | Milwaukee | 1982 |
| 05 | 08 | Lois Plous | Dem. | 44 | Milwaukee | 1980 |
| 05 | 09 | Thomas W. Meaux (res. Nov. 30, 1983) | Dem. | 28 | Milwaukee | 1982 |
| 05 | 09 | Thomas Barrett (from Apr. 5, 1984) | Dem. | 30 | Milwaukee | 1984 |
| 06 | 10 | Spencer Coggs | Dem. | 33 | Milwaukee | 1982 |
| 06 | 11 | Annette Polly Williams | Dem. | 45 | Milwaukee | 1980 |
| 06 | 12 | Marcia P. Coggs | Dem. | 54 | Milwaukee | 1976 |
| 07 | 01 | Louise M. Tesmer | Dem. | 40 | Milwaukee | 1972 |
| 07 | 02 | John Plewa (res. Nov. 13, 1984) | Dem. | 37 | Milwaukee | 1972 |
| 07 | 03 | Chester A. Gerlach | Dem. | 35 | South Milwaukee | 1974 |
| 08 | 16 | Jeannette Bell | Dem. | 41 | West Allis | 1982 |
| 08 | 17 | Joseph Czarnezki (res. Apr. 13, 1983) | Dem. | 28 | Milwaukee | 1980 |
| 08 | 17 | Peggy Krusick (from Jul. 12, 1983) | Dem. | 26 | Milwaukee | 1983 |
| 08 | 18 | Thomas A. Hauke | Dem. | 44 | West Allis | 1972 |
| 09 | 76 | Vernon W. Holschbach | Dem. | 56 | Manitowoc | 1980 |
| 09 | 77 | Calvin Potter | Dem. | 37 | Kohler | 1974 |
| 09 | 78 | Wilfrid J. Turba | Rep. | 54 | Elkhart Lake | 1982 |
| 10 | 40 | Earl Gilson | Dem. | 59 | River Falls | 1982 |
| 10 | 41 | Richard Shoemaker | Dem. | 31 | Menomonie | 1978 |
| 10 | 42 | Harvey Stower | Dem. | 38 | Amery | 1982 |
| 11 | 64 | Joseph Wimmer | Rep. | 48 | Waukesha | 1982 |
| 11 | 65 | Joanne Huelsman | Rep. | 44 | Waukesha | 1982 |
| 11 | 66 | Steven Foti | Rep. | 24 | Oconomowoc | 1982 |
| 12 | 46 | Jim Holperin | Dem. | 32 | Eagle River | 1982 |
| 12 | 48 | Lloyd H. Kincaid (res. Apr. 13, 1983) | Dem. | 57 | Crandon | 1972 |
| 12 | 48 | John Volk (from Jul. 12, 1983) | Dem. | 67 | Freedom | 1983 |
| 12 | 61 | Sheehan Donoghue | Rep. | 39 | Merrill | 1972 |
| 13 | 31 | Randall J. Radtke | Rep. | 31 | Lake Mills | 1978 |
| 13 | 32 | James M. Stewart | Rep. | 46 | Whitewater | 1982 |
| 13 | 33 | Robert Goetsch | Rep. | 49 | Oak Grove | 1982 |
| 14 | 85 | Francis R. Byers | Rep. | 62 | Marion | 1968 |
| 14 | 86 | Patricia A. Goodrich | Rep. | 49 | Berlin | 1974 |
| 14 | 87 | Tommy Thompson | Rep. | 41 | Elroy | 1966 |
| 15 | 25 | Gary K. Johnson | Dem. | 43 | Beloit | 1970 |
| 15 | 26 | Wayne W. Wood | Dem. | 52 | Janesville | 1976 |
| 15 | 27 | Charles W. Coleman | Rep. | 50 | Richmond | 1982 |
| 16 | 97 | Joe Wineke | Dem. | 25 | Verona | 1982 |
| 16 | 98 | Charles Chvala | Dem. | 28 | Madison | 1982 |
| 16 | 99 | Thomas A. Loftus | Dem. | 37 | Sun Prairie | 1976 |
| 17 | 37 | John T. Manske | Rep. | 30 | Milton | 1981 |
| 17 | 38 | Joseph E. Tregoning | Rep. | 41 | Shullsburg | 1967 |
| 17 | 39 | Robert S. Travis Jr. | Rep. | 35 | Platteville | 1976 |
| 18 | 88 | Esther Doughty Luckhardt | Rep. | 69 | Horicon | 1962 |
| 18 | 89 | Earl F. McEssy | Rep. | 69 | Fond du Lac | 1956 |
| 18 | 90 | Gordon R. Bradley | Rep. | 61 | Oshkosh | 1968 |
| 19 | 79 | David Prosser Jr. | Rep. | 40 | Appleton | 1978 |
| 19 | 80 | Esther K. Walling | Rep. | 42 | Menasha | 1982 |
| 19 | 81 | Carol A. Buettner | Rep. | 34 | Oshkosh | 1982 |
| 20 | 70 | John L. Merkt | Rep. | 36 | Mequon | 1976 |
| 20 | 71 | Donald K. Stitt | Rep. | 38 | Port Washington | 1979 |
| 20 | 72 | Mary Panzer | Rep. | 31 | West Bend | 1980 |
| 21 | 19 | Jeffrey A. Neubauer | Dem. | 27 | Racine | 1980 |
| 21 | 20 | James F. Rooney | Dem. | 47 | Racine | 1972 |
| 21 | 21 | Ronald A. Sell | Dem. | 37 | Caledonia | 1982 |
| 22 | 22 | Cloyd A. Porter | Rep. | 47 | Burlington | 1972 |
| 22 | 23 | John Antaramian | Dem. | 28 | Kenosha | 1982 |
| 22 | 24 | Joseph F. Andrea | Dem. | 55 | Kenosha | 1976 |
| 23 | 55 | Steven C. Brist | Dem. | 28 | Chippewa Falls | 1976 |
| 23 | 56 | Joseph Looby | Dem. | 65 | Eau Claire | 1968 |
| 23 | 57 | Heron Van Gorden | Rep. | 56 | Neillsville | 1982 |
| 24 | 58 | David Helbach (res. Aug. 12, 1983) | Dem. | 34 | Stevens Point | 1978 |
| 24 | 58 | William Horvath (from Nov. 11, 1983) | Dem. | 45 | Stevens Point | 1983 |
| 24 | 59 | Marlin Schneider | Dem. | 40 | Wisconsin Rapids | 1970 |
| 24 | 60 | Donald W. Hasenohrl | Dem. | 47 | Pittsville | 1974 |
| 25 | 49 | Robert Jauch | Dem. | 37 | Poplar | 1982 |
| 25 | 50 | June Jaronitzky | Rep. | 44 | Tripp | 1980 |
| 25 | 51 | Patricia Spafford Smith | Dem. | 57 | Rice Lake | 1978 |
| 26 | 94 | Mary Lou Munts | Dem. | 58 | Madison | 1972 |
| 26 | 95 | Midge Miller | Dem. | 60 | Madison | 1970 |
| 26 | 96 | David Clarenbach | Dem. | 29 | Madison | 1974 |
| 27 | 91 | Dale Schultz | Rep. | 29 | Washington | 1982 |
| 27 | 92 | Robert M. Thompson | Dem. | 55 | Poynette | 1970 |
| 27 | 93 | David Travis | Dem. | 34 | Madison | 1978 |
| 28 | 28 | James A. Rutkowski | Dem. | 40 | Hales Corners | 1970 |
| 28 | 29 | Raymond J. Moyer | Dem. | 56 | Rochester | 1982 |
| 28 | 30 | John C. Schober | Rep. | 31 | New Berlin | 1982 |
| 29 | 47 | Robert J. Larson | Rep. | 50 | Medford | 1978 |
| 29 | 62 | William A. Kasten | Rep. | 26 | Mosinee | 1982 |
| 29 | 63 | John H. Robinson | Dem. | 27 | Wausau | 1980 |
| 30 | 52 | Richard P. Matty | Rep. | 50 | Stephenson | 1972 |
| 30 | 53 | Cletus J. Vanderperren | Dem. | 70 | Pittsfield | 1958 |
| 30 | 84 | Sharon Metz | Dem. | 48 | Green Bay | 1974 |
| 31 | 43 | Barbara Gronemus | Dem. | 51 | Whitehall | 1982 |
| 31 | 44 | Mark D. Lewis | Dem. | 33 | Eau Claire | 1982 |
| 31 | 45 | Robert Quackenbush | Rep. | 59 | Sparta | 1970 |
| 32 | 34 | John Medinger | Dem. | 34 | La Crosse | 1976 |
| 32 | 35 | Virgil Roberts | Dem. | 60 | Holmen | 1970 |
| 32 | 36 | Brian Rude (res. Apr. 23, 1984) | Rep. | 27 | Coon Valley | 1982 |
| 32 | 36 | --Vacant from Apr. 23, 1984-- | | | | |
| 33 | 67 | Peggy Rosenzweig | Rep. | 46 | Wauwatosa | 1982 |
| 33 | 68 | John M. Young | Rep. | 56 | Brookfield | 1978 |
| 33 | 69 | Lolita Schneiders | Rep. | 51 | Menomonee Falls | 1980 |

== Employees ==
=== Senate employees ===
- Chief Clerk: Donald J. Schneider
- Sergeant-at-Arms: Daniel B. Fields

=== Assembly employees ===
- Chief Clerk: Joanne M. Duren
- Sergeant-at-Arms: Lewis T. Mittness

== Changes from the 85th Legislature ==
New districts for the 86th Legislature were defined in the case of Wisconsin State AFL-CIO v. Elections Board, decided by a three-judge panel of the United States District Court for the Eastern District of Wisconsin. This was the first time redistricting in Wisconsin was performed by a federal court.

=== Senate redistricting ===
==== Summary of Senate changes ====
- No districts were left unchanged
- Milwaukee County went from having 7 whole districts and part of two additional districts down to 6 whole districts (3, 4, 5, 6, 7, 8) and part of two additional districts (28, 33).

==== Senate districts ====
Map after redistricting, changes highlighted. Territory which was moved to a new district Districts which contain none of their prior territory

| Dist. | 85th Legislature | 86th Legislature |
|---|---|---|
| 1 | Door, Kewaunee, Manitowoc counties and parts of eastern Brown County | Door, Kewaunee counties and northern Manitowoc County and parts of eastern Brown County and eastern Calumet County |
| 2 | Calumet County and parts of central Brown County, southwest Outagamie County, eastern Fond du Lac County, northwest Sheboygan County, and northern Washington County | Most of Calumet County, eastern Outagamie County, eastern Shawano County, and parts of southern Brown County and southern Oconto County |
| 3 | Milwaukee County (city southwest) | Milwaukee County (city central) |
| 4 | Northeast Milwaukee County and most of Washington County and part of southern Ozaukee County | Milwaukee County (northeast) |
| 5 | Milwaukee County (northwest) | Milwaukee County (northwest) |
| 6 | Milwaukee County (city north) | Milwaukee County (city north) |
| 7 | Milwaukee County (southeast) | Milwaukee County (southeast) |
| 8 | Milwaukee County (middle-west) | Milwaukee County (middle-west) |
| 9 | Milwaukee County (city center) | Most of Sheboygan County and southern Manitowoc County and parts of southeast Calumet County and eastern Fond du Lac County |
| 10 | Buffalo, Burnett, Pepin, Pierce, Polk, St. Croix counties and western Barron County and part of southwest Trempealeau County | Burnett, Pierce, Polk, St. Croix counties and western Dunn County |
| 11 | Milwaukee County (city west) | Western Waukesha County and parts of southeast Washington County, southeast Jefferson County, and northwest Walworth County |
| 12 | Florence, Forest, Lincoln, Oneida, Rusk, Taylor, Vilas counties and parts of northeast Clark County, southern Price County, western Oconto County, northern Marinette County, and most of Langlade County | Florence, Forest, Langlade, Lincoln, Menominee, Oneida, Vilas and northern Marinette County, western Shawano County, and parts of northwest Oconto County, and northern Marathon County |
| 13 | Central and southern Jefferson County and eastern Dane County | Most of Jefferson County and most of Dodge County and part of northeast Rock County |
| 14 | Waupaca County and most of Outagamie County and parts of southern Shawano County | Adams, Green Lake, Juneau, Marquette, Waushara counties and eastern Waupaca County and western Outagamie County and parts of northwest Winnebago County and western Fond du Lac County |
| 15 | South and eastern Rock County and most of Walworth County and part of western Racine County | Central and southeast Rock County and most of Walworth County |
| 16 | Northern, western, and southern Dane County and northern Rock County | Most of Dane County and parts of northern Green County and northwest Rock County |
| 17 | Green, Iowa, Lafayette, Richland counties and most of Grant County and parts of northwest Dane County and western Rock County | Iowa, Lafayette counties and most of Grant County, most of Green County, and parts of southwest Richland County and western and northern Rock County |
| 18 | Most of Dodge County and parts of central Fond du Lac County and western Washington County | Most of Fond du Lac County, southern Winnebago County, and parts of western Washington County and eastern Dodge County |
| 19 | Most of Winnebago County and part of northern Fond du Lac County | Northeast Winnebago County and part of southern Outagamie County |
| 20 | Most of Sheboygan County and most of Ozaukee County | Most of Ozaukee County, eastern Washington County, and parts of southeast Sheboygan County |
| 21 | Racine County (eastern quarter) | Racine County (eastern half) |
| 22 | Kenosha County and parts of central Racine County and southeast Walworth County | Kenosha County and parts of southwest Racine County and southeast Walworth County |
| 23 | Chippewa and Dunn counties and parts of western Eau Claire County and eastern Pepin County | Chippewa and Clark counties and parts of eastern Dunn County, northern Eau Claire County, western Marathon County, southern Taylor County, and southeast Barron County |
| 24 | Green Lake and Portage counties and most of Waushara County and parts of northern Wood County, southern Marathon County, eastern Clark County, western Fond du Lac County, northwest Dodge County, and southwest Winnebago County | Portage and Wood counties and western Waupaca County |
| 25 | Ashland, Bayfield, Douglas, Iron, Sawyer, Washburn counties and eastern Barron County and northern Price County | Ashland, Bayfield, Douglas, Iron, Sawyer, Washburn counties and most of Barron County |
| 26 | Dane County (Madison) | Dane County (Madison) |
| 27 | Columbia, Marquette, Sauk counties and parts of southern Adams County, southern Juneau County, and western Dodge County | Columbia County, most of Sauk County, most of Richland County, and part of western Dodge County |
| 28 | Milwaukee (southwest) and most of Waukesha County and parts of eastern Jefferson County | Milwaukee (southwest) and parts of southeast Waukesha County, western Racine County, and northeast Walworth County |
| 29 | Menominee County and most of Marathon County and most of Shawano County and part of southern Langlade County | Price, Rusk counties and most of Marathon County and most of Taylor County |
| 30 | Brown (north & west) and eastern Oconto County and southern Marinette County | Northwest Brown County and eastern Oconto County and southern Marinette County |
| 31 | Most of Eau Claire County, most of Jackson County, most of Monroe County, and most of Clark County, and northern Trempealeau County | Buffalo, Jackson, Pepin, Trempealeau counties and most of Eau Claire County and most of Monroe County |
| 32 | Crawford, La Crosse, Vernon counties and parts of northwest Grant County, southwest Monroe County, southern Trempealeau County, and southeast Jackson County | Crawford, La Crosse, Vernon counties and parts of northern Grant County and western Monroe County |
| 33 | Waukesha County (northeast) | Northeast Waukesha County, parts of southern Washington County and western Milwaukee County |
