= 88th Wisconsin Legislature =

Wisconsin legislative term for 1987–1988

←	87th	89th	→
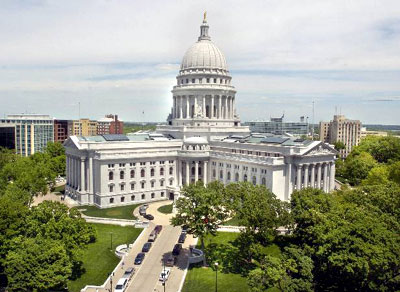
- Wisconsin State Capitol

Overview
- Legislative body: Wisconsin Legislature
- Meeting place: Wisconsin State Capitol
- Term: January 5, 1987 – January 2, 1989
- Election: November 4, 1986

Senate
- Members: 33
- Senate President: Fred Risser (D)
- Party control: Democratic

Assembly
- Members: 99
- Assembly Speaker: Thomas A. Loftus (D)
- Speaker pro tempore: David Clarenbach (D)
- Party control: Democratic

Sessions
- Regular: January 5, 1987 – January 3, 1989

Special sessions
- Sep. 1987 Spec.: September 15, 1987 – September 16, 1987
- Nov. 1987 Spec.: November 18, 1987 – June 7, 1988
- May 1988 Extra.: May 17, 1988 – June 16, 1988
- Jun. 1988 Spec.: June 30, 1988 – June 30, 1988
- Jun. 1988 Extra.: June 30, 1988 – July 20, 1988

The Eighty-Eighth Wisconsin Legislature convened from January 5, 1987, to January 3, 1989, in regular session, and also convened in three special sessions and two extraordinary sessions.

Senators representing odd-numbered districts were newly elected for this session and were serving the first two years of a four-year term. Assembly members were elected to a two-year term. Assembly members and odd-numbered senators were elected in the general election of November 4, 1986. Senators representing even-numbered districts were serving the third and fourth year of a four-year term, having been elected in the general election of November 6, 1984.

The governor of Wisconsin during this entire term was Republican Tommy Thompson, of Juneau County, serving the first two years of a four-year term, having won election in the 1986 Wisconsin gubernatorial election.

== Major events ==
- January 5, 1987: Inauguration of Tommy Thompson as the 42nd Governor of Wisconsin.
- February 27, 1987: The Tower Commission report was published, admonishing U.S. President Ronald Reagan for lax oversight of his National Security Council in the Iran–Contra affair.
- April 7, 1987: 1987 Wisconsin Spring election:
  - Wisconsin voters ratified two amendments to the state constitution:
    - Allowing pari-mutuel track betting.
    - Authorizing the creation of a state lottery.
- October 23, 1987: The United States Senate rejected the nomination of Robert Bork for a seat on the United States Supreme Court.
- November 8, 1988: 1988 United States general election:
  - George H. W. Bush (R) elected President of the United States.
  - Herb Kohl (D) elected United States senator from Wisconsin.

== Major legislation ==
- An Act ... relating to creating a state lottery, creating a lottery board, taxation of lottery winnings, ~~creating a lottery property tax credit,~~ granting rule-making authority, providing a penalty and making appropriations, 1987 Act 119. Established the Wisconsin Lottery. A property tax credit included in the original law was line-item vetoed.

== Party summary ==
=== Senate summary ===
Senate partisan composition Democratic: 19 seats Republican: 14 seats

	Party (Shading indicates majority caucus)		Total	
	Dem.	Rep.	Total	Vacant
End of previous Legislature	19	14	33	0
Start of Reg. Session (Note: Republicans Don Hanaway (2nd District) and Scott McCallum (18th District) and Democrat Timothy Cullen (15th District) resigned before the start of the session.)	19	11	30	3
From Apr. 21, 1987 (Note: Republicans Robert Cowles (2nd District), Carol Buettner (18th District), and Timothy Weeden (15th District) were sworn in to replace Don Hanaway, Scott McCallum, and Timothy Cullen, respectively.)	19	14	33	0
From Apr. 15, 1988 (Note: Democrat John Norquist (3rd District) resigned after his election as Mayor of Milwaukee.)	18	14	32	1
From Nov. 15, 1988 (Note: Democrat Brian Burke (3rd District) was sworn in to replace John Norquist.)	19	14	33	0
Final voting share	57.58%	42.42%		
Beginning of the next Legislature	20	13	33	0

=== Assembly summary ===
Assembly partisan composition Democratic: 55 seats Republican: 44 seats

	Party (Shading indicates majority caucus)		Total	
	Dem.	Rep.	Total	Vacant
End of previous Legislature	52	47	99	0
Start of Reg. Session	54	45	99	0
From Apr. 21, 1987 (Note: Republicans Robert Cowles (6th District), Timothy Weeden (45th District), and Carol Buettner (54th District) resigned due to their elections to the state senate.)	54	42	96	3
From Jun. 16, 1987 (Note: Republicans James R. Charneski (6th District) and Gregg Underheim (54th District) and Democrat Judy Robson (45th District) were sworn in to replace Robert Cowles, Carol Buettner, and Timothy Weeden, respectively.)	55	44	99	0
From Aug. 4, 1987 (Note: Republican Richard P. Matty (88th District) resigned.)	55	43	98	1
From Oct. 12, 1987 (Note: Republican John Gard (88th District) was sworn in to replace Richard P. Matty.)	55	44	99	0
From May 23, 1988 (Note: Democrat John H. Robinson (85th District) resigned due to election as mayor of Wausau.)	54	44	98	1
Final voting share	55.1%	44.9%		
Beginning of the next Legislature	56	43	99	0

== Sessions ==
- Regular session: January 5, 1987 – January 3, 1989
- September 1987 special session: September 15, 1987 – September 16, 1987
- November 1987 special session: November 18, 1987 – June 7, 1988
- May 1988 extraordinary session: May 17, 1988 – June 16, 1988
- June 1988 special session: June 30, 1988 – June 30, 1988
- June 1988 extraordinary session: June 30, 1988 – July 20, 1988

== Leaders ==
=== Senate leadership ===
- President of the Senate: Fred Risser (D–Madison)

==== Senate majority leadership ====
- Majority Leader: Joseph A. Strohl (D–Racine)
- Assistant Majority Leader: John Norquist (D–Milwaukee) (until Apr. 15, 1988)
  - Jerome Van Sistine (D–Green Bay) (after Apr. 18, 1988)

==== Senate minority leadership ====
- Minority Leader: Susan Engeleiter (R–Menomonee Falls)
- Assistant Minority Leader: Michael G. Ellis (R–Neenah)

=== Assembly leadership ===
- Speaker of the Assembly: Thomas A. Loftus (D–Sun Prairie)
- Speaker pro tempore: David Clarenbach (D–Madison)

==== Assembly majority leadership ====
- Majority Leader: Thomas A. Hauke (D–West Allis)
- Assistant Majority Leader: John Medinger (D–La Crosse)

==== Assembly minority leadership ====
- Minority Leader: Betty Jo Nelsen (R–Shorewood)
- Assistant Minority Leader: Joseph E. Tregoning (R–Shullsburg)

== Members ==
=== Members of the Senate ===
Members of the Senate for the Eighty-Eighth Wisconsin Legislature:

Senate partisan representation Democratic: 19 seats Republican: 14 seats

Dist.	Senator	Party	Age (1987)	Home	First elected
01	Alan Lasee	Rep.	49	Rockland, Brown County	1977
02	--Vacant until Apr. 21, 1987--				
02	Robert Cowles (from Apr. 21, 1987)	Rep.	36	Green Bay, Brown County	1987
03	John Norquist (res. Apr. 15, 1988)	Dem.	37	Milwaukee, Milwaukee County	1982
03	Brian Burke (from Nov. 15, 1988)	Dem.	30	Milwaukee, Milwaukee County	1988
04	Barbara Ulichny	Dem.	39	Milwaukee, Milwaukee County	1984
05	Mordecai Lee	Dem.	38	Milwaukee, Milwaukee County	1982
06	Gary George	Dem.	32	Milwaukee, Milwaukee County	1980
07	John Plewa	Dem.	41	Milwaukee, Milwaukee County	1984
08	Joseph Czarnezki	Dem.	32	Milwaukee, Milwaukee County	1983
09	William Te Winkle	Dem.	32	Wilson, Sheboygan County	1986
10	James Harsdorf	Rep.	36	River Falls, Pierce County	1980
11	J. Mac Davis	Rep.	34	Waukesha, Waukesha County	1976
12	Lloyd H. Kincaid	Dem.	61	Crandon, Forest County	1983
13	Barbara Lorman	Rep.	54	Fort Atkinson, Jefferson County	1980
14	Joseph Leean	Rep.	44	Dayton, Waupaca County	1984
15	--Vacant until Apr. 21, 1987--				
15	Timothy Weeden (from Apr. 21, 1987)	Rep.	35	Beloit, Rock County	1987
16	Charles Chvala	Dem.	32	Madison, Dane County	1984
17	Richard Kreul	Rep.	62	Fennimore, Grant County	1978
18	--Vacant until Apr. 21, 1987--				
18	Carol Buettner (from Apr. 21, 1987)	Rep.	39	Oshkosh, Winnebago County	1987
19	Michael G. Ellis	Rep.	45	Neenah, Winnebago County	1982
20	Donald K. Stitt	Rep.	42	Port Washington, Ozaukee County	1984
21	Joseph A. Strohl	Dem.	40	Racine, Racine County	1978
22	Joseph F. Andrea	Dem.	59	Kenosha, Kenosha County	1984
23	Marvin J. Roshell	Dem.	54	Lafayette, Chippewa County	1978
24	David Helbach	Dem.	38	Stevens Point, Portage County	1983
25	Robert Jauch	Dem.	41	Poplar, Douglas County	1986
26	Fred Risser	Dem.	59	Madison, Dane County	1962
27	Russ Feingold	Dem.	33	Middleton, Dane County	1982
28	Lynn Adelman	Dem.	47	New Berlin, Waukesha County	1976
29	Walter Chilsen	Rep.	63	Wausau, Marathon County	1966
30	Jerome Van Sistine	Dem.	60	Green Bay, Brown County	1976
31	Rodney C. Moen	Dem.	49	Whitehall, Trempealeau County	1982
32	Brian Rude	Rep.	31	Coon Valley, Vernon County	1984
33	Susan Engeleiter	Rep.	34	Brookfield, Waukesha County	1980

=== Members of the Assembly ===
Members of the Assembly for the Eighty-Eighth Wisconsin Legislature:

Assembly partisan representation Democratic: 55 seats Republican: 44 seats

Senate Dist.	Dist.	Representative	Party	Age (1987)	Home	First Elected
01	01	Lary J. Swoboda	Dem.	47	Luxemburg	1970
01	02	Dale Bolle	Dem.	63	Whitelaw	1982
01	03	Alvin Ott	Rep.	37	Brillion	1986
02	04	Cathy Zeuske	Rep.	28	Shawano	1982
02	05	Gary J. Schmidt	Rep.	39	Chilton	1984
02	06	Robert Cowles (res. Apr. 21, 1987)	Rep.	36	Green Bay	1982
02	06	James R. Charneski (from Jun. 16, 1987)	Rep.	51	Allouez	1987
03	07	Dismas Becker	Dem.	50	Milwaukee	1977
03	08	Peter Bock	Dem.	38	Milwaukee	1986
03	09	Walter Kunicki	Dem.	28	Milwaukee	1980
04	10	Betty Jo Nelsen	Rep.	51	Shorewood	1979
04	11	Louis Fortis	Dem.	39	Milwaukee	1986
04	12	Barbara Notestein	Dem.	37	Milwaukee	1984
05	13	Thomas Seery	Dem.	41	Milwaukee	1982
05	14	Thomas Barrett	Dem.	33	Milwaukee	1984
05	15	Shirley Krug	Dem.	28	Milwaukee	1984
06	16	Spencer Coggs	Dem.	37	Milwaukee	1982
06	17	Annette Polly Williams	Dem.	49	Milwaukee	1980
06	18	Marcia P. Coggs	Dem.	58	Milwaukee	1976
07	19	Louise M. Tesmer	Dem.	44	Milwaukee	1972
07	20	Tim Carpenter	Dem.	26	Milwaukee	1984
07	21	Richard Grobschmidt	Dem.	38	South Milwaukee	1984
08	22	Jeannette Bell	Dem.	45	West Allis	1982
08	23	Thomas A. Hauke	Dem.	48	West Allis	1972
08	24	Peggy Krusick	Dem.	30	Milwaukee	1983
09	25	Vernon W. Holschbach	Dem.	60	Manitowoc	1980
09	26	Calvin Potter	Dem.	41	Kohler	1974
09	27	Wilfrid J. Turba	Rep.	58	Elkhart Lake	1982
10	28	David E. Paulson	Rep.	55	Amery	1978
10	29	Richard Shoemaker	Dem.	35	Menomonie	1978
10	30	William Berndt	Rep.	30	River Falls	1984
11	31	Joanne Huelsman	Rep.	48	Waukesha	1982
11	32	Joseph Wimmer	Rep.	52	Waukesha	1982
11	33	Steven Foti	Rep.	28	Oconomowoc	1982
12	34	Jim Holperin	Dem.	36	Eagle River	1982
12	35	Thomas D. Ourada	Rep.	28	Antigo	1984
12	36	John Volk	Dem.	71	Freedom	1983
13	37	Randall J. Radtke	Rep.	35	Lake Mills	1978
13	38	Margaret S. Lewis	Rep.	32	Jefferson	1984
13	39	Robert Goetsch	Rep.	53	Oak Grove	1982
14	40	Francis R. Byers	Rep.	66	Marion	1968
14	41	Robert T. Welch	Rep.	28	Leon	1984
14	42	Ben Brancel	Rep.	36	Douglas	1986
15	43	Charles W. Coleman	Rep.	54	Richmond	1982
15	44	Wayne W. Wood	Dem.	56	Janesville	1976
15	45	Timothy Weeden (res. Apr. 21, 1987)	Rep.	35	Beloit	1984
15	45	Judy Robson (from Jun. 16, 1987)	Dem.	47	Beloit	1987
16	46	Thomas A. Loftus	Dem.	41	Sun Prairie	1976
16	47	David G. Deininger	Rep.	39	Monroe	1986
16	48	Sue Magnuson	Dem.	34	Madison	1984
17	49	David A. Brandemuehl	Rep.	55	Mount Ida	1986
17	50	Dale Schultz	Rep.	33	Washington	1982
17	51	Joseph E. Tregoning	Rep.	45	Shullsburg	1967
18	52	Earl F. McEssy	Rep.	73	Fond du Lac	1956
18	53	Mary Panzer	Rep.	35	West Bend	1980
18	54	Carol A. Buettner (res. Apr. 21, 1987)	Rep.	38	Oshkosh	1982
18	54	Gregg Underheim (from Jun. 16, 1987)	Rep.	36	Oshkosh	1987
19	55	Esther K. Walling	Rep.	46	Menasha	1982
19	56	Gordon R. Bradley	Rep.	65	Oshkosh	1968
19	57	David Prosser Jr.	Rep.	44	Appleton	1978
20	58	John L. Merkt	Rep.	40	Mequon	1976
20	59	Dwight A. York	Rep.	47	Lomira	1984
20	60	Susan B. Vergeront	Rep.	41	Cedarburg	1984
21	61	Scott C. Fergus	Dem.	31	Racine	1984
21	62	Jeffrey A. Neubauer	Dem.	31	Racine	1980
21	63	E. James Ladwig	Rep.	48	Caledonia	1978
22	64	Peter W. Barca	Dem.	31	Kenosha	1984
22	65	John Antaramian	Dem.	32	Kenosha	1982
22	66	Cloyd A. Porter	Rep.	51	Burlington	1972
23	67	Leo Richard Hamilton	Dem.	59	Chippewa Falls	1986
23	68	Joseph Looby	Dem.	69	Eau Claire	1968
23	69	Heron Van Gorden	Rep.	60	Neillsville	1982
24	70	Donald W. Hasenohrl	Dem.	51	Pittsville	1974
24	71	Stan Gruszynski	Dem.	37	Stevens Point	1984
24	72	Marlin Schneider	Dem.	44	Wisconsin Rapids	1970
25	73	Frank Boyle	Dem.	41	Summit	1986
25	74	Barbara Linton	Dem.	34	Ashland	1986
25	75	Mary Hubler	Dem.	34	Rice Lake	1984
26	76	Rebecca Young	Dem.	52	Madison	1984
26	77	Spencer Black	Dem.	36	Madison	1984
26	78	David Clarenbach	Dem.	33	Madison	1974
27	79	Joe Wineke	Dem.	29	Verona	1982
27	80	Robert M. Thompson	Dem.	59	Dekorra	1970
27	81	David Travis	Dem.	38	Madison	1978
28	82	James A. Rutkowski	Dem.	44	Hales Corners	1970
28	83	David J. Lepak	Rep.	27	Muskego	1984
28	84	John C. Schober	Rep.	35	New Berlin	1982
29	85	John H. Robinson (res. May 23, 1988)	Dem.	31	Wausau	1980
29	85	--Vacant from May 23, 1988--				
29	86	Brad Zweck	Dem.	28	Mosinee	1986
29	87	Robert J. Larson	Rep.	54	Medford	1978
30	88	Richard P. Matty (res. Aug. 4, 1987)	Rep.	54	Stephenson	1972
30	88	John Gard (from Oct. 12, 1987)	Rep.	24	Suamico	1987
30	89	Cletus J. Vanderperren	Dem.	74	Pittsfield	1958
30	90	Mary Lou E. Van Dreel	Dem.	51	Green Bay	1986
31	91	Barbara Gronemus	Dem.	55	Whitehall	1982
31	92	Terry Musser	Rep.	39	Irving	1984
31	93	Mark D. Lewis	Dem.	37	Eau Claire	1982
32	94	Virgil Roberts	Dem.	64	Holmen	1970
32	95	John Medinger	Dem.	38	La Crosse	1976
32	96	DuWayne Johnsrud	Rep.	43	Eastman	1984
33	97	Lolita Schneiders	Rep.	55	Menomonee Falls	1980
33	98	Peggy Rosenzweig	Rep.	50	Wauwatosa	1982
33	99	Margaret Farrow	Rep.	52	Elm Grove	1986

== Employees ==
=== Senate employees ===
- Chief Clerk: Donald J. Schneider
- Sergeant-at-Arms: Daniel B. Fields

=== Assembly employees ===
- Chief Clerk: Thomas T. Melvin
- Sergeant-at-Arms: Patrick Essie
