= 87th Wisconsin Legislature =

Wisconsin legislative term for 1985–1986

←	86th	88th	→
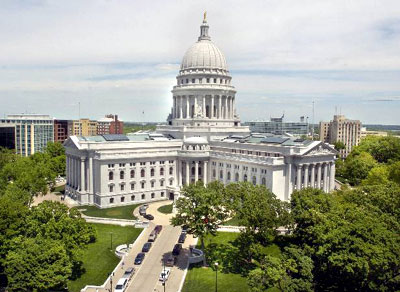
- Wisconsin State Capitol

Overview
- Legislative body: Wisconsin Legislature
- Meeting place: Wisconsin State Capitol
- Term: January 7, 1985 – January 5, 1987
- Election: November 6, 1984

Senate
- Members: 33
- Senate President: Fred Risser (D)
- Party control: Democratic

Assembly
- Members: 99
- Assembly Speaker: Thomas A. Loftus (D)
- Speaker pro tempore: David Clarenbach (D)
- Party control: Democratic

Sessions
- Regular: January 7, 1985 – January 5, 1987

Special sessions
- Mar. 1985 Spec.: March 19, 1985 – March 21, 1985
- Sep. 1985 Spec.: September 24, 1985 – October 19, 1985
- Oct. 1985 Spec.: October 31, 1985 – October 31, 1985
- Nov. 1985 Spec.: November 20, 1985 – November 20, 1985
- Jan. 1986 Spec.: January 27, 1986 – May 30, 1986
- Mar. 1986 Spec.: March 24, 1986 – March 26, 1986
- May 1986 Spec.: May 20, 1986 – May 29, 1986
- Jul. 1986 Spec.: July 15, 1986 – July 15, 1986

The Eighty-Seventh Wisconsin Legislature convened from January 7, 1985, to January 5, 1987, in regular session, and also convened in eight special sessions.

This was the first legislative session after the redistricting of the Senate and Assembly according to an act of the previous session.

Senators representing even-numbered districts were newly elected for this session and were serving the first two years of a four-year term. Assembly members were elected to a two-year term. Assembly members and even-numbered senators were elected in the general election of November 6, 1984. Senators representing odd-numbered districts were serving the third and fourth year of a four-year term, having been elected in the general election of November 2, 1982.

The governor of Wisconsin during this entire term was Democrat Tony Earl, of Marathon County, serving the second two years of a four-year term, having won election in the 1982 Wisconsin gubernatorial election.

== Major events ==
- January 20, 1985: Second inauguration of Ronald Reagan as President of the United States.
- March 1, 1985: Milwaukee businessman Herb Kohl reached a deal to purchase the Milwaukee Bucks professional basketball team, in order to prevent the team from leaving Milwaukee.
- September 6, 1985: Midwest Express Airlines Flight 105 crashed just after takeoff from Milwaukee Mitchell International Airport, killing all 31 people on board.
- January 28, 1986: The Space Shuttle Challenger exploded shortly after liftoff from Kennedy Space Center Launch Complex 39B, resulting in the death of all seven astronauts on board.
- April 1, 1986: 1986 Wisconsin Spring election:
  - Wisconsin voters ratified four amendments to the state constitution:
    - Rewording the section on inherent rights, to more directly mirror the language of the Declaration of Independence.
    - Repealing the old contents of Article III (suffrage), replacing it with a simplified statement of the right and circumstances where the legislature can modify that right. Also updated the voting age at 18.
    - Removing more obsolete language left in the constitution by the 1881 term-lengths amendments.
    - Removing obsolete reference to suffrage on Indian lands.
- November 4, 1986: 1986 United States general election:
  - Tommy Thompson (R) elected Governor of Wisconsin.
  - Bob Kasten (R) re-elected United States senator from Wisconsin.

== Major legislation ==
- July 18, 1985: An Act ... relating to creating the Bradley center sports and entertainment corporation and granting a property tax exemption, 1985 Act 26. Creating an entity to construct and manage the Bradley Center in Milwaukee.

== Party summary ==
=== Senate summary ===
Senate partisan composition Democratic: 19 seats Republican: 14 seats

	Party (Shading indicates majority caucus)		Total	
	Dem.	Rep.	Total	Vacant
End of previous Legislature	18	15	33	0
Start of Reg. Session	19	14	33	0
Final voting share	57.58%	42.42%		
Beginning of the next Legislature	18	12	30	3

=== Assembly summary ===
Assembly partisan composition Democratic: 52 seats Republican: 47 seats

	Party (Shading indicates majority caucus)		Total	
	Dem.	Rep.	Total	Vacant
End of previous Legislature	58	39	97	2
Start of Reg. Session	52	47	99	0
Final voting share	52.53%	47.47%		
Beginning of the next Legislature	54	45	99	0

== Sessions ==
- Regular session: January 7, 1985 – January 5, 1987
- March 1985 special session: March 19, 1985 – March 21, 1985
- September 1985 special session: September 24, 1985 – October 19, 1985
- October 1985 special session: October 31, 1985
- November 1985 special session: November 20, 1985
- January 1986 special session: January 27, 1986 – May 30, 1986
- March 1986 special session: March 24, 1986 – March 26, 1986
- May 1986 special session: May 20, 1986 – May 29, 1986
- July 1986 special session: July 15, 1986

== Leaders ==
=== Senate leadership ===
- President of the Senate: Fred Risser (D–Madison)

==== Senate majority leadership ====
- Majority Leader: Timothy Cullen (D–Janesville)
- Assistant Majority Leader: John Norquist (D–Milwaukee)

==== Senate minority leadership ====
- Minority Leader: Susan Engeleiter (R–Menomonee Falls)
- Assistant Minority Leader: Michael G. Ellis (R–Neenah)

=== Assembly leadership ===
- Speaker of the Assembly: Thomas A. Loftus (D–Sun Prairie)
- Speaker pro tempore: David Clarenbach (D–Madison)

==== Assembly majority leadership ====
- Majority Leader: Dismas Becker (D–Milwaukee)
- Assistant Majority Leader: John Medinger (D–La Crosse)

==== Assembly minority leadership ====
- Minority Leader: Tommy Thompson (R–Elroy)
- Assistant Minority Leader: Robert S. Travis Jr. (R–Platteville)

== Members ==
=== Members of the Senate ===
Members of the Senate for the Eighty-Seventh Wisconsin Legislature:

Senate partisan representation Democratic: 19 seats Republican: 14 seats

Dist.	Senator	Party	Age (1985)	Home	First elected
01	Alan Lasee	Rep.	47	Rockland, Brown County	1977
02	Don Hanaway	Rep.	51	De Pere, Brown County	1979
03	John Norquist	Dem.	35	Milwaukee, Milwaukee County	1982
04	Barbara Ulichny	Dem.	37	Milwaukee, Milwaukee County	1984
05	Mordecai Lee	Dem.	36	Milwaukee, Milwaukee County	1982
06	Gary George	Dem.	30	Milwaukee, Milwaukee County	1980
07	John Plewa	Dem.	39	Milwaukee, Milwaukee County	1984
08	Joseph Czarnezki	Dem.	30	Milwaukee, Milwaukee County	1983
09	Carl Otte	Dem.	61	Sheboygan, Sheboygan County	1982
10	James Harsdorf	Rep.	34	River Falls, Pierce County	1980
11	J. Mac Davis	Rep.	32	Waukesha, Waukesha County	1976
12	Lloyd H. Kincaid	Dem.	59	Crandon, Forest County	1983
13	Barbara Lorman	Rep.	52	Fort Atkinson, Jefferson County	1980
14	Joseph Leean	Rep.	42	Dayton, Waupaca County	1984
15	Timothy Cullen	Dem.	40	Janesville, Rock County	1974
16	Charles Chvala	Dem.	30	Madison, Dane County	1984
17	Richard Kreul	Rep.	60	Fennimore, Grant County	1978
18	Scott McCallum	Rep.	34	Fond du Lac, Fond du Lac County	1976
19	Michael G. Ellis	Rep.	43	Neenah, Winnebago County	1982
20	Donald K. Stitt	Rep.	40	Port Washington, Ozaukee County	1984
21	Joseph A. Strohl	Dem.	38	Racine, Racine County	1978
22	Joseph F. Andrea	Dem.	57	Kenosha, Kenosha County	1984
23	Marvin J. Roshell	Dem.	52	Lafayette, Chippewa County	1978
24	David Helbach	Dem.	36	Stevens Point, Portage County	1983
25	Daniel Theno	Rep.	37	Ashland, Ashland County	1972
26	Fred Risser	Dem.	57	Madison, Dane County	1962
27	Russ Feingold	Dem.	31	Middleton, Dane County	1982
28	Lynn Adelman	Dem.	45	New Berlin, Waukesha County	1976
29	Walter Chilsen	Rep.	61	Wausau, Marathon County	1966
30	Jerome Van Sistine	Dem.	58	Green Bay, Brown County	1976
31	Rodney C. Moen	Dem.	47	Whitehall, Trempealeau County	1982
32	Brian Rude	Rep.	29	Coon Valley, Vernon County	1984
33	Susan Engeleiter	Rep.	32	Menomonee Falls, Waukesha County	1980

=== Members of the Assembly ===
Members of the Assembly for the Eighty-Seventh Wisconsin Legislature:

Assembly partisan representation Democratic: 52 seats Republican: 47 seats

Senate Dist.	Dist.	Representative	Party	Age (1985)	Home	First Elected
01	01	Lary J. Swoboda	Dem.	45	Luxemburg	1970
01	02	Dale Bolle	Dem.	61	Whitelaw	1982
01	03	Gervase Hephner	Dem.	48	Chilton	1966
02	04	Cathy Zeuske	Rep.	26	Shawano	1982
02	05	Gary J. Schmidt	Rep.	37	Chilton	1984
02	06	Robert Cowles	Rep.	34	Green Bay	1982
03	07	Dismas Becker	Dem.	48	Milwaukee	1977
03	08	Thomas J. Crawford	Dem.	32	Milwaukee	1980
03	09	Walter Kunicki	Dem.	26	Milwaukee	1980
04	10	Betty Jo Nelsen	Rep.	49	Shorewood	1979
04	11	Gus Menos	Dem.	64	Milwaukee	1971
04	12	Barbara Notestein	Dem.	35	Milwaukee	1984
05	13	Thomas Seery	Dem.	39	Milwaukee	1982
05	14	Thomas Barrett	Dem.	31	Milwaukee	1984
05	15	Shirley Krug	Dem.	26	Milwaukee	1984
06	16	Spencer Coggs	Dem.	35	Milwaukee	1982
06	17	Annette Polly Williams	Dem.	47	Milwaukee	1980
06	18	Marcia P. Coggs	Dem.	56	Milwaukee	1976
07	19	Louise M. Tesmer	Dem.	42	Milwaukee	1972
07	20	Tim Carpenter	Dem.	24	Milwaukee	1984
07	21	Richard Grobschmidt	Dem.	36	South Milwaukee	1984
08	22	Jeannette Bell	Dem.	43	West Allis	1982
08	23	Thomas A. Hauke	Dem.	46	West Allis	1972
08	24	Peggy Krusick	Dem.	28	Milwaukee	1983
09	25	Vernon W. Holschbach	Dem.	58	Manitowoc	1980
09	26	Calvin Potter	Dem.	39	Kohler	1974
09	27	Wilfrid J. Turba	Rep.	56	Elkhart Lake	1982
10	28	David E. Paulson	Rep.	53	Amery	1978
10	29	Richard Shoemaker	Dem.	33	Menomonie	1978
10	30	William Berndt	Rep.	28	River Falls	1984
11	31	Joanne Huelsman	Rep.	46	Waukesha	1982
11	32	Joseph Wimmer	Rep.	50	Waukesha	1982
11	33	Steven Foti	Rep.	26	Oconomowoc	1982
12	34	Jim Holperin	Dem.	34	Eagle River	1982
12	35	Thomas D. Ourada	Rep.	26	Antigo	1984
12	36	John Volk	Dem.	69	Freedom	1983
13	37	Randall J. Radtke	Rep.	33	Lake Mills	1978
13	38	Margaret S. Lewis	Rep.	30	Jefferson	1984
13	39	Robert Goetsch	Rep.	51	Oak Grove	1982
14	40	Francis R. Byers	Rep.	64	Marion	1968
14	41	Robert T. Welch	Rep.	26	Leon	1984
14	42	Tommy Thompson	Rep.	43	Elroy	1966
15	43	Charles W. Coleman	Rep.	52	Richmond	1982
15	44	Wayne W. Wood	Dem.	54	Janesville	1976
15	45	Timothy Weeden	Rep.	33	Beloit	1984
16	46	Thomas A. Loftus	Dem.	39	Sun Prairie	1976
16	47	John T. Manske	Rep.	32	Milton	1981
16	48	Sue Magnuson	Dem.	32	Madison	1984
17	49	Robert S. Travis Jr.	Rep.	37	Platteville	1976
17	50	Dale Schultz	Rep.	31	Washington	1982
17	51	Joseph E. Tregoning	Rep.	43	Shullsburg	1967
18	52	Earl F. McEssy	Rep.	71	Fond du Lac	1956
18	53	Mary Panzer	Rep.	33	West Bend	1980
18	54	Carol A. Buettner	Rep.	36	Oshkosh	1982
19	55	Esther K. Walling	Rep.	44	Menasha	1982
19	56	Gordon R. Bradley	Rep.	63	Oshkosh	1968
19	57	David Prosser Jr.	Rep.	42	Appleton	1978
20	58	John L. Merkt	Rep.	38	Mequon	1976
20	59	Dwight A. York	Rep.	45	Lomira	1984
20	60	Susan B. Vergeront	Rep.	39	Grafton	1984
21	61	Scott C. Fergus	Dem.	29	Racine	1984
21	62	Jeffrey A. Neubauer	Dem.	29	Racine	1980
21	63	E. James Ladwig	Rep.	46	Caledonia	1978
22	64	Peter W. Barca	Dem.	29	Kenosha	1984
22	65	John Antaramian	Dem.	30	Kenosha	1982
22	66	Cloyd A. Porter	Rep.	49	Burlington	1972
23	67	Steven C. Brist	Dem.	30	Tainter	1976
23	68	Joseph Looby	Dem.	67	Eau Claire	1968
23	69	Heron Van Gorden	Rep.	58	Neillsville	1982
24	70	Donald W. Hasenohrl	Dem.	49	Pittsville	1974
24	71	Stan Gruszynski	Dem.	35	Stevens Point	1984
24	72	Marlin Schneider	Dem.	42	Wisconsin Rapids	1970
25	73	Robert Jauch	Dem.	39	Poplar	1982
25	74	William Plizka	Rep.	40	Morse	1984
25	75	Mary Hubler	Dem.	32	Rice Lake	1984
26	76	Rebecca Young	Dem.	50	Madison	1984
26	77	Spencer Black	Dem.	34	Madison	1984
26	78	David Clarenbach	Dem.	31	Madison	1974
27	79	Joe Wineke	Dem.	27	Verona	1982
27	80	Robert M. Thompson	Dem.	57	Dekorra	1970
27	81	David Travis	Dem.	36	Madison	1978
28	82	James A. Rutkowski	Dem.	42	Hales Corners	1970
28	83	David J. Lepak	Rep.	25	Muskego	1984
28	84	John C. Schober	Rep.	33	New Berlin	1982
29	85	John H. Robinson	Dem.	29	Wausau	1980
29	86	William A. Kasten	Rep.	28	Mosinee	1982
29	87	Robert J. Larson	Rep.	52	Medford	1978
30	88	Richard P. Matty	Rep.	52	Stephenson	1972
30	89	Cletus J. Vanderperren	Dem.	72	Pittsfield	1958
30	90	Sharon Metz	Dem.	50	Green Bay	1974
31	91	Barbara Gronemus	Dem.	53	Whitehall	1982
31	92	Terry Musser	Rep.	37	Irving	1984
31	93	Mark D. Lewis	Dem.	35	Eau Claire	1982
32	94	Sylvester G. Clements	Rep.	48	Coon Valley	1984
32	95	John Medinger	Dem.	36	La Crosse	1976
32	96	DuWayne Johnsrud	Rep.	41	Eastman	1984
33	97	Lolita Schneiders	Rep.	53	Menomonee Falls	1980
33	98	Peggy Rosenzweig	Rep.	48	Wauwatosa	1982
33	99	John M. Young	Rep.	58	Brookfield	1978

== Employees ==
=== Senate employees ===
- Chief Clerk: Donald J. Schneider
- Sergeant-at-Arms: Daniel B. Fields

=== Assembly employees ===
- Chief Clerk: Joanne M. Duren
- Sergeant-at-Arms: Patrick Essie

== Changes from the 86th Legislature ==
New districts for the 87th Legislature were defined in 1983 Wisconsin Act 29, passed into law in the 86th Wisconsin Legislature. This redistricting superseded the court-ordered plan imposed in the 1982 federal court case Wisconsin State AFL-CIO v. Elections Board.

=== Senate redistricting ===
==== Summary of Senate changes ====
- 8 districts were left unchanged.

==== Senate districts ====
Map after redistricting, changes highlighted. Territory which was moved to a new district Districts which were entirely unchanged

Dist.	86th Legislature	87th Legislature
01	Door, Kewaunee counties and northern Manitowoc County and parts of eastern Brown County and eastern Calumet County	Door, Kewaunee counties and most of Calumet County, northern Manitowoc County, and parts of northeast Fond du Lac County, southeast Outagamie County, and southern and eastern Brown County
02	Most of Calumet County, eastern Outagamie County, eastern Shawano County, and parts of southern Brown County and southern Oconto County	Most of eastern Outagamie County, most of eastern Shawano County, parts of central Oconto County and central Brown County
03	Milwaukee County (city central)	Milwaukee County (city central)
04	Milwaukee County (northeast)	Milwaukee County (northeast)
05	Milwaukee County (northwest)	Milwaukee County (northwest)
06	Milwaukee County (city north)	Milwaukee County (city north)
07	Milwaukee County (southeast)	Milwaukee County (southeast)
08	Milwaukee County (middle-west)	Milwaukee County (middle-west)
09	Most of Sheboygan County and southern Manitowoc County and parts of southeast Calumet County and eastern Fond du Lac County	Most of Sheboygan County and southern Manitowoc County and part of southeast Calumet County
10	Burnett, Pierce, Polk, St. Croix counties and western Dunn County	Burnett, Pierce, Polk, St. Croix counties and western Dunn County
11	Western Waukesha County and parts of southeast Washington County, southeast Jefferson County, and northwest Walworth County	Most of Waukesha County and parts of southern Washington County and eastern Jefferson County
12	Florence, Forest, Langlade, Lincoln, Menominee, Oneida, Vilas and northern Marinette County, western Shawano County, and parts of northwest Oconto County, and northern Marathon County	Florence, Forest, Langlade, Lincoln, Menominee, Oneida, Vilas and northern Marinette County, western Shawano County, and parts of northern Oconto County, and northern and eastern Marathon County
13	Most of Jefferson County and most of Dodge County and part of northeast Rock County	Most of Jefferson County and most of Dodge County and parts of northeast Rock County, northwest Walworth County, and southwestern Fond du Lac County
14	Adams, Green Lake, Juneau, Marquette, Waushara counties and eastern Waupaca County and western Outagamie County and parts of northwest Winnebago County and western Fond du Lac County	Green Lake, Marquette, Waushara counties, most of Juneau County, and most of Waupaca County and parts of western Outagamie County, western Fond du Lac County, western Winnebago County, southeast Monroe County, and southern and eastern Adams County
15	Central and southeast Rock County and most of Walworth County	Central and southeast Rock County and most of Walworth County
16	Most of Dane County and parts of northern Green County and northwest Rock County	Eastern Dane County, most of Green County, and parts of southeast Jefferson County and northern and western Rock County
17	Iowa, Lafayette counties and most of Grant County, most of Green County, and parts of southwest Richland County and western and northern Rock County	Iowa, Lafayette, Richland counties and most of Grant County, most of Sauk County, and parts of southeast Vernon County and southern Juneau County
18	Most of Fond du Lac County, southern Winnebago County, and parts of western Washington County and eastern Dodge County	Most of eastern Fond du Lac County and parts of southeast Winnebago County, southwest Sheboygan County, northwest Ozaukee County, and northeast Washington County
19	Northeast Winnebago County and part of southern Outagamie County	Most of Winnebago County and parts of southern Outagamie County and central Fond du Lac County
20	Most of Ozaukee County, eastern Washington County, and parts of southeast Sheboygan County	Most of Ozaukee County, most of Washington County, and parts of southeast Sheboygan County, eastern Dodge County, and southeast Fond du Lac County
21	Racine County (eastern half)	Racine County (eastern half)
22	Kenosha County and parts of southwest Racine County and southeast Walworth County	Kenosha County and parts of southwest Racine County and southeast Walworth County
23	Chippewa and Clark counties and parts of eastern Dunn County, northern Eau Claire County, western Marathon County, southern Taylor County, and southeast Barron County	Most of Chippewa County, most of Clark County, eastern Dunn county, most of western Taylor County, and parts of western Marathon County, northwest Eau Claire County, and southern Rusk County
24	Portage and Wood counties and western Waupaca County	Portage and Wood counties and most of northern Adams County and parts of western Waupaca County and southwest Marathon County
25	Ashland, Bayfield, Douglas, Iron, Sawyer, Washburn counties and most of Barron County	Ashland, Bayfield, Douglas, Iron, Sawyer, Washburn counties and most of Barron County and part of northeast Rusk County
26	Dane County (Madison)	Dane County (Madison)
27	Columbia County, most of Sauk County, most of Richland County, and part of western Dodge County	Most of Columbia County, western Dane County, and parts of northern Green County, northwest Rock County, western Dodge County, and northeast Sauk County
28	Milwaukee (southwest) and parts of southeast Waukesha County, western Racine County, and northeast Walworth County	Milwaukee (southwest) and parts of southeast Waukesha County, western Racine County, and northeast Walworth County
29	Price, Rusk counties and most of Marathon County and most of Taylor County	Price County and most of Rusk County, most of Marathon County, eastern Taylor County, and parts of western Shawano County, northwest Waupaca County, northern Chippewa County, and eastern Barron County
30	Northwest Brown County and eastern Oconto County and southern Marinette County	Northwest Brown County and southern Marinette County and parts of eastern Oconto County and eastern Shawano County
31	Buffalo, Jackson, Pepin, Trempealeau counties and most of Eau Claire County and most of Monroe County	Buffalo, Jackson, Pepin, Trempealeau counties and most of Eau Claire County, northern Monroe County, and part of western Clark County
32	Crawford, La Crosse, Vernon counties and parts of northern Grant County and western Monroe County	Crawford, La Crosse counties and most of Vernon County, and parts of northern Grant County and southwest Monroe County
33	Northeast Waukesha County, parts of southern Washington County and western Milwaukee County	Northeast Waukesha County and parts of western Milwaukee County

=== Assembly redistricting ===
==== Summary of Assembly changes ====
- 34 districts were left unchanged (but re-numbered).

==== Assembly districts ====
Map after redistricting, changes highlighted. (In this redistricting, the Assembly districts were entirely re-numbered, so the shading attempts to compare the new districts to their similarly-located analogue in the previous map.) Territory which was moved to a new district Districts which were entirely unchanged

86th Legislature			87th Legislature		
Asm. Dist.	Sen. Dist.	Description	Asm. Dist.	Sen. Dist.	Description
73	01	Door County, Kewaunee County, and part of northeast Brown County	01	01	Door County, Kewaunee County, and part of northeast Brown County
74	01	Most of Manitowoc County and parts of eastern Brown County and northeast Calumet County	02	01	Most of Manitowoc County and parts of eastern and southern Brown County
82	02	Most of Calumet County and parts of southern Outagamie County	03	01	Most of Calumet County and parts of southern Outagamie County, northeast Fond du Lac County, and southwest Brown County
54	02	Northeast Outagamie County, eastern Shawano County, and parts of central Oconto County	04	02	Northeast Outagamie County, most of eastern Shawano County, and parts of central Oconto County
83	02	Southwest Brown County and parts of eastern Outagamie County	05	02	Southeast Outagamie County and parts of southeast Brown County
75	01	Central Brown County	06	02	Central Brown County
13	03	Milwaukee County (city west)	07	03	Milwaukee County (city west)
15	03	Milwaukee County (city west)	08	03	Milwaukee County (city west)
14	03	Milwaukee County (city west)	09	03	Milwaukee County (city west)
05	04	Milwaukee County (northeast)	10	04	Milwaukee County (northeast)
06	04	Milwaukee County (north)	11	04	Milwaukee County (north)
04	04	Milwaukee County (east)	12	04	Milwaukee County (east)
07	05	Milwaukee County (northwest)	13	05	Milwaukee County (northwest)
09	05	Milwaukee County (city west)	14	05	Milwaukee County (city west)
08	05	Milwaukee County (city west)	15	05	Milwaukee County (city west)
10	06	Milwaukee County (city north)	16	06	Milwaukee County (city north)
11	06	Milwaukee County (city north)	17	06	Milwaukee County (city north)
12	06	Milwaukee County (city central)	18	06	Milwaukee County (city central)
01	07	Milwaukee County (city southeast)	19	07	Milwaukee County (city southeast)
02	07	Milwaukee County (city south)	20	07	Milwaukee County (city south)
03	07	Milwaukee County (southeast)	21	07	Milwaukee County (southeast)
16	08	Milwaukee County (West Allis eastern half)	22	08	Milwaukee County (West Allis eastern half)
18	08	Milwaukee County (Greenfield and western West Allis)	23	08	Milwaukee County (Greenfield and western West Allis)
17	08	Milwaukee County (city southwest)	24	08	Milwaukee County (city southwest)
76	09	Most of southern Manitowoc County and part of northeast Sheboygan County	25	09	Most of southern Manitowoc County
77	09	Part of eastern Sheboygan County	26	09	Part of eastern Sheboygan County
78	09	Most of Sheboygan County and parts of eastern Fond du Lac County and southeast Calumet County	27	09	Most of Sheboygan County and part of southeast Calumet County
42	10	Polk County, Burnett County, and part of northeast St. Croix County	28	10	Polk County, Burnett County, and part of northeast St. Croix County
41	10	Most of St. Croix County and western Dunn County	29	10	Most of St. Croix County and western Dunn County
40	10	Pierce County and part of southeast St. Croix County	30	10	Pierce County and part of southeast St. Croix County
65	11	Waukesha County (most of Waukesha and part of Pewaukee)	31	11	Waukesha County (Pewaukee, Delafield, part of Waukesha)
64	11	Southwest Waukesha County and parts of southeast Jefferson County and northeast Walworth County	32	11	Southwest Waukesha County and parts of eastern Jefferson County
66	11	Parts of northern and central Waukesha County and southern Washington County	33	11	Northwest Waukesha County and part of southern Washington County
46	12	Oneida County and Vilas County	34	12	Oneida County and Vilas County
61	12	Lincoln County, western Langlade County, and parts of northern Marathon County	35	12	Lincoln County, most of Langlade County, and parts of northern Marathon County
48	12	Florence County, Forest County, Menominee County, northern Marinette County, northern Oconto County, western Shawano County, and parts of northeast Marathon County	36	12	Florence County, Forest County, Menominee County, northern Marinette County, northern Oconto County, most of western Shawano County, and parts of eastern Marathon County
31	13	Most of Jefferson County and the part of Watertown in Dodge County	37	13	Parts of northern and western Jefferson County and the part of Watertown in Dodge County
32	13	Most of southern Jefferson County, parts of northeast Rock County, and the part of Whitewater in Walworth County	38	13	Central Jefferson County and parts of northeast Rock County and northwest Walworth County
33	13	Most of Dodge County and the part of Waupun in Fond du Lac County	39	13	Most of Dodge County and the part of Waupun in Fond du Lac County
85	14	Eastern Waupaca County, most of western Outagamie County, and parts of northwest Winnebago County	40	14	Eastern Waupaca County and parts of western Outagamie County
86	14	Green Lake County, most of Waushara County, and parts of western Fond du Lac County	41	14	Green Lake County, eastern Waushara County, and parts of western Winnebago County and western Fond du Lac County
87	14	Adams County, Juneau County, Marquette County, and part of northeast Waushara County	42	14	Marquette County, western Waushara County, most of Juneau County, eastern and southern Adams County, and parts of eastern Monroe County, northwest Columbia County, and northeast Sauk County
27	15	Most of Walworth County	43	15	Most of Walworth County
26	15	Southeast Rock County and most of Janesville	44	15	Parts of central and southeast Rock County, including most of Janesville
25	15	Parts of central and southern Rock County	45	15	Parts of southern Rock County
99	16	Eastern Dane County	46	16	Most of eastern Dane County
37	17	Most of Green County and parts of northern and western Rock County	47	16	Most of Green County and parts of southeast Jefferson County, and northern and western Rock County, and southeast Jefferson County
98	16	Dane County (eastern Madison and vicinity)	48	16	Dane County (eastern Madison and vicinity)
39	17	Most of Grant County and part of southwest Richland County	49	17	Most of Grant County and western Richland County
			50	17	Most of Sauk County, eastern Richland County, and part of southern Juneau County
38	17	Lafayette County, Iowa County, and parts of southeast Grant County	51	17	Lafayette County, Iowa County, and parts of southern Sauk County
89	18	Parts of central Fond du Lac County	52	18	Parts of central Fond du Lac County and southeast Winnebago County
72	20	Parts of central and eastern Washington County, and northwest Ozaukee County	53	18	Parts of eastern Fond du Lac County, northeast Washington County, northwest Ozaukee County, and southwest Sheboygan County
81	19	Parts of central Winnebago County	54	18	Winnebago County (most of Oshkosh)
80	19	Parts of northern Winnebago County (including Menasha and part of Neenah)	55	19	Winnebago County (Menasha and Neenah)
90	18	Most of southern Winnebago County and parts of central and western Fond du Lac County	56	19	Most of Winnebago County and parts of southern Outagamie County and central and western Fond du Lac County
79	19	Outagamie County (Appleton)	57	19	Outagamie County (Appleton)
70	20	Southwest Outagamie County and part of southeast Washington County	58	20	Parts of southern Outagamie County and central and southeast Washington County
88	18	Most of eastern Dodge County and parts of western Washington County	59	20	Most of eastern Dodge County, western Washington County, and part of southwest Sheboygan County
71	20	Most of Ozaukee County and southeast Sheboygan County	60	20	Most of Ozaukee County and parts of southeast Sheboygan County
20	21	Racine County (north city)	61	21	Racine County (north city)
19	21	Racine County (south city)	62	21	Racine County (south city)
21	21	Most of eastern Racine County	63	21	Most of eastern Racine County
24	22	Kenosha County (northeast)	64	22	Kenosha County (northeast)
23	22	Kenosha County (southeast)	65	22	Kenosha County (southeast)
22	22	Most of Kenosha County and parts of southwest Racine County and southeast Walworth County	66	22	Most of Kenosha County and parts of southwest Racine County and southeast Walworth County
55	23	Most of Chippewa County, eastern Dunn County, and parts of southeast Barron County	67	23	Most of Chippewa County, eastern Dunn County, and parts of southern Rusk County
56	23	Southeast Chippewa County and northern Eau Claire County	68	23	Southeast Chippewa County and parts of northwest Eau Claire County, southwest Taylor County, and northwest Clark County
57	23	Clark County and parts of western Marathon County and western and southern Taylor County	69	23	Most of Clark County and parts of western Marathon County and southern Taylor County
60	24	Most of Wood County and parts of northwest Portage County and the part of Marshfield in Marathon County	70	24	Most of Wood County and parts of northern and central Portage County and the part of Marshfield in Marathon County
58	24	Northern Portage County and northwest Waupaca County	71	24	Parts of central and eastern Portage County and parts of western Waupaca County
59	24	Southern Portage County and parts of southeast Wood County and southwest Waupaca County	72	24	Southeast Wood County, southwest Portage County, and most of Adams County
49	25	Douglas County and parts of western Bayfield County	73	25	Douglas County and parts of western Bayfield County
50	25	Ashland County, Iron County, Sawyer County, and most of Bayfield County	74	25	Ashland County, Iron County, Sawyer County, most of Bayfield County, and part of northern Rusk County
51	25	Washburn County and most of Barron County	75	25	Washburn County and most of Barron County
95	26	Dane County (southeast Madison)	76	26	Dane County (southern Madison)
94	26	Dane County (western Madison)	77	26	Dane County (northwest Madison)
96	26	Dane County (Madison isthmus)	78	26	Dane County (Madison isthmus)
97	16	Most of southern Dane County and parts of Northern Green County and northwest Rock County	79	27	Southwest Dane County and parts of northern Green County and northwest Rock County
92	27	Columbia County and parts of eastern Sauk County and western Dodge County	80	27	Most of Columbia County and parts of eastern Sauk County, western Dodge County, and northeast Dane County
93	27	Northwest Dane County	81	27	Northwest Dane County and part of southwest Columbia County
28	28	Milwaukee County (southwest)	82	28	Milwaukee County (southwest)
29	28	Most of western Racine County and parts of southeast Waukesha County and northeast Walworth County	83	28	Most of western Racine County and parts of southeast Waukesha County and northeast Walworth County
30	28	Waukesha County (New Berlin and part of Brookfield)	84	28	Waukesha County (New Berlin and part of Waukesha)
62	29	Most of western Marathon County	85	29	Part of northern Marathon County
63	29	Most of eastern Marathon County	86	29	Most of Marathon County
47	29	Price County, Rusk County, most of Taylor County, and part of eastern Barron County	87	29	Price County, most of Rusk County, most of eastern Taylor County, and parts of northern Chippewa County and eastern Barron County
52	30	Southern Marinette County and parts of eastern and central Oconto County	88	30	Southern Marinette County, most of eastern Oconto County, and parts of eastern Shawano County
53	30	Brown County (northwest)	89	30	Brown County (northwest)
84	30	Brown County (west)	90	30	Brown County (central)
43	31	Buffalo County, Pepin County, and Trempealeau County	91	31	Buffalo County, Pepin County, and Trempealeau County
45	31	Jackson County and most of Monroe County	92	31	Jackson County, most of Monroe County, and parts of western Clark County and northeast Eau Claire County
44	31	Most of Eau Claire County	93	31	Most of Eau Claire County
35	32	Most of La Crosse County and parts of western Monroe County	94	32	Most of La Crosse County and parts of southwest Monroe County
34	32	La Crosse County (city and vicinity)	95	32	Southwest La Crosse County
36	32	Crawford County, Vernon County, and parts of northern Grant county	96	32	Crawford County, most of Vernon County, and parts of northern Grant county
69	33	Parts of northeast Waukesha County and southern Washington County	97	33	Parts of northeast Waukesha County and northwest Milwaukee County
67	33	Milwaukee County (most of Wauwatosa)	98	33	Milwaukee County (most of Wauwatosa)
68	33	Waukesha County (eastern Brookfield) and parts of western Milwaukee County	99	33	Waukesha County (Brookfield) and part of western Milwaukee County
