= 1993 Wisconsin Supreme Court election =

- April 6, 1993
Candidate	William A. Bablitch
Popular vote	779,284
Percentage	unopposed
- County results Bablitch: >90%
Justice before election
William A. Bablitch
Elected Justice
William A. Bablitch

The 1993 Wisconsin Supreme Court election was held on April 6, 1993, to elect a justice to the Wisconsin Supreme Court for a ten-year term. Incumbent justice William A. Bablitch was re-elected, unopposed.

== Result ==
1993 Wisconsin Supreme Court election
Party	Candidate	Votes	%	±%
General election (April 6, 1993)
Nonpartisan	William A. Bablitch (incumbent)	779,284		
