= William A. Bablitch =

American politician (1941–2011)

- portrait photograph, as a justice

Justice of the Wisconsin Supreme Court
- In office August 1, 1983 – July 31, 2003
- Preceded by: Bruce F. Beilfuss
- Succeeded by: Patience D. Roggensack

President pro tempore of the Wisconsin Senate
- In office January 3, 1983 – July 31, 1983
- Preceded by: Vacant since 1979; Fred Risser (1979)
- Succeeded by: Vacant until 1993; Alan Lasee (1993)

Majority Leader of the Wisconsin Senate
- In office May 17, 1976 – May 26, 1982
- Preceded by: Wayne F. Whittow
- Succeeded by: Timothy Cullen

Member of the Wisconsin Senate from the 24th district
- In office January 1, 1973 – July 31, 1983
- Preceded by: Raymond F. Heinzen
- Succeeded by: David Helbach

District Attorney of Portage County, Wisconsin
- In office January 1, 1969 – January 1, 1973
- Preceded by: Wendel W. Crosby
- Succeeded by: Maris Rushevies

Personal details
- Born: William Albert Bablitch; March 1, 1941 Stevens Point, Wisconsin, U.S.
- Died: February 16, 2011 (aged 69) Kailua-Kona, Hawaii, U.S.
- Resting place: Forest Hill Cemetery
- Party: Democratic
- Spouses: Martha Jean Virtue (m. 1968; div. 1978); Ann Milne (m. 1986–2011)
- Children: 1
- Education: University of Wisconsin–Madison; University of Virginia
- Profession: Lawyer

William Albert Bablitch (March 1, 1941 – February 16, 2011) was an American lawyer, politician, and jurist from Stevens Point, Wisconsin. He served as a justice of the Wisconsin Supreme Court for 20 years, from 1983 to 2003. Earlier, he served nine years in the Wisconsin Senate, and was the Democratic majority leader from 1976 to 1982.

== Biography ==
portrait photograph, 1973

Bablitch was born in Stevens Point, Wisconsin, and graduated from Pacelli High School in 1959. He studied at the University of Wisconsin–Stevens Point and received a bachelor's degree from the University of Wisconsin–Madison in 1963. He served in the Peace Corps for two years before earning a law degree from the University of Wisconsin Law School in 1968.

Bablitch served as district attorney for Portage County from 1969 to 1972 and served in the Wisconsin State Senate from 1972 to 1983 and was a Democrat. He was elected to the Wisconsin Supreme Court in 1983 and reelected in 1993. While serving his first term on the Wisconsin Supreme Court, Bablitch earned a master of laws degree in the appellate process from the University of Virginia School of Law in 1987.

Bablitch retired at the end of his second ten-year term on July 31, 2003. He subsequently worked as a part-time advising partner at the law firm of Michael Best & Friedrich LLP in Madison, Wisconsin. In retirement, he spent his winters in Hawaii, and died there on February 16, 2011, after a long battle with cancer.

== Personal life and family ==
William Bablitch was one of four children born to Albert and Marguerite (née Mann) Bablitch. William's brother, Stephen E. Bablitch, was also a prominent Wisconsin attorney and became the first secretary of the Wisconsin Department of Corrections.

William Bablitch married Martha Jean Virtue on January 27, 1968, in Ypsilanti, Michigan. They met while both were attending the University of Wisconsin Law School. Martha, afterwards known as Martha Bablitch, went on to become a judge of the Wisconsin Court of Appeals. They had one daughter before divorcing in 1978. Bablitch subsequently remarried to Ann Milne.

Wisconsin Senate
Preceded by Raymond F. Heinzen	Member of the Wisconsin Senate from the 24th district January 1, 1973 – July 31, 1983	Succeeded by David Helbach
Preceded by Wayne F. Whittow	Majority Leader of the Wisconsin Senate; May 17, 1976 – May 26, 1982	Succeeded by Timothy Cullen
Preceded by Fred Risser (1979)	President pro tempore of the Wisconsin Senate; January 4, 1983 – July 31, 1983	Succeeded by Alan Lasee (1993)
Legal offices
Preceded by Wendel W. Crosby	District Attorney of Portage County, Wisconsin; January 1, 1969 – January 1, 1973	Succeeded by Maris Rushevies
Preceded by Bruce F. Beilfuss	Justice of the Wisconsin Supreme Court; August 1, 1983 – July 31, 2003	Succeeded by Patience D. Roggensack
