= Lloyd H. Kincaid =

American politician (1925–2007)

Lloyd Kincaid

Member of the Wisconsin Senate from the 12th district
- In office April 13, 1983 – July 12, 1990
- Preceded by: Clifford Krueger
- Succeeded by: Roger Breske

Member of the Wisconsin State Assembly
- In office January 3, 1983 – April 13, 1983
- Preceded by: Wayne W. Wood
- Succeeded by: John Volk
- Constituency: 48th District
- In office January 1, 1973 – January 3, 1983
- Preceded by: District created
- Succeeded by: Brian Rude
- Constituency: 36th District

Personal details
- Born: May 8, 1925 Sault Ste. Marie, Michigan, US
- Died: November 1, 2007 (aged 82) Crandon, Wisconsin, US
- Resting place: Crandon Lakeside Cemetery, Crandon, Wisconsin
- Party: Democratic; Republican (before 1977)
- Spouse: Kathleen
- Children: 4

Military service
- Allegiance: United States
- Branch/service: United States Army
- Years of service: 1943-1945
- Battles/wars: World War II

Lloyd Harvard Kincaid (May 8, 1925 – November 1, 2007) was an American carpenter, businessman, and politician from Forest County, Wisconsin. He served seven years as a member of the Wisconsin Senate (1983–1990) and ten years in the Wisconsin State Assembly (1973–1983). Originally elected as a Republican, he switched to the Democratic Party during the 1977 legislative session.

== Early life ==
Kincaid was born on May 8, 1925, in Sault Ste. Marie, Michigan. He graduated from high school in Crandon, Wisconsin. At age 18, 1943, he enlisted in the United States Army for service in World War II. After returning from the war, Kincaid worked as a cabinetmaker and grocer.

== Political career ==
From 1970 to 1973, he was a member of the Board of Directors of Nicolet Area Technical College, the city council of Crandon, Wisconsin, and a member of the Forest County Board of Supervisors.

In 1972, he was elected to his first term in the Wisconsin Legislature, when he was elected to represent the 36th district in the Wisconsin State Assembly. Though originally elected as a Republican, and re-elected twice on the Republican ticket, in the middle of his third term, Kincaid switched parties and became a conservative Democrat. He was disappointed with the way the Republican caucus had handled legislative negotiations over a change to the mining tax. After his party-switch, he was re-elected three more times, including his narrow 1982 victory over fellow-incumbent Earl W. Schmidt, with whom he had been forced into a confrontation due to redistricting.

Shortly after the 1982 election, on December 15, 1982, incumbent state senator Clifford Krueger announced he would retire at the end of the year. Kincaid won the April 1983 special election to fill the remainder of Krueger's term and was subsequently re-elected in 1984 and 1988.

Kincaid remained a member of the Senate until June 1990, when he resigned for health reasons.

== Personal life ==
Kincaid and his wife Kathleen were married for 55 years. They had three sons. and one daughter, from his first marriage to Shirley Krauter, who passed. and, at the time of his death, he had nine grandchildren and six great grandchildren. He was a member of the American Legion and active in his local church.

He died on November 1, 2007, at his home in Crandon, Wisconsin.

Wisconsin State Assembly
District created	Member of the Wisconsin State Assembly from the 36th district January 1, 1973 – January 3, 1983	Succeeded by Brian Rude
Preceded by Wayne W. Wood	Member of the Wisconsin State Assembly from the 48th district January 3, 1983 – April 13, 1983	Succeeded by John Volk
Wisconsin Senate
Preceded by Clifford Krueger	Member of the Wisconsin Senate from the 12th district April 13, 1983 – July 12, 1990	Succeeded by Roger Breske
