= Wisconsin's 36th Assembly district =

American legislative district in northeast Wisconsin

Wisconsin's 36th State Assembly district
- 2024 map defined in 2023 Wisc. Act 94; 2022 map defined in Johnson v. Wisconsin Elections Commission; 2011 map was defined in 2011 Wisc. Act 43
Assemblymember
| Jeffrey Mursau; R–Crivitz |
since January 3, 2005 (21 years)
- Demographics: 92.79% White; 0.59% Black; 1.74% Hispanic; 0.58% Asian; 3.54% Native American; 0.13% Hawaiian/Pacific Islander
- Population (2020) • Voting age: 60,015; 48,971
- Website: Official website
- Notes: Northeast Wisconsin

The 36th Assembly district of Wisconsin is one of 99 districts in the Wisconsin State Assembly. Located in northern Wisconsin, the district comprises all Florence, Forest, and Marinette counties, as well as most of the northern half of Oconto County. It includes the cities of Marinette, Crandon, Niagara, and Peshtigo, and the villages of Coleman, Crivitz, Pound, and Wausaukee. It also contains the Forest County Potawatomi Community and the Sokaogon Chippewa Community, and contains most of the Nicolet National Forest, including the Headwaters Wilderness. The district is represented by Republican Jeffrey Mursau, since January 2005.

The 36th Assembly district is located within Wisconsin's 12th Senate district, along with the 34th and 35th Assembly districts.

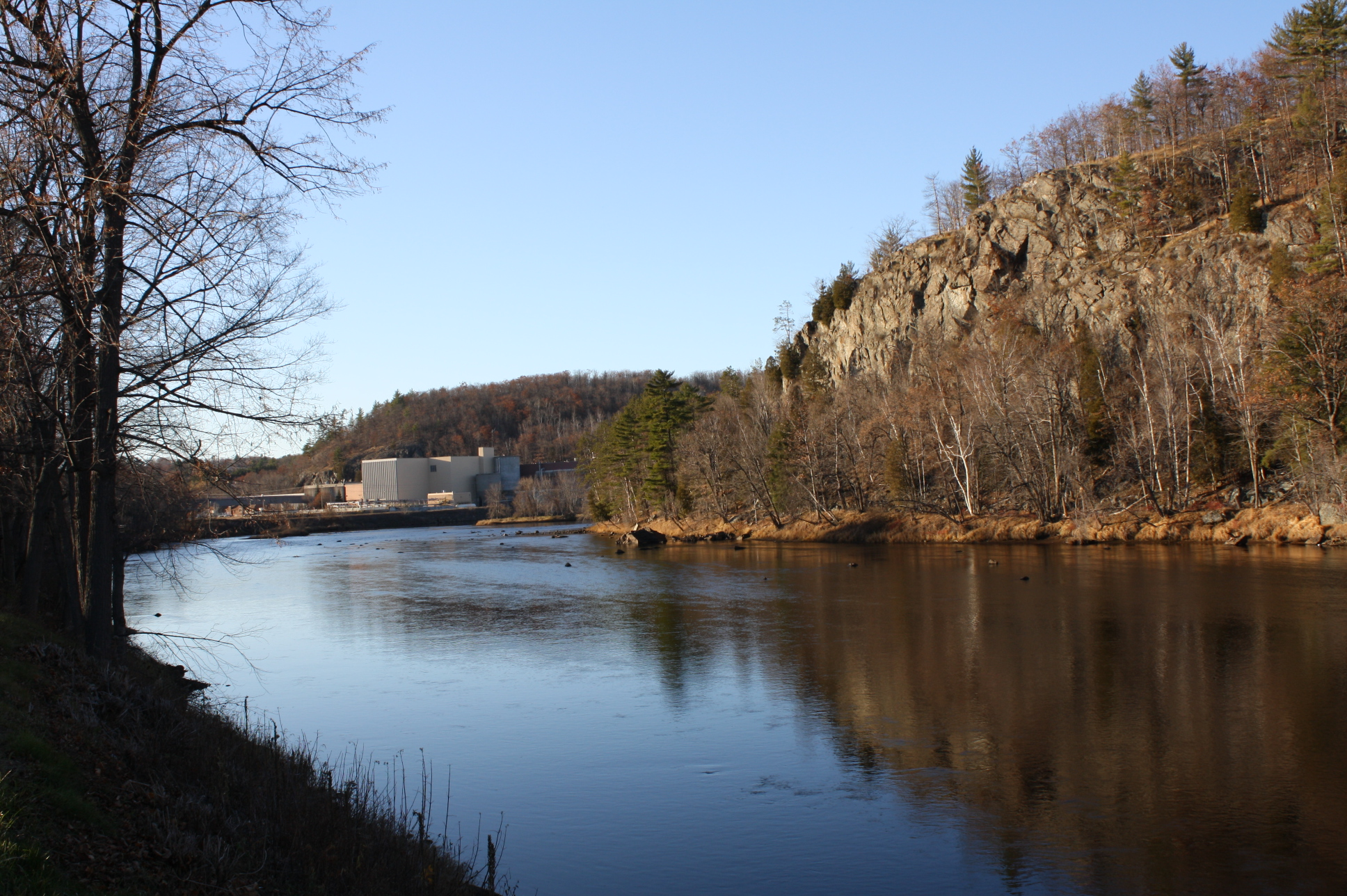
Menominee River viewed from Niagara

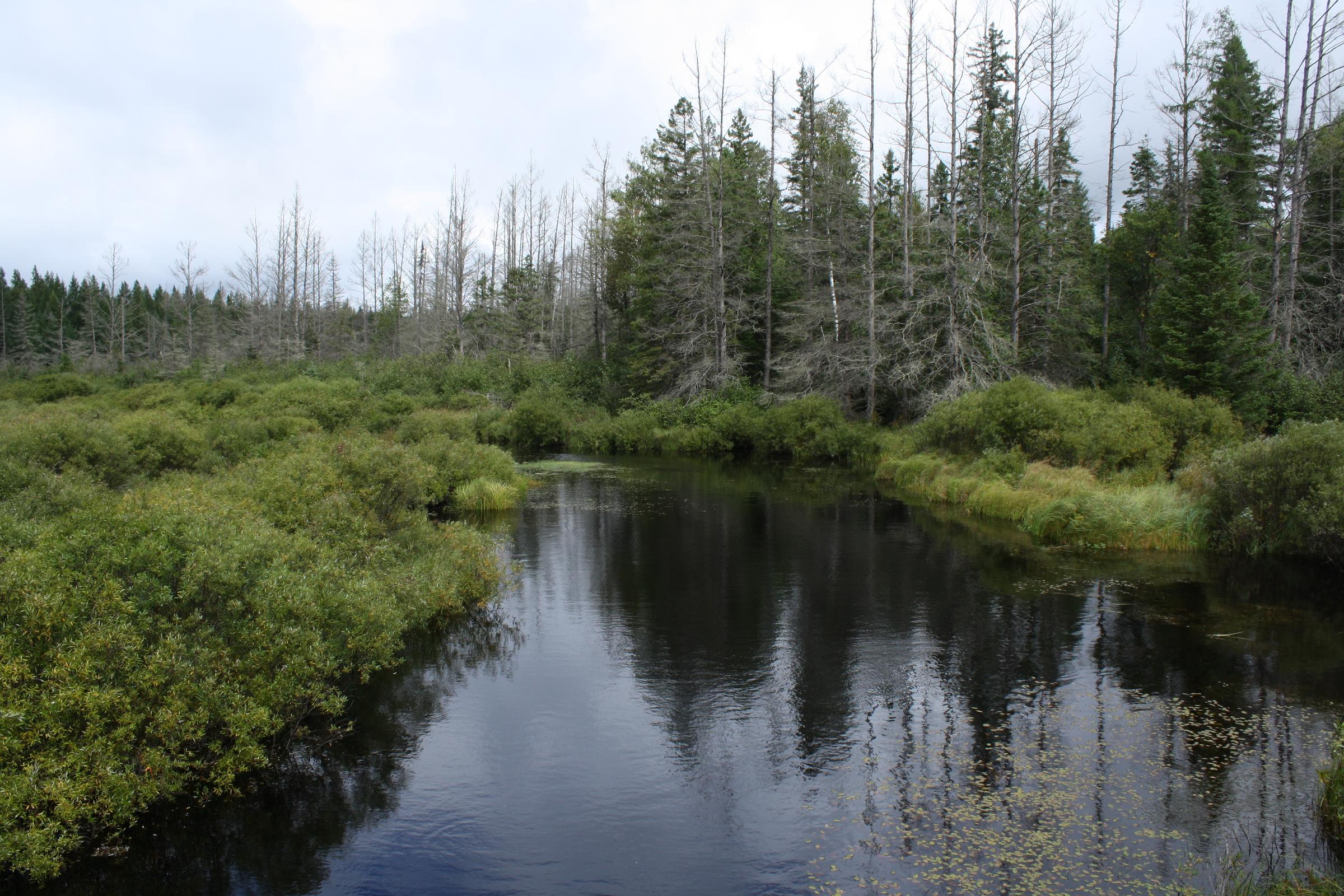
Headwaters Wilderness in the Nicolet National Forest

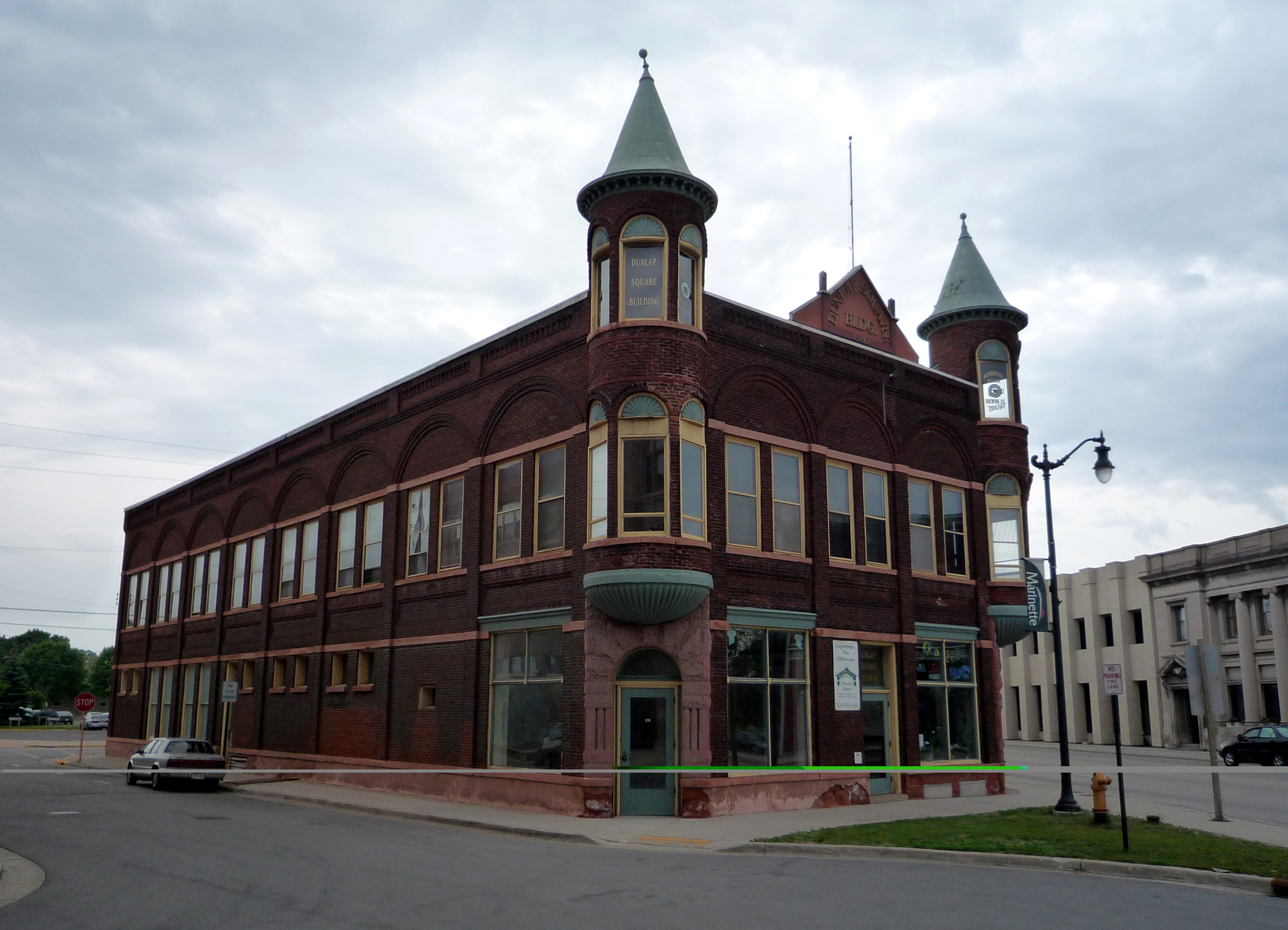
Dunlap Square Building in Marinette

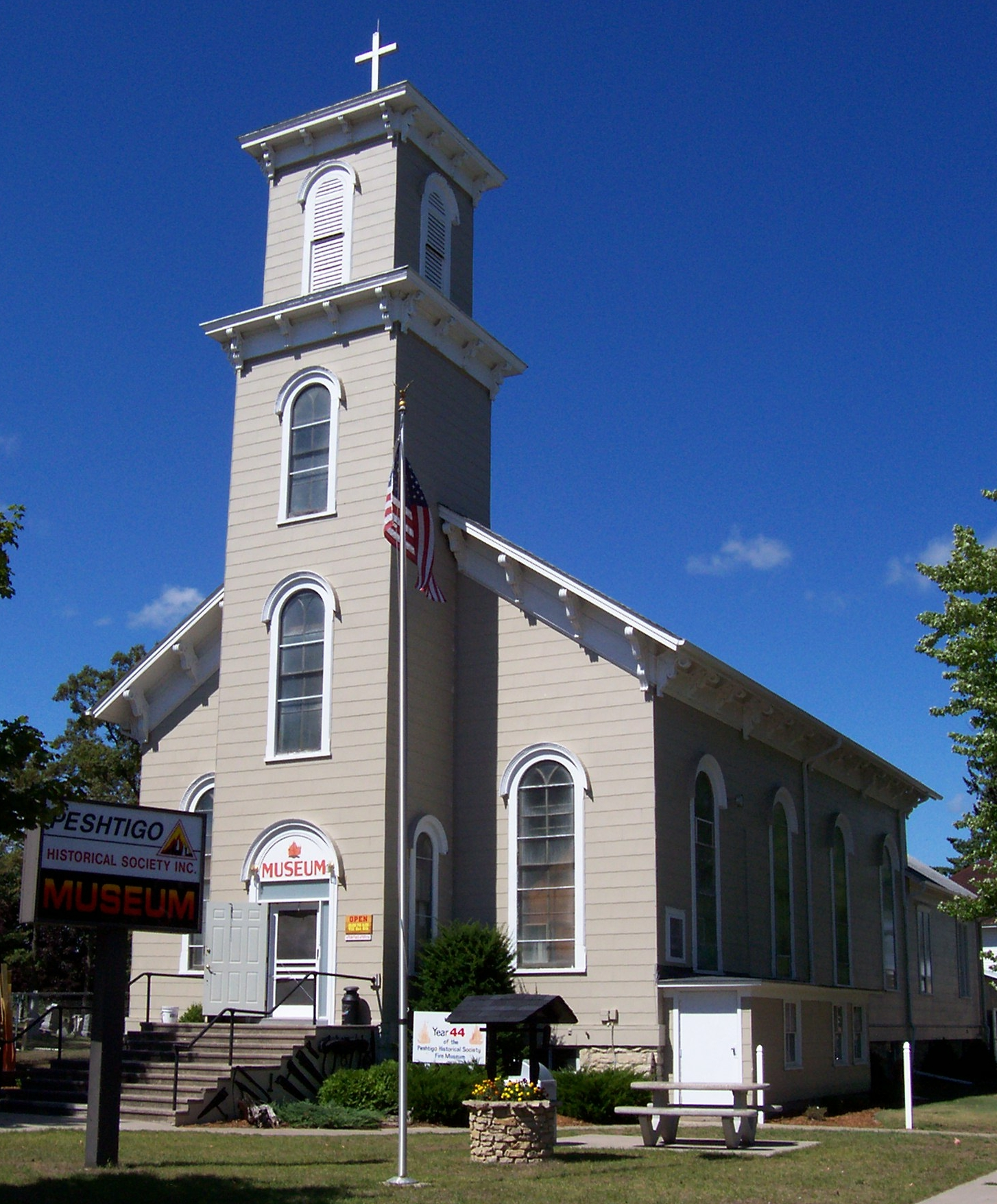
Peshtigo Fire Museum in Peshtigo

== List of past representatives ==
List of representatives to the Wisconsin State Assembly from the 36th district
| Member | Party | Residence | Counties represented | Term start | Term end | Ref. |
|---|---|---|---|---|---|---|
District created
| Lloyd H. Kincaid | Rep. | Crandon | Florence, Forest, Marinette, Oconto, Oneida, Vilas | January 1, 1973 | June 27, 1977 | |
| Lloyd H. Kincaid | Dem. | Crandon | Florence, Forest, Marinette, Oconto, Oneida, Vilas | June 27, 1977 | January 3, 1983 | |
| Brian Rude | Rep. | Coon Valley | Crawford, Grant, Vernon | January 3, 1983 | April 23, 1984 | |
| --Vacant-- | | | Crawford, Grant, Vernon | April 23, 1984 | January 7, 1985 | |
| John Volk | Dem. | Freedom | Florence, Forest, Langlade, Marathon, Marinette, Menominee, Oconto, Shawano | January 7, 1985 | January 7, 1991 | |
| Jerome T. Schwartz | Dem. | Armstrong Creek | Florence, Forest, Langlade, Marathon, Marinette, Menominee, Oconto, Shawano | January 7, 1991 | January 4, 1993 | |
| Lorraine Seratti | Rep. | Florence | Florence, Forest, Langlade, Marathon, Marinette, Menominee, Oconto, Shawano | January 4, 1993 | January 3, 2005 | |
| Jeffrey Mursau | Rep. | Wilson | Forest, Langlade, Marinette, Menominee, Oconto, Shawano | January 3, 2005 | Current | |
