= David Helbach =

American politician (born 1948)

Majority Leader of the Wisconsin Senate
- In office January 7, 1991 – April 20, 1993
- Preceded by: Joseph A. Strohl
- Succeeded by: Michael G. Ellis

Member of the Wisconsin Senate from the 24th district
- In office August 12, 1983 – February 17, 1995
- Preceded by: William A. Bablitch
- Succeeded by: Kevin Shibilski

Member of the Wisconsin State Assembly
- In office January 3, 1983 – August 12, 1983
- Preceded by: Carl Otte
- Succeeded by: William Horvath
- Constituency: 58th Assembly district
- In office January 1, 1979 – January 3, 1983
- Preceded by: Leonard A. Groshek
- Succeeded by: Donald K. Stitt
- Constituency: 71st Assembly district

Personal details
- Born: December 8, 1948 (age 77) Stevens Point, Wisconsin, U.S.
- Party: Democratic
- Spouses: Jean A. Glennon (m. 1971; div. 1988); Jennifer Jean Donnelly (m. 1990)
- Children: 2
- Education: University of Wisconsin–Stevens Point
- Occupation: Lobbyist, politician

David W. Helbach (born December 8, 1948) is a retired American lobbyist and Democratic politician from Stevens Point, Wisconsin. He served 12 years in the Wisconsin Senate (1983–1995), and was majority leader for the 1991–1992 term. He also served as administrator of the division of state facilities in the Wisconsin Department of Administration during the second term of governor Jim Doyle.

== Biography ==
Born in Stevens Point, Wisconsin, Helbach graduated from Pacelli High School and then received his bachelor's degree in communications from University of Wisconsin–Stevens Point in 1972. Helbach served in the Wisconsin State Assembly 1979-1983 and then was elected to the Wisconsin State Senate in a special election in 1983 serving until 1995.

Helbach was elected majority leader of the Senate for the 1991–1992 term; he was re-elected to continue as leader for the 1993 term, but Democrats lost their majority in April 1993 after losing two special elections. Helbach transitioned to minority leader, but quickly resigned from leadership. He remained in the Senate for two more years before resigning unexpectedly in February 1995.

After leaving the legislature, Helbach worked for several years as public affairs director for Alliant Energy and made his primary residence in Middleton, Wisconsin. He returned to public office in 2007, when Governor Jim Doyle appointed him administrator of the division of state facilities in the Wisconsin Department of Administration. He retired in 2010.

== Personal life and family ==
David Helbach married Jean A. Glennon on June 18, 1971, at St. Stephens Church in Stephens Point. They had two sons together before divorcing in 1988.

Helbach subsequently married Jennifer Jean Donnelly on December 8, 1990, in Madison, Wisconsin. Donnelly was also prominent in state government circles. She worked for many years as a top aide to Tim Cullen, through his time as Wisconsin Senate majority leader, then secretary of Health and Social Services, and then as an executive at Blue Cross & Blue Shield of Wisconsin. She later returned to government in the administration of Jim Doyle, as administrator of the division of administrative services in the Department of Administration, and then as director of the Office of State Employment Relations. They now primarily reside in Verona, Wisconsin.

Wisconsin State Assembly
Preceded by Leonard A. Groshek	Member of the Wisconsin State Assembly from the 71st district January 1, 1979 – January 3, 1983	Succeeded by Donald K. Stitt
Preceded by Carl Otte	Member of the Wisconsin State Assembly from the 58th district January 3, 1983 – August 12, 1983	Succeeded by William Horvath
Wisconsin Senate
Preceded by William A. Bablitch	Member of the Wisconsin Senate from the 24th district August 12, 1983 – February 17, 1995	Succeeded by Kevin Shibilski
Preceded by Joseph A. Strohl	Majority Leader of the Wisconsin Senate; January 7, 1991 – April 20, 1993	Succeeded by Michael G. Ellis
