= William Horvath =

American politician

William John Horvath (born March 23, 1938) was an American politician and conservationist.

Born in Shawano, Wisconsin, Horvath received his bachelor's degree in conservation from University of Wisconsin–Stevens Point and his master's degree from University of Michigan. He worked in conservation in Maryland and Pennsylvania before returning to Wisconsin to work for the Soil and Water Conservation Board. Horvath then worked for the National Association of Conservation Districts from 1972 until retiring in 2005. Horvath lived in Stevens Point, Wisconsin, served on the Stevens Point Common Council in 1975, and was president of the common council. From November 11, 1983 to the end of his term, Horvath served in the Wisconsin State Assembly having been elected in a special election. Horvath was a Democrat.
