= Timothy Cullen =

American politician (1944–2024)

Tim Cullen

5th Secretary of the Wisconsin Department of Health and Social Services
- In office January 5, 1987 – August 1988
- Appointed by: Tommy G. Thompson
- Preceded by: Linda Reivitz
- Succeeded by: Patricia A. Goodrich

Majority Leader of the Wisconsin Senate
- In office May 26, 1982 – January 5, 1987
- Preceded by: William A. Bablitch
- Succeeded by: Joseph A. Strohl

Member of the Wisconsin Senate from the 15th district
- In office January 3, 2011 – January 5, 2015
- Preceded by: Judy Robson
- Succeeded by: Janis Ringhand
- In office January 6, 1975 – January 5, 1987
- Preceded by: James D. Swan
- Succeeded by: Timothy Weeden

Personal details
- Born: February 25, 1944 Janesville, Wisconsin, U.S.
- Died: December 23, 2024 (aged 80) Madison, Wisconsin, U.S.
- Party: Democratic
- Spouses: Sally Marie MacKinnis (m. 1969, divorced); Barbara Mork (m. 1984)
- Children: 2 with Sally MacKinnis; 2 with Barbara Mork; 4 stepchildren
- Education: University of Wisconsin–Whitewater (B.S.)

Military service
- Allegiance: United States
- Branch/service: United States Army Reserve

Timothy Francis Cullen (February 25, 1944 – December 23, 2024) was an American Democratic politician from Janesville, Wisconsin. He was the Democratic majority leader of the Wisconsin Senate from 1982 to 1987, then served two years as secretary of the Wisconsin Department of Health and Social Services (1987–1988) in the administration of Republican governor Tommy Thompson. Cullen returned to the state Senate from 2011 to 2015, ultimately serving a total of 16 years representing Wisconsin's 15th Senate district.

After leaving public office, Cullen was chair of Common Cause Wisconsin, a nonpartisan good government advocacy organization, from 2016 to 2022. Earlier in his career, he served on the Janesville City Council and the board of the Janesville Public School District, and served as a district liaison on the staff of U.S. representative Les Aspin (WI–01).

== Early life and education ==
Tim Cullen was born, raised, and lived most of his life in Janesville, Wisconsin. He graduated from Janesville High School in 1962, and went on to attend the nearby University of Wisconsin–Whitewater (then known as Wisconsin State University–Whitewater), where he earned his bachelor's degree in 1966, majoring in political science. Cullen initially planned to pursue graduate school at the University of Kentucky, then briefly attended Northern Illinois University, but he ultimately returned to Janesville and began working as an agent for the Mutual Benefit Life Insurance Company in 1968.

== Early political career ==
Back in Janesville, Cullen began to participate in local politics in the tumultuous year 1968. After noticing "mixed" reaction to the assassination of Martin Luther King Jr., Cullen took it upon himself to organize his neighbors to collect donations and purchased a half-page ad in the Janesville Gazette memorializing King and expressing the community's grief.

In January 1969, Cullen, then 25, announced a run for Janesville City Council. Janesville city councilmembers are elected at-large, from an open field of candidates. In the 1969 election, four seats on the city council were up, voters therefore could vote for any four of the nine candidates running. The field included three incumbents seeking re-election, who secured three of the four seats. The fourth seat was won by attorney Robert Lovejoy who was making his second attempt at election; Cullen posted a surprisingly strong fifth place finish, however, falling just 58 votes short of the incumbent Edward Grumich.

Later that year, Cullen began teaching social studies at George S. Parker High School in Janesville. The following January, Cullen announced another run for City Council. This time eight candidates ran for three seats, with one incumbent seeking re-election. In the April 1970 election, Cullen topped the field, receiving 5,772 votes and securing one of the three City Council seats.

Cullen served less than a year on the City Council; he resigned his seat in early 1971 to accept a job on the staff of newly elected U.S. representative Les Aspin (D–Racine). Cullen served Aspin in a role now usually referred to as "district director"—at the time, Aspin called the role his district "ombudsman". Cullen was tasked with visiting the various parts of the 1st congressional district and handling constituent service requests. Aspin referred to Cullen's work as one of the most important tasks of his office. After initially planning to spend one day each week working in Kenosha, Racine, Beloit, Elkhorn, and his home Janesville, the program quickly expanded to visiting many additional smaller communities around the district.

== Wisconsin Senate (1975–1987) ==
Cullen served three years in that role for Aspin, traveling extensively around the district, earning significant local media coverage, and building a reputation for solving problems with government. He resigned his position in June 1974, announcing that he would run for Wisconsin Senate, challenging incumbent Republican James D. Swan in the 15th Senate district. At the time, the 15th Senate district comprised most of Walworth County, parts of western Racine County, and eastern and southeastern Rock County, including just one aldermanic district of the southeast side of the city of Janesville, where Cullen then resided. In announcing his campaign, Cullen pledged to continue the same constituent service activities in his new district. He attacked Swan as a far right extremist, outside of the mainstream of the Republican Party, and sought to tie Swan's past votes to the inflation crisis then plaguing the country. After a vigorous campaign, Cullen prevailed with 55% of the vote. He went on to win re-election with 59% of the vote in 1978.

In April 1982, in the midst of a major impasse between the Democratic legislature and the Republican governor over redistricting and the budget, the Democratic Senate majority leader, William A. Bablitch, announced he would step down that summer to begin planning a run for Wisconsin Supreme Court. Cullen, who had become a close ally of Bablitch, was already informed of his plans and had begun lining up support to succeed him. Within 10 days of Bablitch's announcement, the Democratic Senate caucus unanimously elected Cullen as his successor.

The change of leadership did not lead to a breakthrough on redistricting, however, and a panel of federal judges imposed a punitive remedial plan on the state in June 1982. Under the new plan, Cullen's district was somewhat altered: all of Janesville was added to his district, all of Racine County was removed. Cullen won two more elections in the new district, in 1982 and 1986, taking more than 60% of the vote in both elections.

During the 1985–1986 term, Cullen played an important role in the rise of Russ Feingold from the state Senate to the U.S. Senate. Feingold, then in his first term as a state senator, had derailed an interstate banking bill that could have led to Wisconsin-based banks being acquired by larger out-of-state financial institutions. The bill easily passed the Assembly and had the support of Democratic governor Tony Earl, but Feingold, as chair of the Senate committee on financial institutions, announced he would simply table the bill and would not allow it to go to the floor of the Senate. Cullen devised a plan to circumvent Feingold's committee just a week later; the interstate banking measure ultimately passed into law, but Feingold's stand earned him praise and notoriety from progressives and populists in the state.

== After the Senate ==
The 1986 election also saw the elevation of longtime Republican Assembly leader Tommy Thompson to the governor's mansion. Thompson, who had developed a personal friendship with Cullen, had promised to appoint prominent Democrats to his cabinet and offered Cullen the post of secretary of the Department of Transportation a few weeks after the election. Cullen, who was considering a run for governor in 1990, refused that offer, saying that he wasn't interested in a cabinet position. Less than a month later, however, Cullen shocked the Wisconsin political press by accepted appointment as secretary of the Department of Health and Social Services and ruling out a run for governor in 1990. In announcing the appointment, Thompson praised Cullen, saying he believed Cullen could devise a bipartisan welfare reform package. Cullen only remained in the role for 19 months, announcing in June 1988 that he would resign in August to accept a job as southwest Wisconsin regional vice-president for Blue Cross Blue Shield. At the time, Cullen noted that the private sector job would allow him more capacity to care for his infant son and aging mother.

During his tenure at Blue Cross Blue Shield of Wisconsin, the company merged with United Wisconsin Services, creating a new publicly traded parent company called Cobalt Corp., after which Cullen served as vice president in that parent company. Cobalt was, in turn, bought out by WellPoint Health Networks Incorporated in 2003, and Cullen became an executive at WellPoint, as senior vice president and chairman of government health services.

Cullen returned to elected office in 2007, when he was elected to the board of the Janesville Public School District.

In the early phase of the Great Recession, in June 2008, Governor Jim Doyle tasked Cullen to lead an effort along with local United Auto Workers president Brad Dutcher to find a way to save the Janesville Assembly Plant. Their goal was to devise an economic incentive package to convince General Motors to retool the plant, rather than shut it down. The recession became much more severe in the months after the announcement, and ultimately the Janesville plant shutdown occurred as scheduled.

== Wisconsin Senate (2011–2015) ==
In January 2010, state senator Judy Robson announced she would retire after representing the 15th Senate district for 12 years in the state Senate. Two months later, Cullen announced that he would run again to reclaim his former state Senate seat. By 2010, the district had shifted further to the west, comprising nearly all of Rock county and just the northwest corner of Walworth County. In the 2010 election, Democrats lost all statewide offices and lost control of both chambers of the Wisconsin Legislature; Cullen defeated his Republican opponent, however, taking 59% of the vote. The next four years were one of the most acrimonious periods in recent Wisconsin legislative history. Cullen announced in September 2013 that he would retire again from the state Senate. He cited the increased partisanship as a reason for his retirement.

=== 2011 Wisconsin protests ===
Shortly after the start of the 2011 legislative term, new governor Scott Walker revealed his controversial "Budget Repair" bill. The bill proposed stripping collective bargaining rights from public employees, prompting massive backlash from state labor unions and their Democratic allies. Thousands of protesters converged on the Wisconsin State Capitol, and remained for nearly four months voicing their complaints. Republicans in the Legislature were not moved by the demonstration, and rushed the bill through the legislative process. Democrats in the state Senate, desperate to slow down the process, decided to flee the state in order to deny a quorum to the Senate. Cullen fled with his Senate colleagues to Illinois, remaining for nearly a month. The entire affair received significant national media attention, and led to an incident where a journalist managed to trick Scott Walker in a phone conversation into believing he was speaking to billionaire Republican donor David Koch. During the conversation, Walker suggested that Cullen would be the only member of the Democratic senators he could approach, saying, "He's pretty reasonable, but he's not one of us."

Ultimately, the holdout ended in March when Republicans devised an amendment to the bill to strip out budget-related measures and therefore bypass the quorum requirement.

=== 2012 gubernatorial recall election ===
The backlash against Walker continued and grew after the legislature pushed through the budget repair bill, culminating in an effort to recall Governor Walker and several state senators. Cullen initially attempted to form a campaign to seek the Democratic nomination to challenge Walker in the recall election, but he withdrew before the primary, stating that he was unable to find sufficient funding to compete with other Democrats "who are far better known than I am, have access to financial resources above what I can raise, and have better statewide networks".

== Governor's race in 2018 ==
Cullen indicated that he would be ready to announce a campaign to unseat Wisconsin Governor Scott Walker sometime in April 2017. However, on March 29, he announced that he would not run, citing an inability to gain the necessary funds to run an effective campaign. In April 2018, Cullen was elected to serve as the Chair of the State Governing Board of Common Cause in Wisconsin, the state's largest non-partisan political reform advocacy organization. He stepped down as Chair in September 2022 but remained a board member.

== Personal life and family ==
Timothy Cullen married twice. His first wife was Sally Marie MacKinnis; they married on November 5, 1969, and had two children together before divorcing. Cullen subsequently married Barbara Mork on July 1, 1984. With his second wife, Cullen had another son and became stepfather to Mork's four children.

Cullen died after being hospitalized in Madison, Wisconsin, due to a heart condition, on December 23, 2024. He was 80.

== Electoral history ==
=== Wisconsin Senate (1974–1986) ===
| Year | Election | Date | Elected | | | | Defeated | | | | Total | Plurality |
|---|---|---|---|---|---|---|---|---|---|---|---|---|
| 1974 | General | Nov. 5 | Timothy F. Cullen | Democratic | 18,931 | 55.82% | James D. Swan (inc) | Rep. | 14,982 | 44.18% | 33,913 | 3,949 |
| 1978 | General | Nov. 7 | Timothy F. Cullen (inc) | Democratic | 22,759 | 59.01% | R. Casey Olson | Rep. | 15,809 | 40.99% | 38,568 | 6,950 |
| 1982 | General | Nov. 2 | Timothy F. Cullen (inc) | Democratic | 25,463 | 61.48% | Michael Clumpner | Rep. | 15,954 | 38.52% | 41,417 | 9,509 |
| 1986 | General | Nov. 4 | Timothy F. Cullen (inc) | Democratic | 23,755 | 63.43% | Michael Clumpner | Rep. | 13,696 | 36.57% | 37,451 | 10,059 |

=== Wisconsin Senate (2010) ===
| Year | Election | Date | Elected | | | | Defeated | | | | Total | Plurality |
|---|---|---|---|---|---|---|---|---|---|---|---|---|
| 2010 | General | Nov. 2 | Timothy F. Cullen | Democratic | 31,918 | 58.98% | Rick Richard | Rep. | 22,181 | 40.99% | 54,117 | 9,737 |

Wisconsin Senate
| Preceded by James D. Swan | Member of the Wisconsin Senate from the 15th district January 6, 1975 – January 5, 1987 | Succeeded by Timothy Weeden |
| Preceded by Judy Robson | Member of the Wisconsin Senate from the 15th district January 3, 2011 – January 5, 2015 | Succeeded by Janis Ringhand |
| Preceded by William A. Bablitch | Majority Leader of the Wisconsin Senate; January 1983 – January 1987 | Succeeded by Joseph A. Strohl |
Government offices
| Preceded by Linda Reivitz | Secretary of the Wisconsin Department of Health and Social Services; January 5, 1987 – August 1988 | Succeeded by Patricia A. Goodrich |
