= Gordon R. Bradley =

American politician

Gordon Bradley

Member of the Wisconsin State Assembly
- In office 1967–1988

Personal details
- Born: July 9, 1921 Utica, Wisconsin
- Died: January 18, 2011 (aged 90)
- Party: Republican
- Education: University of Wisconsin–Madison

Gordon R. "Bud" Bradley (July 9, 1921 – January 18, 2011) was an American politician and farmer who served as a member of the Wisconsin State Assembly.

== Biography ==
Bradley was born in Utica, Winnebago County, Wisconsin. He graduated from Omro High School in Omro, Wisconsin before participating in a one-year agriculture program at the University of Wisconsin–Madison.

Bradley was first elected to the Wisconsin State Assembly in 1968 and served until 1988. Additionally, he was Town Clerk and Town Supervisor of Oshkosh, Wisconsin from 1967 to 1971. He was a Republican.

He died on January 18, 2011.

Wisconsin State Assembly
Preceded by Floyd E. Shurbert	Member of the Wisconsin State Assembly from the 2nd Winnebago County district January 6, 1969–January 1, 1973	Constituency abolished
New constituency	Member of the Wisconsin State Assembly from the 57th district January 1, 1973–January 3, 1983	Succeeded by Heron Van Gorden
Preceded by Sharon Metz	Member of the Wisconsin State Assembly from the 90th district January 3, 1983–January 7, 1985	Succeeded by Sharon Metz
Preceded by Joseph Looby	Member of the Wisconsin State Assembly from the 56th district January 7, 1985–January 2, 1989	Succeeded by Judith Klusman
