= Brian Rude =

American politician and businessman

Brian D. Rude

President of the Wisconsin Senate
- In office April 21, 1998 – January 4, 1999
- Preceded by: Fred Risser
- Succeeded by: Fred Risser
- In office April 20, 1993 – July 9, 1996
- Preceded by: Fred Risser
- Succeeded by: Fred Risser

Member of the Wisconsin Senate from the 32nd district
- In office April 23, 1984 – May 25, 2000
- Preceded by: Paul Offner
- Succeeded by: Mark Meyer

Member of the Wisconsin State Assembly from the 36th district
- In office January 3, 1983 – April 23, 1984
- Preceded by: Lloyd H. Kincaid
- Succeeded by: John Volk

Personal details
- Born: August 25, 1955 (age 71) Viroqua, Wisconsin, U.S.
- Party: Republican
- Spouse: Karen Ann Thulin (m. 1981)
- Children: 2
- Education: Luther College (B.A.); University of Wisconsin–Madison (M.A.)
- Occupation: Politician, lobbyist

Brian David Rude (born August 25, 1955) is a retired American businessman, lobbyist, and Republican politician from Vernon County, Wisconsin. He was a member of the Wisconsin Senate for 16 years and served as president of the Senate for most of the 1993–1994 and 1995–1996 terms, and part of the 1997–1998 term. He also served a year in the Wisconsin State Assembly. After leaving government, he worked as a lobbyist for 20 years for Dairyland Power Cooperative.

== Early life and career ==
Brian Rude was born in Viroqua, Wisconsin, on August 25, 1955. He was raised in Westby, Wisconsin, and graduated from Westby High School in 1973. He went on to earn his bachelor's degree in history and political science from Luther College, in Iowa, in 1977. As a young man, he worked as a legislative aide and research analyst in the Iowa Senate and Wisconsin Senate. He began graduate school studies at the University of Wisconsin–Madison, but put his studies on hold in 1981, when he was employed in corporate communications for Trane. He ultimately remained at Trane until resigning to become a full-time legislator in 1985.

In these early years, he became involved in local affairs as chairman of the Kickapoo Valley Association—formed 20 years earlier to support a flood control project in the Kickapoo River valley, by the 1980s it was more for tourism advertisement. He was also active in the local Junior Chamber of Commerce.

== Political career ==
He first ran for public office in 1982, following the drastic 1982 court-ordered redistricting of the Wisconsin Legislature. He defeated two opponents in the Republican Party primary, and went on to win the general election with 57% of the vote.

A year after taking office, the incumbent state senator in his district, Paul Offner, announced he would resign with a year left in his term. In January 1984, Rude entered the special election contest to replace him in the Wisconsin Senate. He defeated county supervisor Douglas Farmer in the Republican primary and went on to face La Crosse state representative John Medinger in the general election. After the primary, Rude cast himself as an independent republican, and attempted to make the election a referendum on the performance of Governor Tony Earl. In a tight contest, Rude prevailed by just 698 votes, receiving 50.4% in the April special election. That fall, he won a full four-year term, defeating the other incumbent state representative in the district, Virgil Roberts, and increasing his vote share to 54%.

He went on to win three more four-year terms in the Senate, receiving more than 60% in each of those elections. In 1989, he moved into a leadership position in the Republican caucus when he was elected assistant minority leader in the Senate. He continued in that role until April 1993, when Republicans gained the majority and Rude was elected president of the Senate. He continued as president until Republicans lost the majority due to a 1996 recall election, but regained the office briefly in 1998 after another special election. Rude was considered a moderate Republican in the Senate and often played an important dealmaker role in the closely-divided state capital.

In the early 1990s, Rude completed his graduate studies at the University of Wisconsin–Madison, earning his M.A. He announced his retirement from the Legislature in 2000, leaving office in May, with seven months left in his term. At the time of his resignation, he received bipartisan accolades; Democratic U.S. representative Ron Kind referred to him as a role model.

== Later years ==
Immediately after leaving the Senate, Rude went to work as vice president of external relations for Dairyland Power Cooperative—an energy cooperative serving much of the Driftless Area of Wisconsin, Iowa, and Minnesota. He lobbied on behalf of the cooperative for the next 20 years, retiring in 2020. While working for Dairyland Power, he was also appointed to serve on the Wisconsin Agriculture, Trade & Consumer Protection Board by Governor Jim Doyle.

== Personal life and family ==
Brian Rude married Karen Ann Thulin, a registered nurse from Platteville, on October 24, 1981. They met while students at Luther College. They have two adult sons and still reside in Coon Valley, Wisconsin. Their son, Nels Rude, is a prolific lobbyist in Madison with the Kammer group.

Rude has also been active in many state and local community organizations in addition to his political activity. He has served as Chair of the Greater La Crosse Chamber of Commerce, Chair of the Board of Aptiv, and President of the Norwegian-American Historical Association. He was active for many years on the Wisconsin Historical Society's governing board of curators, and in 2016 was elected president of the board. Rude is currently chair of the Board of Trustees of Vesterheim Museum in Decorah, Iowa.

== Electoral history ==
=== Wisconsin Assembly (1982) ===
Wisconsin Assembly, 36th District Election, 1982
Party	Candidate	Votes	%	±%
Republican Primary, September 14, 1982
Republican	Brian D. Rude	2,818	50.04%	
Republican	Janet S. Schipper	2,477	43.99%	
Republican	Jeffrey D. Knickmeier	336	5.97%	
Plurality		341	6.06%	
Total votes		5,631	100.0%	
General Election, November 2, 1982
Republican	Brian D. Rude	9,993	57.62%	
Democratic	Henry Hendrickson	7,350	42.38%	
Plurality		2,643	15.24%	
Total votes		13,981	100.0%	
Republican gain from Democratic				

=== Wisconsin Senate (1984–1996) ===
Year	Election	Date	Elected				Defeated				Total	Plurality
1984 special	Special; Primary	Feb. 21	Brian D. Rude	Republican	6,807	64.97%	Douglas L. Farmer	Rep.	2,966	28.31%	6,442	1,294
1984 special	Special; Primary	Feb. 21	Brian D. Rude	Republican	6,807	64.97%	William T. Riley	Rep.	352	0.89%	6,442	1,294
1984 special	Special	Apr. 3	Brian D. Rude	Republican	20,037	50.44%	John Medinger	Dem.	19,339	48.68%	39,728	698
1984 special	Special	Apr. 3	Brian D. Rude	Republican	20,037	50.44%	Suzanne T. Kuring	Lib.	352	0.89%	39,728	698
1984	General	Nov. 6	Brian D. Rude (inc)	Republican	35,331	54.19%	Virgil Roberts	Dem.	29,866	45.81%	65,197	5,465
1988	General	Nov. 8	Brian D. Rude (inc)	Republican	45,384	72.20%	John Lindner	Dem.	17,471	27.80%	62,855	27,913
1992	General	Nov. 3	Brian D. Rude (inc)	Republican	46,778	63.89%	Diane Leslie Snyder	Dem.	26,440	36.11%	73,218	20,338
1996	General	Nov. 5	Brian D. Rude (inc)	Republican	49,357	75.10%	David Wulf	Dem.	16,364	24.90%	65,721	32,993

Wisconsin State Assembly
Preceded by Lloyd H. Kincaid	Member of the Wisconsin State Assembly from the 36th district January 3, 1983 – April 23, 1984	Succeeded by John Volk
Wisconsin Senate
Preceded by Paul Offner	Member of the Wisconsin Senate from the 32nd district April 23, 1984 – May 25, 2000	Succeeded by Mark Meyer
Preceded by Fred Risser	President of the Wisconsin Senate; April 20, 1993 – July 9, 1996	Succeeded by Fred Risser
Preceded by Fred Risser	President of the Wisconsin Senate; April 21, 1998 – January 4, 1999	Succeeded by Fred Risser
