= Robert Thompson (Wisconsin politician) =

American politician (1927–1999)

Robert M. Thompson (November 25, 1927 – June 1, 1999) was a member of the Wisconsin State Assembly.

== Biography ==
Thompson was born in Madison, Wisconsin. He graduated from Poynette High School in Poynette, Wisconsin. Later, he joined the United States Marshals Service. As a U.S. marshal, Thompson was in charge of law enforcement at Fort McCoy, Wisconsin in 1980, when it was used as an internment camp for Cuban refugees admitted as part of the Mariel boatlift.

Thompson was married with one child. He died on June 1, 1999 after suffering a heart attack while watching a softball game.

== Political career ==
Thompson was first elected to the Assembly in 1970 as a Democrat. After serving as Sergeant at Arms of the Wisconsin State Senate from 1975 to 1978, Thompson was again elected to the Assembly in 1982. Additionally, he became Chairman of Dekorra, Wisconsin in 1981 and a member of the Columbia County, Wisconsin Board in 1982. In 1990, Thompson ran for Secretary of State of Wisconsin as a Republican, losing to incumbent Doug La Follette.

Party political offices
Preceded by Clifford Krueger	Republican nominee for Secretary of State of Wisconsin; 1990	Succeeded by Erling G. Jackson
