= River Falls (town), Wisconsin =

River Falls, Wisconsin
- Town
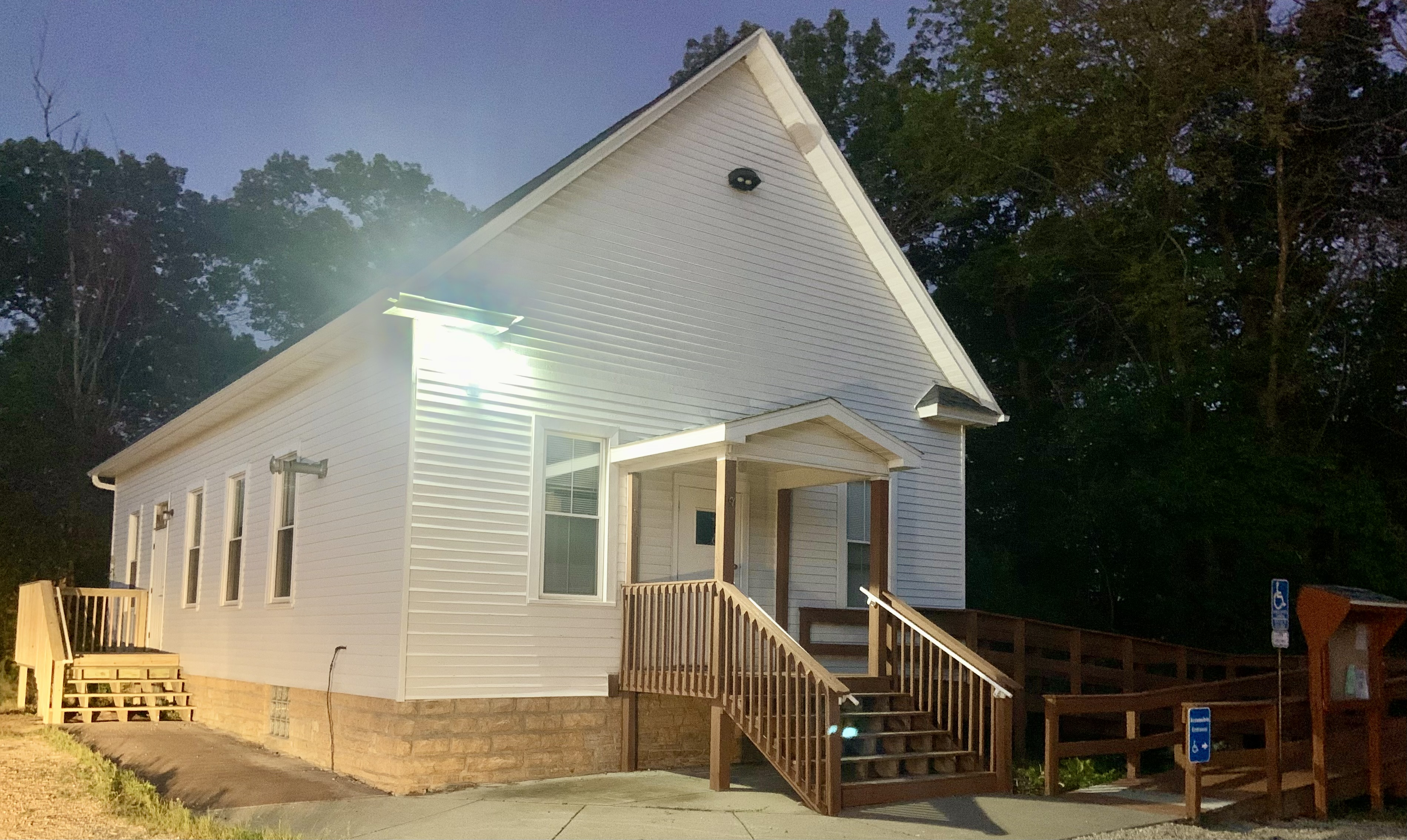
- Town hall

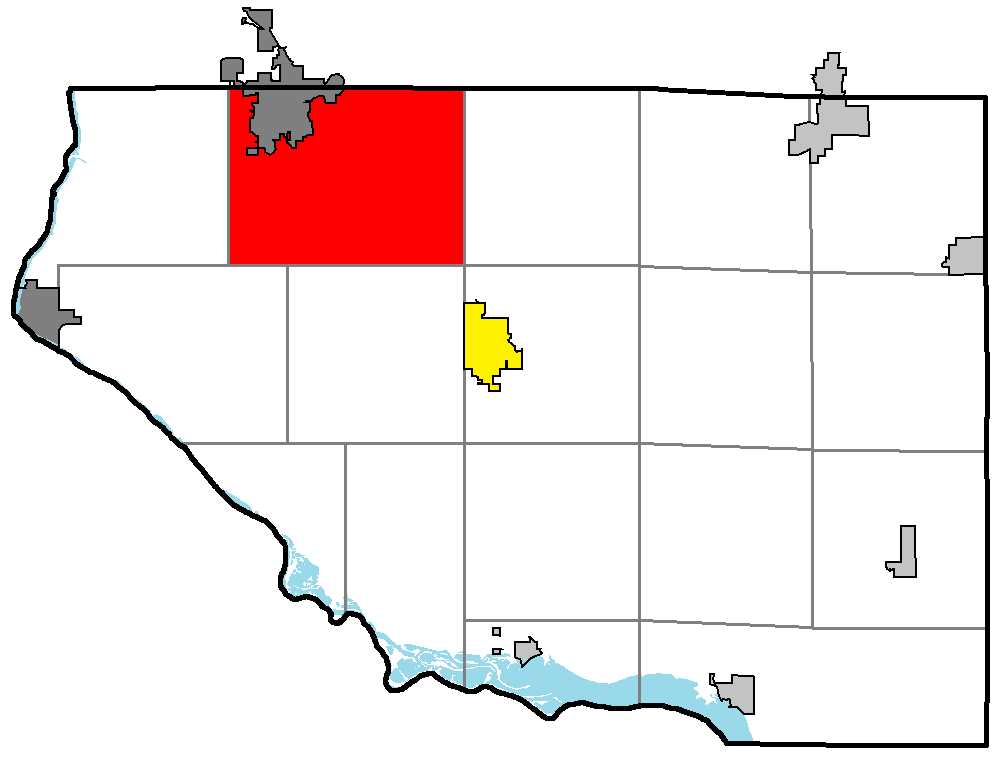
- Location of River Falls, within Pierce County

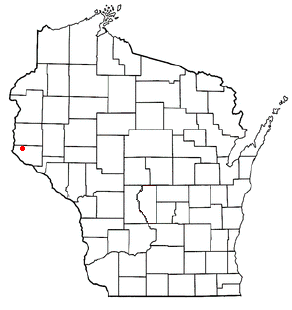
- Location of River Falls, Wisconsin
- Coordinates: 44°49′10″N 92°33′28″W
- Country: United States
- State: Wisconsin
- County: Pierce

Area
  - Total: 44.7 sq mi (115.7 km^{2})
  - Land: 44.7 sq mi (115.7 km^{2})
  - Water: 0 sq mi (0.0 km^{2})
- Elevation: 1,024 ft (312 m)

Population (2020)
  - Total: 2,215
  - Density: 49.58/sq mi (19.14/km^{2})
- Time zone: UTC-6 (Central (CST))
  - Summer (DST): UTC-5 (CDT)
- Area codes: 715 & 534
- FIPS code: 55-68300
- GNIS feature ID: 1584042
- Website: riverfallstown.com

River Falls is a town in Pierce County, Wisconsin, United States. The population was 2,215 at the 2020 census. The City of River Falls is located mostly within the town.

== Geography ==
According to the United States Census Bureau, the town has a total area of 44.7 square miles (115.7 km^{2}), all land.

== Demographics ==
As of the census of 2000, there were 2,304 people, 802 households, and 626 families residing in the town. The population density was 51.6 inhabitants per square mile (19.9/km^{2}). There were 821 housing units at an average density of 18.4 per square mile (7.1/km^{2}). The racial makeup of the town was 98.26% White, 0.30% Black or African American, 0.09% Native American, 0.22% Asian, 0.04% Pacific Islander, 0.52% from other races, and 0.56% from two or more races. 1.26% of the population were Hispanic or Latino of any race.

There were 802 households, out of which 40.9% had children under the age of 18 living with them, 69.1% were married couples living together, 4.6% had a female householder with no husband present, and 21.9% were non-families. 14.5% of all households were made up of individuals, and 2.0% had someone living alone who was 65 years of age or older. The average household size was 2.87 and the average family size was 3.20.

In the town, the population was spread out, with 28.6% under the age of 18, 8.4% from 18 to 24, 29.5% from 25 to 44, 27.3% from 45 to 64, and 6.2% who were 65 years of age or older. The median age was 37 years. For every 100 females, there were 103.0 males. For every 100 females age 18 and over, there were 105.0 males.

The median income for a household in the town was $65,721, and the median income for a family was $71,750. Males had a median income of $45,577 versus $26,328 for females. The per capita income for the town was $26,358. About 2.7% of families and 4.6% of the population were below the poverty line, including 5.0% of those under age 18 and none of those age 65 or over.
