= Richard Kreul =

American politician (1924–2011)

Richard Kreul (April 26, 1924 – February 25, 2011) was a member of the Wisconsin State Senate.

== Biography ==
Kreul was born Richard Theodore Kreul on April 26, 1924, in Mount Ida, Wisconsin. In 1943, he married Geraldine Ann Walker. They had five children. Kreul was a member of the United Methodist Church. He was a farmer and real estate broker. Kreul also served on the Fennimore School Board. He died on February 25, 2011, in Fennimore, Wisconsin.

== Career ==
Kreul was a member of the Senate from 1978 to 1991. He was a Republican.
