= Wayne W. Wood =

American politician (1930–2025)

Member of the Wisconsin State Assembly
- In office January 7, 1985 – January 3, 2005
- Preceded by: Mark D. Lewis
- Succeeded by: Michael J. Sheridan
- Constituency: 44th district
- In office January 3, 1983 – January 7, 1985
- Preceded by: Stephen R. Leopold
- Succeeded by: Calvin Potter
- Constituency: 26th district
- In office April 16, 1976 – January 3, 1983
- Preceded by: Lewis T. Mittness
- Succeeded by: John Volk
- Constituency: 48th district

Personal details
- Born: January 21, 1930 Janesville, Wisconsin, U.S.
- Died: July 20, 2025 (aged 95) Janesville, Wisconsin, U.S.
- Party: Democratic
- Children: 6
- Occupation: Autoworker, politician

Wayne W. Wood (January 21, 1930 – July 20, 2025) was an American autoworker, contractor and Democratic politician. He served nearly 30 years in the Wisconsin State Assembly (1976–2005), representing Janesville, Wisconsin.

== Background ==
Wood was born in Janesville, Wisconsin on January 21, 1930. He graduated from high school in Stoughton, Wisconsin. Wood was married with six children. He died in Janesville, Wisconsin on July 20, 2025, at the age of 95.

== Career ==
Wood was first elected to the Assembly in a special election in 1976. He was also a member of the Janesville Housing Authority from 1971 to 1977 and the Janesville City Council from 1972 to 1976, serving as President from 1974 to 1975. Wood was a Democrat. He ran for the United States House of Representatives in 1993 as a pro-life Democrat to fill the vacancy left by Les Aspin when he became Bill Clinton's Sec. of Defense, but failed to get the Democratic nomination.
