= Heron Van Gorden =

American politician

Heron Ardell "Pink" Van Gorden (October 9, 1926 – May 19, 2016) was an American politician and businessman.

== Early life, education and military service ==
Van Gorden was born on October 9, 1926, in Alma Center, Wisconsin. He graduated from Neilsville High School in Neillsville, Wisconsin. Van Gorden was an officer in the United States Army and the Wisconsin Army National Guard.

== Career ==
Van Gorden was involved with the family feed business. He served in the Wisconsin Assembly from 1983 to 1993 and was a Republican. He died at the Clark County Health Care Center in Owen, Wisconsin.
