= Donald K. Stitt =

American politician

Donald Kyle Stitt (November 26, 1944–September 16, 2014) was an American politician who was a member of the Wisconsin State Assembly and Wisconsin State Senate, and a chairman of the Republican Party of Wisconsin.

== Biography ==
Stitt was born on November 26, 1944, in Milwaukee, Wisconsin. He graduated from Whitefish Bay High School in Whitefish Bay, Wisconsin. Later, he graduated from the University of Wisconsin–Madison, Marquette University Law School and Georgetown University Law Center. Stitt was married with four children. He died on September 16, 2014, in Jacksonville, Florida.

== Career ==
Stitt had been a member of the Port Washington, Wisconsin Board of Education from 1978 to 1984. Stitt was first elected to the Assembly in a special election in 1979 and was re-elected in 1980 and 1982. He was first elected to the Senate in 1984, representing the 20th District. During his time as a Senator, Stitt served as Chairman of the Republican Party of Wisconsin from 1988 to 1989. Stitt remained in the Senate until 1993, when he was succeeded by Mary Panzer.

After serving in the state legislature, Stitt became a partner in the law firm of Whyte, Hirschboeck Dudek.
