= Freedom, Forest County, Wisconsin =

Freedom, Wisconsin
- Town
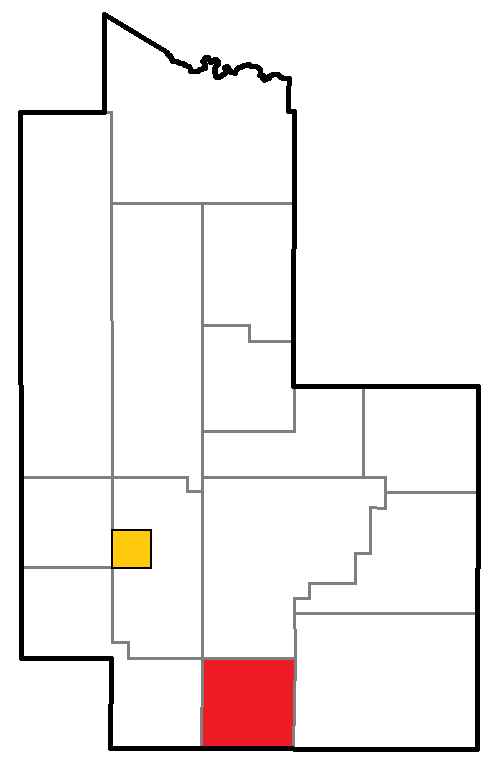
- Location of Freedom, within Forest County
- Coordinates: 45°25′54″N 88°45′3″W
- Country: United States
- State: Wisconsin
- County: Forest

Area
  - Total: 36.1 sq mi (93.5 km^{2})
  - Land: 34.1 sq mi (88.2 km^{2})
  - Water: 2.0 sq mi (5.3 km^{2})
- Elevation: 1,565 ft (477 m)

Population (2020)
  - Total: 324
  - Density: 9.51/sq mi (3.67/km^{2})
- Time zone: UTC-6 (Central (CST))
  - Summer (DST): UTC-5 (CDT)
- Area codes: 715 & 534
- FIPS code: 55-27600
- GNIS feature ID: 1583241

Freedom is a town in Forest County, Wisconsin, United States. The population was 324 at the 2020 census.

== Geography ==
According to the United States Census Bureau, the town has a total area of 36.1 square miles (93 km^{2}), of which 34.1 square miles (88 km^{2}) is land and 2.0 square miles (5.2 km^{2}), or 5.62%, is water.

== Demographics ==
As of the census of 2000, there were 376 people, 158 households, and 115 families residing in the town. The population density was 11.0 people per square mile (4.3/km^{2}). There were 435 housing units at an average density of 12.8 per square mile (4.9/km^{2}). The racial makeup of the town was 99.73% White and 0.27% Native American. Hispanic or Latino of any race were 1.06% of the population.

There were 158 households, out of which 20.9% had children under the age of 18 living with them, 66.5% were married couples living together, 1.9% had a female householder with no husband present, and 26.6% were non-families. 21.5% of all households were made up of individuals, and 10.1% had someone living alone who was 65 years of age or older. The average household size was 2.38 and the average family size was 2.78.

In the town, the population was spread out, with 20.5% under the age of 18, 4.3% from 18 to 24, 21.0% from 25 to 44, 34.8% from 45 to 64, and 19.4% who were 65 years of age or older. The median age was 48 years. For every 100 females, there were 106.6 males. For every 100 females age 18 and over, there were 118.2 males.

The median income for a household in the town was $35,313, and the median income for a family was $38,438. Males had a median income of $26,500 versus $21,000 for females. The per capita income for the town was $17,280. About 3.4% of families and 5.6% of the population were below the poverty line, including none of those under age 18 and 9.1% of those age 65 or over.

== Notable people ==
- John Volk, Wisconsin State Assembly
