= John Volk =

American politician

John Volk (September 28, 1915 – November 23, 2008) was an American politician. He was a member of the Wisconsin State Assembly and chairman of Freedom, Wisconsin.

Born in Freedom, Volk was a farmer. He served as town chairman of Freedom in the 1940s. In a special election in June 1983, he was elected to the Wisconsin State Assembly, serving until 1991. He was a Democrat.
