= Caleb P. Barns =

American lawyer, businessman, and legislator

- Caleb P. Barns, Burlington Historical Society

Member of the Wisconsin State Assembly
- In office January 1, 1855 – January 7, 1856
- Preceded by: Nelson R. Norton
- Succeeded by: John T. Palmer
- Constituency: Racine 4th district
- In office January 7, 1850 – January 6, 1851
- Preceded by: Maurice L. Ayers
- Succeeded by: James Tinker
- Constituency: Racine 3rd district

Personal details
- Born: January 12, 1812 Owego, New York, U.S.
- Died: October 29, 1866 (aged 54) Burlington, Wisconsin, U.S.
- Resting place: Burlington Cemetery, Burlington, Wisconsin
- Party: Democratic; Whig (1843)
- Spouse: Elizabeth Ann Eddy (m. 1845; died 1864)
- Children: Alfred A. Barns^{(b. 1847; died 1847)}; Lucy Shepard Barns^{(b. 1848; died 1849)}; Cornelia (Baxter)^{(b. 1852; died 1926)}; Elizabeth Barns^{(b. 1855; died 1855)}; Frederick W. Barns^{(b. 1860; died 1883)}; Charles Edward Barns^{(b. 1862; died 1937)}
- Relatives: Cornelia Barns (granddaughter)
- Profession: lawyer, banker

Caleb Paul Barns (January 12, 1812 – October 29, 1866) was an American lawyer, businessman, and Wisconsin pioneer. He served two terms in the Wisconsin State Assembly, representing western Racine County during the 1850 and 1855 sessions.

== Early life ==
Born in Owego, New York, Barns (or Barnes as it was spelled much of the time) grew up in the western part of New York, most likely in or near Chautauqua County. Little is known of his boyhood, although a couple vague clues exist. One addresses his "good scholastic and legal education," while another indicates that he was "early thrown upon his own resources." After describing Barns as a person of "extreme reticence," a writer continued, "few men have lived so long in one community as he did of whose personal history so little is known by their neighbors generally."

== Migration to Wisconsin ==
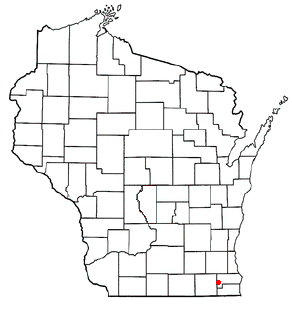
Burlington, Wisconsin.

As a young man, Caleb Barns moved to Wisconsin Territory, settling in Burlington, Wisconsin. Local history sources claim that he journeyed to Wisconsin prior to 1840, returning to New York to marry his future wife. Other sources date his arrival as 1842. David L. Wells of Utica, New York brought his wife, the former Cornelia Eddy, to Burlington at about the same time. Wells, destined to become Barns' brother-in-law, was appointed postmaster. The close association between the Barns and Wells families continued for decades, as the families became increasingly intertwined.

=== Family life ===
In 1845 Barns married Elizabeth Ann Eddy, of Troy, New York, a daughter of Asa Eddy and Lucy (Shepard) Eddy. Elizabeth had been a student at the Emma Willard School for Girls in Troy, New York, a pioneering institution in women's education. It is not known whether they knew each other in New York or were introduced through family connections in Wisconsin.

Caleb Barns and his wife, Elizabeth, were parents to three children who survived infancy: Cornelia, born about 1852, Frederick W., born in November, 1860, and Charles Edward Barns, born in July, 1862. Their first two children and their fourth died in infancy and are buried in the family plot at Burlington. These were Alfred A. Barns (February 1847 – 26 August 1847), Lucy Shepard Barns (1848 – 20 October 1849) and Elizabeth Barns (January 1855- 16 July 1855). Lucy Shepard Barns was named for Elizabeth Eddy Barns' mother.

In the early 1850s, David and Cornelia Wells, and their two young sons, Asa Eddy Wells and Frederick Elisha Wells, left Burlington and settled near Sutter Creek in California. Their departure was believed influenced by Cornelia Well's physical state, as she was then suffering from tuberculosis. In spring of 1856, Cornelia Eddy Wells died from her illness. Compounding the tragedy, several months later David Wells was thrown from his horse and died next day. The two orphaned sons, aged 9 and 11, were placed on a ship bound for New York, and then escorted by relatives to Burlington. There they joined the Barns family, making it a family of five. As noted above, Caleb and Elizabeth Barns gave birth to son Frederick W. Barns in 1860, followed by Charles E. Barns in 1862. There were now five children in the home, three Barns and two Wells.

=== Law practice ===
As Caleb Barns established himself in his new community, he opened a law practice. At first he partnered with James Strang, whom he had known in New York. Strang was a recent convert to the Church of Jesus Christ of Latter Day Saints, and would soon move to Michigan with his followers. Barns constructed a bank in 1847, establishing his office on an upper floor.

Years later, a short obituary published by the State Bar Association of Wisconsin credited Barns' "great success" as a lawyer to the following characteristics that he exemplified:

complete self reliance, untiring industry, a vigorous and unclouded intellect, a good scholastic and legal education, quick perceptive faculties, and especially a profound knowledge of human nature and character, which latter greatly enabled him to conduct the examination of witnesses with remarkable success. He was very cautious in giving advice, and very few of his clients, if any, complained that he excited hopes and expectations which were not realized by the result.

Another writer continued:

His preparation of his cases for trial was most complete. Although his mind was so constituted that he seemed to grasp almost intuitively the principles involved in a case, yet he was never satisfied with this, but with patient industry he investigated it to its most minute details, and was therefore able to predict with reasonable certainty the results of the trial.

=== Political office ===
In 1843 Caleb Barns was nominated for Representative by the Whig Party. The newspaper declared, "it is a good ticket, and a friend from that county, says it will be elected by a handsome majority." Unfortunately for Barns, the Democrats took Racine County positions by a margin of over 200 votes. Barns switched parties, and in 1848, the year of Wisconsin's statehood, ran as a Democrat for the Assembly from the district of Yorkville, Rochester and Burlington. He lost by three votes to the Whig nominee, Samuel Chapman. The following year, he again ran as a Democrat. This time he, three other Democrats, and an independent were elected.

In 1850 Barns entered the Wisconsin State Assembly for a one-year term. He was elected again and served another term in 1855. In 1862 he was a Democratic nominee for the Wisconsin State Senate. This time, his opponent was a Republican, who subsequently won the election. The following year Barns served as a delegate to the Democratic State Convention, one of two delegates seated from the Racine District. His commitment to politics was long-standing and far-reaching.

== Illnesses and death ==
In later years as his health deteriorated, Barns turned to banking, which proved quite profitable for him. A colleague described the transition,

Admonished by his failing health that he was no longer equal to the demands of active professional life, he several years ago gave up the practice of law, and entered into financial business. The same qualities that brought to him success and eminence in his profession rendered him successful in his new employment . . .

Barns also applied his financial skills in service to his community. When the Burlington's first school board was organized in 1858, he volunteered to serve as its treasurer.

After less than two decades of marriage, in February 1864 Elizabeth Eddy Barns died from tuberculosis, a disease that had taken her sister eight years previously. The young Barns boys were two and four years of age, respectively, daughter Cornelia was twelve, and the Wells boys nearly 18 and 20. The household stayed together, although Cornelia Barns lived much of the next decade with a grand aunt in Long Island, New York.

Following the death of his wife, Caleb Barns' health rapidly declined, and he died in October, 1866. A close friend in Burlington declared:

For nearly a quarter of a century he has occupied a prominent position in our midst, a position, which now that he has left us cannot easily be filled. He was long our trusted counselor and advisor, and valued personal friend, and we cannot yet fully appreciate the extent of our loss.

His son Charles Edward Barns was a newspaper writer for the New York Tribune. After traveling in India, China and Japan, He returned to Flushing, New York and published short stories, poetry, and drama-novels. Late in life, he became chiefly known as an astronomer.

== Notes ==
Wisconsin State Assembly
Preceded by Maurice L. Ayers	Member of the Wisconsin State Assembly from the Racine 3rd district January 7, 1850 – January 6, 1851	Succeeded by James Tinker
Preceded by Nelson R. Norton	Member of the Wisconsin State Assembly from the Racine 4th district January 1, 1855 – January 7, 1856	Succeeded by John T. Palmer
