= Wisconsin's 33rd Assembly district =

American legislative district in southeast Wisconsin

Wisconsin's 33rd State Assembly district
- 2024 map defined in 2023 Wisc. Act 94; 2022 map defined in Johnson v. Wisconsin Elections Commission; 2011 map was defined in 2011 Wisc. Act 43
Assemblymember
Robin Vos; R–Rochester
since January 6, 2025 (1 years)
- Demographics: 90.26% White; 1.18% Black; 5.47% Hispanic; 1.03% Asian; 1.51% Native American; 0.07% Hawaiian/Pacific Islander
- Population (2020) • Voting age: 59,759; 47,535
- Website: Official website
- Notes: Southeast Wisconsin

The 33rd Assembly district of Wisconsin is one of 99 districts in the Wisconsin State Assembly. Located in southeast Wisconsin, the district comprises much of eastern Walworth County and southwest Racine County. It includes the city of Burlington and most of the city of Lake Geneva, and the villages of East Troy and Union Grove. It also contains the Big Foot Beach State Park and Grand Geneva Resort Airport. The district is represented by Republican Speaker of the Assembly Robin Vos, since January 2025; Vos previously represented the 63rd district from 2005 to 2025.

The 33rd Assembly district is located within Wisconsin's 11th Senate district, along with the 31st and 32nd Assembly districts.

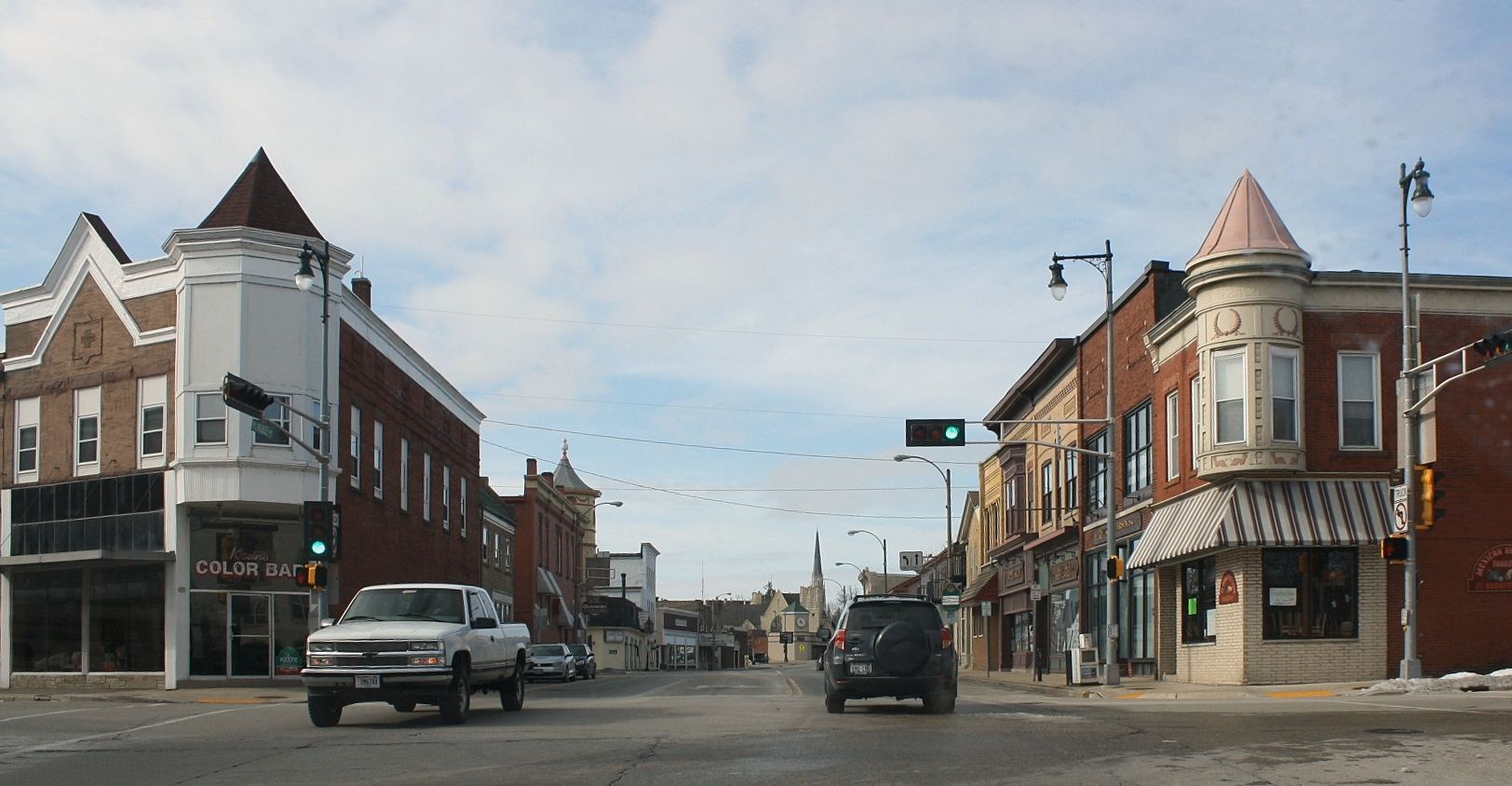
Downtown Historic District in Burlington

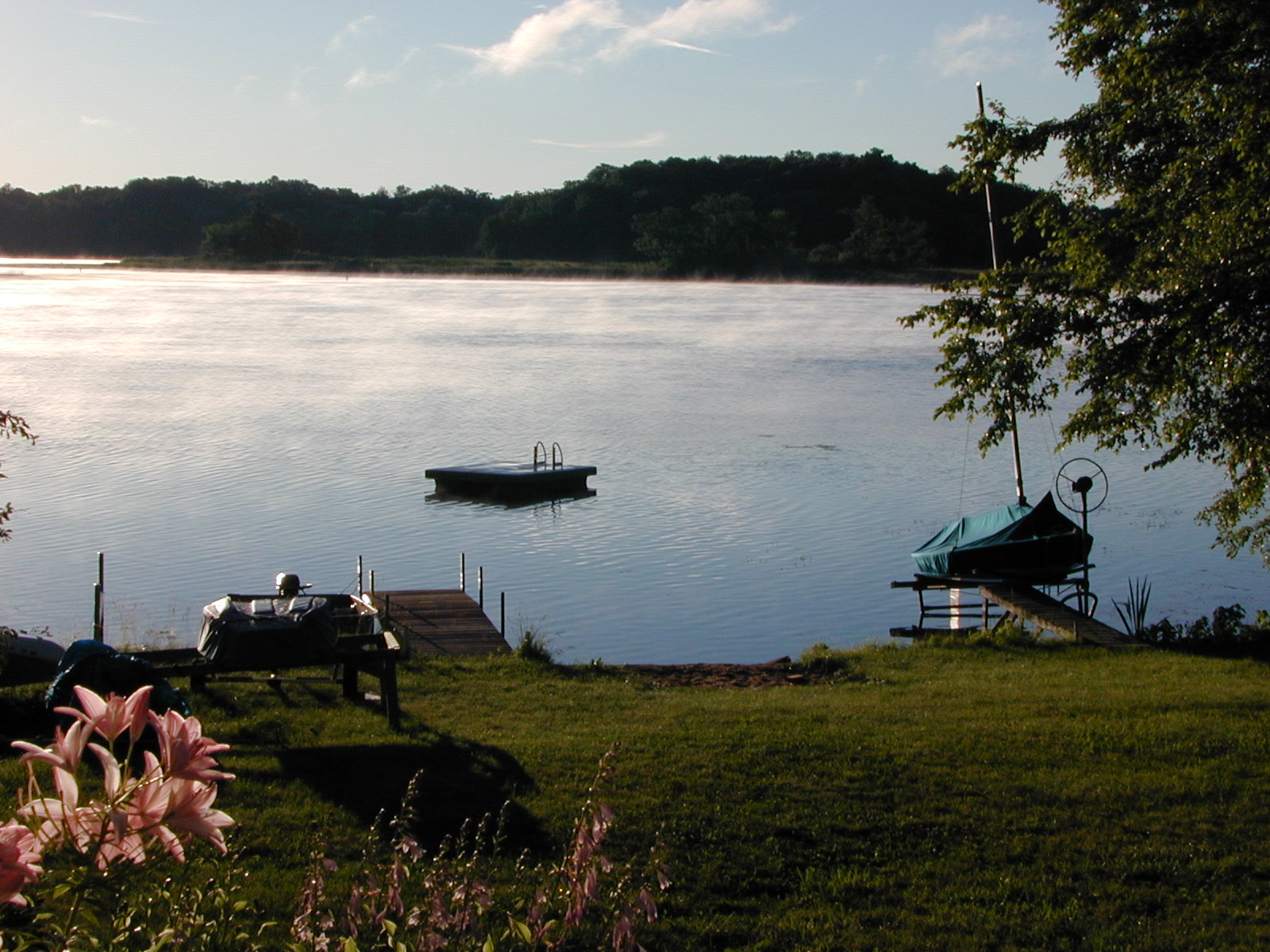
Lake Beulah near East Troy

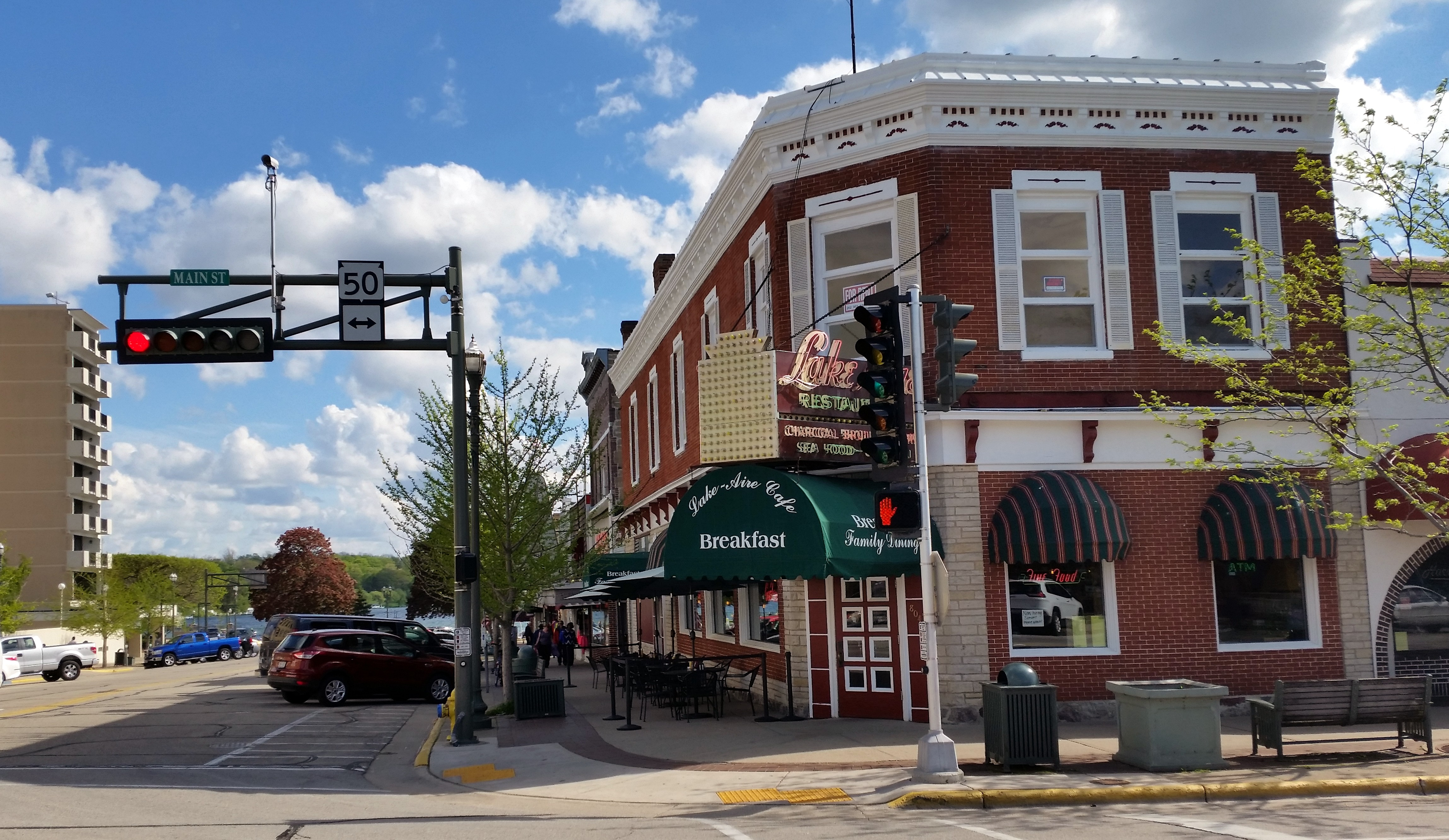
Downtown Lake Geneva

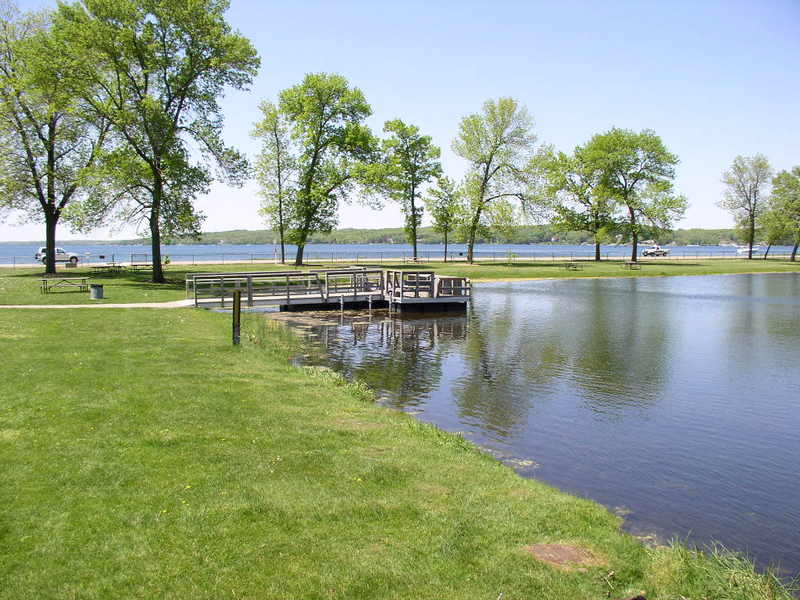
Big Foot Beach State Park

== List of past representatives ==
List of representatives to the Wisconsin State Assembly from the 33rd district
Member	Party	Residence	Counties represented	Term start	Term end	Ref.
District created
Richard E. Pabst	Dem.	Milwaukee	Milwaukee	January 1, 1973	January 5, 1981	
Thomas J. Crawford	Dem.	Milwaukee	Milwaukee	January 5, 1981	January 3, 1983	
Robert Goetsch	Rep.	Oak Grove	Dodge	January 3, 1983	January 7, 1985	
Steven Foti	Rep.	Oconomowoc	Washington, Waukesha	January 7, 1985	January 4, 1993	
Daniel P. Vrakas	Rep.	Hartland	Waukesha	January 4, 1993	October 31, 2005	
--Vacant--			Waukesha	October 31, 2005	January 17, 2006	
Scott Newcomer	Rep.	Delafield	Waukesha	January 17, 2006	January 3, 2011	
Chris Kapenga	Rep.	Delafield	Waukesha	January 3, 2011	January 7, 2013	
Stephen Nass	Rep.	Whitewater	Jefferson, Walworth, Waukesha	January 7, 2013	January 3, 2015	
Cody Horlacher	Rep.	Muskego	Jefferson, Walworth, Waukesha	January 3, 2015	January 2, 2023	
Scott Johnson	Rep.	Hebron	Jefferson, Rock	January 3, 2023	January 6, 2025	
Robin Vos	Rep.	Rochester	Racine, Walworth	January 6, 2025	Current	
Rick Stacey	Rep.	East Troy	Racine, Walworth	Taking office January 2027		

== Electoral history ==
Year	Date	Elected				Defeated				Total	Plurality	Other primary candidates
1972	Nov. 7	Richard E. Pabst	Democratic	11,973	73.42%	Danilo Drobac	Rep.	3,690	22.63%	16,307	8,283	
1972	Nov. 7	Richard E. Pabst	Democratic	11,973	73.42%	Earl Denny	Amer.	384	2.35%	16,307	8,283	
1972	Nov. 7	Richard E. Pabst	Democratic	11,973	73.42%	George Schrank	Ind.	260	1.59%	16,307	8,283	
1974	Nov. 5	Richard E. Pabst (inc.)	Democratic	6,063	71.19%	Christine R. Brien	Rep.	2,454	28.81%	8,517	3,609	
1976	Nov. 2	Richard E. Pabst (inc.)	Democratic	11,246	69.82%	James G. Rebholz	Rep.	4,861	30.18%	16,107	6,385	Patrick G. Holloway (Dem.)
1978	Nov. 7	Richard E. Pabst (inc.)	Democratic	8,433	100.0%					8,433	8,433	Edward F. Leone (Dem.); Joseph M. Konradt (Dem.)
1980	Nov. 4	Thomas J. Crawford	Democratic	11,910	94.22%	Edward F. Leone	Ind.	731	5.78%	12,641	11,179	Richard E. Pabst (inc.) (Dem.)
1982	Nov. 2	Robert Goetsch	Republican	7,641	54.89%	Richard L. Fanshaw	Dem.	6,280	45.11%	13,921	1,361	Christopher J. Blythe (Dem.); George Earl Baumann (Rep.); Henry A. Ballweg (Rep.)
1984	Nov. 6	Steven Foti	Republican	15,838	71.11%	Robert C. Zimmerman	Dem.	6,436	28.89%	22,274	9,402	Carol A. Wilson (Rep.)
1986	Nov. 4	Steven Foti (inc.)	Republican	12,724	100.0%					12,724	12,724	
1988	Nov. 8	Steven Foti (inc.)	Republican	17,620	75.51%	Michael J. Mangan	Dem.	5,714	24.49%	23,334	11,906	
1990	Nov. 6	Steven Foti (inc.)	Republican	10,951	100.0%					10,951	10,951	
1992	Nov. 3	Daniel P. Vrakas	Republican	19,998	90.74%	Michael J. Mangan	Ind.	2,040	9.26%	22,038	17,958	
1994	Nov. 8	Daniel P. Vrakas (inc.)	Republican	15,018	100.0%					15,018	15,018	
1996	Nov. 5	Daniel P. Vrakas (inc.)	Republican	20,165	88.01%	Steven F. Leinstock	Tax.	2,747	11.99%	22,912	17,418	
1998	Nov. 3	Daniel P. Vrakas (inc.)	Republican	17,577	90.90%	James H. House	Tax.	1,760	9.10%	19,337	15,817	
2000	Nov. 7	Daniel P. Vrakas (inc.)	Republican	27,563	99.73%					27,638	27,488	
2002	Nov. 5	Daniel P. Vrakas (inc.)	Republican	17,040	99.84%					17,068	17,012	
2004	Nov. 2	Daniel P. Vrakas (inc.)	Republican	24,501	72.16%	Patrick Byrne	Dem.	9,426	27.76%	33,955	15,075	
2006 (sp)	Jan. 10	Scott Newcomer	Republican	2,438	62.69%	Patrick Byrne	Dem.	1,442	37.08%	3,889	996	Kent D. Woods (Rep.); Troy Fullerton (Rep.); Jack F. Perry (Rep.); David E. Marlow (Rep.)
2006	Nov. 7	Scott Newcomer (inc.)	Republican	18,617	71.63%	Thomas Radosevich	Dem.	7,366	28.34%	25,990	11,251	
2008	Nov. 4	Scott Newcomer (inc.)	Republican	27,746	99.77%					27,811	27,681	
2010	Nov. 2	Chris Kapenga	Republican	23,580	99.50%					23,699	23,461	Brian Dorow (Rep.); Joe Deklotz (Rep.); Steve Ksobiech (Rep.)
2012	Nov. 6	Stephen Nass	Republican	18,891	62.79%	Scott Allan Woods	Dem.	10,229	34.00%	34,495	18,148	
2012	Nov. 6	Stephen Nass	Republican	18,891	62.79%	Terry Virgil	Ind.	945	3.14%	34,495	18,148	
2014	Nov. 4	Cody Horlacher	Republican	19,429	98.04%					19,818	19,040	
2016	Nov. 8	Cody Horlacher (inc.)	Republican	18,851	62.59%	Brandon White	Dem.	11,246	37.34%	30,120	7,605	
2018	Nov. 6	Cody Horlacher (inc.)	Republican	17,236	62.73%	Brandon White	Dem.	10,219	37.19%	27,478	7,017	
2020	Nov. 3	Cody Horlacher (inc.)	Republican	21,496	61.85%	Mason Becker	Dem.	13,228	38.06%	34,755	8,268	
2022	Nov. 8	Scott Johnson	Republican	13,709	50.40%	Don Vruwink	Dem.	13,462	49.49%	27,202	247	Dale W. Oppermann (Rep.)
2024	Nov. 5	Robin Vos	Republican	20,555	56.97%	Alan Kupsik	Dem.	10,739	29.76%	36,083	9,816	Andrew Cegielski (Rep.)
2024	Nov. 5	Robin Vos	Republican	20,555	56.97%	Kelly Clark	Ind.	4,743	13.14%	36,083	9,816	Andrew Cegielski (Rep.)
