= John W. Thomas (Wisconsin politician) =

American politician

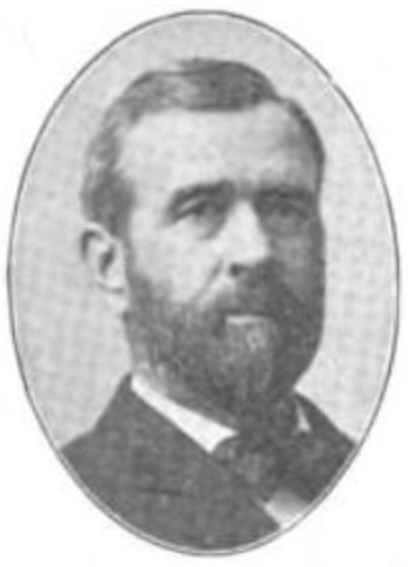

Member of the Wisconsin Senate from the 24th district
- In office January 4, 1909 – January 6, 1913
- Preceded by: James H. Noble
- Succeeded by: Robert W. Monk

8th Railroad Commissioner of Wisconsin
- In office January 5, 1903 – January 7, 1907
- Preceded by: Graham L. Rice
- Succeeded by: Office abolished

Member of the Wisconsin State Assembly from the Chippewa 2nd district
- In office January 7, 1895 – January 5, 1903
- Preceded by: Henry Lebeis
- Succeeded by: William B. Bartlett

Treasurer of Chippewa County, Wisconsin
- In office January 1, 1885 – January 1, 1887
- Preceded by: E. P. Hastings
- Succeeded by: A. J. McDonald

Personal details
- Born: March 31, 1846 Wales, UK
- Died: March 8, 1925 (aged 78) Chippewa Falls, Wisconsin, U.S.
- Resting place: Copp Cemetery, Anson, Wisconsin
- Party: Republican
- Spouse: Marcella M. Fuller (m. 1868–1925)
- Children: Mildred S. Thomas^{(b. 1869; died 1873)}; Clarence Thomas^{(b. 1873; died 1874)}; Laura Thomas^{(b. 1876; died 1876)}; Sarah (Hartzell)^{(b. 1880; died 1940)}; Albert H. Thomas^{(b. 1884; died 1906)}
- Occupation: Farmer, politician

Military service
- Allegiance: United States
- Branch/service: United States Volunteers
- Years of service: 1864–1865
- Rank: Private
- Unit: 36th Reg. Wis. Vol. Infantry
- Battles/wars: American Civil War: Overland Campaign; Siege of Petersburg; Appomattox Campaign

John W. Thomas (March 31, 1846 – March 8, 1925) was a Welsh American immigrant, dairy farmer, and progressive Republican politician. He was the 8th Wisconsin railroad commissioner—at the time a statewide elected office. He also served four years in the Wisconsin State Senate (1909–1912) and eight years in the State Assembly (1895–1902), representing Chippewa County.

== Early life and war service ==
Thomas was born on March 31, 1846, in Wales. At age 3, he emigrated to the United States with his parents. They settled in Tioga County, Pennsylvania, but he was orphaned at age 7. From then, he lived with a family of neighbors, and, at age 11, he accompanied that family west to Chippewa County, Wisconsin. They settled in the town of Anson, Wisconsin, where he was educated in the common schools.

Just before his 18th birthday, he volunteered for service in the Union Army, in the 4th year of the American Civil War. He was enrolled as a private in Company K in the newly organized 36th Wisconsin Infantry Regiment, and served with that regiment through the end of the war. The 36th Wisconsin Infantry mustered into federal service in March 1864 and went immediately to the eastern theater of the war. They arrived in time to join Grant's Overland Campaign, which would grind through Virginia over the spring of 1864, and would spend the next year in the trenches in the Siege of Petersburg. They then participated in the Appomattox campaign which culminated in Lee's surrender.

Thomas returned to Anson after the war and settled a farm, where he maintained a herd of dairy cows, producing award-winning butter products.

== Political career ==
Thomas became deeply involved in local politics in Anson; he was elected town clerk for seven years, was secretary of the school board for three years, was town treasurer for four years, and was a member of the town board for nine years, serving seven years as chairman. He was also elected to the Chippewa County board of supervisors, was chairman for two years, and was elected to one term as county treasurer in 1884.

He was also active in the Chippewa County Agricultural Society, was secretary for eight years, and was president in 1883. He was also a director of the Eagle Point Insurance Company for more than 20 years, and was treasurer of the company for two years. He was appointed to the State Board of Agriculture in 1897, and reappointed in 1899.

He was elected to his first state office in 1894, when he ran for Wisconsin State Assembly in Chippewa County's 2nd Assembly district. The 2nd district comprised almost all of the county, except for the more densely populated southwest corner. He was re-elected in 1896, 1898, and 1900. During his years in the Assembly, he was always a member of the committee on railroads and was chairman during the 1899 and 1901 sessions.

In 1902, rather than running for another term in the Assembly, he was the Republican nominee for state railroad commissioner. He won the 1902 election with 53% of the vote in a five-way race. He went on to win re-election in 1904. During the 1905 Wisconsin legislative session, the Legislature decided to abolish the position of railroad commissioner and replace it with a board of commissioners appointed by the governor.

In the 1906 election, Thomas sought the Republican nomination for State Treasurer of Wisconsin, but he lost the Republican primary to Andrew H. Dahl.

In 1908, Thomas returned to elected office when he was elected to the Wisconsin State Senate in the 24th State Senate district—then-comprising all of Chippewa, Eau Claire, and Gates counties. He did not run for another term in 1912 and never held another elected office, but remained active for much of the rest of his life supporting Republican candidates and attending Republican conventions.

== Personal life and family ==
John W. Thomas married Marcella Fuller in 1868. They had five children together, though three died in infancy and a fourth child died young.

John Thomas died in Chippewa Falls on March 8, 1925. He was survived by his wife and one daughter.

== Electoral history ==
=== Wisconsin Railroad Commissioner (1902, 1904) ===
Wisconsin Railroad Commissioner Election, 1902
Party	Candidate	Votes	%	±%
General Election, November 4, 1902
Republican	John W. Thomas	189,905	53.42%	−6.42%
Democratic	W. A. Redner	138,119	38.85%	+2.57%
Social Democratic	Oscar L. Lowry	17,197	4.84%	+3.33%
Prohibition	John W. Evans	9,428	2.65%	+0.40%
Socialist Labor	August Simons	866	0.24%	+0.13%
Plurality		51,786	14.57%	-8.99%
Total votes		355,515	100.0%	-19.34%
Republican hold				

Wisconsin Railroad Commissioner Election, 1904
Party	Candidate	Votes	%	±%
General Election, November 8, 1904
Republican	John W. Thomas (incumbent)	248,499	55.71%	+2.30%
Democratic	Ed L. Hanton	148,887	33.38%	−5.47%
Social Democratic	Harry E. Briggs	27,509	6.17%	+1.33%
Republican	Fred O. Tarbox	11,285	2.53%	
Prohibition	David Wood	9,581	2.15%	
Socialist Labor	Carl Gross	266	0.06%	
Plurality		99,612	22.33%	+7.77%
Total votes		446,027	100.0%	+25.46%
Republican hold				

=== Wisconsin Treasurer (1906) ===
Wisconsin State Treasurer Election, 1906
Party	Candidate	Votes	%	±%
Republican Primary, September 4, 1906
Republican	Andrew H. Dahl	44,797	29.95%	
Republican	John J. Kempf	41,886	28.00%	
Republican	John W. Thomas	28,617	19.13%	
Republican	Julius Howland	21,771	14.56%	
Republican	Henry D. James	12,505	8.36%	
Plurality		2,911	1.95%	
Total votes		149,576	100.0%	

=== Wisconsin Senate (1908) ===
Wisconsin Senate, 24th District Election, 1908
Party	Candidate	Votes	%	±%
General Election, November 3, 1908
Republican	John W. Thomas	7,901	58.86%	+0.50%
Democratic	W. H. Frawley	5,522	41.14%	+2.98%
Plurality		2,379	17.72%	-2.48%
Total votes		13,423	100.0%	+3.20%
Republican hold				

Party political offices
Preceded by Graham L. Rice	Republican nominee for Railroad Commissioner of Wisconsin; 1902, 1904	Office abolished
Wisconsin State Assembly
Preceded by Henry Lebeis	Member of the Wisconsin State Assembly from the Chippewa 2nd district January 7, 1895 – January 5, 1903	Succeeded by William B. Bartlett
Wisconsin Senate
Preceded by James H. Noble	Member of the Wisconsin Senate from the 24th district January 4, 1909 – January 6, 1913	Succeeded by Robert W. Monk
Political offices
Preceded by Graham L. Rice	Railroad Commissioner of Wisconsin; January 5, 1903 – January 7, 1907	Office abolished
