= Maurice L. Ayers =

19th century American politician and banker

Member of the Wisconsin State Assembly from the Racine 3rd district
- In office January 1, 1849 – January 7, 1850
- Preceded by: Samuel E. Chapman
- Succeeded by: Caleb P. Barns

Personal details
- Born: December 4, 1819 Monroe County, New York, U.S.
- Died: June 11, 1884 (aged 64) Racine County, Wisconsin, U.S.
- Resting place: Honey Creek Cemetery, Rochester, Wisconsin
- Party: Democratic (after 1849); Free Soil (1849)
- Spouse: Luthera Cook Aiken (m. 1847–1884)
- Children: 7
- Occupation: Banker, farmer, hotelier, politician

Maurice Lloyd Ayers, sometimes listed as M. S. Ayres, (December 4, 1819 – June 11, 1884) was an American banker, farmer, hotelier, and politician from Burlington, Wisconsin, who served a single term as a Free Soil Party member of the Wisconsin State Assembly from Racine County.

== Background ==
Ayers was born on December 4, 1819, in Monroe County, New York. He attended the local public schools until the age of fourteen, when he went to work on a farm for $4 a month.

He went to the Midwest in 1845, landing in Chicago, Illinois, and moving to Rochester, Wisconsin, where he operated a hotel for two years before moving on to Burlington in the same county, where he purchased another hotel, which he operated until 1852.

On May 5, 1847, he married Luthera Aiken, a native of New York State and of Scottish ancestry. They eventually had seven children, two of whom died in infancy.

== Legislature ==
Ayers was elected for the 1849 session of the Assembly, the second session of that body since statehood, representing the district consisting of the Racine County Towns of Burlington, Rochester, and Yorkville. He succeeded Samuel E. Chapman, a Whig.

In the 1850 session, he was succeeded by Caleb P. Barns, a fellow Democrat also from Burlington.

== Later life ==
In 1852, Ayers sold his hotel and purchased 160 acres (65 ha), in Rochester, which he farmed for about five years. He became a stockholder in the Fox River Valley Railroad and moved back to Burlington to help run it for about a year.

Ayers moved to a new farm in Rochester of 320 acres (130 ha), where he lived for the rest of his life. He continued to participate in politics, becoming a member of the Democratic Party and holding various local offices.

In 1872, he was part of a group of men, including J. I. Case, who founded the Bank of Burlington (which was eventually acquired by Marshall & Ilsley Bank). At the time of his death, he was vice president of the First National Bank of Burlington.

As of 1879, he was one of the owners of the malt house on the east bank of the Fox River in Burlington, which was converted in 1947 into the Malt House Theatre. Ayers also owned a controlling interest in Burlington's flour mill and considerable real estate investments.

In March 1880, Ayers gave a lot at the corner of Pine and State streets to the local Episcopal congregation on the condition that a church be built on that lot, failing which the property would revert to the Ayers family. A cornerstone saying "St. John's" was laid in November 1880, but the church was never built, and ownership reverted to the Ayers family. After his death in June 1884, his family members inherited the land.

== Death ==
Ayers died on June 11, 1884.

Wisconsin State Assembly
Preceded by Samuel E. Chapman	Member of the Wisconsin State Assembly from the Racine 3rd district January 1, 1849 – January 7, 1850	Succeeded by Caleb P. Barns
