= Mary Wagner =

American judge, Wisconsin Circuit Court

The Honorable Mary K. Wagner

Chief Judge of the 2nd District of Wisconsin Circuit Courts
- In office August 1, 2008 – July 31, 2014
- Preceded by: Gerald P. Ptacek
- Succeeded by: Allan Torhorst

Wisconsin Circuit Court Judge for the Kenosha Circuit, Branch 6
- In office August 1, 1991 – July 31, 2021
- Preceded by: Gerald W. Breitenbach
- Succeeded by: Angelina Gabriele

Member of the Wisconsin State Assembly from the 66th district
- In office January 1, 1979 – January 1, 1983
- Preceded by: Russell A. Olson
- Succeeded by: Steven M. Foti

Personal details
- Born: Mary Kay Wagner; January 14, 1949 (age 77) Burlington, Wisconsin
- Party: Democratic
- Spouse: Judge John E. Malloy
- Education: University of Wisconsin–Madison (B.S.); University of Wisconsin Law School (J.D.)

Mary Kay Wagner (born January 14, 1949) is an American lawyer and retired judge. She served 30 years as a Wisconsin circuit court judge in Kenosha County (1991–2021) and was chief judge of Wisconsin's 2nd judicial administrative district from 2008 to 2014. Earlier in her career, she represented Kenosha County in the Wisconsin State Assembly for two terms.

== Biography ==
Born in Burlington, Wisconsin, Wagner graduated from Central High School in Salem, Wisconsin. She earned her bachelor's degree from the University of Wisconsin–Madison in 1971 and went to work as a teacher. She was elected Kenosha County Clerk in 1976, then elected to the Wisconsin State Assembly in 1978, representing the 66th assembly district as a Democrat. She continued her education and, in 1982, earned her J.D. from the University of Wisconsin Law School. She was re-elected in 1980, but was defeated seeking re-election in 1982 after being redistricted into a matchup with fellow incumbent Cloyd A. Porter.

After leaving the Assembly, Wagner worked as an attorney and state tax commissioner. In 1991, Kenosha County Circuit Judge Jerold W. Breitenbach declined to seek re-election. Wagner was one of six candidates who decided to run for the open judgeship. She came in second in the primary but was able to defeat Paul F. Wokwicz—an ally of then-Governor Tommy Thompson—in the general election by 621 votes. Judge Wagner went on to win re-election in 1997, 2003, 2009, and 2015.

In 2008, Judge Wagner was appointed Chief Judge of the 2nd Judicial Administrative District by the Wisconsin Supreme Court. She remained chief judge for the maximum 3 two-year terms. She was Chair of the Committee of Chief Judges in 2013 and 2014.

On November 9, 2020, Wagner announced her plans to step down at the end of her fifth term. She said she loved being a judge, but felt it was time to move on. "I wanted to retire at the end of a term so we could have a good election," she said, saying she wanted to make sure she left the bench when her replacement would be elected rather than appointed mid-term.

Former Deputy District Attorney Angelina Gabriele was elected April 6, 2021, to take over the Branch 6 seat beginning August 1, 2021.

== Personal life and family ==
On September 11, 1982, Wagner married Judge John E. Malloy, who was then a Wisconsin Circuit Court Judge in Kenosha County.

== Electoral history ==
=== Wisconsin Assembly (1978, 1980, 1982) ===
Wisconsin Assembly, 66th District Election, 1978
Party	Candidate	Votes	%	±%
Primary Election, September 12, 1978
Democratic	Mary K. Wagner	2,685	54.12%	
Republican	Donald K. Gallagher	1,167	23.52%	
Republican	David R. Roettgen	559	11.27%	
Democratic	Timothy B. Daley	550	11.09%	
Total votes		4,961	100.0%	
General Election, November 7, 1978
Democratic	Mary K. Wagner	7,401	55.51%	
Republican	Donald K. Gallagher	5931	44.49%	
Plurality		1,470	11.03%	
Total votes		13,332	100.0%	
Democratic gain from Republican				

Wisconsin Assembly, 66th District Election, 1980
Party	Candidate	Votes	%	±%
General Election, November 4, 1980
Democratic	Mary K. Wagner (incumbent)	13,838	62.18%	
Republican	John J. Rausch	8,416	37.82%	
Plurality		5,422	24.36%	
Total votes		22,254	100.0%	+66.92%
Democratic hold				

Wisconsin Assembly, 22nd District Election, 1982
Party	Candidate	Votes	%	±%
General Election, November 2, 1982
Republican	Cloyd A. Porter	7,859	54.76%	
Democratic	Mary K. Wagner	6,492	45.24%	
Plurality		1,367	9.53%	
Total votes		14,351	100.0%	
Republican hold				

=== Wisconsin Circuit Court (1991, 1997, 2003, 2009, 2015) ===
Wisconsin Circuit Court, Kenosha Circuit, Branch 6 Election, 1991
Party	Candidate	Votes	%	±%
Primary Election, February 19, 1991
Nonpartisan	Paul F. Wokwicz	3,526	27.09%	
Nonpartisan	Mary K. Wagner	3,184	24.46%	
Nonpartisan	Robert D. Zapf	2,306	17.72%	
Nonpartisan	Sally Yule Mengo	2,043	15.69%	
Nonpartisan	Richard Alan Ginkowski	1,156	8.88%	
Nonpartisan	Beverly A. Jambois	802	6.16%	
Total votes		13,017	100.0%	
General Election, April 2, 1991
Nonpartisan	Mary K. Wagner	8,914	51.80%	
Nonpartisan	Paul F. Wokwicz	8,293	48.20%	
Plurality		621	3.61%	
Total votes		17,207	100.0%	

Wisconsin State Assembly
Preceded by Russell A. Olson	Member of the Wisconsin State Assembly from the 66th district January 1, 1979 – January 1, 1983	Succeeded by Steven M. Foti
Legal offices
Preceded by Jerold W. Breitenbach	Wisconsin Circuit Court Judge for the Kenosha Circuit, Branch 6 August 1, 1991 – July 31, 2021	Succeeded by Angelina Gabriele
Preceded by Gerald P. Ptacek	Chief Judge of the 2nd District of Wisconsin Circuit Courts; August 1, 2008 – July 31, 2014	Succeeded by Allan Torhorst
