= Vruwink =

Vruwink may refer to:

- Amy Sue Vruwink (born 1975), American politician
- Don Vruwink, American educator and politician
- Vruwink MotorCycles, Dutch Sidecarcross frame manufacturing company
