= Scott Newcomer =

American politician (born 1965)

Member of the Wisconsin State Assembly from the 33rd district
- In office January 17, 2006 – January 3, 2011
- Preceded by: Daniel P. Vrakas
- Succeeded by: Chris Kapenga

Personal details
- Born: August 12, 1965 (age 61) Waukesha, Wisconsin
- Party: Republican
- Spouses: Julianne Mercer (m. 1989; div. 2009); Amy Shirley (m. 2011)
- Education: University of Wisconsin–Madison
- Profession: Politician
- Website: Campaign website

Scott Newcomer (August 12, 1965) is an American home inspector and former Republican politician from Waukesha County, Wisconsin. He served five years in the Wisconsin State Assembly, representing Wisconsin's 33rd Assembly district from 2006 to 2011. His political career was ended by sprawling personal scandal involving his marital infidelity and financial entanglements with his then-girlfriend.

== Background ==
Born in Waukesha, Wisconsin, Newcomer graduated from Waukesha South High School in 1983 and received a Bachelor of Science degree from the University of Wisconsin–Madison in 1989. In 1995, Newcomer co-founded the American Home Inspection Training Institute (AHIT), which he sold to a private equity firm shortly before his election to the Wisconsin State Assembly in a 2005 special election.

While in office, Newcomer was the Chair of Financial Institutions as well as on the Committee of Health, Assembly Committee on Public Health and sponsored or co-sponsored 22 bills. In May 2010, Newcomer announced he would not seek reelection stating, "It has been an honor and privilege to represent the people of the 33rd state Assembly district in the Wisconsin State Legislature. The best part of my job has been the many wonderful people I've met throughout Waukesha County and Wisconsin."

In July 2011, Newcomer announced the formation of Newcomer Consulting Group, a business procurement, consulting and lobbying firm based in Madison, Wisconsin. Newcomer's Consulting Group represents largely Republican political groups in Wisconsin, such as The Wisconsin Retail Association and the Independent Business Association of Wisconsin. Newcomer is also the owner of House to Home Inspections, a successful full service Home Inspection company in SE Wisconsin that he runs with his wife Amy.

== Legislation ==
Newcomer has sponsored legislation to streamline consolidation between municipalities by allowing for dual tax rates; this was intended to make consolidation between the Village of Pewaukee and the City of Pewaukee.

In April, 2007, Newcomer sponsored legislation to allow up to six ounces of beer to be given as free samples by stores. The bill was signed into law in May, 2007.

In March, 2008, Newcomer sponsored legislation to enact professional employer organizations (PEOs) in Wisconsin, which allow small businesses to outsource the provision and management of benefits to external groups.

Autism Mandate. Newcomer and the Assembly Republicans said the state should dedicate roughly $6 million more to the Medicaid autism program to eliminate the waiting list. "The most important aspect of my bill was to take care of all those kids on the waiting list. That's what we had to do now because nobody had the perfect solution for the long term," Newcomer said. Newcomer along with fellow Republican Kevin Petersen of Waupaca voted against the children's autism health insurance mandate that was proposed by an executive order by Governor James E. Doyle. Newcomer and Petersen who both have children with autism were the two building blocks in getting the bill defeated in the Republican controlled assembly claiming that less children with autism would receive coverage even if the mandate passed.

== Controversy ==
When Newcomer first ran for office, he listed his address at a Delafield home he was building but did not yet occupy; he lived instead in Elm Grove, Wisconsin. A special prosecutor cleared Newcomer of wrongdoing, and Newcomer pointed out he acted on the advice of the State Elections Board. Donna Frake

In August 2009, Newcomer filed for divorce from his wife. In September 2011, Newcomer was re-married to business partner Amy Shirley, a small business owner and domestic violence advocate (www.dawnwi.org). Newcomer and his wife reside in Newcomer's former district with their four daughters.

In January 2010 the Genesse Center strip mall owned by Newcomer, home to the Lake Country Pool & Spa, sustained $1 million in property damage due to an electrical fire.
