= Daniel P. Vrakas =

American politician

County Executive of Waukesha County
- In office October 18, 2005 – April 21, 2015
- Preceded by: Daniel Finley
- Succeeded by: Paul Farrow

Member of the Wisconsin State Assembly from the 33rd district
- In office January 4, 1993 – October 31, 2005
- Preceded by: Steven Foti
- Succeeded by: Scott Newcomer

Personal details
- Born: October 31, 1955 (age 70) Waukesha, Wisconsin, U.S.
- Party: Republican
- Education: University of Wisconsin–Stevens Point

Daniel P. Vrakas (born October 31, 1955) is an American businessman and Republican politician from Waukesha, Wisconsin. He served 12 years in the Wisconsin State Assembly, representing the 33rd district from 1993 to 2005. He subsequently served ten years as Waukesha County executive.

== Personal life ==
Born in Waukesha, Wisconsin, Vrakas graduated from Waukesha High School (now Waukesha South) in 1974 and from the University of Wisconsin–Stevens Point in 1979. He was a restaurant owner. Vrakas lives in Waukesha County's Lake Country area.

== Political career ==
From 1991 to 2005, Vrakas served in the Wisconsin State Assembly, representing the 33rd Assembly District. In the Assembly, he was the Republican Caucus Chairman. In 2005, he resigned from the Assembly to run for County Executive of Waukesha County. He was elected County Executive in a special election held on October 18, 2005, and was re-elected to serve a four-year term in 2006, and again in 2011. In November 2014, Vrakas announced that he would retire as Waukesha County Executive. He confirmed that he had been treated for prostate cancer.
