= Cody Horlacher =

21st century American politician and judge

Wisconsin Circuit Court Judge for the Waukesha Circuit, Branch 7
- Incumbent
- Assumed office August 1, 2023
- Preceded by: Fred Strampe

Member of the Wisconsin State Assembly from the 33rd district
- In office January 3, 2015 – January 3, 2023
- Preceded by: Stephen Nass
- Succeeded by: Scott Johnson

Personal details
- Born: April 10, 1987 (age 39)
- Party: Republican
- Spouse: Karlee Nimmer Horlacher
- Children: 4
- Education: University of Wisconsin–Whitewater (B.A.); Marquette University Law School (J.D.)
- Profession: Lawyer, politician

Cody Horlacher (born April 10, 1987) is an American lawyer and Republican politician from Waukesha County, Wisconsin. He is a Wisconsin circuit court judge in Waukesha County and previously served four terms as a member of the Wisconsin State Assembly, representing the 33rd Assembly district from 2015 through 2022.

== Biography ==
From East Troy, Wisconsin, Horlacher graduated from East Troy High School. He then received his bachelor's degree from University of Wisconsin–Whitewater and his J.D. degree from Marquette University Law School. Horlacher then served as a special prosecutor for Walworth County, Wisconsin. He is a member of the Republican Party. On November 4, 2014, Horlacher was elected to the Wisconsin State Assembly. He was re-elected in 2016, 2018, and 2020.

In April 2022, Horlacher announced he would not run for a fifth term in the Assembly, and would instead begin preparing to run for a Wisconsin circuit court seat up for election in the 2023 Spring election. Horlacher prevailed in his judicial election on April 4, 2023, defeating incumbent judge Fred Strampe.

== Personal life and family ==
He now resides in Mukwonago, Wisconsin, with his wife Karlee and their four children.

== Electoral history ==
=== Wisconsin Assembly (2014–2020) ===
Year	Election	Date	Elected				Defeated				Total	Plurality
2014	Primary	Aug. 12	Cody Horlacher	Republican	2,195	57.90%	Scott L. Johnson	Rep.	1,317	34.74%	3,791	878
2014	Primary	Aug. 12	Cody Horlacher	Republican	2,195	57.90%	Bill Lurvey	Rep.	278	7.33%	3,791	878
2014	General	Nov. 4	Cody Horlacher	Republican	19,429	98.04%					19,818	19,040
2016	General	Nov. 8	Cody Horlacher (inc)	Republican	18,851	62.59%	Brandon White	Dem.	11,246	37.34%	30,120	7,605
2018	General	Nov. 6	Cody Horlacher (inc)	Republican	17,236	62.73%	Brandon White	Dem.	10,219	37.19%	27,478	7,017
2020	General	Nov. 3	Cody Horlacher (inc)	Republican	21,496	61.85%	Mason Becker	Dem.	13,228	38.06%	34,755	8,268

=== Wisconsin Circuit Court (2023) ===
Wisconsin Circuit Court, Waukesha Circuit, Branch 7 Election, 2023
Party	Candidate	Votes	%	±%
General Election, April 4, 2023
Nonpartisan	Cody Horlacher	71,228	55.20%	
Nonpartisan	Fred Strampe (incumbent)	57,239	44.35%	
	Scattering	571	0.004%	
Total votes		129,038	100.0%	

Wisconsin State Assembly
Preceded by Stephen Nass	Member of the Wisconsin State Assembly from the 33rd district January 3, 2015 – January 2, 2023	Succeeded by Scott Johnson
Legal offices
Preceded by Fred Strampe	Wisconsin Circuit Court Judge for the Waukesha Circuit, Branch 7 August 1, 2023 – present	Incumbent
