= Charles Edward Barns =

American journalist (1862–1937)

- Charles Edward Barns, early 1870s
- Born: July 23, 1862; Burlington, Wisconsin, US
- Died: May 24, 1937 (aged 74); Morgan Hill, California, US
- Education: Columbia University
- Occupations: journalist, short story writer, novelist, science writer
- Employer: New York Tribune
- Spouse: Mabel Balston (1884-1936)
- Children: 3
- Relatives: Caleb P. Barns (father), Elizabeth Eddy (mother), Cornelia Barns (daughter)
- Writing career
- Period: 1889-1929
- Genre: short stories
- Subjects: science, travel
- Notable works: The Amaranth and the Beryl; An Elegy, 1001 Celestial Wonders as Observed with Home-Built Instruments
- Website: www.burlingtonhistory.org

Charles Edward Barns (July 23, 1862 – May 24, 1937) was an American writer, journalist, astronomer, theater impresario, and publisher.

== Early life ==
Charles Barns was born on July 23, 1862, in Burlington, Wisconsin. He is found in the 1870 and 1880 Censuses of Burlington, Wisconsin, enumerated in a household of five children and youths, a housekeeper and a domestic servant. Some background reveals how this came about.

The parents of Charles Barns, Caleb Paul Barns/Barnes and Elizabeth Ann (Eddy) Barns, emigrated from New York State to Wisconsin Territory with the early Euro-American settlers, and Caleb Barns began practicing law. He soon gained a reputation as a skilled and conscientious lawyer. Though claiming little motivation for public life, Caleb Barns served in the Wisconsin State Assembly (1850 and 1855). By his mid forties his health was declining, forcing him to abandon the practice of law, and he turned to banking, where he was likewise highly successful.

Charles Barns' mother, Elizabeth Eddy (later Barns), along with her sister, Cornelia, was educated at the renowned Emma Willard School for Girls in Troy, New York. As new brides, both sisters settled in Burlington, Wisconsin. Cornelia (as Mrs. David L. Wells) gave birth to two sons; Elizabeth and Caleb Barns had a daughter and two sons. In 1848 David Wells lost his job as Burlington postmaster, rumored to be a result of his liberal, anti-slavery politics. In the early 1850s, the Wells family headed for California, where, within six years, Cornelia died of consumption (tuberculosis). A short time later, David Wells was thrown from a horse and mortally wounded. Sons Asa Eddy Wells and Frederick Elisha Wells boarded a ship in San Francisco and soon joined the Barns household in Wisconsin. After their arrival, two Barns boys, Frederick and Charles were born. When young Charles was two years old, his mother Elizabeth died from tuberculosis. Just three years later, his father, Caleb, finally succumbed to his chronic illness. In a note to the Teutonia Glee Club, which had recently performed at their house, Charles' dying father, Caleb, had written,

But I commend the childhood of my two little boys to your kindness and care so far, that you shall be ever ready to discourage in them every deviation from the path of rectitude and virtue––and whenever in after years, you shall meet them and think of me––tell them that I have charged you to repeat the words: Industry––Integrity and Truth.

=== Three orphaned children ===
Caleb Barns left a sufficient estate to provide for his children's education and well-being. Three carefully chosen guardians (family friends Antony Meinhardt and C. E. Dyer and older cousin Asa Eddy Wells), oversaw the housekeeper and servant who managed the home. In their teens, the Barns brothers, who had been educated in Burlington’s schools, enrolled at the newly opened Racine Academy. Frederick Barns entered Williams College, where he was an outstanding student, but dropped out in favor of a business career. By 1880, at 17 and 19, Charles and Frederick Barns were enumerated in the U.S. Census as clerks in a loan office. They were involved at the time as partners in a new bank. In 1883 Frederick and Asa Eddy Wells had gone to Nebraska as banking partners. On a visit home to Burlington Frederick died suddenly of typhoid fever. Only Charles and his sister, who had lived with a grand aunt much of the past 20 years and studied in Europe, remained. She married a Canadian-born lawyer, Hector Baxter, in 1885.

== Career ==
Barns began to follow his father’s footsteps by enrolling in the Columbia University Law School in 1884. He was a man of many interests, and soon drifted toward the study of science and math, launching a lifelong fascination with astronomy and related fields.

After his first semester of law school, Charles Barns married Mabel E. Balston on December 17, 1884. Mabel was the daughter of a businessman who immigrated from Nova Scotia and sold hay and cotton presses in Brooklyn. Their first child, Cornelia Baxter Barns, was born on 25 September 1888. Frederick Balston Barns followed on 19 November 1890. The third child was Mabel Anne, born 19 November 1892. Charles Barns, meanwhile, had gained a staff position on the New York Herald.

=== Novelist and short story writer ===
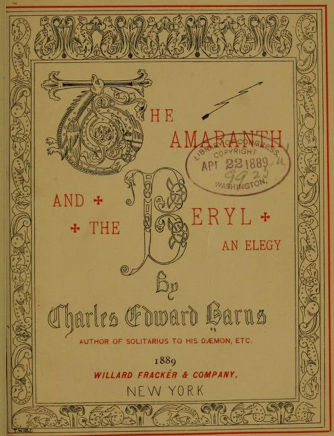
Title Page to The Amaranth and the Beryl, 1889.

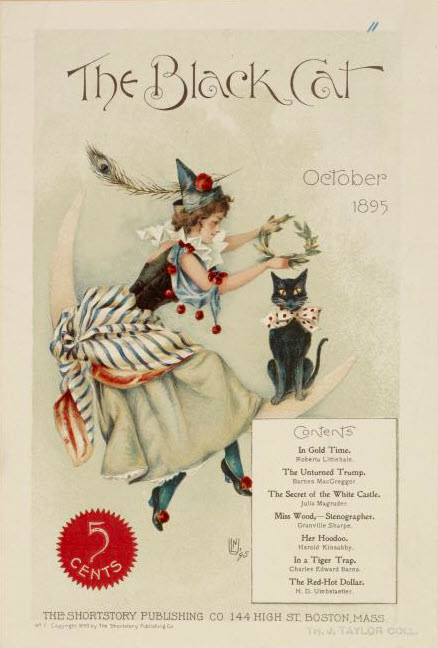
Magazine Cover for The Black Cat, October 1895.

While in his early twenties Charles Barns experienced a severe health problem. To regain his strength, he set out on a trip to the Orient, where he visited towns in China, Japan, and India. His experiences during this time served as a rich source of material for later short stories and novels.

After his travels, Barns published six literary works, all in 1889, and printed by Willard Fracker & Co. of New York:

- The Amaranth and the Beryl; an Elegy
- Digby: Chess Professor
- A Disillusioned Occultist
- A Portrait in Crimsons. A Drama-novel.
- Solitarius to His Dæmon; Three Papers
- A Venetian Study in Black and White

The dedication to The Amaranth and the Beryl stated "In Memoriam, My Brother." It was a poem written for Frederick, who died at twenty-two. Solitarius was dedicated to his older cousin and guardian: "To A. Eddy Wells These Efforts Are Warmly Dedicated." A Disillusioned Occultist was dedicated to "My Companion and Fellow Student in India." One reviewer, however, evaluated the books' appearance as worthier than the content. Barns responded by dedicating his next book,

To My Unappeasable Critics, . . . I Dedicate This Volume With the rash hope of some day meriting their love, their admiration, and a hearty hand-shake.

By 1900 Charles Edward Barns had gained high regard as a writer and journalist. Such was his reputation, that he undertook a little scheme. Three colleagues were of the opinion that a third-rate submission by a known writer would be accepted by editors over a first-rate work by an unknown. As the Black Cat Magazine was sponsoring a contest, Barns proposed to write two short stories of equal merit, submitted under two different names: "Charles Edward Barns" and "S. C. Brean," the latter a transposition of the letters of his name. When the contest closed, the $500 prize was awarded to "S. C. Brean," while the work of Charles Edward Barns failed to merit distinction. Barns was pleased to discover one publisher for whom "pure merit" determined the outcome.

=== Representative short stories ===
Some of Barns's short stories include:

Title	Magazine	Date
The Tragedy of Khartoum	Munsey’s	1895, Jun.
In a Tiger Trap	The Black Cat	1895, Oct.
The Great Dongool Diamond Robbery	Comfort	1895, Nov.
In Solomon's Caverns	The Black Cat	1896, Jan.
Only a Woman’s Wit	Blue Pencil Magazine	1900, Oct.
Cupid and Neptune, or, A Pair . . .	Blue Pencil Magazine	1900, Oct.
The Point of View	The Smart Set	1902, Mar.
Strategy and the Secret	The Argosy	1905, Jul.
Cap’n Ham and the Lioness	The Popular Magazine	1905, Aug.
The Substitute Orchid	The All-Story Magazine	1905, Aug.
Rajah Singha’s Crown Jewel	The All-Story Magazine	1906, Oct.

A short time later it became apparent that Charles Barns was reaching into other interests. An advertisement for Redfields Magazine appeared in the Jefferson County Journal. It read, "An excellent theatrical department conducted by Charles Edward Barns. Latest news of plays and players, illustrated with photographs." At about the same time, Barns was writing words to vaudeville songs, "The Popular Man About Town" and "Keep up the Bluff." and had lent his name for a Bush and Gerts piano advertisement.

"We refer with pride to . . . thousands of purchasers of Bush & Gerts pianos. Among them we may mention Mr. Charles Edward Barns, scientific writer for one of the best New York papers."

=== The Philadelphia years ===
Around 1905 the Barns family relocated to Philadelphia. After the move, Charles Barns had largely abandoned writing. He established himself, however, as a theater manager or impresario. The reason for the move is unknown, but it allowed his older daughter, Cornelia, to enter the Pennsylvania Academy of the Fine Arts. His younger daughter, Mabel Anne Barns, was listed in 1907 among the local “army” of children headed from grammar school to more advanced institutions, in her case, the High School For Girls. Mabel Balston Barns, Charles wife, was listed in 1910 as the buyer of a three-story brick store and dwelling at 2319 Brown St. Son Frederick Balston Barns studied engineering at the Massachusetts Institute of Technology and showed up in Philadelphia in 1914, for a group tour of local factories as part of his training. Charles and Mabel Barns accompanied their artist daughter, Cornelia, on a trip to Europe, sailing home from Marseille on the ship Germania and arriving home in December 1913.

== California years ==
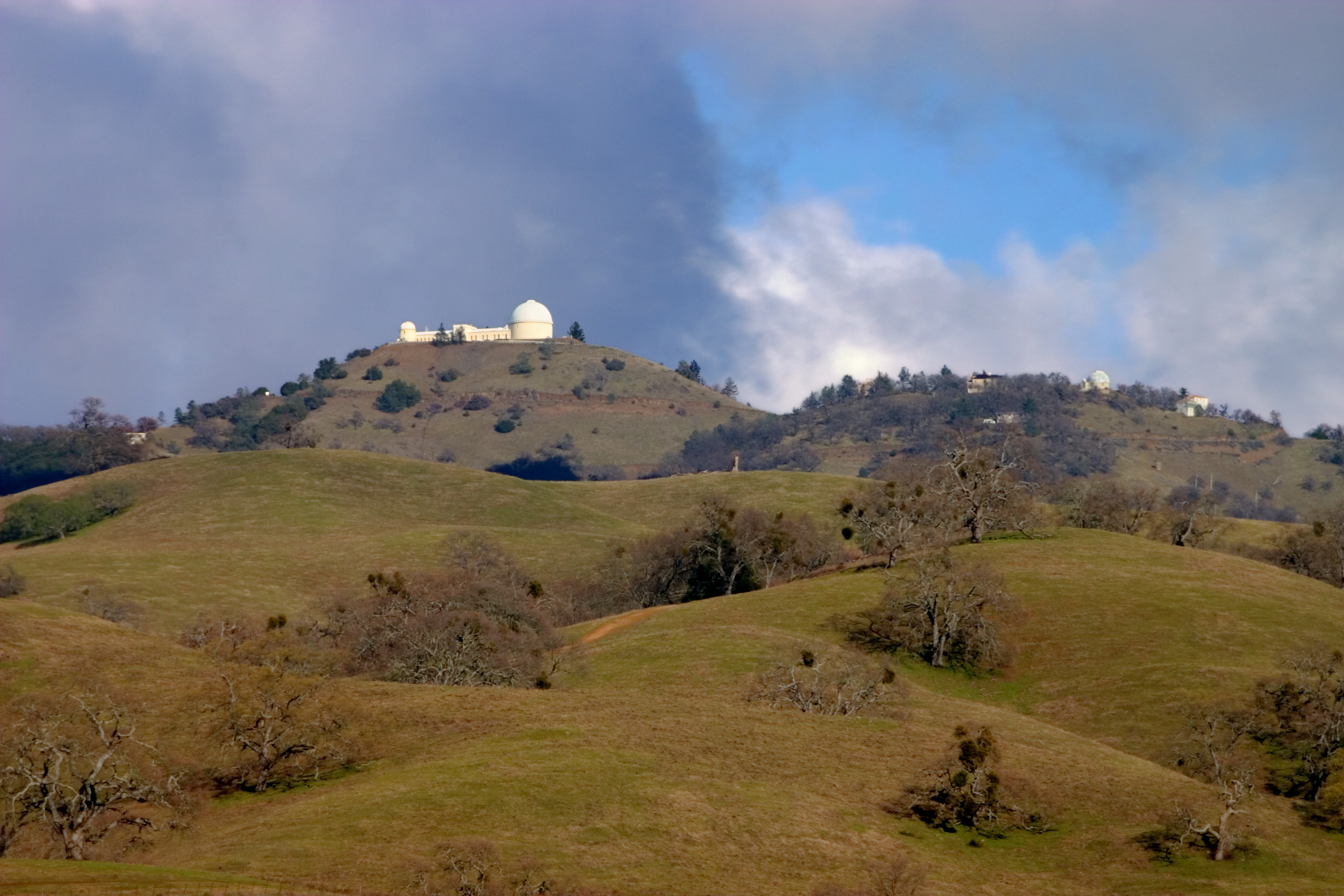
Lick Observatory from Grant Ranch.

In 1915 Charles Barns visited Charles Kellogg, a close friend, bird call imitator, and environmentalist, at his home in Morgan Hill, California, near San José. Barns was so impressed with the landscape and its proximity to the renowned Lick Observatory on Mt. Hamilton that he moved his family there. In 1918 Charles and Mabel purchased a sizable orchard. Soon he added a house, study, shop, printing press and observatory. His daughter Cornelia, married to Arthur Garbett, purchased a nearby ranch two years later.

=== Orchard ===
The 20-acre orchard that became his business had plum and apricot trees. For the 1920 U.S. Census, Charles Barns listed his occupation as “orchardist," Mabel as a housewife. In 1922 and 1924, Charles Barnes [sic] was again listed in the voter registration as orchardist. By 1930 in the U.S. Census, he was a “farmer,” while the voter registration called him a “rancher.”

=== Astronomy and printing press ===
The addition of a home observatory at Morgan Hill culminated years of interest in astronomy as a hobby. Barns was a charter member of the Association of Variable Star Observers and member of the American Astronomical Society. For the former organization, he cataloged their membership, library, and lantern slide collection. Barns was similarly active in the British Astronomical Association and the Astronomical Society of the Pacific. To support his interest in astronomy, Barns obtained a printing press, which he named the "Diana Printery." He began turning out "neatly printed booklets," such as The Practical Observing of Variable Stars. Upon the death of noted astronomer Edward Charles Pickering, Charles Barns published Memorial to Edward Charles Pickering, which included his own poem of tribute. Within the decade he had named his press "Science Service Press" and later "Pacific Science Press."

=== 1001 Celestial Wonders ===
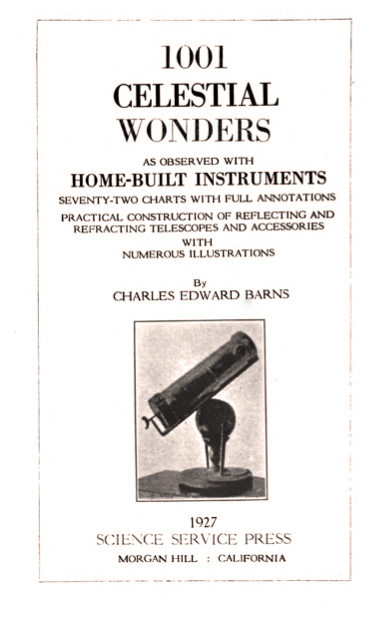
Title Page for 1001 Celestial Wonders, 1927.

In 1927 Charles Barns, now in his mid-sixties, published 1001 Celestial Wonders as Observed Through Home-Built Instruments. The book contained 72 color charts prepared by Barns himself, definitions of astronomical terms, photographs, and additional information. In his dedication to grandson Charles Garbett, Barns described astronomy as a “thrilling adventure” for youth, an “engrossing problem” for adults, and “a joy always” in old age. He "wrote the text, prepared the charts, set the type, stereotyped the forms," and ran the press. The combination of his thorough understanding, unbridled enthusiasm, and missionary zeal made for instant success among both professional and amateur astronomers. Charles Barns showed readers with clarity and precision how to build their own equipment, while simultaneously urging the pursuit of meaningful science. The book was described as “unique in astronomical publications” and a “splendid astronomical hand-book.” The first edition sold out almost immediately, followed by the second edition in 1929. Coinciding with the second edition was a Newspaper Enterprise Association (NEA) press release by San Francisco newspaperman Philip J. Sinnott. Appearing across the country was the subtitle “Ex-Newspaperman with Scientific Bent Studies Stars Through Homemade Telescopes.” An “Oakland All-American Six” delegation from the Oakland Motors Division of General Motors arrived to tour the “Famous Farm" and to obtain a photograph of scientist Barns beside an Oakland model car. On January 11, 1929, Charles Barns was elected a Fellow of the prestigious Royal Astronomical Society.

=== Final years ===
After about 17 years as fruit growers, Charles and Mabel Barns were growing older. They left the orchard and moved to the San Francisco Bay area, near daughters Anne and Cornelia (Mrs. Garbett). Mabel Barns died on October 31, 1936. She was about 71. Seven months later, Charles Barns died on 24 May 1937, at the age of 73. His passing was reported in the Journal of the Royal Astronomical Society.

The lines that Charles Barns wrote for Pickering, are fitting for Barns himself.

Monarchs maintain and pass, forsooth—
The exiled kings, unsceptered czars;
But who adds one cosmic truth,
He shall be deathless as the stars.
