= Raymond J. Moyer =

American politician

Raymond J. Moyer (March 27, 1926 – September 27, 2014) was an American businessman and politician.

Born in Milwaukee, Wisconsin, Moyer moved to Rochester, Wisconsin in 1940 and graduated from the Racine County School of Agriculture. He served in the United States Army during World War II with the military police. Moyer owned the Moyer Motor Company Garage in Rochester, Wisconsin and was also in the insurance business. He served on the Waterford Grade School and High School Board of Education. Moyer also served on the Racine County Board of Supervisors. In 1983, Moyer served in the Wisconsin State Assembly and was a Democrat. Moyer died at Wisconsin Veterans Home-Boland Hall in Milwaukee, Wisconsin.
