= Scott Johnson (Wisconsin politician) =

21st century American politician

Member of the Wisconsin State Assembly from the 33rd district
- In office January 3, 2023 – January 6, 2025
- Preceded by: Cody Horlacher
- Succeeded by: Robin Vos

Personal details
- Born: 1954 (age 71–72) Rock County, Wisconsin, U.S.
- Party: Republican
- Spouse: Jill
- Children: 2
- Education: University of Wisconsin–Madison (BA); University of Wisconsin–Whitewater
- Occupation: Farmer, politician
- Website: Official website Campaign website

Scott L. Johnson (born 1954) is an American farmer, consultant, and Republican politician. He is a member of the Wisconsin State Assembly, representing Wisconsin's 33rd Assembly district since January 2023.

== Biography ==
Scott Johnson was raised on his family's farm near Janesville, Wisconsin, and graduated from Milton High School. He went on to earn his bachelor's degree in agricultural economics from the University of Wisconsin–Madison, in 1977, and attended a master's program at University of Wisconsin–Whitewater.

Johnson owns and operates his own farm, and has worked for many years as a farm consultant, including employment by the large agro-chemical company Monsanto. He also worked as a school bus driver in the Jefferson school district for more than 20 years.

== Political career ==
He was elected to the Fort Atkinson school board in 1998 and was re-elected several times, serving continuously through 2014. Johnson made his first run for Wisconsin State Assembly in 2014, running in the Republican primary for the 33rd Assembly district, which was being vacated by incumbent Stephen Nass, who was instead running for State Senate. Johnson came in second in that primary, behind Cody Horlacher, who went on to represent the district for the next 8 years.

After the Spring 2022 election, Horlacher announced he would not run for re-election in the 2022 election, and would instead run for a Wisconsin circuit court judgeship in 2023. Johnson announced his candidacy for the Republican nomination to replace Horlacher in the 33rd Assembly district. He narrowly defeated Jefferson mayor Dale Oppermann in the Republican primary. In the general election, he faced incumbent Democratic state representative Don Vruwink, who had been drawn into the 33rd Assembly district by the 2022 redistricting plan. This proved to be the closest Assembly race in the state in 2022, and Johnson prevailed by just 247 votes (0.91%).

He took office in January 2023.

== Personal life and family ==
Scott Johnson and his wife Jill live on a farm in the town of Hebron, Wisconsin. They have two adult children.

== Electoral history ==
=== Wisconsin Assembly, 33rd district (2014) ===
Year	Election	Date	Elected				Defeated				Total	Plurality
2014	Primary	Aug. 12	Cody Horlacher	Republican	2,195	57.90%	Scott L. Johnson	Rep.	1,317	34.74%	3,791	878
2014	Primary	Aug. 12	Cody Horlacher	Republican	2,195	57.90%	Bill Lurvey	Rep.	278	7.33%	3,791	878

=== Wisconsin Assembly, 33rd district (2022) ===
Year	Election	Date	Elected				Defeated				Total	Plurality
2022	Primary	Aug. 9	Scott Johnson	Republican	3,293	51.53%	Dale W. Oppermann	Rep.	3,087	48.30%	6,391	206
2022	General	Nov. 8	Scott Johnson	Republican	13,709	50.40%	Don Vruwink	Dem.	13,462	49.49%	27,202	247

=== Wisconsin Assembly, 43rd district (2024) ===
Year	Election	Date	Elected				Defeated				Total	Plurality
2024	Primary	Aug. 13	Scott Johnson	Republican	3,123	70.35%	Dylan Kurtz	Rep.	1,302	29.33%	4,439	1,821
2024	General	Nov. 5	Brienne Brown	Democratic	16,736	51.24%	Scott Johnson	Rep.	15,889	48.64%	32,664	847

Wisconsin State Assembly
Preceded by Cody Horlacher	Member of the Wisconsin State Assembly from the 33rd district January 3, 2023 – present	Incumbent
