= Steven Foti =

American lobbyist and politician

Majority Leader of the Wisconsin State Assembly
- In office January 6, 1997 – January 3, 2005
- Preceded by: Scott R. Jensen
- Succeeded by: Michael Huebsch

Member of the Wisconsin State Assembly
- In office January 4, 1993 – January 3, 2005
- Preceded by: Stephen Nass
- Succeeded by: Joel Kleefisch
- Constituency: 38th Assembly district
- In office January 7, 1985 – January 4, 1993
- Preceded by: Robert Goetsch
- Succeeded by: Daniel P. Vrakas
- Constituency: 33rd Assembly district
- In office January 3, 1983 – January 7, 1985
- Preceded by: Mary Wagner
- Succeeded by: Cloyd A. Porter
- Constituency: 66th Assembly district

Personal details
- Born: December 3, 1958 (age 67) Oconomowoc, Wisconsin, U.S.
- Party: Republican
- Spouse: Anne (div. 2005)
- Children: 3
- Occupation: Lobbyist

Steven M. Foti (born December 3, 1958) is an American lobbyist and Republican politician from Oconomowoc, Wisconsin. He served 22 years in the Wisconsin State Assembly (1983–2005), and was majority leader for four terms, from 1997 to 2005. He now works as a lobbyist for Michael Best Strategies.

Foti was one of several state legislators charged in a 2002 scandal in which public employees were found to have been performing campaign work. Foti pleaded to a misdemeanor, was sentenced to 60 days in jail, and ordered to reimburse the state $300,000 in staff salaries and benefits.

== Career ==
Steven Foti was born and raised and lived much of his life in Oconomowoc, Wisconsin. He graduated from Oconomowoc High School and went on to attend University of Wisconsin–Whitewater, but did not complete a degree. He worked as a real estate salesman and bartender before serving in the Wisconsin State Assembly for 22 years.

In the fall of 2002, Foti and other legislative leaders were ensnared in a caucus scandal. He was charged with one felony count for using his public office to campaign on state time. He pleaded guilty to one misdemeanor, and was sentenced to 60 days in jail with two years of probation.

After leaving the Wisconsin Legislature in 2005, Foti became a lobbyist.

Wisconsin State Assembly
Preceded by Mary Wagner	Member of the Wisconsin State Assembly from the 66th district January 3, 1983 – January 7, 1985	Succeeded by Cloyd A. Porter
Preceded by Robert Goetsch	Member of the Wisconsin State Assembly from the 33rd district January 7, 1985 – January 4, 1993	Succeeded by Daniel P. Vrakas
Preceded by Stephen Nass	Member of the Wisconsin State Assembly from the 38th district January 4, 1993 – January 3, 2005	Succeeded by Joel Kleefisch
Preceded by Scott R. Jensen	Majority Leader of the Wisconsin State Assembly; January 6, 1997 – January 3, 2005	Succeeded by Michael Huebsch
