= Office of the Commissioner of Railroads =

Railroad regulatory agency in Wisconsin

Office of the Commissioner of Railroads of Wisconsin

Agency overview
- Formed: March 10, 1876; 150 years ago
- Preceding agency: Wisconsin Railroad Commission (1874–1876)
- Jurisdiction: Wisconsin
- Headquarters: 4822 Madison Yards Way; Madison, Wisconsin 53707-7854
- Agency executive: Don Vruwink, Commissioner
- Parent agency: Public Service Commission of Wisconsin
- Website: Agency website

The Office of the Commissioner of Railroads is the independent regulatory agency responsible for regulating railroads located in the U.S. state of Wisconsin.

The commissioner was originally much involved in fare setting for the railroads in Wisconsin. The Office of the Commissioner of Railroads is now largely focused on issues of safety. It is the state agency with primary responsibility for making determinations of the adequacy of warning devices at railroad crossings, along with other railroad related regulations. These duties include:

- Installation of new highway/rail crossings
- Alteration of existing crossings
- Closing or consolidating existing crossings
- Repair of rough crossings
- Determining adequate railroad fences and
- Exemptions from railroad track clearance laws

The commissioner's office consists of one full-time commissioner appointed by the governor and confirmed by the Wisconsin State Senate for a six-year term. The current commissioner is Don Vruwink. The commissioner is assisted by a staff of five, as of July 14, 2025.

== History ==
Wisconsin regulation of railroads began with the 1874 passage of the "Potter Law" ("An act relating to Railroads, Express and Telegraph Companies in the State of Wisconsin," later Chapter 273 of the laws of 1874) regulating the freight rates charged by railroads, a central concern of the Grangers movement. The bill was introduced by Republican State Senator Robert L. D. Potter and passed with the support of Governor William Robert Taylor's coalition of Democrats (such as George Howard Paul), reform Republicans, and Grangers (the "Reform party"), which had secured the election of Taylor as governor in 1873. The Board of Railroad Commissioners thus created consisted of three commissioners: John Wesley Hoyt, George Howard Paul, and J. H. Osborn. When the law was challenged by powerful interests led by politician, financier and railroad owner Alexander Mitchell, a compromise with Mitchell was eventually worked out; but the reform coalition was nonetheless defeated in the 1875 election and the Potter Law was repealed in favor of a much weaker substitute body.

== Commissioners ==
Order	Commissioner	Took office	Left office	Notes
-	John W. Hoyt	April 29, 1874	March 10, 1876	Appointed under the original 1874 law.
-	George H. Paul	April 29, 1874	March 10, 1876	Appointed under the original 1874 law.
-	Joseph H. Osborn	April 29, 1874	March 10, 1876	Appointed under the original 1874 law.
1	Dana C. Lamb	March 10, 1876	February 1, 1878	Appointed under the revised 1876 law.
2	A. J. Turner	February 1, 1878	February 15, 1882	Appointed under the revised 1876 law.
3	Nils P. Haugen	February 15, 1882	January 3, 1887	Elected under the 1881 law.
4	Atley Peterson	January 3, 1887	January 5, 1891	Elected
5	Thomas Thompson	January 5, 1891	January 7, 1895	Elected
6	Duncan J. McKenzie	January 7, 1895	January 2, 1899	Elected
7	Graham L. Rice	January 2, 1899	January 5, 1903	Elected
8	John W. Thomas	January 5, 1903	January 7, 1907	Elected
