= George Ela =

American politician

George Ela (October 11, 1868 – February 13, 1957) was an American lawyer, farmer, and politician.

Born in the town of Rochester, Wisconsin, Ela went to the Rochester Academy and then graduated from University of Wisconsin and University of Wisconsin Law School. He was a dairy farmer and livestock dealer. Ela served on the elementary school board as a clerk and on the Rochester Town Board. He also served on the Racine County Board of Supervisors and was chairman of the county board. Ela served in the Wisconsin State Assembly in 1899 and 1901 and was a Republican.
