= Wisconsin's 66th Assembly district =

American legislative district in Racine County, Wisconsin

Wisconsin's 66th State Assembly district
- 2024 map defined in 2023 Wisc. Act 94; 2022 map defined in Johnson v. Wisconsin Elections Commission; 2011 map was defined in 2011 Wisc. Act 43
Assemblymember
Greta Neubauer; D–Racine
since January 27, 2018 (8 years)
- Demographics: 65.5% White; 16.93% Black; 13.63% Hispanic; 2.26% Asian; 1.95% Native American; 0.12% Hawaiian/Pacific Islander
- Population (2020) • Voting age: 59,377; 46,320
- Website: Official website
- Notes: Southeast Wisconsin

The 66th Assembly district of Wisconsin is one of 99 districts in the Wisconsin State Assembly. Located in southeast Wisconsin, the district comprises the southeast corner of Racine County, including the south side of the city of Racine, most of the village of Mount Pleasant, and the villages of Sturtevant and Elmwood Park. The district also contains Johnson Wax Headquarters, Regency Mall, and the Foxconn in Wisconsin campus. The district is represented by Democratic minority leader Greta Neubauer, since January 2018.

The 66th Assembly district is located within Wisconsin's 22nd Senate district, along with the 64th and 65th Assembly districts.

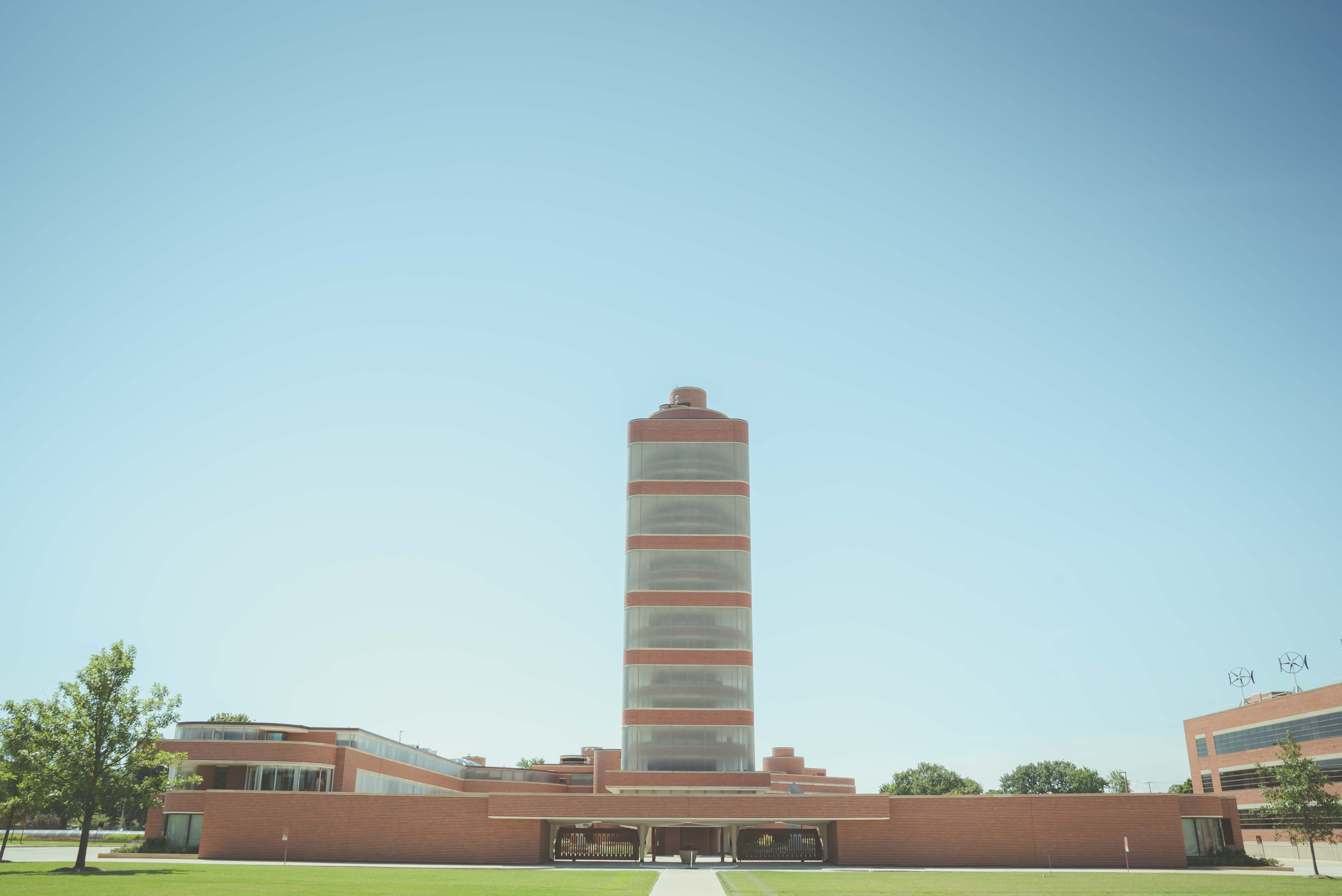
Johnson Wax Headquarters in Racine

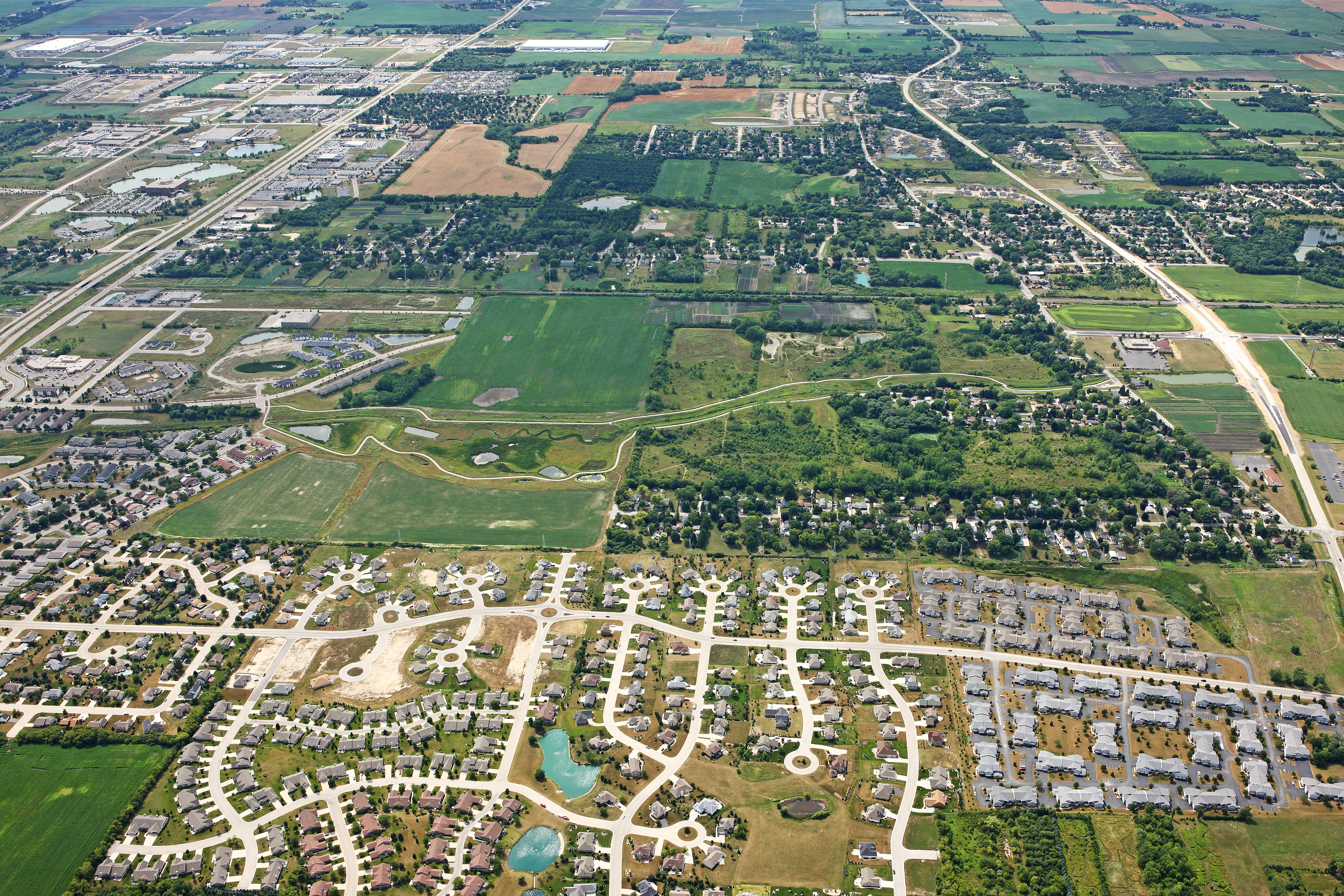
Aerial view of Mount Pleasant

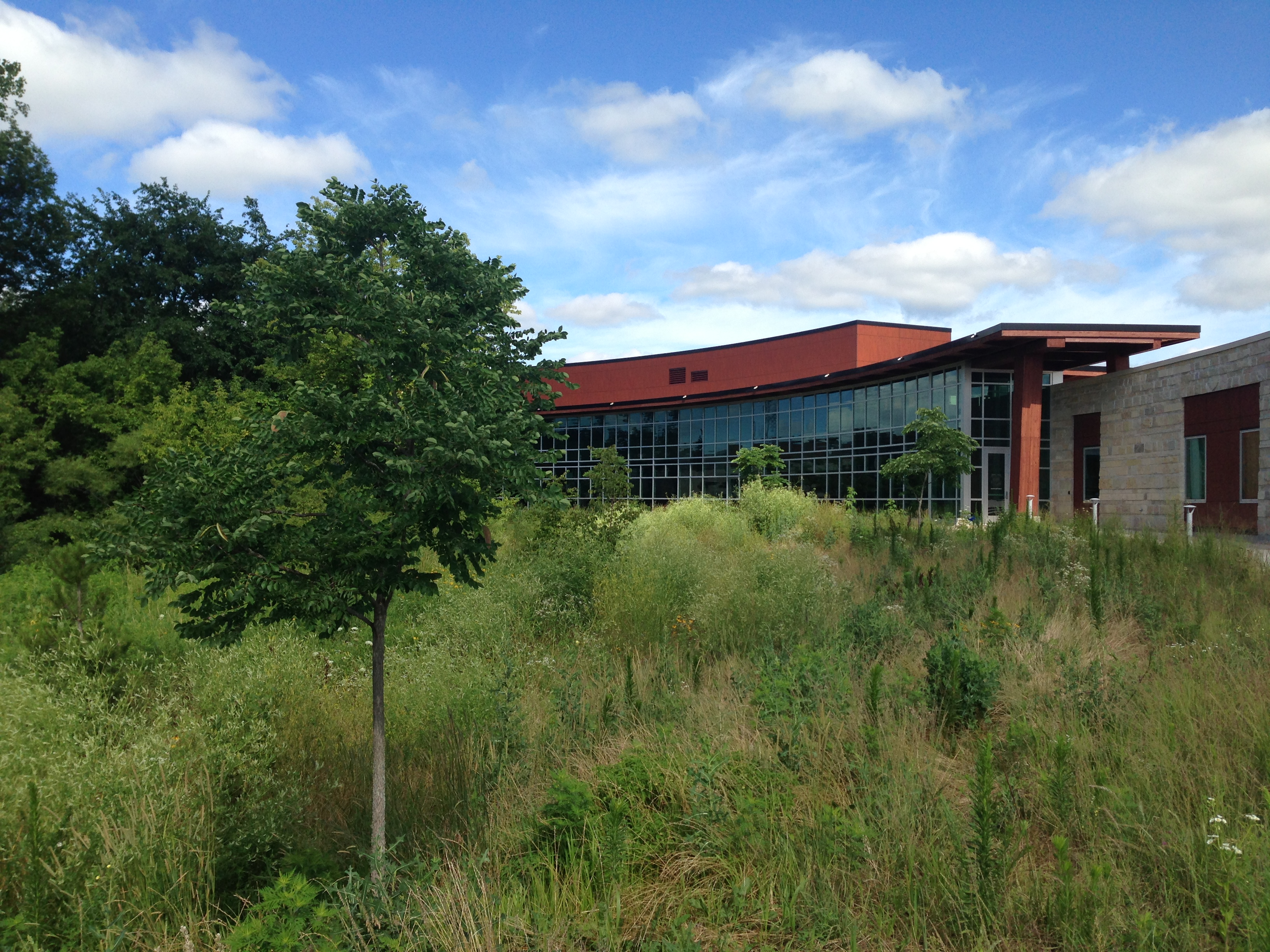
Mount Pleasant Village Hall

== History ==
The district was created in the 1972 redistricting act (1971 Wisc. Act 304) which first established the numbered district system, replacing the previous system which allocated districts to specific counties. The 66th district was drawn somewhat in line with the former Kenosha County 2nd district (Kenosha County excluding most of the city of Kenosha), but removed southeastern Kenosha County and replaced it with a number of neighboring towns in central Racine County and eastern Walworth County.

Other than the 1982 redistricting, which temporarily scrambled State Assembly districts, the boundaries of the 66th district remained relatively consistent for the next 40 years (1972–2011), comprising most of Kenosha County with a rotating set of rural towns from Racine and Walworth counties. That changed in the controversial 2011 redistricting plan (2011 Wisc. Act 43) which moved the district entirely into the city of Racine in Racine County, in area previously represented by the 61st and 62nd Assembly districts. The previous territory covered by the 66th district was then split between the 61st, 63rd, and 64th Assembly districts. This was done as part of a broader gerrymander of the southeast Wisconsin districts to pack the majority of Racine and Kenosha Democratic votes into one state senate district. This map was only slightly adjusted in the 2022 court-ordered redistricting plan. The 2024 redistricting plan unpacked Racine from the district, splitting Racine again between two Assembly districts. The 66th district kept the southern third of the city of Racine and expanded to comprise the neighboring villages in the southeast quadrant of Racine County.

Notable former representatives of this district include Russell Olson, the 39th lieutenant governor of Wisconsin, Mary Wagner, who served as chief judge of the 2nd district of Wisconsin circuit courts, and Cory Mason, the 58th mayor of Racine, Wisconsin.

== List of past representatives ==
List of representatives to the Wisconsin State Assembly from the 66th district
Member	Party	Residence	Counties represented	Term start	Term end	Ref.
District created
Russell Olson	Rep.	Bassett	Kenosha, Racine, Walworth	January 1, 1973	January 1, 1979	
Mary Wagner	Dem.	Brighton	Kenosha, Racine, Walworth	January 1, 1979	January 3, 1983	
Steven Foti	Rep.	Oconomowoc	Washington, Waukesha	January 3, 1983	January 7, 1985	
Cloyd A. Porter	Rep.	Burlington	Kenosha, Racine, Walworth	January 7, 1985	January 1, 2001	
Samantha Kerkman	Rep.	Randall	Kenosha, Racine	January 1, 2001	January 7, 2013	
Cory Mason	Dem.	Racine	Racine	January 7, 2013	January 15, 2018	
--Vacant--			Racine	January 15, 2018	January 27, 2018	
Greta Neubauer	Dem.	Racine	Racine	January 27, 2018	Current	
