= Cloyd A. Porter =

American politician (born 1935)

Member of the Wisconsin State Assembly
- In office January 7, 1985 – January 1, 2001
- Preceded by: Steven M. Foti
- Succeeded by: Samantha Kerkman
- Constituency: 66th district
- In office January 3, 1983 – January 7, 1985
- Preceded by: George Klicka
- Succeeded by: Jeannette Bell
- Constituency: 22nd district
- In office January 1, 1973 – January 3, 1983
- Preceded by: District established
- Succeeded by: Barbara Gronemus
- Constituency: 43rd district

Personal details
- Born: May 22, 1935 (age 91) Huntley, Illinois
- Party: Republican
- Spouse: Joan
- Children: 4
- Profession: Politician

Cloyd A. Porter (born May 22, 1935) is a retired American Republican politician. He was a member of the Wisconsin State Assembly for 28 years (1973–2001), representing Burlington, Wisconsin, and nearby towns in eastern Walworth County and western Racine and Kenosha counties.

== Biography ==
Porter was born on in Huntley, Illinois. He graduated from Burlington High School in Burlington, Wisconsin. Porter is married with four adult children.

== Career ==
Porter had a career in the trucking business before seeking elected office. He served a short time as Burlington Town Chairman before being elected to the Assembly in 1972. He announced his retirement in 2000.
