= Rochester, Wisconsin =

Village in Wisconsin

- Village
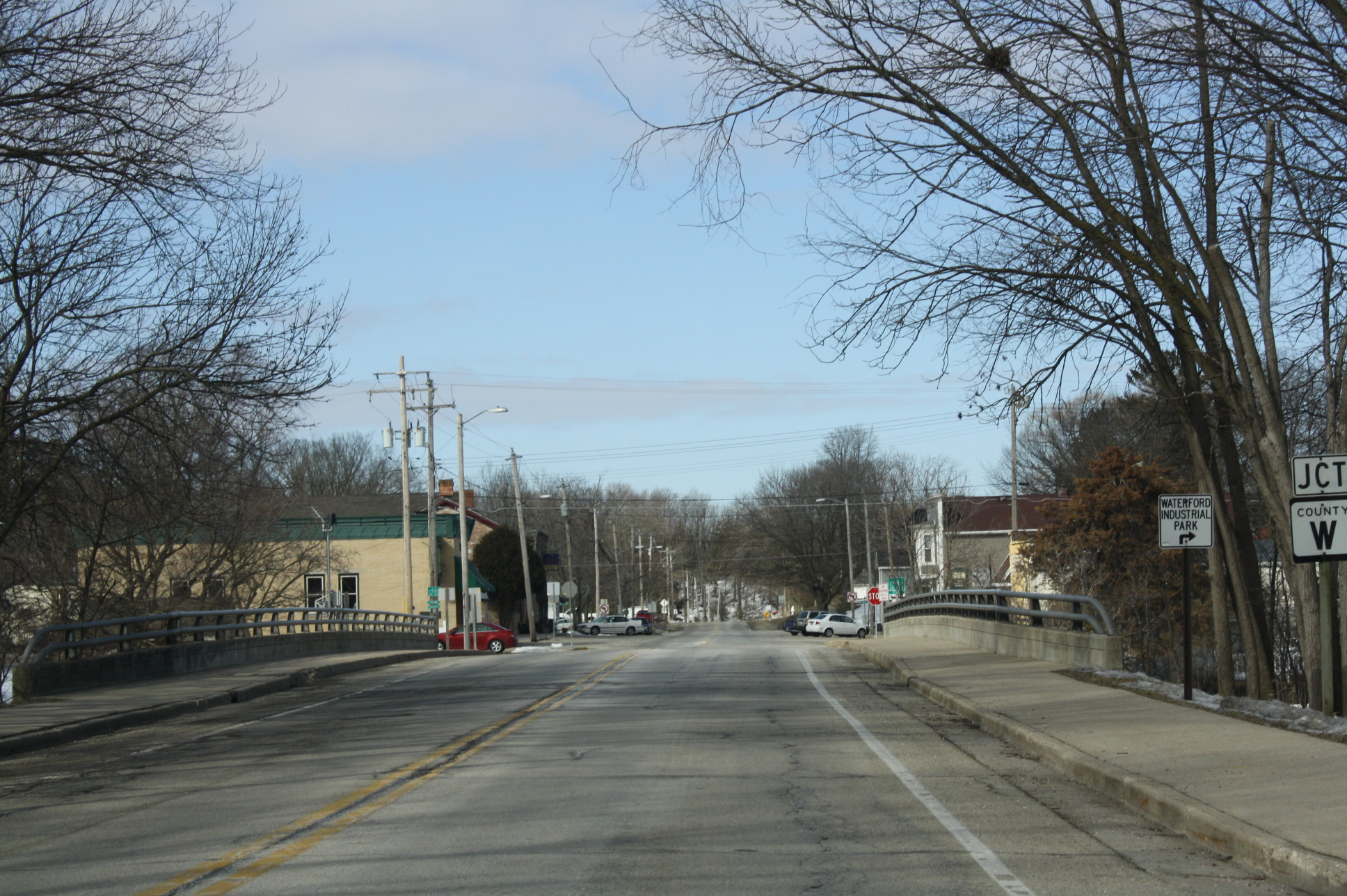
- Looking west in downtown Rochester

- Location of Rochester in Racine County, Wisconsin.
- Coordinates: 42°43′47″N 88°15′11″W
- Country: United States
- State: Wisconsin
- County: Racine

Area
  - Total: 17.65 sq mi (45.71 km^{2})
  - Land: 17.42 sq mi (45.12 km^{2})
  - Water: 0.23 sq mi (0.60 km^{2})
- Elevation: 817 ft (249 m)

Population (2020)
  - Total: 3,785
  - Density: 222.0/sq mi (85.71/km^{2})
- Time zone: UTC-6 (Central (CST))
  - Summer (DST): UTC-5 (CDT)
- ZIP Code: 53167
- Area code: 262
- FIPS code: 55-68575
- GNIS feature ID: 1584047
- Website: rochesterwi.gov

Rochester is a village in Racine County, Wisconsin, United States. The population was 3,785 at the 2020 census. The village is located within the former Town of Rochester. On November 4, 2008, the village of Rochester voted to consolidate with the Town of Rochester.

== History ==
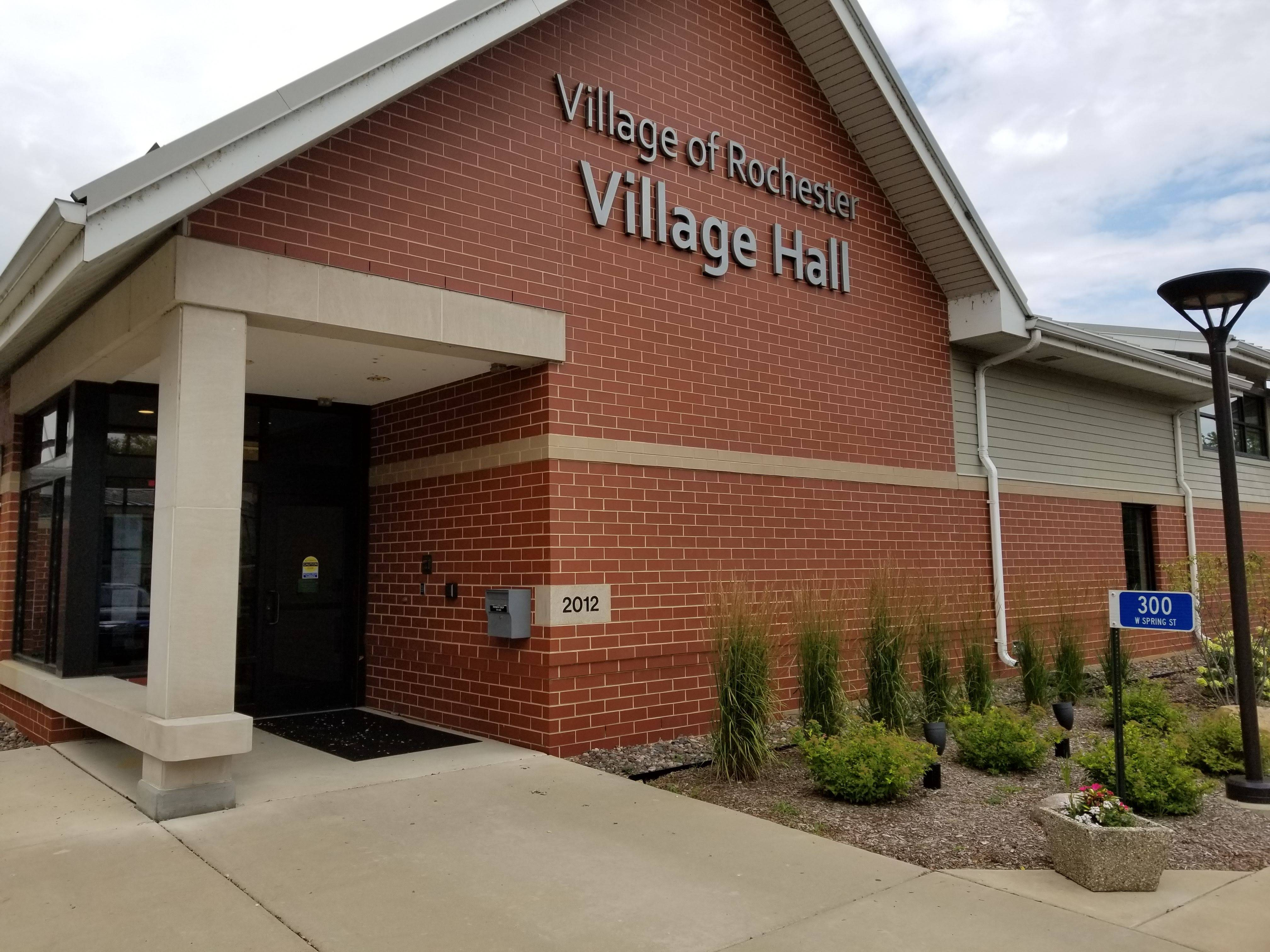
Village Hall

The first non-Native American settlers in Rochester were a group of five farming families, who all hailed from the town of Rochester, Vermont after which they gave their new settlement its name. These were "Yankee" settlers, which is to say they were descended from the English Puritans who settled New England during the colonial era. Correspondingly they were members of the Congregationalist Church and were staunch abolitionists. When they arrived in what is now Rochester there was nothing but dense virgin forest and wild prairie. They laid out post routes, built roads, constructed farms and government buildings all within the first few months of settling in what is now Rochester. Due to the Second Great Awakening, many of them had become Baptists or converted to either Presbyterianism or Methodism before coming to what is now Walworth County.

Rochester holds one of the oldest continuously run Memorial Day observances in the nation, having held its first in 1867.

The Village was incorporated in 1912. The Village and Town of Rochester consolidated in 2008.

== Geography ==
Rochester is located at 42°44′26″N 88°13′26″W (42.740585, -88.224108).

According to the United States Census Bureau, the village has a total area of 17.74 square miles (45.95 km^{2}), of which 17.48 square miles (45.27 km^{2}) is land and 0.26 square miles (0.67 km^{2}) is water.

== Demographics ==
Historical population
Census	Pop.	Note	%±
1860	306		—
1870	392		28.1%
1880	284		−27.6%
1920	220		—
1930	246		11.8%
1940	288		17.1%
1950	333		15.6%
1960	413		24.0%
1970	436		5.6%
1980	746		71.1%
1990	978		31.1%
2000	1,149		17.5%
2010	3,682		220.5%
2020	3,785		2.8%
U.S. Decennial Census

=== 2010 census ===
As of the census of 2010, there were 3,682 people, 1,343 households, and 1,069 families living in the village. The population density was 210.6 inhabitants per square mile (81.3/km^{2}). There were 1,412 housing units at an average density of 80.8 per square mile (31.2/km^{2}). The racial makeup of the village was 97.8% White, 0.2% African American, 0.3% Native American, 0.5% Asian, 0.1% Pacific Islander, 0.5% from other races, and 0.6% from two or more races. Hispanic or Latino of any race were 2.8% of the population.

There were 1,343 households, of which 35.6% had children under the age of 18 living with them, 67.4% were married couples living together, 7.7% had a female householder with no husband present, 4.5% had a male householder with no wife present, and 20.4% were non-families. 15.6% of all households were made up of individuals, and 5% had someone living alone who was 65 years of age or older. The average household size was 2.72 and the average family size was 3.04.

The median age in the village was 42 years. 24.5% of residents were under the age of 18; 6.4% were between the ages of 18 and 24; 23.5% were from 25 to 44; 34.9% were from 45 to 64; and 10.5% were 65 years of age or older. The gender makeup of the village was 51.1% male and 48.9% female.

=== 2000 census ===
As of the census of 2000, there were 1,149 people, 410 households, and 307 families living in the village. The population density was 2,360.6 people per square mile (905.4/km^{2}). There were 425 housing units at an average density of 873.1 per square mile (334.9/km^{2}). The racial makeup of the village was 97.30% White, 0.09% Black or African American, 0.35% Native American, 0.17% Asian, 0.70% from other races, and 1.39% from two or more races. 3.48% of the population were Hispanic or Latino of any race.

There were 410 households, out of which 43.2% had children under the age of 18 living with them, 61.7% were married couples living together, 9.5% had a female householder with no husband present, and 24.9% were non-families. 19.8% of all households were made up of individuals, and 6.3% had someone living alone who was 65 years of age or older. The average household size was 2.80 and the average family size was 3.22.

In the village, the population was spread out, with 30.5% under the age of 18, 7.5% from 18 to 24, 33.3% from 25 to 44, 21.8% from 45 to 64, and 6.8% who were 65 years of age or older. The median age was 35 years. For every 100 females, there were 108.5 males. For every 100 females age 18 and over, there were 100.5 males.

The median income for a household in the village was $55,063, and the median income for a family was $61,875. Males had a median income of $42,159 versus $30,184 for females. The per capita income for the village was $21,609. About 4.9% of families and 4.7% of the population were below the poverty line, including 5.6% of those under age 18 and 10.8% of those age 65 or over.

== Notable people ==
- Maurice L. Ayers, Wisconsin legislator
- Ginger Beaumont, baseball player, first man to bat in a World Series
- Philo Belden, Wisconsin legislator
- Glenn W. Birkett, Wisconsin legislator
- Jerome Case, businessman and founder of Case Corporation here
- George Ela, Wisconsin legislator
- Waldo Flint, Wisconsin legislator
- Charles M. Hambright, Wisconsin legislator
- Jane Hamilton, author
- Raymond J. Moyer, Wisconsin legislator
- James Tinker, Wisconsin legislator

== Images ==
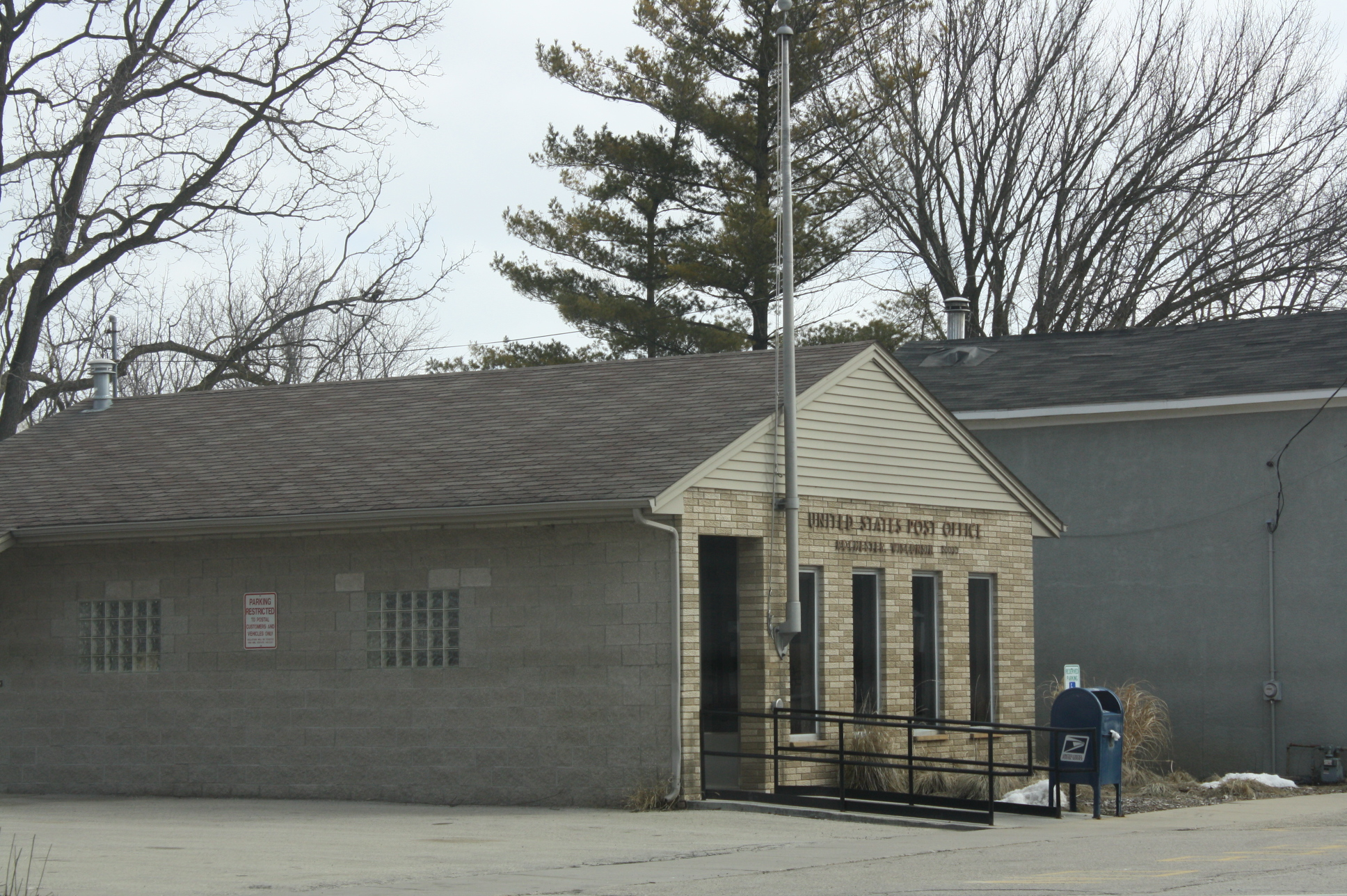
Post office

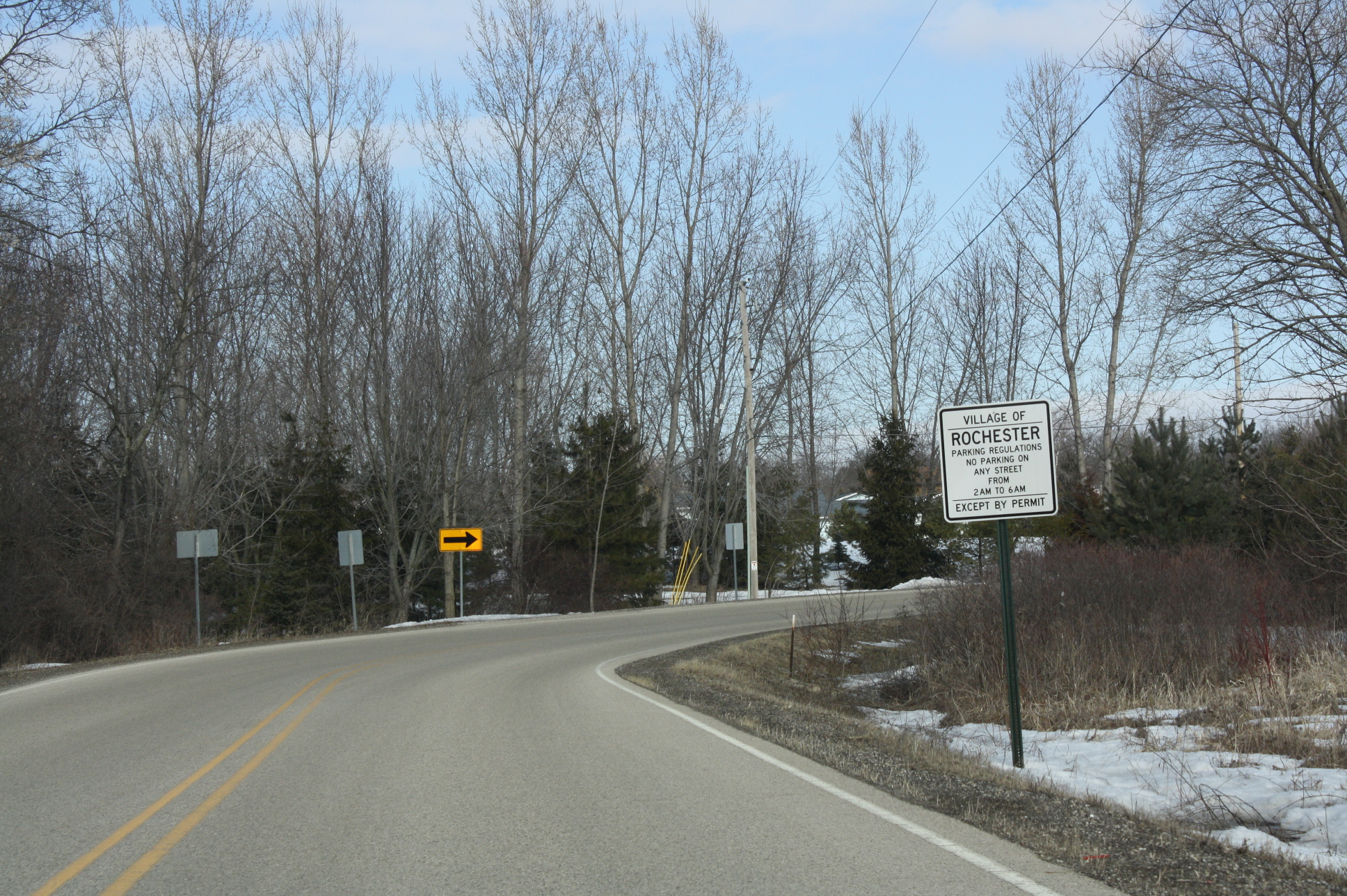
Sign entering Rochester

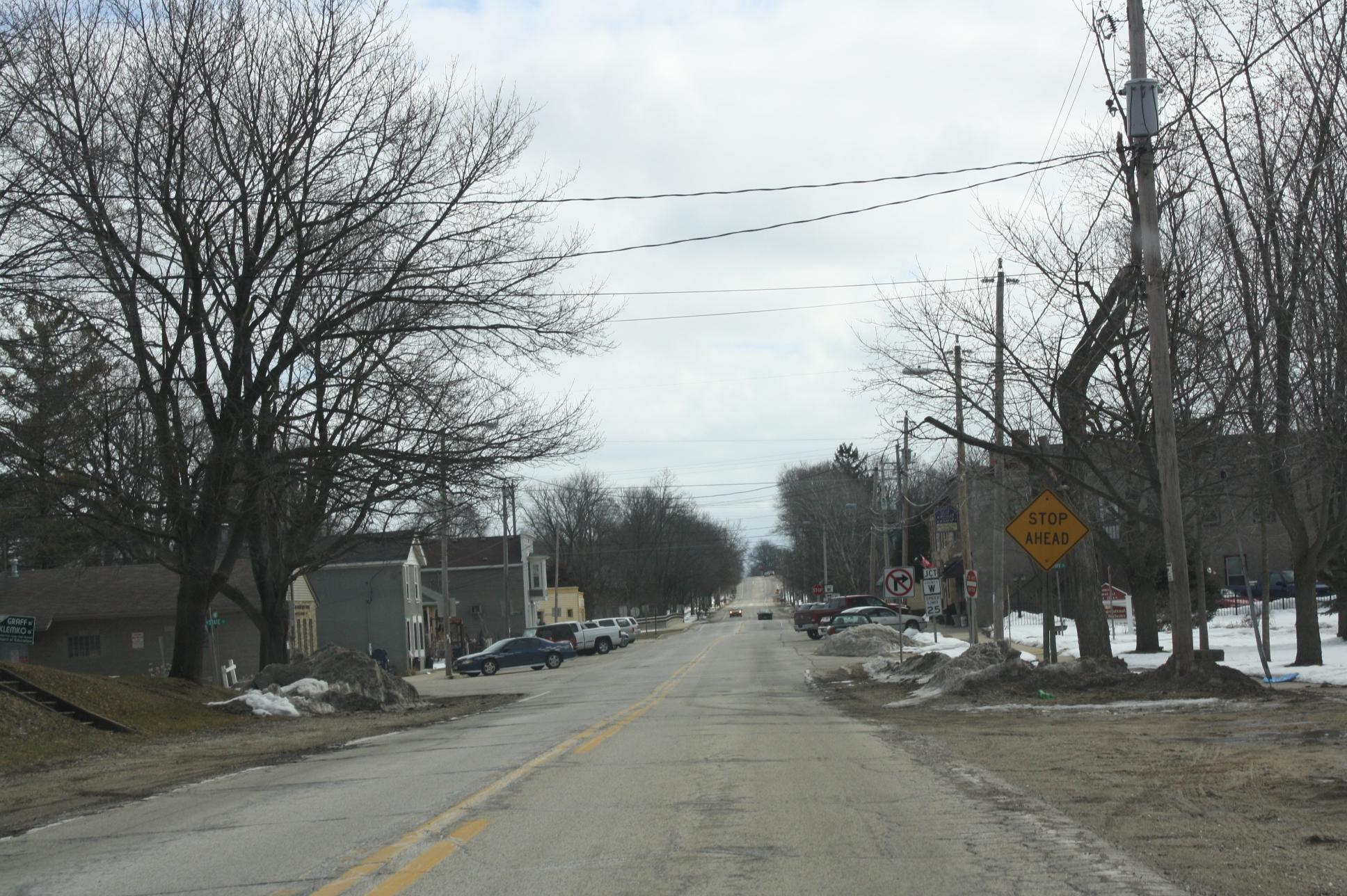
Looking east in downtown Rochester
