= Cornelia Barns =

American painter, illustrator, cartoonist (1888–1941)

- Born: Cornelia Baxter Barns; September 25, 1888; Flushing, New York, U.S.
- Died: November 4, 1941 (aged 53); Los Gatos, California, U.S.
- Education: Philadelphia Academy of Fine Arts
- Occupations: Visual artist, illustrator
- Years active: 1910–1941
- Employer(s): Oakland Post Enquirer, Sunset Magazine
- Known for: Illustrations for The Masses, art editor for Birth Control Review
- Notable work: Suffrage cartoons, birth control cartoons, socialist cartoons, "My City Oakland" column
- Spouse: Arthur Selwyn Garbett
- Children: 1
- Parent(s): Charles Edward Barns and Mabel Balston Barns

Cornelia Baxter Barns (September 25, 1888 – November 4, 1941) was an American illustrator, political cartoonist, painter, feminist, and socialist.

== Early life ==
Barns was born on September 25, 1888 in Flushing, New York to Charles Edward Barns and Mabel Balston Barns, the eldest of three children. Charles Barns initially entered law school, but then explored the sciences before launching a career as a newspaperman for the New York Herald. While living in New York, she earned a reputation as an author and poet. By 1910, the family had relocated to Philadelphia, where her father established himself as a theater manager and Cornelia studied art.

== Career ==
As educational opportunities expanded in the 19th century, women artists joined professional enterprises and founded their own art associations. Artwork made by women was considered inferior. To help overcome that stereotype, women became "increasingly vocal and confident" in promoting women's work, and thus became part of the emerging image of the educated, modern, and freer "New Woman." Artists "played crucial roles in representing the New Woman, both by drawing images of the icon and exemplifying this emerging type through their own lives."

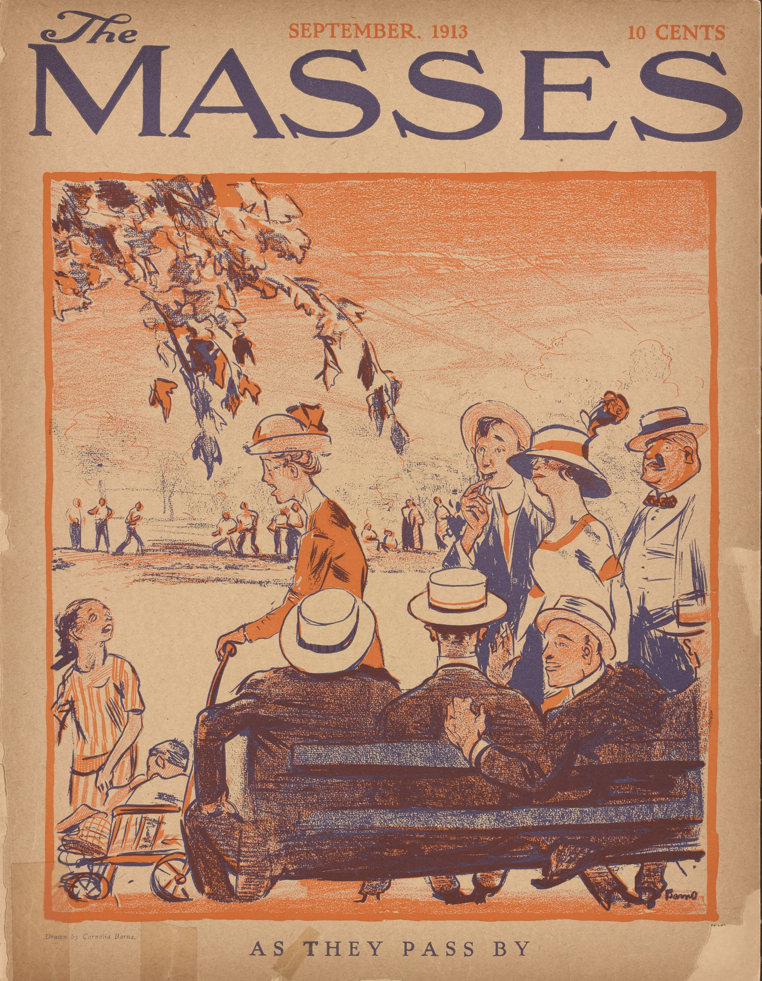
"As They Pass By," cover by Cornelia Barns.The Masses, September 1913.

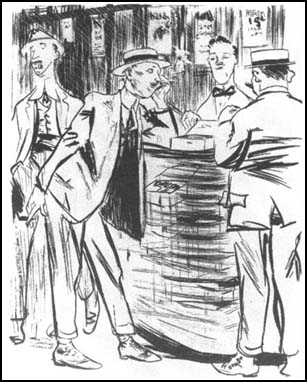
Cartoon by Cornelia Barns. "United We Stand: Anti-Suffrage Meeting," March 1914. Published in The Masses.

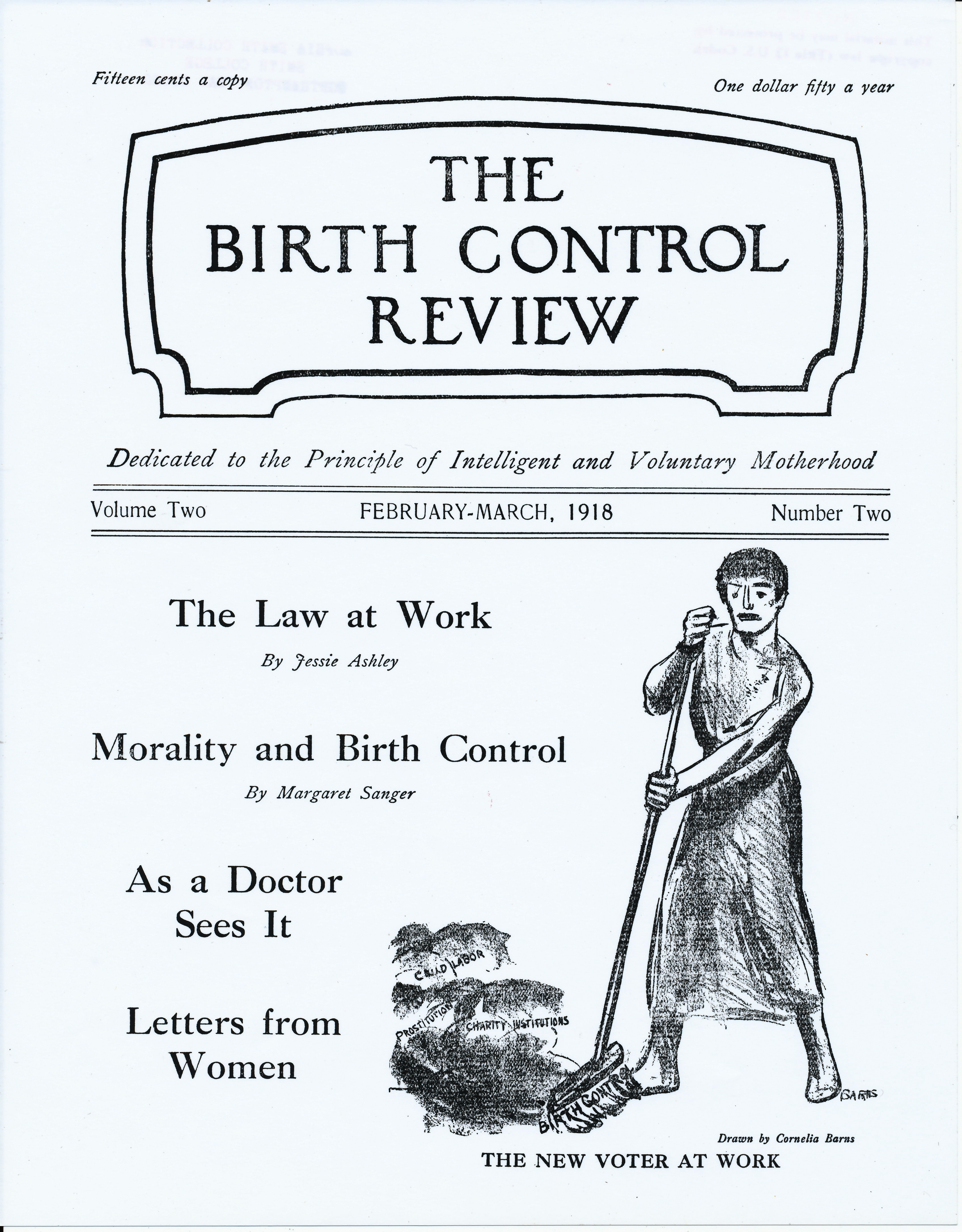
Cover of Birth Control Review, February–March 1918 with cartoon image by Cornelia Barns, "The New Voter at Work."

Barns enrolled at The Pennsylvania Academy of Fine Arts in 1906, where she became a pupil of William Merritt Chase and John Twachtman. She has also been mentioned as an associate of Robert Henri and his Ashcan School. Barns was honored by two Cresson Traveling Scholarships from the academy, which funded her first trip to Europe in 1910 and a second in 1913.

Barns exhibited her work at The Pennsylvania Academy of Fine Arts, and by 1910 was listed as a painter in American Art Annual. In her mid-twenties she married Arthur S. Garbett, a British music critic working in Philadelphia. The couple had a son in Philadelphia, with whom they also spent some years in New York City.

Max Eastman recalled an incident from his early days as editor of The Masses, around 1913.

"Cornelia Barns, an elf-eyed girl with smooth brown hair, turned up with the picture that was brilliantly comic and not like anything else in the world."

In another work, Eastman wrote:

"[T]he drawings of Art Young and Cornelia Barns and William Gropper were of their own intrinsic nature comic. Captions here were unnecessary, or were at least a supplemental element––often, in fact, supplied by the editors in the office."

In 1915, Barns was one of the 23 featured artists at "American Salon of Humorists," an exhibit organized by Louis Baury at the Folsom Galleries in New York City.

== Political life ==
From 1913 to 1917, Barns was a frequent contributor to The Masses, a socialist magazine that featured several notable writers and artists. For three years, Barns served on its editorial board. As art historian Rebecca Zurier commented,

"The closest thing to a feminist statement by a woman Masses editor appears in the cartoons of Cornelia Barns, who refrained from any serious social analysis."

When publication of The Masses was suspended following government charges, a new magazine, The Liberator, was founded by Max Eastman and Crystal Eastman. In the February 10, 1918 issue of the New York Call, Barns was announced as a contributing editor to The Liberator, along with fellow cartoonists and illustrators Robert Minor, Boardman Robinson and Art Young. In 1925, the New Masses was announced as "A new radical magazine of arts and letters, without political affiliations or obligations but with sympathy and allegiance unqualifiedly with the international labor movement..." Barns was listed as a contributing editor.

Within socialist periodicals, many cartoons by Cornelia Barns pertained to the topic of women's suffrage and gender equality. She also published cartoons in the suffrage magazines, including New York City's Woman Voter and the National Woman's Party's Suffragist. "One Man--One Vote" depicted two immigrant women with young children, juxtaposed with the stare of a male dandy in a three-piece suit, holding a walking stick. Her cover, "Waiting," published in The Suffragist in 1919, is a powerful portrayal of an unending mass of strong-bodied women, two with babies in their arms, holding a lighted torch while waiting for political recognition through suffrage.

In 1918, in its second year of publication, Margaret Sanger's Birth Control Review listed Cornelia Barns and Lou Rogers as art editors. Barns' earliest contribution was "We Accuse Society."

== Later life and death ==
In 1920, Cornelia Barns moved to California with her husband, Arthur Selwyn Garbett, and their young son. They settled on a ranch near her parents, who had moved to Morgan Hill several years earlier. Seeking job opportunities, the Garbetts next moved to Berkeley. Garbett became a radio station program director, later hosting his own radio program. He also served as music critic for a San Francisco newspaper. Barns worked as an illustrator, providing sketches and covers for Sunset magazine by 1921. She contributed a feature column for the Oakland Tribune, "My City Oakland." Garbett and Barns retired to Los Gatos, California, shortly before Barns' death from tuberculosis in November 1941. It was speculated that years of using etching acids on zinc plates in poorly ventilated studios had damaged her lungs. Others have noted that her paternal grandmother and great-aunt both succumbed to the disease. Following a flood in the family dwelling, few of her original artworks survive.
