= James Tinker =

American politician (1817–1886)

James Tinker (April 11, 1817 – February 20, 1886) was an American farmer from Rochester, Wisconsin who served a single one-year term as a Free Soil Party member of the Wisconsin State Assembly, in 1851, from Racine County as well as holding a variety of local offices.

== Background ==
Tinker was born near Huddersfield, England. He married Jane McMillan on December 23, 1838. He and his wife emigrated to the United States, and came to live in an area in western Racine County near the boundaries of Rochester, Dover and Burlington townships known as the "English Settlement". James is recorded as having been a colleague back in England of the famed temperance orator John Hockings, the "Birmingham Blacksmith" and they were chosen to go to England in 1851 to represent Wisconsin at The Great Exhibition, the 1851 London World's Fair. Tinker died of stomach cancer in Racine on February 20, 1886.

== Public office and politics ==
Tinker held local offices such as tax collector and town magistrate before being elected in 1850 as a Free Soil member of the Assembly for the third Racine County district (Towns of Burlington and Rochester) (Racine County dropped from five Assembly seats to three with that election, so it is difficult to argue that he succeeded any particular incumbent). He was succeeded in the next Assembly by James Catton, a Whig.

When on March 13, 1854, a public meeting was held in the English Settlement meetinghouse to discuss the Kansas-Nebraska Act, Tinker was appointed president of the meeting (John Hockings was one of the speakers). The meeting unanimously passed resolutions opposing passage of the bill and opposing further extension of slavery.

On October 14, 1854, Tinker was among the Rochester delegates to the Racine County convention of the new Republican Party.

He continued to hold local offices: in 1857 through 1860, he was Racine County Treasurer. In 1871, he was Assessor for the City of Racine. In 1872, he was on the county's Immigration Committee appointed by the state Commissioner of Immigration; in 1875-76, he was County Clerk

== Temperance movement ==
Tinker continued to be active in the temperance movement, serving as a delegate to or officer of various Racine-area conferences and meetings.
