= Robert W. Monk =

American politician

Robert W. Monk (March 28, 1866 – March 17, 1924) was an American physician and politician.

Born near Fond du Lac, Wisconsin, Monk moved to Sheboygan County, Wisconsin with his parents in 1868, where he attended public schools and a local commercial college. Monk then worked for railroad and express companies in Menasha, Wisconsin. He moved to St. Cloud, Calumet County, Wisconsin and was in the general merchandise business. He sold the business, went to Northwestern University Medical School (now Feinberg School of Medicine) and graduated in 1894. Monk practiced medicine in St. Cloud, Wisconsin and then moved to Chilton, Wisconsin and continued to practice medicine. During that time Monk served as mayor of Chilton, Wisconsin and also served on the Calumet County Board of Supervisors. Monk then went to Chicago, Illinois and took post graduate study in medicine for one year. In 1906, Monk moved to Neillsville, Wisconsin and continued to practice medicine. From 1913 to 1917, Monk served in the Wisconsin State Senate and was a member of the Republican party. Monk was then elected mayor of Neillsville and was in office until his death. Monk died at his home in Neillsville, Wisconsin of pernicious anemia.
