= Samuel E. Chapman =

Wisconsin State Assembly member

Samuel E. Chapman was a member of the Wisconsin State Assembly during the 1848 and 1861 sessions. Other positions he held include justice of the peace. Originally serving as a Whig, he later became a Republican.
