= Don Vruwink =

21st century American politician (born 1952)

Wisconsin Commissioner of Railroads
- Incumbent
- Assumed office April 7, 2023
- Governor: Tony Evers
- Preceded by: Yash Wadhwa

Member of the Wisconsin State Assembly from the 43rd district
- In office January 3, 2017 – January 2, 2023
- Preceded by: Andy Jorgensen
- Succeeded by: Jenna Jacobson

Personal details
- Born: June 12, 1952 (age 74) Auburndale, Wisconsin, U.S.
- Party: Democratic
- Spouse: Beth Jean Virgil (m. 1978)
- Children: 1
- Relatives: Amy Sue Vruwink (cousin)
- Education
- Occupation: Educator, politician

Donald James Vruwink (born June 12, 1952) is an American educator and Democratic politician from Rock County, Wisconsin. He is the current Wisconsin commissioner of railroads, appointed by governor Tony Evers in 2023. He previously served three terms in the Wisconsin State Assembly, representing the 43rd Assembly district from 2017 to 2023, and served on the city council and school board of Milton, Wisconsin.

== Early life and education ==
Don Vruwink was born in Auburndale, Wisconsin, and raised on his family's dairy farm near Auburndale. He graduated from Auburndale High School in 1970, and went on to attend the University of Wisconsin–Stevens Point. Vruwink was a popular local baseball pitcher, and was part of the Auburndale High School team which won the Wisconsin Interscholastic Athletic Association state championship in 1970, and continued playing at UW–Stevens Point. He earned his bachelor's degree in social studies and political science in 1975, with a minor in coaching. He went to work teaching at Bowler High School in Bowler, Wisconsin, where he also coached their baseball and football teams.

About 1980, he moved to Milton, Wisconsin, where he remained for the rest of his teaching career. He taught history for the next 30 years at Milton High School, and coached football, baseball, and softball. While teaching, he continued his own education at University of Wisconsin–Whitewater, earning his M.A. in history in 1986. Since retiring from teaching in 2011, Vruwink continued to work as a substitute teacher, and as a baseball and softball umpire.

== Political career ==
During his teaching career, Vruwink was appointed director of the Parks & Recreation department of the city of Milton. He made his first bid for elected office in 2011, when he ran for and won a seat on the Milton city council. He served on the city council until 2015, and served as president of the city council in 2015. In 2016 he was elected to a three-year term on the Milton School Board.

Around the same time Vruwink was elected to the school board, state representative Andy Jorgensen announced he would not run for re-election to the Wisconsin State Assembly in 2016. Vruwink decided to enter the race to succeed him in the 43rd Assembly district, but faced a primary against then-mayor of Milton Anissa Welch. Vruwink campaigned extensively throughout the district, which then comprised much of central and northern Rock County—excluding the city of Janesville—and parts of Dane, Jefferson, and Walworth counties, including the city of Whitewater, Wisconsin. He won the primary by 831 votes. In the general election, he defeated Republican Alison Hetz, taking 54% of the vote. Vruwink won re-election twice in that district, serving until 2023. In the Assembly, Vruwink served on the committees on agriculture, education, rural development, and tourism. He was also appointed to Governor Tony Evers' Dairy Task Force 2.0.

After the 2020 U.S. census, the Wisconsin Legislature failed to pass a redistricting plan, unable to find compromise between the Republican legislative majority and the Democratic governor. The conservative majority on the Wisconsin Supreme Court took jurisdiction of the case and imposed the Republicans' preferred legislative map, as Republicans sought to reach for legislative super-majorities through maximal gerrymandering. Vruwink's district was significantly affected by the changes; he was drawn out of the 43rd district and drawn into the 33rd district, which stretched from the outskirts of Janesville across the southern half of Jefferson County. The new district contained almost none of Vruwink's previous constituents. His Republican opponent was Jefferson County farm consultant Scott Johnson. The election in the 33rd district was the closest race in the state that year, Johnson prevailed by 247 votes.

A few months after the 2022 election, Governor Tony Evers appointed Vruwink to serve a six-year term as Commissioner of Railroads.

== Personal life and family ==
Don Vruwink is one of six children born to Donald Lewis Vruwink and his wife Helen (née Ashbeck). The elder Donald Vruwink owned a farm in the town of Milladore, and served as town assessor; he also served as treasurer of the National Farmers Organization. Amy Sue Vruwink, who also served in the Wisconsin State Assembly, is a first cousin of Don.

Don Vruwink married Beth Jean Virgil on November 25, 1978, at St. Paul's Lutheran Church in Bangor, Wisconsin. They have one adult son.

== Electoral history ==
=== Wisconsin Assembly, 43rd district (2016, 2018, 2020) ===
Year	Election	Date	Elected				Defeated				Total	Plurality
2016	Primary	Aug. 9	Don Vruwink	Democratic	3,038	57.92%	Anissa M. Welch	Dem.	2,207	42.08%	5,245	831
2016	General	Nov. 8	Don Vruwink	Democratic	16,179	54.56%	Allison Hetz	Rep.	13,427	45.28%	29,651	2,752
2018	General	Nov. 6	Don Vruwink (inc)	Democratic	16,241	61.14%	Gabriel Szerlong	Rep.	10,288	38.73%	26,564	5,953
2020	General	Nov. 3	Don Vruwink (inc)	Democratic	17,643	55.24%	Beth Drew	Rep.	14,263	44.66%	31,939	3,380

=== Wisconsin Assembly, 33rd district (2022) ===
Year	Election	Date	Elected				Defeated				Total	Plurality
2022	General	Nov. 3	Scott Johnson	Republican	13,709	50.40%	Don Vruwink	Dem.	13,462	49.49%	27,202	247

Wisconsin State Assembly
Preceded by Andy Jorgensen	Member of the Wisconsin State Assembly from the 43rd district January 3, 2017 – January 2, 2023	Succeeded by Jenna Jacobson
Government offices
Preceded by Yash Wadhwa	Wisconsin Commissioner of Railroads; April 7, 2023 – present	Incumbent
