= Wisconsin's 70th Assembly district =

American legislative district in western Wisconsin

Wisconsin's 70th State Assembly district
- 2024 map defined in 2023 Wisc. Act 94; 2022 map defined in Johnson v. Wisconsin Elections Commission; 2011 map was defined in 2011 Wisc. Act 43
Assemblymember
| Nancy VanderMeer; R–Tomah |
since January 5, 2015 (11 years)
- Demographics: 88.72% White; 2.84% Black; 2.62% Hispanic; 0.99% Asian; 4.34% Native American; 0.16% Hawaiian/Pacific Islander
- Population (2020) • Voting age: 59,394; 46,063
- Website: Official website
- Notes: Western Wisconsin

The 70th Assembly district of Wisconsin is one of 99 districts in the Wisconsin State Assembly. Located in western Wisconsin, the district comprises all of Jackson County and most of Monroe County, along with part of southern Juneau County. It includes the cities of Black River Falls, Elroy, Mauston, New Lisbon, and Tomah, and the villages of Alma Center, Hixton, Hustler, Kendall, Melrose, Merrillan, Oakdale, Taylor, Warrens, Wilton, and Wyeville. The district also contains much of the land of the Fort McCoy U.S. Army installation. The district is represented by Republican Nancy VanderMeer, since January 2015.

The 70th Assembly district is located within Wisconsin's 24th Senate district, along with the 71st and 72nd Assembly districts.

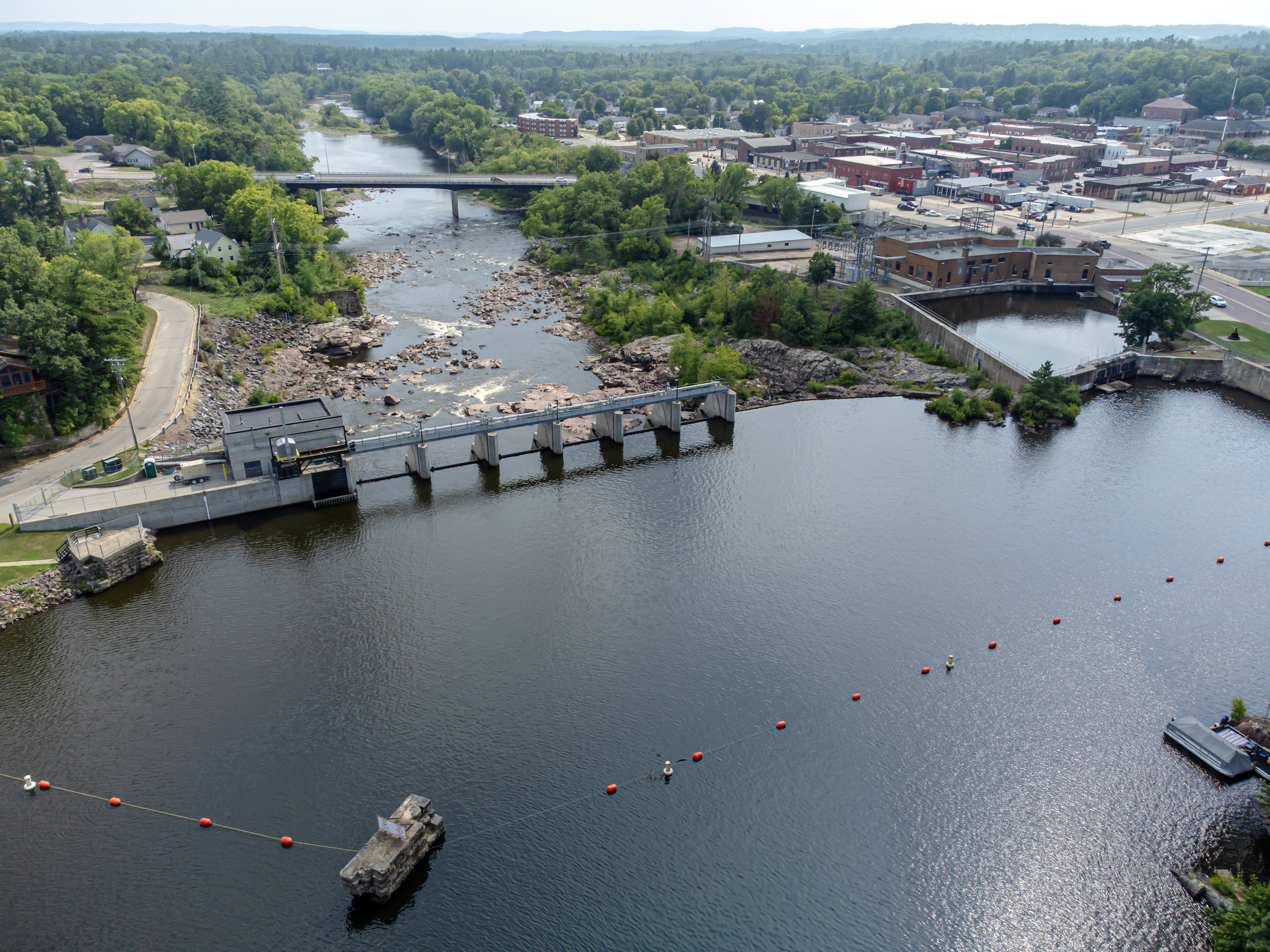
Dam and hydro plant at Black River Falls

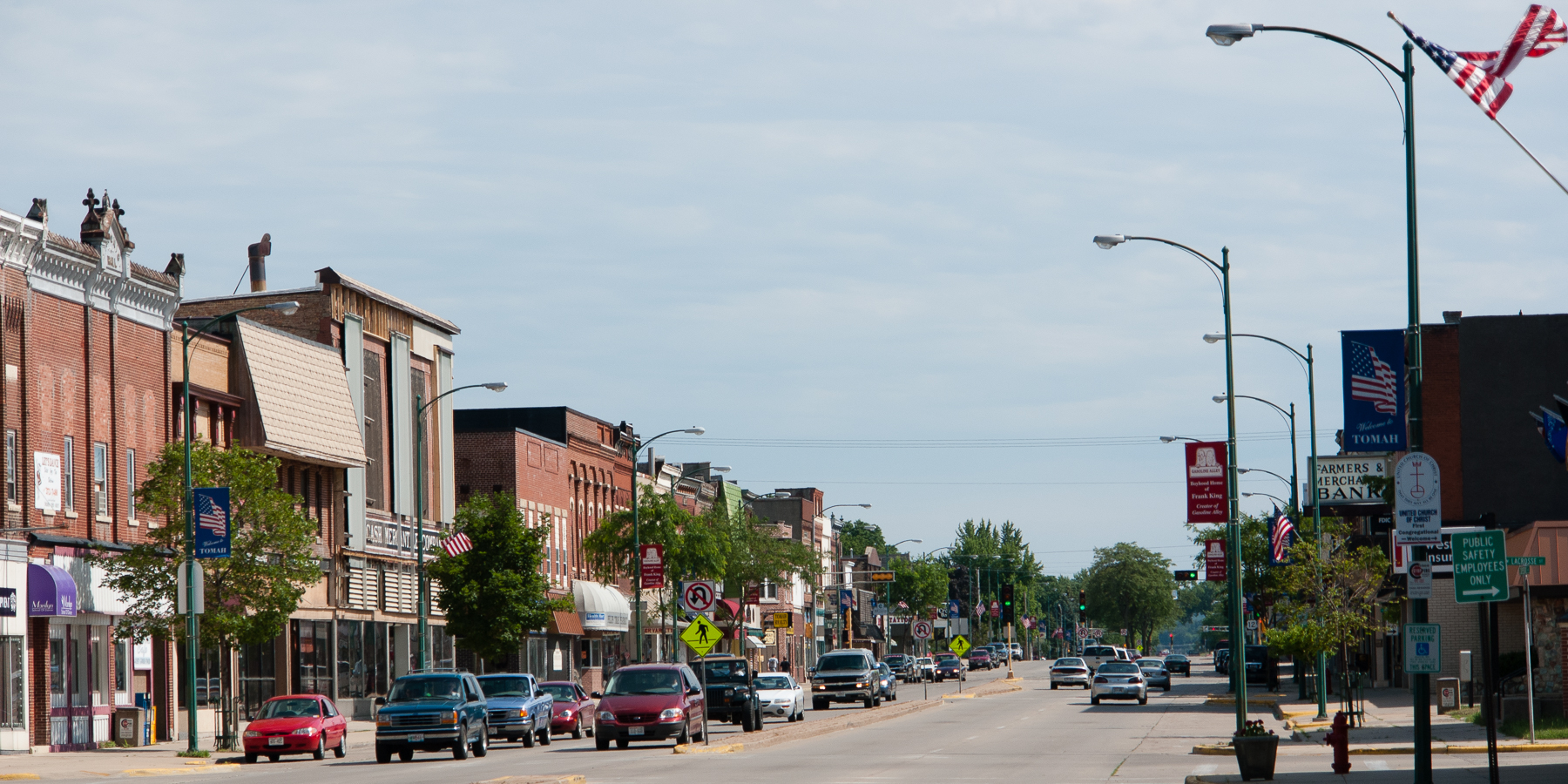
Downtown Tomah

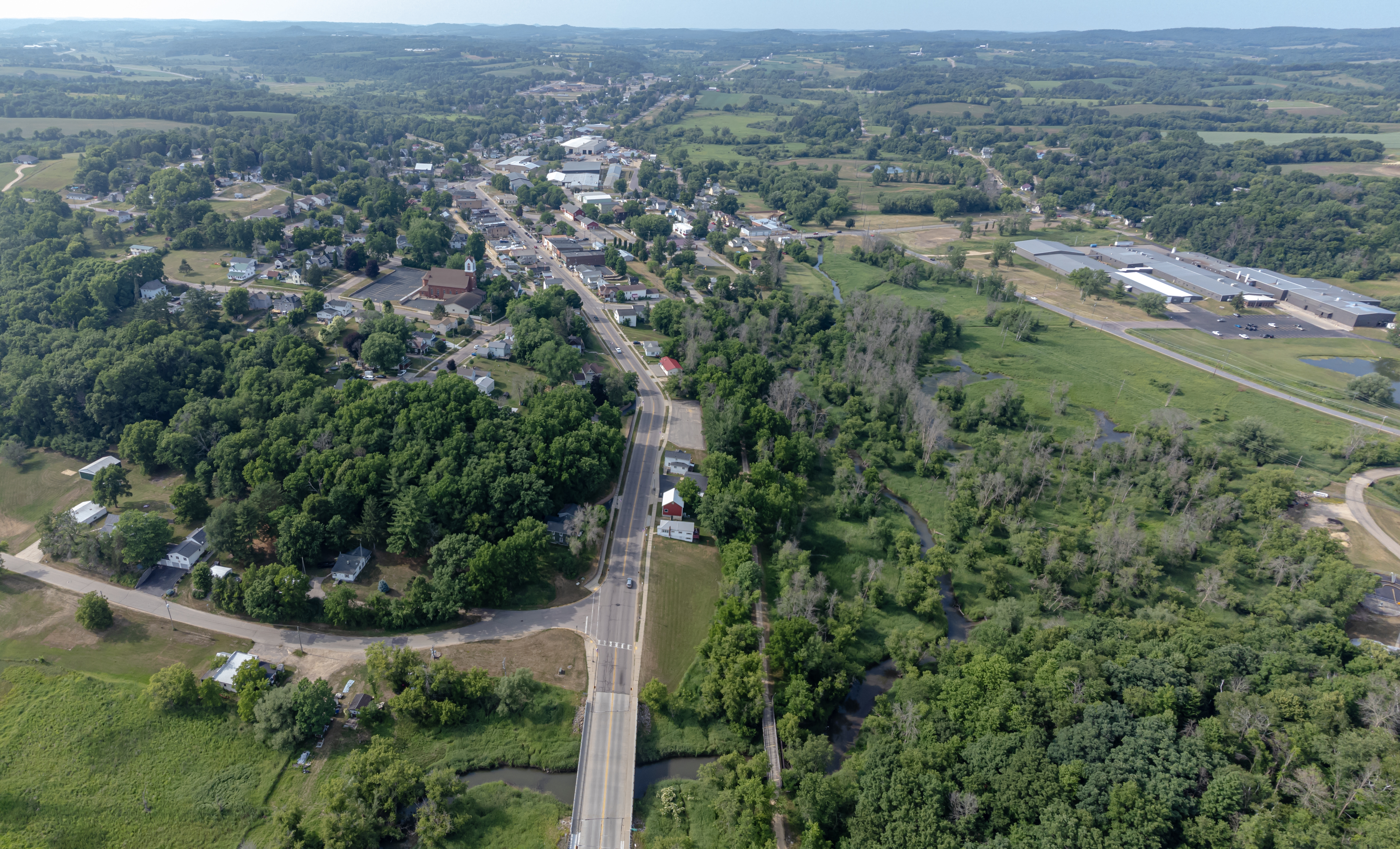
Elroy, Wisconsin

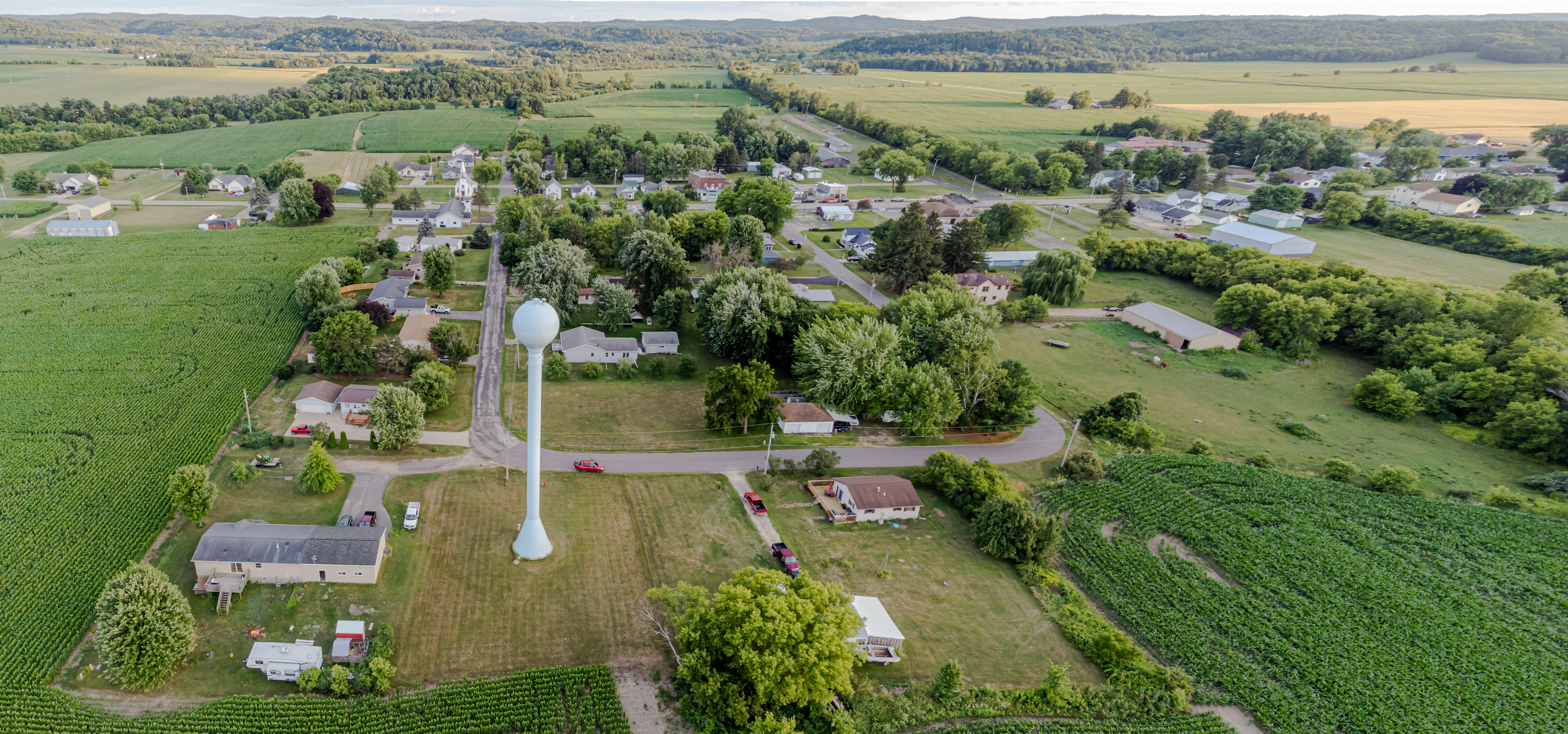
Hustler, Wisconsin

== List of past representatives ==
List of representatives to the Wisconsin State Assembly from the 70th district
| Member | Party | Residence | Counties represented | Term start | Term end | Ref. |
|---|---|---|---|---|---|---|
District created
| John Oestreicher | Dem. | Marshfield | Clark, Marathon, Portage, Wood | January 1, 1973 | January 6, 1975 | |
| Donald W. Hasenohrl | Dem. | Pittsville | Clark, Marathon, Portage, Wood | January 6, 1975 | January 3, 1983 | |
| John L. Merkt | Rep. | Mequon | Ozaukee, Washington | January 3, 1983 | January 7, 1985 | |
| Donald W. Hasenohrl | Dem. | Pittsville | Marathon, Portage, Wood | January 7, 1985 | January 1, 2001 | |
| Donald W. Hasenohrl | Dem. | Pittsville | Portage, Wood | January 7, 1985 | January 1, 2001 | |
| MaryAnn Lippert | Rep. | Pittsville | Portage, Wood | January 1, 2001 | January 6, 2003 | |
| Amy Sue Vruwink | Dem. | Milladore | Marathon, Portage, Wood | January 6, 2003 | January 5, 2015 | |
| Amy Sue Vruwink | Dem. | Milladore | Jackson, Monroe, Portage, Wood | January 6, 2003 | January 5, 2015 | |
| Nancy VanderMeer | Rep. | Tomah | Jackson, Monroe, Portage, Wood | January 5, 2015 | Current | |
| Nancy VanderMeer | Rep. | Tomah | Jackson, La Crosse, Monroe, Portage, Wood | January 5, 2015 | Current | |
| Nancy VanderMeer | Rep. | Tomah | Adams, Jackson, Monroe | January 5, 2015 | Current | |
