= Donald W. Hasenohrl =

American politician (1935–2024)

Member of the Wisconsin State Assembly
- In office January 7, 1985 – January 1, 2001
- Preceded by: John L. Merkt
- Succeeded by: MaryAnn Lippert
- Constituency: 70th district
- In office January 3, 1983 – January 7, 1985
- Preceded by: Donald K. Stitt
- Succeeded by: Susan Bowers Vergeront
- Constituency: 60th district
- In office January 3, 1975 – January 3, 1983
- Preceded by: John Oestreicher
- Succeeded by: John L. Merkt
- Constituency: 70th district

Personal details
- Born: Donald William Hasenohrl; November 25, 1935 Marshfield, Wisconsin, U.S.
- Died: January 3, 2024 (aged 88)
- Party: Democratic
- Spouse: Kathleen J. Stashek (m. 1961)
- Children: 3
- Profession: politician

Donald William Hasenohrl (November 25, 1935 – January 3, 2024) was an American politician and union steelworker. He was a member of the Wisconsin State Assembly for 26 years, representing his hometown, Marshfield, Wisconsin, and surrounding areas.

== Early life and career ==
Hasenohrl was born in Marshfield, Wisconsin, and graduated from Marshfield High School. Hasenohrl worked as a farmer in his youth and was employed by the Marshfield Fire Department as a firefighter in 1960 and 1961. He went on to work as a steel fabricator at the Felker Brothers Manufacturing Company in Marshfield until his election to the Assembly; he was a member of the local Boilermakers union and a delegate to the Marshfield Central Labor Council.

== Political career ==
As a young man, Hasenohrl became involved with the Democratic Party of Wisconsin and founded the Marshfield Young Democrats. He served as a field staffer for William Proxmire during his successful United States Senate campaigns in 1957 and 1958.

He made his first attempt at elected office in 1962, running for Wood County register of deeds against incumbent Robert J. Ryan, but Hasenohrl fell far short of his Republican opponent in the November general election. Nevertheless, a month later, in December 1962, he was elected chairman of the Wood County Democratic Party for 1963. He was subsequently reelected to another year as chairman in January 1964. He ran again for county office in 1964, running for county clerk; he was again defeated by the Republican incumbent.

After 1964, Hasenohrl stepped back from his attempts to seek office, but remained invested in local affairs and state politics. He became more involved with local labor organizations and was appointed to the Marshfield City Plan Commission. He and his wife continued to campaign in support of Democrats in the state, such as then-assemblymember Dave Obey and U.S. Senator Gaylord Nelson.

In 1974, a decade after his last election, he once again sought higher office. He announced a run for Wisconsin State Assembly in the 70th assembly district seat, which was being vacated by the incumbent John Oestreicher. At the time, the district comprised eastern Clark County, southern Marathon County, northeast Portage County, and northern Wood County. Several Democrats expressed interest in running for the now-open seat, but ultimately Hasenohrl faced only two opponents in the Democratic primary—Arlen K. Wanta, town chairman of Rudolph, Wisconsin, and Thomas F. Stockheimer, a supporter of the American Party who believed he'd have a better chance as a Democrat. Hasenohrl prevailed in the September primary with 57% of the vote. The November general election in the 70th assembly district produced the closest outcome in the state; Hasenohrl won the seat by a mere 42 votes.

Hasenohrl won reelection in 1976 by a wide margin, helped by a national Democratic wave against the Nixon-Ford years, but faced another difficult contest in 1978, winning by just 581 votes. Following 1978, Hasenohrl won comfortable reelection victories in 1980, 1982, 1984, and 1990, and was unopposed in 1986, 1988, and 1992.

Following close reelection contests in 1994 and 1998, Hasenohrl announced he would not seek a 14th term in 2000.

Hasenohrl served for several years on the committees on highways and transportation, serving as chairman of the transportation committee from 1983 through 1993; he also served for several sessions on the committees on rural development, rural affairs, and forestry. Hasenohrl enthusiastically supported his former legislative aide, Julie Lassa, when she ran for State Assembly in the neighboring 71st assembly district in 1998, and later when she ran for Wisconsin State Senate.

== Personal life and family ==
Donald Hasenohrl married Kathleen J. Stashek on May 13, 1961, in Wisconsin Rapids. His wife was a registered nurse and a teacher at Mid-State Technical College. They had three children, all of whom are now grown, and still reside in Pittsville, Wisconsin, just south of Marshfield.

Hasenohrl has been a member of the Fraternal Order of Eagles, the Benevolent and Protective Order of Elks, the Knights of Columbus, and was member and director of the Wisconsin State Fair Association.

Hasenohrl died on January 3, 2024, at the age of 88.

== Electoral history ==
=== Wood County Register of Deeds (1962) ===
Year	Election	Date	Elected				Defeated				Total	Plurality
1962	General	Nov. 6	Robert J. Ryan (inc)	Republican	11,929	66.40%	Donald W. Hasenohrl	Dem.	6,037	33.60%	17,966	5,892

=== Wood County Clerk (1964) ===
Year	Election	Date	Elected				Defeated				Total	Plurality
1964	General	Nov. 6	Adrian G. Elvod (inc)	Republican	12,609	56.09%	Donald W. Hasenohrl	Dem.	9,869	43.91%	22,478	2,740

=== Wisconsin Assembly (1974–1998) ===
Year	Election	Date	Elected				Defeated				Total	Plurality
1974	Primary	Sep. 10	Donald W. Hasenohrl	Democratic	1,352	57.58%	Arlen K. Wanta	Dem.	630	26.83%	2,348	722
1974	Primary	Sep. 10	Donald W. Hasenohrl	Democratic	1,352	57.58%	Thomas F. Stockheimer	Dem.	366	15.59%	2,348	722
1974	General	Nov. 5	Donald W. Hasenohrl	Democratic	5,962	50.18%	James S. Vedder	Rep.	5,920	49.82%	11,882	42
1976	General	Nov. 2	Donald W. Hasenohrl (inc)	Democratic	12,540	63.64%	Patricia A. Keith	Rep.	7,166	36.36%	19,706	5,374
1978	General	Nov. 7	Donald W. Hasenohrl (inc)	Democratic	7,675	51.97%	David L. Luepke	Rep.	7,094	48.03%	14,769	581
1980	General	Nov. 4	Donald W. Hasenohrl (inc)	Democratic	12,440	55.42%	David L. Luepke	Rep.	9,743	43.41%	22,446	2,697
1980	General	Nov. 4	Donald W. Hasenohrl (inc)	Democratic	12,440	55.42%	John S. Anderson	Lib.	263	1.17%	22,446	2,697
1982	General	Nov. 2	Donald W. Hasenohrl (inc)	Democratic	11,624	77.18%	Gary T. Hannemann	Rep.	3,436	22.82%	15,060	8,188
1984	General	Nov. 6	Donald W. Hasenohrl (inc)	Democratic	13,136	64.72%	Kenneth N. Machtan	Rep.	7,161	35.28%	20,297	5,975
1986	General	Nov. 4	Donald W. Hasenohrl (inc)	Democratic	10,953	100.00%	--Unopposed--				10,953	N/A
1988	General	Nov. 8	Donald W. Hasenohrl (inc)	Democratic	15,535	100.00%	--Unopposed--				15,535	N/A
1990	General	Nov. 6	Donald W. Hasenohrl (inc)	Democratic	8,805	69.70%	Jack Kelly	Rep.	3,828	30.30%	12,633	4,977
1992	General	Nov. 3	Donald W. Hasenohrl (inc)	Democratic	16,517	100.00%	--Unopposed--				16,517	N/A
1994	General	Nov. 8	Donald W. Hasenohrl (inc)	Democratic	8,193	51.01%	Donna M. Rozar	Rep.	7,526	46.86%	16,060	667
1994	General	Nov. 8	Donald W. Hasenohrl (inc)	Democratic	8,193	51.01%	Wayne Wiedeman	Tax.	341	2.12%	16,060	667
1996	General	Nov. 5	Donald W. Hasenohrl (inc)	Democratic	12,957	60.96%	Donna M. Rozar	Rep.	8,298	39.04%	21,255	4,659
1998	General	Nov. 3	Donald W. Hasenohrl (inc)	Democratic	8,906	51.50%	MaryAnn Lippert	Rep.	8,386	48.50%	17,292	520

Wisconsin State Assembly
Preceded by John Oestreicher	Member of the Wisconsin State Assembly from the 70th district January 3, 1975 – January 3, 1983	Succeeded by John L. Merkt
Preceded by Donald K. Stitt	Member of the Wisconsin State Assembly from the 60th district January 3, 1983 – January 7, 1985	Succeeded by Susan Bowers Vergeront
Preceded by John L. Merkt	Member of the Wisconsin State Assembly from the 70th district January 7, 1985 – January 1, 2001	Succeeded by MaryAnn Lippert
