= Sherry, Wisconsin =

Town of Sherry, Wisconsin
- Town
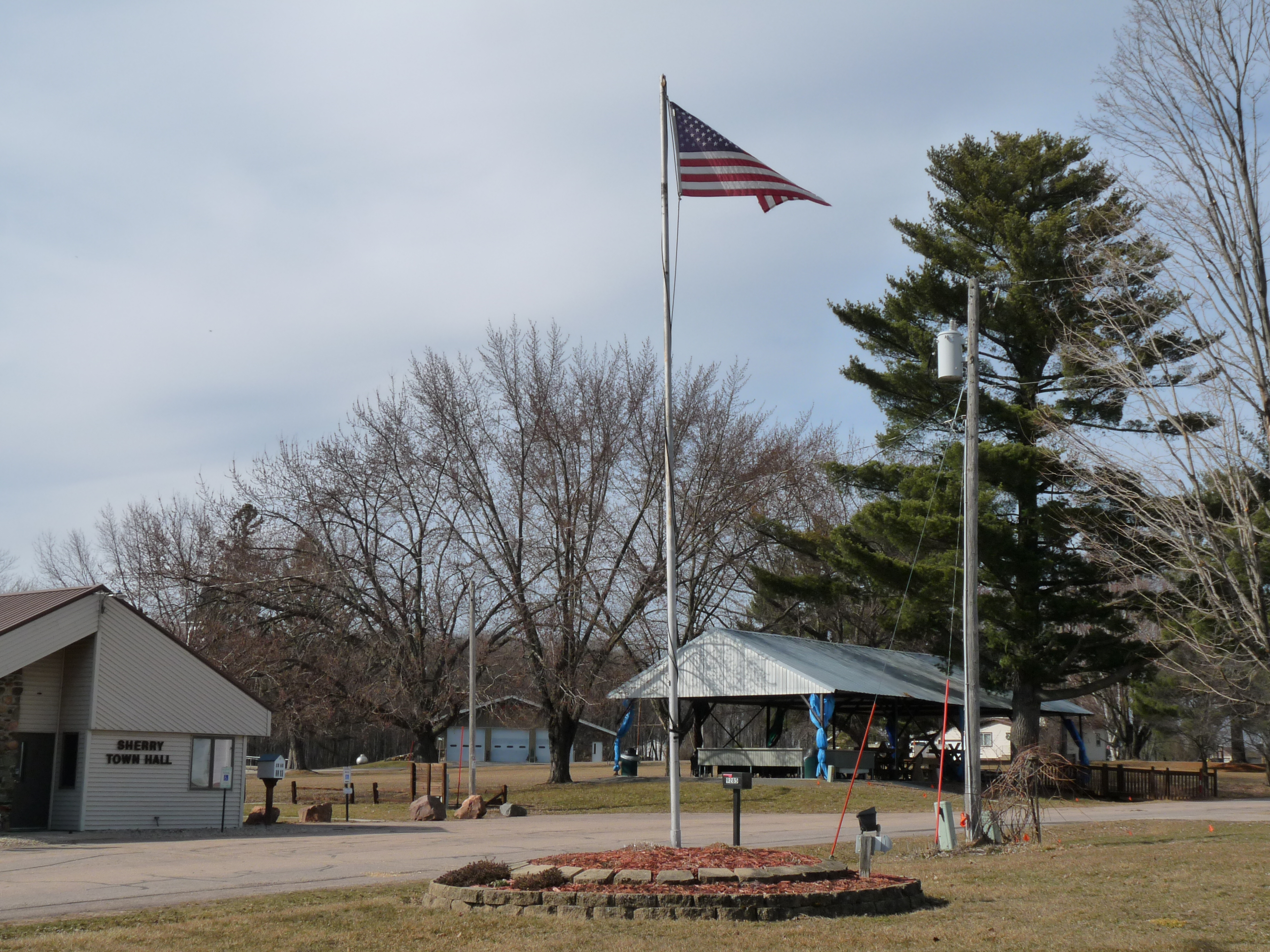
- Town hall and park in the hamlet of Sherry, in March

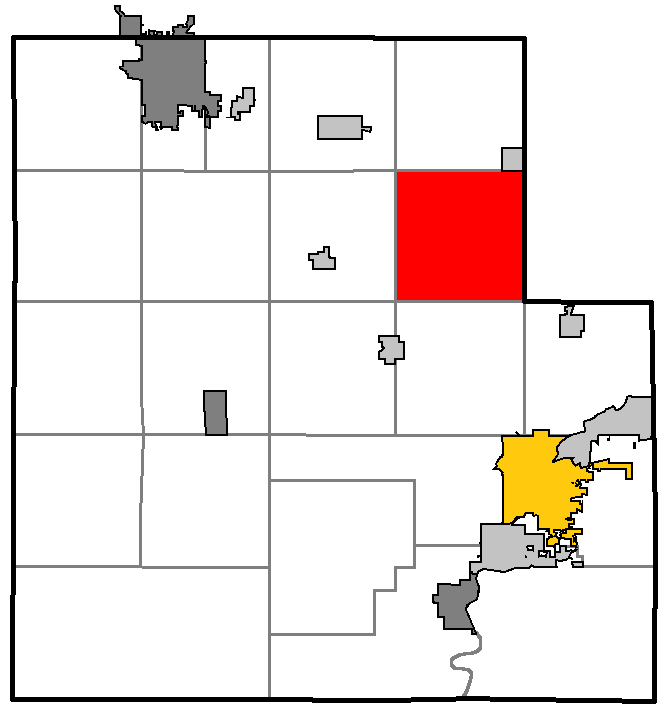
- Location of the Town of Sherry, Wood County

- Location of Wood County, Wisconsin
- Coordinates: 44°34′17″N 89°53′44″W
- Country: United States
- State: Wisconsin
- County: Wood

Area
  - Total: 35.4 sq mi (91.6 km^{2})
  - Land: 35.3 sq mi (91.3 km^{2})
  - Water: 0.12 sq mi (0.3 km^{2})
- Elevation: 1,171 ft (357 m)

Population (2020)
  - Total: 755
  - Density: 21.4/sq mi (8.27/km^{2})
- Time zone: UTC-6 (Central (CST))
  - Summer (DST): UTC-5 (CDT)
- Area codes: 715 & 534
- FIPS code: 55-73475
- GNIS feature ID: 1584149
- PLSS township: T24N R5E
- Website: https://townofsherry.wi.gov/

The Town of Sherry is located in Wood County, Wisconsin, United States. The population of the town was 755 at the 2020 census. The unincorporated community known as Sherry is located at the junction of County Highways N and F, 3.5 miles (5.6 km) west-southwest of Milladore., within the Town of Sherry.

== History ==
In June 1851 the outline of the six mile (10 km) square which later became the town of Sherry was surveyed by crews working for the U.S. government. In November 1853 another crew of surveyors found the section corners with chain and compass and marked them. When done, the deputy surveyor filed this general description:

This Township is heavily Timbered with Maple Oak Birch & Pine Maple Oak & Birch being the prevailing Kinds - along the Border(?) of Mill Creek there is some good scattering Pine - along the Border(?) of the small stream (?) almost invariably(?) find alder thickets caused by Beaver dams. - the streams are fed by the swamp, and are subject to very sudden rise & fall - the soil is a dark loam is well adapted for the purpose of agriculture. the Surface is generally level & is covered with stone the stone being of a reddish color

In 1880 Henry Sherry and a partner named Briggs started a sawmill on Mill Creek, with a company store, which attracted workers and grew into a community. With various partners, Sherry continued running the sawmill and added a planing mill and a factory that made barrel staves. The community also had a blacksmith in those early years. Sherry's first school was started in 1881. A post office called Sherry was established in 1884, and remained in operation until 1968.

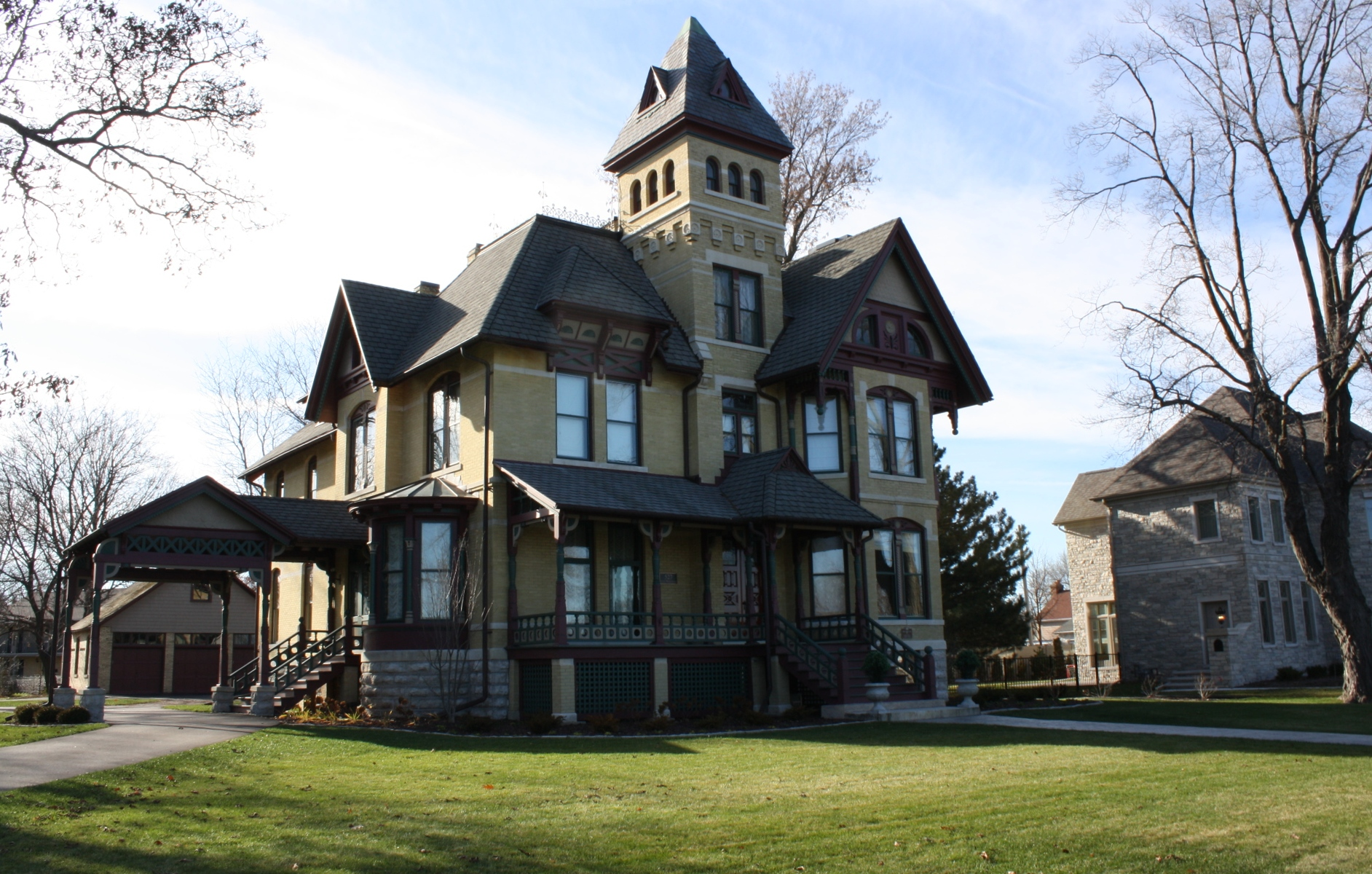
Henry Sherry's house in Neenah

Henry Sherry was not a local, but instead lived in Neenah. He was a flour miller's son who operated a sawmill there and ended up owning many sawmills in the 1880s along with the one in Sherry: Oshkosh, Fond du Lac, Centralia, Auburndale, Milladore, Vesper, Marshfield, Aniwa, Kent, Mineral Lake, and Park Falls.

The town (6x6 miles) of Sherry was established in 1885, taking its name from the community located within its borders.

The unincorporated community known as Sherry was platted in 1899.

Sherry's Presbyterian congregation formed around 1900 and built its brick church in 1903. The German Lutherans built their church one year later. In 1906 some Presbyterians started the Northwest Collegiate Institute, a Christian secondary school, on a 500-acre farm along Mill Creek. The students could work on the farm to pay their tuition. This school ran until 1921.

As of 1923, the village included two general stores, a hotel, a garage, a cheese factory, and a real estate office. A stage ran from Sherry village two miles to the railroad station at Blenker twice a day.

== Geography ==
According to the United States Census Bureau, the town has a total area of 35.4 square miles (91.6 km^{2}), of which 35.3 square miles (91.3 km^{2}) is land and 0.1 square mile (0.3 km^{2}) (0.34%) is water.

== Demographics ==
As of the census of 2000, there were 809 people, 270 households, and 217 families residing in the town. The population density was 22.9 people per square mile (8.9/km^{2}). There were 280 housing units at an average density of 7.9 per square mile (3.1/km^{2}). The racial makeup of the town was 96.79% White, 0.25% Native American, 1.36% Asian, 0.49% from other races, and 1.11% from two or more races. Hispanic or Latino of any race were 0.99% of the population.

There were 270 households, out of which 44.4% had children under the age of 18 living with them, 70.7% were married couples living together, 5.9% had a female householder with no husband present, and 19.3% were non-families. 14.8% of all households were made up of individuals, and 4.1% had someone living alone who was 65 years of age or older. The average household size was 3.00 and the average family size was 3.36.

In the town, the population was spread out, with 30.8% under the age of 18, 8.7% from 18 to 24, 30.7% from 25 to 44, 20.6% from 45 to 64, and 9.3% who were 65 years of age or older. The median age was 35 years. For every 100 females, there were 103.8 males. For every 100 females age 18 and over, there were 105.9 males.

The median income for a household in the town was $52,143, and the median income for a family was $53,036. Males had a median income of $33,250 versus $25,341 for females. The per capita income for the town was $17,728. About 1.8% of families and 2.3% of the population were below the poverty line, including 1.9% of those under age 18 and 2.6% of those age 65 or over.

== Notable people ==
- Herman Finger, entrepreneurial lumberman who worked for the Sherry Lumber Company
- Jacob J. Iverson, farmer, politician, and businessman, lived in the town
- Henry Sherry, the namesake of the town, and the owner of Henry Sherry House in Neenah and the Sherry Lumber Company
