= Nancy VanderMeer =

American businesswoman and politician

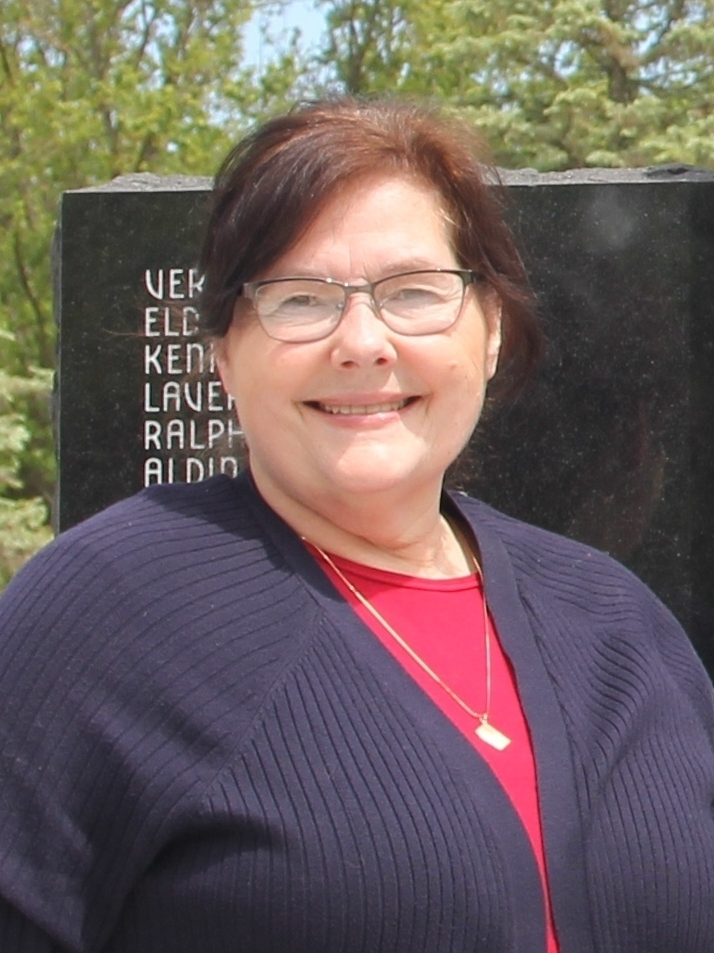
- VanderMeer in 2021

Member of the Wisconsin State Assembly from the 70th district
- Incumbent
- Assumed office January 5, 2015
- Preceded by: Amy Sue Vruwink

Personal details
- Born: December 15, 1958 (age 67)
- Education: University of Wisconsin–La Crosse (BS)

Nancy Lynn VanderMeer (born 1958) is an American businesswoman and politician from the Town of Greenfield, in Monroe County, Wisconsin, currently serving in the Wisconsin State Assembly.

== Public office ==
VanderMeer is a Republican. She ran in the 2012 election for Assembly district 70, winning the Republican primary in August, but losing to the Democratic incumbent, Amy Sue Vruwink, in the November general election. In 2014, VanderMeer was again the Republican nominee, and defeated Vruwink in the 70th district race.

== Personal life ==
VanderMeer received her bachelor's degree from University of Wisconsin–La Crosse and now owns her family's business, VanderMeer Motor Company. VanderMeer and her husband of over 20 years, David Hall, live on a dairy farm which has been in Hall's family for five generations. She is active in the local Lutheran Church.
