= Jacob J. Iverson =

American politician

Jacob John Iverson (March 6, 1850 – March 20, 1923) was an American businessman, farmer, and politician.

Iverson was born in the town of Wayne, Lafayette County, Wisconsin. His parents were immigrants from Norway in 1833 who settled to Wisconsin. Iverson was educated in the public schools in Lafayette County. From 1876 to 1883, Iverson lived in the state of Iowa. He then moved to South Wayne, Wisconsin where he was employed as a farmer. In 1893, Iverson served in the Wisconsin State Assembly representing Lafayette County as a Republican assemblyman. Later Iverson moved to the town of Sherry in Wood County, Wisconsin where he was engaged in the real estate and loan business.

He was married to Anne (Gardalen) Iverson (1854-1906). He died at his son's house in Sherry, Wisconsin, from the effects of flu and cancer.
