= Matt Hanutke =

High school and college wrestler

Personal information
- Born: 1972 (age 53–54) Milwaukee, Wisconsin, U.S.
- Education: Pittsville High School class of 1990; University of Wisconsin Bachelor of Science degree in Resource Management.
- Weight: High School 119 lb *College 118 lb

Matt Hanutke Pittsville, Wisconsin high school and college wrestler is one of only 18 wrestlers who have won four State individual titles. Hanutke was the first wrestler in Wisconsin state history to go undefeated through his entire high school career (117–0). He was a 4 time All-American (118 pounds) at the University of Wisconsin–Madison. In 2007 he was inducted into the Wisconsin Wrestling Hall of Fame.

== Education ==
- Pittsville High School class of 1990
- University of Wisconsin Bachelor of Science degree in Resource Management.

== Career ==
Hanutke was the first 4-year undefeated high school wrestler in the state of Wisconsin. He won four individual state titles. In his senior year he pinned Derrick Meyer in the title match at 119 pounds (class C).

He also wrestled in the first ever National High School Wrestling Championships held in 1990 at the University of Pittsburgh in Pennsylvania. He was defeated 9–6 in the 112 pound final by Bobby Young. He was a Big Ten wrestling champion in 1993. In 1994 he sustained a knee injury that caused him to miss part of his senior year.

In 2007 he was inducted into the Wisconsin Wrestling Hall of Fame.

=== Awards ===
- 4 time Individual State Champion Wrestler in Wisconsin 119
- 1990 Asics Tiger High School All-American Team (3rd Team)
- Big Ten Championship|Big Ten Champion
- 4 time All-American
- Wisconsin Wrestling Hall of Fame (2007)

== Personal ==
Matt Hanutke is married to Beth and lives in Chippewa Falls, WI. The couple has two sons. Hanutke works for Chippewa Falls Area Unified School District in Chippewa Falls, Wisconsin.

== Books ==
- Great Moments in Wisconsin Sports
- The Golden Era of Amateur Wrestling: 1980S
- On Wisconsin!: The History of Badger Athletics
