= John L. Merkt =

American politician

Member of the Wisconsin State Assembly
- In office January 7, 1985 – January 3, 1989
- Preceded by: David Helbach
- Succeeded by: Steven D. Loucks
- Constituency: 58th Assembly district
- In office January 3, 1983 – January 7, 1985
- Preceded by: Donald W. Hasenohrl
- Succeeded by: Donald W. Hasenohrl
- Constituency: 70th Assembly district
- In office January 3, 1977 – January 3, 1983
- Preceded by: Frederick C. Schroeder
- Succeeded by: Marcia P. Coggs
- Constituency: 12th Assembly district

Personal details
- Born: October 2, 1946 Milwaukee, Wisconsin, U.S.
- Died: April 1, 2009 (aged 62) Madison, Wisconsin, U.S.
- Party: Republican
- Spouses: Kimberly Winters (m. 1975; div. 1984); Nancy Lee Callaway (m. 1992–2009)
- Education: Marquette University; University of Wisconsin–La Crosse (BS)

John L. Merkt (October 2, 1946 – April 1, 2009) was an American educator and Republican politician from Mequon, Wisconsin. He served six terms in the Wisconsin State Assembly, from 1977 to 1989. He previously served as a local ward committeeman from 1974 to 1976.

== Biography ==
John L. Merkt was born in Milwaukee, Wisconsin. He was a graduate of Marquette University High School. He attended Marquette University from 1964 to 1968 and graduated with a Bachelor of Science degree in secondary education, from the University of Wisconsin–La Crosse in 1971. He married his first wife, Kimberly Winters, in 1975; they divorced in 1984. John was united in marriage to widow Nancy Callaway (née Crabb) on November 21, 1992, in the Wisconsin State Assembly chambers with 400 family and friends present to celebrate. Nancy Merkt died on May 18, 2023.

== Career ==
John Merkt was elected to the Wisconsin State Assembly in 1976 and served for over a decade. Among his efforts, Merkt worked to toughen seatbelt legislation and raise the minimum drinking age, from 18 to 19, and later to 21. He also worked to tighten laws and penalties regarding the sale or possession of drugs, especially cocaine; including tripling the mandatory sentence from 12 months' incarceration to 36 months' incarceration for those found guilty of possession or sales of cocaine within 500 feet (150 m) of a school zone. He also wrote Wisconsin's Len Bias Law, which makes providing drugs that prove fatal to be considered manslaughter.

After leaving office, Merkt worked in collaboration with Assembly speaker David Prosser Jr. and Governor Tommy Thompson in 1995, to push for the creation of Miller Park in Milwaukee.

== Death ==
A longtime sufferer of lupus, Merkt died of congestive heart failure at his home on April 1, 2009.
