= Wayne, Lafayette County, Wisconsin =

Wayne, Wisconsin
- Town
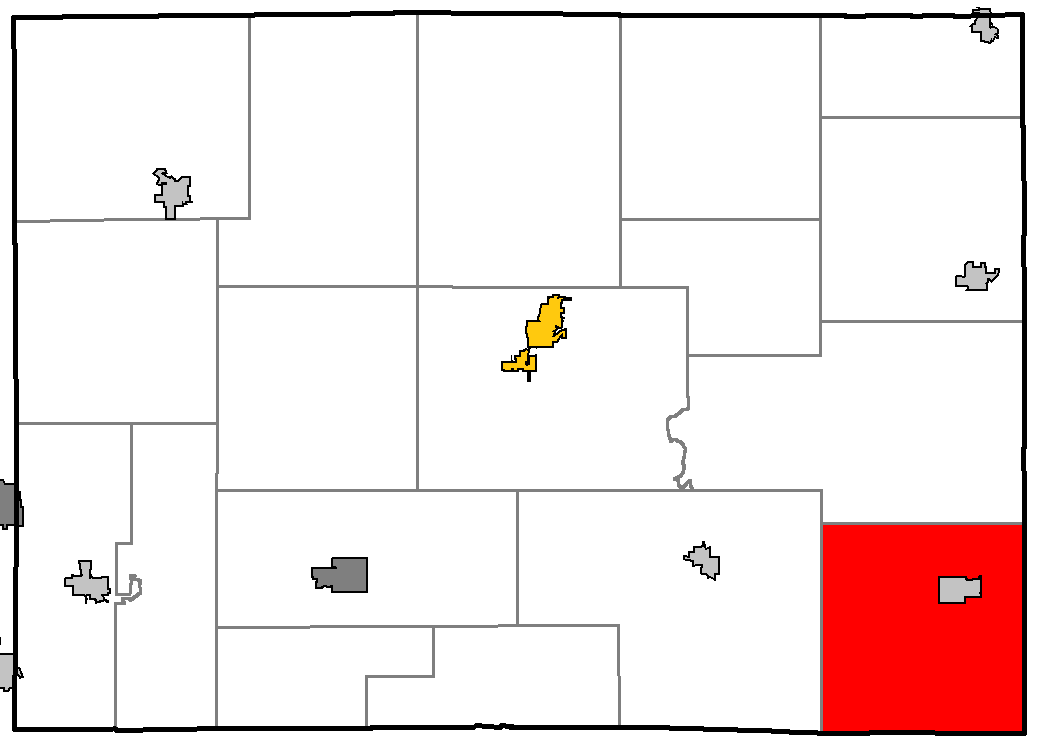
- Location of Wayne, within Lafayette County, Wisconsin

- Location of Lafayette County, Wisconsin
- Coordinates: 42°33′47″N 89°53′49″W
- Country: United States
- State: Wisconsin
- County: Lafayette

Area
  - Total: 36.74 sq mi (95.15 km^{2})
  - Land: 36.70 sq mi (95.06 km^{2})
  - Water: 0.035 sq mi (0.09 km^{2})
- Elevation: 833 ft (254 m)

Population (2020)
  - Total: 474
  - Density: 12.9/sq mi (4.99/km^{2})
- Time zone: UTC-6 (Central (CST))
  - Summer (DST): UTC-5 (CDT)
- ZIP Code: 53587 (South Wayne)
- Area code: 608
- FIPS code: 55-84850
- GNIS feature ID: 1584388

Wayne is a town in Lafayette County, Wisconsin, United States. The population was 474 at the 2020 census.

== History ==
The town was named in honor of "Mad" Anthony Wayne, a Revolutionary War general.

== Geography ==
The town occupies the southeastern corner of Lafayette County, and is bordered to the east by Green County and to the south by Jo Davies and Stephenson counties in Illinois. The village of South Wayne, a separate municipality, is surrounded by the northeastern part of the town.

According to the United States Census Bureau, the town of Wayne has a total area of 36.8 square miles (95.2 km^{2}), of which 0.03 square miles (0.09 km^{2}), or 0.10%, are water. The Pecatonica River, a tributary of the Rock River, flows from west to east across the northern part of the town.

== Demographics ==
Historical population
| Census | Pop. | Note | %± |
|---|---|---|---|
| 2000 | 496 | | — |
| 2010 | 490 | | −1.2% |
| 2020 | 474 | | −3.3% |

As of the census of 2000, there were 496 people, 176 households, and 139 families residing in the town. The population density was 13.5 people per square mile (5.2/km^{2}). There were 178 housing units at an average density of 4.8 per square mile (1.9/km^{2}). The racial makeup of the town was 100.00% White. Hispanic or Latino of any race were 1.41% of the population.

There were 176 households, out of which 38.6% had children under the age of 18 living with them, 67.6% were married couples living together, 6.3% had a female householder with no husband present, and 21.0% were non-families. 17.0% of all households were made up of individuals, and 5.1% had someone living alone who was 65 years of age or older. The average household size was 2.82 and the average family size was 3.17.

In the town, the population was spread out, with 27.8% under the age of 18, 8.5% from 18 to 24, 27.4% from 25 to 44, 27.0% from 45 to 64, and 9.3% who were 65 years of age or older. The median age was 38 years. For every 100 females, there were 118.5 males. For every 100 females age 18 and over, there were 113.1 males.

The median income for a household in the town was $44,821, and the median income for a family was $47,292. Males had a median income of $31,842 versus $21,417 for females. The per capita income for the town was $19,621. About 7.7% of families and 8.9% of the population were below the poverty line, including 15.2% of those under age 18 and none of those age 65 or over.

== Notable people ==
- Jacob J. Iverson, farmer, politician, and businessman, was born in the town
