= Amy Sue Vruwink =

21st century American politician (born 1975)

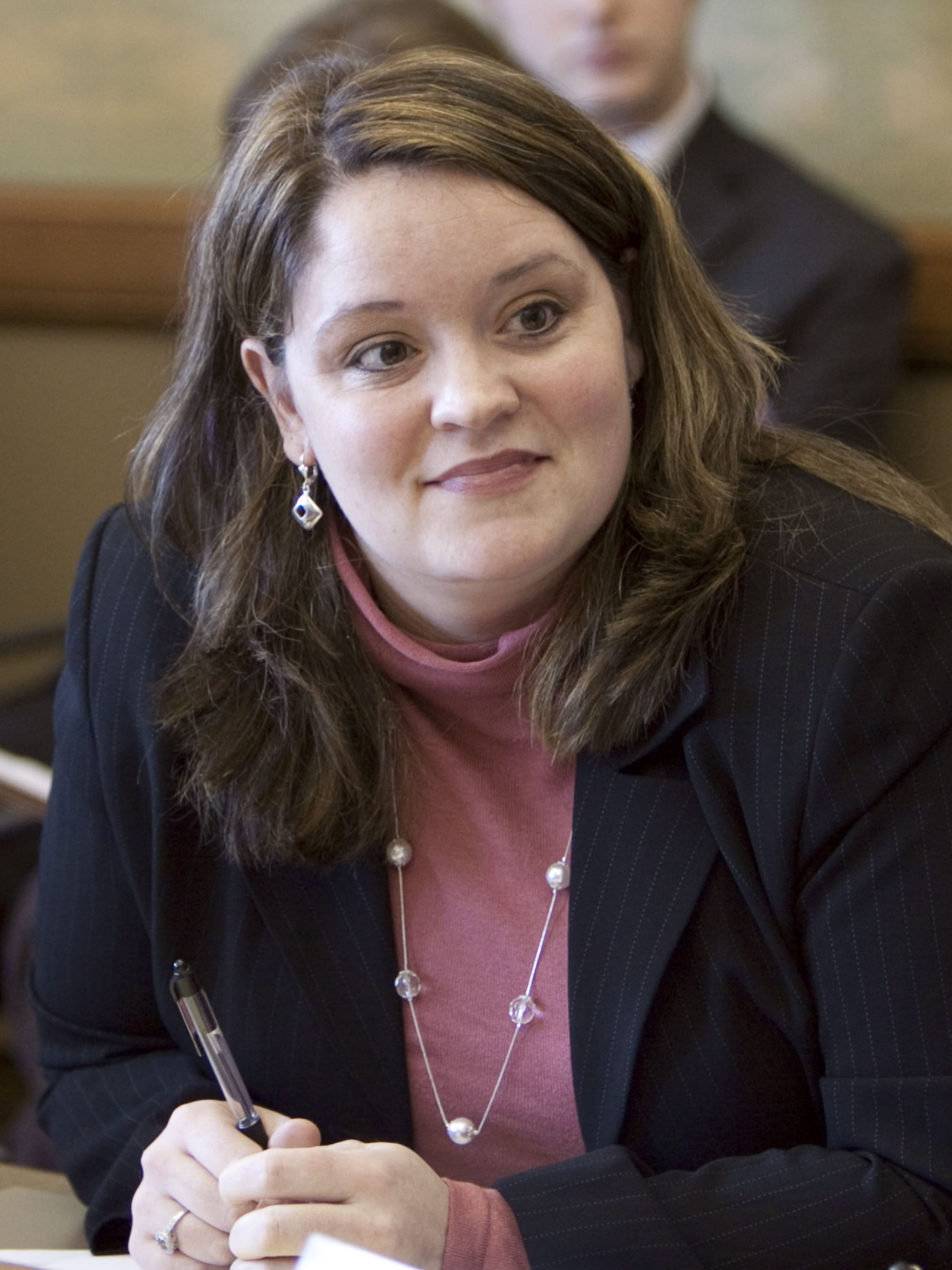
- Vruwink in 2009

Member of the Wisconsin State Assembly from the 70th district
- In office January 6, 2003 – January 5, 2015
- Preceded by: MaryAnn Lippert
- Succeeded by: Nancy L. VanderMeer

Personal details
- Born: May 22, 1975 (age 51) Wisconsin Rapids, Wisconsin, U.S.
- Party: Democratic
- Spouse: Matthew J. Crane (m. 2000)
- Children: 2
- Relatives: Don Vruwink (cousin)
- Education: Marian University
- Occupation: Farmer
- Website: Personal twitter

Amy Sue Vruwink (born May 22, 1975) is an American farmer and Democratic politician from Wood County, Wisconsin. She served 12 years in the Wisconsin State Assembly, representing Wisconsin's 70th Assembly district from 2003 to 2015. After leaving office, she worked as a district representative for U.S. representative Ron Kind from 2015 to 2023.

== Early life ==
Amy Sue Vruwink was born in Wisconsin Rapids, Wisconsin, on May 22, 1975. She was raised on her father's farm in the town of Sherry, Wisconsin, and graduated from Auburndale High School in neighboring Auburndale. She went on to attend Marian University, a Catholic private college in Fond du Lac, Wisconsin, and earned her bachelor's degree in communications in 1997. Throughout her early years, Vruwink was active in 4-H and Future Farmers of America.

During her sophomore year in college, in 1995, Vruwink was selected "Miss Farm Bureau" by the Wisconsin Farm Bureau Federation. As part of her activities as Miss Farm Bureau, Vruwink traveled to Washington, D.C., to lobby on behalf of agricultural interests. Her experience with the farm bureau led to interest in public service; she served an internship in the office of Wisconsin U.S. representative Dave Obey (D–Wausau), and was then hired as a district representative on his staff in 1998.

== Political career ==
Vruwink made her first run for public office at age 25 in 2000. She ran for Wisconsin State Assembly, seeking to challenge first-term incumbent Republican MaryAnn Lippert in the 70th Assembly district. At the time, the 70th district was almost entirely rural, comprising nearly all of Wood County except for the city of Wisconsin Rapids and the southeast corner of the county, along with much of northern Portage County around the city of Stevens Point; the largest population center in the district was the city of Marshfield. Before reaching the general election, Vruwink faced a contest for the Democratic Party nomination against Gary W. Morgan, a former radio reporter who was endorsed by long-time neighboring district representative Marlin Schneider. After a vigorous campaign, Vruwink won the primary in a landslide, taking 78% of the vote. In the general election, her race was one of the closest in the state, falling just 104 votes short of the incumbent, Lippert. Vruwink sought a recount, which changed the totals slightly, and brought her margin down to 96 votes.

After losing the election, Vruwink resumed her work on the staff of Dave Obey. Just over a year later, in the spring of 2002, Lippert announced that, due to her husband's health challenges, she would not run for a third term in the Assembly. Around the same time, Vruwink announced she planned to run again. Between the 2000 and 2002 elections, the state also underwent redistricting, but the 70th Assembly district was barely affected.

Vruwink faced a primary opponent again in 2002, but prevailed by a wide margin, taking 71% of the vote. In the general election, Vruwink's Republican opponent was Gary C. Meyer, a small business owner and high school classmate. Vruwink was the subject of a significant volume of policy-based attacks during the 2002 campaign, suggesting she would prioritize a Milwaukee highway project over a local highway, and questioning her position on abortion. There was also an attempt by Republicans to connect her to the recent "caucus scandal" in Madison, because she was one of several Assembly candidates who had received support from tainted third party PACs in the 2000 election. Despite the barrage of attacks, Vruwink won the election by healthy margin, receiving 54.5% of the vote.

After winning office, Vruwink won by large margins running for re-election in 2004, 2006, and 2008. She was assigned to the Assembly committee on agriculture and served on that committee for all of her years in the Assembly, rising to become chair of the committee during the 2009–2010 term. Following the 2008 election and the Great Recession, Republicans were buoyed by the Tea Party movement, a backlash against the new Democratic president Barack Obama and government spending. In the 2010 election, Vruwink was challenged by Republican John Spiros, a member of the Marshfield city council. Despite a Republican wave election, Vruwink still won her election with 53.7% of the vote.

The 2010 elections, however, ushered in full Republican control of Wisconsin state government. Republicans used their power to pass controversial legislation, including a dramatic new redistricting law now recognized as one of the most aggressive gerrymanders in American history. Vruwink's 70th Assembly district was significantly redrawn, removing Marshfield and areas of northwestern Wood County and adding a wide swath of eastern Jackson County and northwest Monroe County. In the 2012 election, she faced farmer and business owner Nancy VanderMeer of Monroe County. Vruwink won the election, but by the small margin of just 144 votes. After the 2012 election, Vruwink was named by her party's leadership to a coveted seat on the Legislature's budget-writing Joint Finance Committee. VanderMeer ran again in 2014, however, and this time defeated Vruwink in the lower turnout midterm election.

After leaving office, Vruwink returned to working as a congressional staffer, this time for U.S. representative Ron Kind (D–La Crosse). Vruwink was hired in January 2015 as Kind's district representative in the central Wisconsin portion of his 3rd congressional district. She continued working for Kind until he retired in January 2023.

== Personal life and family ==
Amy Sue Vruwink is one of eight children born to James T. Vruwink and his wife Donna (née Spranger). She is a first cousin of Don Vruwink, the current Wisconsin commissioner of railroads, who also previously served in the Wisconsin State Assembly.

On July 8, 2000, she married Matthew J. Crane at St. James Catholic Church, in Vesper, Wisconsin. They have two children together.

Her nephew, Zach Vruwink, served as mayor of Wisconsin Rapids, Wisconsin, from 2012 through 2020, and was the city's youngest ever mayor when he was first elected, at age 24.

== Electoral history ==
=== Wisconsin Assembly (2000–2014) ===
Year	Election	Date	Elected				Defeated				Total	Plurality
2000	Primary	Sep. 12	Amy Sue Vruwink	Democratic	2,705	78.73%	Gary W. Morgan	Dem.	730	21.25%	3,436	1,975
2000	General	Nov. 7	MaryAnn Lippert (inc)	Republican	12,071	50.17%	Amy Sue Vruwink	Dem.	11,975	49.77%	24,060	96
2002	Primary	Sep. 10	Amy Sue Vruwink	Democratic	5,337	71.36%	Trent T. Rasmussen	Dem.	2,141	28.63%	7,479	3,196
2002	General	Nov. 5	Amy Sue Vruwink	Democratic	9,207	53.56%	Gary C. Meyer	Rep.	7,953	46.27%	17,190	1,254
2004	General	Nov. 2	Amy Sue Vruwink (inc)	Democratic	18,120	63.03%	Daniel Mielke	Rep.	10,622	36.95%	28,747	7,498
2006	General	Nov. 7	Amy Sue Vruwink (inc)	Democratic	14,278	66.52%	Dennis Juncer	Rep.	7,180	33.45%	22,074	7,098
2008	General	Nov. 4	Amy Sue Vruwink (inc)	Democratic	19,490	69.62%	Dennis Seevers	Rep.	8,495	30.34%	27,995	10,995
2010	General	Nov. 2	Amy Sue Vruwink (inc)	Democratic	12,178	53.75%	John Spiros	Rep.	10,461	46.17%	22,658	1,717
2012	General	Nov. 6	Amy Sue Vruwink (inc)	Democratic	13,518	50.19%	Nancy VanderMeer	Rep.	13,374	49.65%	26,936	144
2014	General	Nov. 4	Nancy VanderMeer	Republican	11,766	52.78%	Amy Sue Vruwink (inc)	Dem.	10,508	47.14%	22,293	1,258

Wisconsin State Assembly
Preceded by MaryAnn Lippert	Member of the Wisconsin State Assembly from the 70th district January 6, 2003 – January 5, 2015	Succeeded by Nancy L. VanderMeer
