= MaryAnn Lippert =

American politician

MaryAnn T. Lippert (born December 21, 1953) is a Wisconsin health educator, health administrator, and Republican politician who served one term as a member of the Wisconsin State Assembly. She is currently retired from formal employment, but still active with strategies to move rural communities forward.

== Background ==
Born in Marshfield, Wisconsin, Lippert graduated from Pittsville High School. She received a B.S. from the University of Wisconsin–La Crosse in 1976 and an M.S. from the same university in 1980. She worked for many years as a health educator.

== Assembly ==
In 1998, she challenged fellow Pittsville resident and Democratic incumbent Donald W. Hasenohrl for the 70th Assembly District (portions of Portage and Wood counties) seat, coming close to defeating him (8,906 for Hasenohrl to 8,386 for Lippert) with $38,708 in campaign expenditures. Hasenohrl chose not to run for re-election in 2000, and Lippert defeated Democrat Amy Sue Vruwink by 104 votes (12,068 [50.2%] to 11,964 [49.8%]) in the 2000 general election, after spending $114,563.

Lippert served on the Assembly's Committees on Children and Families and Public Health (on both of which she served as Vice-Chair), as well as the Committees on Aging and Long-Term Care; Economic Development; Health; and Transportation.

In 2002, she chose not to run for re-election due to the health of her husband, Jerry, who was suffering from chronic obstructive pulmonary disease, caused by Alpha-1 Antitrypsin Deficiency . She was succeeded by Vruwink.

== After the legislature ==
After leaving the Assembly, Lippert went back to work in community health improvement. In February 2011, she was appointed as Executive Assistant to Eloise Anderson, the new Secretary of the Wisconsin Department of Children and Families, as part of the administration of incoming governor Scott Walker. In December 2012, she was named as the Governor's Northern Director. In that role she traveled throughout Northern Wisconsin serving as a direct link between rural communities and the Governor's Administration.

== Personal life ==
Lippert is a mother of three children and is a long-term resident of Pittsville, Wisconsin. She served as a member of the Pittsville School District board of education.
