= Milladore (town), Wisconsin =

Milladore
- Town
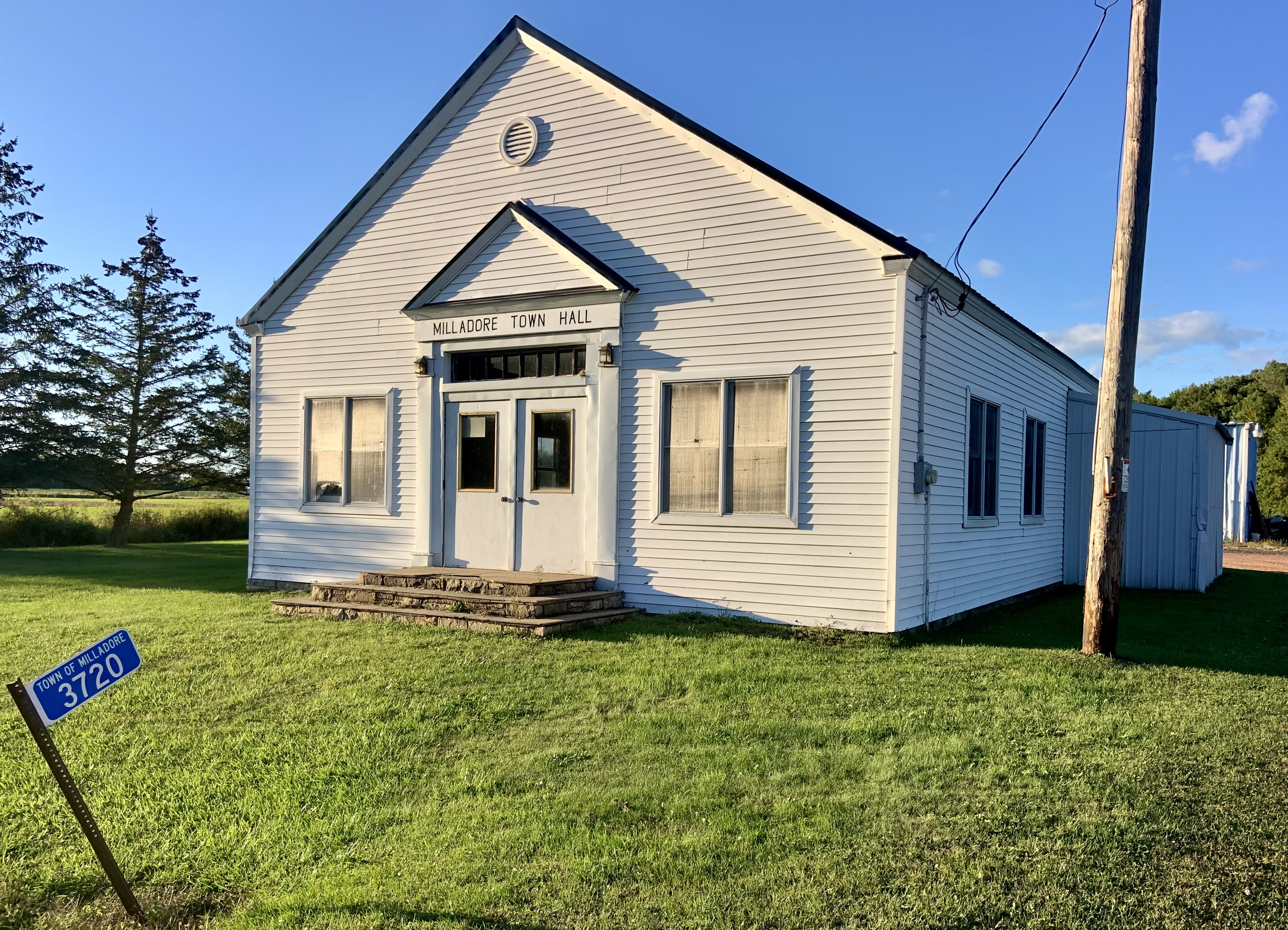
- Town hall

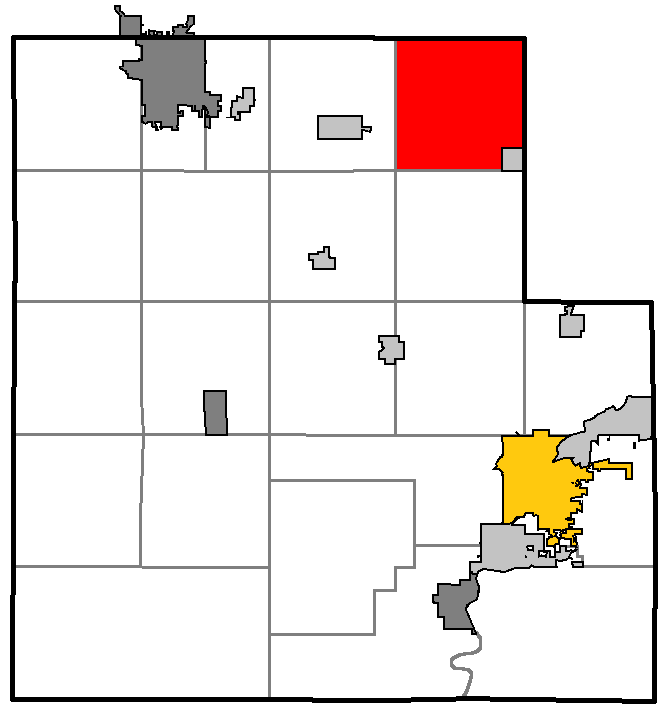
- Location of Milladore within Wood County

- Location within the state of Wisconsin
- Coordinates: 44°36′15″N 89°51′19″W
- Country: United States
- State: Wisconsin
- County: Wood

Area
  - Total: 34.0 sq mi (88.1 km^{2})
  - Land: 34.0 sq mi (88.1 km^{2})
  - Water: 0.039 sq mi (0.1 km^{2})

Population (2020)
  - Total: 668
  - Density: 19.6/sq mi (7.58/km^{2})
- Time zone: UTC-6 (Central (CST))
  - Summer (DST): UTC-5 (CDT)
- Area codes: 715 & 534
- PLSS township: T25N R5E
- Website: https://townofmilladore.com/

Milladore is a town in Wood County, Wisconsin, United States. The population was 668 at the 2020 census. The Village of Milladore is located mostly within the town. The unincorporated community of Blenker is also located in the town.

== Geography ==
According to the United States Census Bureau, the town has a total area of 34.0 square miles (88.1 km^{2}), of which 34.0 square miles (88.1 km^{2}) is land and 0.04 square mile (0.1 km^{2}) (0.06%) is water.

== History ==
The outline of the six mile square that would become the town was first surveyed in the summer of 1851 by a crew working for the U.S. government. In October and November 1852 another crew marked its section corners, walking through the woods and wading the swamps, measuring with chain and compass. When done, the deputy surveyor filed this general description:

This Township is composed of Hardwood Ridges and Hemlock, Tamarac, and Black Ash swamps. All of the swamps are unfit for cultivation although if cleared the Hemlock swamps would produce grass. The surface is level; the Hardwood ridges are but little elevated above the swamps on which the soil is first and second rate. This Township is Heavily timbered chiefly with Hemlock, Yellow Birch, Sugar Maple, Lin(?) and Rock Elm: also considerable White Pine scattered(?) over the Township. There are numerous(?) small creeks in the Township generally lined with alders and some of them have small mashes on them which afford good Hay(?). No improvements in the Township. On the East side of the township exists pretty strong local attraction

Th Town of Milladore was established in 1882, taking its name from the village of Milladore.

== Demographics ==
As of the census of 2000, there were 706 people, 251 households, and 205 families residing in the town. The population density was 20.8 people per square mile (8.0/km^{2}). There were 255 housing units at an average density of 7.5 per square mile (2.9/km^{2}). The racial makeup of the town was 99.72% White, 0.14% Native American, and 0.14% from other races. 0.14% of the population were Hispanic or Latino of any race.

There were 251 households, out of which 37.8% had children under the age of 18 living with them, 67.7% were married couples living together, 7.6% had a female householder with no husband present, and 18.3% were non-families. 16.3% of all households were made up of individuals, and 5.2% had someone living alone who was 65 years of age or older. The average household size was 2.78 and the average family size was 3.12.

In the town, the population was spread out, with 26.9% under the age of 18, 9.1% from 18 to 24, 31.3% from 25 to 44, 21.1% from 45 to 64, and 11.6% who were 65 years of age or older. The median age was 36 years. For every 100 females, there were 120.6 males. For every 100 females age 18 and over, there were 111.5 males.

The median income for a household in the town was $50,104, and the median income for a family was $51,667. Males had a median income of $34,531 versus $20,917 for females. The per capita income for the town was $18,410. About 2.9% of families and 3.6% of the population were below the poverty line, including 5.6% of those under age 18 and 3.1% of those age 65 or over.
