= Milladore, Wisconsin =

- Village
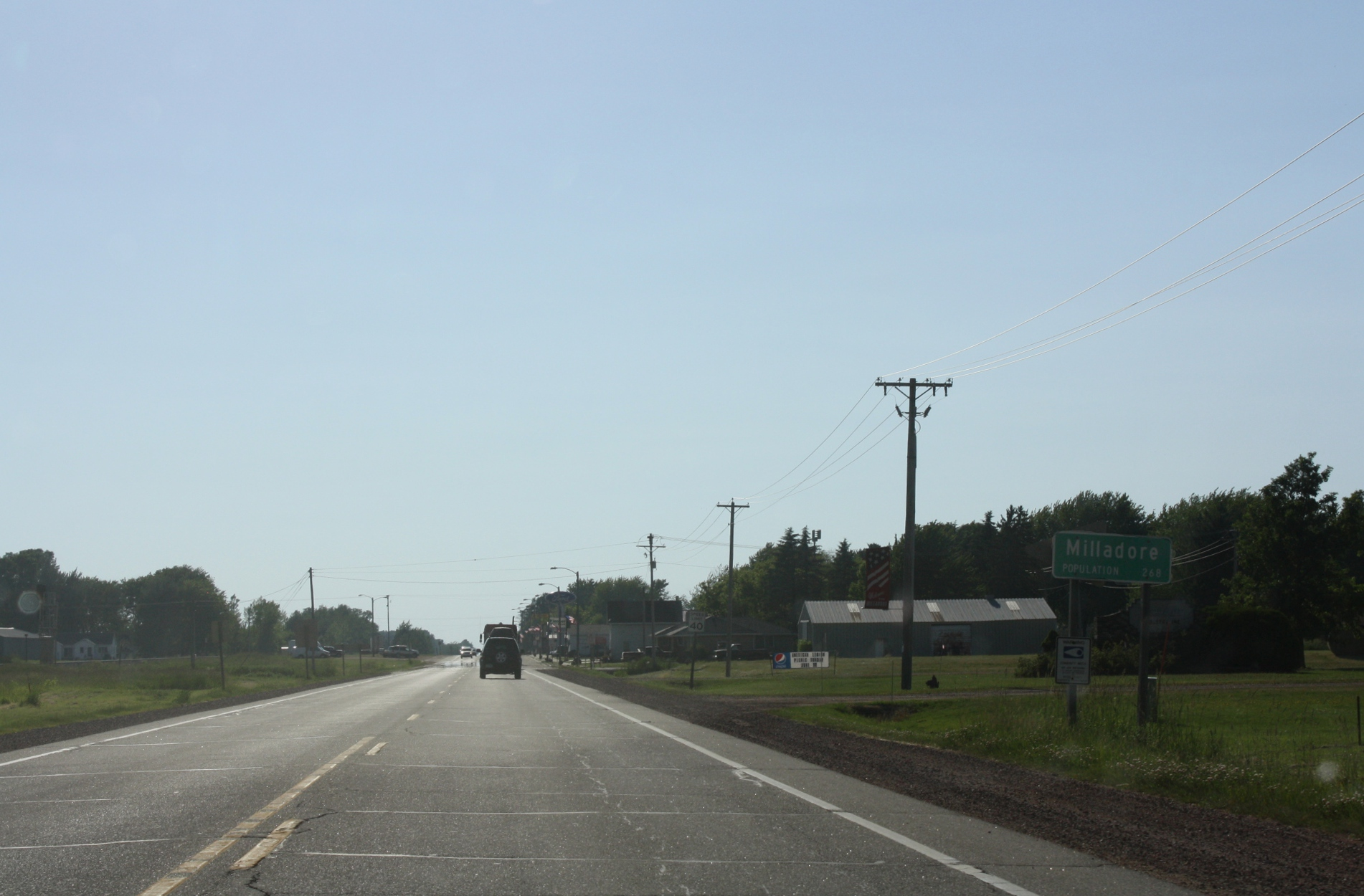
- Looking west in downtown Milladore

- Location of Milladore in Portage County, Wisconsin.
- Coordinates: 44°36′15″N 89°51′8″W
- Country: United States
- State: Wisconsin
- Counties: Wood, Portage

Area
  - Total: 1.00 sq mi (2.58 km^{2})
  - Land: 1.00 sq mi (2.58 km^{2})
  - Water: 0 sq mi (0.00 km^{2})
- Elevation: 1,194 ft (364 m)

Population (2020)
  - Total: 268
  - Density: 269/sq mi (104/km^{2})
- Time zone: UTC-6 (Central (CST))
  - Summer (DST): UTC-5 (CDT)
- Zip code: 54454
- Area codes: 715 & 534
- FIPS code: 55-51875
- GNIS feature ID: 1569499
- Website: http://www.villageofmilladore.com

Milladore is a village in Wood County and overlapping into Portage County in the U.S. state of Wisconsin. The population was 268 at the 2020 census. Most of the village is located within the Town of Milladore in Wood County, while only a very small portion of the village lies in Portage County. All of its 2020 census population resided in the Wood County portion of the village.

== History ==
Milladore was platted in 1877. According to one tradition, an early postmaster selected the name from his reading material, while another tradition states the village was named after a train car. A post office called Milladore has been in operation since 1875.

== Geography ==
Milladore is located at 44°36′15″N 89°51′8″W (44.604282, -89.852281).

According to the United States Census Bureau, the village has a total area of 1.02 square miles (2.64 km^{2}), all land.

== Demographics ==
Historical population
Census	Pop.	Note	%±
1940	226		—
1950	247		9.3%
1960	239		−3.2%
1970	229		−4.2%
1980	250		9.2%
1990	314		25.6%
2000	268		−14.6%
2010	276		3.0%
2020	268		−2.9%
U.S. Decennial Census

=== 2010 census ===
As of the census of 2010, there were 276 people, 106 households, and 73 families living in the village. The population density was 270.6 inhabitants per square mile (104.5/km^{2}). There were 114 housing units at an average density of 111.8 per square mile (43.2/km^{2}). The racial makeup of the village was 93.1% White, 1.1% African American, 5.1% from other races, and 0.7% from two or more races. Hispanic or Latino of any race were 6.9% of the population.

There were 106 households, of which 35.8% had children under the age of 18 living with them, 60.4% were married couples living together, 4.7% had a female householder with no husband present, 3.8% had a male householder with no wife present, and 31.1% were non-families. 27.4% of all households were made up of individuals, and 10.4% had someone living alone who was 65 years of age or older. The average household size was 2.60 and the average family size was 3.21.

The median age in the village was 35 years. 26.1% of residents were under the age of 18; 8.7% were between the ages of 18 and 24; 26% were from 25 to 44; 27.9% were from 45 to 64; and 11.2% were 65 years of age or older. The gender makeup of the village was 54.0% male and 46.0% female.

=== 2000 census ===
At the 2000 census, there were 268 people, 102 households and 70 families living in the village. The population density was 267.6 per square mile (103.5/km^{2}). There were 108 housing units at an average density of 107.9 per square mile (41.7/km^{2}). The racial makeup of the village was 98.88% White, 0.37% Native American (one person), and 0.75% (two people) from two or more races.

There were 102 households, of which 29.4% had children under the age of 18 living with them, 56.9% were married couples living together, 6.9% had a female householder with no husband present, and 30.4% were non-families. 23.5% of all households were made up of individuals, and 11.8% had someone living alone who was 65 years of age or older. The average household size was 2.63 and the average family size was 3.13.

22.8% of the population were under the age of 18, 14.2% from 18 to 24, 27.2% from 25 to 44, 19.4% from 45 to 64, and 16.4% who were 65 years of age or older. The median age was 36 years. For every 100 females, there were 114.4 males. For every 100 females age 18 and over, there were 113.4 males.

The median household income was $46,458 and the median family income was $56,500. Males had a median income of $34,750 versus $16,786 for females. The per capita income for the village was $19,235. About 1.5% of families and 4.1% of the population were below the poverty line, including 6.8% of those under the age of eighteen and 7.9% of those 65 or over.

== Notable people ==
- Amy Sue Vruwink, politician
- Shawn Mancl Philanthropist

== Images ==
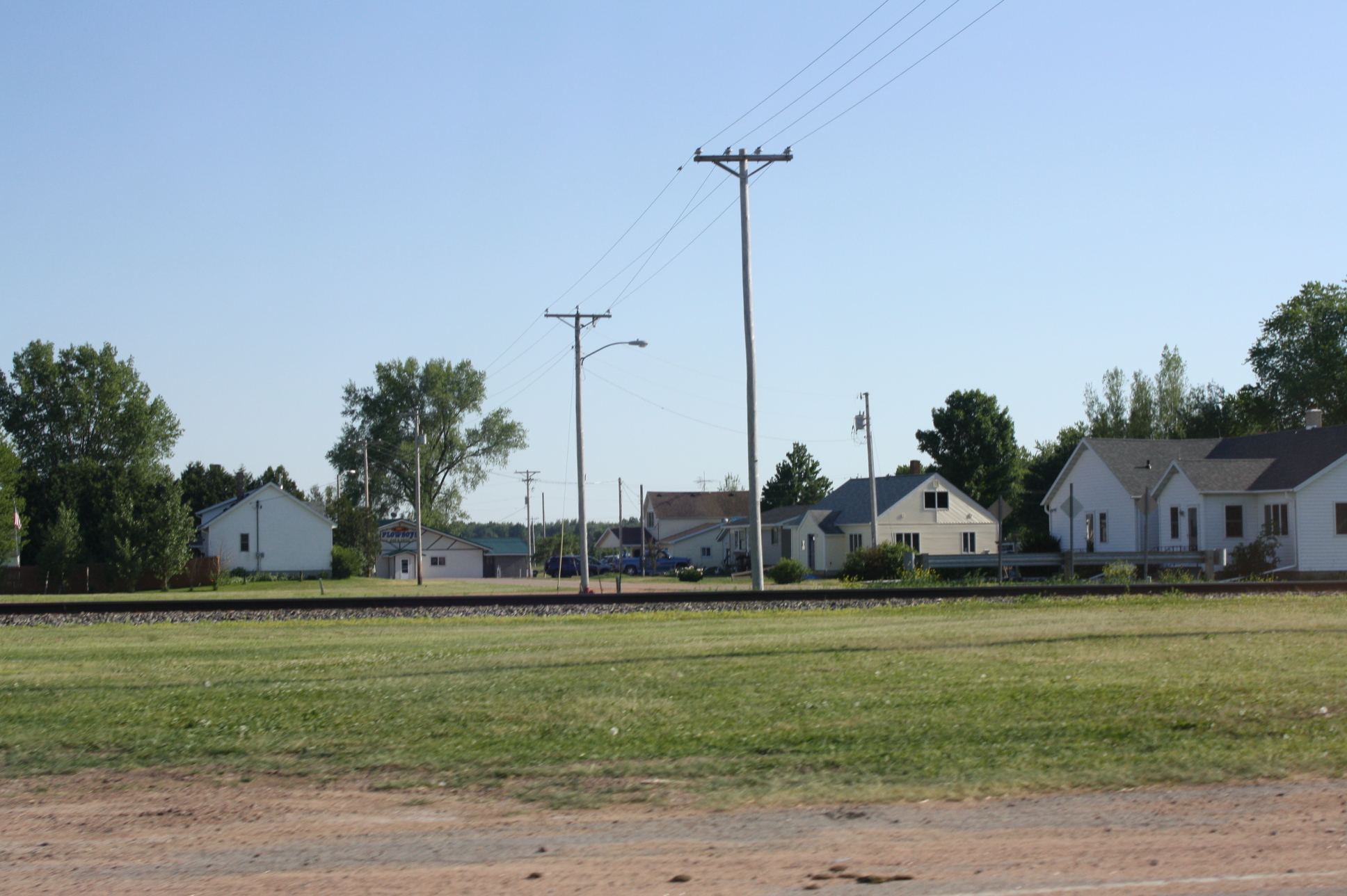
Looking south

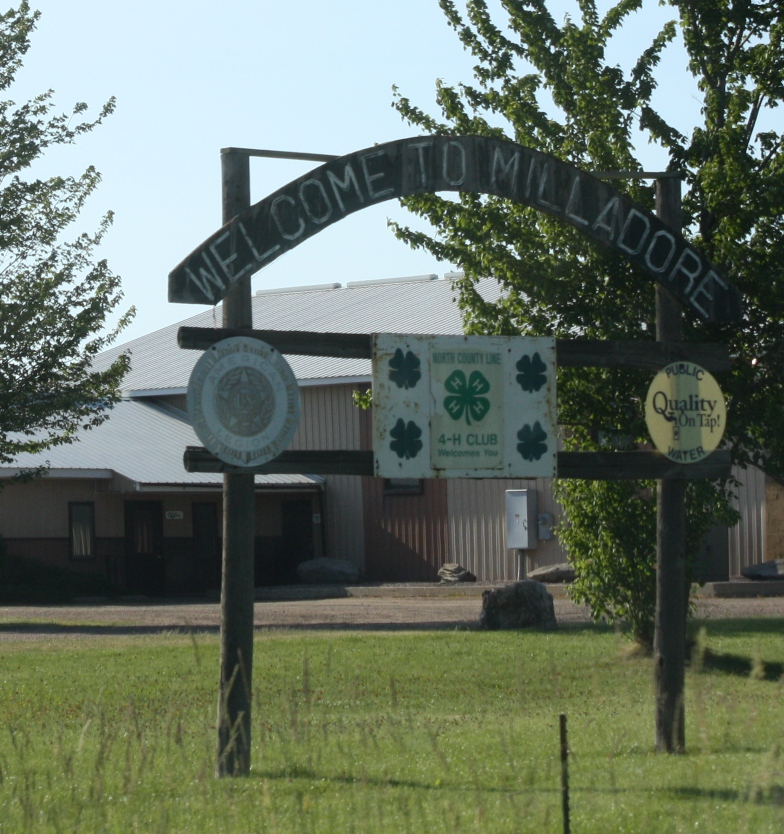
Welcome sign

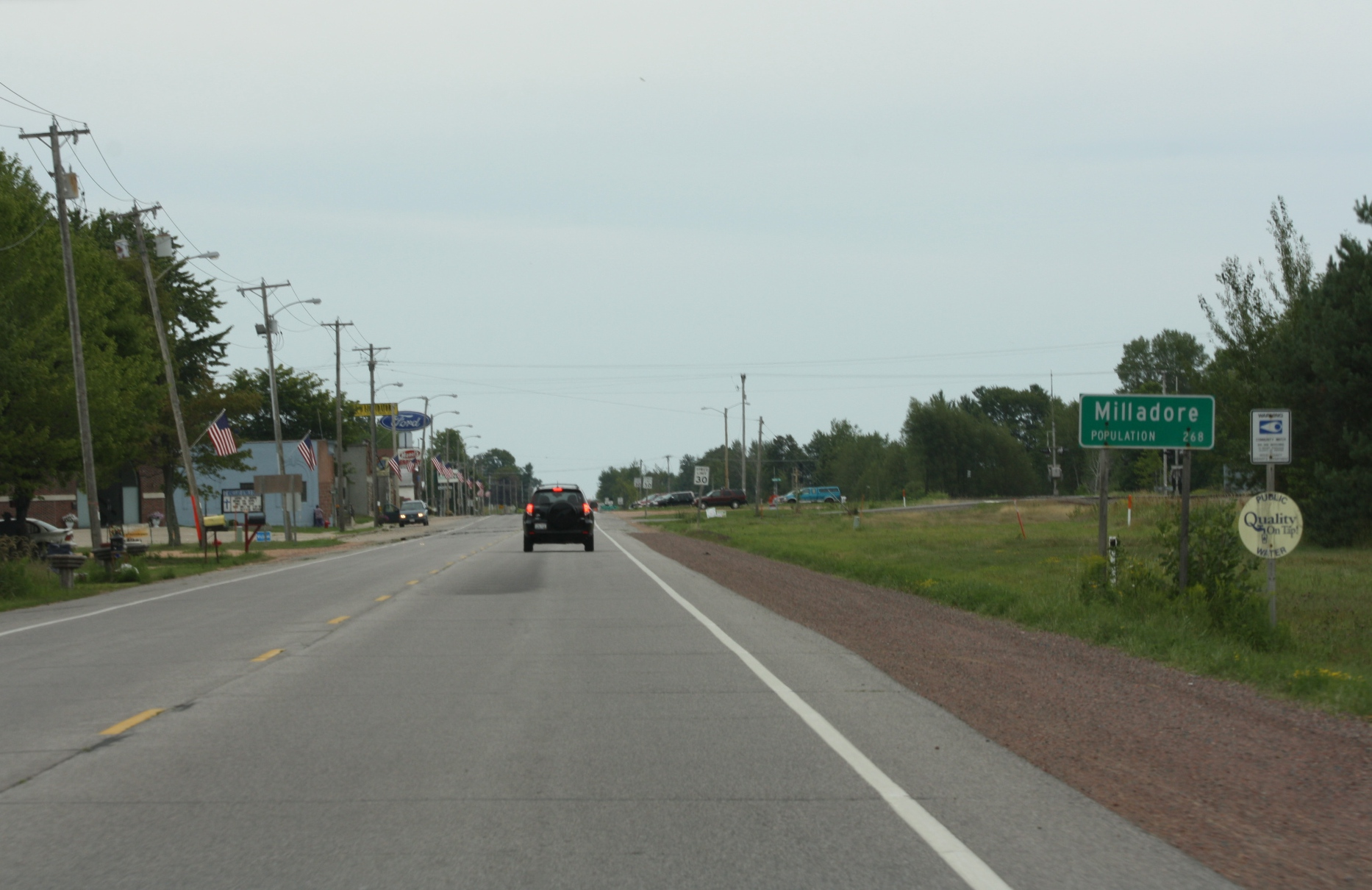
Looking east at the sign for Milladore

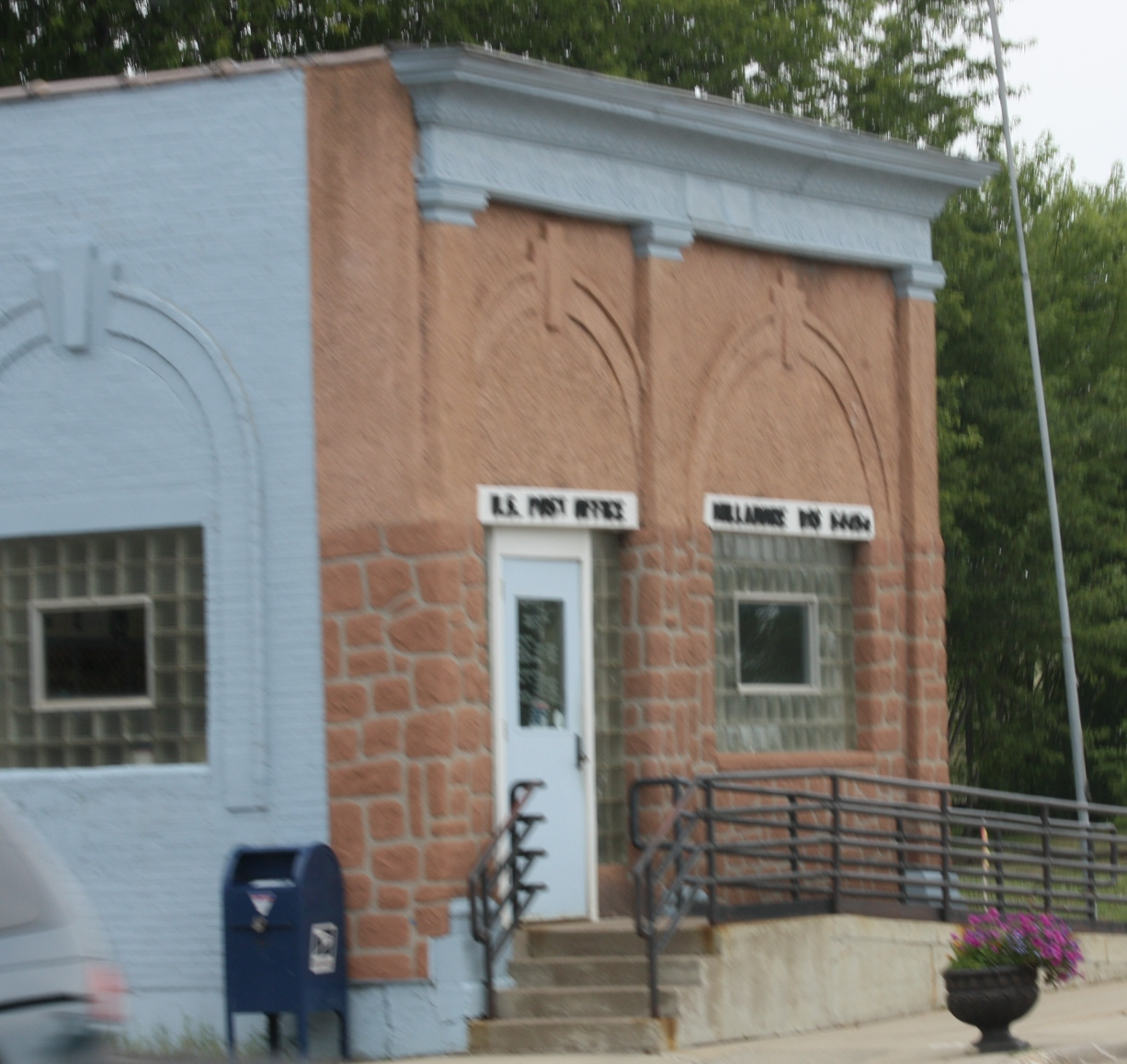
Post office

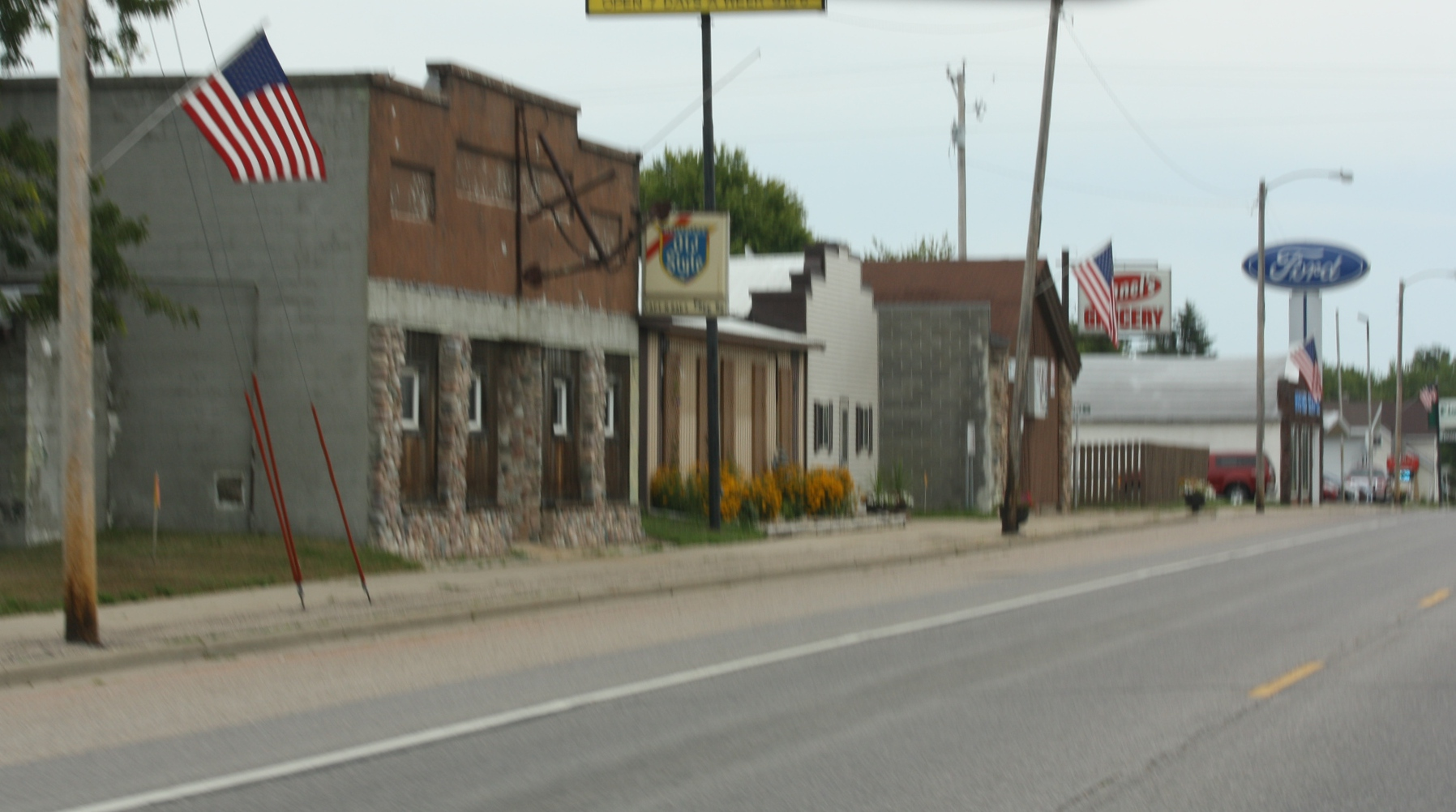
Looking east at downtown Milladore
