= Blenker, Wisconsin =

- Unincorporated community
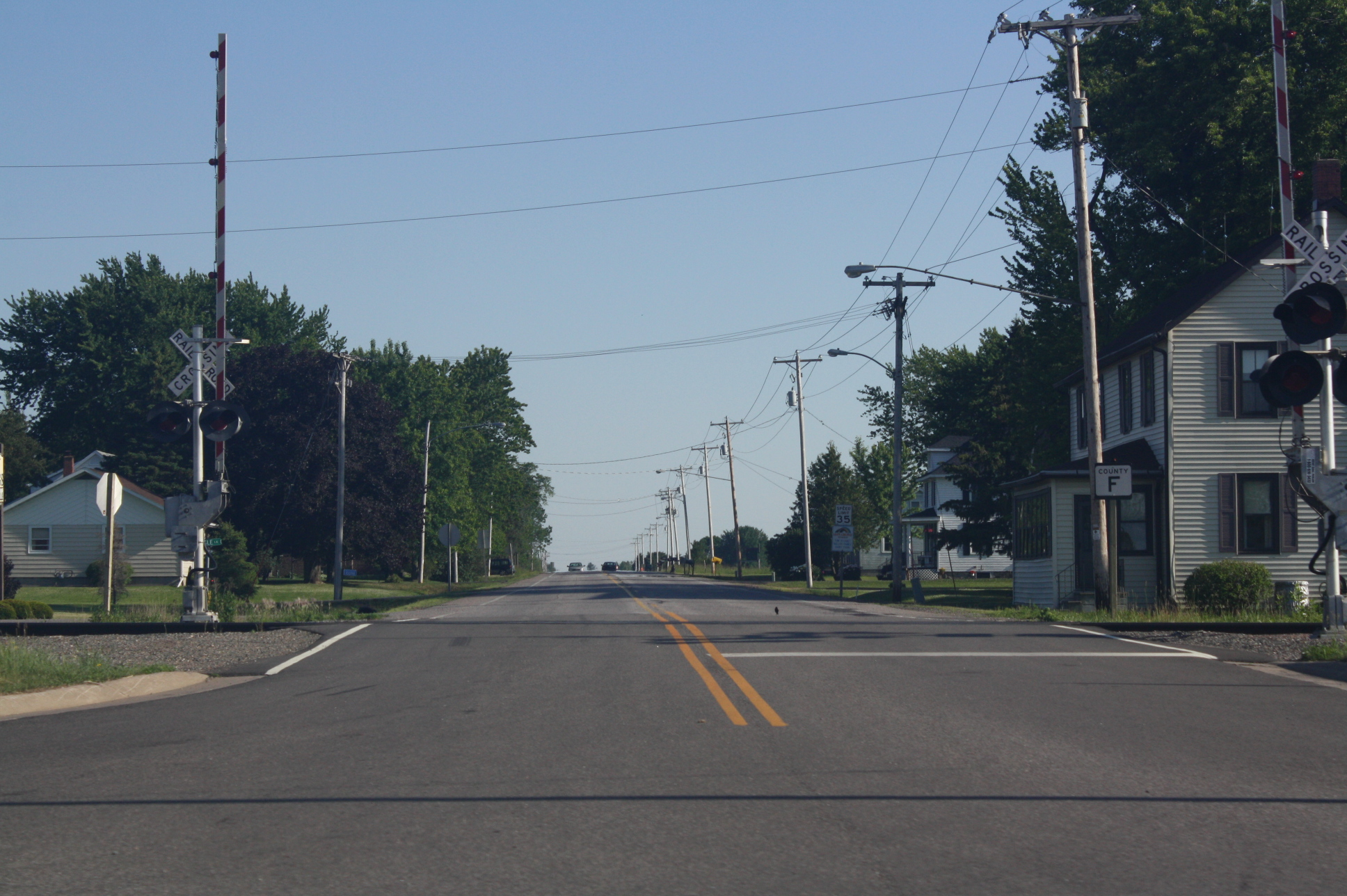
- Looking south in Blenker

- Location within Wisconsin Location within the United States
- Coordinates: 44°36′48″N 89°54′54″W
- Country: United States
- State: Wisconsin
- County: Wood
- Named for: John Blenker
- Elevation: 1,184 ft (361 m)
- Time zone: UTC-6 (Central (CST))
  - Summer (DST): UTC-5 (CDT)
- ZIP code: 54415
- Area codes: 715 & 534
- GNIS feature ID: 1561919

Blenker is an unincorporated community in the town of Milladore, in Wood County, Wisconsin, United States.

== History ==
A post office has been in operation at Blenker since 1886. The community was named after John Blenker, a shopkeeper and the first postmaster. The community once had a schoolhouse, the Blenker School.

== Images ==
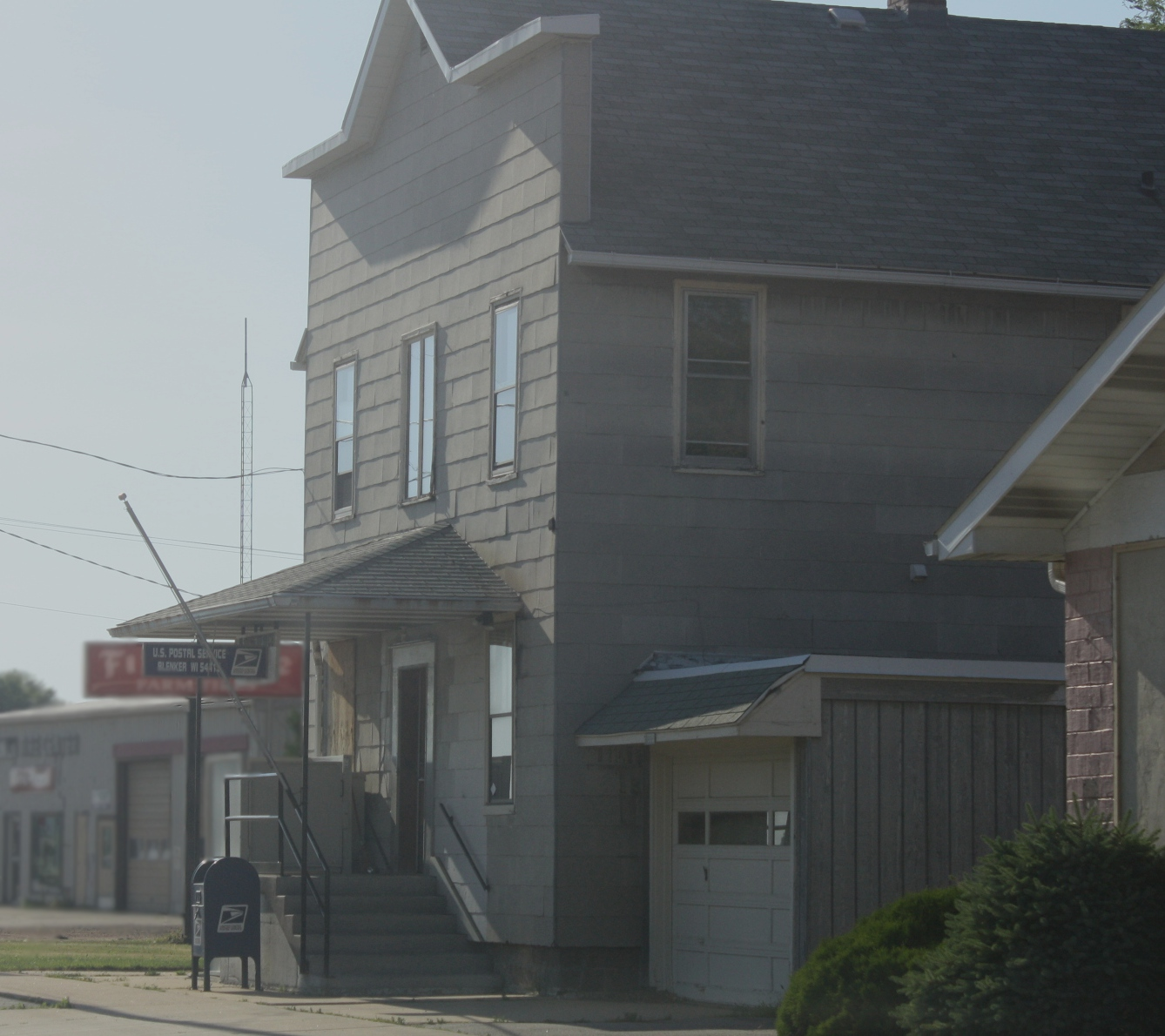
Post office

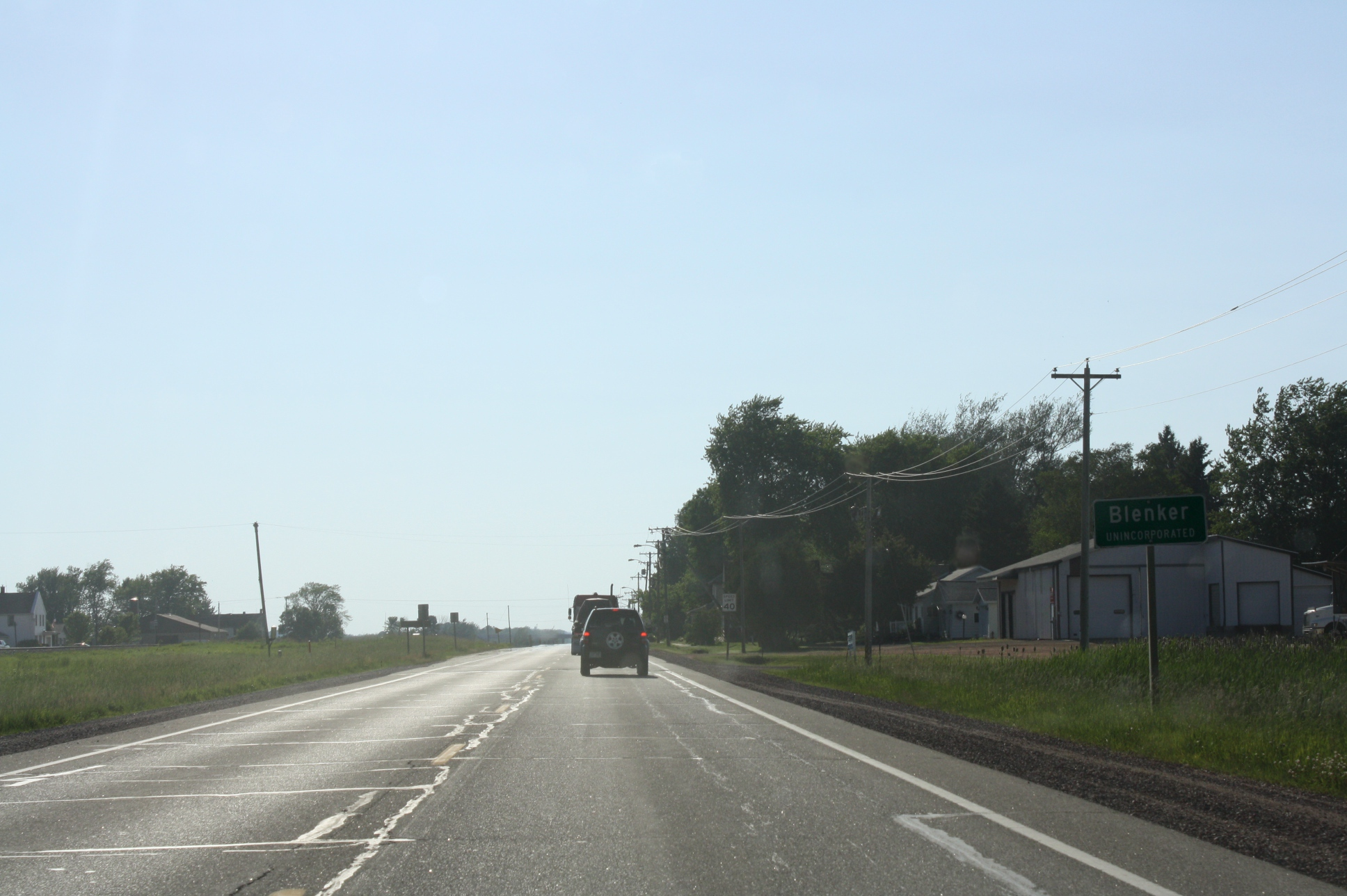
Blenker sign

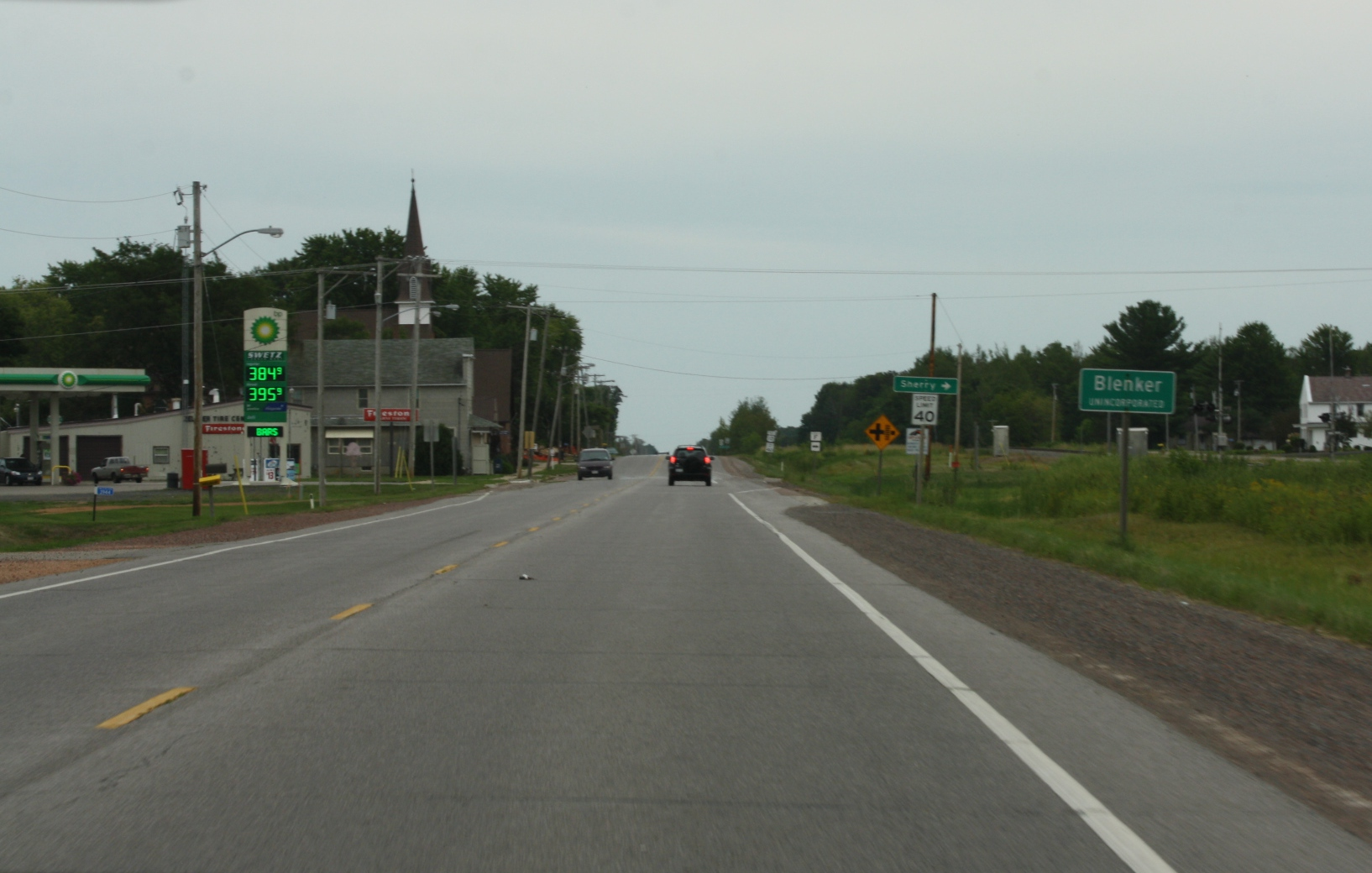
Looking east at Blenker
