= Pittsville School District =

School district in Wisconsin, United States

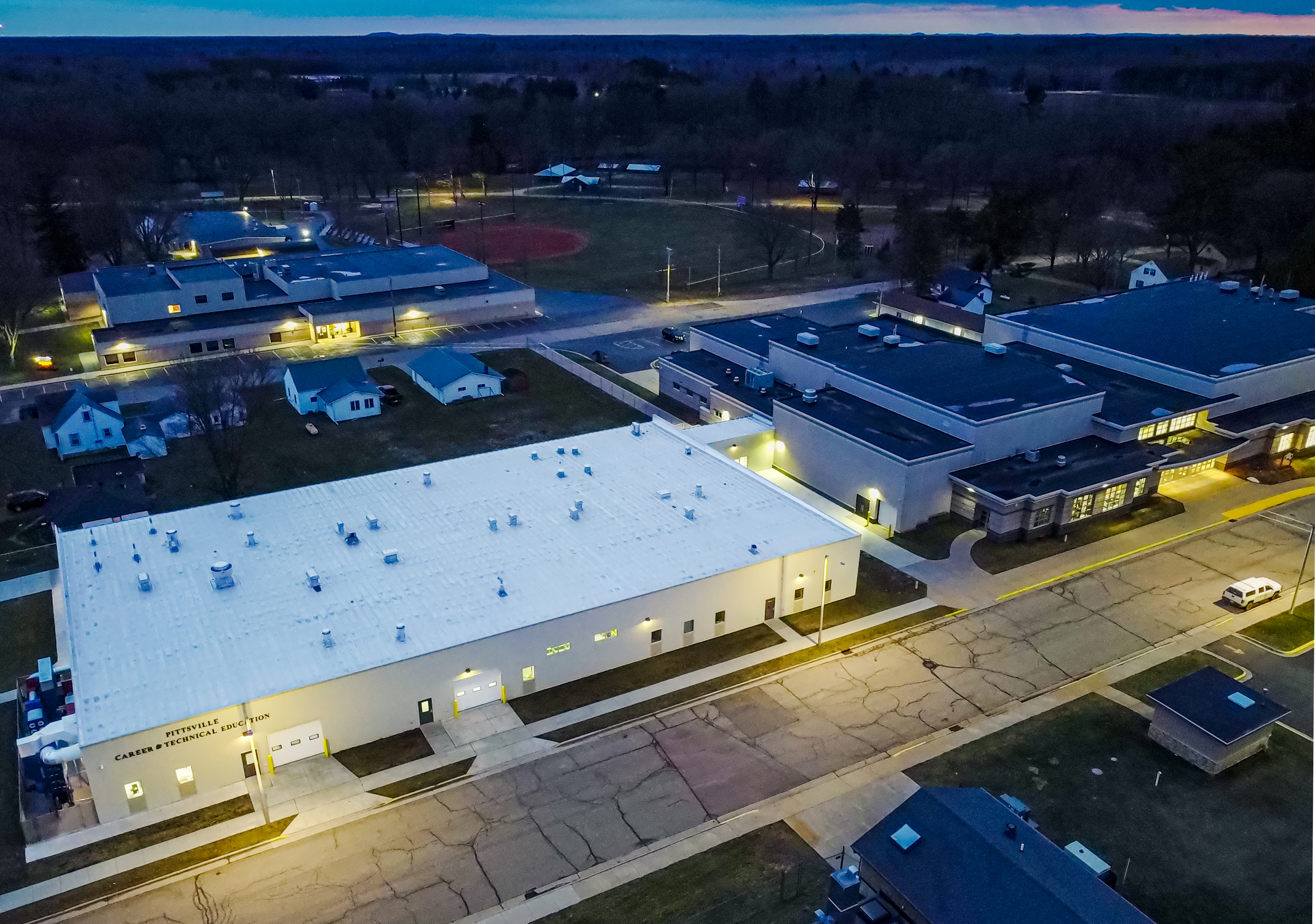
Pittsville Career and Technical Education Center, with the high school in the background.

The Pittsville School District is a small rural school district headquartered in Pittsville in Wood County, Wisconsin.

The Pittsville School District covers an area of over 364 square miles (940 km^{2}). The student enrollment as of the 2025–2025 school year was 541. It is administered by a district superintendent and overseen by a five-member school board. Other administrative staff include an elementary school principal, a high school principal, a business manager, a school psychologist, a technology coordinator, and a building and grounds supervisor. The school system is housed in two buildings: an elementary school and a high school. Within the elementary school is a junior high, middle school and primary school although only the elementary and high schools are reported to the National Center for Education Statistics.
