= John Oestreicher =

American politician

portrait, circa 1973

John C. Oestreicher (August 5, 1936 – January 4, 2011) was an American Democratic politician and lawyer from Wisconsin.

Born in La Crosse, Wisconsin, he graduated from Aquinas High School and studied political science at University of Wisconsin–La Crosse. Oestreicher served in the United States Marine Corps and received a law degree from the University of Wisconsin Law School. Moving to Marshfield, Wisconsin, he served in the Wisconsin State Assembly from 1971 to 1975. Later he served on the Public Service Commission of Wisconsin and the Wisconsin hospital rates board. He moved to Madison, Wisconsin to practice law, dying in Monona, Wisconsin.
