= Pittsville, Wisconsin =

- City
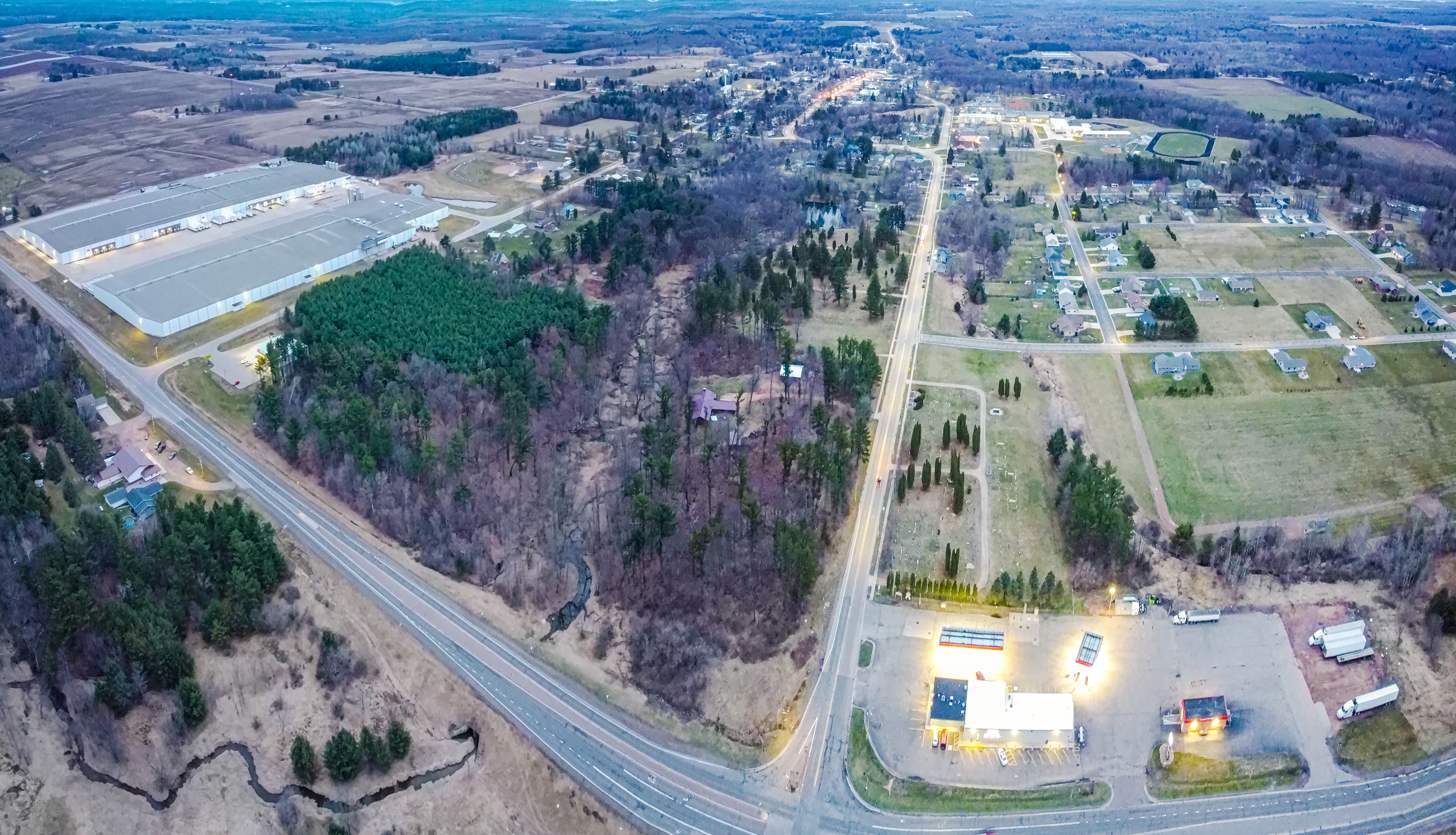
- Wis-73 and Wis-80 junction on the north of town

- Location of Pittsville in Wood County, Wisconsin.

- Location within Wisconsin Location within the United States
- Coordinates: 44°26′25″N 90°7′42″W
- Country: United States
- State: Wisconsin
- County: Wood
- Incorporated: March 30, 1887

Area
  - Total: 2.00 sq mi (5.18 km^{2})
  - Land: 1.99 sq mi (5.15 km^{2})
  - Water: 0.012 sq mi (0.03 km^{2})
- Elevation: 1,033 ft (315 m)

Population (2020)
  - Total: 813
  - Density: 409/sq mi (158/km^{2})
- Time zone: UTC-6 (Central (CST))
  - Summer (DST): UTC-5 (CDT)
- Zip code: 54466
- Area codes: 715 & 534
- FIPS code: 55-63100
- GNIS feature ID: 1571567
- Website: pittsvillewi.gov

Pittsville is a city in Wood County, Wisconsin, United States. Located in a rural part of the county, Pittsville is surrounded by parks and public land, including; North Wood County Park and Campground, Powers Bluff, Dexter County Park and Campground, Sherwood County Park and Campground, Wood County Forest, Sandhill State Wildlife Area, and Black River State Forest. The population was 813 at the 2020 census. Pittsville is recognized as the exact center of Wisconsin.

== History ==
The first settler in the Pittsville area was James Quick Severn, arriving in 1849, but then leaving. Oliver Wright Pitts and his family arrived in late 1856. They lived in a barn-like structure on the riverbank on what is now the south side of town, which served as a "stopping place" (back-country inn) for loggers moving up and down the Yellow River. Oliver started a sawmill and the place was first called "Pitt's Mill." By 1858, when Oliver's father and family arrived, three other men had joined him there. Oliver's son Thomas taught the first school in 1859. The Pitts also built a shingle mill, and a hotel in the 1870s.

Several early mills in Pittsville sawed hardwood into barrel staves and headings, wagon stock, and hubs and spokes for wheels. The population grew. General stores opened and closed. Charles Houston served as a druggist for the town starting in 1879. Catholic services were first held around 1879 and a Congregational church was organized in 1881. A blacksmith shop started in 1881 or 1882. St. John's Lutheran church was organized in 1888.

The railroad arrived in 1883, and with that, growth sped up. The village was platted that same year, and The Pittsville Independent newspaper started that year. In 1886 Pittsville incorporated as a village and the following year as a city. An issue of the paper from 1887 contains advertisements for Christenson & Bro General Store; Roscoe Doud, Son & Co. general store; C.V. Doud & Son general store; McConnell Sisters millinery; Cotey general merchandise and dry goods; McRaith tailor; City Drug Store; a watch dealer and repairer; Dawes boots and shoes; Pittsville market (meat?); Chet Doud livery; Johnson flour, butter and eggs; two saloons; dentist W.H. Packard; and a G.A.R. post. Hiles and Ward advertised surrounding lands from $2.50 to $6.00 per acre. Pittsville's first harness shop opened in 1888 - a flour and feed mill in 1890. A Masonic lodge was chartered in 1886 and an Odd Fellows lodge in 1888.

In 1902 telephone lines reached Pittsville from Wisconsin Rapids. The Pittsville State Bank was organized in 1904. A creamery opened the same year, buying milk from Clark, Jackson and Wood counties. A co-op cheese factory opened in 1919. The transition from logging and milling to agriculture was under way.

Bad fires destroyed large parts of Pittsville's downtown in 1911, 1924 and 1928. After the 1928 fire, many of the businesses moved from Main Street to 2nd Avenue, which is now highway 80.

Governor Walter J. Kohler Jr. frequently visited the Pittsville area during the 1950s. On June 27, 1952, he made an Official Proclamation declaring Pittsville the exact center of the State.

== Geography ==
Pittsville is located at 44°26′25″N 90°7′42″W (44.440409, -90.128249).

According to the United States Census Bureau, the city has a total area of 1.98 square miles (5.13 km^{2}), of which 1.97 square miles (5.10 km^{2}) is land and 0.01 square miles (0.03 km^{2}) is water.

== Demographics ==
Historical population
Census	Pop.	Note	%±
1880	163		—
1890	653		300.6%
1900	634		−2.9%
1910	450		−29.0%
1920	504		12.0%
1930	508		0.8%
1940	556		9.4%
1950	636		14.4%
1960	661		3.9%
1970	708		7.1%
1980	810		14.4%
1990	838		3.5%
2000	866		3.3%
2010	874		0.9%
2020	813		−7.0%
U.S. Decennial Census

=== 2010 census ===
As of the census of 2010, there were 874 people, 338 households, and 238 families living in the city. The population density was 443.7 inhabitants per square mile (171.3/km^{2}). There were 378 housing units at an average density of 191.9 per square mile (74.1/km^{2}). The racial makeup of the city was 97.9% White, 0.3% Native American, 0.8% Asian, and 0.9% from two or more races. Hispanic or Latino of any race were 0.8% of the population.

There were 338 households, of which 35.2% had children under the age of 18 living with them, 55.0% were married couples living together, 10.7% had a female householder with no husband present, 4.7% had a male householder with no wife present, and 29.6% were non-families. 25.4% of all households were made up of individuals, and 11.3% had someone living alone who was 65 years of age or older. The average household size was 2.55 and the average family size was 3.03.

The median age in the city was 36 years. 27.5% of residents were under the age of 18; 7.2% were between the ages of 18 and 24; 26% were from 25 to 44; 24.9% were from 45 to 64; and 14.5% were 65 years of age or older. The gender makeup of the city was 50.0% male and 50.0% female.

=== 2000 census ===
As of the census of 2000, there were 866 people, 331 households, and 238 families living in the city. The population density was 432.9 people per square mile (167.2/km^{2}). There were 351 housing units at an average density of 175.5 per square mile (67.8/km^{2}). The racial makeup of the city was 98.96% White, 0.12% African American, 0.35% Native American, 0.12% from other races, and 0.46% from two or more races. Hispanic or Latino of any race were 0.23% of the population.

There were 331 households, out of which 39.0% had children under the age of 18 living with them, 57.7% were married couples living together, 9.7% had a female householder with no husband present, and 27.8% were non-families. 25.7% of all households were made up of individuals, and 12.1% had someone living alone who was 65 years of age or older. The average household size was 2.60 and the average family size was 3.08.

In the city, the population was spread out, with 29.2% under the age of 18, 8.4% from 18 to 24, 30.8% from 25 to 44, 19.4% from 45 to 64, and 12.1% who were 65 years of age or older. The median age was 34 years. For every 100 females, there were 100.9 males. For every 100 females age 18 and over, there were 97.1 males.

The median income for a household in the city was $36,750, and the median income for a family was $41,964. Males had a median income of $30,500 versus $20,625 for females. The per capita income for the city was $16,257. About 2.2% of families and 5.4% of the population were below the poverty line, including 5.4% of those under age 18 and 12.3% of those age 65 or over.

== Notable people ==
- Red Blanchard, country musician
- Amos E. Germer, Wisconsin legislator and lawyer
- MaryAnn Lippert, Wisconsin legislator and educator
- Matt Hanutke, Wisconsin first 4-years undefeated high school wrestler.

== Education ==
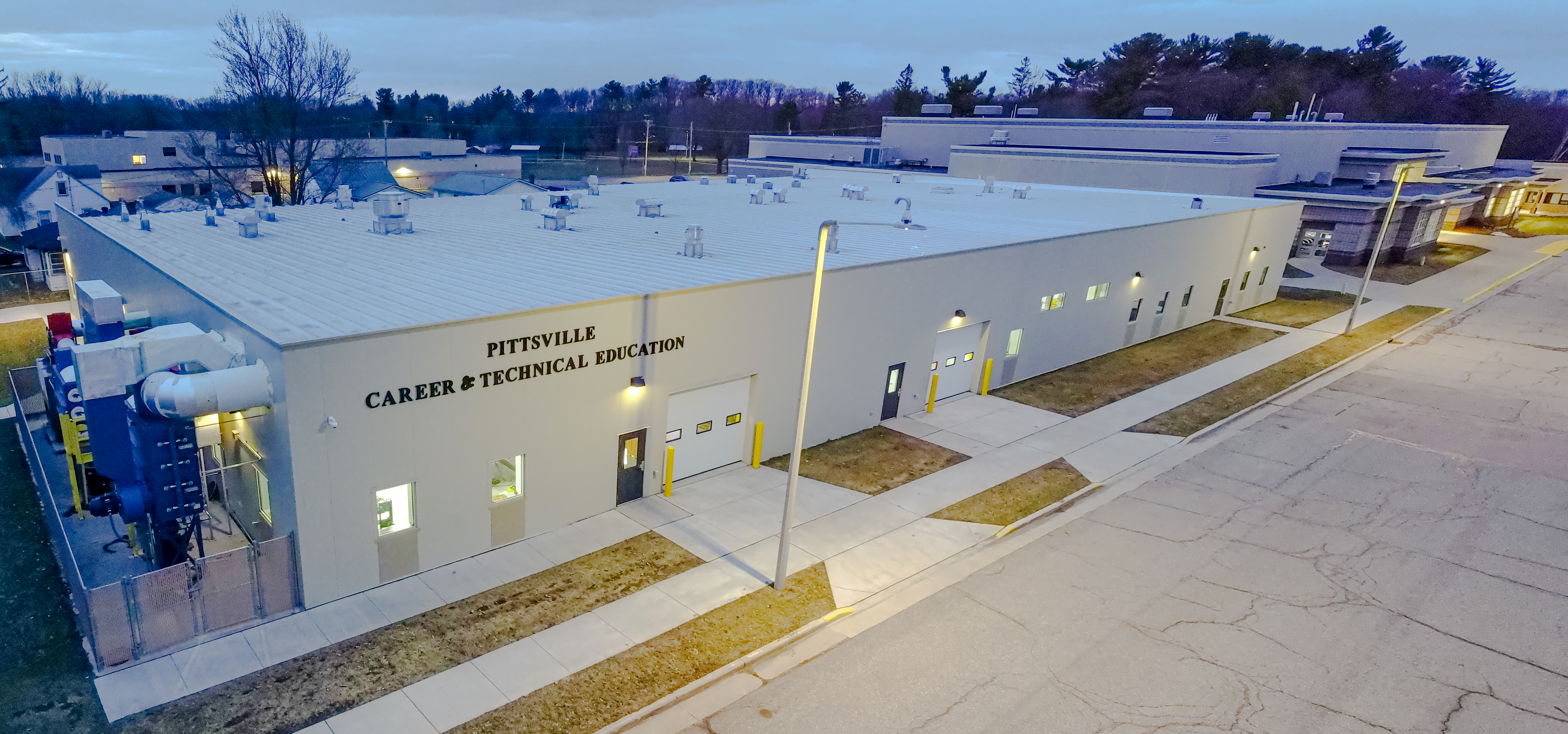
Pittsville Career and Technical Education Center

The city is also home to the Pittsville School District, which has a school population of about 600 students.
