= Alan S. Robertson =

American judge and politician

The Honorable Alan S. Robertson

Wisconsin Circuit Court Judge for the Trempealeau Circuit
- In office July 31, 1994 – July 31, 1995
- Appointed by: Tommy Thompson
- Preceded by: Richard Galstad
- Succeeded by: John A. Damon

Member of the Wisconsin State Assembly
- In office September 19, 1979 – January 3, 1983
- Preceded by: Steve Gunderson
- Succeeded by: Dale Schultz
- Constituency: 91st district
- In office April 1971 – January 1, 1973
- Preceded by: John Q. Radcliffe
- Succeeded by: Position abolished
- Constituency: Jackson–Trempealeau district

Personal details
- Born: April 10, 1941 (age 85) Beloit, Wisconsin
- Children: 3
- Education: University of Wisconsin-Madison; University of Wisconsin Law School

Alan S. Robertson (born April 10, 1941) is an American lawyer, and retired Republican politician and judge. He was a member of the Wisconsin State Assembly for three terms, and was an appointed Wisconsin Circuit Court judge in Trempealeau County.

== Biography ==
Robertson was born in Beloit, Wisconsin, on April 10, 1941. He graduated from Beloit Memorial High School and attended the University of Wisconsin-Madison and the University of Wisconsin Law School, earning his Bachelor's degree and Juris Doctor. Robertson is married with three children and has served as a scoutmaster with the Boy Scouts of America.

== Career ==
After being admitted to the State Bar of Wisconsin, Robertson went to work as an assistant district attorney in Trempealeau County, Wisconsin. In 1969, he was also elected City Attorney for Blair, Wisconsin, and town attorney for the town of Preston.

In 1971, four-term incumbent state representative John Q. Radcliffe resigned to accept a role in the new governor's administration. Robertson ran and was elected in the special election to replace him in the 1971-1972 session of the legislature. He served on the committees on taxation and printing, but lost his bid for re-election in 1972.

In 1979, another opportunity in the legislature presented itself when incumbent state representative Steve Gunderson resigned his seat to accept a role on the staff of congressman Toby Roth. Robertson ran again and defeated former state representative John Q. Radcliffe in the September special election. He ultimately won one more term in the assembly, narrowly defeating Democrat Rodney C. Moen in 1980, before losing re-election in 1982 to Barbara Gronemus after redistricting.

Robertson resumed his law practice, but returned to public service one more time, in 1994, when Governor Tommy Thompson appointed him to the Wisconsin circuit court in Tremplealeau County to fill the vacancy created by the resignation of Judge Richard Galstad. He ran for a full term on the court in April 1995, but was defeated.

== Electoral history ==
=== Wisconsin Assembly Jackson–Trempealeau District (1971) ===
Wisconsin Assembly, Jackson–Trempealeau District Special Election, 1971
| Party | Candidate | Votes | % | ±% |
|---|---|---|---|---|
Republican Primary Election, March 2, 1971
| Republican | Alan S. Robertson | 753 | 52.47% | |
| Republican | Frieda Kislinger | 682 | 47.53% | |
| Total votes | | 1,435 | 100.0% | |
Special Election, April 6, 1971
| Republican | Alan S. Robertson | 5,026 | 53.48% | +24.40% |
| Democratic | Keith C. Hardie | 4,372 | 46.52% | −23.68% |
| Plurality | | 654 | 6.96% | -34.16% |
| Total votes | | 9,398 | 100.0% | -21.36% |
| Republican gain from Democratic | | Swing | 48.08% | |

=== Wisconsin Assembly 91st District (1972) ===
Wisconsin Assembly, 91st District Election, 1972
| Party | Candidate | Votes | % | ±% |
|---|---|---|---|---|
Special Election, November 7, 1972
| Democratic | Eugene Oberle | 8,916 | 51.16% | |
| Republican | Alan S. Robertson | 7,556 | 43.36% | |
| Independent | Galen I. Smith | 955 | 5.48% | |
| Plurality | | 1,360 | 7.80% | |
| Total votes | | 17,427 | 100.0% | |
| Democratic win (new seat) | | | | |

=== Wisconsin Assembly 91st District (1979, 1980) ===
Wisconsin Assembly, 91st District Special Election, 1979
| Party | Candidate | Votes | % | ±% |
|---|---|---|---|---|
Republican Primary Election, August 21, 1979
| Republican | Alan S. Robertson | 1,041 | 27.37% | |
| Republican | Robert Berglund | 872 | 22.92% | |
| Republican | Gaylord E. Olson | 561 | 14.75% | |
| Republican | William J. Theiler | 558 | 14.67% | |
| Republican | Leland Wolfgang | 529 | 13.91% | |
| Republican | Louise Flury | 243 | 6.39% | |
| Total votes | | 33,804 | 100.0% | |
Special Election, September 11, 1979
| Republican | Alan S. Robertson | 3,267 | 52.53% | −20.96% |
| Democratic | John Q. Radcliffe | 2,952 | 47.47% | |
| Plurality | | 315 | 5.07% | -41.93% |
| Total votes | | 6,219 | 100.0% | -59.14% |
| Republican hold | | | | |

Wisconsin Assembly, 91st District Election, 1980
| Party | Candidate | Votes | % | ±% |
|---|---|---|---|---|
Republican Primary Election, September 9, 1980
| Republican | Alan S. Robertson (incumbent) | 3,166 | 66.17% | |
| Republican | William J. Theiler | 1,619 | 33.83% | |
| Total votes | | 4,785 | 100.0% | |
General Election, November 4, 1980
| Republican | Alan S. Robertson (incumbent) | 10,582 | 50.08% | −2.45% |
| Democratic | Rodney C. Moen | 10,549 | 49.92% | |
| Plurality | | 33 | 0.16% | -4.91% |
| Total votes | | 21,131 | 100.0% | +239.78% |
| Republican hold | | | | |

=== Wisconsin Assembly 43rd District (1982) ===
Wisconsin Assembly, 43rd District Election, 1982
| Party | Candidate | Votes | % | ±% |
|---|---|---|---|---|
Republican Primary Election, September 14, 1982
| Republican | Alan S. Robertson | 3,225 | 77.04% | |
| Republican | Bradford Morgan | 961 | 22.96% | |
| Total votes | | 4,186 | 100.0% | |
General Election, November 2, 1982
| Democratic | Barbara Gronemus | 7,889 | 52.91% | +20.32% |
| Republican | Alan S. Robertson | 7,021 | 47.09% | −16.63% |
| Plurality | | 868 | 5.82% | -25.31% |
| Total votes | | 14,910 | 100.0% | +33.77% |
| Democratic gain from Republican | | Swing | 36.96% | |

=== Wisconsin Circuit Court (1995) ===
Wisconsin Circuit Court, Trempealeau Circuit Election, 1995
| Party | Candidate | Votes | % | ±% |
|---|---|---|---|---|
Primary Election, February 21, 1995
| Nonpartisan | John A. Damon | 1,217 | 36.99% | |
| Nonpartisan | Alan S. Robertson (incumbent) | 1,165 | 35.41% | |
| Nonpartisan | LaVerne Michalak | 530 | 16.11% | |
| Nonpartisan | William A. Mattka | 378 | 11.49% | |
| Total votes | | 3,290 | 100.0% | |
General Election, April 4, 1995
| Nonpartisan | John A. Damon | 3,386 | 55.87% | |
| Nonpartisan | Alan S. Robertson (incumbent) | 2,674 | 44.13% | |
| Plurality | | 712 | 11.75% | |
| Total votes | | 6,060 | 100.0% | |

Wisconsin State Assembly
| Preceded by John Q. Radcliffe | Member of the Wisconsin State Assembly from the Jackson–Trempealeau district April 1971 – January 1, 1973 | District abolished |
| Preceded by Steve Gunderson | Member of the Wisconsin State Assembly from the 91st district September 19, 1979 – January 3, 1983 | Succeeded by Dale Schultz |
Legal offices
| Preceded by Richard Galstad | Wisconsin Circuit Court Judge for the Trempealeau Circuit; July 31, 1994 – July 31, 1995 | Succeeded by John A. Damon |
