= Wisconsin's 50th Assembly district =

American legislative district in southern Wisconsin

Wisconsin's 50th State Assembly district
- 2024 map defined in 2023 Wisc. Act 94; 2022 map defined in Johnson v. Wisconsin Elections Commission; 2011 map was defined in 2011 Wisc. Act 43
Assemblymember
Jenna Jacobson; D–Oregon
since January 6, 2025 (1 years)
- Demographics: 93.15% White; 0.71% Black; 2.75% Hispanic; 0.78% Asian; 1.31% Native American; 0.09% Hawaiian/Pacific Islander
- Population (2020) • Voting age: 59,024; 45,398
- Website: Official website
- Notes: Southern Wisconsin

The 50th Assembly district of Wisconsin is one of 99 districts in the Wisconsin State Assembly. Located in southern Wisconsin, the district comprises all of Green County, and parts of southwest Dane County including the southwestern exurban areas outside of Madison. It includes the cities of Brodhead and Monroe, and the villages of Albany, Belleville, Brooklyn, Browntown, Monticello, New Glarus, and Oregon. The district also contains Cadiz Springs State Recreation Area. The district is represented by Democratic Jenna Jacobson, since January 2025; Jacobson previously represented the 43rd district from 2023 to 2025.

The 50th Assembly district is located within Wisconsin's 17th Senate district, along with the 49th and 51st Assembly districts.

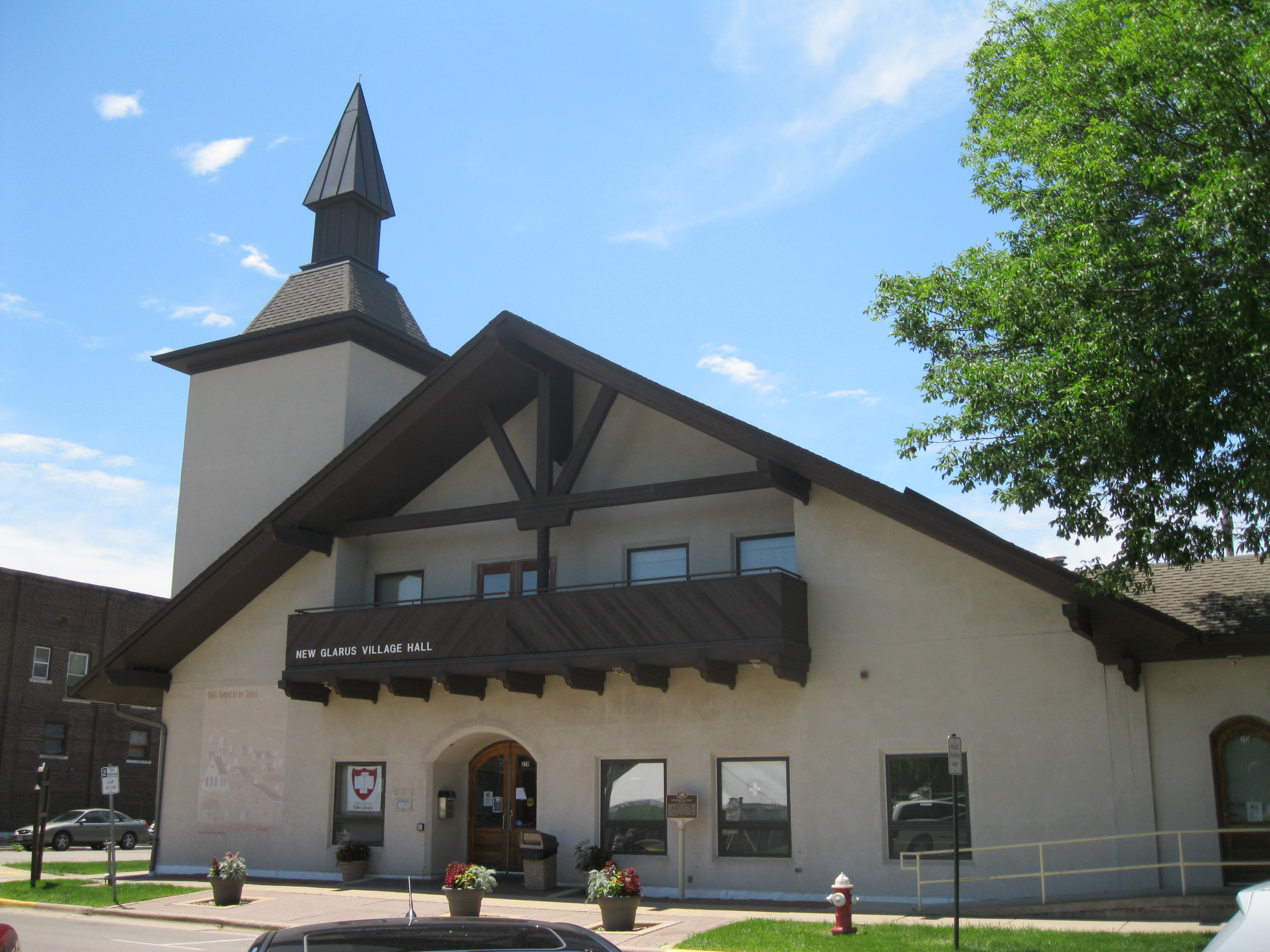
New Glarus village hall

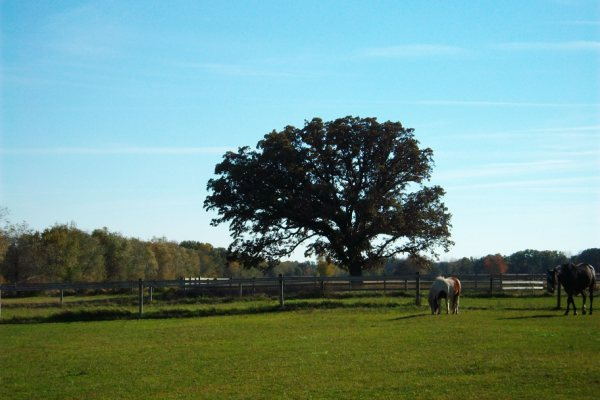
Half-Way Tree in Brodhead

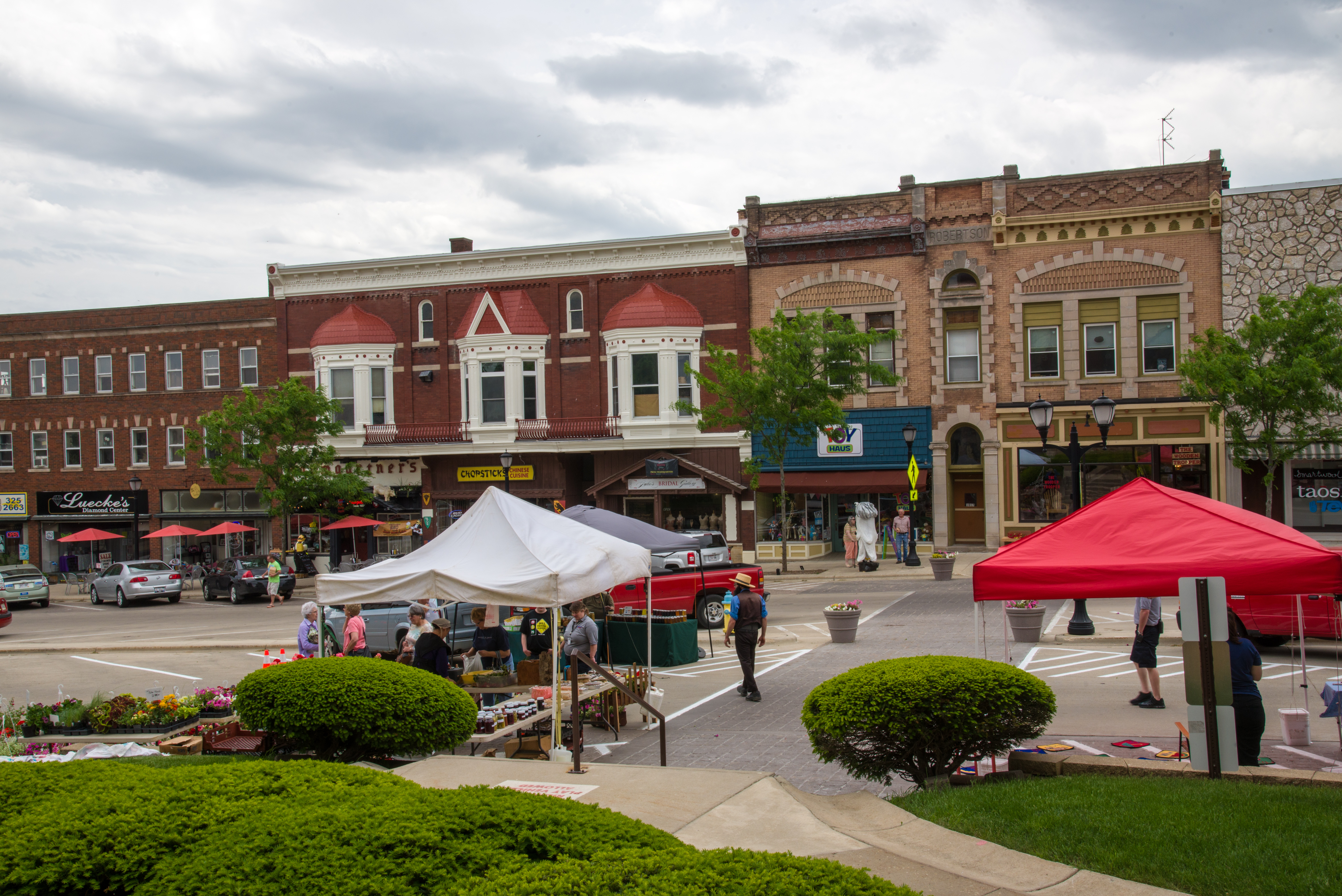
Monroe, Wisconsin

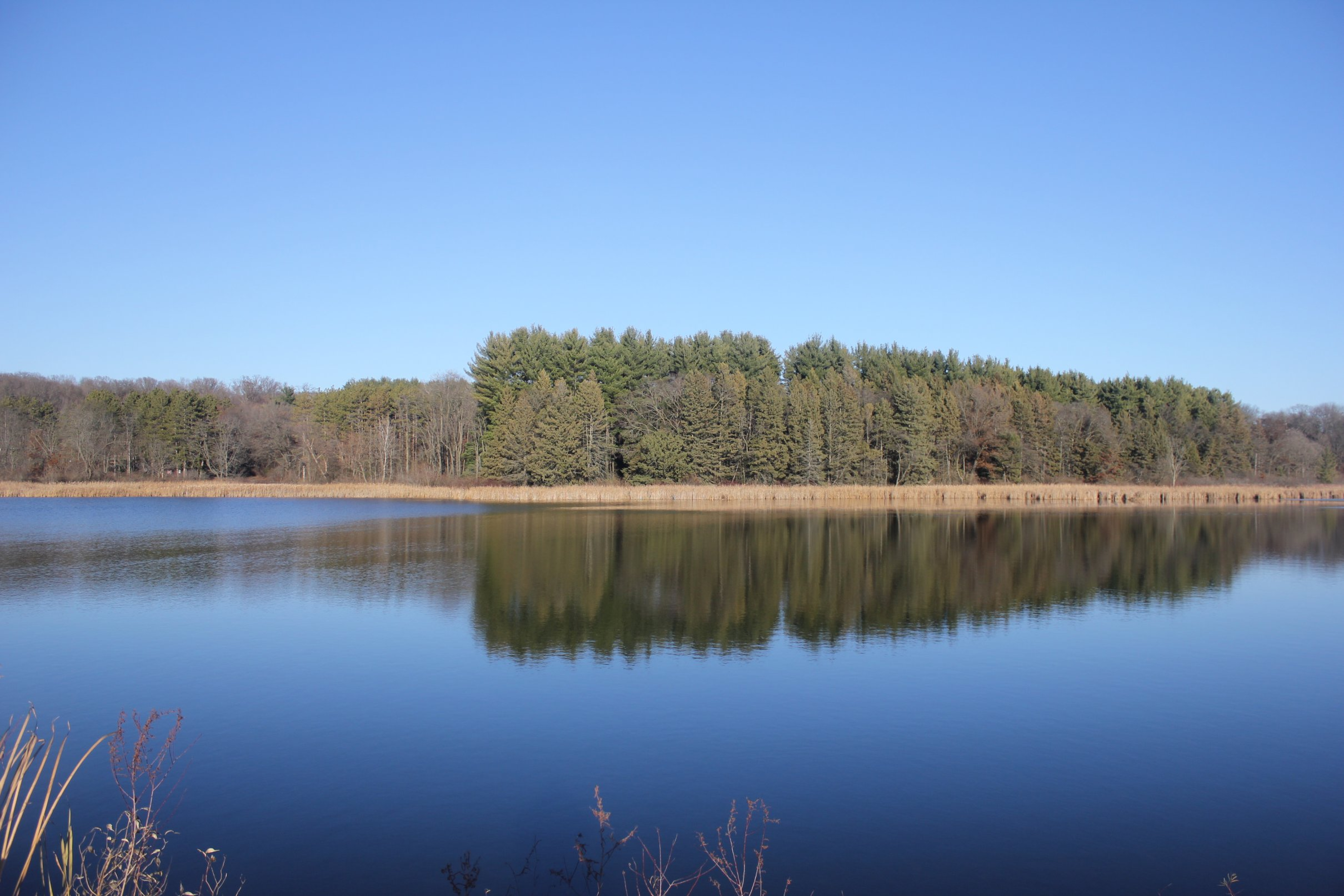
Cadiz Springs State Recreation Area

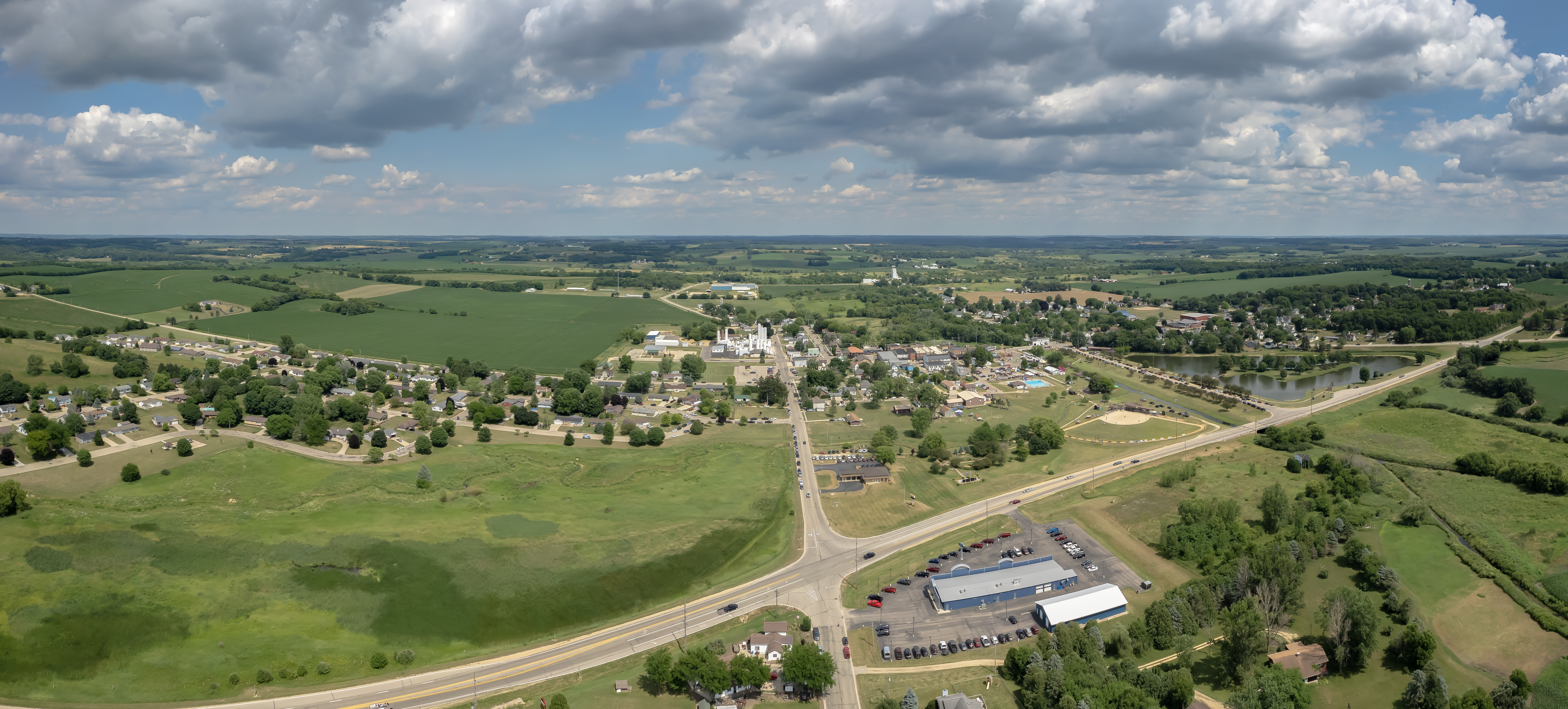
Monticello

== List of past representatives ==
List of representatives to the Wisconsin State Assembly from the 50th district
Member	Party	Residence	Counties represented	Term start	Term end	Ref.
District created
Joanne M. Duren	Dem.	Cazenovia	Dane, Green, Iowa, Lafayette, Richland	January 1, 1973	January 3, 1983	
June Jaronitzky	Rep.	Tripp	Ashland, Bayfield, Iron, Sawyer	January 3, 1983	January 7, 1985	
Dale Schultz	Rep.	Washington	Juneau, Richland, Sauk	January 7, 1985	September 24, 1991	
--Vacant--			Juneau, Richland, Sauk	September 24, 1991	December 26, 1991	
Sheryl Albers	Rep.	Reedsburg	Juneau, Richland, Sauk	December 26, 1991	January 5, 2009	
Sheryl Albers	Rep.	Reedsburg	Juneau, Monroe, Richland, Sauk	December 26, 1991	January 5, 2009	
Edward Brooks	Rep.	Reedsburg	Juneau, Monroe, Richland, Sauk	January 5, 2009	January 7, 2019	
Edward Brooks	Rep.	Reedsburg	Juneau, Monroe, Richland, Sauk, Vernon	January 5, 2009	January 7, 2019	
Tony Kurtz	Rep.	Wonewoc	Juneau, Monroe, Richland, Sauk, Vernon	January 7, 2019	January 6, 2025	
Tony Kurtz	Rep.	Wonewoc	Juneau, Richland, Sauk, Vernon	January 7, 2019	January 6, 2025	
Jenna Jacobson	Dem.	Oregon	Dane, Green	January 6, 2025	Current	
Bill Oemichen	Dem.	New Glarus	Dane, Green	Taking office January 2027		
