= Steve Gunderson =

American non-profit organization executive and former politician

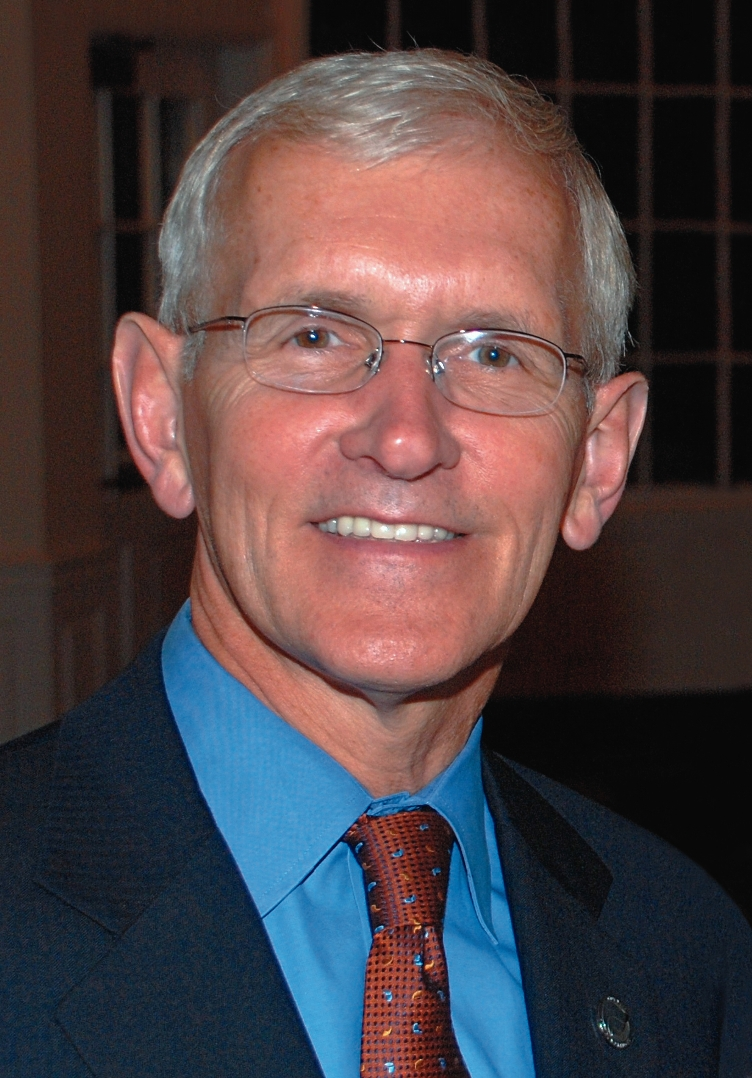
- Gunderson in 2011

House Republican Chief Deputy Whip
- In office January 3, 1989 – January 3, 1993 Serving with Bob Walker
- Leader: Robert H. Michel
- Preceded by: Edward Rell Madigan
- Succeeded by: Bob Walker

Member of the U.S. House of Representatives from Wisconsin's 3rd district
- In office January 3, 1981 – January 3, 1997
- Preceded by: Alvin Baldus
- Succeeded by: Ron Kind

Member of the Wisconsin State Assembly from the 91st district
- In office January 6, 1975 – July 9, 1979
- Preceded by: Eugene Oberle
- Succeeded by: Alan S. Robertson

Personal details
- Born: May 10, 1951 (age 75) Eau Claire, Wisconsin, U.S.
- Party: Republican
- Spouse: Ethan Ngo (m. 2015)
- Education: University of Wisconsin, Madison (BA); Brown College (attended)
- Gunderson's voice Gunderson voicing reservations with the Defense of Marriage Act. Recorded July 12, 1996

Steven Craig Gunderson (born May 10, 1951) is an American former politician who was a Republican U.S. representative for Wisconsin's 3rd congressional district from 1981 to 1997, when he was succeeded by Democrat Ron Kind. After leaving office, he was president and CEO of the Council on Foundations, and then of Career Education Colleges and Universities.

== Early years ==
Gunderson grew up near Whitehall, Wisconsin. After studying at the University of Wisconsin–Madison, he went on to train at the Brown School of Broadcasting in Minneapolis.

== Political career ==
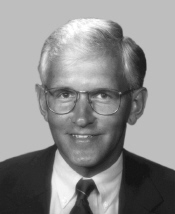
Gunderson while serving in Congress

Gunderson served in the Wisconsin State Assembly from 1975 to 1979 before being elected to the U.S. House of Representatives in 1980, to represent Wisconsin's 3rd congressional district. First elected to the 97th Congress, he served eight terms in the House and did not seek re-election to the 105th Congress in 1996. He was appointed by President Barack Obama to the President's Commission on White House Fellows in January 2010.

Gunderson advocated for expedited immigration rights to the Hmong people, who had been allied with U.S. war efforts during the Vietnam War and later faced persecution under the Communist government of Laos. In an October 1995 National Review article, Michael Johns, a former Republican White House aide and Heritage Foundation policy analyst, praised Gunderson's efforts in behalf of the Hmong people, quoting Gunderson as telling a Hmong gathering in Wisconsin: "I do not enjoy standing up and saying to my government that you are not telling the truth, but if that is necessary to defend truth and justice, I will do that." Republicans also called several congressional hearings on alleged persecution of the Hmong in Laos in an apparent attempt to generate further support for their opposition to the Hmong's repatriation to Laos. Led by Gunderson and other Hmong advocates in Congress, the Clinton administration's policy of forced repatriation of the Hmong was ultimately overturned and thousands were granted U.S. immigration rights.

== Personal life ==
On March 24, 1994, Gunderson was outed as gay on the House floor by representative Bob Dornan (R-CA) during a debate over federal funding for gay-friendly curriculum. Gunderson was the first openly gay Republican representative, and later that year, became the first openly gay Republican to successfully seek re-election. In 1996, Gunderson was the only Republican in Congress to vote against the Defense of Marriage Act, and he has been a vocal supporter of gay rights causes since leaving Congress. During his time in the House, Gunderson was one of only two openly gay Republicans serving in Congress, the other being Jim Kolbe of Arizona.

== Published works ==
- House and Home, E. P. Dutton, 1996, ISBN 978-0-525-94197-2 (with Rob Morris and Bruce Bawer)

== See also ==
- List of LGBT members of the United States Congress

U.S. House of Representatives
Preceded by Alvin Baldus	Member of the U.S. House of Representatives from Wisconsin's 3rd congressional district 1981–1997	Succeeded by Ron Kind
Party political offices
Preceded by Ed Madigan	House Republican Chief Deputy Whip; 1989–1993; Served alongside: Bob Walker	Succeeded by Bob Walker
U.S. order of precedence (ceremonial)
Preceded by Jim Nussle as Former U.S. Representative	Order of precedence of the United States as Former U.S. Representative	Succeeded by Christopher Cox as Former U.S. Representative
