= Jodi Emerson =

American politician (born 1972)

Member of the Wisconsin State Assembly from the 91st district
- Incumbent
- Assumed office January 7, 2019
- Preceded by: Dana Wachs

Personal details
- Born: Jodene K. Deinhammer; August 3, 1972 (age 54) Eau Claire, Wisconsin, U.S.
- Party: Democratic
- Spouse: Julian Emerson (m. 1993)
- Children: 2
- Education: University of Wisconsin–River Falls (attended)
- Website: Official website

Jodene K. "Jodi" Emerson (née Deinhammer; born August 3, 1972) is an American activist and Democratic politician from Eau Claire, Wisconsin. She is a member of the Wisconsin State Assembly, representing the 91st Assembly district since 2019.

== Early life and education ==
Jodi Emerson was born Jodene Deinhammer in Eau Claire, Wisconsin, in August 1972. She was raised and educated and lived nearly her entire life in Eau Claire, graduating from Eau Claire's Memorial High School in 1990. Emerson attended University of Wisconsin–River Falls for two years before starting a family. She has been a PTA president and Girl Scout troop leader.

== Career ==
Emerson has been an adjunct instructor on human trafficking topics at the University of Wisconsin–Eau Claire.

Emerson with Governor Scott Walker at a bill signing in April 2016

Emerson was a legal assistant in a law office and worked as the Director of Public Policy and Community Relations for Fierce Freedom, a nonprofit advocacy organization that worked to address human trafficking. Emerson has been an anti-trafficking advocate and author of a number of successful bipartisan pieces of legislation, including Senate Bill 344, Senate Bill 396, Senate Bill 618, Assembly Bill 16, Assembly Bill 186, Assembly Bill 435, and Act 367.

Emerson also developed a statewide program to train hotel workers to spot the signs of human trafficking and co-chaired the development of the statewide community response protocol on human trafficking. In 2015, Emerson was appointed to serve on Wisconsin's Anti Human Trafficking Task Force. Emerson has also been a member of the Wisconsin Anti-Trafficking Consortium and the Wisconsin Anti-Trafficking Advisory Council, serving as a frequent guest speaker and panelists at churches, schools and libraries across the midwest.

== Wisconsin State Assembly ==
In March 2018, Emerson announced her run for District 91 of the Wisconsin State Assembly. The seat was held by Dana Wachs at the time, but was he was not seeking reelection due to his run for governor. Emerson was endorsed by EMILY's List, Fair Wisconsin, Citizen Action of Wisconsin, State Senator La Tonya Johnson, State Representative Jill Billings, former State Representative Kristen Dexter, and the Wisconsin Chapter of the National Organization for Women.

Emerson currently serves on the following committees in the Wisconsin State Assembly:

- Committee on Aging and Long-Term Care
- Committee on Colleges and Universities
- Committee on Criminal Justice and Public Safety
- Committee on Family Law
- Committee on International Affairs/Commerce

== Personal life and family ==
Jodi Deinhammer took the last name Emerson when she married Julian Emerson in 1993. Julian Emerson is a reporter with the Eau Claire Leader-Telegram. They have two adult daughters.

== Electoral history ==
=== Wisconsin Assembly (2018–present) ===
Year	Election	Date	Elected				Defeated				Total	Plurality
2018	Primary	Aug. 14	Jodi Emerson	Democratic	2,648	37.10%	Thomas Vue	Dem.	1,890	26.48%	7,138	758
2018	Primary	Aug. 14	Jodi Emerson	Democratic	2,648	37.10%	Eric Larsen	Dem.	1,778	24.91%	7,138	758
2018	Primary	Aug. 14	Jodi Emerson	Democratic	2,648	37.10%	Rich Postlewaite	Dem.	814	11.40%	7,138	758
2018	General	Nov. 6	Jodi Emerson	Democratic	17,512	66.47%	Echo Reardon	Rep.	8,798	33.39%	26,347	8,714
2020	General	Nov. 3	Jodi Emerson (inc)	Democratic	18,758	61.86%	Charlie Walker	Rep.	11,530	38.03%	30,322	7,228
2022	General	Nov. 8	Jodi Emerson (inc)	Democratic	16,465	64.61%	Josh Stanley	Rep.	8,995	35.30%	25,484	7,470
2024	General	Nov. 5	Jodi Emerson (inc)	Democratic	17,712	51.52%	Michele Magadance Skinner	Rep.	16,610	48.32%	34,377	1,102

Wisconsin State Assembly
Preceded by Dana Wachs	Member of the Wisconsin State Assembly from the 91st district January 7, 2019 – present	Incumbent
