= Dale Schultz =

American politician (born 1953)

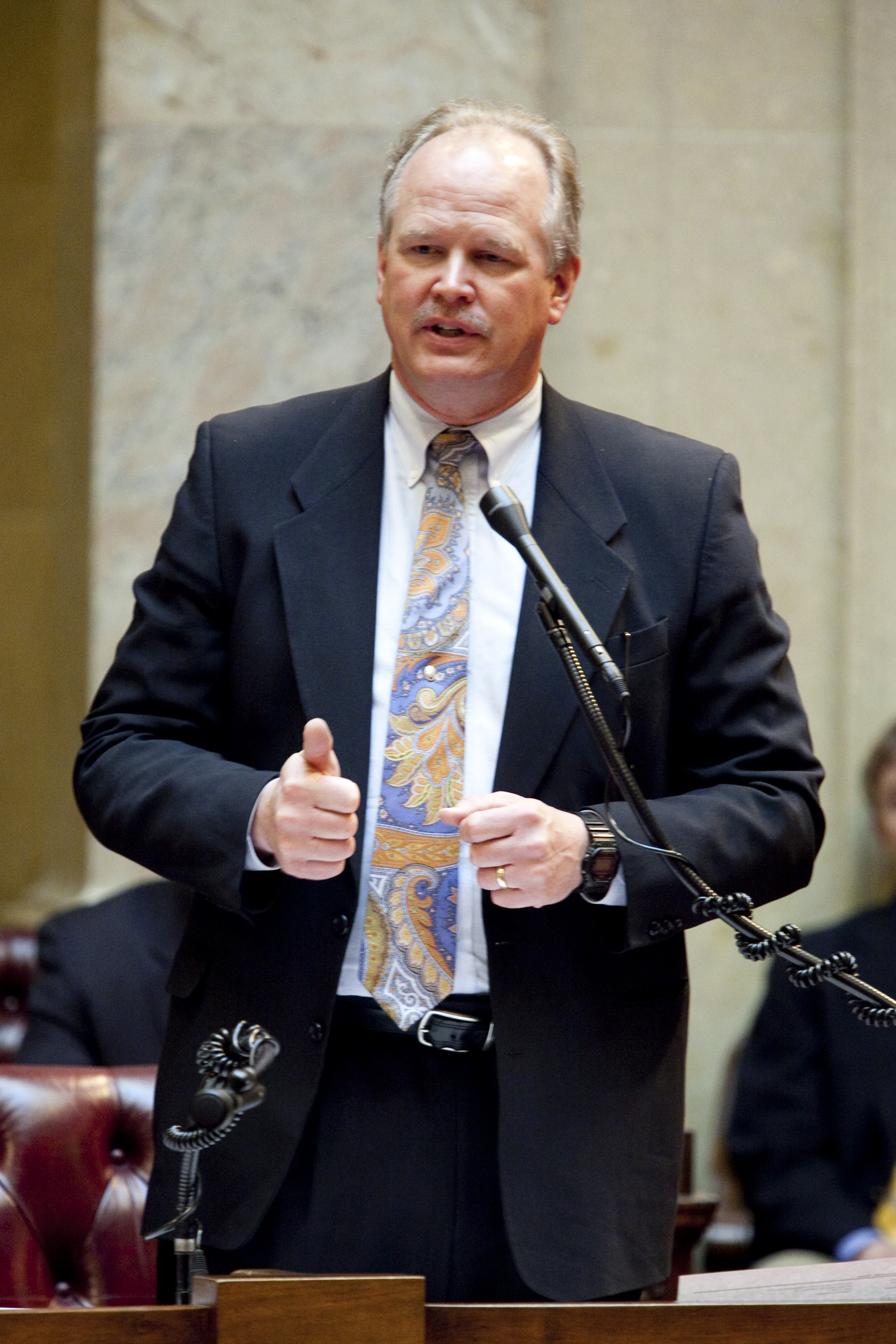

Majority Leader of the Wisconsin Senate
- In office January 3, 2005 – January 1, 2007
- Preceded by: Mary Panzer
- Succeeded by: Judy Robson

Member of the Wisconsin Senate from the 17th district
- In office September 24, 1991 – January 5, 2015
- Preceded by: Richard Kreul
- Succeeded by: Howard Marklein

Member of the Wisconsin State Assembly
- In office January 7, 1985 – September 24, 1991
- Preceded by: June Jaronitzky
- Succeeded by: Sheryl Albers
- Constituency: 50th Assembly district
- In office January 3, 1983 – January 7, 1985
- Preceded by: Alan S. Robertson
- Succeeded by: Barbara Gronemus
- Constituency: 91st Assembly district

Personal details
- Born: June 12, 1953 (age 73) Madison, Wisconsin, U.S.
- Party: Republican
- Spouse: Rachel
- Children: 2
- Education: University of Wisconsin–Madison
- Profession: farm manager, real estate broker
- Website: Official website

Dale W. Schultz (born June 12, 1953) is an American real estate broker and Republican politician from Richland Center, Wisconsin. He was the majority leader of the Wisconsin Senate during the 2005–2006 term, and served over 23 years in the state Senate, representing Wisconsin's 17th Senate district from 1991 to 2015. Before being elected to the Senate, he served nearly 9 years in the Wisconsin State Assembly, from 1983 through 1991.

== Early life and career ==
Schultz was born in Madison, Wisconsin, in 1953. His mother was an attorney and his father owned a pharmacy in the old Washington Hotel. Dale attended Madison Central High School and graduated from Madison West High School.

In 1975, Schultz graduated from the University of Wisconsin–Madison where he played on the Wisconsin Badgers men's basketball team and was a member of the national champion Wisconsin Badgers Crew team.

== Political career ==
=== Wisconsin legislature (1982–2015) ===
Schultz was elected to the Wisconsin State Assembly in 1982 and by special election to the Wisconsin Senate in 1991. Schultz was narrowly elected Senate Majority leader in 2004, but lost that post when Democrats took control of the Wisconsin Senate in 2006.

In addition to his official legislative duties, Senator Schultz served as a member of the Wisconsin Historical Society Board of Curators. Schultz was active with the National Conference of State Legislators (NCSL), the American Legislative Exchange Council (ALEC), and the National Conference of Insurance Legislators (NCOIL).

In 2011, Schultz was the only Senate Republican to vote against the Wisconsin budget repair bill which sparked the 2011 Wisconsin protests. Several Assembly Republicans voted against the bill as well. According to Schultz, he had intended to offer a compromise amendment to the bill, but Walker "decoyed" him, misleading him into leaving the Senate chamber.

In January 2014, Schultz stated that he would not seek reelection, citing an increasingly partisan atmosphere.

=== Post-legislature career ===
After retiring from the senate, Schultz took a position as lecturer in the social science department at the University of Wisconsin-Platteville. Schultz also began a statewide lecture series with former Democratic State Representative Mandy Wright to discuss issues with the state budget and school vouchers. Schultz endorsed Jill Underly in the 2021 election for Superintendent of Public Instruction of Wisconsin.

Just before the 2024 United States presidential election, Schultz was one of a number of Wisconsin Republicans who publicly endorsed Democratic Party nominee Kamala Harris over Republican Donald Trump. Explaining his endorsement, Schultz said, "I myself want to cast my lot with those folks who are [optimistic about] our future, not who are hung up on some sort of Mad Max scene that they see as a future for our country."

== Personal life and family ==
In their spare time, Schultz and his wife Rachel own and manage their family farm, which became a Wisconsin Century Farm in 1998. They have two children, Katie and Amanda. Schultz is a member of the Wisconsin Farm Bureau, the Masons, and the Lions Club. Schultz is a licensed Wisconsin real estate broker and businessman who has interests in other businesses.

Wisconsin State Assembly
Preceded by Alan S. Robertson	Member of the Wisconsin State Assembly from the 91st district January 3, 1983 – January 7, 1985	Succeeded by Barbara Gronemus
Preceded by June Jaronitzky	Member of the Wisconsin State Assembly from the 50th district January 7, 1985 – September 24, 1991	Succeeded by Sheryl Albers
Wisconsin Senate
Preceded by Richard Kreul	Member of the Wisconsin Senate from the 17th district September 24, 1991 – January 5, 2015	Succeeded by Howard Marklein
Preceded by Mary Panzer	Majority Leader of the Wisconsin Senate; January 3, 2005 – January 1, 2007	Succeeded by Judy Robson
