= Wisconsin's 91st Assembly district =

American legislative district in Eau Claire County, Wisconsin

Wisconsin's 91st State Assembly district
- 2024 map defined in 2023 Wisc. Act 94; 2022 map defined in Johnson v. Wisconsin Elections Commission; 2011 map was defined in 2011 Wisc. Act 43
Assemblymember
| Jodi Emerson; D–Eau Claire |
since January 7, 2019 (7 years)
- Demographics: 90.43% White; 1.55% Black; 2.23% Hispanic; 3.34% Asian; 1.59% Native American; 0.17% Hawaiian/Pacific Islander
- Population (2020) • Voting age: 60,072; 46,477
- Website: Official website
- Notes: Northwest Wisconsin

The 91st Assembly district of Wisconsin is one of 99 districts of the Wisconsin State Assembly. Located in western Wisconsin, the district comprises the eastern half of Eau Claire County and part of southeast Chippewa County. It includes the downtown and the east side of the city of Eau Claire, along with the cities of Altoona and Augusta, and the villages of Cadott, Fairchild, and Fall Creek. The district contains landmarks such as Confluence Commercial Historic District, and the historic U.S. Post Office and Courthouse. The district is represented by Democrat Jodi Emerson, since January 2019.

The 91st Assembly district is located within Wisconsin's 31st Senate district, along with the 92nd and 93rd Assembly districts.

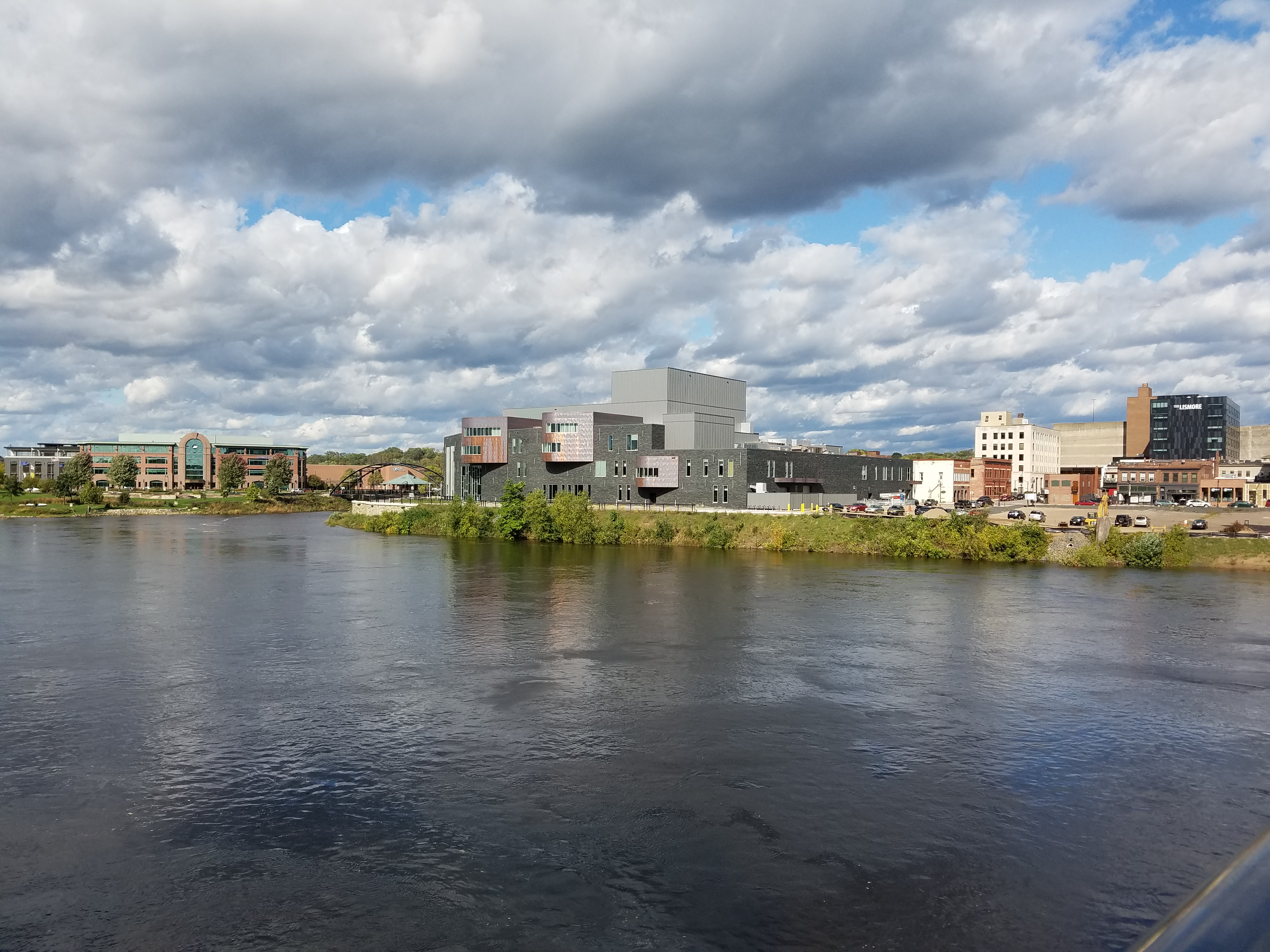
Downtown Eau Claire

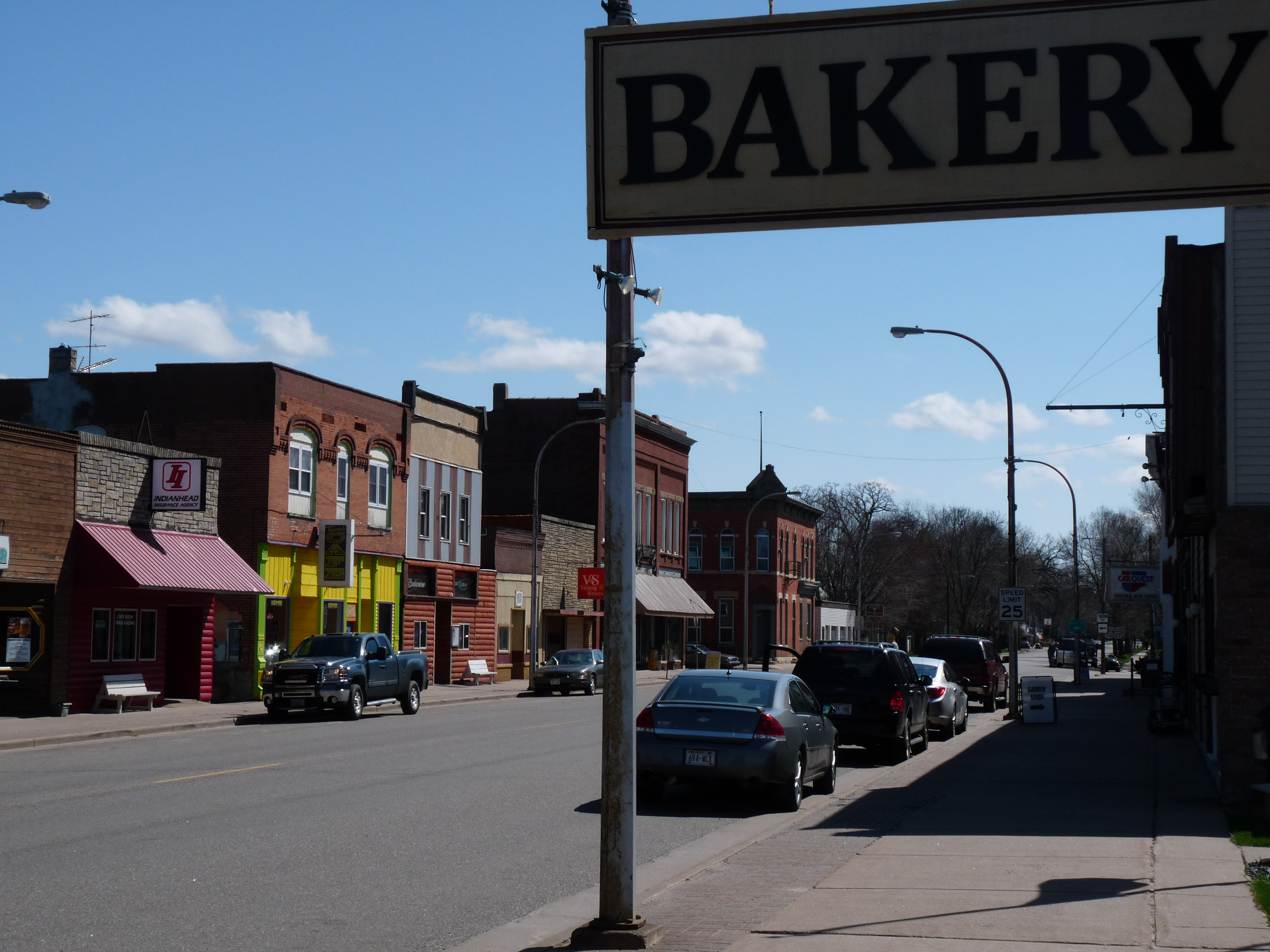
City of Augusta

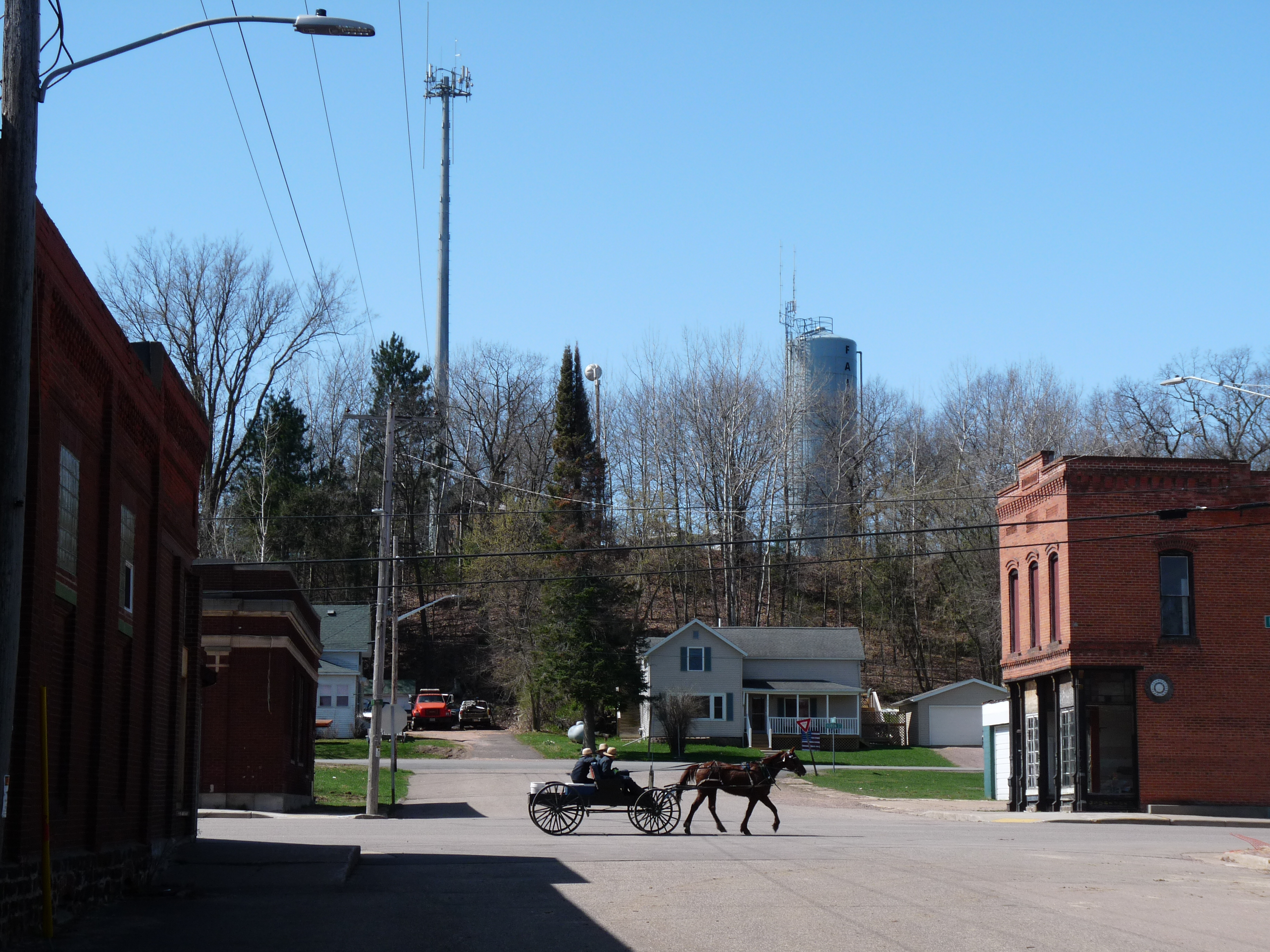
Village of Fairchild

== List of past representatives ==
List of representatives to the Wisconsin State Assembly from the 91st district
| Member | Party | Residence | Counties represented | Term start | Term end | Ref. |
|---|---|---|---|---|---|---|
District created
| Eugene Oberle | Dem. | Stanley | Clark, Eau Claire, Jackson, Trempealeau | January 1, 1973 | January 6, 1975 | |
| Steve Gunderson | Rep. | Osseo | Clark, Eau Claire, Jackson, Trempealeau | January 6, 1975 | July 9, 1979 | |
| --Vacant-- | | | Clark, Eau Claire, Jackson, Trempealeau | July 9, 1979 | September 19, 1979 | |
| Alan S. Robertson | Rep. | Blair | Clark, Eau Claire, Jackson, Trempealeau | September 19, 1979 | January 3, 1983 | |
| Dale Schultz | Rep. | Washington | Richland, Sauk | January 3, 1983 | January 7, 1985 | |
| Barbara Gronemus | Dem. | Whitehall | Buffalo, Pepin, Tremealeau | January 7, 1985 | January 5, 2009 | |
| Barbara Gronemus | Dem. | Whitehall | Buffalo, Jackson, Pepin, Tremealeau | January 7, 1985 | January 5, 2009 | |
| Barbara Gronemus | Dem. | Whitehall | Buffalo, Pepin, Pierce, Tremealeau | January 7, 1985 | January 5, 2009 | |
| Chris Danou | Dem. | Trempealeau | Buffalo, Pepin, Pierce, Tremealeau | January 5, 2009 | January 7, 2013 | |
| Dana Wachs | Dem. | Eau Claire | Eau Claire | January 7, 2013 | January 7, 2019 | |
| Jodi Emerson | Dem. | Eau Claire | Eau Claire | January 7, 2019 | Current | |
