= Sheryl Albers =

American politician (1954–2022)

Member of the Wisconsin State Assembly from the 50th district
- In office December 26, 1991 – January 5, 2009
- Preceded by: Dale Schultz
- Succeeded by: Edward Brooks

Personal details
- Born: September 9, 1954 Baraboo, Wisconsin, U.S.
- Died: May 25, 2022 (aged 67) Cottage Grove, Wisconsin, U.S.

Sheryl Albers (September 9, 1954 – May 25, 2022) was an American politician.

== Education ==
Sheryl Albers graduated from Baraboo High School in Baraboo, Wisconsin. She attended Carroll University from 1972 to 1974; she graduated from Ripon College with a BA in 1976. She later attended law school at the University of Wisconsin — Madison, beginning in 1999 and graduating in 2004.

== Farming ==
Albers was raised on a family farm that raised mint and soybeans; she worked as a mint / muck farmer from 1972 until 1978. She was a dairy farmer from 1978 to 1996. Albers also worked in potato agriculture and in retail sales of farm products in these years.

Albers served on the Sauk County board of the American Farm Bureau Federation and was named Sauk County's Miss Farm Bureau at one point. While working in agriculture, she obtained a Pilot license and owned a Teratorn ultra lite aircraft. Albers and her first husband Jim Albers were named as "Outstanding Young Farmers" for Sauk County. Albers was a founding member of the Sauk County Women in Agriculture (Eagle Bluff Chapter), and was a member of the Wisconsin Mint Growers Association, the Wisconsin Muck Growers Association, and the Wisconsin Drainage Boards Association.

During her public-sector career, she would become recognized for her knowledge of (and connections within) the agriculture community in Wisconsin. She also frequently dealt with issues related to agriculture including land use, zoning, property rights, property taxation, and rural economic development.

== Politics ==
Volunteer roles and work as a staff person

Albers served from 1976 until 1978, as Publicity Chair for the Sauk County (Wisconsin) Republican Party. She became the county party's vice-chair in 1978- 1980 and its chair from 1980 to 1982. She also served as the Sauk County coordinator for the Ronald Reagan 1980 presidential campaign. Albers joined the staff of the Wisconsin State Assembly in 1987. She became known as a productive and knowledgeable analyst on issues of agriculture and land use.

Elected office

In 1991, a midterm vacancy arose in the Assembly when then-State-Representative Dale Schultz won a special election to the Wisconsin State Senate; Albers ran for Schultz's seat and won. She would serve in the Assembly for the rest of the 1991 session and all of the next nine sessions. In 2008, she did not seek re-election.

== After office ==
Albers later worked for the District Attorney's Office in Juneau County, Wisconsin, the Office of Lawyer Regulation in the Wisconsin Supreme Court, and as a records officer and human resources officer in the Wisconsin Department of Corrections. From 2013 until early 2015 Albers returned to legislative staff work, serving as committee clerk in the office of State Senator Dale Schultz. Albers also worked in other positions as a private attorney and as a manager in a local business in Monona, Wisconsin.

== Family ==
Albers was the daughter of Marcus Gumz, a frequent candidate for public office in Wisconsin and a longtime activist on issues affecting agriculture, land use, and the role of government. Albers credited her father with inspiring her own career in public service and advocacy.

== Death ==
Albers died May 25, 2022, from the effects of cancer. She wrote her own obituary.
