= Browntown, Wisconsin =

- Village
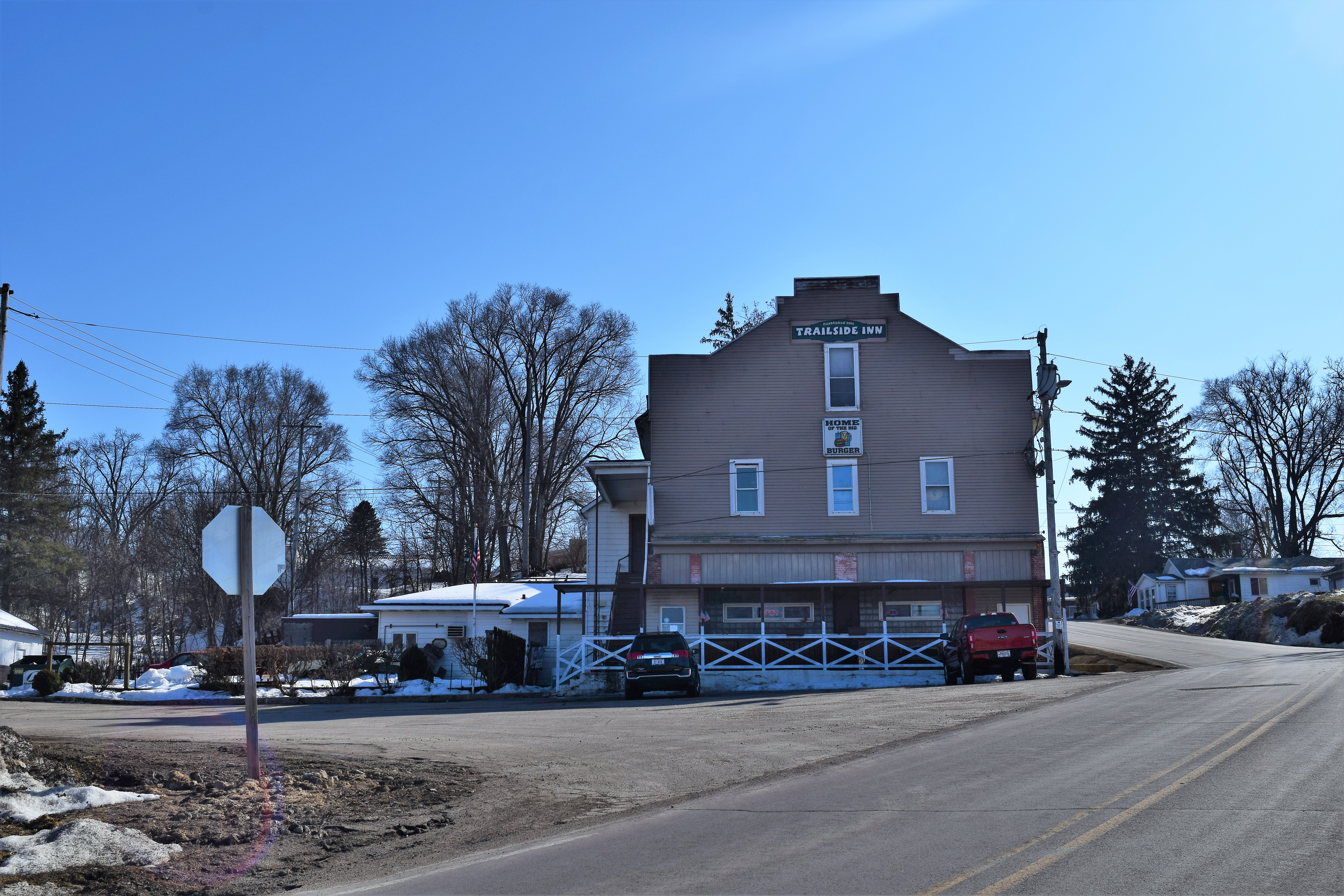
- The Trailside Inn in Browntown

- Location of Browntown in Green County, Wisconsin.
- Coordinates: 42°34′38″N 89°47′35″W
- Country: United States
- State: Wisconsin
- County: Green

Area
  - Total: 1.05 sq mi (2.73 km^{2})
  - Land: 1.05 sq mi (2.73 km^{2})
  - Water: 0 sq mi (0.00 km^{2})
- Elevation: 837 ft (255 m)

Population (2020)
  - Total: 245
  - Density: 232/sq mi (89.7/km^{2})
- Time zone: UTC-6 (Central (CST))
  - Summer (DST): UTC-5 (CDT)
- Area code: 608
- FIPS code: 55-10475
- GNIS feature ID: 1562278
- Website: https://villageofbrowntown.com/

Browntown is a village in Green County, Wisconsin, United States. The population was 245 at the 2020 census.

== Geography ==
Browntown is located at 42°34′38″N 89°47′35″W (42.577268, -89.793134).

According to the United States Census Bureau, the village has a total area of 1.06 square miles (2.75 km^{2}), all land.

== Demographics ==
Historical population
| Census | Pop. | Note | %± |
|---|---|---|---|
| 1900 | 246 | | — |
| 1910 | 222 | | −9.8% |
| 1920 | 245 | | 10.4% |
| 1930 | 291 | | 18.8% |
| 1940 | 271 | | −6.9% |
| 1950 | 279 | | 3.0% |
| 1960 | 263 | | −5.7% |
| 1970 | 253 | | −3.8% |
| 1980 | 284 | | 12.3% |
| 1990 | 256 | | −9.9% |
| 2000 | 252 | | −1.6% |
| 2010 | 280 | | 11.1% |
| 2020 | 245 | | −12.5% |
U.S. Decennial Census

=== 2010 census ===
As of the census of 2010, there were 280 people, 109 households, and 83 families living in the village. The population density was 264.2 inhabitants per square mile (102.0/km^{2}). There were 116 housing units at an average density of 109.4 per square mile (42.2/km^{2}). The racial makeup of the village was 95.7% White, 0.7% African American, 0.4% Native American, 1.1% from other races, and 2.1% from two or more races. Hispanic or Latino of any race were 1.8% of the population.

There were 109 households, of which 37.6% had children under the age of 18 living with them, 57.8% were married couples living together, 11.0% had a female householder with no husband present, 7.3% had a male householder with no wife present, and 23.9% were non-families. 22.0% of all households were made up of individuals, and 4.6% had someone living alone who was 65 years of age or older. The average household size was 2.57 and the average family size was 2.94.

The median age in the village was 36.4 years. 27.1% of residents were under the age of 18; 7.5% were between the ages of 18 and 24; 23.6% were from 25 to 44; 30% were from 45 to 64; and 11.8% were 65 years of age or older. The gender makeup of the village was 49.6% male and 50.4% female.

=== 2000 census ===
As of the census of 2000, there were 252 people, 100 households, and 77 families living in the village. The population density was 238.9 people per square mile (92.7/km^{2}). There were 104 housing units at an average density of 98.6 per square mile (38.2/km^{2}). The racial makeup of the village was 100.00% White. Hispanic or Latino of any race were 2.38% of the population.

There were 100 households, out of which 32.0% had children under the age of 18 living with them, 63.0% were married couples living together, 9.0% had a female householder with no husband present, and 23.0% were non-families. 18.0% of all households were made up of individuals, and 7.0% had someone living alone who was 65 years of age or older. The average household size was 2.52 and the average family size was 2.82.

In the village, the population was spread out, with 25.0% under the age of 18, 3.6% from 18 to 24, 26.6% from 25 to 44, 27.0% from 45 to 64, and 17.9% who were 65 years of age or older. The median age was 41 years. For every 100 females, there were 96.9 males. For every 100 females age 18 and over, there were 92.9 males.

The median income for a household in the village was $36,500, and the median income for a family was $41,563. Males had a median income of $27,083 versus $21,667 for females. The per capita income for the village was $14,876. About 4.9% of families and 5.6% of the population were below the poverty line, including 8.1% of those under the age of eighteen and 8.3% of those 65 or over.

== Recreation ==
The community is located near Browntown-Cadiz Springs State Recreation Area. The Cheese Country Trail passes through the northern edge of the village.
