= Chris Danou =

American politician (born 1967)

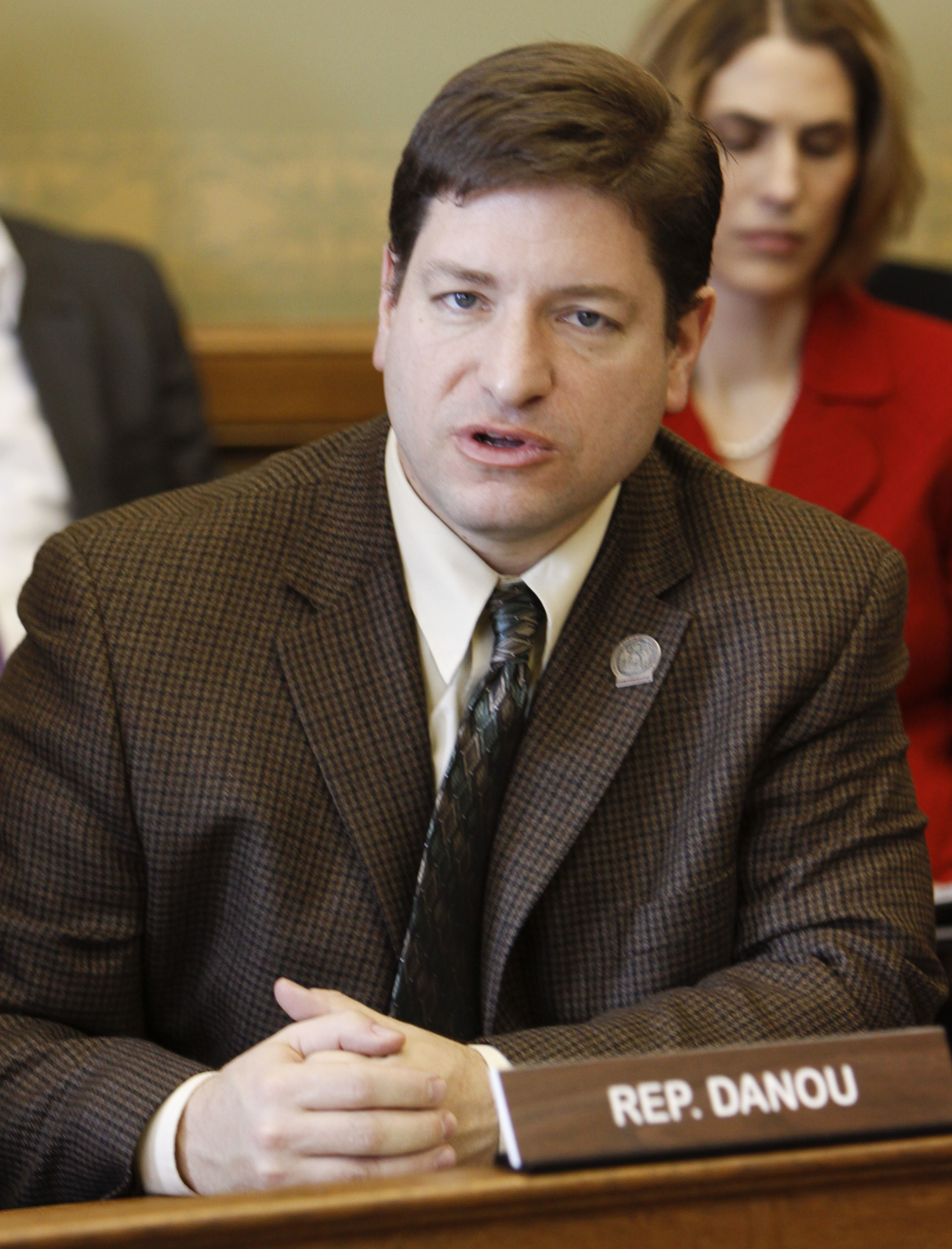
- Danou in 2009

Member of the Wisconsin State Assembly
- In office January 7, 2013 – January 2, 2017
- Preceded by: Mark Radcliffe
- Succeeded by: Treig Pronschinske
- Constituency: 92nd district
- In office January 5, 2009 – January 7, 2013
- Preceded by: Barbara Gronemus
- Succeeded by: Dana Wachs
- Constituency: 91st district

Personal details
- Born: January 18, 1967 (age 59) Bloomington, Illinois, U.S.
- Party: Democratic
- Spouse: Kathryn Meredith
- Children: 2
- Education: University of Wisconsin–Stevens Point at Marshfield (A.A.); University of Wisconsin–Madison (B.A.); American University (M.A.); University of Wisconsin–Stevens Point (M.S.)
- Occupation: Police officer, conservationist

Christopher Hitchings Danou (born January 18, 1967) is an American conservationist, Democratic politician, and former law enforcement officer from Trempealeau County, Wisconsin. He served four terms in the Wisconsin State Assembly, from 2009 through 2017; during his first two terms his constituency was the 91st Assembly district, and after the 2011 redistricting, he represented the 92nd district. After leaving office, he worked as government relations director for Gathering Waters, a conservation nonprofit that advocates for Wisconsin's land trusts. Danou is a candidate for Assembly again in 2026, running in what is now the 29th Assembly district.

== Early life and career ==
Chris Danou was born in Bloomington, Illinois, in January 1967. As a child, he moved with his parents to Marshfield, Wisconsin, where he was raised and educated; he graduated from Marshfield's Columbus High School in 1985. After high school, he first attended the University of Wisconsin–Stevens Point at Marshfield, where he earned his associate's degree in 1987; he immediately went on to the University of Wisconsin–Madison, where he earned his bachelor's degree in history in 1989. He continued his education at American University, in Washington, D.C., and obtained his master's in international relations in 1991. For his master's work at American University, he performed a research internship with the Friends of the Earth. He immediately entered another graduate program, for wildlife management, at the University of Wisconsin–Stevens Point, ultimately earning another master's degree in 1997.

After completing his education, Danou worked as a conservation warden for the Wisconsin Department of Natural Resources, and was then employed as a police officer in Onalaska, Wisconsin; he was a member of the County Emergency Response Team (SWAT Unit) and the Metropolitan Enforcement Group, and served as a school liaison officer. He was active in the local police union—the Onalaska Professional Police Association—and became president of the union.

== Political career ==
Danou made his first bid for public office in 2006, seeking the Democratic Party nomination for Wisconsin Senate in the 31st Senate district, attempting to challenge incumbent Republican state senator Ron Brown. Danou made healthcare a central issue of his campaign, saying that the legislature should enact a plan to provide guaranteed medical coverage for all children and 98 percent of adults, or state legislators should be required to surrender their state insurance plan. He faced a competitive Democratic primary against prominent farmer and agricultural advocate Kathleen Vinehout, however. Vinehout prevailed in the September primary, receiving 64% of the vote.

Two years later, Danou made another run for political office, this time running for Wisconsin State Assembly in the 91st Assembly district seat being vacated by the retirement of Barbara Gronemus. Danou faced another competitive Democratic primary, this time with a crowded field of five opponents, including Arcadia mayor John Kimmel and Pepin County supervisor James K. Kraft. Danou prevailed in the primary with 34% of the vote, and went on to defeat Republican Dave Hegenbarth in the general election. He served two terms representing the 91st Assembly district before the 2011 redistricting act, which shifted Danou's Trempealeau County from the 91st district to the 92nd Assembly district. Under the new district, Danou won two more terms. He ran for a fifth term in 2016, but was narrowly defeated, falling 1,065 votes short of Republican Treig Pronschinske of Mondovi.

After leaving office, Danou went to work for Gathering Waters, a nonprofit that advocates for resources and education for Wisconsin's land trusts.

Danou was largely removed from politics for the next decade, but occasionally endorsed former Assembly colleagues such as Tom Nelson, JoCasta Zamarripa, and Kelda Roys.

In 2026, Danou returned to electoral politics, running again for Wisconsin State Assembly. Since his last election, Wisconsin had undergone another significant redistricting, and his home of Trempealeau was now located in the new 29th Assembly district, in a district configuration similar to the pre-2011 91st district—comprising Buffalo, Pepin, and southern Pierce County, along with most of Trempealeau County. In the 2026 general election, Danou faces a rematch with his 2016 opponent, Treig Pronschinske.

== Electoral history ==
=== Wisconsin Senate, 31st district (2006) ===
Year	Election	Date	Elected				Defeated				Total	Plurality
2006	Primary	Sep. 12	Kathleen Vinehout	Democratic	9,235	64.21%	Chris Danou	Dem.	5,143	35.76%	14,382	4,092

=== Wisconsin Assembly, 91st district (2008, 2010) ===
Year	Election	Date	Elected				Defeated				Total	Plurality
2008	Primary	Sep. 9	Chris Danou	Democratic	1,655	34.74%	Marge Baecker	Dem.	1,202	25.23%	4,764	453
2008	Primary	Sep. 9	Chris Danou	Democratic	1,655	34.74%	John Kimmel	Dem.	579	12.15%	4,764	453
2008	Primary	Sep. 9	Chris Danou	Democratic	1,655	34.74%	Steve Boe	Dem.	551	11.06%	4,764	453
2008	Primary	Sep. 9	Chris Danou	Democratic	1,655	34.74%	James K. Kraft	Dem.	527	11.06%	4,764	453
2008	Primary	Sep. 9	Chris Danou	Democratic	1,655	34.74%	Remy Ceci	Dem.	249	5.23%	4,764	453
2008	General	Nov. 4	Chris Danou	Democratic	14,377	53.34%	Dave Hegenbarth	Rep.	11,583	42.97%	26,953	2,794
2008	General	Nov. 4	Chris Danou	Democratic	14,377	53.34%	Paul A. Beseler	Ind.	712	2.64%	26,953	2,794
2008	General	Nov. 4	Chris Danou	Democratic	14,377	53.34%	Ted Burleson	Lib.	256	0.95%	26,953	2,794
2010	General	Nov. 2	Chris Danou (inc)	Democratic	11,375	58.70%	Bill Ingram	Rep.	8,000	41.28%	19,378	3,375

=== Wisconsin Assembly, 92nd district (2012–2016) ===
Year	Election	Date	Elected				Defeated				Total	Plurality
2012	General	Nov. 6	Chris Danou	Democratic	20,308	98.76%	Stephen J. Doerr	Rep.	50	0.24%	20,562	
2014	General	Nov. 4	Chris Danou (inc)	Democratic	11,862	56.58%	Isaac Weix	Rep.	9,096	43.38%	20,966	2,766
2016	General	Nov. 8	Treig Pronschinske	Republican	13,605	51.99%	Chris Danou (inc)	Dem.	12,540	47.92%	26,167	1,065

=== Wisconsin Assembly, 29th district (2026) ===
Wisconsin State Assembly
Preceded by Barbara Gronemus	Member of the Wisconsin State Assembly from the 91st district January 5, 2009 – January 7, 2013	Succeeded by Dana Wachs
Preceded by Mark Radcliffe	Member of the Wisconsin State Assembly from the 92nd district January 7, 2013 – January 2, 2017	Succeeded by Treig Pronschinske
