= Preston, Trempealeau County, Wisconsin =

Preston, Wisconsin
- Town
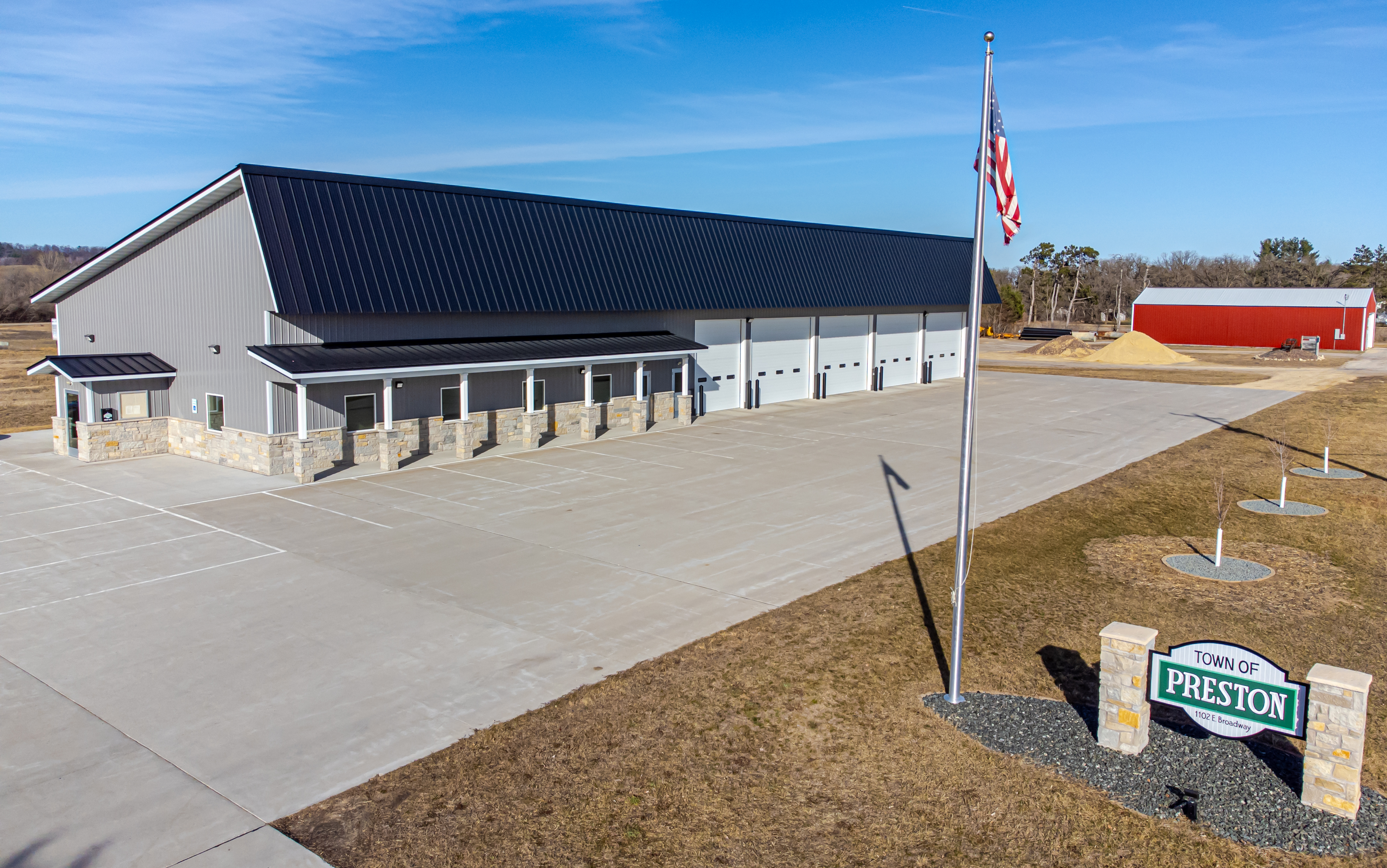
- Town hall

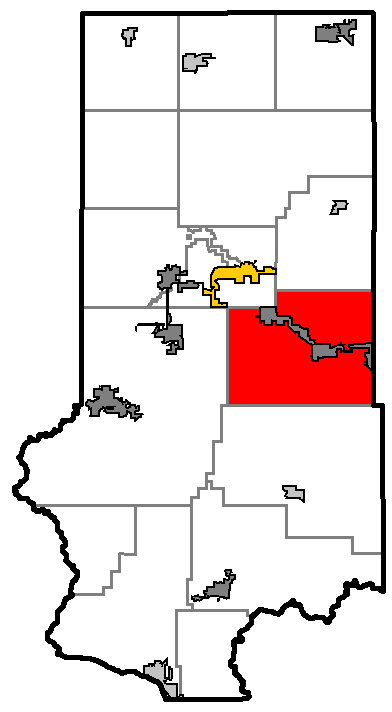
- Location of Preston, Trempealeau County, Wisconsin

- Location of Trempealeau County, Wisconsin
- Coordinates: 44°18′10″N 91°15′10″W
- Country: United States
- State: Wisconsin
- County: Trempealeau

Area
  - Total: 59.2 sq mi (153.2 km^{2})
  - Land: 59.2 sq mi (153.2 km^{2})
  - Water: 0 sq mi (0.0 km^{2})
- Elevation: 840 ft (256 m)

Population (2020)
  - Total: 942
  - Density: 15.9/sq mi (6.15/km^{2})
- Time zone: UTC-6 (Central (CST))
  - Summer (DST): UTC-5 (CDT)
- FIPS code: 55-65500
- GNIS feature ID: 1583983
- Website: https://www.townofprestontremplo.com/

Preston is a town in Trempealeau County, Wisconsin, United States. The population was 942 at the 2020 census.

== Geography ==
According to the United States Census Bureau, the town has a total area of 59.2 square miles (153.2 km^{2}), of which 59.2 square miles (153.2 km^{2}) is land and 0.02% is water.

== Demographics ==
As of the census of 2000, there were 951 people, 333 households, and 263 families residing in the town. The population density was 16.1 people per square mile (6.2/km^{2}). There were 372 housing units at an average density of 6.3 per square mile (2.4/km^{2}). The racial makeup of the town was 98.42% White, 0.11% African American, 0.32% Native American, 0.21% Asian, 0.21% from other races, and 0.74% from two or more races. Hispanic or Latino of any race were 0.42% of the population.

There were 333 households, out of which 35.1% had children under the age of 18 living with them, 68.5% were married couples living together, 5.1% had a female householder with no husband present, and 21.0% were non-families. 17.4% of all households were made up of individuals, and 9.9% had someone living alone who was 65 years of age or older. The average household size was 2.86 and the average family size was 3.24.

In the town, the population was 30.3% under the age of 18, 7.3% from 18 to 24, 26.7% from 25 to 44, 24.2% from 45 to 64, and 11.6% who were 65 years of age or older. The median age was 36 years. For every 100 females, there were 107.6 males. For every 100 females age 18 and over, there were 105.3 males.

The median income for a household in the town was $40,000, and the median income for a family was $43,523. Males had a median income of $27,313 versus $20,469 for females. The per capita income for the town was $16,391. About 6.3% of families and 11.3% of the population were below the poverty line, including 16.4% of those under age 18 and 8.1% of those age 65 or over.
