= Barbara Gronemus =

American politician (1931–2021)

Member of the Wisconsin State Assembly
- In office January 7, 1985 – January 5, 2009
- Preceded by: Dale Schultz
- Succeeded by: Chris Danou
- Constituency: 91st Assembly district
- In office January 3, 1983 – January 7, 1985
- Preceded by: Cloyd A. Porter
- Succeeded by: Charles W. Coleman
- Constituency: 43rd Assembly district

Personal details
- Born: November 21, 1931 Norwalk, Wisconsin, U.S.
- Died: January 17, 2021 (aged 89) Blair, Wisconsin, U.S.
- Resting place: Lincoln Cemetery, Whitehall, Wisconsin
- Party: Democratic
- Spouse: Lambert N. Gronemus (m. 1949; died 2005)
- Occupation: Farmer

Barbara "Bobby" Gronemus (née Barry; November 21, 1931 – January 17, 2021) was an American farmer and Democratic politician from Trempealeau County, Wisconsin. She served 26 years in the Wisconsin State Assembly, from 1983 to 2009.

== Biography ==
Barbara Gronemus was born Barbara Barry in Norwalk, Wisconsin. She graduated from Ontario Public High School. She was a farmer/farm wife and was a nursing home activity director. Gronemus lived in Whitehall, Wisconsin, with her husband and family. She served as a Democratic Party member of the Wisconsin State Assembly, representing the 91st Assembly District from 1982 through 2008. She died at Grandvie Care Center in Blair, Wisconsin.

== Notes ==
Wisconsin State Assembly
Preceded by Cloyd A. Porter	Member of the Wisconsin State Assembly from the 43rd district January 3, 1983 – January 7, 1985	Succeeded by Charles W. Coleman
Preceded by Dale Schultz	Member of the Wisconsin State Assembly from the 91st district January 7, 1985 – January 5, 2009	Succeeded by Chris Danou
