= Cadiz Springs State Recreation Area =

State park in Green County, Wisconsin

- IUCN category V (protected landscape/seascape)
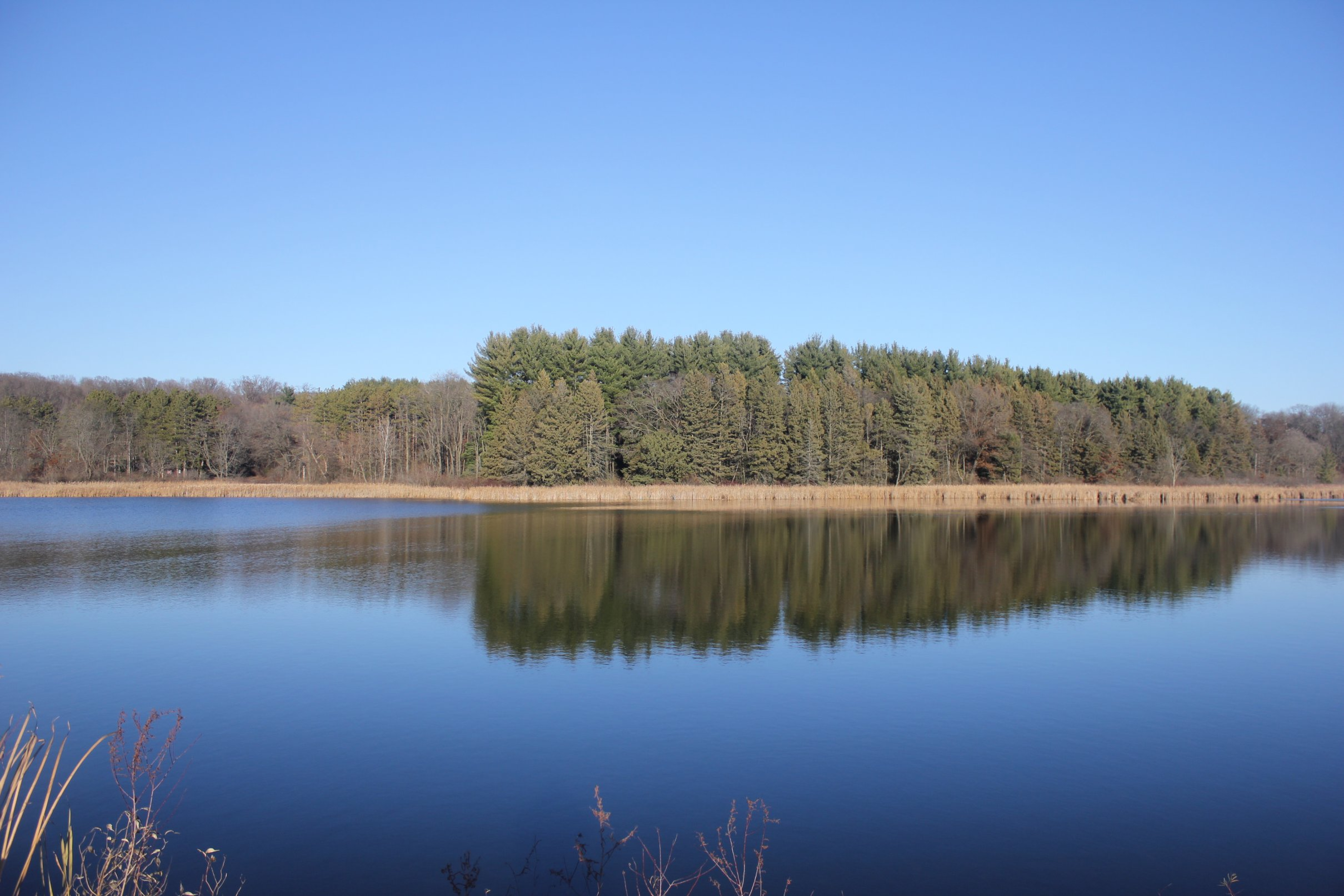
- Lake Zander at Cadiz Springs

- Location within Wisconsin Location within the United States
- Location: Green, Wisconsin, United States
- Coordinates: 42°35′3″N 89°46′19″W
- Area: 644 acres (261 ha)
- Established: 1980
- Governing body: Wisconsin Department of Natural Resources

Cadiz Springs State Recreation Area is a state park unit of Wisconsin, United States, featuring two reservoirs on a spring-fed creek. The creek was dammed to provide water recreation opportunities in the Driftless Area, a region with few natural lakes. The total surface area of Beckman and Zander Lakes is 95 acres (38 ha). The current park was created in 1980 when Cadiz Springs State Park was combined with the Browntown Wildlife Area.
